= Field Guide to Memory =

One-player role-playing game

- Designers: Shing Yin Khor, Jeeyon Shim
- Publication: 2021
- Genres: Keepsake game; Solo tabletop role-playing game; Storytelling game
- Players: 1
- Playing time: Daily prompts for 20 days
- Skills: Writing, storytelling
- Website: Official Itch.io listing

Field Guide to Memory is a one-player, narrative, pen-and-paper journaling, indie role-playing game by Shing Yin Khor and Jeeyon Shim, in which the mentee of Dr. Elizabeth Lee, a cryptozoologist missing and recently declared legally dead, attempts to piece together her research and legacy through correspondence and fieldwork.

Following a successful Kickstarter crowdfunding campaign in December 2020, the first iteration of the game was emailed to backers as daily game prompts over the course of four weeks in February 2021. Subsequently, Field Guide to Memory was reformatted and released as a PDF of daily prompts. The game won "live action" at the 2021 IndieCade Awards.

== Gameplay ==
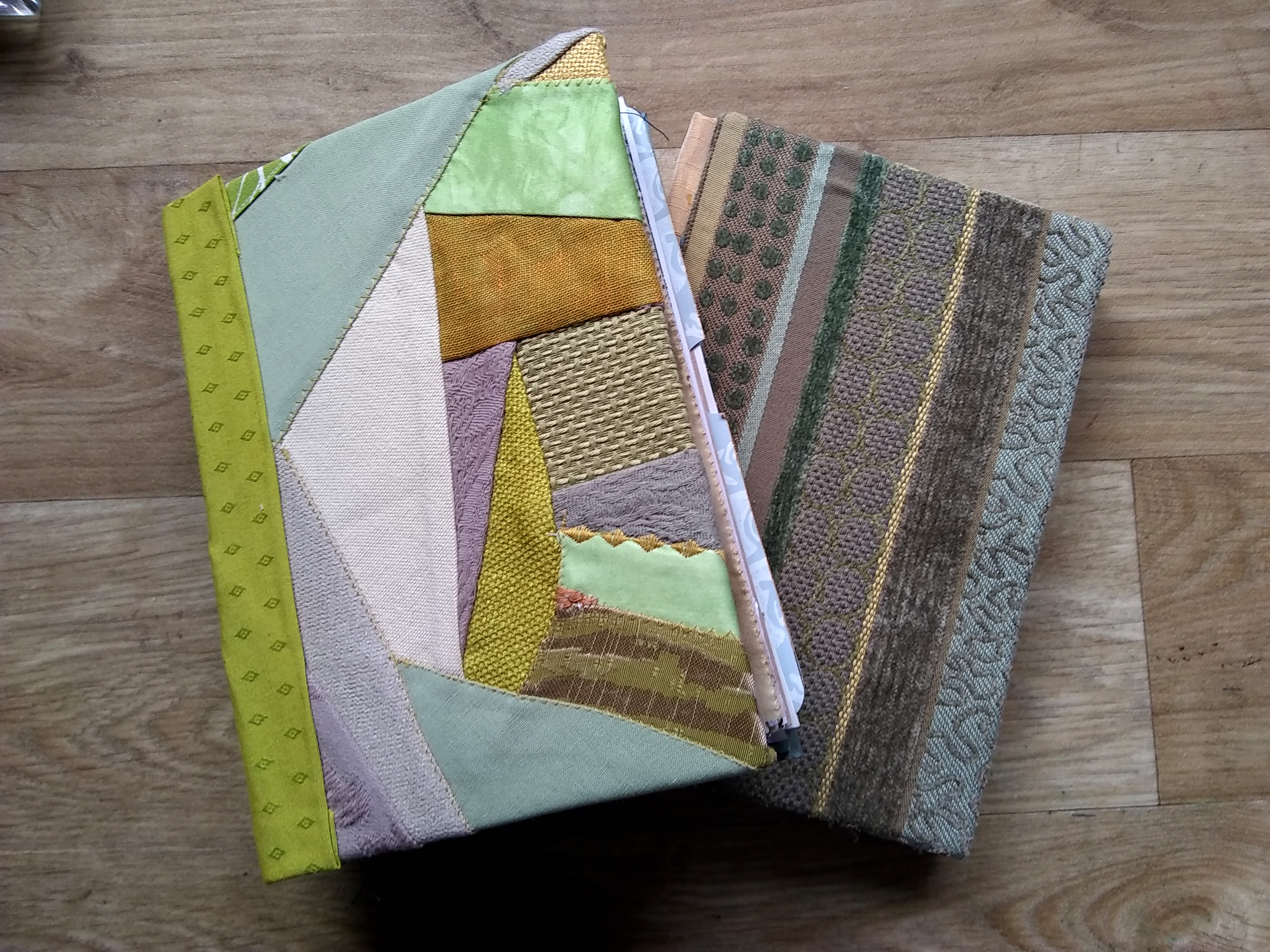
Players are required to supply their own journal to play the game.

Field Guide to Memory is a keepsake game where players create a physical artifact as part of the game mechanics. The player follows daily prompts that ask them to write, create art, and do other physical activities in the real world, often involving nature.

These prompts include scanned ephemera, such as research reports and letters, for the player to respond to; directions to recall the player character's memories of their relationship with Dr. Lee; and physical items that the player is instructed to find and interact with, such as a leaf or a cocktail napkin. Players will collect their responses in a journal. The game divides text responses into three categories: diary, fieldnotes, and correspondence. The player determines how to organize their responses.

== Narrative ==
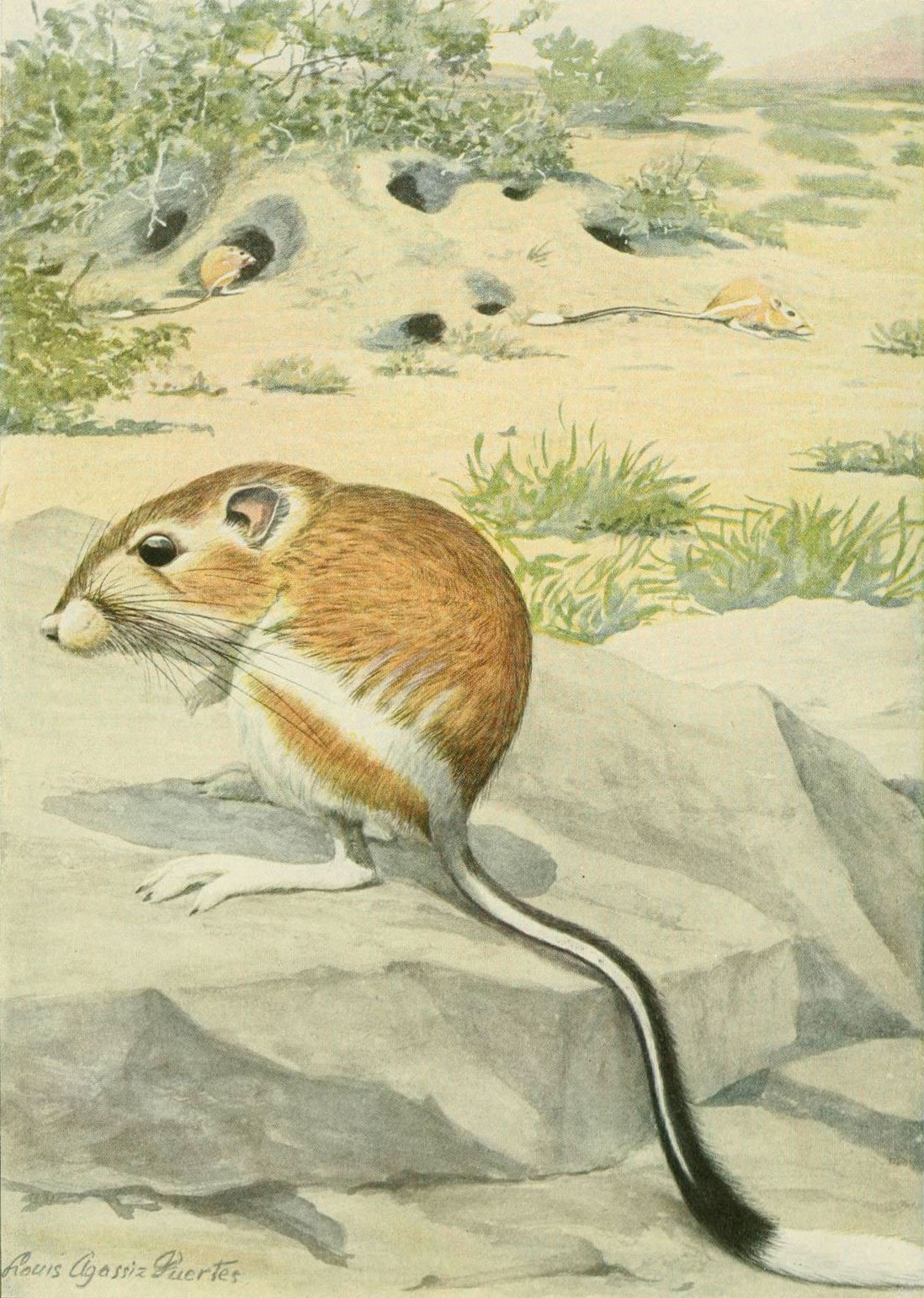
A 1918 illustration of the banner-tailed kangaroo rat by Louis Agassiz Fuertes, which is part of the real genus Dipodomys

The player character is the mentee of Dr. Elizabeth Lee, a cryptozoologist who disappeared during a field expedition five years before the events of the game and has recently been declared legally dead. Lee's research focused on the cryptid Dipodomys antilocapra, also known as the pronghorned desert rat. While working at the Institute of Theoretical Evolution, she also participated in educational outreach programs, including the Little Citizen Scientists' Club. The player character first met her as a child through this club and continued to be mentored by Lee on their own academic path.

At the beginning of the game, the player character is mired in bureaucracy while attempting to recover Lee's research from the Institute. Over the course of the game, they connect with people whose lives were influenced by Lee's research and educational work, organize a campaign to collect portions of her research that are not held by the Institute, and participate in a field expedition dedicated to Lee's research. Throughout these events, the character reflects on Lee's impact on their own life and on the lives of others.

== Publication history ==
In December 2020, Shing Yin Khor and Jeeyon Shim launched a Kickstarter to fund the creation of the game. The crowdfunding campaign surpassed the goal of $18,000 and raised just over $62,000 with the support of 1,817 backers. Initially, the game was run as a live game in February 2021 for Kickstarter backers who received the game prompts via email over the course of four weeks. The game was then repackaged as a PDF of daily prompts available for purchase on Itch.io.

Khor and Shim are credited for coining the term keepsake game. Alexis Ong of The Verge noted that they defined it "as both a genre and a useful shorthand for their work". Sharang Biswas, for the Broken Pencil, wrote that they also "coined the term 'Connected Path Game' for Field Guide, referring to the pathways that link players to the creators and to each other". Biswas highlighted that players adopted a widely used Twitter hashtag (#FieldGuideToMemory), stating that "in a sense, Field Guide was designed to be anything but solo".

== Reception ==
Field Guide to Memory won the 2021 IndieCade Award in the "live action" category. Jeeyon Shim was awarded the 2021 Diana Jones Award for "Emerging Designer" for her work on Field Guide to Memory and other games. Kelly Knox included the game in a 2021 Nerdist list of one-player tabletop role-playing games.

An example journal entry which states that "the horned rat is not real" and that "Elizabeth is dead"

Nicole Carpenter of Polygon commented that the initial live run of Field Guide had extra "energy and momentum of the experience" as participants shared their journaling on social media at the same time with "each one representing a wildly divergent but strangely similar story"; however, Carpenter felt that the game "is no less interesting" in its PDF iteration. Academics Greg Loring-Albright and Wes Willison, writing for the Generation Analog 2021 conference, believed that had the designers not coined the term keepsake game, "Field Guide to Memory would be easy to classify as a journaling game". Additionally, praising the game's "material innovations" and its impressive temporality, they added that "the game emerged not in the moment of play, but rather in the cumulative effect of playing and having played. This work laid groundwork and then built upon it," noting that "moments of joy, surprise, and grief" perhaps would not "have worked without the daily rhythm of work (play) to set them up". Carpenter similarly wrote that Field Guide has "Inception-like experiences" as if embodying a character with fantasies of a life the player has never experienced, "then bringing that life into the physical world by carving it onto the pages of this book", which is reflected in the daily prompts back onto the player "in a way that gives them emotion and meaning."
