= Durance (role-playing game) =

Tabletop science fiction role-playing game by Jason Morningstar

- Cover
- Designers: Jason Morningstar
- Publishers: Bully Pulpit Games
- Publication: 2012
- Genres: Indie
- Systems: custom

Durance is a 2012 science fiction role-playing game by Jason Morningstar, independently published by Bully Pulpit Games, who also released Fiasco. The game was a 2011 entry on the annual Game Chef game design competition, and went on to raise $27,458 (639 backers) of its $5000 goal on kickstarter in June 2012.

== Description ==
Durance is a narrative style game for 3-5 players, played without preparation or a Game Master (GM) as is often the tradition in roleplaying games. Each player takes his or her turn coming up with a question to be resolved in a scene and the other players work out who should be part of the scene and then plays out that scene according to some very simple guidelines. The setting takes place on a distant colony with convicts working under the oversight of a governor and his or her marines. Society and power is split between the criminal society and those working for the government, named Authority. Each side depends on the other and the balance of power may shift in either direction, but since every player has one character on each side of the divide this is meant to create conflict and an interesting setting rather than player competition. This is depicted as a split triangle with the Governor at the top on the Authority side, and the Dimber Damber on the convict side. There are a total of five rungs on the ladder on each side, and the players must pick characters from different rungs and sides, with the rest being filled with minor character that may be taken over if a player's character dies.

The game has many innovative mechanics and ideas, but focuses on the narrative and roleplaying more than the game mechanics.

== Publication history ==
Jason Morningstar wrote Durance for the Game Chef 2011 competition, the theme of which was William Shakespeare and its ingredients were "daughter," "exile," "forsworn," and "nature". These chosen elements caused Morningstar to reflect on the Colonization of Australia in the 1780s and 1790s, so he set the game in a penal colony on a remote planet. Morningstar like the version that he created for Game Chef, so in July 2011 he started preparing it in hopes of publishing it through Bully Pulpit. About a year later, Bully Pulpit used Durance as their first Kickstarter and successfully raised $27,458 from 639 backers. Durance (2012) was released months later in both softcover and limited-edition hardcover as the first hard-bound publication from the company.
