= Jeeyon Shim =

Korean American game designer

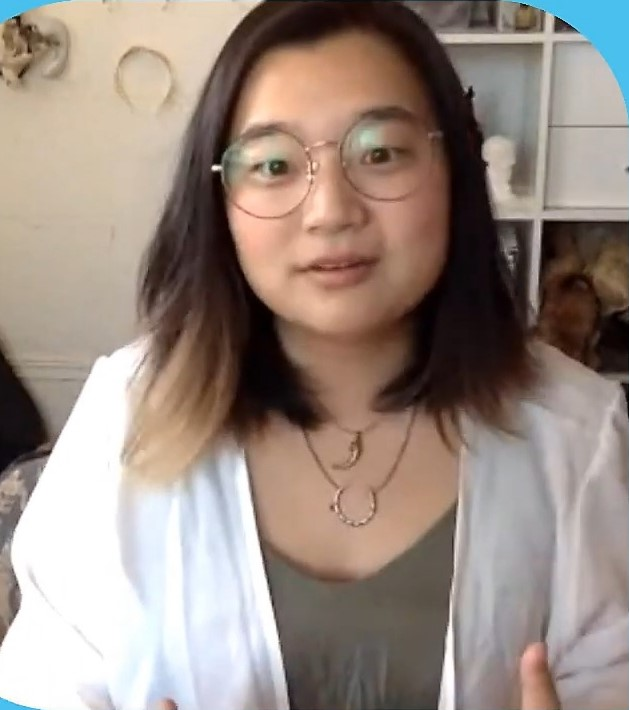
- Shim in 2020
- Occupation: Game designer
- Notable work: Field Guide to Memory
- Awards: IndieCade, Diana Jones Award, Dicebreaker
- Website: jeeyonshim.games

Jeeyon Shim is a second generation Korean American indie role-playing game and live action role-playing game designer and writer. A former outdoor educator, her body of work is strongly influenced by themes of connection to the natural world. Her narrative games often require players to create keepsake artifacts.

== Career ==
Due to the COVID-19 pandemic, Shim was made redundant from her outdoor education job and pivoted to "full-time game design in 2020". She is the co-designer on Field Guide to Memory (2021) with Shing Yin Khor. Field Guide to Memory centers on the creation of a journal through guided writing prompts with occasional live action mechanics, such as going on a hike in real life to echo a fictional hike experienced by the characters in-game. The Verge highlighted that "the pair defined keepsake games as both a genre and a useful shorthand for their work". Academics Greg Loring-Albright and Wes Willison highlighted that while Shim and Khor coined the term "keepsake game" in 2021, the collaborators have slightly different definitions with Shim "more interested in thematic concerns [...]. If Khor delimits how a keepsake game's keepsake object comes to be, Shim explores what that object is meant to do or mean. [...] Khor approaches the material keepsake object and works backwards through its procedural creation to its co-authors: the game designer and the player. Shim starts with the process and its intended thematics and situates the keepsake object as a result of those processes".

In addition to working with Khor on Field Guide to Memory, Shim has collaborated on indie role-playing game projects with Jason Morningstar and Lucian Kahn. Shim is also the creator of other keepsake games such as The Shape of Shadows, The Last Will and Testament of Gideon Blythe, and The Snow Queen which were all funded via crowdfunding campaigns. The Snow Queen is a game for two players, loosely based on the Hans Christian Andersen fairy tale. It adapts the game mechanics of Chess.

Linda Codega, for Io9 in 2022, stated that they are an "ardent fan and admirer of the short games" Shim has published on Itch.io which are "hallmarked by ethereal storytelling, psychological immersion, and a unique, punky design aesthetic. While many of her games follow the suit of Field Guide to Memory, in which a keepsake is created, many others dive into the transformative, otherwordly, and horrific". In 2023, Codega included Shim on a list of "people to follow" in the "Year Ahead in Tabletop Roleplaying Games" – they described Shim as "an innovative and fresh voice in tabletop design" pursuing sustainable and independent game design with "nearly a dozen games [released] over the past three years".

== Awards and nominations ==
Field Guide to Memory won the 2021 IndieCade Award in the best live game category. Shim was awarded the inaugural Diana Jones Emerging Designer Award in 2021. In 2022, Shim was nominated for "Designer of the Year" in the inaugural Tabletop Awards by Dicebreaker at PAX Unplugged.

== Personal life ==
Shim was born in the United States and currently lives in Northern California, where she's spent the majority of her life.

Shim developed Long COVID in 2022.

== Works ==
Title	Credits	Date	Notes	Ref.
Released
Pin Feathers/Cloud Studies	Designer	2018	Included on SFWA's 2018 Nebula Awards reading list	
Wait For Me	Co-designer	2020	Funded via Kickstarter campaign in 2020	
A Green Hour	Designer	2020	In The Ultimate Micro-RPG Book (Simon & Schuster)	
Trash Play	Co-designer	2020	Patreon Collaboration with Jason Morningstar	
Jiangshi: Haunted Tales Scenario Book	Scenario contributor	2020		
The Thaw	Designer	2021	Included in the Hibernation Games anthology; funded via Kickstarter in 2021	
Sea of Legends: Rise of the Ancients	Adventure writer	2021	Board game expansion published by Guildhall Studios; funded via Kickstarter in 2020	
Field Guide to Memory	Co-designer	2021	Funded via Kickstarter campaign in 2021	
Captain Swanhands	Co-designer	2022	Created with Grant Howitt	
Upcoming
The Shape of Shadows	Designer	TBA	Forthcoming game funded via Kickstarter campaign in 2021	
The Last Will and Testament of Gideon Blythe	Designer	TBA	Forthcoming game funded via Kickstarter campaign in 2021	
The Snow Queen	Designer	TBA	Forthcoming game funded via independent crowdfunding campaign in 2022	
The Longest Rest	Designer	TBA	Forthcoming game funded via Indiegogo crowdfunding campaign in 2022	
