= Emily Care Boss =

LARP and tabletop role-playing game designer

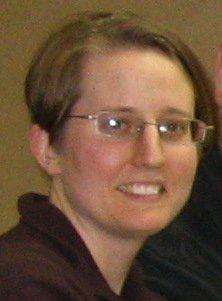
- Emily Care Boss in 2008
- Education: University of Massachusetts Amherst
- Occupation: Game designer
- Spouse: Epidiah Ravachol

Emily Care Boss is an indie roleplaying game designer, theorist and publisher. She was a foundational member of The Forge, an early leader in the indie role-playing game movement and is considered the creator of the American Freeform genre of roleplaying games, which combine indie RPG principles and mechanics with Nordic freeform and American chamber live action role-playing techniques. She has been referred to as the "Dean" of the North American school of structured freeform game design.

== Career ==
Emily Care Boss got involved with role playing games while at college in the 1990s, playing Ars Magica using a shared world setting created by friends. She credits talking with other users at the Forge Forums during the early 2000s with helping her to get involved in design and self-publishing. Her first game Breaking the Ice was published in 2005.

Boss and fellow Forge theorist Vincent Baker are co-credited with formulating the Lumpley Principle (a.k.a. Baker-Care or Baker-Boss Principle), which states, "System (including but not limited to 'the rules') is defined as the means by which the group agrees to imagined events during play." Further development of the Lumpley Principle describes player contributions as being assigned credibility by the other players in the game. She authored Dream Bear, a game about exploring dreams and symbolism. She also coined the concept of "bleed" at Ropecon 2007 and defined it as the emotional transfer between player and character, in either direction, during a role-playing game.

In addition to her design work, Boss is the founding owner of Black & Green Games, which is best known its romance-themed indie games, Breaking the Ice, Shooting the Moon, and Under My Skin. The three were collected into one volume as the Romance Trilogy in 2016. In 2009 and 2010 she published two volumes of RPG Zine, which stood for "Role Playing Girl". Many of her games have been noted as being adept at handling narratives of romance and sex, and Boss has been outspoken about the handling of love and sex in the design of RPGs and LARPs.

From 2005-2009 Boss co-wrote an RPG theory and design blog Fair Game, with fellow designer Meguey Baker. She was a contributor on a panel that wrote The Wyrd Con Companion Book 2012. She was a contributor to the role playing journals Push, Playground Worlds, the Knutepunkt publication States of Play, and the companion publications for WyrdCon in 2012 and 2013. She organized the JiffyCon series of indie roleplaying game (RPG) mini-conventions in Massachusetts. Her game Last Chance Noir is a LARP game inspired by the Intercon LARP convention she attends every year. She assisted with judging in the second "Golden Cobra Challenge" for LARPing in 2015. She was on the programming team for the Living Games Conference in 2014, helped in 2016, and chaired the conference in 2018.

Awards, Nominations, and Honors

Under My Skin won the Fastaval 2009 Player's Choice award. Bubblegumshoe, a Gumshoe System Teen Noir setting, written with Ken Hite and Lisa J. Steele, won the 2017 Gold ENnie Award for Best Family Game.

Breaking the Ice was nominated for three Indie Game Awards in 2005, including Game of the year. Romance Trilogy was nominated for the Diana Jones Award for Excellence in Gaming in 2017.

Boss was the Guest of Honour at Ropecon 2007 and Fastaval 2009.

== Personal life ==
Boss graduated from University of Massachusetts Amherst with a bachelor's degree in Social Thought and Political Economy and a master's degree in Forestry. Boss resides in Greenfield, Massachusetts and is married to fellow game designer Epidiah Ravachol, creator of Dread.

== Roleplaying bibliography ==
- Breaking the Ice, nominated for three Indie Game Awards in 2005, including Game of the year.
- Fluffy Bunny, 2005
- Heart of the Rose, 2007
- Shooting the Moon: All is Fair in Love and War, 2008
- The Colour Game, Tiny Tales of Romance, 2008
- Sign in Stranger, 2009
- Under My Skin, Winner of the Fastaval 2009 Player's Choice award.
- Dread House, a boardgame for children and adults, 2010.
- MonkeyDome, 2010
- Playing With Intent, a system to structure freeform games, 2012
- Misericord(e), 2013
- Remodel, an American Freeform game about women's experience in mid-life, 2013
- Blood on the Snow collaborator including a live action system for Robin Laws's DramaSystem Hillfolk, 2013
- Girls Elswehere collaborator, a supplement for Josh Jordan's game Heroine, 2013
- King Wen's Tower, premièred at Fastaval, 2014
- "Ma, Can I Help You with That?" nano game in #Feminism: A Nano-Game Anthology, published by Fëa Livia, 2016, and Pelgrane Press, 2017.
- Bubblegumshoe, designed with Kenneth Hite and Lisa Steele, published by Evil Hat Productions in June 2016.

== Publications ==
- White, William J.; Harviainen, J. Tuomas; Boss, Emily Care (2012). "Role-Playing Communities, Cultures of Play and the Discourse of Immersion". In Torner, Evan; White, William J. (eds.). Immersive Gameplay: Essays on Participatory Media and Role-Playing. Jefferson, North Carolina: McFarland & Company, Inc. ISBN 9780786468348.
- Boss, Emily Care (2008). "Key Concepts in Forge Theory". In Montola, Markus; Stenros, Jaakko (eds.). Playground Worlds: Creating and Evaluating Experiences of Role-Playing Games (PDF). Finland: Ropecon ry. ISBN 9789529235797. Archived from the original (PDF) on 2016-08-02.
- Boss, Emily Care (2006). "Collaborative Roleplaying: Reframing the Game" (PDF). Push: New Thinking About Roleplaying. 1.
