= Shing Yin Khor =

Malaysian-American artist and cartoonist

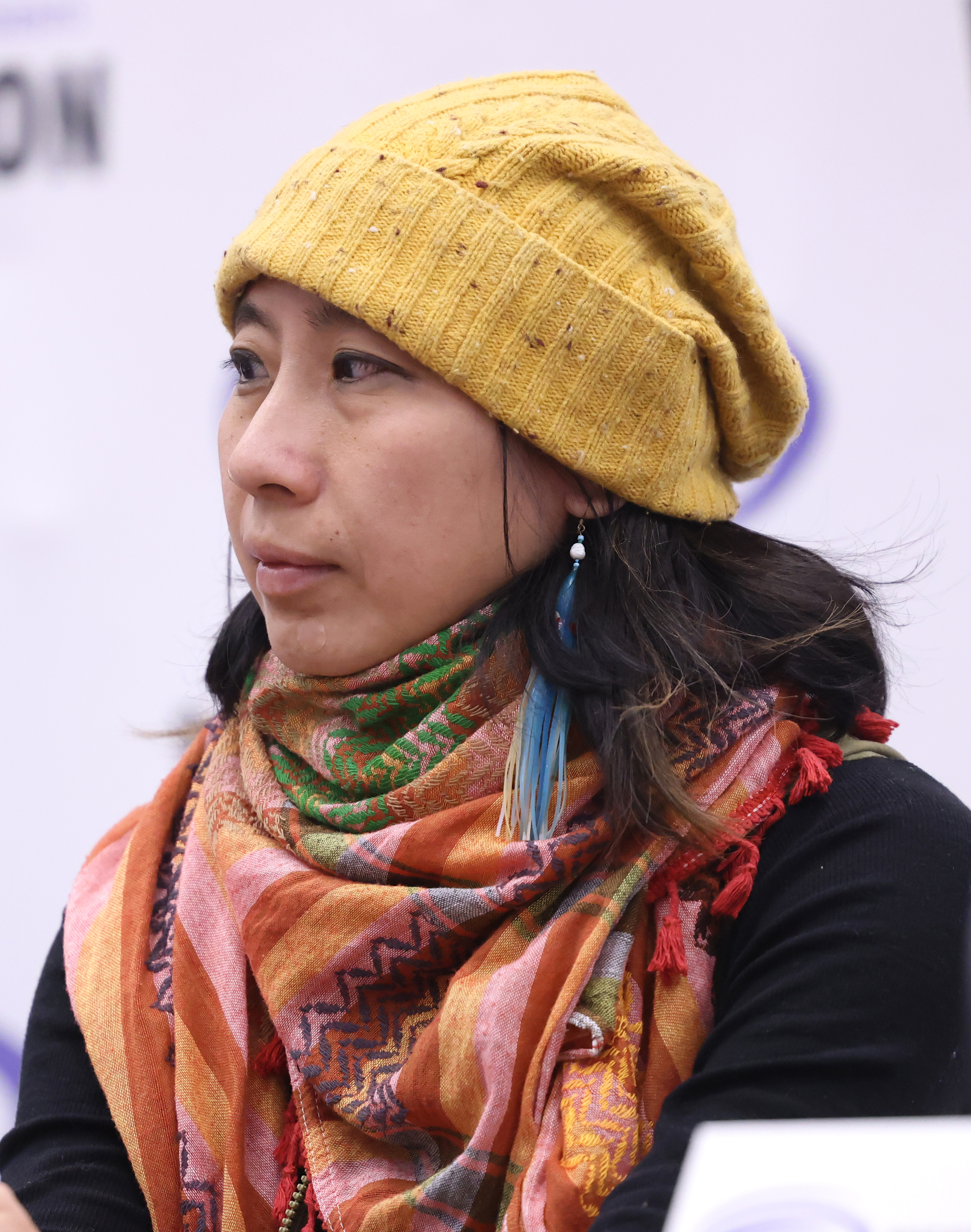
- Khor in 2025
- Born: 1982 or 1983 (age 42–43); Malacca City, Malacca, Malaysia
- Education: Whittier College (2005); School of Visual Arts (MFA, 2026)
- Occupations: Artist; cartoonist; game designer
- Writing career
- Notable awards: Ignatz Award (2018); IndieCade Awards (2021, 2022); Eisner Award (2022)
- Website: shingkhor.com

Shing Yin Khor is a Malaysian-American artist, cartoonist and game designer. They are the creator of the comics The American Dream? A Journey on Route 66 (2019), The Center for Otherworld Science (2014) and Say it with Noodles (2018), the last of which won them an Ignatz Award. Khor's middle grade graphic novel, The Legend of Auntie Po (2021), earned an Eisner Award and was a finalist for the 2021 National Book Award for Young People's Literature.

As a game designer, Khor is known for creating keepsake journaling games. They co-designed Field Guide to Memory (2021) which won an IndieCade Award. Khor's Remember August (2022) also won an IndieCade Award and The Bird Oracle (2025) was nominated for an ENNIE Award.

== Early life ==
Khor was born in Malacca City to Malaysian Chinese parents, growing up in the Philippines, and moving to the United States in 1999 at age 16. They settled in California in 2006 and in 2012, Khor became a naturalized citizen of the United States. Khor studied Technical Theatre and English at Whittier College, graduating in 2005.

== Career ==
Khor initially worked as a theatrical set and prop designer. In 2011, they created the photo web comic Marlowe the Monster which featured clay sculptures and sets they had created. Khor was then featured at San Diego Comic-Con 2012 in a "Small Press exhibition". Khor was an artist-in-residence at the Petrified Forest National Park in 2015 and at the Homestead National Historical Park in 2016. They have created installation art and sculpture such as Hamlet-Mobile (2016), The Last Apothecary (2016) and The Gentle Oraclebird (2017–present). Khor leads the installation and immersive art and production studio Three Eyed Rat.

=== The Center for Otherworld Science (2014–2018) ===
Khor created the webcomic The Center for Otherworld Science, in which scientists are experimenting on flora and fauna of a place called the Otherworld. These experiments have led to advances, such as eradicating sickle cell anemia, but are morally dubious. After an incident leads to the death of one worker, the survivors must deal with the fallout of the accident and face the emotional and existential consequences.

A review of the webcomic for The Beat said that it "combines otherworldly creatures and fantastic settings with the mundane details of working in a professional setting and the small moments shared between three coworkers. The result is a comic that feels both familiar and ethereal simultaneously, a sense that is only underscored by the simple and extremely effective art.

=== Say it with Noodles (2018) ===
Say it with Noodles: On Learning to Speak the Language of Food was a standalone comic about Khor's relationship with their grandmother and how cooking for someone can be a love language. It won the Ignatz Award for Outstanding Minicomic in 2018.

=== The American Dream? A Journey on Route 66 (2019) ===
The American Dream? A Journey on Route 66: Discovering Dinosaur Statues, Muffler Men, and the Perfect Breakfast Burrito is an autobiographical graphic novel by Khor. It described a road trip they took along U.S. Route 66, in part to discover themselves and the other America (outside of their home of Los Angeles) they knew little about. The novel covers the history of Route 66 and the boom and bust its populations have faced, while visiting and drawing kitschy tourist traps, giant sculptures and abandoned roadside attractions.

A reviewer for The A.V. Club said of the novel, "If not for Khor's art, the book might have still been a bit of a dry read. But rich with water colors and visible sketch lines under finished shapes, it feels organic and alive. It's rich with texture and soft shapes, smiling faces that are simple without being overly cartoonish. There are several double-page spreads that capture the incredible vistas and remarkable secrets Route 66 holds for travelers... Khor's awe and frustration and joy as they encounter new things are all palpable. It makes clear how Khor's own experiences and needs shaped their trip and the book itself, which leads gracefully into exploration of Khor's complicated relationship with America as an immigrant... It's a journey made up of the weird and wonderful, as well as the deeply concerning ways that people leave their mark on the world." Kirkus Reviews said, "Through bright, expressive watercolor illustrations, Khor portrays the memorable locations they pass through... They detail both the amusing (going to the bathroom outdoors) and emotional (loneliness and exhaustion) challenges of being a traveler. Khor's pilgrimage is as much an exploration of themself as it is of nostalgic Americana. Their travels inspire them to share insights into their path to atheism, their anger with xenophobia and racism—which are provoked when they find a motel labeled "American owned"—and the meaning of "home." Many of Khor's observations will resonate with those who have questioned national identity and the sense of belonging."

=== The Legend of Auntie Po (2021) ===
In 2021, Khor released their second full-length graphic novel and first middle grade historical fiction book The Legend of Auntie Po. Set shortly after the Chinese Exclusion Act, it focuses on a young girl named Mei and her father who work at a California logging camp and the stories Mei tells "of Paul Bunyan and Babe the Blue Ox, reimagined as the legends of Auntie Po and her faithful blue buffalo, Pei Pei". The Legend of Auntie Po was a 2021 finalist for the National Book Award for Young People's Literature and won the 2021 Eisner Award for Best Publication for Teens.

=== Game design ===
Khor is the co-designer on the narrative journaling game Field Guide to Memory (2021) with Jeeyon Shim. Field Guide to Memory won the 2021 IndieCade Award in the "Best Live Game" category. The Verge highlighted that "the pair defined keepsake games as both a genre and a useful shorthand for their work". Khor also designed the solo storytelling role-playing game A Mending (2021); the player follows prompts and stitches their journey on a pre-made cloth map.

In 2022, Khor created Remember August, a live keepsake game where they mailed participants letters as a one-time event. They also released a downloadable version of the game and its ephemera. It won the 2022 IndieCade Award for "Best Tabletop Design". They created The Bird Oracle, a keepsake journaling game, in 2025. It was nominated for the 2025 ENNIE Award in "Best Writing". The Bird Oracle was then one of twenty role-playing games to be featured on The Awards' winners list in 2026.

Also in 2025, they released Gods of Nothings, a live action role-playing game which involves the creation of a physical mask. In 2026, in collaboration with illustrator Jared Andrew Schorr, Khor designed the two-person postcard writing game January.

=== Other works ===
Khor has produced work for HuffPost, The Nib and The Toast. They also contributed to the comics anthology Elements: Earth. Khor received coverage from the Smithsonian for recreating other artworks in Animal Crossing: New Horizons.

In 2023, they worked as an adjunct lecturer at University of Southern California. Khor was in the 2023/2024 "Creators in Residence" cohort at the Los Angeles Public Library. Their short film Geronimo Was A Beaver (2024), which featured puppets Khor made, won the "Best Animated Documentary Award" at the 2025 Doc LA Festival. In 2025, they funded a "marionette opera and short film" titled The Last Fifteen Minutes on Kickstarter. The Last Fifteen Minutes was also Khor's thesis project at the School of Visual Arts; in 2026, they graduated with a Master of Fine Arts in Visual Narrative.

== Personal life ==
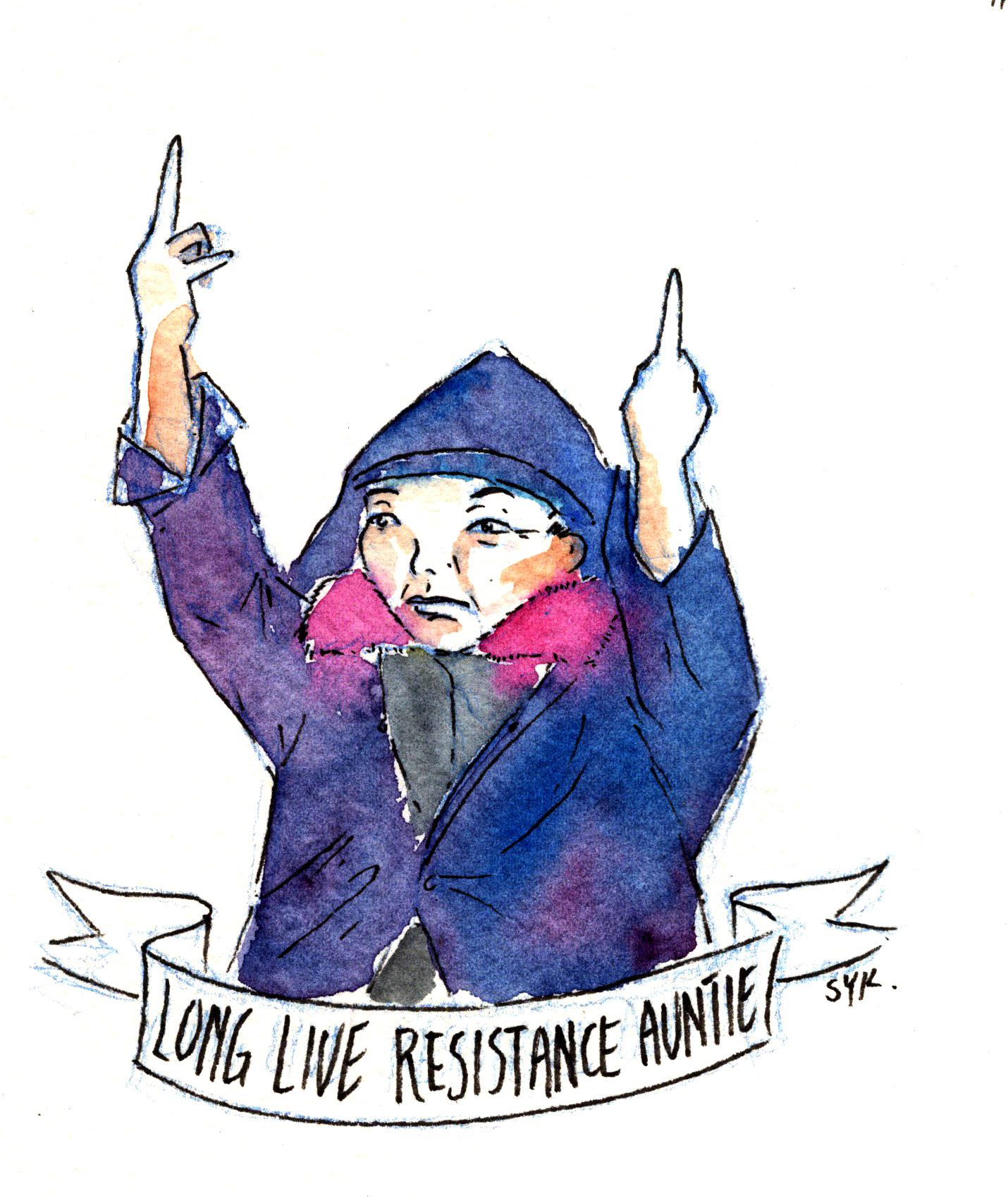
Resistance Auntie (2017) by Shing Yin Khor.

Khor is queer, and has indicated that their work, regardless of what they do, is political because they are doing it. In a 2017 interview with HuffPost, they said, "I do believe that the personal is political, and have always felt that writing about myself ― as a brown, immigrant woman ― is by default a political gesture because our voices are incredibly underrepresented in all creative fields." However, they also noticed their work became more political following the first election of President Donald Trump. Khor stated that their Resistance Auntie painting was based on a photo of a woman who gave Trump the middle finger on Inauguration Day. HuffPost noted that it "quickly went viral" and subsequently, Khor released the painting under a Creative Commons license which was also "a protest in itself".

Khor is non-binary and stated that they use gender-neutral pronouns.

== Awards and honors ==
Kirkus Reviews named The Legend of Auntie Po one of the best books of 2021. In 2022, Khor was included in the Out100 list.

Awards for Khor's work
Year	Work	Award	Category	Result	Ref.
2018	Say It With Noodles	Ignatz Award	Outstanding Minicomic	Won	
2021	Field Guide to Memory	IndieCade Awards	Best Live Game	Won	
2021	The Legend of Auntie Po	American Library Association	Best Graphic Novels for Kids	Selection	
2021	The Legend of Auntie Po	Cybils Award	Graphic Novel (Elementary/Middle Grade)	Finalist	
2021	The Legend of Auntie Po	National Book Award	Young People's Literature	Finalist	
2022	The Legend of Auntie Po	Association for Library Service to Children	Notable Children's Books	Selection	
2022	The Legend of Auntie Po	Eisner Awards	Best Publication for Teens	Won	
2022	Remember August	IndieCade Awards	Best Tabletop Design	Won	
2025	The Bird Oracle	ENNIE Awards	Best Writing	Nominated	

== Bibliography ==
=== As cartoonist ===
- Marlowe the Monster (2011)
- The Center for Otherworld Science (2014–2018)
- Small Stories (2017)
- The American Dream? A Journey on Route 66 (2019)
- The Legend of Auntie Po (2021)
- Tiny Adventure Journal

=== As writer ===
- What Made California the Golden State?: Life During the Gold Rush (2024)

=== As editor ===
- I was a Teenage Gargoyle (2012)
- Blood Root (2014)

=== Featured In ===
- Scene Shift (2022)
