= Night Sky Games =

Game publisher

Night Sky Games is an American game company that produces role-playing games (RPGs) and game supplements.

== Description ==
Meguey Baker played RPGs at a young age, starting with Dungeons & Dragons at age 7, and moving to Shadowrun, Cyberpunk and Ars Magica in later years. She came to believe that most RPGs catered to a narrow band of players; as a young mother she wanted to create RPGs that amplified underrepresented voices and stories, including accessibility to diverse players, play in different settings, play across generations and languages and other cultural division lines. In 2006, Baker founded Night Sky Games with those principles in mind.

The first game from the new publisher in 2006 was A Thousand and One Nights: A Game of Enticing Stories (2006), in which players take on the roles of courtiers in the Sultan's Court. Each player tells stories to the Sultan, trying to advance their personal ambitions while trying to avoid offending the wrong person. The other courtiers take on roles in the story as assigned by the storytelling courtier.

After a hiatus of several years, Night Sky released Trauma Games Presents: Murderous Ghosts in 2011, an expansion created by Vincent Baker for the Apocalypse World RPG.

The following year, Night Sky released Psi*Run, a revision by Meguey Baker of a story-telling RPG ashcan created by Chris Moore and Michael Lingner.

Also in 2012, Night Sky released Bacchanalia (2012) by Paul Czege and Michele Gelli, a storytelling card game set in both a Roman village and Roman mythology, and a revision of A Thousand and One Nights: A Game of Enticing Stories.

The following year saw the release of Meguey Baker's Valiant Girls, a nanogame about Ethiopian girls facing a challenge.

In 2015, Night Sky released another Meguey Baker creation, Playing Nature's Year, a collection of eight small games set in various seasons of the year.

== Reception and commentary ==
In the critical essay "The Self-Reflexive Table Top Role-Playing Game", Evan Torner notes that in 1,001 Nights, "Player-characters (PCs) tell stories in Court in which they cast each other as the stories' figures, but they may invoke the wrath of the Sultan and risk beheading (Safety), make progress toward their goals (Ambition), or seek a way out of this place (Freedom). In this fashion, the tale-within-a-tale enacts metaphors for the PCs' diegetic concerns. A story told by the licentious cook ostensibly about a Pied Piper of Hamelin figure may actually turn out to be about competing desires for the handmaiden whom he cannot woo. A Sinbad action-adventure tale might turn into a rags-to-riches slapstick when told by a poor character in envy of wealthier characters. The metaphorization of real material through fictional forms and the ambiguities that creates lies at the heart of this game." Torner suggests that what makes this game fun is "identifying how humans meddle with and subvert the very stories they are using to make an argument or confirm a normative point."

David Jara commented that 1,001 Nights "can be read (and played!) as a reflection on the practice of role-playing itself ...[Tabletop RPGs] can be understood as a practice where fiction is revealed as a mode of – and thus not in opposition to – real human interaction." Using this framework, Jara divided the game into "two narratological levels ... the digetic ... being the palace court ... and the second, the 'supernatural', hypo-diegetic, fairy-tale worlds of the stories told in court."

== Awards ==
- Playing Nature's Year was a finalist for an Indie RPG Award in the category "Most Innovative Game of 2015"
