= Fastaval =

Annual gaming convention held in Denmark

Fastaval is an annual gaming convention in Hobro, Denmark, with focus on role-playing games, live action role-playing games, board games, miniature wargaming and collectible card games. The first many years was held in or around Aarhus but the 2011 Fastaval was held in Silkeborg while the conventions from 2012 to 2024 were held at Mariagerfjord Gymnasiet in Hobro.

The convention has been held on the long weekend of Easter since 1986, with the exception of 1988 and 2020. It was held digital in 2021.

== The Otto ==
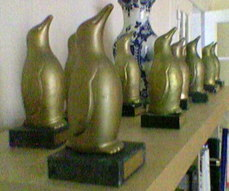
The Ottos during the 2005 edition of Fastaval.

Since 1992, Fastaval has presented awards to individuals and role-play scenarios in the form of gilded plaster penguins named Otto. Since 2022 the penguin has been made of plastic. The prizes are awarded at a banquet on the final day of the Fastaval event.

The award inherited its name from a character in the 1989 game called Ulloq Nunaqarfinnguagaluami. The number of Ottos awarded and the categories themselves have been adjusted steadily over the years. The majority of Ottos are awarded for aspects of role-playing scenarios. In 2003 category was introduced for live scenarios which was discontinued in 2006 in favor of keeping both live and tabletop scenarios in competition with each other. Every year, an Honorary Otto is awarded to an individual, group or project who have distinguished themselves by making an extraordinary contribution to Danish roleplaying.

=== 1992 Winners ===
- Best Scenario: Spor der skræmmer! by Paul Hartvigson
- Best Special Effects: A by Kresten Kjær Sørensen
- Best Game Master: Christian Raeder Clausen
- Honorary Otto: Mads Lunau

=== 1993 Winners ===
- Best Scenario: Ejnhemmir by Christine Gjørtz Dragsholm (a.k.a. Troels Chr. Jakobsen)
- Best game people: Ejnhemmir by Christine Gjørtz Dragsholm (a.k.a. Troels Chr. Jakobsen)
- Best Roles: Der var så dejligt ude på landet... by Anton Silver Stone and Jens Thorup Rasmussen
- Best Handouts: Operation Faust by Ask Agger
- Best Presentation: Maskeballet by Thomas Jakobsen and Jacob Berg
- Audience Choice: Indianernes Skat by Nikolaj Lemche and Peter Petersen
- Honorary Otto: Paul Hartvigson

=== 1994 Winners ===
- Best Scenario: Isabelle by Lars Andresen
- Best game people: Et Studie i Ondskab by Mads Lunau
- Best Roles: U.S.S. Atlantis by Ask Agger
- Best Effects: Laaste Døre by Thomas Sorensen Munkholt
- Best Roles: Dr. Frank by Malling ungdomsskoles rollespilshold
- Audience Choice: 'Et Studie i Ondskab' by Mads Lunau
- Honorary Otto: Troels Chr. Jakobsen

=== 1995 Winners ===
- Best Scenario: Tidens Ritual by Lars Andresen
- Best games persons: 'Tidens Ritual' by Lars Andresen
- Best Roles: Concierto de Aranjuez by Per von Fischer
- Best Effects: Et Hjerte af Sten by Anne Winter Ratzer and Soren Maagaard
- Best Presentation: Paladins Lampe by Kristoffer Apollo and Christian Savioli
- Audience Choice: Midnight Blue by Ask Agger
- Honorary Otto: Cool Fish Delivery

=== 1996 Winners ===
- Best Scenario: Dr. Hoffmann's Børn by Morten Juul
- Best game people: New York Coppers by Palle Schmidt
- Best Roles: Når Et Barn Elsker by Kasper Nørholm
- Best Effects: Vogterens Arving by Michael Erik Næsby
- Best Illustrations: New York Coppers: Gaden uden nåde by Palle Schmidt
- Best Presentation: Inkatemplets Hemmelighed by Flemming Sander Jensen and Per von Fischer
- Audience Choice: Oculus Tertius by Jacob Schmidt-Madsen
- Honorary Otto: Soren Parbæk

=== 1997 Winners ===
- Best Scenario: Arken by Alex Uth
- Best game people: Arken by Alex Uth
- Best Roles: Freden by Malik Hyltoft
- Best Effects: Følger heldet de tossede by Sune Schmidt-Madsen
- Best Illustrations: Nibelungentreue by Ask Agger
- Best Presentation: Riget by Claus Ekstrøm
- Audience Choice: Arken by Alex Uth
- Honorary Otto: Rollespilsmagasinet Fønix

=== 1998 Winners ===
- Best Scenario: Skyggernes Spil by Maiken "Malle" Nielsen and Maria Bergmann
- Best games persons: Madame Macbeth by Henrik Vagner
- Best Roles: Lydias Bryllup by Jesper Stein Sandal, Daniel BB Clausen and Peter Cornelius Moller
- Best Effects: Le Dernier Combat by Thomas Munkholt Sørensen and Lars Andresen
- Best Presentation: Le Dernier Combat by Thomas Munkholt Sørensen and Lars Andresen
- Audience Choice: Vågenat by Jacob Schmidt-Madsen
- Honorary Otto: Kristoffer Apollo and Mette Finderup

=== 1999 Winners ===
- Best Scenario: Deo Gratias by Frederik Berg Olsen
- Best game people: Dogme #4 - Monogami by Morten Jaeger (anonymously submitted)
- Best Roles: Den sidste sag by Lars Andresen
- Best Effects: Dr. Bundwalds Hemmelighed by Daniel BB Clausen et al.
- Best Presentation: Helt i Bund by Nicholas Demidoff
- Audience Choice: Nevermore by Henrik Vagner
- Honorary Otto: Not awarded

=== 2000 Winners ===
- Best Scenario: Messe for en Galning by Michael Eric Naesby and David Riis
- Best game people: Majgækken by Sanne Harder
- Best Roles: Det sidste korstog by Ask Agger
- Best Effects: Athinopa by Jonas Breum Jensen and Anders Vestergaard
- Best Presentation: Hjerterfri by Anders Skovgaard-Petersen and Palle Schmidt
- Audience Choice: Kongens By by Flemming Lindblad Johansen & Lone Gram Larsen
- Jury's Special Prize: Elysium by Mads L. Brynnum
- Honorary Otto: Peter Bengtsen

=== 2001 Winners ===
- Best Scenario: Fanden paa Væggen by Palle Schmidt
- Best games persons: Dødedans by Lars Andresen
- Best Roles: 'Fanden paa Væggen' by Palle Schmidt
- Best Effects: Being Max Møller by Max Møller
- Best Presentation: 1864 - for Gud, Konge og Fædreland by Klaus Dhiin and Sean Hoeper
- Audience Choice: Skyggesiden by Michael EC Sonne
- Jury's Special Prize: Brudefærd by Alex Uth
- Honorary Otto: Sara Hald

=== 2002 Winners ===
- Best Scenario: Turing Test by Lars Kroll
- Best games persons: Elevator by Sebastian Flamant
- Best Roles: Bondemænd og Biavlere by Frederik Berg Olsen
- Best Effects: Pest eller Kolara by Max Miller
- Best Presentation: Hvad natten bringer by Palle Schmidt and Lars Vilhelmsen
- Audience Choice: 'Bondemænd og Biavlere' by Frederik Berg Olsen
- Honorary Otto: Morten Juul

=== 2003 Winners ===
- Best Scenario: Fortæl mig by Jorgo A. Larsen and Alex Uth
- Best game people: Svanevang by Mikkel Bækgaard
- Best Roles: Darling er Død by Mette Finderup
- Best Effects: Lømler by Max Møller, Frederik Berg Olsen, Lars Vensild and Anders Skovgaard-Petersen
- Best Presentation: Mænd af Ære by Kristoffer Apollo
- Audience Choice: Drømmen om en konge i gult by Jacob Schmidt-Madsen
- Best Live: Meskalin of HC Molbech and Martin W. Jürgensen
- Live Audience Award: Fyraften by Eidolon LVE-Sector
- Honorary Otto: Natural Born Holmers

=== 2004 Winners ===
- Best Scenario: Samsara by Jacob Schmidt-Madsen
- Best game people: Samsara by Jacob Schmidt-Madsen
- Best Roles: Luftguitar by Palle Schmidt
- Best Effects: Et Lystspil by author group Absurth
- Best Presentation: Samsara by Jacob Schmidt-Madsen
- Audience Choice: Chiaroscuro by Mikkel Bækgaard
- Honorary Otto: Peter Brodersen

=== 2005 Winners ===
- Best Scenario: Det Hemmelige Selskab by Lars Andresen
- Best Storytelling: A Day in the Life by Mikkel Bækgaard
- Best Tools: SuperHeroes™ by Kristoffer Apollo and Sebastian Flamant
- MVP material: Det Halve Kongerige by Tobias Demediuk tether
- Best Dissemination: SuperHeroes™ by Kristoffer Apollo and Sebastian Flamant
- Jury's Special Prize: Unik by Klaus Meier Olsen
- Audience Choice: A Day in the Life by Mikkel Bækgaard
- Best Live Scenario: Persona by Maya Krone and Ryan Rohde Hansen
- Live Audience Award: Omringet by Mårten Krammer and Christian Møller Christensen
- Honorary Otto: Merlin P. Mann

=== 2006 Winners ===
- Best Scenario: Højt under Solen by Jacob Schmidt-Madsen
- Best Storytelling: Guernica by Klaus Meier Olsen
- Best Tools: Kongemord by Mikkel Bækgaard
- MVP material: Ulfheðnar by Alex Uth
- Best Dissemination: Den Røde Pest by Lars Andresen
- Jury's Special prize: Tupelo by Brian Rasmussen
- Audience Choice: Nantonaku Manga of Malik Hyltoft
- Honorary Otto Malik Hyltoft

=== 2007 Winners ===
- Best Scenario: Superheroes 3 by Kristoffer Apollo & Sebastian Flamant
- Best Storytelling: Doubt by Fredrik Axelzon & Tobias Wrigstad
- Best Tools: En Fandes Historie by Jorgo A. Larsen, Anna Lawaetz & Jacob Pondsgård
- Best Roles: Sparta by Morten Hougaard & Kristoffer Kjær Jensen
- Best Dissemination: Superheroes 3 by Kristoffer Apollo & Sebastian Flamant
- Jury's Special Prize: Doubt by Fredrik Axelzon & Tobias Wrigstad
- Audience Choice: Memoratoriet: Det rare sted by Morten Greis Petersen & Monica deer Traxl
- Honorary Otto: The National Association for Live Roleplay

=== 2008 Winners ===
- Best Scenario: Før Høsten by Klaus Meier Olsen & Jonas Trier-Knudsen
- Best Storytelling: Monstre by Simon Steen Hansen
- Best Tools: Teknisk Uheld by Fredrik Axelzon Per Wetterstrand & Tobias Wrigstad
- Best Roles: Felicias Fortælling by Sanne Harder Flamant
- Best Dissemination: Løgstør by Mikkel Bækgaard
- Jury's Special Prize: 'Løgstør' by Mikkel Bækgaard
- Audience Choice: Felicias Fortælling by Sanne Harder Flamant
- Honorary Otto: Brian Rasmussen

=== 2009 Winners ===
- Best Scenario: Reservoir Elves by Kristian Bach Petersen
- Best Storytelling: Tortur by Troels Ken Pedersen
- Best Tools: Dyst by Kristoffer Rudkjær, Anders Frost Bertelsen and Morten Hougaard
- Best Roles: Intet Hjem, Tusind Stjerner by Regitze Illum
- Best Dissemination: Kreativ Klasse by Klaus Meier Olsen
- Jury's Special: Imperiet compiled by Johannes Busted Larsen and Lars Andresen
- Audience Choice: Under My Skin by Emily Care Boss
- Honorary Otto: Jesper Wøldiche

=== 2010 Winners ===
- Best Scenario: Vasen by Mikkel Bækgaard
- Best Storytelling: Vasen by Mikkel Bækgaard
- Best Tools: Hjertebrand by Frikard Ellemand
- Best Roles: Salvation by Simon Steen Hansen
- Best Dissemination: Slavehandleren fra Ascalon by Johannes Busted Larsen
- Jury's Special: Magiens Endeligt by Louise Floor Frellsen
- Audience Choice: The Journey by Fredrik Axelzon
- Honorary Otto: Vi Åker Jeep

=== 2011 Winners ===
- Best Scenario: BZ'at by Frikard Ellemand
- Best Storytelling: Scrapbog by Eva Fog
- Best Tools: Femten Mand by Simon Steen Hansen, Niels Jensen and Anders Troelsen
- Best Roles: BZ'at by Frikard Ellemand
- Best Dissemination: 'Femten Mand' by Simon Steen Hansen, Niels Jensen and Anders Troelsen
- Jury's Special Prize: Børnene fra Boldbane 7 by Sally Khallash & Morten Greis Petersen
- Audience Choice: Nazisatankirkekrig 2: Unholy Raptor Edition by Benjamin Jorgensen, Milton Felice Brambati Lund & Anders Bo Forest
- Honorary Otto: Lars Andresen

=== 2012 Winners ===
- Best Scenario: Spor by Alex K. Uth
- Best Storytelling: Lad verden brænde by Peter Fallesen
- Best Tools: Verdens ende, by Nina Runa Essendrop
- Best Roles: Lille Liverpool, by Mikkel Bækgaard
- Best Dissemination: Tilbagefald, by Max Miller
- Jury's Special Prize: Dancing with the Clans by The Violator, Lady and Raven fra Fyn
- Audience Choice: Dancing with the Clans, The Violator, Lady and Raven fra Fyn
- Best Boardgame: Siege Perilous by Martin Bødker Enghoff
- Honorary Otto: Klaus Meier Olsen & Kristoffer Rudkjær

=== 2013 Winners ===
- Best Scenario: Plexiglas by Morten Jaeger
- Best Storytelling: Det sidste eventyr by Max Miller
- Best Tools: Cirkus uden grænser by Danny Meyer Wilson
- Best Roles: Suldrup by Mikkel Bækgaard
- Best Dissemination: Thorvald Stauning - Varulvejæger by Kristian Bach Petersen
- Jury's Special Prize: Depereo by Asbjørn Olsen
- Best Games Experience: Sarabande by Maria & Jeppe Bergmann-Hamming
- Best Boardgame: Stock Bubbles Jeppe Norsker
- Honorary Otto: Jesper Heebøll Arbjørn

=== 2014 Winners ===
- Best Scenario: Outlaw by Anders Frost Bertelsen & Simon Steen Hansen
- Best Storytelling: Manden med barnevognen by Alex K. Uth
- Best Tools: Fordømt ungdom Lars Andresen & Mette Finderup
- Best Roles: Fredløs by Anders Frost Bertelsen & Simon Steen Hansen
- Best Presentation: All for One (and Metal for Me) by Klaus Meier Olsen
- Jury's Special Prize: Run Them Again by Moyra Turkington & Brand Robins
- Best Games Experience: Mass Effect: 2157 by Niels Jensen, Thomas Skuldbøl & Anders Troelsen
- Best Boardgame: Honour Among Thieves by Martin Bødkler Enghoff
- Honorary Otto: DirtBusters

=== 2015 Winners ===
- Best Scenario: Forrykt, by Marie Bergmann Hamming and Jeppe Bergmann Hamming
- Best Storytelling: Six Months, Three Days by James Stuart and Sara Williamson
- Best Tools: Forrykt by Maria og Jeppe Bergmann Hamming
- Best Roles: Augustas Skygge by Kristoffer Rudkjær
- Best Presentation: Afstand by Morten Jæger
- Jury's Special Prize: Hope Was The Last Thing in The Box by Brand Robins
- Best Games Experience: Forrykt, by Marie Bergmann Hamming and Jeppe Bergmann Hamming
- Best Boardgame: Hivemind by Kasper Lapp
- Honorary Otto: Claus Raasted

=== 2016 Winners ===
- Best Scenario: Indtil Vi Finder Ham by Anders & Rasmus Troelsen
- Best Storytelling: Indtil Vi Finder Ham by Rasmus og Anders Troelsen
- Best Tools: På Røven I Marienburg by Kristian Bach Petersen
- Best Roles: Testamentet by Lars Kaos Andresen
- Best Presentation: Testamentet by Lars Kaos Andresen
- Jury's Special Prize: Gargantuan by Troels Ken Pedersen
- Best Games Experience: På Røven I Marienburg by Kristian Bach Petersen
- Best Innovation, Boardgame: Kosmonauter i Krise by Morten Brøsted
- Best Boardgame: Mother by Håkan Almer
- Honorary Otto: Simon James Pettitt

== Guests of honor ==
The convention has over time included a couple of international well-known roleplaying designers:

- 1994: Mark Rein·Hagen (Vampire: The Masquerade)
- 1995: Michael Pondsmith (Castle Falkenstein)
- 1996: David Berkman (Theatrix) plus Gunilla Johnsson and Michael Petersén (Kult)
- 1997: Keith Herber - furthermore, David Berkman attended as a regular visitor
- 2000: Steve Jackson (Steve Jackson Games)
- 2005: Greg Costikyan (Paranoia, Toon)
- 2009: Emily Care Boss (Black & Green Games)
- 2010: Julia Ellingboe (Stone Baby Games)
- 2011: Luke Crane and Jared Sorensen
- 2012: Lizzie Stark (Leaving Mundania)
- 2013: D. Vincent Baker (Dogs in the Vineyard)
- 2014: Mark Rein·Hagen (Vampire: The Masquerade)
- 2016: Jackson Tegu (Kaleidoscope - http://www.photographsoflightning.com/)
- 2017: Jason Matthews (Twilight Struggle)
- 2018: Avery Alder
- 2019: Quintin Smith & Matt Lees (Shut Up & Sit Down)
