= The Shab-al-Hiri Roach =

Role-playing game by Jason Morningstar

- Game Chef print & play cover 2005
- Designers: Jason Morningstar
- Publishers: Bully Pulpit Games
- Publication: 2005
- Genres: 1920s academic black comedy
- Systems: custom
- Website: bullypulpitgames.com/games/roach/

The Shab-al-Hiri Roach is a role-playing game by Jason Morningstar, independently published by Bully Pulpit Games.

== Description ==
The game is GM-less and designed for single-session play at the end of which a winner is determined. Its tone is black comedy, lampooning academia.

The game is about the internal politics of a buttoned-down New England college campus in 1919. The titular roach is a soul-eating telepathic insect bent on destroying human civilization. A major part of play is which characters are under the control of the roach and its offspring.

The goal of the game is to be the player with the most reputation at the end of the game. While being under the influence of "the roach" allows the player to gain reputation more easily, it is not possible to win the game while under this control.

== Publication history ==
Jason Morningstar thought of the core ideas behind The Shab-al-Hiri Roach while thinking about both the topic of Lovecraftian horror and his own personal fear of cockroaches. Morningstar submitted this game to the Game Chef 2005 competition, where it was among the nine best games chosen from the 38 entrants as one of the "Inner Circle". The Shab-al-Hiri Roach continued to undergo revisions as Morningstar, Steve Segedy, and Patrick M. Murphy founded Bully Pulpit Games, and the game was in its 45th revision (since they started counting) by Thanksgiving 2005. The Shab-al-Hiri Roach went on sale on March 10, 2006; the small press company Bully Pulpit printed only 100 copies, and the company ordered a second printing before all the copies sold out by May 12. Most of those 200 reprints went to the company's new partner, Indie Press Revolution, who got the game into wider circulation and sold their 180 copies by September 26.
