= Studio Cypher =

Indiana-based game development studio

- Company type: For profit
- Industry: Games
- Founded: 2005; 20 years ago in Bloomington, Indiana, United States
- Founders: Will Emigh, Nathan Mishler, and Ian Pottmeyer
- Headquarters: United States
- Website: studiocypher.com

Studio Cypher is a game development studio in Bloomington, Indiana founded by Will Emigh, Nathan Mishler, and Ian Pottmeyer in 2005. The studio creates games combining video game technology with real-world interaction, which the studio refers to as "non-games".

== Games ==
Studio Cypher's first independent project was a series of alternate reality game interactive online novels, "The Cyphers Episodes". The story appeared over multiple websites with embedded puzzles. Players were able to pay a subscription fee to enhance their experience of the novels.

The studio created six games for The Field Museum of Natural History's Ancient Americas exhibit illustrating aspects of innovation in ancient technology.

In 2013, Studio Cypher used Kickstarter to fund their game Stickers In Public, which places physical, moveable stickers with game rules around a public space. Nathan Mishler debuted the game at E3 2013, and it was showcased at IndieCade. The studio created a version of Stickers in Public for TEDxBloomington in 2013.

In 2019, the studio published Diorama Detective, a family-friendly AR mystery game.
