= Game Expo East Kent =

Annual game expo held in Margate, UK

GEEK
- Status: Defunct
- Genre: Retro gaming; Indie gaming
- Frequency: Annually
- Venue: Winter Gardens; Dreamland Margate
- Locations: Margate, England
- Years active: 2012–2020
- Founded: 2011
- Founder: Kate Kneale; Tom Kneale
- Attendance: 50,000 (2019)
- Organiser: Marine Studios
- Website: GEEK Play

Game Expo East Kent (GEEK) was a retro gaming expo in held in Margate, UK. The annual event was held during the February half term break, with the slogan "Meet, Make, Play". It was founded by Houghton Kneale Design and Marine Studios in 2011, and created by director Kate Kneale and her son Tom to encourage families to meet and interact with game developers and artists.

Beginning in 2012, the event was initially held at the Winter Gardens, but started taking place at the amusement park Dreamland Margate in 2017. GEEK showcased the history of games of various kinds, from board games, pinball machines and the earliest PC games, arcade games and video game consoles, to the most recent games including indie games, virtual reality games and augmented reality games. The exhibition had hundreds of consoles from very early models to current models, all of which were playable, and also included talks, presentations and workshops.

== GEEK Expos ==
GEEK 2012 was the first GEEK expo, running in 15-19 February. The event began with a panel discussion by Adrian Hon, Rory Cellan-Jones, Ian Livingstone, Laura Sandys, and Gordon MacSween. During the event, people took part in a Guinness World Record for the Largest Tournament of Pong, and succeeded with over 256 players. The tournament was won by Robert Dixon. The event also featured an exhibition focused on providing an access point to education and training in gaming. GEEK returned in 2013, running in 21-24 February, where the event saw a visitor increase of over a third. It introduced virtual reality games, augmented reality games and educational games, and featured pinball machines from The Pinball Parlour in Ramsgate.

GEEK 2014 ran in 21-23 February, and introduced modern video games as the main attraction and had the biggest Minecraft Cave in the UK, although the Arcade section was absent. The event also featured a cosplay parade called the Cosplay Masquerade, card games, board games, arts and crafts, and a recording of the gaming podcast Retro Asylum. During the event, the record for the quickest Super Mario Kart time trial on the Mario Circuit 1 track was broken by previous record-holders Sami Cętin and Leyla Hassano. Later that year, GEEK ran a special "Heroes and Villains" weekend event at the Custard Factory in Digbeth in 19-21 September 2014.

GEEK 2015 ran in 20-22 February and saw the return of the Arcade section, and was organised in themes such as space. The event featured games designed by students from Marlowe Academy, tournaments for Minecraft, Halo, Hearthstone, Call of Duty and Nosgoth, and classic retro tournaments including games like Sonic the Hedgehog, Super Mario Kart, Street Fighter II: The World Warrior and Super Smash Bros. Melee.

Following an absence during 2016, GEEK returned in 2017, running in 17-19 February at Dreamland and co-organised by Bits and Bytes. GEEK 2017 featured an official Mario Kart Anniversary Tournament to celebrate the 25th anniversary of the Mario Kart series, held in Dreamland's Roller Room, and a 2000 AD exhibition by Rufus Dayglo to celebrate the magazine's 40th anniversary. Visitors could also play the games Renga and Space Toads Mayhem, which was part of the Indie Zone, and go to the Demystify Bar to meet app developers; the bar showcased Warhammer and hosted a Raspberry Pi Jam (a small computer used in electronics, projects, etc.). In 2018, GEEK ran in 16-18 February. The expo was given a space theme to celebrate the 40th anniversary of Space Invaders, and also celebrated the 10th anniversary of Super Smash Bros. Brawl with a grand franchise tournament. There was also the Jedi Fight Academy, which taught upcoming Jedis lightsaber skills, including those taught by actor Andrew Lawden.

In late 2018, GEEK, aiming to expand its reach globally, announced that it would be held in China instead of Margate in 2019, and explore 30 other locations in the UK. The event set a new record with 50,000 attendees, before being put on hiatus in 2020 due to the COVID-19 pandemic. GEEK created a one-off series of locally organised festivals named "Back and Fill", set to run in 23 October-1 November 2020 (with the backup date being February 2021).
