= Eliss =

2009 video game

- App icon
- Designer: Steph Thirion
- Platform: iOS
- Release: March 6, 2009
- Genre: Puzzle
- Mode: Single-player

Eliss is a puzzle video game developed and published by San Francisco-based developer Steph Thirion. It was released for the iPhone OS on March 6, 2009.

Eliss' gameplay revolves around filling "squeesars" with planets of like color and size. Planets can be combined, split, and moved around using the multi-touch interface. Further complication is added by passing red stars and vortices.

== Gameplay ==
Each sector has a required number of squeesars that must be filled to advance to the next stage. Players can manipulate multiple objects at a time using the multi-touch capabilities of the iPhone. Planets of like color can be combined, resulting in a larger planet, or divided (using a reverse-pinching motion), creating two smaller planets. Overlapping planets of different colors decreases health as well as shrinking the size of clashing planets. Red stars transverse the screen causing damage to all planets that they touch and should be avoided, while transient vortices attract all planets not held down. Energy and slow-down powerups appear to aid the player. A level ends when the required number of squeesars are filled, or all health is lost.

== Development ==
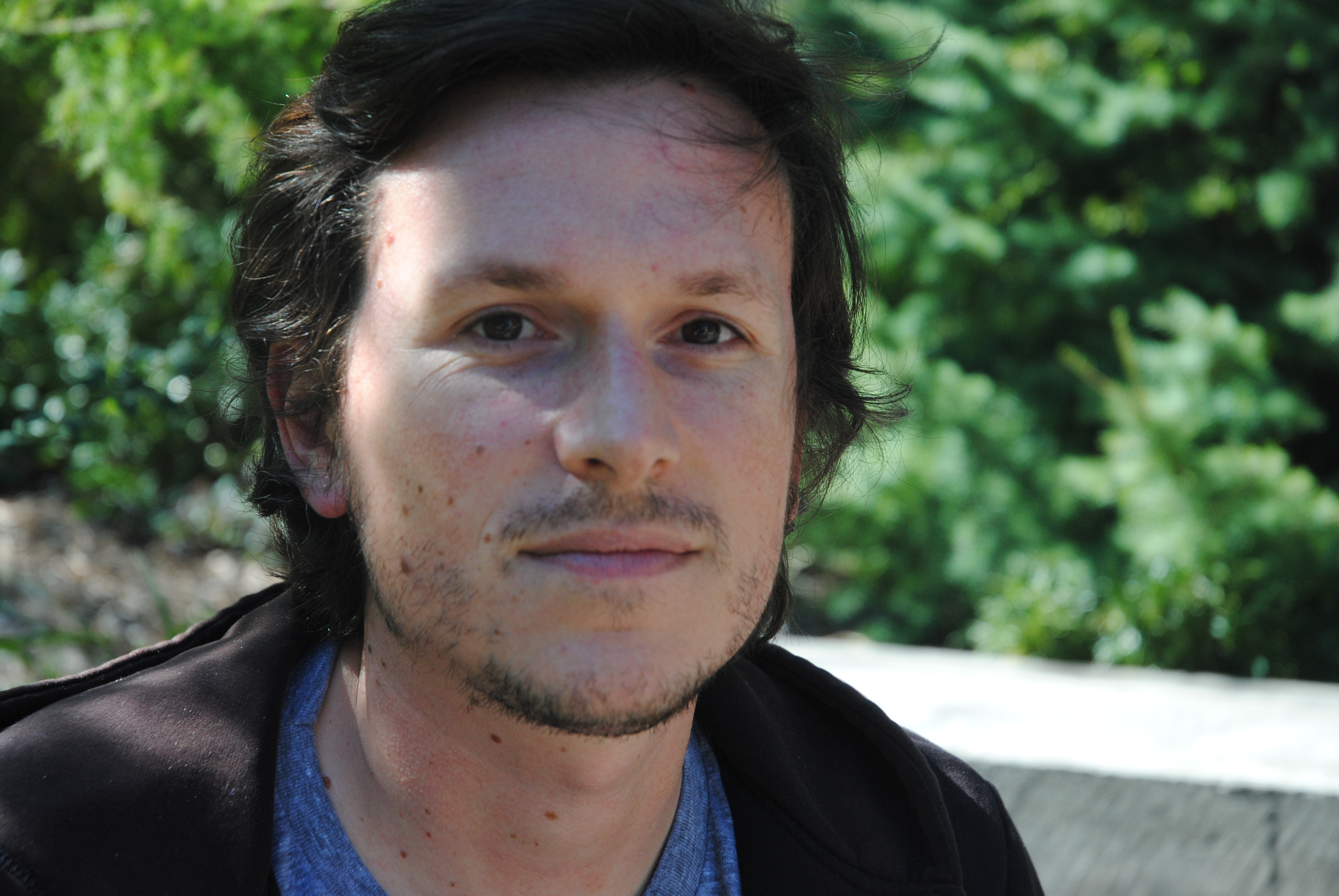
Thirion, 2009

Eliss was built by Steph Thirion. It is a multitouch puzzle game. Thirion released an expanded edition of the game, Eliss Infinity, for iOS in February 2014, and later, for Android in June. (Note: The original game was previously not available on Android.) The June release came with upgrades for the interface, sounds, and gentler difficulty curve. The game's 2009 original and 2014 updated soundtracks were also released in June as two digital EPs.

An updated version, called Eliss Infinity (stylized as Eliss ∞), was released for iOS and Android in early 2014 and mid-2014, respectively. The game was included in the Humble Mobile Bundle 6.

== Reception ==
Eliss received generally positive reception, identified as the "first truly great mobile game" by GameZebo. Eliss won the Auteur Award at IndieCade (the International Festival of Independent Games) in 2009. Destructoid writer Brad Nicholson was critical of the game's difficulty curve, feeling that the action gets too hectic and hard to follow. The author notes, however, that the patch allegedly fixed the difficulty issue, though he was not able to try the patched version before the review was conducted. MacWorld writer David Price found the gameplay of Eliss Infinity engaging and fast, praising it for its good difficulty curve. GameZebo writer Joe Jasko praised it as an improvement on an already great game, thanks particularly to its endless mode.
