= NIBCARD Games =

Nigerian tabletop game publisher

- Industry: Games
- Founded: 2016
- Founder: Kenechukwu Cornelius Ogbuagu

NIBCARD Games is a Nigerian tabletop game publishing company founded by Kenechukwu Cornelius Ogbuagu in 2016. The name stands for Nigerian Board Card, Roleplay and Dice. It aims to foster a sustainable tabletop gaming industry in Nigeria by creating culturally relevant games that resonate with local and international audiences. Nibcard also operates a game café in Abuja and convenes the annual African Boardgame Convention (AB Con).

Their games focus on solving problems in society. Topics include ranching conflicts, homebuilding, Sustainable Development Goals, and migration. NIBCARD Games won the 2021 Diana Jones Award.

== History ==
Nibcard Games traces its origins to 2013, when founder Kenechukwu Cornelius “KC” Ogbuagu designed his first board game during a university strike in Nigeria. At the University of Calabar, he quickly took to using everyday materials such as cardboard and stones to create a dice rolling and card drafting game for he and his friends. This initial interest and the warm response inspired him to turn this into a profession.

In 2016, he officially registered Nibcard with Nigeria’s Corporate Affairs Commission, having already developed several prototypes. The company gained traction when, in 2017, NIBCARD partnered with Voluntary Service Overseas to produce educational board game Luku Luku. NIBCARD also received a grant from the International Organization for Migration to create My World Trip. Also in 2016, building on its growing influence, the company inaugurated the African Boardgame Convention (AB Con), an annual gathering for tabletop game enthusiasts, designers, and publishers across the continent. The convention, which attracts hundreds of attendees each year, underscores Nibcard’s role in shaping an African-centred board gaming industry. It has been run by generous donations backed on Kickstarter and also by attendees, with increasing number of participants. The convention will celebrate its landmark 10th anniversary in 2026.

In 2019, Ogbuagu founded a game cafe in Abuja. The same year, three games published by NIBCARD debuted at the African Board games Convention, the largest tabletop game event in Africa. The café quickly became a community hub, offering a library of over 600 games, trained stewards, and curated experiences for families, schools, and corporate teams.

Through its commitment to cultural relevance, innovation, and education, Nibcard has become a pioneering force in Africa’s creative and gaming sectors. Nibcard also continues to build a community of Nigerian designers and game enthusiasts who design, publish, review, and collect their own games, bringing a tabletop gaming culture to Nigeria. Many other gaming communities in Nigeria, including those based in Enugu, Jos and Nasarawa have strong ties to Nibcard, with key members having been game masters at some point and working with the company. Notably, the South East Boardgame Convention (SEB Con) was founded by Tobenna Nwosu, a game master and active volunteer with Nibcard and AB Con. Femi Olusanya, another former volunteer and active game master, created Centroid Games, which started off with an exclusive publishing deal with Nibcard and showcases a growing tabletop gaming industry.

== Products and services ==
Games: Nibcard has designed and manufactured over 50 in house games. Titles include: Hut Alive, Village War, Irin Ajo, Campus Wahala, No Gree!, Fight in the Hive, Na Lie, Dicemo, Keep Safe, Wan Wan Touch, Bidding Room, The Outsider, Greatest Nigerian among popular entrants in the Nigerian tabletop industry. Nibcard has also manufactured over 20 games for organizations and individuals such as Owonikoko and Instant words for Centroid games, Word Jumble for Lydem Games, The Peace Trip, and Bible Guru for ICE Games.

Publishing & Production: Beyond its own titles, Nibcard manufactures games for other African designers and organisations, filling a crucial role in the regional board game industry's supply chain. It works with companies seeking to develop games for religious, professional and alternative ideas. Nibcard emphasises physical and social gameplay, as well as embedding Nigerian or African narratives in every game. Rather than perfecting a game in isolation, Nibcard continually iterates, uplifted by player feedback.

Game Café: Located in Gwarinpa, Abuja, the café offers a gaming library (~250–300 games), trained game masters, multiple gaming zones and different themed events weekly. It serves as a community hub for families, gamers, schools, and corporate teams.

African Boardgame Convention (AB Con): An annual event dedicated to bringing together tabletop gamers, designers, and publishers across Africa. It includes game showcases, panel sessions, tournaments, themed games, and industry networking.

== Recognition and impact ==
Nibcard has received recognition both domestically and internationally. It has been featured in major outlets, including CNN and NTA, and is recognised as a leader in the domestic tabletop gaming industry.

It has also received recognition through its standout Kickstarter campaigns for the AB Con, as well as receiving the prestigious 2021 Diana Jones Award for excellence in recognition of its game designs and publishing, mentorship, cafe operations and creation of a community of new makers across Nigeria and the African continent. The African Boardgame convention has also been well-received and now welcomes over 500 attendees.

Nibcard has been able to partner with local diplomatic missions, development companies and educational institutions to create games focusing on migration, religious awareness and tolerance, cultural appreciation and sustainable development to bring learning in an informative and helpful manner.
