= Coyote & Crow =

Tabletop fantasy role-playing game

- Designers: Kenna Alexander
- Publishers: Coyote & Crow
- Publication: 2021
- Genres: Tabletop Role Playing Game
- Players: 2+
- Setup time: 5+ minutes (Session 0 and Session 1 usually take longer than following sessions)
- Playing time: 30-240
- Chance: Medium
- Age range: 12+

Coyote & Crow is a science fantasy tabletop role-playing game by Kenna Alexander. The game was designed by a team of Native Americans from more than a dozen tribes. The game is set in an alternate future of the Americas, where thanks to a natural disaster, colonization never happened. Coyote & Crow's setting is the metropolis Cahokia, which is based on the Mississippi River. Coyote & Crow's first expansion book, Ahu Tiiko, focuses on a murder mystery in a forest village.

== Reception ==
Coyote & Crow launched one of the largest Kickstarter Gaming campaigns ever, raising $1,073,453.

Coyote & Crow was nominated for a Nebula Award for Best Game Writing in 2021. It subsequently won the Diana Jones Award for excellence in tabletop gaming and the 2022 Origins Award for Best RPG Core Book, awarded at Origins Game Fair in 2023.

Alex Meehan for Dicebreaker named Coyote & Crow one of the best tabletop role-playing games to play in 2024.
