= Analog Game Studies =

Academic journal

- Discipline: game studies, fan studies, media studies, cultural studies
- Language: English
- Edited by: Edmond Y. Chang, Aaron Trammell, Shelly Jones, Evan Torner, Megan Condis

Publication details
- History: 2014–present
- Publisher: ETC Press, Play Story Press (United States)
- Frequency: 3 to 5 issues annually

Standard abbreviations
- ISO 4: Analog Game Stud.

Indexing
- ISSN: 2643-7112

Links
- Journal homepage

Analog Game Studies (AGS) is a peer-reviewed open-access academic journal dedicated to "the academic and popular study of games containing a substantial analog component". AGS has established itself alongside similar journals including the International Journal of Role-Playing, Game Studies, Board Game Studies Journal, and Boardgame Historian. AGS is regularly included on scholarly and university research guides on game studies.

The first five volumes of the journal were published through ETC Press. It is currently published through Play Story Press Consortium. The editor-in-chief is Edmond Y. Chang (Ohio University).

== Analog Games ==
Analog Games refer to non-video games. Marco Arnaudo of Indiana University argues that that Games Studies, particularly Games History, needs to include Analog games as a significant subfield within the discipline.

== History ==
The articles in AGS frequently approach Games Studies through intersectional lenses of race, gender, sexuality, disability, and other identities and experiences. Analog Game Studies launched its first issue on August 1, 2014. The editors were Aaron Trammell, Evan Torner, and Emma Waldron. The idea for the journal emerged from conversations at the national conference of the Popular Culture Association/American Culture Association (PCAACA) in March 2013, which was held in Washington, DC. According to the inaugural editors, "Analog Game Studies is committed to providing a periodically published platform for the critical analysis, discussion of design, and documentation of analog games."

In 2018, AGS was a finalist for the Diana Jones Award for Excellence in Gaming, citing that "over the last four years the journal has established itself as a place where scholars of non-digital games discuss their research in an accessible manner. ...It is an important scholarly voice in the analytical tradition discussing hobby games that has, in the past, included sites such as Interactive Fantasy, The Forge, and the Knutepunkt books."

== Format and Editorial Policy ==
Since its founding in 2014, the journal publishes three to five issues a year. Each issue contains three to six scholarly articles, academic book reviews, and even interviews.

AGS publishes in English but includes authors and perspectives from around the world.

Analog Game Studies uses a peer review process that stresses mentorship, collaboration, transparency, conversation, and timeliness. Depending on the number of issues, the journal accepts between 9 and 15 articles a year.

== Topics Covered ==
- analog games
- game studies
- board games
- card games
  - Magic: The Gathering
- tabletop role-playing games
  - Dungeons and Dragons
  - actual play
- live action role-playing games
  - Nordic LARP
- fan studies and fandoms
- multimodal games with analog components
- game design
- games and learning

== Services and Platforms ==
=== Generation Analog ===
Starting in 2020, AGS organizes Generation Analog, an annual online tabletop games and education conference, co-presented with Game in Lab.

The talks are available on Analog Games Studies YouTube Channel: Analog Game Studies

=== Books ===
- Analog Game Studies (Vol. 1), edited by Emma Leigh Waldron, Evan Torner, and Aaron Trammell, Play Story Press, 2025, https://playstorypress.org/books/analog-game-studies-volume-1/.
- Analog Game Studies (Vol. 2), edited by Aaron Trammell, Emma Leigh Waldron, and Evan Torner, Play Story Press, 2025, https://playstorypress.org/books/analog-game-studies-volume-2/.
- Analog Game Studies (Vol.3), edited by Emma Leigh Waldron, Evan Torner, and Aaron Trammell, Play Story Press, 2025, https://playstorypress.org/books/analog-game-studies-volume-3/.
- Analog Game Studies (Vol. 4), edited by Evan Torner, Emma Leigh Waldron, & Shelly Jones, Play Story Press, 2025, https://playstorypress.org/books/analog-game-studies-volume-4/.
- Generation Analog 2021: Proceedings of the Tabletop Games and Education Conference, edited by Evan Torner, Shelly Jones, Edmond Chang, Megan Condis, and Aaron Trammell, Play Story Press, 2025, https://playstorypress.org/books/generation-analog-2021/.

== Other Games Studies Journals ==
- American Journal of Play, https://www.museumofplay.org/journalofplay/.
- Board Game Studies Journal (BGSJ), https://sciendo.com/journal/BGS.
- G|A|M|E: The Italian Journal of Game Studies, https://www.gamejournal.it/.
- Games and Culture, https://journals.sagepub.com/home/gac.
- International Journal of Role-Playing, https://journals.uu.se/IJRP.
- Japanese Journal of Analog Role-Playing Game Studies (JARPS), https://jarps.net/journal.
- Journal of Roleplaying Studies and STEAM (JRPSSTEAM), https://digitalcommons.njit.edu/jrpssteam/.
- Transformative Works and Cultures (TWC), https://journal.transformativeworks.org/index.php/twc.
