= Dogs in the Vineyard =

Tabletop role-playing game by Vincent Baker

- Cover art by Drew Baker
- Designers: D. Vincent Baker
- Publishers: Lumpley Games
- Publication: 2004 (1st edition)
- Genres: Alternate history, Western, indie (narrativist)
- Systems: Custom

Dogs in the Vineyard is an independently published role-playing game published by Lumpley Games in 2004 that is loosely based on the history of the Mormons.

== Setting ==
The game is set in "a West that never quite was"—loosely based on the Mormon State of Deseret in pre-statehood Utah. Players are "God's Watchdogs" ("Dogs"), who travel from town to town delivering mail, helping out the community and enforcing the judgments of the True Faith of the King of Life. This may involve anything from delivering new interpretations to the town's Steward to executing heretics. Dogs have absolute authority within the Faith, but not within the laws of the Territorial Authority, and so their actions can lead to conflict with the government in the East.

== System ==
The game features a form of conflict resolution in which die rolls are used in poker-style bids.

Characters' statistics and traits are represented by dice pools. At the start of a conflict, the Gamemaster and other players decide what is at stake, determine which pools are applicable, and those are rolled at that point. The character with the initiative puts forward a "raise" of two dice, while narrating a portion of the conflict which is beneficial to their character's position in the conflict. The opponent must respond by putting forward one or more dice whose total exceeds the total of the dice which were used to raise, or "give"—i.e. lose the conflict. If three or more dice are needed, the opponent suffers "fallout"—a negative outcome to be determined at the end of the conflict. If only one die is needed by the opponent, the attack has been "turned against the attacker" and the die can be reused to raise in the next round. The opponent now begins a round by putting forward two dice which the first character must match, and so on until one player or the other gives. Players may bring in new dice by "escalating" the conflict, from non-physical (discussion) to physical (running away) to brawling and then to gunfighting. If the conflict didn't start with non-physical, players may de-escalate from gunfighting to discussion, though it occurs only rarely. The GM's set of rules in conflict is very simple: "Roll dice or say yes". As game historian Stu Horvath translated: "If nothing is at stake, the GM should let the players succeed in their action in order to more quickly arrive at conflict that does require dice-rolling, which is where the stakes are and when events rapidly spiral out of control — the heart of the game."

During the "Town Creation" segment, the moral landscape of the town is laid out in the form of characters, their desires, and what they've done to each other which allows players to engage in the town without making wins or losses the only object of play.

== Publication history ==
Dogs in the Vineyard was written by D. Vincent Baker and published by Lumpley Games in 2004. Eventually Baker allowed the game to fall out of print due to his dissatisfaction with the setting and his belief that it promoted the history of colonization in the Americas. Baker indicated that he has considered a new edition or sequel that would extricate the system from the Mormon setting, but work has not begun.

In 2019, Baker gave tacit approval for KN Obaugh to publish a setting-free version of the game's system titled DOGS (the Dice pool and mOral predicament based Generic roleplaying System!)

== Reception ==
In his 2011 book Designers & Dragons, game historian Shannon Appelcline called this game "A story of God's Watchdogs, trying to preserve the faithful on the hostile frontier of the 19th century. This was one of the first indies to be notably successful, both financially and sociologically. It introduced the idea of 'say yes or roll', where GMs either went along with player suggestions, or gave them opportunity to occur through a die roll. Dogs was also notable for its revolutionary game design and for its existence as both an adventure story and a morality tale, all backed up by those mechanics. It truly captured the imagination of the indie field following its release."

Chase Carter for Polygon listed it as a "seminal" game of the late aughts "blooming of indie RPG designers", along with Apocalypse World, Fiasco, Lady Blackbird, and the Romance Trilogy.

In his 2023 book Monsters, Aliens, and Holes in the Ground, RPG historian Stu Horvath noted, "There is a strong tension between the system, the setting, the moral requirements of the gameplay, and the sensibilities of the players, which almost certainly clash with the dominant, conservative social standards of the setting. Those tensions naturally fuel the escalation of the narrative."

== Awards ==
- At the 2004 Indie RPG Awards, Dogs in the Vineyard won two awards: "Indie RPG of the Year" and "Most Innovative Game."
- In 2005 it was nominated for a Diana Jones Award for Excellence in Gaming.
