= Grey Ranks (role-playing game) =

Tabletop role-playing game

- Cover for 1st edition
- Designers: Jason Morningstar
- Publishers: Bully Pulpit Games
- Publication: 2007
- Genres: Indie
- Systems: custom

Grey Ranks is a role-playing game by Jason Morningstar, independently published by Bully Pulpit Games. The game is designed for three to five players and puts each of them in the shoes of child soldiers during the Warsaw Uprising, serving as members of the Grey Ranks (Polish: Szare Szeregi).

== Setting ==
Grey Ranks is set in the Warsaw Uprising in 1944, with each player playing a child aged between 15 and 17. The game itself takes place over the course of ten chapters, each relating to an event that shaped the course of the Warsaw Uprising. To set the scene, each chapter begins with someone reading out a passage attributed to Radio Lightning. This is a narrative conceit as the game starts with preparing for the uprising in July 1944, and Radio Lightning didn't start until a week into August.

The ten chapters are:

- Chapter One: Monkey-wrenching the Occupation - July 2, 1944
- Chapter Two: The Nazis Begin To Get Nervous - July 27, 1944
- Chapter Three: The Uprising Begins! - August 1, 1944
- Chapter Four: Desperate Street Fighting - August 2, 1944
- Chapter Five: The High Water Mark Of The Uprising - August 4, 1944
- Chapter Six: German Tanks against Home-Made Rifles - August 7, 1944
- Chapter Seven: Old Town Must Hold - August 14, 1944
- Chapter Eight: Old Town Falls and the Sewers Become A Highway - September 2, 1944
- Chapter Nine: The Soviets Reach the Vistula and Stop Cold - September 10, 1944
- Chapter Ten: Capitulation - October 3, 1944

The players have no ability within the game to change the overall course of the uprising.

== Game play ==
Grey Ranks is a collaborative role-playing game with no GM, and where each player has one scene for their character per chapter. Each scene in all chapters save the first and last needs resolving, and each chapter is harder to resolve than the previous ones. In order to play you need:

- 3-5 players
- A set of standard polyhedral dice ranging four sided to twelve sided. Ideally each player should have one of these.
- A copy of the grid, used to indicate the characters' mental and emotional health and well-being
- A copy of the Radio Lightning broadcasts
- A list of the districts in Warsaw in 1944 and brief descriptions of them
- Approximately one hour per chapter (commonly broken into three sessions)

Although not strictly necessary to play, the game book itself contains notes on Warsaw in the 1940s, guidance towards play, and other useful references.

=== Character creation ===
Before the game each player gives their character a name, a code name, an age, a sex, and a position on the grid. After the first chapter each player chooses something their character holds dear from their faith, their country, their city, their family, their friends, and their first love - and represents whichever they pick with a tangible symbol that may get destroyed in play. The other players then pick two negative reputations for the character that they may turn into positive reputations in play if they survive long enough. The reputations, and the things that characters hold dear may not overlap between player characters.

=== Play ===
At the start of each chapter the players pick a mission leader who decided what the mission will be. In the first chapter (the prologue) and the final chapter (the epilogue) the players collaboratively narrate scenes for the surviving characters. In subsequent chapters, the players each have one scene related to the mission for their character, and one personal scene for their character. Each player contributes one die to their personal scene, and one die each to the mission; in order to succeed the players must roll above the chapter number (2–9) multiplied by the number of players rolling. This means that it gets progressively harder to succeed as the game goes on, modelling the rise and fall of the Warsaw resistance. If a player fails but wishes to succeed (or even succeeds and wishes to fail) they may risk the thing they hold dear to re-roll any single die as a twelve sided dice (or as its previous value if they want to fail).

At the end of the chapter each character moves on the two-axis grid (love-hate and enthusiasm-exhaustion) based on whether they won or lost their personal mission and whether they won or lost. In each corner is a danger (martyrdom, nervous breakdown, derangement, suicidal depression) and any character that ends up in the same corner square twice is out of the game.

== Reception and awards ==
- Indy RPG Awards 2007 - Innovation in a Role Playing Game
- Indy RPG Awards 2007 - Independent Game of the Year
- Joint Winner Diana Jones Award 2008
