= My Life with Master =

Tabletop role-playing game by Paul Czege

- Cover of My Life with Master
- Designers: Paul Czege
- Publishers: Half Meme Press
- Publication: 2003
- Genres: Comic horror Indie
- Systems: custom

My Life with Master is an independently published role-playing game written by Paul Czege and published by Half Meme Press (it was first released at the 2003 Gen Con gaming convention). My Life with Master is a game about role-playing the servants or minions of an evil Master or Mistress. The game won several awards, and reviewers recognized it as well-written.

As of 2018, the game is only available as a PDF file download from the publisher.

== Gameplay ==
The prototypical setting of the role-playing game is in an unspecified Central European country in the early 19th century. Players in the game portray the Igor-like minions of an evil Master (or Mistress) who preys on the nearby Townsfolk.

Like most role-playing games, there is a Gamemaster (GM). In this case the GM plays the part of the Master. However, the GM and players together are supposed to "design" the Master, in terms of defining his "Wants", "Needs", "Aspect", and "Type". These traits have no explicit mechanical effect, but are used to define the desires and mannerisms of the Master and how he interacts with the Townsfolk and his minions. Masters have two game statistics, "Fear" (a measure of his power over minions) and "Reason" (how much minions and Townsfolk can resist the Master's control over them).

In contrast, the Master's minions, the characters portrayed by the players, are defined (in terms of game statistics) by their levels of "Weariness" and "Self-loathing", and the connections of "Love" that they have (successfully or unsuccessfully) tried to make with the Townsfolk. Self-loathing is a measure of the power that a minion has to intimidate the Townsfolk, while Weariness limits their abilities to complete their tasks. Love allows minions to resist their Master and his demands on them.

Gameplay is generally resolved through a series of "scenes". A player describes what their minion is trying to do, be it carrying out their Master's wishes or trying to resist him, interacting with the Townsfolk, attempting an act of Love (which could result in increasing their "Love" trait, or increasing their "Self-loathing" if the attempt fails), etc. A series of dice rolls are used to determine success or failure, and then the scene is played out according to that outcome.

Unlike other role-playing games that may have long campaigns, My Life with Master games are typically designed to end after a small number of playing sessions. As one reviewer stated, My Life with Master "strives to tell a story, and stories have endings." Usually, a game culminates with the death of the Master at the hands of one (or more) of his minions. Sometimes, the Master dies because the Townsfolk are "sick of his predations" and "storm his domicile -- pitchforks in hand and torches aflame". Some or all of the players' characters might also meet their end in the hands of the Townsfolk, or the Master kills them as they try to resist his commands and suffer the consequences of their failure.

== Critical reception ==
My Life with Master won the 2004 Diana Jones Award.

In addition, it also won the 2003 Out of the Box Award for Best Sui Generis RPG and the 2003 Indie Roleplaying Game of the Year.

Steve Darlington, in his review, stated that "even if you never play this game, you will be smarter simply for having read it" since "it quickly becomes hard to distinguish [Czege's] choice of attributes from a high-level academic deconstruction of the character tropes in gothic horror films at a level which could easily be found on a college reading list." He also said that it is "one of the very few horror games that may actually need disclaimers, and maybe even safe words too" for its "darker subtext" about escaping from abusive relationships.

According to Heather Barnhorst "Czege writes with wit and doesn't fear to let his understanding of game theory shine through. Colin Theriot's illustrations evoke exactly the right mood for the setting and are enjoyable as stand-alone art."

Reviewer Matthew Pook warned that "Despite the simplicity of the [game] mechanics ... they are not as clearly written as they need to be ... The GM will need to make a close read of the otherwise well-written text to help grasp how the outcome of a scene will alter a minion's statistics." He concluded his review stating "although not going to be everyone's cup of tea, My Life With Master is the most interesting roleplaying game released this year [2003] and perhaps the most challenging."

Game designer Greg Costikyan has praised My Life with Master for the way it "evokes emotions and feelings rare in games", and considers it to work in part because the Gothic horror theme has "a defined narrative arc: hubris and terror, followed by a fall".

== Reviews ==
- Backstab #49
