= Jason Morningstar =

American indie role-playing game designer

- Occupations: Game designer, game publisher
- Employer: Bully Pulpit Games
- Notable work: Fiasco
- Awards: Diana Jones Award, IndieCade

Jason Morningstar is an American indie role-playing game designer, publishing mostly through Bully Pulpit Games. Morningstar's games often forgo a game master and are set in situations that quickly take a turn for the worse for the player characters. Grey Ranks, for example, is about doomed child soldiers in the 1944 Warsaw Uprising, and Fiasco is about impulsive crooks pulling heists that are sure to go terribly wrong. With these two games, Morningstar became the only named person to have won the Diana Jones Award twice as of 2023. He also won an IndieCade Award for Desperation. In addition to designing games, Morningstar works with academia and industry, consulting on using games for teaching and learning in education, with a focus on health sciences.

== Games ==
Jason Morningstar's tabletop role-playing games tend to be GM-less and about events going badly. In addition to publishing multiple products with Bully Pulpit Games, he has also contributed to supplements for GURPS and Trail of Cthulhu, as well as a nano-game to Pelgrane Press' #Feminism anthology.

=== The Shab-al-Hiri Roach ===
The game is a GM-less black comedy lampooning academia, and designed for single-session play at the end of which a winner is determined. It is set among the internal politics of a buttoned-down New England college campus in 1919, with the titular roach being a soul-eating telepathic insect bent on destroying human civilization. Characters under the control of the roach succeed at tasks more easily, but can not win if they are still under the control of the roach at the game's end.

The game was originally released in the 2005 Game Chef competition, where it placed in the "Inner Circle." It was then published in 2006.

=== Drowning and Falling ===
Drowning and Falling is a game about dying by drowning and falling, and proceeds from the sale go to ORBIS International. It was published in 2006.

=== Grey Ranks ===
Grey Ranks is a GM-less game about child soldiers in the Warsaw Uprising of 1944. The game uses narrativist design to evoke the horrors of war. It was published in 2007 and won the 2008 Diana Jones award. Grey Ranks has been published in Italian and Polish.

=== Fiasco ===
Fiasco is a GM-less game for 3-5 players about a heist gone wrong. Its focus is on crooks with poor impulse control, inspired by movies such as Fargo. According to the Diana Jones Award committee, this game achieves a "dream" in roleplaying design: a satisfying storytelling experience played in a few hours with practically no preparation. Unlike his previous Grey Ranks, Fiasco is readily playable in a variety of settings. It was published in 2009 and won the 2011 Diana Jones award. Fiasco has been published in Italian, French, Spanish, Portuguese, Russian, Korean, and German.

=== Durance ===
Durance is a GM-less game for 3-5 players and designed to be played in the spirit of The Prisoner. It was entered into Game Chef in 2011, and published via Kickstarter in 2012. Durance has been published in Russian.

=== The Climb ===
The Climb is a game for six players about ascending a virgin peak in the Himalayas, and comes with a 91-minute soundtrack. It was published in 2013.

=== Night Witches ===
Night Witches is a game using the Powered by the Apocalypse engine about Soviet Airwomen in the 588th Night Bomber Regiment. Night Witches unites contemporary gender issues with World War II drama. It was successfully funded on Kickstarter in 2014 and delivered in early 2015.

=== Soul-Grinding Adventures in Top-Secret Science ===
Soul Grinding Adventures in Top-Secret Science is a short tabletop role-playing game published in the 2020 anthology The Ultimate Micro-RPG Book (Simon & Schuster).

=== Dungeon Squad ===
Dungeon Squad is a simple game is to provide a set of rules suitable for introducing teenagers to role-playing.

=== Desperation ===
Desperation is a boxed set of two survival horror tabletop role-playing games, Dead House and The Isabel. Both games are based on historical circumstances. Desperation won the 2023 IndieCade Tabletop Design Award.

== Writing about games ==
Jason Morningstar also writes about role-playing games.

=== Beyond the Game Master ===
The article Beyond the Game Master was published in the Solmukohta book of 2012, States of Play: Nordic Larp Around the World. Solmukohta is a conference where designers talk about Nordic Larp, a specific movement of live action role-playing games that originated in Nordic countries. The article Beyond the Game Master discusses various role-playing games without a gamemaster, including Lexicon, Breaking the Ice, Polaris, Archipelago II, Shock: Social Science Fiction, Geiger Counter, Fiasco, Kagematsu, Microscope, and various role-playing poems.

=== Visual Design as Metaphor ===
The article Visual Design as Metaphor: The Evolution of A Character Sheet talks about the design of the character sheet for Jason Morningstar's game Night Witches.

== Gaming community activities ==
Jason Morningstar organized and judged the Golden Cobra competition, publishing 49 new freeform games, many from new authors. Morningstar has been a Special Guest at Lucca Comics & Games and Dragoncon. He was one of the founding members of Camp Nerdly, an annual, family-friendly role-playing game convention at a campground in Virginia.
