= Polaris (2005 role-playing game) =

Tabletop collaborative role-playing game

Polaris: Chivalric Tragedy at Utmost North (2005) is an indie role-playing game written by Ben Lehman and published by These Are Our Games. Polaris is a collaborative roleplaying game, and as such differs from many role-playing games in that there is no single "game master". A player's "opposition" is controlled by the other players in the game.

The game participated in the Game Chef in 2004, an annual design competition for non-electronic games, challenging participants to write a playable draft of an original game in just over one week, based on a theme and a set of “ingredients". The 2004 ingredients were ice, island, dawn, assault, which ended up inspiring Polaris (arctic elves struggle against themselves and a demonic assault, with the dawn finally coming for the first time in hundreds of years).

Polaris won the Indie RPG Award for Innovation (2005) and Indie RPG Game of the Year Award (2005), was "Runner up" for Best Support (2005) and Best Production (2005), and was also "Runner Up" for the Outie Award Best Sui Generis RPG (2005).

An Italian language translation of the game was released by Janus Designs in 2009 and a Spanish one was scheduled for 2012.
