= Bully Pulpit Games =

Tabletop role-playing game publisher

Bully Pulpit Games LLC
- Industry: Role-playing game publisher
- Founded: 2005
- Headquarters: Chapel Hill, North Carolina, United States
- Products: Fiasco, Star Crossed
- Owner: Jason Morningstar and Steve Segedy
- Website: http://www.bullypulpitgames.com

Bully Pulpit Games, based in Chapel Hill, North Carolina, is a small publisher of indie role-playing games.

== History ==
Their games include Fiasco and Star Crossed.

The publisher is named for a phrase coined by Theodore Roosevelt. The site's logo includes a silhouette of the former President.

Bully Pulpit Games is a part of the Bits and Mortar initiative.

== Games ==
- Carolina Death Crawl
- Durance
- Fiasco - Winner, 2011 Diana Jones Award for Excellence in Gaming, Winner, Best Support, 2009 Indie RPG Awards
- The Shab-al-Hiri Roach
- The Fiasco Companion - Fiasco Companion – RPGgeek Golden Geek 2012 Best Supplement
- Grey Ranks - Joint Winner, 2008 Diana Jones Award for Excellence in Gaming, Winner, Innovation in a Role Playing Game and Independent Game of the Year, 2007 Indie RPG Awards
- Drowning and Falling
- The Warren
- Ghost Court
- Star Crossed - Winner, 2019 Diana Jones Award for Excellence in Gaming
