= Lady Blackbird (role-playing game) =

Science fantasy tabletop role-playing game

- Designers: John Harper
- Publication: 2009
- Genres: Tabletop role-playing game, science fantasy, romance

Lady Blackbird is a science fantasy tabletop role-playing game about space pirates by John Harper. It won two Indie RPG Awards in 2009.

== Gameplay ==
The game comes with a default adventure module, including a set of pre-generated player characters. In this adventure, Lady Blackbird has hired the player characters to smuggle her off an imperial planet in order to reunite with her pirate king lover. The game is typically played in one to three sessions.

== Reception ==
It won two Indie RPG Awards in 2009, for "Best Production" and "Best Free Game."

Chase Carter for Polygon listed Lady Blackbird as a "seminal" game of the late aughts "blooming of indie RPG designers", along with Dogs in the Vineyard, Apocalypse World, Fiasco, and the Romance Trilogy. Coleman Gailloreto for Screen Rant recommended it for beginners to tabletop role-playing games. Ashley Johnson for High Ground Gaming listed it as one of the ten best one-shot RPGs, praising its "adventure, romance, intrigue, and steampunk pirates."
