= Star Crossed (game) =

Tabletop role-playing game

- Designers: Alex Roberts
- Publishers: Bully Pulpit Games
- Publication: 2019
- Genres: tabletop role-playing game, romance
- Players: 2
- Chance: High
- Skills: role-playing, improvisation, manual dexterity
- Materials required: tumbling block tower

Star Crossed is a two-player tabletop role-playing game about forbidden romance by Alex Roberts published by Bully Pulpit Games in 2019. It won the 2019 Diana Jones Award.

== Gameplay ==
It uses a Jenga tower to build tension and determine story outcomes, inspired by the horror indie role-playing game Dread by Epidiah Ravachol.

== Reception ==
Charlie Hall for Polygon recommended Star Crossed for fan fiction "shippers" to play out their fantasy romances between characters in popular TV, movies and comics.

Beth Elderkin reviewed Star-Crossed in 2020 as part of a list of romantic tabletop role-playing games, saying that "It's a great way to build sexual tension with your partner, especially if it's someone you've been with for a long time. After all, there's no love quite like forbidden love."

Star Crossed won the 2019 Diana Jones Award.
