= Breaking the Ice (role-playing game) =

Tabletop role-playing game by Emily Care Boss

- Cover of Breaking the Ice
- Designers: Emily Care Boss
- Publishers: Black & Green Games
- Publication: 2005
- Genres: Romance
- Systems: Custom

Breaking the Ice is an indie role-playing game by Emily Care Boss. It's a game for two players where the player characters go on three dates together to see if they will become a couple.

== Setting ==
The setting and genre are created collaboratively by the two players before the game begins, and suggestions from the book are everything from modern romantic comedies to Romeo and Juliet. The characters are also created collaboratively, with the possibility to give suggestions for the other character's traits. An important part of character creation is the switch, where the players give their character an attribute from the other player. The switch could be gender, if the players are a man and a woman, an occupation if the players are working with different things in real life, or something else.

== Game system ==
Breaking the Ice is a two-player role playing game in which the players collaboratively describe the story of a romance between their characters.

The game uses pools of six-sided dice to determine the outcome of situations.

During dates one player is the active player and the other is the guide. The active player describes what happens during the date, and the guide can award bonus dice if the active player makes their character seem attractive or describes something true to life. After each scene the players roll the collected dice to see if their characters are attracted to each other, and then switch roles of active player and guide. If the active player describes something that puts their character at disadvantage, the guide can grant them re-roll dice.

After three dates the players get to decide, in part based on their characters' mutual attraction score, if the characters will stay together.

== Publication history ==
The game was released in the summer of 2005 by Emily Care Boss through the solely owned Black & Green Games.

== Reception ==
Guillaume Clerc and Vincent Carleur reviewed Breaking the Ice as part of the article "Jeux Narrativistes: La sélection du bimestre" in Casus Belli (v4, Issue 12 - Nov/Dec 2014, pages 82-83, in French) and felt that traditional role-players would be wrong to be skeptical of this game, and that the players get attached to the characters very quickly.

Breaking the Ice was a runner-up for Indie Game of the Year, Most Innovative Game of the Year, and Best Support, at the 2005 Indie RPG Awards.

Chase Carter for Polygon listed Emily Care Boss's Romance Trilogy (of which Breaking the Ice is a part) as a "seminal" game of the late aughts "blooming of indie RPG designers", along with Dogs in the Vineyard, Apocalypse World, Fiasco, and Lady Blackbird.

== Reviews ==
- Pyramid
