= Fiasco (role-playing game) =

Tabletop role-playing game by Jason Morningstar

- Cover for 1st edition
- Designers: Jason Morningstar
- Publishers: Bully Pulpit Games
- Publication: 2009
- Genres: Indie
- Systems: custom

Fiasco is a role-playing game by Jason Morningstar, independently published by Bully Pulpit Games. It is marketed as a "GM-less game for 3–5 players, designed to be played in a few hours with six-sided dice and no preparation". It is billed as "A game of powerful ambition and poor impulse control" and "inspired by cinematic tales of small time capers gone disastrously wrong—films like Blood Simple, Fargo, The Way of the Gun, Burn After Reading, and A Simple Plan."

Fiasco was the winner of the eleventh Diana Jones Award and has been one of the featured games on Tabletop.

== Setting/playsets ==
Fiasco is designed to simulate the caper-gone-wrong subgenre of film. It shares creative control of the story among the players, even when determining who each player's character is. Themes of the game include black comedy, and poor impulse control.

Although there is no one standard setting, each game of Fiasco uses a "playset" that indicates the setting of that specific game. The core rulebook contains playsets for Main Street (small town America), Boomtown (The Wild West), Tales from Suburbia, and The Ice (McMurdo Station, Antarctica). Bully Pulpit Games also released a free Playset of the Month on their website. These, and many more, are available for free online on the Bully Pulpit Games website, with many fan-made playsets available online, as well. The Fiasco Companion provides additional advice on creating playsets.

Each playset consists of a basic description of the setting and:

- six groups of six relationships between two characters in the setting
- six groups of six needs to be shared by two of the characters
- six groups of six notable objects
- six groups of six notable locations

Each group and each element within that group is numbered from one to six.

== Gameplay ==
Fiasco is a role-playing game with no GM, the game being set up before the action starts. The game is for three to five players, and takes between one and three hours, including two acts and an aftermath. The things required to play are:

- four ordinary (six sided) dice per player of two different colors
- a Fiasco Playset
- a copy of the Fiasco Tilt Table and the Fiasco Aftermath Table
- pen and paper

=== Set-up ===
The players first select the playset and roll dice (four per player—two light, two dark). The players then go around the table, taking turns to choose a die. Using the value of the dice, the player selects a group, or an element of a previously selected group, from a list provided by the playset to establish relationships (one for each adjacent player), needs, objects, and locations. Each pair of adjacent players has a defined relationship and one other element (a need, object, or location) that is central to the relationship. After all dice have been used, they are all returned to a central pool to be used as the game progresses.

After all dice values have been used, each player will share with each neighbor:

- One relationship
- One need, object, or location

The players then discuss who their characters are, what they are called, and how they relate to each other, and the objects, needs, and locations their characters share. Once this is decided Act One is ready to begin.

=== Act One ===
In Act One, for each player's turn, she or he may choose either to Establish or to Resolve.

Should the player choose to Establish, the content of the scene—people, place, conflict—is determined by the player. Doing this allows the player to set up the scene as they wish. However, the resolution of the scene or conflict is determined by the other players, who will choose a light die (a good resolution) or a dark die (a bad resolution) to give to the player in the middle of the scene. The player must accept the resolution, acting out or narrating events accordingly.

Alternatively, should the player choose to Resolve, the other players dictate the circumstances of the scene: the characters with whom the player's character will interact, where it happens, and what the conflict within the scene is. Choosing this option gives the player control of the resolution, unlike the Establish option.

In Act One, at the conclusion of a player's scene, she or he selects another player and gives that person the Resolution die. After each player has had two scenes, half the dice are exhausted and Act One ends.

=== The Tilt and Act Two ===
Between Act One and Act Two is the "Tilt"—the incident that is the heart of the story. To determine who selects the Tilt elements, all players roll their dice (if they have any). Same-colored die values are added together and the lower total is subtracted from the greater. The player with the highest total for dark dice and the player with highest total for light dice then roll all unassigned dice. As when setting up the game, these two players each select one group (such as "Tragedy" or "Failure") on the Tilt Table using the values from the rolled, unassigned dice. Using the remaining die values, the two players choose an element from the other's chosen group ("Death, out of the blue" or "A tiny mistake leads to ruin"), thus establishing the "tilt" element of the story.

After the Tilt has been established, Act Two progresses in the same way as Act One, with each player deciding whether to Establish or Resolve scenes in the same order as Act One. Typically, the selected Tilt elements will come into play immediately, but this is not always the case. In some games, the Tilt elements will not show up until the climax of the story, where they will alter the fates of the characters. Also, along with the new Tilt elements introduced, the biggest difference in Act Two is that instead of giving away the Resolution die, the player keeps it. If there were mostly positive resolutions in Act One, there will, by necessity, be mostly negative resolutions in Act Two.

=== The Aftermath ===
After all the dice are exhausted—each player having had four scenes—everyone rolls the dice they have collected, just like when determining who chooses the Tilt element, and consults the Aftermath table to determine whether their characters has a positive or negative outcome, is dead, or is "worse than dead".

Finally, after a player figures out her or his character's fate, the Aftermath is played out. Going around the table, each player takes a turn to narrate a short scene, formed into a montage, for their character until all players run out of dice. At that point, the game is finished.

== Publication history ==
Fiasco started as a game designed by Jason Morningstar called Hat Creek, about the life and death of a town in the American West, with the relationships created as a part of that game becoming the eventual basis for Fiasco. The game itself took 14 months to playtest, and used over 70 playtesters in 13 groups. In November 2008, Morningstar asked for interested playtesters on the story-games forum, and Fiasco was published by Bully Pulpit Games in December 2009. A second edition, Fiasco 2E, was published in 2021.

== Reception ==
Quintin Smith, writing for Eurogamer, called it "the funniest game I've ever played." Smith pointed out, "The white dice always set terrible wheels in motion and the black dice ensure those wheels fall off. Every. Single. Time. But mostly, the dice system works because when you're suddenly ordered to make a scene end 'well' or 'badly', the result is always entertaining." Smith concluded, "Everyone should try Fiasco. With a lot of board games, you might try them once then feel a quiet guilt that you haven't squeezed more evenings out of them. Not so with indie RPGs. At just $12 for the Fiasco .pdf, you'll be able to buy it, try it and see what you think of one of the most exciting developments in gaming - and feel good doing it. Go on! Make a mess. I dare you."

Alex Meehan, writing for Dicebreaker, named Fiasco one of the best tabletop role-playing games to play in 2024.

Chase Carter for Polygon listed it as a "seminal" game of the late aughts "blooming of indie RPG designers", along with Apocalypse World, Lady Blackbird, Dogs in the Vineyard and the Romance Trilogy.

In Wired, N.J. Harnish commented, "Fiasco is hands down one of the best RPGs I have ever played. ... if you despise collaborative gaming experiences and want very traditional RPG mechanics, Fiasco is going to be a poor fit" and noted that "Fiasco can easily venture in to areas that may make certain players uncomfortable and so it's important for people, especially those unfamiliar with each other, to discuss potential limits and taboo subjects before the start of any game."

James Dominguez, writing in the Sydney Morning Herald, noted that "Clearly, this is not a game for everyone. Players with some experience in improvisation, storytelling, or theatre would get the most enjoyment from it, but many people who have never tried acting or writing before could still have a lot of fun."

In his 2023 book Monsters, Aliens, and Holes in the Ground, RPG historian Stu Horvath noted, "As with other storytelling games, it has some points that can be intimidating, particularly the cold open at the beginning, which feels exactly like eyeing up a cold pool to jump into on a hot day — the refreshment comes only after the initial shock — and implementations of the Tilt, which can sometimes feel artificially mechanical." Horvath concluded, "It's the best sort of RPG — one where the only limits are one's imagination (and, perhaps, one's appetite for comedic cruelty.)"

== Awards ==
- At the 2009 Indie RPG Awards, Fiasco won in the category "Best Support", and was runner-up in three other categories: "Best Production", "Most Innovative Game", and "Game of the Year".
- At the 2010 Golden Geek Awards, it was a finalist for "RPG of the Year".
- At the 2010 Origins Awards, Fiasco was a finalist for "Best Roleplaying Game".
- In 2011, Fiasco won the Diana Jones Award for Excellence in Gaming.
- At the 2021 ENNIE Awards, Fiasco 2E was a finalist for "Best Rules".

== The Fiasco Companion ==
The Fiasco Companion is the first supplement for Fiasco. It contains advice for playing and hacking Fiasco and contains four playsets and alternative tilt and aftermath tables. It also contains notes and reflections from players of Fiasco including Wil Wheaton and John Rogers.

The Fiasco Companion has won the following awards:

- 2011 Indie RPG Awards Supplement of the Year
- 2011 Indie RPG Awards Best Support
- 2012 Golden Geek Best Supplement

== Card-based edition ==
In August 2019, Bully Pulpit Games introduced a card-based version of the game, which they launched on Kickstarter. Instead of dice and index cards, the boxed version uses decks of playing cards for playsets and an engine deck.
