= Renga (video game) =

2012 video game

- Developer: wallFour
- Publisher: wallFour
- Release: 2012
- Genre: Shoot 'em up
- Mode: Multiplayer

Renga is a shoot 'em up video game developed and published by British studio wallFour. Designed for movie theaters for up to one hundred players, players are given laser pointers and are tasked with cooperatively building and defending a space ship. It was showcased at 2012's Indiecade, where it won the Developers Choice Award.

== Gameplay ==
Renga is a "theatrical co-op" game. It is designed to be played in a movie theater with up to one hundred players, with each player holding a laser pointer. Players must pilot a space ship by hitting one of four arrows, which causes the ship to move. At the same time, players must also defend the ship from objects such as pentagons and hexagons. Defeating a pentagon, for example, requires five players to hit the five points of the shape simultaneously in order to destroy it. Destroying the hexagons earns the players blocks, which can be used to build engines or silos, the latter of which can capture more blocks.

== Development and release ==
Renga was created by wallFour, former video game industry employees Adam Russell, previously of Lionhead Studios and John Sear, previously of Codemasters. The inspiration for the game came from works of ProjectorGames and Graffiti Research Lab's L.A.S.E.R. Tag.

Renga was selected as one of thirty-six finalists at Indiecade in 2012. It was later featured at Indiecade East in 2013 at the Museum of the Moving Image. It was also shown at the Game Developers Conference, SXSW, New York Film Festival and the GameCity Festival.

== Reception ==
At 2012's Indiecade, Renga was awarded the Developers Choice Award. It also received an honorable mention for the Nuovo Award at 2013's Independent Games Festival.

Luke Larsen from Paste placed it first on his list of "Exciting Games from IndieCade 2012", saying that "it was the one game that had us most convinced of the communal power of video games."

John Walker from Rock, Paper, Shotgun considered the concept of the game to be "splendid".
