= Intercon LARP conventions =

New England (US) LARP convention

Intercon
- Status: Active
- Genre: LARP
- Venue: Crowne Plaza Warwick
- Location: Warwick, Rhode Island
- Country: United States
- Inaugurated: 1986
- Organizer: New England Interactive Literature
- Filing status: Non-profit
- Website: www.interconlarp.org

The Intercon LARP conventions are a series of live action role-playing (LARP) conventions licensed by LARPA and produced by independent groups. The conventions began with the SiliCon LARP convention, organized in 1986. To be licensed by LARPA Intercons must support some sort of open bid process in which local groups or individuals, regardless of affiliation, are invited to submit LARP events, and evaluated by some reasonably fair process.

The Intercon Conventions have used the names Silicon, and Intercon. They have been, over the years, a core element of the growth of Theatre Style LARP in the northeastern United States, primarily in the Boston and Washington DC areas. Currently InterCon is held in Warwick, Rhode Island.

Recent Intercons have run for four days over a weekend starting on Thursday afternoon, and ending Sunday evening. Most LARPs at Intercon run for 4 hours, and are typically offered in morning, afternoon, and evening slots. Intercon hosts LARPs of various styles and genres.

== Events ==
Convention Name	Location	Date	# of LARPs
SiLicon I	Woburn, Massachusetts	Mar. 1986	
SiLicon II	Danvers, Massachusetts	Mar. 1987	
SiLicon 2.5 (Unofficial event)	New Jersey	Nov. 1987	
SiLicon III	Danvers, Massachusetts	Mar. 1988	
SiLicon 3.5 (Unofficial event)	Morristown, New Jersey	Oct. 1988	
SiLicon IV	Philadelphia, Pennsylvania	Apr. 1989	
SiLicon V	New Haven, Connecticut	Apr. 1990	
SiLicon VI	Annapolis, Maryland	Mar. 1991	
Intercon VII	Edison, New Jersey	Mar. 1992	
Intercon 7.5		Dec. 1992	
Intercon VIII	Hunt Valley, Maryland	Mar. 1993	
Intercon IX		Mar. 1994	
Intercon 9.5	Hunt Valley, Maryland	Oct. 1994	
Intercon X	Ocean City, Maryland	Mar. 1995	
Intercon 10.5	Timonium, Maryland	Oct. 1995	
Intercon XI	Timonium, Maryland	Mar. 1996	
Intercon 11.5	Mt. Laurel, New Jersey	Oct. 1996	
Intercon XII	Hunt Valley, Maryland	Mar. 1997	
Intercon 12.5	Edison, New Jersey	Oct. 1997	
Intercon XIII	Natick, Massachusetts	Mar. 1998	
Intercon 13.5	Timonium, Maryland	Oct. 1998	
Intercon XIV	Natick, Massachusetts	Mar. 1999	
Intercon 14.5	Cherry Hill, New Jersey	Jul. 1999	
Intercon Millennium	Timonium, Maryland	Dec. 1999 - Jan. 2000	
Intercon XV	Chelmsford, Massachusetts	Mar. 2000	
Intercon 15.5	Timonium, Maryland	Jun. - Jul. 2000	
Intercon A	Chelmsford, Massachusetts	Mar. 2001	
Intercon XVI	Timonium, Maryland	Oct. 2001	
Intercon B	Chelmsford, Massachusetts	Mar. 2002	
Intercon XVII	Timonium, Maryland	Oct. 2002	
Intercon C	Chelmsford, Massachusetts	Feb. - Mar. 2003	
Intercon Gazebo (Intercon XVIII)	Piscataway, New Jersey	Jul. 2003	
Intercon D	Chelmsford, Massachusetts	Mar. 2004	37
Intercon Mid-Atlantic 2004	Timonium, Maryland	Oct. 2004	
Intercon E	Chelmsford, Massachusetts	Mar. 2005	45
Intercon Mid-Atlantic 2005 (Intercon XX)	New Castle, Delaware	Oct. 2005	
Intercon F	Chelmsford, Massachusetts	Mar. 2006	34
Intercon Mid-Atlantic 2006 (Intercon XXI)	Rehoboth, Delaware	Nov. 2006	
Intercon G	Chelmsford, Massachusetts	Mar. 2007	37
Intercon Mid-Atlantic 2007 (Intercon XXII)	Rehoboth, Delaware	Nov. 2007	
Intercon H	Chelmsford, Massachusetts	Feb. - Mar. 2008	44
Intercon Mid-Atlantic 2008 (Intercon XXIII)	Rehoboth, Delaware	Nov. 2008	
Intercon I	Chelmsford, Massachusetts	Mar. 2009	49
Intercon Mid-Atlantic 2009 (Intercon XXIV)	Germantown, Maryland	Oct. 2009	
Intercon J	Chelmsford, Massachusetts	Mar. 2010	51
Intercon K	Waltham, Massachusetts	Mar. 2011	52
Intercon Mid-Atlantic 2011	Bethesda, Maryland	Sep. 2011	
Intercon L	Chelmsford, Massachusetts	Mar. 2012	54
Intercon M	Chelmsford, Massachusetts	Mar. 2013	83
Intercon N	Chelmsford, Massachusetts	Feb. - Mar. 2014	86
Intercon O	Chelmsford, Massachusetts	Feb. - Mar. 2015	91
Intercon P	Westborough, Massachusetts	Feb. 2016	88
Intercon Q	Warwick, Rhode Island	Feb. 2017	96
Intercon R	Warwick, Rhode Island	Feb. 2018	118
Intercon S	Warwick, Rhode Island	Feb. 2019	127
Intercon T	Warwick, Rhode Island	Feb - Mar. 2020	133
Intercon U	Warwick, Rhode Island	Mar. 2023	128
Intercon V	Warwick, Rhode Island	Feb - Mar. 2024	151
Intercon W	Warwick, Rhode Island	Feb - Mar. 2025	160
Intercon X	Warwick, Rhode Island	Feb - Mar. 2026	188
Intercon Y	Warwick, Rhode Island	Feb. 2027	

== Connections to Other Conventions ==
- New England Interactive Literature (NEIL), who has run all Intercons since 2012, also runs the New England LARP Conference and Little BofferCon. Both are held in Massachusetts. NEIL also hosts the Larp Library and publishes Game Wrap - a LARP focused periodical.
- In 2013 the Wyrd Con Companion Book 2012 was launched at Intercon M.
