= Paul Czege =

Game designer

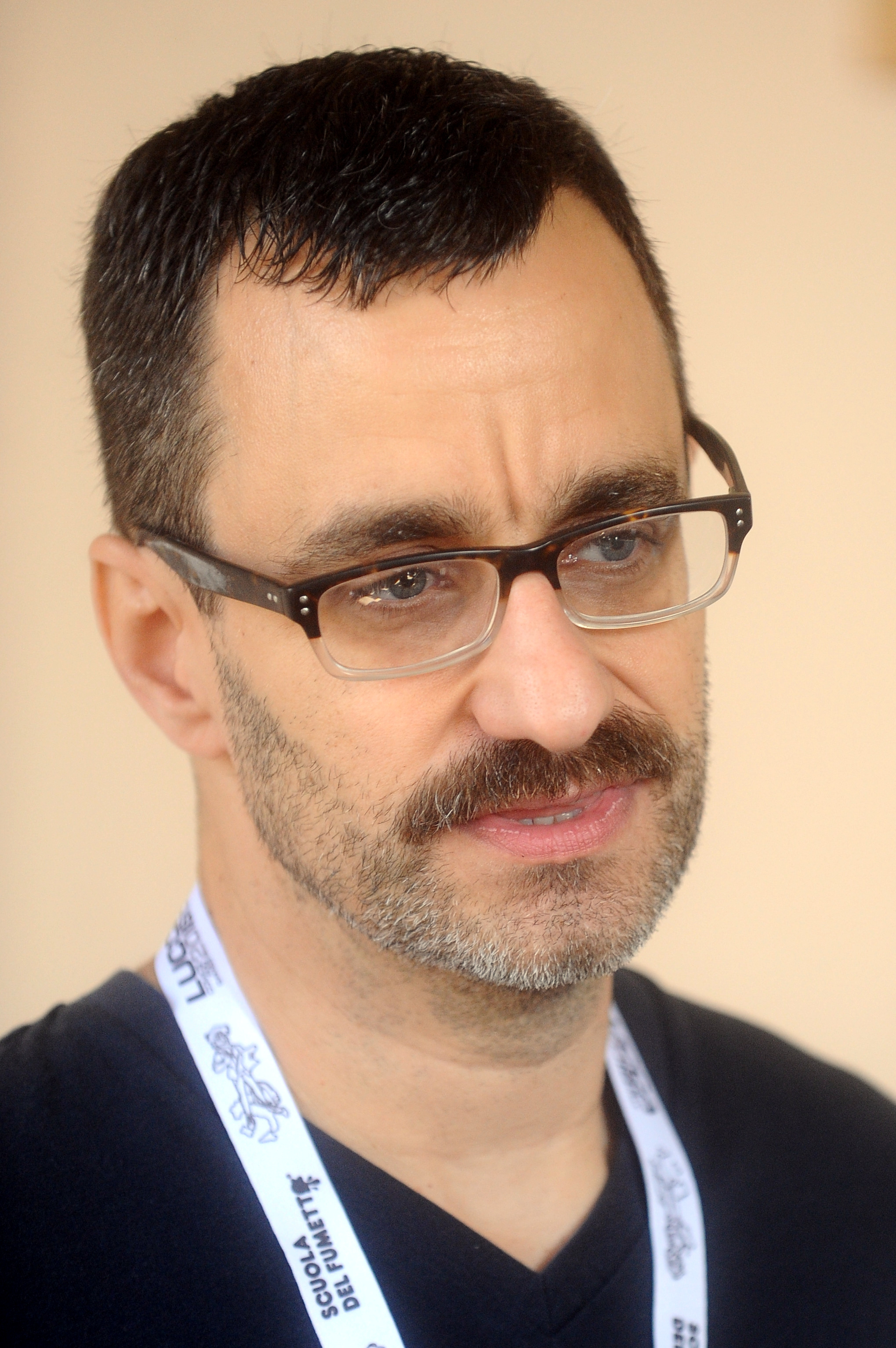
Paul Czege at Lucca Comics & Games 2018

Paul Czege is a designer of tabletop role-playing games. Czege was a member of The Forge and later became a publisher of indie role-playing games. He has won the Diana Jones Award and several Indie RPG Awards.

== Awards ==
Nicotine Girls won "Best Free Game" at the 2002 Indie RPG Awards.

My Life With Master was the third role-playing game to win the Diana Jones Award. It also won the "Indie Game of the Year" award at the 2003 Indie RPG Awards and the 2003 Out of the Box Award for "Best Sui Generis RPG."

The Clay That Woke won two Indie RPG Awards in 2014, for "Indie Game of the Year" and "Most Innovative Game."

== Games ==
- The World, the Flesh, and the Devil
- Nicotine Girls
- My Life with Master
- The Valedictorian’s Death
- Bacchanal
- Specimen for the Resurrection
- Acts of Evil (released incomplete)
- The Niche Engine
- Honeydew
- Thy Vernal Chieftains
- The Clay that Woke
