= Role-playing game terms =

Words used in a specific sense in the context of role-playing games

Role-playing games (RPGs) have developed specialized terminology. This includes both terminology used within RPGs to describe in-game concepts and terminology used to describe RPGs. Role-playing games also have specialized slang and jargon associated with them.

Besides the terms listed here, there are numerous terms used in the context of specific, individual RPGs such as Dungeons & Dragons (D&D), Pathfinder, Fate, and Vampire: The Masquerade. For a list of RPGs, see List of role-playing games.

== Terms used to play role-playing games ==
=== A ===
- Adventure: A set of game sessions united by characters and by narrative sequence, setting or goal.
- Armor Class (or AC): The difficulty to hit a specified target, abstracted from its dodging capacity and armor. "This term was inherited from a naval battle game". Many role-playing games that came after Dungeons & Dragons have "abandoned the notion of defining defense as armor class".
- Area of Effect (or AoE): An effect that affects a zone, measured by a template, distance in hexagon or ordinary metrics.

=== B ===
- Buff: A statistical boost which offers some form of advantage, usually to a character.

=== C ===
- Campaign: A series of adventures.
- Character: player character: non-player character or game-master character: a fictional character in a role-playing game.
- Character class is an occupation, profession, or role assigned to a game character to highlight and differentiate their abilities and specializations.
- Character sheet: A record of a player character in a role-playing game, including whatever details, notes, game statistics, and background information a player would need during a play session.
- Character creation: The method used to create a player character.
- Critical: (dice) result (- hit / - failure) with lower probability (natural 1 or 20 on an icosahedron, matched dice, etc.) resulting in a strong fictional/mechanical outcome.

=== D ===
- Difficulty Class (or DC): A target number to succeed in a task.
- Dungeon: An enclosed location that contains hostile NPCs, such as a cave or building. A dungeon crawl is a type of scenario in which players navigate a labyrinth type of dungeon, battling various monsters, avoiding traps, solving puzzles, and looting any treasure they may find.

=== F ===
- Fumble: Critical failure. syn. Botch.

=== G ===
- Game master (or GM). The person who runs a role-playing game and arbitrates how actions are resolved and narrated. In many games, specialized terms are used, as such Dungeon Master for the person running Dungeons & Dragons, Storyteller for the person running a game set in the World of Darkness or Referee for the person running Traveller.
- Gamemaster's screen: a folding screen, often of cardboard, used to hide adventure content from the players.

=== H ===
- Hexcrawl: A type of scenario in which the players explore and travel through an environment by moving on a map that is broken up into hexagon-shaped sub-sections known as hexes, each of which contains some kind of terrain and possibly encounters or other points of interest and landmarks like towns or dungeons.

=== I ===
- Initiative : The determination of who goes first and in what order declared actions are carried out.

=== M ===
- Metagaming: A player's use of out-of-character knowledge concerning the state of the game to determine their character's actions, when said character has no relevant knowledge or awareness under the circumstances.
- Modifier: A number added to or subtracted from a die roll based on a specific skill or other attribute.

=== N ===
- Natural (roll): The number actually on a die, such as a natural 1 or a natural 20, indicating the die's face shows a 1 or a 20, as opposed to the number rolled plus modifiers.

=== S ===
- Saving throw: A game mechanic in which dice are used to avoid some kind of negative effect on a character.
- Safety tools: An auxiliary ruleset added to a roleplaying game that establishes boundaries, trigger warnings, and communication methods. Examples of popular safety toolsets include: Lines and Veils by Emily Care Boss (based on concepts from Sex & Sorcery by Ron Edwards), Script Change by Beau Sheldon, and the X-Card by John Stavropoulos.
- Session: A single meeting of a role-playing group.
- Session Zero (or Session 0): The first game session where the game master and players determine the playstyle, mechanics and themes they will use as group in their game. Groups will also determine the expectations and limitations (including use of safety tools) of their game. Some groups also use this session to create characters and establish other parts of worldbuilding for their game.
- Setting: The fictional world in which the game takes place.
- Story guide: Also, "storyteller." The game master of a game with a strong focus on narrative tropes.
- System: The set of game mechanics which make up a game.

=== T ===
- THAC0 (which stands for "To hit armor class zero"): In D&D 2E (Dungeons and Dragons second edition), the number needed on a dice roll for a character to hit an NPC if they have a zero armor class.
- Total party kill (TPK) or total party wipe(out) (TPW): The entire party of player characters dies.
- Troupe system: A style of play in which different characters are run by the same player in different sessions; in some cases, the duties of the game master may also be rotated amongst the players.

== Terms used to describe characters ==
=== A ===
- Advantage: A positive or useful statistic or trait.
- Attributes: Natural, in-born characteristics shared by all characters. Functional attributes, such as physical strength or wisdom, have a mechanical impact on gameplay while cosmetic attributes, such as visual appearance, allow a player to define their character within the game.

=== D ===
- Derived statistic: A secondary characteristic based on a character's attributes (or primary characteristics), which may include such fluctuating measures as hit points or magic points.

=== P ===
- Powers: Extraordinary abilities which make a character special, such as flight or telepathy.

=== R ===
- Race: Any sapient species or beings that make up the setting. Players can often choose to be one of these creatures when creating their character and each possess different abilities and attributes that distinguish them from one another. Races can also possess their own ethnicities, types, or other description of their physical and cultural heredity. Role-playing games often include fantasy races, mutants, robots and other non-human character types.

=== S ===
- Skills: Learned capabilities, such as spoken languages, horse riding or computer hacking.
- Statistic: Any attribute, advantage, disadvantage, power, skill, or other trait. In the plural, statistics refers to the information on a character sheet. Often abbreviated as "stats".

== Terms used to describe types of games ==
=== A ===
- Actual play (or live play): A genre of podcast or web show in which people play tabletop role-playing games (TTRPGs) for an audience. Actual play often encompasses in-character interactions between players, storytelling from the gamemaster, and out-of-character engagements such as dice rolls and discussion of game mechanics.

=== F ===
- Free-form role-playing game: A rules-light style of game that mostly uses social dynamics for its game system.

=== G ===
- Gamist: A term from GNS theory describing games in which enjoyment is derived from facing and overcoming challenges.
- Generic: A system that can support a wide variety of settings.
- Genre: A game that adheres to certain fictional tropes, such as fantasy or science fiction.

=== K ===
- Keepsake: A type of role-playing game where the player(s) create a physical keepsake, such as a journal, in response to prompts or other game mechanics over the course of playing the game. Game designers Shing Yin Khor and Jeeyon Shim are credited for coining this style game as "keepsake". This type of game has been compared to legacy board games where the game itself is permanently changed by playing the game.

=== L ===
- Live-action (or LARP): A type of role-playing game physically enacted in a troupe acting style.
- Living campaigns (or shared campaigns): A gaming format within the table-top role-playing game community that provides the opportunity for play by an extended community within a shared universe.

=== N ===
- Narrativist: A term from GNS theory describing games in which enjoyment is derived from creating a good story.

=== O ===
- Online RPG: A type of computer game that uses RPG-style game mechanics and tropes.

=== R ===
- Rules-heavy: A game system with heavily codified mechanics, usually encompassing a wide variety of possible actions in a game. The opposite of rules-lite.
- Rules-lite: A game system that uses very general mechanics, usually more focused on narrative actions in a game. The opposite of rules-heavy.

=== S ===
- Simulationist: A term from GNS theory for games in which enjoyment is derived from deep immersion in a new (simulated) world.
- Solo role-playing game: A type of role-playing game that can be played by a single person, without the participation of other players or a gamemaster.

=== W ===
- West Marches: A campaign format designed to accommodate a larger group of players in a drop-in drop-out style where each game session may feature a different assortment of players and game masters in a shared world. The format features an open sandbox style of narrative where players go out into the world to explore and pick which storylines to engage with. Polygon noted that the style was created by the Microscope (2011) game designer Ben Robbins. It started with a "similar premise" to the module The Keep on the Borderlands (1979) where players begin each game session in a safe "fortified town" near "the edge of civilization, and beyond that extends a wilderness ripe with dangers and opportunities for adventurers"; players then head out to "explore the wilderness with no prompts, quests, or input from the Game Master" and return to town at the end of each session. Robbins explained that his motivation in establishing the West Marches style was "to overcome player apathy and mindless 'plot following' by putting the players in charge of both scheduling and what they did in-game. A secondary goal was to make the schedule adapt to the complex lives of adults. Ad hoc scheduling and a flexible roster meant (ideally) people got to play when they could but didn't hold up the game for everyone else if they couldn't".

== Terms used by gamers ==
=== B ===
- Bleed: A term that describes both the positive and negative emotional carry over a player can potentially feel due to the role-playing experiences of their characters. Players can also bring real-life emotions into their role-playing games. "This process has been named bleed by game designer and scholar Emily Care Boss, because emotions from one environment bleed into another".
- Blue booking: One or a few of the players describing activities of their characters in written form, outside of the role-playing session, creating a sort of ongoing character history and resolving actions that do not involve the rest of the group.

=== C ===
- Crunch: The rules and mechanics of a game.

=== F ===
- Fluff: Flavor text; the setting and ambiance of a game, particularly in reference to written descriptive material. Distinct from the rules/mechanics.

=== M ===
- Monty haul: A pun on Monty Hall (the former host of Let's Make A Deal), when equipment, abilities, and other rewards are awarded more often than the system intends (or in some cases more often than the system is capable of handling).
- Munchkin: An immature player, especially one who is selfishly focused on dominating play, often by seeking to circumvent the normal limitations placed on characters.

=== P ===
- Powergamer: A player focused on system mastery; a min-maxer.

=== R ===
- Rule as Intended (or RAI): The rules with the context of the designers' intent.
- Rule as Written (or RAW): The rules "without regard to the designers' intent. The text is forced to stand on its own". Game designer Jeremy Crawford wrote, "In a perfect world, RAW and RAI align perfectly, but sometimes the words on the page don't succeed at communicating the designers' intent. Or perhaps the words succeed with one group of players but fail with another".
- Roll-playing: A derisive term for rules-heavy games, occasionally to the point of requiring players to focus on game mechanics at the expense of role-playing.
- Rules lawyer: A player who strictly adheres to the rules as written, and enforces them among all other players.

=== T ===
- Twink: A player who engages in system mastery with an explicit focus of exploiting powerful abilities. Similar to powergamer.
