= Game Chef =

Tabletop role-playing game design contest

Game Chef was an annual American contest for role-playing game designers.

== History ==
Jason Morningstar submitted The Shab-al-Hiri Roach to the Game Chef 2005 competition, where it was chosen as one of the "Inner Circle" - the group of the nine best games from that year's 28 entrants.

Morningstar also wrote Durance for the Game Chef 2011 competition.

With time it evolved into a marketing event which created "national" editions, where small groups of players (generally connected to publishing micro-companies) assigned prizes to friends or game companies for which they worked. Game Chef ended in 2020 due to the low interest demonstrated by the RPG community. Trials to revive it were unsuccessful for the same reason.
