= Diana Jones Award =

Annual award for excellence in tabletop gaming

- The original, now lost, Award
- Awarded for: Excellence in gaming
- Presented by: Diana Jones committee
- First award: 2001
- Website: http://www.dianajonesaward.org/

The Diana Jones Award is an annual award for "excellence in gaming". The original award was made from a burned book encased in lucite. The award is unusual in two ways: first, it is not an award for a specific class of thing, but can be awarded to a person, product, publication, company, organization, event or trend – anything related to gaming; second, it does not count popularity or commercial success as a sign of "excellence". The award was first presented in 2001.

Nominees are circulated during the year to the committee, which is mostly anonymous but which is known to include Peter Adkison, Matt Forbeck, John Kovalic and James Wallis. The committee is anonymous to protect the voting process from interference, but individual judges are free to reveal themselves. The committee releases a shortlist of three to seven nominees in spring, and the award is presented to the winner at Gen Con in Indianapolis in August.

== History ==
The Diana Jones trophy was originally created as a keepsake in the UK offices of TSR in the mid 1980s to commemorate the ending of their license to publish The Adventures of Indiana Jones Role-Playing Game. The trophy itself was a lucite pyramid containing the burnt remains of the last unsold copy of the game; all that was legible of the title was "diana Jones". The trophy was "liberated" and eventually ended up with the Diana Jones committee. The destruction of "one of the least-loved and critically savaged games of all time" was seen an appropriate symbol for an award for excellence in gaming. The trophy also contains a counter that reads "Nazi™" from the game. While the trademark claim was present at Lucasfilm's insistence, it led to rumors that TSR had tried to trademark the term.

In October 2021, it was announced that the physical award had been lost in transit. A committee member stated "Perhaps it now sits in a box inside a warehouse somewhere, as forgotten and unappreciated as the Ark of the Covenant at the end of Raiders of the Lost Ark." A new physical award was debuted in 2022, and the committee announced the launch of a new award, the Diana Jones Emerging Designer Program.

The Diana Jones Committee became a 501(c)(3) registered charity in 2023.

== Past winners ==
- 2001: Peter Adkison, founder of Wizards of the Coast.
- 2002: awarded jointly to Ron Edwards and his game Sorcerer.
- 2003: awarded jointly to Jordan Weisman, a founder of FASA Corporation and WizKids, and to Nobilis second edition.
- 2004: My Life with Master by Paul Czege.
- 2005: Ticket to Ride, the board game by Alan Moon, published by Days of Wonder.
- 2006: Irish Game Convention Charity Auctions, at Gaelcon and Warpcon, for their generosity.
- 2007: The Great Pendragon Campaign, by Greg Stafford, a supplement for the Pendragon role-playing game (published by White Wolf, Inc.).
- 2008: awarded jointly to Grey Ranks by Jason Morningstar, and to Wolfgang Baur and his Open Design business model.
- 2009: Dominion, a card game by Donald X. Vaccarino (published by Rio Grande Games)
- 2010: Boardgamegeek.com, a website edited by Scott Alden and Derk Solko.
- 2011: Fiasco, a roleplaying game by Jason Morningstar.
- 2012: Nordic Larp, a book about the LARP scene in the Nordic countries, edited by Jaakko Stenros and Markus Montola.
- 2013: Tabletop, a web series where various celebrities join Wil Wheaton in playing board games.
- 2014: Hillfolk an RPG by Robin Laws.
- 2015: The Guide to Glorantha by Greg Stafford, Sandy Petersen and Jeff Richard, published by Moon Design Publications. A large two volume sourcebook for Stafford's fantasy world of Glorantha.
- 2016: Eric Lang, game designer
- 2017: Gen Con, the game convention where the Diana Jones Award is presented
- 2018: Actual Play, the "movement within hobby games in which people record and broadcast their game sessions — particularly campaigns of tabletop roleplaying games — over the internet"
- 2019: Star Crossed, a role-playing game by Alex Roberts, published by Bully Pulpit Games
- 2020: Black Excellence in Gaming, awarded to more than two dozen black professionals including Omari Akil, Maurice Broaddus, Allie Bustion, Tanya DePass, Brandon Dixon, Julia B. Ellingboe, Jerry Grayson, Shareef Jackson, Cliff “CJ” Jones, Eric Lang, Eloy Lasanta, Rich Lescouflair, Brandon O’Brien, Cody Pondsmith, Mike Pondsmith, Marcus Ross and Cara Michele Ryan, Laura Simpson, Chris Spivey, Bryan Tillman, Allen Turner, Aaron Trammell, Jabari Weathers, Travis Williams, and Camdon Wright.
- 2021: NIBCARD Games, "A strong and original voice in publishing, creating a community of new makers and players across Africa and setting an example to the rest of the world of how to use games to make a difference."
- 2022: Ajit George, for his activism in advocating for a more representative and diverse hobby games industry.
- 2023: The Coyote & Crow roleplaying game, created by designer Connor Alexander of Coyote & Crow games.
- 2024: United Paizo Workers, a union of workers at Paizo.
- 2025: awarded jointly to Daybreak (board game) and to Rose Estes, the author of the Endless Quest books.
- 2026: Mischief Toy Store, St. Paul, MN. Awarded for continuing activism from Covid to BLM and most recently ICE. "They’ve worked exceptionally hard to make space at the gaming table for everyone, in the midst of upheaval."

== Emerging Designer Program winners ==
The Diana Jones Emerging Designer Program is awarded to "rising and impactful talent in the analog tabletop/hobby games industry" and aims to amplify "the voices of up-and-coming designers with a focus on creators from marginalized communities". It was launched in 2021. Since 2023, the program was awarded to four winners.

- 2021: Jeeyon Shim
- 2022: momatoes (a.k.a. Bianca Canoza)
- 2023: Anthony Joyce-Rivera, Erin Roberts, Kayla Dice, and Sen H.H.S.
- 2024: Quinn Brander, Taylor Navarro, Clarence Simpson, and Basil Wright
- 2025: Ashraf Braden, Elliot Davis, Lyla McBeath Fujiwara, and Marceline Leiman
- 2026: Glaiza Champion, J Strautman, Kodi Gonzaga

== Additional reading ==
- Laws, Robin D. (August 2007). 40 Years of Gen Con. Atlas Games. p. 139. ISBN 978-1-58978-097-2.
