= IndieCade =

Independent game festival

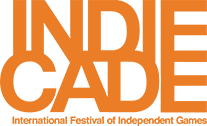
- Logo
- Locations: United States, United Kingdom
- Founded: 2005; 21 years ago
- Website: www.indiecade.com

IndieCade is an international juried festival of independent games. Game types include video games, live-action games, and tabletop games. Independent game developers are selected to demo, screen, and promote their work at the annual IndieCade festival and showcase events. IndieCade also includes a conference track featuring classes, panels, workshops, and keynotes. Since 2020, the annual festival has taken place online under the name IndieCade Anywhere & Everywhere.

The IndieCade festival is the only stand-alone festival open to the public in the United States for exclusively independent games. Games are submitted for consideration to the IndieCade festival jury in the early spring and a selection of finalists for the culminating annual IndieCade festival is determined and announced by the fall. Additional games from the pool of IndieCade submissions are showcased at a variety of events each year around the world.

Ben Fritz for the Los Angeles Times called IndieCade "the video game industry's Sundance."

== IndieCade awards ==
Approximately 40 games each year are selected to exhibit. The finalists are eligible to compete in IndieCade's Red Carpet Awards. Audience Choice and Developer Choice Awards are announced separately during the festival's closing party.

Awards categories vary by year. Typical categories include:

- Best In Show
- Best Story/World Design
- Best Technology
- Best Gameplay Design
- Best Visuals
- Best Sound
- Best Interaction
- Community Impact
- Special Recognition

== Locations and dates ==
Year	Dates	Month	Location
2008	10– 17	October	Bellevue, Washington
2009	1– 4	October	Downtown Culver City
2010	8 –10	October	Downtown Culver City
2011	6 – 9	October	Downtown Culver City
2012	5 – 7	October	Downtown Culver City
2013	3 – 6	October	Downtown Culver City
2014	9 – 12	October	Downtown Culver City
2015	22 – 25	October	Downtown Culver City
2016	14 – 16	October	USC School of Cinematic Arts
2017	6 – 8	October	Little Tokyo at the Japanese American National Museum
2018	12 – 13	October	Santa Monica College – Center for Media & Design
2019	10 – 12	October	Santa Monica College – Center for Media & Design
2020	16 – 24	October	Online ("IndieCade Anywhere and Everywhere")
2021	22 – 24	October	Online ("IndieCade Anywhere and Everywhere")
2022	4 – 11	November	Online ("IndieCade Anywhere and Everywhere")

== Festival events ==
Showcase

The IndieCade showcase is the heart of the IndieCade festival and consists of approximately 40 finalist games selected for their creativity, unique vision, and technological innovation. The showcase involves both digital and physical games. It is free and open to the public.

== History ==
IndieCade was formed by Creative Media Collaborative, an alliance of industry producers and leaders founded in 2005. IndieCade's board of advisors have included (among others) Seamus Blackley, Tracy Fullerton, Megan Gaiser, Andy Gavin, Carl Goodman, John Hight, Robin Hunicke, Henry Jenkins, Richard Lemarchand, Frans Mayra, Jamil Moledina, Janet Murray, Robert Nashak, Carolyn Rauch, Kellee Santiago, Keita Takahashi, Will Wright, and Eric Zimmerman. IndieCade founder is Stephanie Barish, Festival Chair is Celia Pearce, and Festival Director is Sam Roberts.

The festival started as part of E3 before being spun off as an independent event in Bellevue, Washington. In 2009, IndieCade moved its flagship stand-alone festival from Bellevue, Washington, to Culver City (Los Angeles), California, where a Twitter game and an "urban" scavenger hunt were part of the festivities. The Ottawa International Animation Festival (OIAF) partnered with the IndieCade organization in 2009. Each year, IndieCade created a "city-sized arcade" in downtown Culver City. The festival transformed a central blacktop parking lot on Main Street, leveraging the open space by building temporary structures that host parties, individual games, and planned and spontaneous Big Games.

In 2016 IndieCade Europe was rebooted and took place in Paris, where it returned in 2017 and 2018.

Since 2020, the annual IndieCade festival has taken place online under the name IndieCade Anywhere & Everywhere.

=== Previous events ===
Showcase

Prior to the COVID-19 pandemic, the main showcase was known as the "Game Walk" with several games exhibited in various locations across downtown Culver City: the fire station, NextSpace coworking offices, and the Gregg Fleishman Studio, all turned into temporary galleries for the festival.

Night Games

Night Games was an evening centered large-scale physical and hybrid games played outside after dark. Examples of game types included single-player experiences played on a giant screen in front of an audience (SuperHyperCube), multiplayer games that use only certain mechanics such as glowing wands or laser pointers (Johann Sebastian Joust, Renga), and large performance pieces involving many players (Humanoid Asteroids). IndieCade promoted Night Games to feature the beauty and innovation of modern game design in all forms, outside the label of what are commonly perceived to be "traditional" games.

Big Games

The Big Games program served as an extension to IndieCade's mission to promote games of all kinds. Big Games are large, multi-player games played outside and involving physical activity, and range to include technology, tactics, and personal interaction. Big Games were curated by on-site docents, and presented projects such as Ninja (a turn based game of tag), Reality (an Alternate Reality game), and Meatspace Invasion (a mixed virtual/real-world tag/shooting style game). It was free and open to the public.

3D Game Jam

The first IndieCade Mobile 3D Game Jam was hosted in Los Angeles at the University of Southern California's Interactive Media Division on August 6–7, 2011. During the two-day event, 12 teams began the process of creating a fully functional 3D mobile game for the LG Thrill 4G. 6 finalists were chosen to go on to the next round of refining their games in order to compete for the LG Mobile 3D Award at the Red Carpet Award Ceremonies.

Holiday Party

The first annual IndieCade Holiday Party took place at Riot Games headquarters in Santa Monica on December 14, 2011. The fundraiser featured postcard art sent in by the community, available for sale by silent auction. The art show was curated by Glitch Lab. Notable art contributors were Pendleton Ward (creator of Adventure Time), Jason Torchinsky, as well as Amanda Williams and Katherine Rubenstein.

== See also ==
- Independent Games Festival
