= List of tabletop role-playing games =

This is a list of notable tabletop role-playing games. It does not include computer role-playing games, MMORPGs, play-by-mail/email games, or any other video games with RPG elements.

Most of these games are tabletop role-playing games; other types of games are noted as such where appropriate.

Game	Publisher	System	Dates	Setting	Notes
13th Age	Pelgrane Press	Modified d20 OGL ("The Archmage Engine")	2013	High fantasy	Designed by Jonathan Tweet and Rob Heinsoo
The 23rd Letter	Crucible Design		1996		
2300 AD	Game Designers' Workshop		1989	Hard science fiction future of the Twilight 2000 universe	Designed by Frank Chadwick, Timothy B. Brown, Lester W. Smith, Marc W. Miller, originally called Traveller 2300AD
3D&T	Editora Talismã (formerly Trama Editorial)		1994		A Brazilian generic system, turned to anime-style campaigns
7th Sea	Alderac Entertainment Group / John Wick Presents	Roll-and-Keep system, d20 System	1999, 2016	Pirates, swashbuckling	Designed by John Wick (game designer)
Aberrant	White Wolf Publishing	Modified Storyteller	1999	Superhero characters in the near future	Part of the Trinity series
Aberrant	White Wolf Publishing	d20	1999	Superhero characters in the near future	Part of the Trinity series
ACE Agents!	Stellar Games		1992		
Active Exploits	Precis Intermedia Gaming		2002		
Advanced Dungeons & Dragons	TSR, Inc.		1977-2000		(See also Dungeons & Dragons)
Advanced Fighting Fantasy	Cubicle 7		1989		Based on the Fighting Fantasy and Sorcery! gamebooks
Adventure!	Tori Bergquist		1985		
Adventure!	White Wolf Publishing	Modified Storyteller	2001	Pulp adventure	Part of the Trinity series
Adventurers Guild	Adventurers Guild		1987	Line of "generic fantasy" supplements	Consists of The Adventurers' Guild Bestiary, Adventurers' Guild Bounty Hunters' Handbook, Adventurers' Guild Sage's Tome, The Adventurers' Guild Tome
Adventures in Fantasy	Excalibre Games, Adventure Games		1979, 1981	Fantasy	Designed by Dave Arneson and Richard Snider
The Adventures of Indiana Jones Role-Playing Game	TSR, Inc.		1984	Pulp action, fictionalized history	Designed by John Byrne and David "Zeb" Cook
Adventures in Middle-earth	Cubicle 7	d20	2016	Epic high fantasy	Designed by Dominic McDowall-Thomas et al., based on The One Ring RPG
After The Bomb	Palladium Books		1986, 2001	Post-apocalyptic science fiction	Designed by Erick Wujcik
Aftermath!	Fantasy Games Unlimited		1981	Post-apocalypse	Designed by Paul Hume and Robert N. Charrette
Afterwars			1991		
Age of the Tempest	Tactic		2013		
Age of Ruin	Cutting Edge Games		1990		
Agone (French)	Multisim Editions		1999		Edited in French by Multisim Editions and translated in English by Multisim Editions
Albedo	Thoughts & Images, Chessex		1988, 1993	Furry, science fiction	Designed by Craig Hilton and Paul Kidd, based on the comic book series Erma Felna by Steve Gallacci
Alice is Missing	Hunters Entertainment		2020		Designed by Spenser Starke
ALIEN: The Roleplaying Game	Free League	Year Zero Engine	2019	Science fiction, survival horror	
Aliens Adventure Game	Leading Edge Games		1990	Science Fiction	
All Flesh Must Be Eaten	Eden Studios, Inc.	Unisystem	1999, 2003	Zombie survival horror game	Designed by George Vasilakos
All-Star Wrestling	Afterthought Images		1991		
Alma Mater	Oracle Games		1982	Comic high school	
Alshard	Far East Amusement Research / Enterbrain	Standard RPG System	2002, 2005	Fantasy with mecha like Final Fantasy	Far East Amusement Research / Enterbrain
Alshard Gaia	Far East Amusement Research / Enterbrain	Standard RPG System	2006	Contemporary fantasy	
Alternity	TSR, Inc.		1998	Science fiction	Designed by Bill Slavicsek and Richard Baker
Amazing Engine	TSR, Inc.		1993		
Amber Diceless Roleplaying	Phage Press	Custom diceless	1991	Based on The Chronicles of Amber by Roger Zelazny	Created and written by Erick Wujcik
Anima: Beyond Fantasy	Edge Entertainment		2005, 2010		Spanish RPG, a collaboration of Eastern and Western developers RPG with anime-style artworks
Angel	Eden Studios, Inc.	Cinematic Unisystem	2003	Urban fantasy	A spin-off of the Buffy the Vampire Slayer game
Apocalypse Keys	Evil Hat Productions	Powered by the Apocalypse	2023		
Apocalypse World	Lumpley Games	Powered by the Apocalypse	2010	A post-apocalyptic RPG of politics and survival	Created by D. Vincent Baker and Meguey Baker. First RPG using the Powered by the Apocalypse (PbtA) system
Arcana Unearthed	Malhavoc Press	d20 OGL	2003	Fantasy	Developed by Monte Cook
Archaeron	Archaeron Games		1980		
Arduin	Grimoire Games, Emperors Choice Games		1977-1980, 1992	The first cross-genre RPG	Designed by David A. Hargrave
Aria: Canticle of the Monomyth	Last Unicorn Games		1994		
Arianrhod RPG	Fujimi Shobo		2004		Japanese MMORPG-like
Armageddon: 2089	Mongoose Publishing		2003		
Armageddon: The End Times	Myrmidon Press (first edition); Eden Studios, Inc. (second edition)	d20 OGL	2003	Mek-based warfare	
Armored Trooper VOTOMS: The Roleplaying Game	R. Talsorian Games	Fuzion	1997	SciFi game based on the Armored Trooper Votoms anime	
Army of Darkness Roleplaying Game	Eden Studios, Inc.	Cinematic Unisystem	2005	Zombie horror	Designed by Shane Lacy Hensley, based on the film of the same name.
Ars Magica	Lion Rampant (editions 1 & 2)		1987, 1989, 1992, 1996, 2004	Medieval fantasy	Originally developed by Jonathan Tweet and Mark Rein-Hagen, who originated the term "troupe-style play" for it.
Ars Magica	White Wolf Publishing (edition 3)		1987, 1989, 1992, 1996, 2004	Medieval fantasy	Originally developed by Jonathan Tweet and Mark Rein-Hagen, who originated the term "troupe-style play" for it.
Ars Magica	Atlas Games (editions 4 & 5)		1987, 1989, 1992, 1996, 2004	Medieval fantasy	Originally developed by Jonathan Tweet and Mark Rein-Hagen, who originated the term "troupe-style play" for it.
Artesia: Adventures in the Known World	Archaia Studios Press	Modified Fuzion system	2005		Written and illustrated by Mark Smylie, based on his comic book series of the same name.
Ashen Stars	Pelgrane Press	GUMSHOE System	2011	Gritty investigative Space Opera	Designed by Robin D. Laws
Atlantis	Bard Games		1984, 1985, 1996, 2014, 2019	Historical fantasy, sword and sorcery	Designed by Stephan Michael Sechi, Vernie Taylor, Steven Cordovano, J. Andrew Keith
Atomic Robo: The Roleplaying Game	Evil Hat Productions	Fate system	2014	Sci-fi pulp	Based on the comic book of the same name, written by Brian Clevinger.
Attack of the Humans	Rapport Games		1990		
The Authority Role-Playing Game	Guardians of Order		2004		
Avatar Legends: the Roleplaying Game	Magpie Games	Powered by the Apocalypse	2022		Based on Avatar: The Last Airbender
Babylon 5	Mongoose Publishing	d20 (2nd ed.)	2003, 2006 (2nd ed.)		Based on the Babylon 5 TV franchise
Badlands	Cutting Edge Games		1991		
BASH!	Basic Action Games		2005		
Barony	Better Games		1990		
Basic Fantasy RPG	Chris Gonnerman		2006		One of the first Old School Revival retro-clones
Basic Role-Playing	Chaosium		1980, 1982, 2002, 2004, 2008		Generic role-playing game system designed by Greg Stafford and Lynn Willis
Batman Role-Playing Game	Mayfair Games		1989		
BattleDragons	Spartacus Publishing		2002		Play as dragons in a fantasy world
Battlelords of the 23rd Century	SSDC, Inc.		1990, 1991, 1992, 1993, 2000, 2019		
Battlestar Galactica Role Playing Game	Margaret Weis Productions	Cortex System	2007		Based on the SciFi TV series
Behind Enemy Lines	FASA		1982		The first tabletop RPG set during World War II
Beyond the Supernatural	Palladium Books		1987, 2005		Modern Day Horrors
Bifrost	Skytrex Ltd.		1982		
Big Bang Comics RPG	Pisces All Media		2006		
Big Eyes, Small Mouth	Guardians of Order		1997, 2001, 2007, 2020		Anime-based RPG
BIND (BIND Is Not D&D)	PiY (Print it Yourself)	2D6+	2019+	Fenestra	Free and open-source TTRPG
Black Crusade	Fantasy Flight Games	Warhammer 40,000 Roleplay	2011		
The Black Hack	Gold Piece Publications	Modern rules based on original edition of Dungeons & Dragons	2016	High fantasy	
The Black Sword Hack	Livres de l'Ours (1st ed) / The Merry Mushmen (2nd ed)	Modification of The Black Hack	2020–present	Dark fantasy / Sword and sorcery	Developed by Alexandre "Kobayashi" Jeanette, also available in French
Blade of Arcana	Enterbrain, Game Field		1999, 2001, 2006	High fantasy	Japanese-language RPG
Blades in the Dark	Evil Hat Productions	Powered by the Apocalypse	2017	Urban fantasy	
Blade Runner: The Roleplaying Game	Free League Publishing	Year Zero Engine	2023		
Blood Dawn	SSDC, Inc.		1996		
Blood of Heroes	Pulsar Games		1998, 2000		
Blue Planet	Biohazard Games		1997, 2000, 2012		2nd Edition by Fantasy Flight Proposed 3rd Edition by Biohazard Games
Blue Rose	Green Ronin		2005, 2017		
Bluebeard's Bride	Magpie Games	Powered by the Apocalypse	2017	Gothic horror based on the Bluebeard folktale	Designed by Whitney "Strix" Beltrán, Marissa Kelly, and Sarah Richardson
Boot Hill	TSR, Inc.		1975	Wild West adventure	Designed by Brian Blume, Gary Gygax, and Don Kaye.
Brave New World	Pinnacle Entertainment, Alderac Entertainment Group		1999		
Breaking the Ice	Black & Green Games		2005		
Brindlewood Bay	Gauntlet Publishing	Carved From Brindlewood	2022	Murder mystery about elderly women amateur detectives	Inspired by Murder, She Wrote and H. P. Lovecraft
Bubblegum Crisis	R. Talsorian Games	Fuzion	1996	Scifi, Cyberpunk	
Buccaneer	Adversary Games		1979	Pirate-themed RPG	
Buck Rogers XXVC	TSR, Inc.		1990-1992	Science fiction	Written by Flint Dille
Buffy the Vampire Slayer	Eden Studios, Inc.	Unisystem	2002		Designed by C. J. Carella, based on the TV show of the same name
Bullwinkle and Rocky Role-Playing Party Game	TSR, Inc.		1988		Designed by David Cook and Warren Spector, based on characters and settings from The Rocky and Bullwinkle Show
Bunnies and Burrows	Fantasy Games Unlimited		1976	Player characters are rabbits	The first game to encourage players to have non-humanoid roles, and the first to have detailed martial arts and skill systems.
Bureau 13: Stalking the Night Fantastic	Tri Tac Games		1992		
Burn Bryte	Roll20		2020	Science fantasy	Design tailored to be played on a virtual tabletop platform
Burning Empires	Luke Crane		2006	Science fiction	Based on Christopher Moeller's Iron Empires graphic novels
The Burning Wheel	Luke Crane		2002	High fantasy	
Bushido	Fantasy Games Unlimited		1979, 1980, 1981		Samurai RPG set in Feudal Japan
By the Gods	Ragnarok Enterprises		1986		
Cadillacs and Dinosaurs	Game Designer's Workshop		1990		Designed by Frank Chadwick, based on the comic Xenozoic Tales
Cadwallon	Rackham		2006		
Call of Cthulhu	Chaosium	Basic Role-Playing	1981		Designed by Sandy Petersen, based on the works of H. P. Lovecraft
Capes	Muse of Fire Games		2005		
Capes, Cowls & Villains Foul	Spectrum Games		2010		
Cartoon Action Hour	Spectrum Games		2002		
Car Wars	Steve Jackson Games		1980		
Cassiopean Empire	Norton Games		1982		
Castles & Crusades	Troll Lord Games	OGL System	2004	Fantasy RPG	
Castle Falkenstein	R. Talsorian Games		1994	Steampunk fantasy	
The Castle Perilous	West Wind Simulations; Precis Intermedia Gaming		1980		
Challengers	Ragnarok Enterprises		1985		
Champions	Hero Games	Hero System	1981		
Changeling: The Dreaming	White Wolf (1st and 2nd editions) Onyx Path Publishing (20th anniversary edition)	Storyteller System	1995 1997 2017	Original World of Darkness	
Changeling: The Lost	White Wolf Publishing; Onyx Path Publishing	Storytelling System	2007	New World of Darkness	
Children of the Sun	Misguided Games	Token System	2002	Dieselpunk fantasy	
Chill	Pacesetter Ltd; Mayfair Games; Growling Door Games		1984	Horror	
Chivalry & Sorcery	Fantasy Games Unlimited		1977		
Chronicles of Ramlar	Whitesilver Publishing	The A/B System	2006		
City of Mist	Son of Oak Game Studio, Modiphius Entertainment	Powered by the Apocalypse	2017	Urban fantasy, neo-noir	A noir (detective) RPG set in a modern-day city where once-ordinary people hold the power of ancient myths and legends
Commando	Simulations Publications, Inc.		1979		
Companions' Tale			2019		
Conan Role-Playing Game	TSR	"ZeFRS" (Zeb's Fantasy Roleplaying System)	1985	Hyborian Age	The official TSR Conan role-playing game, finally published in 1985
Conan: Adventures in an Age Undreamed Of	Modiphius Entertainment	2d20 system	2017	Hyborian Age	Conan: Adventures in an Age Undreamed Of was developed by a team of game designers, writers and artists, all led by Chris Birch of Modiphius Entertainment. The rights to publish this derivative work were licensed from Conan Properties International
GURPS Conan	Steve Jackson Games	GURPS	1989	Hyborian Age	A year before the release of the core rulebook, in 1988, Steve Jackson Games published a solo adventure titled GURPS Conan: Beyond Thunder River
Conan: The Roleplaying Game	Mongoose Publishing	d20 System	2004-2010	Hyborian Age	One of the role-playing games in the Mongoose Publishing OGL System series
The Confederate Rangers	SoLar-Way Games		1989		
Conspiracy X	Eden Studios, Inc.		1996	Extraterrestrials, UFOs, and government coverups	
Continuum	Aetherco; Dreamcatcher		1999	Time travel adventure	
Core Command	Dream Pod 9	Silhouette game engine	2003	Science fiction, space opera	
Corporation the Roleplaying Game	Core Games Publishing	Brutal Engine	2006	Scifi, Cyberpunk	
CORPS	Blacksburg Tactical Research Center		1990		
Coyote & Crow			2021		
Creeks and Crawdads	Crustacium Games		1986		
Crime Fighter	Task Force Games		1988		
Crimefighters	TSR		1981		
Crystalicum			2006		
CthulhuTech	Wildfire	Framewerk	2007	Horror in the style of H.P. Lovecraft but with mecha and anime influences	
Cutthroat: The Shadow Wars	StormWorld Games	d20; D12	1988		
Cybergeneration	R. Talsorian Games		1993	Alternate setting for Cyberpunk 2020	
Cyberpunk 2013	R. Talsorian Games		1988	An alternate cyberpunk version of the USA, specifically in 2013	Out of print and superseded by Cyberpunk 2020
Cyberpunk 2020	R. Talsorian Games		1990	An alternate cyberpunk version of the USA, specifically in 2020	
Cyberpunk RED	R. Talsorian Games		2020	A sequel to Cyberpunk 2020 and prequel to Cyberpunk 2077	
Cyberspace	Iron Crown Enterprises	Spacemaster system	1989		
Cyborg Commando	New Infinities, Inc.		1987		
D6 Adventure	West End Games		2004		
D6 Fantasy	West End Games		2004		
D6 Space	West End Games		2004		
D6 System	West End Games	In-house system, based on the Star Wars RPG	1996		
d20 Future	Wizards of the Coast	d20 System	2004	Generic futuristic	
d20 Modern	Wizards of the Coast	d20 System	2002	Generic modern	
d20 Past	Wizards of the Coast	d20 System	2005	Generic historical	
d20 System	Wizards of the Coast	Based on Dungeons & Dragons 3rd Edition rules	2000		
Daggerheart	Darrington Press		2025	High Fantasy	
Dallas	Simulations Publications, Inc.		1980		Based on the popular television soap opera Dallas.
Danger International	Hero Games		1985	Espionage adventure	
Dangerous Journeys	Game Designers' Workshop		1992	Fantasy	Designed by E. Gary Gygax, eventually discontinued because of lawsuits by TSR
Daredevils	Fantasy Games Unlimited		1982	Pulp-era mystery	
Dark Ages	White Wolf Publishing		1996, 2002, 2003		Series of RPGs, including Vampire: The Dark Ages, Dark Ages: Werewolf, Dark Ages: Mage, Dark Ages: Fae, and Dark Ages: Inquisitor
Dark Champions	Hero Games	Hero System	1993, 2004		Designed by Steven S. Long
Dark Conspiracy	Game Designers' Workshop		1991	Cyberpunk, near-future dystopia, horror, urban fantasy	Designed by Lester W. Smith
Dark Dungeons			2010		Retroclone emulating the Dungeons & Dragons Rules Cyclopedia
The Dark Eye	Schmidt Spiel & Freizeit GmbH and Droemer Knaur Verlag, Fantasy Productions, Ulisses Spiele GmbH		1984, 1988, 1993, 2001, 2006, 2015	High fantasy	Created by Ulrich Kiesow, the most popular German RPG, known in Germany as Das Schwarze Auge
Dark Heresy, the Warhammer 40,000 Roleplay Game	Originally by Black Industries, now developed by Fantasy Flight Games		2008		
Dark Streets	Cakebread & Walton		2012		
Darwin's World	RPGObjects		2001, 2003, 2005	Post-apocalyptic RPG	
Dawning Star		d20 System	2005		
DC Adventures	Green Ronin	Mutants & Masterminds	2010		
DC Heroes	Mayfair Games	Mayfair Exponential Game System	1985, 1989, 1993		
DC Universe Roleplaying Game	West End Games	D6 System	1999		
De Profundis	Michał Oracz		2001		
Dead Friend: A Game of Necromancy	Hit Point Press		2018		Designed by Lucian Kahn
Dead Inside	Atomic Sock Monkey Press	PDQ	2003	A small-press RPG where the characters attempt to rebuild their lost souls through selfless and noble actions (and get superhuman powers along the way)	
Dead Reign	Palladium Books	Megaversal	2008		
Deadlands: Hell on Earth	Pinnacle Entertainment Group		1998		
Deadlands: Lost Colony	Pinnacle Entertainment Group		2002		
Deadlands: The Weird West	Pinnacle Entertainment Group		1996, 1999, 2006		GURPS version by SJGames
Deathwatch	Fantasy Flight	Warhammer 40,000 Roleplay	2010		
Deliria: Faerie Tales for the New Millennium	Laughing Pan Productions		2003		
Delta Force: America Strikes Back!	Task Force Games		1986	Modern military, espionage	Designed by William H. Keith Jr.
Delta Green	Arc Dream Publishing	Call of Cthulhu, d100 "Misery Engine", GUMSHOE	1996, 2016	Modern Lovecraftian horror and conspiracy	
Degenesis: Rebirth	SIXMOREVODKA	KatharSys	2014	Primal Punk	
Demon City Shinjuku Role-Playing Game	Guardians of Order	Tri-Stat System	1999	Anime-inspired supernatural horror	Based on the novel and anime series of the same name
Demon Hunters Role Playing Game	Margaret Weis Productions	Cortex System	2008		Based on the films Demon Hunters and Demon Hunters: Dead Camper Lake by Dead Gentlemen Productions
Demon: The Fallen	White Wolf Publishing	Storyteller System	2002	Original World of Darkness	
Demon's Lair	Lasalion Games		1997		
Deryni Adventure Game	Grey Ghost Games	Fudge RPG	2005		
Dialect	Thorny Games		2019		
Diana: Warrior Princess	Steve Jackson Games		2003		By Marcus Rowland
Diaspora	VSCA Publishing	FATE	2009	Hard science fiction	
Die			2022		Designed by Kieron Gillen and Stephanie Hans
Dinky Dungeons	Doc's Games		1985		
Dinosaur Planet: Broncosaurus Rex	Goodman Games	d20 System	2001		
Diomin	OtherWorld Creations	d20 System	2000		
Do: Pilgrims of the Flying Temple	Evil Hat Productions		2011		
The Doctor Who Role Playing Game	FASA		1985		Based on the 1963–89 run of the BBC television series
Doctor Who – Adventures In Time And Space: The Roleplaying Game	Cubicle 7 Entertainment	Vortex	2009		Based on the 2005–present run of the BBC television series
Doctor Who – Time Lord (role-playing game)	Virgin Publishing		1991		Based on the 1963–89 run of the BBC television series
Dog Eat Dog			2012		
Dogs in the Vineyard	Lumpley Games		2004, 2005	Loosely based on the Mormon State of Deseret in pre-statehood Utah	Designed by D. Vincent Baker
Dolmenwood: Adventure and Peril in Fairytale Woods	Exalted Funeral		2024		Dolmenwood Campaign Book published in 2025
Domination	StarChilde Publications		1989		
Dominion Rules		An open-source fantasy twelve-sided-die-based RPG encouraging innovative combat system	1999		
The Dominion Tank Police Role-Playing Game	Guardians of Order	Tri-Stat System	1999		
Donjon	Anvilwerks		2002	Fantasy	Designed by Zak Arntson and Clinton R. Nixon
Don't Look Back	Mind Ventures		1994		
Don't Rest Your Head	Evil Hat Productions		2006		
Drací doupe	ALTAR	Loosely based on Dungeons & Dragons	1990, 2004, 2011		The most popular Czech fantasy RPG system
Dragon Age	Green Ronin		2010		Based on the Dragon Age video game series by BioWare.
Dragonlance: Fifth Age	TSR	SAGA System	1996	Dragonlance	
Dragon Lords of Melniboné	Chaosium	d20 System	2001		
DragonMech	Goodman Games	A cross between fantasy and mecha	2004		
DragonQuest	Simulations Publications		1980, 1982, 1989		A now out-of-print RPG, suppressed by TSR
DragonRaid	Dick Wulf		1984	A Christian RPG	
Dragonroar	Standard Games		1985		
Dragonstar	Fantasy Flight Games	d20	2001	"Where science fiction and fantasy blend"	
Dragon Storm	Black Dragon Press		1996		
Dragon Warriors	Corgi Books	An easy-to-use RPG system published in paperback format	1985		
Drakar och Demoner (Dragons and Demons)	Target Games		1982	Swedish fantasy RPG	
Draw Steel	MCDM Productions		2025	High Fantasy	
Dread RPG	The Impossible Dream		2005		Uses a Jenga tower for action resolution
Dread: The First Book of Pandemonium	Rafael Chandler		2002, 2007		
Dream Askew, Dream Apart			2018		Designed by Avery Alder and Benjamin Rosenbaum
Dream Park: The Roleplaying Game	R. Talsorian Games		1992		Based on the 1981 novel Dream Park, which is itself about a live-action role-playing game amusement park.
The Dresden Files	Evil Hat Productions	A variant of the FATE game	2010	Urban fantasy	Based on the books by Jim Butcher
Droids	Integral Games		1983		
Dune: Chronicles of the Imperium	Last Unicorn Games		2000		Supposedly limited to 3000 copies
Dungeons & Dragons	Created by Dave Arneson and E. Gary Gygax, further editions by TSR, Inc. and Wizards of the Coast		1974–present		
Dungeon Crawl Classics	Goodman Games	Based on System Reference Document	2012	Old school fantasy	An OGL system that cross-breeds Appendix N with a streamlined version of 3E
Dungeon Squad	Jason Morningstar		2005		
Dungeon World	Sage Kobold Productions	Powered by the Apocalypse	2012	Dungeon fantasy	
Durance	Bully Pulpit Games		2012		
Dust Devils	Chimera Creative		2002, 2007		
Dying Earth	Pelgrane Press	Dying Earth (genre)	2001		Designed by Robin D. Laws, based on the stories of Jack Vance
Dzikie Pola (Wild Fields)	Wydawnictwo MAG		1997, 2005	Set in 17th century Polish–Lithuanian Commonwealth	
EABA	Blacksburg Tactical Research Center		2003	A generic RPG system	a.k.a. End All Be All
Earth 2020	Self-published		1983	Role-playing game	By Stephen Kyffin
Earthdawn	FASA		1993-2015	Fantasy post-apocalypse; ambiguously a predecessor in the timeline of the Shadowrun setting	
Eat the Reich	Rowan, Rook and Decard		2023	World War II, horror	A one-shot game of heroic vampires sucking the blood of Nazis, designed by Grant Howitt
Eclipse Phase	Posthuman Studios	d100	2009	Sci-fi	
Ehdrigohr	Council of Fools	FATE 3.0	2013	Post-apocalyptic Indigenous	Nine indigenous tribes survive on world without colonizers
El-Hazard Role-Playing Game	Guardians of Order		2001		
Eldritch Role-Playing System	Goodman Games		2008		
Element Masters	Escape Ventures		1983		
Elfquest	Chaosium	Basic Role-Playing	1984	Based on the works of Richard Pini and Wendy Pini	
Elfs	Adept Press		2001		
Elric!	Chaosium	Basic Role-Playing	1993	Based on Michael Moorcock's Elric of Melniboné stories	
Empire of the Petal Throne	TSR, Inc		1974, 1987, 2005	Set in M. A. R. Barker's world of Tékumel	
En Garde!	Game Designers' Workshop and SFC Press		1975, 1977, 1988, 2005	Duelists from 17th century France	
The End	Scapegoat Games		1995		Banned from Gen Con by TSR
Enforcers	21st Century Games		1987		
Engel	Feder & Schwert	d20 System	2002		
Eon	Neogames		1996	Swedish fantasy game	
The Esoterrorists	Pelgrane Press	GUMSHOE System	2006	Occult, investigative horror	Designed by Robin D. Laws
Espionage!	Hero Games		1983		Designed by George MacDonald and Steve Peterson, based on Second Edition Champions
Eternal Soldier	Tai-Gear Simulations		1985	Free Universal Role-Playing system	
Etherscope	Goodman Games	d20 Modern	2005		
The Everlasting	Visionary Entertainment Studios Inc		1997		
EverQuest Role-Playing Game	White Wolf Publishing	d20 System	2002	Fantasy	Pencil & paper version of the popular MMORPG series of the same name, designed by Owen K.C. Stephens et al.
Everway			1995		
Ex Machina	Guardians of Order	Tri-Stat d8, d20 System	2004	Scifi, Cyberpunk	
Exalted	White Wolf Publishing	Storyteller System	2001, 2006, 2016	Epic fantasy; potential pre-history of World of Darkness	
Exodus: Post Apocalyptic RPG	Glutton Creeper Games	d20	2008		
Expendables	Stellar Games		1987		
The Extraordinary Adventures of Baron Munchausen	Hogshead Publishing		1998	A storytelling RPG based on the stories about Baron Munchausen	Created by James Wallis
Fading Suns	Holistic Design	d20 System	1996, 1999, 2001, 2007, 2012		
Fabula Ultima	Need Games		2023		Inspired by Japanese role-playing video games such as the Dragon Quest and Final Fantasy series
Fanhunter	Gusa Comics/Farsa's Wagon		1992		Spanish game based on the series of comics of the same name
Fantasy Craft	Crafty Games	Mastercraft	2009		
Fantasy Earth	Zody Games		1994		Includes Fantasy Earth: Basic Rules, Fantasy Earth: The Book of Magic, and The Essential Fantasy Earth
Fantasy Hero	Hero Games	Hero System	2003		
The Fantasy Trip	Steve Jackson, published by Metagaming Concepts		1977, 2019		The precursor to GURPS
Fantasy Wargaming	Patrick Stephens Limited		1981		
Farscape Roleplaying Game	Alderac Entertainment Group	d20 System	2002		
F.A.T.A.L.	Byron Hall	Custom	2001-2004	Fantasy	Adult-oriented role-playing. "Fantasy Adventure To Adult Lechery"
Fate Core	Evil Hat	Fate system	2003, 2006, 2013	Generic	Fantastic Adventures in Tabletop Entertainment based on the FUDGE engine. No longer an acronym. There are other games that use the FATE engine
Fate of the Norns	Andrew Valkauskas	Runic Game System (RGS) – Previous editions used a 2D10 based system	1993, 2002, 2006, 2012	Viking fantasy	
Fates Worse than Death	Vajra Enterprises			Cyberpunk-influenced game set in Manhattan in 2080	
F'Dech Fo's Tomb	Judges Guild		1981		
Fear Itself	Pelgrane Press	Gumshoe System	2007	Horror	Designed by Robin D. Laws
Feng Shui	Daedalus Entertainment, Atlas Games		1996, 1999, 2015	Hong Kong martial arts movies	Designed by Robin D. Laws
Fiasco	Bully Pulpit Games	Custom	2009	Various	Designed by Jason Morningstar
Field Guide to Encounters	Judges Guild		1982		
Field Guide to Memory			2021		Designed by Jeeyon Shim and Shing Yin Khor
Fifth Cycle	Shield Games		1990		
Fighting Fantasy: The Introductory Role-Playing Game	Puffin Books		1982		Created by Ian Livingstone and Steve Jackson, based on the Fighting Fantasy book series
Fireborn	Fantasy Flight Games		2004		
Firefly	Margaret Weis Productions	Cortex+	2014-2015	Based on the television series Firefly	Designed by Monica Valentinelli and Cam Banks, a separate game from Serenity due to licensing issues, despite the same company producing both at different times
Flash Gordon & the Warriors of Mongo	Fantasy Games Unlimited		1977		The first role-playing game to be based on a pre-existing media property.
Flashing Blades	Fantasy Games Unlimited		1984		
For the Queen (game)	Darrington Press, Evil Hat Productions		2019		
Forbidden Kingdoms	OtherWorld Creations	d20 System	2001, 2006		
Forbidden Lands	Free League Publishing	Year Zero Engine	2018	Medieval fantasy post-apocalypse	
Forgotten Futures	Marcus L. Rowland		1993, 1998, 2005		
Freedom Fighters	Fantasy Games Unlimited		1986		
Fringeworthy	Tri Tac Games		1982, 1984, 1992, 2009		
FTL:2448	Tri Tac Games		1982, 1985, 1990		
FUDGE	Steffan O'Sullivan	FUDGE	1992		"Free, Universal, Do-it-yourself Gaming Engine"
Furry Pirates	Atlas Games		1999		
Future Worlds	Stellar Gaming Workshop		1987		
Fuzion	R. Talsorian Games and Hero Games	Modified from R. Talsorian's Interlock System and Hero Games' Hero System	1998	A simple and customizable generic open gaming system	
A Game of Thrones	Guardians of Order	d20	2005	A Game of Thrones	
Gamma World	TSR, Inc., Wizards of the Coast, Sword and Sorcery Studios	Custom (1st–4th edition) Alternity (5th edition) d20 System (6th–7th edition)	1978, 1983, 1986, 1992, 2000, 2003, 2010	Post-apocalypse science fantasy	Originally designed by James M. Ward and Gary Jaquet, with different editions based on different versions of D&D
Gangbusters	TSR, Inc.		1982, 1990, 2019	1920s American Prohibition-era urban crime adventure	Designed by Rick Krebs and Mark Acres
Gangster!	Fantasy Games Unlimited		1979		
Gatecrasher	Grey Ghost Press	Fudge	1996	A tongue-in-cheek science-fiction & fantasy setting	
Gear Krieg	Dream Pod 9		2001		
Geist: The Sin-Eaters	White Wolf Publishing	Storytelling System	2009	New World of Darkness	
Ghost Dog: The Way of the Samurai	Guardians of Order	Tri-Stat System	2000		
Ghostbusters: A Frightfully Cheerful Roleplaying Game	West End Games	Precursor to D6 System	1986, 1989	Supernatural comedy	Created by Sandy Petersen, Lynn Willis, and Greg Stafford, based on the Ghostbusters film series. First RPG to use a dice pool system
Ghosts of Albion	Eden Studios, Inc.	Unisystem	2008, 2011	Horror, drama, Victoriana	Based on the Ghosts of Albion animations and novels by Amber Benson and Christopher Golden
Ghoulash: The Last Game on Earth	Mike Suchcicki		1982		
Godlike	Hawthorn Hobgoblynn Press	One-Roll Engine	2001		
Golden Heroes	Games Workshop		1984	Superheroes	
Good Society	Storybrewers		2018	Regency romance	Based on the Regency era novels of Jane Austen
Grey Ranks	Bully Pulpit Games		2007		
Grimm	Fantasy Flight Games	Linear D6	2004		
GUMSHOE System	Pelgrane Press	Gumshoe System	2007		By Robin D. Laws
Gunslingers and Gamblers	FJGaming		2006	The American Wild West of 1876	
GURPS	Steve Jackson Games	GURPS	1985, 1986, 1988, 2004	Generic	Gurps is an acronym for "Generic Universal Role Playing System"
HackMaster	Kenzer & Company	Custom, derived from AD&D system	2001, 2009, 2011		Based on the comic Knights of the Dinner Table
Hahlmabrea	Sutton Hoo Games		1991		
Halcyon	Neuwerld Studios	Prodigy System	2008		
Happy Birthday, Robot!	Evil Hat Productions		2010		A storytelling game specifically aimed at children
HârnMaster	Columbia Games		1986, 1996, 2002	Hârn	
Haven: City of Violence	Louis Porter Jr. Design	d20 System	2003		
Hawkmoon	Chaosium	Basic Role-Playing	1986	An addendum to the Stormbringer RPG (a.k.a. Elric!)	By Kerie Campbell-Robson, based on Michael Moorcock's The History of the Runestaff
Heart: The City Beneath	Rowan, Rook & Decard	Resistance System	2020	Dark fantasy	Designed by Grant Howitt and Christopher Taylor
Heaven & Earth	Event Horizon Productions	Tri-Stat System	1998		
Heavy Gear	Dream Pod 9		1994		
Hercules & Xena Roleplaying Game	West End Games	D6 System	1998		Based on the syndicated action series Hercules: The Legendary Journeys and Xena: Warrior Princess
Hero System	Hero Games		1990, 2002, 2004, 2009		
HeroQuest/Hero Wars	Issaries, Inc.	Narrative	2000, 2003, 2009, 2015, 2020		
Heroes	Tabletop Games (UK)		1979		
Heroes of Olympus	Task Force Games		1981		
Heroes Unlimited	Palladium Books	Megaversal system	1984, 1987, 1993, 1998	Superhero	Written by Kevin Siembieda
Hidden Kingdom	New Rules Inc.		1985		
High Adventure Cliffhangers Buck Rogers Adventure Game	TSR, Inc.		1993	Science fiction	Based on the novel Armageddon 2419 A.D. and subsequent Buck Rogers comic strips
High Adventure Role Playing (HARP)	Iron Crown Enterprises		2003		
High Colonies	Waterford Publishing House, Ltd.		1988		
High Fantasy	Fantasy Productions, Reston Publishing		1978, 1981		
Hillfolk	Pelgrane Press	Dramasystem	2013		Designed by Robin D. Laws
HoL	Black Dog Game Factory		1994, 2002		
Hollow Earth Expedition	Exile Games Studio		2006	1930's style pulp adventure	
Hollyworld	Blacksburg Tactical Research Center		2005		
Honey Heist	Rowan, Rook & Decard	Modified Lasers & Feelings	2017	Comedy heist	Designed by Grant Howitt
Hong Kong Action Theater	Event Horizon Productions		1996, 2001		
Houses of the Blooded			2008		
How We Came To Live Here	Galileo Games		2010		
Hunter Planet	H-PAC		1986		
Hunter: The Reckoning	White Wolf Publishing Renegade Game Studios	Storyteller System	1999, 2022	World of Darkness personal horror	Designed by Andrew Bates, Phil Brucato, Ken Cliffe, Jess Heinig, Mike Tinney, Stewart Wieck, et al.
Hunter: The Vigil	White Wolf Publishing, Onyx Path Publishing	Storytelling System	2008, 2022	Chronicles of Darkness personal horror	Designed by Justin Achilli, Rich Thomas, and Chuck Wendig (1st ed.), and Monica Valentinelli (2nd ed.)
Hyborian War	Reality Simulations Inc.		1984	Hyborian Age	Based on the world of Conan the Barbarian by Robert E. Howard
Hyperborea RPG	North Wind Adventures	Largely AD&D-based	2012–present	Sword and sorcery and "weird science"	Setting builds on Conan and other sword and sorcery stories as well as works of Lovecraft
If I Were a Lich, Man	Hit Point Press		2023		Designed by Lucian Kahn
I'm Sorry Did You Say Street Magic			2019		
Immortal: The Invisible War	Ran Valerhon		1993		
In Dark Alleys	Vajra Enterprises		2007		
In Nomine	Steve Jackson Games	Based on In Nomine Satanis / Magna Veritas	1997		
In Nomine Satanis / Magna Veritas	Croc (Siroz)		1989, 1993, 1997, 2003, 2015	Satiric gang/spy wars involving angels and demons in the contemporary world	French
Incursion	Tri Tac Games		1992		
Infernum	Mongoose Publishing				
Infinity	The Infinity Company		1979		
Inner City	Inner City Games		1982		
Inou Tsukai	Enterbrain		2001		
InSpectres	Memento Mori Theatricks		2002		
Interstellar Elite Combat	Game Masters Associated		1991		
Invisible Sun	Monte Cook Games	Related to Cypher System	2018-2020	The Actuality, comprising eight worlds arranged in the Path of Suns	Surreal fantasy where the players take the roles of powerful magic-users
Iron Kingdoms	Privateer Press	d20 System	2004		
Ironhedge	Empire Wargames		1979		
Iron Heroes	Fiery Dragon Productions	d20 system	2005		Based on making D&D playable without magic
Ironsworn	Shawn Tomkin	Powered by the Apocalypse	2018		
It Came From The Late, Late, Late Show	Stellar Games		1989		
It Was a Mutual Decision	Ron Edwards		2006		
Jadeclaw	Sanguine Productions Ltd		2002		
James Bond 007: Role-Playing in Her Majesty's Secret Service	Victory Games, a branch of Avalon Hill		1983	The world of the James Bond franchise	
Jeremiah: The Roleplaying Game	Mongoose Publishing				Based on the TV series
Jiangshi: Blood in the Banquet Hall	Wet Ink Games / Game and a Curry		2021		Designed by Banana Chan and Sen-Foong Lim
John Carter, Warlord of Mars	Heritage Models		1978		
Jorune (or Skyrealms of Jorune)	SkyRealms Publishing		1984		
Jovian Chronicles	Dream Pod 9		1997		
Judge Dredd: The Role-Playing Game	Games Workshop		1985-1989	Set in the world of Judge Dredd from the British comics 2000 AD	
The Judge Dredd Roleplaying Game	Mongoose Publishing	d20 System	2002	Set in the world of Judge Dredd from the British comics 2000 AD	
The Judge Dredd Roleplaying Game	Mongoose Publishing	Traveller	2009	Set in the world of Judge Dredd from the British comics 2000 AD	New edition of the previous 2002 game, with different rules.
Justice, Inc.	Hero Games	Hero System	1984		1930s Pulp fiction oriented adventure
Justifiers	StarChilde Publications		1988		Play as human/animal hybrids (Betas) that are owned by "the Corporation"; locate new resources, eliminate threats, and buy your freedom
KABAL	Kabal Gaming Systems		1982		
Khaotic	Marquee Press		1994		
Kids on Bikes	Hunters Entertainment		2019		
kill puppies for satan (sic)	Lumpley Games		2001		Designed by D. Vincent Baker
Killer	Steve Jackson Games		1981		Live action role-playing game
Kindred of the East	White Wolf Publishing	Storyteller System	1998	Old World of Darkness	Spinoff of Vampire: The Masquerade
Kindred of the Ebony Kingdom	White Wolf Publishing	Storyteller System	2003	Old World of Darkness	Spinoff of Vampire: The Masquerade
Knights and Magick	Heritage USA		1980		
Knights of the Round Table	Little Soldier Games		1976	Set in Camelot	
Kobolds Ate My Baby!	9th Level Games		1999, 2001, 2005		
Koriko: A Magical Year			2023		
Krysztaly Czasu	MAG		1993		Polish, Crystals of Time
Kult	Äventyrsspel		1991		Swedish game based on Gnostic concepts with some Kabbalistic undertones
Labyrinth Lord	Goblinoid Games	D&D Basic Set	2007, 2009		
Lace and Steel	Published originally by TAGG and re-released by Pharos Press		1989		An Australian RPG set in a world of civilised Centaurs and Harpies with a musketeers/swashbuckling feel
Lady Blackbird			2009		
Lancer	Massif Press, Dark Horse Comics		2019		
Land of the Rising Sun	Fantasy Games Unlimited	Chivalry & Sorcery	1980		Samurai and Ninjas
A Land Once Magic	moreblueberries		2026		
Lands of Adventure	Fantasy Games Unlimited		1983		
The Last Exodus	Synister Creative Systems		2000		
The Laundry	Cubicle 7	Basic Role-Playing	2010	Lovecraftian horror, spy thriller, science fiction, workplace humour	Based on Charles Stross's The Laundry Files series
Legacy	Legacy Press		1978		
Legend of the Five Rings Role-Playing Game	Alderac Entertainment Group	Roll & Keep	1997, 2000, 2005, 2010, 2018		The game uses the Legend of the Five Rings setting, primarily the nation of Rokugan, which is based on feudal Japan with influences from other East Asian cultures.
Legends of Anglerre	Cubicle 7		2010		
Legionnaire	FASA		1990	Standalone role-playing game for the Renegade Legion universe	
Lejendary Adventure	Hekaforge Productions		1999		Created by Gary Gygax
Leverage	Margaret Weis Productions	Cortex Plus	2010	Based on the Leverage TV series	Game written by Cam Banks and Rob Donahuge
Leystorm: The Dominion	RoleFile Games		1996		
Liminal Horror			2023		
Little Fears – The Role-playing Game of Childhood Terror	Key 20 Publishing		2001		
Living Steel	Leading Edge Games	Phoenix Command	1987	Futuristic game on the world of Rhand	
Lone Wolf	Mongoose Publishing	d20 System	1984		A series of gamebooks and Lone Wolf: The Roleplaying Game; also a second game by Mongoose, the Lone Wolf Multiplayer Game Book
Lord of the Rings Adventure Game	Iron Crown Enterprises		1991-1999	Based upon the fantasy works of J. R. R. Tolkien	
The Lord of the Rings Roleplaying Game	Decipher, Inc.		2002-2006	Based upon the fantasy works of J. R. R. Tolkien	
Lords of Creation	Avalon Hill		1983		
Ma Nishtana			2023		
Mach: The First Colony	Alliance Publications		1983		
Macho Women with Guns	Blacksburg Tactical Research Center		1988, 1994, 2003		
Macross II: The Role-Playing Game	Palladium Books	Megaversal	1993		
Maelstrom	Puffin Books		1984		
Mage: The Ascension	White Wolf Publishing (1st, 2nd and revised editions) Onyx Path Publishing (20th anniversary edition)	Storytelling System	1993 1995 2000 2015	Set in the original World of Darkness	
Mage: The Awakening	White Wolf Publishing	Storytelling System	2005, 2016	Chronicles of Darkness	
Mage: The Sorcerer's Crusade	White Wolf Publishing	Storyteller System	1998	World of Darkness	
Malefices	Jeux Descartes		1985		The first original French-language horror role-playing game.
Man, Myth & Magic	Yaquinto; Precis Intermedia Gaming		1982	RPG drawing on myths and legends of cultures from 4000 B.C.E. to 1000 C.E.	
Manhunter	Kingslayer Productions		1988		
Marvel Heroic Roleplaying	Margaret Weis Productions	Cortex Plus	2012		
Marvel Super Heroes Adventure Game	TSR	SAGA System	1998		
Marvel Super Heroes Role-Playing Game	TSR, Inc.		1984, 1986		
Marvel Universe Roleplaying Game	Marvel Comics		2003		
Masks: A New Generation	Magpie Games	Powered by the Apocalypse	2017		
Masterbook	West End Games; Precis Intermedia Gaming		1994		
The Masters of the Universe Role Playing Game	FASA		1985		
Mechamorphosis	Fantasy Flight Games	d20 System	2004		
Mechanical Men	Cliff Hanger Games		1985		
Mechanical Dream	SteamLogic		2002		
The Mechanoid Invasion	Palladium Books		1981		
MechWarrior	FASA Corporation, Fantasy Productions LLC		1986		
MEGA Role-Playing System	MEGA Games Ltd.		1987		
Megaverse	Palladium Books		1981		
Mekton	R. Talsorian Games	Interlock System	1985, 1987, 1994	Based on Anime Mecha science fiction	
Melanda: Land of Mystery	Wilmark Dynasty		1980		
Men in Black: The Roleplaying Game	West End Games	D6 System	1997	Science fiction comedy	Based on the first Men in Black film
MERC	Fantasy Games Unlimited		1981		A Modern Role Playing Game of Counter Insurgency
Merc: 2000	GDW		1990	post-apocalyptic military	Twilight 2000 updated for the post-Cold War '90s
Mercenaries, Spies and Private Eyes	Flying Buffalo	Custom Tunnels and Trolls derivative	1983, 1986, 2019		
The Metabarons Roleplaying Game	West End Games				
Metamorphosis Alpha	TSR, Inc. (1st and 2nd editions)	Custom (1st edition), Amazing Engine (2nd edition)	1976	Set on a generation spaceship, the starship Warden, long after an unknown cataclysmic event	3rd edition published by Fast Forward Entertainment, 4th by Mudpuppy Games
Metascape	The Game Lords		1993		
Michtim: Fluffy Adventures			2012		
Microscope			2011		
Middle Earth Role Play	Iron Crown Enterprises	Streamlined Rolemaster	1984, 1986, 1993	Based upon the fantasy works of J. R. R. Tolkien	
Midgard	Midgard Press		1981, 1985, 1989, 2000, 2013		The oldest German fantasy RPG
Midnight	Fantasy Flight Games, Edge Studios	Dungeons & Dragons	2003	A dark fantasy world where the bad guys have won	
Midnight at the Well of Souls Role-Playing System	TAG Industries		1985		Based on the "Well of Souls" novels by Jack L. Chalker.
Millennium's End	Chameleon Eclectic Entertainment		1991		
M.I.S.S.I.O.N.	Kabal Gaming Systems		1982		By Deiron e Yangsmoth
Mistborn Adventure Game	Crafty Games		2011		Based on American author Brandon Sanderson's Mistborn novel series
Mojo	Polymancer Studios, Inc.		2004		
Monastyr	Wydawnictwo Portal	3d20 system	2004		Polish, Monastery
Monsterhearts	Buried Without Ceremony	Powered by the Apocalypse	2012, 2017	Teen drama, paranormal romance, horror	A game about the messy lives of teenage monsters by Joe Mcdaldno (1st ed.), designed by Avery Alder (2nd ed.)
Monsters! Monsters!	Metagaming Concepts		1976	Fantasy system where the player characters are monsters	
Monsters and Other Childish Things	Arc Dream Publishing	One-Roll Engine	2007		
Mordheim	Games Workshop		1999		A variant of the company's Warhammer Fantasy game set on a warband or "skirmish" scale.
Mörk Borg	Free League Publishing		2020	Heavy metal music-inspired fantasy	
Morpheus	Rapport Games		1990		
The Morrow Project	Timeline Ltd.	Timeline System	1980, 1983, 2013	Post apocalypse USA 150 years after WW III	
Mortasheen	Jonathan Wojcik	Blocks System	2025	Science fiction, comedy horror	
Morton's List	Dark Carnival Games, LLC				
Mothership	Tuesday Knight Games	Old School Revival-style d100 rules	2018, 2024	Space horror	Designed by Sean McCoy.
Mouse Guard	Archaia Entertainment	A version of the Burning Wheel engine	2008		By Luke Crane, based on David Petersen's comics series of the same name.
Multiverser	Valdron, Inc.		1997		By E.R. Jones and M. Joseph Young
Mummy: The Resurrection	White Wolf	Storyteller System	2001	World of Darkness	
Murphy's World	Peregrine Creative Services	Weapons & Wonder	1995		
Mutant	Target Games	Basic Role-Playing	1984, 1989		
Mutant Chronicles	Target Games		1993		
Mutant City Blues	Pelgrane Press	GUMSHOE System	2009		Superhero detectives
Mutant Future	Goblinoid Games		2008, 2010		
Mutant RYMD	Target Games		1992		
Mutant: Undergångens Arvtagare	Target Games		2002		By Järnringen Förlag AB
Mutants & Masterminds	Green Ronin Publishing	d20 System	2002–present	Comic book style superheroes, typically scifi	Currently in its 4th edition. Written by Steve Kenson.
Mutazoids	Whit Productions Inc		1989		
My Life with Master	Half Meme Press		2003	Comic horror, Gothic horror	Written by Paul Czege
Myrskyn aika	Johnny Kniga Kustannus		2003		By Mike Pohjola
Mythworld	Hippogriff Publications		1986		
Necronautilus	World Champ Games Co.		2020		Designed by Adam Vass
Neighborhood	Wheaton Publications		1982		
Nephilim	Chaosium		1992	Modern occult	
Neuroshima	Portal		2003		Polish
Nexus: The Infinite City	Daedalus Games		1994		
Nicotine Girls	Half Meme Press		2002	"A roleplaying game of teenage, lower-income girls looking for happiness."	Designed by Paul Czege
Nightbane	Palladium Books		1995	Dark fantasy	
Nightlife	Stellar Games		1990	Horror	
Night of the Ninja	IIE Games Corporation		1986		
Night's Black Agents	Pelgrane Press	GUMSHOE System	2012	Horror-espionage vampire-hunting	Created by Kenneth Hite
Night Wizard!	Enterbrain		2002, 2007	Wizards in contemporary times	Japanese
Ninja Burger	Steve Jackson Games	PDQ	2001		
Ninjas and Superspies	Palladium Books	Megaversal	1987, 1990, 2000, 2001	Martial arts and espionage adventure.	
Nobilis	Pharos Press, Hogshead Publishing, Eos Press	Diceless resource-management, optional live action system	1999, 2002, 2011		Created by Jenna K. Moran, writing as R. Sean Borgstrom
Noctum	Mongoose Publishing		2005, 2007, 2009, 2015		
Noir: the Film Noir Role-Playing Game	Archon Gaming		1996		
Northern Crown	Atlas Games	d20 System	2005		
No Thank You, Evil!	Monte Cook Games	Cypher System variant	2016		
Numenera	Monte Cook Games	Cypher System	2013	Science fantasy	Designed by Monte Cook
Odysseus	Fantasy Games Unlimited		1980		
Of Gods and Men	Non Sequitur Productions		1991		
The Official Superhero Adventure Game	Brian Phillips		1981		
Old-School Essentials	Necrotic Gnome	Restatement of the Basic and Expert Sets of Dungeons & Dragons.	2019	Fantasy	Designed by Gavin Norman.
Omnigon	Omnigon Games		1989		
The One Ring Roleplaying Game	Free League Publishing		2011, 2022	Epic high fantasy	Set in J. R. R. Tolkien's Middle-earth, at the time between The Hobbit and The Lord of the Rings. Originally published by Cubicle 7 as The One Ring: Adventures over the Edge of the Wild
Only War	Fantasy Flight Games / Black Industries		2012		
Ork! The Roleplaying Game	Green Ronin Publishing		2000		
Orkworld	Wicked Press		2000		
Orpheus	White Wolf Publishing	Original World of Darkness	2003	Contemporary, Horror	Wraith: The Oblivion spinoff. Stand-alone setting, divorced from the generic World of Darkness, with a finished metaplot, published across six books.
OSRIC	Knights-n-Knaves, Black Blade Publishing and Usherwood Publishing	Advanced Dungeons & Dragons	2006, 2013		
Other Suns	Fantasy Games Unlimited		1983		
Outime	Valhalla Simulation Games		1983		
Outgunned			2024		
Over the Edge	Atlas Games	WaRP System (Wanton Role-Playing System) (custom dice pool-based)	1992, 1997, 2019	Surreal conspiracy set in the fictitious Mediterranean island of Al Amarja	Created by Jonathan Tweet with Robin D. Laws
Palladium Fantasy Role-Playing Game	Palladium Books	Megaversal	1983, 1984, 1996		
Pandemonium!	MIB Productions		1993	Roleplaying in the world of tabloid news	
Pantheon	Hogshead Publishing		2000		
Paranoia	originally by West End Games, later by Mongoose Publishing		1984, 1987, 1995, 2004, 2009, 2017	A satire of dystopian futures	Written by Greg Costikyan
Pathfinder	Paizo Publishing		2009	Fantasy role-playing game	
Pax Draconis	Technicraft Design			A detailed rules heavy space opera with a percentile system	
Passion Play	Holistic Design, Inc.		1999		
Fading Suns	Holistic Design, Inc.		1996, 1999, 2001, 2007, 2012		Live action role-playing game
Pendragon (or King Arthur Pendragon)	Chaosium	Basic Role-Playing variant	1985, 1990, 1993, 1999, 2005, 2023	Arthurian legend	Designed by Greg Stafford
A Penny for My Thoughts	Evil Hat Productions		2009		
Periphery	Epitaph Studios		1993		
Phantasia					
Phantasy Conclave	Phantasy Conclave		1984		
Phase VII	Cheshire Games		1982		
Phoenix Command	Leading Edge Games	Phoenix Command	1986		
Pirates and Plunder	Yaquinto Publications		1982		
Polaris (1997)	Halloween Concepts		1997		
Polaris	These Are Our Games		2005		
Powers and Perils	Avalon Hill		1983		
Praedor	Burger Games		2000		Based on the eponymous comics by Petri Hiltunen
The Price of Freedom	West End Games		1986	America loses the Cold War and is occupied, but resistance is in their blood	
The Primal Order	Wizards of the Coast	Capsystem	1992, 1995		
Prime Directive	Task Force Games	Custom, GURPS, d20, d20 Modern, Traveller	1993, 2002, 2005, 2008		
Primetime Adventures	Dog Eared Designs		2004		
Prince Valiant: The Story-Telling Game	Chaosium		1989		Designed by Greg Stafford, based on Hal Foster's comic strip of the same name
Privateers and Gentlemen	Fantasy Games Unlimited		1983	Naval adventure in the Napoleonic era	
Project A-ko: The Roleplaying Game	Dream Pod 9		1995		
Promethean: The Created	White Wolf Publishing	Storytelling System	2006, 2016	Chronicles of Darkness	
Proteus	Bruce Gomes Industries		1992		
Psiworld	Fantasy Games Unlimited		1984	SF adventures with a focus on psi abilities	
Puppetland	Arcane Magazine, Hogshead Publishing		1997	Horror ("a grim world of make-believe")	Written by John Scott Tynes
QAGS	Hex Entertainment		2003		
Qin: The Warring States	Cubicle 7		2007		Translated from the French publisher Le Septième Cercle's 2005 game
Queerz! TTRPG	Son of Oak		2024		
Quest	The Adventure Guild		2019		
Quest of the Ancients	Unicorn Game Publications		1982, 1988		
The Quiet Year	Buried Without Ceremony		2013, 2019		Designed by Avery Alder
Rapture: The Second Coming	Quintessential Mercy Studio		1995, 2002		By William Spencer-Hale, Quintessential Mercy
Raven Star	Raven Star Game Designs		1994		
The Realm of Yolmi	West Coast Games		1977		
Realms of the Unknown	The Walnut Group		1991		Contained in Realms of the Unknown Player's Manual and Realm Controller's Manual
Recon	Palladium Books		1982		Vietnam War adventure
Red Dragon					Japanese
Reich Star	Creative Encounters		1991	Fight Nazis in space	By Simon Bell and Ken Richardson
Rêve: the Dream Ouroboros	Nouvelles Éditions Fantastiques Malcontent Games		1985, 1993		By Denis Gerfaud (French, Rêve de Dragon)
The Riddle of Steel	Driftwood Publishing		2002		
Rifts	Palladium Games	Megaversal	1990, 2005		
Rifts Chaos Earth	Palladium Games	Megaversal	2003		
Ringworld	Chaosium	Basic Role-Playing	1984	Hard science fiction	Greg Stafford, Lynn Willis, Sandy Petersen, et al., based on Larry Niven's Ringworld novels
Risus	Cumberland Games and Diversions		1993		Designed by S. John Ross
Robot Warriors	Hero Games	Hero System	1986		
Robotech	Palladium Games	Megaversal	1986, 2008	Based on the Robotech anime television series	
Robotech: The Shadow Chronicles Role-Playing Game	Palladium Games	Megaversal	2008		
Rogue Trader	Fantasy Flight Games	Warhammer 40,000 Roleplay	2009		
RMSS (Rolemaster Fantasy Role Playing)	Iron Crown Enterprises	Fully expandable and customizable rules system	1980, 1982, 1984, 1999		
Rosenstrasse			2022		
Rune	Atlas Games		2001	Norse mythology-inspired fantasy	Written by Robin D. Laws, based on the computer game of the same name
RuneQuest	Chaosium, versions also by Avalon Hill and Mongoose Publishing	Basic Role-Playing	1978, 1979, 1984, 2006, 2010, 2012, 2018	Greg Stafford's mythical world of Glorantha	Originally designed by Steve Perrin, Ray Turney, Steve Henderson, and Warren James
RuneSlayers			1998		
Rüs			1990		
Ryuutama	Kotodama Heavy Industries		2016	Pastoral fantasy	Influenced by the animation of Hayao Miyazaki
SAGA System					
Sandman: Map of Halaal					
Savage Worlds	Pinnacle Entertainment Group		2003	Generic rule system, with supplements for fantasy, horror, pulp, science fiction, etc.	Written by Shane Lacy Hensley
Scion: Hero	White Wolf Publishing			Modern day children of the gods	
Second Dawn					
Sengoku	Gold Rush Games		1999	Historical fantasy set in feudal Japan	
The Shab-al-Hiri Roach	Bully Pulpit Games		2005	1920s academic black comedy horror	GM-less single-session game designed by Jason Morningstar
Shades of Fantasy	IDD		1992		
Shadow Lords				A world of epic heroes, immortals, titans, angels and demons.	
Shadow of the Demon Lord	Schwalb Entertainment	d20	2015	Dark fantasy, grimdark fantasy, sword and sorcery	Written by Robert J. Schwalb
The Shadow of Yesterday	CRN Games	Solar System (retroactively)	2004	Sword and Sorcery	Written by Clinton R. Nixon
Shadowdark	Arcane Library	d20	2023	Dark fantasy	An Old School Renaissance treatment of 5th edition Dungeons & Dragons, designed by Kelsey Dionne
Shadowrun	FASA/Fantasy Productions/Catalyst Game Labs		1989, 1992, 1998, 2005, 2009, 2013, 2016, 2019	Cyberpunk Fantasy	Set in the same world as Earthdawn; designed by Robert N. Charrette, Paul Hume, Tom Dowd, L. Ross Babcock III, Sam Lewis, et al.
Shard					
Shatterzone	West End Games; Precis Intermedia Gaming		1993	Science fiction, Cyberpunk	
Shock: Social Science Fiction					
Silver Age Sentinels	Guardians of Order				
Simian Conquest					
Sine Requie				Horror	Italian role-playing game
Skulduggery	Pelgrane Press		2010		Designed by Robin D. Laws
Skull and Crossbones: Roleplay on the Spanish Main	Fantasy Games Unlimited		1980		
Skyrealms of Jorune	SkyRealms Publishing, later Chessex		1984, 1985, 1992	Science fiction, Science fantasy	Written by Andrew Leker
SLA Industries	Nightfall Games	Custom	1993	Gothic, cyberpunk, dystopia, splatterpunk	
Sláine: The Roleplaying Game of Celtic Heroes	Mongoose Publishing	d20 System, Runequest	2002, 2007		Based on the 2000 AD (comics) comic book of the same name.
S/lay w/Me					
Slayers			2020		
The Slayers d20	Guardians of Order	d20 System	2003	Fantasy comedy, sword and sorcery	Based on the Slayers anime and light novel series
Sleepaway			2019		
Smallville	Margaret Weis Productions	Cortex Plus	2010	Superhero drama	Based on the Smallville television series, designed by Cam Banks
A Song of Ice and Fire Roleplaying	Green Ronin Publishing	Chronicle System	2009	High fantasy	Written by Robert J. Schwalb, designed by Schwalb, Steve Kenson, Nicole Lindroos, Chris Pramas, based on the series of the same name by George R. R. Martin
Sorcerer	Adept Press		1998, 2001	Horror, Fantasy	Written by Ron Edwards
Sovereign Stone					
Space 1889	GDW		1988, 2001, 2014	Victorian Era Sci-Fi (steampunk)	
Space Infantry	D&R Game Design		1982	Science fiction	
Space Opera	Fantasy Games Unlimited	Custom	1980	The game is based on, "the grand tradition of Space Opera, in the vein of E.E Doc Smith and ... Star Wars from George Lucas."	Based on these sources the game includes: "psionic powers so prevalent in the Lensman series and in Star Wars with 'the force.'"
Space Master	Iron Crown Enterprises	Rolemaster Fantasy Roleplaying system	1985	Science fiction	SF adaptation of Rolemaster
Space Quest	Tyr Gamemakers Ltd.		1977	Science fiction	
Spaceship Zero	Green Ronin Publishing		2002	Science fiction, Parody	
SpaceTime	Blacksburg Tactical Research Center		1988	Cyberpunk	
The Spawn of Fashan					
Spione: Story Now in Cold War Berlin	Ron Edwards		2007		
Spire: The City Must Fall	Rowan, Rook and Decard	Resistance System	2018		Designed by Grant Howitt and Chris Taylor
Spirit of the Century	Evil Hat Productions	FATE system	2006	A pulp game	Designed by Fred Hicks, Rob Donoghue, and Leonard Balsera
Splicers					
Splittermond	Uhrwerk-Verlag		2013	Lorakis	German Fantasy RPG
Spycraft	Alderac Entertainment Group			Espionage adventures	
Stalking the Night Fantastic					
Standard RPG System					
Star Ace	Pacesetter Ltd		1984	Science fiction	
Star Crossed	Bully Pulpit Games		2019	Romance	Designed by Alex Roberts
Starblazer Adventures	Cubicle 7	FATE	2008	Science fiction	Based on the Starblazer comics anthology
StarCraft Adventures	TSR, Inc.				
Star*Drive	TSR, Inc.				
Starfaring	Flying Buffalo		1976	Science fiction	
Starfinder Roleplaying Game	Paizo Publishing	d20 System	2017	Science fiction	
Starfleet Voyages	Terra Games Company	Custom	1982	Science fiction	
Star Frontiers	TSR		1982		
Stargate SG-1	AEG	Spycraft/d20 System	2003-2004		
Star Hero	Fantasy Hero	SF adaptation of Hero System	1989, 2002, 2011	Science fiction	
Star Patrol	Gamescience		1977	Science fiction	
Star Riders	Ianus Games			Parody of space opera	
Star Rovers			1981		
Stars Without Number			2010		
Starship Troopers (RPG)	Mongoose Publishing				
Starships & Spacemen	Fantasy Games Unlimited		1978		
Starstone	Northern Sages	Adaptation of D&D rules	1982	Feudal fantasy	Thinly disguised effort to create unlicensed D&D adventures
Star Trek: Adventure Gaming in the Final Frontier	Heritage Models		1978		
Star Trek: Deep Space Nine Role Playing Game	Last Unicorn		1999-2000		
Star Trek Role Playing Game	Last Unicorn		1999		
Star Trek Roleplaying Game	Decipher		2002-2005		
Star Trek: The Role Playing Game	FASA		1983-1988		
Star Wars: The Roleplaying Game	West End Games	D6 System	1987-1999		Written by Greg Costikyan
Star Wars Roleplaying Game	Fantasy Flight		2012		
Star Wars Roleplaying Game	Wizards of the Coast	d20 System	2000-2010		
Star Wreck Role-playing game	Mike Pohjola			Parody game based on the Star Wreck movie franchise	
Steve Perrin's Quest Rules			2008		Perrin's successor and alternate to his RuneQuest rules
Stormbringer	Chaosium	Basic Role-Playing	1981	Based on Michael Moorcock's Elric of Melniboné stories	
Storytelling System					
The Strange	Monte Cook Games	Cypher System	2014		
Street Fighter: The Storytelling Game	White Wolf	Storyteller System	1994	Based on martial arts videogame	It brought some rules that were later adopted in the Storytelling System, such as a single attack roll
Strontium Dog	Mongoose Publishing	Traveller	2009		
Sun & Storm	Storm Publications		1992		Core books are The Enchiridion and The Codex
Super Squadron				Super-Hero game	Australian
Supergame			1980		
Superhero 2044			1977		
Supernatural	Margaret Weis Productions	Cortex Classic	2009-2010	Based on The CW's Supernatural television series	
Supervillains	Task Force Games		1982		
Superworld	Chaosium	Basic Role-Playing	1983		
Swashbucklers of the 7 Skies			2009		
Swordbearer	Heritage Games and Fantasy Games Unlimited		1982		
Swords & Wizardry	Matthew J. Finch / Mythmere Games		2008–present	Fantasy	A "clone" of the original version of Dungeons & Dragons (distinct versions ranging from White Box covering the 1974 original to Complete covering all pre-AD&D supplements)
Sword World RPG	Group SNE	2d6 System	1989, 1996, 2008, 2018	Fantasy, set in the same universe as Record of Lodoss War	Designed by Ryo Mizuno and Miyuki Kiyomatsu, the Japanese answer to Dungeons & Dragons
Synnibarr (a.k.a. The World of Synnibarr)	Craig McCracken		1991		Notorious for a nonsensical, poorly explained game-world and huge power-levels granted to beginning player characters
Systems Failure	Palladium Books		1999		
Tales from the Floating Vagabond	Avalon Hill		1991	Comedy-fantasy	
Tales from the Loop	Free League Publishing	Year Zero Engine	2017	Alternative history science fiction	
Tales of Gargentihr	Sanctuary Games		1994		
Tales of Terror	Michael Weems Games		1991		
Talislanta	Bard Games	Omni System	1987		
TAQ	Peter's Press		1991		
Taste My Steel!	Phantasy Network		1982		
Teenage Mutant Ninja Turtles and Other Strangeness	Palladium Books	Megaversal system	1985-2000	Based on the Teenage Mutant Ninja Turtles comic books	
Teenagers from Outer Space	R. Talsorian Games		1987	Anime-based RPG	
Tékumel: Empire of the Petal Throne	Guardians of Order		2005		
Tenchi Muyo!	Guardians of Order		2000		
Ten Candles			2015		
Tenra War	Enterbrain		2007		Japanese
Tephra: The Steampunk RPG	Cracked Monocle	D12-based "Clockwork System"	2012	Steampunk, Fantasy	
Terra Incognita	Grey Ghost Press		2001		
Terra Primate	Eden Studios, Inc.	Unisystem	2002	Sci-fi, Fantasy	
Theatrix	Backstage Press		1993		
Thieves of the Tome	First Pancake Studios		2024		
Thieves' Guild	Gamelords		1980		
Thieves' World	Chaosium	multiple	1981	Sword and sorcery	Based on the Thieves' World series of novels, included statistics and gaming notes for Advanced Dungeons & Dragons, Adventures in Fantasy, Chivalry & Sorcery, DragonQuest, Dungeons & Dragons, The Fantasy Trip, RuneQuest, Traveller, and Tunnels & Trolls
Thirsty Sword Lesbians	Evil Hat Productions	Powered by the Apocalypse	2021		
Thousand Year Old Vampire		Tim Hutchings	2020		
Tibet: The Roleplaying Game	Vajra Enterprises		2004	Historical fantasy set in Tibet	
Time & Time Again	Timeline Ltd.		1984		
Time Drifters			1990		
Time Lord — Adventures through Time and Space	Virgin Publishing		1991	A Doctor Who RPG based on the 1963–89 run of the BBC television series	
TimeLords	Blacksburg Tactical Research Center		1983		
Time Master	Pacesetter Ltd; Goblinoid Games		1984; 2011		
Timeship	Yaquinto Publications; Precis Intermedia Gaming		1983		
To Challenge Tomorrow	Ragnarok Enterprises		1983		
Tokyo NOVA	Enterbrain	Playing card-based	1993	Cyberpunk	Japanese
Toon	Steve Jackson Games		1984	Cartoon adventure inspired by the classic cartoon series from Warner Brothers and MGM	Written by Greg Costikyan
Top Secret	TSR, Inc.		1980	Espionage adventures	Written by Merle M. Rasmussen
TORG	West End Games		1990	Cross-genre	Created by Greg Gorden and Bill Slavicsek
Total Eclipse RPG	Shrapnel Games		2011	By Steve N. Jackson – Smart phone optimized role playing game	
Trail of Cthulhu	Pelgrane Press	GUMSHOE System	2008	Cthulhu Mythos horror	Designed by Kenneth Hite, based on Call of Cthulhu by Sandy Petersen and Lynn Willis
Transhuman Space	Steve Jackson Games		2002		
Traveller	GDW, versions also by Imperium Games, Steve Jackson Games, Mongoose Publishing		1977	Space Opera	By Marc Miller, Frank Chadwick, John Harshman, and Loren K. Wiseman.
Traveller: 2300	Game Designers Workshop		1986	Hard science fiction	Designed by Frank Chadwick, Timothy B. Brown, Lester W. Smith, Marc W. Miller
Tri-Stat dX			2003		
Triangle Agency	Haunted Table Games		2024		
Tribe 8	Dream Pod 9		1998		
Thrilling Tales			2020	Pulp Amazing Stories	
Trinity	White Wolf Publishing	Storyteller System (1st edition), d20 System (d20 edition)	1997, 2004	Futuristic, Superhero	Designed by Andrew Bates, Ken Cliffe, Richard Dansky, Robert Hatch, Stephan Wieck, et al.
Troika!			2019		
Trollbabe	Adept Press		2002	Fantasy	Written by Ron Edwards
Trophy RPG	The Gauntlet		2022		
True20	Green Ronin Publishing	True20	2005		
Truth & Justice	Atomic Sock Monkey Press		2005		
Tunnels and Trolls	Flying Buffalo		1975	Fantasy	Designed by Ken St. Andre.
TWERPS	Lou Zocchi		1987		
Twilight 2000	GDW		1984		
Twilight Imperium: The Role-Playing Game	Fantasy Flight Games		1999		
Ultraviolet Grasslands	Exalted Funeral Press		2020		
Underground	Mayfair Games		1993		
Unisystem	Eden Studios, Inc.		2003		
Universalis	Ramshead Publishing		2002		
Universe	SPI		1981-1983		Subtitled The Role-Playing Game of the Future
Unknown Armies	Atlas Games		1998	Postmodernist-occult horror	Designed by John Scott Tynes, Greg Stolze
Usagi Yojimbo Role-Playing Game	Gold Rush Games, Sanguine Productions		1998, 2005	Fantasy Edo-period Japan	Designed by Greg Stolze (1st ed.), Jason Holmgren and Pieter van Hiel (2nd ed.), based on the comic book series of the same name by Stan Sakai
Uuhraah!	Blackhawk Games		1976	Prehistoric setting with cavemen	
Vaesen	Free League Publishing	Year Zero Engine	2020	Horror mystery monster-hunting in 19th-century Europe	Based on Vaesen: Spirits and Monsters of Scandinavian Folklore by Johan Egerkrans
Valley of the Pharaohs	Palladium Books		1983-1985		
Vampire: The Dark Ages	White Wolf Publishing	Storyteller System	1996		
Vampire: The Masquerade	White Wolf Publishing (1st, 2nd and revised editions) Onyx Path Publishing (20th anniversary edition) Modiphius Entertainment(5th edition)	Storyteller System	1991 1992 1998 2011 2018	World of Darkness	Created by Mark Rein-Hagen
Vampire: The Requiem		Storytelling System	2004		
Victorian Adventure	SKS Distribution		1983		
Victorian Age: Vampire	White Wolf	Storyteller System	2002		
Victorian Gothic	Arcanus Press	Epic Dice System	2020	Gothic Horror	A dark world of the penny dreadful
Villains and Vigilantes	Fantasy Games Unlimited, Monkey House Games		1979		
Violence	Hogshead Publishing		1999		
Visigoths vs. Mall Goths	Hit Point Press		2020, 2023	1996 Los Angeles	Designed by Lucian Kahn
Wanderhome	Possum Creek Games		2021		
Warcraft the Roleplaying Game	White Wolf Publishing		2003		Roleplaying game book based on the popular computer game by Blizzard
Warhammer 40,000 Roleplay	Games Workshop		2008		
Warhammer Fantasy Roleplay	Games Workshop		1986	Warhammer Fantasy (setting)	
Warheads: Medieval Tales	Urban Mammoth		2010		A comically based tabletop roleplaying war game
WARS Roleplaying Game	Mongoose Publishing		2005		
Waste World: Roleplaying in a Savage Future	Manticore		1997		
Wayfarers	Ye Olde Gaming Companye		2008		
Weapons of the Gods	Eos Press		2005		A wuxia-style game based on the manhua comic of the same name
Weird Wars	Pinnacle Entertainment Group	d20 System; Savage Worlds	2001		
Werewolf: The Apocalypse	White Wolf Publishing	Storyteller System	1992		
Werewolf: The Forsaken	White Wolf Publishing; Onyx Path Publishing	Storytelling System	2005		
Werewolf: The Wild West	White Wolf Publishing	Storyteller System	1997		
What Price Glory?!	John Dankert & Jim Lauffenburger; Precis Intermedia Gaming		1978		
The Wheel of Time Roleplaying Game	Last Unicorn Games	d20 System	2001	Based on The Wheel of Time novel series by author Robert Jordan	
When Worlds Collide			2010		
The Whispering Vault	Pariah Press; Ronin Publishing		1993		An RPG about god-hunting
Whitehack	WhitehackRPG (Christian Mehrstam)		2013–present	Mainly fantasy but flexible	A "reimaging" of the D&D "White Box" game with modern streamlined rules, now in its 4th edition
Wild Talents	Arc Dream Publishing		2006		
Wild West	Fantasy Games Unlimited		1981		
Witchcraft	Eden Studios, Inc.		1996		
Witch Hunt	StatCom Simulations Inc.		1983		
Witch Hunter: The Invisible World	Alligator Alley Entertainmenf		2007		
With Great Power...	Incarnadine Press				
Wizards' Realm			1981		
Wizards' World			1983		
Women are Werewolves			2022		
Woof meow (role-playing game)	Game Systems		1988		
World Action And Adventure			1985		
World of Darkness (original) and the World of Darkness (new) "2.0"	White Wolf Publishing		1991		Product line
The World of Indiana Jones	West End Games		1994		
World of Synnibarr	WonderWorld Press		1993		
World Tree	Padwolf Publishing		2001		Roleplaying in a high-magic, highly civilized world populated by many sentient species, none of them human
World Wide Wrestling RPG			2015		
Worlds Beyond	Other World Games; Precis Intermedia Gaming		1990		
Worlds of Wonder	Chaosium	Basic Role-Playing	1982	Fantasy, superhero, and science fiction settings	Designed by Steve Perrin, Steve Henderson, Gordon Monson, Greg Stafford, Lynn Willis
Wraith: The Great War			1999		
Wraith: The Oblivion		Original World of Darkness	1994		
Year of the Phoenix	Fantasy Games Unlimited		1986		
Ysgarth	Ragnarok Games		1979		Written by Timothy Willard
The Zorcerer of Zo	Atomic Sock Monkey Press		2006	Fairy tales	
Zweihänder	Grim & Perilous Studios		2017		Written by Daniel Fox, who first described it as a "Warhammer Fantasy Roleplay retroclone"
Paranormal Order RPG	Jambô Editora		2022	Urban Fantasy	Written by Cellbit, Felipe Della Corte, Guilherme Svaldi, Pedro Coimbra e Silvia Sala

== See also ==
- List of play-by-mail games
- List of role-playing game designers, annotated with a few significant games to which each designer has contributed.
- List of role-playing game publishers
- List of game manufacturers
- Timeline of tabletop role-playing games
- History of role-playing games
- List of role-playing video games
