= Age of Ruin (role-playing game) =

1990 role-playing game

Age of Ruin is a post-apocalyptic role-playing game (RPG) published by Cutting Edge Games in 1990.

== Description ==
=== Setting ===
This RPG is set in the year 2060, after a plague has killed 80% of the world's population. The plague and severe climate change have caused the survivors to mutate, knowledge of the past has been reduced to word-of-mouth, and the latest generation (the player characters) have no idea of what the world was like in the 20th century.

=== Character generation ===
The player allocates 425 points between eight attributes: Charisma, Dexterity, Endurance, Intelligence, Luck, Mind Strength, Quickness, and Strength. The player then gives their character a mutation with both a benefit and a significant drawback. A character with a large enough Mind Strength may be given psionic abilities, each of which comes with a randomly chosen Mental Malady such as a phobia or mania.

From a list of 16 Primary Skills, the player chooses eight, and then chooses five related Secondary Skills.

=== Adventures ===
The core book included an introductory scenario. Cutting Edge did not publish any stand-alone adventures.

== Publication history ==
The chief designer of Age of Ruin was Clay Gibson, with additional material by Joe Fenicle, Jarett Hendricks, Mike Kennison, Frank Russell, and Brian Schrunk, and artwork by Joe Fenicle, Chuck Matheny, and Terell Thomas. The 160-page softcover book was published by Cutting Edge Games in 1990.

Cutting Edge released one resource for this game system, a 96-page softcover campaign setting called Realm of the Beast, also published in 1990.

== Reception ==
Stewart Wieck reviewed the product in the August/September 1990 issue of White Wolf Magazine. He stated that "'Age of Ruin' is a fine game, but it offers little that cannot be found elsewhere. The rules are nicely organized and the interior (artwork included) is attractive. Don't let the cover painting scare you away, because the game is at least worth a look."

In Issue #52 of Challenge, Steve Maggi scorned the crude cover art, commenting, "This game easily ranks as the worst in appearance of those I've seen. The cover picture is atrocious and the choice of colors yields a garish, unprofessional presentation." He was also not impressed by the varying quality of the interior art, nor the layout, which he called "uninspired." However, once he began to read the content, he found a lot to praise. "The combat system is quick and easy, as are skills, psionics and character generation." He concluded, "All in all, I would recommend this game [...] try to look past the art and review it as a fun, easy, post-holocaust-genre game you can play the same day you get it."
