= A Land Once Magic =

A Land Once Magic is a 2026 role-playing game published by moreblueberries.

== Gameplay ==
A Land Once Magic is a game in which a collaborative post‑fantasy worldbuilder has players use cards and conversation to imagine strange, transformed realms that break away from traditional fantasy into wildly original settings.

== Reception ==
Cameron Kunzelman for The A.V. Club reviewed A Land Once Magic said that "The game thinks very clearly about its off ramps, and it also includes a series of exploratory tables that prompt players into thinking about the internal logics of their world; it's not hard to see that accruing into adventure hooks for later RPG play, or even building onto preexisting campaigns."

A Land Once Magic was nominated for "Best Rules" for the 2026 ENNIE Awards.
