= Total Eclipse (role-playing game) =

2011 tabletop role-playing game

- Designers: Steve N. Jackson
- Publishers: Shrapnel Games
- Publication: 2011
- Genres: Role-playing

Total Eclipse is a generic tabletop role-playing game (RPG) created by Disrupted Gears and published in 2011 by Shrapnel Games.

== Description ==
Total Eclipse is a generic role-playing game adaptable to any fantasy, science fiction or other type of campaign setting. The game originally came with a fantasy setting on the world of Virdea.

The game rules and background are outlined in a series of books:

- Total Eclipse Standard Manual is an 87-page core rulebook that describes skills resolution and combat. Special combat rules cover being bound, blinded, comatose, cursed, deafened, diseased, distracted, hobbled, knocked back, knocked down, pinned, poisoned, and stunned.
- Adventurer's Forge is a 357-page book that deals with character generation that is classless and skill-based. Characters can be from a number of races including human, undead Forlorn, fairy-like Hada, reptilian Haguni, or wolf-like Woldurno.
- Virdean Gazetteer is a 229-page book detailing the fantasy world of Virdea that includes treasure tables, magical items, a bestiary, a starting town and some sample adventures.

Digitally Downloaded noted that the books were digital and "are especially designed for smart phones and tablets, but they will also be readable from eReaders such as the Nook or Kindle, or even the PC."

== Publication history ==
Total Eclipse was developed by Steve N. Jackson (no relation to either the American game designer or the British game designer) in the 1980s and 90s. In 2011, Disrupted Gears distilled the game system and campaign world into three books, and indie game publisher Shrapnel Games agreed to develop and publish the game. Shrapnel subsequently sought out playtesters before releasing the game in 2011.

Although the game system was independent of the campaign world of Virdea, and Shrapnel indicated that other campaign settings would be forthcoming, no other material for Total Eclipse was published.
