= TAQ (role-playing game) =

TAQ is a 1991 role-playing game published by Peter's Press.

== Gameplay ==
TAQ is a game in which combat, character generation, spells, monsters and skills are included in the rules system.

== Reception ==
Stewart Wieck reviewed TAQ in White Wolf #28 (Aug./Sept., 1991), rating it a 1 out of 5 and stated that "Even though the game is cheap for a roleplaying game [...] I recommend that you introduce new roleplayers to the hobby with a more complete game system."
