= Michtim: Fluffy Adventures =

Tabletop role-playing game

- Cover
- Designers: Georg Mir
- Publishers: GrimOgre Laboratory
- Publication: 2012
- Genres: Tabletop role-playing game, storytelling game
- Website: www.michtim.com

Michtim: Fluffy Adventures is a pen & paper storytelling game that was created by Georg Mir in 2012 and published by GrimOgre Laboratory. The game has a strong focus on streamlined game design, ethics and inclusiveness in its game setting.

In Michtim: Fluffy Adventures, the players portray eponymous creatures called Michtim that are most easily described as anthropomorphized hamsters with some features of cats, rabbits or rodents. These characters have a thriving society that places an emphasis on equality and diversity in many aspects. Fur colors, different (often fluid) gender identities, pansexuality and polyamory (nests as families) all are explored, as well as showing that different body types are welcome and accepted.

== Game mechanics and play ==
The game uses a couple of six-sided dice, which are rolled and added together. If the sum exceeds 7 the roll was a basic success. To increase the effect, players have to set aside dice before rolling, making success less likely but worth more. This way, players can decide for themselves whether they want to play with risk or stay on the safe side.

The game also uses a unique system in place of the common attributes of roleplaying games. Instead it focuses on emotions. Emotions range from Anger, Joy, Grief, Fear to Joy. Each emotion is associated with in-game actions. The attributes therefore define the character's role as possible healer, scout or damage dealer. Michtim: Fluffy Adventures also uses the concept of mood markers. These simulate that the hero is getting in a mood which affects their actions significantly. There are game mechanics in place to affect the moods of others, so the story always takes an emotional approach, which is very different from other games.

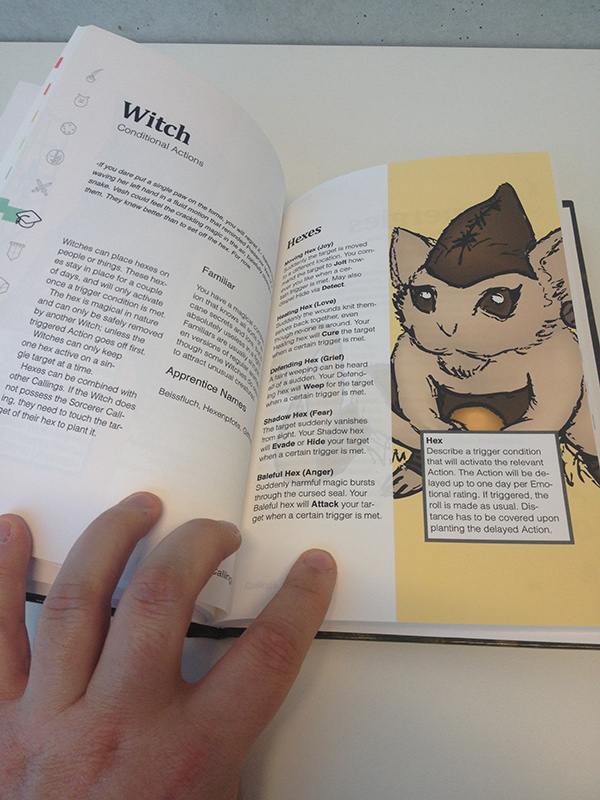
"Michtim: Fluffy Adventures", rule book, 2012

== Creature definition and behavior ==
Callings are the classes of Michtim. They are often reduced to a single mechanic that can be combined by activating multiple Callings. This is much like multi-classing in other games, but built from the ground up to encourage players to find new synergies with existing material. Another important aspect of this system is that all attributes are useful to every Calling, whereas in other games only some attributes are relevant to a single class. There can be angry sorcerers (as damage dealers), caring sorcerers (as healers) or afraid sorcerers (as scouts). Even if one Calling is used by two members of the group their personalities (emotion attributes) will change how they use them.

The game puts an emphasis on non-violent solutions. The game's three factions all value a different virtue.

- Haus Barsik strives for Conservancy of nature, protecting the wilds.
- Haus Grauling values Culture as exemplified by progress, industriousness, ingenuity.
- Haus Turnaya favors Charity like caring for others and nonviolence.

Factions can have conflicts based on their values (like placing an emphasis on progress, but exploiting nature) and are encouraged to sort things out diplomatically. Players will often come into conflict with humanity's interference. Michtims live secluded from modern humanity, but often have to defend their woods covertly, sometimes by sabotaging human projects.

== Game world and narrative ==
The game is a modern fantasy game. Technology exists in Michtim culture, up to the point of having drones and augmented Michtim heroes called Cybertooth. Magic exists as well, humans are just not used to seeing it. Michtims are protected by the magic power of the Veil which ensures that they remain somewhat hidden from human eyes. Humans only see them as mere hamsters.

Mir refers to Michtim's overall narrative genre as hamsterpunk (thus creating a whimsical new derivative of cyberpunk).

== Development history ==
The first installment of the game was created by Mir as the practical part of his master thesis at FH Joanneum (University of Applied Sciences), supported by his thesis advisor Johannes Grenzfurthner.

== Awards and nominations ==
In October 2015, Michtim: Fluffy Adventures was nominated for a World Experience Award and ranked in close second place, at World Usability Congress 2015 in Graz.

== Critical reception ==
Wyatt Salazar of Critical Hits says "Michtim: Fluffy Adventures will delight any gamer who is a fan of simple, narrative-focused games, who wants something quick and different to play, or for fans of cute, cuddly animals." Dominic Claveau writes: "In a nutshell, what I discovered with Michtim is that beyond all the cuteness, there was a game that had a great level of complexity without being hard to learn and manipulate. It's also a game that empowers the users and gives them all they need to make this little universe into something special and unique for each gaming group." Samuel Van Der Wall of RPG Alchemy writes: "The two things that strike me as remarkable about the game are its uniqueness and the fact that it was essentially created by one person. The quality of the product is extremely high for a solo venture and the creator came up with an incredibly unique setting that contains unique, but relatively simple, game mechanics." Nenad Ristic summarizes that "the game feels a bit like a European Saturday Morning cartoon, complete with an emphasis on conservation". Mark Knights says that Michtim "promotes a message of equality between beings" and calls it "a beautiful family game".
