= Time Drifters =

1990 role-playing game

Time Drifters is a 1990 role-playing game published by Dimensional Strategies.

== Gameplay ==
Time Drifters is a game in which time-traveling player characters start in the Wild West era.

== Reception ==
Christopher Earley reviewed Time Drifters RPG in White Wolf #30 (Feb., 1992), rating it a 1 out of 5 and stated that "Time travel lore may be coming in a future supplement, but with such a first impression, further purchases are unjustified. Steer clear."
