= Shard (role-playing game) =

Fantasy role-playing game

- Designers: Aaron de Orive & Scott Jones / Shard Studios
- Publishers: Studio 2 Publishing
- Publication: 2009
- Genres: anthropomorphic, fantasy
- Systems: d6 dice
- Website: ShardRPG

Shard by Shard Studios is an anthropomorphic heroic fantasy role-playing game set in Dárdünah, a secondary world fantasy setting that is influenced by Indian culture.

== Setting ==
=== Geography ===
The game takes place on Dárdünah, a planet inhabited by a number of anthropomorphic races with many different animal abilities such as Natural Weaponry, Flight, Venom, Thermal Sensing or Nightvision. Metal deposits are mostly absent from this world, existing only in trace quantities and most objects are instead constructed using crystals and other materials.

The setting substitutes many ordinary animals with exotic insectoid counterparts, called Suthra and many other alien creatures. There is also many examples of strange and dangerous plant life. The societies and culture of Dárdünah have largely been inspired by Indian culture. There are many kingdoms with different types of regimes, such as the Amín, Khanate and Principalities. Most societies of Dárdünah follow a caste-system.

== Game System ==
Shard uses a comparably simple D6 based role-playing system which features about 37 Animal Abilities, 20 talents and 100 different skills with countless of specializations. Combat in Shard can be performed with many different types of skills including untrained brawling, martial arts and various weapons. The magic in Dárdünah includes four types of ritual, including Healing, Dreamwalking, Endowment, and Summoning.

== Reception ==
In a review of Shard in Black Gate, Andrew Zimmerman Jones said "For a good Game Master with a good group looking for a new adventure, Shard provides excellent opportunities for adventures that aren’t just rehashing old stories, but are creating something fundamentally new. The game is versatile, so about anything goes." RPGnet gave the game a mostly positive review, describing the mechanics as "reasonably light, traditional, straightforward", but criticizing the setting for a lack of detail.

== See also ==
- Ironclaw
- World Tree
