= Noir: the Film Noir Role-Playing Game =

- Author: Jason Inglert, Jack Norris, Curtis Werner
- Publisher: Archon Gaming
- Publication date: 1996
- ISBN: 1-889864-00-5

Noir: the Film Noir Role-Playing Game is a 1996 role-playing game published by Archon Gaming.

== Gameplay ==
Noir: the Film Noir Role-Playing Game is a game in which the style of film noir is emulated. The game leans heavily into ambiance: a perpetual twilight city drenched in rain and ambiguity, populated by morally gray characters—like the bus driver moonlighting for the mob to fund his children's education. The character creation process emphasizes narrative over mechanics, urging players to build backstories and motivations before selecting abilities or traits. This approach aligns with the game's freeform storytelling ethos, where players are active co-narrators alongside the Director. Sample scenarios—ranging from recovering a stolen jewelry box to helping a dying man relive his final days—are offered more as tonal sketches than cohesive campaign structures. The rules system itself features skill checks using six-sided dice, but the combat system is calculation-heavy.

== Reception ==
Paul Pettengale reviewed Noir: the Film Noir Role-Playing Gam for Arcane magazine, rating it a 6 out of 10 overall, and stated that " While the ideas behind Noir are completely solid, and there's some fantastic background material on which to base games, it's extremely hard for both the referee and the players alike to make a decent game out of it - it lacks campaign rationale and explanation of what it's supposed to play like. With the right referee and players, it could be incredible."

== Reviews ==
- Backstab #3
- Pyramid (Issue 27 - Sep 1997)
