= Night of the Ninja (role-playing game) =

Tabletop role-playing game

- Designers: Tom Wall, Sandford Tuey
- Publishers: IIE Games Corporation
- Publication: 1986; 39 years ago
- Genres: Role-playing game (RPG)

Night of the Ninja is a role-playing game published by IIE Games Corporation (Canada) in 1986.

== Description ==
Night of the Ninja is a modern system of oriental martial arts. The simple rules cover character creation, skills, weapons, running the games, etc., but the main emphasis is on combat, featuring unusual weapons such as scythes, whips, spikes, and blowpipes.

== Publication history ==
Night of the Ninja was designed by Tom Wall and Sandford Tuey and published by IIE Games Corporation in 1986 as a 54-page book.

== Reception ==
Stewart Wieck reviewed the product in the December 1986 to January 1987 issue of White Wolf. He rated it 3 points of 10 for Complexity, 7 points for Appearance, 8 points for Contents, and 9 points for Playability. He rated it overall at 8 points of 10.
