= Ehdrigohr =

Tabletop role-playing game

Cover art by Valerie Xanos

Ehdrigohr: The Roleplaying Game is an indie role-playing game released by the indie publisher Council of Fools in 2012 in which players are members of nine indigenous tribes coexisting with spirits and other forces around them.

== Description ==
Ehdrigohr is a fantasy role-playing game where each of the nine tribes of the game represent a real-world tribal culture. Most of them are Native American such as Lakota, Cheyenne, and Aztec, but some cultures outside of North America such as Bedouin and Celt are also present. A great war has just ended in a stalemate, and powerful magics are still present, as well as terrible creatures of the night. The game is an indigenous world without colonizers, where each tribe must find a path in the world.

Although two character classes, the Solitary and the Thief, resemble the classic Dungeons & Dragons classes of solitary fighter and thief, others in this game are designed to serve their communities in various ways. The Dove Society protects the community from undead, the Society of Crows protects the community from the forces of darkness, the Jays attempt to unite the tribes; other professions like guards and traders can also be played as members that serve the community. An important objective is for the tribe to survive the long, dark winters of this world.

The game uses the FATE 3.0 rule system.

== Publication history ==
Allen Turner, who is Black, Lakota, and Irish, designed Ehdrigohr as a "survival horror game", and it was published in 2012 by indie publisher Council of Fools as a 350-page book with cover art by Valerie Xanos, and interior art by Jordan Cuffie, Ruth Harvey-Turner, John Wesley O'Seadna, Eric Ridgeway, Greg Taylor, and Anna Todaro, and cartography by Robert Altbauer.

== Reception ==
Writing for Boing Boing, Daniel Starkey commented, "Designed over the course of several years by black, American Indian game designer Allen Turner, Ehdrigohr filters Dungeons and Dragons-style roleplaying experiences through a distinctly Native cultural lens rather than a European one." Starkey called it "an incredibly broad and flexible game, one where you can create almost any character imaginable, or even choose to play without any combat at all. You won't need a vast array of multifaceted dice in order to play, and where Dungeons and Dragons has very exact and specific rules about how far you can move each turn or how many items your character can carry, Ehdrigohr lets you do whatever seems reasonable." Starkey concluded, "Ehdrigohr is already more to me than just a fun game; it's a chance to use a game in the same way that storytellers used the fables that inspired it—to teach, to connect, and to love."

Emilee Guevara, writing for The Link, noted, "The game requires introspection and improvisation from participants, where players are required to create new identities and make decisions on how to deal with conflict ... Consistent with many Indigenous traditions, an acute awareness of one’s narrative is vital for surviving the game." Guevara concluded, "By exemplifying the power of the imagination and the potential of innovative game designs, Ehdrigohr makes the impossibility of decolonized realities possible."

In his 2023 book Monsters, Aliens, and Holes in the Ground, RPG historian Stu Horvath compared the game to others that have used indigenous culture such as Deadlands and Shadowrun, especially their use of the Ghost Dance, saying, "In both those games, the Ghost Dance is a plot device, deployed to cataclysmically change the colonizers and land-stealers' way of life by reintroducing magic to the world ... These sorts of portrayals of indigenous cultures seem like ill-informed caricatures when they're lined up with the tribal groups seeking harmony and strong community in Ehdrigohr." Horvath concluded, "It's a game of hope."
