= Mechanical Men =

Mechanical Men is a 1985 role-playing game published by Cliff Hanger Games.

== Gameplay ==
Mechanical Men is a game in which sentient robots battle for dominance across a devastated post‑apocalyptic Earth.

== Reviews ==
- Abyss #46 (Summer, 1990)
