= The Last Exodus =

The Last Exodus is a 2000 role-playing game published by Synister Creative Systems.

== Gameplay ==
The Last Exodus is a game in which the world as it was ended in the year 2000, as thousands of people rose to fill the role of Messiah or Antichrist to lead the survivors.

== Reviews ==
- Pyramid
- Backstab
- Anduin (Issue 86 - Feb 2004) Untote
