= Realms of the Unknown Player's Manual =

Realms of the Unknown Player's Manual is a 1991 role-playing supplement for Realms of the Unknown published by The Walnut Group.

== Contents ==
Realms of the Unknown Player's Manual is a supplement in which the players create characters who lead entire civilizations.

== Reception ==
Stewart Wieck reviewed Player's Manual in White Wolf #32 (July/Aug., 1992), rating it a 4 out of 5 and stated that "The publisher obviously priced the Player's Manual [...] to encourage every player to purchase it. There's not a lot in the book's 24 pages, but at that price why not take the advice of the publisher?"

== Reviews ==
- Shadis #11
