= Phase VII =

Role-playing game

Phase VII is a role-playing game published by Cheshire Games in 1982.

== Description ==
Phase VII is a science-fantasy system set on a vast damaged space station. The PC's fight monsters and collect treasure, trying to increase in power to reach "Phase VII." The game includes a solo scenario.

== Publication history ==
Phase VII was designed by Dennis Drew II, and published by Cheshire Games in 1982 as a 16-page book, a 6-page pamphlet, a map, a T-shirt iron-on, dice, and a plastic pouch.

== Reception ==
J. David George reviewed Phase VII in The Space Gamer No. 57. George commented that "Phase VII is one of the weakest efforts on the role-playing market today. From a complete lack of playtesting to shoddy production, the game and its [...] pricetag can only be considered a very bad joke."

Lawrence Schick in his book Heroic Worlds called the game "Eccentric".
