= Wizards' Realm =

Tabletop role-playing game

Wizards Realm A Fantasy Role-Playing System
- Designers: Cheryl W. Duval; Niels Erickson; William G. Murphy; Clifford Polite
- Publishers: Mystic Swamp Studio
- Publication: 1981
- Genres: Fantasy
- Systems: Custom (1d6, 2d10 or 1d20, and 1d100)

Wizards' Realm is a role-playing game published by Mystic Swamp in 1981.

== Description ==
Wizards' Realm is a fantasy system with a simplified, back-to-basics approach. Character creation employs a class-and-level system; classes include wizards, spellcasters, knights, and anti-paladins. The combat system is quite simple. The book includes maps, a sample town, an errata, and an introductory scenario.

== Publication history ==
Wizards' Realm was designed by Cheryl W. Duval, Neils Erickson, Clifford Polite, and William G. Murphy, and published by Mystic Swamp in 1981 as a 64-page book with a map. The ring binder edition was published in 1983.

== Reception ==
Ronald Pehr reviewed Wizard's Realm in The Space Gamer No. 53. Pehr commented that "Wizard's Realm can provide FRPG adventures in a satisfactory manner, but is not so fascinating, original, and detailed that people will abandon other games to come flocking. However, the price is right and someone shopping for a present for a neophyte FRPG devotee-to-be could do a whole lot worse."

C. D. Martin reviewed Wizards' Realm for Different Worlds magazine and stated that "Wizard's Realm suffers from a lack of development. The designers knew how they wanted the game to play, so it always worked for them. They didn't consider the problems outsiders would have with this game."

Lester W. Smith reviewed Wizard's Realm, Ringbinder Edition in The Space Gamer No. 75. Smith commented that "I recommend the Wizard's Realm Ringbinder Edition for anyone interested in fantasy roleplaying. It contains everything needed for a campaign, and is worth considerably more than its price".

== Reviews ==
- Nexus (Issue 2 - Jun 1982)
