= Mythworld =

Tabletop role-playing game

Mythworld is a role-playing game published by Hippogriff Publications in 1986.

== Description ==
Mythworld is a fantasy role-playing system with rules describing the real medieval world with some magic. The boxed set includes the Rules, Bestiary, Outfitter, Skills, Spells, and Robber's Cave books, each of which was also sold separately.

== Publication history ==
Mythworld was designed by Paul Cardwell, Jr., and published by Hippogriff Publications in 1986 as a boxed set containing a 112-page book, a 96-page book, a 68-page book, a 52-page book, a 28-page book, and a 12-page book, five character sheets, and dice.
