= Necronautilus =

Role-playing game

- Cover art by Shel Kahn
- Designers: Adam Vass
- Illustrators: Shel Kahn, Adam Vass
- Publishers: World Champ Game Co.
- Publication: 2020

Necronautilus is a role-playing game created and illustrated by Adam Vass and released by the indie publisher World Champ Game Co. in 2020 in which characters are sentient clouds who go on quests to enforce the will of the god of Death.

== Description ==
Necronautilus is a game of the Old School Renaissance movement, which seeks to emulate the minimal rules and imaginative play style of the earliest role-playing games of the 1970s.

=== Setting ===
The game is set in a dimension ruled by the blind god Death, where all creatures who have died now reside. Players take the roles of Death Agents, formerly living beings who now are embodied as sentient clouds of gas under the command of Death itself. They roam the Death dimension in a nautilus ship as they perform missions for Death. A character cannot remember its former life or how it died, only how it became a Death Agent. Being clouds of gas, characters cannot wield tools or equipment, but must manifest action through Words of Power. Each character starts with three Words, and can collect up to nine more—called the Collection—as the storyline progresses.

=== Action resolution ===
Each time a character wishes to take an action, it uses one of its Words of Power. Each word starts with a value of 6, and to use it successfully, the player must roll two 6-sided dice and get a total less than the current value of the Word.

If the action is successful, the power materializes in the way the player wishes. As GM historian Stu Horvath noted, "Thus 'Fire' can start one, burn the flesh, inflame the heart, discharge a gun, or manifest four building-sized letters; so long as there is some connection between the Word and the effect, no matter how tenuous, it happens." The definition of the Word, and even its spelling and symbology, are up to the player. As Michael Barnes pointed out, "Words of Power take on different meanings, interpretations, spellings, or signification based on what a player does with them—it is all about subjectivity and generating a bespoke semiology at the gaming table." Successive uses of the Word exhausts its power. When this happens, the character can turn the Word into a Memory, revealing something of the character's former life. The player can also activate a Word from the character's Collection to replace the lost Word.

If the action is unsuccessful—the player rolled more than the Word's value—no manifestation of Power appears, and the Word itself is changed by the addition of affixes, letters or complete words, making the Word more specific and thus less useful. However, the Word's value increases by one, increasing the chances of successfully using it.

If the player rolls the Word's value, the gamemaster relates the effect that happens, and the Word fractures in two, making a new Word of Power, and a new Word for the character's Collection.

=== Returning to Life ===
When a character accumulates 30 points of Life from Memories, the character remembers its former existence and is restored to Life and removed from the dimension of Death (and from the game).

== Publication history ==
Adam Vass, the bassist for the post-hardcore band La Dispute, created the concept and interior art for Necronautilus and used Kickstarter to crowdsource enough money for its publication. The resultant 80-page hardcover book with cover art by Shel Kahn was published by indie publisher World Champ Game Co. in 2020. This was followed by several supplements, including NecroNautlius Expanded Content (2020), DEATH! (2020) and The Atlas of Dead Stars (2021).

== Reception ==
Michael Barnes, writing for There Will Be Games, was very impressed by the depth of this game, commenting, "The scope of this game is mindboggling beyond the rules. It's a game about language and communication that actually uses word jumbles as a mechanism, but more significantly it's about the subjectivity of what things mean, of how things exist." After reading the book, Barnes noted, "It felt dangerous and wild. I felt challenged by it and as a GM, it's an understatement to say that it left me amazed and bewildered." Barnes called this "a demanding game for the players and the GM", saying, "It requires a huge amount of buy-in on the part of the players ... to engage in the game's surrealism and far-reaching ambition and it needs a GM that will make the most of the focus on subjective meanings." Barnes concluded by giving this game a rating of 5 out of 5, saying, "It's beautiful and daunting. I love this game for that. I love that reading this book feels like boundaries are being torn open and beyond them is that infinite 'post-life' universe where anything is possible."

In his 2023 book Monsters, Aliens, and Holes in the Ground, RPG historian Stu Horvath stated, "Necronautilus is World Champ Game Co.'s wildest ride yet. It stands at the edge of something: An abyss? A frontier? An expanse of limitless potential? An unknown future? It's difficult to know for sure." Horvath talked about the use of language as a tool, saying, "A bit like Dialect, Necronautilus scratches at the way players communicate and the slippery dynamic nature of meaning—for words and for people, too; after all, the Death Agents are searching for their personal meanings, too."
