= The Confederate Rangers =

Tabletop role-playing game

The Confederate Rangers is a role-playing game published by SoLar-Way Games in 1989.

== Description ==
The Confederate Rangers is a near-future science fiction system set in an alternate America where the government is so corrupt that 13 southern states secede and form a new Confederacy. The heroes are Confederate Rangers, high-tech lawmen with old-time values.

== Publication history ==
The Confederate Rangers was published by SoLar-Way Games in 1989.
