= Cassiopean Empire =

1982 role-playing game

Cassiopean Empire is a role-playing game published by Norton Games in 1982.

== Description ==
Cassiopean Empire is a science-fiction space-adventure system, with rules for character creation, spaceships, star systems, aliens, robots, and a description of the interstellar Empire.

== Publication history ==
Cassiopean Empire was designed by Raymond Norton, and published by Norton Games in 1982 as a 16-page book with a character record sheet. The game included art by F.Scott McKown.

== Reception ==
Allen Varney reviewed the 1985 release of Advanced Cassiopeian Empire in Space Gamer No. 76. Varney commented that "There's so much wrong with this game that I can't even find the parts that are right . . . assuming there are any. Such searching doesn't seem worth the effort."

Lawrence Schick called this game "Amateurish", and noted that the character creation rules were similar to Traveller.
