= Waste World: Roleplaying in a Savage Future =

1997 role-playing game

Waste World: Roleplaying in a Savage Future is a role-playing game published by Manticore Productions Limited in 1997.

== Contents ==
Waste World is a post-apocalyptic science fiction role-playing game where the remaining humans struggle to survive.

== Reviews ==
- Envoyer
- Backstab #4
- Ringbote (Issue 13 - Jul/Aug 1997)
- Casus Belli #106
