= Shades of Fantasy =

Shades of Fantasy is a 1992 role-playing game published by IDD.

== Contents ==
Shades of Fantasy is a supplement in which the setting is the high-fantasy world of Enzopea.

== Reception ==
Denys Backriges reviewed Shades of Fantasy in White Wolf #38 (1993), rating it a 2 out of 5 and stated that "If you have a few extra dollars and want to add new ideas to spice up your campaign, buy a better-developed high-fantasy setting such as Talislanta. Using SOF on its own or as supplemental material is not recommended."
