= Second Dawn =

Tabletop role-playing game

Second Dawn is a role-playing game published by rba Enterprises in 1988.

== Description ==
Second Dawn is a fantasy system that embraces both magic and scientific technology. The game includes almost 50 character classes, combat rules, a magic system with over 800 spells, and 400 monsters.

== Publication history ==
Second Dawn was designed by Arthur Wiederhold with George J. Herget, and published by rba Enterprises in 1988 as a 108-page book.
