= Attack of the Humans =

Tabletop role-playing game

Attack of the Humans is a role-playing game published by Rapport Games in 1990.

== Description ==
Attack of the Humans is a violent and humorous game, a "B monster-movie" system. The simple rules include only three character attributes (Brains, Fitness, and Common Sense), each of which is the prime requisite for one of three character classes (Braniacs, Athletes, and Typical Persons). Each class gets a certain number of skill points, which are used to buy skills, the base scores of which are linked to the three attributes. There are brief skill descriptions and guidelines for running the game, but the core of the rules is its list of "Common Monsters," including alien brain men, animated apparel, blind telepathic albino city gators, evil stuffed toys, disembodied body parts, floating bottled brains, and possessed household pets.

== Publication history ==
Attack of the Humans was designed by David Durham, with concept and art by Phil Morrissey, and published by Rapport Games in 1990 as a 96-page book.

== Reviews ==
- Voyages to the Worlds of SF Gaming (Issue 14 - Jan 1991)
