= Dungeon Squad =

Dungeon Squad is a fantasy role-playing game by Jason Morningstar. It is released as being 'by Jason Morningstar', rather than through Bully Pulpit Games as other of Morningstar's games have been.

== Justification ==
The stated intention of the game is to provide a set of rules suitable for introducing teenagers to role-playing. Morningstar writes that it is "designed expressly for young players with short attention spans who demand action and fun" .

== System ==
The game is designed to be extremely simple. Each character has five dice, each with a different number of sides: a d4, d6, d8, d10, and d12. The other die commonly used in role-playing games, the twenty-sided die or d20, is not used in the original rules of Dungeon Squad.

The d4, d8 and d12 are assigned to three 'aspects' of the character - Wizard, Warrior, and Explorer. Higher dice indicate a greater level of skill in that area. For example a character with a d4 in Warrior, a d8 in Explorer, and a d12 in Wizard would be unusually skilled in magic, but unusually unskilled in physical combat.

The Wizard die is used to cast spells, and the Warrior die to hit in combat. The Explorer die is used "to sneak around and be a thief". Tasks which are mentioned in the original rules as using the Explorer dice are moving silently, picking locks, climbing walls, disarming traps, and jumping chasms .

The d6 and d10 are each assigned to spells, weapons, shields or armour. Characters who don't assign any dice to a hand-to-hand weapon may assume that they have a hand-to-hand weapon with a d4 assigned to it (or that their fists are the equivalent of such a weapon). However a similar rule does not hold for spells, shields, or armour. Characters who don't assign a die to a particular spell have no ability to cast that spell, and characters who don't assign a die to armour or a shield are assumed to not have one.

Characters also randomly generate a starting amount of gold, and may exchange this gold for various equipment, and later for greater advantages such as new spells.

The main mechanism of the game is that characters roll the dice assigned to one of the three 'aspects', and succeed if they roll equal to or over a pre-determined number. The rules give the target number for several different tasks - always 2, 4 or 6.

If a character succeeds, they might then roll the d6 or d10 to determine the degree of success. For example, if a character succeeds in wounding an adversary by rolling their Warrior dice, they would then roll the d6 or d10 assigned to their weapon to determine how severe the wound was. Armour and shields have the opposite effect to weapons - that is, they reduce the damage suffered by the character.

== Variants ==
A number of variants have been written, some of which are listed in the 'External links' section below.

== License ==
The game is released under a Creative Commons 'Attribution-NonCommercial-ShareAlike 2.5' license . This means that the game may be freely downloaded, distributed, and modified, provided credit is given, the project is non-commercial, and that modified works are distributed under the same or a similar license .

== Publication history ==
Shannon Appelcline noted that Jason Morningstar frequently participated in game design contests and submitted several games in 2005. These included Dungeon Squad, which he wrote as "a 24-hour RPG after trying to run D&D 3.5 for a group of teens". Appelcline also described that although Bully Pulpit games did not have any new releases in 2007 and 2008,

Morningstar had a new publication from an unlikely source: his old "Dungeon Squad" game was printed in a Spanish newspaper (2009) in Mexicali, Baja California — where it went out to 10,000 readers. A few years later, Dungeon Squad would also be published in Czech (2011) — not bad for a contest entry that Morningstar had released into the Creative Commons.
