= Leystorm: The Dominion =

Leystorm: The Dominion is a 1996 role-playing game published by RoleFile Games.

== Gameplay ==
Leystorm: The Dominion is a game in which a science fiction setting features rebellious resistance, imperial oppression, and shadowy mysticism, and blends space opera, cyberpunk flair, and mystical intrigue into a compact rulebook. Its mechanics involve an intuitive system based on "Dice Levels," where attributes and skills are reduced to simple die rolls, encouraging flexible task resolution and tolerating missteps even from expert characters. The book outlines a backdrop of interstellar tension: the Dominion holds sway, and player characters are positioned against its reach, entangled in guild rivalries, spiritual dichotomies (Light vs. Dark Aether), and sprawling political factions.

== Publication history ==
Leystorm: The Dominion was the inaugural title from RoleFile Games.

Traxsis Volume 1 was also published as a supplement.

== Reception ==
Zy Nicholson reviewed Leystorm: The Dominion for Arcane magazine, rating it a 5 out of 10 overall, and stated that "Ultimately, accepting the Leystorm milieu feels a little bit like reading fan fiction. It's competent enough on the whole, with a few capital ideas, but you do have to tolerate some amateurish execution and the occasional 'hnnngh!'-eliciting transgression that makes you wonder if you couldn't write better yourself. An even mixture of good and bad."
