= Ghoulash: The Last Game on Earth =

Paper-based game

Ghoulash: The Last Game on Earth is a paper-based game that bills itself as "a fast-paced action-adventure game for two players, played entirely on paper, using specially designed charts."

Ghoulash is, at its heart, a scaled-down role-playing game, or RPG, mimicking the mechanics of a typical RPG in that each player serves as the game master for the other, hiding obstacles and items to be discovered. Its simple hide-and-seek game mechanics more closely resemble that of the schoolroom game Battleship: One player describes a move; the opponent describes the consequences of that move.

The game uses a back-story mythology to support the game-pack scenarios and has received favorable reviews at BoardGameGeek and Joystiq.

== History ==
The first version of Ghoulash was published in 1982 by creator Mike Suchcicki, who was attempting to create a dungeon-crawl-type RPG for two players. Originally it was going to have a post-apocalyptic setting, with the players battling zombies, packs of vicious dogs and bands of ruthless scavengers. In his notes for the game, Suchcicki had written the word "ghoulish." When he looked back at his notes later, he read the word as "ghoulash," a pun that inspired him to change the monsters of the game from zombies to Ghouls — large, green, soulless monsters — and to give the game a new name. The original version was played using a variety of charts, printed on letter-size paper; no dice, spinners or playing pieces of any kind were required. Each player used two City Charts — a grid representing an urban landscape with several buildings — and a Tally Chart, used to keep track of supplies, ammunition, wounds and Ghouls killed. The game was self-published, as a packet of pre-printed charts packaged in a simple white envelope with the logo and description printed in black ink.

The game was marketed through adventure gaming magazines of the day and through local game stores. A favorable review appeared in the now-defunct Adventure Gaming magazine.

After selling only about a dozen copies, including some to a game enthusiast in Australia, Suchcicki put Ghoulash aside, hoping one day to refine the game into a version that was both faster to play and also would allow for a more practical marketing plan. In the late '90s, he returned to the game, working on more streamlined designs of the grids and quicker game mechanics. In his redesign, he made two significant changes to the game: One, he fit two player grids, Ghoul battle graphics, wound meters and instructions all on one page; two, he designed the game in a series of scenarios, each with its own grid and victory conditions. For instance, in the scenario "Gun Shy," the players begin the game without a weapon, and must find it as they travel the grid. In "Immunity," players can use talismans to avoid obstacles.

To test the viability of the game, Suchcicki decided to give away his early scenarios for free. In 2001 he launched Ghoulash.com, a site from which players, after registering, could download free PDFs of the dozen or so scenarios available. Players were asked to indicate their countries of origin. Based on the registration records, within months hundreds of players from all over the world had downloaded the scenarios. Fans of the game eventually translated Ghoulash into six different languages: French, Italian, Russian, Hungarian, Spanish and Catalan.

== Reviews ==
- Adventure Gaming #13
