= Raven Star =

Roleplaying game

Raven Star is a 1994 role-playing game published by Raven Star Game Designs.

== Gameplay ==
Raven Star is a game in which the inhabitants of Planet C93 have been invaded and now work the mines in the nearby asteroids to find the metal known as Nor-X.

== Reception ==
Thomas Riccardi reviewed Raven Star in White Wolf Inphobia #54 (April, 1995), rating it a 3.5 out of 5 and stated that "This game is a worthwhile addition to any collection. My only complaint is that it leaves me wanting for more. [The price] is also a bit steep for a 196-page book. However, if you're willing to take a chance on a new game, pick up Raven Star."

== Reviews ==
- Shadis #17
