= Rüs =

Rüs is a 1990 role-playing game published by Rus Games.

== Gameplay ==
Rüs is a game in which the Russia of modern-day has been taken back to a mythical version of 900 AD.

== Reception ==
Stewart Wieck reviewed Rus RPG in White Wolf #30 (Feb., 1992), rating it a 2 out of 5 and stated that "There are smaller marks against Rus [...] but the RPG's final and largest flaw lies in pricing. Yes, the maker is based in Australia, but for the look and feel of this game, it would have to be much closer to state-of-the-art to justify the asking price."

== Reviews ==
- Abyss Quarterly #50 (Winter, 1992)
