= Adventure! (1985 game) =

Tabletop role-playing game of 1985

Adventure! is a role-playing game designed and published by Tori Bergquist in 1985.

== Description ==
Adventure! is a universal system.

== Publication history ==
Adventure! was designed and published by Tori Bergquist in 1985 as a 48-page book.
