= Metascape (role-playing game) =

1993 game by The Game Lords

Metascape is a 1993 role-playing game published by The Game Lords.

== Contents ==
Metascape is a game in which the human space alliance known as the Guild interacts with galactic empires in the distant future.

== Reception ==
Ken Carpenter reviewed Metascape in White Wolf #40 (1994), rating it a 3 out of 5 and stated that "The Metascape boxed set includes four rule manuals, an adventure ('Shakna - Assault on the Hive'), a complete set of dice, six metal figures and a sheet of card counters. You really don't need anything else to play, but you shouldn't after laying down [the money]."

== Reviews ==
- Dragon #203
- Science Fiction Age
