= Outime =

Tabletop science fiction role-playing game

Outime, subtitled "a role playing game of alternate times", is a role-playing game published by Valhalla Simulation Games in 1983.

== Description ==
Outime is a time-travel system with adventures on alternate Earths. The rules cover skills, combat, psionics, equipment, and a sample miniscenario.

== Publication history ==
Outime was designed by Marc W. D. Tyrrell, and published by Valhalla Simulation Games in 1983 as a 16-page book with an outer folder.
