= Proteus (role-playing game) =

Proteus is a 1992 role-playing game published by Bruce Gomes Industries.

== Contents ==
Proteus is a game in which a fantasy role-playing game includes influences from the Middle East as well as East Asia.

== Reception ==
Denys Bakriges reviewed Proteus in White Wolf #39 (1994), rating it a 2.5 out of 5 and stated that "The price of the game is a bit steep for the amount of material presented, but Proteus offers quite a bit of potential for both players and gamemasters."
