= Whitehack =

Tabletop role-playing game

Whitehack is a (mainly fantasy) tabletop role-playing game created Christian Mehrstam, a Swedish literary scholar at University of Gothenburg. It is part of the Old School Renaissance (or "OSR") movement within the wider role-playing scene.

== Description ==
It was first published in 2013 as a booklet. A second edition (2015) and third edition (2021) were followed by the current fourth edition in 2023. The latter editions have been available also as hardcover versions, including "notebook" versions that incorporate a large number of lightly-formatted empty pages for the referee's notes.

Whitehack takes inspiration from the original edition of Dungeons & Dragons but implements a streamlined "roll-under" mechanics using (mainly) the d20 and d6 dice. There is more emphasis on co-operative rulings emerging from player-referee negotiations than in typical role-playing game rules. The rules also replace the traditional D&D character classes with three broader and more generic classes, which can be customised by features from free-form "group memberships". The magic system in Whitehack also differs from that of D&D, but still relies on pre-memorised "slots". The rules are however designed to allow the use of gaming materials designed for most derivatives of the original Dungeons & Dragons versions to be used with minimal conversion. The Whitehack rules have had influence on other role-playing game rules, in particular within the OSR movement.

Despite the fantasy-centric inspiration, the rules system is designed to be flexible and could easily support other genres with some adaptation by the referee. The second edition included also a brief summary of an arctic fantasy setting ("White Curse") with short introductory adventures. These were removed from the later editions and are slated to appear in separate publication later.

Whitehack was received positively in blog and YouTube reviews, specifically the magick / miracle system.
