= Woof Meow =

1988 role-playing game

Woof Meow is a role-playing game published by Game Systems, Inc. in 1988.

== Description ==
Woof Meow is a fantasy system in which the PCs are real-world cats and dogs. Players play cats and dogs in a human-controlled society, with genuine cat and dog abilities, and also a magic system. The rules include character creation, skills, magic, fighting, running the game, adventure ideas, and a sample scenario.

== Publication history ==
Woof Meow was designed by Ulrico Font and John Williford, with a cover by Guy Gondron, and published by Game Systems, Inc. in 1988 as a 96-page book.

== Reception ==
Lawrence Schick called the game system "Unusual", noting of the designers that "They're serious about this, honest." He also pointed out that the GM is called the "Kennel Master", and most of the magic spells have humorous names like "Dog Gone".
