= Simian Conquest =

Tabletop role-playing game

Simian Conquest is a role-playing game published by Avant-Garde Simulations Perspectives in 1978.

== Description ==
Simian Conquest is a science fiction role-playing system. The brief rules cover ape, human, mutant, and astronaut characters as well as combat and campaigning in the world of the Apes.

== Publication history ==
Simian Conquest was designed by Marshall Rose and Norman Knight, and published by Avant-Garde Simulations Perspectives (ASP) in 1978 as a 32-page digest-sized book. Gamescience had planned to re-release this as "Gorilla Warfare", but never published it.

== Reception ==
Lawrence Schick noted that the game was "inspired by the Planet of the Apes series".
