= Earth 2020 =

Earth 2020 is a 1983 role-playing game published by Stephen Kyffin.

== Contents ==
Earth 2020 is game set in the then-future of 2020. Technology has allowed everyone to live lives of leisure, but some people — the player characters — seek adventure. Designer Stephen Kyffin designed the game as "an optimistic view of the future, with more technology and human understanding of ourselves and the planet we live on."

The book is divided into four sections:

1. Introduction of life in 2020, and includes notes on leisure, the military, space and undersea cities.
2. Character generation includes over 160 possible professions, and equipment that can be purchased.
3. Skills resolution, with a list of more than 50 skills.
4. Combat resolution.

== Publication history ==
Stephen Kyffin of Newquay self-published Book 1 of the game as a 44-page booklet with a price of £2. More volumes were promised, but ultimately no more books appeared.

== Reception ==
Andy Blakeman, writing in Issue 11 of Imagine, felt that similarities could be drawn to Traveller, and there were also some errors in equipment pricing, but concluded, "Really, this game is hard to criticise [...] I feel that I can recommend this game system to many gamers, whatever style of play they prefer, as a good system for role-playing. Full marks!"
