= Neighborhood (role-playing game) =

Tabletop role-playing game

Neighborhood is a role-playing game published by Wheaton Publications in 1982.

== Description ==
Neighborhood is a childhood system (i.e., a game about being a kid). It consists of the everyday struggles of children in suburban neighbourhoods.

== Publication history ==
Neighborhood was published by Wheaton Publications in 1982.
