= Phantasy Conclave =

Tabletop fantasy role-playing game

Phantasy Conclave is a role-playing game setting published by Phantasy Conclave in 1984.

== Description ==
The fantasy role-playing game rules of Phantasy Conclave, a class-and-level system derived from D&D/AD&D, were first developed at a gaming club, the Phantasy Conclave. The setting of the system is a world called Arth, where a cataclysm of magic has changed the world and resulted in two new races (avian aerlings and sea-dwelling meren) in addition to the five standard fantasy role-playing races (humans, halflings, dwarves, elves, gnomes).

The game components of the boxed set are: three 20-page rulebooks, an 8-page Gamemaster Guide, an errata sheet of Player's Notes, and an assortment of ten dice.

== Reception ==
In the June 1984 edition of Dragon (Issue #86), Steve List found the rules lacked details about Arth and its inhabitants, only included three brief scenarios for game play, and had very "sketchy" rules for combat and magic spells: "This is definitely not a game for the GM who is reluctant to roll up his sleeves and work at or experiment with the system." For what was included, List found the game overpriced, and could not recommend it, concluding, "The game, to the extent that it has been developed, has some interesting ideas, but so little of the necessary supporting detail has been delineated that the game cannot really compare to other products of this type on the market. Phantasy Conclave is overpriced for what it supplies, so buyers should not casually purchase it."
