= The Realm of Yolmi =

Tabletop role-playing game

The Realm of Yolmi is a role-playing game published by West Coast Games in 1977.

== Description ==
The Realm of Yolmi is a science-fiction system with class-and-level rules that covers human characters on a future Earth (soldiers, cyborgs, scientists, and psychics), their skills, experience, equipment, et al. Combat includes both futuristic weaponry and unarmed fighting. The background material covers space travel, galactic trade, alien races (including the evil Yolmi), over 140 creatures, plus starship statistics and combat rules. Character class chosen dictates what skills are available. The game includes combat rules, equipment, and five levels of psionic abilities.

The Realm of Yolmi takes place on a future Earth after a great catastrophe that turned humans more barbaric, and caused animals to mutate, while automatons are allowed to roam. A popular news commentator discovered a form of immortality using drugs and began the religious sect called the Undead of Yolmi (Cronk).

== Publication history ==
The Realm of Yolmi was designed by Ken Black and Marshall Rose, and published by West Coast Games in 1977 as a 116-page book. The book is A4 size and neatly bound in a spiral plastic binder. The second edition was published by Avant-Garde Simulations Perspectives (ASP) in 1978 as a 180-page book.

== Reception ==
The Realm of Yolmi was reviewed by Don Turnbull in White Dwarf #10 (December 1978-January 1979), who gave the book a rating of 2 out of 10, and called the game "in effect, technological D&D". He complained of the game's humor: "The rules are peppered with attempts at humour and what are obviously 'in-jokes.' I wasn't particularly amused, but other readers may find it funnier than I did." He added: "This attempt at light banter rather spoiled the rules for me, though they appear to be complete and comprehensive if you can stomach the unnecessary attempts at wit." Turnbull did note the similarities to the contemporarily-released Gamma World, and suggested that "adherents of that game may find some useful hints within Yolmi".

Dana Holm reviewed The Realm of Yolmi in The Space Gamer No. 21. Holm commented that "Outside of a few nice touches that any new game will have, my impression is that this game is a deliberate spoof on Dungeons & Dragons."

Lawrence Schick felt that the class-and-level system was derived from Dungeons & Dragons, and commented: "What a title - Realm of Yolmi - just kind of rolls right off the tongue, doesn't it?"
