= Morpheus (role-playing game) =

1990 multi-genre role-playing game

Morpheus is a multi-genre role-playing game published by Rapport Games in 1990 that takes place in a virtual reality machine, enabling adventures to be in any fantasy, historical or science fiction setting.

== Description ==
Morpheus is a multi-genre system set in the future, when player characters participate in a virtual-reality system, the Mindgamer's Organization for Recreational Programs Harnessed by Electroencephalic Utility Systems (MORPHEUS) that enables the gamemaster to set the game in virtually any background or setting.

Players start by creating a character, which can be one of three classes:

- Alterationist: Can transform and mutate at will.
- Invocationist: A healer who can also alter reality.
- Gadgeteer: Can create any type of mechanical device.

Characters have the attributes Imagination, Confidence, Ego and Reputation, and players can use a pool of Dream Points to buy special talents.

Each character also receives a Feat Roll rating in order to do any task, but the rules are ambiguous as to how this works.

The game includes four players' aid sheets: a character record sheet, character attack powers sheet, character defense powers sheet, and "cheat sheet" summary for quick character creation.

== Publication history ==
Morpheus was published by Rapport Games in 1990 as a book with four sheets.

== Reception ==
In his 1990 book The Complete Guide to Role-Playing Games, game critic Rick Swan questioned the ambiguity of the rules, a problem that he thought "plagues Morpheus throughout. Are there any limits to the types of weapons the Gadgeteer can create? What exactly is the function of Confidence? Do all of the dream creatures respond to a PC's Reputation in the same way? It's anybody's guess." Swan concluded by giving the game a poor rating of only 2 out 4, saying "Morpheus bursts with inventive ideas, but it'll take a determined referee to shape them into a coherent playable game."

== Other reviews and commentary ==
- Voyages to the Worlds of SF Gaming (Issue 12 - Oct 1990)
