= Tales of Terror (role-playing game) =

Tales of Terror is a 1991 role-playing game published by Michael Weems Games.

== Gameplay ==
Tales of Terror is a game in which the theme is B-movies and slasher films.

== Reviews ==
- Abyss Quarterly #50 (Winter, 1992)
