= The Official Superhero Adventure Game =

Tabletop role-playing game

The Official Superhero Adventure Game is a role-playing game published by its designer Brian Phillips in 1981.

== Description ==
The Official Superhero Adventure Game is a superhero system with rules mainly for combat (basic and advanced). The game includes dozens of hero and villain character descriptions. A calculator is required, as math formulas figure prominently in the rules.

== Publication history ==
The Official Superhero Adventure Game was designed and published by Brian Phillips in 1981 as a 52-page book with a blue and white cover, and 32 cardstock sheets. A second version was published the same year with a color cover.

== Reception ==
Steve Perrin reviewed The Official Superhero Adventure Game for Different Worlds magazine and stated that "All in all, you get quite a bit for your money, even without the ability to make up your own characters. The characters provided are interesting in themselves, and the scenarios make for a good reproduction of a DC saga, if not a Marvel epic. For character and scenario ideas alone, superhero referees might do well to pick up this game, if they can find it."

Lawrence Schick felt that the game system's rules were "confused" and "rudimentary".
