= Afterwars =

1991 role-playing game

Afterwars is a 1991 role-playing game published by Stellar Games.

== Gameplay ==
Afterwars is a role-playing game set after World War III.

== Reception ==
Christopher Earley reviewed Afterwars Complete Roleplaying Game in White Wolf #33 (Sept./Oct., 1992), rating it a 2 out of 5 and stated that "Despite the mistake of putting combat complications into a system geared toward simple-rule, on-the-fly players, and the generic feel due to a lack of campaign background (an equipment list is not background), I wouldn't write off Afterwars yet."

== Reviews ==
- Voyages to the Worlds of SF Gaming (Issue 16 - 1991)
