= Field Guide to Encounters =

Tabletop role-playing game

Field Guide to Encounters is a role-playing game published by Judges Guild in 1982.

== Description ==
Field Guide to Encounters is a science-fantasy system with Dungeons & Dragons-like character classes and skill levels. The game includes 34 occupations, rules for mutations, lycanthropy, psionics, "manitou combat," and character godhood, plus over 600 monsters.

== Publication history ==
Field Guide to Encounters was designed by Dragon's Byte, and published by Judges Guild in 1982 as a 112-page book and a 96-page book.

== Reception ==
J. David George reviewed Field Guide to Encounters in The Space Gamer No. 55. George commented that "Experienced gamers should avoid this product. Intermediate gamers should avoid this product. Novice gamers should avoid this product. Paper recyclers should look into Field Guide very seriously."

Lawrence Schick called the game "Dumb" and commented: "Inexplicably, one group of monsters are giant animated breakfast foods: friend eggs, bowls of oatmeal, toast, burnt toast (higher armor class than regular toast), etc. You figure it out."
