= Dračí doupě =

Tabletop role-playing game

- Cover
- Designers: Martin Klíma
- Publishers: ALTAR
- Publication: 1990 (1st edition); 2004 (plus edition); 2011 (2nd edition)
- Genres: Fantasy
- Systems: Custom

Dračí doupě (literally translated: Dragon's Den) is a popular Czech role-playing game, very loosely based on Dungeons & Dragons. It was created by the publishing company ALTAR.

== Rules ==
Each player plays typically one character (warrior, ranger, wizard etc.), except for one player - the gamemaster (called Pán jeskyně in Czech, which can be translated literally as Lord of the cavern or more freely as dungeon master). They prepare a map and then describe to the players what their characters see and hear. The players say what the characters do and the gamemaster says what was the result of their actions.

There are rules for most actions (fighting with monsters, spellcasting, buying equipment, opening a chest with an arrow trap, speed of a movement, point of tiredness, trying to frighten an enemy to run away etc.), but the characters can try to do anything, even if it is not described in the rules. The Lord of the cavern uses his fantasy to determine what happens.

== Races ==
Each player chooses one of seven playable races. Some races or creatures in DRD are different from DnD for several reasons: the translating process, folk tales already present and another base of literature available in past.

- Hobbit - smaller than human, similar to the race in The Lord of the Rings
- Kudůk – special humanoid race. Name „kudůk“ (in original as Holbytla), written correctly "kudúk“, can be found in J.R.R.Tolkien, where it is used in their own language as a label for Hobbits. "Kudůk"s in DrD were created as interspecies between dwarves and hobbits.
- Dwarf
- Elf
- Human
- Barbar – humans living in wild far away from civilization. Separation changed them: they are stronger and more resistant, but less agile and charismatic than other humans.
- Kroll – basic traits are strong muscles, high growth (over 2 m), fierce and warlike character and low intelligence. They have a rough tough grayish skin and its appearance reminiscent of prehistoric man. Striking are the big ears they use in ultrasounds echolocation like bats. Their low intelligence brings up a variety of jokes (some Dungeon Masters determine the number of words, which Kroll knows, etc.)

== Profession ==
Each player chooses one of five professions. On a higher level every character has to choose one of two possible specializations for his profession. The professions and specializations are:.

- Warrior - a strong person with fighting abilities
  - Fighter - a powerful hero, strong especially against giant animals
  - Fencer - strong against humanoids
- Ranger - also strong in battles, but with abilities like healing, speaking to animals, tracing other beings etc.
  - Strider - strong in fighting and finding information (inspired by Aragorn)
  - Druid - a forest spellcaster
- Sorcerer - weakest in fight, but able to cast spells
  - Wizard - practical magic of all kinds, inventing new spells
  - Mage - mental magic, understanding the "fundamental conflict" of the world (between good and evil etc.)
- Alchemist - able to prepare magical potions, explosives, poisons, enchanted weapons etc.
  - Theurg - contact with astral spheres, casting elementals, enchanted weapons etc.
  - Pyrofor - magical potions, flying torpedoes, rockets, poisons
- Thief - able to move unseen, convince people, climb walls etc.
  - Robber - noteless in a crowd, good at knife throwing and martial arts, estimating a value of a jewel etc.
  - Sicco - estimating intentions of people, building a "net" (organized band)
