= Tales of Gargentihr =

- Publisher: Sanctuary Games
- Publication date: 1994

Tales of Gargentihr is a 1994 role-playing game published by Sanctuary Games.

== Gameplay ==
Tales of Gargentihr is a game in which players explore the surreal world of Gargentihr—a planet powered by mystical Sa-energy, where massive continents drift atop oceans of silt. The setting blends the arcane and the industrial, with steam engines, rock-pipes, and printing presses emerging as the old magical traditions fade. The continent of Agasha serves as the primary setting, populated by diverse alien races and shaped by the colonial expansion of the Karro, a human faction imposing their authoritarian religion on the native Ha'esh. Cities evoke a fusion of grime and futurism, while the countryside teems with enigmatic Kyashi spirits and otherworldly fauna. Players assume the roles of members of the Clondis, a secret society navigating this volatile landscape.

== Publication history ==
Tales of Gargentihr was written by Richard Cooper and Alistair Cowan and was the first product published by Scottish-based company Sanctuary Games.

== Reception ==
Pyramid magazine reviewed Tales of Gargentihr and stated that "Sometimes a game comes along which has such a weird and wonderful background that your jaw drops when you read it. And you devour it from cover to cover and then think, 'Well, that was amazing but . . . what do I do now?' Tales of Gargentihr does not suffer from this. By the time I'd read my way through the 350 pages, I had an entire campaign planned out in my head — enough to keep my gaming group going for at least a year. This game is dripping with ideas."

== Reviews ==
- Dragon #232
- Australian Realms #24
- Casus Belli #88
