= With Great Power... =

Tabletop role-playing game

- Designers: Michael S. Miller
- Publishers: Incarnadine Press
- Genres: Superhero
- Systems: Custom

With Great Power... is a Silver Age superhero tabletop role-playing game by Michael S. Miller, independently published by Incarnadine Press. Its title comes from the oft-repeated line from Spider-Man's debut in Amazing Fantasy #15, "...with great power there must also come -- great responsibility."

The rules of the game are designed to encourage players to think in terms of what would benefit the story, rather than doing what would benefit the character. As such, "suffering" can aid a character by granting mechanical bonuses, such as putting more cards into the player's hand.

== Structure of play ==
Like most RPGs, With Great Power... has a gamemaster who will play the villains and decide on the order of scenes. Unlike in many RPGs, the gamemaster has no special referee function. The other players each create a superhero to play. Both heroes and villains are described through free-form traits, called Aspects.

During play the so-called Suffering of the various Aspects will increase and decrease. The gamemaster tries to increase the Suffering on the heroes' traits so that the villains can take control of the Aspects. The players will try to bring Suffering to the villains' aspects, in order to thwart their plans.

To increase tension, the accumulation of Suffering starts an inverted death spiral. That means that suffering Aspects become more powerful. The participants must therefore find a balance between protecting their Aspects and increasing their chances for success.

Play takes the form of a story arc that includes a certain number of villains and their respective plans. Each story arc is divided into five acts, each containing several scenes of play, with differing overall rules. The villains are stronger in the first act, but the heroes become stronger in the later acts. This is modeled after the dramatic structure of comic books. The villains' plans cannot be completed or averted before act five.

Scenes of play fall into two categories: "enrichment scenes", focusing on character development, and "conflict scenes", focusing on clashes between heroes and villains, or amongst the heroes themselves. The outcome of scenes is settled with standard playing cards.

Enrichment scenes "belong" to individual characters and players, though these can invite other players to participate in the scene, either as their character playing different non player characters. The hosting player has final say on what goes on in the scene, except that each scene will feature a conflict, with the stakes of each side defined by the hosting player and by their opposition, respectively. A player's opposition is the gamemaster, the gamemaster's is the players. Conflict scenes, on the other hand, is not the province of any one participant. One character "picks a fight" with another character, after which each player not already engaged in a conflict has a chance of picking a fight. A fight is between two characters only. If a character is engaged in combat with more than one opponent, he will have one separate "page of conflict" for each player. For each page of conflict, each player defines a set of stakes. The battle ends when one character is unable to best his opponents assault.
