= Crime Fighter =

Tabletop role-playing game

- Publishers: Task Force Games
- Publication: 1988; 38 years ago
- Genres: TV cop show Crime-fighting
- Chance: Dice rolling

Crime Fighter is a role-playing game published by Task Force Games in 1988 that is based on popular television "cop shows" of the 1960s such as Dragnet and Adam-12.

== Description ==
Crime Fighter is a "TV cop show" role-playing system, in which players play police officers. The game is map-oriented, with counters to move around to indicate positions of cars and characters. The game comes with five cardstock floor-plan sheets and two introductory scenarios.

=== Character creation ===
Each character has six attributes common to many role-playing games of the time: Strength, Dexterity, Constitution, Intelligence, Willpower, and Charisma. These have either positive or negative values, each of which has an effect on particular skills.

=== Activity resolution ===
Players check success for an activity by rolling three six-sided dice, adding or subtracting the relevant character attribute, then comparing it to a difficulty level assigned to the task. Any roll above 11 is automatically successful.

The rulebook includes rules for character creation, movement, and combat, and a "Sourcebook" section giving background on police procedures and running a campaign.

== Publication history ==
Crime Fighter was designed by Aaron Allston, and published by Task Force Games in 1988 as a boxed set containing a 64-page book, a contents sheet, six cardstock sheets, a map, two cardboard counter sheets, and dice.

== Reception ==
In his 1990 book The Complete Guide to Role-Playing Games, game critic Rick Swan called this game "a superb simulation of television cop shows ... a slick clever design by Aaron Allston that perfectly captures the campy tone of its source material." Swan concluded by giving the game an excellent rating of 3.5 out of 4, saying, "Fresh, imaginative, and fun. Crimefighter is the best game of its type."
