= Taste My Steel! =

Tabletop role-playing game

Taste My Steel! is a role-playing game published by Phantasy Network in 1982.

== Description ==
Taste My Steel! is a historical system of the swashbuckling era. The game includes rules for swordplay and swordsmanship, firearms, brawling, and creating scenarios and campaigns.

== Publication history ==
Taste My Steel! was designed by Don Johnson, and published by Phantasy Network in 1982 as a 56-page book.
