= QAGS =

Tabletop role-playing game supplement

- QAGS introductory boxed set
- Designers: Steve Johnson & Leighton Connor
- Publishers: Hex Entertainment
- Publication: 2003
- Genres: generic role-playing game system
- Systems: QAGS

QAGS (Quick Ass Game System) is a generic tabletop role-playing game. Setting for this system have varied and ranged widely.

== History ==
In 1998, three gamers (Steve Johnson, Leighton Connor, and Dale French) published the First Edition of the game after a year of development. Since then, QAGS (pronounced "kwags") has been updated with a Second Edition, and the publisher, Hex Games, has continued to release games.

To date, Hex Games has used the core system for M-Force: Monster Hunting In The 21st Century, Rasslin’, Qerth, The Adventures Of Sindbad, Rocket Jocks, Weird Times At Charles Fort High, Funkadelic Frankenstein on the Mean Streets of Monstertown, "Hobomancer", "Edison Force", and "The Pytheas Club", as well as several stand alone adventures such as Deep Space Rescue and The Dungeon Of Moderate Annoyance (Not Nearly So Bad As The Dungeon Of Infinite Pain).

In 2001, Hex Games was the Gaming Guest of Honor at Marcon 36. In 2006, Hex was the "Gaming Guest" of Honor at Archon 30.

== Game mechanics ==
In QAGS, player characters are defined by six Words. Body, Brain, and Nerve represent the character's physical, "intellectual" and mental (willpower and social skills, for example) abilities. Job, Gimmick and Weakness represent what the character does, what makes him unique in the world, and what limits him in a grand Shakespearean way. These last three Words are qualified. A character's Job might be “Animal Control Officer”, his Gimmick “Hide In Plain Sight”, and his Weakness “Dies if touches peanut butter”. Each of these six Words is assigned a Number ranging from 6 to 16. Skills, areas of knowledge that round out the character, with Numbers ranging from +1 to +5 are also assigned, and they will be used to modify target numbers when rolls are called for. Numbers are generated by using either the Qik Start system that relies on dice-rolling, or the Point Built system in which the player is given a certain number of points with which to create the character.

Player characters are further fleshed out by assigning them a Tag Line (something that the character routinely says, such as “Jinkies, a Clue!”), WWPHITM (Who Will Play Him/Her In The Movie), and any number of Dumb Facts.

When the Game Master determines that a character's action goes beyond what would be considered normal or everyday, she decides what Word is applicable and use that Word's Number as the target number. If no Word is applicable, the GM will use half the player's Body, Brain or Nerve Number rounded down as a default target number. Any Skill modifiers are added to determine the modified target number. Then she asks the player to roll a 20-sided die; no other dice are required to play QAGS. The number rolled on the die is then compared to the modified target "number" assigned to the appropriate Word. If the roll is under the modified target number, the action succeeds; over the modified target number, a failure. If two characters are in opposition, hand-to-hand combat for example, then the higher successful role is the one that actually succeeds.

In an example of play, a PC, Rollo the Superspy, wants to impress Isvestia, a beautiful Ruritanian counterintelligence agent, at the casino in Monte Carlo. He adds his +2 skill in “Tango Dancing” to the 12 of his “Superspy” Job, which she will oppose with her 15 Nerve. He rolls a 13 while she rolls a 4. Both are "successful", but his roll, being higher, is the one that succeeds. The result should be that he has her eating out of his hand, but Rollo also has “Overplays His Hand” for a Weakness with a Number of 13. He rolls a 9, and the Weakness wins and takes effect, thus releasing Isvestia from her fascination.

Simple dice-rolling is augmented by the use of Yum Yums. Yum Yums are anything compact and edible, anything from hard candies to potato chips. Yum Yums may be used to buy automatic successes, chances to re-roll failed rolls, and to modify things like damage given and taken. They also give players a chance to take control of a game and determine details about the game world. Additional Yum Yums are handed out for advancing the plot, role-playing well, or making the GM snort lemonade out her nose.

In the play example of Rollo the Superspy (eyeballing Isvestia across the ballroom floor), he can throw the GM a Yum Yum instead of rolling dice, granting him an automatic success in his attempt to impress Isvestia. The GM again invokes his weakness, but Rollo can throw another Yum Yum to avoid having his Weakness take effect. Now Isvestia's ready to tell him "anything".

== Complexity ==
QAGS can be as complex or as simple as the GM and players want it to be, and the rules can be easily adapted to include whatever mechanic a new setting might require. For example, Rasslin’ needed to add a mechanic for resolving the showy combat of professional wrestling; Rocket Jocks needed rules for spaceship combat; and Weird Times at Charles Fort High needed an alternative point-build character generation system to balance the different paranormal characters.

== Reviews ==
- Pyramid
