= Uuhraah! =

Tabletop role-playing game

Uuhraah! is a role-playing game published by Blackhawk Games in 1976.

== Description ==
Uuhraah! is a prehistoric system of cavemen vs. dinosaurs, consisting mainly of simple combat rules.

== Publication history ==
Uuhraah! was designed by Bob King, with art by Greg Bell, and published by Blackhawk Games in 1976 as a 12-page digest-sized book.

== Reception ==
Lawrence Schick described the game as "Crude but enthusiastic."
