= The Castle Perilous =

Tabletop fantasy role-playing game

Cover of the game

The Castle Perilous is a role-playing game published by West Wind Simulations in 1980.

== Description ==
The Castle Perilous is a fantasy system designed to emphasize the storytelling aspect of role-playing. It includes nine loosely structured character classes, with guidelines on how the GM and player can work together to define an individualized character. The rules cover how acting and enthusiasm on the part of the players affects resolution of play. The game includes an introductory scenario.

== Publication history ==
The Castle Perilous was designed by James T. Sheldon, and published by West Wind Simulations in 1980 as a 72-page book, with five reference sheets. The second edition was published in 1981 as a boxed set containing a 72-page book, five reference sheets, and five metal miniatures.

Acquired by Precis Intermedia in 2024, a classic reprint of the game is available.

== Reception ==
Ronald Pehr reviewed The Castle Perilous in The Space Gamer No. 47. Pehr commented that "The Castle Perilous has much to recommend it. You get an interesting set of rules for a low price. But most people will not enjoy the vague descriptions meant to encourage imagination, or the requirements to memorize spell descriptions. There's potential here, FRPG referees can get valuable ideas, but the average gamers will probably be happier with other products."
