= Midnight at the Well of Souls Role-Playing System =

1985 science fiction tabletop role-playing game

- Cover art by H.R. Van Dongen
- Publishers: TAG Industries
- Publication: 1985; 40 years ago
- Genres: Role-playing game

Midnight at the Well of Souls Role-Playing System is a science fiction role-playing game published by TAG Industries in 1985 that is based on the "Well of Souls" novels by Jack L. Chalker.

== Description ==
Midnight at the Well of Souls attempts to recreate the setting of the novels by Jack L. Chalker. The game book covers 150 character races, a combat system, starship blueprints, and space combat rules, plus an introductory scenario. The game includes a partial map of the vast Well World, where each terrain hex simulates the conditions on a different alien planet.

== Publication history ==
Midnight at the Well of Souls Role-Playing System was designed by Timothy A. Green, and published by TAG Industries in 1985 as a boxed set with cover art by H.R. Van Dongen that contained a 112-page book, a map, and dice.

== Reception ==
Bob Kindel reviewed Midnight at the Well of Souls for Different Worlds magazine and stated that "I n brief, the game system is coherent, playable, and enjoyable. The material presented is well-organized and indexed. The editing could have been better - an entire section was left out of the book - but the errata are included in the package and can readily be inserted into the book. The illustrations are clear and the play aids useful."

In Issue 83 of White Dwarf (November 1986), Phil Frances commented, ""I endeavoured to like this game. Honest. I looked for nice things to say about it, but I couldn't really find any. I can see the intentions behind it, and the designer ought to be commended for his perseverance - few people could ever manage anything like this without being a professional games company. The box makes it sound all very wonderful, but it doesn't seem to amount to much when you've read it - a sort of third-rate Ringworld, actually. Worth buying if you're a rabid Chalker fan, hopelessly rich, or 90% insane."

In his 1990 book The Complete Guide to Role-Playing Games, game critic Rick Swan advised even fans of the Jack Chalker novels to avoid this game. "The premise has a lot of potential .... but the game doesn't do much with it." Swan also found "The game mechanics are unimaginative and superficial." Swan concluded by giving the game a poor rating of only 1.5 out of 4.
