= ACE Agents! =

1992 tabletop role-playing game

ACE Agents! is a 1992 role-playing game published by Stellar Games.

== Gameplay ==
ACE Agents! is a game in which secret agents work for the Alpha Commandoes Echelon (A.C.E.).

== Reception ==
Christopher Earley reviewed ACE Agents! in White Wolf #35 (March/April, 1993), rating it a 4 out of 5 and stated that "All in all, 160 pages of well-designed fun, with enough background and personalities to get up and running. An adventure would have rounded out the book nicely, and the frequent persona quotes were more forced than funny, but story hooks are easily developed and the fundamental setup is humorous without being annoying."
