= Thieves of the Tome =

Thieves of the Tome is a 2024 role-playing game published by First Pancake Studios.

== Gameplay ==
Thieves of the Tome is a game in which a thief seizes stolen magic to outwit the wizards who took it, twisting unpredictable spell effects into daring escapes and claiming the destiny of a true Thief of the Tome.

== Reception ==
Francesco Cacciatore reviewed Thieves of the Tome for Polygon and said that "It's messy, unpredictable, and occasionally taxing, but any game that forces you to look for inspiration and turn that into something creative is a worthy addition to a GM's library."

Thieves of the Tome was nominated for "Best Game" and "Best Rules" for the 2026 ENNIE Awards.
