= Khaotic =

- Publisher: Marquee Press
- Publication date: 1994

Khaotic is a 1994 role-playing game published by Marquee Press.

== Gameplay ==
Khaotic is a game in which a trans-dimensional cyberpunk roleplaying setting centers on Isabella Bayne, a sociopathic physicist from World War II who discovers a way to psychically travel to another dimension called Xenos. There, she becomes a dictator, enhancing local creatures with psychic and biomechanical powers. Nearly a century later, she begins sending her evolved subjects back to Earth to prepare for invasion. In response, Earth's agency ISES sends its own operatives into Xenos using Bayne's technology. One game mechanic involves the entire player group inhabiting a single host body in Xenos, with control determined by the character with the highest Willpower.

== Publication history ==
Khaotic was published by small publisher Marquee Press and written by Joe and Kathleen Williams.

== Reception ==
Chris W. McCubbin reviewed Khaotic for Pyramid magazine and stated that "Obviously this is not the game for those who like big, slick and mainstream, but in a market where the simple goal of 'something different' is becoming ever more chimeral, Khaotic qualifies as a truly unique roleplaying experience."

== Reviews ==
- Shadis #17 (Jan., 1995)
- Interactive Fantasy (Issue 2 - 1994)
- Casus Belli #087
