= Quest of the Ancients =

- 1st edition cover
- Designers: Vince Garcia
- Publishers: Unicorn Game Publications
- Publication: 1982, 1988
- Genres: Heroic Fantasy
- Systems: proprietary / skill-based

Quest of the Ancients is an independent role-playing game published in the late 1980s by Unicorn Game Publications.

== Gameplay ==
It is mainly a Dungeons & Dragons clone, in that it was character class- and level-based, used a Dungeon & Dragons style Vancian Magic system, and used a skill system similar to the Advanced Dungeons & Dragons thief skill system. Most notably, it used a thirty sided die (or d30) for combat resolution.

Written by Vince Garcia of Fresno, California, the game system implements a large number of character classes.

== Reception ==
Stewart Wieck reviewed Quest of the Ancients in White Wolf #28 (Aug./Sept., 1991), rating it a 3 out of 5 and stated that "This game would be deserving of extra attention if the author had included more information about the game world or even a sample adventure (a pet peeve of mine). As it is QA is a game without a world, and since there are plenty of FRPGs available, there is nothing to distinguish this one beyond being what the new edition of AD&D should have been."

== Sources ==
- https://web.archive.org/web/20080522202607/http://www.pen-paper.net/rpgdb.php?op=showline&gamelineid=267
- http://www.darkshire.net/jhkim/rpg/encyclopedia/alphabetical/P-Q.html
