= M.I.S.S.I.O.N. =

Tabletop role-playing game

M.I.S.S.I.O.N. is a role-playing game published by Kabal Gaming Systems in 1982.

== Description ==
M.I.S.S.I.O.N. is an espionage system. The game includes a rulebook (that covers mainly skills and combat), maps, floor plans, and cardstock building pieces.

== Publication history ==
M.I.S.S.I.O.N. was designed by Ernest T. Hams and published by Kabal Gaming Systems in 1982 as a boxed set including a 16-page digest-sized book, seven color maps, four floor-plan sheets, and four cardstock sheets.

== Reception ==
Lawrence Schick cautioned: "you'll need a calculator to perform some of the complex calculations required in these rules".
