= Realm Controller's Manual =

Realm Controller's Manual is a 1991 role-playing supplement for Realms of the Unknown published by The Walnut Group.

== Contents ==
Realm Controller's Manual is a supplement in which the gamemaster creates plots to challenge the realms controlled by the player characters.

== Reception ==
Stewart Wieck reviewed Realm Controller's Manual in White Wolf #32 (July/Aug., 1992), rating it a 4 out of 5 and stated that "The RCs Manual is pricey [...] but your group only requires one copy of it."

== Reviews ==
- Shadis #11
