= List of OGL publishers =

This is a partial list of companies that have published roleplaying games under the provisions of the Open Game License (OGL) issued by Wizards of the Coast.

- Alderac Entertainment Group/Crafty Games, Spycraft 2.0
- Amarillo Design Bureau, Inc., "Prime Directive d20", "Prime Directive PD20 Modern"
- Arc Dream Publishing, Delta Green Need to Know
- Bards and Sages, Neiyar: Land of Heaven and the Abyss, Koboldnomicon
- Cubicle 7 Games, Broken Weave
- Editora JBC, Defensores de Tóquio - Manual 4D&T
- Evil Hat Productions, Fate, Spirit of the Century, The Dresden Files RPG
- Goodman Games, Dungeon Crawl Classics, Fifth Edition Fantasy, and more
- Green Ronin Publishing, True20 Adventure Roleplaying Game, Mutants & Masterminds Roleplaying Game
- Mongoose Publishing, OGL Ancients, OGL CyberNet: Cyberpunk Roleplaying, OGL Horror, OGL Manga, OGL Steampunk, OGL Wild West
- Paizo Publishing, Pathfinder Roleplaying Game, Starfinder Roleplaying Game
- Pinnacle Entertainment, Pathfinder for Savage Worlds.
- Skirmisher Publishing LLC, Nuisances
- Spica Publishing, third party publishers of products for the current edition of the Traveller SF RPG.
