= Justin D. Jacobson =

American role-playing game designer (born 1970)

- Born: 1970 (age 55–56); Florida, U.S.
- Education: Princeton University (AB); Duke University School of Law (JD)
- Occupation: Board game necromancer
- Children: 2

Justin D. Jacobson is an attorney and professional game designer.

== Career ==
Justin D. Jacobson is an attorney, and was the owner and operator of Blue Devil Games, publishers of role-playing games and strategy games. He is best known as the designer of Poisoncraft: The Dark Art, Dawning Star, and Passages, and the winner of the About.com 2004 Shared Pieces Design Competition for Golem.

In 2004, Blue Devil Games was one of the seven companies working with Indie Press Revolution as a fulfillment house to serve small press publishers with their publications in terms of warehousing, selling, and shipping to customers directly. Jacobson joined with Fred Hicks and Rob Donoghue of Evil Hat Productions and Chris Hanrahan in 2008 to form the game company One Bad Egg, intending to publish high-quality PDFs for fourth edition Dungeons & Dragons which encouraged storytelling in play; however, sales were bad, and Hicks announced in September 2009 that One Bad Egg would be closing down.

=== Restoration Games ===
In 2016 Jacobson and Rob Daviau founded Restoration Games, a tabletop game publishing company specializing in out-of-print mass-market games from the 1960s, 1970s, 1980s, and 1990s. Their company was announced at Gen Con 2016. After allowing people to send in suggestions for which games to restore through their website, Jacobson and his team decided on Stop Thief!, Downforce (an iteration of Wolfgang Kramer's Top Race series), and Indulgence (a recreation of the card game Dragonmaster). Stop Thief was funded on Kickstarter, where it raised over $100,000. Jacobson's next foray into Kickstarter was bringing back the classic Fireball Island as Fireball Island: The Curse of Vul-Kar. On Kickstarter it raised over $2.8 million with over 23,000 backers. The third game funded on Kickstarter for Jacobson and Restoration is their biggest to date. The game, Return to Dark Tower is a sequel to the legendary Dark Tower that was released in 1981. The sequel raised over $4 million from over 23,000 backers. Restoration and Jacobson's most popular non-kickstarter based game is called Unmatched, which is based on the 2002 release Star Wars Epic Duels. They produce this game along with Mondo. To date, thirty characters have been released. These releases range from licensed one-character boxes, such as Bruce Lee, to box sets with four public domain characters like Cobble & Fog, featuring Dracula, the Invisible Man, Jekyll and Hyde, and Sherlock Holmes. The two most recent releases are part of a licensed deal with Marvel, with two more sets to come in the future. In 2020 Jacobson and Restoration held a contest for fans to create their own characters. These have yet to be released. Regarding his future goals, he said in a 2021 interview that his dream character for Unmatched is Muhammad Ali and his dream IP is James Bond.
