= Blue Devil Games =

Blue Devil Games publishes role-playing games and games of strategy.

== Description ==
The company is best known for Dawning Star, the first full-scale science fiction campaign setting using the d20 Future rules from Wizards of the Coast and Passages, a role-playing game of literary adventure. They have also published Golem, winner of the 2004 About.com Shared Pieces Design Competition. In addition, the company has produced supplements for Arcana Evolved in its AEvolutions line. On March 21, 2008, the company announced that it had entered into a license with Barry Eisler to publish a role-playing game based on his John Rain novels.

== History ==
Shannon Appelcline discussed how an important event changing the role-playing game industry occurred in 2004 "when Ed Cha and Brennan Taylor formed the Indie Press Revolution (IPR), a fulfillment house serving "independent" publishers by warehousing, selling, and shipping their books direct to consumers. By the end of the year they were working with seven companies: Adept Press, Anvilwerks, Blue Devil Games, Bob Goat Press, and NerdNYC — as well as Taylor's Galileo Games and Cha's Open World Press. By the end of 2005, they were working with 19. Key 20 Games Distribution also appeared late in 2005 with a mandate to distribute indie games into retail stores. Though they only survived a few years, for a time they were a nice complement to IPR."

Appelcline explained that IPR was picky in what companies they worked with, since customers often had trouble finding good games: "IPR wanted to help customers with this problem, so membership was invite-only — ensuring that IPR was only selling the best of the best. The first four publishers selected for IPR were: Blue Devil Games, Bob Goat Press, Galileo Games, and Open World Press." Appelcline added that "The initial composition of IPR's member companies is interesting because it doesn't match most peoples' conception of what IPR is. Three of the publishers were d20 companies. That's all Open World ever published, while Galileo Games was at the time known for Bulldogs!; similarly Blue Devil Games just kicked off their d20 production with Poisoncraft (2004). Another three were what were called "Forge" publishers: Adept Press, the publisher of Sorcerer (2001); Anvilwerks, the publisher of The Shadow of Yesterday (2004); and Bob Goat Press, the publisher of Conspiracy of Shadows (2004). NerdNYC was a t-shirt producer, which meant that IPR was evenly split between d20 and the Forge." Appelcline further noted the relationship between IPR and its member companies at game conventions: "You could also measure IPR's growth through its con presence. At Origins '05 they were borrowing booth space from Key 20, and at Gen Con Indy 2005 they were hosted by Blue Devil. However, just a year later, IPR was in the thick of things. They had their own booth at Origins '06, and then at Gen Con Indy 2006 they were one of the primary sponsors of the Forge booth — alongside Adept Press, Burning Wheel, Lumpley Games, and Timfire Publishing."
