= Dawning Star =

Tabletop role-playing game

- Cover of Dawning Star: Helios Rising
- Designers: Justin D. Jacobson, Lee Hammock
- Publishers: Blue Devil Games
- Publication: 2005
- Genres: Science fiction
- Systems: d20 System

Dawning Star (abbreviated DS) is a 2005 science fiction role-playing game by Blue Devil Games built on d20 Modern and powered by d20 Future by Wizards of the Coast. It was the first full-scale campaign setting using the d20 Future ruleset. It was published under the Open Game License. A new version using the FATE rules appeared in 2017.

The setting is self-described as "firm science" and is designed to support a number of science-fiction subgenres, including: space Western, 'bug hunt' (like the Alien series of films or Starship Troopers), alien ruin exploration, political intrigue, etc.

== Synopsis ==
The setting history commences in the year 2184. Having detected a dark object on a collision course with Earth, a massive multinational evacuation plan is set into motion. The evacuation takes place in 2196 shortly before the destruction of Earth. At the outer limits of the Solar System, the evacuation fleet interacts with a Tentaari gateway device. Because the device is damaged, the ships of the fleet are scattered randomly throughout the galaxy. One ship—the titular Dawning Star—finds itself in the Helios system. The humans land on Eos, one of the planets in the system that is environmentally quite similar to Earth.

Following their arrival, the humans begin to colonize the planet and explore the numerous alien ruins that dot the planet's surface. A government is established called the Dawning Star Republic. However, some of the rebellious colonists break away to form the Eos Freedom League. In 2248, the Tentaari make contact with the humans. They are very secretive about the history of the planet and are cautious about helping the humans. In 2249, humans first encounter the Velin, an indigenous species similar in appearance to humans.

== Alien species ==
The following species of aliens exist in the Dawning Star setting. This list is not exhaustive.

- Haimedians: Plant-based humanoids that are the minority population on C'thalk. They are experts with organic technology, including genetically engineering task-based species.
- Humans: Evacuees of Earth and their descendants. They have colonized Eos and are just starting to explore the rest of the Helios system.
- Saurians: The dominant population on C'thalk. They are genetically similar to terran dinosaurs and have four primary sub-species: brachins, flyers, shellbacks, and tyrans.
- Tentaari: Small gray humanoids. They are highly intelligent but also mysterious, reluctant to share any information with the humans.
- Vaasi: The primary “villains” of the setting, consisting of several related insectoid xenomorphs, including true vaasi, phrenics, and vaasi warhounds. Also referred to as "darklings".
- Velin: A humanoid species indigenous to Eos. They are very similar to humans, causing some to theorize that they are genetically related.

== Publishing history ==
The game went into development shortly after the announcement by Wizards of the Coast that they would be publishing d20 Future. Blue Devil Games stated a desire to be the first campaign setting using the d20 Future rules. To accomplish the feat they announced that they would attempt to fully develop the setting prior to the release of the book. Then, upon d20 Future's publication, they would incorporate the rules into the setting material. If successful, they would be able to publish Dawning Star immediately upon the release of the d20 Future rules to the System Reference Document.

The plan suffered two setbacks. Joseph Martin was the initial author contracted to write the setting. Citing lack of time to complete the job given the time constraints, he was released from the project. (Martin has a credit in the book for the “original concept”.) At that time, Lee Hammock was contracted to complete the project. Additionally, Danilo Moretti was contracted to take over art direction duties.

As a result of these obstacles, the book was delayed for several months after the publication of d20 Future. However, during that time, no other company published a campaign setting based upon the rules. Dawning Star: Operation Quick Launch was released in PDF format on February 24, 2005, and released in print format shortly thereafter. It is the first full-scale campaign setting using the d20 Future rules and remained the only such setting for some time.

Following its release, Dawning Star: Operation Quick Launch earned a 2005 ENnie nomination for Best d20 Game.

In 2005, Blue Devil Games released Shadow Falling, an adventure module for the setting.

Blue Devil Games released Helios Rising at Gen Con in 2006. It was originally scheduled to be published as a 208-page book and released at Gen Con in 2005. However, the book expanded to 540 pages. The book describes the rest of the Helios system in great detail, including 12 playable PC species and hundreds of feats, occupations, talent trees, classes, and equipment. The book also describes 'Red Truth', a futuristic take on psionics. In 2007, Helios Rising earned four ENnie nominations for Best Cover Art, Best Setting, Best d20/OGL Product, and Product of the Year. Helios Rising is the largest science-fiction setting book ever published.

In 2006, Blue Devil Games also started the TERRAFORMER line of products, a regular series of short texts in PDF with additional content for the setting.

At Gen Con 2007, Blue Devil Games hosted a "Dawning Star VIP Game for Charity". The public bid on and purchased tickets to both play in and attend the event that was held in a private room at the Alcatraz Brewing Company. JD Wiker, one of the designers of d20 Future was the VIP. Lee Hammock was the GM. During the game, players and attendees were able to donate additional money to influence the events in the game. One attendee, donated $5 to have the elevator between ship levels play bad elevator music; another donated $60 to "summon" a Vaasi war mech. All told, the event raised $2,500 to benefit the Shriners Hospitals for Children.

Blue Devil Games ran a successful Kickstarter campaign to relaunch the setting using the Fate Core rules from Evil Hat Productions. The campaign ended on October 15, 2013, with 884 backers pledging a total of $28,138.

== Books ==
- Dawning Star: Operation Quick Launch: campaign setting for the d20 Future rules (2005)
- Shadow Falling: adventure scenario (2005)
- Dawning Star: Helios Rising: campaign setting (2006)
- Dawning Star: Fate of Eos: Campaign Setting for the FATE rules (2017)

== Reviews ==
- Richeson, C. W. "Review of Dawning Star: Operation Quick Launch". RPGnet. Archived from the original on September 30, 2007.
