= Open gaming =

Mode of role-playing gaming

Open gaming is a movement within the tabletop role-playing game (RPG) industry with superficial similarities to the open source software movement. The key aspect is that copyright holders license their works under public copyright licenses that permit others to make copies or create derivative works of the game.

A number of role-playing game publishers have joined the open gaming movement, largely as a result of the release of the original System Reference Document (SRD) by Wizards of the Coast, which consisted of the core rules of Dungeons & Dragons 3rd edition. Open gaming has also been popular among small press role-playing game and supplement authors.

== History ==
The use of the term open gaming began with the publication of the original SRD and the simultaneous release of the Open Game License (OGL). However, role-playing games had been licensed under open and free content licenses before this.

=== The Fudge Legal Notice ===
The Fudge role-playing game system was created in 1992 by Steffan O'Sullivan with extensive help from the rec.games.design community. The name stood for "Freeform Universal Donated Game Engine" until Steffan O'Sullivan changed 'donated' to 'DIY' in 1995.

One reason why Fudge succeeded is that the author released it under the "FUDGE Legal Notice", a license that removed most restrictions on non-commercial use. However the FUDGE Legal Notice (more commonly known as simply "the Fudge license") was never intended to cover any work other than its eponymous role-playing game. Derivative works which were to be distributed for a fee required written permission from Fudge's author, Steffan O'Sullivan. The details of the Fudge Legal Notice were modified and expanded from time to time as O'Sullivan updated his work, but the essential elements of the license remained unchanged. The 1993 FUDGE Legal Notice allowed reprinting of the Fudge rules, including in otherwise commercial works, as long as certain conditions were met. The 1995 FUDGE Legal Notice permitted the creation of derivative works for personal use and for publication in periodicals.

In March 2004, Grey Ghost Games acquired the copyright of Fudge, and on April 6, 2005, they released a version of Fudge under the Open Game License, making it open for commercial use.

=== Dominion Rules and Circe ===
The phrase "opensource roleplaying" was used as early as 1999 by the Dominion Rules role-playing system, the license of which permitted supplementary material to be written for its rules. Another "open" system was the Circe role-playing system, published by the WorldForge project under the GNU Free Documentation License (GFDL). Gods & Monsters, created by Jerry Stratton, was also distributed under GFDL in 2013.

=== Open Game License ===
Despite Fudge and other games, the open gaming movement did not gain widespread recognition within the role-playing game industry until 2000, when Wizards of the Coast (WotC) published portions of the 3rd Edition of Dungeons & Dragons as the System Reference Document under the Open Game License. This move was driven by Ryan Dancey then Brand Manager for WotC, who drafted the Open Game License and first coined the term "open gaming" with respect to role-playing games.

==== Open Gaming Foundation ====
The Open Gaming Foundation (OGF) was founded by Ryan Dancey as an independent forum for discussion of open gaming among the members of the fledgling open gaming movement. The OGF consisted of a web site and a series of mailing lists, including the OGF-L list (for general discussion of open gaming licensing issues) and the OGF-d20-L list (for discussion of d20-specific issues).

The most common criticism of the OGF was that it was primarily a venue for publicizing Wizards of the Coast. Ryan Dancey was an employee of WotC, and discussion on the mailing lists tended to focus on d20 and the OGL (both owned by WotC) rather than on open gaming in general.

The OGF maintained a definition of an "open game license" while it was active, with two criteria:

1. The license must allow game rules and materials that use game rules to be freely copied, modified and distributed.
2. The license must ensure that material distributed using the license cannot have those permissions restricted in the future.

The Foundation explicitly stated that the first condition excludes licences that ban commercial use. The second requirement is intended to ensure that the rights granted by the licence are inalienable.

==== Reaction ====
The OGL gained immediate popularity with commercial role-playing game publishers. However, the OGL was criticized (primarily by independent role-playing game developers) for being insufficiently "open", and for being controlled by the market leader Wizards of the Coast. In response to this, and in an attempt to shift support away from the OGL and toward more open licenses, several alternatives to the OGL were suggested and drafted. Similarly, the popularity of the OGL inspired others to create their own, specific open content licenses. Virtually none of these gained acceptance beyond the works of the licenses' own authors, and many have since been abandoned.

=== Open RPG Creative License ===
Linda Codega, for Io9 in January 2023, reported on the details from a leaked full copy of an update to the OGL including updated terms such as no longer authorizing use of the OGL1.0. Codega highlighted that "if the original license is in fact no longer viable, every single licensed publisher will be affected by the new agreement. [...] The main takeaway from the leaked OGL 1.1 draft document is that WotC is keeping power close at hand". Following this, Paizo announced a new Open RPG Creative License (ORC) as a direct response to the reported changes to the OGL. Additional publishers, such as Kobold Press, Chaosium, Green Ronin, Legendary Games, and Rogue Genius Games, were announced to be part of the ORC development process. The ORC was described as an open, perpetual, and irrevocable system-agnostic license with legal development paid for by Paizo "under the legal guidance of Azora Law", however, the license "will not be owned by Paizo, nor will it be owned by any company who makes money publishing RPGs". Paizo planned to find a "nonprofit with a history of open source values to own this license" and stated that "Azora Law's ownership of the process and stewardship should provide a safe harbor against any company being bought, sold, or changing management in the future and attempting to rescind rights or nullify sections of the license".

The ORC was released in July 2023. The copyright to its text is owned by Azora Law who have dedicated it to the public domain "as a safe harbor against the license being controlled by any company being bought, sold, or changing management in the future and attempting to rescind rights or nullify sections of the license".

=== Free League Publishing's licenses ===
Free League Publishing announced two licenses, for its Year Zero game system and another for its upcoming fantasy RPG Dragonbane.

== Adoption ==
The most common open gaming license in use by commercial role-playing game publishers is the OGL. There are many publishers currently producing material based on the first System Reference Document, and many which make their products available under the OGL but which use game systems not based on the SRD.

Wizards of the Coast used the non-open Game System License for the 4th edition of Dungeons & Dragons, but released a new System Reference Document in 2015 for the 5th edition licensed under the OGL.

== Approved licences ==
The Open Gaming Foundation describes these licences as ‘Known Open Gaming Licenses’.

- The Open Gaming License drafted by Wizards of the Coast
- The GNU General Public License, and the Free Documentation License drafted by the Free Software Foundation
- The Open Content License by OpenContent qualifies as long as neither of the License Options in Section VI of the license are used.
- The Creative Commons "CC-BY" license and the Creative Commons "CC-BY-SA" license

== Open games ==
The following games are fully or partly under an Open Gaming Foundation-approved license or a free culture license.

- 13th Age by Fire Opal Media, published under license by Pelgrane Press (OGL)
- Blades in the Dark by One Seven Design, in association with Evil Hat Productions (CC-BY 3.0)
- Castles & Crusades by Troll Lord Games (OGL)
- Dominion Rules (Dominion Rules License)
- Dungeon World by Sage LaTorra and Adam Koebel (CC-BY 3.0 and OGL)
- Eclipse Phase by Posthuman Studios (CC BY-NC-SA 3.0)
- Fate by Fantastic Adventures in Tabletop Entertainment (OGL and CC-BY 3.0)
- Fudge System Reference Document by Grey Ghost Games (OGL)
- Gumshoe System by Pelgrane Press (CC-BY-3.0/OGL)
- Labyrinth Lord by Goblinoid Games (OGL)
- Legend by Mongoose Publishing (OGL)
- OpenD6, based on the D6 System originally published by West End Games (OGL)
- OSRIC by Stuart Marshall and Mathew Finch (OGL)
- Pathfinder Roleplaying Game by Paizo (OGL)
- Traveller (role-playing game) by Mongoose Publishing (OGL)

== Retro-clone systems ==
A number of fans and publishers have used existing open game content to create rules systems which closely emulate older editions of games that are no longer supported, and released those rules systems under an open license. The term "retro-clone" was coined by Goblinoid Games, the publisher of Labyrinth Lord.

Notable examples of retro-clone games are Basic Fantasy RPG (based on Basic Dungeons & Dragons), OSRIC (based on 1st edition Advanced Dungeons & Dragons), Labyrinth Lord (based on Basic Dungeons & Dragons), and Swords & Wizardry (based on original Dungeons & Dragons).
