= Happy Birthday, Robot! =

Happy Birthday, Robot! is a role-playing game published by Evil Hat Productions in 2010.

== Description ==
Happy Birthday, Robot! is a storytelling game specifically aimed at children.

== Publication history ==
Not long after they released the books for The Dresden Files Role playing Game, Evil Hat Productions published another indie role-playing game, the storytelling game Happy Birthday, Robot! (2010) by Daniel Solis.

== Reception ==
Shannon Appelcline states that the Happy Birthday, Robot! "short storytelling game could easily have been part of Hogshead Publishing's 'New Style'. It is also one of the few RPGs specifically aimed at kids, joining Firefly Games' Faery's Tale (2006) in a very small subcategory." Wired (magazine) called the game "a blur between Euro-style board games and RPGs".

In 2011, Happy Birthday, Robot! was nominated for the ENnie for Best Game, but lost to another Evil Hat game, The Dresden Files Roleplaying Game; Happy Birthday, Robot! was also nominated for Best New Game (published for the first time ever), Best Production Values, and Product of the Year.
