= Lee Thommock =

American writer and game designer (1976–2022)

Lee Hammock (November 28, 1976 – September 2, 2022), who changed his surname to Thommock later in life, was an American professional writer and game designer who worked on numerous products for various companies, including the NeoExodus: A House Divided role-playing game (Louis Porter Jr. Design), The Halo Graphic Novel and the Dawning Star Campaign Setting (Blue Devil Games).

== Early life ==
Hammock was born on November 28, 1976 and raised in Georgia. At an early age he was diagnosed with a heart murmur, and although he was barred from organized sports, he still led an active life. In high school, Hammock became interested in videogames and role-playing games. The latter led him into the world of LARPing.

== Career ==
Hammock worked creatively in the fields of graphic novels, comics, role-playing games and videogames for companies such as Bethesda Games, Paizo, Tripwire Interactive, and Blizzard Entertainment.

Hammock co-designed the licensed Farscape role-playing game for Alderac Entertainment Group. He also co-designed the Dawning Star Campaign Setting with Justin D. Jacobson for Blue Devil Games, which was subsequently a finalist for "Best d20 Game" at the 2002 ENNIE Awards.

Hammock worked for DC Comics. Hammock wrote the story "The Last Voyage of the Infinite Succor" for The Halo Graphic Novel. He described the process of writing the story as a "heady task" since he had to respect Halo fans' knowledge of the characters and canon, ensuring that "characters that [the fans] know as a part of themselves are portrayed aptly". Hammock described the basis of the story as a way to showcase the true danger of the Flood as an intelligent menace, rather than something the player encounters and shoots. Hammock also stated that the story would prove the intelligent nature of the Flood, and "hopefully euthanize the idea that they are just space zombies".

Hammock co-designed the NeoExodus: A House Divided RPG for Louis Porter Jr. Design. He also co-designed the Arcane Tech book for the Fading Suns role-playing game.

Hammock was lead game designer on Fallen Earth. On April 5, 2010, the Fallen Earth team announced that Hammock was leaving Fallen Earth to work as story designer on a new MMO title, Gargantuan.

== Personal life ==
After Hammock married Lindsay Thompson, they both legally changed their surnames to "Thommack", a portmanteau of "Thompson" and "Hammock". They had several children. He suffered a stroke on September 1, 2022, and died the next day, age 45.
