= Don't Rest Your Head =

Tabletop horror role-playing game

Don't Rest Your Head is a role-playing game published by Evil Hat Productions in 2006.

== Description ==
Don't Rest Your Head is an indie role-playing game where characters who cannot sleep draw upon that insomnia for power.

== Publication history ==
While working on Fate and Spirit of the Century, as a side-project Fred Hicks worked on indie role-playing game Don't Rest Your Head (2006), which instead wound up being the first published game from Evil Hat Productions. Don't Rest Your Head was critically acclaimed and did not take long to sell through the initial print on demand print run ordered by Evil Hat.

== Reception and legacy ==
Don't Rest Your Head was a runner-up for Indie Game of the Year at the 2006 Indie RPG Awards, losing to Spirit of the Century.

Shannon Appelcline commented on the game: "Don't Rest Your Head included some clever dice mechanics and some resources, all bound up in an evocative setting. People who cannot sleep draw upon that insomnia for power. As they take actions, players can choose to use madness and exhaustion dice alongside their discipline dice – but as they do so, they can go around the bend, with either insanity or nightmares catching up. Hope and despair enter the game system as coins, which players and the GM exchange with others to bend the story to their needs. When a GM uses despair he gives hope to the players and vice-versa; thus all participants in the game get to balance their involvement in plot creation."

Jay Little listed Don't Rest Your Head as one of his several influences for his design of the third edition of Warhammer Fantasy Roleplay (2009).

In 2008, the game supplement Don't Lose Your Mind won the Indie RPG Awards for Indie Supplement of the Year. Don't Lose Your Mind won the Silver ENnie for Best Writing, and was also nominated for Product of the Year.
