= Scott Rouse =

Role-playing game designer

- Occupation: Game production

Scott Rouse was the D&D Brand Manager at Wizards of the Coast, and part of the production staff for the fourth edition of Dungeons & Dragons.

== Career ==
Scott Rouse, Brand Manager for Dungeons & Dragons at Wizards of the Coast, together with D&D Licensing Manager Linae Foster created a new Open Gaming License (OGL) after the departure of its creator Ryan Dancey. On April 19, 2007, Wizards of the Coast announced that it would not be renewing Paizo Publishing's licenses for Dragon and Dungeon and Rouse stated, "Today the internet is where people go to get this kind of information. By moving to an online model we are using a delivery system that broadens our reach to fans around the world." Rouse and Foster worked on a new OGL to support the fourth edition of Dungeons & Dragons beginning in 2007, which became the Game System License by 2008. Rouse was the only remaining Wizards of the Coast employee who was openly supportive of open gaming when he left the company on October 12, 2009.
