= Rob Donoghue =

American role-playing game designer

- Occupation: Game designer

Rob Donoghue is a game designer who has worked primarily on role-playing games. Together with Fred Hicks he created the Fate system and has been designer or lead designer of numerous award-winning role playing games. He was a lead designer of the role-playing games Spirit of the Century and a designer of The Dresden Files Roleplaying Game, and has also worked closely with Cam Banks on the Cortex Plus games, a lead designer for Leverage: The Roleplaying Game, and as a designer for Marvel Heroic Roleplaying. He has also contributed to Dungeons & Dragons 4th edition publications.

== Career ==
Rob Donoghue was a friend of Fred Hicks, and was among the people in 1999 working with Hicks running Live-action role-playing events at AmberCon NorthWest. Hicks and Donoghue developed FATE after talking about their problems with FUDGE, and they released FATE on the internet through Evil Hat. Donoghue and Hicks released the first edition of FATE through Yahoo! Groups in January 2003, and then produced a second edition that they published in August 2003. Donoghue wrote the game Spirit of the Century (2006), with Leonard Balsera. Hicks and Donoghue formed the company One Bad Egg in 2008 with Chris Hanrahan and Justin D. Jacobson to publish PDFs for Dungeons & Dragons 4th edition. Donoghue and Hicks were two of the nine designers who wrote The Dresden Files Roleplaying Game. Donoghue co-designed Leverage: The Roleplaying Game (2011) with other writers including Cam Banks and Clark Valentine for Margaret Weis Productions.

His Dungeons & Dragons design work includes Dungeon Master's Guide 2 (2009) and Adventurer's Vault 2 (2009).
