= How We Came To Live Here =

Tabletop role-playing game by Brennan Taylor

- Designers: Brennan Taylor
- Publishers: Galileo Games
- Publication: 2010 (1st edition)
- Genres: Alternate history, Indie
- Systems: Custom

How We Came To Live Here is an independently published role-playing game written by Brennan Taylor and published by Galileo Games.

== Development ==
Brennan Taylor began work in 2005 on a role-playing game based on the legends of the ancestral Puebloans, but set that game aside to finish his work on the game Mortal Coil. He resumed work on this game in fall 2006, calling it "The Fifth World", but had to change the name because a post-apocalyptic RPG called The Fifth World (2006) was going to be published first. Taylor asked fans to comment on alternative names he thought of such as "Twin Souls," "Up from the Fourth World," "So That This World Will Not Be Destroyed," "Into the Light," and "How We Came to Live Here"; Taylor ultimately decided to use the last of those, because he felt that it was evocative of the mythic feeling he wanted for the game. As the game was being developed, How We Came to Live Here initially borrowed the mechanics of The Shadow of Yesterday, but Taylor did not want to be confined by that model although it kept the influence of The Shadow of Yesterday. How We Came to Live Here was previewed online in July 2008 in an ashcan edition, and a final edition was then released in March 2010.

== Setting ==
How We Came to Live Here has what Shannon Appelcline describes as "an evocative southwestern setting — something that was near to Taylor's heart due to his youth spent growing up in Tucson, Arizona. There's lots of background on the culture and life of the Pueblo People; Taylor builds on that by including myths in the rules text itself."

The game is inspired by the legends and folkways of Oasisamerica.

== System ==
According to Shannon Appelcline,

Like The Shadow of Yesterday — and like Mortal Coil — How We Came to Live Here focuses on resource management. Player take turns framing scenes; then, when a conflict arises, they roll dice. The actual conflict is played out through players choosing dice from their rolls and then narrating the results — a system that was clearly inspired by Dogs in the Vineyard. Resources come into play when players choose to refresh traits and otherwise improve their chances at winning a contest — but in doing so give the GMs dice to use in the future.

Appelcline also described two elements of the game that he found particularly notable:

First, its conflict system has an innovative result system, where players get to choose to spend their "victory dice" for specific sorts of consequences. Second, it uses two GMs, something that many indie designers have played with, but few have brought to publication. In this case, the two GMs are responsible for different sorts of threats, from the "Inside" or the "Outside."

The game is predicated on a rich relationship map that defines both individuals and potential sources of trouble within a village. How We Came To Live Here uses Fudge dice for resolution - pools of dice with positive, null, or negative results.
