= Brennan Taylor =

Role-playing game author and publisher

- Occupations: role-playing games author, designer, and publisher

Brennan Taylor is an American role-playing games author and publisher.

== Career ==
Brennan Taylor co-founded Indie Press Revolution with Ed Cha of Open World Press in 2004 and was its first CEO. When Taylor hired Fred Hicks of Evil Hat Games as a part-time staff member, Ron Edwards left IPR claiming that this move would make IPR less friendly to the small press games companies that it was intended to serve. In 2010, Hero Games purchased Indie Press Revolution from Taylor and Cha. Although Taylor stepped down as president, he maintains a minority share. Taylor served as president prior to the next CEO Jason Walters.

Taylor is also the owner of Galileo Games, publisher of the games Bulldogs!, Mortal Coil, and How We Came To Live Here. He is also the author of Hard Boilded Empires: Solara, Old Gods: A Mortal Coil Campaign Frame, and The Jersey Side playset for the independent RPG, Fiasco.
