= Interstellar Elite Combat =

Interstellar Elite Combat is a 1991 role-playing game published by Game Masters Associated.

== Gameplay ==
Interstellar Elite Combat is a game in which a far future humanity has evolved through various ages, now on the brink of the Ultratech Age. In this era, the Ultratech Elite, highly trained warriors, dominate the battlefield. These elites come from two distinct Zones: the capitalist Neutral Zone and the techno-tyrannical Imperial Zone. Both Zones produce supreme warriors who enjoy the lifestyle of the rich and famous, participating in the Games of Hem-Shalam for glory and wealth. The game is comprehensive, including rules, tables, and mechanics, along with detailed histories of the Zones and the Hem-Shalam games. The book is illustrated and professionally laid out, featuring photocopiable sheets for various armor types and extensive lists of equipment. Players can start from various professions and aspire to become elites, engaging in combat that uses percentile dice and motion phases called "mophs." The combat system is complex, but designed to be fast and deadly. The introductory adventure includes subplots and NPCs.

== Publication history ==
Shannon Appelcline noted that Wizards of the Coast began distributing the small-press role-playing game Interstellar Elite Combat in the early 1990s. Wizards put most of their RPG lines on hiatus when the collectible card game market crashed, and by 1994 they declared that they would not publish a second edition of Interstellar Elite Combat.

The supplement Interstellar Elite Arctic Combat was also published in 1991.

== Reception ==
Allen Mixson reviewed Interstellar Elite Combat in White Wolf #28 (Aug./Sept., 1991), rating it a 4 out of 5 and stated that "Overall, Interstellar Elite Combat is a well-written, highly detailed system [...] If you like a game where you roleplay instead of acting out technicalities, this game is for you."

== Reviews ==
- The Game Oracle (Issue 7)
