= Game System License =

Open license of Dungeons & Dragons 4th edition

The Game System License is a license that allows third-party publishers to create products compatible with and using the intellectual property from the 4th edition of Dungeons & Dragons (D&D). Wizards of the Coast (WotC) released it to the public by on June 17, 2008.

== History ==
A System Reference Document (SRD) of the 3rd edition of D&D had been licensed under the Open Game License (OGL). The OGL is a copyright license, allowing the use of copyrighted text created by others in one's products. Also released at the same time was the d20 System Trademark License, allowing third-party publishers to indicate compatibility using a system logo, but not allowing the use of the D&D trademark.

The Game System License (GSL), however, grants use of the 4th Edition System Reference Document, which lists trademarks, words, and short phrases that could be used to refer to materials in the Dungeons & Dragons 4th edition rules, but contains no rules itself. People wishing to use this license are also granted a logo that must be placed onto their products to state that they are compatible with Dungeon & Dragons 4th Edition. The license also can be updated by Wizards of the Coast and updates affect all licensees; in case of litigation the licensees must pay the legal costs of Wizards of the Coast.

Prior to Gen Con 2008, it was announced that the GSL was undergoing a revision in response to concerns raised by third-party publishers and the community. Shortly after the end of the convention a number of Wizards of the Coast's jobs were eliminated, including the Licensing Manager position that was held by Linae Foster.

With the release of the 5th edition of D&D in 2014, and the release under the OGL of an SRD for that edition, the GSL fell into disuse, though it remains the only license for 4th edition.

== Reception ==
In August 2008, ICv2 highlighted that "the reaction to the 4th Edition GSL has been mixed at best. While some companies such as Mongoose and Goodman are producing third party 4th Edition product, others such as Green Ronin and Necromancer are not". After reviewing the terms and conditions of the GSL, Necromancer Games co-founder Clark Peterson declared it "an unmitigated disaster", and that his company would cease its efforts to support the new edition. Chris Pramas, founder of Green Ronin, stated that they did not "feel that this license treats third-party publishers as valued partners". Fred Hicks, for the publisher One Bad Egg, commented that his initial reaction to the GSL was "crushing disappointment" and viewed the poison pill clauses as "particularly troubling". However, One Bad Egg wanted to fill the "vacuum" left by other publishers turning away from the new edition and produce content using the GSL. One Bad Egg was created as a separate legal entity from Evil Hat Productions to protect Evil Hat from the poison pill clauses within the GSL.

Greg Tito, for The Escapist in 2011, highlighted that the GSL "released in conjunction with 4th edition took away many of the freedoms that the industry had come to expect with the D&D rules, such as reprinting text for clarity in new products". Andy Collins, a Dungeons & Dragons designer who became the "Design & Development Manager around the release of 4th edition", stated that:

I remember arguing pretty hard to retain something like what Wizards had done for 3rd edition; an open license that included the core rules and a few basic guidelines on how to use it. I argued that without some kind of OGL, Wizards risked leaving behind the body of customers and potential customers who saw the open license as an assumed part of the D&D. [...] In hindsight, I wonder if it might simply have been better to [let the OGL die] rather than guilting the company into crafting a Frankenstein's monster of an open license that ended up pleasing basically nobody.

Mordicai Knode, for Tor.com in 2012, highlighted that the Pathfinder Roleplaying Game (which used the older license) played a central part in the "edition wars". Knode wrote that, "though Paizo didn’t take sides, it never the less provided a convenient flag those who found the Fourth Edition lacking to rally around. The third party publishing agreement for the Fourth Edition—the Game System License—didn't help matters. It had a 'poison pill' clause that prevented anyone using it from publishing under the old license—effectively forcing anyone who wanted to publish third-party Fourth Edition supplements to stop publishing anything compatible with the Third Edition. Wizards of the Coast ended up removing a lot of the more restrictive language in the end, but the damage was done".

Academics Benoît Demil and Xavier Lecocq, in the economic journal Revue d'économie industrielle in 2014, stated that "it is noticeable that the new GSL is incompatible with the previous OGL as many publishers suggest this restriction represents a direct attack on the OGL which WOTC is legally unable to revoke. This restriction has fostered some negative feelings within the RPG communities against the leader and resulted in many publishers who previously supported the d20 system to reject the 4th Edition of D&D entirely. As a consequence, a lot of publishers which were previously adopters of the d20 system decided to develop their own set of rules based on elements of the OGL and publishing their own material under the OGL".

Bob Byrne, for Black Gate in 2015, commented that the GSL "drove out nearly all third party producers for the to-be short-lived 4th Edition. Two of them, Goodman Games and Mongoose Publishing, signed on for 4th Edition, though to not much benefit for themselves. [...] Necromancer effectively packed it in, while Paizo created Pathfinder to compete directly with Wizards' new version of Dungeons & Dragons".
