= Spirit of the Century =

Tabletop role-playing game in the pulp genre

- Spirit of the Century cover
- Designers: Fred Hicks, Rob Donoghue, Leonard Balsera
- Publishers: Evil Hat Productions
- Publication: 2006
- Genres: Pulp
- Systems: FATE

Spirit of the Century is a pulp role-playing game published by Evil Hat Productions, and based on Evil Hat's FATE system. It is billed as a 'pick-up' game that can be played quickly, with little preparation.

== Gameplay ==
Spirit of the Century is a pulp action game. The gorilla in a biplane on the cover is one of the sample player characters.

=== Setting ===
The game is set in the pulp era of the 1920s. Player characters are 'Centurions': 'potent individuals of action', born on the first day of the century, and endowed with extraordinary skills and abilities, much like Warren Ellis's conception of Century Babies in the Wildstorm comics universe. It has been released under the OGL with a freely accessible System Reference Document.

Part of the setting is created in character generation; all characters have ten free-form aspects that have an effect on the game and on the world. Each character gains two aspects from their background, two from what they did in the Great War, and a further two from the stories that would make up an imaginary novel about their life before the game started. They then get a further four aspects by guest starring in two of the other PCs' novels for two aspects apiece.

=== Rules ===
Spirit of the Century uses the Fate 3 engine, meaning that all rolls are made by rolling four Fudge dice and adding the character's skill to find the outcome. In addition to the skills, all characters have aspects that can be invoked at the cost of a Fate Point for a bonus or compelled by the GM to gain a Fate Point in exchange for doing something bad for the character (such Fate Points may be refused at the cost of a further Fate Point). Also all characters have a number of stunts that represent things they can do that go above and beyond normal capabilities.

== Development ==
The game marks the first appearance of Evil Hat's FATE 3rd Edition, which was also designed for Evil Hat's The Dresden Files Roleplaying Game. According to Shannon Appelcline, game designer Leonard Balsera provided vital support to Rob Donoghue, the main designer working on Spirit of the Century.

== Reception ==
It was released to positive reviews, quickly reaching #1 on RPGnet's rankings. Spirit of the Century won the 2006 Indie RPG Award for Independent Game of the Year and also won the 2007 Silver ENnie Award for Best Rules.

Co-author Fred Hicks claims that as of early 2009, Spirit of the Century had sold 3,313 copies in a mix of PDF and print. while by Q3 2013 they had sold 11,711 units.

== Reviews ==
Pyramid
