= Fred Hicks =

American role-playing game designer

- Occupation: Game designer

Fred Hicks is a game designer who has worked primarily on role-playing games. He was one of the founders of Evil Hat Productions.

== Career ==
=== 1999-2010 ===
Fred Hicks discovered the Fudge role-playing game system through the internet and used it for his games based on The Chronicles of Amber by Roger Zelazny. Hicks had also been running LARPs at AmberCon NorthWest with his friends Lydia Leong, Rob Donoghue, and others starting in 1999, and they came up with the name Evil Hat for themselves.

Following a trip to Lake Tahoe, Hicks and Donoghue discussed fixing certain issues they had with Fudge in order to run an Amber game. As a result, they developed Fate and published it as Evil Hat Productions. Donoghue and Hicks published a full first-edition of Fate in January 2003 through Yahoo! Groups, and then polished the technical writing and game system for a more comprehensive second edition, published in August 2003.

Hicks and Donoghue began work on the licensed The Dresden Files Roleplaying Game in 2004, but publication was delayed because Hicks decided to use Spirit of the Century to introduce the Fate 3.0 system instead. Hicks worked on the indie role-playing game Don't Rest Your Head (2006) as a side-project while working on these other games, which became the first published game from Evil Hat.

In 2008, Hicks and Donoghue formed the company One Bad Egg with Chris Hanrahan and Justin D. Jacobson to publish PDFs for Dungeons & Dragons 4th edition. Brennan Taylor of Indie Press Revolution hired Hicks as a part-time member of staff; Ron Edwards felt that this move made IPR less friendly to the small press publishers it was intended to serve, so Edwards left IPR.

Hicks provided layout work on Starblazer Adventures (2008) for Cubicle 7, as well as much editorial work. Hicks also did layouts for the sixth edition of Hero System (2009). In September 2009, Hicks announced that One Bad Egg was closing down.

By 2010, The Dresden Files Roleplaying Game was finally released. That same year, Hicks identified the science-fiction game Diaspora (2009) from VSCA Publishing as one of his favorites, and reprinted the game through Evil Hat with wider distribution.

=== 2010-Present ===
In 2024, Hicks began development on a Tomb Raider tabletop role-playing game for Evil Hat. In an interview with Charlie Hall for Polygon, Hicks compared the game to Evil Hat's previous licensed products:

We have this really curious thing at Evil Hat where generally anything licensed that we’ve done [...] the licensors have sought us out [...] This was true with The Dresden Files Roleplaying Game that was the inception of the company in the first place. Crystal Dynamics emailed us one day, and [...] when an opportunity like that comes knocking you take it seriously.
