= Do: Pilgrims of the Flying Temple =

- Cover
- Designers: Daniel Solis
- Publishers: Evil Hat Productions
- Publication: 2011
- Genres: Martial Arts
- Systems: Custom

Do: Pilgrims of the Flying Temple is a slapstick collaborative storytelling game, produced through Kickstarter in 2011. In it characters are pilgrims trying to help people while they themselves get into trouble. The mechanics are simple, involving drawing black and white stones from a bag. Its success led to a role-playing game of a similar name, "Do: Fate of the Flying Temple", published in 2016.

== The Game ==
The game comes in a 96-page book. Characters are all wandering pilgrims of "The flying temple". Every character has two attributes - some means of helping people and some way of getting into trouble - which are the two things the game is about, with the help ranging from the simple (finding a lost item) to the complex (saving the world).

== Reception ==
Reception was extremely positive, Wired declaring that it exceeded the hype and that it created an entertaining and memorable story. MTV Geek said "Being a big Wuxia enthusiast, I falsely assumed Do was a game about martial arts and kicking ass. What I soon discovered was something far more inspired than I could have possibly guessed." RPGamer declared "Do is a unique and remarkable in the world of gaming. Occupying a number of different niches in the hobby simultaneously, the game manages to be an indie story-style game, a text-based game, and it's a game specifically aimed at a young audience. Despite these limitations it remains a game everyone should play this game. It's absolutely wonderful in all respects." Flames Rising gave particular praise to the setting; "Solis introduces a world of, well, worlds upon worlds. Worlds upon the backs of fish float by worlds small enough to be unknowingly devoured by said fish. The characters are pilgrims answering the calls (letters actually) of those in need of help. Help may mean something simple (find my mother’s engagement ring) to complicated (save my mother from the belly of a giant planet-eating turtle)."

== Sequel: The Fate of the Flying Temple ==
The success of this game encouraged the designer and Evil Hat Productions to develop a more complex role-playing game based on the same universe, named "Do: The Fate of the Flying Temple". Its mechanics are based on the Fate RPG game system, although with a special focus on non-violence.
