= Return to Dark Tower =

2022 board game

- Designers: Rob Daviau; Isaac Childres; Noah Cohen; Brian Neff; Justin D. Jacobson; Tim Burrell-Saward
- Illustrators: Qistina Khalidah; Garrett Kaida; Jason D. Kingsley
- Publishers: Restoration Games
- Publication: 2022
- Genres: Board game; Role-playing game; Cooperative gameplay
- Players: 1–4
- Playing time: 100–120 minutes
- Skills: Tactics; Cooperation; Logistics; Resource management

Return to Dark Tower is a board game for one to four players, designed and published by Restoration Games. The game is a sequel to the 1981 board game Dark Tower, by Milton Bradley Company. Return to Dark Tower has players cooperate or compete as they rule over kingdoms surrounding the titular Tower, with their chosen "heroes" gathering resources, defeating monsters and enhancing their strength. As the game progresses, the Tower dispenses corruption across the land, which players must cleanse, while also looking to identify the foe inhabiting the Tower, so that they may defeat it, to win the game. Return to Dark Tower features a circular mat that is sectioned into quarters, to represent the kingdoms, with a Bluetooth-powered Tower at the center, which is connected to an app that runs the game.

Return to Dark Tower was designed by a team of board game industry veterans - most notably the creator of Gloomhaven, Isaac Childres and the creator of Pandemic: Legacy, Rob Daviau. The game was in development for three years prior to the launch of a crowdfunding campaign on Kickstarter in January 2020. The Kickstarter campaign proved to be successful, with over $4 million raised, against a goal of $850,000. Return to Dark Tower was released in 2022. In August 2022, a second printing of Return to Dark Tower raised $2 million on BackerKit.

== Gameplay ==
The premise of Return to Dark Tower is that the Tower, which was once destroyed, has been rebuilt over many years by an unknown evil and now threatens to corrupt all the land. The central objective of the game is for the players to repel the attacks from the Tower, to identify the foe inside and to break in and kill it. One to four players take up position around a circular game mat representative of the realm, with a plastic electronic obelisk, representative of the Tower, situated at the center. The Tower is connected via Bluetooth to an app that prompts it to move with certain in-game events, as well as virtually organize and run the whole game. Players are given command over their kingdom that includes their quarter of the game mat, complete with fortresses, communities and locations, which may produce economic resources or be the sites for quests and battles. Each player controls a character called a "hero", who may traverse between locations with every turn and retains special starting items and scale-able abilities dictated by a special card. At the end of their turn, the player is to insert a plastic skull - representative of corruption - into an opening at the top of the Tower. When the skulls are released into a kingdom by the Tower, the kingdom's player must allocate them onto their structures and look to use their turns to battle the corruption. The skulls may be released either immediately or when a player is tasked with opening a compartment in the side of the Tower, causing the corruption to be released en masse. Players are allotted with an amount of turns representative of six months - the game becomes increasingly challenging, with more quests to complete, while also contending with the flow of corruption out of the Tower. If the Tower becomes too powerful and overwhelms the kingdoms, the game is lost. Return to Dark Tower features cooperative and competitive game modes, with mindfulness pertaining to the others' kingdoms being crucial. A Standard game typically lasts between 100 and 120 minutes.

== Development ==
The original electronic board game Dark Tower was released by Milton Bradley Company in 1981. A strictly competitive game, Dark Tower pits up to four players against one another, with each player controlling a kingdom identical to the others, encompassing a quarter of the circular map board. At the center of the board is the battery-powered Tower, which contains a small membrane keyboard beneath a carousel that features a backlit display, depicting any number of pictures. Commanding a single hero game piece for their kingdom, each player inputs their actions and movements into the keyboard, followed by the Tower dictating what events will transpire. If the game determines that the player will face combat, the carousel will rotate and illuminate a picture associated with a foe and the game will determine if the battle is successful and how many troops the players has lost. After each turn, the Tower rotates, assigning consequences to different kingdoms. To win the game, players must obtain three keys within their kingdom, muster their forces and overcome the Tower itself in an attack. Though Milton Bradley was the third-largest toy manufacturer in the United States at the time of the Dark Tower's release, sales had slowed down, motivating the company to invest heavily in the game's success. Milton-Bradley invested between $750,000 to $1 million in developing the computer technology and programming to run the Tower. As such, Dark Tower was sold at between $55 and $65 - a price significantly higher than most board games. Despite its costs, Dark Tower was a critical success, with it being one of the most sought-after toys of 1981.

Return to Dark Tower was designed by a team working at Restoration Games, a company founded in 2016 that specializes in restoring out-of-production board games, generally with new features and technology support added. Restoration Games president Justin D. Jacobson stated in an interview that he contacted the creators of the original Dark Tower and reached an agreement that would allow for Restoration Games to move forward with developing and publishing a sequel. In addition to Jacobson, Noah Cohen and Brian Neff, the designers of Return to Dark Tower included Isaac Childres and Rob Daviau, the lead designers of Gloomhaven and Pandemic: Legacy, respectively—two of the most-popular modern board games. Prior to the launch of the project's crowdfunding campaign in January 2020, Return to Dark Tower was in development for three years, with an emphasis upon modifying the rules to focus on cooperation, as well as developing the game's technology. The sequel's tower design was led by Tim Burrell-Saward, designer of connected tabletop game Beasts of Balance, and required extensive research and testing to allow for layers of interior chambers that spin and hatches lining the compartments intended to store skulls. Likewise, the development team was challenged with developing the app software necessary for connecting with the Tower via Bluetooth technology and coordinating the game's mechanics. In August 2018, following their successful Kickstarter campaign for the restoration of Fireball Island, Restoration Games announced Return to Dark Tower, along with their intentions to fund it through crowdfunding, as well.

Restoration Games launched the Kickstarter campaign for Return to Dark Tower on January 14, 2020. In addition to the base game, a number of other rewards were available, including the two expansions, Alliance and Dark Horde, featuring new playable heroes and miniature figurines. Within four hours, the project was successfully funded for $850,000. By the conclusion of the campaign on February 4, 2020, over $4 million was raised. In 2022, a second printing of Return to Dark Tower was printed after crowdfunding over $2 million on BackerKit.

== Reception ==
James Palmer, writing for Smithsonian, called it one of the best board games of 2022, stating that "the appeal of a big old tower that makes strange noises hasn’t gone away."
