= Dark Tower 2 =

Dark Tower 2 may refer to:

- The Dark Tower II: The Drawing of the Three, the 1987 sequel to the 1982 novel The Dark Tower: Gunslinger
- Return to Dark Tower, the upcoming sequel to the 1981 board game Dark Tower
