= Farscape (role-playing game) =

Tabletop role-playing game

Farscape Roleplaying Game
- Farscape Roleplaying Game
- Designers: Ken Carpenter, Rob Vaux, Keith R. A. DeCandido, Gavin Downing, Lee Hammock, Kelly Hill, Christina Kamnikar
- Publishers: Alderac Entertainment Group
- Publication: 2002
- Genres: Science fiction
- Systems: d20 System

The Farscape Roleplaying Game is a role-playing game based on the television series, Farscape, published by Alderac Entertainment Group. Besides featuring characters and planets from the show, the game added a few more not seen onscreen. There was also an original story entitled "Ten Little Aliens," written by Keith R.A. DeCandido, who had authored the Farscape tie-in novel House of Cards.

== History ==
The Farscape RPG (2002) was a role-playing game based on the d20 System as an adaptation of the TV series, and was the first d20-based RPG from Alderac Entertainment Group. AEG never supported the Farscape game, and the show was cancelled not long after.

== Reception ==
The game was nominated for ENnie awards for Best Graphic Design and Layout and Best d20 Game in 2003.

== Reviews ==
- Pyramid
