= BackerKit =

US-based crowdfunding platform

- Website type: Creative crowdfunding
- Founded: 2012
- Country of origin: United States
- Founders: Maxwell Salzberg and Rosanna Yau
- Website: https://www.backerkit.com/

BackerKit is a crowdfunding platform focusing on creative projects with an emphasis on tabletop games and fantasy books. On ethical grounds, BackerKit bans projects containing art produced by Generative AI.

== History ==
BackerKit was founded in 2012 by Maxwell Salzberg and Rosanna Yau as a pledge management, payment processing, shipping, audience engagement, and pre-order tool for Kickstarter campaigns. In 2018, Backerkit established The Creative Fund, with the goal of donating one dollar to a wide range of projects on Kickstarter.

In 2022, BackerKit announced its own crowdfunding marketplace in response to criticisms within the tabletop role-playing game industry against Kickstarter's investment in Blockchain. The first major crowdfunding campaign on BackerKit was for Gloomhaven's Grand Festival, which raised over $5 million. Other early successes included Return to Dark Tower ($2 million) and Spirit Island: Nature Incarnate ($1.2 million).

In 2024, the premium edition of Brandon Sanderson's novel Words of Radiance raised over $23 million on BackerKit, breaking the platform's record.
