= Designers & Dragons =

Book by Shannon Appelcline

- Author: Shannon Appelcline
- Publisher: Mongoose Publishing
- Publication date: 2011

Designers & Dragons is a non-fiction book series by Shannon Appelcline about the history of the tabletop role-playing game (TTRPG) industry from its inception in the 1970s through the early 2000s. It focuses on the writing, development, and production of TTRPGs from an economic history perspective, with detailed information on the internal workings of publishing companies. It also traces the development of TTRPGs alongside the fantasy literary genre. It has won ENNIE Awards.

== Publication history ==
The first version of Designers & Dragons was published in 2011 by Mongoose Publishing. Appelcline later wrote an expanded four-volume version, Designers & Dragons: A History of the Roleplaying Game Industry. It was published in 2014 by Evil Hat Productions, with one volume dedicated to each decade from the 1970s to the 2000s.

== Reception ==
=== Awards ===
The original edition won a Judges' Spotlight ENNIE Award in 2012. The expanded edition won a Gold ENNIE Award in 2015 for "Best RPG-Related Product." It was also nominated in 2015 for "Best Writing" and "Product of the Year."

=== Reviews ===
René Reinhold Schallegger wrote that for his 2018 book The Postmodern Joy of Role-Playing Games: Agency, Ritual and Meaning in the Medium, one of the central texts for the chapter "Generations: The Origins and Development of RPGs" was the original volume of Designers & Dragons, a

comprehensive chronological collection of major RPG publishing houses and their games [...] Appelcline takes a production-oriented approach, chronicling the development of the people who make RPGs and their companies" and that his "detailed content should provide a satisfactory insight into the evolution of the medium in form and content beyond D&D.

Troy Leaman in his 2016 book Playing for Change: FreeMarket and the Rise of Serious Tabletop Role-Playing Games noted how the two volumes on the 1990s and the 2000s "discuss the legal battles and rulings that determined that system mechanics could not be copyrighted." The 2018 book Role-Playing Game Studies: Transmedia Foundations posits that the series:

true to the intertwining of RPG fandom and scholarship [...] produced substantial historiographies of the emergence and evolution of TRPGs and RPGs more generally [...] Appelcline details the fortunes of the myriad TRPG publishers that emerged, decade by decade, in the wake of D&D's publication.

Patrick Holleman, in his 2019 book Reverse Design: Diablo II, recommended Appelcline's work, "If you're looking for a longer explanation of RPG design history". Curtis D. Carbonell in his 2019 book Dread Trident: Tabletop Role-Playing Games and the Modern Fantastic wrote that

the broad category of RPGs has been subjected to a considerable amount of critical commentary. ... Jon Peterson's Playing at the World (2012) and Shannon Appelcline's Designers and Dragons (2015) both offer expansive histories of TRPGs. What ties these works together is fantasy's seminal role in opening horizons of possibility for new technological-driven world creation and subject formation.

Matthew B. Caffrey Jr. wrote in his 2019 book On Wargaming: How Wargames Have Shaped History and how They May Shape the Future that

For the most comprehensive history of not only the birth of Dungeons & Dragons but the role-playing industry itself see Shannon Appelcline's four-title Designers & Dragons series [...] It is also a good history of print and miniatures wargame publishers.

Matthew Ryan Williams for Wired wrote that

Shannon Appelcline's four-book series Designers and Dragons presents an incredibly detailed look at the history of tabletop roleplaying games, featuring profiles of more than a hundred companies, including TSR, Wizards of the Coast, and White Wolf. [...] For each article, Appelcline gathered as much information as he could from magazines and websites, then ran his research past people who had actually worked at the companies in question. [...] Along the way he discovered that the history of tabletop gaming is full of confrontations, betrayals, and scandals, which makes Designers and Dragons a surprisingly lively read.

Dimitra Nikolaidou wrote in the 2020 book War Games: Memory, Militarism and the Subject of Play that

According to Shannon Appelcline's (2013) exhaustive historical treatise Designers and Dragons, the story of roleplaying games is the story of two different trends coming together: one concerning wargames, the other reflecting the new-found love for fantasy that flourished with the sudden US success of Lord of the Rings in the 1960s.

Gerald Nachtwey wrote in his 2021 book Strictly Fantasy: The Cultural Roots of Tabletop Role-Playing Games, notes Designers & Dragons' "special attention paid to things like intellectual property rights, marketing, and distribution", adding that the book "highlights an important fact: however much role-playing games might constitute a labor of love, from their earliest conception they were mined for their profit-making potential." Ben Riggs in his 2022 book Slaying the Dragon: A Secret History of Dungeons & Dragons wrote that "when I was assigned to write an article titled “Did You Know that Wizards of the Coast DIDN'T Originally Make Dungeons & Dragons?" for Geek & Sundry, wrote:

I felt like I knew the exact story I was going to tell about the company's fall. I'd lived through it and read Shannon Appelcline's excellent Designers & Dragons, which touched on the topic. [...] According to RGP historian Shannon Appelcline, "Back in 1978, Gygax had decided that it was best if the players did not know the rules." [...] Thanks to Shannon Appelcline, for his ambitious and clear-cutting work in RPG history.

Stu Horvath in his 2023 book Monsters, Aliens, and Holes in the Ground, Deluxe Edition: A Guide to Tabletop Roleplaying Games from D&D to Mothership wrote that the book was "critical in the writing this book" for "getting my facts straight" and that it "should be the first stop for anyone desiring to read about the history of the RPG hobby." Benjamin Joseph Munise in his 2023 PhD thesis "Roleplaying Games and Performance" wrote that the series

combined archival documents and interviews to assemble portraits of significant game designers and the shape of the TTRPG industry over four decades, from the 1970s through the 2000s.

Scott Michael Bruner in his 2023 PhD thesis "Agential Fantasy: A Copenhagen Approach to the Tabletop Role-Playing Game" wrote that "Jon Peterson and Shannon Appelcline's historical scholarship provides the record of the emergence of the TRPG." Bruner stated that compared to Jon Peterson's Playing at the World (2012), "Appelcline's Designers & Dragons series (2014- 2015) is an equally valuable record of the history of TRPG companies, creators, and philosophies of design."
