= Diaspora (role-playing game) =

Diaspora is a "Hard" Sci-fi role-playing game based on the FATE engine from Evil Hat Productions.

== History ==
VSCA Publishing of Canada released the first edition of the science-fiction game, Diaspora in 2009. The game used the third-edition of FATE. Diaspora was one of the FATE games to include a method for players to create a campaign by working together, and its rules for creating new worlds in space collaboratively were extensive. Fred Hicks considered Diaspora one of his favorites, and used his Evil Hat Productions to republish the game in 2010 to release it into wider distribution.

== Reception ==
M Harold Page commented for Black Gate that "Diaspora uses the Fate mechanics to abstract elements of SF adventure, making it easy to — say — run a political campaign on a planet, or fight a space battle, and still preserve some sense of realism." Page then reviewed Diaspora and stated that "Buy Diaspora if you want to enjoy exploring a Hard Science Fiction universe and don't have much patience for fat rule books and fiddly minutiae."

Diaspora won the 2010 Gold ENnie Award for "Best Rules".
