= Interstellar Elite Arctic Combat =

Interstellar Elite Arctic Combat is a 1991 role-playing supplement for Interstellar Elite Combat published by Game Masters Associated.

== Contents ==
Interstellar Elite Arctic Combat is a supplement in which battle in Dome Number Nine is conducted in an Alpine climate or colder.

== Reception ==
Allen Mixson reviewed Arctic Combat in White Wolf #33 (Sept./Oct., 1992), rating it a 4 out of 5 and stated that "Format, content, printing and art are excellent. Rules are understandable and statistics are clean and uncluttered. Many items in the module, let alone the dome, can cross over into other game worlds. I recommend this booklet. As a first supplement to Interstellar Elite Combat, Arctic Combat is a good example of a new company turning out a quality product."
