= Kill puppies for satan =

2001 indie role-playing game

kill puppies for satan is an indie role-playing game first published in 2001.

== Description ==
In kill puppies for satan, characters kill puppies and other pets and wild animals to gain "evil points", which they can use to cast spells, perform rituals, and engage in other evil acts. Players portray people who do evil things (like killing puppies) so that Satan will give them supernatural powers.

== Style ==
The manual is flippant, full of profanity, and excludes the use of both capitalization and art. Character generation takes around two minutes and includes scores such as how many people hate the player's character. The manual suggests a way to start that avoids the storyteller having to come up with a creative way to force the players to cooperate.

== Publication history ==
Vincent Baker quit a job to allow his wife Meguey Baker to keep working, and he released his anger about this hated job in the form of the role-playing game kill puppies for satan (2001), the first game design he released to the public. Baker described the game as a "scream of rage" regarding the condition of role-playing game development as he saw it at the time, and did not playtest it as he intended the game as a political statement rather than a game meant to be played. Baker also authored a supplement to kill puppies for satan named cockroach souffle (2002). Members of the website The Forge encouraged him to sell the game, so Baker put kill puppies for satan into a PDF and started to sell it at the end of 2002, adding "lumpley" email addresses and URLs to the game; Baker had used the name Lumpley on online systems previously and he soon made it the name of his indie publishing company, making kill puppies for satan the first game for Lumpley Games. kill puppies for satan resulted in significant hate mail, and Baker reprinted much of it and mocked it on his website; this actually created publicity for game, encouraging Baker to print copies of the game which he sold at Gen Con Indy 2003.

It is no longer available in print or as an individual PDF, but is currently available as part of a collection of other Lumpley Games PDFs.
