= Ed Cha =

American role-playing games author

- Occupations: role-playing games author, video games licensing executive

Ed Cha is an American role-playing games author.

== Career ==
In 2004, Ed Cha co-founded Indie Press Revolution with Brennan Taylor of Galileo Games. Previously, Cha had founded Open World Press, publisher of the "World of Whitethorn" series of adventure settings for the d20 system. In 2010, Hero Games purchased Indie Press Revolution from Taylor and Cha.

"World of Whitethorn 1B: The Village of Oester" was nominated for an ENnie for "Best Adventure of the Year" in 2005. He stepped down as chairman of Indie Press Revolution in 2006.
