= Blades in the Dark =

Fantasy tabletop role-playing game

- Cover art by John Harper
- Designers: John Harper
- Publishers: Evil Hat Productions
- Publication: 2017
- Genres: Fantasy
- Systems: Forged in the Dark
- Playing time: 2 - 6 hours
- Chance: Dice rolling
- Skills: Role-playing, improvisation
- Website: EvilHat.com

Blades in the Dark is a fantasy tabletop role-playing game by John Harper, set in a fictional city of Doskvol, inspired by Victorian London and Gothic fiction. The game was crowdfunded on Kickstarter in 2015 and published at the start of 2017.

== Description ==
Blades in the Dark is a narrative-driven tabletop role-playing game (TTRPG). Players take on the roles of a crew of criminals who perform various illegal activities (called "scores") such as heists, assassination, or smuggling. The default setting, Doskvol, is an industrial city where the sun has died and the dead come back as ghosts and vampires.

Each player character is assigned a "playbook" or character class. Players direct their characters' actions and resolve challenges by rolling a pool of six-sided dice. In addition to their attributes, characters have a number of other statistics, including their level of stress, which can be increased to improve roll outcomes or negate the consequences of failed rolls. However, accumulating too much stress can lead to a character becoming traumatized, which can eventually result in the character being removed from play.

The crew also has its own separate playbook, which provides special abilities for all player characters. The crew playbook tracks various statistics, including the crew's wealth, reputation, and the amount of attention drawn from law enforcement.

A session of Blades in the Dark typically consists of the characters completing a score, followed by a period of downtime. Although player characters create a plan in the game's narrative, the players themselves do not prepare for a score ahead of time. Instead, the game master places players near the beginning of a score's execution, and players can represent their characters' planning through the use of flashbacks. After a score, characters can engage in several downtime activities, such as acquiring assets for future scores, recovering from injuries, or indulging in a vice such as drug use or gambling in order to reduce stress.

== Publication history ==
A crowd funding campaign began on March 9, 2015, against a goal of $7,500. Within one day the project had been fully funded. Over the course of the one-month period of the campaign a further twenty-three stretch goals were met, consisting of additional playbooks, campaign resources and full reskins of the game. When the campaign ended on April 9, it had raised a total $179,280 from 3,925 backers.

Early access sales were opened for the digital version in early 2016 and the final version was released on January 30, 2017.

In 2024, Harper released the expansion Blades in the Dark: Deep Cuts, which added new game mechanics and setting details to the base game.

An official supplement titled Blades '68 released in 2026. The supplement is designed by Tim Denee in consultation with John Harper. It features an updated setting 100 years in the future, as well as revised & expanded game systems.

== Forged in the Dark ==
A Creative Commons licensed System Reference Document was released in December 2017 and allows people to use the "Forged in the Dark" game system for other games. Evil Hat Productions has published several Forged in the Dark games, including Band of Blades (John LeBoeuf-Little, Stras Acimovic), Scum and Villainy (John LeBoeuf-Little, Stras Acimovic), and Girl by Moonlight (Andrew Gillis). As of April 2023, Itch.io lists over 300 products tagged as "Forged in the Dark," including the games Beam Saber (Austin Ramsay), CBR+PNK (Emanoel Melo), Bloodstone (Matteo Sciutteri), Songs For The Dusk (Kavita Poduri), and Mutants in the Night (Orion D. Black).

== Television adaptation ==
In 2021 it was announced that UK-based production company Warp Films signed a development deal with John Harper to produce a television series based on Blades in the Dark. Warp Films previously produced the This Is England series and a film adaption of Everybody's Talking About Jamie.

== Reception ==
Alex Meehan for Dicebreaker named Blades in the Dark one of the best tabletop role-playing games to play in 2024.

In his 2023 book Monsters, Aliens, and Holes in the Ground, RPG historian Stu Horvath noted, "The game's default position is that failure is inherently more interesting than success ... and is deployed to encourage recklessness." Horvath also commented on the relatively short life span of characters, saying, "Too much Stress results in Trauma, so during Downtime it is wise to allow characters to relax with their vices of choice, providing short-term relief and, inevitably, long-term problems. These factors conspire to shorten any individual character's life."

Samantha Nelson for Polygon named the expansion book Blades in the Dark: Deep Cuts as one of the best new tabletop RPG books of 2024.

== Awards ==
- Winner of the 2015 Golden Geek RPG of the Year
- Winner of the 2016 Indie RPG of the Year
- Nominee for the 2018 ENNIE Awards for Best Game and Product of the Year
