= Dominion Rules =

Tabletop role-playing game system

Historical and fantasy roleplaying system
- 3.1 edition cover
- Designers: Michael Bourland, Kelly Scott and Daniel Guzetti
- Illustrators: Oksana Romanova (cover and main artist of the interior art), Doug M. Anderson, Amy K. Brown, Kari Christensen, Jeannie Seay, Gin May
- Publishers: Dominion Games
- Publication: 1999; 27 years ago (beta); 2000, April (version 1.0); 2001, July (version 2.0); 2008, April (version 3.0); 2009, May (version 3.1)
- Genres: Historical fiction and fantasy
- Languages: English
- Systems: Custom
- Website: dominionrules.org

Dominion Rules is a role-playing game system designed for historical and fantasy role-playing. It is notable in the history of role-playing games for being one of the first RPGs released under an open source (or open gaming) licence, known as the Dominion Rules Licence.

Development of the game followed an open-source-style model in which contributors, collectively known as the Dominion Games Development Team, created and published new material on the internet, often through the Dominion Games website, under the terms of the Dominion Rules Licence. The system's modular structure explicitly encouraged the creation of additional skills, spells, creatures, and rules in an attempt to establish an equivalent of the open source software model within RPG gaming.

== Game mechanics ==
Dominion Rules is a skills-based role-playing game system built around the twelve-sided die (d12). The core game mechanic is used for nearly all actions: players roll a d12 and attempt to score equal to or below the relevant skill statistic, after applying any bonuses or penalties. For example, when attacking an opponent, a character begins with their Strike statistic, adds any Strike bonus provided by the weapon being used, and subtracts penalties caused by the opponent's defensive manoeuvres or armour. A roll of 12 always results in failure and may also produce especially negative consequences.

The system is structured around three primary skill categories: combat skills, priestcraft skills, and witchcraft skills. All characters have access to combat skills. Priest-oriented characters may use abilities such as bless, consecrate, curse, defile, heal, smite, wrath, and work miracle. Characters using magic may either cast predefined spells or employ free-form magic, both of which function as specialised forms of skill use.

== Game setting ==
The Dominion Rules system is designed to be generic and does not define a specific world or campaign setting. It can be adapted to a wide variety of role-playing settings by modifying or omitting selected rules. For example, in a historical campaign, players may simply ignore the priestcraft and witchcraft rules.

== Distribution ==
Dominion Rules was one of the first role-playing games released under an open-source-style (or open-gaming-style) licence, known as the Dominion Rules Licence. The current edition of the game is distributed under version 2.01 of that licence.

The current version of Dominion Rules is available as a free download from the official Dominion Rules website. Copies of earlier editions can also be found on various websites across the internet.

== History ==
Dominion Rules Beta Release appeared in late 1999, followed by version 1.0 in April 2000. A revised edition, version 2.0, was published in July 2001. Both editions were distributed by Dominion Games, although no retail print version was ever released. Dominion Rules 2.0 received several favourable reviews.

Around 2006, Dominion Games and its website disappeared. The creators of Dominion Rules later released version 3.0 in April 2008 through the official Dominion Rules website. The new edition also received favourable reviews. The current version, 3.1, was released in May 2009, with a print-on-demand edition made available through Lulu.com.
