= Linae Foster =

- Occupation: Game production

Linae Foster was the D&D Licensing Manager at Wizards of the Coast, and part of the production staff for the fourth edition of Dungeons & Dragons.

== Career ==
Linae Foster, Licensing Manager for Dungeons & Dragons at Wizards of the Coast, and D&D Brand Manager Scott Rouse, created a new Open Gaming License (OGL) after the departure of its creator Ryan Dancey. Rouse and Foster worked on a new OGL to support the fourth edition of Dungeons & Dragons beginning in 2007. On January 2, 2008, Foster posted an update for the upcoming 4th edition version of the OGL, which would require a fee from publishers to for the right to publish books after the release of 4th edition. Later that year, Wizards laid Foster off and eliminated the Licensing Manager position.
