= Spica Publishing =

Tabletop role-playing game company

- Company type: Game Publisher
- Industry: Role-playing publisher
- Founded: 2006
- Headquarters: Milton Keynes, England
- Products: Supplements for the Traveller roleplaying game
- Website: www.spicapublishing.co.uk

Spica Publishing is a British manufacturer of role-playing games supplements, actively publishing material since 2006. It publishes supplements for the science fiction Traveller.

== History ==
Spica Publishing was founded in Milton Keynes, England, in 2006 by John Griffiths.
