= Fireball Island =

Board game

- Other names: L'Isola di Fuoco; Île Boule de Feu; Der Schatz des Vul-Khans; La Isla de Fuego
- Designers: Chuck Kennedy; Bruce Lund
- Publishers: Milton Bradley
- Publication: 1986; 40 years ago
- Genres: Board game
- Players: 2–4
- Setup time: 5 minutes
- Playing time: 45'
- Chance: High
- Age range: 7
- Skills: Dice rolling, hand management, strategizing

Fireball Island is a board game first published by Milton Bradley in 1986. The tagline is "The dimensional adventure game of pitfalls and perils!" It is set on an unexploited (by treasure hunters) tropical island, the home of the ancient idol Vul-Kar. Players progress along winding paths around the island, avoiding fireballs and trying to steal Vul-Kar's jewel and carry it to the escape boat. The game concept was originally developed by artist / toy designers Bruce Lund and Chuck Kennedy. The game was licensed to Milton Bradley by Anjar Co., an international toy licensing company and co-licensor of the game.

== Rules ==
The game mechanics in Fireball Island are moderately complex, requiring both skill and luck to win. The object of the game is to escape the island with the jewel, which must first be stolen from the top of the mountain on which Vul-Kar sits. There is only one jewel, so once a player grabs it they become the target of the others. The jewel may change hands many times during the course of a game.

== Restoration Games ==
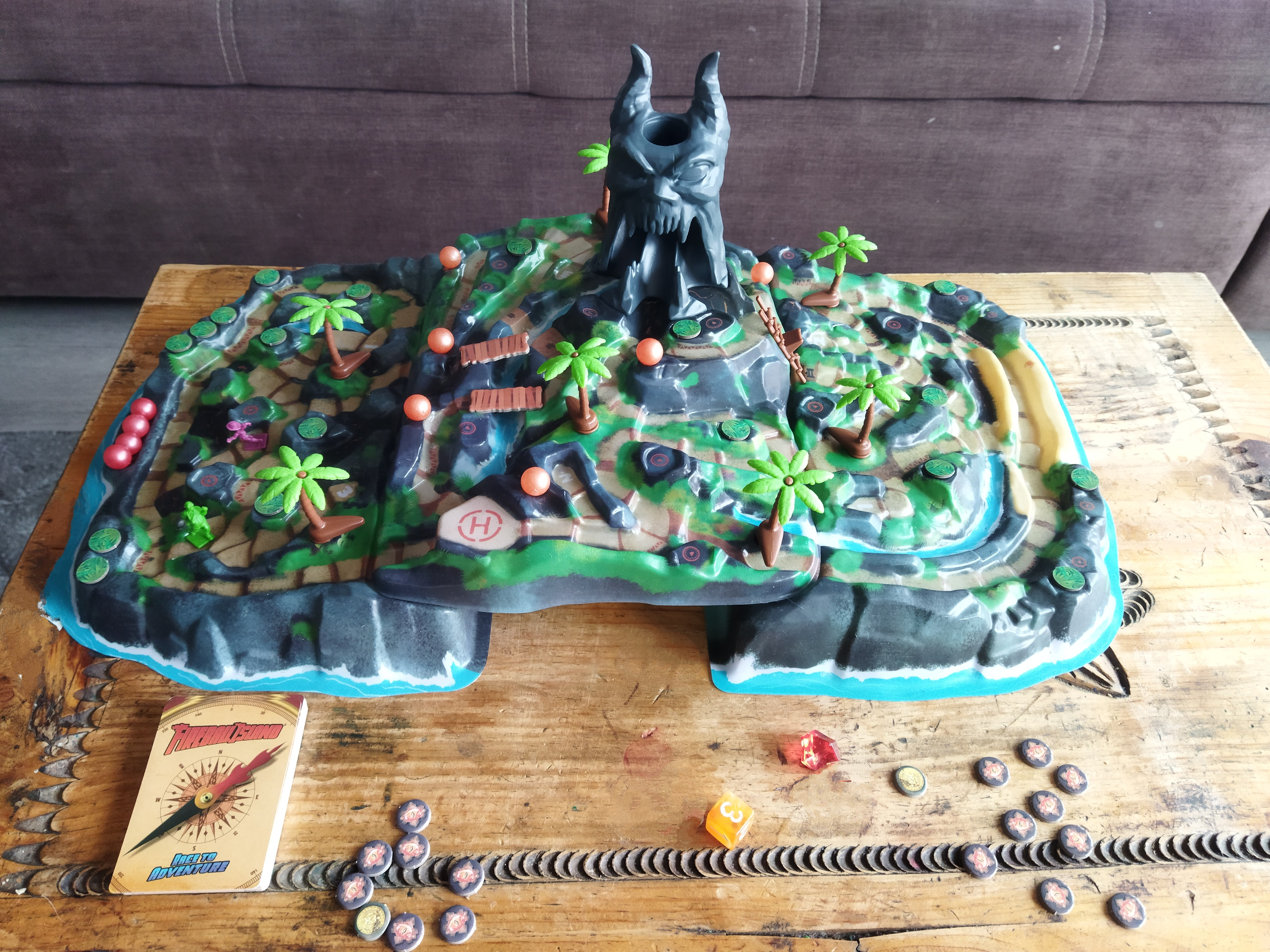
Game board and accessories

An updated version of the game has been produced by Restoration Games, a company that has previously produced restored versions of other games including Stop Thief, Downforce, and Indulgence. The game reboot is called Fireball Island: The Curse of Vul-Kar and was funded by a Kickstarter campaign which was fully funded in its first hour and raised over $2.5 million in backing. There are significant changes to gameplay, with somewhat less luck and more player agency, a redesigned and expanded board, and optional expansion content.

== Expansions ==
There are five expansions created by Restoration Games for Fireball Island: The Curse of Vul-Kar.

- Wreck of the Crimson Cutlass - Adds a pirate ship gameboard island. There are additional treasures to collect on this island and cannonballs which can be launched.
- Crouching Tiger Hidden Bees - Adds yellow bee marbles, a launching tiger, and honey pot treasures.
- The Last Adventurer - Adds green snake marbles, a 5th player, and an idol treasure.
- Treasure Trove - Adds a full deck of cards, for up to four mini-expansions. Additional cards include Injury, Hangry, Legendary Artifacts, and Bonus Souvenirs.
- Spider Springs - Adds a new section of the gameboard that attaches to the main island with a spider launcher and submarine escape route.

== Goliath Games ==
In 2021, Restoration Games partnered with Goliath Games to produce a smaller, Target-exclusive version called Fireball Island: Race to Adventure. This version has a smaller game board, smaller marbles, and less treasures to make for quicker gameplay. The expansions released by Restoration Games are not compatible with Race to Adventure, only with The Curse of Vul-Kar.
