= Indie Press Revolution =

Tabletop role-playing game publisher

- Type: Privately held company
- Industry: Role-playing
- Founded: December 1, 2004
- Founder: Ed Cha, Brennan Taylor
- Headquarters: United States
- Services: Direct sales first network of creator-publishers
- Website: indiepressrevolution.com

Indie Press Revolution (also referred to as "IPR") is a sales network that acts as a fulfillment house and distributor for publishers of indie role-playing games. It offers games directly to the public and to game retailers. Justin Joyce for Polygon recommended it for its selection of games and efficient website. Kristina Manente for Syfy called it a great resource to find indie tabletop role-playing games.

It was founded in 2004 by Ed Cha of Open World Press and Brennan Taylor of Galileo Games. IPR represents over 100 author/publishers involved in role-playing games.

On June 17, 2010 DOJ, Inc. (which also owns Hero Games) announced that they have purchased a majority share of IPR. Brennan Taylor stepped down as President. Jason Walters is now general manager, and much of IPR's energy is currently focused on expanding its convention presence, growing its retailer network, and attracting new publishers.

== Member publishers ==
The following publishers and designers distribute games through IPR as of April 2023.

- Bully Pulpit Games
- Buried Without Ceremony
- Cats of Catthulu
- Evil Hat Productions
- Far Horizons Cooperative
- Galileo Games
- Ghostly Rituals
- Lumpley Games
- Magpie Games
- Memento Mori Theatricks
- Onyx Path Publishing
- Pelgrane Press
- Sixpence Games
- Possum Creek Games
- Rowan, Rook and Decard
- TAO Games
- The Gauntlet
- Wet Ink Games
