= System Reference Document =

Set or subset of role-playing mechanics available under an open license

In the open gaming movement, a System Reference Document (SRD) is a reference for a role-playing game's mechanics licensed under a public copyright license to allow other publishers to make material compatible with that game. In 2000, Wizards of the Coast pioneered this by releasing a SRD for Dungeons & Dragons 3rd edition under their Open Game License (OGL).

Dicebreaker described a SRD as a "handy guide on how to use, hack and implement an existing game system for your own purposes".

== History ==
=== Wizards of the Coast ===
The first SRD was published in 2000 by Wizards of the Coast (WotC) and is based on the third edition of Dungeons & Dragons; it was released under their Open Game License (OGL). it was revised following the release of D&D version 3.5 in 2003. That SRD allowed for third-party publishers to freely produce material compatible with D&D. It also formed the basis for independent role-playing games from other publishers, such as Mutants & Masterminds and the Pathfinder Roleplaying Game, among others.

The 4th edition of D&D, released in 2008, was not licensed under the OGL, but under the more restrictive Game System License. Subsequently, the 4e System Reference Document is quite different. Instead of the full texts of the OGL-licensed rules, the 4e SRD presents only lists of concepts and tables from the 4e rulebooks that may be used in a compatible product.

The 5th edition of D&D was released in 2014. A new OGL-licensed SRD based on 5th edition was released in January 2016, and updated to version 5.1 in May 2016. In January 2023, Wizards of the Coast announced that the full D&D System Reference Document 5.1 (SRD 5.1) would be released under the CC-BY-4.0 license. SRD 5.2 was released on April 22, 2025.

=== Other publishers ===
Some other game systems, such as FATE, the Mongoose Publishing editions of RuneQuest, Traveller, and Zweihänder Grim & Perilous RPG have also released their own mechanics under distinct OGL-licensed "System Reference Documents".

Chase Carter, for Polygon in 2022, highlighted that the indie game design scene "has moved toward extremely permissible SRDs and the open plains of collaboration. [...] When SRDs do pop up in indie games, they read more as political statements about art and creation under capitalism". Carter commented that "independent designers are looking toward a future divested from the weight of D&D. [...] SRDs, or whatever their next form might look like, may provide fledgling artists waystones through an open field instead of fence posts around private property".
