= Galileo Games =

Role-playing games publisher

Galileo Games is a role-playing games publisher, best known for its games Bulldogs!, Mortal Coil, and How We Came To Live Here. It is the publishing imprint of Brennan Taylor, who is also the CEO of Indie Press Revolution.

The company is co-owned by Brennan Taylor (designer) and Tim Rodriguez (publisher).

== See also ==
- Indie Press Revolution
