= Lumpley Games =

Tabletop role-playing game publisher

Lumpley Games is an American game company that produces role-playing games and game supplements.

== History ==
Vincent Baker began using "lumpley" email addresses and URLs in kill puppies for satan (2002); Baker had been using the name on online systems, and then moved to use the name for his indie publishing company as well. Baker printed around 40 to 50 copies of the game and was able to sell them all, which was enough to fund his next project; according to Baker he has not put any more money into Lumpley since his initial investment. The Cheap and Cheesy Fantasy Game (2001) was the first game Baker produced that he called "a lumpley game." Lumpley Games published Baker's Dogs in the Vineyard (2004). In 2010, Baker ended the Forge booth at GenCon and instead obtained a small booth just to host himself and Lumpley Press.
