= Open World Press =

Tabletop role-playing game supplement

Open World Press is a publisher of role-playing games, founded in 2001 by Ed Cha, best known for its "World of Whitethorn" series of adventure settings. It is a member of Indie Press Revolution, a fulfillment house for publishers of indie role-playing games. Open World Press was nominated as "The Most Exciting New Company to Emerge" in 2003 by GameWyrd.

In 2005, "World of Whitethorn 1B: The Village of Oester" published by Open World Press was nominated for an ENnie as "Best Adventure of the Year". In that same year, Open World Press gave permission to author William Kooiker to publish the fantasy novel "Tower of Ruin" based on the characters and plotline in "World of Whitethorn 1B: The Village of Oester".

== List of products ==
- World of Whitethorn 1A: The Hamlet of Thumble
- World of Whitehtorn 1B: The Village of Oester

== See also ==
- Indie Press Revolution
