= Shannon Appelcline =

Tabletop role-playing game historian and editor

- Occupations: Historian; Game designer
- Notable work: Designers & Dragons
- Awards: Origins Award; ENNIE Award; Special Award - UK Games Expo
- Website: www.designers-and-dragons.com; www.erzo.org

Shannon Appelcline is a historian of tabletop role-playing games and a game designer. Two different editions of his book Designers & Dragons have won ENNIE Awards.

== Career ==
=== Game historian ===
Appelcline wrote the book Designers & Dragons on the history of the tabletop role-playing game (TTRPG) industry. The first edition was published in 2011 by Mongoose Publishing. He later wrote an expanded four-volume version, Designers & Dragons: A History of the Roleplaying Game Industry. It was published in 2014 by Evil Hat Productions, with one volume dedicated to each decade from the 1970s to the 2000s. Designers & Dragons won a Judges' Spotlight award at the 2012 ENnie Awards. The first edition also won Special Award at UK Games Expo, also in 2012. The second edition of Designers & Dragons won the Gold Ennie for Best RPG Related Product in 2015. Also in 2015, Designers & Dragons was a finalist for the Diana Jones Award.

His book on the history of the Traveller roleplaying game, titled This is Free Trader Beowulf: A System History of Traveller, was published in 2024.

Appelcline also worked for DriveThruRPG to produce histories for Wizards of the Coast products. He explained that these histories "were meant to be relatively brief, but I would often write much longer ones. Part of the reason for that was when we did the initial negotiations, they came in assuming they were going to own everything, and we managed to negotiate that they would let me keep rights on it". Appelcline stated that from 2020 to 2023, he used that work to develop a new history series titled Designers & Dragons: Origins. This series will be "a product-by-product chronicle of every item released by TSR for Original D&D, Basic D&D, and Advanced D&D 1st edition". In 2025, it was announced that the series would be funded and published by Evil Hat Productions through a crowdfunding campaign.

=== Game design ===
In the 1990s, Appelcline worked on two Call of Cthulhu RPG publications which won Origins Awards: Origins Award for Best Game Accessory of 1996 to Cthulhu for President, and Origins Award for Best Amateur Game Magazine of 1997 to Starry Wisdom.

=== Other writing ===
Appelcline is a writer and technologist as well as the vice president of Skotos Tech. He has written about emergent cultures within the games he designs. Appelcline and Christopher Allen wrote articles on the subject of how game systems work at Allen's blog, Life with Alacrity. Appelcline and Allen co-wrote a book on game design, Meeples Together: How and Why Cooperative Games Work (2019). They also co-wrote an introductory tutorial book on iPhone programming, iPhone in Action: Introduction to Web and SDK Development (2009).

== Reception ==
Shannon Appelcline's historical research on tabletop role-playing games has been recognized by scholars as foundational to the academic study of the hobby, often discussed alongside the work of Jon Peterson. The 2018 book Role-Playing Game Studies: Transmedia Foundations posits that "independent authors like Jon Peterson (2012) and Shannon Appelcline (2015) have produced substantial historiographies of the emergence and evolution of TRPGs and RPGs more generally [...] Appelcline details the fortunes of the myriad TRPG publishers that emerged, decade by decade, in the wake of D&D's publication". Gerald Nachtwey wrote, in his 2021 book Strictly Fantasy: The Cultural Roots of Tabletop Role-Playing Games, that "Appelcline's series relies on Peterson's book at many points [...] but expands on that prior work by focusing more intently on the business end of the early hobby". Nachtwey stated that "both authors manage to present a mountain of information in a very accessible, engaging format, and anyone interested in particular stages of the development of the hobby [...] will find a rich trove of resources in either work". Scott Michael Bruner, in his 2023 PhD thesis "Agential Fantasy: A Copenhagen Approach to the Tabletop Role-Playing Game", wrote that compared to Jon Peterson's Playing at the World (2012), "Appelcline's Designers & Dragons series (2014- 2015) is an equally valuable record of the history of TRPG companies, creators, and philosophies of design."

Appelcline's Designers & Dragons series has been praised for its depth, accessibility, and comprehensive documentation of the role-playing game industry. Matthew B. Caffrey Jr. wrote in his 2019 book On Wargaming: How Wargames Have Shaped History and how They May Shape the Future that, "for the most comprehensive history of not only the birth of Dungeons & Dragons but the role-playing industry itself see Shannon Appelcline's four-title Designers & Dragons series." René Reinhold Schallegger, author of The Postmodern Joy of Role-Playing Games: Agency, Ritual and Meaning in the Medium (2018), commented that "Appelcline takes a production-oriented approach, chronicling the development of the people who make RPGs and their companies" and that his "detailed content should provide a satisfactory insight into the evolution of the medium in form and content beyond D&D". Matthew Ryan Williams for Wired wrote:

Shannon Appelcline's four-book series Designers and Dragons presents an incredibly detailed look at the history of tabletop roleplaying games, featuring profiles of more than a hundred companies [...] For each article, Appelcline gathered as much information as he could from magazines and websites, then ran his research past people who had actually worked at the companies in question. [...] Along the way he discovered that the history of tabletop gaming is full of confrontations, betrayals, and scandals, which makes Designers and Dragons a surprisingly lively read.

Ben Riggs, in his 2022 book Slaying the Dragon: A Secret History of Dungeons & Dragons, called the book "excellent" and wrote "Thanks to Shannon Appelcline, for his ambitious and clear-cutting work in RPG history." Stu Horvath, in his 2023 book Monsters, Aliens, and Holes in the Ground, Deluxe Edition: A Guide to Tabletop Roleplaying Games from D&D to Mothership, wrote that Appelcline's four-volume Designers & Dragons books "were an invaluable resource for getting my facts straight and should be the first stop for anyone desiring to read about the history of the RPG hobby." Benjamin Joseph Munise wrote in his 2023 PhD thesis "Roleplaying Games and Performance" that "Shannon Appelcline's four-volume Designers & Dragons series, published by the TTRPG publisher Evil Hat Productions [...] combined archival documents and interviews to assemble portraits of significant game designers and the shape of the TTRPG industry over four decades, from the 1970s through the 2000s".
