= Fate (role-playing game system) =

Tabletop role-playing game system

FATE
- Cover art by Kurt Komoda (Same cover art used for 1st & 4th editions)
- Designers: Leonard Balsera, Fred Hicks, Rob Donoghue
- Publishers: Evil Hat Productions
- Publication: 2003 (1.0-2.0), 2006 (3.0/Spirit of the Century), 2013 (4.0)
- Genres: Tabletop role-playing game, Universal setting

Fate is a generic role-playing game system based on the Fudge gaming system. It has no fixed setting, traits, or genre and is customizable. It is designed to offer minimal obstruction to role-playing by assuming players want to make fewer dice rolls.

== Description ==
Probability of results in the Fate system.

Fate is derived from the Fudge system, primarily that earlier design's verbal scale and Fudge dice, but most versions of Fate eschew the use of mandatory traits such as Strength and Intelligence. Instead, it uses a long list of skills and assumes that every character is "mediocre" in all skills except those that the character is explicitly defined as being good at. Skills may perform one or more of the four actions: attacking, defending, overcoming obstacles (a catch-all for solving problems) or creating an advantage (see below). Exceptional abilities are defined through the use of Stunts and Aspects.

An aspect is a free form descriptor of something notable about either the character or the scene. A relevant aspect can be invoked to grant a bonus to a die roll (either adding +2, or allowed a re-roll of the dice); this usually costs the player or GM a fate point. Aspects may also be compelled to influence the setting by offering the person with the aspect a fate point (which they can refuse by spending one of their own) to put them at a disadvantage relevant to the aspect. An example given in the rule book refers to the GM invoking a player character's Rivals in the Collegia Arcana aspect to have said rivals attack them in the bath so they don't have access to their equipment. Situational aspects describe the scene, and may be created and used by the GM, or by players using the create advantage action with a relevant skill.

Stunts are exceptional abilities that grant the character a specific mechanical benefit; these may be drawn from a pre-defined list of stunts included in the rules, or created following guidelines provided by the authors. Aspects, on the other hand, are always defined by the player. For example, a player may choose to give their character an aspect of "Brawny" (or "Muscle Man" or "Wiry Strength"); during play, the player may invoke those aspects to gain a temporary bonus in a relevant situation. Aspects may also relate to a character's possessions, e.g., the character Indiana Jones for example, might have the Aspect "Whip and Fedora".

== Publication history ==
Fate was written by Fred Hicks and Rob Donoghue and was originally released through a dedicated Yahoo! group in early 2003. A much more polished edition was published by Evil Hat Productions in the summer of 2003.

=== 3rd Edition ===
A 3rd edition of Fate is used as the rules system for the RPG Spirit of the Century, which is set in the pulp magazine genre. It was nominated in 2007 for an ENnie award for Best Rules.

The 3rd edition rules also are used for the RPG Dresden Files. Several other role-playing games are built on the game mechanics of Fate 3.0.

=== Fate Core (4th edition) and Fate Accelerated Edition (FAE) ===
A 4th edition called Fate Core (again a generic version) was published in 2013, funded by a successful crowdfunding campaign, and released under two free content licenses: CC BY 3.0 and the Open gaming license. To release the new version of Fate, Evil Hat Productions ran a Kickstarter campaign that initially asked for $3,000. At the end of the campaign they raised $433,365 and expanded the product line significantly, adding two world books and a system toolkit.

As a result of another crowd funding effort, Evil Hat released Fate Accelerated, a streamlined version of the rules based on the same core mechanic intended to get players into the game faster. One notable difference is that skills are replaced with six "approaches" to solving problems - Careful, Clever, Flashy, Forceful, Quick, and Sneaky. The approaches can each use all four skill actions. Evil Hat also released Fate Condensed, a simplified version of Fate Core with minor rule changes.

== Reception ==
In his 2023 book Monsters, Aliens, and Holes in the Ground, RPG historian Stu Horvath noted compared Fate to GURPS, published twenty years earlier, saying, "Fate stands at a similar intersection, drawing from and synthesizing an array of contemporary design ideas, a kind of amalgamated avatar of the RPG industry, circa 2003, 2006, and 2013 — and growing still."

== Awards ==
In the 2003 Indie RPG Awards, Fate won a number of awards:

- First Place - Best Free Game of the Year
- First Place - Best Support
- Third Place - Indie RPG of the Year
- Recipient - Andy's Choice Award

The Fate roleplaying game has resulted in winning the following ENNIES awards:

- 2007
  - Best Rules, Silver Winner
  - Best Game, Honorable Mention — Spirit of the Century
- 2008
  - Nominated for Best Supplement — Spirit of the Season
- 2011
  - Best Game, Gold Winner
  - Best New Game, Gold Winner
  - Best Production Values, Silver Winner
  - Best Rules, Gold Winner
  - Best Writing, Gold Winner
  - Product of the Year, Silver Winner — Dresden Files Roleplaying Game
- 2014
  - Best Website, Silver Winner for Fate SRD
  - Best Aid/Accessory, Silver Winner for Eldritch Fate Dice
  - Best Family Game, Gold Winner for Fate Accelerated Edition
  - Best Game, Gold Winner for Fate Core System
  - Best RPG Related Product, Silver Winner for Strange Tales of the Century
  - Best Rules, Gold Winner for Fate Core System
  - Best Supplement, Silver Winner for Fate System Toolkit
  - Product of the Year, Silver Winner for Fate Core System
- 2015
  - Best Family Game, Silver Winner for Atomic Robo The Roleplaying Game

== Notable RPGs based on Fate ==
This list includes implementations of the Fate system as well as RPGs explicitly inspired by it.

- Age of Arthur
- Atomic Robo
- Dawning Star: Fate of Eos
- Diaspora (hard science fiction)
- The Dresden Files (pulp storytelling set against a hidden magical modern world)
- Fate of Cthulhu
- Houses of the Blooded
- Jadepunk: Tales From Kausao City
- Legends of Anglerre
- Mindjammer - The Roleplaying Game
- Spirit of the Century
- Starblazer Adventures (based on the Starblazer comics series under license from DC Thomson)

=== FATE versus Fate (naming conventions) ===
When the system was originally published FATE was considered an acronym for "Fudge Adventures in Tabletop Entertainment", then for second edition, "Fantastic Adventures in Tabletop Entertainment". Most recently FATE has changed to Fate and is no longer an acronym.
