= Open Game License =

Public copyright license for tabletop role-playing games

The Open Game License (OGL) is a public copyright license by Wizards of the Coast that may be used by tabletop role-playing game developers to grant permission to modify, copy, and redistribute some of the content designed for their games, notably game mechanics.

== Language of the license ==
The OGL states that "in consideration for agreeing to use this License, the Contributors grant You a perpetual, worldwide, royalty-free, nonexclusive license with the exact terms of this License to Use, the Open Game Content". The OGL defines two forms of content:

Open Game Content (OGC)
...the game mechanic and includes the methods, procedures, processes and routines to the extent such content does not embody the Product Identity and is an enhancement over the prior art and any additional content clearly identified as Open Game Content by the Contributor, and means any work covered by this License, including translations and derivative works under copyright law, but specifically excludes Product Identity....
Product Identity (PI)
...product and product line names, logos and identifying marks including trade dress; artifacts; creatures characters; stories, storylines, plots, thematic elements, dialogue, incidents, language, artwork, symbols, designs, depictions, likenesses, formats, poses, concepts, themes and graphic, photographic and other visual or audio representations; names and descriptions of characters, spells, enchantments, personalities, teams, personas, likenesses and special abilities; places, locations, environments, creatures, equipment, magical or supernatural abilities or effects, logos, symbols, or graphic designs; and any other trademark or registered trademark...

Use of another company's Product Identity is considered breach of the licensing agreement.

== History ==
=== 3rd Edition ===
The OGL (v1.0, soon thereafter followed by v1.0a) was originally published by Wizards of the Coast in 2000 to license the use of portions of the third edition of Dungeons & Dragons, via a System Reference Document (SRD), thus allowing third-party publishers to produce compatible material. The SRD "included the basic rules and elements of D&D, such as classes, monsters, spells, and magic items, enabling the creation of legal support products for the game". This move was spearheaded by Ryan Dancey and it was "modeled on the various open-source licenses used in the software industry". Publishers could also use the separate d20 System Trademark License to include a logo indicating compatibility. In an interview, Dancey stated:

I think there's a very, very strong business case that can be made for the idea of embracing the ideas at the heart of the Open Source movement and finding a place for them in gaming. [...] One of my fundamental arguments is that by pursuing the Open Gaming concept, Wizards can establish a clear policy on what it will, and will not allow people to do with its copyrighted materials. Just that alone should spur a huge surge in independent content creation that will feed into the D&D network.

Academics Benoît Demil and Xavier Lecocq, in the economic journal Revue d'économie industrielle, highlighted that a business goal of the OGL was to have competitors institutionalize a standardized rule system – "if WOTC could get more people in the industry to use the same system, players would learn only one system and be able to migrate from product to product and game to game without learning and transaction costs. While it would reduce the number of original gaming systems in the market, the idea was to increase the audience for everybody, especially for the leader. The ultimate goal was to establish 'd20' as a recognizable trademark, like 'VHS' or 'DVD'".

In 2004, Wizards of the Coast addressed what would occur if the license was changed – the OGL "already defines what will happen to content that has been previously distributed using an earlier version, in Section 9. As a result, even if Wizards made a change you disagreed with, you could continue to use an earlier, acceptable version at your option. In other words, there's no reason for Wizards to ever make a change that the community of people using the Open Gaming License would object to, because the community would just ignore the change anyway".

=== 4th Edition ===
In June 2008, Wizards of the Coast transitioned to a new, more restrictive royalty-free license called the Game System License (GSL), which is available for third-party developers to publish products compatible with Dungeons & Dragons 4th edition. The GSL is incompatible with the previous OGL. However, by its own terms the OGL is perpetual, and remained in widespread use.

Greg Tito, for The Escapist in 2011, commented that the GSL "released in conjunction with 4th edition took away many of the freedoms that the industry had come to expect with the D&D rules, such as reprinting text for clarity in new products". Andy Collins, a Dungeons & Dragons designer who became the "Design & Development Manager around the release of 4th edition", stated that:

I remember arguing pretty hard to retain something like what Wizards had done for 3rd edition; an open license that included the core rules and a few basic guidelines on how to use it. I argued that without some kind of OGL, Wizards risked leaving behind the body of customers and potential customers who saw the open license as an assumed part of the D&D. [...] In hindsight, I wonder if it might simply have been better to [let the OGL die] rather than guilting the company into crafting a Frankenstein's monster of an open license that ended up pleasing basically nobody.

=== 5th Edition ===
Version 5.1 of the System Reference Document, released in January 2023

On January 12, 2016, Wizards of the Coast released the 5th Edition SRD under v1.0a of the OGL, marking a return to the Open Gaming format. This SRD was later revised and rereleased as SRD 5.1 in May 2016.

Content creators can alternatively utilize a different licensing option by publishing through the Dungeon Masters Guild storefront; this license allows individuals and third party publishers to create and sell content based on specific Wizards of the Coast intellectual property such as the Forgotten Realms, Ravenloft, Eberron, and the Magic: The Gathering planes. Content creators are allowed to set their own price, however, Wizards of the Coast and OneBookShelf take a 50% cut of the proceeds.

==== Proposed OGL changes ====
In August 2022, Wizards of the Coast launched a public playtest of the next version of Dungeons & Dragons under the One D&D initiative. In November 2022, there was reported speculation that the OGL would be discontinued for this new iteration of Dungeons & Dragons based on unconfirmed leaks. In response to the speculation, Wizards of the Coast stated in November 2022: "We will continue to support the thousands of creators making third-party D&D content with the release of One D&D in 2024. While it is certain our Open Game License (OGL) will continue to evolve, just as it has since its inception, we're too early in the development of One D&D to give more specifics on the OGL or System Reference Document (SRD) at this time".

Following concerns raised by third-party Dungeons & Dragons creators on the potential changes to the OGL, in December 2022, Wizards of the Coast released additional details on the proposed OGL 1.1 which would have gone into effect in 2023. It would have clarified that it only applies to "printed media or static electronic files (like epubs and PDFs)" and "only covers material created for use in or as TTRPGs"; OGL 1.1 would not cover other content such as video games or virtual tabletops (VTTs). Content creators using OGL 1.1 would have been required "to put an official OGL badge on their products". Revenue related to OGL content would have been reported to Wizards of the Coast if that revenue exceeds $50,000 annually; creators who make at least $750,000 in income annually will be required to pay a royalty starting in 2024.

Lin Codega, for Io9 in January 2023, reported on the details from a leaked full copy of the OGL 1.1 including updated terms such as no longer authorizing use of the OGL1.0. Codega explained that while the original OGL granted a "perpetual, worldwide, non-exclusive license" it also included language around authorized versions of the license and "according to attorneys consulted for this article, the new language may indicate that Wizards of the Coast is rendering any future use of the original OGL void, and asserting that if anyone wants to continue to use Open Game Content of any kind, they will need to abide by the terms of the updated OGL, which is a far more restrictive agreement than the original OGL". The document also states that the intention of the OGL was not "to fund major competitors and it wasn't intended to allow people to make D&D apps, videos, or anything other than printed (or printable) materials for use while gaming". In a statement to EN World, Dancey, former VP of Wizards of the Coast and the architect of OGL1.0, said, "my public opinion is that Hasbro does not have the power to deauthorize a version of the OGL. If that had been a power that we wanted to reserve for Hasbro, we would have enumerated it in the license. I am on record numerous places in email and blogs and interviews saying that the license could never be revoked".

Following an apology issued by Wizards of the Coast, the company released a new draft titled OGL 1.2 for public comment on January 19. It would have put some of the Dungeon & Dragons mechanics under a Creative Commons license, while other material would have been covered by OGL 1.2. Unlike the leaked OGL 1.1, the proposed OGL 1.2 contained "no royalty payment, no financial reporting, no license-back, no registration, no distinction between commercial and non-commercial". The proposed OGL 1.2 would have de-authorized the OGL1.0a; it would also be "irrevocable, although there's still a severability clause should a part of the license is held to be unenforceable or invalid". Along with the proposed OGL 1.2, Wizards released a separate virtual tabletop (VTT) policy. On January 27, 2023, Wizards of the Coast announced that following feedback during the open comment for OGL1.2 they had decided to instead release the System Reference Document 5.1 (SRD 5.1) under an irrevocable Creative Commons license (CC-BY-4.0) effective immediately and would no longer pursue deauthorizing the OGL1.0a.

==== 2025 update ====
The SRD was revised to reflect the 2024 revision to the 5th Edition ruleset. SRD 5.2 was released under a Creative Commons license on April 22, 2025. Jess Lanzillo, VP of Franchise and Product for Dungeons & Dragons, explained that the "SRD will be part of the errata process, ensuring it is regularly updated as official clarifications and corrections are published for our Core Rulebooks. [...] Future SRDs will be published with new version numbers, allowing us to respond to how players are playing D&D and what creators are creating within the game and update the SRD with future versions".

Also in 2025, Dan Ayoub became the new head of Dungeons and Dragons. In a September 2026 interview, when asked about the 2023 OGL controversy, Ayoub stated that:

A lot of people and businesses were built up around a specific thing. Trust was given to the brand, and people rightly felt the rug was pulled from under them. In some cases, it's caused damage we are still trying to fix today. [...] My biggest takeaway as I step into this role is that trust takes a long time to build and a second to break. I'm keenly aware it's going to take me a long time to repair this, but my hope is people will give the benefit of the doubt as we continue to show that lessons have been learned.

== Reception ==
=== Open Game License ===
Those individuals, groups and publishing companies that license their works under the OGL and similar documents are sometimes collectively referred to as the "open gaming movement". The OGL led to the development of the stand-alone Pathfinder Roleplaying Game which is a modified version of the 3.5 game. James Maliszewski, for The Escapist, commented that the OGL also helped launch the Old School Revival movement and that "by 2002, the idea of using the SRD to reverse engineer the out-of-print AD&D took root on Dragonsfoot and other old school forums". Academics Benoît Demil and Xavier Lecocq, in the economic journal Revue d'économie industrielle in 2014, stated that the OGL had an immediate impact on the tabletop role-playing industry with an increase in new TTRP publications where the "majority of the new entrants adopted" the d20 license; d20 products sold at a higher rate than non-d20 products until the mid 2000s. It "was considered by WOTC's managers as a huge success due to the large movement of adoption it created among publishers". They also highlighted that the "success was amplified by the rise of electronic publishing". Christopher B. Seaman and Thuan Tran, for the academic journal Iowa Law Review in 2022, also highlighted that the release of the OGL "created a major shift in the RPG industry" and "led to a boom in the RPG industry in the early 2000s". They commented that "the emergence of open source licensing for RPGs facilitates user creativity and innovation, as dozens of D&D-compatible supplements have been created under the Open Game License".

Kit Walsh, a senior staff attorney at the Electronic Frontier Foundation in 2023, highlighted that roleplaying games have aspects that are copyrightable, such as creative expression, and aspects that are not, such as functional descriptions of game mechanics. Walsh commented that the original OGL "is very narrow" and includes "elements that are not copyrightable in the first place" – agreeing to the OGL "almost certainly means you have fewer [sic] rights to use elements of Dungeons and Dragons than you would otherwise. For example, absent this agreement, you have a legal right to create a work using noncopyrightable elements of D&D or making fair use of copyrightable elements". However, Walsh highlights the "primary benefit" is knowing the exact terms in order to not be sued by Wizards of the Coast and avoiding "having to prove your fair use rights or engage in an expensive legal battle over copyrightability in court". Walsh stated that "open licenses can involve a lot of legalese that makes them hard for a layperson to understand" and explained that "perpetual" and "irrevocable" are separate legal terms; while the OGL states it is perpetual, it does not state that it is irrevocable. In an update to the article, Walsh wrote that past statements by Wizards of the Coast make "very clear that Wizards always thought of this as a contract with obligations for both sides [...]. Unlike a bare license without consideration, an offer to contract like this cannot be revoked unilaterally once it has been accepted, under the law of Washington (where they are located) and other states". Walsh stated that works already published "under OGL 1.0a are entitled to the benefit Wizards of the Coast promised them under that contract. But Wizards can revoke the offer of the OGL 1.0a as to new potential users who haven't yet accepted its terms". Kyle Orland, for Ars Technica, highlighted Walsh's analysis and commented that the "legal situation is complicated a bit [...] by Section 9" of the original OGL as that clause states third party designers can "use any authorized version of this License to copy, modify and distribute any Open Game Content originally distributed under any version of this License". Orland stated that Section 9 coupled with statements made by Wizards of the Coast in the original 2001 FAQ, seem "to suggest that companies could continue using the old license to make products based on the old ruleset that was published under OGL v1.0a (even if upcoming rules changes are covered more directly by OGL v1.1)".

=== Leaked OGL1.1 draft ===
In November 2022, Game Rant commented that "many players are not happy with the implication" of the OGL discontinuation rumor as "tons of creators and companies have made their living on selling third-party Dungeons and Dragons homebrew. If Wizards of the Coast does not use the OGL in One D&D, many of these creators will be unable to make content for the evergreen system–or will at least have to tiptoe around the law by only using the 5th Edition SRD to do so". ComicBook.com highlighted that "while not creating a new System Reference Document for One D&D wouldn't snuff out third-party material, it would certainly discourage publishing or force publishers to turn to the DMs Guild" which "uses a separate license" and requires a 50% cut of the proceeds.

Following the statement released by Wizards of the Coast in December 2022, Christian Hoffer, for ComicBook.com, wrote: "Wizards noted that this royalty should impact less than 20 'creators,' which include major publishing companies like Kobold Press and Ghostfire Gaming". Chase Carter, for Dicebreaker, commented that "this vision of an updated OGL paves a path for Wizards of the Coast to muscle in on ultra-successful crowdfunding projects without crushing existing communities, which the blog post says are 'a critical part of the D&D experience'. It also said existing virtual tabletop agreements will not be affected by whatever shape the OGL takes, even though the company has announced their own version to launch close to OneD&D's release in 2024".

Lin Codega, for Io9 on January 5, 2023, wrote that "by ending the original OGL, many licensed publishers will have to completely overhaul their products and distribution in order to comply with the updated rules. Large publishers who focus almost exclusively on products based on the original OGL, including Paizo, Kobold Press, and Green Ronin, will be under pressure to update their business model incredibly fast". Codega highlighted that "if the original license is in fact no longer viable, every single licensed publisher will be affected by the new agreement, because every commercial creator will be asked to report their products, new and old, to Wizards of the Coast. [...] The main takeaway from the leaked OGL 1.1 draft document is that WotC is keeping power close at hand. [...] There are a lot of implications in this extended policy, and the ramifications of this updated OGL could have a chilling effect on new licensed products". Eric Law, for Game Rant, commented that this leak was causing "panic" among third-party publishers. Law stated that "the most concerning section of the legal document adds that Wizards of the Coast has full rights to any content created by the OGL. This would allow Dungeons and Dragons to take any homebrew content and publish it in official Dungeons and Dragons material without permission or compensation to the original creator". ICv2 commented that the leaked OGL has several controversial parts including prohibiting "commercial publication for virtual tabletop platforms" and that while it "grants ownership of the OGL works to their creator" it also "gives WotC the perpetual, irrevocable right to use their works in any way it sees fit without payment".

Christian Hoffer, for ComicBook.com in January 2023, stated that "if the OGL viewed by io9 is indeed the final OGL planned for One D&D, it would have seismic consequences for the thriving ecosystem that surrounds Dungeons & Dragons". Hoffer highlighted the debate on if the OGL could be deauthorized and commented that regardless, "the intent of the new OGL is to force publishers to comply with the new OGL, with its easily revocable status and its tiered royalty structure". Charlie Hall, for Polygon, commented that "if enforced as written, io9 reports, it could put revenue streams for companies like Pathfinder maker Paizo, Kobold Press, Green Ronin, and others in jeopardy". Hall also highlighted that Kickstarter negotiated with Wizards of the Coast to lower the royalty amount for creators who use their platform. Hall wrote, "Kickstarter has recently seen increased competition from alternate crowdfunding outlets, including Gamefound and Backerkit. A partnership such as this, formally enshrined into the OGL 1.1, would encourage the largest D&D crowdfunding campaigns to use Kickstarter's services".

In the days following the leak, IGN, Vice, The Guardian, Financial Times and many other industry focused outlets reported on negative reactions from both fans and professional content creators. ComicBook.com reported that it had "spoken with over 20 small to mid-sized creators who have said that in-progress projects set to be published under the OGL have been placed on hold due to" the terms in the leak. Many designers had also reported considering switching role-playing game systems entirely. As part of a grassroots campaign protesting against the reported terms of the new OGL, over 66,000 people have signed the "#OpenDND" internet petition within days of its launch. This included "several well-known D&D community members" such as "Baldur's Gate: Descent into Avernus writer M.T. Black, prominent D&D streamer Mara Holmes (who recently ran a streaming show for Wizards of the Coast on D&D's streaming channel), and Mike Shea, publisher of Sly Flourish". There was also an online movement to cancel subscriptions to D&D Beyond; Io9 reported that per their sources at Wizards "the result of these cancellations and their impact on the bottom line of Wizards of the Coast is not negligible" and led to scrambling by upper management "to adjust their messaging around the situation". Starburst commented that "historically when the owners of Dungeons and Dragons attempt to restrict what people can do with the game, it leads to a boom in other tabletop roleplaying games. This is happening right now". Both Kobold Press and MCDM Productions announced upcoming new tabletop RPG systems with both stating their respective systems would be open games. Paizo then announced a new Open RPG Creative License (ORC), an open, perpetual, and irrevocable system-agnostic license, as a direct response to the reported changes to the OGL. They stated that the license would not be owned by Paizo or any RPG publisher, to protect against future attempts to modify or rescind it. Additional publishers, such as Kobold Press, Chaosium, Green Ronin, Legendary Games, and Rogue Genius Games, stated they would join the ORC development process. Another initiative is from Free League Publishing, which announced two licenses, for its Year Zero game system and another for its upcoming fantasy RPG Dragonbane.

On January 13, 2023, Wizards issued a response via D&D Beyond; this response did not contain the updated OGL which will be released at a later date. The statement walked back several changes to the OGL such as removing the royalty structure and the license back language and indicated that other forms of expression, such as VTTs and livestreams, would not be impacted by the updated OGL. ComicBook.com commented that this statement "did not address" the OGL deauthorization concerns. Io9 believed that Wizards of the Coast could not back down completely, as the company has invested significant resources into their IP and "the suits in Hasbro will not allow" others freely use their brand and content. Io9 described Wizards of the Coast as engaging in "incredible spin doctoring" to try to recover from the backlash. Polygon highlighted that "despite" the shift in direction by Wizards, Twitter reactions remain overwhelmingly negative; they also pointed out that much remains unknown including "how a near-final draft of the revised OGL got things so very, very wrong".

=== Proposed OGL1.2 draft ===
Edwin Evans-Thirlwell, for The Washington Post, wrote that "pushback from fans, who criticized WotC's response as far from an apology and a dismissal of their legitimate concerns, led WotC to backpedal further. A second bulletin Wednesday [on January 18] included more details about the path forward, along with a mea culpa from [Kyle] Brink, the executive producer, on behalf of his team". Evans-Thirlwell highlighted the release of the proposed OGL 1.2 which will have open comment available for two weeks, however, "some say the damage is already done. [...] Whether you view the original OGL as a mystic talisman or smoke-and-mirrors, WotC appears to have committed an irreversible act of self-sabotage in trying to replace it — squandering the prestige accumulated over 20 years in a matter of weeks". Lin Codega, for Io9, wrote that "the commitment to create an irrevocable license under the Creative Commons foundation seems like a good step towards making that happen, and it would not have occurred if Dungeons & Dragons creators, influencers, fans, and third party publishers had universally come together to reject the proposed OGL 1.1". They also highlighted that Wizards continues to have "a firm stance on bigoted and hateful content—something that people praised in the leaked draft". The proposed OGL1.2 would ban "harmful, discriminatory, or illegal content" which Codega views as a good idea, however, Codega commented "in the wake of Spelljammer's inclusion and public treatment of the Hadozee, it remains to be seen if D&D is even capable of moderating this kind of content in a way that will be respectful, inclusive, and progressive".

Both Codega and Christian Hoffer, for ComicBook.com, highlighted that the proposed OGL1.2 would de-authorize OGL1.0a. Hoffer commented that de-authorization is "one major sticking point" as it is "seen as a hard line for many creators and third party publishers". Hoffer wrote that Brink framed de-authorization as necessary to enforce the "'No Hateful or Harmful Content' clause in the new OGL". Kyle Orland, for Ars Technica, stated that "aside from the OGL v1.0a deauthorization, the new draft language scales back many of the most controversial portions of the original leaked update [...]. The new draft language also explicitly notes that the new license is 'perpetual, non-exclusive, and irrevocable,' with only a few technical sections being eligible for modification in the future".

=== Creative Commons ===
On January 27, 2023, Wizards of the Coast outlined the feedback received from over 15,000 survey submissions during the open comment for OGL1.2: "88% do not want to publish TTRPG content under OGL 1.2", "89% are dissatisfied with deauthorizing OGL 1.0a", "86% are dissatisfied with the draft VTT policy" and "62% are satisfied with including Systems Reference Document (SRD) content in Creative Commons, and the majority of those who were dissatisfied asked for more SRD content in Creative Commons". As a result, Wizards decided to release the SRD 5.1 under an irrevocable Creative Commons license; it would also no longer attempt to deauthorize the OGL 1.0a. Milton Griepp, for ICv2, reported that the events had led to an overwhelmingly negative response, constituting a PR disaster for Wizards of the Coast. Griepp commented that "it remains to be seen whether the steps WotC has taken will be sufficient to unwind the moves other companies have made to disassociate themselves from the OGL, most notably Paizo".

Christian Hoffer, for ComicBook.com, stated that "this is a major change of pace for Wizards of the Coast and seems to be a surprising end to a controversy that had raged for weeks, drawing attention from mainstream news sites. It's a huge victory for the wider D&D community". Charlie Hall, for Polygon, also highlighted the major mainstream news coverage this controversy received and the possibility that it may have an impact on the success of upcoming film Dungeons & Dragons: Honor Among Thieves, scheduled for release in March 2023. Lin Codega, for Io9 in January 2023, wrote that the deauthorization of the OGL 1.0a had been a hard line for many fans so "concessions Wizards and D&D make in this announcement are huge" and that "this is a huge victory for the fans". Codega highlighted Kyle Brink, Executive Producer for D&D, who stated "that putting the entire 400-page SRD into the Creative Commons means that fans don't need to 'take [Dungeons & Dragons'] word for it.' That Brink would explicitly acknowledge the lack of trust between fans and publishers and Wizards of the Coast is incredible". In May 2024, Lin Codega now of Rascal commented that it appeared the Open Game License would not return following Wizards of the Coast's announcement that the revised 5th Edition would have an SRD released under the Creative Commons – a move they considered both "fascinating" and "sad". Codega opined:

The Open Game License was genuinely a revolutionary contract—established two years before the Creative Commons license was developed—and tabletop games across the board, not just D&D, benefited from the free and unrestricted usage granted in the OGL. The OGL should have been the contract to stand the test of time as a testament to the power of open source licensing for intellectual property. But then, as with most good things that are given away in the spirit of joyous creativity and hope for community, capitalism happened. [...] The commitment to putting the updated D&D rules into the Creative Commons rather than trying to re-establish the OGL or even establish another GSL-alike is, in my opinion, a good decision.

== See also ==
- List of OGL publishers
