= Evil Hat Productions =

Tabletop role-playing game publisher

- Type: Privately held company
- Industry: Role-playing
- Headquarters: United States
- Key people: Rob Donoghue and Fred Hicks
- Products: Fate, The Dresden Files Roleplaying Game, Blades in the Dark, Thirsty Sword Lesbians
- Website: www.evilhat.com

Evil Hat Productions is a company that produces role-playing games and other tabletop games. They are best known for the free indie RPG system Fate, Blades in the Dark, and Thirsty Sword Lesbians, all of which have won multiple awards.

== History ==
Fred Hicks had been working with Lydia Leong, Rob Donoghue, and others to run LARPs at AmberCon NorthWest starting in 1999, and came up with the name Evil Hat for themselves. While on a trip to Lake Tahoe, friends Hicks and Donoghue developed a new game based on a conversation about running another Amber game and fixing some problems with FUDGE; the result was Fate which Hicks and Donoghue would publish under the name Evil Hat. Donoghue and Hicks released a complete first-edition of Fate through Yahoo! Groups (January 2003) then cleaned up the technical writing and slightly polished the system for a second edition (August 2003). Hicks and Donoghue began work on the licensed Dresden Files Roleplaying Game in 2004, but publication was held up because they decided to use Spirit of the Century (2006) to introduce the Fate 3.0 system instead. While working on these other games, as a side-project Hicks worked on Don't Rest Your Head (2006), which would be Evil Hat's first published game. Don't Rest Your Head was critically acclaimed and quickly sold through Evil Hat's short print-on-demand print run.

In 2005, the company began producing a series of commercial role-playing games using an updated version of the Fate system, each focusing on a different genre. These include the 1920s pulp adventure Spirit of the Century and the hard sci-fi Diaspora. In 2010, they released Dresden Files Roleplaying Game, based on the Dresden Files series of novels by author Jim Butcher. The FATE system had also been licensed to Cubicle 7 Entertainment who used it for Starblazer Adventures, based on the British Starblazer comic.

Evil Hat Productions is a part of the Bits and Mortar initiative and was one of the original founding companies in August 2010.

In January 2016, Evil Hat Productions announced print-runs for some of its Fate Core System games such as Venture City (2014) and Do: Pilgrims of the Flying Temple (2011). The company then announced in September 2016 that they would be bringing both Blades in the Dark (2017) and Karthun: Lands of Conflict (2017) to trade in 2017; both games were funded via successful Kickstarter campaigns in 2015 and 2014, respectively.

In October 2018, ICv2 reported that Evil Hat was scaling back with "a total of a dozen projects [...] postponed or cut in the immediate future" along with staff reductions such as the Head of Marketing Carrie Harris and the Head of Business Development Chris Hanrahan leaving that month and Senior Art Director Brian Patterson being laid off "at the end of 2018". Game designer Alex Roberts told Polygon that her game For the Queen (2019) was "the last boxed game" released by Evil Hat as the publisher shifted to exclusively releasing books and that originally, the game was "almost on the chopping block" as it was "80% done" when the publisher made their change.

In 2019, Hicks revealed that the role-playing game Monster of the Week (2015) had a surge in sales after being featured on The Adventure Zone podcast in 2018. Hicks informed ICv2 that "interest in that same month surged to a level similar to our initial product release spike; in practically every month since, sustained interest in the game has vastly outstripped what we were able to achieve ourselves. Only one month, October 2018, dipped below the highest interest level we saw immediately following release in 2015, and was promptly followed by November 2018 where we saw our strongest sales-month ever for the product (possibly due to retailers stocking up for the holiday gifting season)". Hicks highlighted that while Fate Core System "achieved a big sales surge" after being featured in May 2017 on Geek & Sundry’s TableTop "the impact was shorter than it was for The Adventure Zone" impact on Monster of the Week. Lin Codega of Rascal highlighted that "while it was never out of stock during its four-year run at Evil Hat, after For the Queen was featured on Shut Up, Sit Down, it became exceptionally hard to find at physical distributors, according to a spokesperson from Evil Hat".

== Awards ==
Don't Rest Your Head was a runner-up for Indie Game of the Year at the 2006 Indie RPG Awards, losing to Evil Hat's Spirit of the Century. In 2007, Evil Hat won a silver ENnie Award for Best Rules and an Honorable Mention for Best Game, both for Spirit of the Century. In 2008, the game supplement Don't Lose Your Mind won the Indie RPG Awards for Indie Supplement of the Year. In 2009, Don't Lose Your Mind won the Silver ENnie for Best Writing and Swashbucklers of the 7 Skies won the Silver ENnie for Best Setting; both games were also nominated for Product of the Year.

The company won two Origins Awards in 2010 for The Dresden Files Roleplaying Game: Best Role-playing Game and Best Supplement for two books in the line. In 2011, the same game won gold ENnie for Best Game, Best New Game and Best Writing, and silver ENnies for Best Production Values and Product of the Year. The company also won the silver ENnie for Fan Favorite Publisher in 2012.

The company was nominated for the 2014 Diana Jones Award for Excellence in Gaming; the committee wrote that:

Ever since the release of Fate as a free RPG in 2003, Evil Hat Productions has aimed at two usually difficult goals: skill and elegance in game design, and professionalism and transparency in publishing. Honesty and openness about business realities, and excitement and perfectionism about game possibilities, built the Evil Hat audience from a corner of the Internet to a loyal horde numbering in the tens of thousands. [...] By co-creating Bits and Mortar, Evil Hat pioneered PDF-retailer cooperation; using the Open Game License and Creative Commons, Evil Hat built on a tradition of trusting players and designers to build better games. In 2013, Evil Hat hit both its design goals and its deadlines with Fate Core: five books Kickstarted, printed, and delivered, and over 60,000 copies sold. And Fate Core is still a free RPG.

Also in 2014, Evil Hat's Fate Core System nearly swept the ENnies, with Gold awards for Best Game and Best Rules and Silver for Product of the Year, while the related Fate Accelerated Edition won Gold for Best Family Game and the supplements and accessories Strange Tales of the Century, the Fate System Toolkit, the Fate SRD and Eldrich Fate Dice, won silver ENnies for Best RPG Related Product, Best Supplement, Best Website and Best Aid/Accessory, respectively.

In the Best Family Game category, the company won the silver ENnie in 2015 for the Atomic Robo RPG and the gold ENnie in 2017 for Bubblegumshoe. Designers & Dragons: A History of the Roleplaying Game Industry won the gold ENnie for Best RPG Related Product in 2015, and the Dresden Files Cooperative Card Game received the silver ENnie in the same category in 2018. Evil Hat won "Best Setting" in both the 2018 and 2019 Indie Groundbreaker Awards from Indie Game Developer Network, for Arecibo and The Way of Pukona.

In 2022, the team of six writers for the role-playing game Thirsty Sword Lesbians won the Nebula Award in the "Best Game Writing" category; it was the first tabletop game to win a Nebula Award. The game also won the 2022 ENNIE Awards (Note: Previously stylized as the ENnie Awards.) for "Best Game" and for "Product of the Year".

== Publications ==
=== Role-playing games ===
- Fate (2003)
  - The most recent edition is known as Fate Core (2013)
- Don't Rest Your Head (2006)
- Spirit of the Century (2006)
- A Penny for my Thoughts (2009)
- Diaspora (2009)
- Swashbucklers of the 7 Skies (2009)
- The Dresden Files Roleplaying Game (2010)
  - Dresden Files: The Paranet Papers (2015)
  - Dresden Files Accelerated (2017)
- Happy Birthday, Robot! (2010)
- Do: Pilgrims of the Flying Temple (2011)
- Atomic Robo (2014)
- Monster of the Week (2015)
- Bubblegumshoe (2016)
- Blades in the Dark (2017)
  - Deep Cuts (2024–5)
  - Blades '68 (2025)
- Karthun: Lands of Conflict (2017)
- Kaiju Incorporated Card Game (2017)
- Scum and Villainy (2018)
- Uprising: The Dystopian Universe (2018)
- Band of Blades (2019)
- Fate of Cthulhu (2020)
- Thirsty Sword Lesbians (2021)
  - Advanced Lovers & Lesbians (2022)
- Elizabethulhu
- Pace
- Texorami!
- Apocalypse Keys (2023)

=== Books ===
Fiction:

- Beyond Dinocalypse ISBN 978-1-61317-016-8
- Dinocalypse Now ISBN 978-1-61317-003-8
- Don't Read this Book ISBN 978-1-61317-012-0
- Khan of Mars ISBN 978-1-61317-018-2
- King Khan ISBN 978-1-61317-019-9
- Sally Slick and the Steel Syndicate ISBN 978-1-61317-063-2

Non-Fiction:

- Designers and Dragons: A History of the Roleplaying Game Industry Volumes I-IV (2015, 2nd Edition) (Note: First edition was produced by Mongoose Publishing.) by Shannon Appelcline

=== Board and card games ===
- Race to Adventure
- Zeppelin Attack! (2014)
- Don’t Turn Your Back (2015)
- The Dresden Files Cooperative Card Game (2017)
- Kaiju Incorporated Card Game (2017)
- Greedy Dragons (2018)
- For the Queen (2019)
