= Cortex Classic System =

Tabletop role-playing game system

Cortex System
- Designers: Jamie Chambers
- Publishers: Margaret Weis Productions
- Publication: 2005
- Genres: Role-playing game

Now most commonly referred to as "Cortex Classic," the Cortex System is a generic RPG system based on the Sovereign Stone role-playing game system,, and was developed by Margaret Weis Productions, Ltd for the Serenity Role Playing Game. It was subsequently used for their licensed Battlestar Galactica and Supernatural RPGs, and brought out as a stand-alone system in the Cortex System Role Playing Game book (also called the Cortex Classic System Role Playing Game). Serenity, using the Cortex System, was the 2005 Origins Award Gamer's Choice Role Playing Game of the Year.

In 2010, the Cortex Plus system, which evolved from the Cortex System, was released. Despite the similar name, the Cortex System is different from the Cortex Plus system, also produced by Margaret Weis Productions.

== The basic system ==
The system uses dice with 2, 4, 6, 8, 10, and 12 sides, described with the standard role-playing game notation of d2, d4, d6, d8, and so on, and the basic resolution system involves adding up the total on all your relevant dice and comparing it to a static target number. The three parts of your dice pool are your relevant Attributes (Agility, Strength, Vitality, Alertness, Intelligence, and Willpower) which range from d4 to d12+d4, your relevant Skill (from a list of 22) which range from 0 to d12, and any relevant Assets (positive character traits) or Complications (negative traits). Situational advantages can be represented either by changing the target difficulty number or increasing or reducing the number of faces on the dice rolled.

The Cortex System also uses Plot Points, which increase characters' survivability and give players greater control over events in the game. Players can spend Plot Points to gain extra dice when making a die roll, reduce the damage from an attack, or even make changes to the storyline. Some Assets also require the expenditure of Plot Points. At the end of a game session, excess Plot Points are converted to Advancement Points, which a player spends to improve his or her character's abilities.

== Character creation ==
The game uses a point-buy system with a default initial spread between attributes, skills, and traits (the collective name for advantages and complications) based on the intended power level of the game. This is similar to the siloed point buy and special abilities and character flaws used in a variety of other role-playing games, such as Merits and Flaws in White Wolf Publishing's original World of Darkness, Qualities and Drawbacks in Eden Unisystem, and Edges and Hindrances in Pinnacle Entertainment's Deadlands and Savage Worlds games (to which the Serenity system bears a strong resemblance).

== Published games using the Cortex System ==
- Serenity Role Playing Game (2005)
- Battlestar Galactica Role Playing Game (2007)
- Demon Hunters Role Playing Game (2008)
- Cortex System Role Playing Game
- Supernatural Role Playing Game (2009)

== Reception ==
The initial reception to the Cortex System was good, with the Serenity Role Playing Game winning the 2005 Origins Award for Gamer's Choice: Best Roleplaying Game of the Year. The Battlestar Galactica Role Playing Game gained praise from SF Weekly for the Plot Point mechanisms and the way they reproduced the all-or-nothing moments of the Battlestar Galactica series. The Journal of Transformative Works said that the system itself could be considered transformative given that the rules were meant to evolve through play sessions.

By the time of the Smallville Roleplaying Game (2010), RPGamer commented that "Smallville does something rare in a licensed game: not only does it deliver an experience that captures the feel of the original, but also comes up with a set of mechanics that create an entirely new dynamic for roleplaying."
