= 2012 Origins Award winners =

The following are the winners of the 39th annual (2012) Origins Award, presented at Origins 2013:

| Category | Winner | Company | Designer(s) |
|---|---|---|---|
| Best Roleplaying Game | Marvel Heroic Roleplaying Basic Games | Margaret Weis Productions | Margaret Weis, Cam Banks |
| Best Roleplaying Supplement or Adventure | Marvel Heroic Roleplaying Civil War Essentials Edition Event Book | Margaret Weis Productions | Margaret Weis, Cam Banks |
| Best Board Game | Lords of Waterdeep | Wizards of the Coast | Peter Lee and Rodney Thompson |
| Best Collectible Card Games | Legend of the 5 Rings: Embers of War | AEG | David Seay, John Zinser, and David Williams |
| Best Traditional Card Game | Doctor Who: The Card Game | Cubicle 7/Treefrog Games | Martin Wallace |
| Best Family, Party or Children's Game | Quarriors! Dice Building Game | WizKids | Mike Elliott, Eric M. Lang |
| Best Gaming Accessory | Metal Steampunk Dice Set | Q-Workshop | |
| Best Miniatures Rules | The Hobbit: An Unexpected Journey Campaign Starter Set | WizKids | |
| Best Historical Miniature Figure/Line | Ancient Greeks | Victrix Ltd | |
| Best Historical Board Games | Samurai Battles | Zvezda | Richard Borg and Konstantin Krivenko |
| Best Historical Miniature Rules Supplement | Flames of War: Nuts | Battlefront Miniatures Ltd. | Wayner Turner (mistakenly credited by GAMA as Michael Haught) |
| Best Historical Miniature Rules | Flames of War: Open Fire! | Battlefront Miniatures Ltd. | |
| Best Miniature Figure Line | Marvel HeroClix: Galactic Guardians | WizKids | |
| Best Game-Related Publication | Battletech: Weapons Free | Catalyst Game Labs | |

== Hall of Fame Game Inductees ==
- Munchkin by Steve Jackson Games
- Dominion by Rio Grande Games

== Hall of Fame ==
- Lisa Stevens - Paizo Publishing
- Loren Coleman - Catalyst Game Labs
