= Bloodlust (roleplaying game) =

Tabletop role-playing game

The cover of the 1995 edition, featuring The Death Dealer as cover art, a 1975 painting by Frank Frazetta

Bloodlust is a sword and sorcery fantasy role-playing game first released by French publisher Idéojeux (later known as Asmodée Éditions) in 1991 that allows players to take the role of both a powerful demonic weapon and the hero who wields the weapon.

== Description ==
Bloodlust is a fantasy role-playing game set on the fictional continent of Tanaephis, which in shape resembles the continent of Antarctica. The setting is a medieval fantasy world dominated by warfare and warlike cultures. Although the continent was originally inhabited by various races such as elves and dwarves, thousands of years of warfare have extirpated all races except various cultures of humans: Alwegs, Batranobans, Derigions, Gadhars, Hysnatoons, Piorads, Sekekers, Thunks and Vorozions.

Each player creates a magical intelligent god-infused Weapon that will be wielded by a hero, echoing the demonic sword Stormbringer wielded by Elric of Melniboné in Michael Moorcock's Eternal Champion novels. The Weapon gains power not through combat, but by satisfying its desire for prestige, sex, wealth, violence and reputation. The player also creates the Wielder of the weapon, a typical hero character similar to Robert E. Howard's Conan the Barbarian. The Wielder might be able to initially deny the Weapon's desires, but as the Weapon gains in power, it can more easily overpower the will of the Wielder. Game designer Croc explained, "The saga will be the story of the Weapon. The possibility of changing Wielders will allow the player to play great heroic deeds, great battles ... The only magic is that of Weapons. That is why the Wielders are usually kings or tribal chiefs, people respected for their power."

As critic Pierre Rosenthal pointed out, although the Weapon is virtually indestructible, a player might deliberately sacrifice several Wielders to increase the powers of the Weapon.

Unusually for fantasy role-playing games of the time, there are no gods or religions, nor magic except that which is generated by the Weapons. Hence there are no magicians either; all player characters are Weapons and Wielders.

=== Game system ===
Each character, whether Weapon or Wielder, has six characteristics rated on a scale of 20, and related skills rated up to 100. In order to successfully attempt a skill, the player must roll less than the character's relevant skill on percentile dice. In combat, each character chooses one of six possible actions. During the creation of the Weapon, the player can choose to give it a disadvantage in return for more abilities. Rules are also included for mass combat.

== Publication history ==
Bloodlust was designed by Croc, assisted by G. E. Ranne. The result was a boxed set containing three booklets and a map of Tanaephis, with cover art by Frank Frazetta and interior art by Alberto Varanda. It was published in 1991 by Idéojeux (formerly Siroz Productions and eventually to be renamed Asmodée Éditions).

Idéojeux/Asmodée published ten supplements between 1992 and 1997, as well as a 1995 reprint of the original boxed set gathered into one 176-page softcover book. All except the final supplement, Vengeance! (1997) featured cover art by Frank Frazetta.

A German-language edition, Hyperborea, Meister des Stahls ("Hyperborea, Master of Steel") was published by Mario Truant Verlag in 2001. In 2001, Derek Pearcy started to prepare an English-language version to be published by Hogshead Publishing, but Hogshead abandoned the project.

In 2012, John Doe Editions acquired the rights to Bloodlust and released a completely revised edition titled Bloodlust Édition Métal (Bloodlust Metal Edition), and released a dozen supplements between 2013 and 2022.

== Reception ==
In Issue 67 of the French games magazine Casus Belli, Pierre Rosenthal had issues with the combat rules, pointing out, "With the same die roll to resolve attacks, location, critical hits, we arrive at results which, if they are not aberrant, are a little repetitive, the same attack always doing the same amount of damage in the same place. For my taste, it lacks options for disarmament, unarmed combat, etc." Rosenthal also foresaw problems with the player becoming conflicted by playing both the Wielder and the Weapon, and suggested, "either remove a new Weapon/Wielder pairing after one or two games, or allow to change by one point, positive or negative, the desires of the Weapon with which the player feels in disagreement."

In Issue 21 of the French games magazine Backstab, Julien Blondel explored sex in role-playing games and whether its addition was necessary or simply gratuitous. In the case of Bloodlust, Blendel thought the sexual content was necessary, commenting, "What makes people tick? Power, money and sex. Roleplayers are like everyone else, and even a little bit more: they are looking for sex ... Bloodlust's weapons, which house the minds of criminals, must experience human emotions to progress, and sex is definitely part of that, right?"

The German website Pummelrunde published a retrospective review of the German-language version of Bloodlust and commented that the combat system was more complex than many modern role-playing games: "There are players who enjoy such more detailed combat systems - I don't need anything like that these days. But I have to admit that I was enthusiastic about the system back then as a Dungeon & Dragons player." The review noted with disapproval that other than the first rulebook, none of the French-language supplements had been translated to German. The review concluded "if you like the Sword & Sorcery genre (i.e. Conan, Elric and company), Heavy Metal and maybe aren't averse to the percentile dice system, then it's worth taking a look."
