= Cry-Star: First of the Free =

Supplement for fantasy role-playing game

Cry-Star: First of the Free is a supplement for the super-hero/fantasy role-playing game Providence published by XID Creative in 1989.

== Contents ==
Cry-Star: First of the Free is a supplement in which the capital city of the Alliance of Kings is detailed.

== Publication history ==
In 1997, XID Creative published Providence, a role-playing game mixing the superhero and fantasy genres set on a planet named Providence. Over the next two years, XID published several supplements, including Cry-Star: First of the Free, a 160-page book designed by Dan Budge, with artwork by Budge, Stanley Chou, Raven Mimura, Jeff Toney, Francis Tsai and Cliff van Meter.

== Reception ==
Pyramid noted "The caste conflicts and multi-sided intrigues of Cry-Star are a microcosm of what's going on in the entire game world, and it gives players a solid grounding in what's really going on. It ain't pretty."

In Issue 15 of the French games magazine Backstab, Croc observed, "The material is varied but it all remains very predictable and we would have liked a few additional surprises. Of course, there are some very good ideas (like the King's secret guard, the Ha'jata ninjas, and the Andruu chapter of the D'Shau monks). But overall, the background on the inhabitants only creates additional social castes rather than revealing any additional insights." Croc concluded by giving this book a rating of only 4 out of 10, saying, "In short, we're not bored, but almost. Cry-Star is a supplement that you can easily do without."
