= Attribute (role-playing games) =

Quantified characteristic in role-playing games

An attribute is a piece of data (a "statistic") that describes to what extent a fictional character in a role-playing game possesses a specific natural, in-born characteristic common to all characters in the game. That piece of data is usually an abstract number or, in some cases, a set of dice. Some games use different terms to refer to an attribute, such as statistic, (primary) characteristic or ability. A number of role-playing games like Fate do not use attributes at all.

== The nature of attributes ==
There is no uniform consensus on what ability scores are, even if many role-playing games have them, but games that use them have a common theme. According to the BBC Cult TV website "All characters have Attributes — basic physical and mental abilities." and in the Pathfinder Roleplaying Game "Each character has six ability scores that represent his character's most basic attributes. They are his raw talent and prowess. While a character rarely rolls a check using just an ability score, these scores, and the modifiers they create, affect nearly every aspect of a character's skills and abilities." In some games, such as older versions of Dungeons & Dragons the attribute is used on its own to determine outcomes, whereas in many games, beginning with Bunnies & Burrows and including more modern versions of D&D, the attribute works with a skill to affect the overall outcome.

== Common types of attribute system ==
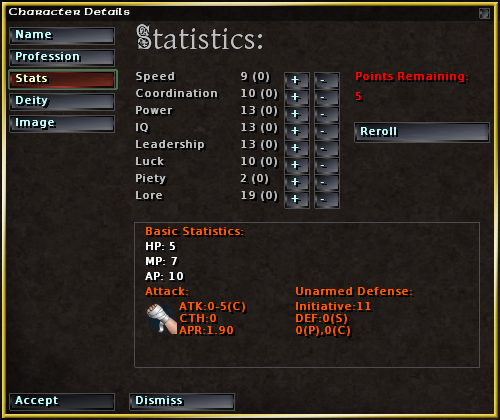
Attributes in S.C.O.U.R.G.E.: Heroes of Lesser Renown.

There is no standard amongst role-playing games as to which attributes are important for the game, though there is a school of design which says you pick the attributes after you decide what the game is about.

=== Set attribute systems ===
==== Dungeons & Dragons ====
Dungeons & Dragons used six attributes (there were brief attempts to add a seventh, Comeliness, in Unearthed Arcana and Dragon magazine, but this was short-lived). The six attributes used in D&D are:

"Physical" statistics

- Strength - measuring intimidation, physical power and carrying capacity
- Constitution - measuring endurance, stamina and healthiness
- Dexterity - measuring agility, balance, coordination and reflexes

"Mental" statistics

- Intelligence - measuring IQ deductive reasoning, critical thinking, cognition, knowledge, memory, logic and rationality
- Wisdom - measuring EQ, intuition, self-awareness, common sense, restraint, perception and insight
- Charisma - measuring force of personality, physical appearance, persuasiveness, personal magnetism, leadership and successful planning

These range from about 3 to 20 (depending on the edition).

The original attribute sequence in D&D was Strength, Intelligence, Wisdom, Constitution, Dexterity, and Charisma in the original 1974 rules. This listed the three "prime requisites" of the character classes before the "general" stats: strength for fighters, intelligence for magic-users, and wisdom for clerics.

The attribute sequence in D&D was changed to Strength, Intelligence, Wisdom, Dexterity, Constitution, and Charisma, sometimes referred to as "SIWDCC". This change was made due to the addition of the thief class, which used dexterity as a prime requisite.

The current "SDCIWC" sequence was introduced in AD&D 2nd edition in an attempt to divide physical and cognitive traits into two groups.

==== Other games ====
Many other notable games have followed suit while slightly varying the attributes, like Traveller (Strength, Dexterity, Endurance, Intelligence, Education, Social Standing) or like Cortex System games such as the Serenity RPG and the Cortex Plus Leverage with Agility, Alertness, Intelligence, Strength, Vitality, and Willpower.

Others use more, some fewer. Tri-Stat dX (including Big Eyes, Small Mouth), as the name would suggest, uses three (Body, Mind, and Soul), whereas a more common division of three, and used in the Cortex Plus game Firefly is Physical, Mental, and Social, but expands with the Storyteller System's attributes.

SPECIAL is an acronym statistics system developed specifically for the Fallout series, representing the seven attributes used to define Fallout characters: Strength, Perception, Endurance, Charisma, Intelligence, Agility and Luck. SPECIAL is heavily based on GURPS, which was originally intended to be the character system used in the game.

Some games have used particularly complex systems. For instance, F.A.T.A.L. uses a system of five attributes with four sub-attributes each, resulting in twenty total statistics to roll. This system was criticised for its complexity and for the lack of correlation between related sub-statistics, resulting in oddities such as a character with a higher Average Speech Rate than Maximum Speech Rate.

=== Classifications ===
The first three editions of Shadowrun had three separate headings of Physical attributes, Mental Attributes, and Special Attributes, with three stats in each. With the six non-special attributes being Strength, Agility, Body, Charisma, Intelligence, and Willpower, and two of the three special attributes relating to magic and the third being derived, this is arguably a six attribute system.

The Storyteller System used in games like Vampire: The Masquerade took this one step further, breaking the attributes down into three by three classifications. Power, Finesse, and Resistance, and Mental, Physical, and Social, leading to nine different combinations each of which has a separate name with, for example, Mental Finesse being the attribute Wits and Social Resistance being Composure.

=== Stats and substats ===
Some games think that attributes are not and should not be treated as entirely independent, and therefore make a lot of their attributes dependent on others.

GURPS uses two levels of statistic: four primary statistics (Strength, Dexterity, Intelligence, Health) and four statistics derived directly from those Fatigue, which defaults to strength or health (depending on edition); Hit Points, which defaults to health or strength (depending on edition); Willpower, which defaults to intelligence; and Speed, which defaults to half the average of health and dexterity.

Hero System 5th edition has eight primary statistics, and a further five derived from them.

=== Fitting the setting ===
Some game systems such as those using the Cortex Plus system or those Powered by the Apocalypse work on the basis that the attributes should emphasise elements of the setting thus making them different from game to game even within the same family. So, for example, Dungeon World is meant to resemble a game of D&D so it uses the same statistics as above, whereas Monsterhearts, with its mix of teen drama and paranormal romance uses the statistics Hot, Cold, Violent, and Dark.

== Common attribute names ==
Attributes are commonly referred to by a three letter abbreviation (Str, Int, etc.).

=== Physical statistics ===
Strength aka Body, Might, Brawn, Power ...
A measure of how physically strong a character is. Strength often controls the power and/or damage of melee attacks, the maximum weight the character can carry, and sometimes hit points. Armor and weapons might also have a Strength requirement to use them.
Constitution aka Stamina, Endurance, Vitality, Recovery ...
A measure of how sturdy a character is. Constitution often influences hit points, resistances for special types of damage (poisons, illness, heat etc.) and fatigue.
Defense aka Resistance, Resilience, ...
A measure of how resilient a character is. Defense usually decreases taken damage by either a percentage or a fixed amount per hit. Occasionally combined with Constitution.
Dexterity aka Agility, Reflexes, Quickness, ...
A measure of how agile a character is. Dexterity controls attack and movement speed and accuracy, as well as evading an opponent's attack (see Armor Class).

=== Mental and other statistics ===
Intelligence aka Intellect, Mind, Knowledge, ...
A measure of a character's problem-solving ability. Intelligence often controls a character's ability to comprehend foreign languages and their skill in magic. In some cases, intelligence controls how many skill points the character gets at "level up". In some games, it controls the rate at which experience points are earned, or the amount needed to level up. Under certain circumstances, this skill can also negate combat actions between players and NPC enemies. This is sometimes combined with wisdom and/or willpower.
Charisma aka Presence, Charm, Social, ...
A measure of a character's social skills, and sometimes their physical appearance. Charisma generally influences prices while trading and NPC reactions. Under certain circumstances, this skill can negate combat actions between players and NPC enemies.
Wisdom aka Spirit, Wits, Psyche, Sense, ...
A measure of a character's common sense and/or spirituality. Wisdom often controls a character's ability to cast certain spells, communicate to mystical entities, or discern other characters' motives or feelings.
Willpower aka Fortitude, Resolve, Sanity, Personality, Ego, ...
A measure of the character's mental resistance (against pain, fear etc.) when falling victim to mind-altering magic, torture, or insanity. Many games combine willpower and wisdom.
Perception aka Alertness, Awareness, Cautiousness, ...
A measure of a character's openness to their surroundings. Perception controls the chance to detect vital clues, traps or hiding enemies, and might influence combat sequence or the accuracy of ranged attacks. Perception-type attributes are more common in more modern games. Note that this skill is usually understood only to apply to what a character can perceive with their established senses (i.e. sight, sound, smell, etc), and does not usually include extrasensory perception or other forms of mental telepathy or telekinesis in the given game unless the character's specific attributes expressly include such abilities (such as the Force in Star Wars). Sometimes combined with wisdom.
Luck aka Fate, Chance, ...
A measure of a character's luck. Luck might influence anything, but mostly random items, encounters and outstanding successes/failures (such as critical hits).
