= Jamie Chambers =

American game designer (born 1975)

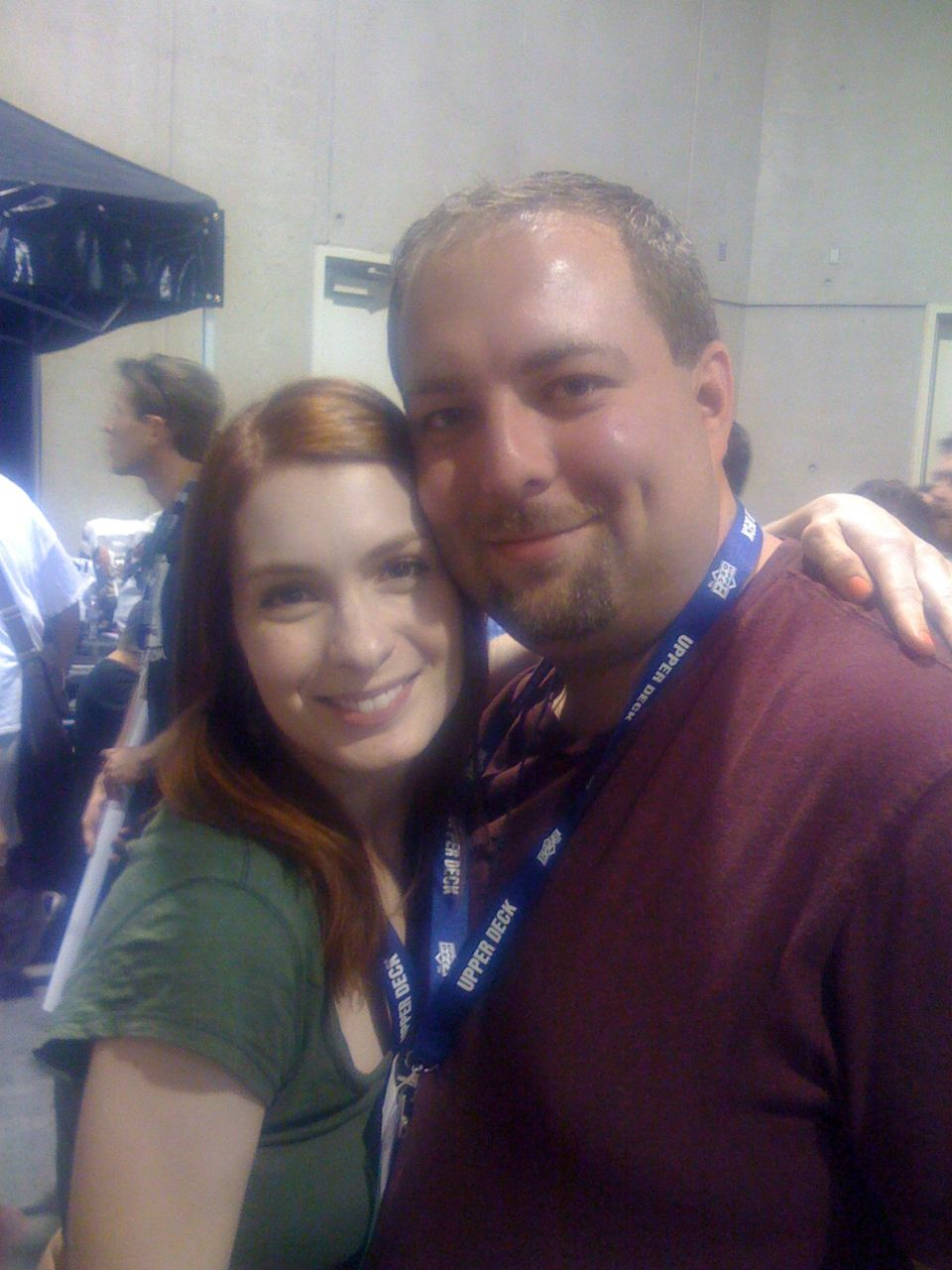
- Felicia Day (Left) and Jamie Chambers (Right)
- Born: James Edwin Vartanian Chambers; January 25, 1975 (age 51); Atlanta, GA
- Occupation: Game designer

Jamie Chambers (born January 25, 1975) is an American game designer who works primarily on role-playing games, contributing in a variety of genres. He served as Vice President of the non-profit Game Manufacturers Association, a trade association for the hobby games industry, from 2007 until 2016, when he chose not to seek re-election. He succeeded Marcus King for the post. Chambers worked with Margaret Weis at Sovereign Press in 1988, then transitioned with her to Margaret Weis Productions (MWP) where he served as Vice President and Lead Designer. While there, he created the Cortex System, a role-playing game ruleset that has been used by MWP since that time.

== Career ==
Jamie Chambers wrote short stories which added to the Sovereign Stone world mythos, and also ran the Sovereign Stone website. Margaret Weis and Don Perrin, with Chambers and Christopher Coyle, authored the Dragonlance Campaign Setting (2003) through the d20 license with by Wizards of the Coast who published the book, with the license also allowing Sovereign Press to continue to expand and supplement that book. Chambers designed Serenity Role Playing Game (2005) using the Cortex System, the first release from Margaret Weis Productions.

Through Margaret Weis Productions, Chambers also created and published the role playing games Battlestar Galactica and Supernatural. At the time, Serenity RPG was the most popular role playing game since the original Dungeons and Dragons, requiring four print runs in the first year of publishing.

== Cortex System ==
Chambers created the Cortex System for the Serenity Role Playing Game during his time at Margaret Weis Productions. He then used it for additional licensed game supplements, several of which were based on television shows and movies, including Battlestar Galactica and Supernatural. The Cortex System shifted away from gameplay determined by the rules toward a gaming experience guided by them, which was considered a necessary step to counterbalance the computerization of role playing games. The system allows the game to evolve throughout a game session, providing the players with ways to create and modify the rules to meet their needs. The system was later adapted into Cortex Plus and Cortex "Prime" by Cam Banks when he took over for Chambers at Margaret Weis Productions as lead designer. Banks later founded Magic Vacuum, a production studio that has licensed the original Cortex System and the revised Cortex Plus, which is considered more narrative than the original Cortex system, building on the move away from systems constrained by rules and allowing further differentiation from computerized role playing games.

== Awards and nominations ==
- 2003 - Lucca Comics Games Awards Best Translated Game for Dragonlance
- 2005 - Origins Award Gamer's Choice Best Role Playing Game of the Year For Serenity
- 2007 - I-CON Shared Worlds Award for his various supplements in the Firefly (TV series) and Serenity (2005 film) universe.
- 2008 - Origins Award Finalist in the Role Playing Games Category for Battlestar Galactica RPG.

== Bibliography ==
Roleplaying Supplements

- Sovereign Stone - Roleplaying books for the Sovereign Stone fiction novel world and the concepts and artwork of artist Larry Elmore.
  - "Sovereign Stone Campaign Sourcebook". RPGnet. 2001. ISBN 9781931567015. Archived from the original on October 26, 2014.
  - "Bestiary of Loerem". RPGnet. 2002. ISBN 9781931567053. Archived from the original on March 14, 2007.
  - "Escape Into Darkness". RPGnet. 2002. ISBN 1931567042. Archived from the original on March 14, 2007.
- Dragonlance - Roleplaying books for the popular Dragonlance fiction novel world and Tabletop role-playing game setting.
  - Dragonlance campaign setting. 2003. ISBN 0786930861. OCLC 53121597. -
  - Peregrine, Andrew; Weis, Margaret; Chambers, Jamie; Weiland, Rob; Coyle, Christopher (2003). Age of Mortals : Dragonlance Campaign Setting Companion. ISBN 1931567107. OCLC 54086997.
  - "Towers of High Sorcery". RPGnet. 2004. ISBN 9781931567176. Archived from the original on March 23, 2007.
  - Hickman, Tracy; Weis, Margaret; Chambers, Jamie (2004). War of the Lance. ISBN 193156714X. OCLC 58734334.
  - Banks, Cam; Chambers, Jamie; MacDonald, Sean; Dragonlance; Valentine, Clark; Whiteman, Trampas (2007). Races of Ansalon. ISBN 9781931567350. OCLC 478623222.
- Serenity/Firefly Universe - Roleplaying books tied into the Firefly (TV series), and associated Serenity (2005 film).
  - Chambers, Jamie; Serenity (2005). Serenity : Role Playing Game. ISBN 1931567506. OCLC 62076884.
  - Blackson, Lynn; Durall, Jason (2010). Serenity six-Shooters & spaceships. ISBN 9781931567817. OCLC 227032180.
- Other Works
  - Chambers, Jamie (2002). Snarfquest RPG World Book. ISBN 9780972246811. Archived from the original on September 6, 2015.
  - "Sundered Reaches Campaign Setting". RPGnet. 2003. ISBN 9781932201314. Archived from the original on May 30, 2008.
  - Battlestar Galactica Quickstart Guide. 2007. ISBN 9781931567541. OCLC 144523355.
  - Chambers, Jamie; Davenport, James; Everette, Sean; Kapera, Patrick; Rockwood, Nathan; Wesel, Floyd C. (2007). Battlestar Galactica Role Playing Game. ISBN 9781931567558. OCLC 148602455. - Tie-in for the Battlestar Galactica (2004 TV series).
  - Cortex System Role Playing Game. 2008. ISBN 9781931567794. OCLC 294887717.
  - Chambers, Jamie (2008). Demon Hunters Role Playing Game. ISBN 9781931567473. OCLC 179792632.
  - Chambers, Jamie; Banks, Cam; McMichael, Jimmy; Rosenberg, Aaron (2009). Supernatural : role playing game. ISBN 9781931567497. OCLC 612083771.
  - Studios, Signal Fire (2016). Metamorphosis Alpha RPG. ISBN 9780989410700.

Short Fiction

- "At The Water's Edge," published in The Search for Power : Dragons of the War of Souls. Weis, Margaret. Renton, WA: Wizards of the Coast. 2004. ISBN 0786931930. OCLC 55085317.
- "Reflections," published in Vampyr Verse (collection). Popcorn Press. 2009. ISBN 9781449582968.
- "The Ultharian," published in Cthulhu Haiku (and Other Mythos Madness). Popcorn Press. 2012. ISBN 9781480136168.
- "Restless," published in Cthulhu Haiku 2 (and More Mythos Madness). Popcorn Press. 2013. ISBN 9781494342401.

Short Nonfiction

- "Growing Up Dragonlance," published in Dragons in the Archives: The Best of Weis & Hickman (anthology). 2004. ISBN 9780786936694. OCLC 56892788.
- "Blue Collar Ghost Hunters," published in In the Hunt : Unauthorized Essays on Supernatural (essay anthology). 2005. ISBN 9781933771632. OCLC 228365200.
- "Getting Out There: Tips For Creating Your Own Vocal Group," published in Filled With Glee: The Unauthorized Glee Companion. 2011. ISBN 9781935618003. OCLC 505420552.
