= Initiative (role-playing games) =

In most tabletop role-playing games (RPGs), an initiative system determines in which order player characters and non-player characters take their actions, to avoid confusion on when a character gets to act. These derive from RPGs roots in tabletop wargaming, where similar systems are used. Rules for initiative vary from game to game, but often follow one of a few common methods:

- Statistic-based: The most common method, used by games like Dungeons & Dragons and Fate is for each character to be assigned an initiative number based on a relevant attribute plus a random factor, and for people to act in that order. Some games determine initiative order once, some once per round.
- Taking turns in groups: In some games, each faction takes its turn to act, and it is entirely up to the side acting who acts in which order for that side.
- Shot clock: Feng Shui and Arcanis both use a shot clock. Each round is divided into segments or shots, and each action takes a certain number of these segments. Actions happen whenever the character's next free segment turns up.
- Choice: In Marvel Heroic Roleplaying each character to act may choose anyone who has not acted already in that round as the next character to act. The final person to act in the round chooses who acts first in the next round.

== See also ==
- Turn-based game
