= F.A.T.A.L. =

Fantasy tabletop role-playing game

- Second edition cover
- Other names: Fantasy Adventure to Adult Lechery (1st ed); From Another Time Another Land (2nd ed)
- Publishers: Fatal Games
- Publication: October 25, 2000 (alpha); 2002 (1st ed); 2004 (2nd ed)
- Genres: Dark fantasy, grimdark, low fantasy

F.A.T.A.L., an acronym of Fantasy Adventure to Adult Lechery (first edition) or From Another Time Another Land (second edition), is a dark fantasy tabletop role-playing game first published in 2002 (Note: The publication date of Fantasy Adventure to Adult Lechery is debated. The alpha version of the game was available from 2000, but the canonical first edition was released in 2002. From Another Time Another Land was released in 2004.) by Fatal Games.

F.A.T.A.L. is known for its graphic violent and sexual content, as well as the complexity of the underlying game system, involving higher-level mathematics and an unusual amount of randomization in character development. It acquired a strongly negative reputation in the tabletop roleplaying community, being universally panned and described as one of the most controversial games ever released. It is particularly known as the subject of a 2003 review published on RPGnet by Darren MacLennan and Jason Sartin, which described it as "the Necronomicon of role-playing games", "fundamentally broken in its attitude towards sexuality", and characterized by "bitter misogyny".

== System ==
F.A.T.A.L. has a simulationist system with an unusual level of complexity, especially regarding sexual violence and bodily characteristics. Character creation involves twenty separate attributes, none of which correlate with one another even when they might be intuitively assumed to be related. For instance, in the first edition, Average Speech Rate and Maximum Speech Rate are unrelated, meaning the former can be higher than the latter. (Note: This was corrected in the game's second edition.) Attributes are determined by rolling 4d100/2-1 in the first edition, or 10d100/5-1 in the second edition. (Note: Roleplaying game dice notation is formatted as "d[number]", such that an ordinary six-sided die is called a "d6". A "d100" would theoretically be a 100-sided die, though more often is two ten-sided dice, with one treated as the tens unit and the other as the ones unit. By extension, F.A.T.A.L. requests a player roll eight (in the first edition) or twenty (in the second edition) dice, plus a mathematical formula, for each individual character attribute.) The majority of character traits are determined by random rolls at creation, including ones usually decided by players, such as eye colour, hairstyle, and sexual orientation. More prurient traits are also determined by rolling, such as breast size, genital size, and, notoriously, potential anal circumference.

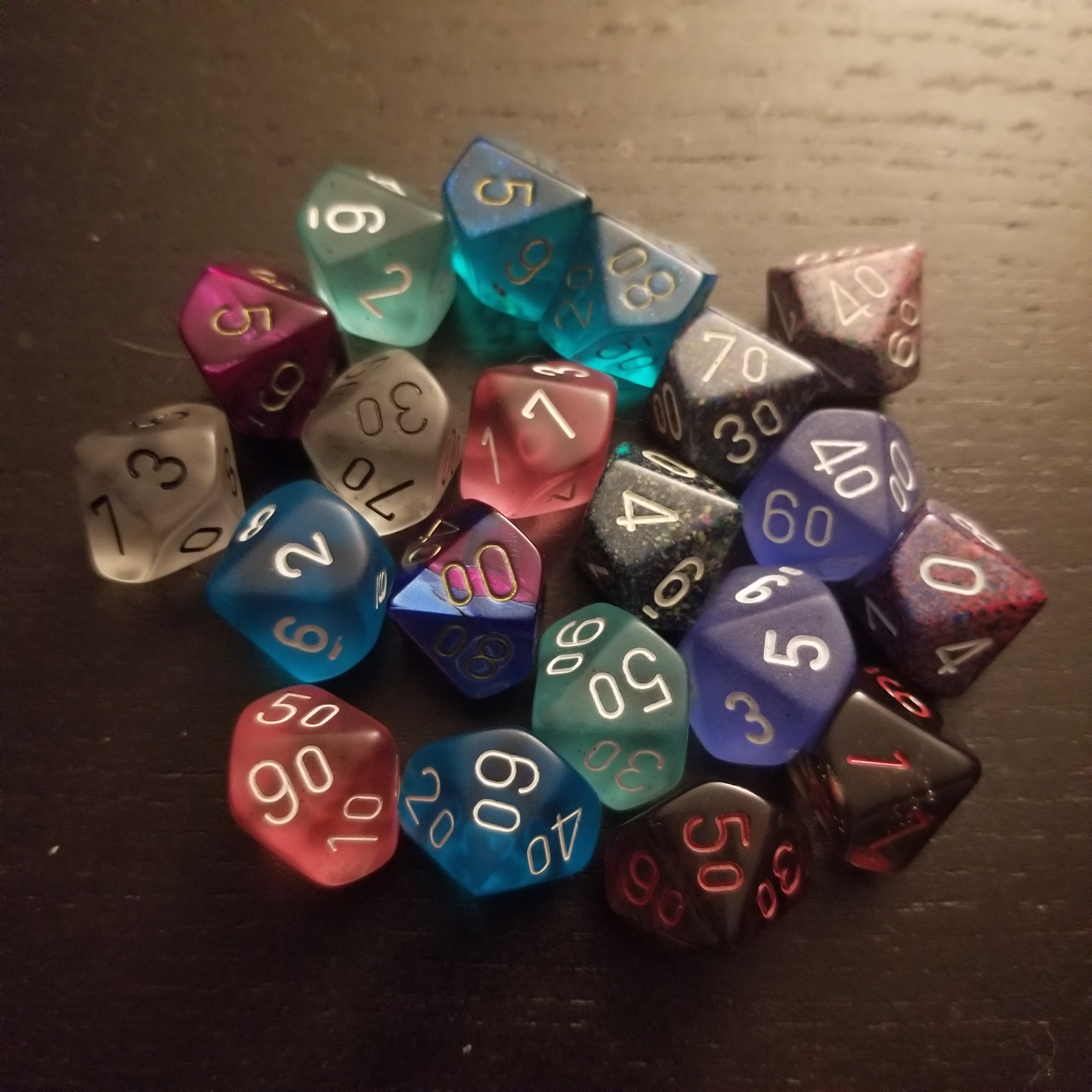
Twenty ten-sided dice, the amount needed to roll a single attribute

Sex and sexuality is a heavy focus of the F.A.T.A.L. system, often in idiosyncratic ways. While extensive rules and mechanics for rape are established, consensual sex is not mentioned at any point in the game. The rules for rape are also incorporated into the section on combat more generally, a design decision that drew criticism for an apparent normalization of sexual violence. Extreme sexual content is frequently used for shock value, such as magical items which induce forced masturbation or bestiality. James Hausler, one of the co-creators of the game, later defended the rape content as a design decision by main writer Byron Hall; specifically, the list of mental illnesses characters could roll included multiple paraphilias related to rape and sexual violence, and Hall demanded mechanics be built to accommodate them. In the MacLennan/Sartin review, MacLennan referred to F.A.T.A.L. as "the date rape RPG". Hall, in his response, asked "Where is dating included?"

F.A.T.A.L. has a broad variety of character skills and classes, including ones considered irrelevant by the majority of role-playing games. The "Urination" skill, for example, defines the amount of urine a character can produce, and at what speed. Character classes such as "Delouser", "Grocer", and "Claspmaker" were criticised for their irrelevance to a fantasy adventure game. The mechanics for other classes followed the game's overall pattern of high randomization. For instance, none of the spellcasting classes are guaranteed to gain new spells upon an increase in character level, but rather have to roll for how many spells—if any—they gain, and at what spell level. The available spells are also often eclectic, obscene, or peripheral in use, such as "Against Every Wild Animal, Aquatic Creature, and Robbers", "Force Fart", and "Bestow Ulcer". The spell "Have Her Cadaver"—which makes a deceased woman appear alive but unconscious, and which is described by the rulebook as primarily used for necrophilic sexual intercourse—received a particularly strong negative reception, becoming one of the game's most infamous features.

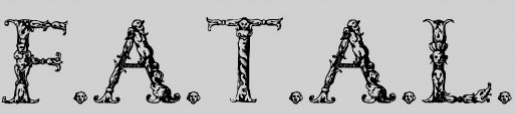
The logo for the first edition

F.A.T.A.L. describes itself as "the most difficult, detailed, realistic, and historically/mythically accurate role-playing game available". The game master, referred to as the "MaimMaster" in the first edition and the "Aedile" in the second edition, is encouraged to be adversarial rather than collaborative, while the system is built around difficult combat and the assumption of frequent character death. According to Hausler, the objective is to "survive as long as possible". While F.A.T.A.L. describes itself as a paragon of historical accuracy and realism, the game has been criticised for lacking verisimilitude in both backstory and mechanics. For instance, the game world lacks significant influence from any actual historical period, while the combat system—heavily focused on damage to specific individual organs—produces unrealistic results like injuring an internal organ without harming the flesh around it. Other individual mechanics which have drawn attention include the process of determining how many children a pregnant woman gives birth to, which theoretically involves rolling a ten-million-sided die, and the social class system, which refers to serfs as a free middle class above the peasantry (in reality, serfs had a status barely above slaves).

== Reception ==
(S)aying that this game should be burned is an insult to fire.

— Jason Sartin

F.A.T.A.L.'s reception has been overwhelmingly negative. Its most famous review is that by MacLennan and Sartin; some other reviewers have refused to cover it, due both to its content, and to the degree to which the MacLennan/Sartin review overshadows other attempts. Though the sexual violence and misogyny makes up the majority of the criticism, the game has also been criticised for racism and homophobia; for instance, physically unattractive characters are more likely to be gay or lesbian, and the first edition of the game featured magical armour that transformed its wearers into ethnic stereotypes. Due to F.A.T.A.L.'s notoriety amongst the tabletop role-playing game community, many individual aspects of the game have been examined when they may otherwise have fallen into obscurity. For example, the theme song, described by MacLennan as "sound[ing] like the Cookie Monster chasing a drum kit being pushed down a flight of stairs", has been preserved even after the original web host went down. Hausler later stated the theme song was by Ryan Keane, one of the game's co-creators, and that it was unrepresentative of his ability as an otherwise talented death metal guitarist.

F.A.T.A.L. theme song
The theme song, composed by Ryan Keane and Byron Hall

F.A.T.A.L. also received particular attention for its misogynistic content. The rulebooks for both editions refer to female characters by a number of explicit and insulting slurs, such as "cuntress", "slut", and "slovenly whore". Female genitalia is referred to throughout the books by a number of neologistic insults, primarily "cunt-pipe". Female characters are unable to enter many character classes, particularly those related to combat or spellcasting; they also receive significant penalties to most physical and intellectual attributes. The game's attitude to gender has been described as "designed by misogynistic human accidents" and as "heinous [and] despicable".

After the MacLennan/Sartin review, Hall and co-creator John Terry (known pseudonymously as 'Burnout') wrote their own response to the review. The creators of F.A.T.A.L. considered the game to be "highbrow", and were frustrated by the negative and mocking reception it received. They were also upset by the degree to which negative reviews on the game focused on emotional and shocking content, when Hall believed in "remain[ing] calm and unemotional" in disputes. They also disagreed that the game was focused on rape and misogyny. However, Hall and Terry did agree with some of the criticisms, such as "brassiere" having been misspelled as "brazier" and that the ethnic stereotype armour should be removed; these were changed in the second edition.

The poor reception and quality of F.A.T.A.L. has become a benchmark for other negatively reviewed role-playing games. For instance, while MacLennan originally savaged the game The World of Synnibarr, he later said "you have to like Synnibarr after you've read F.A.T.A.L.". The impact of F.A.T.A.L. on the broader genre of sexually explicit role-playing games has also been considered; as a high-profile sexually explicit game that received such a negative reception, it has been accused of casting a shadow over the broader genre and particularly on games that use sexual content to shock and provoke.

== Legacy ==
F.A.T.A.L. has an enduring legacy as one of the most poorly received and controversial role-playing games ever released. Ed Grabinowski of Gizmodo said in 2013 that "[t]here is really only one thing F.A.T.A.L. accomplished in its short history, and that is to become the closest thing to a true Lovecraftian presence in the gaming industry". F.A.T.A.L.'s transgression of genre norms has been conceptualized as both a design choice and a sign of incompetence on the part of its creators.

Shortly after the release of the second edition, Hall, the game's primary creator, withdrew from the tabletop gaming world. The creators went quiet until 2014, when co-creator James Hausler agreed to an audio interview with a reviewer. Hausler took credit for a number of the game's most infamous aspects, such as the anal circumference tables, the elaborate called-shots combat system, and the majority of the player races—such as the Kinder-Fresser ogre, a species of ogre that typically eats virginal human children. He also said F.A.T.A.L. was intended to be "highbrow" and incorporate "complex philosophical themes", and to "revolutionise gaming". Hausler claimed F.A.T.A.L. was "ahead of the curve" at the time of its creation, and that it had the potential to be a massive commercial success. Fatal Games had originally planned to acquire nationwide distribution for the game, which would be followed by a "child-friendly" version and a number of modules and expansions. However, the game's copyright was registered solely with Hall; after his disappearance from the gaming scene, Hausler stated that Hall had not returned his calls regarding republication or selling the rights, preventing the game from seeing further release.

== See also ==
- List of video games notable for negative reception
