= Philippe Tromeur =

French game designer

- Occupation: Game designer

Philippe Tromeur is a French game designer.

== Career ==
Philippe Tromeur is the creator of Wuthering Heights, a parodic role-playing game. The game was distributed free on the internet by French author Philippe Tromeur.

Tromeur also worked on the French versions of Nobilis and In Nomine Satanis / Magna Veritas.
