= Cam Banks =

Role-playing game designer

- Born: Auckland, New Zealand
- Occupation: Writer, game designer
- Genre: Role-playing games

Cam Banks is a game designer known his work on the Cortex System line of roleplaying games, and as the lead designer for Marvel Heroic Roleplaying, and for founding Fandom Tabletop.

== Career ==
Cam Banks and Christopher Coyle wrote a new campaign saga for Dragonlance that was produced by Sovereign Press in three parts: Key of Destiny (2004), Spectre of Sorrows (2005) and Price of Courage (2006). The series totaled 730 pages and covered the major events that occurred in the Age of Mortals. His first novel was published in 2007. He wrote the 2008 Dragonlance novel The Sellsword. Banks was later the Cortex System line editor for Margaret Weis Productions, and in 2010 the system was renovated into the Cortex Plus system. Banks was the line developer for the Smallville Roleplaying Game (2010), which he co-designed with indie game publisher Josh Roby. Banks co-designed Leverage: The Roleplaying Game (2011) with Rob Donoghue, Clark Valentine, and others.

Banks was a line developer at Margaret Weis Productions, where he led the development of the Smallville Roleplaying Game, Leverage: The Roleplaying Game, and Marvel Heroic Roleplaying in addition to continuing with Margaret Weis' historical properties, leading the development of the Big Damn Heroes supplement for the Serenity Role Playing Game, and working on the Dragonlance setting.

=== Licensing of Cortex RPG Rules System ===
On November 1, 2016, Margaret Weis Productions released a statement announcing that Cam Banks and his new design studio Magic Vacuum had licensed the original Cortex System and Cortex Plus system and would be "taking over the design, development, and publishing of games based on these rules... for 2017 and beyond," coinciding with "Margaret’s retirement from RPG development to focus on her current novel and film projects."

In September 2019, Fandom Tabletop acquired the rights to Cortex from MWP and hired Banks as their new Cortex Creative Director.

== Critical reception ==
As a lead designer on pre-existing products, Cam Banks was responsible for Margaret Weis Productions second ever Origins Award with Big Damn Heroes. His Supernatural: Guide to the Hunted was applauded for the design and detail work although criticized slightly for the adherence to Supernatural's canon. After becoming line developer he ceased to use the Cortex System, instead working with members of Evil Hat Productions to produce all the new games he created using the Cortex Plus.

Reception for the Cortex Plus games has been generally positive. Both io9 and RPGamer reviewed the Smallville Roleplaying Game, Banks's first game as lead designer. They praised the way the game "had the heart of an independent role playing game and focused on conflict rather than powers." Leverage: The Roleplaying Game was nominated for an Origins Award, and Marvel Heroic Roleplaying won two Origins Awards and an ENnie and was praised by SF Signal for how "authentic and true to the characters the representations felt."

== Personal life ==
A native of New Zealand, Banks lives in St Paul, Minnesota, where he has been working as a brand manager and production specialist for Atlas Games since February 2013.

== Bibliography ==
=== Roleplaying Games and Supplements ===
Cam Banks has been a freelance writer and designer for Sovereign Press, and a designer and line developer for Margaret Weis Productions where he first produced supplements for the Cortex System games designed by Jamie Chambers. Then he led the design of the Cortex Plus games. He is the current Cortex Creative Director with Fandom Tabletop.

==== Dragonlance ====
- Design Credits: Dragonlance Dungeon Master's Screen (2003)
- Additional Design Credits: Age of Mortals (2003)
- Additional Design Credits: Towers of High Sorcery (2004)
- Additional Design Credits: War of the Lance (2004)
- Design Credits: Bestiary of Krynn 2004 ENnie Awards: Best Art, Interior and Best Monster Supplement: Silver Awards
- Author: Dragons of Krynn (2006)
- Author: Bestiary of Krynn (revised) (2007)
- Co-author: Key of Destiny (2004)
- Co-author: Spectre of Sorrows (2005)
- Co-author: Price of Courage (2006)
- Dragonlance: Dragons of Autumn (Updated version of the original adventures)
- Dragonlance: Dragons of Winter (Updated version of the original adventures)

==== Cortex System Games and Supplements with Margaret Weis Productions ====
- Lead Designer: Serenity Role Playing Game supplement: The Big Damn Heroes Handbook (2009) – Origins Award: Best Roleplaying Supplement
- Lead Designer: Supernatural Role Playing Game supplement: Supernatural: Guide To The Hunted (2010)

==== Cortex Plus games with Margaret Weis Productions ====
- Lead Designer: Smallville Roleplaying Game (2009)
- Lead Designer: Leverage: The Roleplaying Game (2010)
- Lead Designer: Marvel Heroic Roleplaying Basic Game (2011) Origins Award: Best Roleplaying Game 2012 ENnies: Best Roleplaying Game Silver Award
- Lead Designer: Marvel Heroic Roleplaying Civil War Event Book Essentials Edition (2011) Origins Award: Best Roleplaying Supplement 2012 ENnies: Best Roleplaying Game Supplement
- Lead Designer: Marvel Heroic Roleplaying Civil War Event Book Premium Edition (2011) (the same as the Essentials Edition, but containing the game rules from the Basic Set).

==== Demon Hunters: A Comedy of Terrors RPG ====
- Game Designer and Writer: Demon Hunters: A Comedy of Terrors RPG (2014)

==== Cortex Prime Games and Supplements with Fandom Tabletop ====
- Author, Creative Director, and Lead Designer: Cortex Prime Game Handbook (2020)
- Author, Creative Director, and Lead Designer: Tales of Xadia: The Dragon Prince Roleplaying Game (2021)
- Author, Creative Director, and Lead Designer: Legends of Grayskull: The Masters of the Universe Roleplaying Game (2021)

=== Books ===
- The Sellsword
