= Plot point (role-playing games) =

In tabletop role-playing games, a plot point is a resource possessed by a player which can be spent to alter the plot of the game. The name is a pun on the TV and film term plot point.

== Description ==
In most commercial RPGs, plot points represent the heroic quality of player characters, which separates them from other people in the game world, and as such are spent to increase a character's chance of success in combat or other actions. Examples include Fate points in FATE (also RPGs based on the FATE system), Edge in MechWarrior, Fortune dice in Feng Shui or Force points in the Star Wars role-playing games from West End Games (Star Wars: The Roleplaying Game) and Wizards of the Coast (the Star Wars Roleplaying Game).

In some RPGs, mostly indie RPGs, plot points are rather a way of involving the player in the story. They can be spent to introduce something into the game, or to add a previously unrevealed fact about a character. Examples include story tokens in Capes, the seven types of Narrative privileges (Privilèges narratifs) in the 2nd edition of The Last Chronicles of Erdor (Les Chroniques d'Erdor, in French) or backgrounds in Dogs in the Vineyard.

In Steve Jackson Games's role-playing game Toon, plot points are used as experience points, awarded for completing in-game objectives and used to increase a player character's statistics.

The first role-playing game to incorporate plot points was Top Secret by TSR, Inc. which gave each character between 1-10 luck points. Each luck point allowed a player to reverse the consequences of a single roll.

Character creation in the Serenity Role Playing Game (2005) is point-based; in addition to that, players are able to spend plot points to change the outcome of die rolls, which become a standard feature in licensed games based on dramatic series. In the Cortex System, players receive plot points as a reward for role-playing the disadvantages of their characters, and this interrelation between plot points and complications was a trend that was more in line with indie game design than the more traditional role-playing system of Cortex. In the Smallville Roleplaying Game, plot points are a central resource which player characters gain by using complications and can be used to access superhuman powers. Leverage: The Roleplaying Game also featured a plot-point economy, using the distinctions of the characters.
