= D notation =

D notation or D-notation may refer to:

- D notation (computing), scientific notation for double precision numbers in some versions of FORTRAN and BASIC
- Dice notation, dice algebra in gaming
- D-notation (sometimes called Euler notation), one way of writing derivatives in differential calculus
