= Statistic (role-playing games) =

Piece of data representing a particular aspect of a fictional character

A statistic (or stat) in role-playing games is a piece of data that represents a particular aspect of a fictional character. That piece of data is usually a (unitless) integer or, in some cases, a set of dice.

For some types of statistics, this value may be accompanied with a descriptive adjective, sometimes called a specialisation or aspect, that either describes how the character developed that particular score or an affinity for a particular use of that statistic (like Specialisations in Ars Magica or Attribute Aspects in Aria).

Most games divide their statistics into several categories. The set of categories actually used in a game system, as well as the precise statistics within each category, vary greatly. The most often used types of statistic include:

- Attributes describe to what extent a character possesses natural, in-born characteristics common to all characters.
- Advantages and disadvantages are useful or problematic characteristics that are not common to all characters.
- Powers represent unique or special qualities of the character. In game terms, these often grant the character the potential to gain or develop certain advantages or to learn and use certain skills.
- Skills represent a character's learned abilities in predefined areas.
- Traits are broad areas of expertise, similar to skills, but with a broader and usually more loosely defined scope, in areas freely chosen by the player.

There is no standard nomenclature for statistics; for example, both GURPS and the Storytelling System refer to their statistics as "traits", even though they are treated as attributes and skills.

Many games make use of derived statistics whose values depend on other statistics, which are known as primary or basic statistics. Game-specific concepts such as experience levels, alignment, character class and race can also be considered statistics.

== Types ==
=== Attributes ===
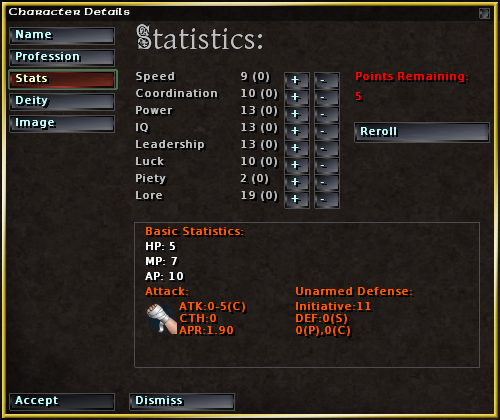
Attribute advancement screen in a computer role-playing game

An attribute describes to what extent a character possesses a natural, in-born characteristic common to all characters in the game. Attributes are also called statistics, characteristics or abilities.

Most role-playing games use attributes to describe the physical and mental characteristics of characters, for example their strength or wisdom. Many games also include social characteristics as well, for example a character's natural charisma or physical appearance. They often influence the chance to succeed in a skill or other tests by addition to a die roll or by determining the number of dice to be thrown. As a consequence, usually a higher number is better, and ranges can be as small as 1–5 (for numbers of dice) or as great as 1–100 (when adding to results of percentile dice). In some games, attributes represent linearly increasing ability (e.g. in Tunnels and Trolls, where a character can lift 10 lbs per point of Strength) whereas in others a small increase can represent a major gain in ability (e.g. in the DC Heroes/Blood of Heroes system, where +1 to Strength doubles a character's lifting capacity).

Some games work with only a few broad attributes (such as Physical or Mental), while others have a greater number of more specific ones. Most games have about 4–10 attributes.

Most games try to give all attributes about the same usefulness to a character. Therefore, certain characteristics might be merged (such as merging a Charisma-type and a Willpower-type attribute into a single Personality attribute), or split into more attributes (such as splitting physical "Comeliness" from Charisma in the original Unearthed Arcana), or even ignored altogether (for example, Intelligence and Charisma in a hack and slash adventure). In many games, a small set of primary attributes control a larger number of derived statistics such as Armor Class or magic points.

During character creation, attribute scores are usually determined either randomly (by rolling dice) or by distributing character points. In some games, such as World of Warcraft, the base attribute scores are determined by the character's race and class (however the vast majority of stat points will be obtained through end-game gear/equipment). Because they represent common, in-born characteristics and not learned capabilities (as skills do), in many games they are fixed for the duration of the game. However, in some games they can be increased by spending experience points gained during the game, or as part of the process of "levelling up".

=== Advantages and disadvantages ===
An advantage is a physical, social, intellectual, or other enhancement to a character. In contrast, a disadvantage is an adverse effect. Advantages are also known as virtues, merits or edges and disadvantages as flaws or hindrances, or by the abbreviation "disads".

Many games encourage or even force players to take disadvantages for their characters in order to balance their advantages or other "positive" statistics. Disadvantages also add flavor to a character that can't be obtained solely by a list of positive traits. Advantages and disadvantages often have a thematic element to them. They often provide a direct relationship between how someone wants to role-play their character and a tangible "in-game" enhancement to skill or ability rolls.

Systems of advantages and disadvantages are often criticized for allowing or even encouraging min-maxing, where a player strives to take disadvantages which have little or no tangible effect on play while using the character points gained from those disadvantages to pay for powerful advantages.

=== Character points ===
Character points are abstract units used in some role-playing games during character creation and development.

Early role-playing games such as Dungeons & Dragons assigned random values to a player character's attributes, while allowing each character a fixed number of skills. As a result, characters were at the same time wildly unbalanced in terms of attributes and heavily constrained in terms of skills. Champions (1981) introduced a points-based system of purchasing attributes and skills as a means of improving game balance and flexibility. These points are known as character points, and it has become a feature of numerous later games, most notably GURPS.

Usually, a player is allotted a number of points for character creation. A character's attributes (such as high intelligence), skills (such as fixing a car or mechanics), or powers (such as flying) can then be bought for a certain number of points. More powerful abilities or a greater degree of power will require more "spending" of character points. Later, character points can be earned and spent to improve attributes or skills, or to buy new skills or powers. In some games, such as Champions, these points are experience points; in others, such as Ars Magica, there is a more complicated relationship between experience points and character points.

=== Powers ===
A power represents a unique or special quality that a character can use.

In many games, powers are binary on-or-off qualities as opposed to attributes and skills which are usually numeric quantities. The main exception to this is superhero RPGs, where superpowers are often treated as a sort of skill. Superpowers may also use the same rating scale as the primary statistics.

=== Skills ===
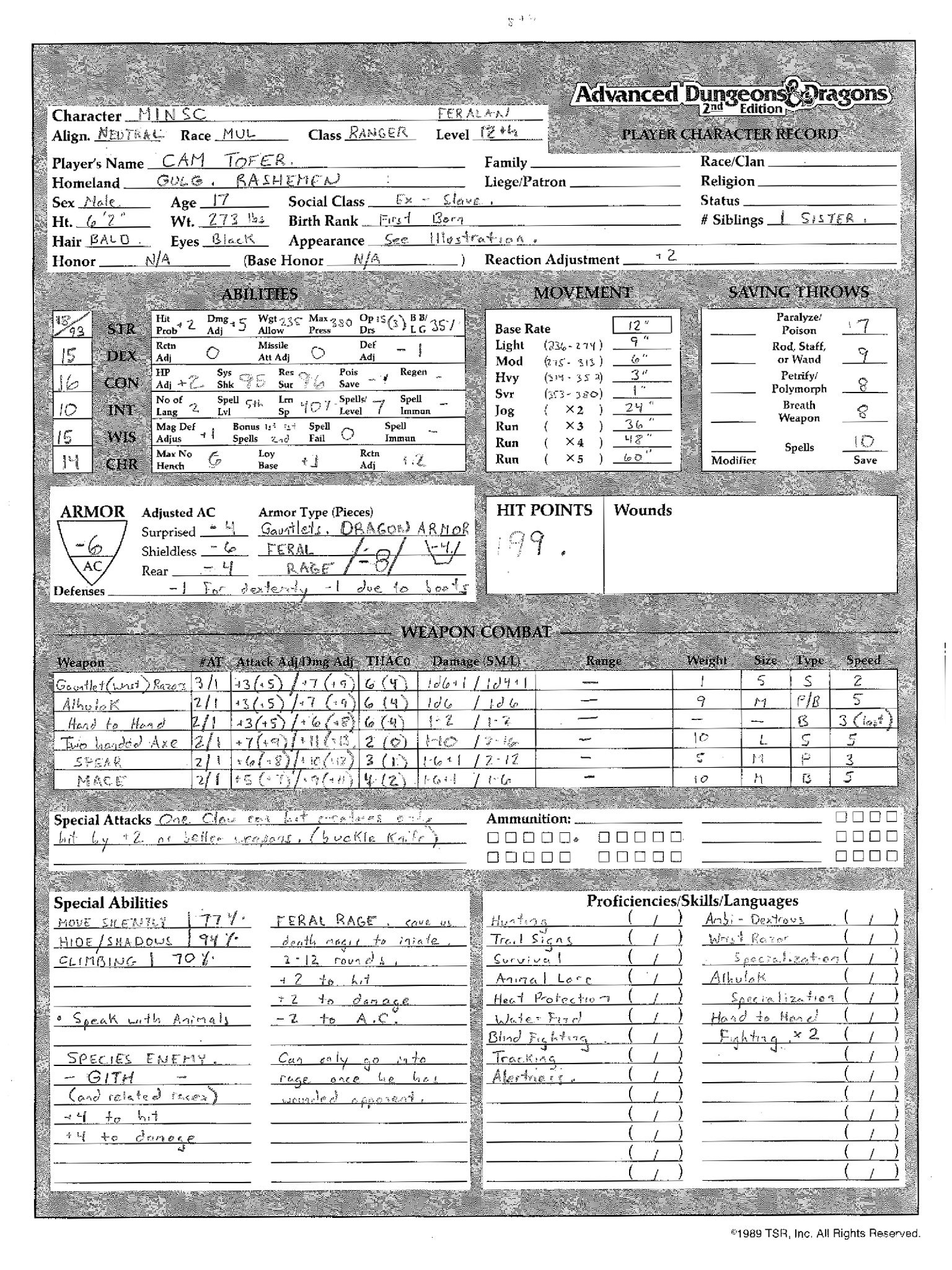
A Dungeons & Dragons character sheet listing skills such as "move silently" and "speak with animals"

A skill represents the learned knowledge and abilities of a character. Skills are known by various names, including proficiencies, abilities, powers, talents and knacks.

During character creation, a player character's skills are generally chosen from a long list. A character may have a fixed number of starting skills, or they may be paid for using character points. In contrast to attributes, very few games fix a player's skills at the start of the game, instead allowing players to increase them by spending experience points or during "levelling up". Since some skills are likely to be more useful than others, different skills often have different costs.

Skills usually influence a character's chance to succeed by adding to the relevant attribute. In some games (such as GURPS), each skill has a specific base attribute to which it is always added; in others (such as Ars Magica), a skill can be added to different attributes depending on how the skill is being used. Some games (such as Feng Shui) add the base attribute to the skill at character creation time; after that, it is independent of the attribute and is used instead of the attribute rather than adding to it. Most games have a fixed penalty for attempting a task without a relevant skill; older editions of Shadowrun gave a complex network of penalties for using similar skills (such as attempting to pick an electronic lock by using the Computer skill instead of the Electronics skill). The text-based roleplaying game Avalon: The Legend Lives is noted for being the first text based multi user role-playing game to offer a developed profession and skills system. Choosing a profession then conveyed a bank of general skills and guild specific ones each containing a ladder of skills which could be invested in via lessons earned through on-line play. Initially there were around 30 such skills with approximately 17 abilities in each covering a wide range from Riding, Perception, Thievery or Demonology. As of 2015 Avalon possesses 66 Skills with 2194 distinct abilities developed over its 26-year tenure.

=== Traits ===
A trait represents a broad area of expertise of a character.

Traits are rarely drawn from a predetermined list; rather, the player chooses some description during character generation. For example, a squash-playing history professor with a knowledge of fine wines might have the traits "History", "Squash" and "Oenology". In terms of a more fine-grained system of statistics, a single trait would often be represented by a group of skills, one or more advantages and attributes, or a combination thereof.

The first major role-playing game to use traits was Over the Edge. Some systems, such as Castle Falkenstein and HeroQuest, use traits as the only type of statistic, although they may use some other term for them, such as abilities.

=== Derived statistics ===
Many games make use of derived statistics: statistics whose values are determined only by the values of other, "basic" statistics. They often represent a single capability of the character such as the weight a character can lift, or the speed at which they can move. Some are unitless numbers, but often they use real-world units of measurement (such as kilograms or metres per second). Derived statistics are often used during combat (e.g. hit points, Armor Class and initiative). Basic and derived statistics are also called primary and secondary statistics, respectively.

In games which use such concepts, derived statistics are often modified by the character's race and class. In addition, certain in-game methods such as spells or magical items might raise or lower these statistics temporarily.

== Interdependencies between statistics ==
Some games define various interdependencies between statistics of different categories, as well as within categories. The most common are:

Prerequisite
Only if statistic A has a value of at least x, statistic B may exceed value y. (Where y is often 0 or none.) For example, a character class may require certain minimum attribute scores, or a spell may require a minimal level of magical talent. Learning some esoteric skill often requires knowledge of another one at an "expert" level or possession of a certain advantage: In GURPS Martial Arts, for example, "cinematic" or "mystical" martial arts abilities require a special advantage, Trained by a Master.

Limitation
If statistic A has a value of at least x, then statistic B cannot exceed value y. This is the opposite of prerequisite. (Only if statistic A has a value of at most x, statistic B may exceed value y.) For example, a character class may be disallowed for certain races, or one of the game effects of a disadvantage (say, Unfit), could be to limit a certain attribute (Constitution or Health in the example) to a certain maximum value (no more than average).

Bonus or base value
If statistic A has a value of x, then the value of statistic B is increased by (or starts at) y. The term base value is preferred if y = x or if y is large compared to Bs value. Higher scores in an attribute often grant bonuses to a group of skills.

Derivation
If statistics A and B have values of x and y, respectively, then the value of statistic C is a function of (x, y).
