= Capes (role-playing game) =

Tabletop role-playing game

- Designers: Tony Lower-Basch
- Publishers: Muse of Fire Games
- Publication: 2005
- Genres: Indie, Superhero
- Systems: Custom

Capes is a role-playing game by Tony Lower-Basch, independently published by Muse of Fire Games.

== Gameplay ==
Capes is one of the role-playing game systems published in the early 2000s to not require a gamemaster. Capes was designed with the question in mind of whether 'Power is fun-but do you deserve it?'; its game mechanics were designed for players to explore that theme during play. Capes is a superhero storytelling game where all players play all of the characters in common to tell a comic book story rather than play the adventures of one character per player.

It is a superhero role-playing game played in "scenes", in which players choose what character to play before each new scene. The game is a competitive storytelling game without a GM. Players create and play the villains who oppose other players' heroes.

Characters are generally co-owned, but controlled by one player at a time. Losers in conflicts can earn "story tokens" that can be used to influence the game, so it's sometimes beneficial to play a supervillain that gets beaten to get more story tokens.

The game also has a "gloating rule" that emulates situations where (for example) the villain can easily kill the heroes.

The only known module for the system is "Invasion from Earth Prime"

== Reception ==
Jeremy Reaban for RPGnet reviewed the game and stated that "Capes is a very unusual new role-playing game from Muse of Fire Studio, available through the good folks at Indie Press Revolution. At first glance, it's a super-hero game, but in reality, it's almost a completely different sort of role-playing game. Role-playing games generally separate the game part from the role-playing. Capes actually makes a game out of the role-playing itself."

The reviewer from the online second volume of Pyramid said that "In this era of thick and heavy superhero rulebooks, a slim little volume like Capes seems downright casual and cute. Don't be fooled. Capes offers a challenge unlike any in the comic book gaming niche, one which some players will take up with glee."

The reviewer from superherorpgs.com said that "For players who value role-playing over 'roll-playing,' Capes offers a fresh alternative to the glut of superhero games already on the market. Longtime players accustomed to stringent rules and tables may have some initial difficulty adjusting to the open-ended gameplay, but first-time gamers should adapt quickly. While most superhero role-playing sessions are considered disappointing if the good guys lose, Capes allows you to win regardless of who comes out on top."

Capes was nominated for Best Game and Best Rules at the 2005 ENnie Awards.
