= Supernatural Role Playing Game =

2009 role-playing game

- Cover of core book
- Designers: Jamie Chambers
- Publishers: Margaret Weis Productions, Ltd
- Publication: 2009
- Genres: Supernatural; Horror
- Systems: Cortex Classic System

The Supernatural Role Playing Game is a tabletop role-playing game by Margaret Weis Productions that was released in 2009. It is based on the American television series Supernatural and was the final game to use the Cortex Classic System of role-playing games.

== Gameplay ==
Like most role-playing games, Supernatural requires several players: one person to be the Game Master and two to five others to play hunters such as Dean Winchester and Sam Winchester. It also requires a coin and multiple polyhedral dice ranging from four to twelve sides.

=== Setting ===
The Supernatural Role Playing Game is set in the world of the Supernatural TV series and focuses on an elite group of hunters who deal with supernatural threats that ordinary people do not believe exist. The first chapter of the book is called Be Afraid of the Dark. It was produced in 2009, before the fifth season had aired, and so does not contain any information from the series after this date. It instead uses information from the show and the novels.

=== Rules ===
Supernatural was the final role-playing game published using the Cortex Classic System, and the final one by Jamie Chambers. All subsequent games from Margaret Weis Productions have been produced under the Cortex Plus system. The system itself uses dice of various sizes ranging from two-sided (a coin) to twelve-sided for attributes, skills, assets (positive character traits), and complications (negative character traits). When attempting a challenging task, players roll the dice for the attribute, skill, and any relevant assets and complications, and compare against a target number decided by the Game Master. Character creation involves buying points by category, with a separate pool for skills and stats; the size of the pool depends on how powerful the characters are intended to be.

== History ==
The rights to the license were acquired in the spring of 2007 by Margaret Weis Productions, Ltd (MWP). It was also around this time that New York Times best-selling author Margaret Weis announced the license to Dragonlance was not renewed so the company could focus on the Supernatural RPG as well as their work on the Battlestar Galactica RPG. The Supernatural Role Playing Game was one of three new Cortex media games published by Margaret Weis Productions, one each year between 2007-2009, after the Battlestar Galactica Role Playing Game (2007) and the Demon Hunters Role Playing Game (2008). It was finally released in August 2009.

Early indications by Jamie Chambers place the first official event to be at Gen Con 2007 in Indianapolis, Indiana, which was said to include "two adventures that will allow players to experience the Supernatural Role Playing Game for the first time outside of our internal playtesting and development."

The reception was mixed, with Flames Rising declaring "If you are already a fan of the Supernatural TV show and want to play out the kind of adventures that happen to its protagonists, this book will come as a real treat. If you don’t know the show or are just looking for a game in which present-day heroes deal with supernatural menaces, this probably is not the game for you." Douglas Schules, writing for Transformative Works and Cultures concluded: "[The] Supernatural Role Playing Game doesn't contribute anything too novel to the genre of RPGs.... Even the incorporation of the television show's characters, monsters, and plots into the text as potential a campaign suggestions parallels industry practice, but this does not diminish the potential of players and game masters to appropriate the show and make it their own."
