= Demon Hunters Role Playing Game =

2008 role-playing game

The Demon Hunters Role Playing Game is a role-playing game published by Margaret Weis Productions in 2008.

== History ==
Three new Cortex System media games were published by Margaret Weis Productions, one each year between 2007 and 2009, including the Battlestar Galactica Role Playing Game (2007), the Demon Hunters Role Playing Game (2008), and the Supernatural Role Playing Game.

== Description ==
The Demon Hunters Role Playing Game was based on the films Demon Hunters and Demon Hunters: Dead Camper Lake by Dead Gentlemen Productions.
