= Leverage: The Roleplaying Game =

2010 tabletop role-playing game

- Designers: Cam Banks; Rob Donoghue
- Publishers: Margaret Weis Productions
- Publication: 2010
- Genres: Heist
- Systems: Cortex Plus

Leverage: The Roleplaying Game is a tabletop role-playing game based on the Leverage television series. It is designed for running a team of con artists who are trying to steal things back from the rich and powerful. It was designed by a team including Cam Banks, Rob Donoghue, and Clark Valentine, and uses the Cortex Plus system. Leverage is known for its innovative use of flashbacks to reproduce the con or heist genre and was nominated for the 2010 Origins Award for Best Roleplaying Game.

== Gameplay ==
Requirements to play are:

- 3–6 players
- A range of dice from 4-sided to 12-sided
- A character sheet for each player character
- Basic ideas for a villain to be conned and a plot twist
- Approximately 2–3 hours per episode/heist

Leverage uses the Cortex Plus system, with each player rolling a die for their chosen attribute, a skill that corresponds to one of the roles, and possibly dice for an asset, a distinction, or a talent. The total rolled on the best two dice is their result - and any result of a 1 creates a complication that may affect the story later. Leverage is also a game with Plot Points, and one use of a plot point is to create a flashback scene to explain how what appears to be happening in the game is simply what people can see.

== Setting ==
Leverage is set in a world very much like the real world. The game itself comes with a structure; each episode starts with a client finding the PCs because they've been wronged by someone too powerful to do something about. The powerful person, the Mark, has two reasons that they're untouchable by ordinary means, and two concealed weaknesses. Based on what they uncover, the PCs have to put together a confidence trick to take down the mark and ensure that justice is served. Halfway through the three-act structure, there is a plot twist, and the final act involves the team making their escape.

Each player plays the role of one of the team of con artists, with a character class based on the five characters in the show. The grifter, the hacker, the hitter, the mastermind, and the thief.

== History ==
Leverage was the second roleplaying game from Margaret Weis Productions to use their new Cortex Plus system.

== Reception ==
It was nominated for an Origins Award for best game. It was awarded 3.5/5 by RPGamer, with a 4 or higher in every category except the art. Shannon Appelcline notes that, like the first Cortex game, the Smallville Roleplaying Game, Leverage was well received.

Many of the development team, including joint lead designer Rob Donoghue, had previously worked for Evil Hat Productions. Reviewers have noticed similarities between Leverage and the Fate system.
