= Derek Pearcy =

Role-playing game designer

Derek Pearcy is a game designer, writer, editor and graphic designer known for his work on role-playing games.

== Career ==
Pearcy served as the editor of Pyramid for its first two print issues, in 1993. He worked for Steve Jackson Games in the 1990s. Pearcy was working as a staff member of Steve Jackson Games when they chose him to develop their own version of the French role-playing game In Nomine. SJG's In Nomine was published in 1997. In Nomine won the Origins Award for Best Graphic Presentation of a Roleplaying Game, Adventure, or Supplement of 1997. He was a special guest at HexaCon 9 in 1999.
