= Bitume =

French tabletop role-playing game

Bitume is a 1984 role-playing game designed and published by Croc.

== Gameplay ==
Bitume is a game in which a post-apocalyptic role-playing game is set in a world devastated by Halley's Comet, where survival means life on the road.

== Reviews ==
- Casus Belli #32
- Jeux & Stratégie #39
