= Stella Inquisitorus =

Tabletop role-playing game

Stella Inquisitorus ("Star Inquisitor") is a space opera setting for to the French supernatural role-playing game In Nomine Satanis / Magna Veritas. It was written by Croc and published in 1993 by Siroz. Characters play angels, demons, or pagan Space Vikings. It is compatible with, the Second Edition of the In Nomine Satanis / Magna Veritas rules.

== Plot overview ==
The plot is set in 6993 AD. At the dawn of the 21st century, God and Lucifer ended the Great Game and revealed their existence, thus triggering Armageddon.The factions fought in open and demanded that humans choose a side or die. A pagan faction, the Vikings, rejected both sides and sought "glorious" death in heroic combat. Earth became a radioactive wasteland after the Catholic Fleet bombarded the planet from orbit to defeat the Antichrist.

Later, faster-than-light travel by passing through Paradise or Hell was discovered, opening up space to colonization, though high technology is banned or controlled.

God formed the militantly Catholic Stella Vaticanum ("Star Vatican"), an empire that covers half of existing space. The masses under His protection are monitored by the Inquisition. Heresy or Ddmonic corruption in a subject planet's population is punished by genocide. The other half is controlled by the satanic Dunkle Reik ("Dark Empire"). Each subjugated planet is ruled by a Demon Lord viceroy who has moulded it to fit the incarnation of their Demon Prince's Word. The Demons harvest their subjects' souls to power weapons and starships.

== Accessories ==
- Gamemaster's Screen [1993]: A four-panel gamemaster's screen. It comes with a 16-page booklet containing a beginning scenario. It also includes stats for 6 Angelic starships, 6 Demonic starships, and 6 Viking starships.
- Stella Incognita [1993]: The space travel and space exploration sourcebook. Details the Stellae Incognitae ("Hidden Stars" - lost solar systems forgotten by both the Stella Vaticanum and Dunkle Reik) and the Independent Federations (isolated planets within Stella Vaticanum space). Includes a chapter on astronomy and rules for world creation.
- Strychnine IV [1993]: Details an entire solar system of four planets. There are five scenarios (2 Angelic, 2 Demonic and one that could be used for either - or both - sides). The first four concern each planet: the hotly contested farm planet of Haven I (now a sea of radioactive glass), the hostile jungle world of Virus II (where technology mysteriously malfunctions and the plant life is the apex predator), the fortified ice world of Cryo III (held by a fanatic Viking army against all comers) and the polluted industrial warzone world of Strychnine IV (where the seas are pure corrosive poison). The fifth scenario concerns a battle inside the besieged hulk of the Hellraiser - a powerful Dunkle Reik space battleship that would disrupt the balance of power should it escape.

== Reviews ==
- Casus Belli #74
