= In Nomine Game Master Pack =

Role-playing game supplement

In Nomine Game Master Pack is a 1997 role-playing game supplement published by Steve Jackson Games for In Nomine.

== Contents ==
In Nomine Game Master Pack is a supplement in which a screen with an accompanying adventure designed to accommodate player characters aligned with either Heaven or Hell, and the plot centers on a group of celestials tasked with recovering a dangerous demonic dagger. Their superiors each harbor hidden motives. The adventure launches with an air disaster and delves into mental unraveling, trauma, and moral ambiguity. PCs must confront and interrogate emotionally broken survivors.

== Publication history ==
In Nomine Game Master Pack was the first supplement for the new RPG system, comprising a gamemaster's screen with art by Dan Smith, and a 32-page adventure booklet by S. John Ross.

== Reception ==
Ken Walton reviewed In Nomine Game Master Pack for Arcane magazine, rating it a 6 out of 10 overall, and stated that "Overall, this is a well-plotted adventure, with a piece of barely useful cardboard attached to it, and costs the usual over-the-top price for this sort of thing."
