= Croc (game designer) =

French creator of role-playing and board games

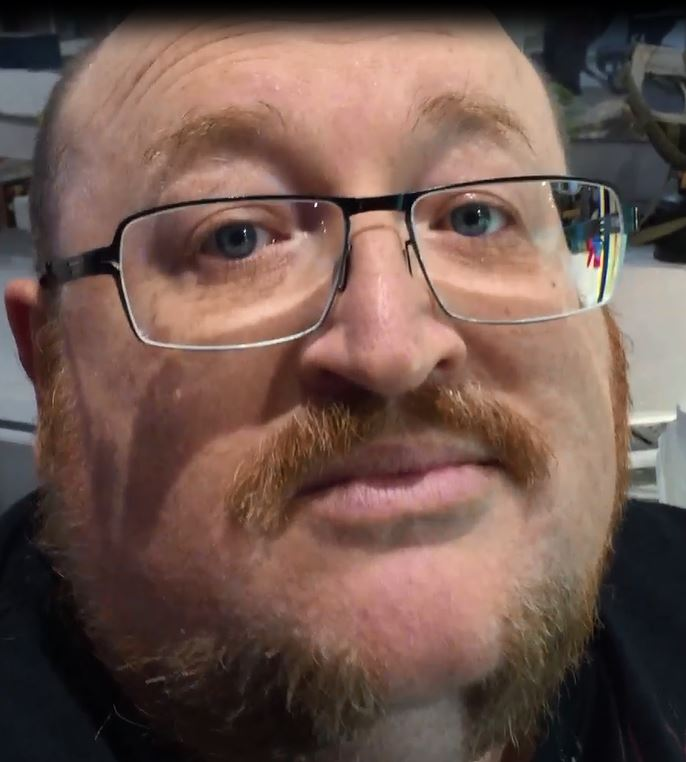
- Croc in 2015
- Born: Christophe Réaux; December 16, 1965 (age 60); France
- Occupation: Game designer
- Writing career
- Years active: 1986–present
- Genre: Role-playing games

Christophe Réaux (born December 16, 1965, France) largely and mainly known by the pseudonym Croc, is a French games designer, specialized in role-playing games (RPG) although he also has designed at least both a board game (L'Âge des dieux, Age of Gods) and a miniatures game (Hell Dorado). He is considered in his own country as a role-playing games pioneer and one of the most important designers in the ambit of such games. Croc's games are edited by Siroz (a homophone of the French word cirrhose, meaning "cirrhosis"), now called Asmodée éditions, French for Asmodeus. Croc met the founders of Siroz (Nicolas Théry, Éric Bouchaud and Laurent Tremmel) in the "20 Naturel" RPG club of Vélizy (near Versailles) in the mid-1980s at secondary school (high school).

One of his games, In Nomine Satanis/Magna Veritas (1989), led to the less controversial English-language game, In Nomine.

== Games ==
Croc's first game, Bitume (bitume being the French word for "asphalt") (created in 1984 and edited in 1986) is a post-apocalyptic Mad Max-style game. In the game, Harley's comet comes too close to Earth and causes a cataclysm that destroys civilisation.

Animonde (1988) is "poetic-fantasy" world, where technology (Middle-Age level) is replaced by animals (e.g. door hinges are crabs and swords are the legs of praying mantises).

In In Nomine Satanis/Magna Veritas (INS/MV, 1989), the contemporary world is the battleground of heaven and hell, in what looks like a war between two gangs or secret services. The character may adopt the role an angel or a demon, but these are very similar.

In Heavy Metal (1991), in a futuristic world, a great wall separates the rich inhabitants of the north and the poor of the south (Africa). This ultra-violent society is controlled by the CRU, the Cybernetic Repression Units (Unités de répression cybernétiques, URC). The player may play a robot from the CRU or a rebel standing against this situation. By interacting with humans, the CRU's begin to acquire human emotions and a conscience.

In Bloodlust (1991), a heroic fantasy world inspired by characters such as Conan and Elric, the gods have incarnated themselves into weapons with great magical powers, and exist in a symbiotic relationship with their human wielders.

Stella Inquisitorus (1993) is a space opera version of In Nomine Satanis/Magna Veritas that takes place in the year 6993.

In Scales (1994), a contemporary world, the player characters are dragons in human incarnations ignorant of their true nature that discover their powers little by little.

Nightprowler (1995) is a heroic fantasy game dedicated to thieves and assassins.

In C.O.P.S. (2003), the situation is close to the style of the John Carpenter movie Escape from L.A.. At the beginning of the twenty-first century, all of United States' pollution and criminals are sent to California; the state decides to stop this and declares its independence as a land of freedom. It is now 2030, and a strong police force is created to avoid the abuse of freedom and control that the criminal situation has inherited from the past. The characters are members of the C.O.P.S. (Central Organisation for Public Security), a section of the LAPD. This game is sometimes considered as the fourth edition of Berlin XVIII, a game edited in 1988 that took place in Berlin (Germany), with a social and political context marked by the Cold War (recall that this date was before the fall of the Berlin Wall); Berlin XVIII was edited by Siroz (first in the Universom collection then as a standalone game), created by Laurent Tremmel and Nicolas Thery (Croc contributed to the third edition).

== Translation work ==
Croc also translated the Car Wars boardgame and its GURPS Autoduel version (both edited and owned by Steve Jackson Games) into French, and contributes to Le Livre des cinq anneaux, the French version of AEG's Legend of the Five Rings, edited by Siroz/Asmodée, for which he had yet participated (among others) in the translation of the adventures supplement City of Lies (into French: La Cité des mensonges).

== See also ==
- Casus Belli (magazine)
