= Dice notation =

Method for describing dice rolls

Dice notation (also known as dice algebra, common dice notation, RPG dice notation, and several other titles) is a system to represent different combinations of dice in wargames and tabletop role-playing games using simple algebra-like notation such as d8+2.

== Standard notation ==
Probability mass function of a roll of 3d6 and probability density function of the normal distribution with the same mean and standard deviation.

In most tabletop role-playing games, die rolls required by the system are given in the form nds. n and s are variables, separated by the letter d, which stands for die or dice. The letter d is most commonly lower-case, but some forms of notation use upper-case D (non-English texts can use the equivalent form of the first letter of the given language's word for "dice", but also often use the English "d").

- n is the number of dice to be rolled (if n=1, then the notation is usually simplified to ds)
- s is the number of faces of each die. The faces are numbered from 1 to s, with the assumption that the die generates a random integer in that range, with uniform probability. A notable exception is the d10, which is labeled from 0 to 9, though the 0 can also be read as a 10.

For example, if a game calls for a roll of d4 or 1d4, it means "roll one 4-sided die."

If the final number is omitted, it is typically assumed to be a d6, but in some contexts, other defaults are used.

3d6 would mean "roll three six-sided dice." Commonly, these dice are added together, but some systems direct the choice of the best result rolled, or some other action.

To this basic notation, an additive modifier can be appended, yielding expressions of the form nds+c. The plus sign is sometimes replaced by a minus sign ("−") to indicate subtraction. c is a number to be added to the sum of the rolls. Therefore, 1d20−10 would indicate a roll of a single 20-sided die with 10 being subtracted from the result. These expressions can also be chained (e.g. 2d6+1d8), though this usage is less common. Additionally, notation such as nds-L is not uncommon. In this case, the "L" is used to represent the lowest result; it is sometimes replaced by an "H" to represent the highest result. For instance, 4d6−L means a roll of 4 six-sided dice, dropping the lowest result. This application skews the probability curve towards the higher numbers, as a result a roll of 3 can only occur when all four dice come up 1 (probability 1/1,296), while a roll of 18 results if any three dice are 6 (probability 21/1,296 = 7/432).

Rolling three or more dice gives a probability distribution that is approximately Gaussian, in accordance with the central limit theorem.

== History ==
Miniatures wargamers began using dice in the shape of Platonic solids in the late 1960s and early 1970s, to obtain results that could not easily be produced on a conventional six-sided die. Dungeons & Dragons emerged in this milieu, and was the first game with widespread commercial availability to use such dice. In its earliest edition (1974), D&D had no standardized way to call for polyhedral die rolls or to refer to the results of such rolls. In some places the text gives a verbal instruction; in others, it only implies the roll to be made by describing the range of its results. For example, the spell sticks to snakes says, "From 2–16 snakes can be conjured (roll two eight-sided dice)." When only a range is listed, the exact method of rolling can be ambiguous. For example, a typical random wilderness encounter might be a village of "30–300" orcs. A number in that range might be generated by rolling 3d10×10, or alternately by rolling 30d10.

D&D player Ted Johnstone introduced standard dice notation as a way to discuss probability distribution in an article, "Dice as Random Number Generators", in the inaugural issue of fanzine Alarums & Excursions (1975). The notation was also used by another writer, Barry Gold, in the same issue, and quickly spread throughout the fan community. Eventually, standard dice notation became so deeply ingrained in D&D fan culture that Gary Gygax would adopt it as a commonplace in the first edition of Advanced Dungeons & Dragons (1977–1979). The close association between D&D fandom and standard dice notation is reflected in the name of the Open Game version of the D&D rules: the "d20 System."

== Variations and expansions ==
=== Multipliers ===
In some games, the above notation is expanded to allow for a multiplier, as in AdX×C or C×dX, where:

- "×" denotes multiplication, and can be replaced by "/" or "÷" for division.
- C is a natural number (1 if omitted).

For example,

- 1d6×5 or 5×d6 means "roll one 6-sided die, and multiply the result by 5."
- 3d6×10+3 means "roll three 6-sided dice, add them together, multiply the result by 10, and then add 3."

Multiplication can also mean repeating throws of similar setup (usually represented by the letter "x", rather than the multiplication symbol):

- 3x(2d6+4) means "roll two 6-sided dice adding four to result, repeat the roll 3 times adding the results together."

=== Percentile dice (d%) ===
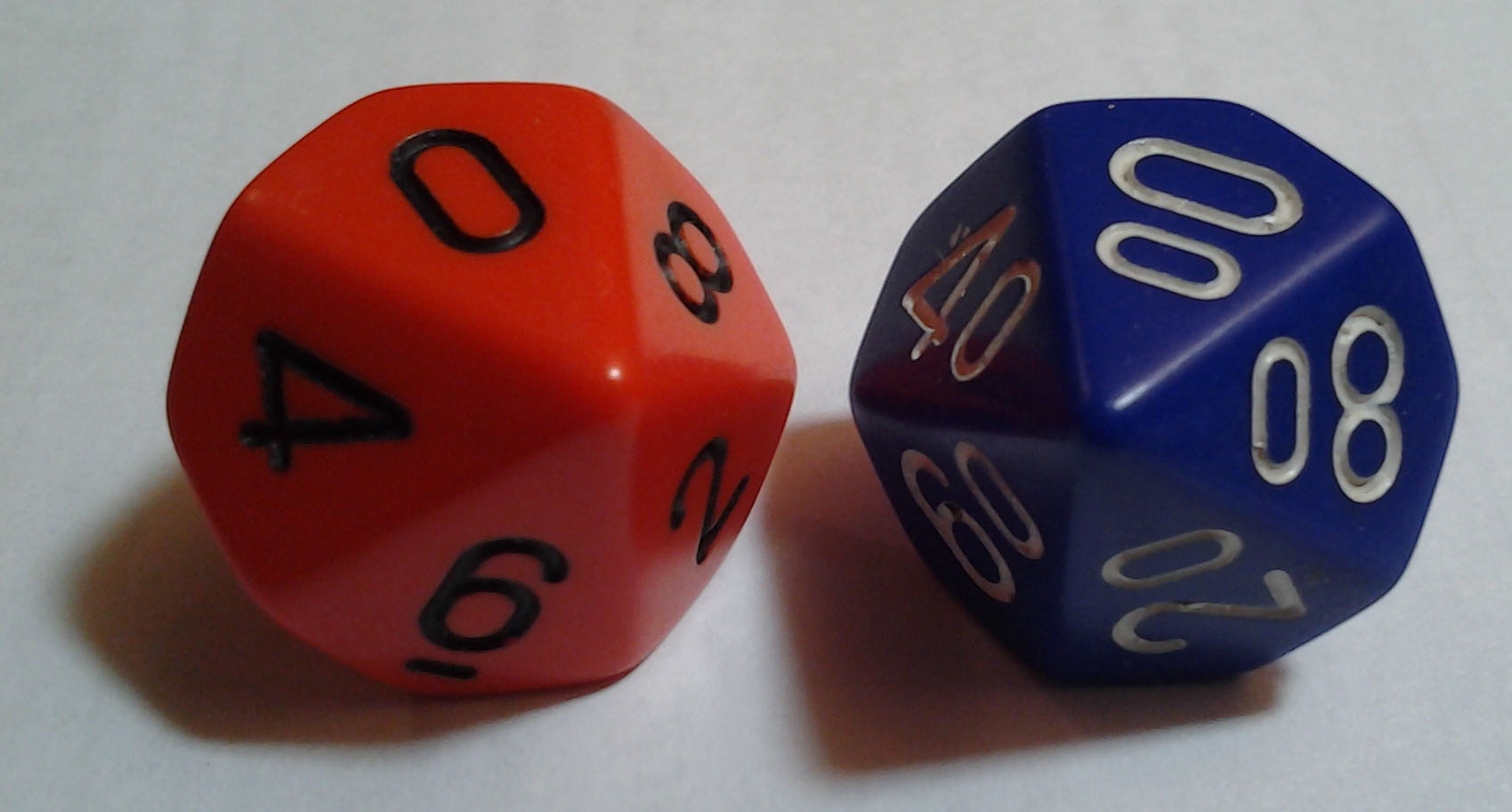
A typical pair of percentile dice including a "tens" die

Often, the variable X in the above notation will be 100, alternatively written "%". Although 100-sided dice exist, it is more common to use a combination of two ten-sided dice known as "percentile dice". One die represents units and the other tens; typically these are distinguished by color, but dice marked with multiples of ten are also available for use as the "tens" die. Ten-sided dice intended specifically for use as percentile dice typically have no tens notation (the faces are numbered such that there are two complete sequences of 0 through 9). A roll of 0 on both dice may be interpreted as either 0 or 100, depending on the game rules; however, it is rare for the 0 on the ones die to be read as 10, making a roll of zero on both dice equal to 10 (0 tens, and 10 ones).

The d1000 (using three 10-sided dice) is occasionally also seen, although it is more common in wargames than role-playing games.

Before the introduction of ten-sided dice around 1980, twenty-sided dice were commonly manufactured with two copies of each digit 0 to 9 for use as percentile dice. (Half could be given a distinct color, indicating the addition of ten, for use when randomizing numbers from 1 to 20.)

=== Selective results ===
A number of notational strategies exist for discarding only certain types of results.

Some games extend the standard notation to $A\text{d}X\text{k}(Y)+B$ or $A\text{d}X\text{k}Y+B$ where, in addition to the above, Y is the number of dice kept ("k") from the roll. Whether the dice omitted are the highest, lowest, or the player's choice depends on the game in question; "k" can be replaced with "kh", "kl", or "kc", respectively, to represent this, which also allows for combining them. In this case, $A\text{d}X\text{kh}H\text{kl}L\text{kc}C+B$, which means "roll A dice with X sides each, keeping the H highest, the L lowest, and C of the player's choice". Just as "B" is normally not shown when it is 0, terms where you would keep all of the dice are normally omitted for ease of reading. While "k" can be replaced with "d" to denote number of dice dropped instead of kept, this will result in two ds in the notation, so care must be kept (in particular, the number of sides can no longer be omitted unambiguously): $A\text{d}X\text{d}Y+B$ (here, the Y term is omitted when it is 0, meaning not dropping any dice), such as $4\text{d}6\text{dh}1\text{dl}1$, which means "roll 4 6-sided dice, dropping the highest and lowest"; this is preferable to keep notation, which has no way to convey keeping middle dice. 7th Sea and Legend of the Five Rings use only 10-sided dice, so it omits the number of sides, using notation of the form $8\text{k}6$, meaning "roll eight ten-sided dice, keep the highest six, and sum them." Although using a roll and keep system, Cortex Plus games all use roll all the dice of different sizes and keep two (normally the two best), although a Plot Point may be spent to keep an additional die, and some abilities let you keep a third automatically.

An alternative notation used by the OpenRoleplaying.org die roller uses "L" and "H" to denote the lowest and highest die, respectively, allowing B above to be replaced with this letter rather than a number; when used with a minus, this is equivalent to dropping the lowest or highest die, respectively, while when used with a plus, this lets you add the lowest or highest die to the total again, which is equivalent to doubling the lowest or highest die.

=== Dice pools ===
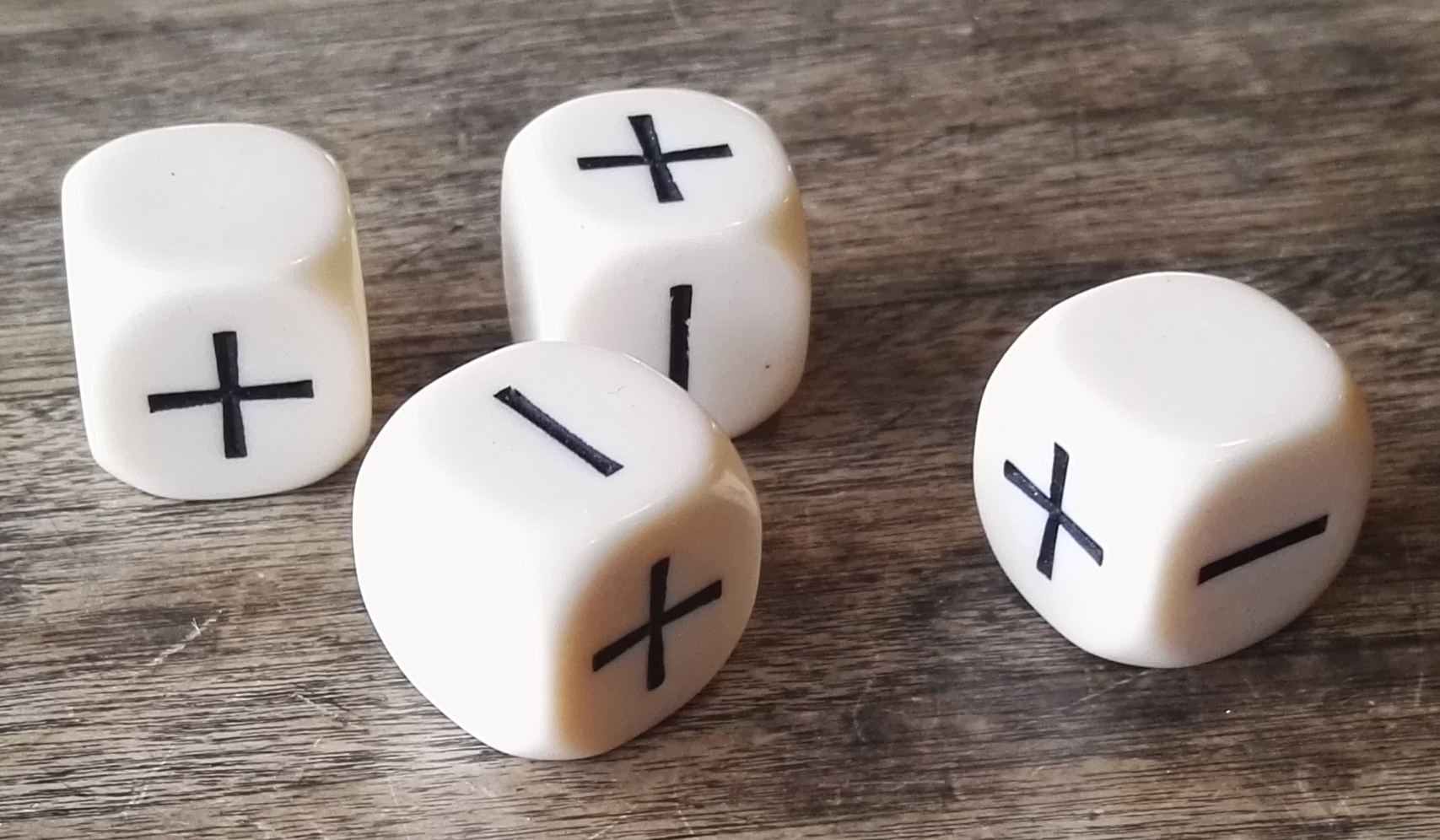
Fudge dice

A number of games including the original Ghostbusters role-playing game, the Storyteller system, and Fantasy Flight Games' Star Wars Roleplaying Games use a system where a dice pool consisting of an indicated number of dice are rolled and the total number of dice which meet a fixed condition are recorded as the result. For example, Vampire: The Requiem has players roll a pool of ten-sided dice and note the number that come up as 8 or higher as "successes". Some companies produce custom dice, marked with successes and failures, for use in games which use this mechanic.

The Fudge role-playing system uses a set of dice which are each marked with minus signs, plus signs and blank sides, meaning −1, +1 and 0 respectively. The default is one third of each, usually represented by a six-sided die with two of each, known as dF.2 or just dF. Four of these (4dF) are rolled to determine results from −4 to +4, which is equivalent to 4d3−8. Variants include dF.1, which is a six-sided die with four blanks, one plus and one minus.

=== 6-sided variations ===
Various Games Workshop systems such as Necromunda and Mordheim use an anomalously-named D66 roll, meaning d6×10+d6. This sort of roll originated in the Game Designers' Workshop (no relation) game, Traveller, to roll on various tables and charts, usually involving encounters, but did not use the notation. There are 36 possible results ranging from 11 to 66. The D66 is a base-six variant of the base ten percentile die (d100). The D66 is generally a combination of two six-sided dice, often made distinguishable from each other by color, or simply one die rolled twice. The first die represents the tens digit, and the second die the ones digit. For example, a roll of 1 followed by a roll of 5 will give a total of 15, while a roll of 3 followed by a roll of 6 will give a total of 36. The average result of the D66 is 38.5, and the standard deviation about 17.16.

Blood Bowl, also a Games Workshop product, introduces the block die with special notation Xdb, which is shorthand for $|X|\text{d}6\text{k}1$ (roll the absolute value of X in 6-sided dice and keep 1), where the sign of X specifies whether the attacker (if positive) or defender (if negative) chooses which die to keep; X is usually omitted when 1, and as −1 and 1 are equal, −1 is never used. Common values are 3, 2, 1, −2, or −3. Alternatively, the words "for" and "against" can be used to replace X's sign, where "against" means negative and "for" means positive; the word is placed after the rest of the formula. As an example, $2\text{db against}$ is equal to $\text{−}2\text{db}$, which both mean "roll 2 6-sided dice, defender chooses from the results rolled".

In Nomine, from Steve Jackson Games, uses a three-dice variation called the d666. However, this is actually a combination of 2d6 (for determining success or failure) and 1d6 (for determining degree of success or failure). The notation of d666 is a reference to the number of the beast.

Planet Mercenary calls its variation d6³, to indicate that in addition to using the conventional sum of 3d6 to check for success or failure, various secondary effects are determined via comparison of the individual numbers rolled. These include whether a specially marked die (called the Mayhem die) has rolled highest, the lowest number rolled, and whether any two dice show the same number.

One other commonly used variant of the 6-sided dice roll is the d3, which is a 6-sided die roll, with the result divided by 2. The average result is 2, and the standard deviation is 0.816.

=== 10-sided variations ===
The Cyborg Commando role-playing game by Gary Gygax uses a dice mechanic called d10x. This is equivalent to d10×d10 and gives a non-linear distribution, with most results concentrated at the lower end of the range. The mean result of d10x is 30.25 and its standard deviation is about 23.82.

=== Open-ended variations ===
Several games use mechanics that allow one or more dice to be rerolled (often a die that rolls the highest possible number), with each successive roll being added to the total. Terms for this include open-ended rolling, exploding dice, and penetration rolls. Games that use such a system include Feng Shui and Savage Worlds. On Anydice, the function to make dice explode on their highest value is simply called explode. Notational shorthand for exploding dice is to suffix the roll with an exclamation point: AdX! or 6d6!, asterisk AdX*, or the letter ‘X’ AdXX.

The Storyteller system combines exploding dice with a dice pool threshold and target number. Diana: Warrior Princess explodes all successes, and Hackmaster uses a variant called dice penetration by which 1 is subtracted from the total of the rerolled dice.
