= Smallville Roleplaying Game =

Tabletop superhero role-playing game

- Cover
- Designers: Cam Banks
- Publishers: Margaret Weis Productions
- Publication: 2010
- Genres: Superhero; Drama; Science fiction; Fantasy
- Systems: Cortex Plus

The Smallville Roleplaying Game is a superhero-themed role-playing game published in 2010 by Margaret Weis Productions, set in the universe of the television series Smallville (which is based on the DC comic book character Superman).

== Game and setting ==
Players may take the roles of Clark Kent, Lois Lane, other characters from Smallville, or their own original characters. The game mechanics focus on inter-personal conflict and narrative, rather than raw power.

Character generation in the Smallville RPG is a collaborative process, with characters going through their lives together step by step and deciding how their histories are woven together.

There are two main ways to run the Smallville Roleplaying Game. Players might use the official Smallville setting, or the life-path system that encourages players to create an original setting involving a coming-of-age drama with superpowers. The rulebook allows players to create Smallville itself using the game's character creation rules, demonstrated using the season 9 protagonists Clark Kent, Lois Lane, Chloe Sullivan, Tess Mercer, and General Zod.

== Cortex Plus system ==
The Smallville Roleplaying Game was the first of the new role-playing games from Margaret Weis Productions to utilize their new Cortex Plus system. The Smallville Roleplaying Game was designed by the game's line developer Cam Banks, and indie role-playing game publisher, Miriam Robern.

Smallville is currently the only iteration of Cortex Plus Drama outside the generic Cortex Plus Hackers' Guide.

== Supplements ==
Two supplements for the Smallville RPG were published before Margaret Weis Productions lost the license at the end of February 2013: Smallville: The High School Yearbook (for playing high school characters using the Smallville system) and Smallville: The Watchtower Report.

== Reception ==
The game won a Judge's Spotlight Award at the 2011 ENnies.

Reception upon publication was a mix of positive surprise.

RPGamer declared: "The Smallville RPG is perhaps the most peculiar release of this year. Everything about its cover screams 'mediocre at best'... But this volume proves that one should never judge a book by its cover" and the book "will reveal that Smallville is a great story game ideally suited for teen drama that has been cunningly disguised as a cheap TV tie-in".

io9 was equally surprised: "So I'll admit that when I saw the Margaret Weis Productions booth at Gen Con stacked with Supernatural, Smallville and Serenity RPGs, a small voice in the back of my head was saying, 'These could be pretty bad'....The Smallville RPG is a finely crafted game that understands the quirks of the show and the things about it that its fans love."

== See also ==
- Marvel Heroic Roleplaying
- Leverage: The Roleplaying Game
- Cortex System
- Monsterhearts
