= The World of Synnibarr =

Poorly received tabletop roleplaying game

- The World of Synnibarr, 2nd edition
- Designers: Raven C.S. McCracken; Bryce Thelin
- Publishers: Wonderworld Press
- Publication: 1991 (first edition); 1993 (second edition)
- Genres: Multi-genre
- Website: synnibarr.com

The World of Synnibarr (sometimes referred to simply as Synnibarr) is a multi-genre role-playing game published by Wonderworld Press and written by Raven c.s. McCracken. A second edition of the game, co-written by Bryce Thelin, was published in 1993.

The game features an unusual amount of variety in play. It combines elements of fantasy, science fiction, superhero and other genres and occasionally lends itself to power gaming.

A third edition of Synnibarr was funded by a Kickstarter in 2013, which was expected to be released in 2015. The Kickstarter project was completed and satisfied in 2021/2022.

== Setting ==
Synnibarr is set on Mars 50,000 years in the future, hollowed out and turned into a spaceship to take humanity to a safe place after Earth was destroyed. Civilization is beginning to be rebuilt after a series of disasters, and technology is practiced as a religion.

Synnibarr is also noted for bizarre monsters, including the Giant Mutant Fire Clam and the Flying Grizzly, the latter being capable of shooting laser beams from its eyes. Guilds and organizations play a major role in the Synnibarr "Worldship". Mortals are often able to interact with immortals, demi-gods and even the gods themselves.

== System ==
Most rolls are of percentile dice (d100), though some are additive while others use a roll-under mechanic (aiming to roll below a target number on the d100). The third edition game mechanic replaces the previous percentile system with a streamlined skill-based system, where resolve and experience create cogency levels that are pitted against opposing cogency levels for determining results.

McCracken and a group of other people have been playing and developing Synnibarr since the mid-'90s. In December 2012 a Kickstarter was launched to publish a new edition. The project was expected to span three books: an "Ultimate Adventurer's Guide", a "Worldship Atlas", and a "Book of Fate". The "Ultimate Adventurer's Guide" was published in August 2018, and as of March 2022 rewards have been fulfilled.

== Reception ==
In Issue 38 of White Wolf, Ed Walker called this an "Epic adventure. [...] The 475-page, single-volume system takes a long time to read, but if you like your adventures BIG, it is worth it." Walker found the artwork "stunning" but found the character creation system "confusing if you're not careful." Walker also noted that the wide-ranging damage system "can easily get out of control if the referee is not careful." Walker pointed out that "the game involves a lot of math, and some of the conversions don't work smoothly." Walker concluded by giving the game a rating of 3 out of 5, saying, "It is a bit unwieldy, but Synnibarr is a fine system and a great concept. The good points easily outweigh the bad points ... I recommend Synnibarr. The descriptions of monsters, characters and locations alone make it a great supplement for any campaign."

In contrast, Darren MacLennan criticized the game for its exceptionally poor design.

Game developer John Tynes agreed with MacLennan, calling it a "terrible self-published role-playing game" responsible for making its developer "legendary" in the industry. Mike Selinker reported opinions of Synnibarr being the worst role-playing game ever. He did not quite agree himself, but criticized the needlessly complicated mechanisms of its rules which create unnecessary work for the person conducting the game.

Writing in Pyramid, game designer Steven Marsh noted "Apparently, the GM is expected to take detailed notes on everything, and if the GM deviates from those notes, then the players get extra experience points ... I would have a hard time reconciling this rule with my style of GMing as I tend to deviate slightly from my notes." Marsh concluded by telling other gamemasters, "if you do make up stuff [in other games] that's wildly unpopular with the players, maybe you can placate them by giving them some extra experience points... or offering to switch the campaign to World of Synnibarr.
