= In Nomine Satanis/Magna Veritas =

1989 French role-playing game

- German In Nomine Satanis/Magna Veritas cover
- Designers: Croc
- Publishers: Siroz
- Publication: 1989 (1st edition); 1993 (2nd edition); 1997 (3rd edition); 2003 (4th edition); 2015 (5th edition)
- Genres: Horror
- Systems: Custom

In Nomine Satanis/Magna Veritas is a French role-playing game, created by Croc. In Nomine Satanis ("In Satan's Name") was the Demonic player's guide and Magna Veritas ("The Great Truth") was the Angelic player's guide.

In Nomine Satanis/Magna Veritas (often abbreviated as INS/MV) was first designed by the French company Siroz, as of 2003 available in its fourth edition. The French edition of the game was stopped in 2006, with the publication of the sourcebook On Ferme ! (meaning "We close!"). The game relates the events told in the Bible in a somewhat parodical fashion, and explains the existence of other religions and magic with a sense of humor. The backdrop for the game is the modern world, but one where angels and demons incarnate themselves in human bodies in order to fight for good or evil.

The game is somewhat akin to a superhero game, with player characters (PCs) having supernatural powers (fueled by power points) and abilities usually far beyond those of a human. A typical adventure includes a lot of inquiry, detective work and roleplay, sprinkled with a few conflicts followed by a big, final showdown. PCs are supposed to keep secret the existence of supernatural entities, so, in their human guises, have a somewhat "normal" existence. This is often downplayed, however, as many players don't wish to roleplay their character's human guise of (for example) an accountant.

== Custom system ==
The system is based on a "666-sided" dice, the designers' name for three six-sided dice interpreted as follows: the first and second dice read as the tens and units, are used to determine success or failure, while the third die determines the degree of success. Modifiers are applied to the dice depending on the difficulty of the task at hand. A result of 111 counts as a critical success for angels, while 666 is a critical failure; the results are the opposite for demons.

Each character has an angelic or demonic superior, from which he gains some abilities and a general outlook, and which he can try to summon for help. They are also subject to a hierarchy to which they must report to, and which controls the characters' improvement.

== Other versions ==
Apart from English, the 2nd Edition of the game has also been translated as In Nomine: Magna Veritas in German [Truant Verlag (1993)], Spanish [Joc Internacional, (1994)] & Polish. The Polish version, called In Nomine Magnae Veritatis was published in 1996.

=== Stella Inquisitorius ===
Croc also created a space opera sequel to this game, Stella Inquisitorus (1993), that takes place in the year 6993.

=== In Nomine (Steve Jackson Games) ===
The 1997 American game In Nomine is based on INS/MV, but the original is considered "much more tongue-in-cheek than the American game". This was also adapted to GURPS in 2000 as GURPS In Nomine.

== The 5th edition (2015) ==
In 2015, a successful crowdfunding campaign provided the budget (in reality, more than 700% of the asked-for budget) for an upcoming new French edition, called INS/MV : Génération Perdue (transl. "INS/MV: Lost Generation").

== Reviews ==
- Backstab #5
- Backstab #45
- Jeux et Stratégie nouvelle formule #8
- Magia i Miecz (Issue 38 - Feb 1997) (Polish)
- Świat Gier Komputerowych #65 (Polish)
