= In Nomine (role-playing game) =

Tabletop role-playing game

- Designers: Derek Pearcy
- Publishers: Steve Jackson Games
- Publication: 1997; 29 years ago
- Genres: horror
- Systems: Custom (d666)

In Nomine is a role-playing game designed by Derek Pearcy and published in 1997 by Steve Jackson Games, based on the French game In Nomine Satanis/Magna Veritas. Players typically assume the role of angels and demons in a setting that draws heavily from traditional Christianity.

== Setting ==
The game combines the supernatural with mundane reality, with campaigns often set in the modern world. Supernatural characters take on a human (or other mundane) form to further their various agendas. Although individual campaigns can focus on combat or direct conflict, Heaven and Hell settled into a cold war called the "Great Game". Angels and demons typically struggle indirectly, by attempting to draw humans closer to their respective sides. Open hostilities are costly, and, in the game setting, rarely prove to be the most efficient option. This allows In Nomine to have the qualities of a morality play as well as those of a more standard role-playing game.

Angels and demons, collectively termed celestials, are sorted into different Choirs (angelic) or Bands (demonic). Musical themes permeate the literature. For example, all of creation is collectively termed "The Symphony", and "spells" do not exist; celestial powers are either Resonances, Attunements, or Songs. Every Choir or Band has a "resonance" associated with it, a unique way in which they interact with the Symphony that functions as a supernatural ability.

A celestial generally also has two sets of "dissonance conditions" that determine how they acquire notes of dissonance. One set comes from the base Choir or Band, and the other set comes from the Word they serve. Violating these conditions involves fundamentally rejecting their identity (for demons) or their place in the Symphony (for angels), and this rejection manifests itself in dissonance. Dissonance impairs a celestial's abilities in certain ways, and is keyed to spiritual anguish. For example, Seraphim see lies plainly (via use of their resonance) and in turn cannot bring themselves to lie without betraying their natures (which earns them dissonance). Acquiring notes of dissonance, in turn, interferes with their ability to use their resonance. Thus, once an angel starts distancing itself from the Symphony, it runs the risk of getting caught in a vicious cycle that leads it further and further from its angelic nature - and down the path to Falling. Bands do not tend to have a similar problem; redeeming a demon typically requires Superior intervention, whereas an angel can Fall spontaneously by itself.

Angels and demons usually work for one of the thirteen main Archangels or fourteen main Demon Princes. These are celestials who are each bound to a powerful "Word," or fundamental concept. Not every Word-bound celestial is a Superior; only the most important, most powerful, and most knowledgeable earn Superior status. For instance, Michael is the Archangel of War. Doxas, Angel of Glory, is his lieutenant and, while respected, does not bear the title and responsibilities of Archangel. Generally, angels must ask their Superior to sponsor them for a Word before the Seraphim Counsel. Once they have asked their superior if they may be granted a word, they will have to explain their reasoning for being gifted this honour. If their answer is to their superior's satisfaction, then they will be brought before the Seraphim council where they will be given a task to perform (usually in some way related to the word they seek to obtain). If there are any other angels who wish to also have this word, they would be tested simultaneously. The one who successfully completes the task to the best of his/her ability would then be granted the word.

Demons have a similar task, rallying support for becoming Word-bound. But because there is no demonic equivalent of the Seraphim council, they have to either request their Superior intercede for them, or go into Lower Hell and speak with Lucifer himself on the matter. Depending on his mood, he might kill them on the spot, grant them a Word on the spot, or give them a task to fulfill, but completing a task does not ensure the word is theirs; he may deny them the word, grant them a lesser word, or grant them a word they didn't want.

The Archangel or Demon Prince which a character works for shapes their nature, personality, abilities, and restrictions as much as their Choir or Band. Words can change subtly if a Demon Prince redeems or an Archangel Falls - for instance, Andrealphus, the Demon Prince of (selfish) Lust, was once the Archangel of (selfless) Love. Both Heaven and Hell (especially the latter) are divided on many important matters. For example, Michael's militant stance towards Hell clashes with that of Novalis, the peace-loving Archangel of Flowers, and that of Jean, Archangel of Lightning, who favors a moderate approach between the two extremes. Most Archangels are hesitant to support one particular religion, but Dominic (Judgment) and Laurence (the Sword) take extra pains to promote Catholicism, while Khalid (Faith) is avowedly Muslim.

The game offers no definitive answer as to whether the fallen angels had justification to rebel, although, in practice, most games tend to default to the assumption that Heaven is in fact seeking to further the overall cause of good, and Hell to undermine it. One can play a "backwards" game as freedom fighters based in Hell fighting against angelic oppression just as easily as a "straight" game sympathetic to the angels. To accommodate both these perspectives, game literature often describes a morally gray universe, where angelic and demonic forces sometimes work together for mutual benefit. Both Heaven and Hell are home to a great many political schemers and powerful secret police.

Supplements to the line include books on humans (aware or unaware of the conflict) and ethereal spirits (creatures born of dreams), which can be player characters or non-player characters.

== System ==
The default mechanic of the system is the "d666." This consists of a roll of three six-sided dice; the first two are added together and compared to a target number to determine success or failure, the third determines the degree of success or failure. The third digit is often referred to as the "check digit," or "CD." Rolling all 1s or all 6s results in an "intervention" - divine or infernal, respectively - essentially filling the role of a spectacular success or failure. However, how it affects the player depends on the side he has chosen. Rolling 1, 1, 1 (the Holy Trinity) is a Divine Intervention and always benefits Heaven, making it a critical success for an angelic player, but a critical failure for a demonic player. Rolling 6, 6, 6 (the Number of the Beast, sometimes referred to as the freight train from Hell) results in an Infernal Intervention which has the opposite effects.

Though there are numerous powers players can purchase with experience or earn through missions, the rules themselves are at a level of simplicity that stands in stark contrast to the complex politics and baroque cosmology. Most agree that this results in In Nomine achieving flexibility and simplicity, but not game balance.

The In Nomine Game Master Pack was published in 1997.

=== GURPS ===
GURPS In Nomine is a third edition GURPS adaptation of the In Nomine setting released in June 2000.

== Reception ==
Andy Butcher reviewed In Nomine for Arcane magazine, rating it a 7 out of 10 overall, and stated that "The In Nomine rules provide the framework for an impressive game system, and there's a lot to recommend them. On the other hand, though, they're let down by poor organisation and a lack of background information. Good, but not as good as you might expect after the long development time."

In the November 1997 edition of Dragon (Issue 241), Rick Swan complimented Steve Jackson Games for tackling "a volatile premise head on." While he liked the streamlined rules, Swan thought the game's most impressive achievement "is not a vivid setting nor its imaginative mechanics, but its respectful, even reverent treatment of a sensitive subject." He concluded, "Ambitious, chilling and absolutely, positively not for children. Or Jerry Falwell."

In his 2023 book Monsters, Aliens, and Holes in the Ground, RPG historian Stu Horvath noted that this game "takes itself rather seriously. The world of In Nomine is surprisingly, emphatically rendered in shades of gray ... The game never chooses a side — good and bad outcomes are a matter of perspective."

== Awards ==
In Nomine won the Origins Award for Best Graphic Presentation of a Roleplaying Game, Adventure, or Supplement of 1997.

== Other reviews and commentary ==
- Valkyrie #14 (1997)
- Shadis #34 (1996)
- Backstab (Issue 2 - Mar/Apr 1997)
- Rollespilsmagasinet Fønix (Danish) (Issue 17 - June 1997)
- Envoyer (German) (Issue 23 - Sep 1998)
- Casus Belli #102
