= Battlestar Galactica Role Playing Game =

Tabletop role-playing game

The Battlestar Galactica Role Playing Game is a role-playing game published by Margaret Weis Productions in 2007, based on the Battlestar Galactica franchise.

== History ==
Margaret Weis announced in 2007 that the license to Dragonlance was not renewed so that the company could focus on the Supernatural RPG as well as their work on the Battlestar Galactica RPG. In 2007 Margaret Weis Productions published the Battlestar Galactica Role Playing Game. Three new Cortex media games were published by Margaret Weis Productions, one each year between 2007 and 2009, including the Battlestar Galactica Role Playing Game (2007), the Demon Hunters Role Playing Game (2008), and the Supernatural Role Playing Game (2009). The Battlestar Galactica role-playing game was released in August 2007 by Margaret Weis Productions at Gen Con.

== Description ==
The Cortex System was used for MWP's licensed Battlestar Galactica and Supernatural RPGs, and brought out as a stand-alone system in the Cortex System Role Playing Game book.

== Reception ==
The Battlestar Galactica Role Playing Game gained praise from SF Weekly for the Plot Point mechanisms and the way they reproduced the all-or-nothing moments of the Battlestar Galactica television series.
