= Dice pool =

Role-playing game mechanic

In some role-playing game (RPG) systems, rather than rolling a single die to determine the success or failure of an action, the player rolls a number of dice simultaneously, known as a dice pool. The number and type of dice to be rolled are defined by the mechanics of the game.

== Definition ==
In his 2022 paper "Icepool: Efficient Computation of Dice Pool Probabilities", Albert Julius Liu defined the term "dice pool":

While some dice mechanics determine the result from a roll of a single die, others have a player or players rolling a "pool" of multiple dice. For most such mechanics, all of the dice are thrown simultaneously and without order, with the dice being treated as indistinguishable other than the number they show. In other words, the roll of a pool is fully described by a multiset. The in-game consequences of the roll are then evaluated as a function of the multiset according to the rules of the game.

== The use of dice pools ==
Jenny Ford of the British game publisher Man o' Kent Games points out that for a game designer, using a dice pool rather than a single die has the advantage of probability control: "Game designers want to give players a certain experience, and to give that experience they need to have some chance of predicting what will happen to their players. That means that totally random results [from rolling a single die] are difficult to use consistently to produce a desired player experience ... Rolling lots of dice at once ... will tend towards the mean." In essence, if a lot of dice are rolled, the average of all of the dice rolled will approach the mean of the die used. For example, rolling 10 six-sided dice should result in about half of the dice being 4 or more. The game designer can then express success as the number of dice with a given value — say 4 or more — allowing the designer to more accurately control the probable outcome of the desired action.

== Mechanics ==
In many RPG systems, non-trivial actions often require dice rolls. Some RPGs roll a fixed number of dice, add a number to the die roll based on the character's attributes and skills, and compare the resulting number with a difficulty rating. In other systems, the character's attributes and skills determine the number of dice to be rolled.

Dice pool systems generally use a single size of die, the most common being six- or ten-sided dice (d6s or d10s), though in some games a character's Attributes or Skills may determine the size of the dice in the pool, as well as their number (such as Deadlands). While such games may require different sized dice for different rolls, the dice in a given pool are usually all the same size.

The results on each die may be added together and compared to a target number (as in Over the Edge first and second editions), or the player may count the number of dice which roll higher than a specified target number, and compare that to a required number of "successes" (as in early editions of Shadowrun or the Storyteller System). In systems using the latter method, the target number required for a success may be fixed (the same for every roll) or variable (assigned depending on the difficulty of a task); the number of successes required may indicate the degree of success, or a minimum number of successes may be required as another means of determining difficulty. Another variation is that a number of dice are rolled, but only some are added together (as in the "Roll and Keep" system used by Legend of the Five Rings and 7th Sea).

=== Modifying the dice pool ===
In dice pool systems it is common to add or subtract dice from the pool to represent different circumstances.

Penalties may temporarily reduce the dice pool for one or more skills (for example, a leg wound may reduce the dice pool for actions such as running, climbing, and jumping), and are usually fixed numbers (the leg wound may reduce a pool by two dice).

Bonuses may temporarily increase dice pools, and usually represent beneficial circumstances (e.g. a character may have a powerful computer to aid her in a database search) or some special effort on the character's part (an effort of will, a strong desire to succeed, or even a supernatural power). Circumstantial bonuses are also usually fixed numbers – for example, the aforementioned computer might grant two additional dice – while character traits which grant bonuses are usually an expendable resource, representing special effort. This may take the form of "points" (e.g. "Willpower points" in the Storytelling System), or an extra pool of dice which may be allocated to other pools to augment rolls (e.g. the Combat and Karma pools of earlier editions of Shadowrun).

Other complications may be used to simulate luck, superhuman ability or other conditions; a common one is to allow high (or low) rolling dice to be rolled again, the second roll counting as if it were an additional die.

== Advantages and problems ==
Dice pools are more complex to explain and less intuitive than traditional "roll over" or "roll under" systems, though they are faster to resolve if there are a lot of modifiers, as it is easier to count each individual die that succeeded than it is to add four or five separate modifiers to a die roll. They also provide players with a physical representation for the modifiers, as real, concrete dice are added to the pool (or taken away from it).

The other thing dice pools allow is opening up a lot of design space for game designers; if something other than the number on the dice is important, the number itself can be used to add richness to the system.

- Exploding Dice as used in the Storyteller System or Diana: Warrior Princess involve counting each maximum result on a die as a success – and rolling it again to see what the extra die does. This can create some impressive outcomes where luck favours the character.
- Counting Sets as used in One-Roll Engine games like Monsters and Other Childish Things gives a method of separating whether a character succeeded from how successful they are, and introduces a risk element.
- Drama Dice as used in Seventh Sea and Fortune Dice as used in Star Wars: Edge of the Empire allow for abstract one shot rewards where the actual effect is unknown.
- Keep the two highest as used in Marvel Heroic Roleplaying and other Cortex Plus games is a hybrid with the roll-over system, which uses the dice pool's ability to add modifiers without introducing much math while having the simplicity of traditional roll-over.
- Some results are botches again as used in Marvel Heroic Roleplaying and other Cortex Plus games as well as Star Wars: Edge of the Empire allow a combination of a very successful attempt at what a character is trying to and a lot of collateral damage. It can also serve to limit the desired size of the dice pool as more dice produce diminishing returns in terms of success while providing more probability of botches.
  - Early versions of the Storyteller System used a version of this by which if a player rolled a 1, his character suffered a critical failure rather than just negative consequences. This made rolling botches (critical failures) more likely the higher the skill or attribute as these added more dice. This problem was eliminated in the Revised version of the system and later derivatives by stating that a botch only occurred if no normal successes were scored and at least one die is a 1.

== History ==
West End Games's Ghostbusters role-playing game by Greg Stafford, Lynn Willis, and Sandy Petersen featured a d6 system with an additive dice pool that was applied to both characteristics and skills. The first widely successful game to feature dice pools was Greg Costikyan's Star Wars: The Roleplaying Game (1987), developing the system pioneered the year before in Ghostbusters.

Shadowrun (1989), designed by Bob Charrette, Paul Hume, and Tom Dowd, used a comparative dice pool, in which players roll a set of six-sided dice and each die rolled was compared to a target number to determine if that die was a success or a failure, with the number of successes determining the outcome of the action taken. Shadowrun was probably the first game to use the "success" mechanic rather than adding the dice together. Dowd refined the dice pool system for White Wolf Publishing's Vampire: The Masquerade (1991). Vampire: The Masquerade and Over the Edge (1992) were written by Ars Magica designers Mark Rein-Hagen and Jonathan Tweet respectively, the pair having been impressed by the potential of the dice pool mechanic and each having decided to make their own game based on dice pools. The majority of White Wolf Publishing's subsequent games use variations on Vampire's Storyteller System and use its dice pool mechanic.

Although not an RPG, the fantasy board game Titan uses a dice pool mechanic for combat, in which the various pieces roll a pool of dice based on their Power rating and count the number of hits based on the difference between their Skill rating and the target's Skill rating.
