= Cortex System =

Role-playing game system

The Cortex System is a collection of related roleplaying games. Its most recent iteration, Cortex Prime, was designed by Cam Banks and initially published by Fandom Tabletop, then acquired by Dire Wolf Digital. Prior versions appeared in the licensed roleplaying games published by Margaret Weis Productions, where it was used as the house system. Cortex is an adaptable game system focusing on characterization and story development.

== Game mechanics ==
Cortex is an extendable and modifiable game, but with some consistent mechanics. Characters are described with a number of trait sets, such as attributes, skills, relationships, or powers. Each trait within each set is rated with a die size. For example, a strong but unintelligent character might have Brawn d10 and Brains d4. When rolling dice, players select one trait from each set and roll their dice together as a pool. Dice that roll 1 are 'hitches', and represent something going wrong in the attempt. The highest two die results are added together for the player character's effective total. Another die not used in the total is selected as the effect die, the size of which determines the magnitude of the die roll's effect.

Players have access to a limited pool of "plot point" tokens, which can be spent in a number of ways. Prominent among these is to roll more than one die from a single trait set, or to add additional die results to the total.

Most Cortex games include Distinctions as one of the trait sets, which describe what makes the character distinctive. These traits are rolled as a d8 when they are beneficial. When the distinction hinders the character, however, it is rolled as a d4, and the player earns a plot point.

== History ==
Sovereign Stone, produced by Sovereign Press, Inc and published by Corsair Publishing, based on the eponymous novels of Margaret Weis and Tracy Hickman, was the earliest iteration of the system. The game was written by Larry Elmore and Don Perrin.

=== Cortex Classic ===
In 2004, the rights to the 'Sovereign Stone game was transferred to Margaret Weis Productions, where the system was used for the Serenity Role Playing Game, published in 2005. The game system was used, with minor amendments, for the Battlestar Galactica Role Playing Game in 2007 and the Supernatural Role Playing Game in 2009. The underlying system was released as Cortex Role Playing Game System. In an interview with the "Tabletop Talk Podcast" from August 2025 Cam Banks stated, that the name "Cortex" was chosen for the name of the internet in the Firefly series.

=== Cortex Plus ===
In 2009, Cortex development was passed to Cam Banks, who refined it into "Cortex Plus" by introducing its roll-and-keep system and streamlining all ranked stats to use die sizes that could be rolled in various conflicts. Cortex Plus saw its debut in 2010 with Smallville Roleplaying Game and Leverage: The Roleplaying Game. Both games were developed concurrently, with design notes passed between writing teams, but each game featured unique variations on the basic Plus engine.

The next round of development saw Banks create Marvel Heroic Roleplaying, published in 2012. This game focused on fights and action scenes. The core game was originally slated to be followed by a long series of supplements, each focusing on a different period of Marvel's fictional history. In 2013, Margaret Weis Productions announced that it would not be renewing its Marvel license, and the game went out of print.

The Cortex Plus Hackers Guide, a compilation of many different 'hacks' of Cortex Plus, was initiated in January 2013. Without the licenses for the three existing games, the Hacker's Guide presented three 'flavors' of Cortex Plus: drama, action, and heroic. Monica Valentinelli then developed the 2014 Firefly Role-Playing Game, published in 2014. This utilized a variant of the Leverage rule set.

=== Cortex Prime ===
On November 1, 2016, Margaret Weis Productions released a statement announcing that Cam Banks and his new design studio Magic Vacuum had licensed the Cortex system and would be "taking over the design, development, and publishing of games based on these rules... for 2017 and beyond," coinciding with "Margaret’s retirement from RPG development to focus on her current novel and film projects."

Banks then set out to normalize the four games of the Cortex Plus era as well as the preceding four Classic games into a single, unified system. This iteration, Cortex Prime, was funded via Kickstarter in April 2017. Prime discards the drama, action, and heroic flavors of Plus and instead offers a modular system that can be custom-built for vastly different play experiences. As part of the Kickstarter stretch goals, five volumes of "spotlight" mini settings by 22 authors, were also planned and funded.

In September 2019, Fandom Tabletop acquired the rights to Cortex from MWP and hired Cam Banks as their new Cortex Creative Director. Fandom published the Cortex Game Handbook in 2020. Fandom planned to publish the five volumes of spotlights, as well as two licensed game settings: Tales of Xadia: The Dragon Prince Roleplaying Game based on The Dragon Prince television show, and Legends of Grayskull: The Masters of the Universe Roleplaying Game based on The Masters of the Universe franchise. Tales of Xadia was published on March 29, 2022, but Legends of Grayskull was canceled after Cortex was sold by Fandom to Dire Wolf Digital in August 2022. Dire Wolf Digital has stated their intent to still publish the spotlights, but they remain available only to backers of the 2017 Kickstarter campaign as of August 2024.

In May of 2026, the core rulebook and 4 of the Spotlight volumes were uploaded to Drivethru RPG due to a new licensing agreement between Cam Banks and Dire Wolf Digital.

Cortex Prime won the 2021 Silver ENNIE Award for "Best Rules." It was also nominated in 2021 for ENNIE Awards for "Best Game," "Best Art: Cover," "Best Art: Interior," "Best Layout and Design," and "Product of the Year."
