= Margaret Weis Productions =

US Games publisher

Margaret Weis Productions, Ltd.
- Headquarters: Williams Bay, Wisconsin, United States
- Website: www.margaretweis.com

Margaret Weis Productions, Ltd. is a games publisher located in Williams Bay, Wisconsin, United States and founded in 2004 after Margaret Weis and Don Perrin, the two founders of Sovereign Press, divorced.

== Games ==
Margaret Weis Productions is principally a producer of tabletop role-playing games, although it also publishes some e-books by Margaret Weis and in 2008 published the Dragon Lairds boardgame, created by James M. Ward and Tom Wham. To date almost all their role-playing games have been licensed games using either the Cortex System or Cortex Plus.

In 2006, it took over production of Dragonlance d20 supplements from Sovereign Press. Both companies are run by many of the same people, and both are owned by Margaret Weis.

=== Cortex System games ===
MWP's first game was the Serenity in late 2005 to coincide with the release of Joss Whedon's feature film Serenity. Due to licensing issues they couldn't use any of the characters that appeared exclusively in the television series Firefly. The company received a Gamer's Choice Best Roleplaying Game of the Year Origins Award and the Gold Medal in the Best Production Values of the 2006 ENnie Awards for this game. Two Serenity supplements have won Origins Awards for Best Roleplaying Game Supplement: Serenity Adventures, in 2009, and Big Damn Heroes Handbook, in 2010.

In 2007 Margaret Weis Productions published the Battlestar Galactica role playing game, following it with Demon Hunters in 2008 and Supernatural Role Playing Game in 2009.

=== Cortex Plus games ===
In 2010 Margaret Weis Productions published the Smallville Roleplaying Game using the new Cortex Plus system, which won the Judges Spotlight award at the 2011 Ennies. This was followed in 2011 with the Leverage: The Roleplaying Game RPG, nominated for the 2011 Origins Award for best RPG.

In February 2012, Margaret Weis Productions launched Marvel Heroic Roleplaying, the fourth licensed role playing game in the Marvel. Marvel Heroic Roleplaying went on to win the 2012 ENnie Award for Best Rules, and the silver awards for Best Game and Product of the Year. In 2013 the basic set won the Origins Award for the Best Roleplaying Game and the Civil War Event Book won Best Roleplaying Supplement. In April 2012, they announced that for economic reasons they would not be renewing the license.

On November 8, 2013, Margaret Weis Productions announced that a new Firefly RPG would be available for pre-order, having previously launched a playtest version at Gen Con 2013. This will use a different system from the previous Serenity RPG. It also suffers a mirror of the Serenity license in that it only licenses characters that appeared in the Firefly TV series

On November 1, 2016, Margaret Weis Productions released a statement announcing that Cam Banks and his new design studio Magic Vacuum had licensed the original Cortex System and Cortex Plus system and would be "taking over the design, development, and publishing of games based on these rules... for 2017 and beyond," coinciding with "Margaret’s retirement from RPG development to focus on her current novel and film projects." After a successful Kickstarter campaign which raised $84,430 for a new edition of Cortex, to be called 'Cortex Prime,' on May 29, 2017, it was announced on September 19, 2019, that Fandom had purchased the rights to the Cortex system from Margaret Weis publications and would be fulfilling all pledges from the crowdfunding effort.

== List of games ==
- Serenity Role Playing Game (2005)
- Battlestar Galactica Role Playing Game (2007)
- Cortex System Role Playing Game (2008)
- Demon Hunters Role Playing Game (2008, based on the films Demon Hunters and Demon Hunters: Dead Camper Lake by Dead Gentlemen Productions)
- Dragon Lairds (2008, a board game)
- Supernatural Role Playing Game (2009)
- Leverage: The Roleplaying Game (2010)
- Smallville Roleplaying Game (2010)
- Marvel Heroic Roleplaying (2012)
- Firefly Role-Playing Game (2014)
