= Cortex Plus =

Role-playing game system

Cortex System
- Designers: Cam Banks
- Publishers: Margaret Weis Productions
- Publication: 2010
- Genres: Role-playing game

The Cortex Plus System is a toolkit RPG system that evolved from Margaret Weis Productions, Ltd's Cortex System. The system was the basis for the Firefly, Marvel, and Battlestar Galactica tabletop role playing games. Cortex was sold to Fandom in 2019.

== System ==
Unlike the Cortex System, Cortex Plus is a roll and keep system in which you roll one die from each category and keep the two highest dice in your dice pool.

The Cortex Plus system has been used for four published games and one published preview to date, and the design principles are in the Cortex Plus Hacker's Guide, a book of advice in how to create new games using Cortex Plus, and list of new games produced via Kickstarter.

Of the four games published using this system, Leverage: The Roleplaying Game was nominated for the 2011 Origins Award for best Role Playing Game, and Marvel Heroic Roleplaying won the 2013 award and the award for best support as well as the 2012 ENnie Award for Best Rules and runner up for Best Game.

== Published games using Cortex Plus ==
- Smallville Roleplaying Game
- Leverage: The Roleplaying Game
- Marvel Heroic Roleplaying
- Dragon Brigade Roleplaying Game
- Firefly Role-Playing Game

== Reception ==
Reception to Cortex Plus games has been good, with Marvel Heroic Roleplaying winning best rules at the 2012 ENnie Awards. A common theme in reviews is that there are no procedural elements, and you are instead rolling based on what you consider relevant to the situation and the way that 1s add narrative complications to the results that would not normally be expected in other role-playing games. Another theme picked up on in the system is the way that it allows balance between characters such as Wolverine and Captain America while having enough meat to distinguish them.
