= Backstab (magazine) =

French game magazine

- Cover of Issue #1
- Editor: Julien Blondel (current)
- Former editors: Benoît "Ben" Clerc; Christophe "Croc" Réaux; Julien Blondel; Patrick Renault; Cyril Pasteau
- Categories: Game magazine
- Frequency: Bimonthly
- Publisher: FC Publications (1996–2005)
- First issue: Autumn 1996 (issue 0); 1997 (Issue 1)
- Final issue: April–May 2005 (Issue 51)
- Country: France
- Based in: Pantin, later Paris
- Language: French

Backstab, a French magazine devoted to games, was published from 1996 to 2005 by FC Publications.

== Description ==
Backstab was dedicated to teen and adult-oriented games of all types: tabletop role-playing games, board games, wargames and collectible card games. The magazine tried to distinguish itself from its older rival Casus Belli by taking less neutral editorial viewpoints, and by using a lighter and irreverent tone. It also covered video games, something that Casus Belli refused to do.

== Publication history ==
Backstab began life as a French translation of the British RPG magazine Arcane, published by Future plc, with a number of additional French-market articles added. The magazine started as a soft roll-out in the autumn of 1996 with an issue 0 that was distributed free of charge in role-playing game shops. In 1997, the magazine debuted as bimonthly periodical, published by FC Publications, a company owned by Asmodee and Halloween Concept, that was based successively in Pantin (24, rue du Pré Saint-Gervais) and Paris (7, rue de Paradis), with Guillaume Gille-Naves as director of publication. Successive editors-in-chief included Ben (Benoît Clerc), Croc, Julien Blondel (author of Prophecy and Vermine), Patrick Renault and Cyril Pasteau.

When Arcane folded in 1997, Backstab continued as an independent magazine. Despite this independence, early issues continued to credit translated material to Future Publishing.

Backstab ceased publication in 2005 after issue No. 51 (April–May 2005).

The sociologist Olivier Caïra compared Backstab to other defunct French role-playing game magazines such as Dragon radieux and Chroniques d'outre-monde, pointing out the high mortality rate of RPG magazines and publishers.

Julien Pirou likewise noted the limited lifespan of such magazines, using as an example Backstab's longtime rival and the leading French game magazine, Casus Belli, which endured several cycles of closure and revival.

== See also ==
- Casus Belli
- Arcane
