= Serenity Role Playing Game =

Tabletop science fiction role-playing game

- Serenity cover
- Designers: Jamie Chambers
- Publishers: Margaret Weis Productions, Ltd
- Publication: 2005
- Genres: Science fiction
- Systems: Cortex System

Serenity Role Playing Game is a science fiction tabletop role-playing game released in 2005 and set in the universe of the movie Serenity and the television series Firefly. It was produced by Margaret Weis Productions, Ltd, and its mechanics were the first iteration of the Cortex System. It won an Origins Award for Best RPG in 2005. Margaret Weis's license came to an end on January 31, 2011.

In February 2013, Margaret Weis Productions announced they now had a license to produce a game based on the Firefly TV series, this time with the rights to the characters who appeared in the series rather than those who appeared in the film. At Gencon 2013, a preview of the system entitled Gaming in the 'Verse was offered for sale both at GenCon and for a limited time as a PDF. In 2014, the Firefly Role-Playing Game was released, followed by four game supplements in 2014 and 2015.

== Contents ==
The book was published in full colour, and includes character attributes as well as biographies written in the words of Mal, the protagonist of the Firefly franchise. Each chapter opens with a narrative to characterize the tone and mood of the setting. These narratives alternate between a crew created by MWP and the crew of Serenity. All of the photographs in the book are sampled from the film Serenity as opposed to the show Firefly. This is due to MWP acquiring their rights from Universal Studios rather than 20th Century Fox. Thus, the previously mentioned narrative text may seem similar to something that happened in an episode of Firefly but will diverge in some way to stay within the license purchased through Universal.

The first chapter introduces the character and setting, giving a brief history of The Verse and the basic concepts of play. The next few chapters deal with character creation as well as details on Attributes, Skills, and Traits. Following the character creation chapters, there are chapters pertaining to more detailed play systems, additional setting information, equipment, how to run the game, and samples of crews and ships as well as attributes for secondary characters in the film. At the end of the book, there is an appendix for common Chinese phrases that are used in the world of the Firefly, giving players the option to use these phrases during the course of the game.

=== Related products ===
Out in the Black by Laura and Tracy Hickman, the system's first adventure, was released on March 15, 2006. Margaret Weis Productions, Ltd has also released a gamemaster's screen as well as specialty d2 dice for sale on their website. Two more books were released for the Serenity RPG in 2008 (Serenity Adventures, a collection of short adventures and winner of the 2008 Origins Award, and Six Shooters and Spaceships, a ship and technology sourcebook) with a third the following year titled Big Damn Heroes Handbook, a rule expansion that won the 2009 Origins Award for Best Supplement. The first installment of the Echoes of War series for the Firefly RPG, The Wedding Planners Cortex Classic Set, was also released under the rules for the Serenity RPG.

In the run-up to the release of the Firefly Role-Playing Game, MWP produced four more books in the Echoes of War series of adventures—Gaming in the 'Verse (preview released at GenCon 2013), Echoes of War: The Serenity Crew (containing stats for the various members of the Serenity and quickstart rules), Echoes of War: The Wedding Planners, Echoes of War: Shooting Fish, and Echoes of War: Friends in Low Places

== System ==
The Serenity Role Playing Game was the first game to be produced under the Cortex System. It is a rules-light generic roll-over system using polyhedral dice. Each of a character's attributes and skills is assigned one of these dice types, with larger dice representing greater ability. When a character attempts an action, such as piloting a spacecraft, shooting a gun, or punching someone, the player rolls the die for the character's applicable attribute and the die for their appropriate skill.

== Reception ==
Serenity won the 2005 Origins Award for the Gamer's Choice Best Role Playing Game of the Year.

Serenity won the 2006 Gold Ennie Award for "Best Production Values".

== Reviews ==
- Pyramid
- Rebel Times #9
- Realms of Fantasy
