= Marvel Heroic Roleplaying =

Role-playing game

- Designers: Cam Banks; Rob Donoghue
- Publishers: Margaret Weis Productions
- Publication: 2012
- Genres: Superhero fiction
- Systems: Cortex Plus

Marvel Heroic Roleplaying (abbreviated as MHR or MHRP) is the fourth role-playing game set in the Marvel Universe published by Margaret Weis Productions under license from Marvel Comics (after Marvel Super Heroes RPG, Marvel Super Heroes Adventure Game, and the Marvel Universe Roleplaying Game). It uses the Cortex Plus system. The first volume was published in early 2012. In early 2013, Margaret Weis Productions announced that they would not be renewing their license and publication ceased.

== Gameplay ==
The game was designed to be fast playing and easy to use and run and very flexible, and designed explicitly for Troupe Play in which the players are expected to pick up new characters between action scenes (or occasionally within them). It has also been described as "a "comic book story" roleplaying game, not a "superhero" game as is common with many other games of this type". Unusually for a role playing game, players are expected to know the capabilities of their characters and their stats do not explicitly restrict what they can do, merely resolving what happens when a player acts.

=== Setting ===
Marvel Heroic Roleplaying is set in the Marvel Universe. In particular, the line was intended to be "event driven", with each major book in the line dealing with a separate famous story arc of the Marvel Universe and allowing players to reshape it. The initial Basic Set contains an adventure that reproduces the opening "Breakout" arc of the New Avengers, and two other major events were released—Civil War as a hardback, and Annihilation in PDF only. A third event planned to be the Age of Apocalypse was never released. Each "Event Book" was available in a Premium Edition which included the rules as well as the event as well as an Essentials Edition, which assumed you also owned the rules and didn't need them in this book.

=== System ===
Marvel Heroic Roleplaying is one of the examples of the Cortex Plus system, and, like most games in that system, it uses a Roll-and-Keep method, with each die representing something that would be notable in the setting and story that is being told.

In order to affect the game above the normal limits, the players get Plot Points, and the GM (known as The Watcher) gets the Doom Pool. Every time any die rolls a 1, that is called an Opportunity, and, if a player rolls a 1, the Watcher may either add a d6 to the Doom Pool or step up a die (and may do this multiple times on multiple 1s in the pool).

Dice dependent on the PC that may be included are:

- One Distinction either as a d8 or a d4 keeping a plot point.
- One Affiliation (Solo/Buddy/Team): who the character is with. Some people work better on their own, and some in teams. PCs have one at d10, one at d8, and one at d6.
- Power Sets (which may be heavily modified by Sfx or limits). One die per power set by default.
- One Specialty: a mix of skills, knowledge, and contacts. Experts are rated d8, and Masters d10. Specialties are Acrobatics, Combat, Covert, Medical, Menace, Mystic, Psych, Science, Tech, and Vehicle. Most characters hold no ranks in most specialties. A d10 specialty may be replaced by 2d8 or 3d6 and a d8 specialty may be replaced by 2d6

Dice dependent on the prior actions that may be included are:

- One asset: an object or situational advantage created within the scene
- One resource: a pre-planned advantage created in a transition scene, and one step smaller than the speciality that created it.
- One die from Stress (i.e. Harm) or a complication (i.e. a temporary impediment) affecting your opponent

=== Plot Points ===
The player characters can use Plot Points for several purposes.

- To power their abilities as listed under their Sfx in their power sets
- To add an extra dice to the dice pool
- To keep an extra dice—either to their result total or as an extra effect dice.
- To change a form of incoming stress from one type to another.

=== The Doom Pool ===
As a rule the Doom Pool can be used to do anything a plot point can other than change a type of stress but the dice affected must be of equal or lower size to the dice spent out of the Doom Pool. There are also two additional functions.

- To activate reinforcements
- 2d12 may be spent from the Doom Pool to immediately end a scene.

== Reception ==
Reception of Marvel Heroic Roleplaying was mixed, with significant critical acclaim including winning both Origins Awards for 2013, but criticisms being made of the free-form nature of the gameplay, the layout, and the lack of character creation rules. Margaret Weis Productions subsequently produced and gave away a random character generator as well as including it in the Premium Edition of all the event books. Other reviews were more positive with io9 declaring "Quibbles aside, the Marvel RPG license couldn't be in better hands. With an innovative, flexible system that gives players tons of room for fun superpowered shenanigans and the promise of a lot of support from Margaret Weis Productions for at least the next year, Marvel Heroic Roleplaying earns its place alongside Green Ronin's DC Adventures RPG (and the Marvel RPGs of yesteryear, if you're lucky enough to own a copy)." and SFSignal saying "Given that, though, especially with its milestone system to encourage players to emulate superheroes, the game captures what it means to be a superhero, and these superheroes in particular. The Thing gets experience for being moody. Emma Frost's history in the Hellfire Club and as a teacher both can come into play. Colossus' capacity for self-sacrifice is rewarded as well."

=== Awards ===
- 2012 ENnie Awards - Best Rules Gold Award: Marvel Heroic Roleplaying Basic Game
- 2012 ENnie Awards - Best Game Silver Award: Marvel Heroic Roleplaying Basic Game
- 2012 ENnie Awards - Product of the Year Silver Award: Marvel Heroic Roleplaying Basic Game
- 2013 Origins Awards - Best Roleplaying Game: Marvel Heroic RPG Basic
- 2013 Origins Awards: Best Roleplaying Supplement or Adventure: Marvel Heroic Roleplaying Civil War Essentials Edition Event Book

== End of license ==
Margaret Weis Productions announced on April 24, 2013 that they would no longer produce content for the Marvel Heroic Roleplaying Game. "...And in Marvel news… the economics of licensing a tie-in product is always something we have to weigh carefully. We brokered an admittedly ambitious license with Marvel. Our first event, CIVIL WAR, was successful and well received, but it didn't garner the level of sales necessary to sustain the rest of the line. We've learned from this and are taking a very different approach with the other licensed properties we're bringing out to you in the next three years. We believe we created a great game. Those of you that have supported us have been terrific, and we appreciate you. But, unfortunately, we will not be bringing any new product out under the Marvel line..."
