= The Essential Fantasy Earth =

Tabletop fantasy role-playing game supplement

- Designers: Michael Zody
- Publishers: Zody Games
- Publication: 1996; 30 years ago
- Genres: Fantasy
- ISBN: 978-1886359048

The Essential Fantasy Earth is a supplement published by Zody Games in 1996 for the fantasy role-playing game Fantasy Earth.

== Publication history ==
The Essential Fantasy Earth, by Michael Zody, combines, streamlines and simplifies the core rules found in the original Fantasy Earth rulebook and its first supplement, The Book of Magic. The material includes spell lists, sample characters and an introductory scenario.

== Reviews ==
In the July 1996 edition of Dragon (Issue #231), Rick Swan called the original rules "a set of sound, thoughtful rules, adaptable to your setting of choice." With The Essential Fantasy Earth, he found that "Even in its streamlined form, the game requires a fair amount of number-crunching, which may discourage the mathematically challenged." But given that the original two rule books cost $30, he liked the low $9 price tag of this new compilation: "at this price, what’ve you got to lose? I mean, you can barely buy dinner for $9."
