= Fantasy Earth: The Book of Magic =

Tabletop fantasy role-playing game supplement

- Cover by Andy Jones
- Designers: Michael Zody
- Publishers: Zody Games
- Publication: 1994; 32 years ago
- Genres: Fantasy

Fantasy Earth: The Book of Magic is a supplement published by Zody Games in 1994 for the role-playing game Fantasy Earth.

== Description ==
Fantasy Earth: The Book of Magic is a 148-page perfect-bound book designed by Michael Zody, with art by Andy Jones. The book describes the simple magic system used in the Fantasy Earth role-playing game. It also details several hundred spells.

In 1996, Zody Games published The Essential Fantasy Earth that included a streamlined version of these rules.

== Reception ==
In the April 1996 edition of Dragon (Issue #228), Rick Swan wondered why any publisher would create a new generic fantasy role-playing game, given the preponderance of Advanced Dungeons & Dragons, but then admitted that "Michael Zody forged ahead anyway, with surprisingly credible results." Swan concluded, "I don’t imagine many folks will be abandoning their AD&D Player's Handbook for Fantasy Earth. But if you’re a supporter of the small press, or if you’re looking for a set of ready-made rules to graft onto a homemade setting, you could do worse than this."

== Reviews ==
- The Familiar (Issue 2, February 1995)
