= Fantasy Earth: Basic Rules =

Tabletop fantasy role-playing game

- Designers: Michael Zody
- Publishers: Zody Games
- Publication: 1994; 32 years ago
- Genres: Fantasy

Fantasy Earth: Basic Rules is a role-playing game published in 1994 by Zody Games.

== Description ==
Fantasy Earth: Basic Rules is a 120-page perfect-bound book that describes the Fantasy Earth role-playing game. It is a generic system — there is no world or universe setting, leaving gamemasters free to create their own world.

In 1996, Zody Games published a streamlined version of the rules, called The Essential Fantasy Earth.

=== Character generation ===
Players assign 10-sided die rolls to 26 attributes such as Strength and Appearance. Over 120 skills are derived from the attributes. The player then chooses a class: Warrior, Sorcerer, Cleric, Shaman or Burglar. The only race available is human.

=== Skill resolution ===
To resolve a skill, the gamemaster sets a success level for the task, which the player must then equal or exceed with a die roll added to the character's relevant skill level.

=== Combat ===
The combat system uses maneuvers and hit locations to allocate damage that can range from superficial to extreme.

== Reception ==
In the April 1996 edition of Dragon (Issue #228), Rick Swan wondered why any publisher would create a new generic fantasy role-playing game, given the preponderance of Advanced Dungeons & Dragons, but then admitted that "Michael Zody forged ahead anyway, with surprisingly credible results." Swan found the combat system "number-heavy but manageable." He concluded, "I don’t imagine many folks will be abandoning their AD&D Player's Handbook for Fantasy Earth. But if you’re a supporter of the small press, or if you’re looking for a set of ready-made rules to graft onto a homemade setting, you could do worse than this."

== Reviews ==
- The Familiar (Issue 2, February 1995)

== See also ==
- Fantasy Earth: The Book of Magic - The Fantasy Earth magic supplement
