= Timeline of tabletop role-playing games =

The following is a timeline of tabletop role-playing games. For computer role-playing games see here.

The publication year listed here is the year of the first edition in the original country. Additional editions, translations or adaptations for use in other countries are not included in this list. For editions other than the first, consult the corresponding article.

Some games started out as generic role-playing supplements, supplements for other games, or even a different kind of game. Those games are listed in the year when they made the transition to a standalone role-playing game.

Unique games with identical or similar titles are listed separately. Unique means games that use different rules or settings but does not include rule revisions by the same author or publisher.

== 1970s ==
=== 1974 ===
- Dungeons & Dragons
- Rules to the Game of DUNGEON

=== 1975 ===
- Boot Hill
- Empire of the Petal Throne
- En Garde!
- Tunnels & Trolls

=== 1976 ===
- Bunnies & Burrows
- Knights of the Round Table
- Metamorphosis Alpha
- Monsters! Monsters!
- Starfaring

=== 1977 ===
- Arduin
- Chivalry & Sorcery
- Flash Gordon & the Warriors of Mongo
- The Realm of Yolmi
- Space Patrol, later renamed Star Patrol
- Space Quest
- Superhero: 2044
- Traveller

=== 1978 ===
- Advanced Dungeons & Dragons
- Bifrost
- The Complete Warlock
- Gamma World
- High Fantasy
- John Carter, Warlord of Mars
- Legacy
- PrinceCon System
- RuneQuest
- Starships & Spacemen
- Star Trek: Adventure Gaming in the Final Frontier
- What Price Glory?!

=== 1979 ===
- Adventures in Fantasy
- Buccaneer
- Bushido
- Commando
- Gangster!
- Heroes
- Ironhedge
- Villains and Vigilantes
- Ysgarth

== 1980s ==
=== 1980 ===
- Archaeron
- Basic Role-Playing
- Beasts, Men & Gods
- The Castle Perilous
- Dallas
- DragonQuest
- The Fantasy Trip
- Land of the Rising Sun
- Melanda
- The Morrow Project
- Odysseus
- Skull and Crossbones
- Space Opera
- Supergame
- Thieves' Guild
- Top Secret

=== 1981 ===
- Aftermath!
- Call of Cthulhu
- Champions
- Crimefighters
- Fantasy Wargaming
- Heroes of Olympus
- The Mechanoid Invasion
- Merc
- Midgard (German RPG)
- The Spawn of Fashan
- Star Rovers
- Stormbringer
- Universe
- Wild West
- Wizards' Realm

=== 1982 ===
- Alma Mater
- Behind Enemy Lines by FASA
- Daredevils
- Drakar och Demoner (Dragonbane)
- Fringeworthy
- FTL:2448
- Gangbusters
- Inner City
- Knights and Berserkers and Legerdemain
- Man, Myth and Magic
- Pirates and Plunder
- Recon
- Rolemaster
- Space Infantry
- Starfleet Voyages
- Star Frontiers
- Star Trek: The Role Playing Game
- Swordbearer
- Worlds of Wonder

=== 1983 ===
- Droids
- Element Masters
- Espionage!, later renamed Danger International
- James Bond 007
- Lands of Adventure
- Légendes (French RPG)
- Lords of Creation
- L'Ultime Epreuve (French RPG)
- Mach: The First Colony
- Mercenaries, Spies and Private Eyes
- Other Suns by FGU
- Palladium Fantasy Role-Playing Game
- Powers & Perils
- Privateers and Gentlemen
- Stalking the Night Fantastic
- Star Quest
- Super Squadron
- Superworld
- Timeship
- To Challenge Tomorrow
- The Valley of the Pharaohs
- Victorian Adventure
- Warhammer The Mass Combat Fantasy Role-Playing Game
- Witch Hunt by StatCom Simulations

=== 1984 ===
- The Adventures of Indiana Jones
- The Atlantean Trilogy (also known as The Arcanum)
- Chill
- Das Schwarze Auge (The Dark Eye)
- DragonRaid
- Elfquest
- Fighting Fantasy - The Introductory Role-Playing Game
- Flashing Blades
- Golden Heroes
- Heroes Unlimited
- Justice, Inc.
- Kata Kumbas
- Maelstrom
- Marvel Super Heroes
- Mega (French RPG)
- Middle-earth Role Playing
- Mutant
- Paranoia
- Phantasy Conclave
- Psi World
- Ringworld
- Skyrealms of Jorune
- Star Ace
- Swords & Glory
- Time & Time Again
- Time Master
- Toon
- Twilight: 2000

=== 1985 ===
- Challengers
- Conan Role-Playing Game
- DC Heroes
- Dinky Dungeons
- The Doctor Who Role Playing Game
- Dragon Warriors
- Dragonroar
- Fantasy Hero
- Hawkmoon
- Hidden Kingdom
- Judge Dredd: The Role-Playing Game
- Maléfices
- Mekton
- Midnight at the Well of Souls Role-Playing System
- Pendragon
- Sandman - Map of Halaal
- Space Master
- Teenage Mutant Ninja Turtles & Other Strangeness

=== 1986 ===
- 2300 AD
- 9th Generation
- Arena
- By the Gods
- The Challenges Game System
- Delta Force: America Strikes Back!
- Eternal Soldier
- Ghostbusters
- Freedom Fighters
- GURPS
- HârnMaster
- Hunter Planet: The All Australian Role Playing Game
- MechWarrior
- Mythworld
- Phoenix Command
- The Price of Freedom
- Robotech
- Robot Warriors
- Warhammer Fantasy Roleplay
- Year of the Phoenix

=== 1987 ===
- Ars Magica
- Beyond the Supernatural
- Cyborg Commando
- Enforcers
- Expendables
- Future Worlds
- Living Steel
- MEGA Role-Playing System
- Miekka ja magia
- Night of the Ninja
- Ninjas & Superspies
- Star Wars: The Roleplaying Game by West End Games
- Talislanta
- Teenagers from Outer Space
- Robotech II: The Sentinels
- TimeLords
- TWERPS

=== 1988 ===
- Animonde
- Albedo
- Bullwinkle and Rocky Role-Playing Party Game
- Cyberpunk 2013
- High Colonies
- Justifiers RPG
- Macho Women with Guns
- Manhunter
- Phantasia
- Second Dawn
- Space: 1889
- SpaceTime
- Woof Meow

=== 1989 ===
- Advanced Fighting Fantasy
- Adventurers of the North: Kalevala Heroes
- Batman Role-Playing Game
- Blackwatch
- The Confederate Rangers
- Cyberspace
- In Nomine Satanis/Magna Veritas
- It Came From the Late, Late, Late Show
- Lace & Steel
- Mutazoids
- Omnigon
- Prince Valiant: The Story-Telling Game
- Shadowrun
- Star Hero
- Sword World RPG

== 1990s ==
=== 1990 ===
- Age of Ruin by Cutting Edge Games
- Aquelarre (Spanish RPG)
- Attack of the Humans
- Battlelords of the 23rd Century
- Buck Rogers XXVC
- Cadillacs and Dinosaurs
- CORPS
- Fifth Cycle
- Hero System
- Morpheus
- Nightlife
- Reich Star
- Rifts
- Ruf des Warlock (German RPG)
- Torg
- Worlds Beyond

=== 1991 ===
- Amber Diceless Roleplaying Game
- Aliens Adventure Game
- Dark Conspiracy
- Kult
- Lord of the Rings Adventure Game
- Lost Souls
- Millennium's End
- Tales from the Floating Vagabond
- Time Lord: Adventures through Time and Space
- Vampire: The Masquerade
- Warp World
- The World of Synnibarr

=== 1992 ===
- Dangerous Journeys
- Dream Park: The Roleplaying Game
- Duel by Nightshift Games
- Fanhunter, el juego de rol épicodecadente
- Fudge
- Fuzzy Heroes by Inner City Games Designs
- Nephilim
- Over the Edge
- Werewolf: The Apocalypse

=== 1993 ===
- Amazing Engine
- The Beast Within
- Earthdawn
- Fate of the Norns
- Forgotten Futures
- High Adventure Cliffhangers Buck Rogers Adventure Game
- Kryształy Czasu
- Macross II: The Role-Playing Game
- Mage: The Ascension
- Manhunter
- Mutant Chronicles
- Nexus: The Infinite City
- Pandemonium!
- Prime Directive
- Risus
- Shatterzone
- SLA Industries
- Space Gothic (German RPG)
- Theatrix
- Underground
- The Whispering Vault

=== 1994 ===
- 3D&T
- Aria: Canticle of the Monomyth
- Castle Falkenstein
- Don't Look Back
- Gardásiyal: Adventures on Tékumel
- GateWar by Escape Ventures
- HoL
- Immortal: The Invisible War
- Inferno by Death's Edge Games
- Masterbook
- STOCS lite by Wasteland Games and its 1996 supplement Heretics: Welcome to the Asylum
- Street Fighter: The Storytelling Game
- The World of Bloodshadows
- The World of Indiana Jones
- Wraith: The Oblivion

=== 1995 ===
- Changeling: The Dreaming
- Cybergeneration
- The End by Scapegoat Games
- Everway
- Heavy Gear
- Nightbane
- Project A-ko
- The World of Necroscope
- The World of Tank Girl

=== 1996 ===
- Blood Dawn
- Bubblegum Crisis
- CJ Carella's WitchCraft
- Conspiracy X
- The D6 System: The Customizable Roleplaying Game
- Deadlands
- Dragonlance: Fifth Age
- Fading Suns
- Feng Shui
- Gatecrasher
- Hong Kong Action Theatre!
- Infinite Domains by Infinite Concepts
- Fritz Leiber's Lankhmar: The New Adventures of Fafhrd and Gray Mouser
- Vampire: The Dark Ages
- The World of Tales from the Crypt

=== 1997 ===
- Æon/Trinity
- Armageddon: The End Times
- Armored Trooper VOTOMS
- Big Eyes, Small Mouth
- Blue Planet
- Champions: New Millennium
- Dzikie Pola (Polish RPG)
- Fuzion
- In Nomine
- Jovian Chronicles
- Legend of the Five Rings
- Men in Black
- Multiverser
- Neverwhere by Postmortem Studios
- Puppetland
- Usagi Yojimbo Roleplaying Game
- Werewolf: The Wild West

=== 1998 ===
- Alternity
- Blood of Heroes
- Deadlands: Hell on Earth
- The Extraordinary Adventures of Baron Munchausen
- Hercules & Xena
- Mage: The Sorcerers Crusade
- Marvel Super Heroes Adventure Game
- QAGS
- RuneSlayers
- Star Trek: The Next Generation Role-playing Game
- Tribe 8
- Tribes by Steve Jackson Games
- Unknown Armies

=== 1999 ===
- 7th Sea
- Aberrant
- Agone (French RPG)
- All Flesh Must Be Eaten
- Brave New World
- Continuum
- DC Universe Roleplaying Game
- Dominion Rules (online)
- Dragon Ball Z: The Anime Adventure Game
- Furry Pirates
- Hunter: The Reckoning
- Lejendary Adventure
- Nobilis
- Powerkill
- Star Trek: Deep Space Nine Role Playing Game
- Star Trek: The Original Series Role-playing Game
- Violence
- Weird War Two: Crusade for Europe

== 2000s ==
=== 2000 ===
- Age of Heroes by Brian Gleichman
- Dune: Chronicles of the Imperium
- Hero Wars (later renamed HeroQuest)
- Orkworld
- Star Wars Roleplaying Game by Wizards of the Coast
- World Tree

=== 2001 ===
- Action! System
- Adventure!
- After the Bomb
- De Profundis
- The Dying Earth Roleplaying Game
- Exalted
- Forbidden Kingdoms
- Gear Krieg
- Godlike
- HackMaster
- Little Fears
- The Metabarons Roleplaying Game
- Mummy: The Resurrection
- Sorcerer
- Weird War II: Blood on the Rhine
- The Wheel of Time Roleplaying Game
- The Witcher (Polish RPG)

=== 2002 ===
- Active Exploits
- Arcane Codex (German RPG)
- Buffy the Vampire Slayer Roleplaying Game
- The Burning Wheel
- Call of Cthulhu (d20)
- Cartoon Action Hour
- Children of the Sun
- d20 Modern
- Demon: The Fallen
- Engel
- Discworld Roleplaying Game
- Donjon
- Dread: The First Book of Pandemonium
- EverQuest Role-Playing Game
- Farscape Roleplaying Game
- InSpectres
- The Lord of the Rings Roleplaying Game
- Mechanical Dream
- Mutants & Masterminds
- Silver Age Sentinels
- Sláine: The Roleplaying Game of Celtic Heroes
- Spaceship Zero
- Spycraft
- Star Trek Roleplaying Game
- Terra Primate
- Steve Perrin's Quest Rules
- Transhuman Space
- Victorian Age: Vampire

=== 2003 ===
- Angel Roleplaying Game
- Babylon 5 Roleplaying Game
- D6 Adventure
- Dead Inside
- Deliria
- Diana: Warrior Princess
- EABA
- F.A.T.A.L.
- FATE
- Fates Worse than Death
- Grimm
- High Adventure Role Playing
- Marvel Universe Roleplaying Game
- My Life with Master
- Neuroshima
- Orpheus
- Savage Worlds
- Silhouette CORE
- Sine Requie
- Stargate SG-1 Roleplaying Game
- Tri-Stat dX
- Unisystem
- Victoriana

=== 2004 ===
- Castles & Crusades
- Chronicles of Darkness
- Conan: The Roleplaying Game
- Dogs in the Vineyard
- D6 Fantasy
- D6 Space
- Fireborn
- Lone Wolf: The Roleplaying Game
- Monastyr
- Paranoia XP
- Primetime Adventures
- The Shadow of Yesterday
- Tibet: The Roleplaying Game
- Vampire: The Requiem

=== 2005 ===
- A+ Fantasy
- Anima: Beyond Fantasy (Spanish RPG)
- Army of Darkness
- Artesia: Adventures in the Known World
- Atlantis: The Second Age
- Blue Rose
- Capes
- City of Heroes by Eden Games
- Dawning Star
- Dread
- Etherscope
- A Game of Thrones
- Hollyworld
- Jeremiah: The Roleplaying Game
- Mage: The Awakening
- The Mountain Witch
- Omni System
- Serenity
- Spycraft 2.0
- Starship Troopers: The Roleplaying Game
- Tékumel: Empire of the Petal Throne
- True20
- Truth & Justice
- Usagi Yojimbo by Sanguine Productions
- Werewolf: The Forsaken
- World of Warcraft: The Roleplaying Game

=== 2006 ===
- Basic Fantasy RPG
- Big Bang Comics RPG
- Cadwallon
- The Chronicles of Ramlar
- Corporation
- Cold City
- Crystalicum
- Don't Rest Your Head
- Heroic Visions
- Hollow Earth Expedition
- Lacuna
- Mortal Coil
- Nemesis - Roleplaying in Worlds of Horror by Arc Dream Publishing
- OSRIC
- Promethean: The Created
- The Shab-al-Hiri Roach
- Spirit of the Century
- Wild Talents
- The Zantabulous Zorcerer of Zo

=== 2007 ===
- Aces & Eights: Shattered Frontier
- Battlestar Galactica Role Playing Game
- Changeling: The Lost
- The Esoterrorists
- Fear Itself
- Grey Ranks
- Labyrinth Lord
- Monte Cook's World of Darkness
- Reign
- Scion
- Star Wars Saga Edition
- Tenra War
- Witch Hunter: The Invisible World

=== 2008 ===
- CthulhuTech
- Dark Heresy
- Dead Reign
- Demon Hunters Role Playing Game
- Ghosts of Albion by Eden Studios, Inc.
- Houses of the Blooded
- Hunter: The Vigil
- Innocents
- Hot War
- Legend of the Burning Sands
- Monsters and Other Childish Things
- Mouse Guard Roleplaying Game
- Mutant Future
- Starblazer Adventures
- Swords & Wizardry
- Trail of Cthulhu

=== 2009 ===
- A Song of Ice and Fire Roleplaying
- Diaspora
- Doctor Who: Adventures in Time and Space
- Eclipse Phase
- Fantasy Craft
- Fiasco
- Geist: The Sin-Eaters
- Lady Blackbird
- Mutant City Blues
- Pathfinder Roleplaying Game
- Rogue Trader
- Supernatural Role Playing Game

== 2010s ==
=== 2010 ===
- Apocalypse World
- Capes, Cowls & Villains Foul
- Dark Dungeons
- Dark Harvest - The Legacy of Frankenstein
- DC Adventures
- Deathwatch
- Dragon Age
- The Dresden Files
- Eden: l'Inganno (Italian RPG)
- Lamentations of the Flame Princess
- The Laundry
- Legends of Anglerre
- Leverage: The Roleplaying Game
- Smallville Roleplaying Game
- Stars Without Number

=== 2011 ===
- Abney Park's Airship Pirates
- Arcanis
- Ashen Stars
- Black Crusade
- Fabled Lands
- Microscope
- The Kerberos Club (Fate)
- The One Ring Roleplaying Game

=== 2012 ===
- Dog Eat Dog
- Dungeon Crawl Classics
- Dungeon World
- Ehdrigohr
- Iron Kingdoms
- Marvel Heroic Roleplaying
- Michtim: Fluffy Adventures
- Monster of the Week
- Night's Black Agents
- Only War
- Space: 1889 (Ubiquity)
- Star Wars Roleplaying Game by Fantasy Flight
- Tephra: The Steampunk RPG
- Wolsung (Polish RPG)

=== 2013 ===
- 13th Age
- Blueholme
- Mummy: The Curse
- Numenera

=== 2014 ===
- Atomic Robo
- Demon: The Descent
- Demonworld
- Firefly Role-Playing Game
- Splittermond (German RPG)
- The Strange by Monte Cook Games
- Thunderbirds by Modiphius Entertainment

=== 2015 ===
- Catalyst
- Cornerstone System
- Cypher System by Monte Cook Games
- Night Witches
- Narosia by Legendsmiths
- Mutant: Year Zero by Free League Publishing
- Shadow of the Demon Lord
- Ten Candles
- World Wide Wrestling RPG

=== 2016 ===
- Adventures in Middle-earth
- The Black Hack
- Beast: The Primordial
- Bubblegumshoe
- Classic Fantasy
- Degenesis
- Delta Green
- Masks: A New Generation by Magpie Games
- No Thank You, Evil!
- Ryuutama

=== 2017 ===
- Blades in the Dark
- Bluebeard's Bride by Magpie Games
- City of Mist by Son of Oak Game Studio
- Conan: Adventures in an Age Undreamed Of by Modiphius Entertainment
- Coriolis by Free League Publishing
- Genesys (RPG)
- Honey Heist by Grant Howitt
- Monsterhearts 2
- Paranoia: Red Clearance Edition
- Star Trek Adventures by Modiphius Entertainment
- Starfinder Roleplaying Game
- Tales from the Loop by Free League Publishing
- Vurt
- Zweihänder

=== 2018 ===
- Dead Friend: A Game of Necromancy by Lucian Kahn
- Dream Askew, Dream Apart by Avery Alder and Benjamin Rosenbaum
- Forbidden Lands by Free League Publishing
- Good Society
- Invisible Sun by Monte Cook
- Ironsworn by Shawn Tomkin
- Kids on Bikes by Hunters Entertainment
- John Carter of Mars by Modiphius
- Mothership Sci-Fi Horror RPG by Tuesday Knight Games
- Spire: The City Must Fall by Grant Howitt and Chris Taylor
- Suzerain Legends by Savage Mojo
- Tails of Equestria by River Horse
- Troika!
- The Witcher by R. Talsorian Games

=== 2019 ===
- Alien: The Roleplaying Game by Free League Publishing
- Companions' Tale
- Dialect
- For the Queen
- I'm Sorry Did You Say Street Magic
- Lancer
- Never Going Home by Wet Ink Games
- Quest by The Adventure Guild
- Star Crossed

== 2020s ==
=== 2020 ===
- Alice is Missing
- Apocalypse Keys
- Burn Bryte by Roll20
- Cyberpunk RED by R. Talsorian Games
- Depués d'Ochobre by Ediciones Radagast
- Heart: The City Beneath by Grant Howitt
- Mausritter
- Monster Care Squad
- Mörk Borg by Free League Publishing
- SLA Industries: 2nd Edition by Nightfall Games
- Slayers
- Thousand Year Old Vampire
- Transformers by Renegade Game Studios
- Ultraviolet Grasslands
- Vaesen by Free League Publishing
- Visigoths vs. Mall Goths by Lucian Kahn

=== 2021 ===
- Achtung! Cthulhu by Modiphius
- Apothecaria
- Coyote & Crow
- Fallout: The Roleplaying Game by Modiphius
- Field Guide to Memory by Jeeyon Shim
- Inspirisles
- Jiangshi: Blood in the Banquet Hall by Banana Chan and Sen-Foong Lim
- Shadow of Mogg by Manic Productions
- Thirsty Sword Lesbians by Evil Hat Productions
- Wanderhome

=== 2022 ===
- Avatar Legends: The Roleplaying Game by Magpie Games
- Brindlewood Bay
- Die by Kieron Gillen and Stephanie Hans
- G.I. JOE by Renegade Game Studios
- Rosenstrasse
- Swords of the Serpentine
- Tales of Xadia
- Trophy RPG
- Women are Werewolves

=== 2023 ===
- Blade Runner: The Roleplaying Game by Free League Publishing
- Candela Obscura
- Eat the Reich by Grant Howitt
- Fabula Ultima
- If I Were a Lich, Man by Lucian Kahn
- Koriko: A Magical Year
- Liminal Horror
- Ma Nishtana (game)
- Marvel Multiverse Role-Playing Game
- Power Rangers by Renegade Game Studios
- Shadowdark
- Salvage Union by Leyline Press
- Zin Never Dies

=== 2024 ===
- Cain
- Cosmere Roleplaying Game
- Outgunned
- Queerz! TTRPG
- Triangle Agency

=== 2025 ===
- Daggerheart

== Sources ==
- Darkshire, in English
- RPGGeek, in English
- Le Grog, in French
- PSNROL, in Spanish (archived)
- DRoSI, in German
- Martinolli, Pascal. 2019. « TTTTRPG: Timeline Tree of Tabletop Role-Playing Games, celebrating more than 40 years of game design innovations » Dataset and dot language code.

== See also ==
- History of role-playing games
- List of role-playing games, restricted to notable games.
- List of role-playing game designers, including a short list of games to which each designer made a significant contribution.
- List of role-playing game publishers
- List of game manufacturers
