= Diceless role-playing game =

Role-playing game mechanic

A diceless role-playing game is a tabletop role-playing game (TTRPG) which is not based on chance because it does not use randomizers to determine the outcome of events. The style of game is known as "diceless" because most TTRPGs use dice as a randomizer. However, some games use other randomizers such as playing cards instead of dice, and these are not considered "diceless."

One commentator described the introduction of diceless TTRPGs in 1991:

"They went 'diceless,' creating a rules system where everything was worked out by the Game Master via numerical comparisons and other (non-random) techniques. Amber Diceless (Phage Press) created quite a stir, and the great diceless debate had begun in full force. A debate that, ultimately, the dice fans would apparently win, at least in the marketplace."

== Examples and nonexamples ==
=== Diceless (no randomizers) ===
- Amber Diceless Roleplaying Game uses no randomization, although secret information does create uncertainty for players.
- Active Exploits, a diceless set of role-playing game rules by Precis Intermedia Gaming.
- Chuubo's Marvelous Wish-Granting Engine by Jenna Moran.
- Enclave, featuring agents teleporting anywhere in the multiverse to complete one-shot missions with continuous characters, by Robby Howell.
- Golden Sky Stories, a Japanese non-violent role-playing game, uses resource pools, called Wonder and Feelings, rather than dice.
- Lords of Olympus is inspired by Amber Diceless.
- Microscope and Kingdom are worldbuilding indie role-playing games that use diceless mechanics.
- Nobilis by Jenna Moran.
- Stalker

=== Randomizers without dice ===
- Fate of the Norns is a Viking RPG set during the dark age of Ragnarok. It uses the Futhark rune set to resolve all game mechanics.
- Dread (role-playing game) uses a Jenga tower or similar to determine the success of actions.
- Frankenstein Atomic Frontier, an Australian role-playing game, uses cards with players drawing a quantity equal to their trait, counting Aces, Kings, Queens, Jacks and Jokers as a success.

== Reception ==
Diceless role-playing has been reviewed for both its positive and negative aspects of resolving actions without randomizers. A review of Amber Diceless Role-Playing stated that the simple and flexible system was well received, but that the lack of randomization makes that lower attribute characters are not able to beat higher attribute characters in direct combat on a regular basis. The system is deterministic, according to another RPGnet review, and the Game Master has the most control over actions and gameplay. The conflict between freedom of diceless play and the somewhat restricted mechanical procedures for conflict resolution have also been mentioned in later reviews.
