= Starhedge Manifesto =

Starhedge Manifesto is a 1990 role-playing supplement for Ironhedge published by Empire Wargames.

== Contents ==
Starhedge Manifesto is a supplement in which rules for space adventuring are presented.

== Publication history ==
Starhedge Manifesto was written by John Brooke, and was published by Empire Wargames in 1990 as a small 24-page booklet with a character card.

== Reception ==
Allen Mixson reviewed Starhedge in White Wolf #30 (Feb., 1992), rating it a 3 out of 5 and stated that "Like other Hedgebooks I've reviewed, this one covers descriptions in matter of fact style. The blatant satirical slams found in the Ganghedge and Westhedge booklets are almost totally lacking here."
