= Judicator =

A judicator is someone who acts like a judge.

Judicator may also refer to:

- Judicator (comics), a Marvel character and an Elder of the Universe
- The Judicator caste, a faction of the Protoss race in the fictional Starcraft universe
- A warjack of the Protectorate of Menoth in the fictional Warmachine universe
- A playable class in Mechanical Dream
- Judicator (band), American power metal band
- A fictional weapon in the video game Metroid Prime Hunters

== See also ==
- 1909 Judicator Act, which established the Supreme Court of Thailand
- Adjudicator
