= World Beyond =

World Beyond or Worlds Beyond may refer to:

== Film and television ==
- The World Beyond, 1978 occult detective television pilot
- Worlds Beyond (TV series), 1986–1988 series about supernatural events
- The World Beyond (Super Soul Sunday), 2011 self-help television episode
- Tomorrowland: A World Beyond, 2015 science fiction film
- The Walking Dead: World Beyond, 2020 post-apocalyptic horror drama miniseries

== Games ==
- Worlds Beyond (role-playing game), 1990 science fiction tabletop game
- Shadowverse: Worlds Beyond, 2025 digital collectible card game
- Kirby and the World Beyond, 2027 platformer

== Literature ==
- Of Worlds Beyond, 1947 anthology about science fiction writing
- Worlds Beyond (magazine), 1950–1951 fantasy and science fiction magazine

== Music ==
- World Beyond (album), 2018 album by Erasure
