= Hidden Kingdom =

Hidden Kingdom may refer to:

- Gondolin
- Doriath
- Hidden Kingdoms, a documentary series narrated by Stephen Fry
- Hidden Kingdom (role-playing game), a role-playing game
- Hidden Kingdom, a 1996 album by Rodney Whitaker
