= What Price Glory =

What Price Glory? may refer to:

- What Price Glory (play), a 1924 play by Maxwell Anderson and Laurence Stallings; basis for two films:
  - What Price Glory (1926 film), directed by Raoul Walsh
  - What Price Glory (1952 film), directed by John Ford
- What Price Glory?!, a role-playing game
