= Reactor =

Reactor may refer to:

== Science ==
- Bioreactor, a device which controls a biologically active environment.
- Chemical reactor, a device for containing and controlling a chemical reaction
- Fusion reactor, a device for containing and controlling a fusion power reaction
- An inductor (possessing reactance) in an electrical power grid
  - A current limiting reactor is used to limit starting current of motors and to protect variable frequency drives
- Nuclear reactor, a device for containing and controlling a nuclear reaction
- Breeder reactor
- Reactor (software), a physics simulation engine
- The reactor design pattern, a design pattern used in concurrent programming

== Entertainment ==
- Reactor (magazine), an online science fiction and fantasy magazine, formerly known as Tor.com
- Reactor (album), a 1981 album by Neil Young and Crazy Horse
- Reactor (arcade game), an arcade game created by Gottlieb
- Reactor (Supergame), a 1983 adventure for the role-playing game Supergame
- The Reactor (show rod), a show car built by Gene Winfield
- Reactor, an alternate title for Deadlock, a 2021 American action thriller film starring Bruce Willis
- Reactor, an alternative title for the 1978 Italian film War of the Robots directed by Alfonso Brescia
- Reactor, Inc., a defunct interactive entertainment company founded by Mike Saenz
- Reactor, a comedy series hosted by David Huntsberger on Syfy
