= Fuzzy Sooper Heroes =

Fuzzy Sooper Heroes is a miniatures wargame published by Inner City Games Designs in 1993 that features combat between plush toys and plastic toys.

Cover art by Jonathan Niccum, 1993

== Gameplay ==
Fuzzy Sooper Heroes contains an extension of rules for a miniatures wargame originally found in Fuzzy Heroes, also written by Clark and published by Inner City Designs the previous year. That book set out rules for battles between plush toys — the Fuzzy Heroes — and hard plastic heroes — the Renegade Boy Toys — using components that could be found around the house: 6-sided dice, a ruler or tape measure, terrain made from pillows and clothes, and the plush and plastic toys themselves.

=== Super powers ===
In Fuzzy Sooper Heroes, the toys are given super powers. For a toy to gain super powers, the owner must first create a costume consisting of a mask, a cape, and an emblem of some sort. These can be constructed of whatever materials are at hand. These super powers are identical for all toys:

- Flight
- Increased strength
- Can directly attack buildings and vehicles
- An extra power based on the toy's main color
- A special ability chosen from a list by the player such as fire-breathing or size control. (For size control, the player must own several copies of the same toy in different sizes.)

Other than new rules for super powers, combat uses the same basic rules and advanced optional rules that were set out in Fuzzy Heroes.

== Other content ==
A chivalric code of conduct called W.A.S.H. (Words Attributable to Sooper Heroes) is detailed, to which all super heroes must adhere. Super heroes cannot retreat from combat, must always attack their most powerful opponent first, cannot strike an opponent who is down, and must always look for a way to negotiate a peaceful resolution before combat begins. There are penalties for players who ignore these rules.

Rules are also provided for organizing tournaments, including inclusion of all prospective players, prizes, and the notion that the tournament is "neutral ground". Tournament rules include Jousting, Pugilism and other skill competitions.

A complete adventure, "The Assault on Castle Stuffmore", is also included.

== Publication history ==
Inner City Games Designs originally published the prequel game, Fuzzy Heroes, in 1992. The following year, Inner City published Fuzzy Sooper Heroes, an 80-page perfect-bound softcover book designed by Christopher Clark, with illustrations by Jon Niccum.

== Reception ==
Sean Holland reviewed Fuzzy Sooper Heroes in White Wolf #47 (Sept., 1994), rating it a 4 out of 5 and stated that "Anyone who's familiar with Fuzzy Heroes should be able to jump right in and have Sooper Heroes battling it out against evil Renegades."

In the April 1995 edition of Dragon (Issue #216), Spike Jones believed that the chivalric code "has turned the Fuzzy Heroes game into a role-playing game. Thus, all of the use that could have been made of the original game to introduce children to the miniatures war gaming hobby, can now be turned towards introducing them to RPGs." Jones criticized the book for having even more dead-weight "filler" than the original Fuzzy Heroes book, but admitted "the remaining text was useful, and it added an entirely new dimension to the game." Jones concluded by giving the book an average rating of 3 out of 6, saying, "While not perfect, this is definitely a book to buy if you liked the Fuzzy Heroes game."
