= A Tyme of Darkness =

A Tyme of Darkness is a 1984 role-playing game supplement published by StaCom Simulations Inc. for Witch Hunt.

== Contents ==
A Tyme of Darkness is a supplement in which supernatural "Visions" are introduced, mystical insights that affect both witches and magistrates. The supplement also includes two short adventure scenarios, and features a calendar for the year 1692.

== Publication history ==
A Tyme of Darkness was written by Richard Driscoll and published by StaCom Simulations Inc. in 1984 as a 20-page book.
