= Diadem (board game) =

Diadem is a 1981 board game published by Fantasy Games Unlimited.

== Gameplay ==
Diadem is a game focused on galactic conquest, played on a mapboard divided into 12 hexagon-shaped sub-maps.

== Reception ==
David Ladyman reviewed Diadem in The Space Gamer No. 46. Ladyman commented that "In sum, I won't tell you not to buy Diadem, but I don't recommend it. There are better-reasoned space warfare games on the market."
