= Westhedge Manifesto =

Westhedge Manifesto is a 1983 role-playing supplement for Ironhedge published by Empire Wargames.

== Contents ==
Westhedge Manifesto is a supplement in which rules are presented for a Western campaign setting in the Blackworld Frontier.

== Publication history ==
Westhedge Manifesto was written by John Brooke, and was published by Empire Wargames in 1983 as two small 12-page booklets with a character card. The 2nd edition was published in 1989 as two small 12-page booklets, a map, and a character card.

== Reception ==
Allen Mixson reviewed Westhedge in White Wolf #30 (Feb., 1992), rating it a 3 out of 5 and stated that "I almost recommend Ganghedge and Westhedge as comic-relief reading. They are still viable for playing as well. For the small size and price, you do get quite a bit here."
