= Melanda: Land of Mystery Character Sheets =

Melanda: Land of Mystery Character Sheets is a role-playing game supplement published by Wilmark Dynasty for Melanda: Land of Mystery.

== Contents ==
Melanda: Land of Mystery Character Sheets is a supplement in which a collection of player aids consisting of character sheets are tailored for each racial type featured in the game. Specifically, it offers five sheets each for the six distinct races: Omenwedur, Uridos, Baladel, Wandel, Gisadel, and Lyradel.

== Publication history ==
Character Sheets was published by Wilmark Dynasty as 30 sheets.
