= Infinite Domains =

Infinite Domains is a generic role-playing game system published by Infinite Concepts in 1996.

== Description ==
Infinite Domains is a universal role-playing system that can be used to create a role-playing game adventure or campaign.

=== Character generation ===
To create a character, the player first randomly determines eight basic attributes — Affinity, Control, Dexterity, Intellect, Speed, Strength, Vitality, and Luck. These then determine nine secondary attributes such as Endurance and Movement. The player then chooses a career from three choices — Warrior, Professional, or Magus — which determines the skills that are available. The player is given a pool of points with which to purchase these skills. Random determinations from a Height & Weight table, and a Family Background Table complete the character.

=== Action Point system ===
During combat, time is divided into six-second rounds. Each character has a number of Action Points equal to one-third of its Speed. Each desired action — fighting, moving, picking a lock, looking for an item — requires a certain number of Action Points. To determine what the character can do in one round, the player "buys" actions with the character's available Action Points. The character can do as many things as the player desires until it runs out of Action Points.

=== Skill resolution ===
To see if a challenging task can be completed successfully, the player must roll percentile dice equal to or less than the relevant skill value that the character possesses.

=== Combat ===
The player determines what sort of attack the character is attempting, rolls percentile dice, and then consults a table to see how much if any damage has been dealt.

== Publication history ==
Infinite Domains, a 110-page softcover book, was created by Steve Hemmesch, illustrated by Anthony Schrock, Damion McDunn, and Pat Thomas, and published by Infinite Concepts in 1996. The company produced no further products.

== Reception ==
In the December 1986 edition of Dragon (#236), Rick Swan was initially skeptical of a "generic" role-playing system, recalling past failures such as Eternal Soldier (1986), and Worlds of Wonder (1982). However, Swan was pleasantly surprised by the "streamlined character creation system", the action point system and the combat system. He was not as impressed by the magic system, or some imprecise language that provided "head-scratching prose." He concluded by giving the book an average rating of 4 out of 6, saying, "For do-it-yourselfers in the market for a universal system, Infinite Domains makes an excellent alternative to GURPS and Fudge; it’s less demanding than the former, more serious than the latter." However, he ended with a warning to prospective gamemasters about the work that would be involved in designing a campaign: "Remember: Infinite Domains has no setting, scenarios, or NPCs. It’s only a frame. You have to provide the picture."
