= Fanhunter =

Fanhunter is a bizarre "universe" created by the Spanish comic author Cels Piñol. The Fanhunter universe combines subcultural elements from comics, science fiction, role playing games, action films... with bizarre parody characters from the Spanish comics scene (comicbooks mailings, meetings, specialized libraries and stores...) acting as constant conspiratorial wink to its target audience.

Characters are mostly inspired in real-life people who are important for the Spanish comic-book and subculture community, and also in fictional characters easily referenced. Alejo Cuervo, for instance, is a real-life publisher who is in good terms with author Piñol, and the Fanhunters were initially a parody of DC Comics characters Manhunters.

== Fanhunter story ==
(Main theme from The A-Team): In 1996, in the city of Barcelona, Alejo Cuervo (an insane ex-librarian who thinks he is possessed by the spirit of Philip K. Dick), proclaims himself as the new Pope Alejo I (killing the old one blowing up the Vatican City), submitting (& bribing some governments) all of Europe to the boring "Dick's Rule" by forbidding almost any form of subculture (video games, comics, DVDs, Roleplaying games, hopscotch) allowing just what he likes: religious music, Breakfast at Tiffany's and the works of Philip K. Dick: "Minority Report", "Blade Runner"... Alejo I decided to create a special force, the Fanhunters, and use the cloned soldiers Tintin Macute (not so intelligent) to annihilate the civilians who still resist: otakus, gamers, comic fans and geeks left in Europe. Barcelona is renamed as Barnacity, being the capital of Europe, now renamed Europe of Dick.

To defend themselves, the rebels created a group "The Resistance" to fight against Pope Alejo I and his evil forces. Many fans organised to defend their ideals and lifestyle, stopping the destruction of imagination that moves the World, using their knowledge of movie, comics, TV shows, books like "V", "Mash", "Konstantin", "The A-Team" o "The Rock".

"The Resistance", with the help of Nick Fury & the Federated Planets Federation, fought Alejo I in Barnacity: it was the 1st Battle of Montjuïc. 90% of the fans died, but Alejo was defeated & auto-exiled himself. Everyone was happy, tyranny was defeated. But...

Juan Krieg took over, installing a regime of terror. An agent of the (former) British M-16 (now renamed the Royal British Resistance, RBR for friends & foes), Reuben Hood, unmasked Krieg: this guy cheated in the D&D Tournament with loaded dice. Alejo I returned (after escaping from a Turkish jail, but this is another story).

Alejo I is a Fenicius, a creature who enlarges its lifespan by selling (or negotiating). It is said that he lived from the ancient times of Carthago, being the founder of Fenice. In the 20th century, selling books and comics in his own Book Shop, he was converted in follower of Philip K. Dick (Sci-Fi writer and Fanknight Warrior of the Light Side of the Pichurrina). When Dick died, murdered by Loki, (Nordic God and Fanknight Warrior of the Dark Side of the Pichurrina) Alejo absorbed part of Dick's Fanknight power and got insane, being used by the forces of the Dark Side of the Pichurrina.

The plot is mainly focused on the fight facts after 2008.

== Comic ==
The Fanhunter comics tells the story about the fight against Alejo and the remaining heroes.

Fanhunter is a bizarre saga.

It started as a self-edited fanzine, and his creator-artist-writer Cels Piñol, personally distribute it himself among the comic book shops.

As time goes by, its popularity rises, and then becomes a nationwide phenomenon, and nowadays it went outside the Spanish frontiers attracting the interest of the Southamerican readers.

Graphically limited (simple, but effective artwork), Cels Piñol attracted the attention of thousands of readers who are identified with his comics, games, characters and concepts.

The humoristic world of the future that Fanhunter reflects, where everything related with comic books, Internet, videogames, role-playing games and other expressions of leisure are forbidden, is a subtle and intelligent reflexion about the dangers of totalitarian regimes, intolerance an fundamentalism.

In the world created by Cels, the true heroes are those comic readers, disk-jockeys, web surfers, role-players, Movie fans, videogame players, and TV lovers with their sub-cultural knowledge treasured during years make them fight against the forces of evil.

They are the last line of defense.

== Role-playing game ==
The Fanhunter role-playing game (in Spanish Fanhunter, el juego de rol épicodecadente, for Fanhunter, the epic decadent role-playing game) lets the player enter the bizarre world of Fanhunter and command the people of the Fanhunter world, which are named Narizones because of their big nose.

== See also ==
- Fanhunter, el juego de rol épicodecadente
