= The Vampyre's Mirror =

The Vampyre's Mirror is a role-playing game adventure published by Wilmark Dynasty for Melanda: Land of Mystery.

== Plot summary ==
The Vampyre's Mirror is an adventure in which a gothic vampire hunting scenario is set within Castle Paradox.

== Publication history ==
The Vampyre's Mirror was written by Lee C. McCormick and published by Wilmark Dynasty as a 12-page book.
