= The Heroes of Poseidonis =

Role-playing game supplement

- Cover art by Michael E. Lee
- Designers: Jay Hartlove; Aimée Hartlove
- Illustrators: Michael E. Lee
- Publishers: DAG Publications
- Publication: 1984
- Genres: Superhero

The Heroes of Poseidonis is a supplement published by DAG Productions in 1984 for the superhero role-playing game Supergame.

== Contents ==
The Heroes of Poseidonis describes the Supergame campaign setting of Poseidonis, a newly-created island in the South Pacific that can be used as a base of operations for the game's superheroes. The historical background of the island is outlined, Rules are included for vehicles and jumping, and a section outlines how superhero groups should be used in a campaign. Floorplans for the base of the superhero group the "Knights" are shown. The book also contains descriptions of 18 pregenerated superheroes and how some of those characters developed their super powers. A double-page centerfold map of the island shows the location of the island's two cities, Pacificus and Atlantis.

== Publication history ==
DAG Productions published the superhero role-playing game Supergame in 1980, and subsequently published an adventure, Reactor, in 1983. This was followed by the supplement The Heroes of Poseidonis in 1984, a 24-page book written by Jay Hartlove and Aimée Hartlove with cover art by Michael Lee.

== Reception ==
In Issue 33 of Abyss, Lew Bryson found the book "tedious", asking why any player would want to use a pregenerated superhero instead of making their own. Bryson also pointed out that some of the superheroes were "absolutely blatant rip-offs", using as an example "a San Francisco cop named Harry who carries a .44 Mag", an obvious reference to cultural icon Dirty Harry.

== Reviews ==
- Comics Feature #37
