= Super Science =

Super Science is a 1986 role-playing game supplement published by Adventure Simulations for Super Squadron.

== Contents ==
Super Science is a supplement in which a comprehensive set of science-fiction rules is offered. It presents a universal design system applicable to any vehicles type, introduces 23 new and revised superhuman powers, and expands the skill set with 66 new and enhanced abilities. Additionally, it features a detailed map of all the star systems within a radius of 40 light-years from Earth.

== Publication history ==
Super Science was written by Joseph Italiano with a cover by Frants Kantor and published by Adventure Simulations (Australia) in 1986 as 60-page book with a two-color removable map.
