= War of the Ring: The Game of Middle Earth =

1976 board wargame by Fantasy Games Unlimited

War of the Ring is a 1976 board wargame published by Fantasy Games Unlimited. It is based on the Middle-earth works of J. R. R. Tolkien.

== Gameplay ==
War of the Ring is a two player game with one player as Gondor and one player as Mordor as they compete to control the One Ring.

== Reception ==
Tony Watson reviewed War of the Ring in The Space Gamer No. 12. Watson commented that "The game plays well as game, but the use of a Diplomacy type system in a game of this nature is questionable."

In the 1978 White Dwarf gaming magazine (Issue 05) it was reviewed by Mike Westhead. He gave it a score of 5 out of 10, disliking the presentation, expense, rule ambiguities and the fact it had no control markers.
