= Citadel (board game) =

Board game

Citadel: A Quest Within a Wizard's Tower is a fantasy board game published in 1976 by Fantasy Games Unlimited.

Cover art, 1976

== Setting ==
An evil wizard has stolen an important talisman, and has hidden it somewhere in his six-level stronghold, the Citadel, which is guarded by minions. The Forces of Good send heroes into the Citadel to try and find the Talisman and escape with it.

Citadel was one of the first board games with modular play areas.

== Description ==
Citadel is a two-player board game designed by Roy Goodman and published by Fantasy Games Unlimited. The entire game is enclosed in a 14-page rulebook, which includes

- six double-sided 11 in × 8 in (280 mm × 200 mm) cardboard map sheets. Each map is marked with a 5 x 5 grid with pre-printed corridors and rooms
- several cardboard sheets of counters

The game is divided into three phases: Set-up, Search, and Escape.

The game features artwork by Roy Krenkel.

== Gameplay ==
=== Setup ===
One player chooses to be the Evil Wizard, and the other player represents the Forces of Good. The two players first agree on how many points they can spend on their respective sides. Reviewer Mike Westhead suggested that 350–450 points results in a two-hour game. The evil set-up includes:

Maps: The player playing the Evil Wizard first chooses six of the map sheets — either the front or back of each of the six map sheets — which will represent the six levels of the Citadel.

Talisman: On one of the maps, the player places the Talisman counter face-down.

Monsters: The player then allocates the agreed-upon points to his minions, choosing from a pool of 25-point humans, 35-point near-humans, 40-point monsters, and if desired, a single 50-point monster. Each one starts with 6 wound points, except the 50-point monster, which has 8 wound points. The chosen monsters are also placed on various places in the Citadel facedown.

Traps: The player can also place up to two sinkholes (10 points each), and up to three pitfalls (5 points each). The player cannot place the Talisman behind an impassable sinkhole, and must place minions and obstacles so that they are accessible from every square on that level without having to pass through another marker.

Doorways: The player must also place at least two entrance doorways and two exit doorways on each level. Doorways can be either one-way or two-way. On one of the levels, the player places the Main Entrance, where the Heroes will enter the Citadel.

All markers except for the Main Entrance are placed facedown.

In contrast, in the good set-up, the player playing the Forces of Good must choose a group of heroes from counters that vary from 25–40 points. The player can also have one 50-point hero. Each hero starts with 6 wound points, except the 50-point hero, which has 8 wound points.

=== Search ===
In the second phase, the Good player sends up to three Heroes into the Main Entrance of the Citadel. If a hero ends their turn adjacent to a marker, and the Good player wants to search that square, the Evil player turns over the marker to reveal what it is, unless it is a one-way Exit marker leading into that level, in which case it remains facedown.

- Exit doorway allowing access to another level: The hero moves to the corresponding Entrance marker on the new level.
- Sinkhole or pitfall: The hero takes damage from the trap
- Monster: Combat ensues

On subsequent turns, the Good player can send more heroes in through the Main Entrance to bolster the original three or to replace heroes who died in traps or via combat, but there can never be more than five heroes in the Citadel at a time.

=== Combat ===
The attacker adds the target's strength to 60, then subtracts the attacker's combat strength, resulting in a target sum. The attacker then rolls percentile dice. For every 20 points the die roll exceeds the target sum, the target suffers a loss of one wound point. If the target loses half of its original wound points, its combat strength is reduced to half. A counter reduced to zero wound points is killed

=== Escape ===
Once a hero discovers the Talisman, the Forces of Good must then successfully retrace their steps to the Main Entrance and escape.

=== Victory Conditions ===
If the Good player succeeds in moving the Talisman through the main entrance, Good prevails. If the Good player runs out of heroes before the Talisman reaches the Main Entrance, then the Evil player wins.

== Reception ==
In the October-November 1977 edition of White Dwarf (Issue #3), Mike Westhead found the game to be original, a good value, and was impressed by the new combat system. However, Westhead thought the game was skewed in favour of the Evil player. He also was not impressed that the game did not supply the required ten-sided dice or any miniature figures, and thought that there was too much math needed for combat. He concluded, "But all in all, Citadel is a simple, well-presented and enjoyable fantasy game" and gave it a rating of 7 out of 10.

== Reviews ==
- Games & Puzzles #66
- Panzerfaust and Campaign #75
