= It Came From the Late, Late, Late Show II: The Exploitation Sequel =

1990 role-playing game supplement

It Came From the Late, Late, Late Show II: The Exploitation Sequel is a 1990 role-playing game supplement published by Stellar Games for It Came From the Late, Late, Late Show.

== Contents ==
It Came From the Late, Late, Late Show II: The Exploitation Sequel is a supplement in which new guidelines are introduced such as Inane Dialogue, and additional rules for emulating kung fu films. The supplement also provides standard movie locations that capture classic exploitation and horror settings, including castles, an old house, and a haunted mansion. The book includes three prewritten adventure scenarios: two designed for monster movie adventures and one tailored specifically for a kung fu film experience.

== Publication history ==
It Came From the Late, Late, Late Show II: The Exploitation Sequel was written by L. Lee Cerny, Bradley K. McDevitt, and Walter H. Mytczynskyj and published by Stellar Games in 1990 as a 56-page book.

== Reviews ==
- Windgeflüster (Issue 28 - Dec 1994)
