= The Hunter Planet Executive Pack =

Tabletop role-playing game

Cover of the cardstock folder that also doubled as a gamemaster's screen

The Hunter Planet Executive Pack, subtitled "The All Australia Role Playing Game", is a light-hearted science fiction role-playing game published by the Australian game company H-PAC (Hunter Planet Adventurers Club) in 1987.

== Description ==
The players take on the role of aliens who have travelled to Earth to go on safari and hunt the unintelligent humans that inhabit the planet. The alien tourists arrive with shoddy or non-functioning equipment and quickly learn that the humans fight back. The role-playing rules are minimal.

The pack contains:

- 32-page rule book
- 32-page adventure – Welcome to Sindee: An Australian Adventure
- 16-page expansion module – "Exile & Arena: Hunter Planet Possibilities"
- Cover sheet listing contents
- 25-page pad of character sheets
- Glossy cardstock folder to hold contents that can be used as a gamemaster's screen

== Publication history ==
David Bruggeman created Hunter Planet in 1986, the first role-playing game to be created and published in Australia. The following year, he created a slightly revised and expanded second edition, The Hunter Planet Executive Pack.

== Reception ==
In the December 1988 edition of Dragon (Issue #140), Ken Rolston thought that "Role-playing a yokel alien visiting Earth is heaps of fun." He liked the "simple and flippant rules", and noted that "the campaign background and adventures are served up with abundant wit and good cheer." He concluded by saying "the playing style is reminiscent of West End Games’ Paranoia game, wherein the [player characters] have lots of fun being slaughtered and otherwise abused by a relentlessly enthusiastic game master.
