= The Tome =

The Tome is a 1985 role-playing game supplement published by Adventure Simulations for Super Squadron.

== Contents ==
The Tome is a supplement in which ten short adventure scenarios are included, and it also introduces 11 new and revised powers, and adds 22 new spells. Additionally, it provides 225 pregenerated non-player characters (NPCs), including both minor villains and civilians.

== Publication history ==
The Tome was written by Joseph Italiano and published by Adventure Simulations (Australia) in 1985 as a 56-page book.
