= Omnigon: The Alien Analog =

Omnigon: The Alien Analog is a 1989 role-playing game supplement published by Omnigon Games Inc. for Omnigon.

== Contents ==
Omnigon: The Alien Analog is a supplement in which 28 different alien races are detailed, and it introduces formidable opponents such as Terran Psionic Priests. It also introduces new skills, weapons, and equipment.

== Publication history ==
Omnigon: The Alien Analog was published by Omnigon Games Inc. in 1990 as a booklet.
