= Supergame (role-playing game) =

Tabletop superhero role-playing game

- First edition cover
- Designers: Jay Hartlove; Aimée Karklyn
- Publishers: DAG Productions; Precis Intermedia
- Publication: 1980
- Genres: Superhero

Supergame is a superhero role-playing game originally published by DAG Productions in 1980, and now published by Precis Intermedia.

== Description ==
Supergame is a superhero system featuring "build-it-yourself" character construction, with superpowers, rules for flying and magic, plus a combat system, armor and weapons, scenario suggestions, and campaign guidelines.

== Publication history ==
Supergame was designed by Jay Hartlove and Aimée Karklyn, and was published by DAG Productions in 1980 as a 64-page book. The second edition was published in 1982 as a 40-page book featuring a color cover.

Supplements included Reactor (1983) and The Heroes of Poseidonis (1984).

The first and second editions are now published as a single volume by Precis Intermedia, with a third edition also available.

== Reception ==
In Issue 33 of Abyss, Lew Bryson liked the game's approach to armor, and also liked the power of transformation described in the rules. But Bryson felt "The game is dragged down by a cumbersome combat system of compared [six-sided dice] rolls." Bryson pointed out that "[A shotgun] does less damage than a pistol ... Come on!" Although Bryson thought the production standards were good for a limited distribution game, the positives were outweighed by "mediocre art, equivocating text, and a disordered scattering of connected information." Bryson concluded, "the game is limited in conception, limited in imagination, and so far, limited in success."

In his book Heroic Worlds, Lawrence Schick described the system as "Undistinguished".

== Reviews ==
- Comics Feature #36
- Comics Feature #37
