= Omnigon =

Science fiction role-playing game

- Designers: Dennis Craig; Scott Groves; Alan P. Widtmann; Glenn Zaroski
- Publishers: Omnigon Games
- Publication: 1989
- Genres: Science fiction

Omnigon is a science fiction space opera role-playing game published by Omnigon Games in 1989.

== Description ==
Omnigon is a science-fiction role-playing system largely based on the rules for Dungeons & Dragons.

Characters can be human or one of five alien races (animal-based humanoids - lizard people, cat-people, etc.). There are six character classes: warrior, rogue, infiltrator, scout, Psionicist, and alpha knight (warriors with some psionics). Character class chosen dictates what skills are available. The game includes combat rules, equipment, and five levels of psionic abilities.

== Publication history ==
Omnigon was designed by Dennis Craig, Scott Groves, Alan P. Widtmann, and Glenn Zaroski, and was published by Omnigon Games in 1989 as a 60-page book. Omnigon also published the supplement Omnigon: The Alien Analog in 1989.

== Reception ==
In Issue 45 of Abyss (Spring 1990), Dave Nalle's first impression was that this book must have been written in 1978, and he was shocked that it had just been released, calling it a throwback to "the days when role-playing was young and fresh and games were poorly designed and unrealistic." Nalle called this "essentially Dungeons & Dragons in space", since it used the same character creation rules, the same character classes, the same level and experience system and the same combat and armor rules. Nalle concluded, "You think if a small company wanted to compete and make a splash in the marketplace they would at least try to offer something that looked vaguely new ... Don't buy Omnigon. If you buy it, I will come to your house and laugh at you."

In Issue 21 of White Wolf #21 (June/July 1990), Stewart Wieck was not impressed, writing, "this game includes everything you need to play a SF campaign, and while the rules are usable, the game falls short of establishing a mood or interesting background." Wieck concluded by giving this game a rating of 2 out of 5.

Lawrence Schick called the game system "simple and rather trite".
