= Worlds Beyond (role-playing game) =

Tabletop science fiction role-playing game

Worlds Beyond is a role-playing game published by Other World Games in 1990. It was acquired by Precis Intermedia in 2020.

== Description ==
Worlds Beyond is a science-fiction space-adventure system in which the player characters can be human or alien (three alien races are available). Character creation rules are skill-based. Rules cover generation of planets, spaceships, and robots. Six sample spaceships are described, with deck plans. Over 20 worlds are described as a campaign background.

== Publication history ==
Worlds Beyond was designed by Frank S. Shewmake with Steve Douglas, Douglas Laedtke, John Damon Lavette, Leigh Skilling, and Gary Warth, with a cover by Frank Lurz, and published by Other World Games in 1990 as a 160-page book. It was re-published as a classic reprint in 2021 by Precis Intermedia.

== Reception ==
Stewart Wieck reviewed Worlds Beyond in White Wolf #21 (June/July 1990), rating it a 4 out of 5 and stated that "The book is plagued with typographical errors, but the wealth of information and nice illustrations far outweigh this fault."

Lawrence Schick comments: "A solid system, simpler than most, but worth a look if Traveller seems too intimidating."

== Reviews ==
- Voyages to the Worlds of SF Gaming (Issue 11 - Apr 1990)
