= Stars Without Number =

Science fiction role-playing game

- Cover art of the Core Edition
- Designers: Kevin Crawford
- Publishers: Sine Nomine Publishing
- Publication: 2010 (original free version); 2011 (Core Edition); 2018 (Revised Edition)
- Genres: Science fiction

Stars Without Number is a science fiction indie role-playing game released by the indie publisher Sine Nomine Publishing in 2010. Although the book contains a pre-generated star system that can be used as a game setting immediately, it also features a system to randomly create planets and adventures. The game was designed as part of the Old School Renaissance (OSR) movement, and its game mechanics are similar to role-playing games from the mid-1970s.

== Description ==
Stars Without Number is a science fiction role-playing game set in the year 3200. The book provides a pre-generated series of planets, but the gamemaster can also use a system of nested random tables to first create a sector in space seeded with random stars. Each star has one main planet, which the gamemaster creates, giving it two randomly generated main attributes as well as five minor story hooks from random tables of Enemies, Friends, Complications, Things, and Places. RPG historian Stu Horvath uses the example of a Cybercommunist planet with Forbidden Tech that has planning computers that can't handle the increasing population. There are sets of tables to generate an adventure, and the book also includes a list of a hundred pre-generated adventure seeds.

The game is part of the OSR movement, and the combat system, saving throws and character attributes are similar to role-playing games of the mid-1970s such as the first edition of Dungeons & Dragons and Metamorphosis Alpha.

There are only four character classes: Warriors (combat), Psychics (magic), Experts (skills), and Adventurers (a blend of the other three classes.) During ship-to-ship combat in space, each character is responsible for a different system on the ship.

== Publication history ==
Kevin Crawford designed Stars Without Number, which was published by Sine Nomine Publishing in 2010 as a free giveaway PDF with cover art by Jimmy Zhang, and interior art by Tamás Baranya, Joe J. Calkins, Pawel Dobosz, Peter Gabor, Angela Harburn, Andrew J. Hepworth, Szilvia Huszár, Eric M. Lofgren, Bradley K. McDevitt, Louis Porter Jr, Jeff Preston, David Sharrock, and Maciej Zagórski.

The following year, Sine Nomine released for sale the "Core Edition", a 254-page book nearly identical to the free PDF, the only difference being the addition of two extra chapters. The "Core Edition" was available in both softcover and hardcover editions, with different cover art on each edition.

In 2018, Sine Nomine published Stars Without Number: Revised Edition, a 325-page book with expanded character creation, refined psionics, improved starship combat, upgraded sandbox tools for creating systems, new adventure creation guidelines, and rules to handle factions. The book was released as a free-version PDF and print-on-demand.

== Related works ==
Since the publication of Stars Without Number, Sine Nomine published several other games in the Without Number series, each based on a different genre and featuring tailored player and GM options, which can be either played standalone, or combined with any of the previous games for multi-genre campaigns.

- Worlds Without Number (released in 2021), for fantasy worlds
- Cities Without Number (released in 2023), for games set in near-future dystopian cyberpunk cities
- Ashes Without Number (released in 2025), for post-apocalyptic worlds

== Reception ==
In Issue 4 of Encounter, Jesse Walker noted "The contents are compatible with most old school clones and are designed to be easily imported to your own favorite gaming system." Walker concluded, "Stars Without Number offers GMs and players the tools to create their own sandbox-style adventures in the far future."

Nick Robinson, writing for Signs and Portents, commented, "Resource tables for random generation of names, NPCs, religions, political parties, architectural styles, and room furnishings excel in generating the kind of fast, smooth content that sandbox gaming demands."

In his 2023 book Monsters, Aliens, and Holes in the Ground, RPG historian Stu Horvath noted, "The system is solid enough, but the real beauty of Stars Without Numbers is as a toolkit for the creation of interstellar sandboxes — it remains unmatched in both its depth and its potential application."
