= GateWar =

GateWar, a fantasy role-playing game published by Escape Ventures in 1994, is the retitled third edition of the role-playing game Element Masters.

== Publication history ==
In the early 1980s, Kenneth D. Burridge designed a fantasy role-playing game called Element Masters that was published by Escape Ventures in 1983 as a 100-page book. The following year, Escape Ventures released a revised and expanded 160-page second edition.

Ten years later, in 1994, Kenneth Burridge and Robert Finkbeiner designed a greatly expanded 270-page third edition retitled GateWar, which was also published by Escape Ventures.

== Gameplay ==
=== Setting ===
The setting of GateWar is the world of Vinya, where magic and technology mix. The player characters are all users of the forgotten discipline of Element Magic. The flora and fauna are a mix of both indigenous lifeforms and invasive alien species, the latter having reached the planet through teleportation portals that were constructed in the ancient past by the native Vinyans.

=== Character generation ===
Character generation starts by choosing one of eight races:

- Geffren (elves)
- Bruff (dwarves)
- Half-Tron (off-spring of the alien Tron and other races)
- Kitzu (pygmy warriors)
- Nequitar (Amazons)
- Zod Bowman (Robin Hood-like archers)
- the Unspeakable (nixies)
- Wellan (enahanced humans)

Characters have a chance of additional powers by becoming a Potential Element Master, partial Drazzi (a race of powerful spellcasters), or a Partial Golden Hero (ancient warrior heroes).

Once the race has been chosen, further details like birthplace and phobias are randomly determined from various tables. The player then rolls five 4-sided dice for each of the character's seven abilities (Strength, Size, Dexterity, Intelligence, Magic Points, Appearance and Luck); the abilities then determine the levels of the skills and professions chosen by the player.

=== Combat ===
In combat, a player rolls percentile dice to determine if a hit is successful. If it is, the player rolls percentile dice to determine the location of the damage and rolls appropriate dice for the weapon used to determine how much damage; all damage is applied to the location previously determined, minus a deduction for the defender's armour (if any).

=== Skills ===
Skill challenges are also resolved using percentile dice and comparing the result to the character's relevant skill rating.

=== Spellcasting ===
Magic uses a point-buy system — every character starts with a bank of Spell Points, and each spell costs a certain number of Spell Points to learn.

== Reception ==
In the February 1995 edition of Dragon (Issue #214), Rick Swan found the rules hearkened back to game systems of the early 1980s, calling them "fairly standard, old-fashioned even." He didn't think the setting of Vinya compared well to major competitors, but did admire its originality, saying, "Though Vinya, the game setting, won’t make anyone forget Glorantha or Krynn, it boasts an appealing cast of characters and an extraordinary menagerie of wacky creatures." But Swan found the spells unimaginative, the weapons standard, and "the game relies too much on stock fantasy conventions." However, Swan did think some players might be attracted to the game despite its out-of-date rules, saying, "the whimsical flourishes [...] make the GateWar RPG worth a look for fans of the offbeat."

Rich Warren reviewed GateWar in White Wolf Inphobia #54 (April, 1995), rating it a 2 out of 5 and stated that "While you could harvest some ideas from this game to use with others, they're not worth [the price]."

In a retrospective review in the May 2000 edition of Serendipity's Circle (Issue 19), Julie Hoverson thought the typesetting and layout "well done", and called the many sidebars "fantastic examples of the rules being described in the main text." She found the graphics and art "of average quality but very appropriate and well placed." She admired the number of alien races outlined, calling them "some of the most bizarre, horrifying, unbalancing and out of place creatures ever detailed." She also noted the amount of detail about Vinya that was provided, calling it "a very complete campaign world." However, Hoverson thought the rules system, essentially unchanged since 1984, showed its age, commenting, "This game is everything role-playing was, detail to the max and randomized at every opportunity." She concluded by giving it an average rating of 3 out of 5, saying, "GateWar is truly a master work of some dedicated players but it will always feel like someone else's world. If you want something different, action oriented and ready to play, this is it. You will find it hard to change things enough to make a campaign unique but there are plenty of gems to be pirated to existing game worlds."

== Other reviews ==
- Shadis #26 (April, 1996)
- Australian Realms #26
