= L'Ultime Epreuve =

L'Ultime Epreuve is a 1983 role-playing game published by Jeux Actuels.

== Gameplay ==
L'Ultime Epreuve is a game in which an introductory roleplaying set presents the World of Lynaïs, with rules, scenarios, character sheets, and supporting materials.

== Reviews ==
- Casus Belli #38
- Jeux & Stratégie #24
