= Manhunter (role-playing game) =

Tabletop role-playing game

- Manhunter cover
- Designers: Ramon P. Moore; Buck Shomo; Gary Sibley
- Publishers: Kingslayer Productions; Myrmidon Press
- Publication: 1988 (First Edition); 1990 (Second Edition); 1994 (Rifts Sourcebook)
- Genres: Science fiction space western
- Systems: Megaversal System

Manhunter is a role-playing game originally published by Kingslayer Productions in 1988.

== Description ==
The Manhunter system features much savage hi-tech combat, set in the far-future Manhunter universe, for which a history and star charts are provided. It is a skill-based system, with four types of skills: Finesse (acrobatics, archery, light blades, etc.), Manual (brawling, climbing, heavy blades, etc.), Mental (scientific, magical, psionic), and Reaction (piloting, fast draw, etc.). The rules also cover personal combat, space combat, experience, robots, three alien races, and a brief spell list. The game includes a GM's screen The 2nd edition adds an introductory scenario with a description of a space port but lacks the GM's screen. Subsequent editions published by Myrmidon Press expanded the number of playable races to twelve and adopted the Megaversal System RPG system developed by Palladium Books.

== Setting ==
Manhunter takes place in a distant future where humanity has discovered faster-than-light travel and began to colonize the galaxy. While on such an exploration mission, a human scout ship encountered a more technologically advanced alien race called Aglians. The encounter went poorly resulting in the destruction of the scout ship. The human colonists believed the Aglians were a threat and formed a fleet to seek retribution for what they perceived as Aglian aggression. The Aglians were a peaceful civilization dedicated to scientific advancement and were horrified at humanity's history of warfare and aggressive expansionism. To contain the violent actions of these human colonists, the Aglians created the Manhunters, a sentient race of androids whose purpose was to fight and contain humanity. After a short five month campaign, the human colonies were decimated by Manhunter assaults. Believing that a proper lesson had been taught to prevent future aggression from humans, the Aglians recalled their Manhunter robots for deactivation.

The Manhunter robots refused the order to stand down. To prevent future human aggression, the Manhunters believed that all human settlements must be conquered to prevent humanity from ever threatening the galaxy. They also declared that any alien race that aids humans would suffer the same fate. Once the Manhunter robots returned to their campaign, the Aglians made diplomatic overtures to humanity and formed a joint government to fight the Manhunter threat called the Aglian Terran Planetary Defense System (ATPDS). The joint government was able to mount a successful defense against the Manhunters until the robots were nearly defeated. The surviving Manhunters fled into uncharted space and remained hidden for over fifty years.

Now the Manhunter robots have returned to continue their campaign. However, the Manhunters now rely on stealth, infiltration, and hit and run tactics rather than direct military assaults. These attacks are designed to sow chaos and discontent among human colonies and sour relations with other alien races and star nations encountered since the Manhunters' disappearance. The Manhunters have also recruited alien allies to aid in their efforts against the powerful Aglian Terran Planetary Defense System government.

== Fictional universe ==
The 'Manhunter' universe incorporates many common themes found in both science fiction and space westerns. Faster-than-light travel has been achieved by multiple races who are now colonizing their local area of the galaxy. Several powerful star nations exist along with secret societies, guilds, and rebellious colonies. The western elements come into play in the region known as Exile Space with similarities to the American Frontier of the famous Wild West. The main thread is the oncoming threat of the Manhunter robots return and their desire to conquer humanity and any other alien race or nation that gives aid to humans.

=== Races ===
Players can choose to be members from up to 12 alien races. These range from Aglians, Chiropti, Derkosian, Gorushan, Kirn, Malatriani, Qulak, Shigat, Sim (Synthetic human), Terran (human), Turzig, or Ular. Each alien race has different bonuses and character attribute statistics to represent their varying biological advantages and disadvantages. Additional sentient alien species are present in the Manhunter universe, but are not available as playable characters.

=== Powerful Organizations ===
The known space of the Manhunter universe is best divided into three regions: Aglian Terran Planetary Defense System (ATPDS), Exile Space, and beyond Exile Space. The ATPDS forms the largest and most powerful centralized government. Exile Space is largely a frontier region composed of independent colonies and smaller space empires. The region beyond Exile Space is unexplored and home to Gorushan Marauders and Manhunter robots.

==== Aglian Terran Planetary Defense System (ATPDS) ====
The Aglian Terran Planetary Defense System is the most powerful star nation in the known space of the Manhunter universe. Their area of space contains both home worlds and number of extra solar colonies for Terran, Aglian, Kirn, and Ular. The Kirn and Ular fought a bitter interstellar war before being encountered by explorers and were incorporated into the ATPDS government. This region of space is also home to multiple wealthy corporations who wield vast political and economic influence throughout known space. This region also contains True Earth, a planetary slum devastated by overpopulation and climate change, that is now largely the forgotten home world of humanity. ATPDS Space is home to the Bloodhood Bounty Hunter's Guild. The Bloodhood was formed through a merging of human and Chiropti martial codes to create a warrior society to help keep the peace on the frontier. This guild has a strict code of conduct for its members and provides extensive training. This turned the organization into an elite warrior society of bounty hunters throughout known space.

==== Exile Space ====
Exile Space is vast and composed of multiple colonies, mostly human, not affiliated with the ATPDS government. With no centralized government, this area of space is considered to be a lawless frontier of small independent colonies and nations. The Decahedron Compact is the most powerful government in Exile Space that was initially formed among ten powerful colonies and has been expanding its influence throughout the region. The Chiropti Empire is a fast-expanding and aggressive space empire at the edge of Exile Space that was formed when Terran explorers traded FTL and other high technology with the Chiropti people. Exile Space is also home to the Holy Order of the Void, a mysterious religious cult centered around an ancient crashed spaceship that often provides highly advanced cybernetic implants to devout followers.

==== Beyond Exile Space ====
The area beyond Exile Space towards the Galactic Core is largely unexplored or colonized by either Terrans or Aglians. This area contains the Gorushan Empire and suspected Manhunter strongholds. However, the exact location of either are unknown. The Gorushan Empire routinely sends marauders into Exile Space to conduct raids and acts of piracy against undefended colonies and trade routes. This area of space is also the source of Derkosians and Malatriani refugees in Exile Space. Both races' respective home worlds were conquered by the Gorushans.

== Publication history ==
Manhunter: Science Fiction-Fantasy Role Playing Game was designed by Ramon P. Moore, with art by Jerry Bingham, and published by Kingslayer Productions in 1988 as a 72-page book with a cardstock screen. A second edition was published in 1990 as a 112-page book.

Into the Bloodhood: The Guilding of Bounty Hunters in Manhunter was a supplement published in 1990.

Rifts: Manhunter: A Megaverse Sourcebook was written by Buck Shomo based on Ramon P. Moore's concept, with cover art by Jerry Bingham, and published by Myrmidon Press in 1994 as a 196-page book. This book uses the Megaversal System published by Palladium Books and is designed to be used as supplemental material within the Rifts role-playing game. The book also includes a foreword by Kevin Siembieda.

== Reception ==
Stewart Wieck reviewed Manhunter in White Wolf #15 (April/May 1989), rating it a 3 out of 5 and stated that "Manhunter's greatest weakness is its lack of a detailed environment. In order to stand out among the many games available today, a new game has to be able to present an image for itself. While 'Manhunter' may not be able to do this, those who look closely and examine the game will find a healthy game system which is likely suited to all their SF campaign needs."

In his 1990 book The Complete Guide to Role-Playing Games, game critic Rick Swan reviewed the first edition, and thought the character generation system was "quite clever", and likewise thought the section on robotics was "excellent." However, he found the actual game mechanics "far too complicated, most notably the combat system, whose convoluted formulas slow the action to a crawl." Given the hard science edge to the game, Swan found the magic system an oddity, commenting "though playable, it's jarringly out of place in this setting." Swan concluded by giving this game a rating of 2.5 out of 4, saying, "Manhunter has a number of good ideas, but it's hard to tell how they're supposed to fit together. A sample adventure would have helped, as would a sharper focus. Still, for a first-time designer, Manhunter is an impressive effort."

Allen Mixson reviewed Manhunter in White Wolf #40 (1994), rating it a 4 out of 5 and stated that "Over all, Manhunter is an excellent product. It is cleanly packaged, well illustrated and well thought out. I hope we see more from Myrmidon Press to support the game. As it is, Manhunter is a stand-alone product; all you need to start is here."
