= Active Exploits =

- Active Exploits diceless roleplaying
- Designers: Brett M. Bernstein
- Publishers: Precis Intermedia Gaming
- Publication: 2002-2003
- Genres: Universal
- Systems: Diceless

Active Exploits is a diceless set of role-playing game rules by Precis Intermedia Gaming. The core rules (which contain no setting) are distributed for free as a PDF file, or for a fee as a printed book. There are a number of published game settings and official game conversions which use these rules.

The system is considered innovative, but more in common with GURPS and Unisystem, rather than other diceless games such as Amber and Nobilis

The game has options for freeform and live action role-playing, as well as for converting the game to other systems. Ample conversion rules allow the adaptation of the engine to a number of commercial systems.

== Published Settings and Official Conversions ==
Active Exploit has converted other published RPGs into diceless versions.

- Sengoku: Chanbara, a role-playing game based in Feudal Japan.
- Dreamwalker, a setting taking place in others' dreams.
- Blood Island Diceless, swashbuckling adventures on the high seas.
- CORPS Diceless, based on CORPS, a conspiracy themed RPG about UFOs, vampires, secret societies, etc.
- Bloodshadows (3rd Edition) core book has Active Exploits conversion rules.

== Awards ==
The game won an Indie RPG award in 2003 for free game of the year and best support.

== Modes of Play ==
=== Basic Exploits ===
This is an introductory version of the rules, intended for those who are new to the system or prefer something less involved.

=== Advanced Exploits ===
This presents both advanced and optional rules which players can selectively use. Some examples of advanced elements are:

- Flairs: These zoom in on character's abilities.
- Fields of Expertise: These replace the need for skills by generalizing occupational knowledge.
- Convictions: These expand on the basic concept of Principles (in Basic Exploits) by utilizing Revelation and Dementia.
- Threads: These define group dynamics and help encourage more character-oriented roleplaying.
- Vehicles: Rules for using vehicles, from motorcycles to starships.

=== Live Exploits ===
These are guidelines from the Basic and Advanced Exploits sections which are optimized for live action role-playing.

=== Adaptive Exploits (Special Edition Softcover only) ===
A framework for converting characters from other game systems for use with Active Exploits, and adapting other ability/skill-based systems for diceless play.

=== Other features ===
Setting Specifics, which add new rules for magic and the occult, and martial arts.
