= Melanda: Land of Mystery =

Tabletop role-playing game

Melanda: Land of Mystery is a role-playing game published by Wilmark Dynasty in 1980.

== Description ==
Melanda is a fantasy role-playing system. The game includes rules for character creation, combat, and magic, with descriptions of monsters, equipment, six character races, and the world of Melanda. Ability scores are determined by what skills the character studies as a youth. In the game's rune-carving magic system, a character learns various magic runes that modify and act on each other to create varying effects.

== Publication history ==
Melanda: Land of Mystery was designed by John M. Corradin and Lee C. McCormick and published by Wilmark Dynasty in 1980 as 56 loose-leaf pages, an outer folder, and two dice. The second edition was published in 1981 as a 64-page book.

Supplements included Melanda: Land of Mystery Character Sheets and the adventure The Vampyre's Mirror.

== Reception ==
C.D. Martin reviewed Melanda: Land of Mystery for Different Worlds magazine and stated that "Melanda is an interesting design that suffers terribly from a lack of development. The people at Wilmark were too close to their work to see the problems it would pose for the average gamer. However, they should not be downhearted. RuneQuest is in its second edition and Tunnels & Trolls is in its fifth (!) incarnation. Someday there may be an expanded second edition Melanda that will live up to its full promise. Until then, fantasy role-players seeking different worlds are advised to try The Fantasy Trip, RuneQuest, or Tunnels & Trolls."

Lawrence Schick called this game "several years ahead of its time", the combat system "quite original" and the magic system "Perhaps the most innovative".
