= Starships & Spacemen =

Tabletop science fiction role-playing game

Starships & Spacemen is a role-playing game published by Fantasy Games Unlimited in 1978.

== Description ==
Starships & Spacemen is a science-fiction space-adventure system. The rules cover character creation, experience, the Space Fleet Service, human and alien races, psionics, alien plants and animals, equipment, spaceships and spaceship combat, and running the game. The focus is ship combat and problem-solving; personal combat is de-emphasized.

== Publication history ==
Starships & Spacemen was designed by Leonard H. Kanterman, M.D., with art by Rick Bryant, and was published by Fantasy Games Unlimited in 1978 as an 86-page book with two cardstock reference sheets.

Starships & Spacemen is now owned by Goblinoid Games, who released a 2nd edition of it in 2013 via crowdfunding.

== Reception ==
Richard Bartucci reviewed Starships & Spacemen in The Space Gamer No. 18. Bartucci commented that "With all of the SF genre to draw upon, Dr. Kanterman has restricted himself almost entirely to a universe that has been so thoroughly explored and documented that further exposition is just wearisome."

Don Turnbull reviewed Starships & Spacemen for White Dwarf #8, and stated that "I like these rules, consider them carefully planned and well executed, and would certainly select them as the basis of the SF role-playing game would involve myself in if only time (and D&D!) permitted."

Andrew Rilstone did a retrospective review of Starships and Spacemen for Arcane magazine, stating that "At a time when many people had not worked out that wargames and roleplaying games were two different things, S&S offered something calculated to encourage roleplaying in a background that stimulated the referee into having ideas of his own. For that, it deserves some recognition."

== Reviews ==
- Different Worlds #8
