= Beasts, Men & Gods =

Beasts, Men & Gods is a 1980 role-playing game published by The Game Masters.

== Gameplay ==
Beasts, Men & Gods is a game in which a fantasy role-playing system features character creation, magic, and combat. The character creation system introduces paired attributes—such as Strength and Constitution—that share a randomized base roll, ensuring related traits remain logically balanced. It also distinguishes between fixed Hit Points and level-scaling Stamina, allowing for realistic damage thresholds while accommodating skill-based survivability through dodges and parries. Magic is governed by a Mana Point system and organized into distinct Schools, including religious traditions, each with specialized and general spells. This structure prevents incongruous spell access across different magical affiliations. Spellcasting involves level-based costs, concentration mechanics, and risks of failure or backfire. Combat operates on a percentile system with a streamlined hit location mechanic. Damage is absorbed first by Stamina, then by Hit Points, with missile attacks bypassing defensive maneuvers. The rules include detailed tables for critical hits, body-specific injuries, and dynamic combat events like tripping or weapon breakage.

== Publication history ==
Beasts, Men & Gods was written by Bill Underwood. Underwood later published an updated version of the game in PDF format.

== Reception ==
Bill Pixley reviewed Beasts, Men and Gods for Pegasus magazine and stated that "Beasts, Men and Gods handles the three basics of fantasy role-playing systems, Magic, Character Creation, and Combat, far better than many other systems on the market today. In one book, all a person will ever need to run a campaign is available. The only problem that the rule set has is that an example adventure would be useful to starting adventurers. | can say that | heartily recommend the system for fantasy role-playing."
