= It Came From the Late, Late, Late Show =

Tabletop role-playing game

- Cover art by Bradley K. McDevitt
- Designers: Bradley K. McDevitt; Lee Cerny; Walter H. Mytczynskyj
- Illustrators: Bradley K. McDevitt
- Publishers: Stellar Games
- Publication: 1989
- Genres: Humorous horror

It Came From the Late, Late, Late Show is a light-hearted role-playing game published by Stellar Games in 1989 that seeks to emulate the low-budget horror B movies that were aired on late-night television in the 1950s–60s.

== Description ==
It Came From the Late, Late, Late Show is a role-playing game in which the player characters are actors in low budget horror movies like those produced by Roger Corman. After a short introduction to explain the game's concept, the book is divided into ten chapters. The first six are for the players:

- "Casting Your Actor": Simple guidelines for character generation.
- "Talents": All of the possible skills that can be used are listed.
- "In the Heat of Combat": Rules for combat, including time management, which is measured in sequences, takes, and reels.
- "Weapons": A list of available weapons and other combat-related equipment.
- "The Properties Department": Various props that can be used.
- "Wardrobe": Clothing and costumes.

The last four chapters are for the gamemaster:

- "The Director's Section": How to stage scenarios like they are low-budget movies.
- "Monster Generation": How to create and use monsters, and how to enhance them with special effects.
- "Monsters": A catalogue of pre-made monsters.
- "Extras": A list of non-player characters from a cheerleader to a government agent.

== Publication history ==
It Came From the Late, Late, Late Show was designed by Bradley K. McDevitt, Lee Cerny and Walter H. Mytczynskyj, and published by Stellar Games in 1989 as a 56-page book with illustrations by McDevitt. The following year, Stellar released a second edition, It Came From the Late, Late, Late Show II: The Exploitation Sequel, and a third edition was published in 1993.

== Reception ==
In Issue 18 of White Wolf, Richard Thomas called this "a funny game which can be tailored to any bad movie or genre that the players desire. I wonder how often the game will be played in the long run, but for the price it seems a pretty good deal." Thomas concluded by giving the game a rating of 3 out of 5.

In Issue 45 of Abyss, Joh Schuller thought this game "has some interesting features, although ultimately it falls short of its mark." Schuller found the Talents/Skills selection "interesting, but not particularly comprehensive, and the system leaves too much to chance." Schuller found the explanation of Combat puzzling, pointing out "how Talents apply in combat is never explained. There is no indication what dice are rolled in combat or how attacks are resolved." Schuller concluded, "Basically, Late Show is a good idea which is very poorly executed."

In the September 1990 edition of Dragon (#161), Jim Bambra was amused by this game which "lets you play second-rate actors in some of the worst movies ever produced." He recommended it, saying, "Cheap tongue-in-cheek fun, this game is well worth a look."

In his 1990 book The Complete Guide to Role-Playing Games, game critic Rick Swan found that this game "only hints at the potential of the premise." Swan called the character generation rules "mundane", the list of character skills "unimaginative", and the combat system "convoluted" and "desperately out of place in a game this simple." Swan concluded by giving the game a poor rating of 2 out of 4, saying, "There are a lot of good ideas lurking in Late Show, but the game can't seem to find them."

In his 1991 book Heroic Worlds: A History and Guide to Role-Playing Games, Lawrence Schick commented that "the rules are really secondary to such guideline sections as 'Acting Appropriately Stupid' (explaining why you shouldn't run away when you suspect there are blood-sucking monsters around) and 'Crummy Endings' (tricks for the GM to pull when a scenario goes wrong, e.g., 'Suddenly the sun rises and all the monsters shrivel up and die')."

== Other reviews and commentary ==
- Windgeflüster (Issue 28 - Dec 1994, in German)
