= Element Masters =

Fantasy and science fiction role-playing game

Element Masters is a role-playing game published by Escape Ventures in 1983 that mixes elements of fantasy and science fiction.

== Gameplay ==
The setting of Element Masters is the world of Vinya, where magic and technology mix. The PCs are all users of the forgotten discipline of Element Magic.

=== Character generation ===
Character generation starts by choosing a race: humans, elves, dwarves, unspeakables (half-sized humans) and half-trons. Each race has advantages and disadvantages. The referee may also offer players the option to play one of the game's monsters as a character race.

Once the race has been chosen, the player then rolls five 4-sided dice for each of the character's eight abilities (Strength, Constitution, Dexterity, Intelligence, Wisdom, Magic Points, Appearance, and Luck). These can be augmented by military training. The player rolls percentile dice to determine Handedness. The character must also be bound to one of the four classical elements (Fire, Water, Earth, Air); again percentile dice are used to determine this. The player then chooses skills from a list of over forty, and weapons and armor from an extensive list. The character's hometown is randomly determined, as is previous training in certain areas.

=== Combat ===
In combat, a player rolls percentile dice to determine if a hit is successful. If it is, the player rolls percentile dice to determine the location of the damage and rolls appropriate dice for the weapon used to determine how much damage; all damage is applied to the location previously determined, minus a deduction for the defender's armor (if any).

=== Skills ===
Skill challenges are also resolved using percentile dice and comparing the result to the character's relevant skill rating.

=== Spellcasting ===
Magic uses a point-buy system — every character starts with a bank of Spell Points, and each spell costs a certain number of Spell Points to learn.

== Publication history ==
Element Masters was designed by Kenneth D. Burridge and published by Escape Ventures in 1983 as a 100-page book. A year later, Escape Ventures published a revised and expanded second edition as a 160-page book with a map and a sample character record sheet.

The adventure campaign The First Border Patrol was published in 1983.

Ten years later, in 1994, Escape Ventures published a greatly expanded 270-page third edition retitled GateWar.

== Reception ==
In the May 1985 edition of Dragon, Tom Armstrong liked the detail of the setting, and found no serious problems with the game rules. He concluded, "All in all, I found the game great fun... It could easily develop into a major competitor in the fantasy role-playing market."

In Issue 39 of Different Worlds, Scott Dollinger found the text "fairly well written, although typos and awkward phrasing are far from uncommon." But Dollinger found the artwork to be inconsistent: "Illustrations in the monster section are quite good, but the rules illustrations and cover art leave a great deal to be desired." Dollinger liked the character generation system up to a point, but questioned the large number of skills available, asking if that "merely serve[s] to remove the burden of being inventive from the players and delegate it to dice." Dollinger also questioned skills such as 'Ingenious Idea', "where the player can arrive at the perfect solution to any problem or solution based on a roll of the dice [which] seems to defeat one of the fundamental principles of role-playing, the idea that survival is based on thinking as much as, if not more than, fighting." Dollinger found the combat system simple and effective, and also liked the magic system, especially element magic, which he called "incredibly powerful and offers an opportunity for players to exercise a great deal of creativity." Dollinger concluded by giving the game a rating of 3 out of 4, saying, "Element Masters may never replace your favorite game, but it represents a worthwhile effort and is well worth looking into."

Jon Schuller, writing for Abyss, called this "one of the weird ones." Schuller found the magic system too open-ended, noting, "Perhaps the biggest problem is that there seems to be no spell learning system. Everyone seems to be able to cast every spell if they can cast spells at all." Schuller found the combat system confusing and not well-organized, calling it "definitely the weakest of the mechanical sections of the rules." Schuller felt there wasn't enough integration of skills, magic and combat, and also noted "an awfully heavy reliance on random die rolls rather than originality and imagination." Schuller concluded, "Although there are a lot of rough areas and the game seems incomplete, especially in the area of background, I think I can recommend Element Masters for some players, but as an aid, not a game."

In his 1990 book The Complete Guide to Role-Playing Games, game critic Rick Swan also disliked the 'Ingenious Idea' skill, noting "Problem solving shouldn't be handled by dice rolls — players should have to come up with solutions themselves." Swan called the combat and magic systems "detailed but not overly complicated" and found some of the monsters were "strikingly original." Swan gave the game a rating of 3 out of 4, saying, "Element Masters suffers from crude graphics and occasionally clumsy writing, but overall, it's an inventive, entertaining RPG, an excellent alternative to conventional fantasy games."
