= Odysseus (role-playing game) =

Tabletop role-playing game

Odysseus is a role-playing game published by Fantasy Games Unlimited in 1980.

== Description ==
Odysseus is a legendary/historical system, mixing the heroic and classical ages of ancient Greece. The game includes rules for character creation, combat, warship movement and combat, plus guidelines for campaigns and interference by the gods.

== Publication history ==
Odysseus was designed by Marshall T. Rose and published by Fantasy Games Unlimited in 1980 as a 32-page book and four cardstock sheets.

== Reception ==
Elisabeth Barrington reviewed Odysseus in The Space Gamer No. 31. Barrington commented that "As new RP systems go, this one is above average. Only one book, and it is well-designed. Historical gamers specializing in the classic period, this is for you."

Donald Dupont reviewed Odysseus for Different Worlds magazine and stated that "Odysseus is a disappointment. The role-playing world could use a good Heroic Age game system. With a great deal of interpretation and interpolation, Odysseus is perhaps usable by players familiar with role-playing systems, but the confused nature of its rules, and the lack of color in its world hardly make it worthwhile."

Lawrence Schick commented that the game was "Indifferently researched; closer to fantasy than to history."
