= Super Squadron =

Tabletop superhero role-playing game

Super Squadron is a superhero role-playing game published by the Australian company Adventure Simulations in 1983.

== Description ==
Super Squadron is a role-playing game system in which players create superheroes and then role-play the characters' adventures.

=== Character creation ===
The origin of each character — Mutation, Alien or Self-Developed — is determined randomly, and this results in the character receiving various superpowers. The creation process also generates a background story for each character that might include romantic relationships, marriage and even children.

The "Rule Book" (60 pages) covers character creation and descriptions of over 75 powers, magic spells, artifacts, encounters, world background, and romantic involvements. The "Adventure Book" (24 pages) includes ten miniscenarios of gradually increasing complexity that teach the GM and player how to play. The game comes with a character record sheet pamphlet.

== Publication history ==
Super Squadron was designed by Joseph Italiano and published by the Australian company Adventure Simulations in 1983.

The second edition was published in 1984 as a boxed set including a 60-page book, the 24-page introductory adventures book, character sheets, and a pamphlet of character outlines to be customised to represent players characters.

The Tome, published April 1985, was a 54-page book of 10 longer adventures, large numbers of non-player characters, and new and revised skills and powers.

Super Science, published June 1986, was the final supplement with expanded rules on powers, vehicles and running a space campaign. It included a statistics system for planets and civilisations, and a large double-sided galaxy scale map.

== Reception ==
In Issue 73 of Space Gamer, William A. Barton commented "If you have no qualms about random power generation [...] Super Squadron is definitely a game you should check out. Even if you don't wish to switch from Champions, Superworld, or V&V, SS has a lot of source material [...] you'll find useful."

In his 1990 book The Complete Guide to Role-Playing Games, game critic Rick Swan called this "easy to play yet comprehensive, with an especially good section on character creation." Swan liked the "refreshing emphasis on the hero's private life, including suggestions for romance and marriage." Swan concluded by giving this game a solid rating of 3 out of 4, saying, "Though Super Squadron is unlikely to replace Villains & Vigilantes or Champions as anyone's favorite generic superhero game, it's an entertaining alternative for those who enjoy role-playing as much as bashing bad guys."

== Other reviews and commentary ==
- Multiverse (Issue 4 - Winter 1985)
- Game News (Issue 3 - May 1985)
