= Ironhedge =

Tabletop role-playing game

Ironhedge is a role-playing game published by Empire Wargames in 1979.

== Description ==
Ironhedge is a fantasy system with fully compatible supplements for other genres: western, science fiction, and gangsters. The rulebook (two copies included in the Ironhedge Complete Game) is pocket-sized; the rules are very concise. Campaign-setting and scenario material are presented on 72 cards (3" x 5"), printed with very small illustrations and text. Each card has a short description of a region or a small encounter area. The Ironhedge Complete Game also includes encounter form cards and character record cards. There is no art on the black box cover of the 1st edition. The 2nd edition is revised for clarity.

== Publication history ==
Ironhedge was designed by John Brooke, and published by Empire Wargames in 1979 as the Ironhedge Manifesto, a 40-page digest-sized book. The second edition was published in 1983 as two small (4" x 6") booklets (40-page revised Ironhedge, plus 1st-edition Westhedge). The third edition was published in 1985 as a small (4" x 6") booklet (40 pages, revised again). The fourth edition was published in 1987 as a small (3 1/2" x 5") 40-page book (revised again) with 18 cards, that was sold separately or as part of the Ironhedge Complete Game, which was a digest-sized box containing two small (3 1/2" x 5") 40-page books (4th-edition rules), a color cardstock map, 72 color cards, 36 form cards, dice, and a pencil. The fifth edition was published in 1989 as a small (3 1/2" x 5") 40-page book (revised some more) with 18 cards, that was sold separately or as part of the Ironhedge Complete Game.

Supplements included the Ganghedge Manifesto, Starhedge Manifesto, and Westhedge Manifesto.

== Reception ==
Stewart Wieck reviewed Ironhedge in White Wolf #12 (1988) and stated that "Ironhedge is a complete RPG game. All the rules are here and an entire world is presented. The game system itself is a little simplistic, but this seems to be the goal of the game - to cut down on unnecessary complications. The system does serve its purpose."

In his 1990 book The Complete Guide to Role-Playing Games, game critic Rick Swan found the game system to be "adequate, if a bit underdeveloped" but admired the adventure deck, noting, "With beautiful graphics and a staggering amount of detail, the adventure deck is one of the best RPG components I've ever seen." Swan concluded by giving the game a rating of 2.5 out of 4, saying, "If the rules are set aside, Ironhedge functions quite nicely as a source of supplementary material for D&D and other fantasy campaigns."

Lawrence Schick comments on the game's "undistinguished D&D-inspired rules, notable for its unusual format and for the author's eccentric philosophical rants. The rules and scenario material are laced with quasi-Libertarian slogans and doggerel, especially in the first four editions. (Example: 'In another time/In another place/Lived a worthless/Human race/Lotsa jewels/And lotsa gold/Kinda rich/And sorta old.' Pretty catchy, eh?)" Schick also notes that the 2nd edition of the boxed set (with 5th-edition rules) "unfortunately lacks much of the unique eccentricity of the earlier editions".
