= Reactor (Supergame) =

Role-playing game sourcebook

- Designers: Jay Hartlove; Aimée Hartlove
- Publishers: DAG Productions
- Publication: 1983
- Genres: Superhero RPG

Reactor is sourcebook published by DAG Productions in 1983 for the superhero role-playing game Supergame.

== Description ==
Reactor contains four short adventure scenarios centered around a nuclear power plant. It also provides detailed descriptions and illustrations of 13 supervillains known as Vortex, who gained their powers due to a reactor meltdown.

== Publication history ==
Supergame was published by DAG Productions in 1980, and was followed by two supplements, Reactor (1983), and The Heroes of Poseidonis (1984). Reactor was written by Jay Hartlove and Aimée Hartlove as a 16-page book.

== Reception ==
In Issue 33 of Abyss, Lew Bryson pointed out that less than 3 of the 16 pages were devoted to four short scenario ideas, while the rest of the book was dedicated to descriptions of villains and a nuclear power plant. Bryson responded, "No, no, no. I did not like this, not much at all."

== Reviews ==
- Comics Feature #37
