= Monster Care Squad =

Fantasy tabletop role-playing game

Legends of Ald-Amura
- Designers: Nemesis, Alvhild Sand, Guanzon, Sangjun Park, Jonathan Gilmour, Gabriel Komisar, Jan Martin, J.R. Zambrano,
- Illustrators: Leafie
- Publishers: Sandy Pug Games
- Publication: 2020
- Genres: tabletop role-playing game
- Systems: Powered by the Apocalypse
- Skills: role-playing

Monster Care Squad is a fantasy tabletop role-playing game by Sandy Pug Games about veterinarians for gods and monsters. It was inspired by Studio Ghibli films. Players inhabit the role of a 'Monster care Specialist', and are tasked with healing creatures of the world.

== Description ==
Gameplay involves co-operation between players. It uses variations on the Powered by the Apocalypse game engine by Meguey Baker and Vincent Baker.

Reviewers have drawn analogies between the game's systems and that of Apocalypse World, Ryuutama, and Monster of the Week. Players roll two six-sided dice that affect the outcome of particular gameplay moments in combination with 'natural talents' of their character.

Alternative rules are available for solo play. Additionally, a 'mentor system' allows for GM participation alongside players.

The game's art style has been compared to Pokemon, Nausiccaa of the Valley of the Wind, and Monster Hunter.

== Reception ==
Monster Care Squad was funded by a Kickstarter campaign in July–August 2020 that raised $72,995 from 2027 backers.

Linda Codega for Gizmodo called it a "masterpiece of game design...full of incredibly vivid, wonderfully rendered creatures and characters, drawn by Leafie."
