= Ten Candles =

Tabletop role-playing game

- Cover art by JC Park
- Designers: Stephen Dewey
- Publishers: Cavalry Games
- Publication: 2015
- Genres: tabletop role-playing game, horror, tragedy
- Playing time: 2-4 hours
- Skills: role-playing, storytelling

Ten Candles is a tragic horror indie role-playing game that uses ten votive candles to mark time. It was designed by Stephen Dewey and published by Cavalry Games in 2015.

== Description ==
Ten Candles is a collaborative storytelling game set in a world where "Endless night has fallen. The world is ending. Monsters are coming." Ten days ago, the world went dark from an unknown cause. Civilization is starting to fall apart as generators fail and gas supplies started to diminish. Monsters of the darkness known as "Them" arrived, and now anyone who leaves the safety of light never returns.

Players know that the game will eventually end in darkness and the deaths of all characters. The purpose of the game is to create a shared narrative about their last bit of time together, and how they survived long enough to create their story.

=== Character generation ===
Characters have only four characteristics, which are written on index cards and stacked in front of each player: Virtue, Vice, A Moment, and A Brink. Players are given a Virtue and a Vice for their character by the players to their left and right respectively. They form their character based on these two traits, and then create A Moment — a situation or condition that would give their character hope. Then each player creates a Brink — a secret trait — for the player to their left in the form of a witness statement that starts "I've seen you..." The player sitting to the right of the gamemaster creates a single fact about "Them". As the story starts, character equipment is limited to whatever the player has on their physical person. Other equipment can be "found" if the narrative moves in that direction.

Nine votive candles are lit during various stages of character creation. As character creation ends, the tenth votive candle is lit. The game will last until there are no survivors or the last candle goes out.

=== Gameplay ===
Each game consists of up to ten scenes. If the outcome of a scene or event is unknown, it is resolved with the roll of a number of six-sided dice equal to the number of candles still burning. If any 1s are rolled, those dice are removed from the dice pool for the rest of that scene. If at least one 6 is rolled, the action was a success, and the scene continues. If no 6s are rolled, the action is a failure, a candle is blown out, a die is removed from the dice pool, and the scene is over. (If one or more candles go out on their own, the scene is immediately over and dice equal to the number of candles that went out are removed from the dice pool.)

After a failure, the gamemaster and the players each state one Truth to be added to the narrative, which cannot be later contradicted in the narrative.

After the dice are rolled, a player can use the top index card of the stack in front of them to try to influence the outcome. If the top card on their stack is a Virtue or Vice, all dice that were 1s are rerolled, and any dice that are not 1s the second time are returned to the dice pool. Any that are again rolled as 1s are lost. If the action that led to the original dice roll was a failure because no 6s were rolled the first time, a 6 rolled during this second attempt changes the failure to a success. Regardless, the Virtue or Vice is burned, losing that aspect of the character forever.

During play, the player might also be able to use their two other traits when a certain situation arises:

- A Moment: If the condition for that particular Moment has been met — for example, "I love the sound of laughter" might be triggered if there is laughter during the game — then the player can roll the available dice in the dice pool. A failure extinguishes another candle and the scene ends; but success gains the player a Hope die. This die is rolled by the owning player whenever they are rolling the dice pool to resolve a situation. Rolling a 5 or 6 on the Hope die results in success, and rolling a 1 does not remove the Hope die from play. Regardless of success or failure, the Moment card is burned.
- A Brink: Following a failure, a player can activate their Brink card if there is a situation analogous to the player's Brink. This allows them to reroll the dice pool to try to achieve a success. A success allows the player to keep their Brink card for reuse. Failure extinguishes a candle, and the player's Brink card is burned.

When there is only one candle left, failures do not extinguish it, but the gamemaster describes the way in which the character who failed dies. The only way to remain alive is to roll a 6 on the single remaining die. If there are any characters still alive when the final candle goes out, they all die as the monsters known as "Them" arrive with the enveloping darkness.

== Publication history ==
Ten Candles was designed by Stephen Dewey, and published as a 92-page softcover book by Cavalry Games with cover art by JC Park and interior art by Park, Stefan Harris, and Scout Wilkinson.

== Reception ==
On the Polygon website, Charlie Hall recommended Ten Candles for Halloween parties and compared its building tension to the game Dread.

Jess Weatherbed, writing for The Verge, recommended it as "the scariest experience I have had across any RPG."

Kam Burns, writing for Wired about the use of games in mental health care, discussed how a player's experience of Ten Candles helped them cope with mortality.

Rebekah Krum, writing for Comic Book Resources, listed Ten Candles as one of the ten most immersive tabletop games and one of ten RPGs perfect for the Halloween season.

Tim Clare, writing for Tabletop Gaming, named Ten Candles one of the top ten games for Halloween, commenting "As far as roleplaying survival horror goes, 10 Candles offers one of the best one-shot experiences [...] 10 Candles uses an interesting system where, yes, there’s a GM, but players co-create and hijack the narration.

In his 2023 book Monsters, Aliens, and Holes in the Ground, RPG historian Stu Horvath noted that the use of candles was "a central, and largely uncontrollable, game mechanic that represents the constant march (and cost) of time ... The march of time in Ten Candles isn't frantic, but it is inexorable — an errant draft could doom everyone." Horvath concluded, "In tandem with the game's character-based narrative tools, the fire serves to create emotionally rich stories about desperations and sacrifice. Then, all that's left is darkness."

== Awards ==
- At the 2015 Indie RPG Awards, Ten Candles was the runner-up for "Most Innovative Game"
- At the 2015 Golden Geek Awards, Ten Candles was a finalist in the category "RPG of the Year"
- At the 2016 ENNIE Awards Ten Candles was a finalist in four categories: "Best Game", "Best Rules", "Best Electronic Product", and "Product of the Year".
