= I'm Sorry Did You Say Street Magic =

City-building tabletop role-playing game

- Designers: Caro Asercion
- Illustrators: Shannon Kao
- Publication: 2019
- Players: 2–6

I'm Sorry Did You Say Street Magic (stylized in lowercase) is a city-building tabletop role-playing game created by Caro Asercion in 2019, based on the system in Microscope.

== Gameplay ==
Unlike most city building games, I'm Sorry Did You Say Street Magic specifically prohibits creating a map due to the historical connections between map-making and colonialism. In rounds, players take turns adding neighborhoods, landmarks, and residents by writing information on index cards. Rounds end with significant events to mark the passage of time. The game does not use a gamemaster.

== Publication history ==
Asercion self-published the digital edition of I'm Sorry Did You Say Street Magic on Itch.io in 2019 as an indie role-playing game. A print edition was released in 2020 after a Kickstarter campaign raised $21,379. It was part of Itch.io's 2023 Games for Gaza bundle, raising funds for the charity Medical Aid For Palestinians.

== Reception ==
Madison Durham for Polygon named I'm Sorry Did You Say Street Magic the best game she played in 2023, writing that, "It's a perfect game full stop, but especially for those seeking to rekindle their creativity." Chase Carter for Dicebreaker called it "evocative." Declan Lowthian for Comic Book Resources listed it as one of ten tabletop role-playing games with incredible art, praising the "surreal images blending the natural and the artificial to make for a landscape of dreamlike beauty."
