= Fanhunter, el juego de rol épicodecadente =

Spanish tabletop role playing game

Fanhunter
- Second edition cover (1993)
- Designers: Chema Pamundi
- Publishers: Gusa Comics/Farsa's Wagon
- Publication: 1992 (1st ed.); 1993 (2nd ed.)
- Genres: Comedy
- Systems: Custom

Fanhunter, el juego de rol épicodecadente (Spanish: Fanhunter, the epic decadent role-playing game) is a Spanish comedy role-playing game designed by Chema Pamundi, developed by Xavi Garriga, first edited by Cels Piñol in 1992 and set in the fictional universe created by Piñol under the name of Fanhunter. The first edition of the game, from 1992, was a self-edited publication made out of 500 photocopy-printed copies. The second edition, published in November 1993, was edited by the Farsa's Wagon publishing house.

== Supplements ==
- X-pansion Kit, Farsa's Wagon, Barcelona, May 1994, ISBN 84-95583-02-X
- Operación Anhilite, Farsa's Wagon, Barcelona, November 1994, ISBN 84-95583-05-4
- La Guia de Barnacity, Farsa's Wagon, Barcelona, May 1994, ISBN 84-95583-04-6
- BNC Tales, Farsa's Wagon, Barcelona, May 1997, ISBN 84-95583-03-8
- Spanish Show 1ª Parte, Farsa's Wagon, Barcelona, March 2000, ISBN 84-95583-07-0
- Spanish Show 2ª Parte, Farsa's Wagon, Barcelona, July 2000, ISBN 84-95583-06-2
- Spanish Show 3ª Parte, Farsa's Wagon, Barcelona, September 2001, ISBN 84-95583-11-9

== Spinoffs ==
- Fanpiro (2001)
- Outfan (2002)

== See also ==
- Fanhunter
