= Witch Hunt (role-playing game) =

Role-playing games supplement

Cover art: Detail from The Trial of George Jacobs by T. H. Matteson

Witch Hunt is a role-playing game published by StatCom Simulations Inc. in 1983 that is set in the time of the 1692 Salem Witch Trials. Unusually for a role-playing game, the players are divided into two teams.

== Description ==
Witch Hunt is a historical/horror system set in Salem, Massachusetts in 1692 during the time of the infamous Witch Trials.

A player creates a character by rolling percentile dice ten times, then applying the results to the character's attributes. The player then distributes a further 30 points to the attributes. The height and weight of the character are also determined randomly, was well as social status, marital status, family (if any) and occupation.

Although in most role-playing games the player characters work cooperatively to achieve their goals, in Witch Hunt the characters are divided into two teams:

- The witches, who work in secret, have magical powers and can cast spells such as Withering, Tanglefoot, Storm, Curse, and Pole Riding (which are the actual spells "witches" were accused of using during the historical Witch Trials).
- The magistrates, who are determined gather enough evidence to bring the witches to trial. The magistrates can interview suspected witches, search for evidence, and use a special device called the Staff of Law that can detect magical auras when spells are used.

The game is divided into Search, Arrest, Interrogation, and Trial. The rules provide the legal framework for the magistrates to prove their accusations, while giving the witches room to evade the charges.

Victory points can be awarded to individual players for discovering incriminating evidence and issuing arrest warrants (for the magistrates), and eluding arrest and causing trouble (for the witches.)

The gamemaster, acting as the town crier, can put forth rumors, announcements and proclamations.

The game also provides historical background and life in a Puritan community, and includes an introductory miniscenario, "The Shadow of the Dark Man", which based on a historical incident.

== Publication history ==
Witch Hunt was designed by Paul D. Baader and Roger Buckelew, and published by StatCom Simulations in 1983 as a boxed set. The cover of the box features detail from the 1853 painting The Trial of George Jacobs by T. H. Matteson. The box contains the 48-page rulebook, a black-and-white map of Salem, a blank double-sided character sheet, and two small twenty-sided dice from Gamescience.

The only supplement published for Witch Hunt was the 1984 adventure A Tyme of Darkness.

== Reception ==
In Issue 61 of White Dwarf, Jon Sutherland commented, "The major concern is that if it is the witches's part to evade capture and confound and prey on the others it becomes increasingly apparent to me that the whole structure of the game falls down at this crucial point, given that the players are either law-abiding citizens or witches." Sutherland concluded by giving the game a poor overall score of only 5 out of 10, saying, "Witch Hunt is interesting in a limited way, in fact 'limited' is a good word to sum the game up. There are precious few innovations in evidence and I couldn't imagine players wanting to bother playing it more than once or twice. It is neither 'realistic' nor comprehensive enough to merit recommendation." Sutherland concludes the review by saying: "

In Issue 5 of Fantasy Gamer, G.D. Swick liked the production values, finding the map "quite functional", the character sheet "well thought out", and the rulebook filled with "professional-looking illustrations." Swick noted a few problems with the rules as well as a few typos, but found the rules "easy to digest" and noted "Players should, however, be made aware of the weaknesses within the system and be prepared to work things out in an amicable fashion." Swick concluded on a positive note, saying, "The Witch Hunt rules require some fine tuning but they give GMs and players a solid base with which to work. This is an innovative game, but most importantly, it is downright fun — well worth the $10.00 price tag. ... Give Witch Hunt a try — you may get hung up on it."

Sandy Petersen reviewed Witch Hunt for Different Worlds magazine and stated that "Summing up, Witch Hunt is eccentric. It might be good for a laugh and even a short campaign. The information it does include on the time of the witch trials makes it a useful supplement to such games as Call Of Cthulhu. If you do not play Cthulhu or some other game in which Witch Hunt's background, spell lists, maps, and floor plans would eventually become useful, I cannot recommend Witch Hunt. But otherwise, it's not a bad purchase."

In his 1990 book The Complete Guide to Role-Playing Games, game critic Rick Swan called Witch Hunt "A forgotten gem ... a fascinating concept, superbly executed." Swan thought the rules handling the legal showdown were "ingenious". Swan found the game was "laced with humor, which prevents the proceedings from becoming too grim." Swan also called the single published adventure, A Tyme of Darkness, "an interesting adventure that expands the scope of the game and clarifies some of its murkier concepts." Swan concluded by giving this game a solid rating of 3 out of 4, noting however that the game was out of print.

In his 1991 book Heroic Worlds, Lawrence Schick commented, "This is a strange one."
