= 9th Generation =

Tabletop role-playing game

- Designers: Jeff Siadek
- Publishers: Jeff Siadek Enterprises
- Publication: 1986; 39 years ago
- Genres: Science fiction Role-playing game
- Playing time: Varies
- Chance: Dice rolling

9th Generation is a role-playing game published by Jeff Siadek Enterprises in 1986.

== Description ==
9th Generation is a post-holocaust system of "savage violence, humorously written". The game includes three books: Characters and Combat (36 pages), Game-Master's Guide (16 pages), and an introductory scenario, Desert Ninja, plus a GM's screen.

== Publication history ==
9th Generation was designed by Jeff Siadek, and published by Jeff Siadek Enterprises in 1986 as a 36-page book, a 16-page book, and a 6-page book in an outer folder, a sample character sheet, a cardstock screen, and an outer folder.
