= Fuzzy Heroes =

Fuzzy Heroes is a miniatures wargame published by Inner City Games Designs in 1992 that features combat between plush toys and plastic toys.

Cover art by Jon Niccum, 1992

== Gameplay ==
The book sets out rules for battles between plush toys — the Fuzzy Heroes — and hard plastic heroes — the Renegade Boy Toys. Players should be able to find all the components needed to play in their house: 6-sided dice, a ruler or tape measure, terrain made from pillows and clothes, and the plush and plastic toys themselves.

A fictional history of FrolicHaven is included to explain why the plushies are at war with the plastic toys.

The book also includes an adventure scenario — "They've Kidnapped Santa" — to add an element of role-playing to the miniatures combat.

=== Setup ===
The players build a "terrain" on any suitable surface using clothing and pillows.

=== Character generation ===
Each toy is given points in six abilities — Energy Points, Defensive Classification, Movement Allowance, Energy Dice and Terrain Effects — based on its actual physical size, characteristics and color.

=== Movement ===
Each toy can move its rated Movement Allowance minus the effect of terrain.

=== Combat ===
If a toy is within 6 inches of its target it can attack. For each of its attacks, the player rolls three 6-sided dice. If the total exceeds the defender's Defensive Classification, then the attacker rolls its Energy Dice for damage. If the damage exceeds the target's Energy Points, the target falls asleep and becomes a terrain obstacle.

=== Advanced rules ===
There are several optional advanced rules that cover vehicles, climbing, retreating, fatigues, morale, special attacks, weapon use, and armor.

== Publication history ==
Fuzzy Heroes is an 80-page perfect-bound softcover book designed by Christopher Clark, with illustrations by Jon Niccum, and published by Inner City Games Designs in 1992. The following year, Inner City published a sequel, Fuzzy Sooper Heroes.

They later published another supplement called The Lost Toys.

== Reception ==
Sean Holland reviewed Fuzzy Heroes in White Wolf #45 (July, 1994), rating it a 4 out of 5 for children, and 2 out of 5 for adults, and stated that "I gave Fuzzy Heroes a split value. The higher is for those of you who want (or have to) introduce children to the art of gaming. The other is for the rest of us who, while we might find the concept enjoyable, are unlikely to play the game more than once or twice."

In the April 1995 edition of Dragon (Issue #216), Spike Jones called the book "the least expensive miniatures game you'll ever come across" since all the materials could be found in the average household. Jones found the rules "simple and quite readable (although the text does suffer from typo problems.)" He criticized the history of the FrolicHaven war as "filler". Nonetheless, Jones thought this game could be a good introduction to the principles of miniatures wargaming for novices, and even a good way for a grandparent or parent to share their love of miniatures combat with children. He concluded by giving the book an average rating of 4 out of 6, saying, "The Fuzzy Heroes game makes for a good, inexpensive, and fun game that 'can be enjoyed by the whole family' (as the book's back cover puts it)."
