= Hunter Planet =

Tabletop role-playing game

Hunter Planet, subtitled "The All Australian Role Playing Game," is a humorous role-playing game published by H-PAC (Hunter Planet Adventurers Club) in 1986.

== Description ==
The players take on the role of aliens who have travelled to Earth to go on safari and hunt the unintelligent humans that inhabit the planet. The alien tourists arrive with shoddy or non-functioning equipment and quickly learn that the humans fight back. The role-playing rules are minimal. The boxed set contains:

- 32-page rule book
- 32-page adventure Welcome to Sindee: An Australian Adventure
- 16-page expansion module "Exile & Arena: Hunter Planet Possibilities"
- 25-page pad of character sheets
- cover sheet listing the contents
- glossy cardstock folder to hold contents that can be used as a gamemaster's screen

== Publication history ==
Hunter Planet was designed by Dave Bruggeman, and published by H-PAC in 1986, the first role-playing game to be created and published in Australia. The following year, Bruggeman created a slightly revised second edition called The Hunter Planet Executive Pack.

== Reception ==
In the July–August 1988 edition of Casus Belli (Issue #46), Frédéric Blayo was less than enthusiastic, saying, "The game is meant to be funny but unfortunately the reality leaves something to be desired." Blayo thought the rules erred on the side of being too simple, noting that without any means to resolve skill challenges, "The success of the characters' actions are determined arbitrarily by the gamemaster." He also commented that "Nothing is indicated about the different races that the players have to embody; it's up to them to invent them!" In the end, Blayo thought the game was based on a single joke, saying, "The very theme of the game is quite repetitive, and you tire of it very quickly. It's a shame, because it could have been a lot more inventive and humorous. As it is, it's very poor. Avoid!"

In Issue 28 of the Australian game magazine Queensland Wargamer, Timo Nieminen liked the game, calling it "SF role-playing at its best." Nieminen admitted that "much of the game system is 'do what you feel is right', and that "a genuine long term campaign with features such as character continuity may be difficult." However, Nieminen concluded that the game would be very good for conventions and one-shot playing opportunities.

== See also ==
- TWERPS
