= Microscope (role-playing game) =

Tabletop role-playing game

- Designers: Ben Robbins
- Publishers: Lame Mage Productions
- Publication: 2011

Microscope is an indie role-playing game in which players create a fictional historical timeline, then zoom in to role-play specific events on that timeline. It was designed by Ben Robbins and released by Lame Mage Productions in 2011.

== Description ==
Microscope is a role-playing game with no gamemaster and requiring no preparation time. Players first collaboratively create a fictional timeline with a start and end point.

Once the segment of timeline has been set, players take turns focusing on specific points on the timeline, adding details of events and personalities. At this point, the rules forbid players from contradicting anything that has already been said, and players cannot collude.

Once these details have been set, the players can zoom in on a specific event in the timeline and collaboratively roleplay a given scene.

Game historian Stu Horvath uses the example of the timeline being a king's reign starting with his ascension to the throne and ending in his death. One player might create an event on that timeline about a mad knight murdering some people. Another player might add another event following that on the timeline to illustrate how the knight's madness affected the kingdom, or a preceding event on the timeline foretelling of the madness. The players could then possibly choose to zoom in on the day of madness and roleplay events of the day.

== Publication history ==
Ben Robbins designed Microscope, which was published by Lame Mage Productions in 2011 as an 80-page softcover book. Later in the decade, the game was translated into several languages including Italian (Microscopi, Space Orange 42, 2019), Catalan (Microscopi, Maqui Editions, 2020), and German (Microscope, Uhrwerk Verlag, 2020).

== Reception ==
Writing for Boing Boing, Katherine Cross commented, "The game forces you to answer that crucial question, why, again and again, and this is where it chisels away at tropes. When you ask why [...] you'll at the very least produce a much more interesting setting." Cross concluded, "It's the perfect setting-creator and a brilliant way to democratise setting creation in games that involve GMs. It is specifically designed to draw on the particularities of each player's creativity, while also taking consent seriously."

In his 2023 book Monsters, Aliens, and Holes in the Ground, RPG historian Stu Horvath noted, "Microscope takes on massively complicated concepts, like time and history, and provides elegant rules for navigating them in a way that is both thought provoking and fun." Horvath concluded, "It didn't seem possible for the mechanics to be so simple and versatile, nor did it seem that an elaborate timeline could give way to stories that surprised everyone at the table. Yet that's exactly what Microscope does."

== Awards ==
At the 2016 Indie RPG Award, the supplement Microscope Explorer won in the category "Indie Supplement of the Year".

== Legacy ==
Microscope inspired the game mechanics of subsequent worldbuilding role-playing games, including I'm Sorry Did You Say Street Magic.
