= Dinky Dungeons =

Tabletop role-playing game

Dinky Dungeons is a role-playing game published by Doc's Games in 1985.

== Description ==
Dinky Dungeons is the smallest (3 in × 4 in (76 mm × 102 mm)) role-playing game ever produced. The very concise rules cover character creation, classes, skills, spells, combat, experience, monsters, and a two-page introductory mini-scenario. The game includes a GM's screen, a hex map, and a sample character sheet.

The game utilized six-sided dice (d6 in game parlance). Each character had two attributes, Mental and Physical. There were three classes – fighter, wizard, and bard – and three optional non-human races – elves, dwarves, and "Fuzzy-Winkers", the latter of which being intelligent, giant rats. The Physical trait governed the size of weapon the fighter could use, which in turn determined how much damage the character could do on a good roll. Mental governed a wizard or bard's spell points and the number of spells they had at their disposal.

Conflict resolution was handled by rolling 2d6 and trying to get X or less, where X was the difficulty of a task set by the GM or by a chart that compared the attacker and defender's relative abilities. Where abilities were matched, the player needed to roll a 7 or less for his or her character to succeed.

Rights to the game currently reside with the illustrator, Phil Morrissey, who is planning on a re-release.

== Publication history ==
Dinky Dungeons was designed by Denton R. Elliott and published by Doc's Games in 1985 as a 32-page book, a cardstock screen, a cardstock sheet, a character sheet, a map, and dice.

Doc's Games published additional material for the game in 1985, including the supplement Dinky Kingdom and several adventures: Berzerko Tower / Doc's Maze, Blades of Boardum!, Lost Tomb of Antigorne / Sacrifice to the Blood Diety, Siege Wheel of the Blue Goblins, and Troll Canyon.

Shannon Appelcline noted that while the name of TWERPS was a parody of GURPS, "TWERPS was influenced more by a tiny self-published game called Dinky Dungeons (1985). After reading that 32-page fantasy RPG, Dee wanted to see just how small an RPG could be. He bettered Dinky Dungeon's three stats with a mere one stat for TWERPS." Appelcline also identified the game as one of "the best examples of the backlash against complexity" in RPGs.
