= Quest (role-playing game) =

Tabletop role-playing game

- Designers: T.C. Sottek
- Illustrators: Marianna Learmonth, Celia Lowenthal, Grim Wilkins
- Publishers: The Adventure Guild
- Publication: 2019
- Genres: tabletop role-playing game, fantasy
- Website: adventure.game

Quest is a rules-light, fantasy tabletop role-playing game designed to welcome beginners to the hobby. It was created in 2019 by T.C. Sottek, executive editor at The Verge. It was published by Sottek's indie publishing company, the Adventure Guild, after a Kickstarter campaign raised $153,614. Quest was nominated for the 2020 ENnie Awards in four categories. Since 2022, the digital edition of Quest has been available for free. Other creators are allowed to make and sell products based on Quest.

== Gameplay ==
Quest uses a quick character creation system based on answering simple, Mad Libs-style questions. Players roll a single 20-sided die to address challenges. The gamemaster is called the Guide.

== Publication history ==
Quest was first published in 2019. In response to the COVID-19 lockdowns in 2020, the Adventure Guild announced that physical copies of the core rulebook could be ordered by libraries, public schools, and counsellors free of charge. Later that year, an audio tutorial was released. In 2021, the expansions Fantastic Characters and Wondrous Treasures were released after a Kickstarter campaign raised $53,473. In 2022, the digital edition of Quest became available for free download.

Third-party creators are permitted to make and sell products based on Quest using the game's Community Creators Resource, which was published under a Creative Commons license.

== Reception ==
Quest was nominated for the 2020 ENnie Awards in four categories: "Product of the Year," "Best Family Game / Product," "Best Layout and Design," and "Best Writing."

Several actual play podcasts and web series have used Quest as their game system. The Asians Represent show on One Shot Podcast Network switched their "Dungeons & Da Asians" campaign system from Dungeons & Dragons to Quest in July 2020.

Beth Elderkin for Gizmodo praised Quest's decision to make the core rulebook available to schools during the COVID-19 lockdowns, writing, "It's a welcoming, positive, and (dare I say) educational roleplaying game, and seems like a great way to bring educators and students together during a difficult time."

Several reviewers noted that Quest was beginner-friendly. Charlie Hall for Polygon wrote that Quest "has been custom-made for people who are new to these sorts of games." Meaghan Colleran for Bell of Lost Souls called Quest "easy to jump into, easy to learn, easy to play and easy to GM. It's a perfect game for kids or beginners."

Aaron Marks for Cannibal Halfling Games called Quest's "layout and document design" "superior" to that of typical role-playing games. However, he dismissed one of Sottek's early design goals – to "overtake D&D" – writing, "I can say Quest isn't going to upend any existing hierarchy [...] That said, one need not start any revolutions to be successful."
