= What Price Glory?! =

Role-playing game

What Price Glory?! is a role-playing game published by James Lauffenburger in 1978.

== Description ==
What Price Glory?! is a fantasy system, basically a variant of Original D&D, with a hex-grid position-based combat system and a spell-point system for magic.

== Publication history ==
What Price Glory?! was designed by John Dankert and Jim Lauffenburger, and published by James Lauffenburger in 1978 as a 140-page digest-sized book. The print run was 500 copies, of which 300 were distributed by Gamescience. Artwork was performed by Thomas E. Sprimont. In 2022, the intellectual property rights of What Price Glory was acquired by Precis Intermedia and a classic reprint has been published.
