= Dread (role-playing game) =

Tabletop horror role-playing game

- Cover art by Christy Schaefer
- Designers: Epidiah Ravachol; Nathaniel Barmore
- Publishers: The Impossible Dream
- Publication: 2005
- Genres: Indie
- Systems: custom

Dread is a horror indie tabletop role-playing game designed by Epidiah Ravachol and Nathaniel Barmore, and published by The Impossible Dream in 2006. The game is unusual in that it uses a Jenga tower for action resolution. It won three ENNIE Awards.

== The game ==
Dread is a short (one session) horror role-playing game. In addition to the book of rules, players also need to have a Jenga tower (not supplied with the game), which takes the place of dice for action resolution.

Dread has no fixed setting and can be used in any place or time in which a horror game is appropriate.

=== Character creation ===
The Host (gamemaster) designs a questionnaire of 10–12 questions, the last question being "What is your character's name?" The Host then uses the answers to assign each player to a stock role, such as Jock, Head Cheerleader, Nerd, Slacker, Rich Kid, and Best Friend.

=== Gameplay ===
Before play begins, the Jenga tower is set up. During play, when a character attempts to do a difficult task, the player is required to pull out a Jenga block. Doing so successfully means the character was successful. Failure usually indicates that the character dies, and the player is out of the game. As the game progresses, each successive block pull becomes more difficult, increasing the suspense.

The expectation is that most, if not all characters, will not survive to the end of the adventure.

The rule book comes with several sample adventures: Beneath A Full Moon - survival horror, Beneath A Metal Sky - science fiction, and Beneath The Mask (based on a slasher film in which not even the GM knows which of the PCs is the killer at the start.)

== Publication history ==
Dread was designed by Epidiah Ravachol and Nathaniel Barmore and published by The Impossible Dream in 2006 as a 168-page softcover book with cover art by Christy Schaefer and interior art by Jill Krynicki and Taylor Winder. The game was also translated into several other languages and published by Kalandhorizont Könyvek (Hungarian), MS Edizioni (Italian), and System Matters Verlag (German).

In May 2015, Dread was featured as a two-part episode on TableTop. Wil Wheaton praised Dread's "very innovative device to build up tension and really put the scare in players".

In March 2019, Dread and its creator Epidiah Ravachol were featured on the ProudGamers podcast, The ProudTable, and Epidiah spoke about his inspirations behind the game.

Dread's use of a Jenga tower to heighten narrative tension in a role-playing game later inspired the same game mechanic in the romance game Star Crossed by Alex Roberts, which won a Diana Jones Award.

Dread has also been played on the Smosh Games channel as a 10 part series, Smosh vs Dread (2024-2025) -See part one: Jenga Decides Our Fate | Smosh vs. Zombies Episode 1- and a live streamed stage show, Were All Gonna Die (2025) both hosted by professional game master and story teller George Primavera.

== Reception ==
Charlie Hall for Polygon called the game "remarkable" and pointed out similar rising tension in Dread and Ten Candles. Ian Williams for Vice pointed out that "the game, the mood, and the rules which demand you pick up blocks" work together to create the "tension of dramatic moments". Connor Hogg for GameRant called Dread a "beautifully unique RPG system" and recommended it for "a slasher one-shot session or a horror-themed campaign."

Writing for Play Unplugged, Paul Carboni commented, "Dread's flexibility is a product of its simple and surprisingly innovative character creation and conflict resolution systems." Carboni noted the build-up of suspense, writing, "Dread manages to quickly and effectively imbue your character’s actions with potentially lethal suspense. And oh man does it work. As the Tower gets taller, the situation steadily grows more dire. Actions become more desperate as death looms ever near. Pulling a block from a Jenga tower may just end up being one of the most stressful things you do in your life." Although Carboni didn't like the one-shot nature of the game, he concluded, "Dread is an extremely appealing game, if you like horror and don’t mind its short story arc. It is also a great way to ease new roleplayers into the more complicated world of most RPG’s, and for more experienced players it offers a whole new flavor of play style."

In his 2023 book Monsters, Aliens, and Holes in the Ground, RPG historian Stu Horvath commented, "Is the Jenga tower a gimmick? Absolutely. But it's one that actually works. RPGs so rarely have physical stakes presented at the gaming table. By tying success and failure to something so precarious as a Jenga tower, Dread introduces very real, very terrifying causes and effects for players to navigate." Horvath did note that the game has shortcomings, including its one-shot nature, and that players are required to instantly improvise, which can cause freeze-up. But Horvath concluded, "the fact that players are almost guaranteed, by design, to have physical manifestations of fear is an achievement that makes up for nearly any deficiency. Horror at the game table is challenging to concoct, but Dread makes it seem easy."

== Awards ==
At the 2006 ENnie Awards, Dread was awarded the Gold medal in the category "Innovation". It also received Silver medals in the categories "Best Game" and "Best Rules."
