= Hidden Kingdom (role-playing game) =

- Publishers: New Rules Inc.
- Years active: 1985
- Genres: Fantasy

Hidden Kingdom is a role-playing game published by New Rules Inc. in 1985.

== Description ==
Hidden Kingdom: A Fantasy-Adventure Game is a fantasy system set in Arthurian times, combining role-playing with strategic conflict and historical simulation. Character alignment is based on the religious and political conflicts of the time. To be truly successful, a player character must follow the rules of Christian knightly conduct. The game includes statistics for over 300 historically based characters, plus a GM's screen.

Players are assigned a character and play out that character using the character's given beliefs and values (alignment). The game includes two full color maps of ancient Britain, including Ireland, featuring twenty-one different kingdoms on the islands and hundreds of small baronages. Heraldry is defined for every single character in the game with detailed shields and surcoats. The game also includes political and economic rules as well as general roleplaying. It can be played as a single session, or as a continuous multi-session campaign.

== Publication history ==
Hidden Kingdom was designed by Jon McClenahan, Stan Dokupil, and Gene Riemenschneider, with art by Paula Lamb. It was published by New Rules Inc. in 1985 as a deluxe slipcased binder with 337 loose-leaf pages, two maps, character sheets, a cardstock screen, and dice.

In 2015, Fun Quest Games acquired the rights to Hidden Kingdom, and published a 30th anniversary printing.

== Reception ==
In the December-January 1987 edition of White Wolf (Issue 8), Stewart Wieck rated the game 3 out of 5 stars, citing the high price as a downside.

In the May 1988 edition of Dragon (Issue 133), Ken Rolston thought the depth of content overcame the high purchase price. "Hidden Kingdom contains a wealth of detail and scenario ideas for an Arthurian campaign. The encounters section alone should provide enough Arthurian adventure ideas for a lifetime. The two full-color hex maps of Arthur’s Britain are also very attractive. The hefty price tag may discourage the casual purchaser, but Arthurian fans and collectors should be quite pleased with this purchase."
