= Ganghedge Manifesto =

Ganghedge Manifesto is a 1990 role-playing supplement for Ironhedge published by Empire Wargames.

== Contents ==
Ganghedge Manifesto is a supplement in which rules for gang wars in the inner-city are detailed.

== Publication history ==
Ganghedge Manifesto was written by John Brooke, and was published by Empire Wargames in 1990 as a small 16-page booklet with a character card.

== Reception ==
Allen Mixson reviewed Ganghedge in White Wolf #30 (Feb., 1992), rating it a 3 out of 5 and stated that "Whether used as a continuation of the Ironhedge multiverse or a corner of your own gameworld, this is a neat little package."
