= Precis Intermedia Gaming =

Role-playing game company

Precis Intermedia
- Industry: Role-playing
- Headquarters: USA
- Products: Two-Fisted Tales, Iron Gauntlets, EarthAD.2, Hardnova, Coyote Trail, Disposable Heroes, Active Exploits, Genre Diversion, Story Engine, Atomik Generic Add-ons, Wee Warriors
- Website: www.pigames.net

Precis Intermedia (formerly Politically Incorrect Games and Spectre Press) publishes downloadable PDF-based and traditional printed role-playing games. They also publish downloadable paper gaming miniatures called Disposable Heroes, and other various miniatures and tabletop games. Precis Intermedia merged with Spectre Press, one of the first RPG publishers to offer PDF-based products on the internet.

== Games and products ==
Precis Intermedia has brought back a number of previously out-of-print games, including Shatterzone, Masterbook, Bloodshadows, Darkwood, Supergame, Maelstrom Storytelling, and A Fistfull of Miniatures. The company has also published its share of original roleplaying and tabletop games, including Treasure Awaits!, HardNova 2, Ghostories, EarthAD.2, Two-Fisted Tales, Lord of Olympus, Active Exploits Diceless Roleplaying, Warcosm, and Brutes. Other notable products include Disposable Heroes Paper Miniatures, The Amazing 8in1 Die, Exiled in Eris, and Eldritch Ass Kicking.

== Hubris Games ==
Hubris Games was a publisher of traditional printed role-playing games based in San Francisco from 1996 to 2000. They were pioneers in the advent of story-based role-playing games. with a strong presence at game conventions including Gen Con and Origins Game Fair.

== Games and products ==
The main game setting was Maelstrom Storytelling, written by Christian Aldridge and Seth Lindberg. Supporting titles included Tales from the Empire, Dacartha Prime, and the Book of Gray. The universal version of the rules was published as Story Engine. Hubris Games was also the original publisher of the popular beer & pretzels RPG Kobolds Ate My Baby!. Maelstrom Storytelling and Story Engine are currently published by Precis Intermedia Gaming.
