= Mechanical Dream =

Tabletop role-playing game

- Mechanical Dream cover
- Designers: Francis Larose, Benjamin Paquette
- Publishers: SteamLogic
- Publication: 2002
- Genres: Fantasy
- Systems: Custom (Absolute Judge)

Mechanical Dream is an alternate world fantasy role-playing game published by SteamLogic in 2002. After the company went bankrupt, the game designers founded their own company, SteamLogic Editions, to continue publishing.

== Description ==
The core rulebook for Mechnical Dream is split into two separate books, printed back to back. The first, titled Dream Side, is an introduction to the world. The second book, titled "introduces the game system, character creation, equipment, and other details of playing the game.

Mechanical Dream is set on the disk-shaped world of Kaïnas, lit by a sun-like orb called the Pendulum. A dream world called Naakinis overlaps Kaïnas and comes into being at night. The edge of the world is surrounded by a tall (40-mile-high) wall called the Sofe.

Most inhabitants consume orpee fruit to survive, which naturally concentrates a life-force called "eflow" that fuels life -- without it, death is quick and painful. The politics and economics of Kaïnas are primarily driven by the collection and distribution of orpee.

Player characters are called "Echoes", and are able to harness eflow to produce miraculous effect using their "Gifts." They are also able to gain information and insight through a "Whisper," the so-called voice of eflow that speaks to each Echo. There are ten different "vocations" for Echoes that delineate their personalities and abilities, and ten different indigenous races to choose from.

== Publication history ==
Mechanical Dream was created by Canadian game designers Francis Larose & Benjamin Paquette. Larose later wrote that the idea for the world came to him in a dream and he started working on a role-playing game the same day.The result was Mechanical Dream: The Core's Crusade, a 366-page hardcover book published in 2002 by SteamLogic. An adventure, Thirteenth Wheel, and a 112-page bestiary titled Wilderness followed in 2003.

When SteamLogic folded in 2004, Larose and Paquette started a new company under the name SteamLogic Editions.

== Reception ==
In Issue 14 of Fictional Reality, Calvin Daniels found the setting fascinating, since "The world, its inhabitants, and even the ecology of the world and influences of light and darkness are freshly chiseled in this intriguing new entry into RP [role-playing] Gaming." Daniels found the artwork of the rulebook "startlingly beautiful" with "an almost surreal feel which is ideal for a game that seems to waver at times on the edge of our conscious and our unconscious." Daniels only found one flaw: "If there is a drawback to the game, it is the same as its strength, the unfamiliarity of the entire world. One doesn't grasp the intricacies of a more than 300 pages of game rules, guidelines and mechanics for MD in a simple browsing, or even a single detailed reading of the text." Despite this Daniels concluded, "Yet, for those who do take the time to try something out of the ordinary, the possibility of being awestruck in an amazing world of shadow and light certainly exists."

In Issue 46 of the French games magazine Backstab, Gaetan Botherel reviewed both the adventure The Thirteenth Wheel and the bestiary Wilderness. Of the adventure, Bothorel noted that "The beautifully illustrated book is as much a background supplement as a scenario." Bothorell called the scenario "high quality" and concluded, "This supplement is a must-have and deserves your full attention." Commenting on the bestiary, Bothorel wrote, "The sections devoted to creatures, fauna, and flora are entirely in color, which represents more than half of the book (and explains its price). But the content of the book is much richer than that of a simple bestiary."

== Reviews ==
- Realms of Fantasy
