= Fate of the Norns =

Viking fantasy role-playing games

- Fate of the Norns: Ragnarok, Second Edition as published by Pendelhaven in 2013. Illustration by Helena Rosova
- Designers: Andrew Valkauskas
- Publishers: Pendelhaven
- Publication: 1993 (FOTN, First Edition); 2002 (FOTN, Second Edition); 2006 (FOTN:R, First Edition); 2012 (FOTN:R, Second Edition)
- Genres: Fantasy
- Systems: Rune Tiles; previous editions without the "Ragnarok" qualifier used 2D10/D100 percentile dice.

Fate of the Norns is a series of Viking fantasy role-playing games first published in 1993 by Pendelhaven. It was created by Andrew Valkauskas. The game uses an experience point system and afterlife mechanics rooted in Norse mythology.

Several different editions and supplements have been published in digital form since the game’s initial release. Print versions of a few core products became available in 2012.

== Fate of the Norns: Ragnarok and the RGS ==
The most recent editions, starting with 2006's Fate of the Norns: Ragnarok, replace earlier editions' dice-based skill checks and combat mechanics with a new system based on Elder Futhark Runes. Newer editions also feature more of a supernatural focus than previous editions, in part due to the change of premise from the conflicts between Aesir and Vanir to the unraveling of the Nordic end times (the Ragnarok). In both editions of Fate of the Norns: Ragnarok, characters must die in order to progress past a certain point. Character sheets include information about their legacy from previous lives.

== Game Summary ==
Legend has it that during every man’s birth, the three Norns come to discuss his destiny and time of death. When they decide that man’s fate, no mortal or deity may change the course of the future. It is said that even Ragnarok, the twilight of the Gods, was determined by the Norns.

== History ==
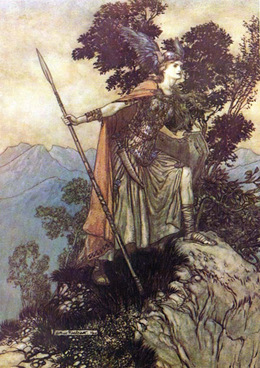
Fate of the Norns was initially published in 1993 with this 1912 illustration by Arthur Rackham as its cover.

=== Fate of the Norns, first edition (1993-2013) ===
The first edition of Fate of the Norns (ISBN 978-098654140-7) achieved viral internet distribution in the late 1990s via a free PDF demo. This PDF was a shorter version of the full game, with 80 pages as opposed to the full product's 320. The game contained 6 types of distinct magic (independent systems) and over 35 occupations. The timing system in the game was also unique in the industry, assigning speed factors for every action, and staggering all actions based on those segment offsets.

This edition was published as a printed product in 2012 and retired in late 2013.

=== Fate of the Norns, second edition (2002) ===
The second edition of Fate of the Norns (ISBN 978-098654142-1) implemented an evolution of the game engine incorporating RPG industry trends. With the advent of MMORPGs and combat evolving into more than a roll-to-hit and roll-for-damage model, the game engine incorporated a myriad of special maneuvers, supplying players with a colorful repertoire of actions during combat. This eliminated the classic RPG combat grid. The character progression also changed from linear to distributed. Rather than using a linear skill tree, the character skills would evolve over several "chess boards" of skills and abilities.

It also emphasized the historical background and introduced the theme of the Aesir-Vanir war.

This edition has never been published as a print product, making it less accessible to the public than the first edition (which was readily available to buy both in PDF and hardcover forms during much of 2012 and all of 2013).

=== Fate of the Norns: Ragnarok (2005-2006) ===
Fate of the Norns: Ragnarok RPG, First Edition, published in 2006. First version of the RGS rules.

Fate of the Norns: Ragnarok (ISBN 978-098654141-4) was a new game in terms of setting and mechanics. No longer using dice, it introduced what is now known as the first version of the Runic Game System (RGS), which used Elder Futhark runes. The game takes place during the final war between the gods and the giants, allowing players to play supernatural beings such as Einherjar and Valkyries.

This edition has never been published in print form and may be difficult to find.

"The Twilight of the gods nears,

Brother will kill brother,

Families sundered by incest,

Four ages afoot,

An Axe Age, A Sword Age,

Where shields are cloven,

A Wind Age, A Wolf Age,

Where the world falls,

No one shall be spared...

--Voluspa"

=== Fate of the Norns: Ragnarok, second edition (20th Anniversary Edition) (2012-2013) ===
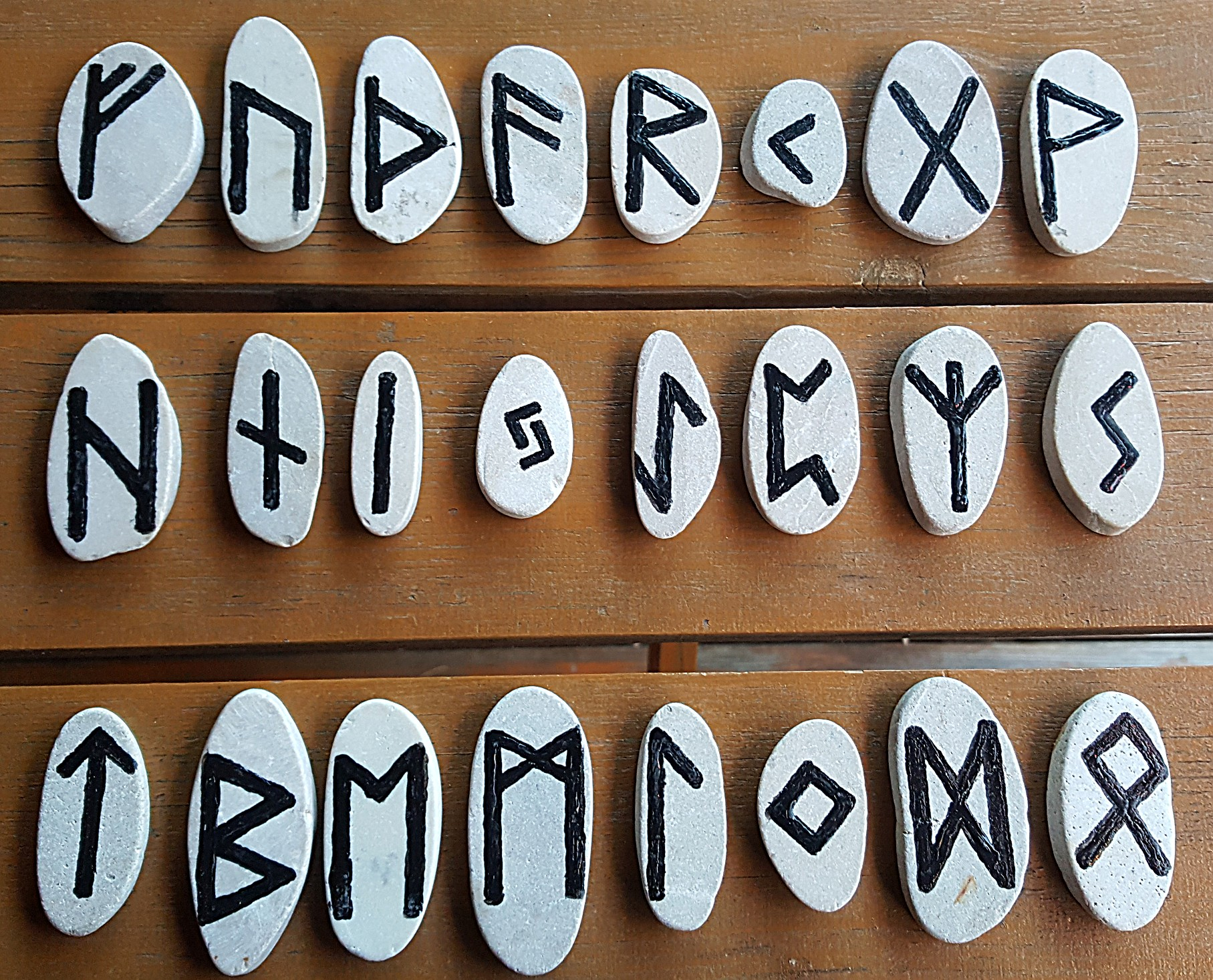
Runes of the Elder Futhark

Fate of the Norns: Ragnarok Second Edition (ISBN 978-098654143-8), also known as the Twentieth Anniversary Edition, was the result of a Kickstarter project. It changed the game mechanics once more, while keeping the Ragnarok theme and scenarios. The Runic Game System (RGS) was updated and made use of an additional rune, the 'Void rune', not found in regular Elder Futhark rune sets. Weapon meta tags are added to give weapons their own style of play (blunt weapons knock down, pierce weapons cause bleeding, etc.). Three distinct Wounds tracks have been added to the playmat, allowing groups to customize the lethality level of their campaigns.

=== Fate of the Norns: Fafnir's Treasure ===
"Fafnir's Treasure" is a beginner's journey into the world of Fate of the Norns, intended to introduce new players to Norse mythology and the unique mechanics of game play in Fate of the Norns. The self-contained adventure is highly recommended by a number of RPG players and has been updated and re-released in late 2012 (ISBN 978-098654145-2) updated to the rules of the 20th Anniversary Edition.

== Distribution ==
From 1993 until mid-2012, all Fate of the Norns products were sold only as digital products. A hardcover of the original 1993 Fate of the Norns (first edition) was published in mid-2012. A Kickstarter project for the new edition of the core rules, Fate of the Norns: Ragnarok 20th Anniversary Edition began in August 2012. A printed re-release of the quick-start module "Fafnir's Treasure" followed shortly in late 2012, and the new core rules were first published as a hardcover in April 2013.

Previous Fate of the Norns products until 2012 were sold only by the official website. Now, all current and future editions are distributed via online third-party vendors.

== Reception ==
The first edition 290-page book was well-received for its content and game mechanics, but presentation was rated as poor.

Valkauskas and his team of developers debuted the Anniversary Edition of Fate of the Norns: Ragnarok at Gen Con in August 2012, with the beginner-level campaign titled "Fafnir's Treasure." The campaign was designed to introduce RPG players to the mechanics of Fate of the Norns.

This edition has received positive reviews from a number of publications, including the Rockin' Comics podcast and CarnageCon.com

Most notably, Sophie Prell of Penny Arcade reviewed "Fafnir's Treasure" writing "In the third edition, Ragnarok ups the stakes by making the game high fantasy during an apocalyptic time period, and everything fits together in a wonderfully cohesive package. The art, text, even the rules feel like something mystical and ancient."
