= Eternal Soldier =

1986 combat role-playing game

Eternal Soldier is a set of rules for role-playing game combat that was published by Tai-Gear Simulations in 1986.

== Description ==
Eternal Soldier is a universal system, focusing mainly on providing combat rules usable in any genre or time period. The rules system is skill-based, covering character attributes, over 100 skills, combat, weapons, and many standard professions. The game includes appendices for science-fiction, fantasy, superheroes, magic, and psionics rules.

== Publication history ==
Eternal Soldier was designed by Chris Arnold, Rob Arnold, and Joe Mays, and published by Tai-Gear Simulations in 1986 as a 164-page book with two cardstock sheets.

== Reception ==
Stewart Wieck reviewed Eternal Soldier in White Wolf #9 (1988), rating it a 7 out of 10 and stated that "In general, I have to say 'thumbs up' to Eternal Soldier despite my prejudice against generic games. Tai-Gear has shown that a workable comprehensive system is possible."

Rick Swan wrote two reviews of Eternal Soldier.

- In the January-February 1989 issue of Space Gamer/Fantasy Gamer, Swan commented that "I guess you know when you've got something good when the clones start crawling out of the woodwork. The latest serving of sincere flattery for Steve Jackson's GURPS is Eternal Soldier, a role-playing system for 'Adventures in Any Age' that is, sad to report, not even a nice try."
- In his 1990 book The Complete Guide to Role-Playing Games, Swan called it "ambitious but disappointing", finding the rules derivative of Dungeons & Dragons, with underdeveloped ideas. Swan concluded by giving the game a poor rating of 1.5 out of 4, saying, "There may be a good idea or two buried somewhere in Eternal Soldier, but it'll take a determined referee to dig them out."
