= List of Villains and Vigilantes books =

Villains and Vigilantes is a Role-playing game in the superhero genre. It was an early RPG, originally published in 1979 and has currently been through two editions. A revision to the second edition, known as version 2.1, has been published by Monkey House Games, though some controversy surrounds this edition.

== First Edition ==
Title	Author	Date	Pages	Ref.	ISBN
Villains & Vigilantes (1st Edition)	Jeff Dee, Jack Herman	1979 (softcover)	40		
Break In At Three Kilometer Island	Rudy Kraft	1981 (softcover)	16		
Death Duel with the Destroyers	Bill Willingham	1982 (softcover), 2010 (pdf)	21		
The Island of Doctor Apocalypse	Bill Willingham	1982 (softcover), 2008 (pdf)	22		

== Second Edition ==
Title	Author	Date	Pages	Ref.	ISBN
Villains & Vigilantes 2nd Edition	Jeff Dee & Jack Herman	1982 (softcover), 2004 (pdf)	48		
Villains & Vigilantes 2nd Edition Box Set	Jeff Dee & Jack Herman	1982	48		
F.O.R.C.E.	Tom Dowd	1982	24		
Crisis at Crusader Citadel	Jeff Dee & Jack Herman	1982 (softcover), 2010 (pdf)	20		
Opponents Unlimited	Stefan Jones	1982 (softcover), 2011 (pdf)	24		
Most Wanted, Volume 1	Jack Herman	1983 (softcover), 2010 (pdf)	25		
From the Deeps of Space	Stefan Jones	1984 (softcover), 2011 (pdf)	25		
Devil's Domain	Troy Christensen	1984 (softcover), 2004 (pdf)	24		
Battle Above the Earth	Steve Crow	1984 (softcover), 2004 (pdf)	22		
The Dawn of DNA	Ken Campbell	1984 (softcover), 2011 (pdf)	20		
Villains & Vigilantes Counter Set No. 1	Jeff Dee	1984			
Organized Crimes	Ken Cliffe	1985 (softcover), 2004 (pdf)	25		
To Tackle the T.O.T.E.M.	Jeff O'Hare	1985 (softcover), 2011 (pdf)	24		
Alone Into the Night	Ken Cliffe & Kent Paling	1985 (softcover), 2004 (pdf)	28		
Honor: Enter the Dragon's Claw	Ken Cliffe	1985 (softcover), 2004 (pdf)	25		
Pre-Emptive Strike	Stephen Dedman	1985 (softcover), 2004 (pdf)	24		
Terror by Night	Steve Crow	1985 (softcover), 2004 (pdf)	20		
Assassin	Tom Dowd	1985 (softcover), 2004 (pdf)	33		
The Pentacle Plot	Stefan Jones	1985 (softcover), 2004 (pdf)	28		
Most Wanted Volume 3	Troy Christensen	1985 (softcover), 2004 (pdf)	32		
Search for the Sensei	Joseph W. Liotta	1986 (softcover), 2004 (pdf)	31		
Super-Crooks & Criminals	Ken Cliffe	1986 (softcover), 2004 (pdf)	24		
DNAgents Sourcebook	Jack Herman	1986	48		
Dawn of the Devil	Troy Christensen	1986 (softcover), 2004 (pdf)	24		
The Great Iridium Con	Stephen Dedman	1986 (softcover), 2004 (pdf)	27		
The Secret in the Swamp	Stewart Wieck	1986 (softcover), 2004 (pdf)	24		
For the Greater Good	Jeff O'Hare	1987 (softcover), 2004 (pdf)	28		
