= Battle Above the Earth =

Superhero role-playing game adventure

- Designers: Steve Crow
- Illustrators: Bill Cucinotta; Jeff Dee; Janet Jackson; Rich Rankin; Matt Wagner; Bill Willingham
- Publishers: Fantasy Games Unlimited
- Publication: 1984
- Genres: Superhero

Battle Above the Earth is an adventure published by Fantasy Games Unlimited in 1984 for the superhero role-playing game Villains and Vigilantes.

== Plot summary ==
The player characters must prevent a team of alien super-villains from taking over Space Station One orbiting Earth. The super-villains plan to hand the space station over to their fellow aliens to help them conquer Earth.

The game also includes conversion charts to allow players to use the adventure with the rival superhero game Superworld.

== Publication history ==
Villains & Vigilantes, released by FGU in 1979, was one of the first superhero RPGs. FGU published a second edition of V&V in 1982, and followed up with several adventures and supplements, one of those being 1984's Battle Above the Earth. It was written by Steve Crow as a 16-page book with removable cardstock counters featuring artwork by Bill Cucinotta, Jeff Dee, Janet Jackson, Rich Rankin, Matt Wagner, and Bill Willingham.

== Reception ==
In Issue 73 of Space Gamer, Craig Sheeley called this "an excellent scenario [...] designed to fit into any contemporary or futuristic Villains and Vigilantes campaign. With a little fudging, it could even be modified to use with other superhero systems..."

In Issue 32 of Comics Feature, Steve Perrin noted the similarity in plot with another recently published V&V adventure, From the Deeps of Space, and called Battle Above the Earth "[another adventure] dealing with yet another crew of desperate aliens who have taken over the space station."

== Other reviews and commentary ==
- Game News (Issue 1 - Mar 1985)
