= Organized Crimes =

1985 tabletop adventure game

Organized Crimes is a 1985 role-playing game adventure published by Fantasy Games Unlimited for Villains and Vigilantes.

== Plot summary ==
Organized Crimes is an adventure in which a two-part scenario begins with a car crash and a clue—a matchbook from Vanguard Shipping and Storage—leading the player characters into a case that appears to be simple jewel theft but hints at deeper criminal complexity. The police, sensing something beyond their reach, call in the characters to investigate. The scenario is structured in modular "capsules" that contain discrete encounters and plot segments. The antagonists include a recurring group called the Midnight Men.

== Publication history ==
Organized Crimes was written by Ken Cliffe and published by Fantasy Games Unlimited in 1985 as a 24-page book with removable cardstock counters.

== Reception ==
Ian Marsh reviewed Organised Crime for Adventurer magazine and stated that "I’ve seen Superhero adventures which are versatile and concentrate on plot, as well as providing the necessary combat encounters which are vital to the running of the scenario: compared to these, Organised Crime only runs as average for the genre."

== Reviews ==
- Adventurers Club (Issue 11 - Fall 1987)
- Comics Feature #42
