= DNAgents Sourcebook =

DNAgents Sourcebook is a 1986 role-playing game supplement published by Fantasy Games Unlimited for Villains and Vigilantes.

== Contents ==
DNAgents Sourcebook is a supplement in which the characters appearing in The DNAgents comic book series are described.

== Publication history ==
The DNAgents Sourcebook was written by Jack Herman with art by Will Meugniot, Willie Blyberg, Rick Hoberg, Richard Howell, and Jeff Dee and published by Fantasy Games Unlimited in 1986 as a 48-page book with removable cardstock counters.

Shannon Appelcline, in his book Designers & Dragons, noted that for V&V, "Bizar was working on creating comic field connections of his own. In the early 1980s he thought he was close to getting a licensing deal with Marvel but that ended up being offered to TSR instead. In the end, FGU produced only one licensed sourcebook, The DNAgents Sourcebook (1986), based on an Eclipse comic. It was clearly less notable than the Marvel license but it tied in nicely with the other work that FGU was doing with Eclipse at the time".

== Reviews ==
- Comics Feature #52
