= Devil's Domain =

Superhero role-playing game adventure

- Cover art by Dave Gifford
- Designers: Troy Christensen
- Illustrators: Jeff Dee; Dave Gifford
- Publishers: FGU
- Publication: 1984
- Genres: Superhero

Devil's Domain is an adventure published by Fantasy Games Unlimited (FGU) in 1984 for the superhero role-playing game Villains and Vigilantes.

== Plot summary ==
Devil's Domain is a high-level scenario where the player characters face zombies, mutants, spirits, ghouls, and demons. A power vortex that sucks people into it appears in the Bermuda Triangle, and then another at Stonehenge. These are apparently created by the devil himself, in order to drag more souls to Hell. The superheroes must travel to Easter Island to find the source of this madness.

== Publication history ==
Villains & Vigilantes, released by FGU in 1979, was one of the first superhero RPGs. FGU published a second edition in 1982, and followed up with several adventures and supplements, one of those being 1984's Devil's Domain, an adventure created by Troy Christensen, with cover art by Dave Gifford, and interior art by Jeff Dee.

Christensen designed a sequel, Dawn of the Devil, that was released by FGU in 1986.

== Reception ==
In Issue 76 of Space Gamer , William A. Barton called this adventure "simply a lot of fun ... a refreshing change from the normal V&V adventure (as good as those usually are) and a lot of nasty surprises for the player-characters." Barton liked the new demon monsters as well as their illustrations. However, Barton found "an appalling lack of proofreading — this book has more typos than I've noticed in an FGU product since the first edition of Space Opera." Despite this, Barton concluded, ""Devil's Domain is an excellent adventure for V&V superhero action. With the proper conversions, it'd serve admirably as a scenario for Champions, Superworld, or any other superhero RPG as well."

In Issue 37 of Comics Feature, Steve Perrin noted, "This scenario is difficult to translate into other game systems because of the multitude of demonic monsters. Still, this is a unique attempt to bring supernatural horror into superhero gaming, and it works pretty well." Perrin concluded, "It should be seriously considered, even if you play one of the other superhero games."

In Issue 9 of the Canadian games magazine Gateways, Serge Clermont was not impressed, writing, "Troy Christensen's Devil's Domain and Dawn of the Devil are both examples of how ridiculous superhero game themes can get. If one is expecting to battle demonic forces in these scenarios, one is going to be sadly disappointed when one learns that the author couldn't make up his mind whether he wanted this to be a science fiction adventure or a supernatural quest against evil. It takes a lot of skill to balance the two as to make it acceptable, much less believable, and unfortunately, Mr. Christiansen didn't have it." Clermont concluded, "It's a nice idea, but a stab at Lovecraft mixed with The Boogers from Outer Space leaves me cold."
