= Super-Crooks & Criminals =

Super-Crooks & Criminals is a 1986 role-playing game supplement published by Fantasy Games Unlimited for Villains and Vigilantes.

== Contents ==
Super-Crooks & Criminals is a supplement in which 18 supervillains and 3 supervillain groups are profiled, covering a total of 30 villains.

== Publication history ==
Super-Crooks & Criminals was written by Ken Cliffe and published by Fantasy Games Unlimited in 1986 as a 24-page book with removable cardstock counters.

== Reviews ==
- Comics Feature #47
- Adventurers Club (Issue 11 - Fall 1987)
- Iridia
