= To Tackle the T.O.T.E.M. =

Superhero role-playing game adventure

- Designers: Jeff O'Hare
- Illustrators: Don Heck; Jeff Dee
- Publishers: Fantasy Games Unlimited
- Publication: 1985
- Genres: Superhero

To Tackle the T.O.T.E.M. is an adventure published by Fantasy Games Unlimited in 1985 for the superhero role-playing game Villains and Vigilantes.

== Plot summary ==
To Tackle the T.O.T.E.M. is an adventure that pits the superhero player characters against genetically-altered supervillains working for the international conspiracy called TOTEM ("Total Order Through Elimination of the Masses") that is based in Tuscon, Arizona.

== Publication history ==
Villains & Vigilantes, released by FGU in 1979, was one of the first superhero RPGs. FGU published a second edition of V&V in 1982, and followed up with several adventures and supplements, one of those being 1985's To Tackle the T.O.T.E.M., written by Jeff O'Hare, with art by Don Heck and Jeff Dee and published as a 24-page book with removable cardstock counters.

== Reception ==
In Issue 76 of Space Gamer, William A. Barton commented, "While To Tackle the T.O.T.E.M. probably has enough good material in it to make it worthwhile to the dedicated V&V GM, as a whole it is lacking. I recommend it only to those who don't mind filling in the missing data or who collect all V&V scenarios released."

In Issue 39 of Comics Feature, Steve Perrin noted the Amerindian connotation of "TOTEM" and the setting of Tuscon, Arizona, and was disappointed to find that there was no apparent connection with an American Western theme. "Unfortunately, [designer Jeff O'Hare] didn't think of a way to actually bring them together. He just invented an acronym that sounded like it was involved with American Indians and hoped that it would provide the proper Wild Western flavor." Despite this, Perrin called this "a fun game. The villains are tough, the plot is unified and one event follows from another." Perrin concluded, "This adventure is far more tightly constructed [than previous V&V adventures], with one event flowing into another. Author Jeff O'Hare did his job well."

== Other reviews and commentary ==
- Game News #10 (Dec., 1985)
