= Honor: Enter the Dragon's Claw =

Honor: Enter the Dragon's Claw is a 1985 role-playing game adventure published by Fantasy Games Unlimited for Villains and Vigilantes.

== Contents ==
Honor: Enter the Dragon's Claw is an adventure in which the player characters go against ninja assassins.

== Publication history ==
Enter the Dragon's Claw: HONOR was written by Ken Cliffe with art by James Holloway and Jim Roslof, and published by Fantasy Games Unlimited in 1985 as a 20-page book with removable cardstock counters.

== Reviews ==
- Comics Feature #46
- Gateways
- Adventurers Club (Issue 11 - Fall 1987)
