= Most Wanted Volume 3 =

Most Wanted Volume 3 is a 1985 role-playing game supplement published by Fantasy Games Unlimited for Villains and Vigilantes.

== Contents ==
Most Wanted Volume 3 is a supplement in which 30 supervillains are described.

== Publication history ==
Most Wanted, Vol. 3 was written by Troy Christensen, with art by Patrick Zircher and published by Fantasy Games Unlimited in 1985 as a 32-page book with removable cardstock counters.

== Reviews ==
- Comics Feature #40
