= Dawn of the Devil =

1986 tabletop game adventure

Dawn of the Devil is a 1986 tabletop game adventure published by Fantasy Games Unlimited for Villains and Vigilantes.

== Plot summary ==
Dawn of the Devil is an adventure in which a high-level adventure has player characters of 10th level or higher explore an alien spaceship, which leads to a journey on another planet.

== Publication history ==
Dawn of the Devil was written by Troy Christensen, with art by Jill Thompson and Patrick Zircher and published by Fantasy Games Unlimited in 1986 as a 24-page book with removable cardstock counters.

== Reviews ==
- Gateways
