= Alone Into the Night =

1985 tabletop game adventure

Alone Into the Night is a 1985 tabletop game adventure published by Fantasy Games Unlimited for Villains and Vigilantes.

== Plot summary ==
Alone Into the Night is an adventure in which three short scenarios are designed for one gamemaster and a single player character.

== Publication history ==
Alone into the Night was written by Ken Cliffe and Kent Paling and published by Fantasy Games Unlimited in 1985 as a 24-page book with removable cardstock counters.

== Reviews ==
- Gateways
- Adventurers Club (Issue 11 - Fall 1987)
