= The Great Iridium Con =

Tabletop game adventure

The Great Iridium Con is a 1986 role-playing game adventure published by Fantasy Games Unlimited for Villains and Vigilantes.

== Plot summary ==
The Great Iridium Con is an adventure in which a science-fiction convention becomes the setting when the player characters encounter an alien starship.

== Publication history ==
The Great Iridium Con was written by Stephen Dedman and published by Fantasy Games Unlimited in 1986 as a 24-page book with removable cardstock counters.

== Reviews ==
- Comics Feature #56
- Adventurers Club (Issue 11 - Fall 1987)
