= Terror by Night (Villains and Vigilantes) =

Terror by Night is a 1985 role-playing game adventure published by Fantasy Games Unlimited for Villains and Vigilantes.

== Plot summary ==
Terror by Night is an adventure in which the player characters investigate a mysterious circus, featuring elephants, bats, and a fun house.

== Publication history ==
Terror by Night was written by Steve Crow, with art by Patrick Zircher and published by Fantasy Games Unlimited in 1985 as a 20-page book with removable cardstock counters.

== Reviews ==
- Comics Feature #38
- Game News (Issue 11 - Jan 1986)
- Gateways
