= Crisis at Crusader Citadel =

1982 Role-playing supplement

Crisis at Crusader Citadel was a 1982 introductory module written by Jeff Dee and Jack Herman for the Villains and Vigilantes role playing game released by Fantasy Games Unlimited.

== Plot summary ==
In it, the players controlled neophyte superheroes looking to apply for membership in the Crusaders, an esteemed team of superheroes. The Crusaders roster consisted of:

Manta Man, their leader, whose wife was killed by pirates and to exact revenge he built a costume that gave him the power to fly, breathe underwater and emit blasts of electricity.

Enforcer, a secret agent who betrayed his agency and saved a scientist who had developed a secret formula. Drinking the formula, he gained the ability to generate force fields. Enforcer also uses a specialized pistol.

Dreamweaver, a college student who gained the power to create illusions or become invisible from a dream research experiment.

Laserfire, a teenager who gained powers of heat and light when he was caught in the thrust of an alien spacecraft taking off nearby.

Evergreen, part woman, part plant, and able to mentally control vegetation. At the time of the module, she does not know her true origins.

Blizzard, a comic book fan who decided to follow the lead of his print heroes when he developed his power to create ice.

The players need to contend with the Crusaders' opposite numbers during the adventure, a villain group called the Crushers. A few of its members include Mocker, a robot able to fire sonic blasts, Mercury Mercenary, a soldier of fortune with superhuman speed and Enforcer's personal archenemy, Shocker, who has acidic blood and electric blasts and yearns to have Evergreen's love as well, and Marionette, a midget who can control minds.

== Publication history ==
Crisis at Crusader Citadel was written by Jack Herman and Jeff Dee, and published by Fantasy Games Unlimited in 1982 as a 16-page book.

== Legacy ==
Four years after the adventure booklet was published, Eclipse Comics published a four issue mini series based on the characters. The comic books included supplemental material to show the growth of the Crusaders and Crushers in the years between.

== Reception ==
William A. Barton reviewed Crisis at Crusader Citadel in The Space Gamer No. 63. Barton commented that "Crisis at Crusader Citadel is a fine introduction to V&V and could be mined for ideas for any of the other superhero systems on the market."

== Reviews ==
- Adventurers Club (Issue 11 - Fall 1987)
