= FORCE (Villains and Vigilantes) =

Cover art by Jeff Dee

FORCE is an adventure published by Fantasy Games Unlimited (FGU) in 1982 for the superhero role-playing game Villains and Vigilantes.

== Plot summary ==
FORCE is an adventure in which a group of supervillains called The Force have stolen both a deadly virus and a nuclear bomb, and are threatening to detonate the combination over most of the United States unless a large ransom of diamonds is paid. Several days before the ransom deadline, the superheroes (player characters) are approached on the street by a reporter who has information about Force, but before he can reveal anything, he dies of a brain hemorrhage. As the superheroes investigate, they uncover clues to a cult in Kansas and its mysterious leader.

== Publication history ==
Villains & Vigilantes, published by FGU in 1979, was the first superhero role-playing game. FGU published a revised second edition in 1982, and the adventure F.O.R.C.E. was released shortly afterwards.

F.O.R.C.E. was written by Thomas Dowd with artwork by Jeff Dee, and was published by Fantasy Games Unlimited in 1983 as a 24-page book.

== Reception ==
William A. Barton reviewed FORCE in Space Gamer No. 65. Barton commented that "FORCE can provide some exciting superhero play if handled correctly, either for V&V or as a source of ideas for other superhero systems available."

== Reviews ==
- Comics Feature #43
