= Assassin (Villains and Vigilantes) =

Assassin is a 1985 role-playing game adventure published by Fantasy Games Unlimited for Villains and Vigilantes.

== Plot summary ==
Assassin is an adventure in which the Justice Defenders must prevent the Raiders from assassinating a United States Senator.

== Publication history ==
Assassin was written by Thomas Dowd and published by Fantasy Games Unlimited in 1985 as a 32-page book with removable cardstock counters.

== Reviews ==
- Comics Feature #43
- Adventurers Club (Issue 11 - Fall 1987)
