= The Pentacle Plot =

The Pentacle Plot is a 1985 role-playing game adventure published by Fantasy Games Unlimited for Villains and Vigilantes.

== Plot summary ==
The Pentacle Plot is an adventure in which the player characters must travel to the alternate medieval world of Vine to stop Mr. Noman's Tarot‑Masters, the Pentacle Army, and the sinister Grell Empire from carrying out their plot.

== Publication history ==
The Pentacle Plot was written by Stefan Jones, with art by Jill Thompson, Mark Nelson, and Patrick Zircher and published by Fantasy Games Unlimited in 1985 as a 24-page book with removable cardstock counters.

== Reviews ==
- Comics Feature #41
- Papyrus (Issue 5 - 1991)
