= For the Greater Good (Villains and Vigilantes) =

1987 tabletop game adventure

For the Greater Good is a 1987 tabletop game adventure published by Fantasy Games Unlimited for Villains and Vigilantes.

== Plot summary ==
For the Greater Good is an adventure in which a scenario centered on a televangelist-style crusade against superheroes features Brother Angel and his ultraconservative supervillain allies White Guardian, Pro-Life, Auntie Porn, and Corporal Punishment.

== Publication history ==
For the Greater Good was written by Jeff O'Hare with art by Patrick Zircher and published by Fantasy Games Unlimited in 1987 as a 24-page book with removable cardstock counters.

== Reviews ==
- Gateways
