= Shawn Knight (disambiguation) =

Sean, Shaun or Shawn Knight may refer to:

- Sean Knight (born 1969), Barbadian boxer
- Sean Knight (artist), artist of Pre-Emptive Strike (Villains and Vigilantes)
- Sean Knight (rugby), American rugby player at the 1995 National Rugby Championships
- Shaun Knight (born 1990), English rugby union player
- Shawn Knight (born 1964), American football player
- Shawn Knight (quarterback) (born 1972), American football player
