= Elementals (Comico Comics) =

Comic book superhero team

Publication information
- Publisher: Texas Comics, Comico
- First appearance: Justice Machine Annual #1 (1983)
- Created by: Bill Willingham

In-story information
- Member(s): Morningstar; Vortex; Fathom; Monolith

Elementals is an American superhero comic book first published in 1984 and created by Bill Willingham, for which he was both writer and artist.

== Publication history ==
The Elementals first appeared in the Justice Machine Annual, published by Texas Comics in 1983. (Note: Texas Comics, based in Houston, was the creation of a few comic book fans who had previously worked together on a fanzine called Comics Informer. The company operated out of the offices of the retailer Camelot Comics.) (Note: Justice Machine Annual also featured a crossover between the Justice Machine and the T.H.U.N.D.E.R. Agents, a famous 1960s superhero team originally published by Tower Comics.) The Elementals were supposed to become a bimonthly series, alternating with the Justice Machine, but Texas Comics folded after publishing the one comic. After Texas Comics folded, The Elementals were taken over by Comico Comics.

In a variety of specials and limited series, Comico published Elementals until 1996. Comico's publisher, Andrew Rev, purchased the Elementals property from Willingham in the 1990s.

== Fictional setting and characters ==
When a centuries-old sorcerer named Lord Saker built a machine called the Shadowspear to harness the supernatural powers of the world, he upset the natural order of the universe. In response, the four elements, unimaginably powerful spirits who together formed the foundation of existence, each chose an ordinary human who had been killed by their element, and resurrected him or her. They granted each member control of that particular element, eternal youth, and the ability to heal from any wound (given sufficient time). The team consisted of:

- Morningstar, aka Jeanette Crane, a Los Angeles homicide detective who had burned to death while confronting a serial arsonist; she received various fire-related abilities, including pyrokinesis and an immunity to fire.
- Vortex, aka Jeff Murphy, a Coast Guard pilot and Vietnam veteran who was asphyxiated in a helicopter crash; he received various air-related abilities, including flight and wind-blasts.
- Fathom, aka Becky Golden, a flighty debutante who fell off a boat and drowned; she received various water-related abilities, as well as bright green skin and webbed fingers. She was also able to convert her body entirely into sentient water and shoot high-pressure streams.
- Monolith, aka Tommy Czuchra, a brilliant if introverted teenaged boy who was crushed to death by a landslide; he received the ability to become an enormous super-strong stone/earth golem. Later, Tommy came to follow Saker's view that the supernatural beings were entitled to be in charge across earth, and he quit the Elementals and absorbed some of Saker's 'black' magic, to become one of his generals. Monolith was then re-embodied in a deceased insurance salesman (Donald Ridgeway), who neither wanted the power, nor ever understood fully how to use it or how to integrate with the other three Elementals.

The four eventually defeated Saker and his minions, the Destroyers, a team of six: Shapeshifter, Annihilator, Chrysalis, Behemoth, Ratman (who later changed sides), and Electrocutioner. (Note: The Destroyers and an early version of Saker known as Doctor Apocalypse originally appeared in 1982 in Death Duel with the Destroyers and The Island of Doctor Apocalypse, two Willingham-written supplements for the superhero role-playing game Villains and Vigilantes.)

Shadowspear, once released from Saker's control, formed a giant malevolent thunderstorm that circled the globe, occasionally transforming animals and corpses into monsters, thus keeping the Elementals busy for many years.

== Reception ==
Martin A. Stever reviewed Elementals in Space Gamer/Fantasy Gamer No. 83. Stever commented that "Willingham's imagination must be on overdrive to come up with some of the far out ideas in Elementals".

== Bibliography ==
- Justice Machine Annual, Texas Comics, 1983 (first appearance)
- Elementals #1–29, 1984–88
- Elementals vol. 2, #1–26, 1989–93
- Elementals vol. 3, #1–3, 1995–96

=== One-shots and mini-series ===
- Elementals Special - 2 issues, 1986, 1989 (lead into v2)
- Elementals: Sex Special - 4 issues, 1991–93
- Elementals: Sex Special vol. 2, 2 issues, 1997
- Elementals: Sexy Lingerie Special one-shot, 1993
- Elementals: Ghost of a Chance one-shot, 1995
- Elementals Swimsuit Spectacular 1996 one-shot
- Elementals: How the War was won - 2 issues, 1996
- Elementals: The Vampire's Revenge - 2 issues, 1996

=== Spin-offs ===
- Justice Machine Featuring the Elementals - 4 issues, 1986
- Fathom - 3 issues, 1987
- Morningstar Special, 1990
- Monolith - 4 issues, 1991
- Vortex - 2 issues, 1991
- Strikeforce America - 1 issue, 1992
- Fathom vol. 2, 3 issues, 1992
- Oblivion - 3 issues, 1995–96
- Strikeforce America vol. 2, 1 issue, 1996

=== Trade paperback collection ===
- Elementals: The Natural Order (160 pages, softcover, Comico Comics, November 1988, ISBN 0-938965-08-5) - reprints Justice Machine Annual and Elementals vol. 1, #1–5
