= Counter Set no. 1 =

1984 tabletop game supplement

Counter Set no. 1 is a 1984 tabletop game supplement published by Fantasy Games Unlimited for Villains and Vigilantes.

== Contents ==
Counter Set no. 1 is a supplement in which a set of full-color cardstock counters are used for tracking character positions during combat.

== Publication history ==
V&V Counter Set No. 1 was written by Jeff Dee and published by Fantasy Games Unlimited in 1984 as eight cardstock sheets.
