= Search for the Sensei =

1986 tabletop game adventure

Search for the Sensei is a 1986 tabletop game adventure published by Fantasy Games Unlimited for Villains and Vigilantes.

== Plot summary ==
Search for the Sensei is an adventure in which a scenario features Japanese yakuza, ninja, and Chinese Tongs, and is compatible with both Champions and Superworld.

== Publication history ==
Search for the Sensei was written by Joseph W. Liotta and published by Fantasy Games Unlimited in 1986 as a 32-page book with removable cardstock counters.

== Reviews ==
- Adventurers Club (Issue 11 - Fall 1987)
