= TWERPS =

Role playing game

- TWERPS Basic Rules, second edition, first print
- Designers: "Jeff & 'Manda Dee"
- Publishers: Gamescience
- Genres: Universal
- Systems: TWERPS

TWERPS (The World's Easiest Role-Playing System) is a minimalist role-playing game (RPG) originally created by Reindeer Games in 1987 (whose sole product was the TWERPS line) and distributed by Gamescience. Presented as a parody of the complicated RPG systems which were prevalent at the time while still being a playable game in its own right, its simple structure and humorous nature gave it unexpected popularity.

== Description ==
TWERPS, (The World's Easiest Role-Playing System), is a humorous universal system of minimalist rules. Characters have only one ability, Strength. Rules sections cover Strength, Combat, and "How to Do Everything." The game includes a sample character sheet, a combat hex sheet, cardstock miniatures, and an introductory micro-mini-scenario.

The actual rules of the game are indeed extremely simple. Characters are defined by a single attribute, "Strength", which is used for determining all traditional role-playing elements, such as whether or not the character successfully hits in combat, how fast they can move and how much damage they can take before dying. A de facto skill system exists in the form of "character classes" which give numerical bonuses to certain activities if their role called for it (for instance, a pilot having a +1 modifier on their roll to fly an aircraft).

== Publication history ==
TWERPS was originally created, written and illustrated (in a distinctive cartoony style) by "Jeff & 'Manda Dee", Jeff Dee being a noted game illustrator and co-writer of Villains and Vigilantes. It was published by Reindeer Games in 1987 as a digest-sized 8-page pamphlet, with four cardstock sheets.

=== First Edition titles ===
Originally each installment of the TWERPS system was sold in a small plastic bag containing an 8-page leaflet, a sheet of cardstock counters to be cut apart, little cardstock hex-maps and a tiny twenty-sided die (but with 1-10 on it twice to make it function as a ten-sided die), each being a downsized imitation of elements often found in larger, more elaborate games. The initial run of titles was printed at low cost with black ink on various colored papers to distinguish the various titles (the main rules were on pink paper, the kung-fu rules were on yellow, and so on).

- TWERPS Basic Rules: the core system, including the sample adventure "Watery Depths".
- Fly-By Knights: a fantasy setting, describing very succinctly the world of Arkosa where characters ride various breeds of aerial mounts, stalk the fearsome Meganocerous and vie for knighthood.
- Magic: a rules expansion outlining a surprisingly detailed (for TWERPS anyway) magic system and spell-list.
- Space Cadets: guidelines for a space opera setting, in the form of various types of character classes, SF weaponry and psychic powers. Basic rules for vehicles were included.
- Kung Fu Dragons!: a list of various martial arts which characters could train in and a system of colored belts to reward them. One of the cardstock extras was a tiny Game-master's screen.

=== Second Edition titles ===
As the game grew in popularity, the supplements were re-printed in expanded form with more pages and multi-color printing. New supplements covering new genres and specific objects of parody were also added. These expansions and later supplements were mainly written by Norman F. Morin Jr., Brian Rayburn, Jon Hancock and Niels Erickson rather than Jeff & 'Manda Dee. The tone of these second edition titles was noticeably one of more overt humor and silliness, peppering the text with puns (and even calling on fans to mail in suggested puns of their own for future supplements).

- All of the First Edition titles described above were reprinted in expanded full-color form.
- Rocket Rangers: the companion to Space Cadets, this volume offered systems for spaceship design and combat and several sample ships. Unlike other 2nd edition titles, Rocket Rangers was mainly written by Jeff & 'Manda Dee.
- Twerps Twek: a direct parody of Star Trek, requiring Space Cadets and Rocket Rangers to use.
- Robo-Punks: rules for running Cyberpunk adventures, including brief systems for cybernetic implants and net-running.
- Superdudes: a list of super-powers for running superhero adventures.
- Metaphysical Ninja Maniac Chainsaw Vitamin Junkies: guidelines for running post-apocalyptic scenarios in the spirit of films like The Road Warrior (with a heavy addition of gonzo wackiness), including rules for vehicle damage and mutations.
- Twisted Tales of Terror: the horror supplement, with guidelines for creating monsters or playing monsters as player-characters.
- M.E.C.H.I.-Tech: a system for the design and battles between giant robots, with many direct riffs on the popular Battletech games.
- The T.W.E.R.P.S. Files: a direct parody of The X Files.
- How to Do Everything Better: a general rules expansion, offering more character classes, more superpowers and more equipment. Also included were rules for allowing TWERPS characters to gain dimension-travelling powers.

== Reception ==
Stewart Wieck reviewed the product in the December 1986 to January 1987 issue of White Wolf. He downplayed generic role-playing games in general but noted this product was inexpensive, which was part of the appeal of these systems.

Game critic Rick Swan reviewed the game twice:

- In his 1990 book The Complete Guide to Role-Playing Games, Swan noted "Obviously Twerps isn't going to hold anyone's attention for more than a few minutes, but those few minutes are actually kind of fun." Swan gave the game a rating of 2.5 out of 4.
- In the September 1993 issue of Dragon, Swan commented "So maybe it’s a joke. Billed as 'The Worlds Easiest Role-Playing System,' the TWERPS game gets remarkable mileage out of a single statistic (Strength, determined by the roll of a 10-sided die) ... Considering its limits, TWERPS works surprisingly well."

Eric Jacobson reviewed TWERPS Basic Rules in White Wolf #47 (Sept., 1994), rating it a 4 out of 5 and stated that "For [the price] you can't lose. Releasing a horde of additional, inexpensive support books, Gamescience offers access to almost every gaming genre. For such a simple little game, it's amazing what you can do."

== See also ==
- Hunter Planet
