= The Dawn of DNA =

Tabletop role-playing game supplement

The Dawn of DNA is a 1984 role-playing game adventure for Villains and Vigilantes published by Fantasy Games Unlimited.

== Plot summary ==
The Dawn of DNA is an adventure scenario in which the superhero player characters must stop the other-dimensional conqueror Doctor DNA and his European supervillain minions, the Errants.

== Reception ==
William A. Barton reviewed The Dawn of DNA in Space Gamer No. 71. Barton commented that "The Dawn of DNA is a solid, if not overly spectacular or innovative, adventure that could easily occupy an afternoon or evening of play for characters of any of the current superhero RPGs available."

== Reviews ==
- Comics Feature #33
