= The Secret in the Swamp =

1986 tabletop game adventure

The Secret in the Swamp is a 1986 tabletop game adventure published by Fantasy Games Unlimited for Villains and Vigilantes.

== Plot summary ==
The Secret in the Swamp is an adventure in which the player characters investigate a break-in at a secret chemical warfare facility in the Everglades, with local Native Americans potentially holding the key to the mystery.

== Publication history ==
The Secret in the Swamp was written by Stewart Wieck, with art by Patrick Zircher and published by Fantasy Games Unlimited in 1987 as a 24-page book with removable cardstock counters.

Shannon Appelcline, in his book Designers & Dragons, said that though the growth of the industry "was slowing in the mid-1980s, it was still a very early time in the industry's history. There were not a lot of long-time [...] designers and thus it was possible for fresh new faces with innate talent to break in. Such was the case when two Alabama brothers - Stewart and Steve Wieck - sent a Villains & Vigilantes adventure to FGU. Much to their surprise, The Secret of the Swamp (1986) was accepted and published."
