= Campaign Book 1: Rhodesia =

Campaign Book 1: Rhodesia is a 1984 role-playing game supplement published by Fantasy Games Unlimited for Merc.

== Contents ==
Campaign Book 1: Rhodesia is a supplement in which a campaign setting is presented which is focused on mercenary operations that were part of the Rhodesian (Zimbabwe) civil war. It contains an adventure scenario for gameplay.

== Publication history ==
Campaign 1: Rhodesia was written by Paul D. Baader with art by Dennis B. Meehan, and was published by Fantasy Games Unlimited in 1984 as a 24-page book.

== Reviews ==
- Game News #6 (Aug., 1985)
