= Kung Fu Dragons! =

1987 role-playing game supplement

Kung Fu Dragons! is a 1987 role-playing game supplement published by Reindeer Games for TWERPS.

== Contents ==
Kung Fu Dragons! is a supplement in which a set of martial arts rules is provided featuring styles such as Kung Fu, Lung Fu, Sna Fu, and Toe Fu. It also comes with cardstock miniatures and a gamemaster's screen.

== Publication history ==
Kung Fu Dragons! was written by Jeff Dee and 'Manda Dee and published by Reindeer Games in 1987 as an 8-page pamphlet, a cardstock miniatures sheet, and a cardstock screen.

== Reviews ==
- The Last Province (Issue 2 - Dec 1992)
