= Fly-By Knights =

Fly-By Knights is a 1987 role-playing game supplement published by Reindeer Games for TWERPS.

== Contents ==
Fly-By Knights is a supplement in which a set of campaign rules is presented, centered on knights who soar through the skies of Demuria on aerial mounts. It introduces specialized character classes, details the use of mounts and the mechanics of flying, and expands the arsenal with new weapons and armor. It also provides a map of Demuria.

== Publication history ==
Fly by Knights was written by Amanda Dee and Jeff Dee and published by Reindeer Games in 1987 as an 8-page pamphlet, cardstock miniatures sheets, a cardstock map, and a cardstock character sheet.

== Reviews ==
- The Last Province (Issue 2 - Dec 1992)
