= An Ambassador's Tales =

An Ambassador's Tales is a 1985 role-playing game supplement published by Fantasy Games Unlimited for Flashing Blades.

== Contents ==
An Ambassador's Tales is a supplement in which five interconnected adventure scenarios have the player characters accompany a French ambassador to other lands.

== Publication history ==
An Ambassador's Tales was written by Mark Pettigrew and published by Fantasy Games Unlimited in 1985 as a 32-page book.
