= TWERPS Magic =

1987 role-playing game supplement

TWERPS Magic is a 1987 role-playing game supplement published by Reindeer Games for TWERPS.

== Contents ==
TWERPS Magic is a supplement in which a set of magic rules is introduced featuring eleven distinct spells, accompanied by cardstock miniatures and a record sheet for tracking magic use.

== Publication history ==
TWERPS Magic was written by Jeff Dee and 'Manda Dee and published by Reindeer Games in 1987 as an 8-page pamphlet, a 4-page spell book, and two cardstock sheets.

== Reviews ==
- The Complete Guide to Role-Playing Games
