= Pieces of Eight (disambiguation) =

Pieces of eight were Spanish coins.

Pieces of Eight may refer to

- Pieces of Eight, an album by Styx 1978
- Pieces of Eight (Don Ellis Octet album), live album recorded 1967, released 2006
- Pieces of Eight (1959 revue), London, with sketches by Peter Cook
- Pieces of Eight (1985 musical), Edmonton, music by Jule Styne
- Pieces of Eight (Skull & Crossbones), a 1980 supplement for the role-playing game Skull & Crossbones
- Pieces of Eight (plays), 8 one-act plays presented in 1982-1983, by Tom Stoppard and 7 other dramatists
- Pieces of Eight, shop on New Orleans Square Disneyland

== Film and TV ==
- Pieces of Eight, 1956 BBC TV children's movie with Michael Caridia and other child actors
- Pieces of Eight, 1957 Season 1 Episode 2 of The Adventures of Long John Silver
- Pieces of Eight, Season 5 Episode 8 of Davey and Goliath (1960)
- Pieces of Eight, 1977 Season 1 Episode 3 of Eight Is Enough
- Pieces of Eight, 2003 Season 4 Episode 2 of Andromeda (TV series)
- Pieces of Eight, 2013 Season 1 Episode 15 of Swashbuckle (TV series)
- Pieces of Eight, 2016 Season 2 Episode 9 of The Coroner (TV series)
