= The Cardinal's Peril =

The Cardinal's Peril is a 1985 role-playing game supplement published by Fantasy Games Unlimited for Flashing Blades.

== Contents ==
The Cardinal's Peril is a supplement in which four short adventure scenarios are intended for musketeer player characters: "The Haunted Villa", "The Cardinal's Peril", "The Lady of La Rochelle", and "The Royal Hunt". It also provides a short history overview of the King's Musketeers.

== Publication history ==
The Cardinal's Peril was written by Mark Pettigrew and J. Andrew Keith, and was published by Fantasy Games Unlimited in 1985 as a 32-page book.
