= Wild West (role-playing game) =

Tabletop western role-playing game

Cover art by Bob Charrette

Wild West is a role-playing game published by Fantasy Games Unlimited (FGU) in 1981 that is set in the Wild West frontier.

== Description ==
Wild West is a system of skill-based character rules that is set in the American western frontier of the mid-19th century.

To create a character, the player chooses an occupation such as cattle baron, gambler, dentist, shepherd or lawman, and then adds applicable skills from a list of forty-five that includes Marksmanship, Locksmithing, Weather Forecasting and Mule Skinning.

Skill resolution is achieved by cross-referencing the relevant skill with the difficulty of the task. Other rules cover employment, gambling, dynamite, horses, cattle drives, mule trains, stage lines, railroads, the military, and the Indians. Dodge City is briefly described as a campaign setting, and the game also includes a map of the Old West.

== Publication history ==
Wild West was designed by Anthony P. LeBoutillier and Gerald D. Seypura, and was published in 1981 by FGU as a boxed set with cover art by Bob Charrette, and included a 40-page rulebook, a large map, and four reference sheets.

The only supplement for Wild West was the adventure Trouble on Widow's Peak published by FGU in 1984.

== Reception ==
Steve Peterson reviewed Wild West for Different Worlds magazine and stated that "Overall, Wild West lags behind the field in terms of playability and presentation. The combat system is usable, but it is definitely not an advance of the art of game design. The lack of background material really prevents Wild West from being a playable game. If you are willing to spend a fair amount of time, pick up Wild West. The map of Dodge City circa 1880 is quite useful, and so is the map of the Old West. If you want to run some western role-playing, here is my advice: buy Wild West."

In Issue 52 of The Space Gamer, W.G. Armintrout commented "Wild West is OK in my book - the good basic system makes up for the lack of polish. It is worth looking into."

In his 1990 book The Complete Guide to Role-Playing Games, game critic Rick Swan liked the "clever" character-creation system, and the "nice" task resolution system. But Swan found the rest of the game "a hodge-podge of underdeveloped ideas. The combat system is pointlessly complicated, the equipment lists are colorless and inadequately detailed." Swan's biggest issue was the lack of background material about the Old West although he also pointed out that "The awkward organization ... and hand-drawn maps don't do much to enhance the game's appeal." Swan concluded by giving this game a poor rating of 2 out of 4, saying, "Western aficionados might be able to dig out a few interesting character generation ideas, but casual players will find Wild Wrest to be more frustrating than fun."

== Reviews ==
- Adventure Gaming #10

== See also ==
- The Knuckleduster Firearms Shop
