= Parisian Adventure =

Parisian Adventure is a 1985 role-playing game adventure published by Fantasy Games Unlimited for Flashing Blades.

== Plot summary ==
Parisian Adventure is an adventure in which four swashbuckling adventures are featured, along with a guide to 17th-century Paris, a Rumormill for plot hooks, and a list of exotic items.

- The Fencing Master: Players must rescue a kidnapped master swordsman, head of the Fraternity Sainte-Didier, from his arch-rival.
- The Grand Theatre: A high-energy espionage mission where King's Musketeers and Cardinal's Guard battle backstage to recover stolen documents — all while a play is in progress.
- The Great Marksmanship Tourney: Players can compete in a shooting tournament, and engage in subplots of intrigue.
- Scavenger Hunt: A humorous quest to collect three birthday presents for a mistress, with dangers to dignity rather than life.

== Publication history ==
Parisian Adventure was written by Mark Pettigrew and published by Fantasy Games Unlimited in 1984 as a 32-page book.

Parisian Adventure was the first adventure pack published for Flashing Blades.

== Reception ==
Sean Holland reviewed Parisian Adventure for Different Worlds magazine and stated that "All in all, if you play Flashing Blades, Parisian Adventure is a good buy, and an exciting addition to the world of Flashing Blades."
