= Merc Supplement 1: In Country =

Role-playing game supplement

Merc Supplement 1: In Country is a supplement published by Fantasy Games Unlimited (FGU) in 1983 for the modern combat role-playing game Merc.

== Publication history ==
FGU published the modern-day mercenary combat role-playing game Merc in 1981. Two years later, FGU published Merc Supplement 1: In Country, a 28-page softcover supplement written by Paul D. Baader, Lawrence Sangee, and Walter Mark.

Despite the title "Supplement 1", no further supplements were ever published.

== Contents ==
Merc Supplement 1: In Country adds more detail to the original Merc rules, both to add more options to the game — poison, airborne operations, rappelling, vehicle malfunctions — and to add more realism, such as placing some restrictions on small arms fire, medkits and walkie-talkies.

== Reception ==
In Imagine, Paul Cockburn thought the audience for Merc and Supplement 1 was limited, saying, "Merc is clearly designed for the gun nut, the sort of role-player who likes to know just how much of a mess his assault rifle will make of a 'soft' target [...] The book is dedicated to 'Mad' Mike Hoare, (Mercenary Extraordinaire) - and I'm sure he'll be delighted."

In the January–February 1984 edition of Different Worlds (Issue 32), William A. Barton reviewed both the original game of Merc and Supplement 1, and thought the price was "just a bit steep for those not thoroughly committed to modern merc role-playing." But he concluded, "If you do decide on Merc, go the extra five buckls for Supplement 1, too."
