= Alderson Yards Shipbook =

Alderson Yards Shipbook is a 1986 role-playing game supplement published by Fantasy Games Unlimited for Other Suns.

== Contents ==
Alderson Yards Shipbook is a supplement in which descriptions are provided for various spacecraft, including both personal and merchant ship types.

== Publication history ==
Alderson Yards Shipbook was written by Niall C. Shapero and Steven S. Crompton and published by Fantasy Games Unlimited in 1986 as a 48-page book.

== Reviews ==
- Papyrus (Issue 9 - 1993)
