= Other Suns =

Tabletop science fiction role-playing game

Role Playing Game of Science Fiction Adventure
- Designers: Niall C. Shapero
- Publishers: Fantasy Games Unlimited
- Publication: 1983; 43 years ago
- Genres: Science fiction
- Systems: Basic Role-Playing

Other Suns is a science-fiction role-playing game published by Fantasy Games Unlimited (FGU), and designed by Niall C. Shapero in 1983.

== Description ==
Other Suns is a science-fiction space-adventure system of medium complexity. The game includes a dozen alien races that resemble humanoid Earth animals such as cats, foxes, and bears.

Character creation requires the calculation of two dozen attributes and abilities. Combat covers many options for offense and defense, but is complex. Other rules cover skills, psionics, careers, experience, and other technology. Game critic Rick Swan found the section of spaceship design "difficult to use". The section on world-building goes into great detail on some physical aspects of planets.

== Publication history ==
Other Suns was designed by Niall C. Shapero, and was published in 1983 by FGU as a boxed set with a 72-page book, a 64-page book, a cardstock gamemaster's screen, and a sample character sheet.

An additional article entitled "Luna, The Empire and the Stars" by Shapero that expanded upon the background contained in the boxed set appeared in the Ares section of Dragon #89.

A single supplement, Alderson Yards Shipbook, was published in 1986.

== Reception ==
In Issue 39 of Different Worlds, Troy Christensen commented, "Overall I found Other Suns to be just too complicated for the rewards that it gave. It does have some interesting rules but they are shadowed by the immense complexity which Other Suns is built around. I would strongly suggest new science-fantasy role-players to look elsewhere for excitement. For those who have been playing for many years I would give my recommendations only if the players deeply enjoyed playing with realistic solar systems and complicated rules."

Dave Nalle, writing for Abyss, found a lot of issues with the ability stats, pointing out there were "three stats all of which describe physical size in one way or another, two stats covering telepathy, and no stats for speed, reaction, education or social status. The stats don't really seem to have been thought out." He also found issues with the combat system, noting, "How this works is somewhat unclear and a bit cluttered." Nalle also found the organization of the rules was "very strange, with elements sort of thrown in randomly." Nalle concluded, "I have to give Other Suns a very provisional recommendation ... it is a raw and unrefined game which you will have to work with and adapt to fit your needs. It is not daring and it is not exciting, but it is fairly simple and playable."

In his 1990 book The Complete Guide to Role-Playing Games, game critic Rick Swan noted that this game was "rendered in excruciating detail." He found the character generation system too complicated, as it "involves the calculation of about two dozen characteristics, many requiring lengthy formulas and a lot of math". Swan had the same concerns about combat, noting that "keeping track of special hits, fumbles, endurance, accumulated damage, and other factors gets tedious mighty fast". Swan concluded by giving this game a poor rating of only 2 out of 4, but suggested that "[the] variety of alien races, detailing their appearance, weaponry, and attitudes ... could make a good source of ideas for other science-fiction games".

In his 1991 book Heroic Worlds, Lawrence Schick found the rules were very similar to RuneQuest. He also noted the many alien races that resembled Earth-based animals, and as a result called Other Suns "the original 'Pets in Space' game".

James Davis Nicoll in 2020 for Black Gate said "aliens for the most part are curiously similar to humanoid animals for the most part, which makes this one of the earlier furry RPGs. The aliens were also available as PCs, so anyone not wanting to play a member of a second tier group notable mainly for being homicidal bastards who almost crashed civilization could select something more palatable. Seriously, why play a naked ape when you could be a telepathic fox person?"
