= High Seas =

High Seas may refer to:

- International waters
- High Seas (TV series), 2019 Spanish Netflix original
- High Seas (film), 1929 British film
- High Seas (album), 2001 album by Trailer Bride
- "High Seas" (NCIS), episode of American television series NCIS season 1
- High Seas (Flashing Blades), a 1985 role-playing game supplement

== See also ==
- HI-SEAS, the Hawaii Space Exploration Analog and Simulation habitat
