= Pre-Emptive Strike (Villains and Vigilantes) =

Pre-Emptive Strike is a 1985 role-playing game adventure published by Fantasy Games Unlimited for Villains and Vigilantes.

== Plot summary ==
Pre-Emptive Strike is an adventure in which the player characters race to recover a stolen nuclear weapon, while navigating underwater movement and combat challenges.

== Publication history ==
Pre-Emptive Strike was written by Stephan Dedman, with art by Sean Knight and published by Fantasy Games Unlimited in 1985 as a 20-page book with removable cardstock counters.

== Reviews ==
- Comics Feature #43
