= From the Deeps of Space =

From the Deeps of Space is a 1984 role-playing game adventure for Villains and Vigilantes published by Fantasy Games Unlimited.

== Plot summary ==
From the Deeps of Space is an adventure scenario in which the player characters must stop the aliens of Capella who have taken over the village called Midville.

== Reception ==
Craig Sheeley reviewed From the Deeps of Space in Space Gamer No. 72. Sheeley commented that "a beautiful adventure. It can be translated to any other superhero roleplaying system, too; the plot is that great. With a name like From the Deeps of Space, how can you lose?"

William A. Barton reviewed From the Deeps of Space for Different Worlds magazine and stated that "Overall, From the Deeps of Space is a well-conceived idea for outer-space superhero action and, except for the minor flaws noted, is competently executed as well. The ideas here can be converted relatively painlessly to most other superhero role-playing games in addition to V&V. I can easily see a group of Heroes Unlimited, Superworld, or Champions characters taking on the Capellans - though aficionados of the Marvel Super Hero system might experience problems in converting Deeps to that game. Thus this scenario would be a good buy for almost anyone interested in superheroic role-playing with a more traditional science-fiction setting than is usually the case."

== Reviews ==
- Comics Feature #32
