= Opponents Unlimited =

Role-playing game supplement

Opponents Unlimited is a 1982 role-playing game supplement for Villains and Vigilantes published by Fantasy Games Unlimited.

== Contents ==
Opponents Unlimited is a supplement presenting Villains & Vigilantes game statistics for supervillains.

== Reception ==
William A. Barton reviewed Opponents Unlimited in The Space Gamer No. 63. Barton commented that "Though its usefulness is lessened by its excessive silliness, Opponents Unlimited could be of value to those V&V GMs who don't have time to create their own villains and don't mind tossing opponents named Cosmic Zoom, who wear deep-sea diver's gear, at their heroes. I guess it all depends on which comics you read."
