= TWERPS Space Cadets =

TWERPS Space Cadets is a 1989 role-playing supplement for TWERPS published by Gamescience.

== Contents ==
TWERPS Space Cadets is a supplement in which adventuring in space is detailed.

== Publication history ==
Space Cadets was written by Jeff Dee and 'Manda Dee, and was published by Reindeer Games in 1989 as a digest-sized book.

== Reception ==
Eric Jacobson reviewed TWERPS Space Cadets, 2nd Edition in White Wolf #48 (Oct., 1994), rating it a 4 out of 5 and stated that "Alone, or with whatever supplements you pick up, Space Cadets is worth the [price]. If you can't stand the puns, then sit down. Space Cadets makes for a bargain campaign."

== Reviews ==
- The Last Province (Issue 2 - Dec 1992)
