= Bloodbath (role-playing game) =

1988 fantasy role-playing game

Bloodbath is a fantasy role-playing game published by T.C. International in 1988.

== Gameplay ==
Bloodbath is a fantasy role-playing game of gory barbarian combat adventures set in the fictional land of Helboria. The game was designed by Troy Christensen and Rick Slawson, with cover art by Jeff and Amanda Dee.

The game components are:

- 24-page 5.5" x 8.5" rulebook
- 8.5" x 11" world map
- 8.5" x 11" hex map
- a sheet of counters

=== Character generation ===
Each character has four attributes: Might, Body Mutilation Capacity (BMC), Bloodlust, and Skill.

=== Combat ===
Players roll dice for initiative, with bonuses applied for Bloodlust. To attack, each character has a movement of six hexes, unless burdened by armor or other encumbrances. The attacker then roll three 6-sided dice, trying to total higher than the defender's applicable talent rating. If the hit is successful, the attacker rolls two 6-sided die for damage, adds the character's Might, as well as any applicable weapon bonus, subtracts the amount of armor the defender is wearing and for Dodge if the defender successfully made a Dodge skill check; the balance is applied against the defender's BMC.

If an attacker scores more than four points of damage, the player references a special Damage Chart for special extra damage that ranges from "Bloody Wound" to "Where's the Mop?"

=== Other information ===
The game also provides information about the fictional world of Hel, as well as monsters and other creatures that inhabit the lands. The rulebook also contains a short sample adventure.

== Further supplements ==
In 1988, T.C. International published a supplement to Bloodbath called Bloodchant.

== Reception ==
Stewart Wieck reviewed Bloodbath in White Wolf #19 (Feb./March, 1990), rating it a 1 out of 5 and stated that "There is nothing in this 20-odd page book which is new to role-playing and, except for a couple pages about the world of Hel, this game offers no information with truly makes it a role-playing game at all. The two-page adventure which is provided is nothing more than a six room citadel inhabited by three different kinds of creatures (all managing to somehow co-exist)."

In the May 1993 edition of Dragon (Issue #193), Lester Smith was ambivalent about Bloodbath, saying "I don't recommend this game for the squeamish." He found the production values "an amateurish production", and the level of writing and editing poor: "the text is full of typographical errors, slipshod sentences, and just plain mistakes." Smith did admit to enjoy reading through the rules, and he did like the combat system. But he concluded, "As a parent, I won’t be sharing the game with my children, and I’d be a bit nervous if I saw them coming home with a copy, just on the basis of its presentation."
