= Merc (role-playing game) =

Tabletop military role-playing game

Merc is a modern combat role-playing game published by Fantasy Games Unlimited (FGU) in 1981.

== Description ==
Merc is a military role-playing system in which the players assume the roles of modern mercenaries engaged in counter-insurgency. The rules cover character creation, specialties (e.g. map expert, medic, escape artist, etc.), action success tests, movement, combat, and vehicles. The boxed set contains:

- a 36-page book
- four cardstock reference sheets
- a plastic transparency
- dice

A short sample adventure set in Rhodesia is included.

== Publication history ==
Merc was published by FGU in 1981 as a boxed set designed by Paul D. Baader, Lawrence Sangee, and Walter Mark, with interior art by Baader, and cover design by Robert Charrette. Two years later, in 1983, FGU published Merc Supplement 1: In Country, which provided more rules for things like vehicles and airborne operations. In 1984, FGU published a second supplement, Campaign Book 1: Rhodesia. No standalone adventures or further supplements were published.

== Reception ==
In the January 1983 edition of The Space Gamer (No. 59), Brian R. Train thought that the game suffered from a lot of ambiguous rules, saying, "This is quite a good game for an (assumed) first effort – I feel its flaws are due basically to not enough development time and design limits. If a later, revised edition of Merc were put out, I would heartily recommend it. As it is, though, I would warn the buyer to 'approach with caution' unless he is already quite familiar with the subject matter, in order to fill in the numerous holes."

In Imagine, Paul Cockburn thought the audience for Merc was limited, saying, "Merc is clearly designed for the gun nut, the sort of role-player who likes to know just how much of a mess his assault rifle will make of a 'soft' target [...] The book is dedicated to 'Mad' Mike Hoare, (Mercenary Extraordinaire) - and I'm sure he'll be delighted."

In the January–February 1984 edition of Different Worlds (Issue 32), William A. Barton found several problems with the rules that he felt should have been caught in the editing and playtesting stages. He also thought the price was "just a bit steep for those not thoroughly committed to modern merc role-playing."

In his 1990 book The Complete Guide to Role-Playing Games, game critic Rick Swan noted that "Merc filled a niche when it was first released, but the subsequent publication of a number of more sophisticated games covering the same ground have rendered it obsolete ... everything Merc does, some other game does better." Swan concluded by giving the game a rating of only 2 out of 4, saying, "Merc is not a bad game, but its day has come and gone."
