= High Seas (Flashing Blades) =

Supplement for Flashing Blades

High Seas is a 1985 role-playing game supplement published by Fantasy Games Unlimited for Flashing Blades.

== Contents ==
High Seas is a supplement in which New World and maritime adventures are allowed. It introduces six New World character backgrounds (rogue, gentleman, soldier, marine, sailor, pirate) with new skills and mechanics. Rules cover shipboard combat, ranks, piracy, trade, and shipbuilding, including a Ruthlessness rating that affects crew morale and reputation. The supplement also features a mini-campaign with four adventures: "Scavenger's Daughter" (forced into piracy), "Pike's Trove" (treasure hunt), "Guede-Je-Rouge" (voodoo curse), and "Portobelo" (Spanish treasure raid).

High Seas is supplement which provides rules usable with pirate and privateer characters, covering shipbuilding, trade, and naval combat, as well as adventure conditions on the Spanish Main. The supplement includes four short adventure scenarios.

== Publication history ==
High Seas was written by Mark Pettigrew and published by Fantasy Games Unlimited in 1985 as a 40-page book.

== Reception ==
Sean Holland reviewed High Seas for Different Worlds magazine and stated that "I am quite impressed with High Seas as the author has managed to put so much useful information in such an inexpensive book. So if you play Flashing Blades, and you wish to expand your game, hoist the Jolly Roger and buy High Seas."
