= Break In At Three Kilometer Island =

Role-playing game adventure

Break In At Three Kilometer Island is a 1981 role-playing game adventure for Villains and Vigilantes published by Judges Guild.

== Plot summary ==
Break In At Three Kilometer Island is an adventure in which the Four Fiends supervillain group led by genius Helen Retro, breaks into the Three Kilometer Island nuclear power plant to steal the new substance Asimtote.

== Reception ==
William A. Barton reviewed Break In At Three Kilometer Island in The Space Gamer No. 44. Barton commented that "Break In At Three Kilometer Island, while not perfect, still should provide V&Vers with enough in the way of adventure – especially with GM elaborations – to make it well worth the price."
