= Advanced Phantasm Adventures =

Fantasy RPG from 1992

Advanced Phantasm Adventures is a fantasy role-playing game published by T.C. International in 1992.

== Publication history ==
A role-playing game system called Phantasm Adventures was released in 1988, and according to the publisher, was "the biggest fantasy game in Japan." In 1992, T.C. International released an updated version called Advanced Phantasm Adventures. Designed by Troy Christensen, it consists of two coil-bound books: a 112-page Player's Handbook, and a 96-page Gamemaster's Handbook.

== Gameplay ==
=== Character generation ===
Players can choose from one of fifty-five different races. Nine base abilities have both a fixed racial stat and a personal stat (generated by rolling two 10-sided dice and consulting a table). Players then choose a deity and clan background. Each player receives a set number of experience points with which to purchase skills, certain skills being required by certain professions. Dice are rolled to determine starting money in order to buy initial equipment. The player then chooses three personal goals from a list, which will affect how experience points are gained.

=== Magic ===
The player decides from which "realm" their character's casting ability is derived, such as key phrases, gestures, special objects, etc., and also how fast energy is regenerated, the length of casting time and chances of success. The player then chooses the circle of magic, which will define which spells the caster can choose.

=== Ability resolution ===
To resolve the use of an ability against an opponent, both multiply their respective racial base and personal stats, with the larger number winning.

=== Combat ===
During combat, each character can choose one of three different initiatives, for melee, missile or magical combat; these are determined by rolling a 10-sided die and adding the result to the character initiative number for that type of combat. Attacks are rolled on a 20-sided die.

=== Skill resolution ===
Each skill check has a possibility of a critical success or critical failure.

== Reception ==
In the May 1993 edition of Dragon (Issue #193), Lester Smith thought that the game system was very flexible and "rather exciting", leading to a great deal of personal choice during character generation. Hower, Smith found the production values of the books to be low, and the game system overall to be "a number-intensive product, particularly in terms of character generation, and one that requires quite a bit of rules reference during play." Smith concluded with a thumbs down, saying, "I'm glad to have had the chance to peruse this game... But I can't really recommend it as a finished product."
