= Carol Kalish =

American editor and sales manager (1955–1991)

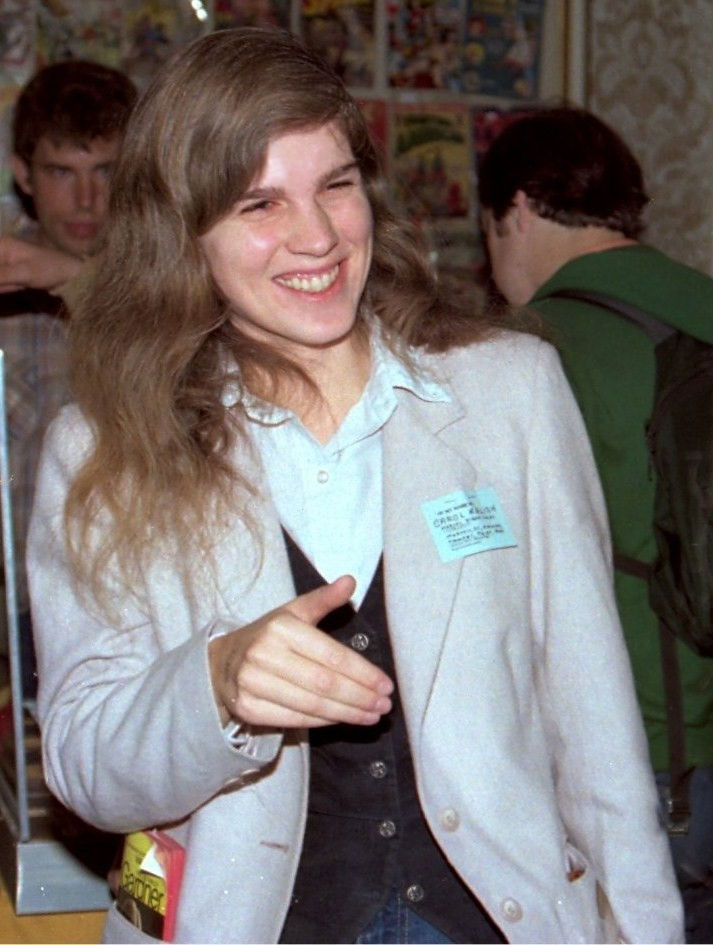
- Carol Kalish at the October 1982; Minneapolis Comic-Con
- Born: February 14, 1955
- Died: September 5, 1991 (aged 36)
- Notable works: Vice President of New Product Development, Marvel Comics
- Awards: Inkpot Award, 1991; ComicsPRO 2010 Industry Appreciation Award (posthumous)

Carol Kalish (February 14, 1955 – September 5, 1991) was an American writer, editor, comic book retailer, and sales manager. She worked as Direct Sales Manager and Vice President of New Product Development at Marvel Comics from 1981 to 1991. She is credited with pioneering the American comics direct market when it was in its adolescence, in part through a program wherein Marvel helped pay for comic book stores to acquire cash registers.

She was the winner of an Inkpot Award in 1991, and in 2010 was posthumously awarded the first ComicsPRO Industry Appreciation Award, beating nominees such as Will Eisner, Julius Schwartz and Phil Seuling.

== Early life ==
Carol was born to Michael and Molly Kalish on February 14, 1955, when her parents were overseas in Thailand. She had one elder sister named Candace. She graduated from Radcliffe College with Honors in Geology and a specialty in History. From the age of three, she was fascinated by dinosaurs, which may explain her devotion to Jack Kirby's creation Devil Dinosaur.

Kalish was a childhood friend of writer Paul Dini, who credits her with introducing him to the character Wonder Woman when they were children.

== Career ==
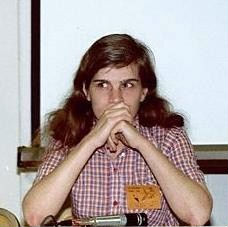
Carol Kalish, on a Women In Comics panel in 1982.

Kalish worked as a comic book retailer and wholesaler. Kalish's first work in circulation was two years as circulation manager on the science fiction publication Galileo, which folded in early 1980. This led her (and her partner Richard Howell) to dual positions with Hal Schuster's New Media/Irjax: co-editors of New Media Publishing's brand-new hobbyist publication, Comics Feature, and running the Schuster-owned Boston-area distributor Solar Spice and Liquors (named after a fictional corporation created by science fiction writer Poul Anderson).

In 1982, she began working at Marvel, having been hired by Ed Shukin, Marvel's Vice President in charge of sales. She was known as Marvel's "Mistress of Propaganda," and "discovered" Alex Ross and Peter David, who worked with Kalish as Assistant Sale Manager in Marvel Comics' Sales Department, along with Sandy Schechter.

Beginning in the mid-1980s, Kalish spearheaded the expansion of the Marvel's distribution into theretofore unexplored retail outlets, including major bookstores such as B. Dalton and Waldenbooks.

Kalish also conducted numerous trips to comic book shops during the course of her work and on her vacation time, during which she would offer advice to retailers on how to improve their stores. During these visits, Kalish consistently observed the absence of cash registers on the part of retailers, and was inspired to originate Marvel's cash register program, with which the company would subsidize, at bulk cost, registers for retailers, which is credited with positively affecting the level of professionalism of the direct market.

According to a March 2010 piece by retailer and Comic Book Resources columnist Brian Hibbs:

Once upon a time Marvel, under Carol's DM sales team, was the most DM-friendly publisher. The cash register program, rack credits via the IADD, effective and scrupulous solicitations, these were all things that happened under Carol's watch. In fact, I'll still always remember being 16 years old, working at another person's store, and Carol was in town for a vacation, and she took the time to come in and make a half-dozen practical and direct suggestions as to how that store could be made better; not specifically for Marvel, but just a better store in general. That was a powerful memory for me, and the lessons that Carol taught us have stuck with me all of these years later. I thought, "that's how I want to be when I grow up", and I am, frankly, personally embarrassed that current Marvel management isn't willing to live up to her legacy, and engage the people who sell their comics for them, and represent them to the buying public.

Kalish also set the official Marvel direct sales policy regarding retailer orders of back issue stock, emphasizing to retailers that they should order only what they could sell within a month's time, and not order additional copies intended solely for back stock, as this would merely tie up their money. Although this was considered "heresy" at the time, Kalish advised retailers that was far wiser to keep capital available for the flow of new comics coming into stores.

It was during Kalish's tenure in Marvel Sales that copies of the company's adaptation of the 1983 film Return of the Jedi was discovered by actor Mark Hamill on sale a month prior to the release of the film. After Hamill alerted Lucasfilm, Marvel, according to Kalish, swiftly recalled the book off the stands. Though none of the three people in the Sales Department were fired over the incident, it resulted in premature revelation of the secrets of the film's plot.

During the last year or so of her life, Kalish developed a line of religious books, Civil War comics, and "greeting card" comics to expand Marvel's market. She was also preparing to leave Marvel to start her own publishing firm.

== Personal life ==
Kalish's life partner was comics writer/artist Richard Howell. They lived in Leonia, New Jersey.

== Death and legacy ==
Kalish died on September 5, 1991, from a pulmonary embolism, at the age 36.

Tributes to Kalish included a memorial service arranged by Marvel Comics president Terry Stewart and a lengthy eulogy by Peter David in the Comics Buyer's Guide, in which David credited Kalish with making him a comics industry professional. The outpouring of grief over her death seen in the letters pages of CBG was theretofore unprecedented and came from fans and her professional colleagues alike.

Fantagraphics publisher Gary Groth, however, was less effusive. Although respectful of Kalish's personal qualities, Groth considered that these were not always used for the best of purposes: "Kalish, who I have no reason to believe was anything other than decent and personable in her personal relations, devoted her professional life to expanding the hegemonic power of a corporation that already owns all the distributors and most of the retailers...."

Groth's piece led to outrage on the part of Kalish's friend and former co-worker, writer Peter David, who named his youngest daughter after Kalish, and found Groth's piece to be "vicious." He retaliated by parodying Groth as Louis Lance, a snobbish publisher of the only comics he considers to be "true art", who looks down on superhero comics published by large, work-for-hire companies, in a fictitious panel discussion that David ran in "Snob Appeal", an edition of his then-weekly column, "But I Digress..." in Comics Buyer's Guide. David also took issue with attacks on Kalish by Mile High Comics retailer and columnist Chuck Rozanski.

When Glenn Hauman, the webmaster of David's website, reprinted David's eulogy to Kalish on David's site in 2002, along with a request to the site's visitors to link heavily to the post in order to displace Groth's 1991 piece as the top search result on Google, Comics Journal online editor Dirk Deppey defended Groth's 1991 piece, saying that it had not been directed at Kalish personally, but at her work for a corporation and at the deep sorrow expressed by David and the CBG letter writers, which Groth and Deppey characterized as trite and inarticulate "beatification."

In 2010, Kalish was awarded the first ComicsPRO Industry Appreciation Award in the posthumous category, a "Hall of Fame"-type award that was created to honor behind-the-scenes publishing personnel for helping to promote the comics market, beating fellow nominees Will Eisner, Phil Seuling and Julius Schwartz. The award was accepted by Richard Howell on her behalf. Though Howell was not present at the ceremony, writer/editor Paul Levitz read a statement by Howell, who stated that Kalish's goal was "to make the direct market as strong as it could be". In 2018, Kalish was voted into the Will Eisner Hall of Fame. Paul Dini accepted the award on her behalf.

== Awards ==
- 1991 Inkpot Award
- 2010 ComicsPRO Industry Appreciation Award (posthumous category)
- 2018 Will Eisner Hall of Fame (jury's choice)
