= Bloodchant =

Supplement published by T.C. International

Bloodchant is a supplement published by T.C. International in 1988 for the gory barbarian combat role-playing game Bloodbath.

== Gameplay ==
Bloodchant was designed by Troy Christensen, with interior art by Amanda Dee, Mike Semsel and Mike Barnes, and cover art by Amanda Dee. The boxed set contains:

- 5.5" x 8.5" rulebook
- 8.5" x 11" world map
- 8.5" x 11" hex map
- a sheet of counters

This supplement uses the rules system first published in Bloodbath, and focuses on magic.

== Reception ==
Stewart Wieck reviewed Bloodchant in White Wolf #19 (Feb./March, 1990), rating it a 1 out of 5 and stated that "even with the extra space, TCI makes no attempt present anything other than a game of combat."

In the May 1993 edition of Dragon (Issue #193), Lester Smith reviewed both Bloodchant and its parent game Bloodbath. He had been ambivalent about Bloodbath, and said of Bloodchant that it was "no better or worse than its predecessor." He still found the level of writing and editing as poor in this product as it had been in Bloodbath, saying, "The text is still barbaric (pun intended.)" He concluded, "As a parent, I won’t be sharing the game with my children, and I’d be a bit nervous if I saw them coming home with a copy, just on the basis of its presentation."
