= Flashing Blades =

1984 swashbuckling role-playing game

Flashing Blades is a swashbuckling role-playing game published by Fantasy Games Unlimited (FGU) in 1984 that emulates "The Three Musketeers" in 17th-century France.

== Description ==
In Flashing Blades, players take on the roles of 17th-century French swashbucklers similar to D'Artagnan. In order to create a character, the player first chooses a character class, either soldier, gentleman, rogue or noble; each class has benefits and drawbacks. Each character also has an Advantage such as Contact in High Places, as well as a Secret such as Compulsive Gambling. The player rounds out the character by assigning skill points.

During play, players seek to take actions that will increase their social status while avoiding circumstances that will lower their social status, since social status plays an important part of the game.

The boxed set comes with a 48-page book titled "Rogues, Gentlemen, Soldiers and Noblemen" that explains the rules. There is also a 16-page book with three sample adventures, and a gamemaster's screen.

== Publication history ==
Flashing Blades was designed by Mark Pettigrew, and was published in 1984 by FGU with illustrations by Bill Cucinotta, Rich Rankin, Neil Vokes, and Matt Wagner. The game was translated into French by Michel Serrat and was published in France under the title Les Trois Mousquetaires.

In 1985, William H. Keith Jr. and J. Andrew Keith expanded into FGU's game lines including Flashing Blades.

Supplements included An Ambassador's Tales (1985), The Cardinal's Peril (1984), High Seas (1985), and Parisian Adventure (1985).

== Reception ==
Dave Nalle, writing for Abyss, found the game to be "compact and well organized. Character set-up is simple, covered in a bit over a page." Nalle felt that the result was "a good, playable game system with a bit too much die rolling but a clear sense that restrictive mechanics are there to be ignored when appropriate." Nalle concluded, "I heartily recommend Flashing Blades to gamers interested in the swashbuckling setting ... It is certainty the best game on this period published to date."

In Issue 2 of Adventurer, T.H. Zinder found the box art unattractive and the components "dull" compared with other recent games. But Zinder thought "the rules are clear and easy to read" and the game was "elegant in its simple yet sophisticated mechanics." Zinder felt that the focus of the game, the fencing rules, "reproduces duelling with foils and rapiers in a wonderful manner." He also felt that "17th century France is detailed in the meticulous fashion that we've come to expect from FGU. A comprehensive survey of the social customs, dress, politics, major figures, 16th and 17th century history and maps of Europe, France and Paris concludes with a bibliography of the major sources used." Zinder concluded with a positive recommendation, saying, "Flashing Blades is a professional, well-written game with none of the excessive numbers that most games have ... Its coverage of 17th century France details a rich and exciting society in which players can live, love, intrigue and. hopefully, succeed."

Sean Holland reviewed Flashing Blades for Different Worlds magazine and stated that "So, in summary, if you like the adventures of the Three Musketeers, and other swashbucklers, buy the game. If not, at least take a look, it might change your mind."

In Issue 40 of the French games magazine Jeux & Stratégie, Michel Brassinne did not get a good first impression from the illustrations, "which do not convey the eventful and colorful atmosphere of swashbuckling films." But once past that, Brassinne found "that we hold in our hands all the ingredients of an excellent role-playing game, which, moreover, has managed to find the humor and good nature of these famous films." He did warn that "this game is not aimed at beginners due to the complexity of certain rules and the emphasis on playing the characters' roles in a 17th century setting. Lots of role-playing experience is needed to appreciate this game's true value." Brassinnne concluded by giving this game only 3 out of 10 for Presentation, 7s for both Clarity of Rules and Originality, and a top rating for his overall impression.

In his 1990 book The Complete Guide to Role-Playing Games, game critic Rick Swan called Flashing Blades "the best-ever RPG of its kind." Swan especially liked the Advantage and Secret possessed by each character, writing that these "steer adventures in unexpected directions, and also encourage the players to pursue their own agendas, often at the expense of their comrades." Swan found the game mechanics "detailed but not overly complicated" and the combat system "flexible ... without the burden of endless computations." He did caution that the game was "perhaps a bit too dependent on the referee to interpret some of the fuzzier rules." Swan concluded by giving the game a rating of 3 out of 4, saying, "The game isn't for everyone, but for those with an interest in the era, Flashing Blades is as good as it gets."
