= Skull & Crossbones (role-playing game) =

Tabletop pirate role-playing game

Skull & Crossbones is a role-playing game published by Fantasy Games Unlimited (FGU) in 1980 in which players take on the roles of pirates.

== Description ==
Skull & Crossbones is a pirate role-playing system set in the Caribbean during the late 17th century. The rulebook covers character creation, man-to-man and ship-to-ship combat, encounter tables, non-player characters, and more. The game includes ship-deck plans in 25mm miniatures scale and a campaign map of the Spanish Main.

Characters can be navigators, gunners and "other seafaring types."

== Publication history ==
Skull & Crossbones was designed by Gerald D. Seypura and Anthony LeBoutillier and published by FGU in 1980 as a boxed set with two 32-page books, two maps, three cardstock sheets, counters, and special skull dice.

The supplement Pieces of Eight was also published in 1980.

== Reception ==
In Issue 35 of The Space Gamer, Aaron Allston commented that "Skull & Crossbones might be useful as an introductory RPG for gaming beginners, but many others on the market are superior in that respect. We'll have to wait a while longer for adequate sea-going role-play."

Michael Blum reviewed Skull & Crossbones for Different Worlds magazine and stated that "Skull & Crossbones is a reasonable investment for the GM who wants to run a pirate campaign in the classic Caribbean period. The ship drawings and maps are very useful, while the rules themselves should provide at very least a strong base on which to construct a campaign."

In his 1990 book The Complete Guide to Role-Playing Games, game critic Rick Swan thought that this game "tries to cram too much into too little space." Swan found the game systems "derivative, and nothing is explored in detail ... sea encounters, tips for staging adventures, and other crucial elements are all but ignored." Swan gave the game a poor rating of only 1.5 out of 4. However, Swan noted that the supplement Pieces of Eight "fleshes out the original game ... it goes a long way toward making Skull and Crossbones a playable game."

In his 1991 book Heroic Worlds, Lawrence Schick called the game system "unimpressive".
