= Pieces of Eight (Skull & Crossbones) =

Role-playing game supplement

Pieces of Eight is a 1980 role-playing game supplement for Skull & Crossbones, published by Fantasy Games Unlimited.

== Contents ==
Pieces of Eight is a supplement containing expansion rules for topics such as voodoo, guidelines for doctors, and ships rules, as well as three adventure scenarios.

== Reception ==
Aaron Allston reviewed Pieces of Eight in The Space Gamer No. 39. Allston commented that "Recommended to those who have bought and liked the original RPG. Consider, though: if Skull and Crossbones is akin to a 16-chapter book with 8 chapters missing, and each of these supplements provides 1 or 2 of the missing chapters, this will become an expensive game."

In his 1990 book The Complete Guide to Role-Playing Games, game critic Rick Swan called the game Skull and Crossbones "a sketchy treatment of role-playing" due to the many gaps in its rules and campaign background, but recommended to anyone interested in playing the game that Pieces of Eight was necessary since it "fleshes out the original game ... it goes a long way toward making Skull and Crossbones a playable game."
