= 1995 National Rugby Championships =

Tournament details
- Tournament format(s): Various
- Date: 1995

Tournament statistics

Final

The 1995 National Rugby Championships were a series of tournaments organized by the United States RFU to determine a national champion in several divisions for United States rugby teams. The divisions included club, college, high school, military, sevens, all–stars and local union.

== Men's Club ==
The 1995 USA Rugby National Club Championship took place at Zilker Park in Austin, TX from May 27–29. The teams featured in the tournament were the champions of the four sub unions of USARFU. The three day tournament also included the Division II club championship, Western 7's, and a match between Royal Air Force and U.S. Combined Services. Potomac A.C. won its first national title by defeating OMBAC in the final.

Regional Semifinal
April 29 - Long Beach, CA
OMBAC	30
Belmont Shore	23
April 30 - Seattle, WA
Old Blues	58
Seattle	15
May 13 - Cincinnati, OH
Palmer College	20
Scioto Valley	12
May 13 - Cincinnati, OH
Chicago Lions	31
Cincinnati Wolfhounds	18
May 6 - Dallas, TX
Dallas Harlequins	65
Omaha GOATS	13
May 6 - Dallas, TX
Kansas City Blues	18
Denver Barbarians	16
December 3 - Orlando, FL
Potomac AC	24
Life Chiropractic	9
December 3 - Orlando, FL
Old Blue	65
Charlotte	9

Regional Final
May 13 - San Francisco, CA
OMBAC	24
Old Blues	8
May 14 - Cincinnati, OH
Palmer College	27
Chicago Lions	8
May 7 - Dallas, TX
Dallas Harlequins	30
Kansas City Blues	8
December 4 - Orlando, FL
Potomac AC	25
Old Blue	19

National Semifinal
May 27 - Austin, TX
OMBAC	51
Palmer College	12
May 27 - Austin, TX
Dallas Harlequins	12
Potomac AC	16

National Final
May 29 - Austin, TX
OMBAC	12
Potomac AC	16
Third place
May 29 - Austin, TX
Dallas Harlequins	34
Palmer College	24

=== Semifinals ===
27 May 1995
11:45AM

OMBAC	51–12	Palmer College
Try: Jon Lee 14', 2H' c Duncan Lumsden 18'; Dennis Gonzalez 25'; George Conahey; Joe Santos 2H' c, 78' c Con: Jason McVeigh (5); Pen: Jason McVeigh 12', 1H'		Try: Chad Zeh; Tony Eden c Con: Leon Taylor

Austin, TX
Referee: Ed Sorenson (Potomac)

27 May 1995
3:15PM

Potomac A.C.	16–12	Dallas Harlequins
Try: Mike Fabling 60' c Con: Mike Fabling; Pen: Mike Fabling (3)		Pen: Mark Gale 42', 48', 55', 72'

Austin, TX
Referee: Jerry McLemore (Mid–South)

=== Third place ===
29 May 1995
11:00AM

Dallas Harlequins	34–24	Palmer College
Try: Jim Aston c Mike Waterman 42' c Peter Jones c Lenny Snaft c Con: Mark Gale; Pen: Mark Gale 72', 79'; Drop: Neil Williams 75'		Try: Jeff Yadlosky 10' c Ian Woods 25' c Tony Chappie 70' c Con: Leon Taylor; Pen: Leon Taylor 39'

Austin, TX
Referee: Kevin Handley (New England)

=== Final ===
29 May 1995
2:00PM

Potomac A.C.	16–12	OMBAC
Try: Reza Amirkhalili 21' c Con: Mike Fabling; Pen: Mike Fabling 25', 63', 75'		Pen: Jason McVeigh 2', 10', 32', 2H'

Austin, TX
Attendance: 1500
Referee: Tony Spreadbury (Bath)

Champions: Potomac Athletic Club
President: Quentin Lawson
Coach/Captain: Scott Keith (#8)
Roster: Reza Amirkhalili (Flanker), Steve Amitay (Hooker), Joe Bellote (Prop), Manus Cooney (Lock), Mike Fabling (Flyhalf), Dave Farling (Wing), Fusi Feaunati (Center), Bill Fisher (Lock), Leo Fitzsimon (Flanker), Lance French (Center), Tom Kenney (Scrumhalf), Tom Lyons (Wing), Brendan Malloy (Lock), John Malloy (Lock), Robert Obrist (Prop), Brian O'Sullivan (Center), Bill Ogilvie (#8), Michael Orbell (Center), Dean Orbell (Scrumhalf), Jim Richards (Hooker), Chris Schricte (Flanker), August Schricte (Wing), Graeme Thomson (Scrumhalf), John Trauth (Prop), Jim Trump (Prop), Phil Vivaldi (Center), Tom Williams (Center).

== Club Division II ==
The 1995 National Division II Championship was the hosted by the Austin Huns and held May 27–29 at Zilker Park in Austin, TX. The University of Michigan club of California was the champion.
Tournament MVP was Santa Rosa flyhalf Greg DeJoux.

Regional Semifinal
May 13 - Nashville, TN
Michigan	49
Wisconsin Madison	24
May 13 - Nashville, TN
Nashville	26
Chicago Blaze	6
December 3 - Orlando, FL
Burlington	11
Frederick	9
December 3 - Orlando, FL
Augusta	18
Battleship	33
San Fernando
SoCal League Winner
April 30 - Seattle, WA
Santa Rosa	20
Old Gaels	5
May 6 - Dallas, TX
Topeka	30
Denton	12
May 6 - Dallas, TX
Austin Huns	32
Kohlfield Scorpions	0

Regional Final
May 14 - Nashville, TN
Michigan	11
Nashville	10
December 4 - Orlando, FL
Burlington	29
Battleship	3
May 14 - San Francisco, CA
San Fernando	10
Santa Rosa	6
May 7 - Dallas, TX
Topeka	38
Austin Huns	7

National Semifinal
May 27 - Austin, TX
Michigan	24
Burlington	22
May 27 - Austin, TX
San Fernando	20
Topeka	5

National Final
May 29 - Austin, TX
Michigan	46
San Fernando	27
Third place
May 29 - Austin, TX
Burlington	17
Topeka	10

Semifinals

27 May 1995
10:00AM

Michigan	24–22	Burlington
Try: Mike Carter 11' c Dave Perpich 27' c Chris Collins 47' c Con: Sean Knight; Pen: Sean Knight 72'		Try: Josh Henkin 57' c Rob Sinkewicz 64' c, 79'; Con: Owen Banks; Pen: Owen Banks 41'

Austin, TX
Referee: David Hooper (Texas)

27 May 1995
1:30PM

San Fernando Valley	20–5	Topeka Wizards
Try: Tasi Mounga 60' c Ben Harrell c Con: Marcelo Sala; Pen: Marcelo Sala 23', 64'		Try: Randy Jordan 42'

Austin, TX
Referee: Mike Geach (Texas)

Third place

29 May 1995
9:30AM

Burlington	17–10	Topeka Wizards
Try: Mark Kagan c Josh Henkin c Con: Owen Banks; Pen: Owen Banks		Try: Randy Jordan; Chris Sieffert

Austin, TX
Referee: Richard Prim (Texas)

Final

29 May 1995
12:30PM

Michigan	46–27	San Fernando Valley
Try: Michael Carter 22' c, 2H', 2H' c Patrick Muscat 28' c Chris Collis 36' c, 79' c Con: Sean Knight; Pen: Sean Knight 39', 65'		Try: Chris Vivian 4' c Tasi Mounga c Andrew Shanks 60' c Con: Marcelo Sala; Pen: Marcelo Sala 30', 70'

Austin, TX
Referee: Josh Tameifuna (S. California)

Champions: University of Michigan
Coach: Mr. MacArthur
Roster: Deron Albright (Prop), Joseph Attia (Flanker), Michael Carter (Wing), Andrew Colburn (Flanker), Chris Collis (Wing), Scott Crisler (Fullback), Lee Gray (Lock), James Kennedy (Lock), Ashby Kinch (Center), Sean Knight (Scrumhalf), Lou Lafayette (Prop), Paul Lund (Hooker), Patrick Muscat (Hooker), Marc Nemec (Flyhalf), Brett Peck (Center), David Perpich (#8), Evan Pratt (Flanker/#8), Jeffrey Sharritts (Fullback), Ed Spybrook (Prop), John Swis (Flanker), Tom Warburton (Center), Brian Williamson (Flanker), Brian Zimmer (Prop), Kevin Zimmer (Lock).

== Women's Club ==
The 1995 Women's National Rugby Championship was a twelve team tournament and played at Langenberg Fields in St. Louis, MO on May 27–28. The Bay Area Shehawks won the title by defeating Berkeley All Blues 10–8.

PLATE DIVISION
Semifinals
Chicago 17–0 Southeast
Puget Sound Breakers 34–0 Houston Herricanes

Third place
Southeast 31–0 Houston Herricanes

Final

28 May 1995

Chicago	17–0	Puget Sound Breakers
Try: Meredith Horn; Alicia Matthews; Jill Rees; Con: Pat Standley

St. Louis, MO

Lineups:
Chicago– Levi, Wilk, Kreevich, Shelton, Laskey, Pauel, Seabaugh, Begg, Horn, Standley, Matthews, Hensen, Rees, Klujian, Frey.
Puget Sound Breakers– Kirk, Carlson–Rink, Morgan, Hahler, Shawn, Brooks, Ossman, Barrett, Kaspic, Carlton, Reynolds, Tshchiya, Eckert, Clarkson, Sporleder.

MVPs
Back– Pat Standley (Chicago)
Forward– MJ Mohl (Southeast)
Honorable Mention– Kim Cyganik (Southeast), Sue Brooks (Puget Sound)

CUP CHAMPIONSHIP
Quarterfinals

27 May 1995

Bay Area She Hawks	15–5	New Orleans Halfmoons

St. Louis, MO

27 May 1995

Berkeley All Blues	51–0	Ozark Ladies

St. Louis, MO

27 May 1995

Beantown	27–5	Twin City Amazons

St. Louis, MO

27 May 1995

Minnesota	10–0	Boston

St. Louis, MO

Semifinals

27 May 1995

Bay Area Shehawks	48–0	Minnesota Valkyries

St. Louis, MO

27 May 1995

Berkeley All Blues	10–0	Beantown
Try: Kim Green 64'; Allison Pappe 69'

St. Louis, MO

Third place

28 May 1995

Beantown	13–7	Minnesota

St. Louis, MO

Final

28 May 1995

Bay Area Shehawks	10–8	Beantown
Try: Rachel Jackson 2'; Laurie Karcher		Try: Tess Koleczek 17'; Pen: Kim Cobb

St. Louis, MO

Lineups:
Bay Area SheHawks– Marti Watts (Coach), Greene, Craig, Wadford, Burrows, Lubisch, Schnapp, Waarvzk, Bukowski, Flores, Robb, Jackson, Pappe, Crawford, Green, Mitchell.
Berkeley All Blues– Kuiken, Pepper, Weix, Surr, Feigenbutz, Koleczek, Meredith, Bond, Kelly, Bergmann, Cote, Bowler, Karcher, Zdarko, Gutierrez.

MVPs
Back– Kathi Flores (Berkeley)
Forward– Sandy Meredith (Shehawks)
Honorable Mention– Kerry Kelly (Shehawks), Patti Connell (Beantown)

== College ==
The 1995 College championship was won by UC Berkeley with a win over Air Force. Princeton won the second edition of the Women's Collegiate Championship. The College All–Star Championship was won by the Pacific Coast while the East was runner–up.

== Military ==
The 1995 Interservice Rugby Championship was held at the Pensacola Naval Air Station in Florida from 7 to 9 September. The teams involved were select sides of each service branch. From these teams a selection was made to field the Combined Services Rugby team for tours. Army won the championship over the Marines.

Results:

Round Robin					Scores				
Rank	Standings	Pld	W	L	ARM	MAR	NAV	AIR	COA
1.	Army	4	4	0	X	37:21	20:10	40:8	32:3
2.	Marines	4	2	2	21:37	X	22:3	13:17	40:0
3.	Navy	4	2	2	10:20	3:22	X	10:8	35:0
4.	Air Force	4	2	2	8:40	17:13	8:10	X	18:5
5.	Coast Guard	4	0	4	3:32	0:40	0:35	5:18	X

Wooden Spoon
Coast Guard

Third place

9 September 1995
9:00AM

Navy	25–18	Air Force

Pensacola, FL

Championship

9 September 1995
10:45AM

Army	49–0	Marines
Try: Rob Schuster 5' c, 18' c Chris Wunsch 10' c Jim Kostecki; Mike Legg c Chip Curtis c Con: Bill Marshall; Pen: Bill Marshall (3)

Pensacola, FL

Lineups:
Army– Jonathan Petrucelli (Shoemacher), L. Borkowski, D. Snodgrass, E.J. Hall (Pero), D. Flaherty, Mike Legg, Chris Wunsch, K. Hyneman (Neumann), Jim Kostecki, M. Micheles, Chip Curtis, V. Torza, G. Yarnall, B. Marshall, R. Schuster
Marines– B. Lewis, D. Schill, K. Caulk (Randall), C. Helfmann (Starling), W. Clapp (Dwyer), P. Murphy, S. Pelham, B. Bensch, A. Dechario, M. Mulcahy (Canevara), M. Evergin, B. Bekken, D. Hoffman, C. Bolden, J. Pooler.

== Sevens ==
Club
The 1995 National Club Sevens championship, was played at A.A. Garthwaite Field in Conshohocken, PA from 19 to 20 August. There were eight teams featured which included two representatives from each of the four territorial unions. Metropolis and Michigan Wolverines qualified from the Midwest. Northern Virginia and Washington qualified from the East. OMBAC and Tongan Yankees represented the Pacific Coast. Arlington and Kansas City Blues represented the West. OMBAC defeated the Northern Virginia to win the championship. Malakai Delai of OMBAC was the MVP.

Pool 1 Northern Virginia 26-17 OMBAC
Metropolis 21-14 Northern Virginia
OMBAC 35-23 Metropolis
OMBAC 24-21 Kansas City Blues
Metropolis 28-24 Kansas City Blues
Northern Virginia W–L Kansas City Blues

Pool 2
Washington (3–0)
Tongan Yankees (2nd)
Michigan
Arlington

Fifth place
Metropolis 24-17 Arlington

Semifinals
OMBAC 22-14 Washington
Northern Virginia W–L Tongan Yankees

Final
OMBAC 35-19 Northern Virginia

All Star
The 1995 National All-Star Sevens rugby tournament was an eight team tournament with two representatives from each territory. The other purpose of the tournament was to select members for the U.S. Eagles Seven–a–side team. This year's tournament took place at A.A. Garthwaite Field in Conshohocken, PA from 19 to 20 August. The East I team won the final 38–5 over the Midwest I team. Tom Brewer was named All-Star MVP.

Pool 1
East 1 (3–0)
Midwest 1 (2nd)
Pacific 2
West 2

Pool 2
East 2 (2–1)
West 1 (2–1)
Pacific 1 (2–1)
Midwest 2 (0–3)

Semifinals
East 1 W–L West 1
Midwest 1 W–L East 2

Championship
East 1 38-5 Midwest 1

== Women's All–Star ==
The ninth edition of the Women's All–Star championship was hosted by the New Orleans rugby club and played at St. Julian Eymard rugby and soccer complex from December 3–4 in New Orleans, LA. The competition was also used to select players US Eagles Women's team. The East came in first winning all three games.

3 December 1994

East	17–5	Midwest
Try: Patty Jervey 5', 75' c, 79'; Con: MacIntosh		Try: Michele Boyer 80'

New Orleans, LA
Referee: Bob Hamilton

3 December 1994

Pacific Coast	29–24	West
Try: Pam Irby 3', 1H', 21' c, 73' c Lisa Sterman 40'; Con: Shelly Baker		Try: Kim Turner c Laura Cabrera; Con: Chris Miskec; Pen: Chris Miskec (3); Tania Hahn

New Orleans, LA
Referee: Jerry McLemore

3 December 1994

Pacific Coast	17–10	Midwest
Try: Pam Irby 11' c Jill Schooler; Kim Wilson; Con: Rachel Jackson		Try: Ottens reserve #18

New Orleans, LA
Referee: Bob Hamilton

3 December 1994

East	24–0	West
Try: Brett Newton 13' c Rebecca Regan; Leslie Bonnyman c Patty Jervey; Con: Kim Cyganik

New Orleans, LA
Referee: Scott Miller

4 December 1994

Midwest	20–12	West
Try: Margo Machen; Marie Blanchard; Gwen Gunter; Samantha Fales		Try: Kim Turner 51'; Laura Cabrera 66' c Con: Chris Miskec

New Orleans, LA
Referee: Scott Miller

4 December 1994

Pacific Coast	3–27	East
Pen: Rachel Jackson 55'		Try: Jan Rutkowski 5'; Candi Orsini 25'; Brett Newton 37'; Beth Fordyce 69'; Anita Pease c Con: Bronnie Mackintosh

New Orleans, LA
Referee: Jerry McLemore

Champions: East
Roster: Colleen Fahey, Karen Kapusta, M.A. Sorenson, Pam Heimann, Rachel Kenyon, Kris Kany, Kerry Kilander, Alex Williams, Beth Fordyce, Bronnie Mackintosh, Patty Jervey, Dana Teagarden, Candi Orsini, Sue Parker, Leslie Bonnyman, Karen Perry, Carmenita Signes, Michelle Cooley, L.J. Stevenson, Jennifer Renne, Heather Lambert, Nancy Fitz, Rebecca Regan, Kim Cyganik, Anita Pease, Brett Newton, Jan Rutkowski.

== Local Union ==
The 1995 National Local Union Championship took place in Lemont, IL from June 10–11. This tournament featured Local Union champions competing in two brackets. The Round Robin bracket included the Chicago Area RFU, Florida and Indiana. The Championship bracket included Michigan, Ohio, Ozark, and Rio Grande. Chicago Area won the Round Robin while Michigan won the Championship.

ROUND ROBIN

10 June 1995

Chicago Area	29–25	Indiana
Try: Zdenovec; Santiago; Graf; Chevalier; Jay Rizzo 79'		Try: Treiloff; Greeniez; Blume; Drop: Harding

Lemont, IL
Referee: A. Klemp

10 June 1995

Chicago Area	7–6	Florida
Try: penalty try c Con: (1)		Con: (2)

Lemont, IL
Referee: J. Turner

11 June 1995

Florida	6–5	Indiana
Pen: Ralph Gonzalez (2)		Try: Jeff Van Gordon

Lemont, IL
Referee: P. Meredith

CHAMPIONSHIP BRACKET
Semifinals

10 June 1995

Michigan	18–15	Ozark
Try: Leask; Wihongi; Pen: Neal Whitfield		Try: Phillips; Schindler

Lemont, IL
Referee: P. Meredith

10 June 1995

Ohio	25–5	Rio Grande
Try: Tony Conczak; Con: Tony Conczak (2); Pen: Tony Conczak (2)		Try: (1)

Lemont, IL
Referee: Pearce Higgins (Canada)

Consolation

11 June 1995

Ozark	11–6	Rio Grande
Try: Roach; Pen: Corbett (2)		Pen: Taylor (2)

Lemont, IL
Referee: J. Turner

Final

11 June 1995

Michigan	22–10	Ohio
Try: Aaron Yaverski c Karries 60'; Baker; Con: Neal Whitfield; Pen: Neal Whitfield		Try: Kuzma 44' c Con: Lutterbach; Pen: Lutterbach

Lemont, IL
Referee: Pearce Higgins (Canada)

== High School ==
The 1995 National High School Rugby Championship was a twelve team tournament that took place from 19 to 20 May at the Fort Snelling polo grounds in Minneapolis, MN. The Highland squad from Utah won the championship by defeating Walt Whitman of Bethesda, MD in the final.

Pool A
Highland 34–0 Park Hill
Highland 18–3 Worthington
Worthington W–L Park Hill
Pool B
Doylestown 28–0 Redmond
Doylestown 10–5 Wellington
Redmond W–L Wellington
Pool C
Walt Whitman 24–0 East Metro
Walt Whitman 19–0 St. Louis Druids
St. Louis Druids W–L East Metro
Pool D
Fort Collins 13–14 Xavier
Fort Collins 17–5 Kentwood
Kentwood W–L Xavier

Consolation semifinals
Wellington W–L Park Hill
Xavier W–L East Metro
Kentwood W–L St. Louis Druids
Worthington W–L Redmond

Eleventh place
Park Hill 7–5 East Metro

Ninth place
Xavier 13–12 Wellington

Seventh place
Redmond 5–5 St. Louis Druids

Fifth place
Worthington 23–22 Kentwood

Semifinals

20 May 1995

Highland	19–8	Doylestown
Try: Matt Anderson; Scott Giles; Pen: Chris Whitney 5', 10', 1H'		Try: Brian Tyler 47'; Pen: 1H'

Minneapolis, MN

20 May 1995

Walt Whitman	12–5	Fort Collins
Try: Dwight Uptgrow

Minneapolis, MN

Third place

20 May 1995

Doylestown	15–7	Fort Collins

Minneapolis, MN

=== Final ===
20 May 1995

Highland	10–8	Walt Whitman
Try: Scott Giles 50' c Con: Chris Whitney; Pen: Chris Whitney 15'		Try: Na'im Greene 75'; Pen: Andrew Pearson 22'

Minneapolis, MN

Lineups:
Highland– Larry Gelwix (Coach), Wilson, Hadfield, Maughn, Westinskow, Whitney, Anderson, Kotter, McNeil, Huish, Flandro, Richards, Dours, McCullough, Griff (Giles), Fountaine.
Walt Whitman– Dan Soso (Coach), Uptgrow, Dilla, Cardona, Gross, Hernandez, Stevenson, Patrickson, Bogart, Mates, Pearson, Moore, Olivas, Cooper, Greene, Browne.

Final standings:
First: Highland High School RFC, Salt Lake City, Utah (4–0)
Second: Walt Whitman High School RFC, Maryland (3–1)
Third: Doylestown Junior RFC, Doylestown, Pennsylvania (3–1)
Fourth: Fort Collins Youth RFC, Fort Collins, Colorado (1–3)
Fifth: Worthington RFC, Columbus, Ohio (3–1)
Sixth: Kentwood High School RFC, Seattle, Washington (2–2)
Seventh tie: Redmond RFC, Washington (1–2–1)
Seventh tie: St. Louis Druids RFC, St. Louis, Missouri (1–2–1)
Ninth: Xavier High School RFC, New York City, New York (3–1)
Tenth: Wellington High School RFC, Indianapolis, Indiana (1–3)
Eleventh: Park Hill RFC, Missouri (1–3)
Twelfth: East Metro RFC, Minneapolis/St Paul, Minnesota (0–4)
