= The Knuckleduster Firearms Shop =

The Knuckleduster Firearms Shop is a 2000 role-playing game supplement published by Knuckleduster Publications.

== Contents ==
The Knuckleduster Firearms Shop is a supplement in which weapons from the second half of the 19th century are detailed.

== Reviews ==
- Pyramid
- Black Gate
- Games Unplugged #7 (April, 2001)
