= The Island of Doctor Apocalypse =

Tabletop role-playing game adventure

The Island of Doctor Apocalypse is an adventure published by Fantasy Games Unlimited (FGU) in 1982 for the superhero role-playing game Villains and Vigilantes.

== Plot summary ==
The Island of Doctor Apocalypse begins immediately where the preceding adventure, Death Duel with the Destroyers, ended: The superheroes (player characters) have just defeated the Destroyers, but they have less than a day to find Dr. Apocalypse before he destroys multiple cities in the United States.

== Publication history ==
FGU published the first superhero role-playing game, Villains & Vigilantes, in 1979. They published their first adventure for the game in 1981, and followed that in 1982 with Death Duel with the Destroyers. The sequel to that adventure, also published in 1982, was The Island of Doctor Apocalypse, a 22-page saddle-stapled softcover book written and illustrated by Bill Willingham.

== Reception ==
William A. Barton reviewed The Island of Dr. Apocalypse in The Space Gamer No. 59. Barton commented that "Overall, Island of Dr. Apocalypse is a satisfying follow-up adventure to Death Duel and should help gain new adherents to V&V – possibly even regain some who may have defected to some of the newer second-generation superhero RPGs. And if not, with a few revisions Island would make a great adventure for Champions or Superworld too."

In the November–December 1984 edition of Different Worlds (Issue #37), Paul Ryan O'Connor found much to like in this adventure's clean layout, but thought that the module lacked the humorous tone of previous Villains & Vigilantes releases. He also found that far too much detail about the island had been included in the slim 21-page book. "What all this does is monopolize the page count and crush the character descriptions into the last few pages of the book." He concluded by giving the adventure an average rating of 2.5 out of 4, saying, "If you are looking for a free-wheeling adventure in the mold of previous FGU V&V efforts, then pass this one by."
