= Death Duel with the Destroyers =

Death Duel with the Destroyers is an adventure published by Fantasy Games Unlimited (FGU) in 1982 for the superhero role-playing game Villains and Vigilantes.

== Plot summary ==
The second adventure published by FGU for Villains & Vigilantes, this scenario depicts the first of several battles between a team of player character superheroes and the supervillain scientist Dr. Apocalypse. A series of monster storms strikes the Eastern United States while a holographic figure of Dr. Apocalypse appears in the skies and mocks the people. The superheroes (player characters) are then alerted to a giant robot attacking Times Square, before they take on the group of supervillains known as The Destroyers.

== Publication history ==
FGU published the first superhero role-playing game, Villains & Vigilantes, in 1979. They published their first adventure for the game in 1981, and followed that in 1982 with Death Duel with the Destroyers, a 21-page saddle-stapled softcover book written and illustrated by Bill Willingham.

This was quickly followed by a sequel, The Island of Doctor Apocalypse (1982).

== Reception ==
William A. Barton reviewed Death Duel with the Destroyers in The Space Gamer No. 52. Barton commented that "Death Duel with the Destroyers could provide a good evening or two of superheroic action. If you haven't yet given up on V&V, wish to wait for the revised rules, or feel up to adapting it to another system, it could prove worth your investment."

In the August 1982 edition of Different Worlds (Issue 23), Steve Perrin liked the adventure, although he admitted it was very similar to many "overdone comic book plots." Perrin thought the design of the supervillain lair was well executed, and he also enjoyed the panels of comic book art. He concluded with a good recommendation, saying, "All in all this is a very good scenario for V&V players."
