= Jack Herman =

American game designer

- Occupation: Game designer
- Years active: 1979-present

Jack Herman is an American game designer who has worked primarily on role-playing games.

== Career ==
In the late 1970s, Jack Herman and Jeff Dee co-created Villains and Vigilantes, the first complete superhero role-playing game. The game was published by Fantasy Games Unlimited in 1979. Dee and Herman convinced Scott Bizar to produce a second edition, which was published in 1982.

When Bizar began publishing a number of original PDFs for Villains and Vigilantes for free through his website in 2010, Dee and Herman contended that their contract was with FGU Inc., and not with Bizar, so that Bizar did not have the rights to publish V&V without FGU. Dee and Herman sent a cease-and-desist letter to Bizar in June 2010 to inform him that he was not permitted to sell their games. Bizar was offered a license for the right to continue publishing material for Villains & Vigilantes but he had refused this license as of early 2011, and Bizar also refused to enter into arbitration with Dee and Herman, although they have stated that their contract requires arbitration.

Dee and Herman published Villains & Vigilantes version 2.1 in 2010 using their new brand Monkey House Games, which they founded to recover the rights to Villains and Vigilantes, and the company is a partner of Cubicle 7.
