= Troy Christensen =

American author and game designer

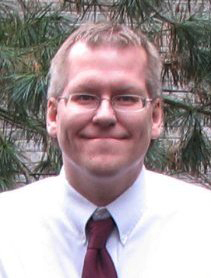
- Born: Grand Rapids, Michigan
- Occupations: Writer; game designer; IT support
- Writing career
- Period: 1984–present
- Genres: Speculative fiction, fantasy, science-fiction
- Notable works: Amish Johnson and the Pegasus Chamber, Phantasm Adventures
- Website: emeraldtablet.wordpress.com

Troy Christensen (born July 16, 1964) is an American author and game designer. Based in Grand Rapids, Michigan, he is an established figure in the role-playing game community.

== Biography ==
Troy Christensen created the Phantasm Adventures game, and the first edition was published in 1982. In 1987 he rewrote the game as Phantasm Adventures II. Advanced Phantasm Adventures was released in 1988, and was described by Dragon as a rich and complicated fantasy role-playing game system. The rules was first printed as an independent publication, just as Dungeons & Dragons was reaching the height in American popularity in the late 1980s. In 1987, he moved to Japan and went to school there. He attended the International Christian University in Mitaka Japan, with the aspiration of learning Japanese for cartoon translation. Although Troy Christensen was living in Japan and going to a Japanese university, he could not speak the language. The cultural shock put great pressure on his ability to maintain grades. He found his escape when he sought out Japanese gamers. There he made contact with Dai Nippon Kaiga (大日本絵画), a company willing to publish his new game ideas. Working through their Artbox brand division, he released numerous books and manuals that exemplified Japanese language radical role-playing games. With the release of Advanced Phantasm Adventures and Multiverse, he introduced a number of new concepts to the role-playing game genre. He is known among other things for his series of Japanese language role-playing games.

Notably the Phantasm Adventure rules allowed for a large scope of playable races, unseen before this game, numbering more than fifty. With a combination of racial and personal statistics, ranging from a score of 1 to 10, each player character could be given a comparative score that classified the individual among all other NPCs and player characters in the game. Thus the game made it possible for a pixie barbarian as well as an ogre necromancer. By multiplying their racial and personal scores, they could be played in the same campaign with varying and startling mix of possibilities. It was a new game concept to divorce race and class restrictions on a character design and it was unheard of at the time to have more than a dozen playable races to pick. The rules also created a whole new methodology of creating spellcasters. Instead of simply selecting spells from a list, in Phantasm Adventures each wizard is unique in the way they harnessed, memorized, and cast each spell. The rules alluded that no two spell casters would ever be the same.

As early as 1984 Troy Christensen was writing books for Villains & Vigilantes. He would eventually write three modules: Devil's Domain, Most Wanted III, and Dawn of the Devil. All three books expanded upon the universe of Villains & Vigilantes, with the Devil's Domain being reviewed in the Space Gamer magazine.

By the mid-1990s he had worked for a number of prestigious game publishers. He reached the height of his game writing with AD&D second edition Thief's Challenge, The Castle Guide, Arms and Equipment Guide, and RoleMaster Heroes and Rogues. In 1992 he released two short role-playing books called Bloodbath and Bloodchant. Both of the books described gruesome and sometimes powerful visuals of decapitation and mutilation. A review warned parents away from the gratuitous violence of the game rules. Distinctively ahead of his time, Troy Christensen produced a wide range of games and sold them not just in the United States, but also in Japan. Making that leap across geographic and cultural boundaries, he found an audience for many new game designs.

Christensen continues to write paper and pencil role-playing games. In recent years he has released a new version of Phantasm Adventures on numerous digital storefronts. In the new edition, the game has been published in five books, two of which are presently available. The other books have yet been released but are projected to be published in 2015.

== Novels ==
Amish Johnson and the Pegasus Chamber, the first book of the Amish Johnson Trilogy, was published in July 2014. With special arrangement, in October 2014 Amazon published Christensen's next novella called The Tome.

=== Rules and novels ===
Name	Year	ISBN	Notes	Publisher	Language
Devil's Domain	1984	ISBN ~	Paperback	FGU	English
Most Wanted III	1985	ISBN ~	Paperback	FGU	English
Dawn of the Devils	1986	ISBN ~	Paperback	FGU	English
Phantasm Adventures	1987	ISBN 978-4-499-20523-8	Paperback	DaiNippon Kaiga	Japanese
Phantasm Adventures GM Screen	1988	ISBN 978-4-499-20521-4	Paperback	DaiNippon Kaiga	Japanese
Black Keep of Serpent's Lake	1988	ISBN ~	Paperback	DaiNippon Kaiga	Japanese
Bloodbath	1988	ISBN ~	Paperback	TC International	English
Bloodchant	1989	ISBN ~	Paperback	TC International	English
Misty Island Campaign	1989	ISBN 978-4-499-20542-9	Paperback	DaiNippon Kaiga	Japanese
Phantasm Adventures World Guide	1989	ISBN ~	Paperback	DaiNippon Kaiga	Japanese
Advanced Phantasm Adventures	1990	ISBN 4-499-20556-5	Paperback	DaiNippon Kaiga	Japanese
Heroes and Rouges	1990	ISBN 1-55806-141-X	Paperback	ICE	English
The Castle Guide	1990	ISBN 978-0-88038-837-5	Paperback	TSR	English
Arms And Equipment Guide	1991	ISBN 1-56076-109-1	Paperback	TSR	English
Multiverse	1991	ISBN 4-499-20577-8	Paperback	DaiNippon Kaiga	English
Thief's Challenge	1993	ISBN 1-56076-562-3	Paperback	TSR	English
Amish Johnson and the Pegasus Chamber	2014	ISBN 1-311-46674-6	Digital	TC International	English
Phantasm Adventures IV: Character Guide	2014	ISBN 1-310-41398-3	Digital	TC International	English
Phantasm Adventures IV: GameMaster Guide	2014	ISBN 1-311-52985-3	Digital	TC International	English
The Tome	2014	ISBN [ASIN] B00OX15778	Digital	TC International	English
