= Ken Cliffe =

American game designer

- Occupation: Game designer

Ken Cliffe is a game designer who has worked primarily on role-playing games. He is known primarily as the author and developer for the third edition of Ars Magica, and as co-author and developer of the Trinity, Hunter: The Reckoning and "new" (2004) World of Darkness role-playing games.

== Career ==
=== Villains and Vigilantes ===
Ken Cliffe began his career writing supplements in support of Fantasy Games Unlimited's role-playing game, Villains and Vigilantes, including Vigilantes International, which was published much later as part of a revival of the line. He was credited with developing the supplements he authored into a coherent universe for the game.

=== White Wolf Publishing ===
Cliffe later came to White Wolf Publishing, contributing to the second book it published: The Campaign Book Volume One: Fantasy (1990). Cliffe was the line editor on Ars Magica for the majority of the time the game was in publication at White Wolf, and developed and authored the third edition of Ars Magica (1992). With Robert Hatch, Cliffe launched Mind's Eye Theatre in 1993, the live action role-playing game based on Mark Rein•Hagen's Vampire: The Masquerade tabletop role-playing game.

In 1992, Cliffe became editor of White Wolf magazine, and was apparently supervising all of the legacy products published by White Wolf, in the years when it was releasing the early World of Darkness games. Cliffe made White Wolf magazine a monthly publication beginning with issue #39 (January 1994); at this time he regularly contributed reviews of games by other publishers to the magazine. Subsequently, Cliffe was one of the authors on the Creature Collection (2000), a book of monsters and the first release from White Wolf's Sword & Sorcery imprint.

=== World of Darkness games ===
In collaboration with Bill Bridges, Cliffe developed and launched new game lines for White Wolf: Trinity (1997) and Hunter: The Reckoning (1999). Again he collaborated with Bridges to develop the reboot of White Wolf's game lines in the early 2000s. He developed and authored The World of Darkness core book (2004), which combined the new World of Darkness setting and rule system into one book. With Justin Achilli, he also co-authored Vampire: The Requiem for Dummies, which concentrates on the Chronicles of Darkness setting and character creation rules for the Storytelling system.

In 2008 and 2009, White Wolf released the board games Hunter: Deadly Prey and Monster Mayem, also designed by Cliffe.
