= Patrick Zircher =

American comic book writer and artist

- Areas: Penciller, Inker
- Notable works: Iron Man; Thunderbolts; New Warriors

Patrick Zircher (/ˈzɜːrtʃər/) is an American comic book artist and penciller.

== Career ==
Zircher's early career as an illustrator began with production of several completed works for Villains and Vigilantes, Champions and other pen-and-paper role-playing games, as well as work for independent comic book publishers. He illustrated a number of projects for Caliber Comics including Dragon Star II, Jason and the Argonauts (under the Tome Press banner), and his own creator owned series, Samurai 7 (released under Caliber's Gauntlet imprint).

Following this he went on to work largely for Marvel Comics on titles including Iron Man, Thunderbolts and New Warriors. He also did a considerable amount of work for DC, primarily on Nightwing and on Shadowman for Valiant Comics.

== Bibliography ==
Zircher's cover for Marvel Comics' Cable & Deadpool #12 (April 2005)

=== DC Comics ===
- Action Comics #957–958, 963–964, 969–970, 973–974, 979–980, 984 (2016–2017)
- Birds of Prey #13 (along with Greg Land) (2000)
- Darkstars #8-9 (1993)
- Detective Comics #784-786 (2003)
- The Flash vol. 4 #23.1, 27-28 (2013-2014)
- Green Arrow vol. 4 # 41–46, 48 (2015)
- Hal Jordan and the Green Lantern Corps #30-31 (2017)
- Justice League Quarterly #10 (1993)
- Nightwing vol. 2 #42-44, 47, 77, 86–91, 93 (2002–04)
- Nightwing vol. 4 #53 (2018)
- The Silencer #8-10 (2018)
- Suicide Squad vol. 3 #20-22, 24-26 (2013-2014)
- Superman #584 (2000)
- Titans #13 (2000)
- Trinity vol. 2 #17-18, 21-22 (2017-2018)
- Young Justice #22 (2000)
- The New 52: Futures End #1, 6, 9, 13, 17, 22, 25, 29, 34, 40, 44 (2014)

=== Marvel Comics ===
- Avengers, vol 3, #55 (2002)
- Black Panther, vol. 2, #59-60 (2003)
- Cable & Deadpool #3-24, 50 (2004–06)
- Captain America, vol. 3, #23 (1999)
- Captain Marvel, vol. 2, #14, 35 (2001–02)
- Civil War: The Initiative (Iron Man) (2007)
- Dr. Strange, Sorcerer Supreme #83 (1995)
- Hulk, vol. 3, #36, 42-46 (2011)
- Iron Man, vol 3, #6, 12, 16, 20 (1998–99)
- Iron Man, vol. 4, #7-14 (2006–07)
- Iron Man/Captain America '98, one shot (1998)
- Iron Man: The Iron Age, miniseries, #1-2 (1998)
- Ms. Marvel, vol. 2, #12 (along with Roberto de la Torre) (2007)
- Mystery Men, 5-issue limited series with David Liss (August–November 2011, tpb: hardcover ISBN 978-0785162933, soft cover ISBN 978-0785147459)
- New Warriors #55-75 (1995–96)
- Secret Avengers #21.1 (2012)
- Star Trek: Early Voyages #1-8, 13-15 (1997–98)
- Star Trek: Telepathy War (1997)
- Terror Inc., miniseries, #1-5 (2007–08)
- Thor: Ages of Thunder (along with Khari Evans) (2008)
- Thor: Man of War (along with Clay Mann) (2009)
- Thor: Reign of Blood (along with Khari Evans) (2008)
- Thunderbolts #45, 49, 51–58, 60–65, 67 (2000–02)
- Venom: Along Came a Spider, miniseries, #1-3 (1996)
- Web of Spider-Man Super-Special (Black Cat) #1 (1995)
- X-Men 2: The Movie (2003)

=== Other publishers ===
- Green Hornet #16-17, 19, 22–24, 26–28, 31, 34-37 (NOW Comics, 1992–94)
- Vampirella Monthly #13-14 (Harris, 1999)
- Shadowman #1-6 (2012-2013)

Preceded by Richard Pace	New Warriors artist 1994–1996	Succeeded by Steve Scott
Preceded by Sean Chen	Iron Man artist 1998	Succeeded by Sean Chen
Preceded by Louis Small	Vampirella artist 1999	Succeeded by Dorian Cleavenger
Preceded by Mark Bagley	Thunderbolts (comics) artist 2001–2002	Succeeded by Patrick Zircher & Chris Batista
Preceded by Patrick Zircher	Thunderbolts (comics) artist 2002–2002 (with Chris Batista)	Succeeded by Manuel Garcia
Preceded by Shawn Martinbrough	Detective Comics artist 2003	Succeeded by Rick Burchett
Preceded by Rick Leonardi	Nightwing artist 2004	Succeeded by Mike Lilly
Preceded by Mark Brooks	Cable & Deadpool artist 2004–2006	Succeeded by Lan Medina
Preceded by Adi Granov	Iron Man artist 2006–2006	Succeeded by Roberto de la Torre
