= Adventurers Club (magazine) =

Magazine published 1983–1995

- Issue 1
- Editor: Steve Peterson; Bill Robinson; Bruce Harlick
- Categories: Role-playing games
- Frequency: Quarterly
- First issue: Fall 1983
- Final issue Number: Fall 1995; 27
- Company: Hero Games
- Country: United States
- Language: English
- ISSN: 0896-8764

Adventurers Club was a quarterly magazine published by Hero Games and edited at various times by Steve Peterson, Bill Robinson and Bruce Harlick. It was started in 1983 and ceased publication in 1995. In total 27 issues were published.

== Contents ==
Adventurers Club originally featured supplementary material for Champions and Espionage, in addition to news from Hero Games and a letter column purportedly edited by the fictional villain Foxbat.

== History ==
In 1983, Hero Games started up its Adventurers Club house magazine. However, by 1986, the company was having financial and staffing problems, and as a result Adventurers Club #7 (Summer 1986), which had been ready to print in March 1985, was delayed for more than a year as money was diverted to other projects.

As the result of a merger in 1988 between Hero Games and Iron Crown Enterprises (ICE), five issues of the magazine (#8 to #12) featured articles about both Hero and ICE games. In the 2014 book Designers & Dragons, game historian Shannon Appelcline wrote, "Unfortunately, fans hated the split magazine. In their final dual-branded issue, editor Aaron Allston acknowledged that half of the readers had been asking that the ICE articles be removed and the other half had been asking that only ICE articles be covered."

In response, Adventurers Club was once again dedicated solely to Hero games, while ICE published a tabloid magazine, Iron Crown Quarterly, which focused only on ICE games such as Rolemaster, Spacemaster, and Middle-earth Role Playing; ICE produced seven issues of Iron Crown Quartertly from 1988 to 1990.

== Reception ==
Allen Varney reviewed the magazine twice in the pages of Dragon:

- In the October 1990 edition (Issue 162), Varney derided Adventurers Club's claim of being a quarterly publication, pointing out that it had "appeared more or less annually for years." Varney commented that although it "deserves attention for its scenarios, NPCs, gadgets and campaigning tips", it was "thin and badly printed. At $3 an issue, it's still in a wait-and-see stage."
- In the September 1993 edition (Issue 197), Varney again noted that the magazine had rarely appeared on time in its first decade of publication. Varney thought that even in the latest issues, "Style and grammar still fall short of professional standards, and four bucks an issue seems a steep price on that count, if nothing else." He also noted that each individual issue might have little material for a gamemaster because "its coverage of all the different Hero System game genres means that any one issue may offer little for your own campaign."

In the Nov-Dec 1983 edition of Space Gamer (Issue No. 66), Russell Grant Collins thought that the magazine featured material essential for players of Champions, saying, "If you GM a Champions campaign, I really recommend this magazine. If you GM Espionage!, then it still might appeal to you. It is a worthy addition to the Hero line."

In Issue 30 of Abyss (Summer 1984), Dave Nalle called it "a good, if a bit limiting magazine for Champions players, but even for players of other superhero games it is rather one sided." Nalle was annoyed by "the editors/publishers thumping their drum so much in the articles and ad/information pages. It makes all sound a little insincere." Nalle concluded, "For Champions and maybe Espionage! players I'd say go for it, but it really isn't for anyone else, however well done it may be."

== Reviews ==
- Comics Feature #37
