= Jeff Dee =

American artist and game designer

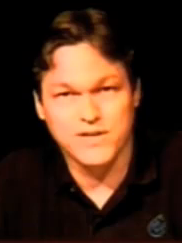
- Dee on The Atheist Experience television series, January 4, 2009
- Born: United States
- Known for: Fantasy art, illustration

Jeff Dee is an American artist and game designer. He was the youngest artist in the history of pioneering role-playing game company TSR when he began his work at the age of 18. He also designed the Villains and Vigilantes superhero game. He was a co-host on The Atheist Experience and Non-Prophets atheism advocacy podcasts.

== Biography ==
In the late 1970s, while Dee was still a teenager, he and Jack Herman created Villains and Vigilantes, the first complete superhero role-playing game. The game was published by Fantasy Games Unlimited in 1979. Dee and Herman persuaded Scott Bizar to produce a second edition of Villains and Vigilantes, which was published in 1982. Dee came up with the idea of creating a role-playing game based on cartoons when he, Greg Costikyan, and other designers were discussing which genres had no role-playing game systems yet; although they agreed that it would be impossible for such a game to be designed, a few years later Costikyan designed Toon as a full game with the assistance of Warren Spector.

Dee was the youngest artist in TSR history when he began working for them at the age of 18. Dee designed a new superhero role-playing game originally titled Advanced Villains and Vigilantes, which was ultimately published as Living Legends in 2005. In 2009, he co-founded Nemesis Games, developers of an MMO named Gargantua.

Dee has long been an advocate for the role-playing game industry.

== Advocacy of atheism ==
In addition to his artistic and game-related work, Dee is an outspoken atheist and transhumanist. He has been the host of a bi-weekly Internet podcast called The Non-Prophets and a former host of a live, weekly, public-access television program, The Atheist Experience.
