= Comics Feature =

American magazine

- Cover of Comics Feature #1 (Mar. 1980)
- Editors: Carol Kalish (1980–1982); Dean Mullaney (1980); Richard Howell (1982); Robert Lewis (c. 1983–1986); Hal Schuster (1986–1987)
- Categories: comics, animation, criticism, history, interviews
- Frequency: (1980, 1986–1987) Monthly (1981–1982, 1984–1985) Bimonthly (1983) Quarterly
- Publisher: New Media Publishing
- First issue: March 1980; 46 years ago
- Final issue Number: July 1987; 39 years ago 57
- Country: United States
- Based in: Clearwater, Florida (1980–1981); Rockville, Maryland (1981–c. 1985); Los Angeles, California (c. 1985–1987)
- Language: English

Comics Feature was an American magazine of news, criticism, and commentary pertaining to comic books, comic strips, and animation. Published by New Media Publishing, it produced 57 issues (and a number of specials) between 1980 and 1987.

Staff members and regular contributors to Comics Feature included Kurt Busiek, Max Allan Collins, Ron Goulart, Will Jacobs and Gerard Jones, Scott McCloud, Steve Perrin, Peter Sanderson, Roy Thomas, Don & Maggie Thompson, and James Van Hise. Guest contributors included Stan Lee, who wrote a column on writing for comics for parts of two years.

== History ==
After dabbling in publishing for a few years, brothers Hal and Jack Schuster, co-owners of the distributor New Media/Irjax, founded New Media Publishing (NMP) in 1980. NMP's first publication, launched in March 1980, was the professionally produced hobbyist fanzine Comics Feature.

NMP's line of publications was overseen by editorial director Peter B. Gillis; Comics Feature's first editors were Dean Mullaney and Carol Kalish. Mullaney soon left the editor job to focus full-time on his publishing house, Eclipse Enterprises. Peter B. Gillis left NMP in June 1981, with Richard Howell replacing him as editorial director. Howell joined his partner Carol Kalish as co-editor of Comics Feature in late 1981. Howell and Kalish didn't last long, however, as they both left for positions at Marvel Comics by the conclusion of 1982. Despite the turmoil, Comics Feature was nominated for Favourite Fan Publication in the 1981 Eagle Awards, losing to The Comics Journal in a close vote.

After Kalish and Howell's departure, the editorial reins of Comics Feature passed to Robert Lewis. NMP Published Hal Schuster became editor in 1986, staying in that position through the magazine's final issue.

In the summer of 1987, Marvel Comics sued the Schuster brothers for copyright and trademark infringement, claiming they had improperly used Marvel artwork in various issues of another NMP magazine. The Marvel lawsuit appears to have put the various Schuster Brother operations out of business, as they stopped publishing after that point; Comics Feature was one of the casualties.

=== Publishing details ===
Comics Feature started out as a monthly, with some exceptions where the magazine skipped a month. In 1981 and 1982 it was published roughly on a bimonthly basis. 1983 only saw three issues of Comics Feature published, but the magazine returned to a bimonthly schedule in 1984 and 1985. Comics Feature returned to a monthly schedule in 1986 and 1987.

In total, Comics Feature published 57 issues from March 1980 to July 1987.

In addition, NMP published the following Comics Feature specials:

- Comics Feature: The Fandom Zone (1 issue, 1980) — edited by Don and Maggie Thompson
- Comics Feature Summer Special (1 issue, 1983)
- Comics Feature Interviews (1 issue, 1984)
- Comics Feature Collectors Edition (2 issues, 1984)

== Content ==
The magazine's regular content included industry news, comics creator interviews, histories of Silver Age characters and comic book companies, and reviews of current titles. Regular columns included Don & Maggie Thompson's The Fandom Zone (1980–1982), Looking Back at the Golden Age (written by Roy Thomas in 1986–1987), Saturday Morning Season (about animated television shows), and How to Write Comics, a column by Stan Lee that ran in 1985–1986.

There were also regular stories on the animation business, role-playing games, and comics collecting/investing (written by Mike Benton). Ron Goulart wrote about science fiction comic strips. Comics Feature primarily focused on the two major mainstream publishing companies of the time, Marvel Comics and DC Comics, with more covers devoted to Marvel properties. (The magazine was also not above reporting on other NMP publications.)

Each issue featured at least one major interview, often with some of the industry's most popular creators. Noteworthy interviews included Julius Schwartz in issue #30; Stan Lee in issues #33, #44, and #50; Jack Kirby in issues #34, #44, and #50; Jim Steranko in issue #50; the Adventures of Superman TV series cast in issue #57; and Bugs Bunny in issue #45!

The magazine didn't restrict itself exclusively to mainstream American comics: other notable interviews included Hunt Emerson and Gilbert Shelton in issue #3, Art Spiegelman and Françoise Mouly in issue #4, Bill Griffith in issue #7, Larry Gonick in issue #12/13, and Ralph Bakshi in issue #39.

Issue #10, published in 1981, focused on Captain America's 40th anniversary. Issue #18, in 1982, commemorated the 50th anniversary of Dick Tracy, as well as a review of the past year in the comics industry. Issue #22, also published in 1982, commemorated Spider-Man's 20th anniversary. Issue #26 was devoted to a Russ Manning tribute. Issue #32, published in 1984, celebrated DC Comics' 50th anniversary, and featured an interview with Vice-President/Executive Editor Dick Giordano on the future of the company. Issue #44 (May 1986) was devoted to Marvel Comics' 25th anniversary. The magazine's 50th issue featured interviews with Jack Kirby, Stan Lee, Jim Steranko, Michael Kaluta, Chris Claremont, Brent Anderson, Charles Vess, and Jim Shooter.

=== Features and columns ===
- Animation
- The Artistic Life
- End Notes — profile at the back of each issue
- The Fandom Zone by Don & Maggie Thompson
- Guilty Fantasies
- How to Write Comics by Stan Lee (1985–1986)
- Looking Back at the Golden Age — written by Roy Thomas in 1986–1987
- Saturday Morning Season (Animated Chatter)
- Strip Search — comic strips

== Editors ==
- 1980: Dean Mullaney and Carol Kalish
- 1981: Carol Kalish
- Dec. 1981–1982: Richard Howell and Carol Kalish
- 1983–Feb. 1986: Robert Lewis
- Mar. 1986–July 1987: Hal Schuster

== Interview subjects (selected) ==
- Adventures of Superman TV series cast (#57, Jul. 1987)
- Kirk Alyn (#55, May 1987)
- Brent Anderson (#20, Oct. 1982 #50, Dec. 1986)
- Murphy Anderson (#10, July 1981; #12/13, Sept./Oct. 1981)
- Ralph Bakshi (#39, Dec. 1985)
- Joseph Barbera (#47, Aug. 1986)
- Cary Bates (#8, Jan. 1981)
- Stephen R. Bissette (#30, July 1984)
- E. Nelson Bridwell (#10, July 1981)
- John Buscema (#31, Sept. 1984)
- Bugs Bunny (#45, June 1986)
- John Byrne (#27, Feb. 1984; #49, Nov. 1986)
- Chris Claremont (#20, Oct. 1982; #28, Mar. 1984; #50, Dec. 1986)
- Max Allan Collins (#18, Aug. 1982; #30, July 1984)
- Tom DeFalco (#22, Dec. 1982)
- Mary Jo Duffy (#16, Feb. 1982)
- Steve Englehart (#5, Sept. 1980)
- Hunt Emerson (#3, June 1980)
- Steve Gerber (#12/13, Sept./Oct. 1981)
- Walter B. Gibson (#43, Apr. 1986)
- Dick Giordano (#32, Nov. 1984)
- Larry Gonick (#12/13, Sept./Oct. 1981)
- Ron Goulart (#30, July 1984)
- Mike Grell (#2, May 1980)
- Bill Griffith (#7, Nov. 1980)
- Don Heck (#21, Nov. 1982)
- Chuck Jones (interviewed by Ray Bradbury) (#42, Mar. 1986)
- Michael Kaluta (#50, Dec. 1986)
- Jack Kirby (#34, Mar. 1985; #44, May 1986; #50, Dec. 1986)
- Bob Layton (#2, May 1980)
- Stan Lee (#33, Jan. 1985; #44, May 1986 #50, Dec. 1986)
- Paul Levitz (#15, Jan. 1982)
- Russ Manning (#26, Dec. 1983)
- Bill Mantlo (#17, June 1982)
- Marvel Comics editorial staff (#23/24, early 1983)
- Frank Miller (#14, Dec. 1981; #25, mid-1983; #43, Apr. 1986; #49, Nov. 1986)
- David Michelinie (#2, May 1980)
- Denny O'Neil (#4, July/Aug. 1980)
- George Pérez (#19, Sept. 1982)
- John Romita Jr. (#22, Dec. 1982)
- John Romita Sr. (#22, Dec. 1982)
- Mike Royer (#26, Dec. 1983)
- Julius Schwartz (#30, July 1984)
- Gilbert Shelton (#3, June 1980)
- Jim Shooter (#44, May 1986; #50, Dec. 1986)
- Walt and Louise Simonson (#38, Nov. 1985)
- Art Spiegelman and Françoise Mouly (#4, July/Aug. 1980)
- Leonard Starr (#9, Feb. 1981)
- Jim Steranko (#50, Dec. 1986)
- Dave Stevens (#26, Dec. 1983)
- Joe Staton (#25, mid-1983)
- William Stout (#26, Dec. 1983)
- Upstart Studios: Walt Simonson, Frank Miller, James Sherman, Howard Chaykin (#10, July 1981)
- Boris Vallejo (#3, June 1980)
- Charles Vess (#50, Dec. 1986)
- Len Wein (#6, Oct. 1980)
- Doug Wildey (#30, July 1984; #31, Sept. 1984)
- Marv Wolfman (#12/13, Sept./Oct. 1981; #28, Mar. 1984; #52, Feb. 1987)

== See also ==
- Amazing Heroes
- The Comic Reader
