= Villains and Vigilantes =

Tabletop superhero role-playing game

- Revised edition cover
- Designers: Jeff Dee, Jack Herman
- Publishers: Fantasy Games Unlimited; Monkey House Games
- Publication: 1979 (1st Edition); 1982 (Revised Edition); 2010 (2.1 Edition); 2017 (3rd Edition)
- Genres: Superhero
- Systems: Custom

Villains and Vigilantes (abbreviated as V&V) is a superhero-themed role-playing game published by Fantasy Games Unlimited (FGU) in 1979 that competed primarily with rival superhero RPGs Champions and Superworld in the early to mid-1980s.

== Origin ==
Villains and Vigilantes was the first role-playing game designed by Jack Herman and Jeff Dee and featured illustrations by Dee. Fantasy Games Unlimited published the first edition of Villains and Vigilantes in 1979. The second edition of Villains and Vigilantes was published in 1982 with significant rule revisions. In 2010, Monkey House Games published a new edition of the game, although a lawsuit filed in U.S. Federal court, Arizona District, (Case no. 2:2011-cv-02036) asserted that Monkey House Games had no legal right to do so. That lawsuit has since been resolved and a settlement agreed upon with both parties producing their own material.

== Mechanics ==
Character creation in Villains and Vigilantes reflects the unique nature of the rules. Instead of playing a completely fictional character, players are encouraged to start the process with a version of themselves (presumably as the superhero's "secret identity.") V&V then uses random die rolls for the origins of superpowers (i.e., mutant, space alien, etc.) number and type, sometimes resulting in odd combinations. A further quirk of the system is that while players advance in levels and hit points, superpowers do not, lending a different feel to characters at low, middle, and high power levels. Character stats in the first edition of the game are strength, endurance, agility, intelligence, and charisma.

Another feature of the system is its approach to combat: a table outlines the effectiveness of the attacker's superpower (for example, an energy blast) against the defender's powers, reflecting the interplay of attack and defense powers.

== Publication history ==
The first edition was created by Jeff Dee and Jack Herman and published by Fantasy Games Unlimited in 1979. This book was followed by an adventure published in 1981, "Break In at Three Kilometer Island", and a pair of adventures in 1982 designed specifically to be playable with the original ruleset, but to begin to introduce players to the revised second edition which was published later the same year. These two adventures were authored by Bill Willingham, the creator of the Fables comic book series. Willingham's adventures also used characters that would later appear in his Comico comic book series, Elementals.

The second edition of Villains & Vigilantes, created by the same authors and also published by Fantasy Games Unlimited, was released in 1982 in two formats, both as a single rulebook and in a boxed set that contained the revised rulebook, GM's screen, dice and character sheets. These were followed by a line of adventure module and rule supplements published through the '80s until the final supplement published in 1987, "For the Greater Good".

In 2004, Fantasy Games Unlimited began republishing the original V&V rules and supplements as a series of electronic supplements via the DriveThruRPG online store, continuing to add supplements until nearly the entire back catalog is now available.

In 2010, the creators of the game released a new revised version, version 2.1, published through Monkey House Games. This has caused ongoing legal disputes. That same year, Fantasy Games Unlimited began releasing new supplements for 2nd Edition Villains and Vigilantes, for the first time since 1987, while Monkey House Games continued to release supplements of its own. Both companies continue to sell their products. On April 20, 2016 a resolution has been agreed upon.

== Adventures ==
Crisis at Crusader Citadel is an introductory adventure published in 1982 by Fantasy Games Unlimited and written and illustrated by Dee and Herman. The scenario begins with the players controlling neophyte superheroes, based on themselves, who are looking to apply for membership in the established super-hero team called the Crusaders. During the adventure, the player-heroes have to stop a crime wave being carried out by the Crusaders' opposite numbers, a villain team called the Crushers.

Four years after the adventure booklet was published, the setting of the first adventure was used as the basis of a Villains and Vigilantes comic book limited series by Dee and Herman, published by Eclipse Comics. Each issue included character sheets for new heroes and villains, and updated material for the existing ones for use in the game. (This device was also used in another comic book limited series published by Eclipse, based on the superhero role-playing game the Champions, during the same period.)

Two early adventures for the game by Bill Willingham, Death Duel with the Destroyers and The Island of Dr. Apocalypse, used characters that would later appear in his Comico comic book series Elementals. Similarly, a Villains and Vigilantes character, The Dark, later appeared in a series of comic books by the independent publisher Continüm Comics.

=== Current Adventure List for Villains and Vigilantes (Version 2) ===
- 2002 Crisis at Crusader's Citadel
- 2003 Death Duel with the Destroyers
- 2004 Island of Doctor Apocalypse
- 2005 F.O.R.C.E.
- 2006 Assassin
- 2007 Opponents Unlimited
- 2008 Most Wanted, Volume 1
- 2010 Dawn of DNA
- 2011 From the Deeps of Space
- 2012 Battle Above the Earth
- 2013 To Tackle the T.O.T.E.M.
- 2014 Devil's Domain
- 2015 Pentacle Plot
- 2016 Terror by Night
- 2017 Most Wanted, Volume 3
- 2018 Pre-Emptive Strike
- 2019 Organized Crimes
- 2020 Enter the Dragon's Claw: HONOR
- 2021 Search for the Sensei
- 2022 Alone into the Night
- 2023 Super-Crooks and Criminals
- 2024 The Secret in the Swamp
- 2025 The Great Iridium Con
- 2026a Final Fight with the Furies
- 2027 For the Greater Good
- 2028 Dawn of the Devil
- 2029 Vigilantes International

== Reception ==
In the inaugural edition of Ares Magazine (March 1980), Greg Costikyan commented "Villains & Vigilantes is an imaginative, enjoyable game. Its major problem is 'creeping D&Dism;' most of the game-systems are directly derived from D&D, and are out of place in a superhero rpg. Also, the short rules do not really provide enough background material and world-design advice for a full-scale role-playing game." Costikyan gave the game a rating of 6 out of 9. Costikyan also wrote a review for Fantastic Science Fiction, and noted, "One silly aspect to the game is that a character’s characteristics are assigned by the gamemaster, and are supposed to be the same as the player himself — which makes some sense, but I know few brawny, muscle-bound gamers and few pot-bellied, dope-smoking super heroes."

In Issue 29 of The Space Gamer, Marc Weidenbaum wrote, ""Villains and Vigilantes is a good, firm, introductory role-playing game with easy-to-learn rules. If you are a game master from another 'world' you can, with little difficulty, adapt these rules to fit almost any other role-playing game."

Cat Francis reviewed Villains and Vigilantes for Pegasus magazine and stated that "Villains and Vigilantes, produced by Fantasy Games Unlimited, is one of the better superhero roleplaying games on the market. The second edition of the game has cleared up a lot of the minor flaws and frustrations from the first edition. The combat system has been made significantly quicker and simpler."

William A. Barton reviewed the revised Villains and Vigilantes in The Space Gamer No. 62 and commented "if you're really into superhero adventure, I'd recommend giving revised Villains and Vigilantes a try. If you decide you still like Champions or Superworld better, well, you can always use V&V to help you decide what powers to purchase in another system when your superintelligence is on patrol near Arcturus IV."

Paul Ryan O'Connor reviewed Villains and Vigilantes for Different Worlds and stated that "In summation, V&V carries my highest recommendation. The new second edition is a vast improvement over the original game. V&V is entertaining to read, and a lot of fun to play. V&V belongs in every gamer's collection."

In the September 1984 issue of Analog Science Fiction, Dana Lombardy noted, "With this game, the rules lean heavily to the use of metal figures." Lombardy also pointed out, "There's a lot of adventure and supplemental modules available for V&V, but the game isn't compatible with other superhero games."

In Issue 33 of Abyss, Lew Bryson admitted "I find it tough to get excited about this game." Bryson did not like either the character generation system or the combat system. Bryson concluded, "There are some good thoughts, but they are held down by the framework."

In his 1990 book The Complete Guide to Role-Playing Games, game critic Rick Swan commented that since its original appearance more than a decade before, "V&V continues to hold its own, thanks to its tongue-in-cheek approach and some genuinely inspired concepts." Swan thought the character generation system was the most notable part of the game, but "The rest of the game, sadly, lacks the elegance of the character-creation rules." Swan concluded by giving the game a solid rating of 3 out of 4, saying, "For those with a little role-playing experience under their belts, Vigilantes & Villains is a terrific introduction to superhero games."

== 2011 legal dispute ==
The game's creators were involved in a legal dispute with Fantasy Games Unlimited since 2011. They claimed that Fantasy Games Unlimited, Inc. ceased to exist in 1991, and that their contract specified that in such an event the contracted publication rights would revert to them, and that therefore the current Fantasy Games Unlimited (which they claim is a separate legal entity, although with the same owner) had no right to sell V&V material. A court case filed in U.S. Federal court, Arizona district (REFERENCE: case no. 2:2011-cv-02036) supported the claim by Fantasy Games Unlimited that the owner properly followed procedure to continue with the obligations of the New York business entity in continued operations as the Arizona entity. The case also asserted that at the time of its dissolution in New York, FGU was current on all obligations with that state and in good standing which then devolved into the entity now operating simply as Fantasy Games Unlimited.

A judgment given on July 11, 2012, on the first two counts of case no. 2:2011-cv-02036 in U.S. Federal court, Arizona district ruled in favor of Scott Bizar resulting in Jeff Dee and Jack Herman being found guilty of defamation and unfair business practice and causing unspecified damages to the plaintiff. More judgments on other counts were still pending as of that date. The judgment ordered (not withstanding any other punitive measures to be determined for damages on all counts) the defendants within 30 days to post conspicuously in every place on the internet a retraction/corrective measure where their false statements have been posted.

In January 2013, the U.S. District Court of Arizona found that Jeff Dee and Jack Herman own all copyrights to Villains and Vigilantes, including the previously contracted to Fantasy Games Unlimited. Additionally the court found that Fantasy Games Unlimited had been using Dee's and Herman's (the game creators') copyrighted material without permission by selling merchandise like T-shirts, comic books, and video games. Finally, the court found that Fantasy Games Unlimited had legally abandoned its trademark rights to the title "Villains and Vigilantes" due to disuse.
