= Fantasy Games Unlimited =

Tabletop role-playing game publisher

- Founded: 1975; 51 years ago
- Founder: Scott Bizar
- Country of origin: United States
- Headquarters location: Jericho, New York
- Fiction genres: Games
- Official website: www.fantasygamesunlimited.net

Fantasy Games Unlimited (FGU) is a publishing house for tabletop and role-playing games. The company has no in-house design teams and relies on submitted material from outside talent.

== History ==
Fantasy Games Unlimited (FGU) was founded in the summer of 1975 in Jericho, New York by Scott Bizar, the company's first publications were the wargames Gladiators and Royal Armies of the Hyborean Age. Upon the appearance and popularity of Dungeons & Dragons from TSR, the company turned its attentions to role-playing games, seeking and producing systems from amateurs and freelancers, paying them 10% of the gross receipts. FGU also copyrighted their games in the name of the designer so that the designer would receive any additional royalties for licensed figurines and other uses. Rather than focusing on one line and supporting it with supplements, FGU produced a stream of new games. Because of the disparate authors, the rules systems were incompatible. FGU Incorporated published many role-playing games.

FGU won the All Time Best Ancient Medieval Rules for 1979 H.G. Wells Award at Origins 1980 for Chivalry & Sorcery.

In 1991, Fantasy Games Unlimited Inc. was dissolved as a New York corporation. Bizar continues to publish in Arizona as a sole proprietorship called Fantasy Games Unlimited.

A new FGU website appeared in July 2006 offering the company's back catalog. It said that new products would be "coming soon". New Aftermath! products appeared in 2008. By 2010, much of the company's back catalog was available. At that time, FGU sought submissions for new adventures for their existing titles, primarily Aftermath!, Space Opera, and Villains and Vigilantes.

== Publications ==
- Aftermath!
- Archworld (1977)
- Bireme & Galley (1978)
- Blue Light Manual
- Broadsword
- Bunnies & Burrows
- Bushido
- Castle Plans
- Chivalry & Sorcery (1st & 2nd editions)
- Citadel
- Daredevils
- Diadem
- Down Styphon!
- Fire, Hack & Run
- Flash Gordon & the Warriors of Mongo
- Flashing Blades
- Frederick the Great
- Freedom Fighters
- Galactic Conquest
- Gangster!
- Gladiators
- Land of the Rising Sun
- Lands of Adventure
- Legion
- Lords & Wizards
- Madame Guillotine
- Merc
- Mercenary
- Middle Sea
- Odysseus
- Oregon Trail
- Other Suns
- Pieces of Eight
- Privateers & Gentlemen
- Psi World
- Royal Armies of the Hyborean Age
- Skull and Crossbones: Roleplay on the Spanish Main
- Space Marines
- Space Opera
- Star Explorer
- Starship: The Game of Space Contact
- Starships & Spacemen (now owned by Goblinoid Games)
- Swordbearer
- The Blue-Light Manual
- Towers for Tyrants
- Treasure of the Lost Temple
- Tyrannosaurus wrecks
- Villains and Vigilantes
- War of the Ring
- War of the Sky Cities
- Wargaming magazine
- Wild West
- Year of the Phoenix
