= Enforcers (role-playing game) =

1987 superhero role-playing game

A Super-Powered Science Fiction Role-Playing Game
- 1st edition, cover art by Christine Mansfield
- Designers: Gary Bernard; Charles Mann; Larry Troth
- Illustrators: Albert Deschesne; Christine Mansfield
- Publishers: 21st Century Games
- Publication: 1987; 39 years ago
- Genres: Superhero
- ISBN: 978-0944942000

Enforcers is a near-future superhero role-playing game published by 21st Century Games in 1987.

== Description ==
In 2046, an international conflict sliding towards World War III is only halted by an alien invasion. Then superheroes appear. This marks the beginning of Enforcers, where players take on the role of superheroes who fight both supervillains and aliens.

Unlike other contemporaneous superhero games, Enforcers is "generic", not affiliated with an existing line of comics such as DC Comics or Marvel Comics. Character creation uses a flexible point-buy system to purchase superpowers. Players can purchase more superpowers by adding weaknesses to their character.

Math formulae figure prominently in character creation as well as combat and skills resolution. Critic Dave Nalle noted a "reliance on unusually complex formulae in all areas of the mechanics", and Lawrence Schick suggested a calculator is required for play. To circumvent this for character creation, coding for a character generation program usable on an Atari 1040ST is included.

Second edition, cover art by Albert Deschesne

== Publication history ==
In the mid-1980s, superhero role-playing games such as Champions and Villains and Vigilantes were popular. Enforcers, a generic superhero game — that is, not based on a specific line of comics — was designed by Gary Bernard, Charles Mann, and Larry Troth, with and was published by 21st Century Games in 1987 as a 112-page book with cover and interior art by Christine Mansfield. 21st Century released a second edition the same year that retained Mansfield's interior art, but sported new cover art by Albert Duchesne.

Two adventures were published for the game: The End of a Legend (1988) and The Knights of Beverly Hills (1988).

== Reception ==
In Issue 42 of Abyss, Dave Nalle called the art by Christine Mansfield "some of the worst art ever published. The interior sketches are jarringly amateurish." Nalle also felt the game had little original to offer in a marketplace that was saturated with superhero RPGs, writing "For a superhero game to be a success today it would have to be truly original and creative, and Enforcers is just more of the same." Nalle also found the complex formulae needed for combat made the game "unplayable as well as uninspiring." Nalle concluded, "Mechanically Enforcers is a mess. It is exceptionally complex, poorly organized and screams for examples everywhere. There is no reason to pick Enforcers over more playable, more flexible superhero systems like Champions or Challengers."

Stewart Wieck reviewed the second edition of Enforcers in White Wolf #11, and noted elements borrowed from other generic superhero RPGs such as Villains and Vigilantes and Champions that had been combined "into a cohesive whole." Wieck thought that "combat is relatively easy to run" and noted "Whereas in other super-hero games combat often becomes a gigantic slugfest where the winner is the one who can slug the best, defensive actions in Enforcers makes the combat a little more a thinking man's game." However Wieck felt the game had one major drawback: a lack of background information about the world in 2046. "Short of mentioning colonies on nearby heavenly bodies and a vaccine for the AIDS virus, we have no idea of what sort of discoveries/advancements have been made." Wieck closed by noting that the cover art for the second edition was much more attractive than the first edition, and hoped that Christine Mansfield's interior art would be replaced in the next edition. Wieck gave the game an overall rating of 8 out of 10.

In his 1990 book The Complete Guide to Role-Playing Games, game critic Rick Swan noted that the game "emphasizes combat to the exclusion of nearly everything else ... There aren't many opportunities for actual role-playing in Enforcers, mainly due to the puzzling absence of background information." However, Swan did find that the rules were "uncluttered and a lot of fun to read; the enthusiasm of [the designers] is evident on every page." Swan concluded by giving the game a rating of 2.5 out of 4, saying, "Enforcers is better suited for brief skirmishes than extended adventures."
