= By the Gods =

Tabletop role-playing game designed by David F. Nalle

By the Gods is a role-playing game published by Ragnarok Enterprises in 1986.

== Description ==
By the Gods: Adventure in the Realm of Myths is a mythological fantasy system, similar to the Ysgarth rules, with a 16-page rulebook and a 40-page "Pantheon" book. The game includes three scenarios.

== Publication history ==
By the Gods was designed by David F. Nalle and published by Ragnarok Enterprises in 1986 as two digest-sized books (40 pages and 16 pages).
