= Middle Passage (disambiguation) =

The Middle Passage was a transoceanic segment of the Atlantic slave trade.

Middle Passage or The Middle Passage may also refer to:

- "Middle Passage" (poem), a 1945 poem by Robert Hayden
- Middle Passage (novel), a 1990 book by Charles Johnson
- Middle Passage, 1983 board game set in the Age of Sail
- The Middle Passage (book), a 1962 book by V. S. Naipaul
- The Middle Passage (film), a 1999 docudrama
- The Middle Passage (album), by Immortal Technique
