= Enforcement (disambiguation) =

Enforcement is the process of ensuring compliance with laws, regulations, rules, standards, or social norms.

Enforcement may also refer to:

- Law enforcement, a system organized to enforce the law
- Enforcement of foreign judgments, the recognition of judgments rendered in another jurisdiction
- Enforcement discretion, the power to choose whether or how to punish a person who has violated the law
- Enforcement (film), a 2020 Danish film also known as Shorta

== See also ==
- Enforcer (disambiguation)
