= Creatures Fair & Fell =

Creatures Fair & Fell is a 1982 role-playing game supplement published by Ragnarok Enterprises for Ysgarth.

== Contents ==
Creatures Fair & Fell is a supplement in which a collection of 33 magical, mythical, and natural creatures is offered, along with high-level non-player characters for gamemasters to incorporate into their campaigns. It includes updates to the combat mechanics—covering damage, hit locations, blood loss, and armor combinations—as well as a Q&A section and a 4-page pull-out adventure titled "Llychlyn Isle", which utilizes many of the new creatures. The supplement provides detailed descriptions and mythologically accurate powers for its entries.

Creatures Fair & Fell introduces 33 new monsters alongside expanded combat rules, a rules Q&A section, and a selection of pregenerated characters. It also features a short adventure scenario titled "Llychlyn Isle."

== Publication history ==
Creatures Fair & Fell was written by David F. Nalle and published by Ragnarok Enterprises in 1983 as a digest-sized 28-page book.

It was published as "Ysgarth Rule System Supplement Two".

== Reception ==
Jerry Epperson reviewed Creatures Fair & Fell for Fantasy Gamer magazine and stated that "Creatures Fair and Fell is definitely usable as a supplement for YRS, It fills this role quite well and gamemasters can learn a good lesson in character design by studying the NPC examples, but it is not up to the usual high standards of its company's other products. I can guardedly recommend it to all of those with an interest in Ysgarth material, but others will find little of use for general [RP gaming]."
