= London by Night: Adventure in a Victorian City =

1988 role-playing game supplement

London by Night: Adventure in a Victorian City is a sourcebook published by Ragnarok Enterprises in 1984 as a supplement to the multi-genre role-playing game To Challenge Tomorrow. The book provides details about life in the city of London during the 1890s, as well as some mini-scenarios.

== Description ==
For To Challenge Tomorrow gamemasters looking for campaign or adventure ideas set in Victorian England, London by Night provides a detailed background of 19th-century London, including history, geographical landmarks, social stratas, possible careers and occupations, the cost of living, political factions and popular movements of the time, and the various levels of government. For campaigns involving the supernatural, the book also gives details of occult activity and occult groups. A map of Victorian London and a reprint of Baedeker's 1894 Guide to London and Its Environs are included.

Game statistics for notable non-player characters such as Sherlock Holmes and Dr. Watson are also given.

Four short scenarios are included, two concerning the occult and supernatural occurrences, and two of a more investigative nature – one involving Egyptian mythology, and the other an encounter with Sherlock Holmes.

== Publication history ==
Dave Nalle designed the multi-genre role-playing game To Challenge Tomorrow with the concept that the game could be used for role-playing adventures set in any era from medieval times to the far future. It was published by Ragnarok Enterprises in 1983.

Ragnarok also released a number of supplements in 1984 including London by Night, a two-booklet set created by Dave Nalle and packaged in a plastic bag. It was just the second role-playing game supplement to focus on 19th-century London. (Game historian Sean Patrick Fannon could only recall one previously published role-playing game with a similar focus, a little-known British product titled Victorian Adventure by Stephen Jennison-Smith that had been published the preceding year.)

== Reception ==
In Issue 72 of Space Gamer, William A. Barton thought the "great deal of data" would be of use to gamemasters of other role-playing games such as Call of Cthulhu or Mercenaries, Spies & Private Eyes who needed information about Victorian London, especially the section listing literary sources. Barton also commented that the reprint of the Baedeker Guide was "especially useful, as [it] offers more information [about 1894 London] than can be easily found in most contemporary sources." Barton liked the four scenarios, especially the two occult-focused adventures, finding they were "well conceived ... if a bit sketchy." The only problems Barton found were all production related, noting "Most of the maps are difficult to read, and the reproduced type of the Baedeker is so tiny that in places a magnifying glass might be necessary." Despite this, Barton concluded "London by Night is an excellent, informative play-aid. Even a Victorian London buff such as myself was able to find a few bits of 'new data.' I recommend it to any gamer interested in the era."

In the October 1988 issue of Games International, Kevin W. Jacklin found the production quality of this product, especially the map of London, was very poor and warned readers to "be prepared for eyestrain!" However, Jacklin was impressed by the inclusion of the Baedeker's Guide from 1894, calling that section of the book "a gem". Jacklin also thought two of the four scenarios that were set up as straight investigative adventures "serve as excellent examples of detective scenario construction."

In his 1990 book The Complete Guide to Role-Playing Games, game critic Rick Swan recommended it, saying "Players with a taste for the occult should investigate London by Night, which includes some fascinating background material on Victorian London and several intriguing scenarios."
