= The Wine of the Moon =

1982 role-playing game supplement

The Wine of the Moon is a 1982 fantasy role-playing game supplement published by Ragnarok Games for Ysgarth Rule System.

== Contents ==
The Wine of the Moon is a supplement containing explanations, expansions, and corrections to the material covered in the first edition Ysgarth rules, and presents rules for four new spellcasting classes, five priestly orders, and 32 new skills for characters.

== Publication history ==
The Wine of the Moon is the first supplement published by Ragnarok Enterprises to support the first edition of the Ysgarth Rule System.

== Reception ==
Jerry Epperson reviewed The Wine of the Moon in Space Gamer No. 71. Epperson commented that "Overall, The Wine of the Moon has a few faults, but its merits far outweigh its liabilities. For owners of the YRS, this is a 'must buy': for those who don't own YRS, though, there probably isn't that much generic material to cull from it to offset the asking price. However, if any of the supplement's material sounds interesting, you could do far worse than owning it and YRS both."
