= Renaissance fair =

Outdoor festival that emulates historical periods

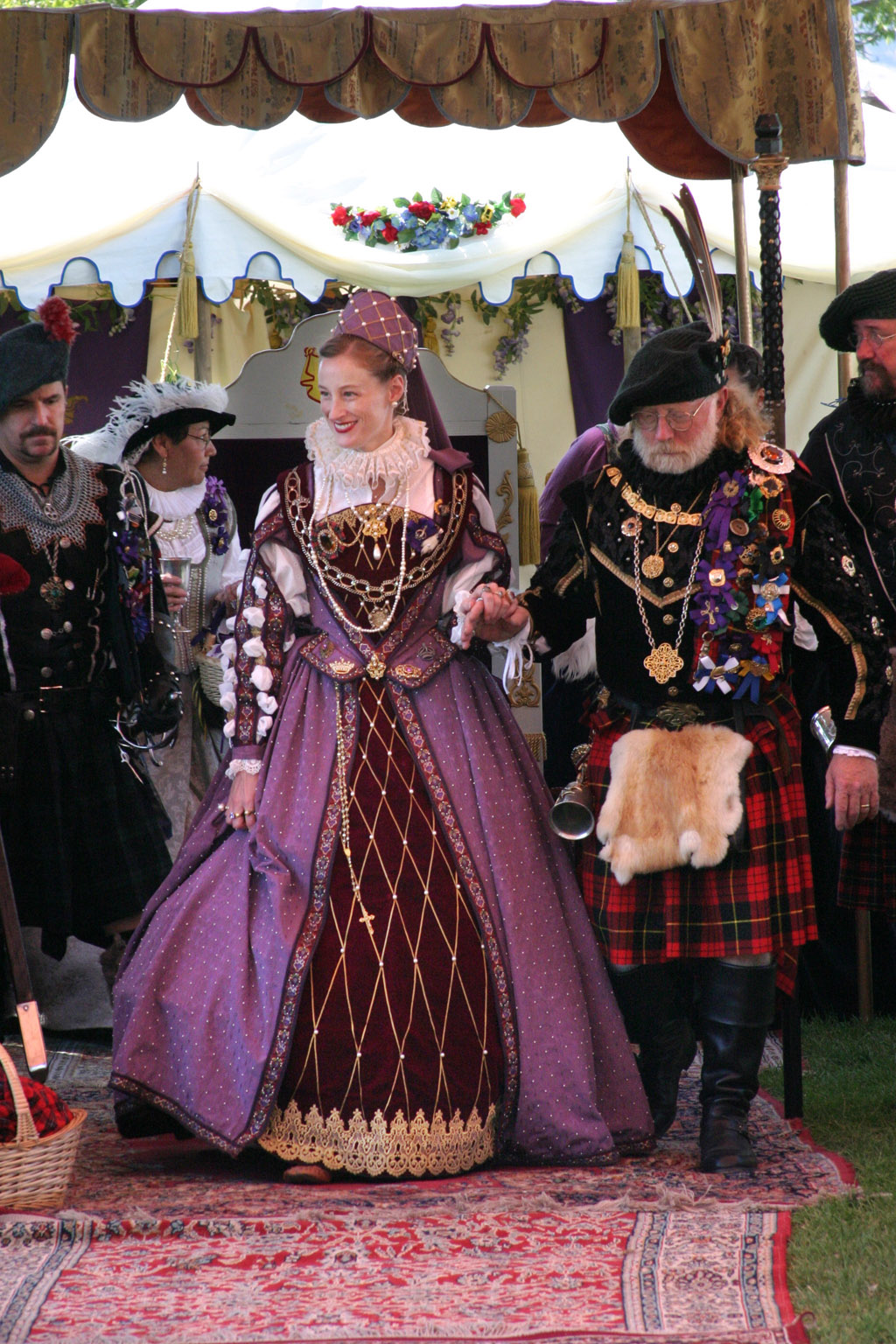
An actress playing the role of Mary, Queen of Scots

A renaissance festival (also known as medieval fair, renaissance faire or ren faire) is an outdoor gathering that aims to entertain its guests by recreating a historical setting, most often the English Renaissance. These events are a form of living history, in which participants and performers simulate life in a past era through costumes, performances, and historically inspired activities, creating an immersive experience for visitors.

Renaissance festivals generally include costumed entertainers or fair-goers, musical and theatrical acts, art and handicrafts for sale, and festival food. These fairs are open to the public and typically commercial. Some are permanent theme parks, while others are short-term events in a fairground, winery, or other large spaces. Some Renaissance fairs offer campgrounds for those who wish to stay more than one day.

Many Renaissance fairs are set during the reign of Queen Elizabeth I of England. Some are set earlier, during the reign of Henry VIII, or in other countries, such as France. Others are set outside the era of the Renaissance; these may include earlier medieval periods such as the Viking Age or later periods such as the Golden Age of Piracy. Some engage in deliberate 'time travel' by encouraging participants to wear costumes representing several eras in a broad time period. Renaissance fairs encourage visitors to engage with costumes and audience participation, often renting outfits to fairgoers. Many welcome fantasy elements like wizards and elves.

== Characteristics ==
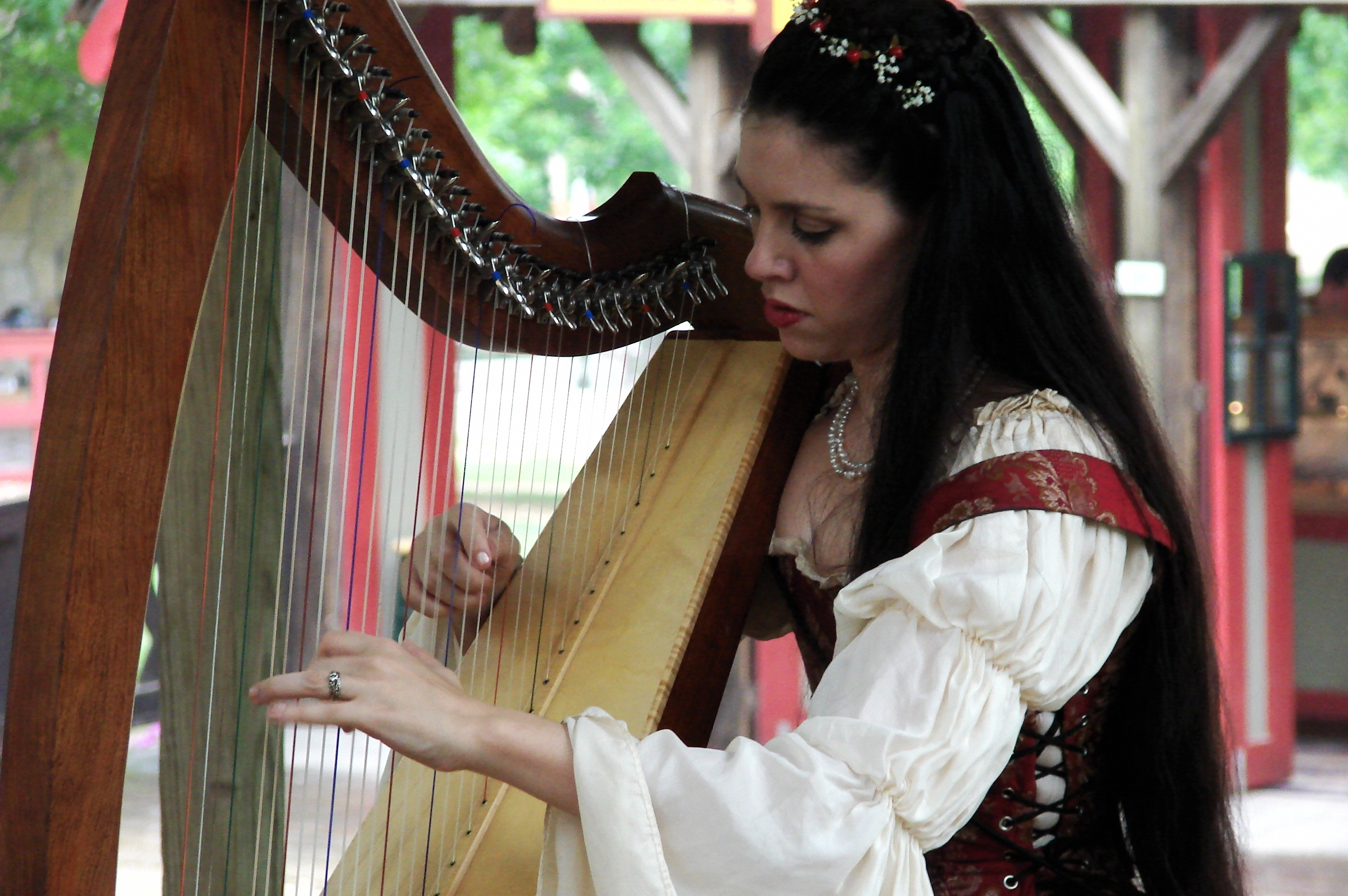
Harp player at Scarborough Faire, Texas

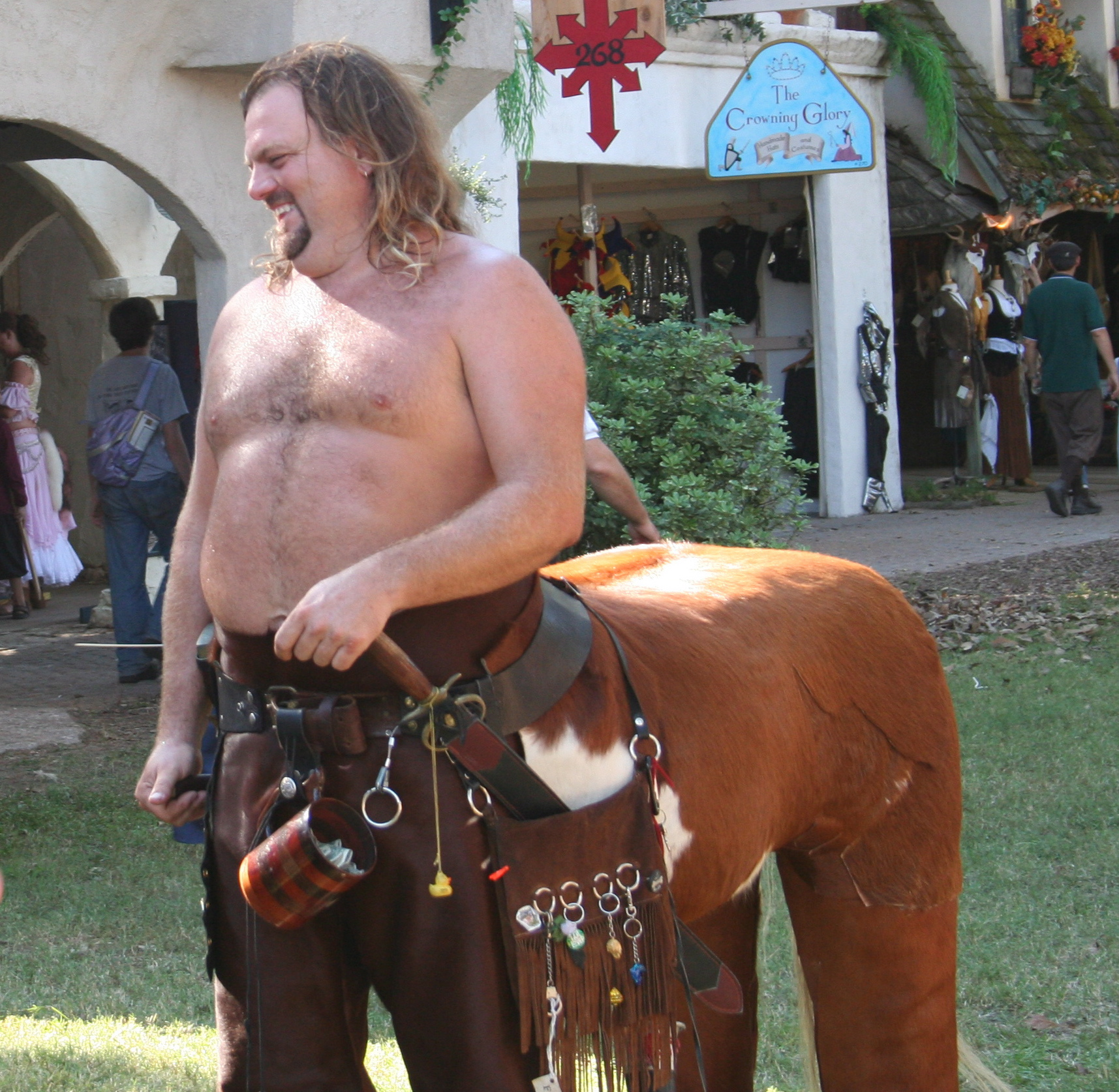
Fantasy elements, such as centaurs, are welcomed at some Renaissance fairs.

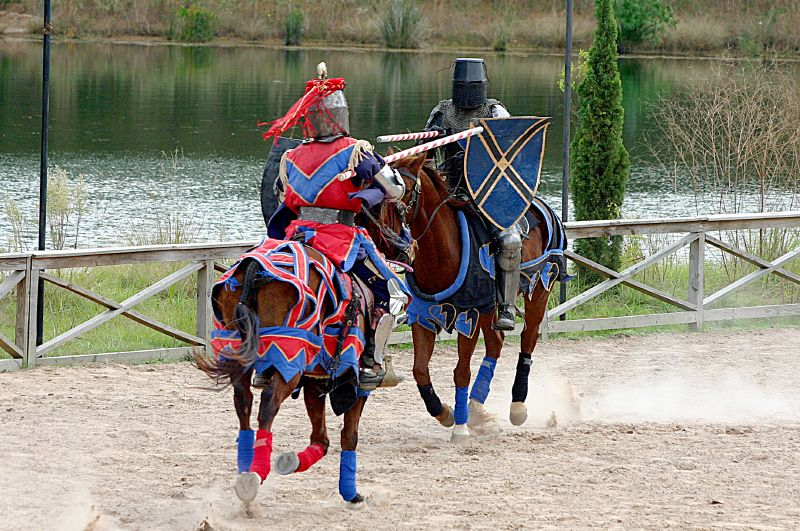
Jousting knights perform on horseback at the Texas Renaissance Festival

=== Historical time periods ===
Most Renaissance fairs are arranged to represent an imagined English village during the reign of Elizabeth I, often thought of as the height of the English Renaissance.

Within a modern Renaissance festival, there are stages or performance areas set up for scheduled shows, such as plays in Shakespearean or commedia dell'arte traditions, as well as anachronistic audience participation in comedy routines. Other performances include dancers, magicians, musicians, jugglers, and singers. Between the stages, the streets ('lanes') are lined with stores ('shoppes') and stalls where independent vendors sell themed handcrafts, clothing, books, and artwork.

=== Food ===
Renaissance fairs typically feature a wide variety of foods inspired by both medieval cuisine and typical American fair foods like corn dogs. Some foods, like turkey legs, steak on a stick, and bread bowls have become iconic of Renaissance festivals. Beer, mead, and wine are also common.

=== Activities and performances ===
Games include typical fair events, such as archery, axe-throwing, and dunk tanks. Rides are typically not machine-powered; various animal rides and human-powered swings are common, as are live animal displays and falconry exhibitions. Larger Renaissance fairs often include a joust as a main attraction. PETA and Born Free USA have protested the use of elephants and camels at the Maryland Renaissance Festival and Arizona Renaissance Festival.

In addition to staged performances, a major attraction of Renaissance fairs are professional and amateur crowds of actors who play historical figures, roaming the fairgrounds and interacting with visitors. Some allow visitors to bring peace-bonded weapons, while others only allow fair employees to wear them. The Renaissance fair subculture's word for costumed guests is 'playtrons,' a portmanteau of the words player and patron. This adds enjoyment to guests' experience by 'getting into the act' as Renaissance Lords and Ladies, peasants, pirates, belly dancers, or fantasy characters. However, many Renaissance fairs discourage interaction between the official cast and so-called 'playtrons.'

Most fairs have an end-of-the-day ritual parade, dance, or concert where all employees gather and bid farewell to the patrons.

Renaissance fairs are staged around the world at different times of the year. Fair vendors, actors, and crew often work by going from event to event as one fair ends and another begins.

== History in the United States ==
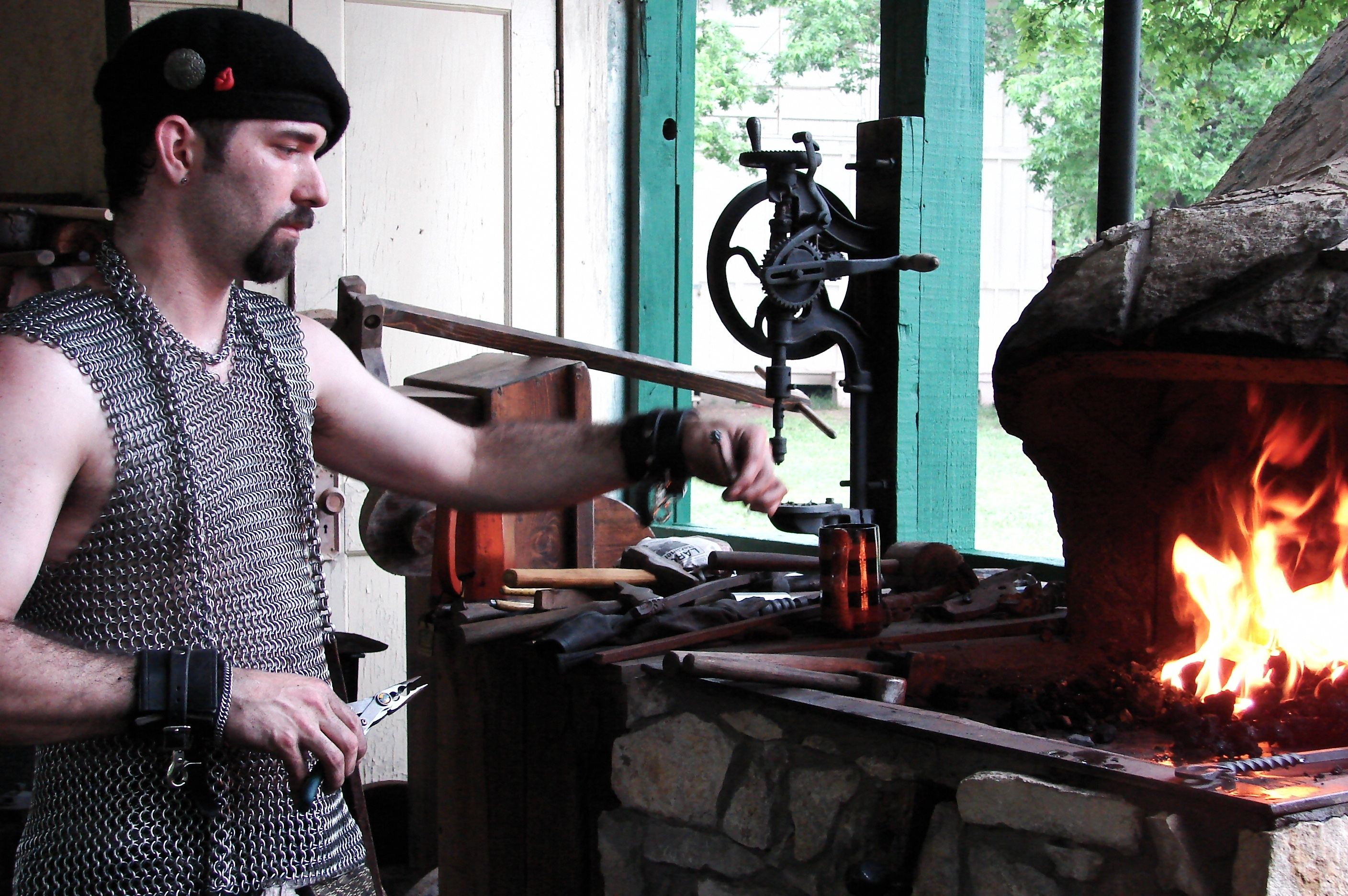
Blacksmith at Scarborough Faire, Texas

In post-World War II America, there was a resurgence of interest in medieval and Renaissance culture. Folk musician and traditionalist John Langstaff gained popularity in the 1950s as part of an early music revival trend. In 1957, Langstaff hosted "A Christmas Masque of Traditional Revels" in New York City, and another the following year in Washington, D.C. A televised version was broadcast on the Hallmark Hall of Fame in 1966 which included Dustin Hoffman playing the part of the dragon slain by Saint George. In 1971, Langstaff established a permanent Christmas Revels in Cambridge, Massachusetts.

In 1963, Los Angeles schoolteacher Phyllis Patterson held a small Renaissance fair as a class activity, using the backyard of her Laurel Canyon home in the Hollywood Hills as the fairgrounds. After graduating high school, Patterson ran a show called Phyl's Playhouse for two years that she claims contained “the essence of what the Renaissance faire was”. The idea of the show was to teach through the arts with a focus on education and culture. Patterson left her show to earn her degree and taught high school English till the birth of her first child. She found a job as a theater teacher through a notice from the Wonderland Youth Center where she, once again, focused on teaching history. Patterson found one of the most popular theatrical forms with the children was the commedia dell’arte, a comedic form of entertainment from the Italian Renaissance. With many of the residents of Laurel Canyon working in the theater industry, the class was able to make costumes and get supplies for their first mini-Renaissance fair.

On May 11 and 12 in the same year, Patterson and her husband, Ron Patterson, presented the first "Renaissance Pleasure Faire" as a one-weekend fundraiser for a radio station KPFK, drawing some eight thousand people. The Living History Center designed the fair to resemble a springtime market fair of the period. Patterson believes part of its success came from the Hollywood blacklists from McCarthyism. According to screenwriter and journalist Michael Walker, Laurel Canyon had “longtime status as a haven for free thinkers.” When the anticommunist blacklist started, many residents of Laurel Canyon (especially actors who could not remain anonymous) were left without a job. Because of this, gifted and skilled people were free to lend their talents to both the backyard fair and the first full fair.

Many original booths were free-of-charge reenactments of historical activities, including printing presses and blacksmiths. The first commercial vendors were artisans and food merchants, and had to demonstrate historical accuracy or plausibility for their wares. Volunteers were organized into "guilds" to focus on specific reenactment roles (musicians, military, Celtic clans, peasants, etc.). Both actors and vendors were required to stay "in character" while working by speaking with period language, accents, and mannerisms.

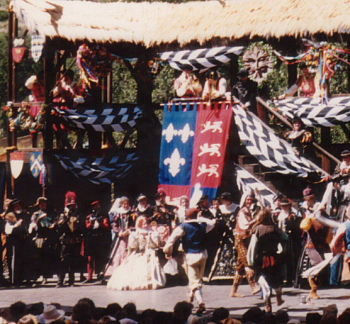
Morris dancers entertain Queen Elizabeth, Renaissance Pleasure Faire, Agoura, circa 1986

The original Renaissance Pleasure Faire of Southern California (RPFS) was held in the spring of 1966 at the Paramount Ranch located in Agoura, California, focusing on the practices of old English springtime markets and "Maying" customs. In 1967, the Pattersons created a fall Renaissance fair with a harvest festival theme at what is now China Camp State Park in San Rafael, California. The fall fair was moved in 1971 to the Black Point Forest in Novato, California. Both fairs developed into local traditions. Similar festivals began popping up around the country, including the Texas Renaissance Festival which is regarded as the largest nationally.

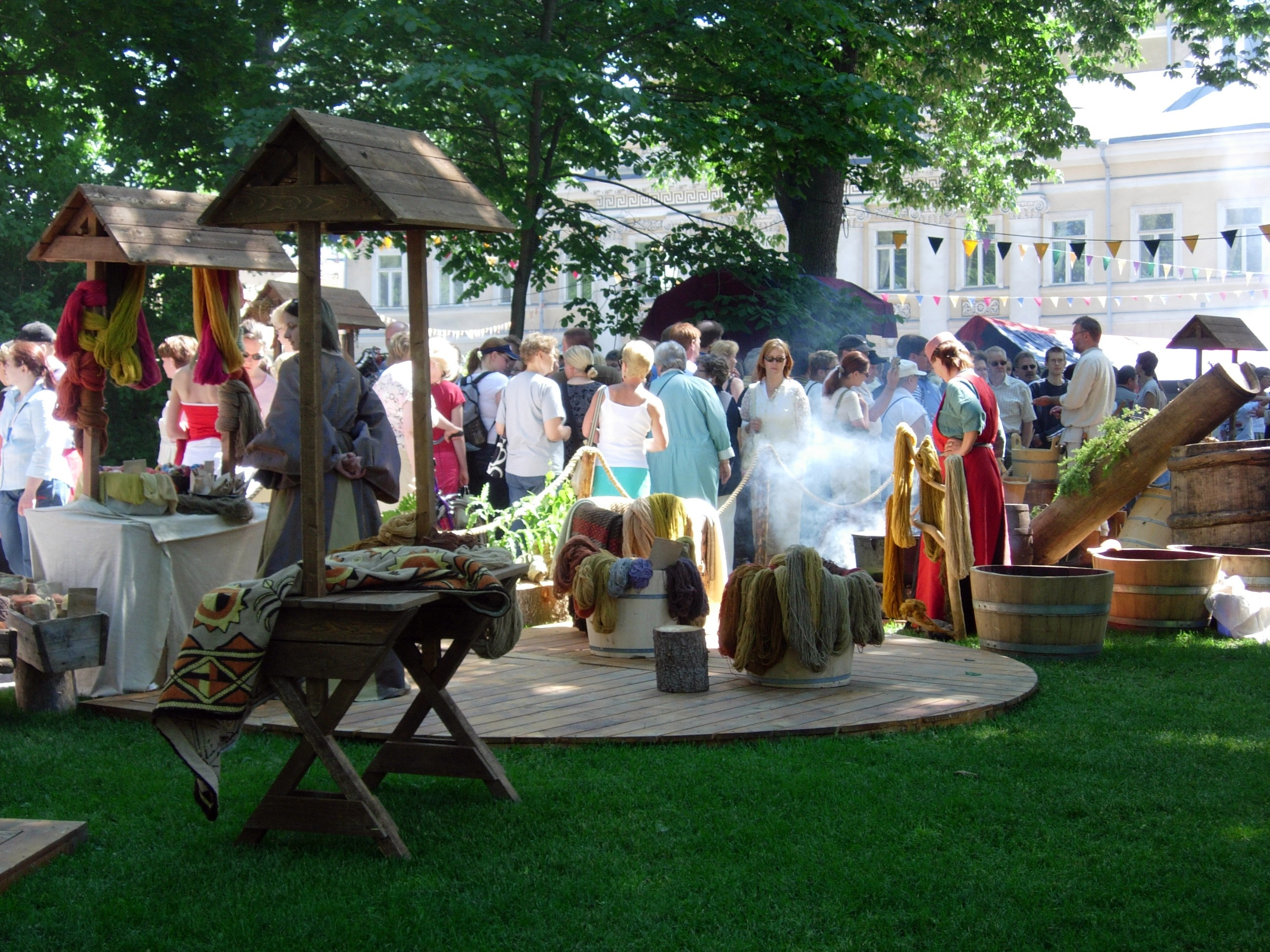
Booths at the Medieval Market of Turku in Turku, Finland

Although historical reenactments are not exclusive to the United States, Renaissance fairs are largely an American variation on the idea of reenactments. European historical fairs, such as those held at Kentwell Hall in Suffolk, England, operate more on the living history museum model, in which an actual historic site is staffed by reenactors who explain historical life to modern visitors, rather than acting in a role.

In recent years, American-style Renaissance fairs have made inroads in other countries. Germany has seen a very similar phenomenon since the 1980s, and fairs have grown increasingly popular in Canada and Australia since the mid-1990s.

Spinoffs of Renaissance fairs also include fairs set in other time periods, such as Christmas fairs set in Charles Dickens' London.

== Names ==
Renaissance fairs have several variant names, many of which use old-fashioned spellings such as faire or fayre. These spellings originate from the Middle English feire (variant spellings include feyre, faire, and fayre), which comes from the Anglo-French word feire. They can also be referred to as Elizabethan, Medieval, or Tudor fairs or festivals.

A German Mittelaltermarkt (literally "medieval market") resembles a Renaissance fair. Many Catalan towns hold Mercats Medievals (literally "medieval markets") as part of their annual festivities.

== See also ==
- Armored combat (sport)
- List of Renaissance and Medieval fairs
- Medieval reenactment
- Renaissance Magazine
- Society for Creative Anachronism
- American Princess (2019 TV series)
