= The Enforcers =

The Enforcers may refer to:

- Enforcers (comics), a Marvel Comics villain team, enemies of Spider-Man
- New Enforcers, another group of Marvel Comics supervillains
- Enforcers (SWAT Kats), an animated series
- A criminal group in Jackie Chan Adventures; see Dark Hand

== See also ==
- Enforcers or Enforcer (disambiguation)
