= Scarborough Renaissance Festival =

Annual festival held in Waxahachie, TX

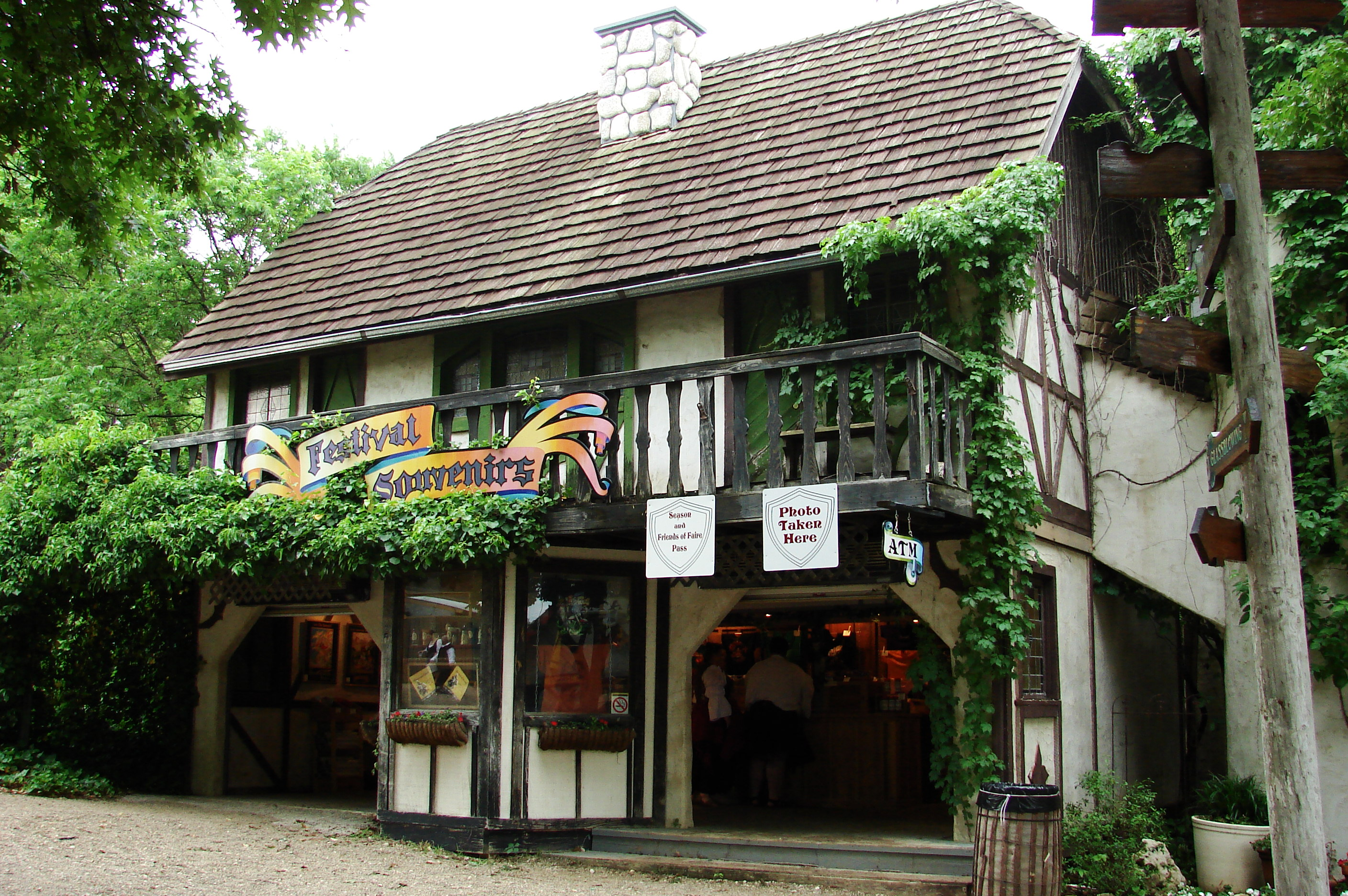
- 16th century English structure
- Status: Active
- Genre: Renaissance Fair
- Begins: Early April
- Ends: Late May
- Frequency: Annually
- Venue: 2511 FM 66
- Locations: Waxahachie, Texas
- Coordinates: 32.360291°N 96.889696°W
- Years active: 45
- Attendance: 200,000 (average)
- Area: 165-acre (0.67 km^{2})
- Major events: Carving & Sculpting; Chivalry; Falconry; Folklore; Glasswork; Metalsmithing; Music; Scarborough Academy of Performing Art; Theatre; Themed Weekends
- Website: www.srfestival.com

Scarborough Renaissance Festival, more commonly known as Scarborough Faire, is a renaissance fair in Waxahachie, Texas.

Scarborough Faire's first run was in 1981. The festival is open Saturdays and Sundays from the first weekend in April until Memorial Day Monday. The festival is historically based in the 16th century, under the reign of King Henry VIII. The festival is 35 acres (140,000 m^{2}) site. There are over 20 stages with more than 200 performances. Three full combat jousting shows take place each day. There are about 100 cast members that make up the characters at Scarborough Renaissance Festival.

The Scarborough Renaissance Festival also features an Artisan Marketplace with 200 shops selling goods such as candles, soaps, jewelry, children's toys and even musical instruments. Many of the craftsmen selling their goods also provide demonstrations on how the items are made. The festival also features 5 food Kitchens - a selection of food stalls serving turkey legs (the festival serves over 20 tons of this signature food item per year), food skewers, sandwiches, ice cream and other items.

== Special programs ==
Special programs at Scarborough include "Friends of the Faire", an exclusive festival membership with benefits, Group Sales and Wedding Packages, which you may purchase to have your own Renaissance-themed wedding in the festival's special Wedding Garden. Plus daily beer & wine tasting events.

== Gallery ==
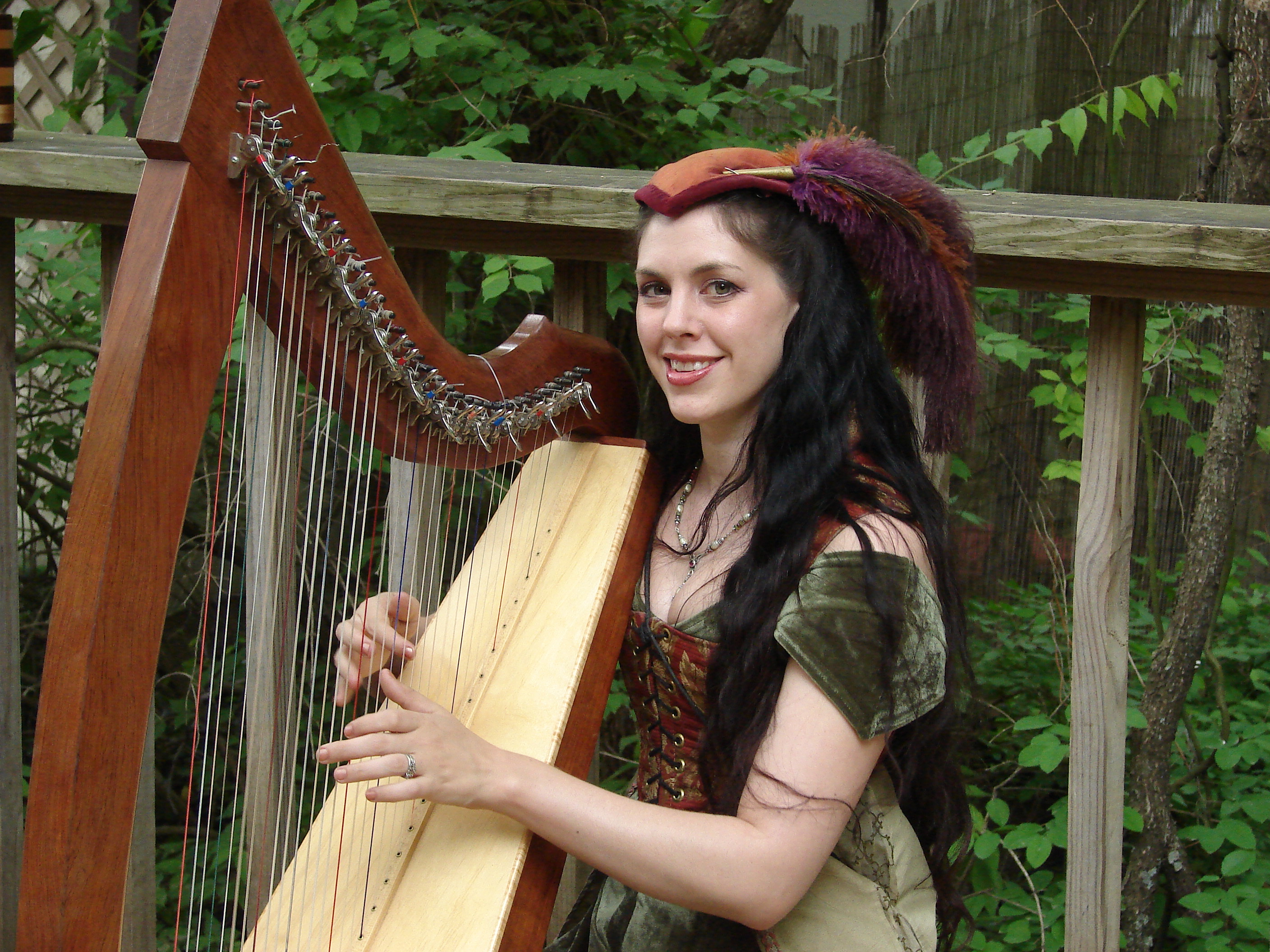
Harpist

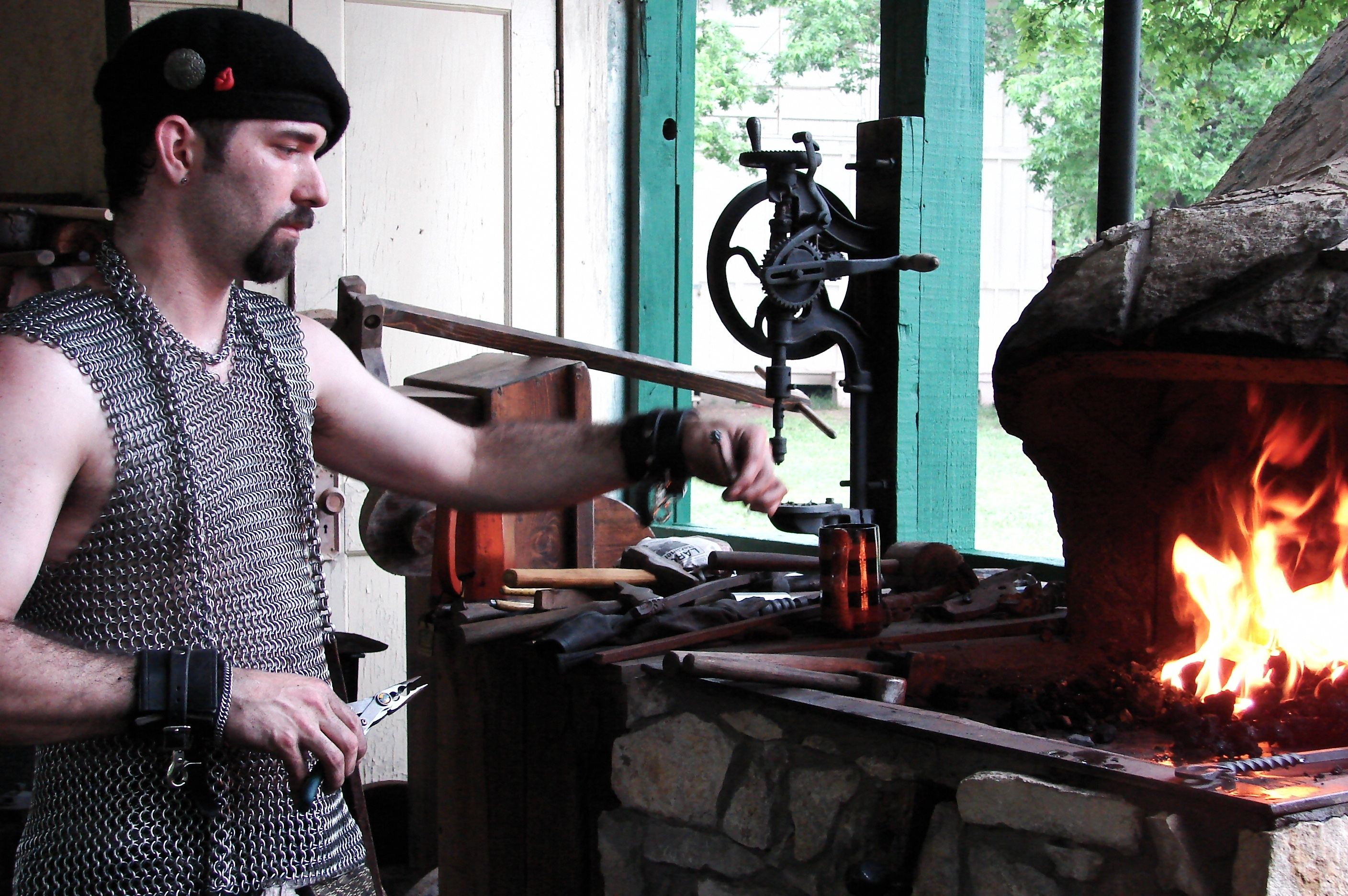
Metalworking artisan

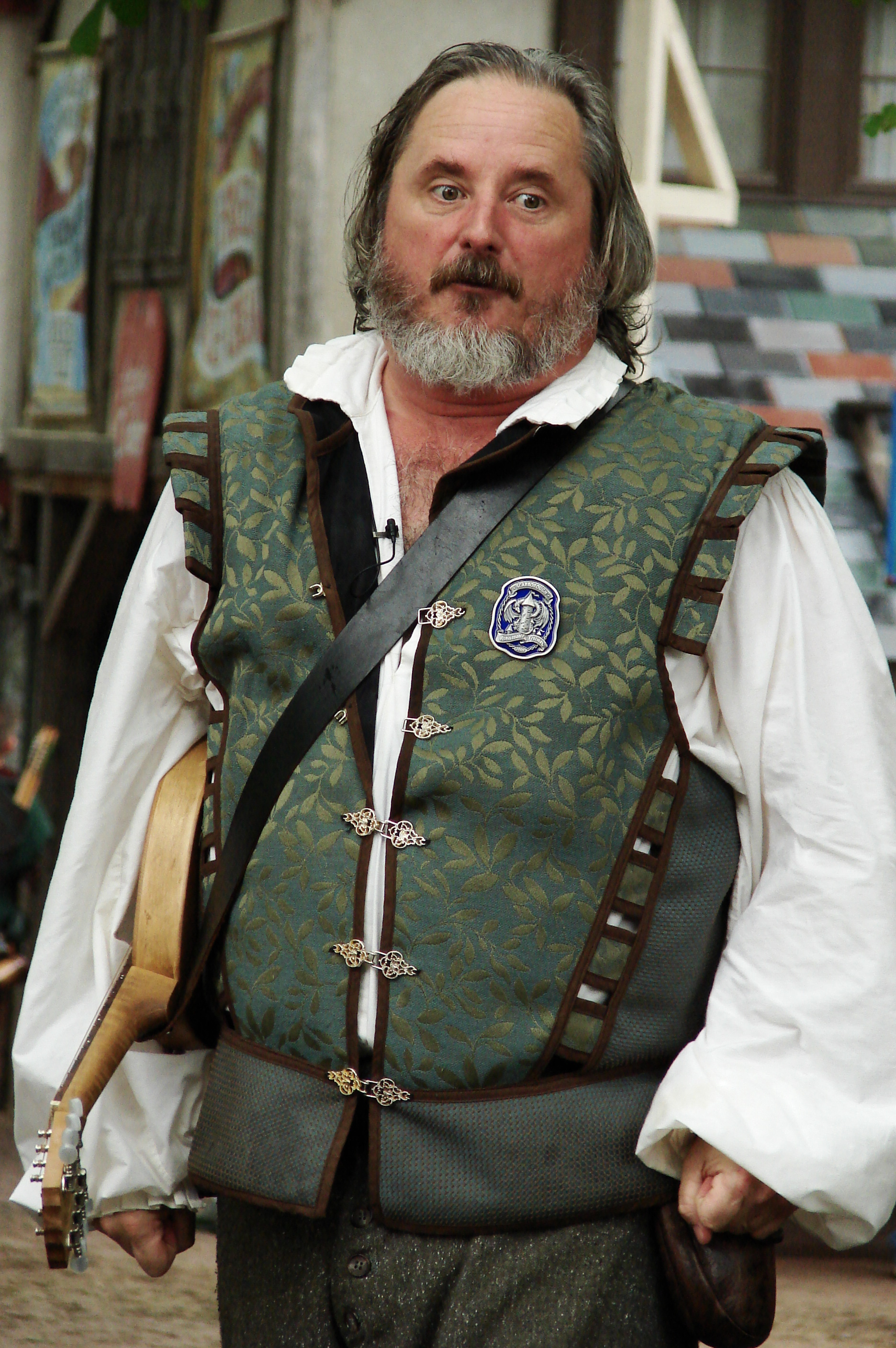
Entertainer, Zilch the Torysteller, in period style dress

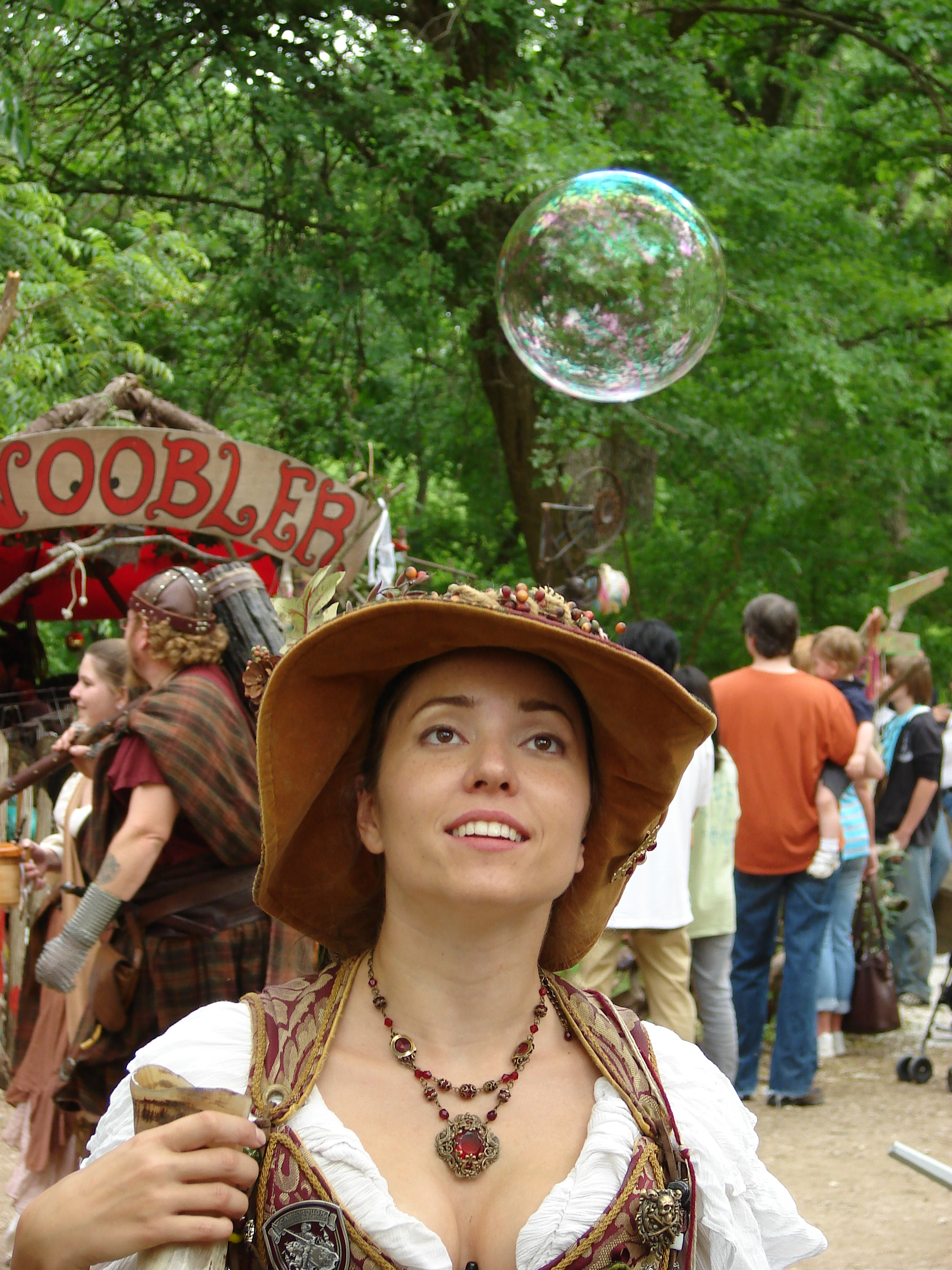
Participant in period style dress

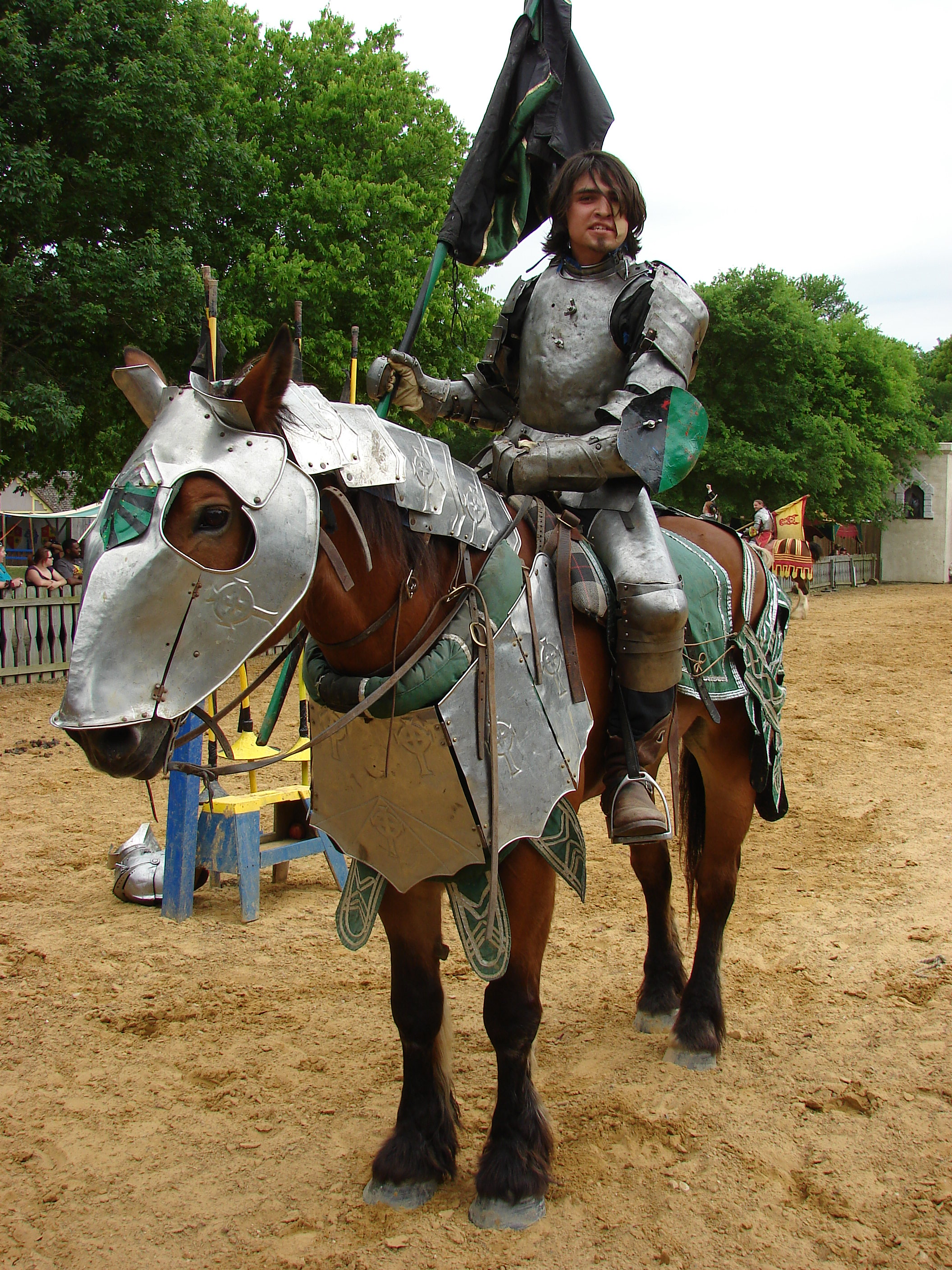
Jousting and horsemanship

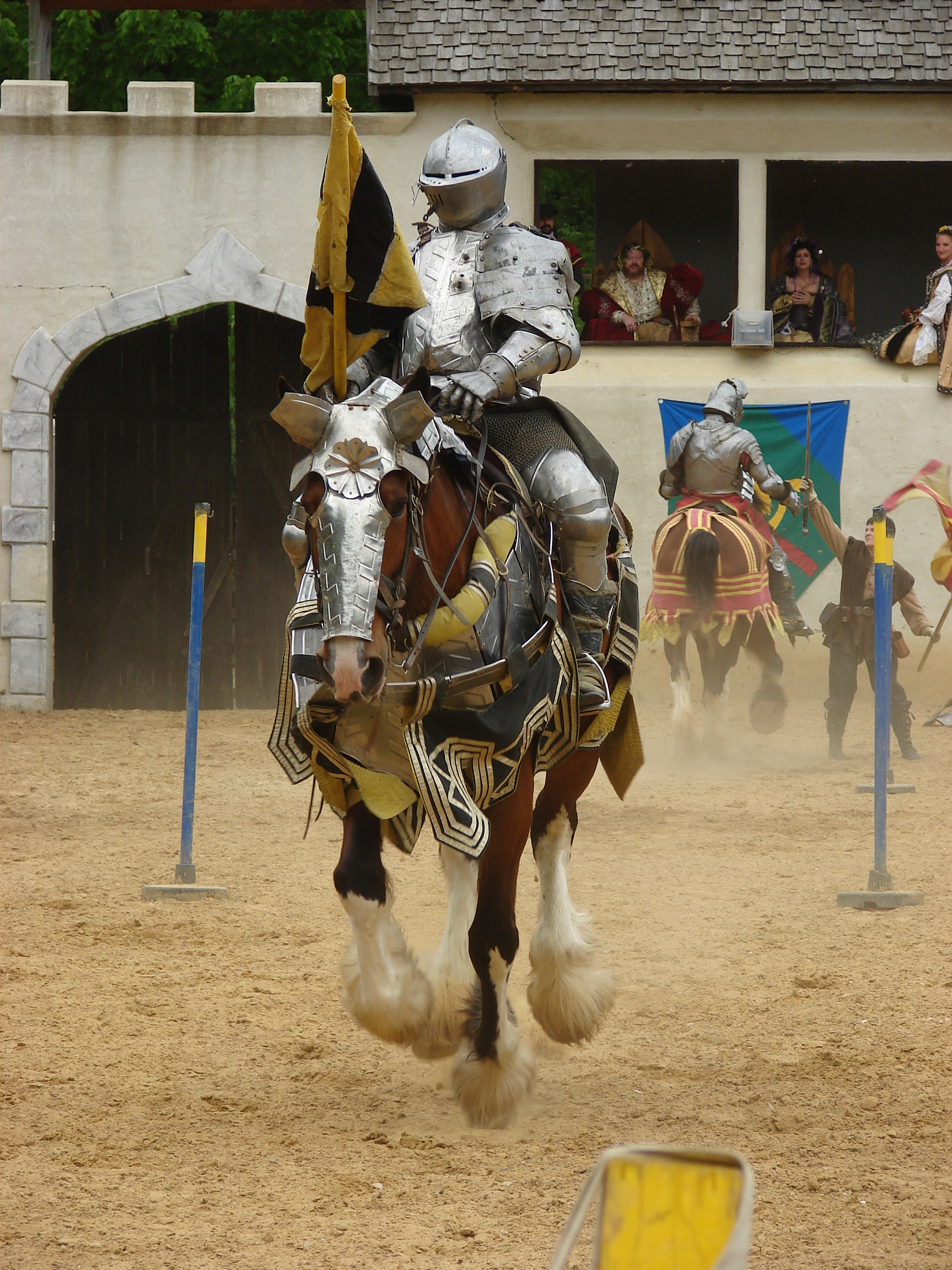
Jousting and horsemanship

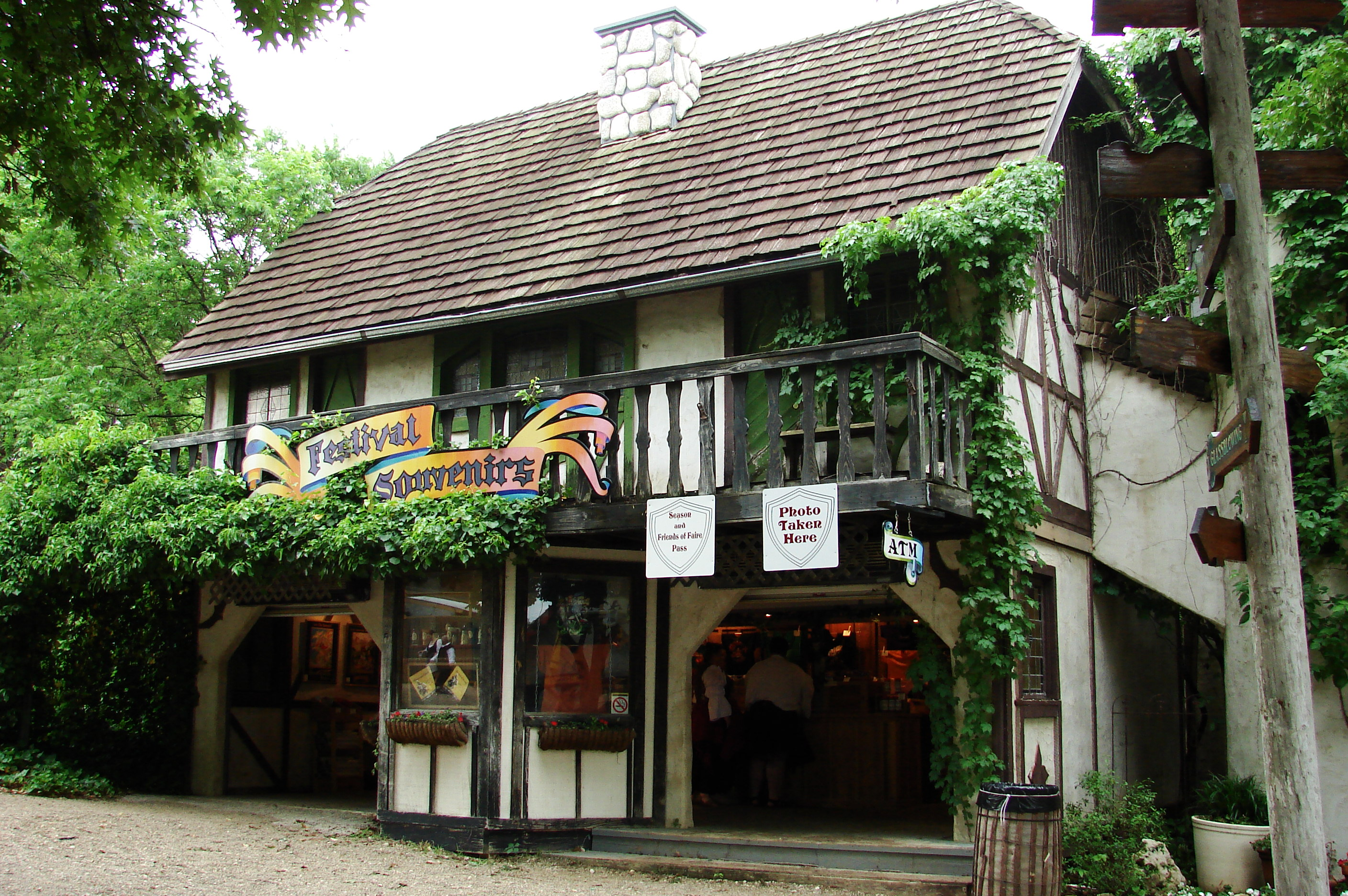
Period style buildings

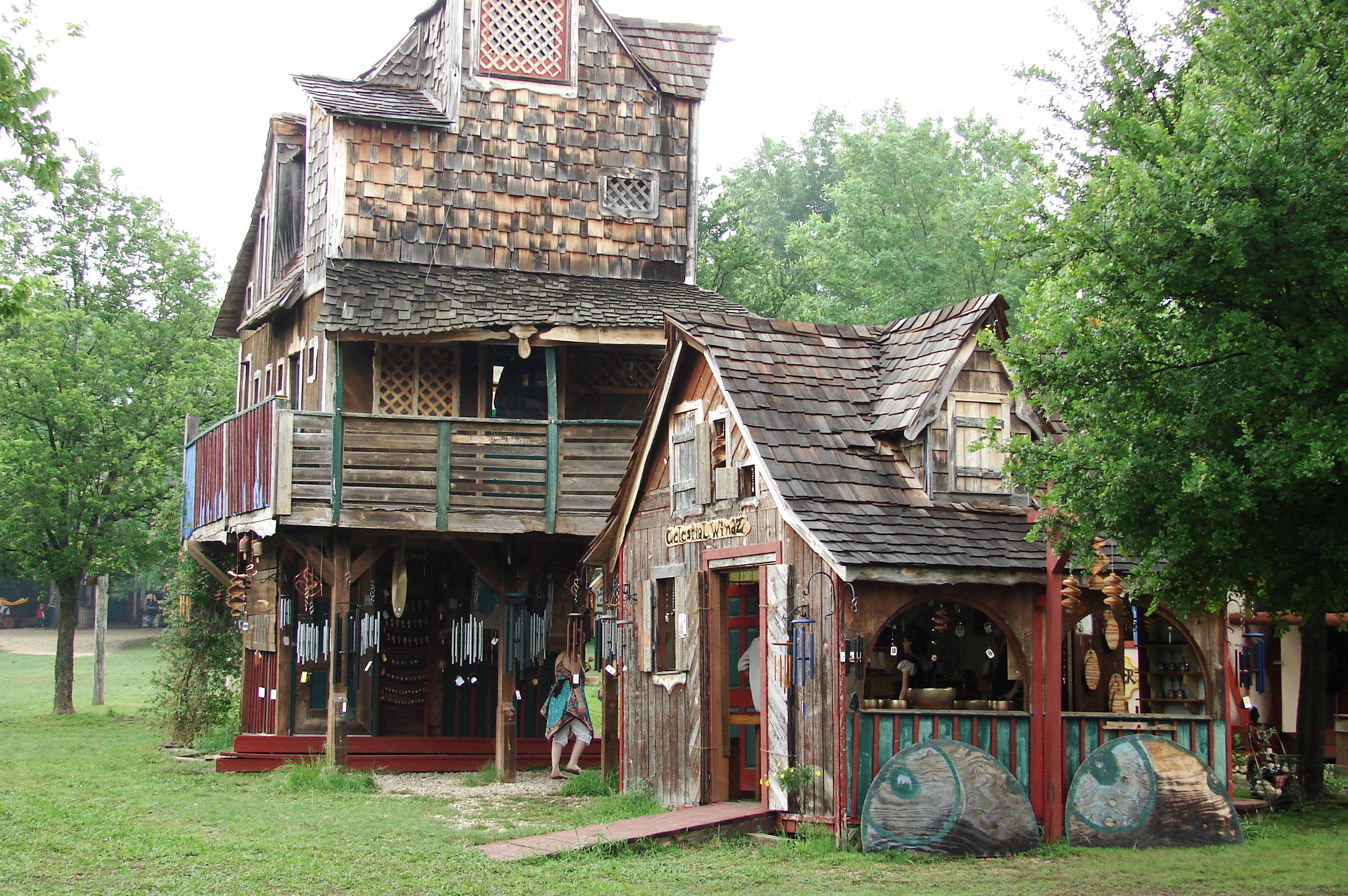
Period style buildings

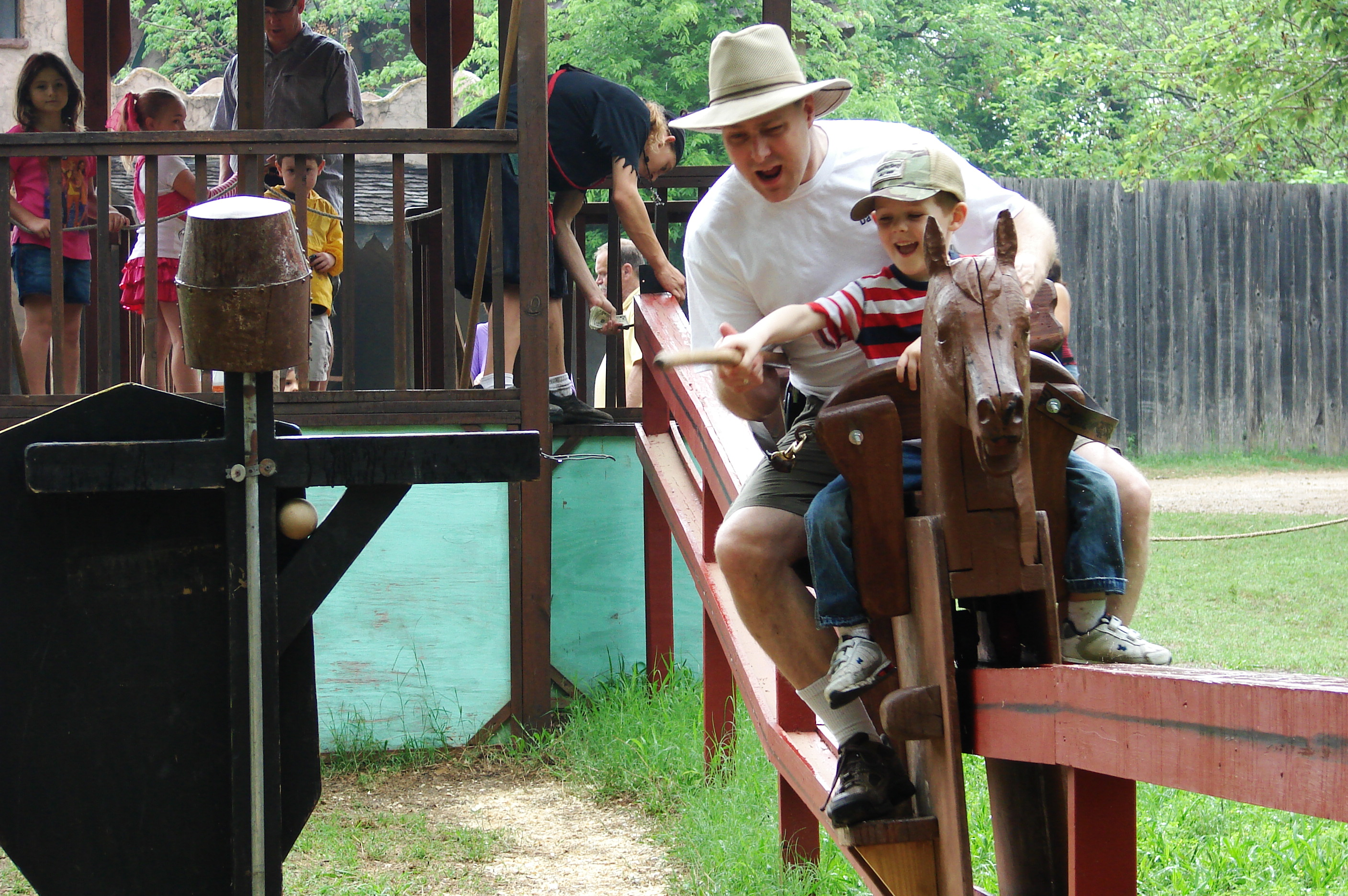
Games and rides

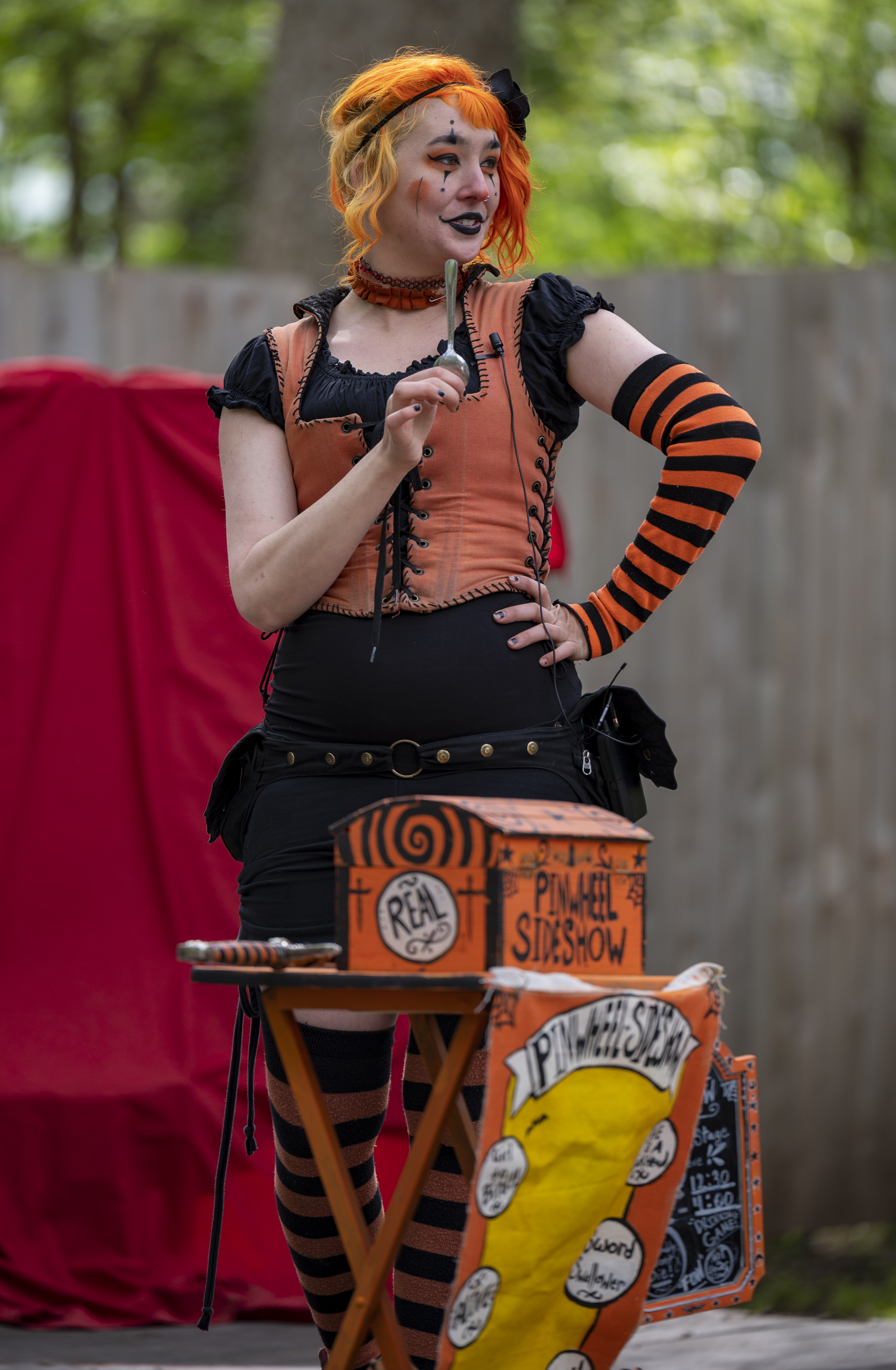
Pinwheel Sideshow 2021 Scarborough Renaissance Festival

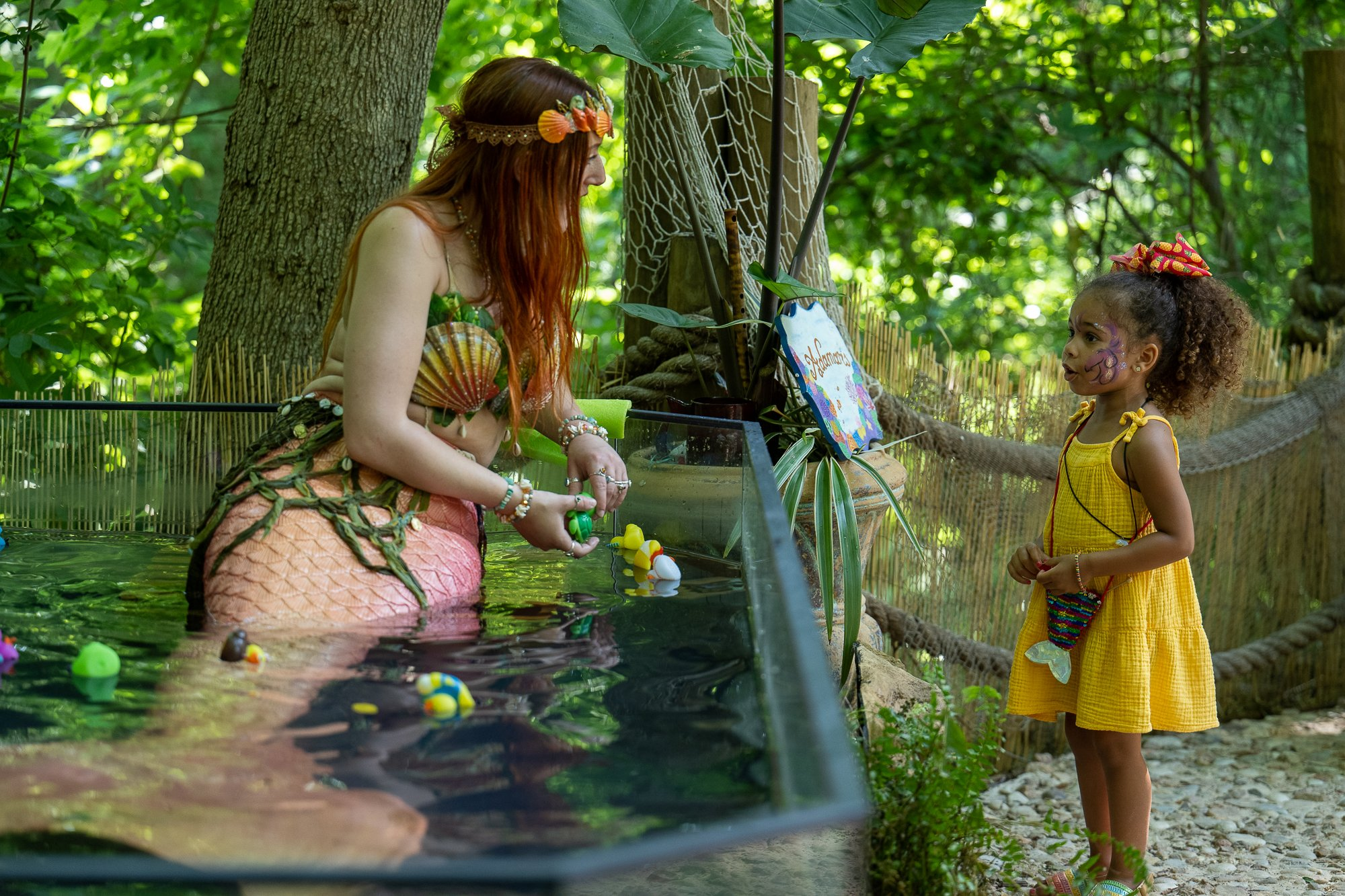
Unique Entertainment

== See also ==
- List of Renaissance fairs
- Historical reenactment
- Society for Creative Anachronism
- List of open air and living history museums in the United States
