= Challengers (role-playing game) =

Role-playing game

Challengers is a role-playing game published by Ragnarok Enterprises in 1985.

== Description ==
Challengers: Unique Superhero Adventuring is a superhero role-playing system based on a simplified version of the To Challenge Tomorrow rules. There are two books: one consisting of character and combat rules; the second describing a world where superheroes exist, important governmental organizations, sample characters, and six scenario suggestions.

== Publication history ==
Challengers was designed by David Nalle, and published by Ragnarok Enterprises in 1985 as a digest-sized box including a 40-page book and a 20-page book.

== Reviews ==
- Comics Feature #51
