= The End of a Legend =

Tabletop superhero role-playing game supplement

The... End... of... a... Legend...
- Designers: Paul Lidberg
- Publishers: 21st Century Games
- Publication: 1988; 37 years ago
- Genres: Superhero
- ISBN: 978-0944942031

The End of a Legend is an adventure published by 21st Century Games in 1988 for the super-hero science fiction role-playing game Enforcers.

== Plot summary ==
The End of a Legend is a scenario in which the player characters witness the assassination of a national hero, and subsequently investigate who is to blame.

== Publication history ==
The End of a Legend was written by Paul A. Lidberg and published by 21st Century Games in 1988 as a 32-page book.

== Reception ==
In the February 1989 edition of White Wolf (Issue #14), Stewart Wieck was disappointed in this adventure, pointing out that "Unfortunately, there is little detective work or thought that needs to be done by the players. The characters are essentially able to feed a few bits of info a computer and the computer then solves the problem (ie. locates the bad guy's base). The characters then rush to the base and beat up the bad guys." Because of this, Wieck gave the adventure a below-average rating of 2 out of 5, saying, "Basically, while the "Enforcers" game system is good, I cannot recommend this module."
