= Duel Magical =

Board game

Duel Magical is a 1982 board game published by Ragnarok Enterprises.

== Gameplay ==
Duel Magical is a game designed by Dave Nalle involving arena battles between mages.

== Reception ==
Ronald Pehr reviewed Duel Magical in The Space Gamer No. 51. Pehr commented that "Duel Magical is too abstract and simple to suit most gamers; repeated playings will tarnish the novelty. But it's rousing good entertainment, equally playable by novices or hardbitten wargaming veterans, is an excellent diversion, and has more of the flavor of a fantasy magic duel than any game I've played."

Bill Pixley reviewed Duel Magical for Pegasus magazine and stated that "The system is fast and easy to learn and play. It is a fun game which I would recommend playing. In fact, with a little modification, the system could be expanded into a spell point system for a regular role playing campaign."
