= Enforcer =

Enforcer or enforcers may refer to:

== Arts, entertainment and media ==
=== Comics ===
- Enforcer (comics), a Marvel Comics character
- Enforcers (comics), a Marvel Comics team
- New Enforcers, another Marvel Comics team
- Enforcer (DC Comics), various DC Comics characters sharing the same codename

=== Film and television ===
- The Enforcer (1951 film), a 1951 film starring Humphrey Bogart
- The Enforcer (1976 film), third 'Dirty Harry' film starring Clint Eastwood
- My Father Is a Hero (1995) or The Enforcer, a film starring Jet Li
- The Enforcer (2022 film), an American action thriller film
- Enforcers (SWAT Kats), Megakat city's paramilitary police force in the animated television series

=== Gaming ===
- X-COM: Enforcer (2001), a third-person shoot'em up game
- Enforcer, a boss in the game Coded Arms (2005)
- Enforcer, a special Sentinel who appears in Halo 2 (2004)
- PAX Enforcers, volunteer staff of the Penny Arcade Expo
- The Enforcer, the main character in the computer game MegaRace (1993)
- Enforcers (role-playing game), a 1987 role-playing game

=== Music ===
- Enforcer (band), a Swedish heavy metal band
- "CBS Enforcer", a bumper music package written by Frank Gari used by local CBS television stations

== Crime, law enforcement and military ==
- Enforcer (battering ram), a manual battering ram used by British Police forces
- Law enforcer, a person empowered by the state to enforce the law
- Mob enforcer, a member of a group, especially of a criminal gang, who performs contract killings or is charged with keeping dissident members obedient
- Enforcer, a shoulder-launched guided rocket weapon being developed by MBDA

== Sports ==
- Enforcer (ice hockey), a role in ice hockey
- Enforcer (professional wrestling), a wrestler who accompanies another to matches, and acts as a bodyguard
- Chicago Enforcers, a former American football team in the short-lived XFL
- The Enforcers, a wrestling team

== Transportation ==
- Enforcer (ship design), a naval vessel for carrying expeditionary forces
- MH-90 Enforcer, an armed helicopter
- Piper PA-48 Enforcer, an airplane based on the P-51 Mustang

== People ==
- Arn Anderson (born 1958), American professional wrestler, nicknamed "The Enforcer"
- Jack Cunningham, Baron Cunningham of Felling (born 1939), British politician, referred to as the "cabinet enforcer".
- Sophie Cunningham (born 1996), American basketball player nicknamed "The Enforcer"
- Maurice Lucas (1952–2010), American basketball player and later coach, also nicknamed "The Enforcer"

== Other uses ==
- Iver Johnson Enforcer, a cut down pistol configuration of the M1 carbine

== See also ==
- The Enforcers (disambiguation)
- Enforcement, the process of ensuring compliance with laws, regulations, rules, standards, or social norms
