= Dave Nalle =

American political writer (1959–2021)

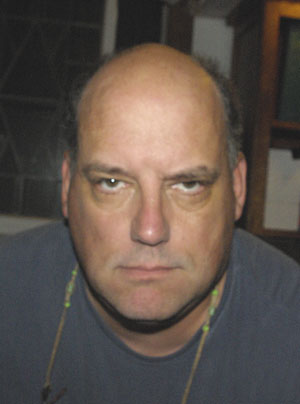
- Born: March 19, 1959; Beirut, Lebanon
- Died: February 13, 2021 (aged 61)
- Education: Franklin & Marshall College (BA); University of Texas (MA)
- Occupations: Journalist, editor, political activist, type designer, game designer
- Children: Caroline, Catherine
- Relatives: David Nalle, Karen Dotrice

David F. Nalle (March 19, 1959 – February 13, 2021) was an American political writer, game author and type designer. He was active in the early history of the development of the internet. Nalle was at one time Chairman of the Republican Liberty Caucus, a group that promotes libertarianism within the Republican Party, Senior Politics Editor at Blogcritics online magazine, and was the CEO of Scriptorium Fonts.

== Biography ==
Dave Nalle's parents were American diplomat David Nalle and Margaret Shumaker Nalle. Due to his father's diplomatic postings, Dave Nalle spent his formative years overseas in Syria, Iran, Jordan, England and the Soviet Union and traveled in the Middle East and Central Asia. During this time, he received his primary and middle school education from British and American schools. During his teens, the family lived in Washington, D.C., where he attended high school at St. Albans School.

After moving to Texas in 1982, Nalle earned two graduate degrees at the University of Texas and did a year of graduate study in England at the City University of London. During this period he also ran a small game publishing company called Ragnarok Press. In 1989, Nalle founded Scriptorium Fonts to market his original font designs and digital recreations of antique type and hand lettering, initially for the Commodore 64 and eventually primarily for Macintosh and Windows users.

Nalle ran for Texas State Representative in 2002, and served as Chairman of the Republican Liberty Caucus from 2009 to 2013. He was also ex-president of the Manor Lions Club and Chairman of the East Travis County Advisory Board which supervises a community center, a public library and charity programs in Manor, Texas. He had two daughters and resided outside of Austin, Texas.

== Writing and game design ==
Nalle was the author of articles published in Dragon and other gaming magazines, as well as game, media and book reviews, short fiction and poetry. He also had featured columns in Renaissance Magazine and Thrust: Science Fiction in Review.

His published game designs include the Ysgarth and To Challenge Tomorrow roleplaying games, the board game Duel Magical, game books and resources, and the Arthurian collectible card game Quest for the Grail. He was the editor and publisher of 51 issues of Abyss Magazine. Nalle also designed the Suburban Slasher strategy game (1992), which was one of the games that TSR banned from Gen Con in the 1990s due to content.

Nalle was the inspiration for a major villain in the tabletop RPG Ars Magica named Dav'Nalleous.

In 2003, Nalle was brought in as a guest designer for a radical redesign of Whole Earth magazine under the guest editorship of Viridian thinker Bruce Sterling.

== Internet and blogging ==
Nalle began his involvement with the internet in 1979 working for Al Gore at the Congressional Clearinghouse on the Future which sponsored the Congressional Chautauqua series that brought together legislators, academics and communications industry professionals and is credited as the starting point for the development of the public internet.

Nalle operated the Infinite Incarnations BBS which ran on the Hermes BBS package and operated until 1994.

He began writing a blog in 2002 during his campaign for State Representative in Texas House District 42. After the campaign he continued to write under a series of different blog names, eventually developing into the Republic of Dave weblog. In 2008, he started a second blog devoted to debunking conspiracy theories, political disinformation and urban legends at IdiotWars.com. It has a particular emphasis on countering the claims of radio talk show host Alex Jones.

He edited the Republican Liberty Caucus weblog and was a featured contributor to the Republican Leadership Council website.

== Political activities ==
Nalle returned to political activism after his unsuccessful run for State Representative in 2002, becoming involved with the Republican Liberty Caucus and eventually serving as Vice Chairman from 2007 to 2009 and Chairman (2009–2013). He also worked as an adviser and consultant on a number of campaigns in the 2008, 2010 and 2012 elections, specializing in new media campaigns and message framing. In 2011, he was an adviser to Texas Senatorial Candidate Ted Cruz, and as Texas State Director for the Gary Johnson presidential campaign. Nalle appeared in TV ads for the Ted Cruz in the U.S. Senate race in 2012. Towards the end of the 2012 election, Nalle joined Liberty Torch Political Consulting. He was the policy and messaging adviser for the firm. In 2012, he also became a member of the advisory board of the Coalition to Reduce Spending.

Nalle, as vice chairman of the Republican Liberty Caucus, initially endorsed Rand Paul in the 2016 U.S. Presidential election.

== Death ==
On February 11, 2021, Nalle's partner, Maggie Perkins, reported that Nalle had contracted COVID-19 and was critically ill. On February 14, 2021, Perkins posted on her Facebook page that Nalle had died the previous day.

American game designer Steve Jackson posted an obituary, remembering Nalle as "a game designer (Ysgarth), publisher (Ragnarok Press), font designer [...] and libertarian gadfly."

== Books and games ==
- Ysgarth (1979)
- To Challenge Tomorrow (1983)
- Triad (1984)
- London by Night (1984)
- Middle Passage (1985)
- Challengers (1985)
- Siege and Fortress (1987)
- Ysgarth Adventure Anthology (1987)
- By the Gods (1986)
- EsperAgents (1988)
- Complete Gamer's Pantheon (1988)
- Ysgarth Bestiary (1989)
- Character RolePlaying (1989)
- Quest for the Grail (1995)
- Oroborus (1998)
