= Middle Passage (board game) =

1983 board game of piracy and trade

- 1st edition rulebook cover
- Designers: Dave Nalle
- Publishers: Ragnarok Enterprises
- Publication: 1983
- Genres: Age of Sail

Middle Passage, subititled "The Game of War, Trade and Piracy in the Atlantic, 1680 to 1830", is a board game published by Ragnarok Enterprises in 1983 that simulates Atlantic trade and piracy during the Age of Sail.

== Gameplay ==
Middle Passage is a strategic board game for 2 to 6 players that simulates trade and naval conflict in the Atlantic during the late 17th to early 19th centuries. Players take on roles as merchants, naval commanders, or pirates, aiming to amass wealth through commerce, combat, or raids. The game allows players to build ships, trade goods, engage in battles, and maneuver across a network of ports and sea routes. Victory requires accumulating $600,000 in assets.

The game, packaged in a resealable plastic bag, includes a 12-page rulebook, a player and ship record sheet, two cardstock 8 1/2" x 11" mapsheets,and six sets of 16 cardstock ship markers.

== Publication history ==
Middle Passage was designed by Dave Nalle and published by Ragnarok Enterprises in 1983.

== Reception ==
In Issue 25 of Abyss, Eric Olson noticed a few "minor flaws" in the game and suggested some variant rules to fix those problems. Olson concluded, "Middle Passage has almost infinite possibilities, and can be played over and over again with different scenarios and variants, including many which you will probably think up on your own. Give Middle Passage a chance, you won't regret it."

In Issue 6 of Fantasy Gamer, Jerry Epperson commented "Middle Passage, despite floundering in a few places, will not collect dust on my game shelf. It is a great little game that can be played and expanded with little effort. For those of you who are looking for a highly competitive and fast-action game, your ship has come in."

In Issue 73 of The Space Gamer, Epperson compared Middle Passage to another Ragnarok game, Passage to Cathay, and found a similar problem in both games: "During one game [of Passage to Cathay], all of the players except one decided to become pirates. They took turns sacking port after port until a winner was determined (the merchant, though he played great, finished dead last, the victim of attrition). This is the same problem that Middle Passage has: Pirating is much too profitable."
