= Ysgarth =

Fantasy role-playing game

- The six books of the third edition plus red folder cover sheet
- Designers: Dave Nalle
- Publishers: Ragnarok Games
- Publication: 1979 (1st edition); 1992 (6th edition)
- Genres: Fantasy
- Systems: Custom

Ysgarth is a fantasy role-playing game published in 1979 by Ragnarok Enterprises. Several editions were subsequently published over the next twenty-five years.

== Description ==
Ysgarth is a rules-heavy role-playing game — game historian Lawrence Schick called it "complex and detailed.". A player creates a character by distributing a pool of points to twelve primary attributes. These then determine almost twenty secondary characteristics by means of various formulae. For example, Attack Rating is derived from [(2 x Intelligence) + {2 x Dexterity) + Strength + Agility - Size Class]/10. Skills for the character are purchased from a very long list, and there is no limit to the number of Skills that a character can possess. Old skills can modify the cost of new skills, as can the character's social and cultural background. For example, characters from Kernwyk have a bonus to Tinsmithing and Net Fishing.

Combat involves allocating a pool of Action Points to various actions. To attack an enemy, the player chooses a target area, rolls percentile dice, adds the character's Attack Rating, and subtracts the enemy's Defense Rating and other modifiers, then checks a chart to see if the chosen target body part was successfully hit. Once the appropriate number of Action Points for the attack have been paid, damage can be calculated if the hit was successful.

Character who do something especially good gain Kharma Points, while bad deeds result in Dharma Points. Fame is tracked by Renown Points. Characters can also receive Deity Influence Points to indicate how much influence the character has with their patron deity.

There are six books included in the third edition:

1. "The Fantasy Character": Character creation
2. "Battlecraft": Combat system
3. "The Arcane Arts": Magic system
4. "Holy Orders": Clerics and their gods
5. "The Fantasy World": Designing world and campaigns
6. "The Last Song of Hergest": An introductory adventure scenario

== Publication history ==
Ysgarth was designed by Dave Nalle and published by Ragnarok Enterprises in 1979 as three digest-sized books (56 pages total). The second edition was published in 1980 as a 100-page digest-sized book. The third edition was published in 1982 as a digest-sized box with a red cover, including six books (120 pages total). The fourth edition (1982) was published in the same format as the third edition but with a blue cover. The fifth edition was published in 1985 as a digest-sized box, including three books: "RoleCraft" (36 pages), "SpellCraft" (24 pages), and "WorldCraft" (24 pages).

Many supplements and adventure modules were published over the course of about a dozen years when the game was particularly active, as well as games in other genres using mechanics derived from Ysgarth.

These include:

- Kahldath: The Messiah (1980)
- The Maghrib (1980)
- The Ring of Gilrod (1981)
- Uchelglan - The Blood Tribute (1981)
- Ynisare: The Lost Colony (1981)
- Baelnok - Holy City of Arberth (1982)
- Drink the Wine of the Moon (1982)
- The Fair at Tezkorel (1982)
- Player and GM Record Sheets (1982)
- Creatures Fair & Fell (1983)
- Ravensgate (1983)
- Cynfelyn: Prince of Prydein (1984)
- Expanding Worlds (1984)
- Hills of Binazmia (1984)
- The Old Powers (1984)
- Street Shadows (1984)
- Rolecraft, Ysgarth System Book One (1985)
- Spellcraft, Ysgarth System Book Two (1985)
- Black Altars (1986)
- Challenge of the Toymaker (1986)
- Rivermasters of Arania (1987)

== Reception ==
C. D. Martin reviewed The Ysgarth Rule System for Different Worlds magazine and stated that "From RuneQuest through DragonQuest to Worlds of Wonder, the trend has been towards simplicity. Publishers have to produce simple games if they are going to lure players away from established RPGs. People don't want to spend hours learning a new game. Ysgarth defies this trend. If you prefer immersing yourself in a long, detailed game to playing many games, Ysgarth may indeed be a good buy. At least, the price is right."

In Issue 58 of The Space Gamer December 1982), Lewis Pulsipher reviewed the second revised edition (orange cover) of Ysgarth Rules System and commented that "This is the closest I've seen to a simulation FRPG, and there's plenty of potential for additions to other systems, if you prefer [...] YRS is one of the FRP bargains of this or any year."

In Issue 16 of Sorcerer's Apprentice, Michael Stackpole thought that "While the mechanics of this system seem a tad more complex than they need to be, the imagination and detail put into the world designed for the game are worth taking a few notes from." Stackpole noted that the product was typed rather than typeset, but concluded, "Despite the lack of high-quality production, [it] contains many good ideas, and it is a source of inspiration that gamers should find interesting and useful."

In Issue 83 of The Space Gamer October–November 1983), Rick Swan commented that "As an integrated, self-contained fantasy system, Ysgarth more closely resembles Runequest than Dungeons and Dragons, but page for page is much tougher to digest than either one. It's a remarkable game, recommended for advanced players with dependable calculators and a lot of patience."

Swan reviewed the game again in his 1990 book The Complete Guide to Role-Playing Games, writing, "Ysgarth may not be the 'revolution in role-playing' as claimed on the cover, but it's certainly one of the hobby's best kept secrets." But Swan warned, "Ysgarth is not a game for beginners in any sense — even experienced players will have their hands full with rules as dense as these — but the diligent will be rewarded with a tremendously satisfying game." Swan concluded by giving this game a solid rating of 3 out of 4.

Brennan O'Brien reviewed Ysgarth Advanced Roleplaying, 6th Edition in White Wolf #45 (July, 1994), rating it a 2 out of 5 and stated that "Despite my concerns, there's a certain charm to this game that harkens back to roleplaying's 'days of innocence.' I recommend it to anyone seeking something different in FRPGs (but you have to do some work) and to those looking for source material for other games. If you don't fit either bill, Ysgarth isn't worth your money."

== Reviews ==
- Analog Science Fiction and Fact
