= Victorian Adventure =

Victorian-era tabletop role-playing game

Box cover of second edition, 1985

Victorian Adventure is a Victorian-era role-playing game published by SKS Distribution (U.K.) in 1983.

== Description ==
Victorian Adventure is a historical mystery/adventure system set in 19th-century England, during the height of the British Empire. The main object of the game is to better yourself and make money. The character and skill rules are simple, with the background and social systems covering such things as social class and status, spiritualism, history, background, prominent events, prices, clothes, and inventions of the period. The game includes three scenarios.

The second edition greatly expands the rules and adds two new scenarios.

== Publication history ==
Victorian Adventure was designed by Stephen Smith, and published by SKS Distribution in 1983 as a 50-page book. The second edition was published in 1985 as a boxed set containing a greatly expanded rulebook, a map, and cardstock miniatures.

== Reception ==
In Issue 6 of Fantasy Gamer, William A. Barton liked the game, writing, "As an aficionado of Victorian times, I found Victorian Adventure quite intriguing, It is fast and easy to play; characters are created simply and quickly." Barton did question the lack of a city map, writing, "The only flaw I can find in Victorian Adventure, other than some rough spots in editing, is that there is no map of London in Victorian days for use by players unfamiliar with the city." However, Barton, an American, admitted that the game "was designed primarily for British gamers, who would have a greater knowledge of such background info than we 'colonials.'" Barton concluded with a recommendation for his American readers, saying, "If the Victorian era holds any interest for you in terms of roleplaying, and you don't mind having to convert your dollars to British pounds and sending to England to obtain a copy, I think you'll find much of interest in Victorian Adventure."

In the June 1984 edition of Imagine (Issue 15), Chris Hunter was not impressed by the game, saying, "the poor artwork and the occasional low standard of English do not help a set of rules which in their present state I would not recommend."

In Issue 37 of Abyss, Jon Schuller called the art "awful" but found the overall layout "very straightforward" and "the type is pleasingly readable." Schuller thought the rules had been copied from an old version of Runequest, and did not like the simplified combat system, pointing out there were no defensive strategies, and "specialized skills play no role in combat, with your ability based entirely on experience and statistics." Schuller thought the game needed more work, commenting, "Victorian Adventure seems like a good idea which has been executed with only a limited amount of effort. The mechanics are highly derivative and rather primitive with far too great a reliance on random rolls, and there needs to be a great deal more background development and perhaps another scenario or two." Schuller concluded, "The game is simple and has some interesting ideas, but there is just not enough here to support a lasting campaign."

In the January 1990 edition of Games International (Issue 12), Kevin Jacklin was disappointed by this game, saying, "it does little to further the 'art of detection' in the Victorian (or indeed any other) era." Although Jacklin found the three scenarios of varying quality, he concluded, "The real problems with the game are the virtually incomprehensible character generation rules and game mechanics."

In the 1991 book Heroic Worlds: A History and Guide to Role-Playing Games, Lawrence Schick felt that "the main strength of the game is its strong background and social systems".
