= Quest for the Grail =

Board game

- Card back to the Quest for the Grail CCG
- Publishers: Horizon Games / Stone Ring
- Players: 2 or more
- Setup time: < 5 minutes
- Playing time: < 60 minutes

Quest for the Grail is an out-of-print collectible card game (CCG) by Horizon Games and Stone Ring in 1995.

== Publication history ==
The game was released in with two editions:

- the Preview Edition, which consisted of 126 cards;
- and the Limited Edition that was released in December 1995 and consisted of 280 cards.

An expansion set named Knights of the Isle, based on Scottish and Irish elements, was scheduled for release in April 1996. Delayed, the 135-card set was then planned for release in October 1996 in 14-card booster packs each containing 2 rare cards.

== Gameplay ==
This CCG is based on Arthurian legend, with elements of Monty Python (although it preceded the Monty Python and the Holy Grail CCG released in June 1996.)

Each player divides their cards into two decks:

- The Court deck contains Kings, Knights, Rewards, Events, Domains, and Companions.
- The Quest Deck has missions and encounters

To complete a quest, each player deploys Knights and Kings to search for equipment and spells that will aid in the quest. Successful completion of a Quest earns Valor points. Any knight or King who earn 12 or more Valor may attempt to find the Grail by completing three Quests in the same turn, winning the game.

== Reception ==
In the December 1995 edition of Arcane (Issue 1), Lucya Szachnowski was generally positive about the game, saying, "This game brims with atmosphere. It has a simple yet satisfying system and lends itself well to storytelling and roleplaying the characters, if you feel like it." Szachnowski concluded by giving it an above average rating of 8 out of 10.

The reviewer for Pyramid #19 (May/June, 1996) said that "it is not just another spin-off-run-of-the-mill-crank-it-out collectible card game. This game has soul and a fresh, distinctive feel that many will find refreshing in a bar code industry."

In the July 1996 edition of Dragon (Issue 231), Rick Swan called this game "a stylish take on the legend of King Arthur". He liked the production values, noting the "smart text and exquisite artwork". He also enjoyed the more cerebral approach the game takes: "Notably, Quest for the Grail stresses problem-solving over combat, a refreshing change from the smack-‘em-in-the-head approach taken by virtually every other card game on the market." Swan did concede that the game "requires an annoying number of die-rolls", and also noted that the cardstock used was thinner than most other CCGs. But he concluded that "Quest is a keeper."

== Reviews ==
- The Duelist #11
