= Renaissance Magazine =

American magazine about renaissance related topics

- Editor: Adam Eyler & Tanya Laird
- Frequency: Bi-monthly
- Circulation: 35,000
- Founded: 1996
- Company: Lionheart Entertainment LLC
- Country: United States
- Based in: Bridgeport, Connecticut
- Language: English
- ISSN: 1088-906X

Renaissance Magazine was a glossy American magazine published bimonthly. Each issue comprised approximately 90 pages, and included articles about the contemporary renaissance faire experience, medieval and renaissance history, castles, heraldry, cooking, and interviews with key individuals in the renaissance fair industry. It was founded in 1996 by Kim Guarnaccia, aka Lady Kimberly, a graduate of Yale University, headquartered in Nantucket, MA. She sold the magazine to Queue, Inc. of Shelton, CT in 2000, but remained as art director and editor-in-chief until 2007. The magazine was then purchased by Lionheart Entertainment LLC in Houston, Texas in 2017 and was finally closed in January 2020.
