= To Challenge Tomorrow =

Multi-genre role-playing game

To Challenge Tomorrow is a multi-genre role-playing game published by Ragnarok Enterprises in 1983 that can be adapted to any setting or time period. Reviews were mixed, with some reviewers saying there were some good concepts, while others found too many issues with the rules.

== Description ==
To Challenge Tomorrow is a universal system for historical, contemporary, or future settings. The rules are general, using a skill-based system, with skill scores heavily modified by a character's basic statistics. Character generation is done by distributing a pool of points between four main attributes, which then generates a number of secondary characteristics. Players complete the character by adding a number of skills from a long list.

The boxed set consists of three books:

- "Past, Present & Future SF & Historical Rules" (32 pages), with rules for character creation, skills, psychic skills, and combat;
- "Worlds of Adventure" (32 pages), which describes twelve time periods, from the 15th to the 30th century;

"Adventures" (20 pages), which includes four miniscenarios.

== Publication history ==
To Challenge Tomorrow was designed by Dave Nalle, and published by Ragnarok Enterprises in 1983 as a digest-sized box containing three booklets and a sample character sheet.

Ragnarok also published a number of supplements:

- Worlds of Adventure (1983): Generic setting material for a science-fiction setting.
- Triad: Expansion One (1984): Far-future setting material and three scenarios.
- London by Night: Adventure in a Victorian City (1984): Historical and geographical information about Victorian London, literary sources that can be used by the gamamster, and four scenarios involving politics, the occult and investigations.

Over the next ten years, Ragnarok published four editions of To Challenge Tomorrow.

== Reception ==
In the Special Edition #2 of Ares (1983), Jerry Epperson commented that "It is best suited to those who are looking for a simple, realistic, and quick RPG system that can expand to the limits of the imagination. It will be a tough act to follow."

In the January–February 1985 edition of Space Gamer (No. 72), William Barton commented that "if you can look beyond its production limitations, I think you'll find To Challenge Tomorrow a worthwhile purchase, even if for nothing else than several good gaming concepts.".

In the January–February 1985 edition of Different Worlds (Issue #38), Matt Stevens outlined issues with several parts of the rules, commenting, ""The basic rules are probably the most important section of all, so it is pretty hard for me to recommend a game when the rules are terrible." Stevens concluded by giving it a below-average rating of 1.5 stars out of 4, saying, "While it seems that a lot of effort was put into this game, and while it does have a lot of original features, I can't really recommend it. It's unfortunate because I think this could have really worked."

In his 1990 book The Complete Guide to Role-Playing Games, game critic Rick Swan called this "a fairly successful example of a generic game." Swan thought designer Dave Nalle had been "perhaps a little too ambitious ... [but] it's a nice effort, with some good ideas and a lot of potential." Swan found the four included scenarios "underdeveloped and graphically weak (the maps, for instance, are tough to read) — problems that plague the entire project." Swan concluded by giving the game a rating of 2.5 out of 4, saying the game "boasts attractively simple rules, an admirable amount of research, and one of the best skill systems I've ever seen. But it suffers from inadequate packaging and too many ideas crammed into too little space."
