= Assassin (disambiguation) =

An assassin is a person who commits assassination.

The origin of the term is the medieval Order of Assassins, a secretive Nizari Ismaili religious order that existed from around 1090–1275 CE and carried out high-profile assassinations during the crusader states period.

Assassin, or variants, may also refer to:

== Film and television ==
=== Film ===
- Assassin (1969 film), a South Korean thriller
- Assassin (1973 film), a British thriller
- Assassin, a 1986 TV movie starring Robert Conrad
- Assassin (2015 film), starring Danny Dyer
- Assassin (2023 film), starring Bruce Willis
- Assassins (1995 film), starring Sylvester Stallone and Antonio Banderas
- Assassins (2020 film), an American documentary
- Assassin(s), a 1997 French film
- The Assassin, British title for Gunfighters, a 1947 American film
- The Assassin, American title for Venetian Bird, a 1952 British film
- The Assassin (1961 film), an Italian crime drama
- The Assassin, a 1967 Shaw Brothers film
- The Assassin, or Point of No Return (1993 film)
- The Assassin (2015 film), a wuxia film
- The Assassin (2023 film), a South Korean historical action-drama
- The Assassins (film), a 2012 Chinese film
- The Assassin(s), a 2026 South Korean crime political thriller film

=== Television ===
- The Assassin (TV series), 2025
- "Assassin" (Law & Order: Criminal Intent)
- "Assassin" (Star Wars: The Clone Wars)
- "Assassin", a 1981 episode of Blake's 7
- "Assassins" (The Crown)
- "Assassins" (Desperate Housewives)
- "The Assassin" (The Borgias), a 2011 episode
- "The Assassin", an episode of MacGyver (1985 TV series)

== Gaming ==
- Assassin (video game), 1992
- The Assassin (cancelled video game)
- Assassin (Villains and Vigilantes), a 1985 adventure for the game Villains and Vigilantes
- Assassin (game), a live-action game
- Assassin!, a The Way of the Tiger gamebook

== Literature ==
- Assassin (Cain novel), by Tom Cain, 2008
- Assassins (LaHaye novel), by Jerry B. Jenkins and Tim Lahaye, 1999
- "L'Assassin", an 1887 short story by Guy de Maupassant
- The Assassini, a 1990 novel by Thomas Gifford
- The Assassins, a 1972 novel by Elia Kazan
- The Assassins, a 2005 novel by Oliver North and Joe Musser
- The Assassins: A Radical Sect in Islam, a 1967 non-fiction book by Bernard Lewis
- Krondor: The Assassins, a 1999 novel by Raymond E. Feist

== Music ==
=== Groups ===
- Assassin (band), an American heavy metal band
- Assassin (German band), a German thrash metal band
- Assassin (deejay) (born 1982), Jamaican dancehall deejay
- Assassin (group), a French hardcore rap group

=== Albums ===
- Assassin (album), by Assassin, 1984
- Assassins, by Into a Circle, 1984
- Assassins: Black Meddle, Part I, by Nachtmystium, 2008
- I, Assassin, by Gary Numan, 1982
- The Assassin (album), by Big Ed, 1998

=== Songs ===
- "Assassin" (The Orb song), 1992
- "Assassin", by John Mayer from the 2009 album Battle Studies
- "Assassin", by Morbid Saint from the 1989 album Spectrum of Death
- "Assassin", by Motörhead from the 1998 album Snake Bite Love
- "Assassin", by Muse from the 2006 album Black Holes and Revelations
- "Assassing", by Marillion from the 1994 album Fugazi
- "Assassins", by Lightning Bolt from the 2003 album Wonderful Rainbow
- "Assassins", by The Insane Clown Posse from the 1999 album The Amazing Jeckel Brothers
- "The Assassin", by Iron Maiden from the 1990 album No Prayer for the Dying

== Sport ==
- Assassin (horse) (1779 – c. 1794), Thoroughbred racehorse that won the 1782 Epsom Derby
- The Assassin, a nickname for former American football defensive back Jack Tatum
- The Assassin, a nickname for streetball player Brandon Durham
- The Assassin, a ring name of professional wrestler Jody Hamilton
- Assassins (professional wrestling), a wrestling tag team

== Other uses ==
- Assassins (musical), 1990, music and lyrics by Stephen Sondheim
- The Assassin (play), by Irwin Shaw, 1945
- Assassin, a 2005 tour and comedy album by Margaret Cho

== See also ==
- Assassination (disambiguation)
- List of assassinations
- Assassin bugs, a genus in the family Reduviidae
- Assassin spiders, a genus in the family Archaeidae
- All Sky Automated Survey for SuperNovae (ASAS-SN)
