= Live Armageddon =

Video by Krisiun
- Released: 21 February 2006
- Recorded: 13 April 2004 at Metalmania
- Genre: Death metal
- Length: 110:00
- Label: Century Media
- Producer: Tommy Dziubiński

Live Armageddon is the first live performance on DVD by Brazilian death metal band Krisiun, released in 2006 through Century Media. It was released simultaneously with their sixth studio album, AssassiNation. The DVD, which is nearly two hours in length, contains as its main feature, a performance recorded in Polish Metalmania festival in 2004. As a bonus, the DVD features 45 minutes of a show recorded in 2004 in São Paulo, that included bands such as Ratos de Porão e Korzus. The video also has two songs recorded in an amateur way at Wacken Open Air festival in 2001, footage from the Works of Carnage recording sessions, and the music video of "Murderer".

== Track listing ==
Metalmania 2004

1. "Hatred Inherit"
2. "Thorns of Heaven"
3. "Dawn of Flagellation"
4. "Murderer"
5. "Ethereal World"
6. "Vengeance's Revelation"
7. "Wolfen Tyranny"
8. "Conquerors of Armageddon"
9. "Kings of Killing"

Live in São Paulo 2004

1. "Dawn of Flagellation"
2. "Murderer"
3. "Ethereal World"
4. "Soul Devourer"
5. "Vengeance's Revelation"
6. "Ageless Venomous"
7. "Drum Solo"
8. "Wolfen Tyranny"
9. "Conquerors of Armageddon"
10. "In League with Satan"
11. "Works of Carnage"
12. "Apocalyptic Victory"

Bootlegged at Wacken 2001

1. "Conquerors of Armageddon"
2. "Drum Solo"
3. "Vengeance's Revelation"

== Personnel ==
Performers

- Alex Camargo – bass, vocals
- Moyses Kolesne – guitar
- Max Kolesne – drums

Production

- Piotr Wolański – vision mix
- Artur Wojewoda – vision edit
- Waldemar Szwajda – vision edit
- Piotr Brzeziński – sound recording, sound mix
  - Robert Nowak – assistant
- Marcin Pietuch – stage design
- Jarosław Kaczmarek – stage manager
- Grzegorz Styŀa – TV producer
- Edward Gryszczyk – TV manager
  - Natalia Mrózek – assistant
  - Marcin Lesiecki – assistant
- Tomasz Dziubiński – executive producer
  - Justyna Szarkowska – assistant
