= Assassination (disambiguation) =

Assassination is the killing of a prominent person, either for political or religious reasons or for payment.

Assassination may also refer to:

- Assassination (1927 film), a silent German film directed by Richard Oswald
- Assassination (1964 film), a 1964 Japanese film directed by Masahiro Shinoda
- Assassination (1967 film), a 1967 Italian thriller-spy film
- The Assassination (film), a 1972 French film starring Jean-Louis Trintignant
- Assassination (1987 film), a 1987 American film starring Charles Bronson
- AssassiNation, a 2006 album by death metal band Krisiun
- Assassination (2015 film), a 2015 South Korean film directed by Choi Dong-hoon

== See also ==
- Assassin (disambiguation)
- Executive Action
