= The Assassini =

1990 thriller novel by Thomas Gifford

- First edition cover
- Author: Thomas Gifford
- Language: English
- Genre: Thriller
- Publisher: Bantam Books
- Publication date: August 1990
- Publication place: United States
- Media type: Print (Hardback and paperback)
- Pages: 600 (First edition, hardback)
- ISBN: 0-553-05728-6
- OCLC: 20993214
- Dewey Decimal: 813/.54 20
- LC Class: PS3557.I284 A87 1990

The Assassini is a 1990 thriller novel by American author Thomas Gifford, published by Bantam Books.

== Plot summary ==
Set in 1982, while the Roman Catholic Church is preparing to elect a successor to the dying pope, Callistus IV, the book describes the attempts of lawyer Ben Driskill to solve the murder of his sibling, Sister Valentine, a nun who was an outspoken activist and a thorn in the Church's side. Driskill's world-spanning investigation leads him to the discovery of a document from a forgotten monastery in Ireland, which proves the existence of the Assassini, an age-old brotherhood of killers, once hired by princes of the Church to protect it in dangerous times; and the person who now controls them in his Machiavelli bid for power.

== Inspiration and influences ==
The novel was inspired by, and wove together in its dramatic structure, numerous historical controversies about the Roman Catholic Church:

- Constantine I and Christianity;
- Constantine I and the bishops of Rome;
- The legacy of the House of Borgia and their corrupt rule of the papacy during the Renaissance;
- Pope Pius IX and the claim that the First Vatican Council and the papal infallibility were to dogmatize papal temporal power;
- The Sodalitium Pianum;
- The emergence of Catholic clerical fascism in Europe;
- Pope Pius XI and his negotiation of the Lateran Treaty with Fascist Italy and the Reichskonkordat with Nazi Germany;
- The art theft and other items stolen as a result of the organized spoliation of European countries by agents of Nazi Germany;
- The involvement of Vatican officials and Catholic priests in ODESSA "ratlines", systems of escape routes for Nazis and other fascists fleeing Europe at the end of World War II;
- The Pope John Paul I conspiracy theories;
- The Banco Ambrosiano scandal of the Vatican Bank;

The persecution of Christians in the Roman Empire, Pope Callixtus I, his conflict with Hippolytus of Rome, his eventual martyrdom, Pope John XXIII and the Second Vatican Council are also briefly mentioned.

== Similarities ==
The Assassini (Italian for "assassins"), as an archetype for a lone priest or a secret society of priests involved in the sanctioned killing of (non-supernatural) political opponents of the Roman Catholic Church or a faction within the Church, can be found in several works of fiction.

- The Judas Testament, a 1994 novel by Daniel Easterman.
- The 2003 novel The Da Vinci Code by Dan Brown depicts a fictional member of the Catholic organisation Opus Dei as an assassini-like figure who targets people associated with the Priory of Sion. The book's 2000 prequel, Angels & Demons, mentions the historical Assassins by name.
