= Black Force Domain =

Studio album by Krisiun
- Released: 14 August 1995
- Genre: Death metal
- Length: 41:29
- Label: Dynamo Records

Krisiun chronology
| Black Force Domain (1995) | Apocalyptic Revelation (1998) |

Black Force Domain is the debut album by Brazilian death metal band Krisiun.

== Track listing ==
| No. | Title | Length |
|---|---|---|
| 1. | "Black Force Domain" | 5:22 |
| 2. | "Messiah of the Double Cross" | 5:04 |
| 3. | "Hunter of Souls" | 4:06 |
| 4. | "Blind Possession" | 3:48 |
| 5. | "Evil Mastermind" | 4:22 |
| 6. | "Infamous Glory" | 2:08 |
| 7. | "Rejected to Perish Below" | 4:47 |
| 8. | "Meanest Evil" | 4:24 |
| 9. | "Obsession by Evil Force" | 3:45 |
| 10. | "Sacrifice of the Unborn" | 4:02 |
| Total length: | | 41:29 |

Reissue bonus tracks
| No. | Title | Length |
|---|---|---|
| 11. | "Nuclear Winter" (Sodom cover) | 5:31 |
| 12. | "Total Death" (Kreator cover) | 3:14 |
| Total length: | | 50:14 |

== Credits ==
- Alex Camargo – bass, vocals
- Moyses Kolesne – guitars
- Max Kolesne – drums
