= The Great Execution =

Studio album by Krisiun
- Released: 31 October 2011
- Recorded: Recorded, mixed and mastered at Stage One Studios, 2011
- Genre: Death metal
- Length: 61:57
- Label: Century Media
- Producer: Andy Classen and Krisiun

Krisiun chronology
| Southern Storm (2008) | The Great Execution (2011) | Forged in Fury (2015) |

Professional ratings
Review scores
| Source | Rating |
|---|---|
| Metal Storm | 7.5/10 stars |
| Blabbermouth.net | 8.5/10 stars |
| About.com | 4.5/5 stars |
| The Metal Forge | 8/10 stars |
| AllMusic | 3.5/5 stars |

The Great Execution is the eighth studio album by Brazilian death metal band Krisiun. It was released on 31 October 2011 by Century Media Records and produced by Andy Classen. The album was made available as a digital download, CD and vinyl format, including a limited edition transparent red edition. A limited-edition version of the album contains a re-recording of the track "Black Force Domain". A music video for "The Will To Potency" was released on 13 December 2012. A music video for "Blood of Lions" was released on 16 October 2014.

== Track listing ==
All lyrics are written by Krisiun, except lyrics on "Extincão em Massa", by João Gordo; all music is composed by Krisiun

Standard edition
| No. | Title | Length |
|---|---|---|
| 1. | "The Will to Potency" | 6:23 |
| 2. | "Blood of Lions" | 5:06 |
| 3. | "The Great Execution" | 5:18 |
| 4. | "Descending Abomination" | 5:45 |
| 5. | "The Extremist" | 5:57 |
| 6. | "The Sword of Orion" | 7:59 |
| 7. | "Violentia Gladiatore" | 5:37 |
| 8. | "Rise and Confront" | 5:13 |
| 9. | "Extinção em Massa" (Mass Extinction - feat. João Gordo) | 6:01 |
| 10. | "Shadows of Betrayal" | 8:38 |
| Total length: | | 01:01:57 |

Limited edition tonus track
| No. | Title | Length |
|---|---|---|
| 11. | "Black Force Domain (re-recording)" | 5:03 |
| Total length: | | 01:07:00 |

== Personnel ==
All information is derived from the enclosed booklet.

Krisiun

- Alex Camargo – bass, vocals
- Moyses Kolesne – guitar
- Max Kolesne – drums

Additional musicians

- Marcello Caminha – acoustic guitar on "The Will to Potency" (Intro) and "The Sword of Orion" (Outro)
- João Gordo – vocals on "Extincão em Massa"

Production and artwork

- Andy Classen – production, recording, mixing, and mastering
- Toshihiro Egawa – artwork
- Krisiun – production
