= Apocalyptic Revelation =

Studio album by Krisiun
- Released: 27 October 1998
- Studio: Da Tribo Studios
- Genre: Death metal
- Length: 39:01
- Label: GUN
- Producers: Krisiun, Simon Fuhrmann

Krisiun chronology
Black Force Domain (1995)	Apocalyptic Revelation (1998)	Conquerors of Armageddon (2000)

Professional ratings
Review scores
Source	Rating
Scream Magazine	5/6

Apocalyptic Revelation is the second album by Brazilian death metal band Krisiun.

== Track listing ==
No.	Title	Length
1.	"Creation's Scourge"	5:04
2.	"Kings of Killing"	4:24
3.	"Apocalyptic Victory"	5:28
4.	"Aborticide (In the Crypts of Holiness)"	4:08
5.	"March of the Black Hordes"	4:48
6.	"Vengeance's Revelation"	4:39
7.	"Rites of Defamation"	4:25
8.	"Meaning of Terror"	2:07
9.	"Rises from Black"	3:54
Total length:		39:01

== Credits ==
- Moyses Kolesne – guitars
- Max Kolesne – drums
- Alex Camargo – bass, vocals
