= Southern Storm =

Studio album by Krisiun
- Released: July 21, 2008
- Recorded: Stage One Studios in Borgentreich, Germany
- Genre: Death metal
- Length: 50:25
- Label: Century Media
- Producer: Andy Classen

Krisiun chronology
| AssassiNation (2006) | Southern Storm (2008) | The Great Execution (2011) |

Professional ratings
Review scores
| Source | Rating |
|---|---|
| About.com | 4/5 stars |
| AllMusic | 3.5/5 stars |
| Blabbermouth.net | 9/10 stars |
| Chronicles of Chaos | 9/10 |
| Pitchfork Media | 7.2/10 |

Southern Storm is the seventh studio album by Brazilian death metal band Krisiun. The album was recorded at Stage One Studios in Borgentreich, Germany, with producer Andy Classen. It was released in Europe on 21 July 2008, and in the United States on 5 August 2008, through Century Media Records. The album features a cover of the Sepultura song "Refuse/Resist".

== Track listing ==
| No. | Title | Length |
|---|---|---|
| 1. | "Slaying Steel" | 4:11 |
| 2. | "Sentenced Morning" | 3:59 |
| 3. | "Twisting Sights" | 4:06 |
| 4. | "Minotaur" | 3:51 |
| 5. | "Combustion Inferno" | 4:23 |
| 6. | "Massacre Under the Sun" | 4:43 |
| 7. | "Bleeding Offers" | 3:25 |
| 8. | "Refuse/Resist" (Sepultura cover) | 3:00 |
| 9. | "Origin of Terror" | 4:05 |
| 10. | "Contradictions of Decay" | 4:08 |
| 11. | "Sons of Pest" | 4:48 |
| 12. | "Black Wind" | 0:48 |
| 13. | "Whore of the Unlight" | 4:53 |
| Total length: | | 50:25 |

== Personnel ==
=== Krisiun ===
- Alex Camargo – bass, vocals
- Moyses Kolesne – guitar
- Max Kolesne – drums, percussion

=== Additional personnel ===
- Krisiun – arrangement
- Andy Classen – rhythm guitar, production, recording, engineering, mixing, mastering
- Josh Reuben Galeos – mixing
