= Dirty Tricks (film) =

- Theatrical release poster
- Directed by: Alvin Rakoff
- Written by: William W. Norton; Eleanor E. Norton; Thomas Gifford; Camille Gifford
- Produced by: Claude Héroux
- Starring: Elliott Gould; Kate Jackson; Rich Little; Arthur Hill; John Juliani; Alberta Watson
- Cinematography: Richard Ciupka
- Edited by: Alan Collins
- Music by: Hagood Hardy
- Production company: Filmplan International
- Distributed by: AVCO Embassy Pictures
- Release date: March 20, 1981 (Chicago)
- Running time: 95 minutes
- Country: United States
- Language: English
- Budget: $5 million

Dirty Tricks is a 1981 American comedy film directed by Alvin Rakoff and written by William W. Norton, Eleanor E. Norton, Thomas Gifford and Camille Gifford. The film stars Elliott Gould, Kate Jackson, Rich Little, Arthur Hill, John Juliani and Alberta Watson.

== Plot ==
A Harvard University student, attempts to contact Prof. Chandler, to authenticate a mysterious letter supposedly signed by George Washington. The student is murdered and the letter vanishes. Professor Chandler finds himself being hunted by a mafia killer and intrepid TV reporter Karen Polly Bishop.

== Cast ==
- Elliott Gould as Professor Chandler
- Kate Jackson as Karen Polly Bishop
- Rich Little as Robert Brennan
- Arthur Hill as Professor Prosser
- John Juliani as Roselli
- Alberta Watson as Tony
- Mavor Moore as Mr. Underhill
- Nicholas Campbell as Bill Darcy
- Michael McNamara as Thorn
- Martin McNamara as Ozzie
- Cindy Girling as Emily
- Michael Kirby as FBI Agent Wicklow
- Angus MacInnes as FBI Agent Jones
- Hugh Webster as Mr. Darcy
- Irene Kessler as Mrs. Cohen
- Earl Pennington as Taxi Driver
- Joyce Campion as Mrs. Greenshields
- Ken Umland as Cameraman
- Neil Affleck as Student #1
- Murray Cruchley as Anchorman
- George E. Zeeman as Fire Captain
- Lily Godfrey as Nurse
- Michael Harrouch as Patient
- Robert D. Koby as Doctor
- Anthony Sherwood as Soundman
- Lewis Pugh as Elderly Man
- Griffith Brewer as The Veteran
- Jeannette Tucker as Secretary
- Isabelle Hunting as Elderly Lady
- Lisa Bodie as Nurse
- Kate Trotter as Sally

== Production ==
Principal photography began on August 13, 1979, in Montreal and lasted about nine weeks; additional location shooting was done in Boston where the film was set. The film was made with the participation of the Canadian Film Development Corporation.

== Release ==
Distributed by AVCO Embassy Pictures, the film began an initial test run in Chicago on March 20, 1981, followed by a wider release on May 1 of that year.

Budgeted at around 5 million dollars, the film barely lasted over a month in theaters after its May 1 release, taking a serious financial loss by making only $528,791 in total.

So, it at the very least, drew some to the cinema but critics' negative reviews and word of mouth shot down further revenue.

=== Home media ===
The film was released on VHS in the United States by Embassy Home Entertainment.

The film did make some of its money back by repeat showings on Home Box Office (HBO)in 1982 / 1983.

Afterwards, the film quietly slipped into distant memory, occasionally showing up on late night local TV or afternoons. Except for bootlegs, the film has never been on DVD.

== Reception ==
Larry Kart of the Chicago Tribune gave the film zero stars out of four and wrote that "the shoddiness of the product is beyond belief. Lines are blown left and right, cuts within scenes don't match, and the performances would be unacceptable in a home movie ... If you've ever wondered what it's like at the bottom of the barrel, this film will take you on a guided tour." Variety wrote, "Despite the efforts of a willing and able cast, 'Dirty Tricks' flounders as a would-be chase comedy, done in by lame writing and misjudged direction."

Kevin Thomas of the Los Angeles Times stated, "Elliott Gould is such fun and so full of sweet mischief in 'Dirty Tricks' (selected theaters) it's a shame that it wastes both him and an amusing premise ... There are lot of car chases ending in routinely spectacular crashes, lots of trite spoofing of the Mafia and the FBI and lots of bloody violence, all of which is scarcely amusing." Gary Arnold of The Washington Post called the film "so shabby that it almost makes 'Foul Play' look classy."

David Macfarlane of Maclean's wrote, "Dirty Tricks is crass, witless and boring. Its humor is invariably sexist, its violence gratuitous. The acting is abysmal, the screenplay atrocious, and the direction beyond the pale. Any film that is little more than a vehicle for Gould's just-got-out-of-bed-where's-the-coffee style is obviously in very big trouble."

Reviews found on Internet Movie Database range from outright hate to at least one positive review.
