= Scourge of the Enthroned =

Studio album by Krisiun
- Released: 7 September 2018
- Recorded: Stage One Studio (Bühne, Germany)
- Genre: Death metal
- Length: 38:07
- Label: Century Media
- Producer: Krisiun

Krisiun chronology
Forged in Fury (2015)	Scourge of the Enthroned (2018)	Mortem Solis (2022)

Scourge of the Enthroned is the tenth studio album by Brazilian death metal band Krisiun. It was released on 7 September 2018 by Century Media Records.

== Track listing ==
All tracks are written by Krisiun.

No.	Title	Length
1.	"Scourge of the Enthroned"	5:54
2.	"Demonic III"	5:01
3.	"Devouring Faith"	4:19
4.	"Slay the Prophet"	4:50
5.	"A Thousand Graves"	4:11
6.	"Electricide"	4:04
7.	"Abysmal Misery (Foretold Destiny)"	3:57
8.	"Whirlwind of Immortality"	5:51

== Reception ==
Professional ratings
Review scores
Source	Rating
Blabbermouth.net	8/10 stars
Loudersound	4/5 stars
Banger TV	3.5/4 stars
Whiplash.net	9/10 stars

The album was praised as a great "comeback" after the poorly reviewed Forged in Fury, as Jay Gorania from Blabbermouth.net said: "Their efforts continue to pay off as 'Scourge of the Enthroned' is a marked improvement from 2015's 'Forged in Fury'."

The album was also praised as a great comeback by Vicente Reckziegel from Whiplash.net, who stated: "'Scourge of the Enthroned' is a sensational album, rivalizing their classics 'Black Force Domain', 'Conquerors of Armageddon' and 'Southern Storm', and being far superior than its predecessor, 'Forged in Fury'."

After the release of the album, the band embarked on the "Slaying Steel Over Europe" tour, with the bands Gruesome and Vitriol on 32 shows.

The album was the band's first album to enter any charts ever, debuting on Belgium, Germany and Switzerland.

== Personnel ==
Krisiun

- Alex Camargo – bass, vocals
- Moyses Kolesne – guitar
- Max Kolesne – drums

Production and artwork

- Andy Classen – recording
- Eliran Kantor – artwork
- Krisiun – production
- Dirk Behlau – photography

== Charts ==
Chart (2018)	Peak position
Belgian Albums (Ultratop Flanders)	199
Belgian Albums (Ultratop Wallonia)	155
German Albums (Offizielle Top 100)	93
Swiss Albums (Schweizer Hitparade)	89
