= Conquerors of Armageddon =

Studio album by Krisiun
- Released: 7 March 2000
- Genre: Death metal
- Length: 41:37
- Label: Century Media

Krisiun chronology
Apocalyptic Revelation (1998)	Conquerors of Armageddon (2000)	Ageless Venomous (2001)

Conquerors of Armageddon is the third album by Brazilian death metal band Krisiun and their first under the Century Media label.

AllMusic described the album as "basically just a bigger and (arguably) better version of what you hear on their first two: Morbid Angel-influenced death metal that overflows with blasting drumbeats, guttural guitar/bass riffs, growled-out vocals, and completely over-the-top guitar solos."

== Track listing ==
No.	Title	Length
1.	"Intro / Ravager"	3:52
2.	"Abyssal Gates"	5:16
3.	"Soul Devourer"	3:19
4.	"Messiah's Abomination"	3:56
5.	"Cursed Scrolls"	3:59
6.	"Conquerors of Armageddon"	6:05
7.	"Hatred Inherit"	5:34
8.	"Iron Stakes"	4:34
9.	"Endless Madness Descends"	5:00
Total length:		41:37

== Personnel ==
- Moyses Kolesne – guitars
- Max Kolesne – drums
- Alex Camargo – bass, vocals
- Andy Classen – engineer/producer
- Erik Rutan – producer
- Joe Petagno – cover artwork
