= Ageless Venomous =

Studio album by Krisiun
- Released: 7 August 2001
- Recorded: March–April 2001 (Creative Studios, Brazil)
- Genre: Death metal
- Length: 42:56
- Label: Century Media
- Producer: Krisiun, Tchelo Martins

Krisiun chronology
Conquerors of Armageddon (2000)	Ageless Venomous (2001)	Works of Carnage (2003)

Professional ratings
Review scores
Source	Rating
AllMusic	2.5/5 stars
Kerrang!	4/5 stars

Ageless Venomous is the fourth album by Brazilian death metal band Krisiun. The album cover artwork was done by Joe Petagno, the same artist who created Motörhead's War-Pig logo.

== Track listing ==
- All songs written, composed and arranged by Krisiun

No.	Title	Length
1.	"Perpetuation"	6:21
2.	"Dawn of Flagellation"	3:48
3.	"Ageless Venomous"	4:52
4.	"Evil Gods Havoc"	4:10
5.	"Eyes of Eternal Scourge"	4:28
6.	"Saviour's Blood"	3:58
7.	"Serpents Spectres"	5:45
8.	"Ravenous Hordes"	2:57
9.	"Diableros"	1:35
10.	"Sepulchral Oath"	4:59
Total length:		42:56

== Personnel ==
- Alex Camargo – bass, vocals
- Moyses Kolesne – guitars; acoustic guitar in Diableros
- Max Kolesne – drums; percussion in Diableros

Production

- Produced by Krisiun and Tchelo Martins
- Engineered, mixed and mastered by Phillip Colodetti
- Joe Petagno – cover artwork
