= Bloodshed (album) =

Studio album by Krisiun
- Released: 18 October 2004
- Recorded: 1993–2004
- Genre: Death metal
- Length: 40:57
- Label: Century Media Records
- Producer: Ciero, Krisiun

Krisiun chronology
| Works of Carnage (2003) | Bloodshed (2004) | AssassiNation (2006) |

Professional ratings
Review scores
| Source | Rating |
|---|---|
| AllMusic | 4/5 stars |

Bloodshed is an album by Brazilian death metal band Krisiun. It includes half of the Unmerciful Order EP, as well as seven new tracks (including interludes). Though sometimes considered a compilation, or an EP, the band considers Bloodshed to be an album.

The album was released under the license of Scarecrow Records in 2004, and despite its length, it was wrongly marketed as an EP. Tracks 1–7 and 12 were recorded at Da Tribo Studios, produced by Krisiun and Ciero, and the songs 8–11 were taken from the Unmerciful Order EP released in 1993.

== Track listing ==
| No. | Title | Length |
|---|---|---|
| 1. | "Slain Fate" | 3:34 |
| 2. | "Ominous" | 3:46 |
| 3. | "Servant of Emptiness" | 3:24 |
| 4. | "Eons" | 1:56 |
| 5. | "Hateful Nature" | 3:12 |
| 6. | "Visions Beyond" | 3:24 |
| 7. | "Voodoo" | 2:14 |
| 8. | "They Call Me Death" | 3:06 |
| 9. | "Unmerciful Order" | 2:35 |
| 10. | "Crosses Toward Hell" | 2:52 |
| 11. | "Infected Core" | 3:49 |
| 12. | "Outro/MMIV" | 7:02 |
| Total length: | | 40:57 |

== Credits ==
- Moyses Kolesne – guitars
- Max Kolesne – drums
- Alex Camargo – bass, vocals
- David Torelli – cover artwork
