= Thomas Gifford =

American novelist

- Born: May 16, 1937
- Died: October 31, 2000 (aged 63); Dubuque, Iowa
- Occupation: Novelist
- Writing career
- Genres: Mystery, Thriller

Thomas Eugene Gifford (May 16, 1937 – October 31, 2000) was a best-selling American author of thriller novels. He was a graduate of Harvard University.

He gained international fame with the crime novel The Glendower Legacy and later with the Vatican thriller The Assassini. The books posited George Washington as a British spy and the Roman Catholic Church as a criminal organization. The Glendower Legacy was made into a movie in 1981 under the name Dirty Tricks.

Gifford also published under the names Dana Clarins, Lisa Drake and Thomas Maxwell.

He died of cholangiocarcinoma in his home in Dubuque, Iowa, on Halloween 2000.

== Biography and Bibliography ==
Won awards at Harvard for creative writing; worked at The Sun newspaper and The Guthrie; won Putnam's prize for best first novel (The Wind Chill Factor).

From Dubuque, Iowa, after graduating from college he moved to the Twin Cities, Minnesota, where he and his wife, Kari Sandven, had two children (Thomas Eaton, Rachel Claire). Divorced in 1969, he went on to marry Camille D'Ambrose, a local actress. They moved to Los Angeles for a few years, then returned to Orono, MN. Novels continued to flow from his fountain pen through the years. Gifford eventually moved to New York—a city he loved whose people were of infinite importance to him. In 1996, he turned his attention to renovating his childhood home in Dubuque, spending more time in Iowa than New York during his last years. He embraced the community of Dubuque, as they embraced their prodigal son. Featured in the Dubuque Telegraph Herald, Gifford recounted his every day occurrences, from learning the pleasure of getting a dog (Katie Maxwell, the Scottie) to peeves and pleasures of the town. Diagnosed with terminal cancer in February 2000, Gifford spent his remaining months reading, watching old movies, and chatting with friends and family. He died in Dubuque on October 31, 2000.

Gifford lived life large, had friends throughout the world, and lived life by his favorite credo—"we're not here for a long time; we're here for a good time."

=== As Thomas Gifford ===
- 1975 – The Wind Chill Factor
- 1976 – The Cavanaugh Quest (nominated for the Edgar Award 1977)
- 1977 – The Man from Lisbon
- 1978 – The Glendower Legacy
- 1979 – Hollywood Gothic
- 1990 – The Assassini
- 1993 – Praetorian
- 1994 – The First Sacrifice
- 1996 – Saint's Rest

=== As Thomas Maxwell ===
- 1986 – Kiss Me Once
- 1987 – The Saberdene Variations
- 1988 – Kiss Me Twice
- 1990 – The Suspense Is Killing Me

=== As Dana Clarins ===
- 1984 – Woman in the Window
- 1985 – Guilty Parties
- 1986 – The Woman Who Knew Too Much

=== As Lisa Drake ===
- 1984 – The Medical Center Murders (with Otto Penzler, from an outline by Edward D. Hoch.)
