= Forged in Fury =

Studio album by Krisiun
- Released: 7 August 2015
- Genre: Death metal
- Length: 51:29
- Label: Century Media
- Producer: Erik Rutan and Krisiun

Krisiun chronology
The Great Execution (2011)	Forged in Fury (2015)	Scourge of the Enthroned (2018)

Forged in Fury is the ninth studio album by Brazilian death metal band Krisiun. It was released on 7 August 2015 by Century Media Records and produced by Erik Rutan.

== Track listing ==
No.	Title	Length
1.	"Scars of the Hatred"	5:42
2.	"Ways of Barbarism"	6:32
3.	"Dogma of Submission"	4:55
4.	"Strength Forged in Fury"	6:07
5.	"Soulless Impaler"	6:11
6.	"Burning of the Heretic"	6:21
7.	"The Isolated Truth"	4:09
8.	"Oracle of the Ungod"	4:43
9.	"Timeless Starvation"	5:56
10.	"Milonga de la Muerte"	0:53

== Personnel ==
Krisiun

- Alex Camargo – bass, vocals
- Moyses Kolesne – guitars
- Max Kolesne – drums

Production and artwork

- Erik Rutan – production, recording, mixing, and mastering
- Joe Petagno – artwork
- Krisiun – production
