= List of short stories by Guy de Maupassant =

Bibliography

This article lists the complete bibliography of short stories by Guy de Maupassant.

== List ==
Short stories by Guy de Maupassant
Original title	Translated title	Originally published	Date published	Pseudonym used	Former title
Un bandit corse	"The Corsican bandit"	Gil Blas	5/25/1882	Maufrigneuse	
Une partie de campagne	"A country excursion"	Modern Life	04/02/1881 – 04/09/1881		
Un coup d’État	"A Coup d'État"	Moonlight collection	10/1/1883		
Un lâche	"A coward"	Le Gaulois	1/27/1884		
Un cas de divorce	A divorce case	Gil Blas	8/31/1886		
Un duel	A duel	Le Gaulois	8/14/1883		
Un échec	A failure	Gil Blas	6/16/1885		
Une famille	A family	Gil Blas	8/3/1886		
Une lettre	A letter	Gil Blas	6/12/1885	Maufrigneuse	
Un fou	A crazy fool	Le Gaulois	9/2/1885		
Un fou ?	A fool?	Le Figaro	9/1/1884		
Un réveillon	A New Year's Eve	Gil Blas	1/5/1882	Maufrigneuse	
Un normand	A Norman	Gil Blas	10/10/1882	Maufrigneuse	
Une page d’histoire inédite	A page of unpublished history	Le Gaulois	10/27/1880		
Une aventure parisienne	"An Adventure in Paris"	Gil Blas	12/22/1881	Maufrigneuse	A Trial
Un parricide	Murder in the family	Le Gaulois	9/25/1882		
Une passion	A passion	Gil Blas	8/22/1882	Maufrigneuse	
Un portrait	A portrait	Le Gaulois	10/29/1888		
Un coq chanta	A rooster sang	Gil Blas	7/5/1882	Maufrigneuse	
Une ruse	A ruse	Gil Blas	9/25/1882	Maufrigneuse	
Une vente	A sale	Gil Blas	2/22/1884	Maufrigneuse	
Un fils	"The son"	Gil Blas	4/19/1882	Maufrigneuse	Father Unknown
Une surprise	A surprise	Gil Blas	5/15/1883	Maufrigneuse	
Un drame vrai	A True Drama	Le Gaulois	8/6/1882		
Une vendetta	"Vendetta"	Le Gaulois	10/14/1883		
Une veuve	"A widow"	Le Gaulois	9/1/1882		
Un sage	A wiseman	Gil Blas	12/4/1883	Maufrigneuse	
Après	"After" (Note: Date of composition unknown, but most likely 1891.)	The Peddler posthumous collection	3/14/1905		
Cri d’alarme	Alarm bells	Gil Blas	11/23/1886		
Alexandre	"Alexandre"	L'Écho de Paris	9/2/1889		
Allouma	"Allouma"	L'Écho de Paris	02/10/1889 – 02/15/1889		
Une soirée	An evening	Le Gaulois	9/21/1883		
Une soirée	An evening	Gil Blas	3/29/1887		
Un vieux	"Old man"	Gil Blas	9/26/1882	Maufrigneuse	
Apparition	"The Apparition"	Le Gaulois	4/4/1883		
La nuit	"The Night: a Nightmare"	Gil Blas	6/14/1887		
En mer	"At Sea"	Gil Blas	2/12/1883	Maufrigneuse	
Au bord du lit	At the edge of the bed	Gil Blas	10/23/1883	Maufrigneuse	
Réveil	Awakening	Gil Blas	2/20/1883	Maufrigneuse	
Le baptême	Baptism	Le Gaulois	1/14/1884		
Le baptême	Baptism	Gil Blas	1/13/1885		
La baronne	The baroness	Gil Blas	5/17/1887		
Le lit 29	"Bed 29"	Gil Blas	7/8/1884	Maufrigneuse	
Berthe	"Bertha"	Le Figaro	10/20/1884		
Boitelle	"Boitelle"	L'Écho de Paris	1/22/1889		
Bombard	Bombardment	Gil Blas	10/28/1884		
Garçon, un Bock !...	Boy, a Beer !...	Gil Blas	1/1/1884	Maufrigneuse	
En wagon	By coach	Gil Blas	3/24/1885		
Châli	Sweetheart	Gil Blas	4/15/1884	Maufrigneuse	
Nuit de Noël	Christmas Eve	Gil Blas	12/26/1882	Maufrigneuse	
Conte de Noël	Christmas Tale	Le Gaulois	12/25/1882		
Chronique	Chronicle	Le Gaulois	4/14/1884		
Coco	"Coco"	Le Gaulois	1/21/1884		
Coco, Coco, Coco frais !	Coco, Coco, Coco Fresh!	The Mosaic	9/14/1878	Guy de Valmont	
La confession	Confession	Gil Blas	8/12/1884		
Confession d’une femme	A woman's confession	Gil Blas	6/28/1882	Maufrigneuse	
La confidence	Confidence	Gil Blas	8/20/1885		
Conflits pour rire	Amusing conflicts	Gil Blas	5/1/1882	Maufrigneuse	
Correspondence	Correspondence	Gil Blas	8/30/1882	Maufrigneuse	
Histoire corse	Corsican history	Le Gaulois	12/1/1881	Maufrigneuse	
La toux	Cough	Panurge	1/28/1883		
Fou ?	Crazy?	Gil Blas	8/23/1882	Maufrigneuse	
Décoré !	Decorated!	Gil Blas	11/13/1883	Maufrigneuse	
Denis	"Denis"	Le Gaulois	6/28/1883		
Découverte	Discovery	Le Gaulois	9/4/1884		
Divorce	Divorce	Gil Blas	2/21/1888		
Le docteur Héraclius Gloss	Dr Héraclius Gloss (Note: Probably written in the closing months of 1875.)	The Paris Review	11/15/1875 (chapters I to XVII) – 12/01/1921 (chapters XVIII at the end)		
Rêves	Dreams	Le Gaulois	6/8/1882		
Duchoux	Duchoux	Le Gaulois	11/14/1887		
Enragée ?	Enraged?	Gil Blas	8/7/1883	Maufrigneuse	
Étrennes	Presents	Gil Blas	1/7/1887		
Adieu	Farewell	Gil Blas	3/18/1884	Maufrigneuse	
Le père Amable	Father Amable	Gil Blas	04/30/1886 – 05/04/1886		
Le père Judas	Father Judas	Le Gaulois	2/28/1883		
Le père Milon	"Father Milon"	Le Gaulois	5/22/1883		
Le père Mongilet	Father Mongilet	Gil Blas	2/24/1885		
La peur	Fear	Le Gaulois	10/23/1882		
La peur	Fear	Le Figaro	7/25/1884		
Jour de fête	Festival Day	Gil Blas	7/20/1886		
Première neige	First snow	Le Gaulois	12/11/1883		
À vendre	For sale	Le Figaro	1/5/1885		
Le pardon	Forgiveness	Le Gaulois	10/16/1882		
Fini	Gone	Le Gaulois	7/27/1885		
Le bonheur	Happiness	Le Gaulois	3/16/1884		
Hautot père et fils	The Hautots: father and son	L'Écho de Paris	1/5/1889		
Voyage de santé	Health travel	The Little Diary	4/18/1886		
Lui ?	Him?	Gil Blas	7/3/1883	Maufrigneuse	
Histoire d’un chien	A Dog's story	Le Gaulois	6/2/1881		
Comment on cause	How to Cause	Gil Blas	11/29/1887		
Misère humaine	Human misery	Gil Blas	6/8/1886		
Humble drame	Humble drama	Gil Blas	10/2/1883	Maufrigneuse	
Idylle	Idyll	Gil Blas	2/12/1884	Maufrigneuse	
Imprudence	Imprudence	Gil Blas	9/15/1885	Maufrigneuse	
Au printemps	In Spring	Tellier collection	4/21/1881		
Aux champs	In the fields	Le Gaulois	10/31/1882		
Aux eaux	In the water	Le Gaulois	7/24/1883		
Au bois	In the woods	Gil Blas	6/22/1886		
Ça ira	It'll be okay	Gil Blas	11/10/1885		
Jadis	Back then (Note: Originally "The Advice of a Grandmother", then revised and retitled "Jadis", Gil Blas, 30 October 1883.)	Le Gaulois	9/13/1880	Maufrigneuse	
Joseph	Joseph	Gil Blas	7/21/1885		
Julie Romain	Julie Roman	Le Gaulois	3/20/1886		
La Martine	The marten	Gil Blas	9/11/1883	Maufrigneuse	
Le gueux	The beggar	Le Gaulois	3/9/1884		
L’héritage	Legacy	Illustrated Military Life	03/15/1884 – 04/26/1884		
Lettre trouvée sur un noyé	"Found on a Drowned Man"	Gil Blas	1/8/1884	Maufrigneuse	
Lettre d’un fou	Letter from a madman	Gil Blas	2/17/1885	Maufrigneuse	
La petite Roque	Little Rock	Gil Blas	12/18/1885 – 12/23/1885		
Petit soldat	Little Soldier	Le Figaro	4/13/1885		
Amour	Love	Gil Blas	12/7/1886		
Madame Baptiste	Mrs Baptiste	Gil Blas	11/28/1882	Maufrigneuse	
Madame Hermet	Mrs Hermet	Gil Blas	1/18/1887		
Le rosier de Madame Husson	"Madame Husson's boy hero"	The New Review	6/15/1887		
Madame Parisse	Mrs Parisse	Gil Blas	3/16/1886		
Mademoiselle Cocotte	Miss Cocotte	Gil Blas	3/20/1883	Maufrigneuse	
Mademoiselle Perle	Miss Perle	Le Figaro literary supplement	1/16/1886		
Magnétisme	Magnetism	Gil Blas	4/5/1882	Maufrigneuse	
Marroca	"Marroca"	Gil Blas	3/2/1882	Maufrigneuse	Marauca
Rencontre	Meeting	Le Gaulois	5/26/1882		
Rencontre	Meeting	Gil Blas	3/11/1884	Maufrigneuse	
Souvenirs	Memories	Le Gaulois	3/23/1884		
Menuet	Minuet	Le Gaulois	11/20/1882		
Mademoiselle Fifi	Miss Fifi	Gil Blas	3/23/1882	Maufrigneuse	
Miss Harriet	Miss Harriet	Le Gaulois	7/9/1883		Miss Hastings
Misti (Souvenirs d’un garçon)	Misti (memories of a Boy)	Gil Blas	1/22/1884	Maufrigneuse	
Mohammed-Fripouille	Mohammed-Fripouille	Le Gaulois	9/20/1884		
Moiron	"Moiron"	Gil Blas	9/27/1887		
Clair de lune	Moonlight	Le Gaulois	7/1/1882		
Clair de lune	Moonlight	Gil Blas	10/19/1882	Maufrigneuse	
La mère aux monstres	Mother to Monsters	Gil Blas	6/12/1883	Maufrigneuse	
Mouche	Fly	L'Écho de Paris	2/7/1890		
Monsieur Parent	Mr Parent	Political and Literary Debate Journal	11/10/1885		
M. Jocaste	Mr Jocaste	Gil Blas	1/23/1883	Maufrigneuse	
Mes vingt-cinq jours	My twenty-five days	Gil Blas	8/25/1885		
Mon oncle Jules	My Uncle Jules	Le Gaulois	8/7/1883		
Mon oncle Sosthène	Uncle Sosthene	Gil Blas	8/12/1882	Maufrigneuse	
Ma femme	My wife	Gil Blas	12/5/1882	Maufrigneuse	
Farce normande	Norman farce	Gil Blas	8/8/1882	Maufrigneuse	
Notes d’un voyageur	Traveller's notes	Le Gaulois	2/4/1884		
Vieux objets	Old things	Gil Blas	3/29/1882	Maufrigneuse	
En voyage	"En Voyage"	Gil Blas	5/10/1882	Maufrigneuse	
Par un soir de printemps	A Spring Evening	Le Gaulois	5/7/1881		
Sur les chats	On cats	Gil Blas	2/9/1886		
À cheval	On horseback	Le Gaulois	1/14/1883		
En voyage	On the road	Le Gaulois	5/10/1883		
Sur l’eau	On the water	Le Bulletin Français	3/10/1876		En cannot
Un soir	One Evening	The Illustration	01/19/1889 – 01/23/1889		
Un million	One million	Gil Blas	11/2/1882	Maufrigneuse	
Autres temps	Other times	Gil Blas	6/14/1882	Maufrigneuse	
Nos anglais	"Our Friends The English"	Gil Blas	2/10/1885		
Nos lettres	Our letters	Le Gaulois	2/29/1888		
La femme de Paul	Paul's wife	Tellier collection	4/21/1881		
Pétition d’un viveur malgré lui	Petition of a viveur in spite of himself	Gil Blas	1/12/1882	Maufrigneuse	
Pierrot	"Pierrot"	Le Gaulois	10/9/1882		
Les prisonniers	"The Prisoners"	Gil Blas	12/30/1884		
Promenade	Promenade	Gil Blas	5/27/1884	Maufrigneuse	
Opinion publique	Public opinion	Le Gaulois	3/21/1881		
La reine Hortense	Queen Hortense	Gil Blas	4/24/1883	Maufrigneuse	
Regret	Regret	Le Gaulois	11/4/1883		
Souvenir	Remembrance	Gil Blas	2/16/1882	Maufrigneuse	
Souvenir	Remembrance	Gil Blas	5/20/1884	Maufrigneuse	
La revanche	Revenge	Gil Blas	11/18/1884		
La chambre 11	Room 11	Gil Blas	12/9/1884		
Rosalie Prudent	Rosalie Prudent	Gil Blas	3/2/1886		
Rose	"Rose"	Gil Blas	1/29/1884	Maufrigneuse	
Rouerie	Cunning	Gil Blas	12/12/1882	Maufrigneuse	
La rouille	Rust	Gil Blas	9/14/1882	Maufrigneuse	M. de Coutelier
Tribunaux rustiques	Rustic Courts	Gil Blas	11/25/1884	Maufrigneuse	
Saint-Antoine	Saint-Antoine	Gil Blas	4/3/1883	Maufrigneuse	
Sauvée	Saved	Gil Blas	12/22/1885		
Malades et médecins	Sickness and doctors	Le Gaulois	5/11/1884		
Le papa de Simon	"Simon's Papa"	Political and Literary Reformation	12/1/1879		
Solitude	"Solitude"	Le Gaulois	3/31/1884		
Histoire d’une fille de ferme	Story of a girl farmhand	The Political and Literary Review (Blue edn)	3/26/1881		
Suicides	Suicides (Note: Originally published in a different form under the alternative title, then revised and published in Gil Blas, 17 April 1883.)	Le Gaulois	8/29/1880	Maufrigneuse	
Les dimanches d’un bourgeois de Paris	Parisian middle-class Sundays	Le Gaulois	05/31/1880 – 08/16/1880		
Boule de suif	"Boule de Suif" (Lump of lard, Ball of Suet, Butter Ball)	Les soirées de Médan collection	4/16/1880		
L’abandonné	"Abandoned"	Le Figaro	8/15/1884		
La parure	The Necklace	Le Gaulois	02/17/1884		
L’aventure de Walter Schnaffs	The Adventure of Walter Schnaffs	Le Gaulois	4/11/1883		
L’assassin	The Assassin	Gil Blas	11/1/1887		
Le vengeur	The Avenger	Gil Blas	11/6/1883	Maufrigneuse	
La bête à Maît’ Belhomme	Belhomme's Beast	Gil Blas	9/22/1885		
Le lit	The Bed	Gil Blas	3/16/1882	Maufrigneuse	
Le donneur d’eau bénite	The donor of blessed water	The Mosaic	11/10/1877	Guy de Valmont	
L’aveugle	The Blind	Le Gaulois	3/31/1882		
La patronne	The Patron	Gil Blas	4/1/1884	Maufrigneuse	
Le gâteau	"The Cake"	Gil Blas	1/19/1882	Maufrigneuse	
Les caresses	Caressing	Gil Blas	8/14/1883	Maufrigneuse	
Le cas de Mme Luneau	The case of Mrs Luneau	Gil Blas	8/21/1883	Maufrigneuse	
L’enfant	"The Child"	Le Gaulois	7/24/1882		
L’enfant	The Child	Gil Blas	9/18/1883	Maufrigneuse	
La confession	The Confession	Le Gaulois	10/21/1883		The Confession
L’aveu	The Confession	Gil Blas	7/22/1884		
La confession	The Confession	Le Figaro	11/10/1884		
La confession de Théodule Sabot	"Theodule Sabot's Confession"	Gil Blas	10/9/1883	Maufrigneuse	
Le crime au père Boniface	The Crime against Father Boniface	Gil Blas	6/24/1884		
L’infirme	The Crippled	Le Gaulois	10/21/1888		
Le pain maudit	The Cursed Bread	Gil Blas	5/29/1883	Maufrigneuse	
La morte	The Dead	Gil Blas	5/31/1887		
Le condamné à mort	The death row inmate	Gil Blas	4/10/1883	Maufrigneuse	
Le diable	"The Devil"	Le Gaulois	8/5/1886		
L’âne	"The Donkey"	Le Gaulois	7/15/1883		The Good Day
La dot	"The Dowry"	Gil Blas	9/9/1884		
Le noyé	"The Drowned Man"	Le Gaulois	8/16/1888		
L’ivrogne	The Drunk	Le Gaulois	4/20/1884		
L’orient	The East	Le Gaulois	9/13/1883		
Le mal d’André	The evil of André	Gil Blas	7/24/1883	Maufrigneuse	
La farce (Mémoires d’un farceur)	The farce: Memoirs of a prankster	Gil Blas	12/18/1883	Maufrigneuse	
Le fermier	The Farmer	Le Gaulois	10/11/1886		
Le père	The father	Gil Blas	11/20/1883	Maufrigneuse	
Le père	The Father	Gil Blas	7/26/1887		
L’ami Joseph	"Friend Joseph"	Le Gaulois	6/3/1883		
La porte	The Gate	Gil Blas	5/3/1887		
La serre	The Greenhouse	Gil Blas	6/26/1883	Maufrigneuse	
Le garde	The Guard	Le Gaulois	10/8/1884		
La chevelure	The hair	Gil Blas	5/13/1884	Maufrigneuse	
La main	The Hand	Le Gaulois	12/23/1883		
L’ermite	The Hermit	Gil Blas	1/26/1886		
Le trou	The Hole	Gil Blas	11/9/1886		
Les sabots	The hooves	Gil Blas	1/21/1883	Maufrigneuse	
Le Horla	The Horla	Le Horla collection (Ollendorff edn)	5/25/1887		
Le Horla (première version)	The Horla (first version)	Gil Blas	10/26/1886		
L’horrible	The Horrible	Le Gaulois	5/18/1884		
Les idées du Colonel	The Colonel's ideas	Le Gaulois	6/9/1884		
L’auberge	The Inn	Arts and Letters	9/1/1886		
Les bijoux	The Jewels	Gil Blas	3/27/1883	Maufrigneuse	
Les rois	The Kings	Le Gaulois	1/23/1887		
Le baiser	"The Kiss"	Gil Blas	11/14/1882	Maufrigneuse	
Le saut du berger	The Leap of the Shepherd	Gil Blas	3/9/1882	Maufrigneuse	
Le legs	The Legacy	Gil Blas	9/23/1884		
La légende du Mont Saint-Michel	The legend of Mont Saint-Michel	Gil Blas	12/19/1882	Maufrigneuse	
Le petit	The Little One	Le Gaulois	8/19/1883		
Le verrou	The lock	Gil Blas	7/25/1882	Maufrigneuse	
La bûche	"The Log"	Gil Blas	1/26/1882	Maufrigneuse	
La folle	Madness	Le Gaulois	12/5/1882		
L’homme de Mars	The Man of Mars	Paris-Christmas	1887–1888		
L’homme-fille	The man-daughter	Gil Blas	3/13/1883	Maufrigneuse	
Le marquis de Fumerol	The Marquis de Fumerol	Gil Blas	10/5/1886		
Le masque	The Mask	L'Écho de Paris	5/10/1889		
Le modèle	The Model	Le Gaulois	12/17/1883		
La moustache	The mustache	Gil Blas	7/31/1883	Maufrigneuse	
L’odyssée d’une fille	The Odyssey of a Girl	Gil Blas	9/25/1883	Maufrigneuse	
Le vieux	"The Old Man"	Le Gaulois	1/6/1884		
Le champ d’oliviers	The olive field	Le Figaro	02/19/1890 – 02/23/1890		
L’ordonnance	The Ordinance	Gil Blas	8/23/1887		
L’orphelin	The Orphan	Le Gaulois	6/15/1883		
L’ami Patience	Friend Patience	Gil Blas	9/4/1883	Maufrigneuse	The Friend
Le colporteur	The peddler	Le Figaro	3/8/1893		
La main d’écorché	The Peeled Hand	Lorraine Almanac	?/?/1875	Joseph Prunier	
L’épingle	The Pin	Gil Blas	8/13/1885	Maufrigneuse	
Les épingles	The Pins	Gil Blas	1/10/1888		
Le port	The Port	L'Écho de Paris	3/15/1889		
Le protecteur	"The Protector"	Gil Blas	2/5/1884	Maufrigneuse	
Le bûcher	The Pyre	Le Figaro	9/7/1884		
La question du Latin	The Question of Latin	Le Gaulois	9/2/1886		
Le lapin	The Rabbit	Gil Blas	7/19/1887		
La rempailleuse	The Refiller	Le Gaulois	9/17/1882		
La relique	The Relic	Gil Blas	10/17/1882	Maufrigneuse	
Le rendez-vous	The rendezvous	L'Écho de Paris	02/23/1889		
Le retour	The Return	Le Gaulois	7/28/1884		
La roche aux guillemots	The Rock with The Guillemots	Le Gaulois	4/14/1882		
Les sœurs Rondoli	"The Rondoli Sisters"	L'Écho de Paris	05/29/1884 – 06/05/1884		
Le signe	The Sign	Gil Blas	4/27/1886		
L’endormeuse	The Sleeper	L'Écho de Paris	9/16/1889		
Le petit fût	The small cask	Le Gaulois	4/7/1884		
La ficelle	"The Piece of String"	Le Gaulois	11/25/1883		
Le remplaçant	The substitute	Gil Blas	1/2/1883	Maufrigneuse	Replacements
La maison Tellier	The Tellier household	Tellier collection	4/21/1881		
Le voleur	"The Thief"	Gil Blas	6/21/1882	Maufrigneuse	
Le tic	The Spasm	Le Gaulois	7/14/1884		
La tombe	The tomb	Gil Blas	7/29/1884	Maufrigneuse	
Les tombales	"Tombstones"	Gil Blas	1/9/1891		
L’épreuve	The Trial	L'Écho de Paris	7/13/1889		
Les vingt-cinq francs de la supérieure	Twenty-five superior francs	Gil Blas	3/28/1888		
Le parapluie	"The Umbrella"	Le Gaulois	2/10/1884		
L’inconnue	The Unknown	Gil Blas	1/27/1885		
L’inutile beauté	The Useless Beauty	L'Écho de Paris	04/02/1890 – 04/07/1890		
La veillée	The vigil	Gil Blas	6/7/1882	Maufrigneuse	
Le voyage du Horla	The Voyage du Horla	Le Figaro	7/16/1887		From Paris to Heyst
Le vagabond	"A Vagabond"	The New Review	1/1/1887		
L’armoire	"The Wardrobe"	Gil Blas	12/16/1884	Maufrigneuse	
Le moyen de Roger	The Way of Roger	Gil Blas	3/3/1885	Maufrigneuse	
Le mariage du lieutenant Laré	The wedding of Lieutenant Laré	The Mosaic	5/25/1878	Guy de Valmont	
La mère Sauvage	Mother Savage	Le Gaulois	3/3/1884		
Le testament	The Will	Gil Blas	11/7/1882	Maufrigneuse	
La fenêtre	The Window	Gil Blas	7/10/1883	Maufrigneuse	
Le loup	"The Wolf"	Le Gaulois	11/14/1882		
La bécasse	The woodcock	Le Gaulois	12/5/1882		La fou
Les bécasses	The Woodcocks	Gil Blas	10/20/1885		
L’épave	The Wreck	Le Gaulois	1/1/1886		
Ce cochon de Morin	This Morin pig	Gil Blas	11/21/1882	Maufrigneuse	
Tombouctou	Timbuktu	Le Gaulois	8/2/1883		
Clochette	"Clochette"	Gil Blas	12/21/1886		
Toine	Tony	Gil Blas	1/6/1885	Maufrigneuse	
Histoire vraie	True Story	Le Gaulois	6/18/1882		
Deux amis	"Two Friends"	Gil Blas	2/5/1883	Maufrigneuse	
Vains conseils	Vain advice	Gil Blas	2/26/1884	Maufrigneuse	
L’attente	Waiting	Le Gaulois	11/11/1883		
Voyage de noce	Wedding Trip	Le Gaulois	8/18/1882		
Blanc et Bleu	White and Blue	Gil Blas	2/3/1885	Maufrigneuse	
Qui sait ?	"Who Knows?"	L'Écho de Paris	4/6/1890		
Auprès d’un mort	With a deadman	Gil Blas	1/30/1883	Maufrigneuse	
En famille	With the Family	The New Review	2/15/1881		
Mots d’amour	Words of love	Gil Blas	2/2/1882	Maufrigneuse	
Épaves	Wrecks	Le Gaulois	12/9/1881		
Yveline Samoris	"Yvette Samoris"	Le Gaulois	12/20/1882		
Yvette	Yvette	Le Figaro	08/29/1884 – 09/09/1884		
