= Works of Carnage =

Studio album by Krisiun
- Released: 7 October 2003
- Genre: Death metal
- Length: 35:26
- Label: Century Media

Krisiun chronology
Ageless Venomous (2001)	Works of Carnage (2003)	Bloodshed (2004)

Works of Carnage is the fifth album by Brazilian death metal band Krisiun.

== Track listing ==
No.	Title	Length
1.	"Thorns of Heaven"	3:52
2.	"Murderer"	2:43
3.	"Ethereal World"	2:20
4.	"Works of Carnage"	3:27
5.	"Slaughtering Void"	3:05
6.	"Scourged Centuries"	2:21
7.	"War Ritual"	1:12
8.	"Wolfen Tyranny"	2:53
9.	"Sentinel of the Fallen Earth"	3:13
10.	"Shadows"	1:49
11.	"In League with Satan" (Venom cover)	2:48
12.	"Outro"	2:09
13.	"They Call Me Death"	2:43
Total length:		35:26

== Credits ==
- Moyses Kolesne – guitars
- Max Kolesne – drums
- Alex Camargo – bass, vocals
- Andy Classen – producer
- Jacek Wiśniewski – cover art
