= Krisiun =

Brazilian death metal band

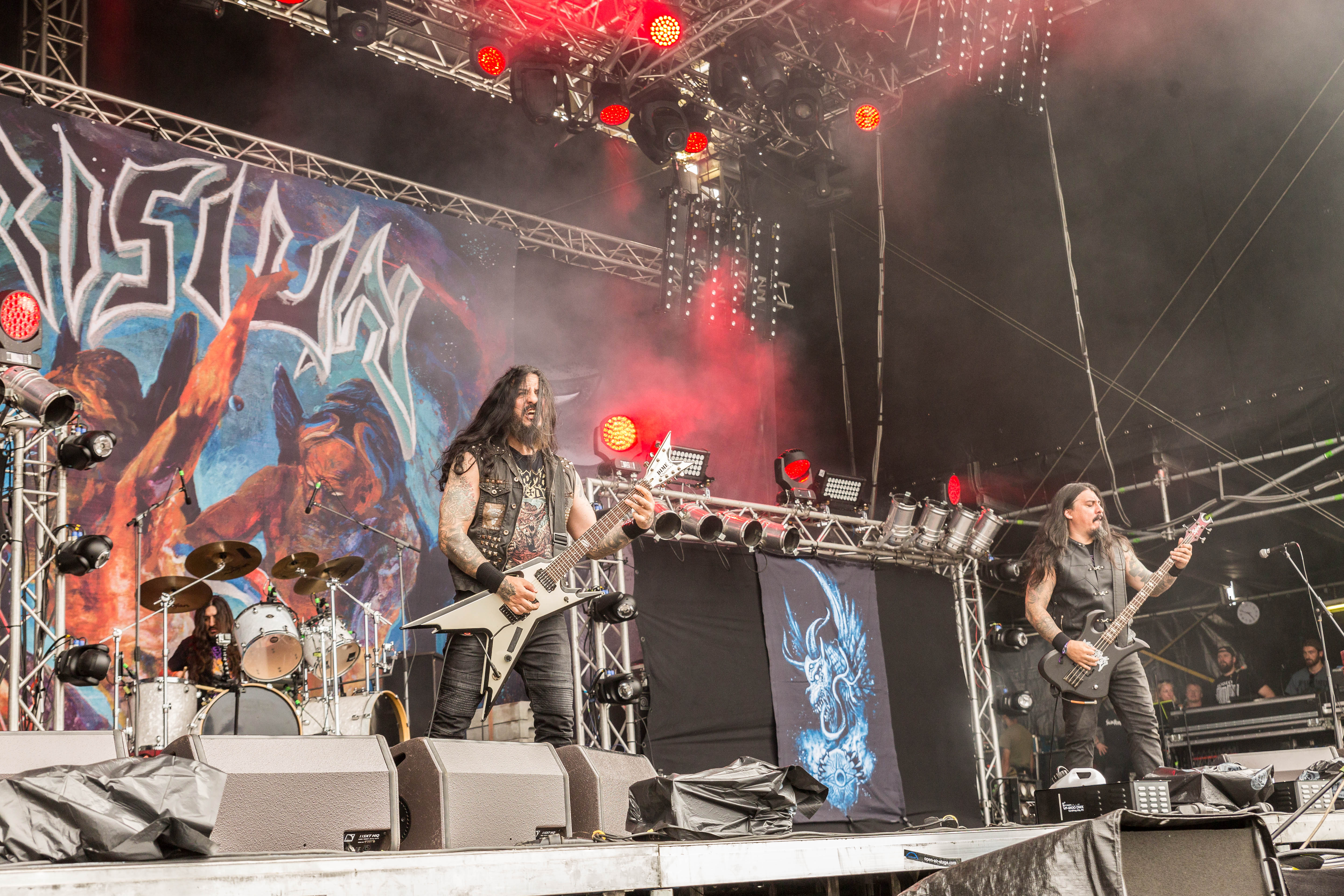
- Krisiun in 2019

Background information
- Origin: Ijuí, Rio Grande do Sul, Brazil
- Genre: Death metal
- Years active: 1990–present
- Labels: GUN, Century Media, Dynamo
- Members: Alex Camargo; Moyses Kolesne; Max Kolesne
- Past members: Altemir Souza; Mauricio Nogueira
- Website: www.krisiun.com.br

Krisiun is a Brazilian death metal band, founded in 1990 by brothers Alex Camargo (bass, vocals), Moyses Kolesne (guitars), and Max Kolesne (drums). Since its formation, the group recorded three demos, Curse of the Evil One in 1990, Mortal Toxic in 1991, and The Plague in 1992, and self-released an extended play (EP) Unmerciful Order in 1993. After signing with Brazilian label Dynamo Records, Krisiun released the debut full-length Black Force Domain in 1995, followed by Apocalyptic Revelation, in 1998. They signed with major label Century Media in 1999, releasing a further ten studio albums.

== History ==
Krisiun was formed in 1990 by sibling trio of vocalist/bassist Alex Camargo, guitarist Moyses Kolesne, and drummer Max Kolesne. Camargo billed himself as Alex Kolesne but has used his mother's maiden name as his stage name since 1995. They have toured North America, South America and Europe, recording their first official DVD in Poland.

The band is influenced by the debut albums of Sodom, Kreator, Morbid Angel and Slayer. Their violent lyrics and fast musical tempo make them an eminent extreme death metal band.

They released three demos before moving to São Paulo in 1995. Shortly after the move, second guitarist Altemir Souza left the band and returned to Porto Alegre, where he died in a motorbike accident in 2002.

The Unmerciful Order EP, their only "major" recording featuring a second guitarist, Mauricio Nogueira of Torture Squad, established the band as a cult act, a status confirmed by the release of their debut album, Black Force Domain, in 1995. The following albums improved their approach to death metal.

In February–March 2007, the band toured North America with Unleashed, Belphegor and Hatesphere. The band spent May and June 2007 in Europe with Immolation and Grave. They toured Northern Europe in September 2007. The last two weeks of September were spent in Russia on the Flaming Arts Festival tour. Krisiun toured Poland and the Balkans in October 2007, with Vader, Incantation and Rotting Christ.

In April–May 2008, the band recorded an album in Stage One Studios in Borgentreich, Germany. It was produced by Andy Classen, who had worked with the Brazilians on the album Conquerors of Armageddon and AssassiNation.

The new album was titled Southern Storm and released in Europe on 21 July 2008 via Century Media Records. The 12-track disc included a cover of "Refuse/Resist" by Sepultura from the Chaos A.D. album.

In 2009, they toured Europe with Nile, and in 2010, they toured the U.S. with Nile and Immolation.

In September–October 2015, they were part of The Devastation on the Nation tour in North America. They co-headlined the tour Origin. With Aeon, Alterbeast, Soreption and Ingested as support.

== Musical style and influences ==
Krisiun's lyrics are described as "savage" by AllMusic. The site described their sound as "a vicious, straight-ahead death metal style" and called them "one of the more punitive metal ensembles" of the 1990s. Their influences include Slayer, Sodom and Morbid Angel.

== Band members ==
Krisiun live at Metal Frenzy Open Air 2025

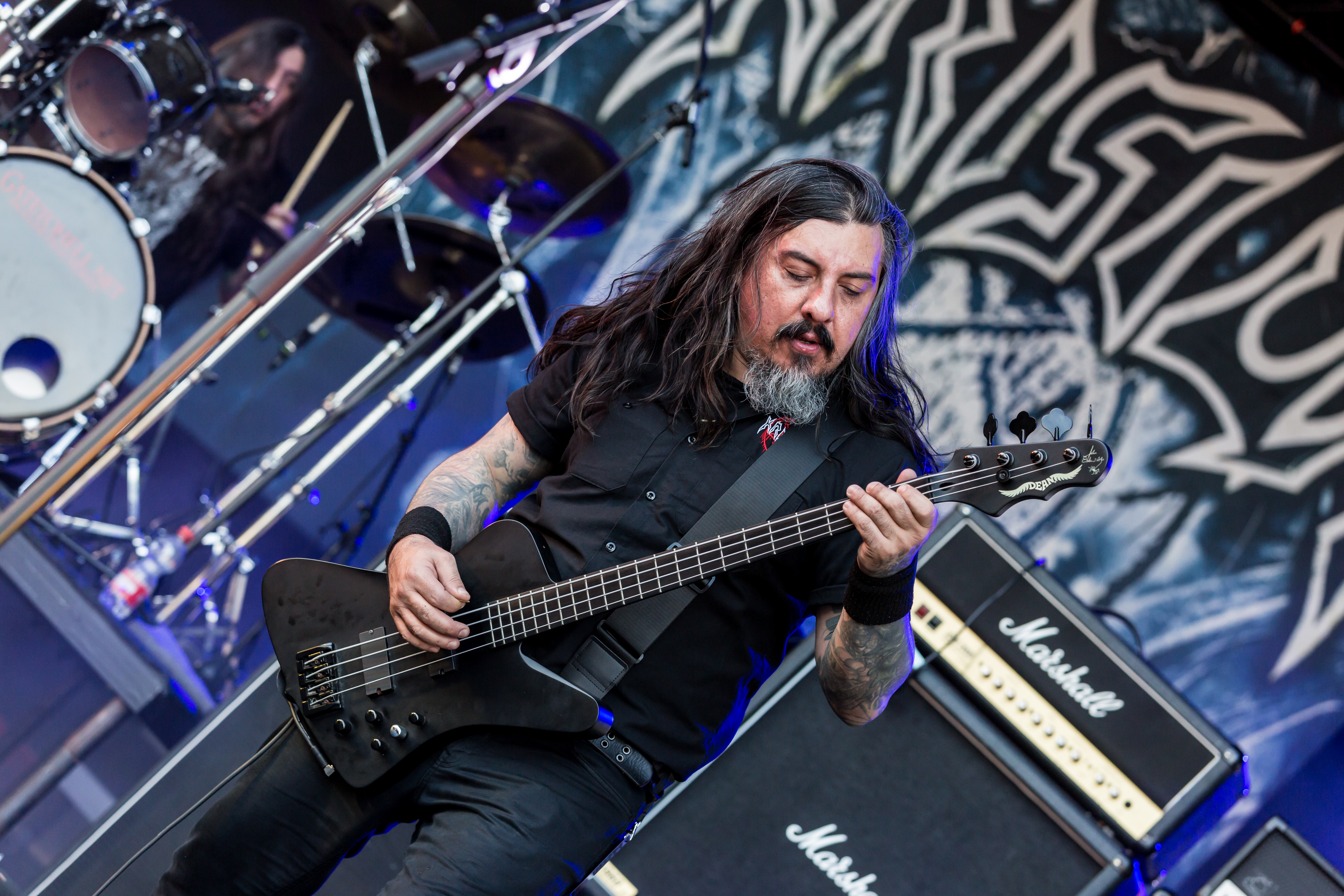
Alex Camargo

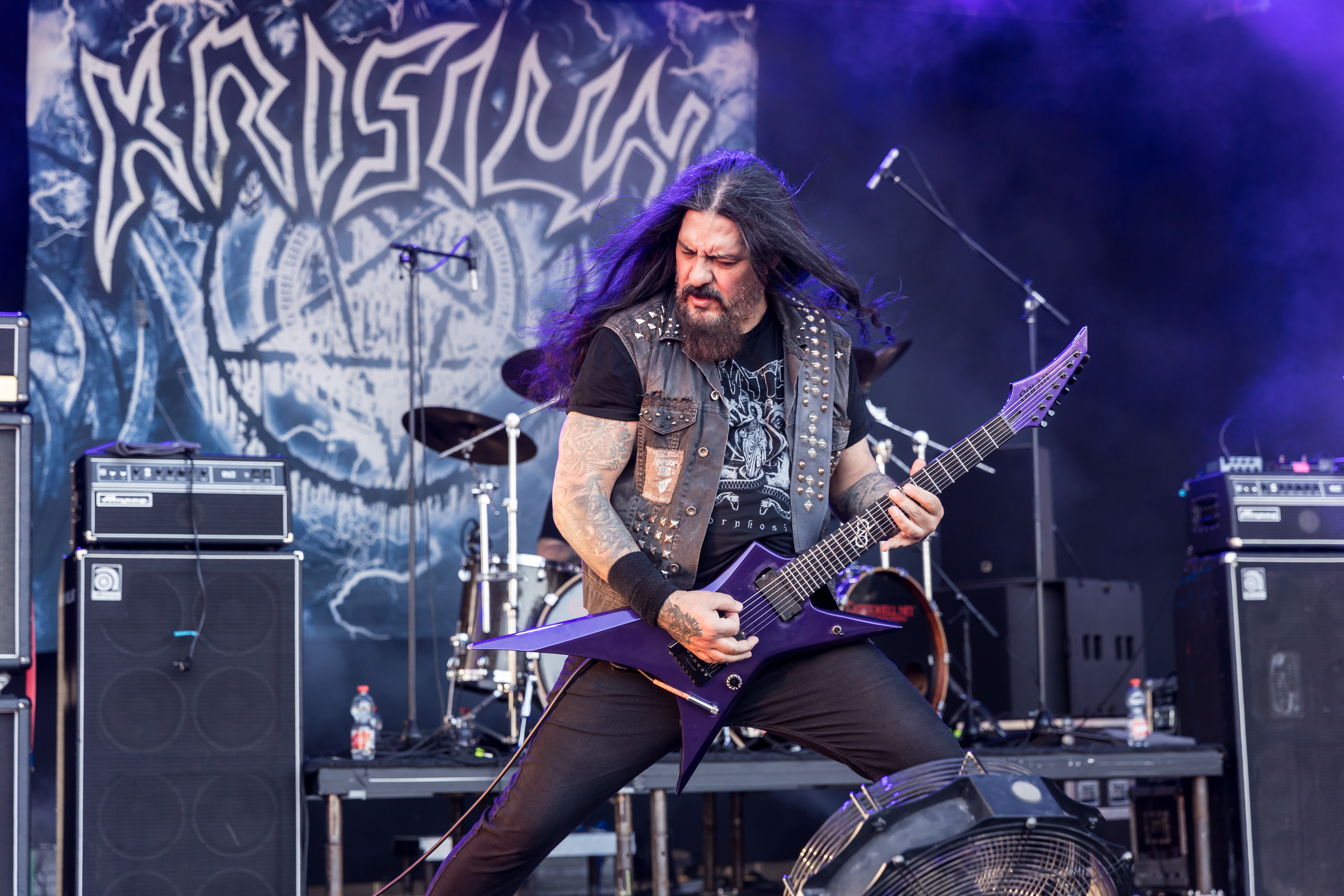
Moyses Kolesne

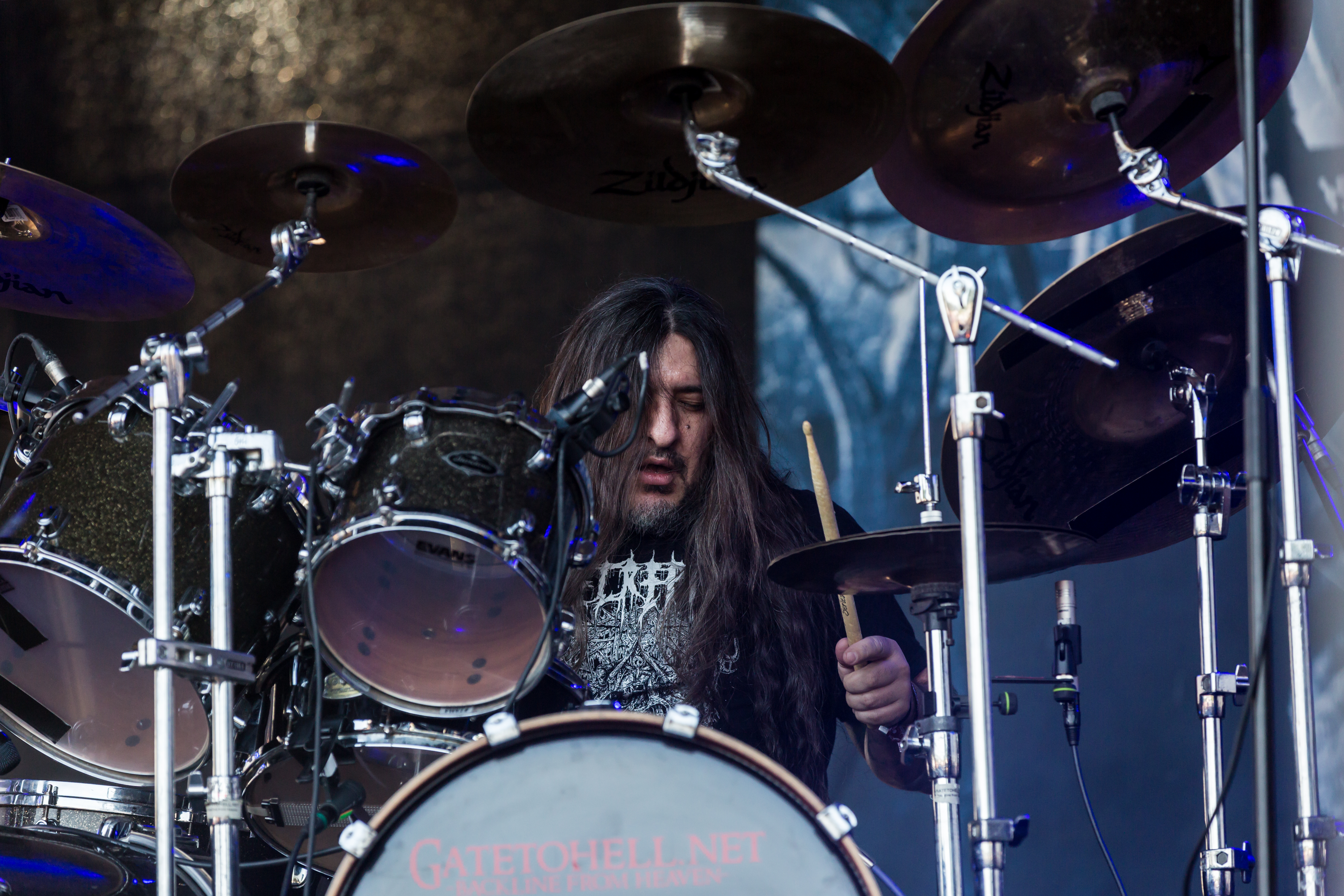
Max Kolesne

=== Current ===
- Alex Camargo – bass, vocals (1990–present)
- Moyses Kolesne – guitars (1990–present)
- Max Kolesne – drums (1990–present)

=== Former ===
- Altemir Souza – guitars (1990–1993; died 2002)
- Mauricio Nogueira – guitars (1994)

== Discography ==
=== Studio albums ===
- 1995: Black Force Domain
- 1998: Apocalyptic Revelation
- 2000: Conquerors of Armageddon
- 2001: Ageless Venomous
- 2003: Works of Carnage
- 2004: Bloodshed
- 2006: AssassiNation
- 2008: Southern Storm
- 2011: The Great Execution
- 2015: Forged in Fury
- 2018: Scourge of the Enthroned
- 2022: Mortem Solis

=== Live albums ===
- 2006: Live Armageddon
- 2016: Krisiun no Estúdio Showlivre

=== Compilation albums ===
- 2012: Arise From Blackness

=== EPs ===
- 1994: Unmerciful Order

=== Split ===
- 1993: Curse of the Evil One / In Between the Truth
- 1993: Harmony Dies / Rises From Black

=== Demos ===
- 1990: Curse of the Evil One
- 1991: Mortal Toxic
- 1992: The Plague

=== Music videos ===
Year	Title	Directed	Album
2000	"Hatred Inherit"	Chuck Hipolitho	Conquerors of Armageddon
2003	"Murderer"	—	Works of Carnage
2006	"Vicious Wrath"	—	AssassiNation
2008	"Combustion Inferno"	João Mauricio Leonel	Southern Storm
2010	"Sentenced Morning"	Juan "Punchy" Gonzalez	Southern Storm
2012	"The Will To Potency"	Tommy Jones	The Great Execution
2014	"Blood of Lions"		The Great Execution
