= The Judas Testament =

1994 novel by Daniel Easterman

- Cover of the 1994 Harper Collins edition
- Author: Daniel Easterman
- Language: English
- Publisher: HarperCollinsPublishers
- Publication date: 1994
- Dewey Decimal: 823.914
- LC Class: PR6055.A82 J83

The Judas Testament is a 1994 novel by Daniel Easterman. The plot revolved around the discovery of an ancient scroll hidden deep in the vaults of the Russian State Library in Moscow, and its translation by Dr. Jack Gould, a scholar of the Aramaic language, who becomes the unwitting pawn in a murderous struggle by various crypto-political forces to possess the scroll.

The scroll is not the Gospel of Judas but an autobiographical epistle of the historical Jesus in his own hand. It is a "Judas Testament" in that its contents betrays the conventional image of Jesus as Christ and instead reveals him to have been a Judean religious figure known as the Teacher of Righteousness. Easterman's ideas in this respect are taken directly from contemporary scholarship in the quest for the historical Jesus and the debate about whether or not there is a relationship between Jesus and the Judean sect known as the Essenes.
