= The Assassin (cancelled video game) =

- Developer: OMC Games
- Publisher: Hellified Games
- Programmers: Jim Krych; Sandro Sarang; Tim Wilson
- Artist: Kevin Burke
- Writer: James Garvin
- Composer: Arthur Lauritsen
- Platforms: Atari 8-bit, Atari Jaguar CD
- Release: Cancelled
- Genre: Action role-playing
- Mode: Single-player

The Assassin is an unreleased action role-playing video game that was in development by American studio OMC Games and planned to be published under the company's Hellified Games label on a scheduled Q1 2000 release date for the Atari Jaguar CD. It was intended to be a prequel to Orb Of Bengazi, another title that was in development by OMC for the add-on.

The Assassin takes place in the future of the year 2147 where the player assume the role of Michael Steele, a detective from Chicago who is put on a trial for killing the perpetrator who murdered his brother Kavanaugh Steele as an act of revenge, but starts delving more in-depth on his investigation and getting caught on a web of deception when looking for answers to questions he was previously not aware of. Conceived and originally in development for the Atari 8-bit computers, the game was later moved to the Jaguar CD after the author of the game came across with unforeseen technical issues with his 8-bit development equipment when moving from the United States to Japan. The title was also set to feature an internally developed role-playing game system called Blood City.

Although The Assassin was originally planned to be released sometime in 1999, it was later pushed back for release in 2000 but it never materialized in the end, despite reassurances by the developer. In addition to its prequel, OMC Games had three more games in development and planned to be released under their publishing label for the platform that failed to materialize as well.

== Gameplay ==
Gameplay screenshot from the second demo released, showcasing the conversation system

Gameplay in The Assassin would have revolved around the game world, visiting locations and interacting with the local inhabitants. The first demo that was officially released to the public is not interactive, while the second demo is playable but only to a certain point before gameplay stops. The final game would have made use of the internally developed Blood City RPG system.

== Synopsis ==
The Assassin takes place in the year 2147, where humans coexist with mythological creatures on a futuristic cyberpunk setting. Michael Steele, a human detective of Chicago travels to Austin, Texas in order to investigate the death of his younger brother Kavanaugh, only to find out that he was murdered. As a result, he soon tracks down his brother's assassin and kills the perpetrator without remorse but Michael is later caught and sent to prison, where he is put under trial for his action.

== History ==
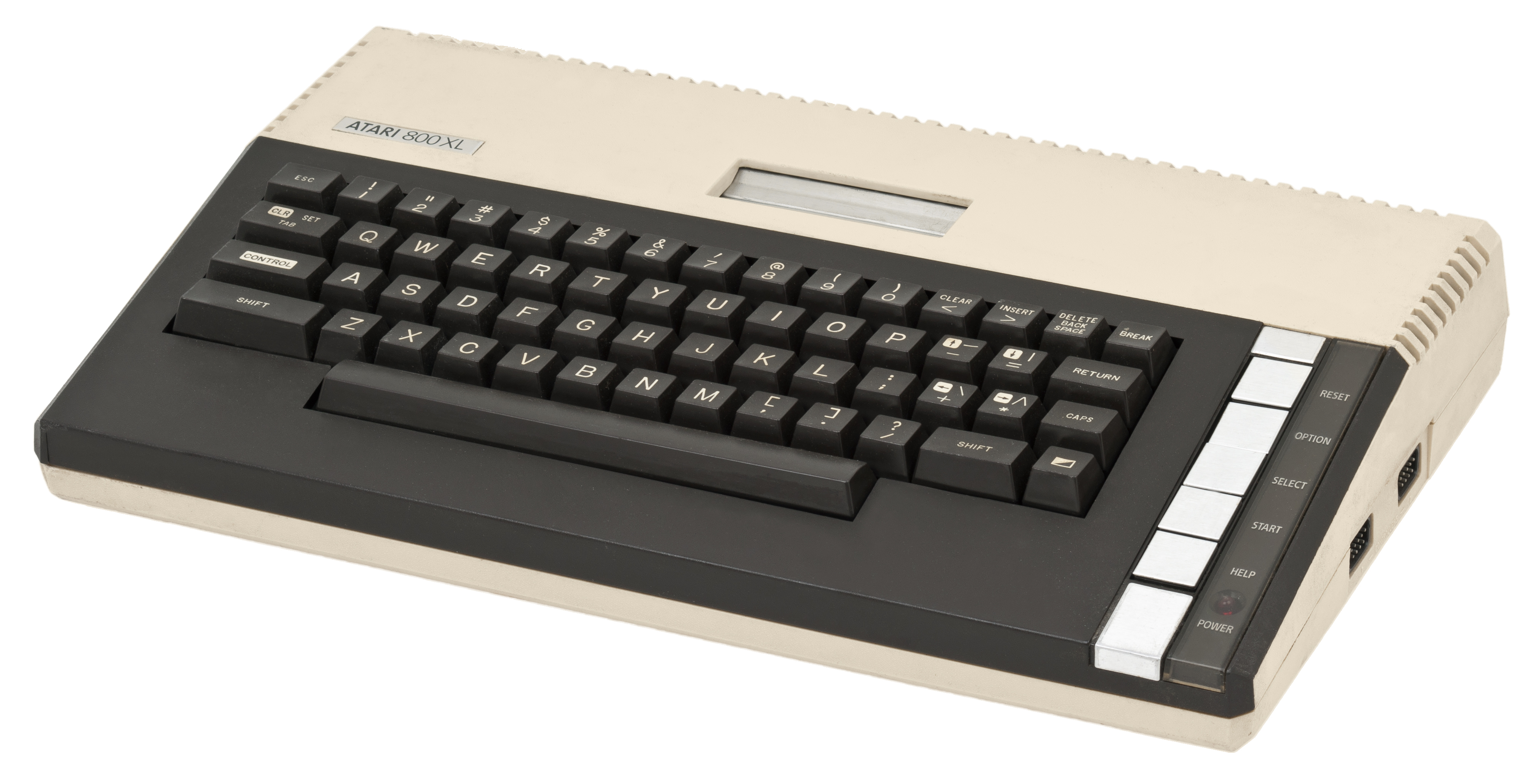
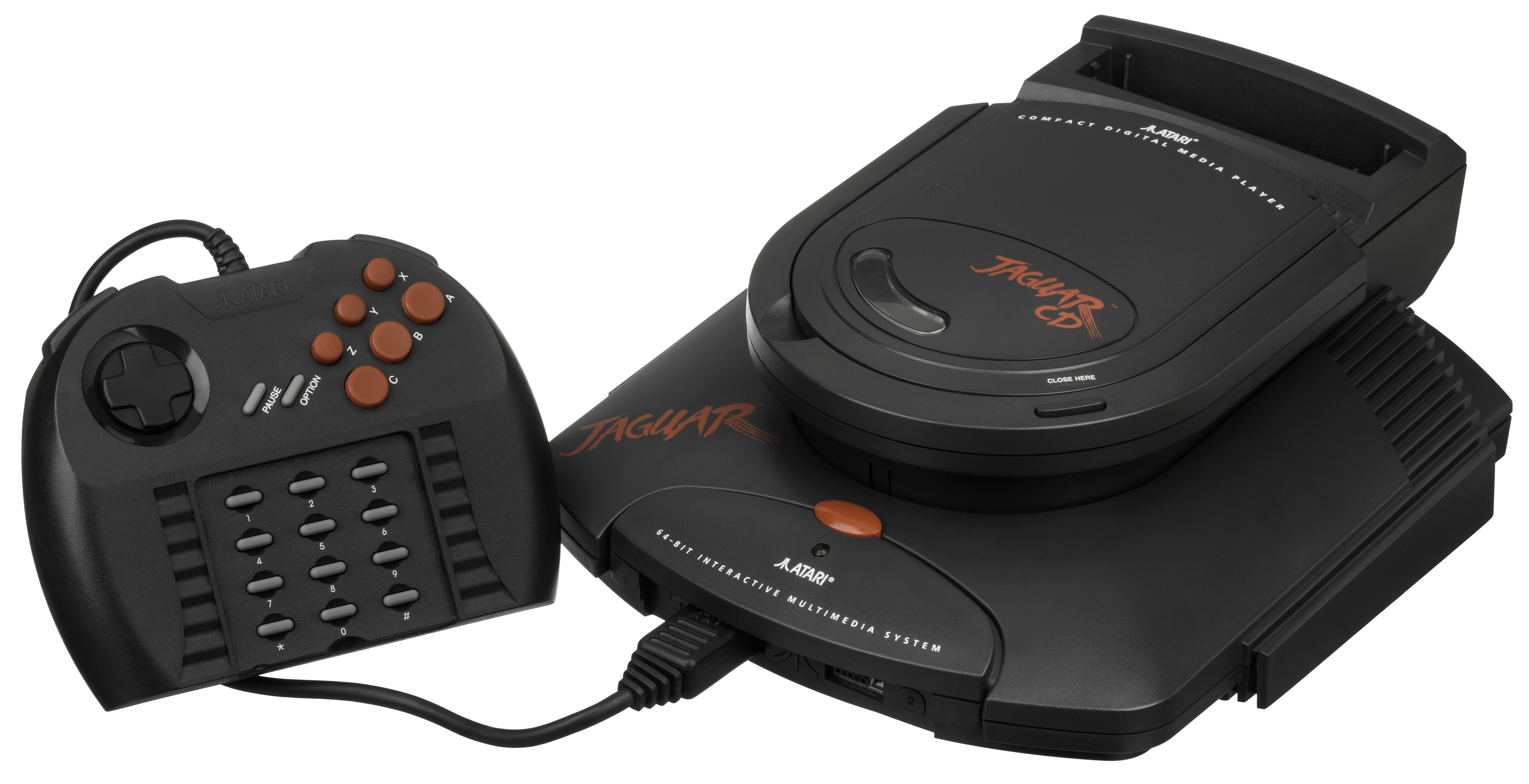
The Assassin had its origins on the Atari 8-bit computers, but was later translated to the Atari Jaguar CD (pictured right attached with the Jaguar) due to technical issues with the development equipment for the 800XL (pictured left), when the game's author moved from US to Japan.

James Garvin, an avid video game player and writer had aspirations of entering into the video game industry, while attending his computer engineering studies at The University of Texas at Austin. James began programming in 1982 with TI-BASIC on the TI-99/4A but he then moved on to both Commodore BASIC and Atari BASIC with the 800XL in 1983, and he was later encouraged to become a full-time programmer by learning the Assembly programming language. Some of his inspirations include Paul Murray, Philip Price and Richard Garriott, in addition of being a fan of Atari during his adolescence.

The Assassin originally started as a game intended for the Atari 8-bit computers, but was later moved to the Atari Jaguar after James came across with technical issues when trying to make his development equipment for the 8-bit computer when moving from USA to Japan. He pitched his project to Atari Corporation but was met with a negative reception from the company, changing his overall outlook about Atari. When Atari Corp. merged with JT Storage in a reverse takeover in April 1996, James became an official developer for the Jaguar and received development materials to program games for it. In 1998, OMC Games announced the game to be in production along with two other projects intended for the Atari Jaguar CD, but they later reassured that it would still be released for the Atari 8-bit computers after Hasbro Interactive released the patents and rights to the Jaguar into public domain in 1999 by declaring it as an open platform and opening the doors for homebrew development, allowing independent publisher and developers to release unfinished titles from the system's past life cycle as well as new titles.

In an article written by Eric C. Mylonas on "The Graveyard" section featured in the November 1999 issue of GameFan magazine, he teased the possibility on covering The Assassin, if reception of the issue was positive enough. Despite multiple promises by the developer to deliver the game after various delays due to multiple internal issues within the group, they ultimately ceased its development and left the project unfinished as a result. There were also graphics created by the game's artist that went unused as well.

== Release ==
Although The Assassin was left unfinished, OMC Games released two ROM image demos in 1999 to the public for free to be downloaded and played on the Atari Jaguar with either a Skunkboard flash cartridge or a modified system with the BJL homebrew program loader installed, in addition of emulators that support the Jaguar, among other ways to play it. Richard Turner, owner of the JustClaws website, demonstrated one of the demos of the game during E-JagFest 2000.

== Legacy ==
The Assassin was part of one of the many projects in development by OMC Games for the Atari Jaguar platform and possibly for other systems, as the company had four more titles planned to be released; a sequel to the game titled Orb Of Bengazi, a medieval fantasy action role-playing game called Age Of Darkness, a cyberpunk title similar in gameplay to Ys I & II named Eternal Darkness: Scent Of the Spider, and a shooter game influenced by Ambrosia Software's 1996 space trading and combat simulator Escape Velocity and Treasure's 1998 shoot 'em up Radiant Silvergun titled Dark Guardian Episode 1: Unknown Enemy. Neither project moved beyond the conceptual design phase except Dark Guardian Episode 1, which had an early demo showcased to the public at JagFest 2K1, a small festival dedicated to the system held in Milwaukee, Wisconsin.
