= AssassiNation =

Studio album by Krisiun
- Released: 21 February 2006
- Genre: Death metal
- Length: 46:29
- Label: Century Media
- Producer: Andy Classen

Krisiun chronology
Bloodshed (2004)	AssassiNation (2006)	Southern Storm (2008)

Professional ratings
Review scores
Source	Rating
AllMusic	3.5/5 stars
Blabbermouth.net	8.5/10 stars

AssassiNation is the sixth album by Brazilian death metal band Krisiun, released in 2006 on Century Media. The album features 12 tracks and two extra bonus tracks. It is dedicated In Memory of Doc and Dimebag.

== Track listing ==
No.	Title	Length
1.	"Bloodcraft"	5:49
2.	"Natural Genocide"	4:29
3.	"Vicious Wrath"	3:54
4.	"Refusal"	4:49
5.	"H.O.G. (House of God)"	3:21
6.	"Father's Perversion"	4:49
7.	"Suicidal Savagery"	4:23
8.	"Doomed"	1:00
9.	"United in Deception"	4:52
10.	"Decimated"	4:08
11.	"Summon"	0:49
12.	"Sweet Revenge" (Motörhead cover)	4:04
Total length:		46:29

Bonus tracks
No.	Title	Length
13.	"Slain Fate" (live)	3:31
14.	"Conquerors of Armageddon" (live)	7:04

== Credits ==
- Alex Camargo – bass, vocals
- Moyses Kolesne – guitar
- Max Kolesne – drums
- Andy Classen – producer
- Jacek Wiśniewski – cover art
