= Red Book (C&S) =

Tabletop role-playing game

Chivalry & Sorcery
- Designers: Edward E. Simbalist, Wilf K. Backhaus
- Publishers: Gamestuff Inc
- Publication: 2000, Red Book (Gamestuff); 2009, Red Book Phoenix edition 2011, Red Book Chimera edition 2012, Red Book Gorgon edition 2013, Red Book Manticore edition 2014, Red Book Hydra edition 2015, Red Book fork Troll-Head; 2016, Red Book Minotaur edition
- Genres: Fantasy
- Systems: Custom

The Red Book is a trademark of Gamestuff Inc and an unauthorized edition of Chivalry & Sorcery (C&S) role playing game. Its name comes from the red cover of the official first edition. All successive Red Book editions took the same design. Editions of Red Book after the first are named in addition to numbered: Phoenix (2nd), Chimera (3rd), Gorgon (4th), Manticore (5th), Hydra (6th) and Minotaur (7th). Red Book preserves the cover and typeface of the first edition of C&S. C&S was originally created in 1977 by two Canadian game designers, Edward E. Simbalist and Wilf K. Backhaus, and first published by Fantasy Games Unlimited (FGU), an American press. The second edition was also published by FGU (1983), the third by Highlander Designs (1996), the fourth (2000) and the fifth (2020) by Britannia Game Designs, an English editor.

== C&S: the Red Book ==
Published in 2000 by Wilf Backhaus and Hugh Tyreman. This free download pdf was published by Gamestuff Inc, a gaming company based in Camrose, Alberta. C&S Red Book was a reprinting of the original 1977 edition of C&S with a larger typeface size and some minor additions. It was produced under license from Wilf K. Backhaus, Maple Leaf Games Ltd (the game company of Ed. Simbalist who died in March 2005), and Britannia Game Designs Ltd (BGD) by Gamestuff Inc. At that time Simbalist and Backhaus officially parted, since Wilf Backhaus did not take part in the writing of C&S4: the Rebirth. This edition is the only authorized version, even if its legality seems to be in question. All successive versions are unlicensed and have the same cover as the first edition published by FGU in 1977. Nonetheless, the Red Book has been continuously updated by fans over the years and is available as a pdf.

== C&S Red Book 2: Phoenix ==
Published in 2009, this version appears to be based on Red Book. The work contains many unlicensed references to Middle Earth's Tolkien universe and it restores the Black Magick spells that disappeared since the third edition. The cover is a copy of the original first edition cover art.

Changes made from the original C&S Red Book:

- three new classes (Spy, Inquisitor, Dark Knight)
- new clerical fighting orders
- plagues & diseases
- new weapons for monsters
- new drugs & poisons
- the Inquisition
- the Opus Dei
- Druidism
- Druidic cults & Deities
- Elves, Dwarves & Hobbits lifestyles
- new spells & Black Magick
- the magicians part 3
- new magic weapons & armors
- new magic items
- extended monsters descriptions
- new monsters
- designing monsters
- Archaeron

== C&S Red Book 3: Chimera ==
In 2011, another edition of 338 pages was released as a free downloadable pdf. This version contains the last writings of Wilf Backhaus, who died in October 2009 and the full supplement "Arden", one of the nations in the Archaeron campaign of the designers of Chivalry & Sorcery that was first published by FGU in 1979. This edition kept the original game's mechanics, but focused on background material such as Demonology. At that time, an official fifth edition was still in development. When C&S Chimera was issued, BDG attempted to protect its trademarks.

Changes made from C&S RB Phoenix:

- new elven races (Noldor: High Elves, Sindar: Grey Elves and Nandor: Wood Elves)
- 2 new religions: paganism and wotanism
- the place of women in the feudal society
- the free companies
- the exorcist, new character class
- the saints
- churches of Evil for Dark Knights
- the Summoner, a new type of magician
- occult books
- backfire table
- symbols of guard
- circles of power and summoning
- spells of summoning
- Demonology: infernal origin, hierarchy in hell, the Watchers, possessions, Cardinal pacts
- Angelology: angelic hierarchy, angelic appearance, archangels, powers of angels
- the medieval cities
- new monsters
- the full supplement of Arden with original maps

== C&S Red Book 4: Gorgon ==
One year after the release of C&S, a new version of 489 pages was launched on the internet as a free downloadable pdf. This version was named C&S Red Book fourth to avoid confusion with the (then) future official fifth edition. This edition kept the original game's mechanic and contains old/unpublished writings and articles of Ed. Simbalist, who died in March 2005, and Wes Ives, a major contributor to the first edition of C&S. The full supplement "Saurians", the world of intelligent dinosaurs that was published by FGU in 1979, had been included in the appendix.

Changes made from C&S RB Chimera:

- the Nephilims: a new race
- skills
- the medieval castle
- crimes & punishments
- torture during the Middle Ages
- the Herald
- Fighting orders organization
- a Warrior Monk Day Planner
- Holy relics
- The Blessings of the Valar
- Ogham
- White Magick
- Witchcraft Organisation
- Demon weapons & Demon armors
- creating a medieval world
- customs of feudal society
- playing evil
- the full supplement Saurians

== C&S Red Book 5: Manticore ==
In June 2013, a new 666-page version was released as a free downloadable pdf. Like the official second edition boxed set of Chivalry & Sorcery published by FGU, this version is divided into three core rulebooks, followed by appendices.

- Book 1 discusses character creation, skills, virtues and flaws, experience and advancement.
- Book 2 discusses combat, feudal age, tournaments, castles, warfare and monsters.
- Book 3 discusses magick, magical combat, demons, angels and the pantheon of Middle-earth (unlicensed by the Tolkien Estate).

The appendices contain expansions, modules and supplements published by FGU. Despite the fact that all Red Book editions bear the logo of FGU, Scott Bizar, the CEO of the company, claims he has nothing to do with them, and since Backhaus' death in 2009, the editors remain anonymous. A group calling itself the "Loyal Order of Chivalry & Sorcery Revival Team" began making announcements on behalf of Red Book editors. Originally Wilf Backhaus founded the LOCS in September 1996 as a means of keeping alive interest in C&S.

Changes made from C&S RB Gorgon:

- a new race: the Half-Elven
- the Nordic Barbarians
- Paladins & Dark Knights
- the agricultural year
- heraldry for monsters
- seals
- army organisation
- how to play a vampire
- the Nordic magick users
- the ancient runes
- new spells
- The DragonLord and The Songsmith: 2 modules for C&S

== C&S Red Book 6: Hydra ==
Published in May 2014, this new version of 864 pages was released on the internet and is divided into nine books: This version contains two extensions that were advertised a long time ago by FGU but never published: "Crusaders", a supplement covering the time of the Crusades in the Holy Land; and "King Arthur", the mythic England of Arthurian legends. The writings of Isaac Bonewits about the C&S magick system were also included.

Hydra was organized in nine books.

- book 1: the great campaign (180 pages)
- book 2: the book of chivalry (158 pages)
- book 3: the book of sorcery (146 pages)
- book 4: warfare (34 pages)
- book 5: crusaders (80 pages)
- book 6: King Arthur (86 pages)
- book 7: Saurians (66 pages)
- book 8: the campaign book (80 pages)
- book 9: the appendices (22 pages)

== C&S: World of the Troll-Head ==
In August 2015, a new variant of the original C&S Red Book was made available. This edition of 235 pages was an adaptation of OC&S1 and OC&S2 with a few clarifications, expansions and house rules. The book provided rules for creating characters in the feudal realms of the Troll Head: a vast continent where many different cultures live. Unlike previous editors of the Red Book, the World of the Troll-Head authors Jean-Marc Pinaud and Guy-Franck Richard did not remain anonymous. Their version was made available for download on the website associated with their online campaign Galapiat.

== C&S Red Book 7: Minotaur ==
One year after the release of C&S Troll-Head, a new Red Book version called Minotaur was published online as a free downloadable pdf. This edition totalled 964 pages divided into 11 chapters:

- book 1: the great campaign (160 pages)
- book 2: those who pray (90 pages) - NEW -
- book 3: the book of chivalry (98 pages)
- book 4: the book of sorcery (126 pages)
- book 5: Creatures Bestiary (86 pages) - NEW -
- book 6: warfare (36 pages)
- book 7: crusaders (100 pages)
- book 8: King Arthur (86 pages)
- book 9: Saurians (66 pages)
- book 10: the campaign book (80 pages)
- book 11: the appendices (22 pages)
