= Wes Ives =

American game designer

Wesley D. Ives
- Occupations: Game designer, Computer technician

Wesley D. Ives, also known as Wes Ives, was an American game designer. Ives was a major contributor of the Chivalry & Sorcery role-playing game and produced games for Fantasy Games Unlimited. He also wrote for the Alarums & Excursions and Dragon magazines. He is credited with first suggesting a version of the "Ability check", which later became the core mechanic of Dungeons & Dragons.

== Career ==
Ives was a major contributor to the Chivalry & Sorcery role-playing game, and wrote one of its most popular supplements. His supplement Destrier was described by Campaign 93 as "comprehensive, very manageable, and quite fair". He produced five games for Fantasy Games Unlimited, an american publishing house for role-playing games and contribute to Thieves' World Complete Sanctuary Adventure Pack from Chaosium, one of the publisher's bestselling game supplements.

During his short game designer life he also wrote articles for Alarums & Excursions, Dragon, and The Strategic Review magazines. In 1976, he wrote "How to Use Non-Prime Abilities" for the first issue of Dragon. This was about character attributes (known as "Abilities" in Dungeons & Dragons) and was the first time a designer proposed rolling an "Ability check". A modified version of this rule later became the core mechanic of Dungeons & Dragons.

Edward E. Simbalist intended to produce a series called the Compleat Role-Player's Handbook, the first book of which was meant to be available at Gen Con 1979, writing it with Ives and Wilf Backhaus, but no installments of the Handbook series were ever produced.

He worked as a computer technician for a school system in Swansea, South Carolina. He died from a flu in 1995.

== Books written or co-authored by Wes Ives ==
- Destrier (Chivalry & Sorcery) (1978), Fantasy Games Unlimited
- Swords & Sorcerers (Chivalry & Sorcery) (1978), Fantasy Games Unlimited
- Saurians (Chivalry & Sorcery) (1979), Fantasy Games Unlimited
- Chivalry & Sorcery Sourcebook (1981), Fantasy Games Unlimited
- Thieves' World (1981), Chaosium
- Chivalry & Sorcery Sourcebook 2 (1983), Fantasy Games Unlimited
