= A. Mark Ratner =

American roleplaying game designer

- Born: New Jersey, United States
- Occupations: Writer, game designer, college professor
- Writing career
- Genre: Wargames

A. Mark Ratner is an American game designer, notable for his work on Space Marines and Space Opera.

== Early life ==
Ratner lived in New Jersey until he joined the Army in 1972. His degrees include Bachelor of engineering, Master of Engineering in mechanical engineering, Master of Science in civil engineering, and a PhD in civil/structural engineering.

== Career ==
Dissatisfaction with existing games, such as Star Guard and Traveller, his military experience led Ratner to create of Space Marines. In 1977 Ratner formed FanTac Games primarily to market Space Marines. FanTac published three titles; Space Marines (a science-fiction wargame), Gi'ac My (a Vietnam wargame), and Orbit War (an interplanetary combat wargame). He was the author of Space Marines and collaborated with Fitzhugh MacCrae and Bruce Lutz on Gi'ac My. He met Scott Bizar, the founder of Fantasy Games Unlimited, at Gen Con in 1977, and that meeting eventually led to the sale of the rights for Space Marines to FGU. After selling rights to FGU, Mark wrote a second edition of Space Marines.

Scott Bizar wanted to produce a science-fiction role-playing game, and asked Edward E. Simbalist, Phil McGregor, and Ratner to develop it. Prior to publication the three had never met and the development was done by correspondence. However, the collaboration with Ratner turned out to be mostly Simbalist drawing on the material in Space Marines. While Ratner was listed as an author for Space Opera and the related supplement Ground & Air Equipment, he had very little input into the final product and seriously considered asking for his name to be removed from Space Opera entirely.

Ratner spent much of the 1980s as a college professor.

== Publications ==
- Space Marines. FanTac Games, 1977.
- Gi'ac My. FanTac Games, 1978.
- Space Marines 2nd edition. Fantasy Games Unlimited, 1979.
- Space Opera. Fantasy Games Unlimited, 1980.
- Ground & Air Equipment. Fantasy Games Unlimited, 1981.
- Star Sector Atlas 6 The Invincible Realm of Hissss'tah. Fantasy Games Unlimited, 2018.
