= Probe NCG 8436 =

Role-playing game supplement

Probe NCG 8436 is a 1981 role-playing game adventure for Space Opera published by Fantasy Games Unlimited.

== Contents ==
Probe NCG 8436 is an adventure involving a survey mission that has been sent to a distant uncharted system in the Procyon subsector.

== Reception ==
William A. Barton reviewed Probe NCG 8436 in The Space Gamer No. 48. Barton commented that "Overall [...] Probe NCG 8436 has enough potential to provide some intriguing adventure sessions for Space Opera play. While not as exciting an adventure as the recent Alien Base, it is far superior to the earlier Martigan Belt."
