= Chivalry & Sorcery Sourcebook 2 =

Fantasy role-playing game supplement

Chivalry & Sorcery Sourcebook 2 is a supplement published by Fantasy Games Unlimited in 1981 for the fantasy role-playing game Chivalry & Sorcery.

== Contents ==
Chivalry & Sorcery Sourcebook 2 is a 52-page softcover book that is divided into five sections:

1. Doors, locks and methods for breaking or picking them.
2. Blacksmiths, weapons and armor, both magical and non-magical
3. Spells available to non-player character mages based on their vocation
4. Forty magic items
5. Strategic combat and naval combat system

== Publication history ==
After the publication of the first fantasy role-playing game, Dungeons & Dragons in 1974, many rival game systems soon appeared in the market, including Tunnels & Trolls, White Bear and Red Moon, and in 1977, FGU's complex Chivalry & Sorcery. The following year, FGU followed up with Chivalry & Sorcery Sourcebook. This was followed by Chivalry & Sorcery Sourcebook 2 in 1981, a 52-page softcover book designed by Wes Ives, Phillip McGregor, and Edward E. Simbalist, with cover art by Bob Charrette, and interior art by Mike Gilbert.

== Reception ==
In Issue 48 of The Space Gamer Ronald Pehr commented "Any dissatisfaction with Sourcebook 2 is a mere quibble. If you play C&S, Sourcebook 2 will markedly enhance your game. If you don't, it has limited utility."

In Issue 22 of Different Worlds, Patrick Amory noted "The Sourcebook 2 is, unlike the Sourcebook, of use only to C&S GMs, to whom it could prove very useful despite its relatively steep price [...] I have found it very handy, but its predecessor is far superior."

In Issue 26 of Abyss, Eric Olson especially liked the sections on locks and strategic mass combat. Olson concluded, "Standing on its own, the book is very useful. If you have C&S it can really be valuable."
