= Rapier & Dagger =

Board game

Rapier & Dagger is a set of rules for a pencil-and-paper fencing duel or fencing using miniatures, published by Fantasy Games Unlimited (FGU) in 1978.

== Publication history ==
In 1976, Wilf Backhaus and Edward E. Simbalist created the fantasy role-playing game Chivalry & Sorcery (C&S), published by FGU. Backhaus and Simbalist subsequently published several supplements for C&S, but Rapier & Dagger, published in 1978, was not one of them. This 24-page booklet, written by Backhaus and illustrated by Simbalist, was instead a treatise on the history of fencing, and a set of generic rules by which two players could engage in a role-playing duel.

The setting of Rapier & Dagger and the fencing styles used relate to France in the 1600s. There are two sets of rules: simpler rules for pencil-and-paper duels; and a more complex set of rules for use with either 25mm or 54 mm miniatures.

== Gameplay ==
Rapier & Dagger is a combat rule system which could be played as a skirmish wargame, or combined with fantasy role-playing game systems.

As a first step, players create a duellist with abilities generated using random dice rolls.

Because the rules system is generic, Rapier & Dagger can be used with any fantasy role-playing system.

== Reception ==
In the February–March 1979 edition of White Dwarf #12, Don Turnbull liked the production value of the booklet, calling it "handsome." However, he found even the simple rules for pencil-and-paper dules "quite complicated", and noted that with beginning players, "duels may take some time to resolve... Even for those to whom rule-reading and comprehension are second nature, these rules are not easy to digest and assemble into a coherent whole." He recommended that players try the simpler pencil-and-paper rules before graduating to the more complex miniatures rules. Once he learned the rules, Turnbull found the action quite realistice, moreso than another FGU duelling game, En Garde!. He gave the game a rating of 6 out of 10, concluding, "The rules are readily adaptable into existing games such as En Garde, Chivalry & Sorcery or even D&D if you want to make melee more realistic between opponents using swords. I suspect, however, they will be used more often on their own – and they provide the basis for some entertaining and thought-provoking duels. Recommended."
