= Star Sector Atlas 5: The United Ranan Worlds =

Star Sector Atlas 5: The United Ranan Worlds is a 1985 role-playing game supplement published by Fantasy Games Unlimited for Space Opera.

== Contents ==
StarSector Atlas 5: The United Ranan Worlds is a supplement in which a campaign setting outlines the worlds and culture of the Ranan.

== Publication history ==
StarSector Atlas 5: United Ranan Worlds was written by Ken Campbell and Edward E. Simbalist with art by Liz Danforth and published by Fantasy Games Unlimited in 1985 as a 64-page book.

== Reviews ==
- Abyss #38 (Summer, 1986)
