= Seldon's Compendium of Starcraft 2 =

Tabletop role-playing game supplement

Seldon's Compendium of Starcraft 2, subtitled "Starships of War", is a supplement published by Fantasy Games Unlimited (FGU) in 1984 for the science fiction role-playing game Space Opera.

== Contents ==
Seldon's Compendium of Starcraft 2 is a sourcebook that presents 33 warships used by four different interstellar powers. Deck plans are provided for the smaller ships.

== Publication history ==
FGU published Space Opera in 1980, and supported it with over twenty supplements and adventures. One of these was Seldon's Compendium of Starcraft 1 (1981). FGU published the sequel, Seldon's Compendium of Starcraft 2 in 1984, a 48-page stapled booklet written by Edward E. Simbalist and Robert N. Charrette, with illustrations by Steve Crompton.

== Reception ==
In Issue 20 of Imagine (November 1984), Stephen Nutt found the entire book less than useful, pointing out the scale used for the deck plans of the smaller ships prevented them from being adequately enlarged in order to be used with 25 mm miniatures. And he found the larger ships were entirely too large to be useful in a role-playing context. He concluded, "As a result, the supplement is useless."
