= Bireme and Galley: Naval Warfare, Egypt to Lepanto =

Role-playing game supplement

Bireme and Galley: Naval Warfare, Egypt to Lepanto is a 1978 role-playing supplement for Chivalry & Sorcery published by Fantasy Games Unlimited.

== Contents ==
Bireme and Galley: Naval Warfare, Egypt to Lepanto is a supplement in which a set of miniature wargame rules represent ancient, medieval and Renaissance warship fleet battles.

== Publication history ==
Bireme & Galley was written by Jan Vrapcenak, Edward E. Simbalist, and Terry Cheesman, and was published by Fantasy Games Unlimited in 1978 as a 104-page book with 10 cardstock sheets and a clear plastic overlay.

Shannon Appelcline noted that "From 1977-1979 C&S was supplemented by more than half-a-dozen books. The game innately appealed only to a very sophisticated group of the most serious roleplayers but amongst these players several of the supplements were quite well-received, including Bireme & Galley (1978) - which contained naval combat rules - and Swords & Sorcerers (1978) - which contained rules for the Norse, Picts, Gaels, Britons and Mongols."

== Reception ==
Ken Rolston reviewed Sea-Steeds and Wave Riders and Bireme and Galley: Naval Warfare, Egypt to Lepanto in White Wolf #39 (1994) and stated that "In general, I appreciate the historical detail and wider range of vessels described in Bireme and Galley, but I prefer the deck plans and roleplaying bias of Sea Steeds and Wave Riders. Either serves as a handy reference to ship design for FRP gamers, but if you can only have one, Sea Steeds and Wave Riders is the most useful."

== Reviews ==
- Trollcrusher (Issue 22 - 1980)
- Recreational Computing
