= Edward E. Simbalist =

Canadian role-playing game designer

Edward E Simbalist
- Born: 5 September 1943 Canada
- Died: 12 March 2005 (aged 61) Edmonton, Alberta, Canada
- Occupation: Game designer, teacher
- Period: 1972–2005
- Genre: Role-playing games, fantasy, wargames

Edward E. Simbalist (5 September 1943 – 12 March 2005) was a Canadian role-playing game designer and high school teacher. He is best known for co-designing Chivalry & Sorcery and Space Opera.

Edward E. Simbalist and Wilf K. Backhaus brought a prototype of Chivalry & Sorcery to Gen Con IX in 1976 with hopes to sell it to TSR. After witnessing Gary Gygax berating a staff member, Simbalist decided not to approach him about the game. Instead, at the same convention, the pair met Scott Bizar of Fantasy Games Unlimited, who published the game over the following year. A few years later Bizar commissioned Simbalist and Phil McGregor to design a science-fiction role-playing game, which was published in 1980 as Space Opera. Simbalist supervised both of these role-playing game lines until FGU ceased to release new products. The last edition of one of his games to appear during his lifetime was Chivalry & Sorcery Light in 2001.

Simbalist lived in Edmonton and taught at Edith Rodgers junior high school.

== Selected works ==
- Chevalier (1976), self-publisher
- Chivalry & Sorcery (1977), Fantasy Games Unlimited
- Bireme and Galley: Naval Warfare, Egypt to Lepanto (Chivalry & Sorcery) (1978), Fantasy Games Unlimited
- Chivalry & Sorcery Sourcebook (1978), Fantasy Games Unlimited
- Destrier (Chivalry & Sorcery) (1978), Fantasy Games Unlimited
- Swords & Sorcerers (Chivalry & Sorcery) (1978), Fantasy Games Unlimited
- Arden (Chivalry & Sorcery) (1979), Fantasy Games Unlimited
- Saurians (Chivalry & Sorcery) (1979), Fantasy Games Unlimited
- Space Opera (1980), Fantasy Games Unlimited
- Chivalry & Sorcery Sourcebook 2 (1981), Fantasy Games Unlimited
- Ground & Air Equipment (Space Opera) (1981), Fantasy Games Unlimited
- Seldon's Compendium of Starcraft 1 (Space Opera) (1981), Fantasy Games Unlimited
- Star Sector Atlas 1: the Terran Sector (Space Opera) (1981), Fantasy Games Unlimited
- Star Sector Atlas 2: The Mercantile League (Space Opera) (1982), Fantasy Games Unlimited
- Chivalry & Sorcery 2nd edition (1983), Fantasy Games Unlimited
- Chivalry & Sorcery Sourcebook 1 & 2, 2nd Ed. (1983), Fantasy Games Unlimited
- Swords & Sorcerers, 2nd Ed. (Chivalry & Sorcery) (1983), Fantasy Games Unlimited
- Seldon's Compendium of Starcraft 2 (Space Opera) (1984), Fantasy Games Unlimited
- Star Sector, Atlas 3 (Space Opera) (1984), Fantasy Games Unlimited
- Star Sector, Atlas 5 (Space Opera) (1985), Fantasy Games Unlimited
- Seldon's Compendium of Starcraft 3 (Space Opera) (1988), Fantasy Games Unlimited
- Chivalry & Sorcery 3rd edition (1996), Highlander Designs
- Creatures Bestiary (Chivalry & Sorcery) (1997), Highlander Designs
- Game Master's Handbook (Chivalry & Sorcery) (1997), Highlander Designs
- Armourers' Companion (Chivalry & Sorcery) (1999), Britannia Game Designs Ltd
- Chivalry & Sorcery Light (1999), Britannia Game Designs Ltd
- Knights' Companion (Chivalry & Sorcery) (1999), Britannia Game Designs Ltd
- Chivalry & Sorcery: The Rebirth (4th edition - 2000), Britannia Game Designs Ltd
- Chivalry & Sorcery Red Book (2000), GameStuff Inc., free download pdf
- Chivalry & Sorcery Light (2001), Brittannia Game Designs & Maple Leaf Games
- Game Master's Toolkit Volume 1 (Chivalry & Sorcery) (2002), Mystic Station Designs
- The Great Cats Book Volume One (SkillSkape) (2003), Mystic Station Designs
- The Creatures Book Volume One (SkillSkape) (2004), Mystic Station Designs
