= Space Opera (role-playing game) =

Tabletop science fiction role-playing game

- Cover of Space Opera Volume 1 manual
- Designers: Edward E. Simbalist, A. Mark Ratner, Phil McGregor
- Publishers: Fantasy Games Unlimited
- Publication: 1980
- Genres: Space opera
- Systems: Custom

Space Opera is a science-fiction role-playing game created by Edward E. Simbalist, A. Mark Ratner, and Phil McGregor in 1980 for Fantasy Games Unlimited (FGU). While the game's system can be used to create any science fiction genre, Space Opera has a default setting focused on creating space opera themed adventures.

== Development ==
According to the Scott Bizar, the founder of FGU, "I wanted a SF rpg and I gave the job to Ed Simbalist. During the process I’ve never met Ed, nor Phil McGregor and Mark Ratner, who lived in the Canadian west, Australia and the east of the USA, respectively. The project was completed over more than two years entirely by correspondence." Simbalist was responsible for all the editing and coordination. Phil McGregor sent some technology and space ship related stuff which Simbalist liked so much that he incorporated it in the finished product. While the background universe was based on Mark Ratner's Space Marines, Ratner had little input into Space Opera itself.

Part of the Volume One introduction by Bizar describes this undertaking:

The original concept was to create a game that would not need the usual innumerable supplements to its rules but that would be a complete science fiction role playing game. Thus, we wanted a game that would allow players to role play all of the most popular roles for a character in the entire genre of science fiction literature. This called for a game to handle the future warrior and mercenary, the free-trader, the asteroid miner, the planetary explorer and first contact man, and the member of the diplomatic corps/spy service. We needed science and the possibility of scientist characters with medicine playing a major role.

As if this weren't enough, the decision was made to base the game on the grand tradition of Space Opera, in the vein of E.E Doc Smith and most recently Star Wars from George Lucas. This meant that we would also have to allow for the psionic powers so prevalent in the Lensman series and in Star Wars with 'the force.'

— Scott B. Bizar, Space Opera: The complete science fiction role playing game (1980), page ii

== Character creation ==
Character creation in Space Opera takes about an hour to generate an experienced and in-depth character. The number of random rolls is limited, but the player has discretion in how points are applied and many choices among skills.

Players choose from the following classes: Armsman, Astronaut, Tech (with subclasses such as Armstech or Crimetech), and Scientist (Pure Researcher, Medical Researcher, Physician, & Engineering subclasses). The classes enable bonuses to be applied to personal characteristics and can ease the cost to acquire skills.

Space Opera characters' personal characteristics average out higher than the average person. Players roll a d100 for each of the 14 characteristics. These are Physique, Strength, Constitution, Agility, Dexterity, Empathy, Intelligence, Psionics, Intuition, Bravery, Leadership, General Technical Aptitude (GTA), Mechanical Aptitude, and Electronics Aptitude. Bonus points based on class can be applied to these rolls. Players compare the final number with a scaled table resulting in a number between 1 and 19 for each characteristic. Players make Characteristic Rolls (CRs) on a d20 during play.

Planet of Birth is made up of three rolls for Gravity, Atmosphere, and Climate. These can affect on Personal Characteristics choice of race.

Player characters can belong to any of the following races: Human, Humanoid, Transhuman, Pithecine, Canine, Feline, Ursoid, Avian, and Warm-blooded Saurian. Some of the races have characteristic prerequisites.

Other capabilities, such as Carrying Capacity, Damage Factor, and Stamina (based on Personal Characteristics) help to further define the character.

In the Career path the character goes through the recruitment process, participates for a random number of tours-of-duty, has opportunities for promotion, and finally musters out, in some cases with severance pay, pension benefits, savings, and personal gear.

Finally, the player calculates the number of skill points available, chooses skills, and allocates points to those skills.

== Races ==
Space Opera races are treated generally. Instead of assigning a unique name to a race, the game names them anthropomorphically. This allows any fictional race to be simulated.

Player character races:

- Avian: Anthropomorphic bird races.
- Canine: Anthropomorphic canine races.
- Feline: Anthropomorphic felines come in two general strains: Mekpurr, the smaller and more technically adept and Avatar, larger, hunting cat varieties. Example: Kzinti
- Humans: These include current Earth homo sapiens as well as all well-known biologically similar Science Fiction races. Example: Fremen
- Humanoids: Representative of human races who evolved away from the basic racial stock due to evolutionary adaptations to the local environment, and are generally not genetically compatible with Humans. Arrangement and even functions of internal organs differ. They may have adaptive extra organs, such as Desert planet humanoid's nictitating membranes and Olfactory organs more sensitive (similar to sharks and blood) to water.
- Pithecine: Anthropomorphic primate races resembling gorillas and the like, tending to be more emotional and more easily excited. Example: Planet of the Apes
- Saurian: Anthropomorphic warm-blooded dinosaur races. They are a "cold blooded" group only empathically speaking, by human standards, with loyalty to race over family. Example: Gorn
- Transhumans: Any kind of humanoid race which has achieved a greater level of evolution than Humans/Humanoids, more intellectually oriented, and with higher psionic aptitudes. Example: Vulcan
- Ursoids / Blarad: Anthropomorphic bear races. Example: Wookiee
- IRSOL: Technically not a separate race, but any of the above races having fragile, taller and thinner frames for having evolved on low gravity managed atmosphere orbital installations, such as space stations, dome cities on asteroids, or wandering "StarCities."

Non-player character races:
Space Opera also includes a list of races for Non-player Characters and for encounters that consist of some meaningful contact:

- Amoeboids
- Avian/Whistler
- Canine/Rauwoof
- Cold planet beings
- Feline/Avatar
- Feline/MekPurr
- Human
- Humanoid
- Icthyoid/Klackon
- Icthyoid/Mertun
- Insectoid/Arachnoid
- Insectoid/Bug
- Insectoid/Scorpionoid
- Insectoid/Zzz'Kkk
- IRSOL
- Pithecine
- Saurian/Hiss
- Silicates
- Transhuman
- Ursoid/Blarad

== Planet of birth ==
Characters can be born on a planet with any Gravity Field ranging from zero G to 2.5 G. Characters can also be born on a planet with many atmosphere types, ranging from low or no atmosphere in dome cities, to very high pressure atmospheres, with or without some contaminants, or partially exotic constituents. Finally, characters can be born on a planet with many Climate types:

Planetary Type 1:
The planet is at a favorable position in the Stellar Ecosphere. Axial tilt is between 10° and 30°, orbital eccentricity is less than 0.2, and the length of the day is 6-72 hours. All conditions of illumination and heating are Terran normal. In short, the planet exhibits those characteristics of climate and temperature which would make it a veritable “twin” of Terra. Type One planets are highly prized for colonization.

— Space Opera: The complete science fiction role playing game, page 80
- Type 1 Standard Terran Planet
- Type 1 Steppe Planet
- Type 1 Arid Planet
- Type 1 Desert Planet
- Type 1 Swamp Planet
- Type 1 Jungle Planet
- Type 1 Tundra Planet
- Type 1 Ocean Planet
- Type 2 Terran Planet without seasonality
- Type 3 Terran Planet with extreme seasonality
- Type 4 Terran Planet with normal axial tilt at outer edge of stellar ecosphere
- Type 5 Terran Planet with minimal axial tilt at outer edge of stellar ecosphere
- Type 6 Terran Planet with extreme axial tilt at outer edge of stellar ecosphere
- Type 7 Terran Planet with normal axial tilt at inner edge of stellar ecosphere
- Type 8 Terran Planet with minimal axial tilt at inner edge of stellar ecosphere
- Type 9 Terran Planet with extreme axial tilt at inner edge of stellar ecosphere
- Type 10 Terran Planet with eccentric orbit crossing beyond the outer ecosphere
- Type 11 Terran Planet with eccentric orbit crossing beyond the inner ecosphere
- Type 12 Terran Planet with eccentric orbit crossing beyond the inner ecosphere & the outer ecosphere
- Type 13 Terran Planet up to 10% beyond inner ecosphere limit (13/7, 13/8, 13/9)
- Type 14 Terran Planet up to 30% outside stellar ecosphere (14/4, 14/5, 14/6)
- Type 13 Airless/Low pressure, managed domed environment, with moon-like extremes of temperature
- Type 14 Airless/Low pressure, managed domed environment, cold exotic atmosphere
- Type 15 Airless/Low pressure, managed domed environment, close to primary with high radiation
- Type 15 High pressure, managed domed environment, high surface temperatures
- Type 16 Far out from primary, noontime high temperatures -80 °C to -185 °C
- Type 17 Far out from primary, noontime high temperatures -185 °C to -225 °C
- Type 18 Far out from primary, noontime high temperatures -225 °C to -273 °C
- Type 19 Rogue planet, completely frozen
- Type 20 Gas Giants with orbital positions indicated as 20/15, 20/16, 20/17, 20/18, 20/19

Where not noted normal (10° to 30°) axial tilts are assumed, extreme minimums with the suffix -A, extreme maximums with the suffix -B, with the exception of Type 2 and Type 3 which are axial tilt categories.

== Psionics ==
Some characters are able to use Psionics, an advanced science with multiple fields of studies, three levels of functioning (Psionically dead, Psionically open, Psionically Awakened), and multiple skills. Characters who are open and Psionically attacked or have contact with a raw PK Crystal can awaken and learn skills by trial and error. Characters with high Psionic scores might be "contacted" and trained. Psionic fields include:

- Telepathy - 29 skills
- Telekinesis - 25 skills
- Teleportation - 4 skill
- Clairvoyance - 15 skills
- Telurgy & Self-awareness - 12 skills
- The Force - 11 skills

== Technology ==
Space Opera technology mirrors the technology in stories traditional to that genre. Missing are the influences of cyberpunk, mechs, and nanotechnology, which all came later than the publication of the game.

Multi-Computers (500 kg - 50 tons) are based on a monolithic, mainframe-style that are meant to look after a least as many processes as the human brain takes care of for the human body, but for starships or cities. Space Opera also includes Mini-Computers at higher tech levels that are comparable to today's smartphones. A variety of software for computers is available covering "much of the significant knowledge of the race." The higher level Multi-comps (Mk.X to Mk.XIV) are considered sentient with "cybernetic rights."

Many other innovative sci-fi technologies are included, for example: Artificial Gills, Still Suits, medical and anti-aging drugs, Electro-Binoculars (1000 Lightyears range), ECM for communication and sensorscans, belt-size personal force-screen generators, power assisted personal armor, grav/jump belts, robots of every type, laser/blaster guns, laserswords & lightswords, anti-robot positronic brain disruptors (APROBDIF), etc.

== Combat system ==
Combat is generally a four-step process. One first determines if a character scores a hit with his chosen weapon. Things like range, size of the target, movement, and amount of cover come into play. If one scores a hit, then one rolls to determine hit location. After hit location, one then determines if the attack penetrated the armor. Finally, damage is determined. The full range of possible weapons technologies is covered, from the lowest tech level "Atlatl," to the high tech "Anti-Robot Positronic Brain Disruptor (APROBDIF)" guns and screens.

== Official universe ==
While the Space Opera rules can be adapted to any imagined universe, the official universe was based on the nations described in Mark Ratner's Space Marines, and further defined through a series of Star Sector Atlases.

| Star Culture: | Notes / AKA |
|---|---|
| Azuriach Imperium | "Azzis" |
| Blarad: Star Kingdom of the Blarad | Ursoids |
| Bugs | Insectoids |
| Confederate Systems Alliance | |
| Galactic Peoples Republic | "G.P.R." |
| Hissss'ist | Warm-blooded Dinosauroids |
| IRSOL | Nil-Low Gravity Space Dwellers |
| Klackons | Icthyoids |
| Korellian Empire | Six digit Humanoids |
| MekPurr | Feline |
| Mercantile League | |
| Ranan: United Ranan Worlds | "Ranan Horde" |
| Rauwoof Worlds | Canines |
| United Federation of Planets | "UFP" |
| Whistlers | Avian |

== Books ==
| Title | Type | Year | ASIN (Note: What are UPCs, EANs, ISBNs. and ASINs?) |
|---|---|---|---|
| Space Marines | related wargame | 1979 | |
| Space Opera: Volume 1 & 2. | core rules (2 books): Volume 1: character creation, psionics, and starships. Volume 2: equipment, worlds, and aliens. | 1980 | B000721GY0; B0018ZCENM |
| Space Opera: The complete science fiction role playing game. | core rules (1 book, vol. 1 & 2 one binding, 1 cover) | 1982 | B000EOIYLY |
| Ground & Air Equipment | supplement | 1981 | B000G7ST32 |
| Seldon's Compendium of Star Craft 1 - Ship's Boats, Traders, Liners and Patrol Vessels | supplement | 1981 | B000B8AFUQ |
| Seldon's Compendium of Star Craft 2 - Starships of War Azuriach, GPR, Mercantile League and Terran | supplement | 1984 | B000B88PAI |
| Seldon's Compendium of Star Craft 3 - Starships of War Blarad, Mekpurr, Ranan and Hissss'ist | supplement | 1988 | B000B8511Y |
| The Outworlds | supplement | 1981 | |
| Star Sector Atlas 1 - The Terran Sector | supplement | 1981 | B000EOIYRI |
| Star Sector Atlas 2 - The Mercantile League | supplement | 1983 | B000F6MFAM |
| Star Sector Atlas 3 - The Azuriach Imperium | supplement | 1984 | B000FDKZSE |
| Star Sector Atlas 4 - The Galactic People's Republic (G.P.R.) | supplement | 2015 | |
| Star Sector Atlas 5 - The United Ranan Worlds | supplement | 1985 | B0047MTQ2K |
| Star Sector Atlas 6 - The Hisss | supplement | 2018 | |
| Star Sector Atlas 7 - The Blarad Star Kingdom | supplement | 2016 | |
| Star Sector Atlas 11 - The Confederate Systems Alliance | supplement | 1982 | |
| Star Sector Atlas 12 - Korellian Empire | supplement | 1984 | |
| Alien Base | module | 1980 | |
| Martigan Belt - An Adventure in the Asteroids | module | 1981 | |
| Probe NCG 8436 | module | 1981 | |
| Fasolt in Peril - An Anti-Terrorist Adventure | module | 1982 | |
| Rowsion II - A Merchant Service Adventure | module | 1982 | |
| Vault of the Ni'er Queyon | module | 1982 | |
| Incedus III | module | 1982 | |
| Agents of Rebellion | module | 1983 | |
| Casino Galactica - Adventure Setting and Scenarios | module | 1983 | |
| Operation Peregrine - The Quanchiovt Conspiracy | module | 1983 | |

The Space Opera core game consisted of two volumes and four double-sided 8x11" data sheets, in a box. There were three different box covers probably corresponding to three printings, and the two core books were merged into one binding in the last printing, but the contents remained the same throughout.

The supplements Denoba Class Small Merchant and Nike Class Patrol Cruiser were written by Edward E. Simbalist, Robert N. Charrette, and S. R. Greene and published in 1988 by Seeker Gaming Systems.

== Reprints ==
Some components of Space Opera are in print again after a long absence and are available via FGU's online store and the RPG download sites DriveThruRPG and RPGNow.

The rights to the game are jointly held by the authors and Fantasy Games Unlimited, whereas the rights to the title were probably held by FGU solely. The rights to the game were to revert to the authors if the company went out of business. Despite going into dormant periods operating as a company in name only, FGU is still in operation. Ed Simbalist sought to buy the rights from the publisher Scott Bizar, however Bizar's asking price was judged too high.

From a December 2000 interview with Ed Simbalist:

I won't write another version of Space Opera. Scott Bizar owns that property, hasn't done anything much to promote it, hasn't paid royalties that offer any hope that an author will be compensated for his considerable effort, and won't release it back to the authors. I know of the many persona[l] reverses he's experienced, and I doubt that FGU would ever become a viable publishing company in the future. Any revision work on my part would be a waste of time. Similarly, the expense of legally recovering the right to publish Space Opera isn't worth it. Apart from a highly inflated value placed by FGU on the game (actually on the NAME), why would I wish to purchase several thousand copies of a recent reprint that just won't sell in the current market? It makes no sense.

Reportedly the asking price was $100,000, though the authors felt it was only worth $10,000.

== New publications ==
Three new Star Sector Atlases, #4 and #7, and #6 were published in 2014, 2016, and 2018.

== Reception ==
Stefan Jones reviewed Space Opera in The Space Gamer No. 33. Jones commented that "Despite its flaws, I highly recommend Space Opera. This game has the best of the other major SFRPGs on the market and more." Stefan Jones is the author of Outworlds a Space Opera Starsector Atlas.

Eric Goldberg reviewed Space Opera in Ares Magazine #5 and commented that "If only the attention to science fiction in Space Opera could be combined with the smoothness of the Traveller game, sf role-players would not need to look any further."

Andy Slack reviewed Space Opera for White Dwarf #25, giving it an overall rating of 8 out of 10, and stated that "this is an extremely complicated game which will take a very long time to set up properly. It is also unusual for such a detailed game to be 'heroic' rather than 'realistic'. Nonetheless, for someone prepared to spend the time required to do it justice, this could be a rewarding and entertaining game."

William A. Barton reviewed Space Opera, 2nd Ed. in The Space Gamer No. 49. Barton commented that "for those who liked Space Opera originally or for those who thought it had potential but were turned off by the typos, omissions, etc., the 2nd edition is definitely worth having."

In Issue 8 of the French games magazine Casus Belli, Thierry Marin compared this game to the complex and formula-heavy fantasy game Chivalry & Sorcery, calling Space Opera "currently the most complete science fiction role-playing game ever published." Marin noted that this complexity especially was felt during space combat, and recommended that both the gamemaster and the players each have a calculator. Marin concluded with a positive recommendation, saying, "Space Opera is a very complete SF role-playing game; and the simulation is very good. On the other hand, people who fear complicated and sometimes very complex rules may be somewhat put off... but the game is worth it!"

In his 1990 book The Complete Guide to Role-Playing Games, game critic Rick Swan called this game "an unforgiving game system that ... tests a player's tolerance for tables, charts, and formulas ... Though the system produces well-rounded PCs, it's painfully convoluted, a problem that plagues Space Opera throughout. The rules for starship design require a background in physics to appreciate, and the combat rules rival the detail of tactical wargames." Swan found that this complexity and attention to detail brought the game to a snail's pace. "Every part of the game's mechanics is based on complicated routines — a simple scenario can take a weekend to complete." Swan also found that the complex game rules had been overtaken by newer and simpler games, commenting, "The rules are workable, but they're also dated and dry, especially in light of such streamlined, action-intensive games as Star Trek and Star Wars." Swan concluded by giving this game a rating of 2.5 out of 4, saying, "For players with time on their hands who consider Star Trek too childish and Star Wars too simple-minded, Space Opera might be worth a look."

== See also ==
- Fantasy Games Unlimited
- Lists of fictional species
