= Space marine (disambiguation) =

A space marine is a science fiction concept, an analogue for military marines in outer space.

Space Marine or Space Marines may also refer to:

- Space Marine (Warhammer 40,000), a type of soldier in the Warhammer 40,000 universe
  - Warhammer 40,000: Space Marine, a 2011 video game based on the property
  - Warhammer 40,000: Space Marine II a 2024 video game based on the property
  - Space Marine, one of several early versions of the miniatures game now known as Epic
- Space Marines (wargame), a miniatures wargame
- Space Marines (film), a 1996 film
