= Vault of the Ni'er Queyon =

Vault of the Ni'er Queyon is a 1982 role-playing game adventure for Space Opera published by Fantasy Games Unlimited.

== Contents ==
Vault of the Ni'er Queyon is an adventure in which the player characters must find the vault and the treasure within.

== Reception ==
Kenneth Uecker reviewed Vault of the Ni'er Queyon in The Space Gamer No. 52. Uecker commented that "Overall, Vault of the Ni'er Queyon is an excellent adventure, well worth the price. There is a wealth of background data. With a few exceptions, this will be easily adapted to most Space Opera campaigns."

William A. Barton reviewed Vault of the Ni'er Queyon for Different Worlds magazine and stated that "Whether or not one actually wishes to run the adventure as written, Vault of the Ni'er Oueyon could prove useful as a source of ideas and inspiration to almost any Space Opera gamemaster, as well as those of other science-fiction role-playing games."
