= Archaeron =

Archaeron is a role-playing game published by Archaeron Games Ltd. in 1980.

== Description ==
Archaeron is a fantasy system similar to Chivalry & Sorcery, for which only two rulebooks were ever published.

Mage, the first book, is a fantasy magic system with complex rules for spellcasting, creation of magician characters, and various types of magic and spells. There are three types of spellcasters: Psychics (divided into Mediums, Seers, and Natural Psychics); Magic Users (Conjurers, Thaumaturges, and Enchanters); and Theurgists ("cleric" types: Symbolists, Mystics, and Necromancers).

Warrior, the second book, is a fantasy combat system for medieval European-style combat, with rules for creation of warrior characters; detailed weapon skills; melee, missile, and mounted combat; wounds and healing; etc.

== Publication history ==
Archaeron was designed by Wilf K. Backhaus and published by Archaeron Games Ltd. in 1980 as the digest-sized 48-page book Mage. The digest-sized 48-page book Warrior was written by Backhaus with Jan Vrapcenak and Richard Fietz, and published by Archaeron Games Ltd. in 1981.

== Reception ==
Steven List reviewed Archaeron for Different Worlds magazine and stated that "The Archaeron Game System, based on [its first] two modules, seems to have some promise as a source of ideas for character generation and role-playing nuances, but it appears not to be a playable FRP system in its own right. Until more modules and source information is made available, AGS cannot be played on its own, so this judgment is to some extent unfair. However, it is valid to say that these two modules fail in their stated objective of providing improved systems for use in other game rules."
