= The Outworlds: A Starsector Atlas =

Role-playing game supplement

The Outworlds: A Starsector Atlas is a 1981 role-playing game supplement for Space Opera published by Fantasy Games Unlimited.

== Contents ==
The Outworlds: A Starsector Atlas is a supplement presenting a starsector atlas focusing on the Deneb sector.

== Reception ==
William A. Barton reviewed The Outworlds: A Starsector Atlas in The Space Gamer No. 46. Barton commented that "If you don't mind paying for the wasted space and you're a SO player or FM to whom the prospect of adventuring on exotic planets such as New Wyoming or Goshlookout is enticing, you may find some points of interest in The Outworlds."

== See also ==
- Deneb Sector
