= Casino Galactica =

Role-playing game supplement

Cover art by Steve Crompton, 1984

Casino Galactica is a supplement published by Fantasy Games Unlimited (FGU) in 1983 for the science fiction role-playing game Space Opera.

== Contents ==
Casino Galactica provides details of a luxurious tourist resort on Arcturus V, including notable personalities, building blueprints, casino games, random encounter tables, some animals found in the territory surrounding the casino, and the shuttle transportation system connecting the resort to the nearest spaceport. The book does not contain full Space Opera adventures, but does have some ideas for scenarios.

== Publication history ==
FGU published Space Opera in 1980, and supported it with over twenty supplements and adventures. Casino Galactica, released in 1983, is a 20-page book written by Steven B. Todd, with illustrations by Steve Crompton.

== Reception ==
In Issue 20 of Imagine, Stephen Nutt pointed out that the scenario suggestions were no more than frameworks and left a lot of work for the gamemaster. But due to the detailed backgrounds given to the hotel guests and staff, he concluded, "The referee, merely through interaction with the players, should be able to create some quite good situations off-the-cuff. This is useful because most of the situations will be undercover and need to be free form if they are to work."

William A. Barton reviewed Casino Galactica for Different Worlds magazine and stated that "As a rule, I don't like scenario books that are mainly settings with few or no concrete adventure guidelines. However, Casino Galactica has just the right blend of elements to make it the best such scenario setting since FASA's Action Aboard book of adventure aboard the luxury liner King Richard. A must for any nonroutine science-fiction campaign!"
