= Warrior (Archaeron) =

Warrior is a 1981 role-playing game supplement published by Archaeron Games for Archaeron.

== Contents ==
Warrior is a supplement in which player characters are human and ten Primary Characteristics are generated using one six-sided die.

This system for fantasy combat focuses on medieval European-style warfare, featuring rules for creating warrior characters, detailed skills for weapons, rules for melee and ranged combat, as well as mounted combat, how to handle wounds and healing, and more.

== Publication history ==
Warrior was written by Wilf K. Backhaus with Jan Vrapcenak and Richard Fietz and published by Archaeron Games Ltd. in 1981 as a digest-sized 48-page book.

Shannon Appelcline noted that after Wilf Backhaus left Fantasy Games Unlimited, "Backhaus went on to create his own game company, Archaeron Games. Much like Gamelords, ICE, Leading Edge Games, and other publishers of the early '80s, Backhaus kicked off his production with plug-in game systems that could be used with 'generic' fantasy RPGs, but which were intended to eventually form their own complete game system. He only got as far as publishing Mage (1980) and Warrior (1981)."

== Reception ==
Steven List reviewed Warrior for Different Worlds magazine and stated that "Warrior is an interesting set of rules for developing a persona, and as such can be a good FRP aid. As a combat module for use in another game system, it is more trouble than it is worth. Once the rest of the Archaeron Game System is available, it may be better integrated, but for now it is mainly a curiosity."
