= Sea-Steeds and Wave Riders =

1978 role-playing game supplement

- Publisher: Judges Guild
- Publication date: 1978

Sea-Steeds and Wave Riders is a 1978 role-playing game supplement published by Judges Guild.

== Contents ==
Sea-Steeds and Wave Riders is a supplement in which game statistics are presented for more than 20 ancient and medieval vessels.

== Publication history ==
Sea-Steeds and Wave-Riders was written by Dave Sering and published by Judges Guild in 1978 as 32-page book with two large maps.

== Reception ==
Patrick Amory reviewed Sea-Steeds and Wave Riders for Different Worlds magazine and stated that "The maps are well-produced and stand up to a lot of wear. Also included is a long piece on crews, ship-captains, and prices. An invaluable aid for any serious GM."

Ken Rolston reviewed Sea-Steeds and Wave Riders and Bireme and Galley: Naval Warfare, Egypt to Lepanto in White Wolf #39 (1994) and stated that "The real prizes of this publication are the two copies of deck plans printed in a generous 25mm scale on two sides of 22" x 28" hex sheet, on heavy paper stock. The scale is approximately 1" = 5'. The hexes are about 1/2 inch (i.e., representing 1 meter) and of doubtful utility, but these hexes in no way detract from the detail and appeal of the deck plan illustrations."

== Reviews ==
- Dragon #133
