= Middle Sea (game) =

Board game

Middle Sea, subtitled "Empires of the Feudal Age", is a board game published by Fantasy Games Unlimited (FGU) in 1979 that simulates the rise of medieval empires in the Mediterranean basin. The game started as a play by mail game before being converted into a board game.

== Description ==
Middle Sea is a game for 2–12 players set in the Mediterranean circa 1200 where players utilize warfare, navies, economics, and diplomacy to maximize their empire. The map is divided into Christian, Muslim, and pagan provinces, and each province is ruled by a leader who can control a certain number of armies.

=== Components ===
The game box contains:

- 2-piece 64.5 cm x 28 cm mounted map of Mediterranean basin
- 266 die-cut counters
- 384 cards
- 16-page rule booklet

=== Gameplay ===
Each game turn represents one year and is divided into four seasons. In Spring, Summer, and Fall, armies and navies move simultaneously according to written orders; in Winter, players are confined to "at home" activities such as raising funds, and building fortifications.

The purpose of the game is to invade provinces to gain access to more resources as well as the province's leader, who can then lead more armies and navies. Combat can take place on land, and also at sea if two navies occupy meet.

Because of card effects; leadership, fortifications, and ships are facedown. Players can employ spies to try to find out more information about these.

== Publication history ==
Middle Sea was originally a play-by-mail game, and then was converted to a board game by Wilf K. Backhaus and Terence Peter Donnelly, and published by FGU in 1979.

== Reception ==
In Issue 33 of the British magazine Phoenix, Paul King was a bit disappointed in the quality of the components, especially the leader counters, finding that the printing was "not crisp enough for my liking." He also noted that there were no spare blank counters in case a counter was lost and no storage provided for the counters. And King found the map a bit small, considering that it was designed for up to twelve players. Given the quality of the components, King questioned the high price of the game (£13.95 in 1980). He noted the game's similarities to Diplomacy, but indicated he preferred the original game. He concluded with some ambivalence, saying, "Overall this is a good multiplayer game; however, at a cost of £13.95 I think the quality of some of the components could be improved."

In Issue 32 of Dragon, James Ward thought that the game "does an excellent job of representing an era which man has been fascinated with since it happened." He thought the components were "first-rate." He concluded that "with a minimum of muss and fuss, one can play a Richard the Lionhearted or a Saladin and have a roaring good time back in an era when kingdoms could be made or broken with the strength of one good sword arm."

In Issue 20 of Abyss (August 1982), Eric Olson thought this was "easy and fun to play" for several reasons: The easy-to-understand rules, the absence of charts and tables, the use of a single die roll to resolve combat, and the presence of both land and sea combat. But Olson suggested the $20 price tag was a barrier. Despite this, Olson concluded, "Middle Sea is the best game I've seen in some time. It is worth the $20 price; probably worth even more ... It reinforces my belief in the quality of FGU products."
