= Star Sector Atlas 2: The Mercantile League =

Tabletop role-playing game supplement

Star Sector Atlas 2: The Mercantile League is a 1982 role-playing game supplement for Space Opera published by Fantasy Games Unlimited.

== Contents ==
Star Sector Atlas 2: The Mercantile League is a supplement that details the Antares Starsector, describing the history of its Mercantile League, as well as the "Codes Duello" which inform the judiciary system of the Mercantile League.

== Reception ==
Jerry Epperson reviewed Star Sector Atlas 2: The Mercantile League in Space Gamer No. 70. Epperson commented that "Giving Star Sector Atlas 2 anything more than a qualified recommendation would be grounds for admission to a rubber room. If you really want someone developing about fifty different stars, dumping them in your lap, and saying something like 'Here you go,' then buy it. It's much better than Star Sector Atlas I. However, if you don't like to play editor before using a supplement of this nature, let it sit on the shelf."
