= Wilf K. Backhaus =

Canadian game designer

Wilf K Backhaus
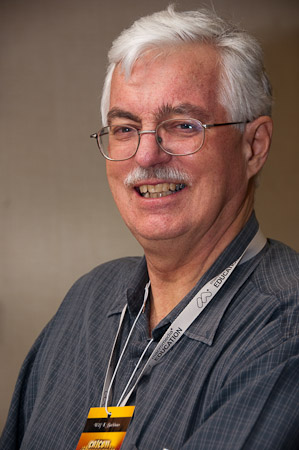
- Backhaus at CalCon 2009
- Born: 7 November 1946; Freckenhorst, Germany
- Died: 14 October 2009 (aged 62); Calgary, Alberta
- Resting place: St. Mary's Cemetery (Calgary, Alberta, Canada)
- Occupations: Writer, game designer, lawyer, business professor
- Writing career
- Period: 1972–2009
- Genres: Role-playing games, fantasy, wargames

Wilfried Karl Backhaus (7 November 1946 – 14 October 2009) was a role-playing game designer, business professor, and lawyer.

== Career ==
Wilf K. Backhaus and Edward E. Simbalist designed a role-playing game called Chevalier, which they brought to Gen Con IX in 1976 with hopes to sell it to TSR; after witnessing Gary Gygax berate a staff member, Simbalist decided not to approach Gygax about the game. At the convention, they met Scott Bizar of Fantasy Games Unlimited, who was interested in the game and helped to get it published over the next year as Chivalry & Sorcery, the first role-playing game from Fantasy Games Unlimited. Published in 1977, Chivalry & Sorcery (C&S) was an early competitor to Dungeons & Dragons. Backhaus and Simbalist also authored The Chivalry & Sorcery Sourcebook (1978), and Chivalry & Sorcery, 2nd edition (1984).

Backhaus founded the "Loyal Order of Chivalry & Sorcery" (Locs) and was a baron in the SCA. He was also a published philosopher. Most recently he moderated a panel during a conference at University of Maryland, College Park and was a special guest at the Calgary Games Convention (CalCon).

== Death ==
On 14 October 2009 Backhaus died following a two-year battle with cancer.

== Publications ==
=== Academic ===
- 1996 "Hume's Touchstone and the Politics of Meaningful Discourse" Dialogue, XXXV (1996), pages 651-676. Reprinted in Literature Criticism from 1400 to 1800 LC 157 page 223
- 1994 "Shaking the Pillars: Quality and Unspoken Bioethical Values in a Pluralistic Society" Quality Culture: Quality for Turbulent Times. Camrose: J. Ross Enterprises Ltd. pages 100-105.
- 1994 "Hume's Fork and Analytic/Trifling Propositions" Journal of Speculative Philosophy, Volume 8, Number 2 (1994), pages 79–96.
- 1993 "Advantageous Falsehood: The Person Moved By Faith Strikes Back" Philosophy & Theology, Volume 7, Number 3. (Spring, 1993) ages, pages 289-310.
- 1992 "La teoria humeana de las propiedades no sensoriales" Cuadernos de Filosofia, (Translated by Professor M. Costa) Volume 23, Number 38 (November 1992) pages 3–18
- 1992 "Hume and the Politics of Reason" Dialogue, XXXI (1992) pages 65–69.
- 1991 "Is Hume a Neutral Monist?" South West Philosophy Review, Volume 7, Number 2, July, 1991, pages 1–15.

=== Game related ===
- Chevalier, co-author, self-published (1976) - an alternate D&D
- Chivalry & Sorcery 1st edition, co-author, Fantasy Games Unlimited (1977)
- Chivalry & Sorcery Sourcebook, co-author, Fantasy Games Unlimited (1978)
- Rapier & Dagger, author, Fantasy Games Unlimited (1979)
- Middle Sea (a strategic board game), co-designer, Fantasy Games Unlimited (1979)
- Archaeron, author, Archaeron Games Ltd (1980)
- Mage, author, Archaeron Games Ltd, (1980)
- Warrior, author, Archaeron Games Ltd (1981)
- Chivalry & Sorcery 2nd edition, co-author, Fantasy Games Unlimited (1983)
- Chivalry & Sorcery 3rd edition, co-author, Highlander Designs (1996)
- Chivalry & Sorcery Light, co-author Britannia Game Designs Ltd (1999)
- Chivalry & Sorcery Red Book, co-author, GameStuff Inc. (2000) (free download pdf)
