= Operation Peregrine (Space Opera) =

Role-playing game supplement

Operation Peregrine is a 1983 role-playing game adventure for Space Opera published by Fantasy Games Unlimited.

== Contents ==
Operation Peregrine is an adventure in which the player characters investigate a mystery full of subplots, to find the religious leader from the Gatatruit Octant who was kidnapped from his cult temple by a gang.

== Reception ==
Jerry Epperson reviewed Operation Peregrine in Space Gamer No. 70. Epperson commented that "Operation Peregrine is probably one of the better Space Opera modules. It provides a lot for the gaming dollar - I have used the octant described in the book as a basis for a series of adventures and have transposed a lot of the alien races into other quadrants. The puzzle itself is challenging, and inexperienced players (read: those of the strictly 'blast-it-and-move-on' mentality) will find it a difficult one to solve. I would recommend this to anyone gamemastering an SFRPG who is looking for a change of pace."
