= Chivalry & Sorcery Sourcebook =

Fantasy role-playing game supplement

Chivalry & Sorcery Sourcebook is a supplement published by Fantasy Games Unlimited (FGU) in 1978 for the fantasy role-playing game Chivalry & Sorcery.

== Contents ==
Chivalry & Sorcery Sourcebook is a supplement that presents new characters classes and includes essays about medieval times on topics such as hunting, economics, trade, military mobilization, and medicine, and as well as theories of magic.

== Publication history ==
After the publication of the first fantasy role-playing game, Dungeons & Dragons in 1974, many rival game systems soon appeared in the market, including Tunnels & Trolls, White Bear and Red Moon, and in 1977, FGU's complex Chivalry & Sorcery. The following year, FGU followed up with Chivalry & Sorcery Sourcebook, designed by Edward E. Simbalist and Wilf K. Backhaus. A second sourcebook followed in 1981. After the second edition of Chivalry & Sorcery was published in 1983, FGU reissued an update Sourcebook the same year, a 72-page softcover book designed by Simablist, Trevor Clarke, Wes Ives, and Gerald Schiller.

== Reception ==
In Issue 44 of The Space Gamer, Ronald Pehr commented, ""If you don't play C&S, don't want to, and are uninterested in the background of fantasy adventures, you won't like Sourcebook. But, if you've played C&S, or might, or just want to see how to build a dream world (and furnish it, and move in first of the month), risk the sawbuck. Buy this book."

In the French game magazine Casus Belli, Thierry Martin noted "The book is interesting because it precisely answers some questions concerning obscure points in the rules. This allows for complete development of a campaign based on the Middle Ages, and more specifically on chivalry and fantasy."
