= Alien Base =

Role-playing game adventure

Alien Base is a 1981 role-playing game adventure for Space Opera published by Fantasy Games Unlimited.

== Contents ==
Alien Base is an adventure in which the player characters search for the missing survey ship Timothy on the planet Thonne, where invading alien Slavers have taken over the native population and have similar plans for humanity.

== Publication history ==
Alien Base was the second adventure published by Fantasy Games Unlimited for Space Opera.

== Reception ==
William A. Barton reviewed Alien Base in The Space Gamer No. 48. Barton commented that "Alien Base [is] a relatively complete and satisfying adventure for SO, either as a stand-alone scenario or as the first in a planned series. If you enjoy Space Opera, I recommend Alien Base."
