= Scott Bizar =

Role-playing game designer

- Occupation: Game publisher

Scott B. Bizar is the founder of Fantasy Games Unlimited, a game publisher that contracts writers and artists who work primarily on role-playing games.

== Career ==
Scott Bizar founded Fantasy Games Unlimited (FGU) after he became dissatisfied with games from TSR such as Dungeons & Dragons (1974) and Warriors of Mars (1974). Its first two products were man-to-man miniatures combat game systems Gladiators (1975), and Royal Armies of the Hyborean Age (1975), the first to take place in the world of Conan and co-designed by his roommate Lin Carter.

Bizar met Edward E. Simbalist and Wilf K. Backhaus at Gen Con IX in 1976. He was interested in their role-playing game Chevalier which they decided not to sell to TSR; Bizar helped get their game published over the next year as Chivalry & Sorcery, the first role-playing game from FGU.

Bizar wanted a new science-fiction roleplaying game to be one of the flagships for FGU by the late 1970s, and contracted with Simbalist and Phil McGregor to develop one. It was published in 1980 as Space Opera. During the process, Bizar never met Simbalist, McGregor, or A. Mark Ratner; the project was completed over more than two years entirely by correspondence.

In the early 1980s, Bizar obtained the rights to product lines from publishers that had gone out of business, acquiring Bushido and Aftermath! from Phoenix Games in 1981. FGU purchased the rights to Swordbearer from its publisher Heritage USA, and also bought the old stock of the game; FGU published their own edition in 1985.

Bizar looked into new locations for FGU in 1987 that could lower his warehousing costs, and decided to move to Arizona where his friend Rick Loomis and his company Flying Buffalo were located. Bizar initially rented office and warehouse space in Tempe, but since FGU was having difficulties, Bizar worked as a car salesman and a school teacher. His parents were running Waterloo game stores in New York. Bizar wanted to continue with the hobbyist industry, so he used some of their stock to open a Waterloo game store in Gilbert, Arizona; the offices and warehouse for FGU soon moved there. Bizar opened a second store in Phoenix, Arizona, but an employee at the Gilbert store used his name to get credit cards and bank accounts, offering the Waterloo stores as collateral; this fraud cost Bizar money as did the accompanying lawsuits. Bizar closed the Phoenix store in 1996. Bizar had been reprinting some older books from FGU, while also preparing new books, but he stopped publishing because of the fraud.

Even though all of the games published by FGU were owned by their authors and FGU had ceased publishing by the late 1980s, Bizar claimed that the products continued to remain in print since he was selling the backstock through his store. This allowed him to claim ownership over all of the trademarks to the games and that they did not revert to their authors, even if other game rights did revert. Gold Rush Games licensed Bushido from its authors and intended to publish a third edition in 1996, but Bizar hurried the game into print again and advised Gold Rush Games that he would bring a lawsuit against them if they released their new edition. Bizar continued to keep most of the FGU properties off the market into the early 2000s by threatening lawsuits, although he was willing to sell rights to the games if the purchaser would also accept the cost of all backstock.

Bizar started a website in 2000 to sell his extensive existing backstock of FGU products, and continued to market reproductions of previously published FGU material. Bizar also published some new books, including a second edition of Aftermath! Technology! (2008) from Dinosaur Games and the supplements Aftermath! Magic! (2010) and the Aftermath! Survival Guide (2008) by David Harmer that had not been previously published; Bizar likewise released some original PDFs in 2010 for Villains and Vigilantes (V&V) and made them available for free. Jeff Dee and Jack Herman contended that their contract was with the company FGU Inc. rather than with Bizar personally, so therefore Bizar no longer had publishing rights for V&V; Dee and Herman sent a cease-and-desist letter to Bizar in June 2010, informing him that he would not be allowed to sell games that they owned, and then Dee and Herman released Villains and Vigilantes (2010) version 2.1 using their newly created Monkey House Games brand. Bizar continued to refuse a license through early 2011 to have the right to keep publishing material Villains and Vigilantes and refused the arbitration with Dee and Herman that they stated their contract required. Bizar published some Giant volumes which collected older V&V publications along with new releases including Escape from the Micro-Universe (2011) for V&V and The Gauntlet (2011) for Aftermath! .
