= Martigan Belt: An Adventure in the Asteroids =

Tabletop role-playing game supplement

Martigan Belt: An Adventure in the Asteroids is a 1981 role-playing game adventure for Space Opera published by Fantasy Games Unlimited.

== Contents ==
Martigan Belt is an adventure involving Martigan III, which is the primary world in the Martigan system.

== Reception ==
William A. Barton reviewed Martigan Belt in The Space Gamer No. 45. Barton commented that "Overall, Martigan Belt is just a bit slim and lacking in completeness for its price. It's not as useful as it could have been, though it might still prove helpful for a starmaster just beginning the complex feat of constructing a Space Opera universe for his players."
