= Mage (Archaeron) =

Tabletop role-playing game

- Publication date: 1980

Mage is a 1980 rulebook for the Archaeron Game System.

== Contents ==
Mage is a supplement designed to add to a fantasy campaign, or it can be used as a magical combat rules system.

== Reception ==
Lloyd W. Willis reviewed Mage in The Space Gamer No. 37. Willis commented that "The main problem with Mage is that it requires a thorough and imaginative referee. Since such referees are always in short supply, using Mage in your campaign is likely to be quite disappointing. On the other hand, if you use it for the one-on-one magical combat, it promises all the excitement of the last Duran-Leonard fight."

Clayton Miner reviewed Mage for Pegasus magazine and stated that "Play is often fast paced and interesting, with the players becoming quite involved with their personae, another reason that Judges should try this out."

Steven List reviewed Mage for Different Worlds magazine and stated that "The use of this magic system in an actual role-playing campaign seems pointless. So much time and effort must be diverted to resolving the magic use that the players may as well be attempting magic on a real-time basis. The rules suggest Mage be played as a magical contest in an arena-type situation. This may be a bit more practical, but for ordinary use it is too complex and time-consuming."
