= Ground & Air Equipment =

Role-playing game supplement

Ground & Air Equipment is a 1981 role-playing game supplement for Space Opera published by Fantasy Games Unlimited.

== Contents ==
Ground & Air Equipment is a supplement which focuses on military hardware and heavy systems, and also includes aircraft and space fighters.

== Publication history ==
Ground & Air Equipment is the first supplement to Space Opera.

== Reception ==
William A. Barton reviewed Ground & Air Equipment in The Space Gamer No. 41. Barton commented that "Overall, I would rate Ground and Air Equipment as an indispensable play aid for military inclined Space Opera enthusiasts in spite of its flaws. Those who use Space Marines rules for their miniature play should find it a useful tool as well."
