= Swords & Sorcerers =

Tabletop role-playing game supplement

Swords & Sorcerers is a 1978 role-playing game supplement published by Fantasy Games Unlimited for Chivalry & Sorcery.

== Contents ==
Swords & Sorcerers is a supplement containing historical and religious information with and game mechanics for Vikings, Mongols, and Celts.

== Publication history ==
Shannon Appelcline noted that "From 1977-1979 C&S was supplemented by more than half-a-dozen books. The game innately appealed only to a very sophisticated group of the most serious roleplayers but amongst these players several of the supplements were quite well-received, including Bireme & Galley (1978) - which contained naval combat rules - and Swords & Sorcerers (1978) - which contained rules for the Norse, Picts, Gaels, Britons and Mongols."

== Reception ==
Ronald Pehr reviewed Swords & Sorcerers in The Space Gamer No. 45. Pehr commented that "Anyone who plays Chivalry & Sorcery, or anyone who just wants to see what fantasy role-playing is all about, wants to buy Swords & Sorcerers."

Paul Cockburn reviewed Swords & Sorcerers for Imagine magazine, and stated that "With this book, useful information is presented in such a way that the GM quickly introduce elements of these societies into the campaign. C&S is rightly praised as a game that encourages role-playing, as opposed to 'adventuring' (as Daredevils) or random combat (as Merc), and this manual will provide considerable extra enjoyment to its adherents."
