= Space Marines (wargame) =

Miniatures wargame

Space Marines is a science fiction miniatures wargame created by A. Mark Ratner.

== Publication history ==
There were two editions. The first was published by FanTac Games (1977) and the second by Fantasy Games Unlimited (1980). Both versions include artwork by David C. Sutherland III.

The FanTac version of the game included conversion rules for the original Dungeons & Dragons and Metamorphosis Alpha. These were later removed in the FGU edition.

Stan Johansen created a line of 25mm figures for Space Marines, some of which are still in production as of 2011.

The Space Marines universe became the background to FGU's Space Opera role-playing game.

== Reception ==
Lynn Willis reviewed the Fantac version of Space Marines in The Space Gamer No. 13. Willis commented that "Space Marines presents a superior version of what we already have."

Mike Hodson-Smith reviewed the Fantac version of Space Marines for White Dwarf #8, and stated that "the games played were realistic and very enjoyable and well worth the while."

William A. Barton reviewed the FGU version of Space Marines in The Space Gamer No. 34. Barton commented that "if detail and realism without any sacrifice of playability is what you're looking for in a SF miniatures rulebook, you won't be going wrong by adding Space Marines to your collection."

Space Marines served as the inspiration for Kirk Bozigian's team at Hasbro to create the "Battle Force" subline for G.I. Joe: A Real American Hero toyline.

== Reviews ==
- Dragon #45 (January 1981)

== See also ==
- Galac-Tac
- Starweb
