= Star Sector Atlas 1: the Terran Sector =

Tabletop role-playing game supplement

Star Sector Atlas 1: the Terran Sector is a 1981 role-playing game supplement for Space Opera published by Fantasy Games Unlimited.

== Contents ==
Star Sector Atlas 1: the Terran Sector is a fully mapped space sector with planetary descriptions for players to explore.

== Publication history ==
Star Sector Atlas 1: the Terran Sector was the first set of star sector maps published by FGU for the Space Opera role-playing game.

== Reception ==
William A. Barton reviewed Star Sector Atlas 1: the Terran Sector in The Space Gamer No. 45. Barton commented that "If you're a Space Opera player or GM, you'll probably find Star Sector Atlas 1: the Terran Sector an invaluable play aid. Even those who prefer other SF systems might find some useful items to adapt to their games as well."
