= Seldon's Compendium of Starcraft 1 =

Tabletop role-playing game supplement

Seldon's Compendium of Starcraft 1 is a 1981 role-playing game supplement for Space Opera published by Fantasy Games Unlimited.

== Contents ==
Seldon's Compendium of Starcraft 1 is a supplement that includes game statistics as well as deck plans for around 20 starships and other smaller ships.

== Reception ==
William A. Barton reviewed Seldon's Compendium of Starcraft 1 in The Space Gamer No. 50. Barton commented that "Overall, Seldon's Compendium of Starcraft 1 appears to be a well-planned out aid for Space Opera and should prove quite useful to players and starmasters alike."
