= Chivalry & Sorcery =

Role-playing game

- Designers: Edward E. Simbalist, Wilf K. Backhaus
- Publishers: Fantasy Games Unlimited (1st and 2nd edition); Highlander Games (3rd edition); Brittannia Game Designs (Light, Rebirth, Essence v1.1, and 5th edition)
- Publication: 1977 (1st edition); 1983 (2nd edition); 1996 (3rd edition); 1999 (Light edition); 2000 (Rebirth edition); 2011 (Essence v1.1); 2020 (5th edition)
- Genres: Fantasy
- Systems: Custom, Skillscape (since 3rd edition), Essence

Chivalry & Sorcery is a fantasy role-playing game (FRP) first published in 1977 by Fantasy Games Unlimited. Created by Edward E. Simbalist and Wilf K. Backhaus in 1977, Chivalry & Sorcery (C&S) was an early competitor to Dungeons & Dragons (D&D). The designers of the game were dissatisfied with the lack of realism in D&D and created a gaming system derived from it, named Chevalier. They intended to present it to Gary Gygax at Gen Con in 1977 but changed their minds once at Gen Con once they met Scott Bizar who wrote out a letter of intent. After some changes eliminated the last remnants of D&D (e.g. the game contained a table of "Saving-throws" similar to D&D), Simbalist and Backhaus published the first edition of their game, now renamed Chivalry & Sorcery.

According to Michael Tresca, Chivalry & Sorcery "embraced a realistic approach to medieval France in the 12th century, complete with feudalism and the Catholic Church..." and he noted that the game was one of the first to use the term "game master" and was also "one of the first games to place the setting at utmost importance over the mechanics of the game." More focused on medieval chivalry than fantasy, Chivalry & Sorcery had from its inception a complex set of rules.

== Editions ==
=== First edition (C&S1) ===
Fantasy Games Unlimited published the first edition in 1977.

The game includes rules for character creation, combat, magic, and wargames. The background is influenced by medieval France and Christianity, with Knights (tournaments, courtly love, fiefs, political influence), and a hierarchical priesthood that could perform miracles. The first edition also incorporates elements from The Lord Of The Rings, including hobbits and balrogs. These references disappeared in later editions for trademark reasons.

==== Character Creation ====
Prior to the start of the game, players each create a player character, taking note of certain details (explained below) about them.

A player randomly determines their character’s attributes, which describe the character’s proficiency in a wide variety of skills commonly used throughout gameplay. An alignment (a moral or ethical compass) is also determined for player characters.

The only part of character creation that really sets C&S apart from other FRPs is the inclusion of a chance for a character to be born with a randomly determined vocation or inability within a certain role, e.g. being born a talented warrior.

==== Magic ====
The game features its own magic system. In essence, several attributes outlined throughout character creation determine how effective a character’s magic is.

==== Reception ====
Two reviews of Chivalry & Sorcery appeared in Ares Magazine. In the inaugural issue of March 1980, Greg Costikyan gave the game an average score of 6 out of 9, saying, "Although the lack of world-design rules and poor organization are sorely felt, C&S remains the best full-scale complicated FRP game published to date." In the magazine's September 1980 edition (Issue #4), Eric Goldberg liked the well-researched information on the medieval period — particularly heraldry — presented in the rules, but bemoaned the complexity, saying, "The worst problem arises when the game is actually played — it can move as awkwardly as an octopus on dry land." Goldberg called the production values primitive — "The text consists of reduced reproductions of typewritten pages, and the illustrations are fair to mediocre." He also found the extensive rules extremely disorganized. Although Goldberg admitted that "No FRP system has since matched the quantity and quality of its technical system design", he did not recommend the game: "C&S is a poor game for all but the serious devotee of fantasy. It is a worthy purchase for he who wishes a reference work from which to authenticate FRP rules; it is a terrible investment for he who wishes one FRP system upon which to base a campaign."

In the October 1981 edition of The Space Gamer (Issue No. 44), Jon Tindel agreed that the rules were complex and extensive, but thought that the investment of time to learn them was worth it: "It has been said that C&S is unplayable, that it is better as a work of reference, but that is emphatically untrue. I know many people who play C&S and enjoy the game very much [...] It all comes down to one question: are you willing to spend the time to learn the complicated rules? If you are, by all means buy C&S; your reward will be many hours of joy. If you are not, stay away, it is not for you."

In the 1980 book The Complete Book of Wargames, game designer Jon Freeman thought that the game was too complex to be played, and added "Even if the question of complexity were disregarded, it's not suited for dungeon adventures of the conventional sort, and indeed the monsters and most of the fantasy material are included almost as an afterthought." He also thought the magic systems, although "interesting, well researched and fairly 'realistic', [are] wildly unsuited to normal adventuring." Freeman concluded by suggesting that the game was more suitable as reference material for another role-playing game, and gave it an Overall Evaluation of "Poor as a game; Excellent as a source."

In his 1990 book The Complete Guide to Role-Playing Games, game critic Rick Swan found the overly detailed game overwhelming for most players, calling it "among the most complex RPGs ever published." Swan found the magic system especially complicated and pointed out that the rules themselves warned players "to think twice before choosing mages as characters. It's a warning worth taking seriously: the C&S magic system involves a mind-numbing collection of tables, formulas, and rules that could serve as a grad school text in wizardry." Swan commented that "The rest of the game is equally tough, and the skimpy examples of play, poor organization, and confusing charts don't help." Swan concluded by giving the game a rating of 2.5 out of 4, saying, "For players with insatiable appetites for detail, there are few better choices than Chivalry & Sorcery. The less obsessive will find C&S more valuable as a source of ideas."

In a retrospective review of Chivalry & Sorcery in Black Gate, James Maliszewski said "Fond as I am of C&S, there's little question in my mind that those tools were often hard to use and cumbersome. Despite that, at least in the circles in which I moved, C&S was very influential. I didn’t know anyone who actually played the game itself, but the ideas Backhaus and Simbalist advanced through it held a lot of power."

In his 2023 book Monsters, Aliens, and Holes in the Ground, RPG historian Stu Horvath noted, "There is a beauty in complex rules, and Chivalry & Sorcery's vividly imply a world in a way that few other RPGs, then or now, manage ... All of this detail encouraged a new kind of focus on roleplaying, certainly, but one that is bogged down by the weight of its rules and their insistence on intricately simulating the world."

==== Reviews ====
- Fantastic Science Fiction v27 n9
- Jeux & Stratégie #14
- The Playboy Winner's Guide to Board Games

=== Second edition (C&S2) ===
The second edition, released in 1983, was presented in a cardboard box containing three booklets of rules. There are no fundamental mechanical changes as compared with C&S1, but multiple changes try to clarify or simplify some points in the rules. The medieval setting was clearly divided into three distinct periods: Early Feudal, High Chivalric Feudal, and Late Chivalric Feudal, each period having a distinct technology. For example: Heavy plate armor and two-handed swords only become available in Late Feudal (14th - 15th centuries).

==== Reception ====
In Issue 26 of Abyss, Eric Olson reviewed the second edition and noted, "I can't say that it doesn't still have problems ... FGU [Fantasy Games Unlimited] likes complicated rules, and while these are streamlined, they are still complex, maybe more than it absolutely has to be." Olson also found the magic system was still unwieldy." Despite these issues, Olson concluded, "All things considered, I think the new C&S is one of the best games on the market ...Even if I don't adopt the system, it is a treasure trove of useful information and ideas."

In the October 1983 edition of White Dwarf (Issue 46), Marcus Rowland found that various aspects were still overly complex. Rowland did admit that some of the complexity allowed for unique characters, noting, "Probably the best feature of these rules is their attention to detail... expressed in such minutiae as the table used to develop the exact culinary skills, and... tables for Eye and Hair color." Rowland concluded by scoring the complexity of the game 10 out of 10 but its playability only 6 out of 10, expressing reservations about the suitability for new gamers: "I cannot recommend this game to inexperienced referees or players, but anyone with some knowledge of roleplaying games who is looking for a complex system for a prolonged campaign will probably find Chivalry & Sorcery ideal. If the rules were slightly better organized and the set gave more aid in character generation and setting up campaigns, I would not have these reservations."

In Issue 12 of the British magazine Imagine, Paul Mason though the second edition "mistakenly attempts to compete with the AD&D game in terms of detail – a hopeless task which can only produce a fragmented and complex set of rules." Mason concluded, "As a reference work, and as a source of ideas for incorporation into other games, Chivalry & Sorcery is still excellent, but I doubt it will shake its popular image as a cult game on the fringes of the hobby mainstream."

In the April 1984 edition of Dragon (Issue 84), Ken Rolston found the overhauled rules of the second edition were still too complicated, saying, "The game was revised to broaden its appeal, but the presentation still shows problems, and the audience is still limited, because of the bulk and detail involved. This game is committed to comprehensiveness, at the expense of comprehensibility. C&S is still the most difficult and time-consuming FRP system on the market, when played at a level that fully exploits its virtues." Rolston concluded, "This is the wrong product for the beginning or casual FRP gamer. For the intermediate gamer, it may be useful as a supplement and sourcebook. But as a complete campaign system, the virtues of C&S are only fully realized in the hands of the superior gamer — one who's serious, sophisticated, dedicated, and familiar with medieval history, legend, and fantasy literature."

Ron Pehr reviewed Bushido and Chivalry & Sorcery for Fantasy Gamer magazine and stated that "As fascinating roleplaying experiences, either of these games is superb; neither will disappoint any serious gamer; both are highly recommended as near-ultimate fantasy roleplaying games."

In Issue 36 of Different Worlds, Reid Hoffman commented, "For a player interested in quick and easy play, simple rules, and not the C&S type of campaign, avoid C&S like the Black Plague. For a player looking for material to enliven his fantasy-feudal campaign with culture and breadth of information, or willing to give a lot of effort to a campaign, C&S is quite good."

==== Reviews ====
- Casus Belli (Issue 5 - September 1981)

=== Third edition (C&S3) ===
The game was revised and reissued in a Third Edition (dubbed The Green Book, from its color) by Highlander Designs (HD), an American publishing house founded by G. W. Thompson. The authors of the third edition were Ed Simbalist, Wilf Backhaus and G. W. Thompson. C&S3 features the almost complete disappearance of medieval references. The Third Edition removed the integral gritty medieval French historical and cultural background.

C&S3 established a system of "skills" which covers all areas of the game, including fighting, magic, knowledge of geography, languages, dances and songs, and other things a person is able to do or know. The talent system (called "Skills cape") uses a percentile die and a 10-sided die (D10) for all actions determined by talent; the D10 determines if the success (or failure) of talent is "critical" or not.

==== Reception ====
Andrew Rilstone reviewed Chivalry & Sorcery 3rd Edition for Arcane magazine, rating it a 5 out of 10 overall, and stated that "D&D has survived for 20 years by adapting as the hobby progresses. C&S thinks that a marginally streamlined version of a game that was thought over-complex in 1978 is 'truly revolutionary'. It is wrong."

The reviewer from Pyramid #29 (Jan./Feb., 1998) stated that "It definitely uses some modern production features (though the layout is a bit busy and plagued by typos), but the defining aspects of most '90s games - quick character generation, rules-lightness, storytelling not dice-rolling - aren't a part of this game. Instead, C&S3 recalls the early days of gaming with an emphasis on rules and charts to cover just about any conceivable situation."

==== Reviews ====
- Valkyrie #14 (1997)
- Backstab (Issue 2 - Mar/Apr 1997)

=== Fourth edition (C&S4) ===
Highlander Designs went bankrupt and was bought by Britannia Game Designs Ltd. (BGD), a company based in England and directed by Steve Turner. The fourth edition of C&S, called "The Rebirth" was born a few months later and released in 2000.

The core rules had several extensions, including the "Knights Companion", "Armorers Companion," "Dwarves Companion" and "Elves Companion".

=== Fifth edition (C&S5) ===
Britannia Game Designs Ltd. launched a Kickstarter campaign to launch the Fifth Edition of the game that successfully completed on July 31, 2019. The game shipped in February 2020.

== Awards ==
Chivalry & Sorcery won the H.G. Wells award for All Time Best Ancient Medieval Rules of 1979.
