= Powered by the Apocalypse =

Design framework for tabletop role-playing games

- Logo
- Other names: PbtA
- Designers: Meguey Baker; Vincent Baker
- Publication: 2010; 16 years ago
- Genres: Indie role-playing game; Tabletop role-playing game
- Notable examples: Apocalypse World; Avatar Legends: The Roleplaying Game; Bluebeard's Bride; Dungeon World; Ironsworn; Masks: A New Generation; Monsterhearts; Thirsty Sword Lesbians
- Website: http://apocalypse-world.com/pbta/policy; https://lumpley.games/2023/11/22/what-is-pbta/

Powered by the Apocalypse (PbtA) is a tabletop role-playing game design framework developed by Meguey Baker and Vincent Baker for the 2010 game Apocalypse World and later adapted for other indie role-playing games.

== Game mechanics ==
Most Powered by the Apocalypse (PbtA) games share some similarities in game mechanics; nevertheless, the Bakers define a PbtA game not by its mechanics, but simply by its designers' decision to cite Apocalypse World as an influence. Both definitions of PbtA are in use.

=== Typical mechanical features in PbtA games ===
Powered by the Apocalypse games are typically centered on resolving what characters do as "moves." Characters have access to a default selection of moves based on the expectations of the game setting. For example, in the fantasy game Dungeon World, characters have access to a hack and slash move, as combat is central to the dungeoneering experience. Alternatively, Apocalypse World has a "seize by force" move, as the game assumes a setting where collecting scarce resources is part of the game-play experience.

Moves are often resolved by rolling two six-sided dice (2d6) and adding any relevant modifiers. Success levels fall on a scale of total success, partial success, or miss. Partial success often means "success at a cost," where players must select an additional negative outcome as the price of success. Likewise, "miss" often means a negative outcome that moves the narrative forward, rather than "nothing happens."

Most PbtA games are class-based. Character classes have access to a number of class-specific moves. Emily St. James of Vox highlighted that "in PBTA games, players roll two six-sided dice (or D6s) to determine whether they succeed or fail at tasks set for them by the game master. The GM, in turn, keeps things moving and tries to preserve a modicum of continuity. But the players also have extreme amounts of leeway to help shape the world and their relationships with other characters". James Hanna, for CBR, contrasted the mechanics of PbtA and Dungeons & Dragons highlighting that:

the differences really come down to crunch and conversation. Players looking for a sandbox or linear adventure with lots of crunchy combat will enjoy D&D in all its glorious variety. Those who want a more collaborative storytelling experience with fewer granular choices (and probably less math) should try PbtA games

Keerthi Sridharan of Polygon wrote, "Games that use the PbtA label are ones that take their cues from Apocalypse World regarding any number of things: running a session zero, how dice mechanics work, or even aesthetic and design elements."

PbtA games typically employ shared world creation. Instead of providing a comprehensive setting with pre-written details that the GM already knows and gradually reveals to the players, the GM and the players collaborate to create details of the world. Similarly, PbtA games often include players in the creation of NPCs. As an example of the commonness of this expectation for PbtA games, Visigoths vs. Mall Goths mentions the PbtA game Masks: A New Generation as a design influence and uses some typical PbtA mechanics like playbooks and 2d6 dice, but includes a section addressed to players of PbtA games to trust that the GM has all the information about the setting and NPCs.

=== Originators' statements on PbtA mechanics ===
Although most PbtA games contain some or all of the above features, Vincent Baker wrote that PbtA:

isn't the name of a category of games, a set of games' features, or the thrust of any games' design. It's the name of Meg's and my policy concerning others' use of our intellectual property and creative work. [...] Its use in a game's trade dress signifies ONLY that the game was inspired by Apocalypse World in a way that the designer considers significant, and that it follows our policy [with respect to] others' use of our creative work

=== Offshoots ===
Some PbtA games with radically different mechanics have inspired new trends and design movements of their own, including Forged in the Dark by John Harper, Belonging Outside Belonging by Avery Alder and Benjamin Rosenbaum, and the Bakers' own Firebrands Framework.

== Reception and analysis ==
Multiple reviews discuss how the system's reliance on moves provides a streamlined focus on the fiction. Emily St. James for Vox wrote that the "stripped-down simplicity makes PBTA games a natural fit for people spreading their wings either as players or game masters." Bitch magazine commented on the messy interconnected relationships the system produces. Academic PS Berge also commented on the messy nature of characters in PbtA games and highlighted that many PbtA games "actively support queer narrative". Coleman Gailloreto of Screen Rant highlighted Vincent Baker's game design theory articles, noting that "designers building their own 'Powered By The Apocalypse' games will learn from posts that talk about how to construct 'Moves,' how to refine a game through iteration, and how to move the themes of a 'PBTA' game away from conflict and towards other transformative experiences".

Berge viewed Apocalypse World by Vincent and Meguey Baker as "the beginning of a critical era in 'fiction-first' TRPG design". Berge wrote that the game "itself is less important to the legacy of independent TRPGs than the Baker's invitation to other designers: 'If you've created a game inspired by Apocalypse World, and would like to publish it, please do'. [...] What designates a game as PbtA is complicated. [...] Instead, the label is an unpoliced 'homage' – designers may choose to signal a relationship between their game and AW using the label and a logo. In other words, 'PbtA' is not a branding or a mechanical linkage to AW's system but a mark of ludic etymology". James Hanna, for CBR in 2020, discussed the lasting impact of the PbtA framework on role-playing game design – "ten years on, Powered by the Apocalypse games (PbtA) are everywhere. The Bakers designed the PbtA engine so that other game designers could 'hack' it, creating games with similar mechanics, but unique worlds and rules. More than four dozen games bear the PbtA license, making Apocalypse World incredibly influential. That influence continues to be felt as games move into new territories and find new audiences". Hanna noted "the result of that empowerment is a thriving and diverse community of PbtA games, each with its own unique flavor and design. [...] Because the PbtA mechanics are so flexible, any kind of game is possible". Keerthi Sridharan of Polygon commented that "while I’d still highly recommend getting into Apocalypse World, there are so many different ways to get into other PbtA-style games. In Magpie Games’ Velvet Glove you can be a ’70s high school girl gang; in Evil Hat's Monster of the Week you can be a group of monster-hunting detectives. [...] You could also try my personal favorite, Masks: A New Generation, which stars a coupla goddamn kids who are, obviously, secretly superheroes. The possibilities are endless".

=== Awards ===
Apocalypse World won the 2010 Indie RPG Award for Most Innovative Game. Additional awards for PbtA games appear in the following list of games.

== List of games ==
Because of the simplicity and the flexibility of the Powered by the Apocalypse engine, and Vincent Baker's encouragement of publishing hacks, there is a large number of PbtA games. As of April 2023, Itch.io listed over 800 products tagged as PbtA. The following is a list of PbtA games that have received press coverage and/or awards.

Alas for the Awful Sea
Alas for the Awful Sea, designed by Vee Hendro and Hayley Gordon, is a game about a ship's crew in the 19th century navigating the remote corners of the British Isles in a world consumed with suspicion, sadness, and desperation. It is published by Storybrewers.
Apocalypse Keys
Apocalypse Keys is a mystery game about monsters who decide to save the world, designed by Rae Nedjadi and published by Evil Hat Productions. It is inspired by Hellboy, Bureau for Paranormal Research and Defense, Men in Black, Penny Dreadful, and Doom Patrol.
Apocalypse World
Apocalypse World is the post-apocalyptic game the system was created for and is set after an unspecified apocalypse (which may either be specified in the course of play or left a mystery) that created a psychic maelstrom.
Avatar Legends
Avatar Legends: The Roleplaying Game, designed by Magpie Games, is set in the world of Nickelodeon's Avatar: The Last Airbender. Taking players through numerous eras of the series, Avatar Legends: The Roleplaying Game lets players engage with tales long past and tales yet to be told as players take control of elemental benders, masters of weapons, or wielders of new-fangled technologies.
Bluebeard's Bride
Bluebeard's Bride is a gothic horror tabletop role-playing game based on the Bluebeard folktale. Players represent five aspects of a woman's mind as she explores the mansion of her frightening new husband. It was designed and written by Whitney "Strix" Beltrán, Marissa Kelly, and Sarah Richardson, and published by Magpie Games in 2017.
Brindlewood Bay
Brindlewood Bay is a murder mystery game, described as combining Murder, She Wrote with H.P. Lovecraft.
City of Mist
City of Mist, designed by Son of Oak Game Studio, is set in a modern-day metropolis where ordinary people of all walks of life become modern-day reincarnations of myths, legends, and fairy tales, gaining magical powers and abilities. The game's narrative driven engine is partially based on the Powered by the Apocalypse game engine and the tag system featured in free RPG Lady Blackbird.
Dungeon World
Dungeon World is a fantasy game, created by Sage LaTorra and Adam Koebel. The game is advertised as having old-school style with modern rules.
Epyllion
Epyllion is a game where players play dragons in a dragon-centric world, published by Magpie Games.
Fantasy World
Fantasy World is a tabletop role-playing game published by MS Edizioni, based on the Powered by the Apocalypse (PbtA) system. Dicebreaker commented that the game "may not be the first Powered by the Apocalypse-inspired RPG to drink heavily from the fantasy well, but it aims to draw in a bunch of contemporary ideas surrounding roleplay and genre storytelling".
Fellowship
Fellowship is a high fantasy game where players control every aspect of their chosen race. The player who controls the Elf, for example, is the only person who has the final say in anything regarding elves. The goal is to defeat the Overlord, a GM-controlled character, by gathering sources of power while trying to prevent the Overlord from destroying communities that could be helpful in defeating them. The game was successfully Kickstarted in 2015 and released in 2016 by LibriGothica Games.
Ironsworn
Ironsworn is a free dark fantasy game where players take the role of adventurers who swear binding oaths.
KULT – Divinity Lost
KULT: Divinity Lost is a reboot of the contemporary horror role-playing game Kult, originally released in 1991. This Kickstarter-funded version of the game features a completely new rule-set, and the setting is updated to present day. Published by Swedish Helmgast and distributed by Modiphius.
MASHED
MASHED explores life in a Mobile Army Surgical Hospital (MASH) during the Korean War.
Masks
Masks: A New Generation is about teenage superheroes learning to bond as a team during both their regular high school lives and their superhero adventures. The game uses conditions instead of hit points in combat. It was designed by Brendan Conway and published by Magpie Games.
Monsterhearts
Monsterhearts is "a story game about the lives of teenage monsters" by Avery Alder. Default statistics are Hot, Cold, Volatile, and Dark, and the playbooks presented in the main rulebook are The Chosen, the Fae, the Ghoul, the Queen, the Witch, the Werewolf, the Infernal, and the Vampire. It was nominated for six separate awards, although it didn't win any.
Monster of the Week
Monster of the Week is "an action-horror role playing game" about a group of monster hunters, written by Michael Sands. Statistics are Charm, Cool, Sharp, Tough, and Weird and the default classes are the Chosen, the Expert, the Flake, the Initiate, the Monstrous, the Mundane, the Professional, the Divine, the Spooky, and the Wronged.
Nahual
Nahual is about "Mexican shapeshifters who hunt down parasitic angels and sell their dismembered body parts on the black market." It was designed by Miguel Ángel Espinoza and published by Magpie Games.
Pasión de las Pasiones
Pasión de las Pasiones lets players create the romantic melodrama of a Telenovela, with core scenarios taking place in a hotel or a family restaurant. Character playbooks fit genre archetypes, including La Belleza ("The Beauty", a young, attractive protagonist) and El Gemelo ("The Twin", another player's identical sibling). Player moves also lend to melodramatic, genre-coded outcomes; "Face Certain Death", for example, allows players to survive by entering a coma or suffering amnesia. It was written by Brandon Leon-Gambetta and published by Magpie Games. It was nominated for the 2023 ENNIE Awards for "Best Game."
Rings and Running Shoes
Rings and Running Shoes is a tabletop role-playing game unofficially based on Sonic the Hedgehog.
Root RPG
Root: the Roleplaying Game is a tabletop roleplaying game based on the original Root board game. Root is a game of woodland creatures fighting for money, justice, and freedom from powers far greater than them. The players take on the roles of vagabonds, outcasts from the normal society of the woodlands. Written by Brendan Conway of Magpie Games, it is officially licensed by Leder Games and created and published by Magpie Games. The project launched on Kickstarter on September 17, 2019, with an initial goal of $10,000, and raised as much in 30 minutes.
Ruma – Dawn of Empire
Ruma: Dawn of Empire is a game by Martin Greening. The game is set in an alternate Roman Empire, called the Ruman Empire, where magic and mythology also exists. The project was launched on Kickstarter where it was successfully funded, having raised $10,046.
Spirit of 77
Spirit of 77 is an action RPG based on 1970s pop culture, including The Six Million Dollar Man, Shaft, and the Dukes of Hazzard. Popular music of the time plays heavily into its gameplay, including the option for players to play 1970s "rockers", ala Fleetwood Mac and Kiss. Published by Monkeyfun Studios.
Thirsty Sword Lesbians
Thirsty Sword Lesbians is a 2021 narrative-focused role-playing game which emphasizes telling "melodramatic and queer stories". It was developed by April Kit Walsh and published by Evil Hat Productions. The base game has nine playbooks (Beast, Chosen, Devoted, Infamous, Nature Witch, Scoundrel, Seeker, Spooky Witch, and Trickster) and characters have five main stats: daring, grace, heart, wit and spirit. Thirsty Sword Lesbians was the first tabletop game to win a Nebula Award and the fourth winner in the "Best Game Writing" category. The game also won the 2022 ENNIE Awards for "Best Game" and for "Product of the Year".
Urban Shadows
Urban Shadows is an urban fantasy game set in "a dark urban environment drowning in supernatural politics", with Archetypes including vampires, werewolves, wizards, ghosts and human monster hunters using the main stats of Blood, Heart, Mind, and Spirit. Urban Shadows introduces systems to emphasize the political, tragic, and horrific aspects of the genre: characters must interact with different Factions to advance, or mark Corruption to gain unique and powerful moves while drawing closer to being retired from play dead or to become antagonists. Written by Andrew Medeiros and Mark Diaz Truman and published by Truman's Magpie Games as a result of a successful Kickstarter campaign. 2016 Ennie Award Nominee for Best Game.
Visigoths vs. Mall Goths
Visigoths vs. Mall Goths is a comedic urban fantasy game with LGBTQ dating sim elements, created by Lucian Kahn. It was nominated for the ENNIE Awards for "Best Writing" in 2020 and the Indie Game Developer Network award for "Best Setting" in 2021. Visigoths vs. Mall Goths doesn't advertise itself as "Powered by the Apocalypse" but lists the PbtA game Masks: A New Generation as a design influence.
The Warren
The Warren is a game that involves "intelligent rabbits trying to make the best of a world filled with hazards, predators and, worst of all, other rabbits. It is a game about survival and community." Published in 2016, "This game takes inspiration from classic rabbit tales such as Watership Down, Fifteen Rabbits, and Peter Rabbit. It uses a heavily modified version of the game mechanics from Vincent Baker’s Apocalypse World."
World Wide Wrestling RPG
World Wide Wrestling RPG is a tabletop roleplaying game that allows players to create their own fictional professional wrestling franchise, wrestlers and storylines. The game is designed by Nathan D. Paoletta.
