= Monsterhearts =

Tabletop role-playing game

- First edition cover
- Designers: Avery Alder
- Publishers: Buried Without Ceremony
- Publication: 2012; 14 years ago
- Genres: Teen drama/paranormal romance
- Systems: Powered by the Apocalypse

Monsterhearts is an indie role-playing game about "the messy lives of teenage monsters." It was designed by Avery Alder as an adaptation of Apocalypse World. It is known for its handling of sexuality and LGBT content. It has been nominated or shortlisted for multiple awards.

== Setting ==
Monsterhearts is set in a fictional high school that along with the surrounding environment is named and fleshed out by all players during character creation. In order to start creating the setting, each player first picks a character class (called a "skin"), with each skin being both a type of monster and a metaphor for the struggles of a teenager. As a part of the character creation process and by using the elements provided as a part of their skins, the players define their characters' relationships with each other and with other elements of the setting.

Then the homeroom for their high school class is drawn, with the players filling in where their characters sit. The GM (known in Monsterhearts as the MC) then fills in some of the rest, leaving blanks for further exploration. At the end of character creation the characters will all have "strings" on each other that can be spent to manipulate, and more can be gained in the course of play.

=== Skins ===
Each skin comes with a collection of "Moves" or special abilities, (every skin starting with either two or three), a default "Darkest Self" that indicates what happens when things go really wrong, and a "Sex Move" that indicates what happens when that character has sex with another. In addition to the default skins found in the rulebook, each edition has additional skins available from the developer or third parties, and advice for modifying skins or creating new ones.

The default skins in Monsterhearts are the Fae, the Ghost, the Ghoul, the Infernal, the Mortal, the Queen, the Vampire, the Werewolf, and the Witch, with first edition adding the Chosen and second edition the Hollow.

=== Sexuality and queer content ===
In Monsterhearts any PC may roll to turn any other character on, and all the characters have a sex move (as indicated above). This is explicitly because as a teenager you don't get to choose what turns you on, and because "Monsterhearts is a game about the confusion that arises when your body and your social world start changing without your permission." It also, because of this, has a two page spread dedicated to using Monsterhearts to explore queer content.

This approach to sexuality has drawn comment, with Bitch Magazine commenting, "Indeed, nearly every rule related to sex and sexuality in Monsterhearts is a game manifestation of real-life sexual dynamics, good and bad, healthy and unhealthy. Instead of the rote, heterosexist portrayals of sex and sexuality you might find in other games, Monsterhearts gleefully encourages people of all identities to explore sexuality in every permutation, often with great self-examination and as uncomfortably as possible. But for a game with such a depth of emotional/sexual content, it's remarkably free of sexism. It also doesn't slut-shame, or enforce traditional gendered tropes of judgment about sexual behavior."

== Gameplay ==
Monsterhearts uses the Powered by the Apocalypse engine created for Apocalypse World by Meguey Baker and Vincent Baker. Whenever a player has declared that they are doing something challenging and risky, the MC asks them to roll 2d6 and add their relevant statistic to perform the relevant move. On a 10+ they succeed, on a 7–9 they succeed but have to take a partial success, or make a hard choice, and on a 6 or less the MC gets to make a Hard Move representing something going badly wrong.

Strings against specific characters are gained through moves, and through turning people on – and may be spent either for a bonus to a dice roll after rolling, to inflict a condition on the target, or to offer them an XP to do something the offering player suggests. Like Apocalypse World, XP is also gained by moves or by using one of two statistics: the one the person with the greatest hold over your character (counted in strings) nominated at the start of the session, and the one the MC nominated.

=== Requirements to play ===
- 3–5 players (one to play the MC)
- Two ordinary six-sided dice each
- A different "skin" for each player
- Quick reference sheets
- However many sessions the players find fun

=== Statistics and moves ===
The statistics in Monsterhearts are Hot, Cold, Volatile, and Dark. Hot can be used to "turn someone on" or (in the first edition) "manipulate an NPC", cold to "shut someone down" or to keep one's nerve and "hold steady", volatile to "lash out physically" or run away", and dark to "Gaze Into The Abyss" and for most skin-specific magical functions.

== Publication history ==
Monsterhearts started out as a joke game when Avery Alder used Apocalypse World to run Twilight, although Alder also lists Jennifer's Body and Ginger Snaps as core inspirations. The initial playtest of Monsterhearts started in 2010, the same year Apocalypse World was produced. Playtesting took most of 2011, with the first edition being launched through Indiegogo in January and February 2012 as a 160-page softcover book with cover art by Konradbak. A second edition was released in 2017.

== Reception ==
Beth Elderkin reviewed Monsterhearts in 2020 as part of a list of romantic tabletop role-playing games, saying that "It's a great game for those wanting to go back to the days of young crushes, backseat make-out sessions, and all the tension around whether you should 'do it' at monster prom."

In his 2023 book Monsters, Aliens, and Holes in the Ground, RPG historian Stu Horvath noted that the use of dice to define sexuality "gives sexual attraction in Monsterhearts a sense of bewilderment and experimentation." Regarding the game's encouragement of queerness in the characters, Horvath writes, "[No other game] has been so explicitly organized around queerness, from the telling of queer stories to encouraging players to actively experiment with queerness." Horvath concluded, "Monsterhearts is an important gateway and it represents a massive step forward to diversifying the hobby."

=== Awards ===
- At the 2012 Indie RPG Awards Monsterhearts was runner-up in the categories "Best Support" and "Game of the Year."
- At the 2012 Golden Geek, Monsterhearts was a finalist for "RPG of the Year."
- At the 2012 Lucca Comics & Games convention, Monsterhearts was a finalist for "Best Role-Playing Game."
- At the 2013 Origins Awards, Monsterhearts was a finalist for "Best Roleplaying Game."
- At the 2018 Origins Awards, the second edition was a finalist for Best Roleplaying Game.
