= Bluebeard's Bride =

Gothic horror tabletop role-playing game

- Cover art by Rebecca Yanovskaya
- Designers: Whitney "Strix" Beltrán, Marissa Kelly, and Sarah Richardson
- Illustrators: Rebecca Yanovskaya, Juan Ochoa, KRING, Jabari Weathers
- Publishers: Magpie Games
- Publication: 2017; 9 years ago
- Genres: tabletop role-playing game, gothic horror
- Systems: Powered by the Apocalypse
- Players: 3-5 plus gamemaster
- Playing time: 2-4 hours
- Age range: adults only
- Skills: role-playing, storytelling

Bluebeard's Bride is a gothic horror tabletop role-playing game published by indie role-playing game publisher Magpie Games in 2017 that is based on the Bluebeard folktale of a young wife left alone in a castle who is tempted to open the wrong door. The game focuses on themes of misogyny and feminism.

== Description ==
Bluebeard's Bride uses the popular folktale as its base: A young bride marries an older man despite some question of where his previous wives have gone. He leaves her alone in his sumptuous castle but warns her not to open one door. Eventually through boredom or curiosity, the young wife opens the forbidden door and discovers the corpses of the previous wives, whom she soon joins when Bluebeard returns.

The gamemaster is called the Groundskeeper. Players do not play an individual character, but a specific piece of the Bride's personality: Animus (hostility), Fatale (seduction), Mother (selflessness), Virgin (vulnerability), and Witch (deception). As the Bride wanders through the castle, she meets both wonders and Horrors that tell her about Bluebeard, and to some extent, about herself. As RPG historian Stu Horvath noted, "Each room is a psychological ordeal for the Bride to confront, and the players must struggle to find different ways to cope."

As the Bride works her way through the castle, her personality will edge towards becoming either fully Faithful or fully Disloyal. If either happens, the Bride arrives at the fateful door. If the Bride is defeated by the Horrors of the castle, she herself becomes a Horror haunting the castle.

The game uses a variation of the Powered by the Apocalypse game system first developed for Apocalypse World.

== Publication ==
Bluebeard's Bride was designed by Whitney "Strix" Beltrán, Marissa Kelly, and Sarah Richardson, and following a successful Kickstarter campaign, it was published by Magpie Games in 2017 as a 112-page book with cover art by Rebecca Yanovskaya and interior art by Yanovskaya, Kring Demetrio, Miguel Ángel Espinoza, Tawny Fritzinger, Juan Ochoa, and Mirco Paganessi.

Magpie Games released Bluebeard's Bride: Book of Rooms in 2018, Bluebeard's Bride: Book of Lore and Bluebeard's Bride: Book of Mirrors in 2019, and Bluebeard's Bride: Booklet of Keepsakes in 2020.

The web show Gudiya was an actual play of Bluebeard's Bride.

== Reception ==
Rebekah Krum for CBR called it one of the ten best Powered by the Apocalypse games.

Jaina Gray for Wired recommended it as one of the six best games to play remotely during the COVID-19 pandemic.

Rachel Beck for Dread Central writes, "The story itself has the elegant simplicity of a fairytale," and it "is an explicitly feminine horror piece, and at its heart it's a game about systemic social and physical violence towards women."

Sharang Biswas for Dicebreaker praised the game mechanics as an expression of the Bluebeard fable's theme: "The game delivers its central ideas of feminist and feminine horror, using powerlessness as a game mechanic and employing supernatural hyperbole of real-world misogyny to highlight anti-feminist thought."

Em Friedman for Polygon praised Gudiya, the actual play of Bluebeard's Bride, as one of the five best moments in actual play in 2023. Gudiya used Bluebeard's Bride "to explore ideas of colonial and gendered violence in a South Asian setting."

Rowan Zeoli for Rascal called Gudiya "the closest I've seen to an actual play art film" and wrote that the players "continually confront which aspects of GUDIYA’s autonomy and culture will be sacrificed as they survive the violent reality of her new life as Bluebeard’s most recent bride."

In his 2023 book Monsters, Aliens, and Holes in the Ground, RPG historian Stu Horvath noted, "The game, conceived and written by three women, is consciously feminine in its construction ... Bluebeard is irredeemable; the traumas that he and his legacy inflict are inherently masculine, and their targets are always feminine."

== Awards ==
=== Bluebeard's Bride ===
- At the 2018 IndieCade Awards, Bluebeard's Bride won the Grand Jury Award.
- At the 2018 Indie Game Developer Network Awards, Bluebeard's Bride won both "Game of the Year" and "Best Art."
- At the 2018 ENnie Awards, Bluebard's Bride was a finalist in the category "Best Production Value."

=== Expansions ===
- At the 2019 Indie Game Developer Awards, Book of Rooms was a winner in the category "Best Art" and Book of Rooms was a finalist for "Product of the Year."
- At the 2019 ENnie Awards, Book of Lore was a finalist for "Best RPG Related Product" and Book of Mirrors was as finalist for "Best Cover" and "Best Layout and Design."
