= Avatar Legends: The Roleplaying Game =

2022 tabletop role-playing game

- Promotional art, depicting Aang (left) and Korra
- Designers: Brendan Conway (Lead), James Mendez Hodes, Yeonsoo Julian Kim, Sharang Biswas, Daniel Kwan, and Sen-Foong Lim
- Publishers: Magpie Games
- Publication: October 26, 2022 (digital), January 25, 2023 (physical)
- Genres: Tabletop role-playing game
- Systems: Powered by the Apocalypse
- Series: Avatar Legends
- Website: Official website

Avatar Legends: The Roleplaying Game is a fantasy tabletop role-playing game produced by Magpie Games. It is set in the world of the animated television series Avatar: The Last Airbender and The Legend of Korra, and takes place in five different time periods. Players take the roles of martial artists, technological experts, or benders – people who can manipulate one of the four classical elements – who fight for balance in the world while also working towards their own goals and struggling with inner balance, represented by opposing ideals held by a character.

The game is lead designed by Brendan Conway, and is built on the Powered by the Apocalypse framework, chosen for its accessibility while enabling systems around bending and politics. It was financed through a crowdfunding campaign, which raised US$9.53M, overtaking The One Ring Roleplaying Game's second edition and the Dungeons & Dragons book Strongholds & Followers as the highest funded campaigns for tabletop games on Kickstarter. (Note: The One Ring Roleplaying Game's second edition raised 17.03M Swedish kronor ($1.98M as of 2021), and Strongholds & Followers raised $2.12M.) A free quickstart e-book with basic rules was released in July 2021. Pre-orders for the full base game opened on October 12, 2022, with the Digital Edition becoming available on October 26. The Wan Shi Tong's Adventure Guide expansion book also became available on October 26, and the physical versions of both it and the base rulebook were released on January 25, 2023. Additional expansion books are planned for a future release.

The game won the 2023 Gold ENNIE Awards for "Best Rules" and "Best Family Game/Product."

== Overview ==
Avatar Legends: The Roleplaying Game is a fantasy tabletop role-playing game set in the world of the animated television series Avatar: The Last Airbender and The Legend of Korra, which is based on historical South Asian, East Asian and Indigenous North American cultures and martial arts. In the setting, some individuals known as benders can manipulate one of the four classical elements – earth, water, air, or fire – but only one person, called the Avatar, can bend all four. Bending is used both as a tool and a weapon, and the elements are each tied to a nation in the setting. Campaigns are set in one of five time periods: Avatar Kyoshi's and Avatar Roku's eras, long before the events of Avatar: The Last Airbender; the hundred-year war era, during the Fire Nation's attacks prior to the beginning of Avatar; Avatar Aang's era, during and after Avatar; and Avatar Korra's era, during the modernizing time of The Legend of Korra. The antagonists of the setting are people with their own goals and desires, rather than monsters that can simply be struck down.

Players create their own characters with the help of playbooks – templates based on archetypes of characters' life experiences, exemplifying different playstyles – and choose between playing as benders, martial artists, or technological savants, all of which are available to any playbook. Led by a gamemaster (GM), players role-play as their characters in one of the five time periods, where they fight for balance in the world, while trying to reach goals they have set out for themselves and struggling with inner balance. This is represented by a balance track, showing a tug-of-war between two opposing ideals a character has, such as confidence versus loyalty. Certain actions and decisions move a counter between the two ideals on the character's track, affecting two related attributes, and when a character is balanced, they have access to a powerful "moment of balance" ability. Characters have four basic attributes – creativity, focus, harmony, and passion – and have differing base abilities based on their playbooks, with the potential to acquire new abilities through a growth mechanic connected to answering questions at the end of play sessions, or through being taught by mentor characters. Storytelling in the game is structured similarly to the television shows, with individual play sessions corresponding to episodes that together form seasons.

== Production ==
Avatar Legends is produced by Magpie Games, by ten full-time staff and several part-time contributors, with Brendan Conway and James Mendez Hodes as lead designers. The team worked together with many other Asian game designers, writers, and consultants to portray the game's setting as authentically as possible. The designers intended the game to be accessible to players of all ages, and sought to capture what they saw as the core of the Avatar franchise: balance, heroism, the power of friendship, growing up in wartime, the responsibility of power, the damaging legacy of colonialism, and empathy in relationships.

The game is designed with the Powered by the Apocalypse framework as a base, which Magpie Games had previously used in games including Masks: A New Generation and Root: The Roleplaying Game; they chose it as they considered it accessible for those new to role-playing games, while allowing for systems around elemental bending and politics. They also appreciated Powered by the Apocalypse's character playbooks, which they focused on archetypes of different lived experiences rather than an "innate characteristic like race or heritage", with the intent of exploring life in a world of colonization and systemic oppression, and encouraging players to role-play characters rather than Asian stereotypes.

In addition to this concern around handling Asian cultural influences on the setting – made somewhat easier by the lack of a direct analogue to white people in the setting, making the Asian characters less othered – one of the production team's major concerns was the portrayal of bending. Magpie Games' CEO Mark Truman thought that although it would have been easy to define bending through a rules-heavy system akin to how magic is handled in Dungeons & Dragons, it would have gone against the ubiquity of bending in the setting. Instead, they chose to let characters have varying competency and training in bending, affecting how well they can manipulate their element, and, taking cues from characters in the television series, let players customize the bending in accordance with their characters' personalities.

== Crowdfunding and release ==
Magpie Games announced the game in February 2021, after licensing the Avatar franchise from ViacomCBS the year prior, and released a trailer for it in August 2021, narrated by Greg Baldwin as Uncle Iroh, reprising the role from the television series. They financed the game through a campaign on the crowdfunding website Kickstarter, which ran from August 3 to September 2, 2021. The campaign originally had a goal of US$50,000, which was reached in 16 minutes; by the end of the first day, it had surpassed one million, reaching further crowdfunding goals and enabling production of additional material on top of the core rulebook, and accessories such as a dice bag. By August 5, the campaign had surpassed $2.4M, overtaking both The One Ring Roleplaying Game's second edition as the highest earning Kickstarter campaign for a tabletop game system and the Dungeons & Dragons book Strongholds & Followers as the highest earning for tabletop games in general.

By August 16, the campaign had reached all planned crowdfunding goals: Magpie Games worked with ViacomCBS to develop further goals for the campaign, but noted that although they were trying to get them approved as quickly as possible, it would take some time, and they wanted to avoid feature creep and adding promises that could take away from the amount of polish they could dedicate to the game. When the campaign ended, 81,567 supporters had raised a total of $9.53M, making it the tenth highest funded campaign overall on Kickstarter, and the one with the ninth most individual pledges. Although Magpie Games assumed a certain level of success due to the popularity of the Avatar: The Last Airbender television series, they did not expect to raise more than $3M, and attributed a lot of the success to their online advertising, which targeted people outside of the role-playing game community. In addition to the advertising, a large portion of the budget was put toward printing and shipping, while another significant portion went toward the expenses involved in acquiring the license for the series, such as commissioning lawyers and agents. Following the campaign, the publisher continued accepting "late pledges".

A free quickstart e-book with basic rules and a description of the setting was released in July 2021 ahead of the crowdfunding campaign. The game's core rulebook was originally scheduled to be released digitally in February 2022, with supplementary books releasing in late 2022 and early 2023, but the release schedule was pushed back in part due to a cardboard shortage in the United States. The Digital Edition, Physical Edition, Wan Shi Tong's Adventure Guide expansion book and other items became available for pre-order on October 12, 2022, with the Digital Edition becoming available on October 26 and the other items planned to become available on or after January 25, 2023.

=== Books ===
Game books for Avatar Legends: The Roleplaying Game
Title	Digital release	Physical release	ISBN	Notes
Avatar Legends: The Roleplaying Game Quickstart	July 2021	-	—N/a	Quickstart rules, released as a free e-book
Avatar Legends: The Roleplaying Game	October 2022	January 2023	9781952885693	Core rulebook
Wan Shi Tong's Adventure Guide	October 2022	January 2023	9781952885709	Collection of adventures
Republic City	November 2023		9781959269083	Sourcebook about the Republic City setting from The Legend of Korra
Uncle Iroh's Adventure Guide	November 2024		9781959269120	Collection of adventures plus the Jasmine Island setting
The Spirit World	TBA		TBA	Sourcebook about the Spirit World setting

== Reception ==
Previewing the game, Dicebreaker thought that it would satisfy both viewers of the television series and players of role-playing games, considering it a beginner-friendly game that makes good use of the source material, and which elevates characters from basic fantasy to Avatar characters through the use of the balance track. They thought that it understands the storytelling structure of the television series well, and liked how it splits its setting into five eras, enabling many types of stories. They did consider the combat a weak point, describing it as the game's least well defined aspect. Players appreciated how the game is not a "reskinned" version of Dungeons & Dragons' fifth edition.

Avatar Legends: The Roleplaying Game won the 2023 Gold ENnie Awards for Best Rules and Best Family Game/Product.
