= Apocalypse Keys =

Tabletop mystery role-playing game

- Designers: Rae Nedjadi
- Publishers: Evil Hat Productions
- Publication: 2020; 6 years ago
- Genres: tabletop role-playing game, mystery
- Systems: Powered by the Apocalypse
- Skills: role-playing

Apocalypse Keys is a mystery tabletop role-playing game about monsters who decide to save the world, designed by Rae Nedjadi and published by Evil Hat Productions. It uses the Powered by the Apocalypse game engine by Meguey Baker and Vincent Baker. The game is inspired by Hellboy, Bureau for Paranormal Research and Defense, Men in Black, Penny Dreadful, and Doom Patrol.

== Gameplay ==
Players create monster characters based on emotional wounds instead of typical archetypes, and their world-saving organization operates like a queer chosen family. Nedjadi designed the game with emotional safety in mind, driven by the questions, “How do I build in a sense of narrative power that's not just in the GM’s hands? How do I build in this ability to communicate and collaborate?” The game is for three to six players and plays like a detective game.

== Reception ==
Chase Carter for Polygon named it one of seven most anticipated new tabletop games of 2023.

== Publication history ==
Nedjadi originally self-published Apocalypse Keys in pdf form on Itch.io in August 2020. Evil Hat Productions acquired publishing rights in March 2021 and ran a Kickstarter campaign for Apocalypse Keys in October 2023, raising $165,883 from 3,226 backers. Roll20 soon released a fully online version of the game. Evil Hat released the pdf version on Itch.io on April 19, 2023.
