= Whitney "Strix" Beltrán =

Writer and game designer

- Occupation: Narrative designer
- Notable work: Bluebeard's Bride
- Spouse: Ajit George

Whitney "Strix" Beltrán is a narrative designer and Project Narrative Director at Hidden Path Entertainment. Her writing and design career includes the indie role-playing game Bluebeard's Bride. She also founded the advocacy initiative Gaming as Other to promote inclusivity in the gaming community.

== Early life and education ==
Beltrán has said she started playing NES at a young age, playing RPG before she was a teenager, and was running game organizations in her early 20s. In graduate school, she studied mythology. As a PhD student, she conducted research for the game lab at the Carnegie Mellon Human-Computer Interaction Institute, and was advised by Jessica Hammer.

== Career ==
Beltrán has written for a variety of video games, including State of Decay 2 and Beyond Blue. She was the narrative designer for the 2020 augmented reality (AR) game, HoloVista, which she described as "a strange ode to post-modernism and Western capitalism, bathed in vaporwave-y aesthetics." In March 2021, it was announced she would be the narrative director for an upcoming open-world D&D video game by Hidden Path Entertainment. She was also a writer on the D&D campaign guide book Van Richten's Guide to Ravenloft (2021).

In July, 2023, it was announced that Beltrán would become the studio director for a new AAA studio, Dawon Entertainment, based in Bangalore, India, "building culturally focused games by Indian developers for Indian players, embracing India's captivating folklore, art, music, and cutting-edge technology sector." However, on May 10, 2024, Dawon announced on LinkedIn that its parent company, Prytania Media, had closed it.

=== Bluebeard's Bride ===
Beltrán wrote and designed the game with Marissa Kelly and Sarah Richardson, based on the Bluebeard fairy tale. After $130,000 was raised for development, and extensive research conducted by Beltrán and her coauthors into classic characters in western horror, Magpie Games released Bluebeard's Bride in October 2017 as a tabletop roleplaying game. In a review for Dread Central, Rachel Beck writes, "The story itself has the elegant simplicity of a fairytale," and it "is an explicitly feminine horror piece, and at its heart it's a game about systemic social and physical violence towards women." Sharang Biswas at Dicebreaker writes, "The point is for the players to fail, to experience what failure means. Through this, the game delivers its central ideas of feminist and feminine horror, using powerlessness as a game mechanic and employing supernatural hyperbole of real-world misogyny to highlight anti-feminist thought." Matt Baume, writing for Vice, writes that Beltrán and her coauthors "unpacked centuries of narrative tradition, and eventually distilled their feminine archetypes into Animus, which embodies strength; Virgin, representing obedience; Witch, suggesting sinfulness; Fatale, for sensuality; and a Mother who soothes." Magpie Games released Bluebeard's Bride: Book of Rooms in 2018, Bluebeard's Bride: Book of Lore and Bluebeard's Bride: Book of Mirrors in 2019, and Bluebeard's Bride: Booklet of Keepsakes in 2020.

== Gaming as Other ==
Gaming as Other is an initiative founded by Beltrán to promote inclusivity in the gaming community. Outreach has included panel discussions, short videos, and written commentary that advocates for inclusion in the gaming industry. Beltrán is also a member of The Diversity, Equity and Inclusion Committee (DEI) of the Science Fiction and Fantasy Writers of America.

== Works ==
- Jessica Hammer; Whitney Beltrán; Jonathan Walton; Moyra Turkington (April 17, 2018). "Power and Control in Role-Playing Games". In Zagal, José P.; Deterding, Sebastian (eds.). Role-Playing Game Studies. Taylor & Francis. ISBN 9781317268314.
- Whitney Beltrán (2013). "Shadow Work: A Jungian Perspective on the Underside of Live Action Role-Play in the United States". In Bowman, Sarah Lynne; Vanek, Aaron (eds.). Wryd Con Companion Book. Wryd Con.
- Whitney Beltrán (2012). "Yearning for the Hero Within: Live Action Role-Playing as Engagement with Mythical Archetypes". In Bowman, Sarah Lynne; Vanek, Aaron (eds.). Wryd Con Companion Book. Wryd Con.

== Honors and awards ==
- 2018 Game of the Year, Best Art, Indie Game Developer Network (Bluebeard's Bride)
- 2018 IndieCade Grand Jury Award (Bluebeard's Bride)
- 2019 ENnie Awards nominee, Best RPG Related Product (Bluebeard's Bride: Book of Lore)
- 2020 Presenter, 55th Annual Nebula Awards
- 2021 The Game Awards Future Class

== See also ==
- List of women in the video game industry
