= Thirsty Sword Lesbians =

2021 tabletop role-playing game

- Cover art by Kanesha Bryant.
- Designers: April Kit Walsh
- Illustrators: Avery Andruszkiewicz, Kanesha Bryant, Naomi Castro, Trivia Fox, Chelsea Geter, Kiku Hughes, Ryan Kingdom, Faith Schaffer, Hanna Templer
- Writers: Dominique Dickey, Jonaya Kemper, Alexis Sara, Rae Nedjadi, Whitney Delaglio
- Publishers: Evil Hat Productions
- Publication: 2021
- Genres: Fantasy; Science fiction; Cyberpunk; Steampunk
- Systems: Powered by the Apocalypse
- Players: 3–6
- Playing time: 2–4 hours
- Chance: Dice rolling
- Age range: 13+
- Media type: Role-playing games
- Website: evilhat.com/product/thirsty-sword-lesbians/

Thirsty Sword Lesbians is a narrative-focused tabletop role-playing game that emphasizes telling "melodramatic and queer stories". The game was funded via a 2020 Kickstarter campaign and published by Evil Hat Productions in 2021. It uses a modification of the Powered by the Apocalypse game system.

Thirsty Sword Lesbians was the first tabletop game to win a Nebula Award and the fourth winner in the "Best Game Writing" category. The game also won the 2022 ENNIE Awards for "Best Game" and "Product of the Year".

== Creative origins ==
The game was developed by Electronic Frontier Foundation attorney April Kit Walsh and illustrated by Kanesha Bryant; Walsh began development in 2017. Walsh wrote that her "primary inspiration was urgently wanting to tell stories about dashing queers having adventures and connecting emotionally and finding that the game I wanted wasn't out there yet".

Walsh told The Daily Dot that development began "slowly" due to her work as an attorney – the development of the game "was inspired partially from queer fanfiction, where LGBTQ writers can 'explore the feelings that never get represented by legacy media cartels'". In another interview, Walsh stated that the closest game inspirations for Thirsty Sword Lesbians were the indie role-playing games The Watch, Monsterhearts, and Masks, as

Each of them did something neat in using mechanics to evoke feelings and I wanted to adapt those elements and build on them. [...] I also adore the cadence of narrative down beats from low rolls and up beats or mixed beats from higher rolls. Being able to focus the mechanics on the narrative, rather than on tasks or simulation, is a design tool I really appreciate, and so is the randomness of the dice, to help tell stories that can surprise you.

== Publication history ==
In October 2020, Evil Hat Productions launched a Kickstarter campaign to fund the publication of Thirsty Sword Lesbians; the Kickstarter was fully funded within three hours of its launch. The final total raised by the Kickstarter when it closed on November 12, 2020, was $298,568, with 8,152 backers, which exceeded "its initial goal fifteen times over" and unlocked "nearly 50 stretch goals". It was also Evil Hat Productions' "second largest Kickstarter" to date. In an interview on EN World, Walsh highlighted that the core rulebook has "five contributing authors" and "two sensitivity consultants"; it also went through "rounds of playtests" to refine mechanics.

The game's scheduled delivery for backers was in June 2021. Evil Hat Productions stated that instead of delaying publication of Thirsty Sword Lesbians while stretch goal content was developed, the company "went forward with production and backers received their core copy of TSL five months ahead of schedule". Thirsty Sword Lesbians then had its wide release on DriveThruRPG, with both PDF and print-on-demand (POD) softcover editions, in June 2021. Evil Hat Productions also released the game as a tradebook.

The Kickstarter also funded community copies, (Note: Free copies available for people who cannot otherwise afford the game.) which are available on itch.io. The game has been released as part of bundles on itch.io to raise funds for various charitable causes such as support for trans rights in Texas and support for Ukrainians negatively affected by the ongoing Russian invasion.

== Expansions ==
In November 2021, Evil Hat Productions launched a Kickstarter campaign to fund the first expansion, titled Advanced Lovers & Lesbians. The expansion adds 10 new character playbooks and 21 new settings to the game. The expansion's 29 writers included Alex Roberts, Avery Alder, Banana Chan, Emily Care Boss, Jonaya Kemper, and Lucian Kahn. Dicebreaker highlighted that "initially a collection of stretch goals for the original RPG's Kickstarter campaign, Advanced Lovers & Lesbians has since become its own 272 page expansion that players and games masters can use to alter and enhance their sessions of the game". The two-week-long Kickstarter had raised a total of $97,403, with 1,762 backers, when it closed on November 23, 2021; the expansion had an estimated delivery of March 2022 for backers. This Kickstarter campaign also included a hardcover edition of Thirsty Sword Lesbians.

On May 16, 2022, Advanced Lovers & Lesbians was released in PDF, POD softcover, and hardcover editions.

== Game system ==
Thirsty Sword Lesbians is a narrative-focused role-playing game built on the Powered by the Apocalypse game framework. Adventures are run by the Gaymaster. Player characters can enact various defined "Moves" during a scene: Moves fall into several categories, such as Danger Moves, Heartstring Moves, Recovery Moves, and Special Moves. Characters can also gain narrative "Strings", which "represent emotional influence over another person. This could be the affection of a friend or lover, or it could be blackmail material". Characters can spend Strings as a Move to influence other player and non-player characters.

The base game includes nine queer-coded character archetypes: Beast, Chosen, Devoted, Infamous, Nature Witch, Scoundrel, Seeker, Spooky Witch, and Trickster. "Each of these character types comes with its own strengths and weaknesses, with players needing to work together to cope with whatever emotional, romantic and personality issues they may face throughout their adventure". Ana Valens, for The Daily Dot, commented that "player characters don't actually have to seek each other out sexually or romantically. Thirst can be purely platonic. Swords and lesbians are also optional offerings, as players can switch these out with all sorts of weapons, sexual orientations, and gender identities".

Characters have five main stats: daring, grace, heart, wit, and spirit. The game also has rules for fighting, flirts, and zingers – players can use these to escalate or defuse conflict. Alex Meehan, for Dicebreaker, explained that "whatever players decide to do, they will have to attempt to roll for success, with the outcome determined by the combined total of the dice roll and their chosen modifier. Should a player experience an unfortunate event, they could suffer from a nasty variety of conditions [...] which they'll have to seek out a source of emotional closeness in order to cure". Conditions are both physical and emotional challenges; these emotional conditions have "both narrative and mechanical effects", including adding a penalty to dice rolls.

The game emphasizes playing with safety tools. Walsh stated that:

Participating in romantic role-play can be very emotional and requires communication and respect for boundaries that aren't necessarily in everyone's personal toolkit when they show up for a game. Thirsty Sword Lesbians builds consent and collaboration into the mechanics, as well as centering safety and communication practices that help groups explore more emotional themes.

The Lines and Veils safety tool was originally created by Ron Edwards and The X-Card safety tool by John Stavropoulos. The sourcebook outlines both of these safety tools and introduces a new safety tool called the Palette, which "not only includes consent, but story elements, tone, and overall playstyle that everyone establishes in a pre-game discussion and can get changed during play as players are encouraged to frequently check in with each other to make sure everyone is still on board".

== Reception ==
Richard Jansen-Parkes, for the UK print magazine Tabletop Gaming in 2021, highlighted that "the name makes it clear that this is going to be a game about romance [...], about sword fights, and about being super, mega gay" and that the sourcebook contains "just over a dozen sketched-out settings" spanning "almost every genre you could imagine". Jansen-Parkes commented that "the scope of Thirsty Sword Lesbian adventures is something near limitless". He wrote that the biggest modification to the Powered by the Apocalypse system is "the use of 'strings' – tokens that represent emotional influence over another person. These are the fuel that keeps the romantic bonfire burning, and while the practicalities of the system can be a little fiddly – if you have a large cast of NPCs you can end up with masses of different tokens – it does a stellar job of keeping the table focused on kisses as well as the adventures". Jansen-Parkes commented that Thirsty Sword Lesbians isn't a game for everyone, but if "you want something joyously fun and disastrously romantic to play, this might be just the game you want".

Mey Rude, for The Advocate in 2022, called Thirsty Sword Lesbians "a heavily customizable game" with the goal of building relationships instead of fighting bad guys or rescuing princesses; Rude commented that players experienced with Powered by the Apocalypse games should find this game easy to pick up. Rude wrote that there are nine character types, and characters "can adapt to any kind of flirting style, whether it's sexually charged sword fights, hilariously intense pun battles, or deep and dramatic heart-to-hearts. Even if you don't like romantic or sexual flirting, you can still play the game and make it about friend flirting and building a chosen family". Rude also highlighted that "the game is loaded with sexy and stylish art. [...] The books are worth the purchase just to look at the gorgeous sapphic art inside them. It's filled with a variety of women, queers, and lesbians in a wide variety of situations".

Alex Meehan, for Eurogamer in 2022, highlighted that the game's world is geared towards "intense melodrama and extravagance" and that it celebrates "the antics of disaster lesbians". Meehan commented that "if players are not fighting, then they're probably flirting. Sometimes, player characters are doing both at the same time. [...] Its goal is not to produce realistic portrayals of lesbian characters – most gay women don't brandish swords and stash hidden tools about their person, unfortunately – but to provide an outlet for players to embrace a messier, but undoubtedly more fun, side of themselves. [...] Thirsty Sword Lesbians is special because it's explicitly a TRPG about celebrating queerness". Meehan also praised the game's safety tools.

Hylke Jorrit Langhout, for Gayming Magazine in 2022, rated the game 3.5 out of 5. Langhout praised the game's safety tools, such as the new Palette tool, and the writing of the book; they highlighted that the sourcebook includes a glossary of "queer terminology and a special section devoted to how to respectfully tell trans stories". Langhout wrote that "keeping the language fun and inclusive throughout shows a genuine commitment to making sure Thirsty Sword Lesbians can be played by as many people as possible without compromising its vision of a game for queer stories". Langhout found explanations of some mechanics, such as the Strings mechanic, confusing; in their test session, their group found the Strings mechanic "difficult to use during play". Langhout commented that playing as the Gamemaster is a very "different experience" from other games as the Gamemaster needs "to be comfortable running lots of NPCs that can be romantically appealing to the player characters .... There are guidelines for adjusting the rules to accommodate not playing with a lot of romance, but the default rules do assume a large amount of flirting and romantic connection, so that's how we played". Langhout respects Thirsty Sword Lesbians "because it knows exactly what it wants from its players, and if my group wasn't a good fit for it, that's not the game's fault".

Thirsty Sword Lesbians was included on Kotaku's "The 10 Best Tabletop Roleplaying Books Of 2022" list – Claire Jackson commented that "the game offers a suite of really cool settings to choose from, be they sci-fi, fantasy, or even 'Sparkle Heart Magic Force Go!' There's some traditional TTRPG structure for those familiar. A GM, Gaymaster in this game, and a group of player characters tell a collaborative story of thrilling heroics, but it's one that urges you to 'follow your heart,' and not get so bogged down in the intricate details of planning out an adventure or campaign as is often the case in this hobby. This is a wonderful and very inviting gay-as-hell game that can serve as the basis for an ongoing campaign, or just a ruleset you turn to when you and a bunch of queer friends want to make some narrative noise".

The game was No. 8 on CBR's 2022 "10 LGBTQ+ TTRPGs To Play With Your Friends This Pride Month" list – Rebekah Krum highlighted that "this Nebula Award winner includes exactly what the name would suggest: sapphic swashbucklers taking on alluring enemies and making emotional connections with the people around them. Thirsty Sword Lesbians has nine character types for players to choose from, each centering on a particular kind of emotional strife. The beautifully illustrated Thirsty Sword Lesbians sourcebook includes various setting options and story seeds for gaming tables to build off of and turn into adventures".

=== Awards and nominations ===
With Gayming Magazine, it was nominated for LGBTQ Tabletop Game.

Year	Award	Category	Work	Result	Ref.
2022	Nebula Awards	Best Game Writing	Thirsty Sword Lesbians	Won	
2022	ENNIE Awards	Best Art, Cover	Thirsty Sword Lesbians	Nominated	
2022	ENNIE Awards	Best Art, Interior	Thirsty Sword Lesbians	Nominated	
2022	ENNIE Awards	Best Game	Thirsty Sword Lesbians	Gold Winner	
2022	ENNIE Awards	Product of the Year	Thirsty Sword Lesbians	Gold Winner	
