= Monster of the Week =

Horror role-playing game

- Designers: Michael Sands
- Illustrators: Eric Quigley (cover); Daniel Gorringe (interior); Juan Ochoa (interior); Kurt Komoda (interior)
- Publishers: Evil Hat Productions
- Publication: 2012; 14 years ago
- Years active: 2012–present
- Genres: Urban fantasy; horror
- Languages: English; Portuguese; French; Spanish; Polish; Catalan; German
- Systems: Powered by the Apocalypse
- Players: 2–5
- Playing time: Varies
- Chance: Medium (dice rolling)
- Skills: Improvisation; role-playing; arithmetic
- Materials required: Two six-sided dice; pen and paper
- Media type: Book
- Website: genericgames.co.nz/motw/
- ISBN: 9781613170915 2015 Revised Edition

Monster of the Week (MOTW) is an urban fantasy-horror tabletop role-playing game developed by Michael Sands. It was first published in 2012, and a revised edition was published by Evil Hat Productions in 2015, who have since published the game and its supplemental materials. The game was inspired by villain of the week television series such as Buffy the Vampire Slayer, Supernatural, and The X-Files.

MOTW is a Powered by the Apocalypse game and as such has a simplified ruleset when compared to tabletop RPGs like Dungeons & Dragons or Cyberpunk.

== Gameplay ==
MOTW is a semi-structured, open-ended tabletop role-playing game (TTRPG). One player acts as the gamemaster (known as the "Keeper of Monsters and Mysteries" or "Keeper") while the other players develop player characters and take the role of one or two "hunters".

Each hunter is assigned a "playbook" or character class based on a character archetype from monster media. During the course of play, each player will direct the actions of their character and roll two six-sided dice when prompted by the Keeper to use various skills, including investigating mysteries and using magic, as well skills that are specific to individual playbooks. Unlike other TTRPGs, the Keeper does not roll dice to determine the actions of the characters under their control; instead, the Keeper reacts to the rolls of the hunters. Each player will employ logic, basic arithmetic, and imagination during the course of the game. A single game may finish in one playing session or be extended over the course of multiple playing sessions in an "arc" or "campaign".

Enemies, settings, and puzzles are developed by the Keeper in advance of the playing session. The Keeper determines what the results of player choices are according to the rules of the game and their interpretation of those rules. MOTW has been described as a "fiction-first" game, with a greater emphasis on storytelling than adhering to rules.

== History ==
MOTW was first published by Michael Sands in 2012. In an interview with Dicebreaker, Sands said the game was inspired by television series such as Supernatural, Buffy the Vampire Slayer, and The X-Files. Following the release of Apocalypse World, Sands adapted that system to create MOTW. After its release, MOTW was primarily available via print on demand, which limited its potential audience. In 2015, Sands, at the encouragement of Fred Hicks, partnered with Evil Hat Productions to make a revised edition of the game and publish it through the company's platform. Sands developed a rules expansion and collection of ready-to-play mysteries, The Tome of Mysteries, which was released in 2019. A new hardcover edition in 2022 incorporated new art, some optional rules from The Tome of Mysteries, and a couple of playbooks previously only available for individual download; digital editions were updated to include this material as well. Sands also worked with Marek Golonka, who contributed to The Tome of Mysteries, to develop The Codex of Worlds, a second expansion book with new party mechanics and alternate settings, which was released in hardcover in September 2023.

== Reception ==
MOTW has had a generally positive critical reception since its release, with reviewers lauding its quick pacing and accessibility for new tabletop gamers. R. Talsorian Games designer Cody Pondsmith wrote of MOTW in 2022: "Monster of the Week's streamlined resolution system allows you to focus on playing your character and moving the story forward without getting slowed down by additive math and complex rules." PC Gamer's Robin Valentine described the game as, "a great introduction to the world of game driven by collaboration and improv at the table."

Criticism of MOTW has primarily been related to its open-ended ruleset, about which Pondsmith wrote, "the trade-off is that the game relies heavily on the game master to adjudicate when rolls should be made and what the results of those rolls should be, but the open-ended system gives solid guidance when things get tricky."

== In popular culture ==
MOTW has been featured in multiple actual play podcasts since its creation, most notably as the system used in Season 2 of The Adventure Zone.
