= Dungeon World =

Tabletop fantasy role-playing game

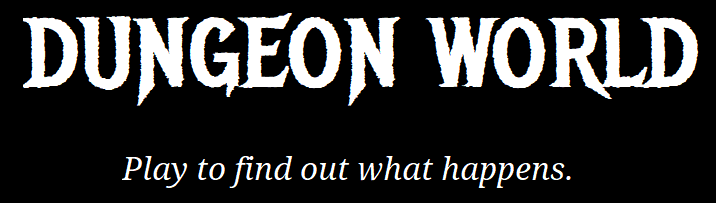
- Designers: Sage LaTorra; Adam Koebel
- Publishers: Sage Kobold Productions, RNDM Games
- Publication: 2012; 14 years ago
- Genres: Fantasy
- Systems: Powered by the Apocalypse

Dungeon World is a tabletop fantasy roleplaying game created by Sage LaTorra and Adam Koebel. The game uses the Powered by the Apocalypse engine originally designed for Apocalypse World and used in Monsterhearts and other games. The game is advertised as having old school style with modern rules. The text of the game was released under the Creative Commons Attribution 3.0 Unported License.

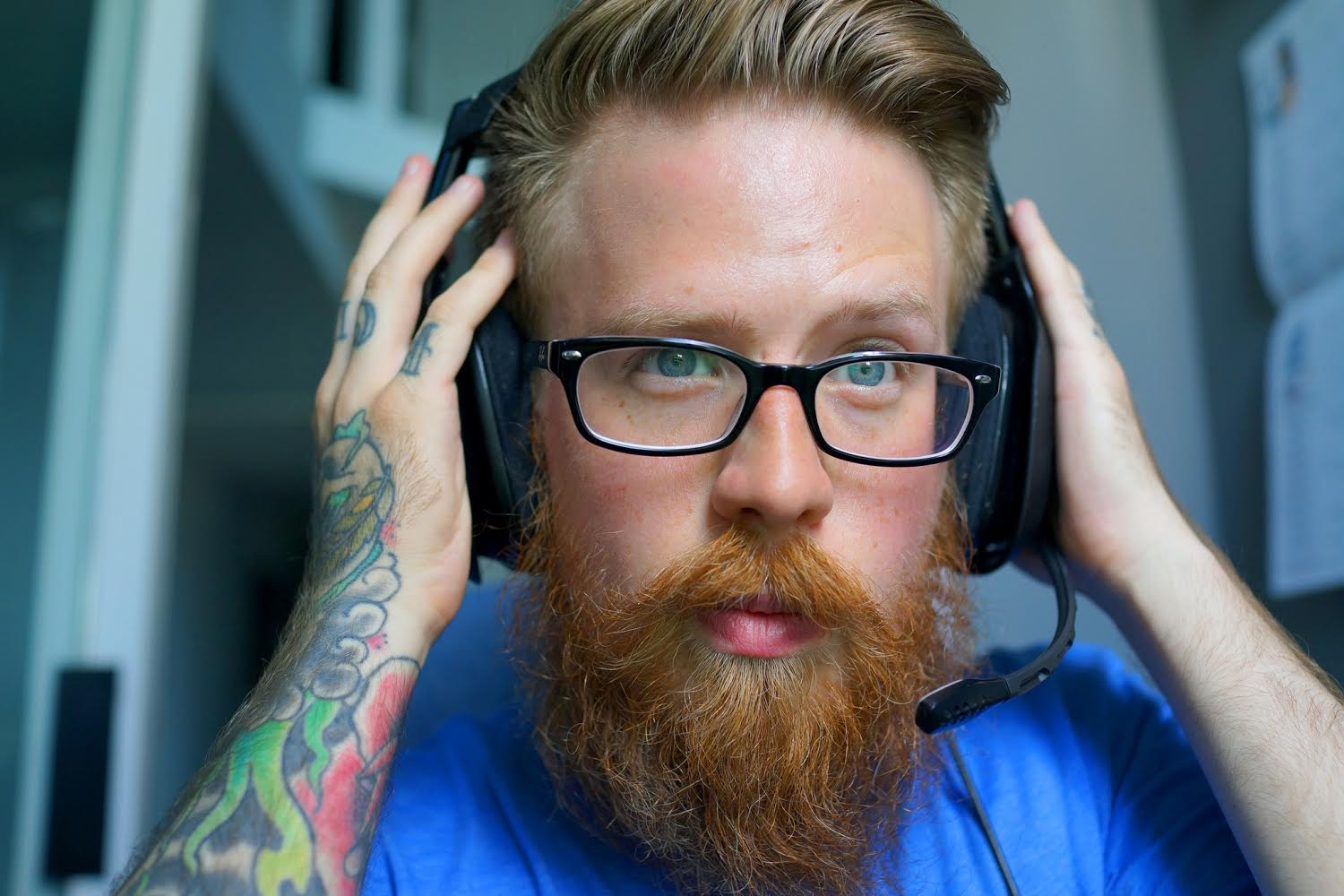
Adam Koebel in 2014

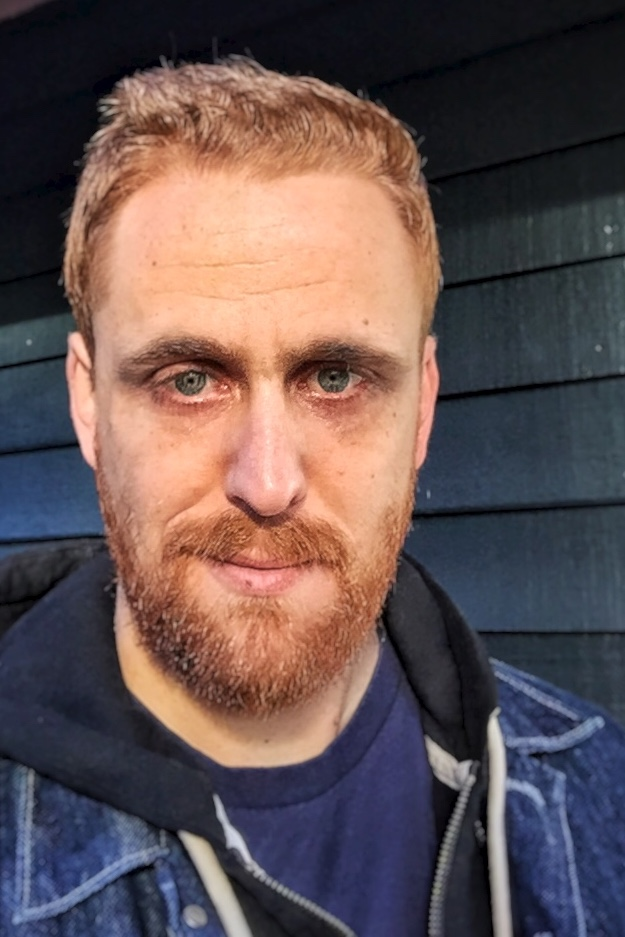
Sage LaTorra in 2014

Dungeon World raised just over $80,000 from 2400 backers on Kickstarter before it was released.

As of 2026, a second edition of the game is currently in development.

== Setting ==
The setting for Dungeon World is created by the game master following the instruction of "Draw maps and leave blank spaces" allowing details to emerge in play.

== Gameplay ==
Dungeon World uses the Powered by the Apocalypse engine. The game uses six ability scores (Strength, Dexterity, Constitution, Intelligence, Wisdom, Charisma) and a character class model with choices of Bard, Cleric, Fighter, Immolator, Paladin, Ranger, Thief, or Wizard.

Like other Powered by the Apocalypse games, actions in Dungeon World are called moves. When a player character makes a move, the player rolls two six-sided dice and adds the appropriate ability modifier. On a result of 10+ the move succeeds without complication. On a result of 7-9 the move partially succeeds or succeeds with a problem, allowing the GM to make a move of their own. On a result of 6 or less there is trouble (which may or may not mean failure). The character gains an experience point and the GM makes a move. Characters share general moves and gain unique moves from their class.

To represent character relationships and facilitate quick setup, each class lists bonds that show, before the game starts, how the characters see each other, filling one name of one other player character in the blank space of each bond. Example bonds are:

- _______________ owes me their life, whether they admit it or not.
- I have sworn to protect _______________.
- I worry about the ability of _______________ to survive in the dungeon.
- _______________ is soft, but I will make them hard like me.

The full rules for Dungeon World were released in a Dungeon World SRD.

== History ==
Dungeon World was developed starting in 2010 and an introductory edition was brought to Gen Con Indy 2011. Fundraising for the game itself begun via Kickstarter in mid 2012. More than a year after being launched it was still the eighth fastest current seller at DriveThruRPG.

=== Second Edition ===
In 2024, the rights to Dungeon World were purchased by Luke Crane and John Dimatos, who began development on a second edition of the game.

== Reception ==
Dungeon World was the 2012 Golden Geek RPG of the Year, the 2012 Indie RPG Game of the Year (as well as winning the awards for Best Support and Best Production) and was the Best Rules Gold Winner in the 2013 Ennie Awards.
