= Sine Requie =

2003 video game

- Designers: Matteo Cortini and Leonardo Moretti
- Publishers: Rose & Poison - Asterion Press
- Publication: 2003 (Sine Requie); 2007 (Sine Requie Anno XIII); 2016 (Sine Requie Anno XIII, Seconda edizione)
- Years active: 2003-present
- Genres: Horror
- Systems: Own
- Playing time: Varies
- Chance: Tarots
- Skills: Role-playing, improvisation.
- Website: https://www.serpentarium.net/

Sine Requie (Latin words for "No rest","Restless") is an Italian horror role-playing game, written by Matteo Cortini and Leonardo Moretti and whose first edition was published in 2003 by Rose & Poison. The second edition has been released by Asterion Press in 2007 and it goes by the name "Sine Requie Anno XIII" ("Sine Requie the 13th Year"). The third edition has been released by Serpentarium in 2016 and it goes by the name "Sine Requie Anno XIII, Second Edition".

== Play Overview ==
=== Game History ===
Sine Requie was the winner of the "Best of Show" as the best Italian game at the Lucca Comics and Games convention, at its debut in 2003.

A second edition, with a rigid and more artistic cover, named "Sine Requie Anno XIII" was published in 2007 by Asterion Press, winning the "Best of Show" award as Best Role Playing Game and the "GMM Award", again as Best Role Playing Game in 2008. The first "Anno XIII" module, "Sanctum Imperium Anno XIII" ("Holy Empire the 13th Year"), won the "Side Award" at Lucca Comics and Games in 2008 for "Best Artistic Layout".

=== Game System ===
The most well-known peculiarity of this game is the use of tarots as a mechanic instead of dice rolling like classic pen and paper RPGs. Minor Arcana are used for most ability tests and actions, while Major Arcana allow for more abstract and narrative gameplay, with the players and the game master freely switching to either or both according to their taste.

== Setting ==
The game is set in an alternative 1957, 13 years after what is remembered as "The Judgment Day": 6 June 1944 (also known, in the real world, as the "D-Day"), the day in which human history changed forever.

While the fiercest war ever was raging, the Second World War, the Dead rose from their graves to devour the living and to wreak havoc on them. Many nations did not have the strength to counteract the violence and crumbled before the insane hunger of those that were once living beings. Only a few survivors lasted in those wastelands, where "life" had changed her name to "nightmare". 13 years after, almost all the world lies in ruins, with what remains of mankind living in a constant state of terror between the unstoppable hunger of the Dead and the horrors of the worst dictatorships and regimes ever existed.

=== Lost Lands ===
The Lost Lands are by now rotten deserts where thin bunches of men and women, either audacious or on the brink of madness, live from day to day. It is a place where finding water or provisions can costs one's life, and the ground is scratched by the crawling steps of hordes of the Dead and other dreadful creatures. Some nations with strong leaders were able to hold out, establishing totalitarian regimes.

=== Fourth Reich ===
The Third Reich, claiming victory in World War II, took the name of IV Reich (The Fourth Reich). In these territories, ruled by the Nazi regime, life is regulated by rigid and cruel laws, and personal liberty is only a dream. The cities, surrounded by fortified walls, are the same as they were ten years before, and nothing appears to be different. People live unaware of the horror that crawls outside the cities' borders. Gestapo soldiers patrol the streets to maintain public order, instilling an atmosphere of terror and suffering. Ferocious SS Platoons deport more and more citizens to the Reeducation Camps, from where nobody ever returns. In the name of a new religion risen from the ashes of Christianity, churches are desecrated and converted to shrines of the new Führer-Messiah who will once again lead the Reich to global conquest.

=== Sanctum Imperium ===
In Italy, after the fall of the fascist regime, a rigid theocracy was imposed, ruled by Pope Leone XIV. This new state has returned Italy to the medieval period, with the Church claiming the awakening of the dead is but the beginning of the incoming biblical Apocalypse and officially beginning preparations for the final days. Most modern technology has been abolished or is only in the hands of a privileged few. The Italian territories appear to be anachronistic places, where old cars stand beside pyres of a new inquisition. Templars in shining armour fight alongside Hunters of the undead, veterans of the world war, to defend the population. In the Papal State, the fervent religious fanaticism has brought a ferocious fight to heresies and to all that is "anti-papal".

=== Soviet ===
The Russian civilization survived the horror but at the cost of extreme changes. Giant metal cities, immense mazes of towers and corridors extend from the depth of the earth to the sky, while, from the untiring factories, the first bio-machines were born, the monstrous forefront of a new humanity. This is Soviet, the realm of the sentient machine Z.A.R., an inhuman dictator of a technocracy that had decreed the end of concepts like family, religion, peace and rest. Not even sunlight is granted to the slave citizens of the Calculator, and the days have lost their value and changed their length to submit to the rigid and precise rhythms of the bio-machine factories.

=== The Reign Of Osiris ===
In Egypt the Pharaohs came back from their tombs with unimaginable powers, and now they govern a society based on their old reigns. Ramses III guides the new Egypt with its living and dead servants, while the rebel Pharaohs of Ombos, breeders of humans, plot to undermine the ruler from its throne.

== Game materials ==
Sine Requie, Anno XIII, Seconda edizione (third edition, Serpentarium)

- (2016) Sine Requie Anno XIII, Seconda Edizione - Manuale base della terza edizione di Sine Requie (b/n, cartonato)
- (2016) Sanctum Imperium Seconda edizione - Ristampa di Sanctum Imperium+Gli Occhi del Serpente (b/n, cartonato)
- (2017) IV Reich Seconda edizione - Ristampa di IV Reich+avventure del Reich di Olocausto di Terrore (b/n, cartonato)
- (2017) Schermo del Cartomante Seconda edizione - Contiene due avventure ambientate nel Paese dei Balocchi e nel Sanctum Imperium
- (2017) Soviet Seconda edizione - Ristampa di Soviet+moduli Urlo dell'Abisso e Vodzene (b/n, cartonato)
- (2017) Anno 0 il Giorno del Giudizio - manuale riguardante il Giorno del Giudizio (b/n, cartonato)
- (2018) Braccamorte - manuale riguardante la setta dei Braccamorte (b/n, cartonato, copertina con foglia d'oro)
- (2018) Regno delle Ombre - manuale riguardante la setta del Regno delle Ombre (b/n, cartonato, copertina con foglia d'oro)
- (2019) Gladiatori - manuale riguardante i Gladiatori nel Soviet (b/n, cartonato, copertina con foglia d'oro)
- (2019) Trono del Crisantemo Seconda edizione - Manuale riguardante il Giappone (b/n, cartonato)

Sine Requie, Anno XIII (second edition, Asterion Press)

- (2007) Sine Requie Anno XIII - Manuale base della seconda edizione di Sine Requie (b/n, cartonato, 256 pag.)
- (2007) Tarocchi di Sine Requie - Mazzo con i 22 Arcani Maggiori, disegnati da Elia Morettini.
- (2008) Schermo del Cartomante - Schermo di gioco per Sine Requie.
- (2008) Sanctum Imperium Anno XIII - Manuale riguardante il Regno del Papa (b/n, cartonato, 160 pag.)
- (2009) Tarocchi del Giudizio - Mazzo con i 22 Arcani Maggiori e i 56 Arcani Minori, disegnati da Elia Morettini.
- (2009) IV Reich - Manuale riguardante il quarto Reich (b/n, cartonato)
- (2010) Olocausto di Terrore - Manuale con avventure ambientate nel Reich e nelle Terre Perdute (b/n, cartonato)
- (2010) Soviet - Manuale riguardante il soviet (b/n, cartonato)
- (2010) Sopravvissuti - Romanzo ambientato nelle Terre Perdute (b/n, soft cover)
- (2011) L'Urlo dell'Abisso - Manuale con avventure ambientate nel Soviet(b/n, cartonato)
- (2011) Vodzene - Manuale con campagna ambientata nel Soviet(b/n, cartonato)
- (2011) Terre Perdute - Manuale riguardante le Terre Perdute (b/n, cartonato)
- (2012) Occhi del Serpente - Manuale con avventure ambientate nel Sanctum Imperium(b/n, cartonato)
- (2012) Regno di Osiride - Manuale riguardante il Regno di Osiride (b/n, cartonato)
- (2013) Tomo dei Morti Volume I - Manuale riguardante i Morti (b/n, cartonato)
- (2013) U.S.A. Anno XIII - Manuale riguardante gli Stati Uniti (b/n, cartonato)
- (2014) Tomo dei Morti Volume II - Manuale riguardante i Morti (b/n, cartonato)
- (2014) Trono del Crisantemo - Manuale riguardante il Giappone (b/n, cartonato)
- (2015) Tomo delle Creature - Manuale riguardante i Morti (b/n, cartonato)
- (2015) Il Paese dei Balocchi - Manuale base riguardante i Burattini (b/n, cartonato)
- (2016) Tarocchi del Paese dei Balocchi - Mazzo con i 22 Arcani Maggiori.

Sine Requie (first edition, Rose & Poison)

- (2003) La Creazione - Manuale del Personaggio(b/n, spillato, 50 pag.)
- (2003) Il Giudizio - Manuale del Cartomante (b/n, spillato 50 pag).
- (2003) IV Reich - Manuale riguardante il Reich (b/n, spillato, 32 pag.)
- (2003) Sanctum Imperium - manuale riguardante il Regno del Papa (b/n, 28 pag.)
- (2004) Soviet - Manuale riguardante la Russia (b/n, spillato, 48 pag.)
- (2004) Gli Occhi del Serpente - Manuale di avventura nel Sanctum Imperium (b/n, 64 pag.)
- (2005) Terre Perdute - Manuale riguardante le zone in balia dei Morti (b/n, brossurato, 90 pag.)
- (2005) Urla dal Silenzio - Manuale di avventure scritte dai fans (b/n, spillato, 32 pag.)
- (2006) Regno di Osiride - Manuale riguardante l'Egitto (b/n, spillato, 60 pag.)
- (2006) Urla dal Silenzio 2 - Manuale di avventure scritte dai fans (b/n, spillato, 32 pag.)
