= Indie RPG Awards =

Annual award for role-playing games

The Indie RPG Awards were annual, creator-based awards for Indie role-playing games and supplements. They were established in 2002 by Andy Kitkowski. The final round of awards was given in 2017.

For the purposes of the Awards, there exists a following "definition" of an Indie role-playing game:

- A game where the creator is the person who has written at least 50% of the actual game content.
- A game where the creator has full control of content and publishing.
- A game where the creator is the publisher, with full control over expenses and profits.

== Categories ==
The following categories for nominations have been used throughout the history of the awards:

- Indie Game of the Year - the main award for Indie Games.
- Indie Supplement of the Year - for best Supplement for an Indie Game.
- Best Free Game - for free Indie Games.
- Best Support - for the publisher has best supported a previously published game or supplement.
- Best Production - for best written and most attractive Indie Games.
- Most Innovative Game - for games that stretch the RPG experience in new ways.

Additional categories were awarded in the first years of the awards:

- Best Use of the d20 License - presented only in 2002
- Indie RPG Zine of the Year - presented only in 2002
- Best Synergy - a game with a synergistic relationship between the setting and the rules; presented only in 2002 and 2003.
- Indie RPG "Human of the Year" - for Indie RPG creators and supporters; presented only in 2002 and 2003.
- Andy's Choice Award - determined by the originator of the awards; presented only in 2002, 2003 and 2004.
- People's Choice Award - decided by popular vote for best game and best supplement; presented only in 2004.

== Winners ==
=== 2002 ===
- Indie Game of the Year: Dust Devils by Matt Snyder
- Indie Supplement of the Year: Charnel Gods by Ron Edwards
- Best Free Game: Nicotine Girls by Paul Czege
- Best Use of the d20 License: The Kid's Colouring Book o Critters - Celebrity Edition by M. Jason Parent
- Best Production: Children of the Sun by Lewis Pollack
- Best Support: The Riddle of Steel by Jacob Norwood
- Best Synergy: Dust Devils
- Most Innovative Game: Universalis by Ralph Mazza and Mike Holmes
- Indie RPG "Human of the Year": Ron Edwards
- Indie RPG Zine of the Year: The Shadowrun Supplemental
- Andy's Choice: Charnel Gods by Scott Knipe

=== 2003 ===
- Indie Game of the Year: My Life with Master by Paul Czege
- Indie Supplement of the Year: JAGS Have-Not
- Best Free Game: FATE by Fred Hicks
- Best Production: My Life with Master
- Best Support: FATE
- Best Synergy: My Life with Master
- Most Innovative Game: My Life with Master
- Indie RPG "Human of the Year": Luke Crane (spelled as Power of the Year)
- Andy's Choice: FATE

=== 2004 ===
- Indie Game of the Year: Dogs in the Vineyard by D. Vincent Baker
- Indie Supplement of the Year: Monster Burner by Luke Crane
- Best Free Game: The Shadow of Yesterday by Clinton R. Nixon
- People's Choice - Best Game: Dead Inside by Chad Underkoffler
- People's Choice - Best Supplement: Monster Burner
- Best Production: A/State by Malcolm Craig
- Best Support: Monster Burner
- Most Innovative Game: Dogs in the Vineyard
- Andy's Choice: Primetime Adventures by Matt Wilson

=== 2005 ===
- Indie Game of the Year: Polaris by Ben Lehman
- Indie Supplement of the Year: Burning Sands: Jihad by Luke Crane
- Best Free Game: Perfect20 by Levi Kornelsen
- Best Production: Artesia by Mark Smylie
- Best Support: Truth & Justice by Chad Underkoffler
- Most Innovative Game: Polaris

=== 2006 ===
- Indie Game of the Year: Spirit of the Century by Fred Hicks
- Indie Supplement of the Year: Dictionary of Mu by Judd Carlman
- Best Free Game: JAGS Revised by Marco Chacon
- Best Production: Burning Empires by Luke Crane
- Best Support: Burning Empires
- Most Innovative Game: Lacuna Part 1, second attempt by Jared Sorensen

=== 2007 ===
- Indie Game of the Year: Grey Ranks by Jason Morningstar
- Indie Supplement of the Year: The Blossoms are Falling by Luke Crane
- Best Free Game: Classroom Deathmatch by Jake Diamond and Matt Schlotte
- Best Production: Reign by Greg Stolze
- Best Support: The Blossoms are Falling
- Most Innovative Game: Grey Ranks

=== 2008 ===
- Indie Game of the Year: Mouse Guard Roleplaying Game by Luke Crane and David Petersen
- Indie Supplement of the Year: Don't Lose Your Mind by Benjamin Baugh
- Best Free Game: (tie) Sea Dracula by Jake Richmond and Nick Smith and Sufficiently Advanced by Colin Fredericks
- Best Production: Mouse Guard
- Best Support: Mouse Guard
- Most Innovative Game: Sweet Agatha by Kevin Allen Jr.

=== 2009 ===
- Indie Game of the Year: Kagematsu by Danielle Lewon
- Indie Supplement of the Year: The Day after Ragnarok by Kenneth Hite
- Best Free Game: Lady Blackbird: Adventures in the Wild Blue Yonder by John Harper
- Best Production: Lady Blackbird: Adventures in the Wild Blue Yonder
- Best Support: Fiasco by Jason Morningstar
- Most Innovative Game: A Penny for My Thoughts by Paul Tevis

=== 2010 ===
- Indie Game of the Year: Apocalypse World by D. Vincent Baker
- Indie Supplement of the Year: The Hot War Transmission by Malcolm Craig and Scott Dorward
- Best Free Game: Stars Without Number by Kevin Crawford
- Best Production: Freemarket by Luke Crane and Jared Sorensen
- Best Support: Apocalypse World
- Most Innovative Game: Apocalypse World

=== 2011 ===
- Indie Game of the Year: Do: Pilgrims of the Flying Temple by Daniel Solis
- Indie Supplement of the Year: Fiasco Companion by Jason Morningstar and Steve Segedy
- Best Free Game: Anima Prime by Christian Griffen
- Best Production: Do: Pilgrims of the Flying Temple
- Best Support: Fiasco Companion
- Most Innovative Game: Do: Pilgrims of the Flying Temple

=== 2012 ===
- Indie Game of the Year: Dungeon World by Sage LaTorra and Adam Koebel
- Indie Supplement of the Year: American Disasters (for Fiasco) by Jason Morningstar and Steve Segedy
- Best Free Game: Mythender by Ryan Macklin
- Best Production: Dungeon World
- Best Support: Dungeon World
- Most Innovative Game: Dog Eat Dog by Liam Burke

=== 2013 ===
- Indie Game of the Year: Hillfolk by Robin D. Laws
- Indie Supplement of the Year: Adventures on Dungeon Planet by Johnstone Metzger
- Best Production: Torchbearer by Thor Olavsrud and Luke Crane
- Best Support: Hillfolk
- Most Innovative Game: The Quiet Year by Avery Alder

=== 2014 ===
- Indie Game of the Year: The Clay That Woke by Paul Czege
- Indie Supplement of the Year: Deep Carbon Observatory by Patrick Stewart, Scrap Princess
- Best Free Game: Dream Askew by Avery Alder
- Best Production: A Red and Pleasant Land by Zak S.
- Best Support: Deep Carbon Observatory
- Most Innovative Game: The Clay That Woke

=== 2015 ===
- Indie Game of the Year: Night Witches by Jason Morningstar
- Indie Supplement of the Year: Fiasco Playset Anthology by Bully Pulpit Games
- Best Free Game: Sign by Hakan Seyalioglu and Kathryn Hymes
- Best Production: Fall of Magic by Ross Cowman
- Best Support: World Wide Wrestling RPG by Nathan D. Paoletta
- Most Innovative Game: Fall of Magic

=== 2016 ===
- Indie Game of the Year: Blades in the Dark by John Harper
- Indie Supplement of the Year: Microscope Explorer by Ben Robbins
- Best Free Game: Quill: A Letter-Writing Roleplaying Game for a Single Player by Scott Malthouse
- Best Production: Blades in the Dark by John Harper
- Best Support: Blades in the Dark by John Harper
- Most Innovative Game: #Feminism: A Nano-Game Anthology edited by Misha Bushyager, Lizzie Stark, and Anna Westerling

=== 2017 ===
- Indie Game of the Year: The Watch by Anna Kreider and Andrew Medeiros
- Indie Supplement of the Year: Itras By: The Menagerie by Ole Peder Giaver and others
- Best Production:Timewatch by Kevin Kulp and others
- Best Support: Timewatch
- Most Innovative Game: Alas for the Awful Sea by Hayley Gordon, Vee Hendro
