= Meguey Baker =

American roleplaying game designer

- Born: 1971 (age 54–55); Upstate New York, USA
- Education: Hampshire College (BA)
- Occupations: Game designer, curator, and historian
- Notable work: Apocalypse World, Powered by the Apocalypse
- Spouse: Vincent Baker
- Awards: 2010 Indie RPG Awards (Apocalypse World for Game of the Year, Best Support, and Most Innovative Game); 2011 Lucca Comics & Games (Apocalypse World for Best Role-Playing Game); 2011 Golden Geek Awards (Apocalypse World for Best Role-Playing Game)

Meguey Baker (/mɛˈɡeɪ/) is a tabletop role-playing game designer, independent publisher and quilt historian. She and her husband Vincent Baker designed Apocalypse World, the first game in the Powered by the Apocalypse system.

== Career ==
=== Game design ===
Baker's most prominent work is Apocalypse World (2010). Apocalypse World is a post-apocalyptic game co-designed with her husband, Vincent Baker, published through Lumpley Games. Apocalypse World won multiple awards such as the 2010 Indie RPG Award for "Game of the Year" and the 2011 Lucca Comics & Games "Best Role-Playing Game" award. Powered by the Apocalypse, the game design framework created by the Bakers for Apocalypse World, has made a lasting impact on role-playing game design.

Baker is the founding owner of Night Sky Games. A Thousand and One Nights (2006), published through Night Sky Games, is a role-playing game based on the collection of Arabic stories The Book of One Thousand and One Nights. According to games scholar Evan Torner, A Thousand and One Nights includes systems for telling stories within stories, establishing and developing jealousies between characters, and reflecting upon metatextuality.

Baker has also designed other indie role-playing games such as Miss Schiffer's School for Young Ladies of Quality (2006), Psi*Run (2012) and Valiant Girls (2013); the latter were Night Sky Games' third and sixth publications respectively. She co-designed with her husband both Firebrands (2017), a romance TTRPG in a sci-fi setting focused on mobile frame pilots and Under Hollow Hills (2021), an RPG about fairytales and a traveling circus. Chase Carter for Polygon compared Firebrands to adventure romance television shows Bridgerton and Our Flag Means Death.

Baker and Emily Care Boss wrote Fair Game, a blog-style design and roleplaying theory journal, from 2005 to 2011.

=== Textiles and quilting ===
Baker is a quilter and quilt historian, particularly interested in how the history of non-dominant voices gets transmitted in objects and oral tradition rather than the official written history. Baker collects and restores antique and vintage textiles, as well as creates new works.

Baker is a Collections Assistant for the Hatfield Historical Museum and is part of the curatorial team for the Historical Society of Greenfield.

== Personal life ==
Baker studied American History at Hampshire College with a focus on early American textile history and material culture. Baker highlighted that her first quilt block was hand sewn at four years old; she wrote, "I checked with my mom. She says I was 4 because my sister was a newborn and sewing helped me keep quiet while she was napping. I'm guessing I did about one seam per nap". Baker and her husband Vincent Baker have three children.

In July 2023, Baker was diagnosed with breast cancer. CBR reported that a crowdfunding campaign on Meal Train to support Baker "was set with an initial goal of $2,500 and has since shattered that sum with a current total of over $22,800 [on August 26, 2023]. [...] In addition to financial contributions, many TTRPG Game Masters, players, and fans have taken the opportunity to voice their admiration for Baker and all that she has inspired".

== Bibliography ==
=== Role-playing games ===
- A Thousand and One Nights (2006)
- Miss Schiffer's School for Young Ladies of Quality (2006)
- The Girl Effect
- Apocalypse World (2010)
  - Apocalypse World 2nd Edition (2016)
  - Apocalypse World: the Extended Refbook (2019)
  - Apocalypse World: Burned Over Hackbook (2019)
- Psi-Run Revised (2012)
- Valiant Girls (2013)
- Firebrands (2017)
- The King Is Dead (2018)
- Run For Your Life (2019)
- At the Stroke of Midnight (2019)
- Haunted (2019)
- Does It Fit the Mission (2019)
- The Ghost of Eunice Williams (2019)
- A Branch of May (2019)
- Bless the Seeds (2019)
- In the Company of Birds (2019)
- Nine Pins (2019)
- The Sundered Land (2019)
- The Journey of Half-a-Fool (2019)
- In Dreaming Avalon (2019)
- Murderous Ghosts (2019)
- Space Station Home (2020)
- Unknown Country and Undiscovered Home (2020)
- The Lost Spells of Venus (2021)
- How the Story Ends (2021)
- Towns Like Ours (2021)
- Under Hollow Hills (2021)
- The Wizard's Grimoire (serialized: 2021–present)
- Daggerheart (2025)

=== Other ===
- Unframed: The Art of Improvisation for Game Masters (2014)
