= World Wide Wrestling RPG =

Tabletop role-playing game

- Designers: Nathan D. Paoletta
- Illustrators: Nathan D. Paoletta
- Publication: 2015; 11 years ago
- Genres: Tabletop role-playing game
- Systems: Powered by the Apocalypse

World Wide Wrestling RPG is a tabletop role-playing game about the lives of professional wrestlers both inside and outside the ring. It was written and illustrated by Nathan D. Paoletta. Gameplay focuses on the tension between wrestlers' characters as public entertainers versus their real personalities.

== Gameplay ==
The basic game mechanics are built upon the Powered by the Apocalypse framework.

Player characters must manage three main variables: their favor with the audience, their tension with other fighters, and their momentum. Developing character connections such as friendships and rivalries unlocks new abilities. Example abilities include recording a promotional video or using a new weapon.

== Publication history ==
The first edition was independently published in 2015. Paoletta released a second edition in 2020 after raising $55,886 on Kickstarter.

== Reception ==
Alex Meehan for Dicebreaker named it "one of the best tabletop roleplaying games released in 2015."

Jacob Creswell for Comic Book Resources praised the game's handling of cooperative storytelling during matches, writing that "WWWRPG understands that storytelling in wrestling can take on many different forms, so it gives players the tools to explore the style that they want, rather than limiting them."

William Quant for ComicsBeat.com wrote, "this game slaps. Obviously wrestling fans will get an absolute kick out of it, but even non-wrestling fans with imaginations will have a grand time in a combat and character driven world, especially since you’ve got to manage your character’s actions outside of the ring and off-screen, too."
