= Primetime Adventures =

Tabletop role-playing game

- First edition cover
- Designers: Matt Wilson
- Publishers: Dog Eared Designs
- Publication: 2004; 22 years ago
- Genres: Indie
- Systems: custom

Primetime Adventures is a role-playing game by Matt Wilson, independently published by Dog Eared Designs. The players create a television show together, establishing setting elements and potential main characters. One player takes on the role of the producer, while the rest of the players take on the role of the main characters, or protagonists. Each season of the show spans five or nine sessions, or episodes as they're called. For each episode the protagonists have a screen presence between 1 and 3, which says how influential the character is in that episode and how much resource they bring into conflicts.

The first edition of the game used dice to handle conflict resolution, but the second edition uses regular playing cards. A character draws as many cards as they have screen presence, with each red card counting as a success. The side with the most successes wins the conflict, and the highest individual card gets the final word on what the outcome is. This means that it can be either the winner or the loser of the conflict that narrates the result.

The game suggests that the group draw inspiration for story complexity and ensemble structure from series like Buffy the Vampire Slayer, Gilmore Girls or Firefly. But the genre, tone, and setting specifics for the series are only limited by the imagination and preferences from the group.

In 2014 a Kickstarter for a 3rd edition raised over US$30,000.

== Reviews ==
- Coleção Dragão Brasil
- Realms of Fantasy
