= Masks: A New Generation =

2017 tabletop role-playing game

- Designers: Brendan Conway
- Illustrators: Michael Lee Lunsford and Brooke Carnevale
- Publishers: Magpie Games
- Publication: 2017
- Genres: Tabletop role-playing game
- Systems: Powered by the Apocalypse

Masks: A New Generation is a tabletop role-playing game about teenage superheroes, designed by Brendan Conway and published by Magpie Games in 2017 after raising $107,328 on Kickstarter. It uses the Powered by the Apocalypse framework. Masks won an ENNIE Award and an Indie Game Developer Network award.

== Gameplay ==
Masks encourages coming-of-age stories about superheroes. Player characters are teens with special powers. Each player builds a character using one of ten playbooks, which are based on different personality characteristics rather than heroic powers.

In addition to typical Powered by the Apocalypse game mechanics such as moves, Masks includes a statistic called "influence" that measures characters' emotional power over each other.

The setting is a metropolis called Halcyon City.

== Expansions and Supplements ==
In addition to the core book Masks: A New Generation, Magpie Games has also published the expansion sourcebooks Secrets of A.E.G.I.S., Halcyon City Herald Collection, and Unbound, as well as two supplemental card decks, Deck of Influence and Deck of Villainy .

== Reception ==
Masks won the 2017 Silver ENNIE Award for "Best Family Game/Product" and the 2017 Indie Game Developer Network award for "Best Rules."

Emily St. James for Vox Media recommended Masks as, "One of my favorite PBTA games — and a great one for beginners." Maddie Cullen for Dicebreaker named Masks one of the six best superhero RPGs for Marvel and DC Comics fans. Keerthi Sridharan for Polygon named Masks "my personal favorite" Powered by the Apocalypse game.

Masks was one of the design inspirations for Visigoths vs. Mall Goths.
