= Wyrd Con Interactive Theater convention =

The Wyrd Con Interactive Theater Convention is a live action role-playing (LARP) convention. The conventions began with Wyrd One in 2010. Wyrd Con is the only convention of its kind on the west coast of the United States, and continues to be one of the largest gatherings of its kind. The first three Wyrd Cons have been held in Costa Mesa in Orange County, California. Groups related to Interactive Theater, LARP, or Battle Games may submit their event to Wyrd Con.

The first Wyrd Con, called Wyrd One, was the largest LARP convention held in North America as of 2010. Wyrd One was held at the Hilton in Costa Mesa, CA. Larry Niven was a guest speaker, along with other relevant speakers including Nick Baumann of League of STEAM.

Editor Amber Eagar produced Journeys to another world for Wyrd Con to accompany the 2010 LARP Summit held at Wyrd Con in 2010. Journeys is a book of compiled LARP articles selected to provide an academic view of live-action role-playing in North America.

- The second Wyrd Con, "Two Wyrd", was held June 10–12, 2011 and featured more speakers focusing on Alternate Reality Games, or ARGs, and Transmedia.
- A third convention, "Tri Wyrd" took place on June 21–24, 2012.
- Wyrd Con 4 took place on September 12–15, 2013.
- Wyrd Con 5 took place on May 22–26, 2014.
- Wyrd Con 6 took place on September 24–27, 2015.

Wyrd Con says they have two goals:

1. to increase exposure to Interactive Theater by providing entertaining events
2. to increase exposure to the variety of Interactive Theater by providing educational experiences.
