= Dust Devils (game) =

2002 role-playing game

- Cover
- Designers: Matt Snyder
- Publishers: Chimera Creative
- Publication: 2002, revised 2007
- Genres: Western, Indie
- Systems: Custom

Dust Devils is an independently published role-playing game set in the Old West, written by Matt Snyder. It was voted the 2002 Indie RPG of the Year; it also won the Best Synergy of Game and Rules category, as well as placing in the Best Production and Most Innovative Game categories.

The game uses playing cards and Poker mechanics to resolve scenes and situations. Players create poker hands using their character's scores to earn cards. Then, they compare poker hands to see how their characters perform in a scene. The game was the first RPG to introduce a randomized narrator. In the game, whoever plays the highest single card during a scene becomes the narrator for how the scene ends and what happens in it.

== New edition ==
Matt Snyder republished Dust Devils in expanded form in 2007. The new edition, called Dust Devils Revenged, includes updated rules, play advice, and a brief examination of the Old West in film and history. The new edition also included three different settings for the game.

- Deathwish re-envisioned the game for modern spy action
- Ronin, by Jason Blair, altered the game rules for Feudal Japan
- Concrete Angels, by Jared Sorensen, altered the game for Neo noir crime
