= Apocalypse World =

Tabletop role-playing game by Vincent and Meguey Baker

- First edition cover
- Designers: D. Vincent Baker; Meguey Baker
- Publishers: Lumpley Games
- Publication: 2010; 16 years ago
- Genres: Post-apocalyptic science fiction
- Systems: Powered by the Apocalypse

Apocalypse World is a post-apocalyptic indie role-playing game by D. Vincent Baker and Meguey Baker, published in 2010 with only an implied setting that is fleshed out by the players in the course of character creation. It was the game for which the Powered by the Apocalypse engine was developed. On release, Apocalypse World won the 2010 Indie RPG Award and 2011 Golden Geek RPG of the year.

A second edition was Kickstarted in 2016. This edition updated some of the mechanics (HX, battle-moves, threat map, etc.), playbooks (including replacing the Operator with Maestro-D and Quarantine), and brought Meguey Baker on board as co-designer, but retained most of the original's design. A redesign, Apocalypse World: Burned Over, has been in development since 2021. Burned Over is a hackbook rather than a stand-alone edition, being a partial document that requires and builds upon the 2nd Edition.

== Setting ==
The game's implied post-apocalyptic setting is fleshed out during character creation. Each playbook involves and provides inspiration for certain details of the setting, such as the Hardholder, who rules the local settlement and therefore has control over its size, population, and appearance. The characters' shared history is also determined in the course of character generation. Themes of the game are survival and relationships, and they come out in the "pure lethality of the game". Notably, the Master of Ceremonies (MC) is not supposed to do any planning before sitting down to the first session, so that all players have an opportunity to shape the game world collectively.

== Gameplay ==
=== Materials ===
- One MC (Gamemaster)
- Three to five players
- Two six-sided dice each
- A different playbook for each player
- Quick reference sheets for "moves" and the MC's "fronts"

=== Game mechanics ===
The system uses the Powered by the Apocalypse engine. It features dice-rolling checks for challenging situations of 2d6 plus a relevant stat. Results of 10+ are successes, while 7 to 9 are partial successes or hard choices, and results of 6 or less allow the MC to make a move. A notable feature of Apocalypse World is the inclusion of a "special move" for each class, which triggers when a character of that class meets the appropriate triggers.

Examples of playbooks include the Hardholder, the Gunlugger, the Battlebabe, the Driver, the Chopper (Gang Leader), the Hocus (Cult Leader), the Brainer (Psychic), the Savvyhead (Mechanic/Inventor), and the Skinner (artist). Stats used in rolls are: Cool (Calmness, Rationality); Hard (Strength, Intimidation); Hot (Attraction, Charisma); Sharp (Empathy, Intelligence); and Weird (Psychic, Luck). Characters also carry History (Hx) stats, referencing their non-symmetric relationships with other players; the stat adjusts and grants XP as the characters understand each other more or less.

== Reception ==
Reception was positive, with Apocalypse World winning numerous awards. There was praise for the streamlined nature of the game, as well as the MC job, although the inclusion of a sex move was controversial and was explicitly called out as not for children by SFSignal.

Academic PS Berge wrote, "Vincent and Meguey Baker's Apocalypse World (AW, 2010) marked the beginning of a critical era in 'fiction-first' TRPG design. [...] A violent, dystopian, wasteland-punk game, AW itself is less important to the legacy of independent TRPGs than the Bakers' invitation to other designers: 'If you've created a game inspired by Apocalypse World, and would like to publish it, please do'".

James Hanna, writing for CBR in 2020, commented that "ten years on, Powered by the Apocalypse games (PbtA) are everywhere. The Bakers designed the PbtA engine so that other game designers could 'hack' it, creating games with similar mechanics, but unique worlds and rules. More than four dozen games bear the PbtA license, making Apocalypse World incredibly influential. That influence continues to be felt as games move into new territories and find new audiences".

Chase Carter for Polygon listed it as one of the "seminal" games during the "blooming of indie RPG designers" in the latter part of the 2000s, along with Fiasco, Lady Blackbird, Dogs in the Vineyard and the Romance Trilogy.

In his 2023 book Monsters, Aliens, and Holes in the Ground, RPG historian Stu Horvath noted, "All of [the game's] mechanics pale in comparison to Apocalypse World's major innovation: The way it handles actions .. This bundling [of different actions] is what Apocalypse World does to RPGs with the introduction of the Moves mechanic, and it marks an important milestone for RPG design." Horvath also pointed out the many RPG hacks that had been created using the game mechanics of Apocalypse World, collectively known as Powered by the Apocalypse (PbtA). "PbtA excels at facilitating these sorts of tightly constrained, emotionally charged games that ultimately focus on the mess of interconnected relationships."

== Awards ==
- 2010 Indie RPG Awards – Game of the Year – Winner
- 2010 Indie RPG Awards – Best Support – Winner
- 2010 Indie RPG Awards – Most Innovative Game – Winner
- 2011 Golden Geek Awards – RPG of the Year – Winner
- 2011 Lucca Comics & Games – Best Role-Playing Game – Winner
- 2025 American Library Association's Games & Gaming Round Table – Platinum Play Classics – Winner

== See also ==
- Monsterhearts
- Dungeon World
- Dogs in the Vineyard
