= Magpie Games =

Tabletop role-playing games publisher

Magpie Games is an American tabletop role-playing games publishing company. Their 2021 crowdfunding campaign to fund the publication of Avatar Legends: The Roleplaying Game raised over five million dollars, breaking the record for Kickstarter's highest earning tabletop role-playing game. Other notable publications include Bluebeard's Bride and a role-playing game adaptation of the board game Root. The publisher has won IndieCade, ENNIE Awards, and Indie Game Developer Network awards.

In 2024, Magpie Games offered a discounted collection of their games on Humble Bundle as a charitable fundraiser for Child's Play.

== Awards ==
Magpie Games won a 2018 IndieCade award for Bluebeard's Bride.

Magpie Games has won the following ENNIE Awards:

- 2023: Best Rules (Gold) and Best Family Game/Product (Gold) for Avatar Legends; Best Free Game / Product (Gold) for Root: The RPG Talon Hill Quickstart.
- 2022: Best Game (Silver) and Best Supplement (Silver) for Root: The RPG
- 2020: Best Rules (Silver) for Zombie World
- 2017: Best Family Game (Silver) for Masks: A New Generation
- 2016: Best Rules (Silver) for Urban Shadows

Magpie Games has won the following Indie Game Developer Network awards:

awards:

- 2019: Game of the Year and Best Art for Bluebeard's Bride: Book of Rooms
- 2018: Best Art for Bluebeard's Bride
- 2017: Best Rules for Masks: A New Generation
