= Vincent Baker =

Role-playing game designer

- Born: United States
- Occupations: Writer, game designer
- Spouse: Meguey Baker
- Writing career
- Genre: Role-playing games

David Vincent Baker is a designer and theorist of tabletop role-playing games and the owner of indie role-playing games publisher Lumpley Games, which also hosts the archives of The Forge. He and his wife Meguey Baker designed Apocalypse World, the first game in the Powered by the Apocalypse system. Apocalypse World won Game of the Year, Best Support, and Most Innovative game at the 2010 Indie RPG Awards, and was 2011 RPG of the Year at both the Golden Geek Awards and Lucca Comics & Games. Baker also designed Dogs in the Vineyard, which won the 2004 Indie RPG Game of the Year and Innovation Award and was one of three games shortlisted for the 2004 Diana Jones Award.

== Games ==
Vincent Baker is the designer of the indie role-playing game Dogs in the Vineyard (2004), one of the first indie RPGs to be both financially and sociologically successful. This game is about God's Watchdogs who protect the faithful from the dangers of the 19th century American frontier, and the game established the concept of "say yes or roll" as a game mechanic.

Apocalypse World is a post-apocalyptic game co-designed with his wife, Meguey Baker, published through Lumpley Games. Apocalypse World won multiple awards such as the 2010 Indie RPG Award for "Game of the Year" and the 2011 Lucca Comics & Games "Best Role-Playing Game" award. Powered by the Apocalypse, the game design framework created by the Bakers for Apocalypse World, has made a lasting impact on role-playing game design.

He also co-designed with his wife both Firebrands (2017), a romance TTRPG in a sci-fi setting focused on mobile frame pilots, and Under Hollow Hills (2021), an RPG about fairytales and a traveling circus.

== Theory of Games ==
Baker and Emily Care Boss formulated the Lumpley Principle (a.k.a. Baker-Care Principle) which states "System (including but not limited to 'the rules') is defined as the means by which the group agrees to imagined events during play." Further development of the Lumpley Principle described player contributions as being assigned credibility by the other players in the game. Emily Care Boss discussed Baker's mechanical contributions to role-playing games in her chapter "Key Concepts in Forge Theory" in Playground Worlds: Creating and Evaluating Experiences of Role-Playing Games. C. Thi Nguyen further discussed Baker's contributions to improvisational systems in the chapter "Creativity and Improvisation in Games" in The Routledge Handbook of Philosophy and Improvisation in the Arts.

== Bibliography ==
=== Role-playing games ===
- kill puppies for satan (2001)
  - cockroach souffle (2002)
- The Cheap and Cheesy Fantasy Game (2001)
- Matchmaker (2001)
- Dogs in the Vineyard (2004)
- The Abductinators (2003)
- Mechaton (2006)
  - Mobile Frame Zero: Rapid Attack (2012)
- Poison'd (2007)
- In a Wicked Age (2007)
- Apocalypse World (2010)
  - Apocalypse World 2nd Edition (2016)
  - Apocalypse World: the Extended Refbook (2019)
  - Apocalypse World: Burned Over Hackbook (2019)
- The Sundered Land (2013)
- The Seclusium of Orphone of the Three Visions (2013), a supplement for Lamentations of the Flame Princess
- Firebrands (2017)
- Murderous Ghosts (2017)
- The King Is Dead (2018)
- In Dreaming Avalon (2019)
- Murderous Ghosts (2019)
- The Journey of Half-a-Fool (2019)
- The Sundered Land (2019)
- At the Stroke of Midnight (2019)
- Run For Your Life (2019)
- How the Story Ends (2021)
- Under Hollow Hills (2021)
- The Wizard's Grimoire (serialized: 2021-present)
