= Lucca Comics & Games =

Italian annual comic book and gaming convention

Coordinates: 43.8°N 10.5°E

Lucca Comics & Games Salone Internazionale dei Fumetti
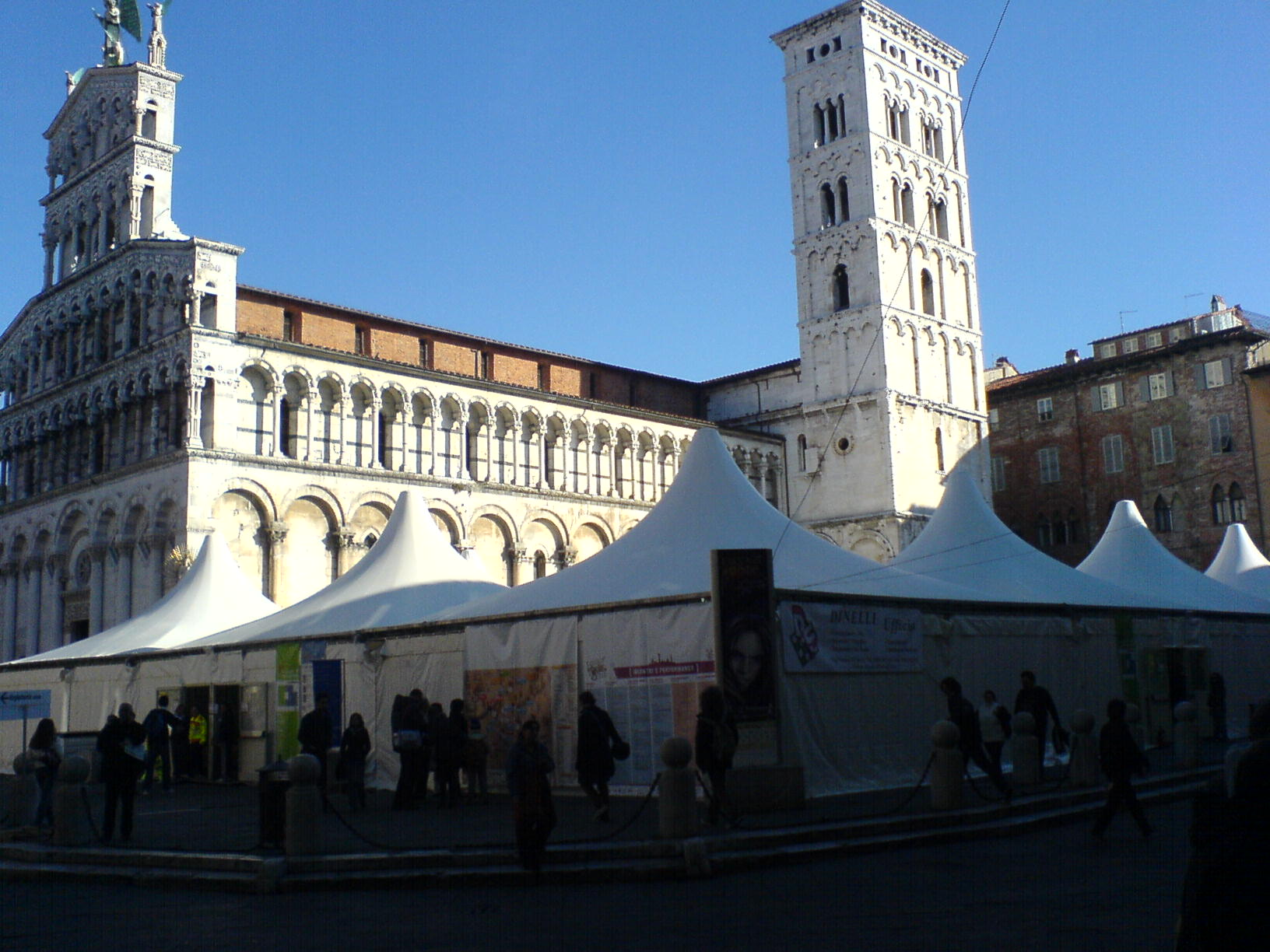
- A Lucca Comics pavilion, near the San Michele in Foro basilica, in 2007
- Status: Active
- Genre: Comics, animation, and video games
- Locations: Lucca, Tuscany
- Country: Italy
- Inaugurated: 1965; 61 years ago
- Founders: Rinaldo Traini; Romano Calisi; Claude Moliterni
- Attendance: 319,926 in 2022
- Organizer: Comune of Lucca, through the limited company Lucca Crea S.r.l., in which flew the previous Lucca Comics & Games and Lucca Polo Fiere e Congressi
- Website: www.luccacomicsandgames.com

Lucca Comics & Games is an annual comic book and gaming convention in Lucca, Italy, traditionally held at the end of October, in conjunction with All Saints' Day. It is the largest comics festival in Europe, and the second biggest in the world after the Comiket in Tokyo, Japan.

== History ==
=== Salone Internazionale dei Comics ===
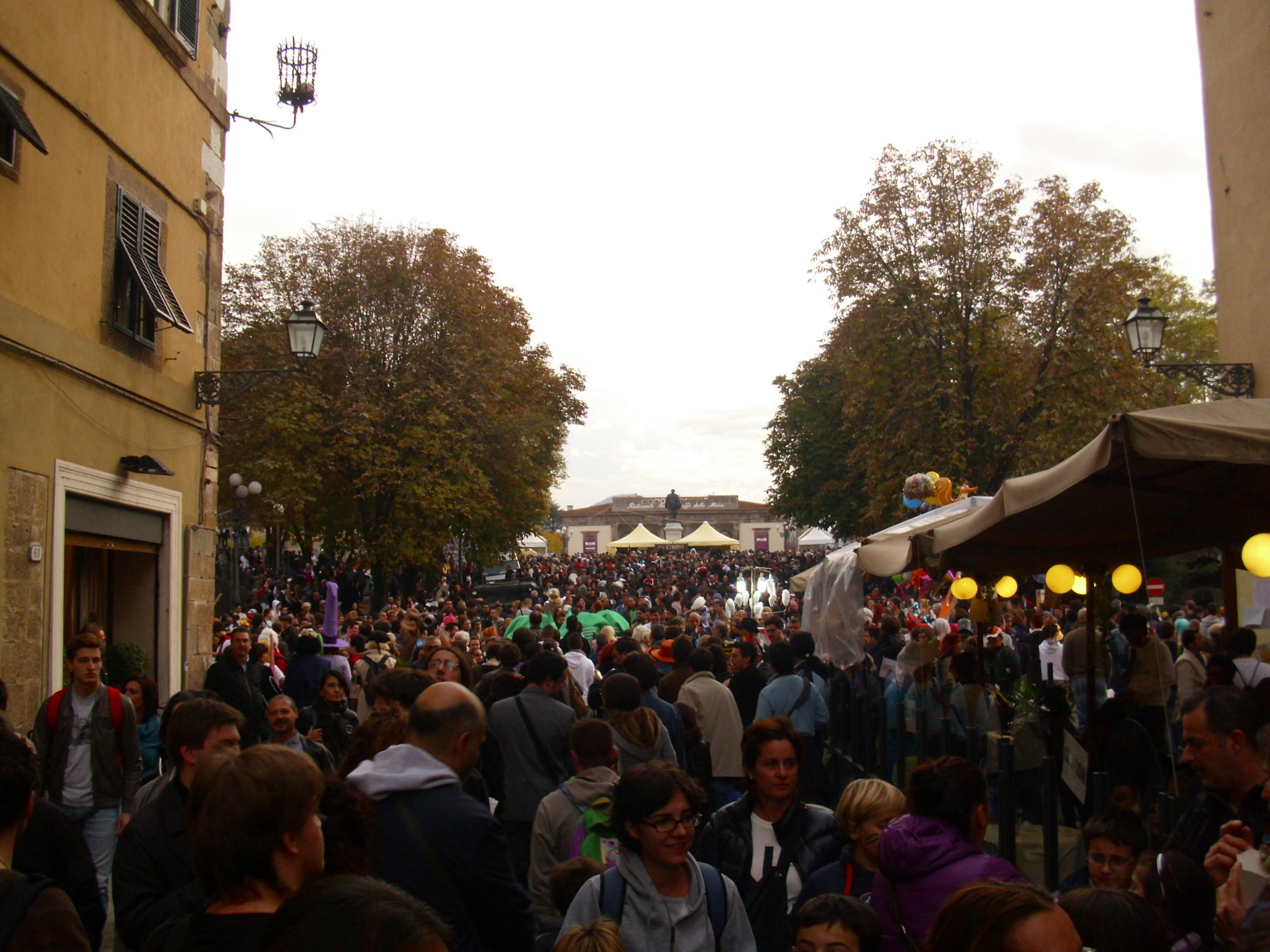
Crowd in Vittorio Veneto street during Lucca Comics & Games 2012

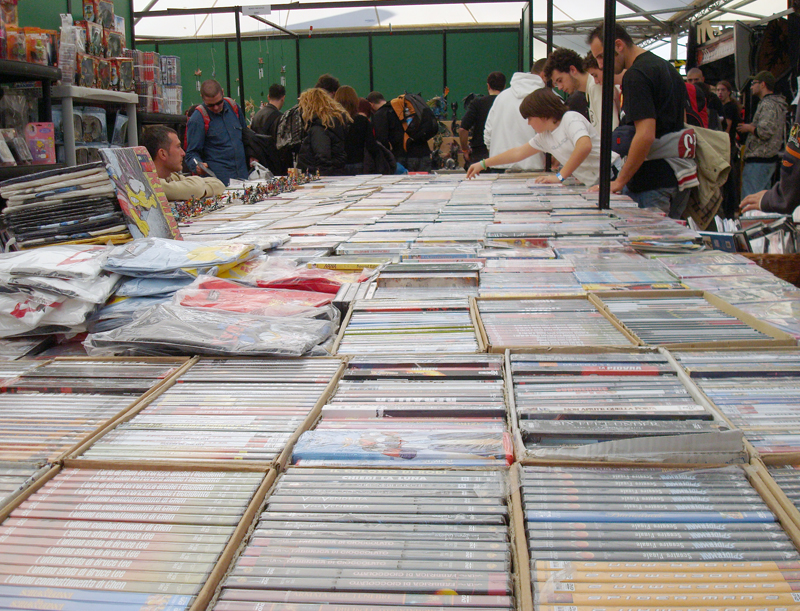
Inside of a pavilion

The Salone Internazionale dei Fumetti ("International Congress of Comics") was launched by a Franco-Italian partnership, consisting of Italians Rinaldo Traini and Romano Calisi and Frenchman Claude Moliterni (forming the International Congress of Cartoonists and Animators), and was first held 21–22 February 1965 in Bordighera, Imperia.

On September 24–25, 1966, the Salone was held in Lucca for the first time, in the Piazza Napoleone in the center of town; it grew in size and importance over the years.

The 1968 edition, held November 16–17, also saw the birth of Immagine, the Center for Iconographic Studies, a private cultural organization sponsored by the University of Rome that became responsible for producing the festival. Beginning in 1969, Traini became festival director, holding onto that position through the last Lucca salon, held in 1992.

"Lucca 8", held October 29 – November 4, 1972, saw the festival expand to seven days, with the first three days dedicated to animation and the final three to comics. "Lucca 12", held October 30 – November 4, 1976, witnessed the participation of 32 countries and 15 international delegations, including UNESCO, UNICEF, the International Council of Design, and the International Animated Film Association.

Funding issues reduced the frequency of the festival to every two years, beginning in 1977. From 1982 the festival was moved to the Palazzo dello Sport, a sports center outside the city walls, where it remained until 1992. The period between the 17th (October 26 – November 2, 1986) and 18th editions (October 28 – November 4, 1990) was marked by a financial and political crisis that nearly ended the Salon. A power struggle between Immagine and the Municipality of Lucca culminated in a temporary suspension of the event — no salon was held in 1988. Ultimately, a formal structure was created for shared governance and continuity of the festival. Despite tensions over commercialization (especially making the festival a ticketed event for the first time), "Lucca '90" successfully relaunched the event, blending prestige and public appeal.

The 19th edition of the festival, held October 25 to November 1, 1992, was the final Salone Internazionale del Comics held in Lucca.

=== Birth of Lucca Comics ===
In 1993, after the Salone Internazionale dei Comics left Lucca, city leaders launched a new convention called simply Lucca Comics that was a reprise of the old one. In 1995, it changed its name to Lucca Comics & Games. The festival attracted 50,000 attendees in 2002.

Meanwhile, Salone Internazionale dei Comics co-founder Rinaldo Traini continued the festival in Rome as part of his new venture Expocartoon, held from 1995 to 2005.

=== Merger ===
In 2006, for the festival's 40th anniversary, the Salone merged with Lucca Comics & Games and moved back to Lucca's city center, with numerous tents and pavilions arranged in different squares within and outside the walls of the medieval city.

In 2022 the festival sold 319,926 tickets, beating the record established in 2016, when it had attracted 270,000 attendees.

The 2023 edition, held November 1–5, which featured posters by Israeli artists Tomer Hanuka and Asaf Hanuka, was riven by debate surrounding Hamas' October 7 attacks and the resulting Gaza war. Many creators cancelled their scheduled appearances at the show; despite this, 314,220 tickets were sold.

The 2024 edition fair's poster was designed by Japanese artist Yoshitaka Amano, the illustrator of the Final Fantasy series. The three event posters created by Amano were inspired by the works of Giacomo Puccini (the centenary of whose death was in 2024):

- The first poster, Ouverture, was inspired by Puccini's opera Tosca
- The second poster, Crescendo, was inspired by Madama Butterfly
- The third final poster, Finale Fantastico, was an unpublished work by Amano that was created during the event

== Awards ==
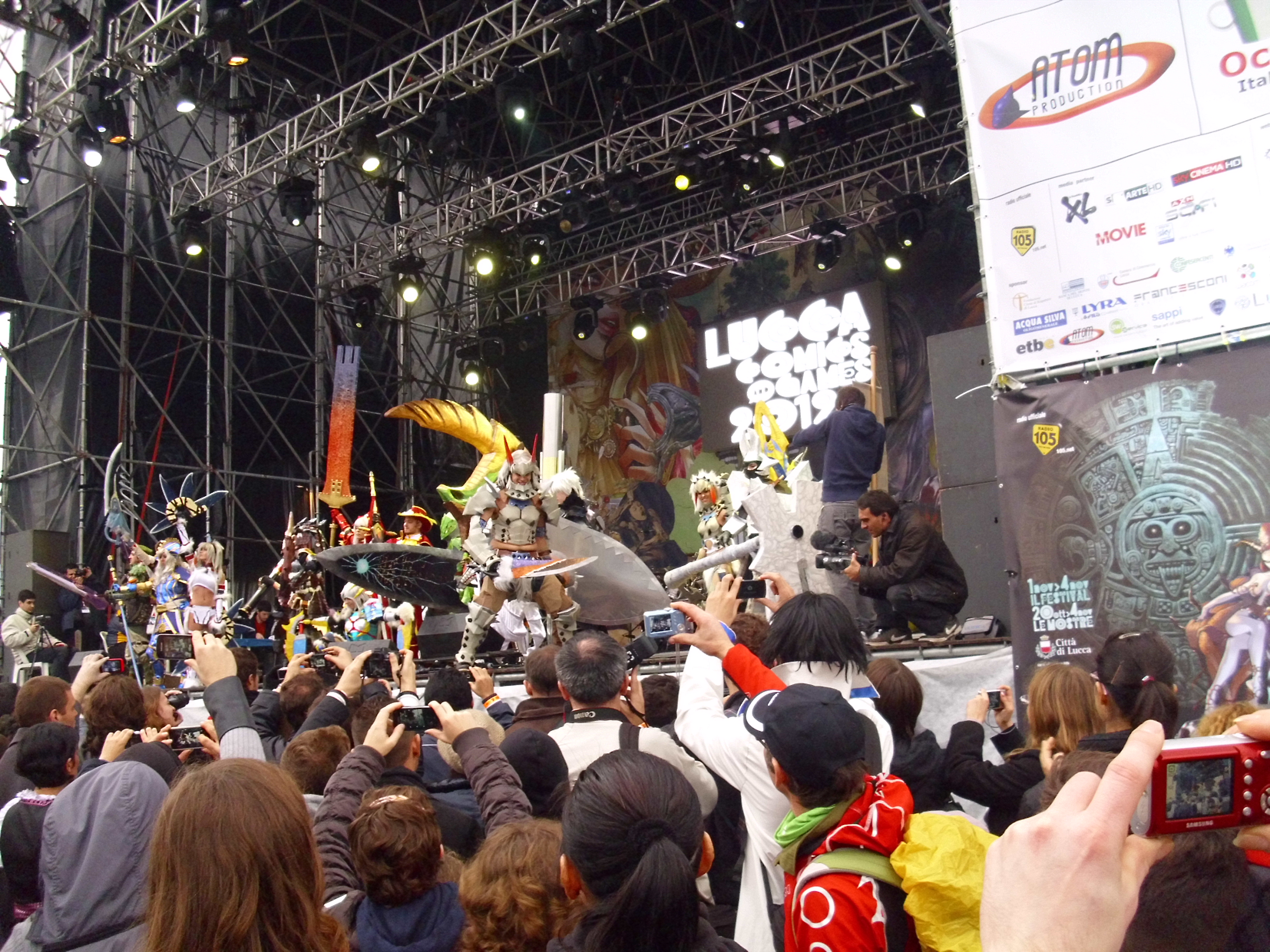
The stage of cosplay

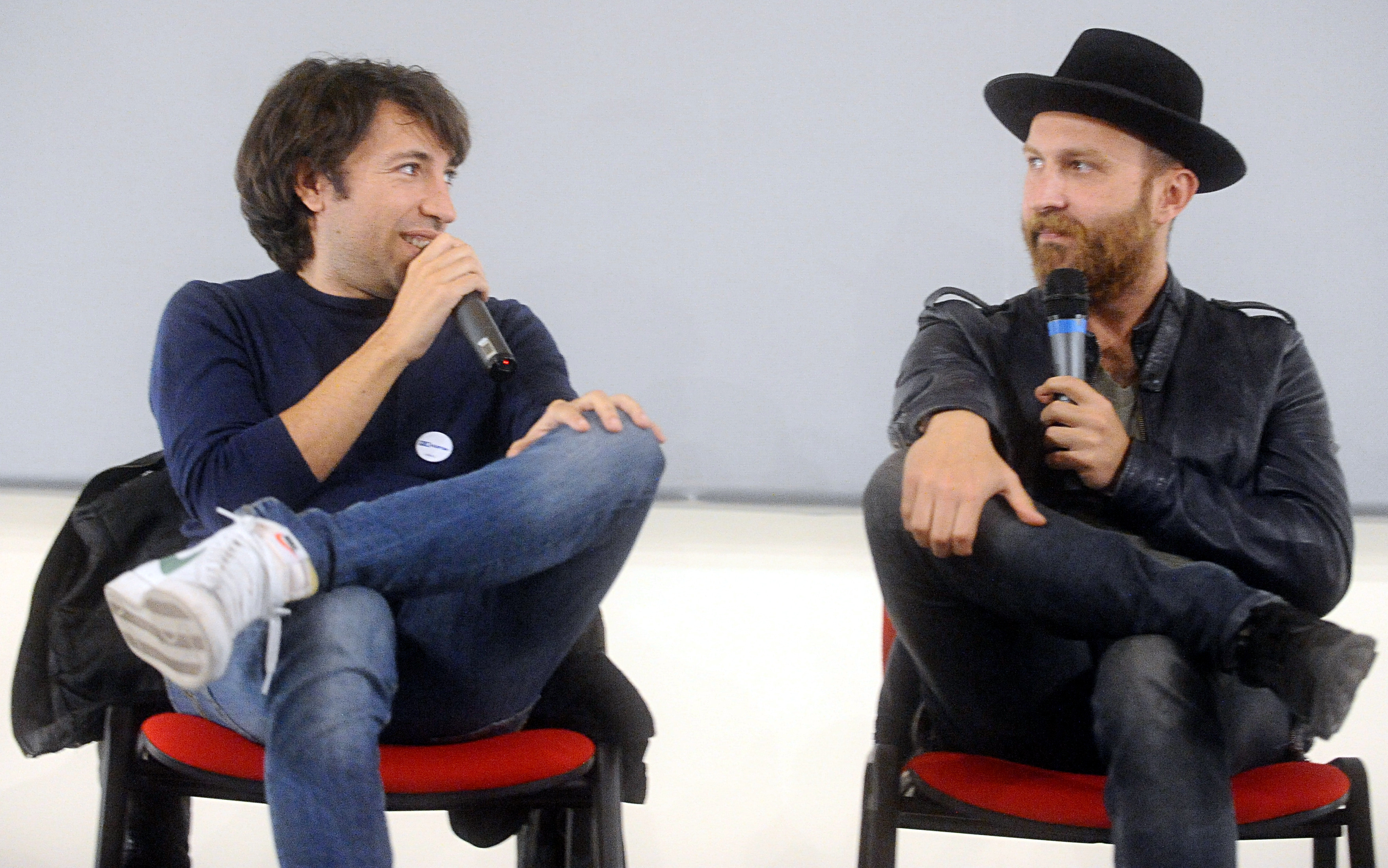
The italian actors Herbert Ballerina and Maccio Capatonda at Lucca Comics & Games 2016

=== Comics awards ===
From 1970 to 1992, the festival presented the Yellow Kid Award — named in honor of Richard F. Outcault's seminal comic strip character The Yellow Kid — in such categories as Best Cartoonist, Best Illustrator, Best Newcomer, Best Foreign Artist, and Lifetime Achievement. Yellow Kid Awards were also presented to publishers, both domestic and foreign. Before taking on the name "Yellow Kid", the Lucca prize was known as the "Gran Guinigis" (named after Lucca's Guinigi Tower).

The Yellow Kid Awards were presented at the Salone Internazionale dei Comics (International Comics and Cartooning Exhibition) in Rome from 1994 to 2005, at which point the Yellow Kid Awards were retired.

In 2006, Lucca Comics & Games brought back the Gran Guinigi as a career accomplishment award.

In 2020, as the festival redubbed itself "Lucca Changes" amidst a shift to virtual programming during the COVID-19 pandemic, the awards shifted to a new system under the umbrella term Lucca Comics Awards, consisting of nine categories (three Yellow Kids, five Gran Guinigis, and one Stefano Beani Award named for a former festival director), "regardless of nationality, editorial format or distribution method".

In 2024, a special mention was awarded in an emotional moment to Mahasen Al-Khateeb, Palestinian illustrator and character designer killed in an Israeli bombardment in her home town of Gaza.

==== Gran Guinigi recipients ====
From 2006.

- 2006: Gino D'Antonio
- 2007: Sergio Toppi
- 2008: Vittorio Giardino
- 2009: Robert Crumb
- 2010: Jiro Taniguchi
- 2011: Enrique Breccia
- 2012: Hermann Huppen
- 2013: Silver (Guido Silvestri)
- 2014: Gipi
- 2015: Alfredo Castelli
- 2016: Albert Uderzo
- 2017: José Muñoz
- 2018: Leiji Matsumoto
- 2019: Chris Claremont
- 2020: AkaB (Gabriele Di Benedetto)
- 2021: Lorenzo Mattotti
- 2022: Riyoko Ikeda and Milo Manara
- 2023: Frank Miller
- 2024: Tradd Moore

=== Games awards ===
- 1999: Murat CELEBI's [skirmish miniature game [CONFRONTATION], for Best of Show.
- 2002: Emiliano Sciarra's Wild West-themed card game Bang!, for Best of Show
- 2003: Sine Requie, for Best Italian Game
- 2004: Helena Bulaja's Priče iz davnine ("Croatian Tales of Long Ago"), for Best Multimedia Award
- 2010:
  - 7 Wonders, for Best Card Game
  - Eden: the Deceit, Side Award for Best Game Mechanics
- 2011:
  - Vincent Baker's Apocalypse World, for RPG of the Year
  - Twilight Struggle, for Best of Show in Boardgame for Experts
