= Indie role-playing game =

Aspect of role-playing game publishing

An indie role-playing game is a role-playing game published by individuals or small press publishers, in contrast to games published by large corporations. Indie tabletop role-playing game designers participate in various game distribution networks, development communities, and gaming conventions, both in person and online. Indie game designer committees grant annual awards for excellence.

In the early 2000s, indie role-playing discussion forums such as The Forge developed innovative design patterns and theories. In 2010, the game Apocalypse World established the popular design framework Powered by the Apocalypse, inspiring hundreds of similar games. Starting in the early 2010s, indie game publishing provided new opportunities for LGBTQ writers to share underrepresented stories.

Common examples of indie role-playing games include Apocalypse World and the Powered by the Apocalypse framework, The Quiet Year, Fiasco, Fall of Magic, Blades in the Dark, and Dialect.

== Definition of term ==
Although there is no consensus on the exact definition of an "indie role-playing game," users of the term typically emphasize creative freedom and fair financial compensation for game designers. For example, an organizer of the 2022 Queer Games Bundle on Itch.io told Chase Carter for Dicebreaker:

“Our goal is a future in which there are no more starving indie developers. Where corporations don’t rule our brains pumping out endless sequels but instead we have a vibrant games community that produces countless works...To get there we need developers to gain experience and make many games, and that can only happen with time and a livable income.”

Some definitions of "indie role-playing game" require that all commercial, design, or conceptual elements of the game stay under the control of the creator(s), while others only specify that the game should be produced outside a corporate environment. All definitions agree that an indie role-playing game can be self-published. Some definitions additionally include small press games, because small press publishing frequently involves creator ownership and/or higher degrees of creative control for writers.

== Awards ==
Multiple annual awards are given to indie games for excellence in multiple categories of design. The Indie Game Developer Network grants the Indie Groundbreaker Award in the categories of Most Innovative, Best Rules, Best Setting, Best Art, and Game of the Year. IndieCade offers awards for indie role-playing games in addition to video games. The ENNIE Awards and Diana Jones Award frequently honor indie role-playing games, though both awards are also awarded to games published by corporations. The Golden Cobra Challenge grants the Golden Cobra Award for freeform live action role-playing games, including indie tabletop role-playing games with freeform-like design elements.

Several previous award committees for indie role-playing games are no longer operational. The Indie RPG Awards were presented to indie games from 2002 to 2018, with the main category of Indie RPG of the Year and sub-categories Best RPG Supplement, Best Free Game, Best Production, Most Innovative Game, and Best Support. Dicebreaker launched the Tabletop Awards in 2022 and awarded it yearly until the website was shuttered in 2024 following the sale of the Gamer Network to IGN. The 200 Word RPG Challenge granted awards from 2015 to 2019.

== Publication methods ==
Since independent role-playing game publishers lack the financial backing of large companies, they often use different forms of publishing than the traditional three-tier model of publisher, distributor and retailer.

=== Business models ===
Crowdfunding is a common model of promotion, funding, and distribution for indie role-playing games. Both individuals and small-press publishers frequently use Kickstarter and BackerKit for this purpose.

Some publishers have no interest in financial success; others define it differently than most mainstream companies by emphasizing artistic fulfillment as a primary goal. Some independent publishers offer free downloads of games in digital form, while others charge a fee for digital download.

=== Distribution ===
Indie distribution is often achieved directly by the game's creator via e-commerce on Itch.io, DriveThruRPG, Kickstarter, BackerKit, or via in-person sales at gaming conventions. However, some fulfillment houses and small-scale distributors do handle indie products using the traditional three tier system of publisher, distributor and retailer.

Starting in 2018, itch.io became a significant digital distributor of indie role-playing games, primarily in PDF form.

Several organizations specialize in sales of indie games using a two-tier system of publisher and retail outlet. Indie Press Revolution distributes games that it labels as independent.

=== Formats ===
Independent publishers may offer games only in digital format, only in print, or they may offer the same game in a variety of formats. Common digital formats include PDF and EPUB. Desktop publishing technologies have allowed indie designers to publish their games as bound books. The advent of print on demand (POD) publishing lowered production costs.

== Current indie design communities ==
=== itch.io ===
Indie game designers use itch.io to host game jams as inspiration for the development of new games using specific themes or game mechanics. Indie designers also sell games from multiple authors together as "bundles." Large indie roleplaying game bundles sometimes support political or charitable causes, such as Black Lives Matter, trans rights advocacy, abortion access funds, or material support for victims of war.

=== Conventions ===
Local gaming conventions provide dedicated space for playing, playtesting, and/or selling indie role-playing games. These include PAX Unplugged in Philadelphia, Breakout Con in Toronto, Big Bad Con in San Francisco, the Double Exposure conventions in Morristown, New Jersey, and BostonFIG.

=== Open Hearth and the Gauntlet ===
The Open Hearth Gaming Community focuses specifically on indie role-playing games and regularly schedules online play sessions through videoconferencing. In 2023, Open Hearth was founded to continue the online indie gaming calendar of the Gauntlet community after The Gauntlet (tabletop games producer) narrowed its focus to its indie game publishing and podcasting activities. Between 2018 and 2023, the Gauntlet also maintained a lively discussion forum about indie and OSR role-playing games.

== LGBTQ games ==
Starting in the 2010s, indie role-playing games became a haven for LGBTQ storytelling, due to creators' ability to release non-mainstream content without seeking approval from mainstream publishing companies. Avery Alder's game Monsterhearts was one of the first published Powered by the Apocalypse games and an early example of a specifically queer-themed tabletop role-playing game, followed in 2014 by her first edition of Dream Askew, which focused on queer community-building and became the prototype for the Belonging Outside Belonging system. This laid the groundwork for Jay Dragon's 2019 Belonging Outside Belonging game Sleepaway, which included a custom gender creation system. In 2020, Lucian Kahn's game Visigoths vs. Mall Goths highlighted the bisexual community. The next year, April Kit Walsh's Thirsty Sword Lesbians, a Powered by the Apocalypse descendant, became the first tabletop game (indie or corporate) to win a Nebula Award. In 2022, Women are Werewolves by Yeonsoo Julian Kim and C.A.S. Taylor provided a framework for telling nonbinary stories.

As of September 2024, Itch.io lists 573 physical games (as opposed to video games) with the "LGBT" tag.

== History ==
=== The Forge (1999–2012) ===
The Forge, an internet forum overseen by Ron Edwards, provided the center of a self-identified indie RPG community in the early 2000s. This community generally defined indie games by the creators maintaining control of their work and avoiding traditional publishing. Tightly focused designs were a hallmark of this community. The Forge was strongly influenced by Ron Edwards' essay "System Does Matter" and GNS theory, which classified all participants in tabletop role-playing games under one of three personality types: gamist, narrativist, or simulationist. Indie RPGs inspired by the Forge often deliberately aligned with a narrativist approach to game design, focusing on strong characters confronting difficult moral choices.

The Forge was started in 1999 by Ed Healy as an information site, with Ron Edwards serving as the editorial lead. In 2001, Ron and Clinton R. Nixon recast the site, centered on the community forum that existed until 2012.

Games of note from the Forge community include, in roughly chronological order:

- Sorcerer: An Intense Role-playing Game (2001) by Ron Edwards
- The Burning Wheel (2002) by Luke Crane
- Donjon (2002) by Clinton R. Nixon
- Dust Devils (2002) by Matt Snyder
- My Life with Master (2003) by Paul Czege
- Dogs in the Vineyard (2004) by Vincent Baker
- Primetime Adventures (2004) by Matt Wilson
- Breaking the Ice (2005) by Emily Care Boss
- Shock: Social Science Fiction (2006) by Joshua A.C. Newman

William J. White, a professor at Penn State Altoona, highlighted that the Forge went through several eras. During the Spring era (2001–2004), the Forge experienced massive growth:

by the end of 2004, there were eight general forums comprising 7,977 threads encompassing 94,733 individual posts—an expansion of almost 400% in thread volume since April 2001. The most active was the RPG Theory forum, with 28,322 posts in 1,639 threads, a thread density of 17.3 posts per thread. The next most active was the Indie Game Design thread, with 23,318 total posts and a thread density of 11.0.

However, a decline in the quality of posts and other moderation actions led many people to leave the Forge for other online communities and this collective group became known as the "Forge diaspora". In 2005, Edwards closed the "two theoretical discussion forums [...] on the premise that the Big Model was fundamentally complete".

White states that the Autumn era (2007-2010) was impacted by disagreements between Edwards and others who ran the community, such as Nixon who at the time was the Forge's technical expert. In May 2010, there was a "major server crash" and the recovery split the site into a read-only archive (2001 to mid-2010) and active forums (" beginning with January 2008").

The Winter era (2011–2012) featured a much "pared-down forum structure" and the five remaining forums had "relatively low thread densities for all but the Actual Play forum". In 2012, Edwards announced the forthcoming closure of the community. White commented that the Forge:

"served to champion creator-owned 'indie RPGs' and game design innovation. After an initial surge of conceptual discussion and design experimentation on the forum itself from 2000 to 2004, [...] it inspired a panoply of blogs and forums where further discussion took place."

=== Historical storytelling games ===
Starting in the mid-00s, storytelling games based upon historical events began to emerge. Examples include Grey Ranks (2007) by Jason Morningstar, which takes place during the 1944 Warsaw Uprising, and Montsegur 1244 (2008) by Frederik Jensen, in which players tell a collaborative story about the Cathars.

=== Powered by the Apocalypse ===
Powered by the Apocalypse (PbtA) is a narrative-focused game design framework developed by Meguey Baker and Vincent Baker for the 2010 game Apocalypse World. The Bakers offered PbtA to the indie RPG design community as a starting point for new games with different settings and modified game mechanics. Early PbtA games included Dungeon World, Monsterhearts, and Monster of the Week. As of October 2024, Itch.io listed 1,172 products labelled "PbtA."

=== Story Games forum (2012-2019) ===
Story Games was an online discussion forum dedicated to indie role-playing games that focus on shared story creation. The forum operated from 2012 to 2019. Creators used it to discuss design issues, report progress, and promote their games. The forum ceased operation on August 15, 2019. Two sites that emerged to support the Story Games community were The Gauntlet Forums and Fictioneers.

=== Twitter and Google+ (2012-2023) ===
Twitter was a main center of indie RPG design discussion, artistic collaboration, and audience outreach from the mid-2010s until 2023. After the Forge forums closed in 2012, many members of that community continued discussing role-playing game theory on Google+ until that site also closed in 2019, after which they also moved their discussions to Twitter. After Elon Musk's purchase and rebrand of Twitter as X in 2023, many indie game writers and artists left the social network or struggled to continue using it for outreach with a reduced user base.

=== Predecessors to Wolves of Freeport ===
Several different digital publishing marketplaces that were later merged into Wolves of Freeport sold indie role-playing games between the 2000s and early 2020s. RPGNow and DriveThruRPG were two companies that sold indie role-playing games (as well as mainstream products) as downloadable PDFs. RPGNow created a separate storefront for low-selling or new entries to this market. Initial plans called for this storefront to use the "indie" moniker, but it was eventually decided to call the storefront RPGNow Edge instead. RPGNow Edge ceased operations in 2007. RPGNow and DriveThruRPG were consolidated into a single company, OneBookShelf, which maintained both sites initially. In August 2007, the two sites were rebranded, with RPGNow bearing the subtitle: "The leading source for indie rpgs". In February 2019, all elements of RPGNow (including purchase library) were redirected to similar pages on DriveThruRPG. In 2023, OneBookShelf merged with Roll20 to become Wolves of Freeport.

== Related game design movements ==
Some designers of indie role-playing games also participate in related tabletop role-playing game design movements such as Old School Renaissance, indie video game development, or live action role-playing game design such as Nordic LARP. Examples of indie role-playing game designers also working in related movements include Anna Anthropy, Sharang Biswas, Emily Care Boss, Banana Chan, Lucian Kahn, Jonaya Kemper, Jason Morningstar, and Jeeyon Shim.
