= Gamemaster =

Facilitator role in role-playing games

A gamemaster (GM), also known as a game master, game manager, game moderator, referee, storyteller, or master of ceremonies, is a person who acts as a facilitator, organizer, officiant regarding rules, arbitrator, and moderator for a multiplayer role-playing game. The act performed by a gamemaster is sometimes referred to as "gamemastering" or simply "GM-ing."

The role of a GM in a traditional tabletop role-playing game (TTRPG) is to weave together the other participants' player characters (PCs) stories, control the non-player characters (NPCs), describe or create environments in which the PCs can interact, and solve any player disputes. This basic role is the same in almost all traditional TTRPGs, with minor differences specific to differing rule sets. However, in some indie role-playing games, the GM role significantly differs from the traditional pattern. For example, in Powered by the Apocalypse systems, the other players assist the GM in creating both the NPCs and the details of the campaign setting.

The role of a gamemaster in an online game is to enforce the game's rules and provide general customer service.

Gaming systems have their own names for the role of the GM. For example, in Dungeons & Dragons, they are called "Dungeon Masters", in the World of Darkness games, they are called "storytellers", and in Powered by the Apocalypse games they are called a variety of names, such as "MCs" (master of ceremonies).

GMs are typically hobbyists; however, they are sometimes paid employees or entertainers for hire. This is more common for online games. Paid GMing was very uncommon for TTRPGs before the 2020s.

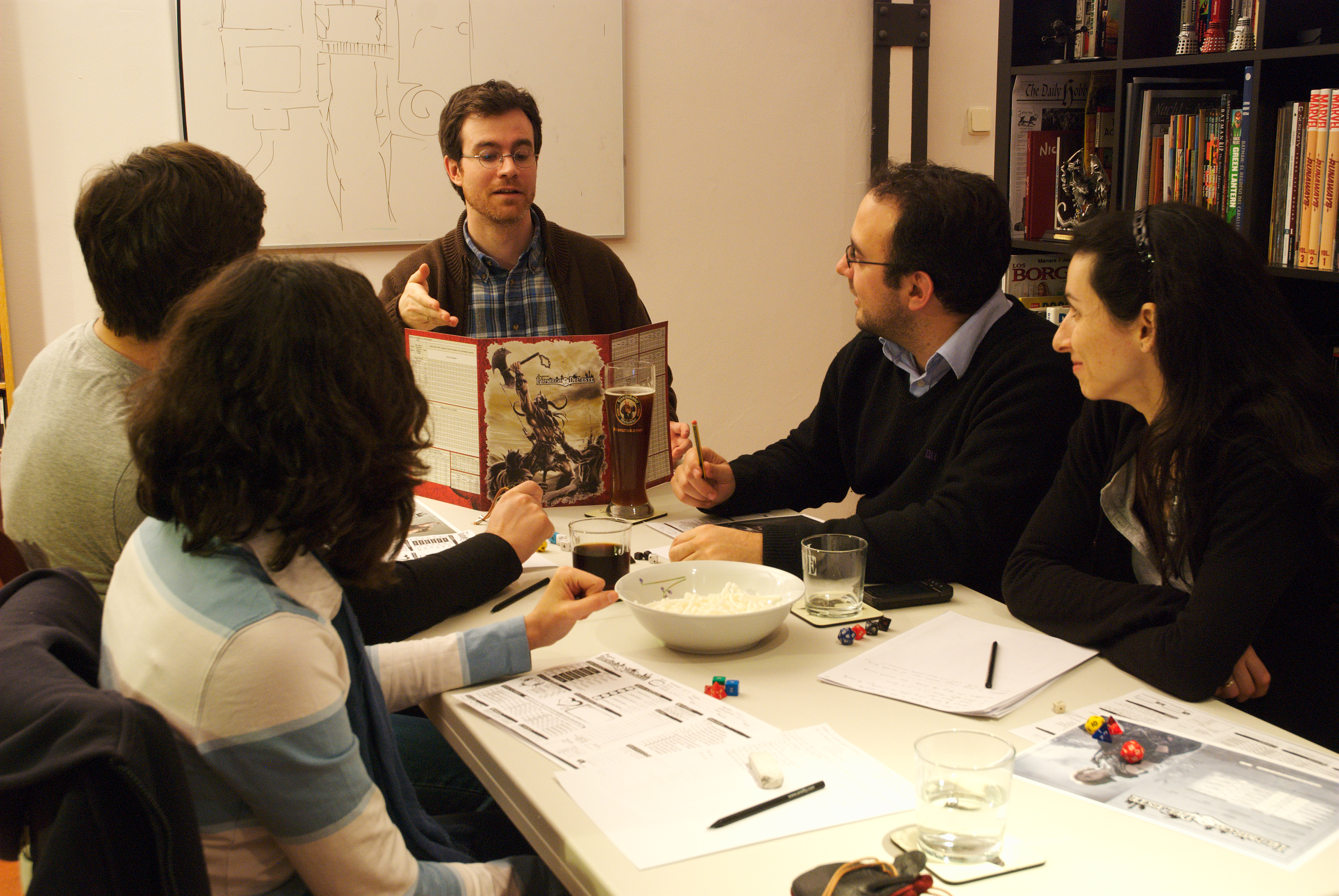
A gamemaster (center) and players in a tabletop role-playing game

== History and variants of the term ==
In a role-playing game context, the term gamemaster was first used by Dave Arneson while developing his game Blackmoor in 1971, although the first usage in print may have been Chivalry & Sorcery.

Each gaming system has its own name for the role of the gamemaster, such as "judge," "narrator," "referee," "director," or "storyteller," and these terms not only describe the role of the GM in general but also help define how the game is intended to be run. For example, the most famous of such terms, the "Dungeon Master" (or "DM") in Dungeons & Dragons, highlights the game's focus on dungeon crawling. The Storyteller System used in White Wolf Game Studio's storytelling games calls its GM the "storyteller," while the rules- and setting-focused Marvel Super Heroes role-playing game calls its GM the "judge." The cartoon inspired role-playing game Toon calls its GM the "animator." Some games apply flavorful names to the GM to fit the genre or setting, such as the Keeper of Arcane Lore (in the occult-themed Call of Cthulhu), the Hollyhock God (Nobilis, in which the hollyhock represents vanity), the Groundskeeper (in the spooky Bluebeard's Bride), the Mall Rat (in Visigoths vs. Mall Goths), or the Gaymaster (in LGBTQ-centered Thirsty Sword Lesbians).

The term gamemaster and the role associated with it have been used in the postal gaming hobby since the 1980s. In typical play-by-mail games, players control armies or civilizations and mail their chosen actions to the GM. The GM then mails the updated game state to all players on a regular basis. Usage in a wargaming context includes Guidon Games 1973 ruleset, Ironclad.

== In traditional tabletop role-playing games ==
The gamemaster prepares the game session for the players and the characters they play (known as player characters or PCs), describes the events taking place and decides on the outcomes of players' decisions. The gamemaster also keeps track of non-player characters (NPCs) and random encounters, as well as of the general state of the game world. The game session (or "adventure") can be metaphorically described as a play, in which the players are the lead actors, and the GM provides the stage, the scenery, the basic plot on which the improvisational script is built, as well as all the bit parts and supporting characters. Gamemasters can also be in charge of RPG board games making the events and setting challenges.

GMs may choose to run a game based on a published game world, with the maps and history already in place; such game worlds often have pre-written adventures. Alternatively, the GM may build their own world and script their own adventures.

== In online games ==
In early virtual worlds, gamemasters served as a moderator or administrator. In MUD game masters were called "wizards." Gamemastering in the form found in traditional role-playing games has also been used in semi-automatic virtual worlds. However, human moderation was sometimes considered unfair or out of context in an otherwise automated world. As online games expanded, gamemaster duties expanded to include being a customer service representative for an online community. A gamemaster in such a game is either an experienced volunteer player or an employee of the game's publisher. They enforce the game's rules by banishing spammers, player killers, cheaters, and hackers and by solving players' problems by providing general customer service. For their tasks they use special tools and characters that allow them to do things like teleport to players, summon items, and browse logs that record players' activities.

World of Warcraft has employees of Blizzard Entertainment that serve as gamemasters to help users with various problems in gameplay, chat, and other things like account and billing issues. A gamemaster in this game will communicate with players through chat that has blue text and they will also have a special "GM" tag and Blizzard logo in front of their names.

RuneScape has more than 500 moderators employed by Jagex to assist players and perform administrative duties in-game and on the site forums. These Jagex Moderators, as they are called, usually have the word "Mod" and a gold crown preceding their account names which ordinary players are not permitted to use. The game also has Player Moderators and Forum Moderators who are player volunteers helping with moderation, having the ability to mute (block from chatting) other players who violate rules.

In Helldivers 2, a third-person shooter by Arrowhead Game Studios, a single employee named Joel Hakalax functions as a game master for the game's colossal playerbase. The game features many real-time events where territory is gained or lost purportedly by the players' performance, which are determined at the discretion of the game master.

=== Additional online games ===
The now defunct America Online Online Gaming Forum used to use volunteers selected by applications from its user base. These people were simply referred to as OGFs by other members, and their screennames were indicative of their position (i.e., OGF Moose, etc.). While membership in the Online Gaming Forum had only one real requirement (that is, be a member of AOL), OGFs were given powers quite similar to AOL "Guides" and could use them at will to discipline users as they saw appropriate. Battleground Europe, a medium-sized MMOFPS, has a team of Game Moderators, anonymous volunteers who moderate the game. Miniconomy, a smaller text-based MMO, has a team of Federals, experienced players that help moderate the game and interactions. Transformice, an online multiplayer platformer, has a team of volunteer moderators called Mods who are experienced players that help moderate the game and interactions. ARMA 3, an open-world military tactical shooter, has a Zeus role that allows any player slotted in that role to place down almost any asset in the game including infantry and vehicles, objectives, intelligence, and score-keeping modules. The Zeus can also modify aspects of the world itself including time, weather, and wildlife to create dynamically progressing stories. Neverwinter Nights and Vampire: The Masquerade – Redemption are video game adaptations of tabletop role-playing games that are played online with one player acting as a traditional gamemaster.

== In pervasive games ==
Gamemastering, sometimes referred to as Orchestration is used in pervasive games to guide players along a trajectory desired by the game author. To ensure proper gamemastering can take place, four components are needed: some kind of sensory system to the game allowing the game masters to know current events, providing dynamic game information; dynamic and static game information lets game masters make informed decisions; decisions need to be actuated into the game, either through the game system or through manual intervention; and finally a communication structure is needed for both diegetic or non-diegetic communication. Effective gamemastering can require specialized user interfaces that are highly game specific.

== Gamemaster simulation ==
Certain sourcebooks simulate the decisions of a gamemaster by various means for either group or solo gaming. Dicebreaker highlighted that game master "emulators or oracles allow you to play a game and let dice or cards decide what happens next, instead of a human game master". With solo games, they noted that "many systems abstract the duties of running the game into dice rolls and random tables" while other systems "shift the focus away from numbers and maths in lieu of an experience akin to a Choose Your Own Adventure book".

=== Generative artificial intelligence ===
Generative artificial intelligence (AI), built off of large language models (LLMs), can also be used to simulate the actions of a gamemaster. In 2023, both Wired and Bell of Lost Souls highlighted the limitations of using ChatGPT as a dungeon master for Dungeons & Dragons. Wired commented that "ChatDM's taste for fantasy was often a bland amalgam of fantasy scenarios harvested from decades of D&D lore and Tolkienesque tropes" and it struggled "to maintain a consistent story". They noted this experience reminded them "that a good D&D adventure isn't like being told a story by a novelist or storyteller" as instead "the narrative unfolds communally around a table"; however, ChatD&D "ironically" might be "truer to the game's improv-oriented roots" as the "more free-form" nature means neither the players nor the dungeon master have "a clue as to where the adventure will go". Bell of Lost Souls noted "asking Chat-GPT to accomplish anything creative really highlights the limits of a Large Language Model" and that while it can produce "great idea-seeds", ChatGPT does not understand "the pacing of a scene in a game, or a story or adventure". They commented it is "fantastic at helping you iterate" and it can take "a lot of the grunt and guesswork out of the work of ideation" when working on plot development.

Polygon, Boing Boing and Wargamer reported on a July 2024 research paper, by graduate student Pavlos Sakellaridis, which examined the feasibility of a ChatGPT dungeon master built off of The Sunless Citadel (2000) adventure module and transcripts from the actual play web series Critical Role. Boing Boing noted that "Sakellaridis compared player experiences with both AI and human Dungeon Masters" – the results showed "surprising strengths" for the AI Dungeon Master and "while human DMs maintained a slight edge in most categories, the AI excelled at creating immersive environments, scoring 4.13 out of 5 compared to humans' 3.35". Wargamer similarly highlighted that the "results of his tests are interestingly mixed" with player reports rating the human dungeon master as "more competent, created better flow and narrative progression, and elicited more positive feelings overall", however, they "thought the AI DM was better at creating immersive environments". Wargamer commented that "Artificial Intelligence is a bit of a misnomer for Chat GPT" since it is an LLM "so the robo DM's ability to create an immersive environment, in a text-based exchange, doesn't mean that it's imaginative. LLMs have been specifically designed to digest large volumes of copyrighted material down to patterns, and then generate new text that fits into those patterns when prompted". Polygon stated that "the use of generative AI has been a point of repeated contention in the tabletop industry and beyond, with the technology's critics citing its environmental impact and its foundations on exploitative labor from both workers based in the global south and artists whose work is non consensually used to train the tech". Polygon highlighted that this academic study used "a complex slurry of variously licensed information, with some sourced from private companies, some sourced from a group of performers, and other materials sourced from volunteers" and it "has raised questions about the hazy nature of fan works" in relation "to consent in training" of LLMs.

== See also ==
- Dungeon Master
