= Dead Friend: A Game of Necromancy =

Ritualistic tabletop role-playing game

Dead Friend
A Game of Necromancy
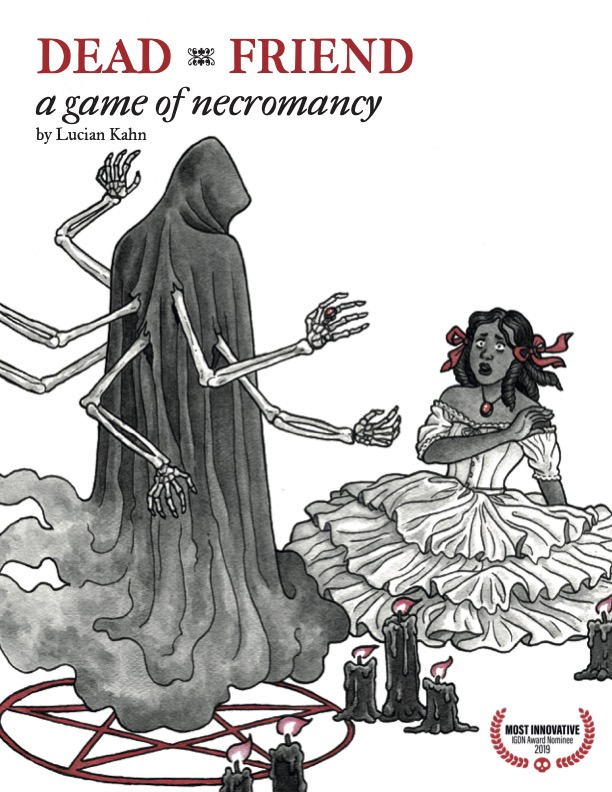
- Designers: Lucian Kahn
- Illustrators: Ezra Rose, Miriam Nadler
- Publishers: Hit Point Press
- Publication: 2018, 2023
- Genres: tabletop role-playing game, storytelling game, horror
- Players: 2

Dead Friend: A Game of Necromancy is a ritualistic storytelling game by Lucian Kahn. Throughout the game, two players act out a ceremony in which one resurrects the other from the dead. Dead Friend was nominated for the 2019 Indie Game Developer Network "Most Innovative" award.

== Gameplay ==
The manual is written as instructions for a necromancy ritual, and the game requires Tarot cards, two coins, matches, and salt. Instead of rolling dice, players draw Tarot cards to receive randomized storytelling prompts.

In an interview about Dead Friend with Alex Roberts for Backstory on One Shot Podcast Network, Roberts asked Kahn what components he thought about while writing a tabletop role-playing game in the form of a ritual. Kahn mentioned poetic use of repetition, cycles and circles, and movement of meaningful physical objects.

== Reception ==
Dead Friend was nominated for the 2019 Indie Game Developer Network "Most Innovative" award.

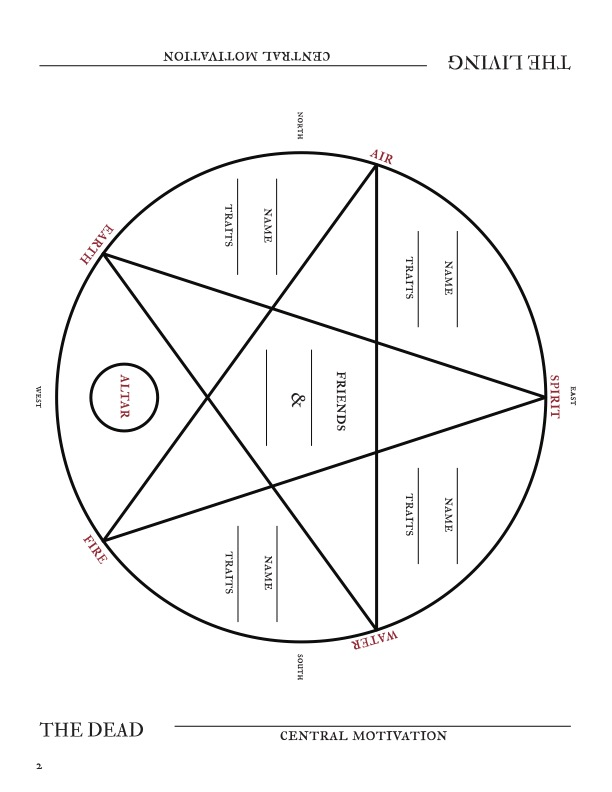
Interior image: Dead Friend: A Game of Necromancy play mat

Jess Kung for Polygon named Dead Friend the best game they played in 2022, writing that Dead Friend is "intimate, with space to bounce ideas around without being overwhelmed, with well-balanced agency between players in asymmetrical roles."

Joseph DeSimone for Gameosity wrote that Dead Friend "takes you through the various prompts to keep forward momentum in your unique story. This is done through the conceit of 'rituals,' which ends up working thanks to the thematic consistency of the game."

== Publication history ==
The first edition of Dead Friend was self-published in 2018 as an indie role-playing game through Indie Press Revolution (softcover) and Itch.io (PDF). In March 2023, Dead Friend was republished in softcover and PDF form by indie publisher Hit Point Press after their Kickstarter for Kahn's game If I Were a Lich, Man raised $84,590 from 2,049 backers.
