= X-Card =

Safety tool in role-playing games

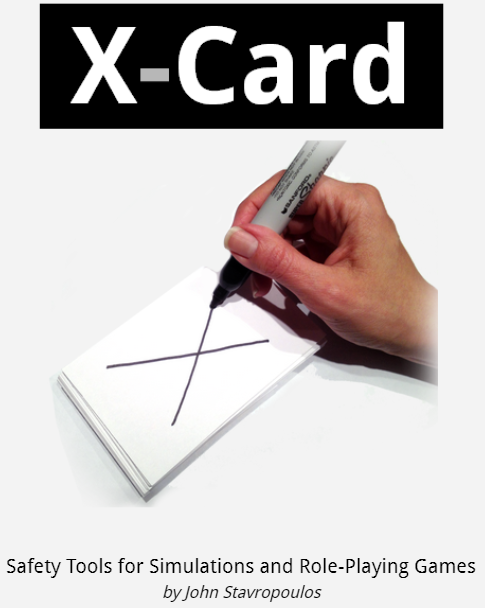
- Designers: John Stavropoulos
- Years active: 2013 to present
- Genres: Tabletop role-playing game
- Media type: Safety tool

The X-Card is a technique for moderating content while playing tabletop role-playing games, also known as a safety tool. Gameplay pauses when a player touches a card marked with an X, enabling the group to remove any uncomfortable material from the narrative and/or address players' mental and emotional wellbeing.

== Gameplay ==
X-Card: Safety Tools for Simulations and Role-Playing Games by John Stavropoulos

The X-Card is an auxiliary ruleset added to roleplaying or simulation games that allows all players, including the gamemaster, to remove content from the game if it has made a player uncomfortable. Players indicate that they want to edit out that content by tapping or holding up the X-Card. TTRPG Safety Toolkit states "the group can change, rewind, or skip the content" after the X-Card is used. Stavropoulos describes the physical X-Card as simply an X drawn on an index card by the player facilitating the introduction of this tool in a game. Consent in Gaming comments that a player may or may not wish to elaborate on "problem content" so boundaries can be updated after a game session where the X-Card is used. It is advised that the groups respect what the player is "willing to discuss and what they might simply want to leave in the past".

Stavropoulos highlighted that the X-Card gives players an "exit strategy" during an uncomfortable moment of gameplay. On why to use this safety tool, he stated that:

The X-Card creates a specific mood at the table. It says "We're here together. If you need to stop, we'll stop. The people playing are more important than the game we are playing." [...] Just having the X-Card present can increase the group's heightened awareness of everyone's risks and responsibilities. Even if the X-Card is never used, it still is a potent tool for getting everyone to think about each other first, and the game second.

== Publication history ==
The X-Card was invented by John Stavropoulos in 2013 who originally developed it for games with strangers, such as convention-based play. He released it under a Creative Commons Share Alike license (Note: Specifically, the Creative Commons Attribution-ShareAlike 3.0 Unported (CC BY-SA 3.0) License.) which enables other games to include it in instructional materials. The X-Card was one of several safety tools included in Consent in Gaming (2019) published by Monte Cook Games. It was also included in the TTRPG Safety Toolkit which won the 2020 ENNIE Award for "Best Free Game / Product". In 2021, Stavropoulos worked on the writing team for Van Richten's Guide to Ravenloft, the first official Dungeons & Dragons book to include the X-Card. Also in 2021, Evil Hat Productions created a free RPG Safety Toolkit for Roll20 that includes the X-Card. Soon after, Roll20 added X-Card functionality to its main user interface. Evil Hat stated that "a content warning and the use of Safety Tools (like the X card, Script Change, or Lines & Veils) creates an atmosphere of trust and respect. You're setting the boundaries".

== Reception ==
The X-Card is known for its simplicity of use and for helping players explore dark themes with the security of an agreed-upon way to stop. CBC Life called it "one of the most commonly-used tools". Rascal noted it was "one of the most ubiquitous safety tools out there". Mollie Russell of Wargamer compared the X-Card to consent tools in the BDSM community. The X-Card is also popular with LGBT players.

Maddie Cullen of Dicebreaker suggested the X-Card as the safety tool for when "something unexpected might still come up" even after determining game boundaries. Cullen stated that "this kind of thing takes minutes to discuss and makes sure everyone enjoys themselves". Rory Bristol of GeekDad wrote, "the X-Card helps a DM consider the needs of their group with a concise and simple tool. [...] Do what's best for your table, and if the X-Card can help even a little, put it to use, and everyone wins".

James D'Amato, in the book The Ultimate Micro-RPG Book (2020), commented that "if a player uses the X-Card, they are not being picky or difficult – they are playing by the rules. With this tool, there is an established protocol to be considerate of each other's comfort". D'Amato stated the pros of this safety tool are that it "streamlines communication" and is "easy to learn". However, as cons, D'Amato viewed the X-Card as a "reactive, not preventive" tool and that it "still requires someone to communicate in a difficult moment". Academics Matthew Guzdial et al also highlighted the limitations of safety tools such as the X-Card and others. They commented that the X-Card is "an example of changing the space of play during the game itself [...]. If players are uncomfortable or would like to shift the way that the story is going during play, they can tap or raise the X-Card and all players drop the current storytelling thread".

William J. White, a professor at Penn State Altoona, in a historical retrospect examined the early online discourse in The Forge diaspora on the X-Card including a discussion prompted by game designer Vincent Baker in 2013. White highlighted that Stavropoulos was an event organizer who developed the tool to help ensure a "positive experience in convention-based play" with strangers, however, many online commentators assumed "play takes place within stable, pre-existing groups" which is "an important distinction in understanding the issue". Some felt the X-Card "more or less obviously implies curtailing the range of normal activity at the table" and the tool was subject to ridicule while others "pointed to a legitimate need for safety mechanisms, challenging the critics on the jurisdictional grounds that they are misinterpreting the intent of the X-Card". In 2013, Baker felt that X-Card was an "unnecessary or harmful" game hack counter to the intentions of the game designer as "competent game designers" would be deliberate about including or excluding "emotional safety mechanisms". This position was challenged, including by Stavropoulos himself, and the ensuing online discussion outlined positive experiences using the X-Card. Baker has since "completely reversed" his position and stated "my take now is that stand-alone safety tools that players can bring with them from game to game are valuable and important".

== Games containing the X-Card ==
- Alice is Missing
- For the Queen (Alex Roberts)
- Star Crossed
- Thirsty Sword Lesbians (April Kit Walsh)
- Van Richten's Guide to Ravenloft
- Visigoths vs. Mall Goths (Lucian Kahn)
- World Wide Wrestling
