= Visigoths vs. Mall Goths =

Urban fantasy tabletop role-playing game

A Tabletop Roleplaying Game & Dating Sim
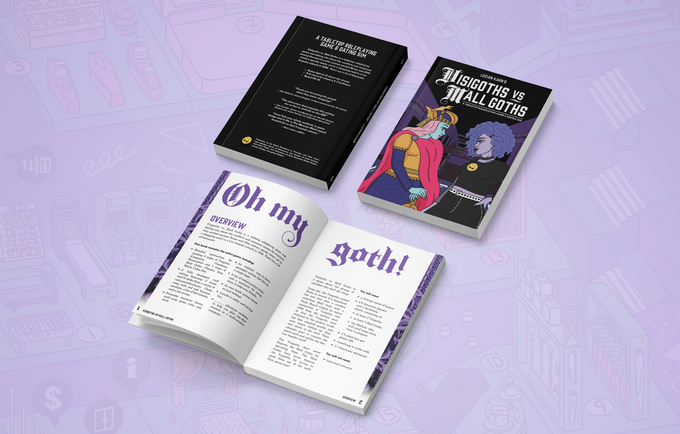
- Paperback book, exterior and interior
- Designers: Lucian Kahn
- Illustrators: Robin Eisenberg, Vee Hendro, Lluis Abadias Garcia, Olivia Fields, Jackson Tegu
- Publishers: Hit Point Press
- Publication: 2020; 6 years ago
- Genres: tabletop role-playing game, urban fantasy, comedy, romance
- Players: 4-6 plus GM
- Age range: teens and up
- Skills: Role-playing, improvisation

Visigoths vs. Mall Goths is an urban fantasy tabletop role-playing game with LGBTQ dating sim elements by Lucian Kahn, with art by Robin Eisenberg. The ancient Visigoths have time traveled to 1990s Los Angeles and are battling mall goths for control of the mall. The game's tone is silly and the setting has many puns. The game was inspired by 1990s movies The Craft, Empire Records, Bill & Ted's Excellent Adventure and Clueless. It was nominated for the ENNIE Awards and the Indie Game Developer Network awards.

== Gameplay ==
Players make characters in competing teams of two-three Visigoths and two-three Mall Goths. Conflicts are resolved by opposed rolls with two six-sided dice plus character class bonuses. Players can use embarrassing traits to offer a teammate a bonus. Characters are not physically hurt in combat but receive hurt feelings they can heal through dialogue.

== Adventures ==
Jonaya Kemper wrote the adventure "The Little Mx. Scare-All Pageant.”

== Design influences ==
According to the book, Visigoths vs. Mall Goths was influenced by the videogames EarthBound, Dragon Age: Origins, Monster Prom, and The Sims 3, and the tabletop roleplaying games Montsegur 1244, Witch: The Road to Lindesfarne, Shooting the Moon, Masks: A New Generation, and Dungeons & Dragons 5th edition.

== Reception ==
Visigoths vs. Mall Goths was nominated for the ENNIE Awards for "Best Writing" in 2020 and the Indie Game Developer Network award for "Best Setting" in 2021. It was in the exhibition "Game Play: Between Fantasy and Realism" at Museum of the Moving Image.

Kieron Gillen endorsed the game. Justin Joyce for Polygon recommended it as a game to try from Indie Press Revolution. Banana Chan for Dicebreaker called it one of the best games of 2020. Linda Codega for Gizmodo recommended it as a queer game to play for Pride Month. Trin Garritano, Games Digital Outreach Lead at Kickstarter, named it their favorite project of 2019. Visigoths vs. Mall Goths was featured as a four-part series on One Shot Podcast Network's flagship actual play podcast hosted by James D'Amato, author of Simon & Schuster's "Ultimate RPG" books. One Shot Podcast Network's show Character Creation Cast also aired a two-part episode about Visigoths vs. Mall Goths.

== Publication history ==
Visigoths vs. Mall Goths was originally self-published in hardcover, softcover, and PDF form through a Kickstarter campaign in October 2019 that met its initial goal in 24 hours and raised a total of $21,393 from 751 backers. It continued to be distributed in softcover and PDF form through Indie Press Revolution, Itch.io, and DriveThruRPG. A PDF version of the game was included in bundles on Itch.io to raise funds for various charitable causes, including abortion funds in the south and midwest of the US and funds for Ukrainians impacted by the Russian invasion.

In March 2023, Visigoths vs. Mall Goths was republished in softcover and PDF form by indie publisher Hit Point Press after their Kickstarter for Kahn's game If I Were a Lich, Man raised $84,590 from 2,049 backers.
