= Dialect (game) =

Tabletop role-playing game

- Publishers: Thorny Games
- Publication: 2019
- Genres: tabletop role-playing game, storytelling game
- Players: 3-5

Dialect, subtitled "A Game About Language And How It Dies", is a tabletop role-playing game that uses cards and collaborative storytelling to create a new jargon or pseudolanguage that develops, evolves and eventually dies. It was created by linguists Hakan Seyalioglu and Kathryn Hymes, and published by indie role-playing game publisher Thorny Games in 2016.

== Description ==
Dialect is a single-session game that does not have a gamemaster. Instead, 3–5 players take on the roles of a group of characters that are isolated, either physically or socially. The community is collaboratively designed by choosing a Backdrop from a list of over a dozen. Three Aspects to the backdrop are then put in place, two guided by the Backdrop, and one decided by the players. To complete the setting, the players decide on the characteristic that defines the Isolation of this community.

Players then create a character by choosing an Archetype from a card deck, which describes the character's role in the community, how other characters regard them, and how the character interacts with the Aspects of the Isolation.

This new community faces pressures (defined by drawing cards), and responds by making a new word from a root word and a prefix or suffix taken from a provided chart. Play continues through three eras defined by the players according to their community's situation — it could be three classes during high school or three tours of duty on a distant planet. The Backdrop guides the story as the new language continues to change and grow as the community flourishes; and then as the community diminishes and ends, the language dies.

At the end of the game, players relate the aftermath of the community and why the new language is no longer needed.

== Publication history ==
Dialect was developed by linguists Hakan Seyalioglu and Kathryn Hymes, who crowdsourced money for publication via Kickstarter. Seyalioglu connected the game to his experiences as a Turkish speaker in the United States, and Hymes described the game's theme of language as the basis of community, saying "Language is powerful — it's how we interact with each other … It is one of the most basic ways that groups form communal identity. Dialect tries to tap into that fundamental role that language plays in uniting communities." The game was published by Thorny Games in 2016.

In 2019, Swedish authors Johan Fahlvik Thilander and Max Wallinder published 3 Dialekter, describing three community settings — "The Midsummer Wreath", "The Dragonfly Preschool", and "Leprosy" — that could be used in a game of Dialect.

== Reception ==
Samantha Schoech for The New York Times recommended Dialect as a gift for frequent travelers, writing:

Part of the experience of traveling to another country is feeling lost in its language, and Dialect can help fill the gap. [...] At its heart, Dialect—which requires almost no setup but plenty of imagination—is as much a discussion of what language is and why it exists as it is a game.

Writing for The Wild Hunt, Eric O. Scott commented, "The structure of the game has a beautiful effect. As the game goes on, words that mean one thing in our daily speech come to take on very different shades of connotation." Scott concluded, "This is what games can do at their best: they allow us to live through the big questions in miniature, and with luck, bring some insight back with us when we return to the world outside."

Rob Abrazado noted, "playing the game adds a little something more than the usual exciting stories and fond memories that come from most roleplaying games. The act of constructing and sharing a whole new language creates not only a unique play experience with each session but also something special that continues to link players to each other long after the game session is over." Abrazado concluded, "Sharing a story with others is what roleplaying games are all about, but sharing a unique language with others is what makes this game truly stand out."

Ben Bisogno cited Dialect as an example of collaborative setting creation in tabletop role-playing games.

In the 2022 book Passion and Play: A Guide to Designing Sexual Content in Games, Sharang Biswas discussed how Dialect treats the theme of language and power.

In his 2023 book Monsters, Aliens, and Holes in the Ground, RPG historian Stu Horvath noted, "Dialect isn't an easy game. Despite the brief rules, which are clear and extremely supportive of play at every step, it suffers somewhat from the intrinsic problem of storytelling games: Shy folks, those with stage fright, and people who are methodical rather than improvisational in their thinking, will likely struggle." Horvath also pointed out that the game was designed as a single session, commenting, "Leaving that shared experience behind has a whiff of melancholy about it ... the climax is always the same — the isolated community is no longer isolated and, in rejoining the larger whole, it and its language are destroyed."

== Awards ==
- 2019 ENnie Awards: Dialect was awarded a Silver Medal in the category "Best Game".
- 2019 Indie Game Developer Network Award: Winner of "Game of the Year."
- 2019 IndieCade: Finalist for "Best Game: Tabletop"
- 2019 IndieCade Europe: Winner in the category "Best Game: Tabletop"

== Related works ==
Seyalioglu and Hymes have produced two other games on the topic of language and linguistics. Sign is a historically based game about deaf children in Nicaragua who developed their own sign language in 1970. Sign won the Indie RPG Award for "Best Free Game" in 2015. In 2024, the duo released Xenolanguage, a game about scientists learning to communicate with aliens, inspired by the film Arrival.
