= For the Queen =

For the Queen may refer to:

- For the Queen (game), a role-playing game by Alex Roberts (game designer)
- An album by Tomcraft
