= Naomi Clark (game designer) =

American game designer and professor

- Clark (center) with fellow attendees at the 2018 Game Developers Conference
- Occupations: Game designer, professor
- Employer: Chair of NYU Game Center
- Notable work: Consentacle
- Awards: IndieCade

Naomi Clark is a Japanese American game designer, writer, and professor who currently serves as the departmental chair of NYU Game Center at New York University Tisch School of the Arts. During Clark's term as chair of the department, NYU Game Center has been ranked by The Princeton Review as the top school for game design. Her games often address LGBTQ themes. She designed Consentacle, a science fiction cooperative board game, which raised $154,609 on Kickstarter and won the IndieCade Impact Award. Clark co-wrote the book A Game Design Vocabulary with Anna Anthropy. Clark is a member of New York City's Game Development Industry Council.

== Career ==
Clark began developing games for a living in 1999. As of 2018, she has worked on over thirty-five released games for various companies, including Lego. Clark became a full-time faculty member of NYU Game Center in 2015, after teaching courses at New York Film Academy, Parsons, and the School of Visual Arts.

In addition to Consentacle, Clark has written multiple games that explore queerness, gender, and sexuality. Clark was a co-developer of Sissyfight 2000 in the 1990s and helped relaunch it as an open source game through a Kickstarter campaign in 2013. Leigh Alexander for Game Developer (website) writes that "New York-based veteran developer Naomi Clark is fundamentally a brilliant designer first, a sexual politician second." Clark appeared in the 2014 documentary film Gaming in Color by MidBoss about queer people in gaming. In 2015, Clark developed Lacerunner, an eighteenth-century reimagining of Netrunner. Clark was interviewed for Polygon about how interactive fiction games on Twine help generate empathy for LGBTQ experiences. Clark wrote the essay “What is Queerness in Games, Anyway?” in the 2017 anthology Queer Game Studies. She wrote the foreword of Honey & Hot Wax, an anthology of sexuality-themed live action role-playing games edited by Sharang Biswas and Lucian Kahn.

Keith Stuart for The Guardian named Clark and Anthropy's book A Game Design Vocabulary as one of twenty books every player should read, writing that, "this excellent manual gives you an entire framework and language for thinking about how games are constructed."

Clark focuses on the significance of games in society. In a 2022 interview with Axios, she said that "play and games, even when we think of them as escapism, gain part of their power and meaning from the roots they have in the rest of society and culture.” She has been a member of New York City's Game Development Industry Council since its inception in 2022.
