= Jiangshi: Blood in the Banquet Hall =

Jiangshi fiction tabletop role-playing game

- Designers: Banana Chan and Sen-Foong Lim
- Publishers: Game and a Curry, Wet Ink Games
- Publication: 2021
- Genres: tabletop role-playing game, Jiangshi fiction, horror
- Chance: High
- Skills: role-playing

Jiangshi: Blood in the Banquet Hall is a tabletop role-playing game about Chinese immigrants to North America managing a family restaurant while battling Jiangshi, legendary hopping vampires. The game was designed by Banana Chan and Sen-Foong Lim, who are both Chinese immigrants. It was published independently in 2021 after a Kickstarter campaign raised over US$100,000. The instructions focus heavily on authentic portrayals of Chinese history and immigrant experiences. The game's tone can range from serious to comedy horror. Themes include fighting racism, exploring intergenerational knowledge and relationships, coping with economic hardship, and working together as a family.

== Settings ==
The default scenario takes place in San Francisco's Chinatown during the 1920s, but the game box comes with the Haunted Tales Scenario Book, which offers more adventures in different cities and historical periods. The settings and adventures in the Haunted Tales Scenarios Book were created by twelve different writers, including Jeeyon Shim, Sharang Biswas, and Lucian Kahn.

== Gameplay ==
During daylight phases, players manage the Chinese restaurant, then during nighttime phases, the Jiangshi appear. Successfully running the restaurant gives players bonuses to fight the Jiangshi, while unfinished chores generate mechanical consequences.

The game mechanics mix elements typical of both tabletop role-playing games and board games.

== Reception ==
In 2022, Jiangshi: Blood in the Banquet Hall won the Silver ENNIE Award for "Best Setting" and was also nominated for "Best Production Value" and "Product of the Year." The game was nominated for the 2022 Indie Game Developer Network award for "Most Innovative."
