= Schmekel =

Jewish folk punk band

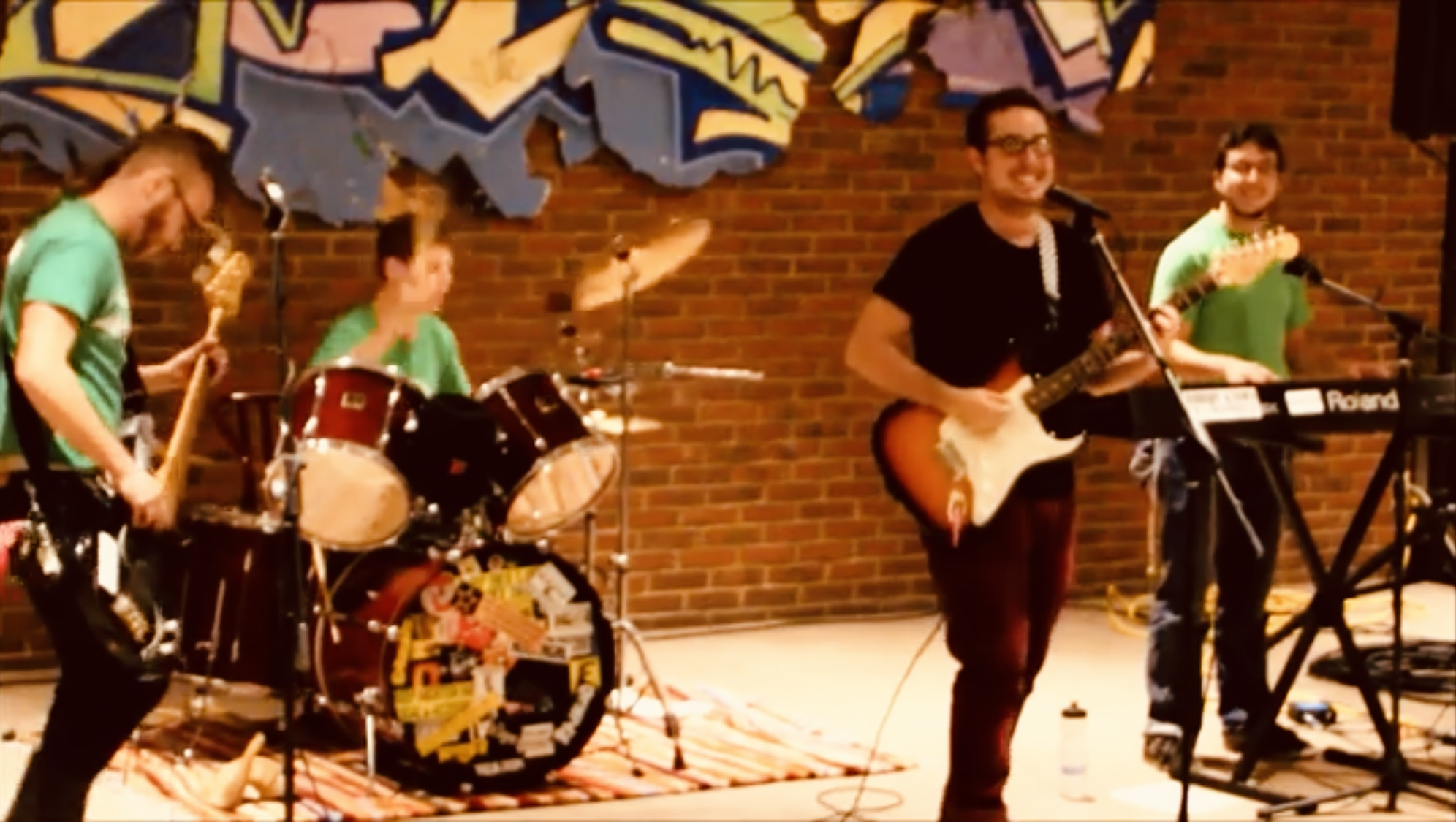
- Schmekel at Hampshire College (2012)

Background information
- Origin: Brooklyn, New York, United States
- Genres: Folk punk, queercore
- Years active: 2010–2014
- Label: Schmekel Music
- Members: Lucian Kahn (guitar and vocals); Ricky Riot (keyboard and vocals); Nogga Schwartz (bass and shofar); Simcha Halpert-Hanson (drums)

Schmekel was an all-transgender, Jewish folk punk band from Brooklyn, New York, known for their satirical lyrical material. Schmekel made their audiences more comfortable with transgender topics through jokes, but also often included lyrical references to obscure queer, Jewish, and punk content that only cultural insiders would recognize. Their most popular song was "FTM at the DMV" (released in 2013), which has over 400,000 plays on Spotify as of 2024.

Hugh Ryan for The New York Times compared Schmekel's sound to Pansy Division and compared Lucian Kahn's songwriting to Jewish singer-songwriter and satirist Tom Lehrer. The Advocate compared Schmekel to Pansy Division and Tribe 8, and the book Listen to Punk Rock! Exploring a Musical Genre compared Schmekel's song "I'll Be Your Maccabee" to Pansy Division's song "Homo Christmas."

Schmekel was active from 2010 to 2014. They broke up in February 2014 to focus on other projects.

== Discography ==
- Queers On Rye – December 2011
- The Whale That Ate Jonah (Schmekel Music) – October 2013

== Performances ==
Schmekel performed with other Jewish punk bands local to Brooklyn, such as The Shondes, at New York City venues like the Knitting Factory, the Delancey, Public Assembly, and Otto's Shrunken Head. They also played at colleges in the Eastern United States like Brandeis University, Yale University, State University of New York at Purchase, Hampshire College and the University of Mary Washington, sponsored by Jewish and LGBT student clubs. Schmekel's egg salad sandwich logo was created by queer illustrator and punk rocker Cristy Road while Schmekel was performing with her band The Homewreckers.

== Jewish cultural influence ==
Eddy Portnoy of The Forward cited Schmekel as an example of the cultural movement "Queer Yiddishkeit." Schmekel's lyrics frequently referred to Jewish holidays, and their first album started with Kahn sounding the Yom Kippur "tekiah" and bassist Nogga Schwartz blowing a shofar before launching into a punk song. The Jewish Music Resource Centre at Hebrew University of Jerusalem noted that Schmekel's music used "direct musical quotes from traditional Jewish melodies such as Chad Gadya, Ma'oz Tzur, and Al Chet". Professor of Musicology Edwin Seroussi compared Schmekel's tongue-in-cheek allusions to prayers to similar inside jokes in Yiddish theatre and vaudeville at the turn of the 20th century.

According to an interview with Tablet Magazine, the different members of Schmekel participated in different amounts of religious observance but had all experienced difficulty in synagogue because of being transgender, which they addressed in their music. However, in an interview with Jewcy, they expressed feeling accepted at Congregation Beit Simchat Torah and Nehirim.

== In literature ==
In the Tales of the City novel The Days of Anna Madrigal (2014), the character Jake reports his love interest, Amos, flirting with the lead singer of Schmekel.

Schmekel was part of a course at Hampshire College in 2015 about the creation of Jewish identity.

== Other projects ==
After Schmekel broke up, singer and guitarist Lucian Kahn became a writer and game designer of tabletop role-playing games with LGBT, Jewish, and subcultural themes, making Visigoths vs. Mall Goths and If I Were a Lich, Man, a set of comedic Jewish games about creative resistance against authoritarianism. Keyboardist Itai Gal (Ricky Riot) formed a new band called Itai and the Ophanim and released Arise (2019), an album of traditional and original religious music, including "prayers for justice and unity among humans and Earth." Bassist Nogga Schwartz began working in healthcare. Drummer Simcha Halpert-Hanson became a rabbi.

== See also ==
- Jews in punk rock
