= Gina Darling =

American internet personality and television host

- Born: July 25, 1989 (age 37); San Jose, California, U.S.
- Occupations: Internet personality; television host; streamer; actress; podcaster
- Years active: 2008–present

Gina Darling (born July 25, 1989) is an American internet personality, television host, actress, Twitch streamer, and podcaster. She is known for co-hosting Attack of the Show! during its 2021–2022 revival on G4 and for her YouTube channel ExSuperVillain. She also co-hosted the G4/WWE game show Arena alongside Austin Creed and appeared as a cast member on Critical Role's Candela Obscura. In 2021, she was signed by WME for representation in gaming and esports.

== Early life ==
Darling was born in San Jose, California, and is of Vietnamese and Russian descent. She grew up in the San Francisco Bay Area and moved to Los Angeles at the age of 15. She has said that video games helped her through a difficult childhood, which later motivated her charitable work. Growing up, she was one of few female gamers at her school.

== Career ==
=== YouTube and online content (2008–2021) ===
In 2008, Darling launched her YouTube channel, ExSuperVillain, where she posted content related to video games, comedy, and lifestyle topics. She became involved in the Asian American YouTube community in Los Angeles, appearing as a recurring cast member on JustKiddingFilms and frequently guesting on the discussion show JustKiddingNews. She also collaborated with YouTuber David So on his channel DavidSoComedy. Prior to joining G4, she had worked with brands including the Discovery Channel and McDonald's.

Darling hosted Dark Room, a live-streamed gaming show on Machinima. She also streamed on Twitch under the handle MissGinaDarling, where she achieved Partner status and was streaming six days a week prior to joining G4.

In January 2020, Darling was one of four female gamers and streamers featured in a "Game Face" campaign by esports organization Gen.G and Benefit Cosmetics, alongside KittyPlays, Nicki Taylor, and Jayden Diaz. The campaign highlighted the beauty routines and stories of professional female gamers.

In 2013, Darling appeared as a cast member in the reality television series Roll Models, a spin-off of the series K-Town that documents Asian American youth culture in Southern California.

In 2017, Darling directed and starred in the short comedy film Things Vietnamese Parents Do!, which drew on her Vietnamese heritage.

=== G4 and WME representation (2021–2022) ===
In June 2021, Darling was announced as one of the hosts for the revival of G4, alongside Jirard Khalil. She described joining G4 as a "dream come true", having grown up watching the network daily after school and citing Morgan Webb as an inspiration. Darling has said she initially thought the G4 offer was a scam, and found out about her hiring while on a snow vacation. That same month, she was signed by talent agency WME for representation in gaming and esports, alongside other content creators including Cloakzy. Prior to signing with WME, she had been self-managed for over eleven years. She served as a co-host on the revived Attack of the Show!, which returned on November 16, 2021.

During her time at G4, Darling co-hosted Arena, a game show produced in collaboration with WWE and sponsored by Xfinity, alongside Austin Creed. The show premiered on June 29, 2022, airing on G4's Twitch channel and WWE's UpUpDownDown YouTube channel. Darling adopted the persona name "Fuego Fang" for her appearances on UpUpDownDown. She also appeared on the G4 Dungeons & Dragons series Invitation to Party and was a regular on Attack of the Show: Vibe Check, as well as appearing on Name Your Price and The Feedback.

In 2021, Darling collaborated with the Heart and Armor Foundation to donate PlayStation 5 consoles to military veteran families as part of a promotional campaign for the Amazon Prime Video film Tom Clancy's Without Remorse. She also participated in G4's Summer Meltdown charity streaming event, which raised money for the Pablove Foundation for pediatric cancer research. Darling has expressed a long-term goal of providing gaming consoles and computers to children's hospitals, stating that she wanted to offer children going through hardships "even five minutes of relief and joy".

G4 ceased operations in October 2022 following Comcast's decision to shut down the network.

=== Tabletop gaming and later work (2022–present) ===
In 2022, Darling played the character Bac Si—a Kender Grave Cleric whose name means "doctor" in Vietnamese—in Legends of the Multiverse, a Dungeons & Dragons actual play series produced for the official Dungeons & Dragons YouTube channel. She chose the name as a nod to her heritage, saying: "I've never seen a Vietnamese main character in a game. So I decided to do it myself."

In September 2023, Darling made her Critical Role debut in a Mortal Kombat 1 one-shot, playing Kitana alongside Sam Riegel, Noshir Dalal, and Travis Willingham. She subsequently appeared on Critical Role's Candela Obscura as Cordelia Glask in Chapter 3 ("The Circle of Tide and Bone"), alongside Riegel, Dalal, Liam O'Brien, and Ashly Burch.

In 2023, Darling reunited with several former G4 colleagues for an episode of Dirty Laundry on Dropout, joining Ally Beardsley and other former Attack of the Show! hosts.

In September 2023, Darling launched the YouTube podcast Spill It with fellow former G4 host Ovilee May. She had previously co-hosted the podcast Big Mood (originally titled Hey B*tch!) with Nikki Limo, Tiffany Del Real, and Jessica Caldwell.

In 2025, Darling appeared in Smosh Presents: We're All Gonna Die, a live tabletop role-playing game show produced by Smosh at the Dynasty Typewriter in Los Angeles, playing the character Stevie C. Gull.

== Personal life ==
In March 2021, Darling publicly accused her ex-boyfriend, TikTok creator Read Choi, of manipulative behavior toward women, posting a multi-part video series on TikTok detailing her experiences. Choi, who had over 5.8 million TikTok followers, subsequently posted a public apology on Instagram in which he acknowledged having "mistreated these women". In September 2021, Choi faced further scrutiny after a GoFundMe campaign he created for a homeless woman raised over $20,000; an investigation by fellow TikToker Dthekorean found that the woman was unaware of the funds, and GoFundMe confirmed it required documentation before releasing money. Darling publicly supported the investigation. In November 2025, additional women made similar allegations against Choi, which were reported by International Business Times.

== Filmography ==
| Year | Title | Role | Notes |
|---|---|---|---|
| 2013 | Roll Models | Herself | Reality television series; 8 episodes |
| 2017 | Things Vietnamese Parents Do! | Mother | Short film; also directed |
| 2021–2022 | Attack of the Show! | Herself (host) | Television series |
| 2021–2022 | Invitation to Party | Herself | G4/D&D series |
| 2022 | Arena | Herself (co-host) | G4/WWE/Xfinity game show |
| 2022 | Legends of the Multiverse | Bac Si | D&D actual play series; 4 episodes |
| 2022 | Name Your Price | Herself | Television series |
| 2023 | Mortal Kombat 1 one-shot | Kitana | Critical Role actual play one-shot |
| 2023 | Candela Obscura | Cordelia Glask | Actual play series; Chapter 3 |
| 2023 | Dirty Laundry | Herself | Dropout series; with former G4 hosts |
| 2023–present | Spill It | Herself (co-host) | YouTube podcast with Ovilee May |
| 2025 | Smosh Presents: We're All Gonna Die | Stevie C. Gull | Live TTRPG show |
