= Consentacle =

Science fiction cooperative board game

- Designers: Naomi Clark
- Illustrators: James Harvey
- Publication: 2018
- Genres: board game, science fiction, tentacle erotica
- Players: 2
- Age range: 18+

Consentacle is a science fiction cooperative board game about negotiating consensual sex between two femme characters: a human astronaut and a tentacled alien. It was designed by Naomi Clark and illustrated by James Harvey. Consentacle was published in 2018 after a successful Kickstarter campaign raised $154,609. The prototype for Consentacle won the Impact Award at IndieCade 2015.

== Themes ==
Clark, who is part Japanese, was inspired by the idea of reclaiming hentai to represent positive queer relationships. In a 2019 interview with Alex Meehan for Tabletop Gaming, she explained, "I believed that the concept could be reclaimed and turned around; Consentacle is not what people expect from a game with tentacles in it."

== Gameplay ==
Consentacle is played silently and challenges players' nonverbal communication skills. Each player has a deck of cards. Players play cards in particular combinations to earn tokens representing trust and satisfaction. To earn satisfaction tokens, players must share their trust tokens.

== Related Works ==
Following Consentacle's publication, Clark wrote the foreword to Honey & Hot Wax, a 2020 anthology of live action role-playing games on the theme of sex and sexuality.
