= Dead Friend (disambiguation) =

Dead Friend is a 2004 horror film directed by Kim Tae-gyeong.

Dead Friend or Dead Friends may also refer to:

- Dead Friend: A Game of Necromancy, a 2018 tabletop role-playing game
- "Dead Friend", a song by Against Me! from the album Transgender Dysphoria Blues
- "Dead Friends", a song by Demi Lovato from the album Holy Fvck
- "Dead Friends", a song by Doomriders from the album Grand Blood
- "Dead Friends", a song by Rich the Kid from the album The World Is Yours (Rich the Kid album)
