= IGDN =

IGDN may refer to:

- Indie Game Developer Network (IGDN)
- the International Game Developers Network, which ran from 1996 to 1999, then merged into the International Game Developers Association
