= Good Society (game) =

Jane Austen role-playing game

A Jane Austen RPG
- Designers: Hayley Gordon and Vee Hendro
- Illustrators: Raven Warner, Aviv Or
- Publishers: Storybrewers
- Publication: 2018
- Genres: tabletop role-playing game, live action role-playing game
- Skills: role-playing, storytelling, letter writing

Good Society is a tabletop role-playing game based upon the Regency era novels of Jane Austen. A live action role-playing game version is also available. Good Society was created by the two-woman Australian indie role-playing game design team Storybrewers, consisting of lead writer Hayley Gordon and graphic designer Vee Hendro. In addition to role-playing, the game mechanics include spreading rumors and writing letters. It can be played with or without a gamemaster.

== Reception ==
Good Society won the 2019 Indie Game Developer Network award for "Best Rules."

Dimension 20's ten-part actual play series A Court of Fey and Flowers used a combination of Good Society and Dungeons & Dragons for its campaign. Good Society was featured as a two-part series on One Shot Podcast Network’s flagship actual play podcast hosted by James D'Amato, author of Simon & Schuster's "Ultimate RPG" books. Chase Carter for Polygon recommended it for fans of Bridgerton and Our Flag Means Death.

In 2022, a Kickstarter campaign to reprint Good Society raised AU$148,059.
