= Honey & Hot Wax =

Anthology of role-playing games

- Editors: Sharang Biswas and L. Kahn
- Author: Sharang Biswas, Julia Bond Ellingboe, Kat Jones, L. Kahn, Jonaya Kemper, Yeonsoo Julian Kim, Will Morningstar, Alex Roberts (game designer), Susanne, Naomi Clark, Maury Brown
- Illustrators: Jana Heidersdorf, Jen McCleary
- Language: English
- Genre: tabletop role-playing game, live action role-playing game
- Publisher: Pelgrane Press
- Publication date: 2020
- Awards: IndieCade nominee, Indie Game Developer Network nominee

Honey & Hot Wax is an anthology of artistic tabletop and live action role-playing games on the theme of sexuality, published by Pelgrane Press in 2020. It includes games by nine designers, a foreword by the academic chair of NYU Game Center, and a chapter on consent.

Honey & Hot Wax received two grants from a nonprofit organization for reducing sexual shame through art and education. The book was nominated for an IndieCade Award and an Indie Game Developer Network award.

== Games ==
The book is marked for adult audiences only, with "games of imagination and pretend for mature, consenting adults."

The anthology is divided into two sections called "This World" and "Other Worlds." The games in "This World" take place in real-world settings. Pop! by Alex Roberts is about an online forum of balloon fetishists. The Echo of the Unsaid by Sharang Biswas is about sexual tension between heterosexual male college roommates. The Sleepover by Julia Bond Ellingboe and Kat Jones is about teenagers who share information about sexuality and gender identity at a slumber party. Follow My Lead by Suzanne is about dominance and submission and is played blindfolded. Pass the Sugar, Please by Yeonsoo Julian Kim is about tea party guests covertly discussing the past night's erotic encounters through descriptions of tea and sandwiches.

The games in "Other Worlds" take place in speculative fiction settings. In the Clefts of the Rock by L. Kahn is a surrealist game about imagining human bodies as landscapes on other planets. Feeding Lucy by Jonaya Kemper is based on Dracula by Bram Stoker. You Inside Us is about a romance between a human and an alien who inhabits the human's body through symbiosis.

== Reception ==
=== Awards and Grants ===
In 2020-2021, Honey & Hot Wax was nominated for an IndieCade award and an Indie Game Developer Network award for "Game of the Year." The collection received 2 grants from the Effing Foundation for Sex Positivity, a nonprofit organization for reducing sexual shame through art and education.

=== Scholarship ===
In Nordic Erotic Larp: Designing for Sexual Arousal, game scholars Hanne Grasmo and Jaakko Stenros discuss Follow My Lead by Susanne for its use of non-verbal game mechanics through abstracted actions, examples of play, erotic engagement, power play, loosely scripted scenes, and gender inclusion.

=== Reviews ===
Author Cecilia Tan called Honey & Hot Wax "a fabulous collection of 'let's pretend' games." Banana Chan for Dicebreaker listed the collection among her favorite games of 2020.

== Related works ==
=== Performances ===
Honey & Hot Wax's game Pass the Sugar, Please by Yeonsoo Julian Kim was staged in Salem, Massachusetts as an immersive theater production by Intramersive, both in-person and virtually. Kathryn Yu for No Proscenium called it "the standout this year" for immersive theatre productions "in its earnest urging for us to be honest and open about our pleasures and pains". Kim also co-wrote the nonbinary storytelling game Women are Werewolves.

=== Publications ===
In the year following publication, Honey & Hot Wax co-editor Sharang Biswas and contributor Yeonsoo Julian Kim co-edited its "spiritual successor" Strange Lusts, an online anthology of interactive fiction about sex and sexuality. Strange Lusts was published in 2021 by Strange Horizons. In addition to work by Biswas and Kim, it includes pieces by Anna Anthropy, Nibedita Sen, and Natalia Theodoridou.

Biswas also wrote the chapter "Sex and Game Design (Part 2): Mechanics and Verbs" in the book Passion and Play: A Guide to Designing Sexual Content in Games by Michelle Clough.
