= Darrington Press =

Tabletop game imprint

- Parent company: Critical Role Productions
- Founded: October 2020; 6 years ago
- Country of origin: United States
- Distribution: International
- Key people: Matthew Mercer (creative advisor); Chris Perkins (Creative Director); Jeremy Crawford (Game Director)
- Publication types: Tabletop games, books
- Fiction genres: Fantasy
- Official website: darringtonpress.com

Darrington Press is the tabletop game imprint for Critical Role Productions which launched in October 2020. Jeremy Crawford is the Game Director and Chris Perkins is the Creative Director, with Matthew Mercer as the creative advisor. The publishing label primarily produces board and card games along with role-playing games. It won two ENNIE Awards in 2022 – "Fan Award for Best Publisher" and "Best Setting Gold Award" for Tal'Dorei Campaign Setting Reborn.

The publishing label is named after the fictional player character Taryon Darrington played by Sam Riegel in Critical Role's first campaign who, in-universe, published a book on his exploits with the adventuring party Vox Machina.

== History ==
In October 2020, Critical Role Productions announced a "new board and card game" imprint called Darrington Press; it was led by Ivan Van Norman with Matthew Mercer as the creative advisor. ICv2 commented that "Critical Role has broadly influenced tabletop gaming since splitting from Geek & Sundry in 2018". During the launch, Van Norman stated, "Darrington Press is not looking to utilize crowdfunding for any game releases". Darrington Press initially announced a slate of four upcoming games: Uk'otoa, Critical Role Adventures, Syndicult, and Guardians of Matrimonia. Uk'otoa released in May 2021 with mixed reviews; IGN called it a "solid first impression for what Darrington Press will offer in future games" while Polygon called it a "Critical Role bauble" with unfun gameplay.

In January 2022, Darrington Press released the campaign setting sourcebook Tal'Dorei Campaign Setting Reborn which is a revised edition of the out of print Critical Role: Tal'Dorei Campaign Setting sourcebook published by Green Ronin Publishing. In March 2022, the imprint released more development details on both Syndicult and Guardians of Matrimonia. In June 2022, A Familiar Problem was released for Free RPG Day.

In March 2023, Darrington Press published the two player board game Till the Last Gasp which received mostly positive reviews. The label also announced that they would reprint two out of print Critical Role art books in 2023: The Chronicles of Exandria Vol. I: The Tale of Vox Machina (2017) and The Chronicles of Exandria Vol. 2: The Legend of Vox Machina (2018).

The imprint's first "State of the Press" in April 2023 released updates on previously announced games and revealed new games in development; this included two new roleplaying game systems – Illuminated Worlds for short campaigns and Daggerheart for longer campaigns – which were scheduled to have a public playtest during Gen Con in August 2023. The announcement stated that while Guardians of Matrimonia, being redesigned by Banana Chan and Yeonsoo Julian Kim, and Syndicult are still in development, Critical Role Adventures is now on indefinite hold. Charlie Hall, for Polygon, stated that "Darrington Press has had mixed success so far with its creations" and commented that Illuminated Worlds was "perhaps the most interesting of the three new products" announced given co-designer Layla Adelman's background as "an accomplished game developer" who is also a member of the Off Guard Games team which has produced titles such as "the well-regarded Band of Blades and Scum and Villainy". Christian Hoffer of ComicBook.com called the announcement of new fantasy role-playing game systems "notable" since "Critical Role has a massive built-in audience of TTRPG fans, so a good fantasy genre TTRPG offering could make a major splash in the Dungeons & Dragons-dominated TTRPG market. Additionally, many have wondered whether Critical Role would potentially switch to an in-house TTRPG system for a future campaign, thus breaking away from Dungeons & Dragons altogether".

In May 2023, Critical Role Productions announced a new monthly horror–themed actual play web series titled Candela Obscura which will use the Illuminated Worlds System. Darrington Press released the Candela Obscura Quickstart Guide on May 25, the show's premiere date, which introduces both the Candela Obscura campaign setting and the game system. Darrington Press also ran gameplay sessions of Candela Obscura at Gen Con before the release of the Candela Obscura Core Rulebook in November 2023.

The open beta playtest of Daggerheart began on March 12, 2024; this playtest was made available at select game stores, as a PDF or on Demiplane via the Daggerheart Nexus. The Nexus edition includes digital character creation tools. Hayley McCullough, for the American Journalism, speculated that Daggerheart may allow Critical Role "to fully sever its connections to Dungeons & Dragons and allow Mercer and the other players to use Daggerheart as their go-to system going forward". She commented that the "potential rippling consequences of such a move" is worth keeping an eye on. Daggerheart was released in May 2025. The Age of Umbra limited series also started airing that month; the series features the cast of Critical Role playing Daggerheart in the "Age of Umbra" campaign frame created by Mercer for the system. Darrington Press also produced Get Your Sheet Together, a Daggerheart how to play web series, which began airing in May 2025. Additionally in 2025, Darrington Press signed a sales and distribution agreement for U.S. and international markets with Macmillan Publishers to expand the release of their roleplaying game books in "the book channel, in addition to its existing distribution in the hobby channel". Lin Codega of Rascal noted this included both "their new fantasy heartbreaker, Daggerheart," and "their backlist" titles.

In June 2025, it was announced that both Jeremy Crawford and Chris Perkins would be joining Darrington Press. Crawford became the company's Game Director while Perkins became the Creative Director which matches their former roles at Wizards of the Coast. Perkins succeeded Travis Willingham, who is additionally CEO of Critical Role Productions. Company Director Van Norman also announced his departure. Multiple outlets highlighted Perkins and Crawford's decades long careers at Wizards of the Coast. Benjamin Abbott of GamesRadar+ noted that Perkins and Crawford "were heavily involved in the design and direction of D&D during that time, leading the charge for Fourth and Fifth Edition alongside the 2024 revamp. With that in mind, it's a significant coup for Critical Role". Similarly, James Whitbrook of Gizmodo commented that it is "a wild changing of the guard that will see one of the biggest examples of D&D's massive growth over the past decade take on Wizards of the Coast so directly by taking on two of its most prominent contemporary architects". Charles Harte of Game Informer stated while it was "an unexpected move" for these designers, "Darrington Press's pedigree increases significantly" by hiring them. At Gen Con, in July 2025, Darrington Press announced multiple upcoming expansions for Daggerheart which includes a new setting created by Crawford, an adventure supplement created by Perkins and a "new world" created by Keith Baker and Jenn Ellis. Darrington Press also announced an upcoming Kickstarter, scheduled to launch in September 2025, for a Daggerheart play accessory.

== Games ==
Darrington Press games are set both inside and outside of Critical Role's Exandria setting.

Title	Type	Lead designers	Publication	Ref.
Released
Uk'otoa	Semi-cooperative card game	Jeb Havens, Gabriel Hicks	May 27, 2021	
Tal'Dorei Campaign Setting Reborn	Campaign setting book for Exandria (Dungeons & Dragons 5th edition)	Matthew Mercer, Hannah Rose, James Haeck	January 18, 2022	
A Familiar Problem	One-page roleplaying game	Grant Howitt, Marisha Ray	June 25, 2022	
Till The Last Gasp	Two player (PvP) board game	Will Hindmarch, Alex Roberts	March 14, 2023	
Candela Obscura Quickstart Guide	Basic rules for the Candela Obscura setting (Illuminated Worlds system)	Taliesin Jaffe, Chris Lockey, Spenser Starke, Rowan Hall	May 25, 2023	
Queen by Midnight	Battle royale deck-building game	Kyle Shire	August 22, 2023	
Caper Cards: Bell's Hells	Blackjack style card game	Manny Vega	October 10, 2023	
Candela Obscura Core Rulebook	Campaign setting book for Candela Obscura (Illuminated Worlds system)	Spenser Starke, Rowan Hall	November 14, 2023	
For the Queen 2E	Card-based story-building game	Alex Roberts	May 14, 2024	
The Marauders of Windfall	A Daggerheart adventure module released for free as part of the open beta playtest.	Michael R. Underwood, Spenser Starke	May 17, 2024	
Daggerheart	D12 roleplaying game system for long campaigns	Spenser Starke	May 20, 2025	
Solar Gardens	2–5 player tile-drafting board game	Alex Cutler	July 31, 2025	
Upcoming
A Familiar Find	2–4 player card game	Ian Zang	April 7, 2026	
Daggerheart: Hope & Fear	Daggerheart expansion sourcebook	TBA	2026	
Illuminated Worlds	D6 roleplaying game system for short campaigns	Stras Acimovic, Layla Adelman	TBA	

=== Reviews ===
Charles Theel, in his review of Uk'otoa for Polygon, wrote: "The good news is that, as a visually attractive curio, this product makes a great collector's item. The bad news is that the gameplay itself isn't all that much fun. [...] I was hoping for a design that captured some of the feel of friction-heavy board game classics, such as Lifeboats or Survive: Escape From Atlantis, dressed up in the trappings of Exandria. What I got was a Critical Role bauble which can chew up a half hour of time. Sadly, anyone seeking out a truly noteworthy tabletop experience is better off looking elsewhere". However, Tommy Williams of GeekTyrant viewed it as "a fun game" with "very interesting" gameplay; Williams called Uk'otoa "a great start to Darrington Press’ library". Theel, Williams and Jonathon Dornbush of IGN all commended the visual design of the game with Dornbush stating, "the card and box art offers a beautiful interpretation of the titular serpent and the nautical setting, the deck tiles offer a solid base that conveys a bit of the worn nature the ship is probably in, and the meeples, as mentioned before, offer a bespoke, adorable terror that suits the scene. And the game's centerpiece, the Uk'otoa mini, is impressively detailed".

Tal'Dorei Campaign Setting Reborn was the Gold Winner for the 2022 ENNIE Awards in the "Best Setting" category. Chris King, for Polygon, called the sourcebook "The Silmarillion of campaign settings" and commented that the Tal'Dorei Campaign Setting Reborn is over 150 pages longer than the original edition; it includes updates to various factions in the world along with new threats and organizations. King concluded that "despite not being a truly system agnostic book, this is an incredibly well-realized world filled to the brim with interesting characters and stories to tell. Even if it just ends up sitting on your coffee table to peruse during regular Thursday-night livestreams, Tal’Dorei Campaign Setting Reborn is well worth the $49.99 price tag". Benjamin Abbott, for GamesRadar+, commented that "Tal'Dorei Reborn reminds me of the lavish, encyclopaedic companion books for franchises like Lord of the Rings and Star Wars that I used to obsess over as a kid". He wrote that the book is worth purchasing — "even if you're not a huge fan of Critical Role, it'll impress with its skillful worldbuilding and overall design-quality. Indeed, it's rather lavish and looks fantastic. Sure, I enjoyed our last look at the world of Exandria in Explorer's Guide to Wildemount. But this is a step up in many ways, and I'm eager to dig in more".

A Familiar Problem, written by Grant Howitt and Marisha Ray, was included in Polygon's "Free RPG Day" roundup. Charlie Hall, for Polygon, wrote: "now that I've had a chance to get a look at it I'm really impressed. It has all the charm I've come to expect of the crew of actual play stars, and all the randomness and open-ended design that Howitt's work is known for. It's the perfect ice breaker for an event like Free RPG Day, or perhaps for your next regular at-home game".

Theel, in his review of Till The Last Gasp for Polygon, wrote that the game "bleeds potential. This is a singular design which offers a structured yet story-oriented tabletop experience that pulls from traditional board games as well as indie RPGs. [...] After the misstep of Uk'otoa, I'm frankly shocked at how effective and moving this game manages to be". Linda Codega of Io9 stated that the game "is a well-designed, tightly focused two-person game that is a love letter to the most dramatic of showdowns across media. [...] Till the Last Gasp's greatest strength and greatest weakness is that it is exactly what you make it". They highlighted that "although the mechanics are what move the story forward, arguably the roleplaying is the far more important part of the game, even as it has no traditional mechanical value. And when Till the Last Gasp is played in earnest, it is a lively, low-pressure game that allows for immediate investment and clear resolutions". Andrew Stretch, for TechRaptor, viewed it as both a "completely unique game" and "a fantastic game of short-form collaborative roleplay". However, James van Tonningen of Gaming Trend viewed it as "an empty shell of a game" that "fundamentally misunderstands why people enjoy roleplaying games". van Tonningen wrote that "what Till the Last Gasp has done is make a fighting game with no way to track damage done, a combat simulator where both players pause and soliloquise their intentions, and a roleplaying game where the dice are rolled, but have no impact. It’s a drama school assignment masquerading as a high-stakes duel".

In a review of For the Queen 2E, Jenny Melzer of CBR commented that "One thing that Critical Role and Darrington Press have always done well is work within the gaming community. Their respect for creators, including game designers and artists, shines through in this game, just as it has with each of the others they've produced since their founding in 2020". Melzer highlighted that "partnering with Darrington Press gives the game stunning new visuals, more question cards, and all new packaging that makes it perfect for grab-and-go games".

== Awards and nominations ==
Darrington Press products have won or been nominated for tabletop awards, such as the Tal'Dorei Campaign Setting Reborn sourcebook winning the 2022 ENNIE for "Best Setting Gold Award" and the Daggerheart game system receiving multiple ENNIE nominations in 2026. Additionally, the company has won or been nominated for the following awards:

Year	Award	Category	Recipient	Result	Ref.
2022	ENNIE Awards	Fan Award for Best Publisher	Darrington Press	Won	
2026	ENNIE Awards	Best Streaming Content	Get Your Sheet Together (Darrington Press)	Pending	
