= Slayers (role-playing game) =

2020 tabletop role-playing game

- Designers: Spencer Campbell
- Illustrators: Mike Rieman (illustration & graphic design)
- Writers: Spencer Campbell (lead writer), Banana Chan (guest writer), Nevyn Holmes (guest writer)
- Publication: 2020
- Genres: Tabletop role-playing game, fantasy
- Website: https://gilarpgs.itch.io/slayers

Slayers is a 2020 tabletop role-playing game by Spencer Campbell about monster-hunting in a cursed city. It won an Indie Game Developer Network award and was nominated for three ENNIE Awards.

== Publication history ==
Slayers was published in 2020 after a Kickstarter campaign raised $17,507. The supplement Slayers Almanac was published in 2022 after a Kickstarter campaign raised $10,035.

== Reception ==
Slayers won the 2021 Indie Game Developer Network Award for "Best Rules." It was nominated for three 2021 ENNIE Awards: "Best Game," "Best Rules," and "Product of the Year."

Aidan Lambourne for Destructoid listed Slayers as one of the ten greatest tabletop role-playing game systems to build epic adventures, writing that the game "allows the GM extreme freedom" and generates "dynamic and unique encounters." Declan Lowthian for Comic Book Resources listed it as one of the top ten TTRPGs for fantasy fans, writing that, "One of the most interesting aspects of Slayers is how it uses different dice mechanics for different classes." Chase Carter for Polygon listed Slayers as an honorable mention for the best indie tabletop RPGs of 2021.
