= Fall of Magic =

Tabletop fantasy role-playing game

- The first section of the map scroll with tokens, a d6 die, prompt cards and a pamphlet.
- Designers: Ross Cowman
- Illustrators: Taylor Dow, Doug Keith
- Publishers: Heart of the Deernicorn
- Publication: 2015
- Genres: Fantasy
- Players: 2–4
- Chance: Low
- Skills: Role-playing, storytelling, improvisation
- Website: Fall of Magic

Fall of Magic is a collaborative storytelling tabletop role-playing game by Ross Cowman that is played on a hand-printed canvas map. The story follows a dying magus and companions on their journey to the birthplace of magic. The players utilize the map to track game progression as they unroll it. Fall of Magic is an entirely creator-produced indie role-playing game.

== Gameplay ==
It is a storytelling game with no gamemaster and can be run with two to four players. The players are companions of the magus who is dying because magic is dying. The game focuses on their journey to Umbra, the origin of magic. The 5.5 foot double-sided canvas map begins as a scroll that players gradually unroll and flip over to reveal locations and attached story prompts as the game progresses. Metal coins represent the players, who take turns adding to the story by responding to vague yet imaginative prompts.

== Publication history ==
Fall of Magic was created by Ross Cowman who spent over two years playtesting it at gaming conventions before launching a Kickstarter in 2015 to fund the creation of the game. The crowdfunding campaign surpassed the goal of $19,500 and raised just over $75,000 with the support of nearly 1000 backers – Polygon called the campaign "hugely successful". Cowman acknowledged that there was more demand than expected which required "a scalable solution" as the original printer, Cowman's friend Mark Malsbury, was "overwhelmed". While Malsbury produced the original English edition of the game, Cowman ended up opening "a small screenprinting shop in Olympia, Washington, as a sideline to his game distribution company, Heart of the Deernicorn," and purchased a "Riley Hopkins screenprinting machine and some sergers". In the following two years, Cowman's screenprinting shop updated the manufacturing process to streamline the process of creating the game's map.

== Reception ==
Tasha Robinson, for Polygon, stated that the game had become her "obsession" and that her "gaming crew has been playing one continuous campaign for nearly three years. Over the course of more than 60 game sessions, we've spun out a sprawling shared narrative that at this point has involved close to 100 characters". Both Robinson and James Whitbrook of Gizmodo praised the cloth scroll map. Whitbrook called Fall of Magic an "esoteric collaborative storytelling game" which "makes for an incredible social experience simply by how much of it is driven by what you and your fellow travelers put into it".

Fall of Magic was on GeekDad's "The Best Kickstarter Tabletop Games of 2015" list — the article highlights that the game is for all-ages, is re-playable, and is sustained by the players' creativity. In a follow-up review of the game, Will James of GeekDad stated that the game "surpassed all of my expectations for what the final game would be" with "absolutely gorgeous" components such as the "heavy-duty" scroll with "perfect" screen-printing. James also highlighted the two new additions, the Deepway and the Lost Islands, to the game from the version he play tested during the Kickstarter; he wrote that the additions "expand replayability even more while also adding some random unexpectedness to the game" and are "well executed" additions to the original game.

Hilary McNaughton, for the board game review website Shut Up & Sit Down, highlighted that the "overall design of the digital materials" in the Roll20 edition "provided an amazing backdrop for the game". McNaughton reiterated the collaborative nature of the game throughout her review and commented that "this is a storytelling game much more so than a roleplaying game". She stated that "any table of people approaching the game with curiosity, openness to each other's ideas, a spirit of collaboration, and taking the game's recommendations on incorporating the senses and concrete details to heart, will be able to tell a wonderful story together".

Josiah Harrist, for Kill Screen, highlighted that Fall of Magic is centered on the scroll and "the tactile experience of unfurling the world"; he called the game a "strange beast" since "it lacks mechanical structure, yet is confined to its own rigid narrative". Harrist highlighted how this is the "RPG for dreamers" compared to traditional role-playing games, such as Dungeons & Dragons, with different motivations of play. He stated that "a good game of Fall of Magic entails players getting exactly what they want, and deciding as a group what makes a good story. The game engine enables players who aren't 'storytellers' to tell a good story".

=== Awards and nominations ===
| Year | Award | Category | Result | Ref. |
|---|---|---|---|---|
| 2015 | Indie RPG Awards | Best Production | Won | |
| 2015 | Indie RPG Awards | Most Innovative Game | Won | |
| 2016 | Indie Game Developer Network | Best Art | Won | |
| 2016 | Diana Jones Award | | Nominated | |
