= Jonaya Kemper =

American game designer and academic

- Occupations: Game designer/writer and academic
- Employer(s): University of California, Santa Cruz, Carnegie Mellon University
- Known for: LARP theory of emancipatory bleed
- Notable work: Thirsty Sword Lesbians co-writer
- Awards: Nebula Award, ENNIE Awards

Jonaya Kemper is an American game design academic and game writer/designer. Kemper's work includes LARP, tabletop role-playing games, and computer games. Kemper coined the term and developed the theory of "emancipatory bleed."

== Academic work in games ==
Kemper developed the theory of emancipatory bleed in live-action games as a way of analyzing how players with marginalized identities can achieve political liberation through embodying imaginary characters. Emancipatory bleed includes Kemper's concept of "navigational play." Kim Eggleston for Vox Media summarized navigational play as, "using games to imagine yourself differently, in a way that might feel safer than in your real life." Kemper also developed guidelines to design games for players with intersectional identities and an auto-ethnographic process for LARP research and documentation.

In 2025, Kemper became assistant professor of Performance, Play & Design and Creative Technologies at UC Santa Cruz. As Game Design Lead in Carnegie Mellon's computer science department's Human-Computer Interaction Institute, Kemper conducted professional research on human-robot interactions in educational games and racial and gender biases in the design of children's games.

== Game writing and design ==
Kemper co-wrote Thirsty Sword Lesbians (Evil Hat Productions), winning a Nebula Award for Best Game Writing and ENNIE Awards for "Best Game" and "Product of the Year." Kemper wrote a game based on Bram Stoker's Dracula novel called Feeding Lucy in the LARP anthology Honey & Hot Wax (Pelgrane Press). Kemper wrote Tales from the Corner Coven, a short tabletop role-playing game about bodega cats in Brooklyn, for Simon & Schuster's The Ultimate Micro-RPG Book. Kelly Knox for Nerdist called Tales from the Corner Coven "bewitching" and said, "We want to play right meow."

Kemper also wrote the adventure "The Little Mx. Scare-All Pageant" for Visigoths vs. Mall Goths by Lucian Kahn and contributed writing to 7th Sea.
