= Harlem Unbound =

Tabletop horror role-playing game

- Cover art by Brennan Reece; Winner, 2018 ENnie Award, Best Cover Art
- Designers: Chris Spivey
- Publishers: Darker Hue Studios, Chaosium
- Publication: 2017, 2020
- Genres: Horror
- Systems: 1st Edition: Basic Role-Playing, Gumshoe System; 2nd Edition: Basic Role-Playing

Harlem Unbound is a supplement published by indie role-playing game publisher Darker Hue Studios in 2017 for the horror role-playing game Call of Cthulhu published by Chaosium, itself based on the horror stories of H.P. Lovecraft. Harlem Unbound is set during the Harlem Renaissance, where player characters are African American investigators who fight against both cosmic horrors and social inequality.

== Description ==
As RPG historian Stu Horvath noted, "H.P. Lovecraft was a virulent racist, and his views on race permeate many of his most famous and influential stories." Harlem Unbound moves the Call of Cthulhu game from the traditional Lovecraft Country setting of white Massachusetts to black Harlem of the 1920s, "a hotbed of creativity and Black prosperity." Players create characters within that community — assumed to be black — who are wealthy enough to be Investigators, but they will still have to contend with systemic racism as well as the Cthulhu Mythos. Harlem Unbound exposes and subverts the racism of the Lovecraft stories.

Several appendices give further content, including examples of Harlem Slang; a bibliography; examples of literary, musical, and artistic works from the period; and a timeline of events in Harlem from 1919 to 1940.

The book includes eight pages of potential story hooks, as well as four adventures:

- "Harlem Hellfighters Never Die": During a party, a raid by Ku Klux Klan members triggers a shootout with two World War I veterans, who subsequently disappear. The Investigators discover there are ramifications going back to the war.
- "Harlem (K)Nights": When a journalist investigating a surge in gang violence disappears, the Investigators find themselves caught up in the neighborhood's criminal intrigues.
- "The Contender: A Love Story": The boss of the Cotton Club hires the Investigators to find evidence of cheating after a match in which a returning Italian boxer beats, to the point of death, a talented and much stronger young boxer.
- "Dreams and Broken Wings": After an artist disappears, his face appears on a canvas he had given to his sister the previous year.

The first edition (2017) uses rulesets from both Basic Role Playing (BRP) and Gumshoe; in the second edition (2020), only the BRP rules are used. The second edition also contains a crash course on addressing race issues.

2nd edition, 2020 Cover art by Brennan Reece

== Publication history ==
Chaosium published the horror role-playing game Call of Cthulhu in 1981, and as the game underwent several revisions and editions, Chaosium tried to address the inherent racism of Lovecraft's stories. But, as critic Matthew Goult noted, "the problem with Lovecraft is that the latent themes of xenophobia are inescapable in his work. Many of his stories, including Call of Cthulhu, include thinly veiled references to cultures and people Lovecraft found alien and objectionable." African American game designer Chris Spivey wanted to address that inherent racism, but from within the game itself. In 2016 Spivey used Kickstarter to crowdsource enough money to create Harlem Unbound. It was subsequently published under license by indie publisher Darker Hue Studios in 2017 as a 272-page hardcover book designed by Spivey, Bob Geist, Sarah Hood, Alex Mayo, Neall Raemon Price, Brennen Reece, and Ruth Tillman, with cover art by Brennen Reece, and interior art by Reece, Philip Jean Pierre, Nino Malong, and Alex Mayo.

An expanded second edition was published by Chaosium in 2020, with content provided by Spivey, Ariel Celeste, Steffie de Vaan, Bob Geis, Cameron Hays, Sarah E. Hood, Noah Lloyd, Mike Mason, Alex Mayo, and Neall Raemonn Price, with cover art by artwork by Brennen Reece, and interior art by Michal E. Cross, Alex Mayo, and Jabari Weathers.

== Reception ==
Writing for Forbes, Rob Wieland noted, "Not only does the book offer an excellent history of Harlem, how the Renaissance came to be and what caused its downfall, it also offers thoughtful discussion of the racism of the era and different ways in how to address the issue."

On the website Gnome Stew, John Arcadian had an issue with character creation, noting that both the BRP and Gumshoe systems were intermingled, meaning that "determining how to untangle the two in that section was a bit harder and took more time." Arcadian was impressed by the Harlem background, saying, "as a historical fiction game, it is phenomenally well researched and presented." But Arcadian was as equally impressed with the supernatural content, writing, "As a mythos game, it is beautiful and strange in its rendition. Wrapping in the pre-human history of the area as underwater and home to the creatures of strange aeons, Harlem Unbound builds a beautiful tapestry of what came before and how it affects what is there now." Arcadian warned that the game attacked racism head-on, pointing out, "in our gaming culture as it currently is, there is going to be some discomfort running a game like this, or even talking about this game ... That alone, divorced from the excellent setting and game, makes this book worthwhile for every gamer to read." Arcadian concluded, "It often feels like three intricately interwoven works that form a beautiful tapestry of 1920s Harlem and what lies beneath ... Each of these three parts supports each other and brings a unique perspective to the table."

Writing on the Gnome Stew website two years later, Jared Rascher's only complaint about the second edition was the absence of the Gumshoe rules. Otherwise, he concluded, "This product is engaging, conveys important real world history and context, provides a deeper discussion of an important topic in gaming and how individual groups can engage with that topic. It also provides a solid, user friendly setting for the game, presenting the setting in a format that is easy to parse, and provides strong and engaging scenarios to run ... This product is exceptional, and may contain content that would interest you even if the game or genre covered is outside of your normal interests."

In his 2023 book Monsters, Aliens, and Holes in the Ground, RPG historian Stu Horvath noted, "Harlem Unbound is one of the best setting books I've encountered in recent years; it's rich in historical detail, extremely readable, and it's popping with ideas. But, its treatment of race feels Important, especially as more players from diverse backgrounds find their way into the hobby." Horvath concluded, "Harlem Unbound's chapter on storytelling, which provides guidance on these matters of race and more, both in the game and around the table, should be required reading for everyone running an RPG."

== Awards ==
- 2018 ENnie Awards: Harlem Unbound received three Gold Medals for "Best Writing," "Best Setting," and "Best Art: Cover". It was also a finalist in the categories "Best Rules" and "Product of the Year.""
- 2018 Indie Game Developer Network Awards: Harlem Unbound was a winner in the category "Groundbreaking Supplement" and was also a finalist for "Best Setting."
- 2018 Diana Jones Award: Harlem Unbound was a finalist.
- 2020 ENnie Awards: The second edition was a finalist for "Best Art: Cover."
- 2020 Diana Jones Award: The award was dedicated to "Black Excellence in Gaming" and was awarded to more than two dozen black professionals including Chris Spivey.

== Other recognition ==
A copy of Harlem Unbound, a gift of Chris Spivey, is held in the collection of the Smithsonian Museum (Item Number NX512.3.N5 S65 2017).
