= Sharang Biswas =

Indian American game designer and writer

- Occupations: Game designer/writer, interactive media artist, fiction writer, journalist, and academic
- Employer(s): NYU Game Center, Fordham University, Museum of the Moving Image
- Notable work: Feast, Avatar Legends co-writer
- Awards: ENNIE Awards, IndieCade, Indie Game Developer Network

Sharang Biswas is an Indian American designer/writer of tabletop role-playing games and interactive media, a writer of speculative fiction, an adjunct professor of game studies at NYU Game Center, and a freelance games journalist. His work focuses on LGBTQ and science fiction and fantasy themes. Biswas has won multiple awards for his game writing work as both a solo designer and a collaborator: one IndieCade Award, four ENNIE Awards, and two Indie Game Developer Network awards. He was an Artist in Residence at the Museum of the Moving Image.

== Games and interactive media design ==
Biswas designed Feast, a game that takes place during a meal and uses eating as a game mechanic. Feast was featured in an exhibition at the Institute of Contemporary Art, Philadelphia. Feast won the 2017 IndieCade "Dark Horse" award and the 2020 "Most Innovative" Indie Game Developer Network Award.

Biswas has won four ENNIE Awards for game writing: the 2024 Silver for "Best RPG Related Product" for KOBOLD Guide to Roleplaying, the 2023 Gold for "Best Family Game/Product" and "Best Rules" for Avatar Legends: The Roleplaying Game, and the 2023 Judges' Spotlight Award for Moonlight on Roseville Beach: A Queer Game of Disco and Cosmic Horror. In addition to Feast, Biswas won the 2019 Indie Game Developer Network "Most Innovative" award for Verdure. An Elegy for the Hive Witches from The Gauntlet's Codex Zine was also nominated for the IGDN "Most Innovative Award," in 2020. Biswas' game Hex Ed appeared in the anthology You and I: Roleplaying Games for Two, which was nominated for an IGDN "Most Innovative Award" in 2019.

In 2020, Biswas co-designed a LARP adaptation of The Dark Crystal: Age of Resistance for the Museum of the Moving Image, using puppets and other props from the museum's exhibit of the show's character design. In 2021, Biswas became an Artist in Residence at the Museum of the Moving Image. He has continued to produce interactive installations for the museum.

Biswas was co-editor with Lucian Kahn for the Pelgrane Press LARP anthology Honey & Hot Wax in 2020, which was nominated for an IndieCade award and an Indie Game Developer Network award for "Game of the Year." Biswas contributed a game to the anthology called "The Echo of the Unsaid" about sexual tension between heterosexual male college roommates.

Biswas co-edited Strange Lusts, an online anthology of interactive fiction about sex and sexuality, which was published in 2021 by Strange Horizons. He wrote Absolution in Brass: A Game of Guilty Steampunk Zombie-Cyborgs for Simon & Schuster's The Ultimate Micro-RPG Book. He wrote an adventure in Shadow of Operations, the official one-shots book for Grant Howitt's game Spire. He wrote the adventure "Who Says Witches Don't Like Chinese Food?" for the Jiangshi: Blood in the Banquet Hall scenarios book. He was on the writing teams for Tanya DePass's game Into the Motherlands and Green Ronin Publishing's Cthulhu Awakens.

== Speculative fiction ==
Biswas' speculative fiction has been featured in Fantasy Magazine, Lightspeed (magazine), Nightmare Magazine, and Strange Horizons. Charles Payseur for Locus reviewed Biswas' short story "Season of Weddings", which was published in Lightspeed: "Biswas keeps the tone and feel of the story flirty and fun, and painting an interesting picture of a shared and expansive collection of pantheons all interacting, being messy, and, for all their immortality, very human. It’s delightful!" Paula Guran for Locus reviewed Biswas' story "Waiting for Jonah", which was published in Nightmare Magazine: "it’s a good story that employs an unusual use of some equally unusual fairies."

In 2025, The Iron Below Remembers was published, Biswas' novella reimagining the British Isles if South Asian imperial interests had colonized much of the globe instead of European countries. It was a finalist for the 2026 Ignyte Award for Outstanding Novella.

== Academia ==
As of September 2024, Biswas is an adjunct faculty member of NYU Game Center. Biswas was a visiting film and media studies professor at Dartmouth College, where he co-organized a collaborative speculative fiction project between authors and Dartmouth science faculty. He has also taught games studies courses at Fordham University.

Biswas wrote the chapter "Sex and Game Design (Part 2): Mechanics and Verbs" in the book Passion and Play: A Guide to Designing Sexual Content in Games by Michelle Clough. He wrote a 2019 article for the University of Waterloo's Games Institute about the use of live action role-playing games for building queer community. He was interviewed about LARP for the academic journal Analog Game Studies.

While working with Tech Kids Unlimited, Biswas collaborated with researchers and autistic students to assess the potential of video game design workshops in empowering autistic youth.

Biswas holds a Master of Professional Studies (M.P.S.) from Interactive Telecommunications Program at New York University Tisch School of the Arts and a B.A. and B.E. in Biotechnology and Biochemical Engineering from Dartmouth College.

== Talks ==
Biswas was a special guest at Flame Con 2024. He was a 2024 guest of honor at Ropecon. He gave a talk at the 2024 Brooklyn Book Festival about games adapted from literature. He gave a talk at the Game Developers Conference about portrayals of sex in video games. He spoke on the game designer panel "Playing with Identity: Tabletop Role-Playing Games and the Queer Power Self-Definition" at Flame Con 2019, discussing the impacts of queer identity on game design and play.

== Journalism ==
Biswas also works in games journalism. Biswas has been a frequent contributor to Eurogamer. He has also written articles for Kill Screen and Dicebreaker. He was a judge for the 2022 Dicebreaker Tabletop Awards.

== Personal life ==
Biswas grew up in Abu Dhabi and originally emigrated to the United States to study bioengineering at Dartmouth College. He discovered game design while taking a "fun class" with the designer and games researcher Mary Flanagan to offset his engineering prerequisites. Biswas is gay.

== Works ==
Game Writing/Design Credits

Title	Publisher	Credits	Date	Ref.
Cthulhu Awakens	Green Ronin Publishing	Writer	2024	
KOBOLD Guide to Roleplaying	Kobold Press	Author	2023	
Avatar Legends: The Roleplaying Game	Magpie Games	Writer	2022	
Moonlight on Roseville Beach: A Queer Game of Disco and Cosmic Horror	R. Rook Studio	Writer	2022	
Strange Lusts	Strange Horizons	Co-Editor, Writer	2021	
Jiangshi: Blood in the Banquet Hall	Game and a Curry / Wet Ink Games	Scenario Writer	2021	
Honey & Hot Wax (game: The Echo of the Unsaid)	Pelgrane Press	Co-Editor, Writer/Designer	2020	
The Dark Crystal: Age of Resistance LARP at Museum of the Moving Image	Museum of the Moving Image	Co-Designer	2020	
The Ultimate Micro-RPG Book (game: Absolution in Brass: A Game of Guilty Steampunk Zombie-Cyborgs)	Simon & Schuster	Writer/Designer	2020	
Shadow of Operations	Rowan, Rook, and Decard	Adventure Writer	2020	
An Elegy for the Hive Witches	The Gauntlet (tabletop games producer)	Solo Writer/Designer	2019	
A Shroud for the Seneschal	The Gauntlet	Solo Writer/Designer	2019	
Verdure	self-published	Solo Writer/Designer	2018	
Hex Ed (in You & I: Roleplaying Games for Two)	Ginger Goat Publishing	Writer/Designer	2018	
Feast	self-published	Solo Writer/Designer	2017	
Mad Science Foundation	Cryptozoic Entertainment	Co-Designer	2015	
