= Companions' Tale =

2019 tabletop role-playing game

- Designers: Laura Simpson
- Publication: 2019
- Genres: Tabletop role-playing game
- Players: 2-8

Companions' Tale is a 2019 tabletop role-playing game by Laura Simpson about the unreliable and contradictory tales of a hero's many companions. Throughout the game, players collaborate on drawing a shared map. Companions' Tale won "Game of the Year" at the 2020 Indie Game Developer Network awards and was nominated for two 2019 ENNIE Awards.

== Reception ==
=== Awards and nominations ===
Companions' Tale won "Game of the Year" at the 2020 Indie Game Developer Network awards. It was nominated for two 2019 ENNIE Awards: "Product of the Year" and "Best Game." The 2020 Diana Jones Award, which was given to "Black Excellence in Gaming," included Laura Simpson's work on Companions' Tale under honorees.

=== Reviews ===
Jessica Spears for the American Library Association recommended Companions' Tale as a game to play for Black History Month, writing that "Taking on multiple roles, exploring varied points of view, and sharing in the story building process makes for a fantastically engaging gaming experience." Jayme Boucher for Roll20 recommended Companions' Tale as one of ten games to play with kids and praised the game's "evocative world-building rules" and "deck of inspirational themes and art."

=== Scholarship ===
Greg Loring-Albright for Drexel University cites Companions' Tale as an example of a tabletop role-playing game played via user-created online adaptations during the COVID-19 pandemic.
