= Lucian Kahn =

American game designer and musician

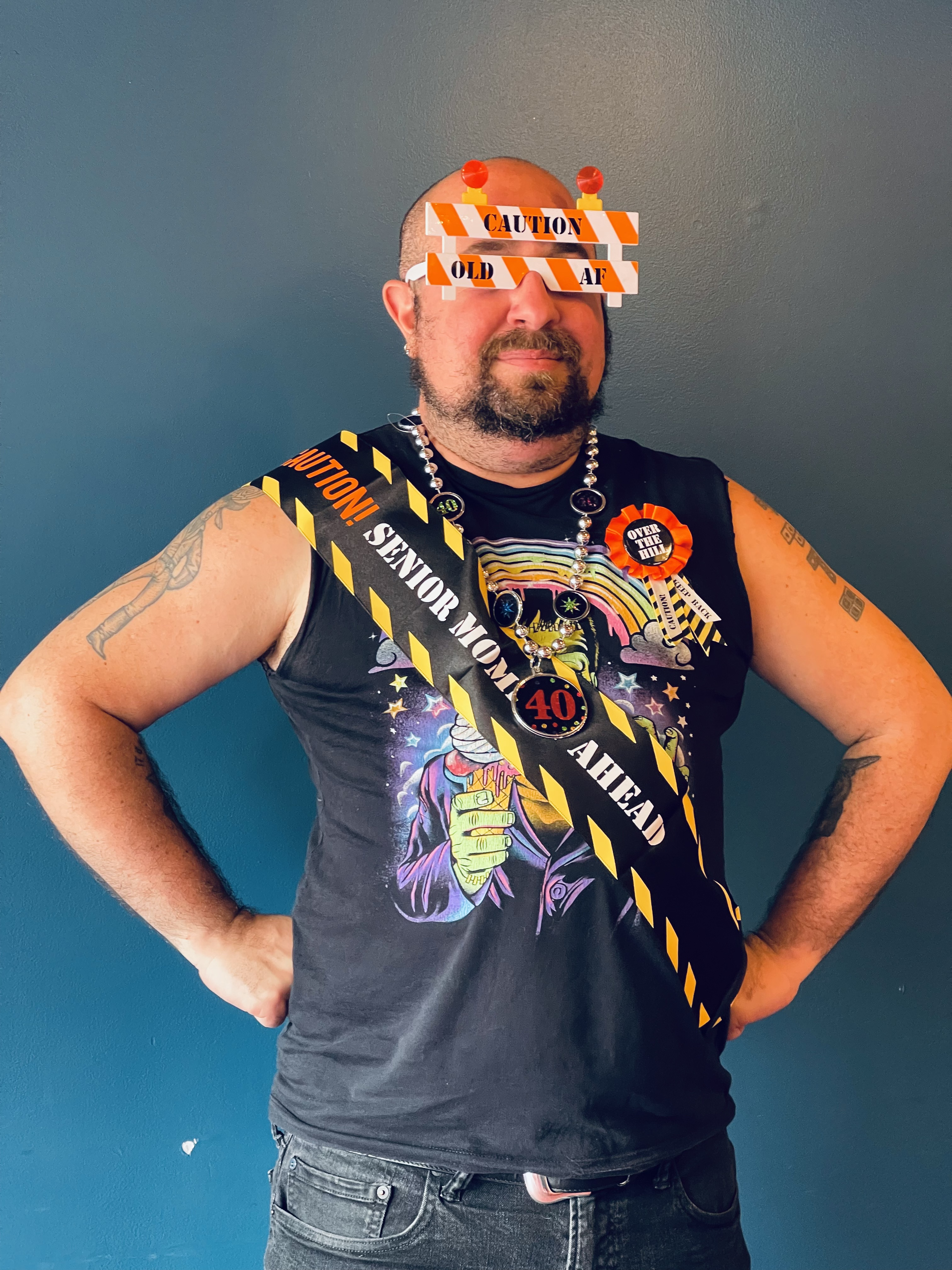
- Lucian Kahn
- Occupations: Game designer, musician
- Writing career
- Genres: Games: indie role-playing games, tabletop role-playing games; music: queercore folk-punk
- Notable works: games: Visigoths vs. Mall Goths, Dead Friend, If I Were a Lich, Man; music: Schmekel

Lucian Kahn is an American role-playing game writer/designer and musician based in Brooklyn. His work focuses on LGBT, Jewish, and subcultural themes, typically utilizing satire and farce. His games include Visigoths vs. Mall Goths, If I Were a Lich, Man, and Dead Friend: A Game of Necromancy, and his music includes Schmekel.

== Games ==
Kahn wrote and designed the tabletop role-playing games Visigoths vs. Mall Goths, Dead Friend: A Game of Necromancy, and the boxed trilogy If I Were a Lich, Man. All three games started out self-published as indie role-playing games, then were reprinted by Hit Point Press in 2023 after the Canadian publisher's kickstarter campaign for If I Were a Lich, Man raised $84,590 in two weeks.

Visigoths vs. Mall Goths lets players play LGBTQ people in 1990s goth subculture with a focus on bisexual people, and uses both classic RPG battle mechanics and dating sim game mechanics about flirting at the mall. The art is by Los Angeles artist Robin Eisenberg, and the game includes an adventure written by Jonaya Kemper.

In Dead Friend: A Game of Necromancy, two players act out a ritual in which one resurrects the other from the dead. Players draw Tarot cards to receive randomized storytelling prompts. Jess Kung for Polygon named Dead Friend the best game they played in 2022. Alex Roberts interviewed Kahn about designing Dead Friend as an episode of Backstory on One Shot Podcast Network.

If I Were a Lich, Man and Kahn's thoughts about Jewish fantasy tropes were featured in a 2023 Jewish Telegraphic Agency article. The trilogy's title game is about anti-fascist Jewish liches debating how to survive attack by paladins who represent white supremacy and Christian privilege in the United States. Kahn "sees Jewish-coded monsters, and queer-coded villains, as figures of resistance" and sees his work as similar to tricksters fighting evil monarchs in Jewish folklore. The game reappropriates antisemitic tropes such as the use of tefillin as phylacteries to store a lich's soul. The second game in the trilogy, Same Bat Time, Same Bat Mitzvah, is about a guest who turns into a vampire at a Bat Mitzvah. In the third game, Grandma's Drinking Song, players collectively write a drinking song while acting out scenes based on Kahn's ancestors' true stories about working as bootleggers during Prohibition in New York City. The trilogy was inspired by What We Do in the Shadows and Russian Doll.

During the COVID-19 pandemic, Kahn produced Hibernation Games, a collection of one-player journaling games by five designers including Anna Anthropy and Jeeyon Shim, with themes of winter and solitude.

Awards and Museum Exhibitions

If I Were a Lich, Man won the Silver ENNIE Award for "Best Family Game / Product" in 2024 and the Indie Game Developer Network award for "Most Innovative" in 2020. Visigoths vs. Mall Goths was part of the exhibition "Game Play: Between Fantasy and Realism" at the Museum of the Moving Image. Kahn's work was also nominated for a 2023 Origins Award, a 2020 IndieCade award, a 2020 ENNIE Award, and 4 additional IGDN awards.

Talks

Kahn spoke on the game designer panel "Playing with Identity: Tabletop Role-Playing Games and the Queer Power Self-Definition" at Flame Con 2019, discussing the impacts of queer identity on game design and play.

== Music ==
In the early 2010s, Kahn was the singer, songwriter and electric guitar player for the Brooklyn queercore punk band Schmekel, which explored his identity as a gay, Jewish, trans man through comedy. Hugh Ryan for The New York Times compared Kahn's songwriting to gay punk band Pansy Division and Jewish singer/songwriter and satirist Tom Lehrer. According to the Jewish Music Research Centre at Hebrew University of Jerusalem, Kahn wrote the lyrics and punk chord progressions on the guitar for songs like "I'm Sorry, It's Yom Kippur," then electronic keyboard player Ricky Riot altered the chord progressions to make them sound cantorial. Eddy Portnoy wrote that Schmekel was an unsurprising development in Jewish culture because there was evidence of transgender people in the shtetls of early 20th century Europe, and connected the band to "Queer Yiddishkeit." In describing his performances with Schmekel, Kahn said, "Comedy is sacred to me, which is a pretty Jewish sentiment, isn't it?"

Kahn appears as the lead singer of Schmekel in the Tales of the City novel The Days of Anna Madrigal by Armistead Maupin.
