= Robin Eisenberg =

American illustrator and designer

Robin Eisenberg is an American illustrator and designer based in Los Angeles. Her most notable works include collaborations with Thrasher, Vans and Urban Decay, which popularized her graphic, technicolor style. She has since launched a shop where she sells clothing, phone cases, tote bags, and prints of her artwork.

== Early life and education ==
Robin Eisenberg grew up in Eagle Rock and Glendale, California. Her parents divorced when she was two years old, though she describes her childhood as being full of "creative and personal validation" in spite of any difficulties.

In high school, she played piano, for which she received a music scholarship to attend San Diego State University. She regularly skipped classes to draw, and eventually she lost her music scholarship. She went on to study English, and later earned her degree.

== Career ==
Inspired by her mother's college career as an artist, Eisenberg has been drawing since childhood. Despite this lifelong hobby, Eisenberg did not pursue art as a profession until 2010. She started by designing album covers for several bands while on tour with a band called Crocodiles as their keyboard player. During this time, she lived in Berlin on an artist visa.

As the volume of work creating band posters and album covers increased, Eisenberg stopped touring and returned to Los Angeles to become a full-time artist. In 2014, she started her own business making enamel pins and patches.

Quickly integrating into the "pin community" of social media, Eisenberg became a member of the Girl Pin Gang, an invite-only collective of the female and gender-queer pin and patch makers. The group hosts art shows and pop-up markets to showcase the artwork of their featured designers.

In 2016, Eisenberg published Hey Moon, a collection of her favorite personal illustrations. In 2020, Eisenberg illustrated the cover of Visigoths vs. Mall Goths.

== Primary themes and subjects ==
Critics have described Eisenberg's work as a "cheeky [and] alluring" take on the pop art movement of the 1960s. Characterized by a vivid, neon color palette, her illustrations are most widely known for depicting alien women performing everyday tasks. Her extraterrestrial settings are also heavily inspired by Star Trek and The X-Files.

In an interview with People of Print, Eisenberg described the main subjects of her work as, "space, fashion, feminism, sex, makeup, Star Trek, books, bands, the occult, makeovers, dogs, the beach, [and] also the idea of appreciating the weirdness in beauty and vice versa." She depicts wide variations of women, often quoted as being concerned with representations of female sexuality and celebrating diversity.

== Collaborations ==
=== Thrasher ===
In 2015, Eisenberg posted a drawing of one of her quintessential "alien babes" wearing a Thrasher t-shirt to her Instagram. After some popular rotation on the social media site, Thrasher found the drawing and contacted Eisenberg about a t-shirt collaboration. In the fall of 2016, Eisenberg posted a photo of the finished t-shirt design, depicting two alien women on a motorcycle, driving through an intergalactic desert.

=== Vans ===
In early 2018, Eisenberg collaborated with Vans to design a pair of shoes in support of art education. The shoe company runs an art program called Vans Custom Culture, in which schools design two pairs of shoes to compete for the chance to win $75,000 for their school's art program.

In the spring of 2018, Eisenberg teamed up with Vans on several occasions for their Women in Skateboarding events. In March, she created the art in an instructional skateboarding zine. In May, she visited the House of Vans location in Chicago, where she painted a mural featuring female skateboarders in space.

=== Vevo ===
In April 2018, Eisenberg and Vevo worked together on a video for the hosting service's "The World According To" series. Eisenberg created all the art and animation for "The World According to Hayley Kiyoko," which detailed several key factors in the pop singer and actress's life.
