= Slugblaster =

Tabletop role-playing game

Kickflip Over a Quantum Centipede
- Game of the Year edition cover by Hamburger Hands
- Designers: Mikey Hamm
- Illustrators: SEXONAPIZZA, Galen Pejeau, Susanna Wong, Scott A. Ford, Hallie Finney, Rupam Grimoeuvre, Taylor Reese, Mike Perschon, Hamburger Hands, Mikey Hamm
- Publishers: Wilkie's Candy Lab; Mythworks (Game of the Year Edition)
- Publication: 2021 (original); 2024 (Game of the Year Edition)
- Genres: Science fiction; Coming-of-age

Slugblaster, subtitled Kickflip Over a Quantum Centipede, is an indie tabletop role-playing game created by Mikey Hamm about teenagers who explore other realities and participate in a hoverboards-based skateboarding-like subculture called 'slugblasting' to achieve fame and recognition. Slugblaster rules are based on Blades in the Dark. Slugblaster was published in 2021, and a Game of the Year edition was published by Mythworks in 2024.

== Gameplay ==
When a character in Slugblaster performs an uncertain action, a roll is made using a pool of six-sided (d6) dice and taking the single highest result (with possible outcomes of a success on a 6, mixed success on a 4 or 5, and a failure on 3 or below). Slugblaster has no character attributes or skills, but players can increase their odds of success by spending a resource called boost to add dice to their rolls. Challenges and situations that may take more than one action are represented by progress tracks, which are filled by players' actions based on the outcome of their rolls, and players can spend another resource called kick to fill progress tracks faster.

The gameplay loop of Slugblaster alternates between the characters going on runs (pursuing a particular goal, overcoming obstacles, and being rewarded with prizes) and playing out scenes (often linked into overarching themed arcs) of downtime by choosing beats and spending resources gained on runs (like style and trouble). The runs will often take the characters to other realities beyond mundane Earth, such as the post-apocalyptic wastes of Vastiche or the cyberpunk dimension called Operaeblum. As the campaign progresses, the players will acquire a number of 'doom' and 'legacy' points (representing remarkable negative and positive events throughout their careers, respectively), which are used at the end of the campaign to determine the characters' epilogues in adulthood.

Making a character in Slugblaster involves choosing an 'attitude' playbook (analogous to a class) describing their character's personality and approach to slugblasting (the Guts, the Grit, the Smarts, the Heart, or the Chill) and granting them unique traits, together with one of twelve signature devices (or signatures, such as a suit of powered armor or a robotic companion). Both the attitude and the signature offer the player ways of gaining and spending various amounts of boost and kick, and characters can advance to gain additional traits and upgrade their devices with mods by collecting and spending special components.

The players also create their slugblasting crew together, deciding on where they hang out, what other factions (such as rival slugblasting crews or corporate sponsors) they have positive or negative relationships with, what reputation they have, and what interdimensional portal pathways they start with the knowledge of.

== Publication history ==
Before the game's full release, a free Turbo version was released in 2020, aimed at online, single-session (one-shot) play.

A Kickstarter campaign to publish the original version of the game ran in 2020, which was released a year later. Another crowdfunding campaign to release the game's Game of the Year edition was run by indie publisher Mythworks in 2023, releasing the following year.

In 2025, Mythworks ran a BackerKit campaign to fund Slime, Warp, and Solder, a boxed set containing a trio of themed expansion zines for the game.

== Reception ==
In 2023, Slugblaster was nominated for an ENNIE Award in the Best Game category, and won the Game of the Year award at the 2023 Indie Groundbreaker Awards.

In his 2025 review, Quintin Smith described Slugblaster as "a game sent back in time from a brighter future; it's not just that it's hilarious, it's not just that it's helped me and my friends have big feelings at our table, and it's not just that I think it'll appeal to more kinds of people than most TTRPGs. It's that it achieves all of that by thinking differently - [...] systemically, stylistically, and thematically", and that its gameplay "breaks RPGs out of the shackles that say they all have to be about combat or investigation, or even problem-solving," but was critical of its gamemaster resource mechanics and the large amount of unique rules terminology.
