= Storytelling game =

Type of game

A storytelling game is a game where multiple players collaborate on telling a story. Some games primarily feature spoken storytelling, while others primarily feature collaborative writing. In some storytelling games, such as many tabletop role-playing games, each player represents one or more characters in the developing story. Others involve more third-person narrative.

== Collaborative writing games ==
Collaborative fiction is a form of storytelling which uses collaborative writing as the primary medium. A group of authors share creative control of a story. Exquisite Corpse, a Surrealist parlour game, is an example of a collaborative writing game. The parlour game Consequences is similar.

== Storytelling card games ==
In storytelling card games, players use cards containing narrative prompts or plot details to tell a collaborative story. Examples include Once Upon a Time and For the Queen.

== Tabletop role-playing games ==
Storytelling TTRPGs take various forms. Some require one participant (a gamemaster or narrator) to describe the setting and take supporting character roles, while others distribute this function among multiple players. White Wolf Game Studio's Storyteller System, which is used in World of Darkness role-playing games such as Vampire: The Masquerade, is a well-known TTRPG described as a "storytelling game." These use a narrator. Other storytelling TTRPGs distribute narrative authority equally among all players such as The Quiet Year, Fall of Magic, and Companions' Tale. A keepsake game is a type of TTRPG where the player(s) create a physical keepsake, such as a journal, in response to prompts or other game mechanics over the course of playing the game.

In contrast to improvisational theatre and live action role-playing games, TTRPG players describe the actions of their characters rather than acting them out, except during dialogue or, in some games, monologue.

== History of storytelling TTRPGs ==
Matrix Game (c. 1988) by Chris Engle was an early collaborative storytelling game not based in simulation. In this system, a referee decides the likeliness of the facts proposed by the players, and events happen or not according to a dice roll. Players can propose counter-arguments that are resolved in a dice rolling contest. A conflict round can follow to resolve any inconsistencies or further detail new plot points.

In 1999, game designer Ian Millington's Ergo offered a collaborative role-playing system. It was based on the rules of the Fudge universal role-playing system, but eliminated the need for a gamemaster, distributing the responsibility for the game and story equally among all players and undoing the equivalence between player and character.

The coin system in Universalis (2002) relies less on randomness and more on collaboration between players.

Starting in the mid-00s, storytelling TTRPGs based upon historical events began to emerge in indie role-playing game design communities. Examples include Grey Ranks (2007) by Jason Morningstar, which takes place during the 1944 Warsaw Uprising, and Montsegur 1244 (2008) by Frederik Jensen, in which players tell a collaborative story about the Cathars.
