= Noshir Dalal =

American actor and model (born 1978)

- Born: Noshir Dalal; August 15, 1978 (age 48)
- Occupations: Actor; Voice Actor
- Years active: 1996–present

Noshir Dalal (born August 15, 1978) is an American actor. He is known for his voice acting roles in video games, such as Charles Smith in Red Dead Redemption 2 (2018), Gabriel Diaz in Gears Tactics (2020), Kotallo in Horizon Forbidden West (2022), Bode Akuna in Star Wars Jedi: Survivor (2023) and Jubei in Ghost of Yotei (2025). In television, he had recurring roles as Vice Admiral Rampart in the animated series Star Wars: The Bad Batch and Dr. Rajan Savarimuthu in the actual play web series Candela Obscura.

In 2024, Dalal voiced concerns about the unregulated use of generative AI in video games.

== Personal life ==
Dalal is of Japanese and Parsi descent.

== Selected filmography ==
=== Television ===
Year	Title	Role	Notes
2009	Days of Our Lives	Brian	2 episodes
2010	The Whole Truth	Cop #1	Episode: "True Confessions"
2011	The Mentalist	Second Student	Episode: "Like a Redheaded Stepchild"
2011	The Event	Police Officer #1	Episode: "One Will Live, One Will Die"
2011	Rizzoli & Isles	Police Officer	Episode: "Brown Eyed Girl"
2011	Pair of Kings	Jason Makoola	Episode: "How I Met Your Brother"
2011	CSI:NY	Officer	Episode: "Indelible"
2013	Criminal Minds	Ben Harrison	Episode: "Gatekeeper"
2015–2019	General Hospital	Raj Patel	9 episodes
2021	Yasuke	Mitsuhide (voice)	4 episodes
2019–2022	Love, Death & Robots	Sergeant Pettibone, Officer Soran, Beaumont (voice)	3 episodes
2020–2021	It's Pony	Gerry (voice)	Recurring role
2021	Hit-Monkey	Fat Cobra, Silver Samurai (voice)	6 episodes
2021	Record of Ragnarok	Indra, Brahma (voice)	English version
2021–2024	Star Wars: The Bad Batch	Vice Admiral Rampart, Stormtrooper (voice)	Recurring role
2022	The Owl House	Graye Vernworth (voice)	3 episodes
2022	Star Wars: Tales of the Jedi	Togruta Villager (voice)	Episode: "Life and Death"
2023–2024	Star Wars: Young Jedi Adventures	Pychor Vuundir, Mycho Zala, Ootooan Leader (voice)	4 episodes
2023	Ōoku: The Inner Chambers	Masakatsu Inaba (voice)	Recurring role; English version
2023	Pluto	Persian Father (voice)	
2024	Batman: Caped Crusader	Hospital Guard, Mobster (voice)	Episode: "Savage Night"
2025	Will Trent	Elias Baidwan	Episode: "No Faith in Second Chances"
2026	Free Bert	Glen Darvish	4 episodes

=== Film ===
Year	Title	Role	Notes
2019	Scooby-Doo! and the Curse of the 13th Ghost	Flim Flam	

=== Video games ===
Year	Title	Role	Notes
2015	Call of Duty: Black Ops III	Khalil	
2015	Fallout 4	Knight Rhys	
2016	Gears of War 4	Aspho Point Gear	
2016	Titanfall 2	Militia Soldiers	
2017	LawBreakers	Kintaro	
2018	Red Dead Redemption 2	Charles Smith	Voice and motion capture
2019	Sekiro: Shadows Die Twice	Sekiro / Wolf	English version
2019	Remnant: From the Ashes	Hound Master	
2019	Gears 5	COG Soldier, Nomad	
2019	The Outer Worlds	Udom Bedford	
2019	Death Stranding	MULEs, Charles Khan, Guards, Special Forces Soldier	
2020	League of Legends	Yone	English version
2020	Cyberpunk 2077	Scorpion	Voice and motion capture
2020	Gears Tactics	Gabriel Diaz	
2020	Star Wars: Squadrons	Varko Grey	
2020	Marvel's Spider-Man: Miles Morales	Roxxon Security	
2021	Deathloop	Gideon Fry, Andrei, Eternalists	
2021	Halo Infinite	Jega 'Rdomnai	
2022	Guild Wars 2	Detective Rama	End of Dragons expansion
2022	Star Wars: The Old Republic	Rass Ordo	Legacy of the Sith expansion
2022	Horizon Forbidden West	Kotallo	Voice, motion capture, and likeness
2022	Tactics Ogre: Reborn	Brantyn Morne	
2023	Star Wars Jedi: Survivor	Bode Akuna	Voice, motion capture, and likeness
2023	Mortal Kombat 1	Rain	
2023	Marvel's Spider-Man 2	Quentin Beck / Mysterio	
2024	Flintlock: The Siege of Dawn	Jung	
2025	DC: Dark Legion	Deathstroke	
2025	Ghost of Yotei	Lord Kitamori / Jubei	Voice, motion capture, and likeness

=== Web series ===
Year	Title		Role	Notes
2023	Critical Role	One-shots	Rain	Episode: "Mortal Kombat One-Shot: Sindel vs. The Realms"
2024	Critical Role	Campaign Three	The Emissary	Episode: "Downfall"
2023–2024	Candela Obscura	The Circle of Tide & Bone	Dr. Rajan Savarimuthu	Limited series
