= Tech Kids Unlimited =

American education organization

Tech Unlimited (TU) is an NYC-based not-for-profit 501(c)(3) education organization that teaches computational thinking and technology skills to students with Autism Spectrum Disorder, learning and emotional challenges. The program emphasizes project-based learning along with Universal Design for Learning, explicit instruction, and other adaptations for students who learn differently. The organization was founded by Beth Rosenberg, an NYC-based educator for her son who learns differently.

== Organization and classes ==
TU classes follow a differentiated model of small workshops with high support including a 1:3 teacher-to-student ratio as well as a social worker in every classroom. TU offers year-round programming with the weekend, summer, and after-school programs. The majority of classes operate out of NYU Tandon School of Engineering via The Ability Project, an interdisciplinary lab classroom. Many of the staff are undergraduate students or graduates of the university.

Over the last 40 years, the decline in manufacturing jobs and increase in service jobs, which usually require social interactions, has made employment more challenging for a special needs population that tends to struggle with social etiquette and has had few options outside of low-wage labor jobs. Technology jobs could help fill this gap, tapping into a segment of the potential workforce that is inclined to love and be adept at technology.

== Awards and grants ==
In the summer of 2015, TU participated in the AT&T ConnectAbility Challenge, a competition to help find software solutions to assist those with disabilities. TU submitted LOLA (Laugh Out Loud Aid), an app that provides social and emotional solutions for individuals with ASD and other learning differences through the use of humour, including funny, animated GIFs. LOLA won a total of $12,500 in prize money, taking out the Social/Emotional Solutions category as well as the Popular Choice Award. The app was officially released for free in the iTunes App Store in December 2015. LOLA went on to be featured in an exhibit at the Cooper-Hewitt Museum. In 2016, TU was a recipient of the Google Rise Education Award. In 2020, TU was the recipient of the NBC Universal Foundation's Project Innovation grant.

== Response to COVID-19 ==
During the unprecedented time of the COVID-19 pandemic, TU was able to put all workshops online as of March 13, 2020.
