= For the Queen (game) =

Tabletop role-playing game

- Cover art for the second edition
- Designers: Alex Roberts
- Illustrators: 1st Edition: Stephanie Böhm, Constance Bouckaert, Klaudia Bulantová, Elisa Cella, Lauren Covarrubias, Arlei Dormiendo, Caleb Hosalla, Denise Jones, Shel Kahn, Joyce Maureira, Maegan Penley, Alena Zhukova; 2nd Edition: Arlei Dormiendo, Arthur Riel Cabezas, Brady Evans, Caitlyn Kurilich, Céline Vu, Cheseely Li, Chelsea Ortega, Constance Bouckaert, Denis Freitas, Eleonor Piteira, Esther Tejano, G.C. Houle, Hamahmeyo, Jeong Kim, Kelsey Eng, Lemonjuiceday, LABillustration, Lara Georgia Carson, Lauren Covarrubias, Malia Ewart, Maxine Vee, Nicole Gustafsson, Karina Pavlova, Silly Chaotic, Tasia M S
- Publishers: Evil Hat Productions (1st Edition); Darrington Press (2nd Edition)
- Publication: 2019
- Genres: Tabletop role-playing game; Storytelling game
- Players: 2–6
- Setup time: 10 minutes
- Playing time: 30–120 minutes
- Age range: 13+
- Skills: Role-playing, improvisation
- Materials required: Narrative prompt cards
- Website: https://forthequeengame.com/

For the Queen is a tabletop role-playing game by Alex Roberts about the dangerous journey of a queen's servants. The first edition was published by Evil Hat Productions in 2019, and the second edition was published by Darrington Press in 2024. The game features themes of power, authority, femininity, love, loyalty, and betrayal. For the Queen has inspired indie role-playing games with similar game mechanics.

== Gameplay ==
As a group, the players will choose a queen from the dedicated queen card deck. Players take turns drawing cards from a central deck and respond to textual prompts with spoken narration. Storytelling is collaborative. The game ends when the card with the final prompt is drawn; this prompt asks the players if they will defend their queen as the queen is attacked. Academic Brittany Arde highlighted that For the Queen is similar to The Quiet Year (2013) as it "uses the same loaded questions mechanic, focusing within the bounds of a tight narrative introduction". For the Queen also includes the X-Card safety tool. Arde noted that "three types of uncertainty are prevalent in For the Queen: randomness, player uncertainty and narrative anticipation" and that the game "primes the narrative anticipation through the instruction phase by introducing the player in medias res (a retinue with the Queen) and telling the player how the story will end ('The Queen is under attack'), making the player question how the story will progress from point B to point C".

== Publication history ==
For the Queen was created by Alex Roberts and published by Evil Hat Productions in 2019. It also had a digital edition released on Roll20. Additionally, Roberts released a system reference document for the game under a Creative Commons license which allows "other creators the right to make their own structurally similar RPGs under the label Descended From the Queen".

The game's first edition was discontinued in October 2023. Roberts explained For the Queen was "the last boxed game" released by Evil Hat as the publisher shifted to exclusively releasing books and that originally, the game was "almost on the chopping block" as it was "80% done" when the publisher made their change. She commented that while "there was a lot of love for the game internally" at Evil Hat, "it was just not really in-line with where they put their efforts" and For the Queen was "in a weird section of their website" as it is "kind of a role-playing game, but it's also kind of not"; the game was also not released "broadly" and instead limited to "specialty game shops". Lin Codega of Rascal commented that "while it was never out of stock during its four-year run at Evil Hat, after For the Queen was featured on Shut Up, Sit Down, it became exceptionally hard to find at physical distributors, according to a spokesperson from Evil Hat".

In 2022, Roberts worked on Till the Last Gasp (2023) by Darrington Press and following that, the imprint's marketing manager reached out to Roberts to see if she was interested in working with them again. Roberts suggested a second edition of For the Queen as she was looking for a new publisher. The second edition was then released by Darrington Press in May 2024. With the second edition, Roberts highlighted that it was mostly "about expanding" as she "wanted to write more cards" and "write new prompts" along with clarifying some of the rules. Darrington Press wanted to expand the number of queen card illustrations so the second edition has 25 queen cards. Codega highlighted that For the Queen is the first licensed game Darrington Press has released.

== Reception ==
Emily St. James, for Vox, commented that the game "is an excellent introduction to RPGs because it uses a mechanic almost all of us are already familiar with – drawing cards – in service of the core idea behind RPGs: telling a story together". She highlighted that it is "a game that makes telling a great story feel almost easy". James Austin of Wirecutter called For the Queen "a unique, impressively designed role-playing experience". He noted that the "quick and straightforward structure keeps the pace swift as players build out their characters and develop connections with each other and the queen, moving the collective story forward in a way that feels organic—like swapping stories around a campfire". Lin Codega of Rascal noted that For the Queen was originally released "at the start of the COVID pandemic in late 2019" and became "an incredibly popular game" with "a huge number of derivative Descended From The Queen games that have been developed from its systems reference document".

James D'Amato, for Polygon, rated the first edition of For the Queen as having both low mechanical crunch and low difficulty to pick up and play, noting that "teaching the rules is actually folded into setting it up on the table, which only takes around 10 minutes". D'Amato stated "if you love to explore backstory, play with emotionally charged relationships, and agonize at dramatic crossroads, then For the Queen is the perfect place to branch out". Jenny Melzer of CBR described the second edition of For the Queen as "quick to launch, easy to play, and satisfying to explore", noting that it does not have a "learning curve, as it teaches the rules as players go". Melzer explained that the game does not "require a Game Master" since it is a "collaborative storytelling game" and the simple ruleset does not "take away from how intricate the game itself is" – "because it's fast-paced, however, with most games lasting anywhere from 30 to 90 minutes, it requires players to get creative and think on their feet". Andrew Stretch, reviewing the second edition for TechRaptor, stated that gameplay "was an incredibly refreshing experience. From it's [sic] lack of innate competitivity, to it's [sic] simple setup and premise this is a fun exercise in worldbuilding and introspection that I have yet to experience before". Stretch noted one caveat is that if the player is uninterested in role-playing games then For the Queen will not "move your dial" but players "looking for a fun storytelling game that can be set up in seconds and that can have wildly different outcomes" should grab this game.

Melzer commented that "while there was definitely nothing wrong with the first edition version of For the Queen, partnering with Darrington Press gives the game stunning new visuals, more question cards, and all new packaging that makes it perfect for grab-and-go games". Codega wrote that the publisher "signed an easy mark, drawn from their stable of freelancers – For The Queen is a genuinely great game, and the new art is really, very pretty", noting that if online "buzz" is "any indication, this new edition is very likely going to be extremely popular and will sell very well". Dan Arndt, for The Fandomentals, commented that For the Queen is a "successful storytelling game from 2019" which was "resurrected this year with brand new art and a streamlined ruleset" by publisher Darrington Press. Arndt noted that as a "minimalist game", the "presentation and art is a massive part of the experience" so the second edition benefited from its new publisher since Darrington Press does not "spare any expense when it comes to their releases" and the game cards "are fantastic pieces of individual art that use their tarot-sized tableaux to the max. The huge roster of artists were put to good use designing the Queen cards, each of which is bursting with color and character". Arndt described it as "a lavish release even for its $24.99 price point, from the sturdy magnetized lid that unfolds the cover of the faux-storybook box to the little red ribbon that helps you get the cards out".
