= Candela Obscura =

American actual play web series and tabletop role-playing game

- Title card from Chapter 1: "The Circle of the Vassal & the Veil"
- Genre: Actual play; Horror; Anthology
- Created by: Taliesin Jaffe; Chris Lockey
- Directed by: Steve Failows
- Starring: List: Laura Bailey; Anjali Bhimani; Ashley Johnson; Robbie Daymond; Matthew Mercer; Taliesin Jaffe; Travis Willingham; Zehra Fazal; Marisha Ray; Brennan Lee Mulligan; Luis Carazo; Spenser Starke; Noshir Dalal; Sam Riegel; Gina Darling; Ashly Burch; Liam O'Brien; Aabria Iyengar; Imari Williams; Aimee Carrero; Alexander Ward; Khary Payton
- Composer: Colm McGuinness
- Country of origin: United States
- Original language: English
- No. of seasons: 4
- No. of episodes: 12

Production
- Producers: Steve Failows; Maxwell James
- Camera setup: Multi-camera
- Production company: Critical Role Productions

Original release
- Network: Twitch; YouTube
- Release: May 25, 2023 – present

Candela Obscura is the name of both an American actual play web series and its spinoff tabletop role-playing game system.

The Candela Obscura show is a horror anthology series in which actors play a tabletop role-playing game of the same name. It was created by Taliesin Jaffe and Chris Lockey, directed by Steve Failows and produced by Failows and Maxwell James for Critical Role Productions. It is Critical Role's first series to use a game and a system owned by the company. Over the course of a few episodes, different casts of characters join the secret order Candela Obscura and form a circle to investigate several supernatural phenomena, guided by a Lightkeeper. The chapters of Candela Obscura are mostly conceived as self-contained miniseries, following a different set of characters within the same fictional universe called the Fairelands. It premiered on May 25, 2023, on Twitch and YouTube and is broadcast on the last Thursday of each month at 19:00 PT. The first chapter's video on demand was uploaded to YouTube two weeks after the first broadcast. However, with the second chapter, the VODs are now uploaded to Critical Role's YouTube channel on the Monday after the live stream.

The Candela Obscura game system is based on the Illuminated Worlds system. A quick start guide for Candela Obscura was published to coincide with the start of the show; the core rule book was released on November 14, 2023.

== Series ==
The series takes place in the Fairelands, a coastal valley found in the country of Hale, which is plagued by several types of magical horrors that bleed in the world through thinnings of The Flare, a boundary that separates the different realms that comprise this universe. After a cold wave, named the Shiver, hits the region, Hale is attacked by the Otherwhere, who wish to seize their resources. Following a six-year conflict, Hale ended up winning the war thanks to new military equipment created after the invention of electricity. In 1907, the city of Newfaire is enjoying a period of prosperity, but mysteries that threaten the newfound peace lie under the city, in the ruins of the dead civilization that inhabited Oldfaire. A secret order, Candela Obscura, has dedicated centuries to the study and containment of these phenomena, which are examined by different circles of investigators guided by a Lightkeeper.

Each chapter is standalone from each other and feature different casts. During the first chapter, an inexperienced group of investigators, guided by Lightkeeper O'Neill, form the Circle of the Vassal and the Veil to investigate a new phenomenon in the district of the Steel.

=== Production and format ===
The concept for the game was created by Critical Role cast member Taliesin Jaffe and Chris Lockey, while the series was directed by Steve Failows and produced by Failows and Maxwell James. Development began before the COVID-19 pandemic, but was paused during lockdown. The series is divided in chapters, representing various story arcs guided by different game masters and composed of several episodes, which will each feature a distinct investigation. Chapters one to four are composed of three standalone episodes each. Jaffe, as the Lightkeeper, appears briefly at the start of each episode to provide a prologue.

=== Casting ===
The first chapter stars Jaffe as the Lightkeeper and fellow Critical Role regular cast members Laura Bailey and Ashley Johnson, alongside Anjali Bhimani and Robbie Daymond, who previously appeared on Critical Role's spin-off series Exandria Unlimited. The first chapter is led by Critical Role dungeon master Matthew Mercer as the chapter's game master. Bailey plays as the medium Arlo Black, Bhimani as the magician Charlotte "Charlie" Eaves, Johnson as the criminal August "Auggie" James, and Daymond as the professor Howard Margrove.

The second chapter is led by the Candela Obscura game designer Spenser Starke as the game master. Zehra Fazal joins the cast along with Critical Role regular cast members Marisha Ray, Travis Willingham and Exandria Unlimited: Calamity cast members Brennan Lee Mulligan and Luis Carazo. Carazo plays as the medium Marion Collodi, Fazal as Doctor Jinnah Basar, Mulligan as the soldier Sean Finnerty, Ray as the criminal Beatrix Monroe and Willingham as the journalist Nathaniel Trapp. Jaffe is the only returning cast member from Chapter 1; reprising the Lightkeeper role.

The third chapter is led by Aabria Iyengar as the game master with Noshir Dalal, Sam Riegel, Gina Darling, Ashly Burch and Liam O'Brien as players. Like the previous chapters, Jaffe reprises the Lightkeeper role. Burch plays as Doctor Elsie Roberts, Dalal as Professor Rajan Savarimuthu, Darling as the magician Cordelia Glask, O'Brien as the occultist Cosmo Grimm and Riegel as the soldier Oscar Grimm.

O'Brien returns in the fourth chapter as the game master with Jaffe, Aimee Carrero, Imari Williams, and Alexander Ward as players; Jaffe also reprises the Lightkeeper role.

Starke returns as the game master in the Candela Obscura Live one-shot special, The Circle of the Silver Screen. Mercer, Khary Payton, Bailey and Ray are the players. Jaffe acts as the Master of Ceremonies. O'Brien has a cameo appearance. The cast created their characters and formed their circle in front of the VIP ticket holders ahead of the live show.

=== Broadcast ===
Candela Obscura premiered at 19:00 PT on May 25, 2023, on Critical Role's Twitch and YouTube channels; the series broadcasts on the last Thursday of each month. For the first chapter, the video on demand (VOD) was uploaded two weeks after the episodes' first broadcast. With the second chapter, the VOD schedule was changed to the Monday following. Additionally, the second chapter's premiere was simulcast live in Cinemark Theatres along with the regular Twitch and YouTube livestream on August 31, 2023. The premiere of the second chapter's third episode was delayed one week to accommodate the broadcast of the Critical Role special The Mighty Nein Reunion: Echoes of the Solstice which aired in the Candela Obscura timeslot. The fourth chapter's title, The Circle of the Crimson Mirror, and premiere date of February 29, 2024 was revealed in the last episode of the third chapter. A live show was recorded on May 25, 2024, at The United Theater on Broadway in Los Angeles; the special then premiered on May 30, 2024. The show went on hiatus in June 2024.

=== Episodes ===
==== Chapter 1: "The Circle of the Vassal & the Veil" ====
No. overall	Part	Title	Original release date
1	1	"The Cold Embrace"	May 25, 2023
2	2	"Ravage of Red Lamp"	June 29, 2023
3	3	"The Collectors"	July 27, 2023

==== Chapter 2: "The Circle of Needle & Thread" ====
No. overall	Part	Title	Original release date
4	1	"Eye For An Eye"	August 31, 2023
5	2	"Flesh and Blood"	September 28, 2023
6	3	"Broken Path"	November 2, 2023

==== Chapter 3: "The Circle of Tide & Bone" ====
No. overall	Part	Title	Original release date
7	1	"The Antiquarian"	November 30, 2023
8	2	"The Guardian of Groundswell"	January 4, 2024
9	3	"Candles in the Dark"	January 25, 2024

==== Chapter 4: "The Circle of the Crimson Mirror" ====
No. overall	Part	Title	Original release date
10	1	"Seeking Serenity"	February 29, 2024
11	2	"The Gilded Graveyard"	March 28, 2024
12	3	"Into the Abyss"	April 25, 2024

==== Special ====
No. overall	Part	Title	Original release date
13	1	"Candela Obscura Live – The Circle of the Silver Screen"	May 30, 2024
This episode was recorded live on May 25, 2024 at The United Theater on Broadway in Los Angeles.

== Game system ==
Candela Obscura
- Designers: Rowan Hall (lead designer), Spenser Starke (lead designer), Christopher Grey, Tracey Harrison, Taliesin Jaffe
- Illustrators: Shaun Ellis, Jamie Harrison, Allie Irwin, Amelia Leonards, Lily McDonnell, Justin O’Neal, Sunga Park, Gustavo Rodrigues Pelissari, Doug Telford, John Harper, De La Rosa Design
- Writers: Rowan Hall, Spencer Starke
- Publishers: Darrington Press
- Publication: November 14, 2023
- Genres: Tabletop role-playing game, Horror
- Systems: Illuminated Worlds
- Chance: Dice rolling
- Skills: Role-playing, improvisation
- Website: DarringtonPress.com

Related games
- Blades in the Dark; Vaesen

Candela Obscura is a role-playing game using the Illuminated Worlds role-playing game system, which was designed by Stras Acimovic and Layla Adelman for Darrington Press. The D6-system is best suited for short cinematic story arcs and character-focused narratives. Candela Obscura was created by Jaffe and Lockey, and designed and written by Spenser Starke and Rowan Hall. The show is titled after the game. Mercer, who is the Critical Role Dungeon Master and Candela Obscura show's first gamemaster, commented that "as a GM who's grown up on D&D, having a system that requires me to roll pretty much no dice at all allows me to be entirely present with the players. I wasn't sure if I would like that at first, but it turns out that having the players define the action gives them an extra aspect of immersion".

Polygon reported that the design of Candela Obscura takes "inspiration and some key mechanics from John Harper's beloved heist RPG Blades in the Dark as well as Free League Publishing's Nordic horror game Vaesen". In May 2023, Harper wrote, "it's very cool to see this iteration of Forged in the Dark design from the team at Darrington". On the development of the game system, Starke said he and Hall inherited the Illuminated Worlds system from Acimovic and Adelman, so for them "it was more about marrying the Candela Obscura concept in Taliesin's head with the scaffolding Stras and Layla had already developed". While it has "hallmarks" of the Forged in the Dark system due to Acimovic's design background, Starke commented:

I love so much of what he and Layla crafted specifically for us here. To just hit on one aspect of that, the drive economy is such a player-focused mechanic that really lets you make decisions about when rolls are important to you. I also am really excited about the marks and scars system that Rowan and I developed for Candela specifically, which lets the impacts of the damage you take live with you and, quite literally, change you.

=== Publication ===
Darrington Press released the Candela Obscura Quickstart Guide on May 25, the show's premiere date, which introduces both the Candela Obscura setting and the game system. Darrington Press also ran gameplay sessions of Candela Obscura at Gen Con. The Candela Obscura Core Rulebook was released on November 14, 2023, with two hardcover editions and a digital edition on the Demiplane Nexus platform. Digital editions were then released on Roll20 and DriveThruRPG in December 2023.

Beadle & Grimm partnered with Darrington Press to create a Candela Obscura adventure module titled Horrors of the Fairelands; this sourcebook features eight adventure assignments. Beadle & Grimm is scheduled to release the Horrors of the Fairelands Premium Edition in February 2025 – along with the sourcebook, this edition will include items such as maps, art cards, physical props, other player handouts, and digital integration on various platforms. Following the release of the Premium Edition, Beadle & Grimm will release Horrors of the Fairelands as a standalone sourcebook.

== Reception ==
=== Web series ===
After the first episode, Polygon's Em Friedman compared Candela Obscura to actual play series such as Kollok and Dimension 20's campaign Shriek Week, which are all series based on systems with a single die that allow smoother gameplay and shift the focus on characters and world-building. Friedman also noted how the narrative presents clear phases, controlled by Mercer, and considered the series a good visual representation of the game. Friedman commented that "while Darrington Press is not branding Illuminated Worlds as a system nor Candela Obscura as a game specifically intended for performed play, it's clear that the rules are designed to get out of the way, avoiding lengthy rules lookups that can bog down live play". Linda Codega, for Io9, stated that while "Mercer is an incredible Game Master", his "style of play" made them feel that the "guardrails" in the first episode are "a little too high". Codega wrote that "rarely are there questions of difference raised between character decisions and GM intention, because in this episode of Candela Obscura the players and the GM are working in near-perfect sync. [...] While this gameplay style can be conducive to a collaborative storytelling process, in Candela Obscura, the result is a gaunt game that is, at best, just good". After the release of the second chapter's first episode, Tara McCauley of CBR commented positively on the transition between chapters – "the shift in tone and thematic exploration between the two parties showcases the enticing anthological capabilities of Candela Obscura". McCauley highlighted the "format and production" of the series which has led to "a more immersive, almost radio-play style, experience for audiences" and that the costuming of the cast in each arc adds "a theatrical dimension to the series' performances". McCauley also emphasized the impact of the set's lighting and sound design especially in scenes focused on a character's PTSD.

Gena McCrann of Dicebreaker called Starke's game master style "cinematic" and that "he lays out his scenes in the language of film". McCrann viewed the second chapter as a very "character-driven" arc with players who are also a surrogate audience which is emphasized when "they feel the same horror and joy and investment in this as we do". Christian Hoffer, for ComicBook.com in August 2023, highlighted the change in the VOD broadcast schedule for the second chapter noting that "while the VOD version of Candela Obscura Episode 1 had 1.1 million views, the finale of the three-arc chapter had 165,000 views by comparison". Hoffer commented that Ray, as creative director for Critical Role, stated "the two week window meant that it was initially hard for people to start watching on a live stream and then finish on the VOD version" so the aim of shorting the gap between initial broadcast and VOD is to increase viewership". In June 2024, Tara McCauley for The Escapist highlighted the "effortless" design of the show which allows the audience to "jump into Candela Obscura's narrative at any point" – "while Candela Obscura's three-episode arcs are easily digestible, The Circle of the Silver Screen's single-episode performance assures the swiftest on-ramp into Critical Role's horror venture". McCauley commented that the actual play "anthology's short-form narratives and manageable schedule present a draw to new audiences, especially those previously intimidated by the main show's extensive back catalog. However, as the series represents the company's foray into game publishing, it has plenty to entice long-time fans invested in the channel's growth beyond the confines of Dungeons & Dragons".

=== Tabletop role-playing game system ===
Codega wrote that there's "nothing wrong" with either "Candela Obscura (the game)" or "Candela Obscura (the performance). But both are, disappointingly, not doing anything particularly novel". After reviewing the Candela Obscura Quickstart Guide, Chase Carter for Dicebreaker felt "ambivalent" about the game's ability to create a bridge that would allow "the colloquial Critters an avenue into the rich vein of tabletop titles beyond Wizards of the Coast's shadow".

Critical reviews of the Candela Obscura tabletop role-playing game system tend to emphasize its inferiority to previous games in the horror genre, particularly its direct inspiration Blades in the Dark. Samantha Nelson wrote in the Polygon review "Critical Role’s Candela Obscura is but a pale shadow of its inspiration, Blades in the Dark" that the Newfaire setting "feels fairly homogeneous", that "the sample sessions play out like fairly bland procedurals", and that overall the game "might make a great way for the Critical Role crew to show off their acting talents, but it doesn’t seem as useful for someone who just wants to run a game at home with their friends." Dan Arndt, in a review of the Candela Obscura Core Rulebook for The Fandomentals, commented that his "biggest issue" was the game's "inability to actually create something that feels actually original, and part of that comes down to its failure as a piece of horror" since "horror works when it's being transgressive" and "Candela Obscura is so worried about making sure everyone feels 'safe' at the table, so worried that people won't think it's endorsing any bad actions, that it rips out its own teeth and shows you the gums. It's not even defanged because I don't think it even had fangs". Arndt opined that other horror games such as Vaesen and Blades In the Dark are better at "everything that Candela Obscura wants to do". Aaron Marks of the ENNIE Award nominated website Cannibal Halfling Gaming commented that "at the end of the day, we have a Forged in the Dark game, distilled for Actual Play use. Many of the setting principles of Blades in the Dark and Vaesen are there but dulled down, lightening up the darkness and removing any allusions to actual capitalist exploitation or actual commentary on Christian expansion and hegemony as existed in Vaesen".

Critics disagree about how well the game handles social justice issues. Nelson for Polygon wrote that Candela Obscura "makes vague efforts at exploring themes of social justice with plots involving corruption and police malfeasance, but they are hamstrung by the game’s explicit denial of intersectionality". However, Hayley McCullough, in a positive review for the American Journalism Historians Association, commented that while Candela Obscura incorporates cosmic horror, it "does not uncritically reproduce the problematic elements of Lovecraftian Horror" and instead "challenges the legacy of harm associated with the genre and its offshoots and encourages players to adopt inclusive styles of storytelling and gameplay as part of its rules".
