= If I Were a Lich, Man =

2023 comedic tabletop role-playing games

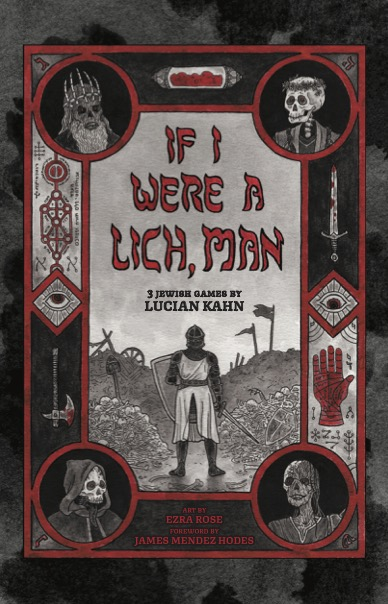
- Designers: Lucian Kahn
- Illustrators: Ezra Rose
- Publishers: Hit Point Press
- Publication: 2023
- Genres: Tabletop role-playing game, comedy

If I Were a Lich, Man is a boxed set of three comedic, Jewish tabletop role-playing games about creative resistance against authoritarianism. The games were written by Lucian Kahn and illustrated by Ezra Rose. The box contains three games: "If I Were a Lich, Man," "Same Bat Time, Same Bat Mitzvah," and "Grandma's Drinking Song." It was written between 2017 and 2020 in opposition to fascism in the United States. It was published by Hit Point Press in 2023 after the publisher's kickstarter campaign raised $84,590 in two weeks. It won an ENNIE Award and an Indie Game Developer Network award. The trilogy was inspired by two TV shows, What We Do in the Shadows and Russian Doll.

== Games ==
"If I Were a Lich, Man" is an anti-fascist four-player game about a family meeting of Jewish liches arguing about how to defend themselves against killer paladins who represent white supremacy and Christian hegemony in America. It uses dreidels instead of dice. "Same Bat Time, Same Bat Mitzvah" is a LARP for 7 to 13 players. It is about a Bat Mitzvah party where the attendees are turning into vampires. "Grandma's Drinking Song" is another four-player game. The players write a drinking song together while performing short scenes based on Kahn's ancestors' true stories about working as bootleggers during Prohibition in New York City.

== Themes ==
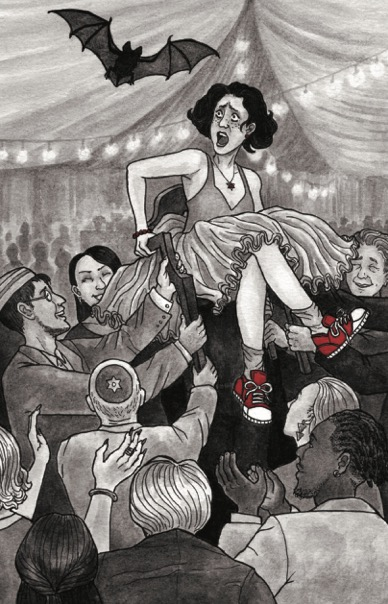
Interior illustration for Same Bat Time, Same Bat Mitzvah

The games reappropriate antisemitic tropes to rethink fantasy monsters and criminals as "figures of resistance." Kahn explained the thinking behind this in an interview with Lindsay Eanet for the Jewish Telegraphic Agency:

“There’s a long tradition of looking at the monster and seeing that the reason why these are monsters is because the people who have oppressive power have decided that these are going to be the enemies of the ‘good’ oppressive powers...But if you don’t agree with their ideology, if you’re seeing yourself as being a member of a marginalized community and being in opposition to these oppressive powers, then you can look at the qualities assigned to these monsters and some of them are qualities that are good.”

The instruction manual contains a foreword and afterword about Jewish culture by Filipino Jewish writer James Mendez Hodes. Hodes worked as lead designer on Avatar Legends: The Roleplaying Game, which also deals with themes of systemic oppression.

== Reception ==
If I Were a Lich, Man won the 2024 Silver ENNIE Award for Best Family Game / Product. The dreidels were nominated for the 2023 Origins Awards for Best Dice-Related Product. The prototype for the title game "If I Were a Lich, Man" won the Indie Game Developer Network award for "Most Innovative" in 2020. The prototype for "Same Bat Time, Same Bat Mitzvah" was a finalist in the 200 Word RPG Challenge in 2018.

Fantastic Games wrote that If I Were a Lich, Man "invites players into a dialogue with the past, challenges the status quo, and does so with wit, humor, and unapologetic boldness […] in the intersection of gaming and cultural commentary".
