= Banana Chan =

Game designer and writer

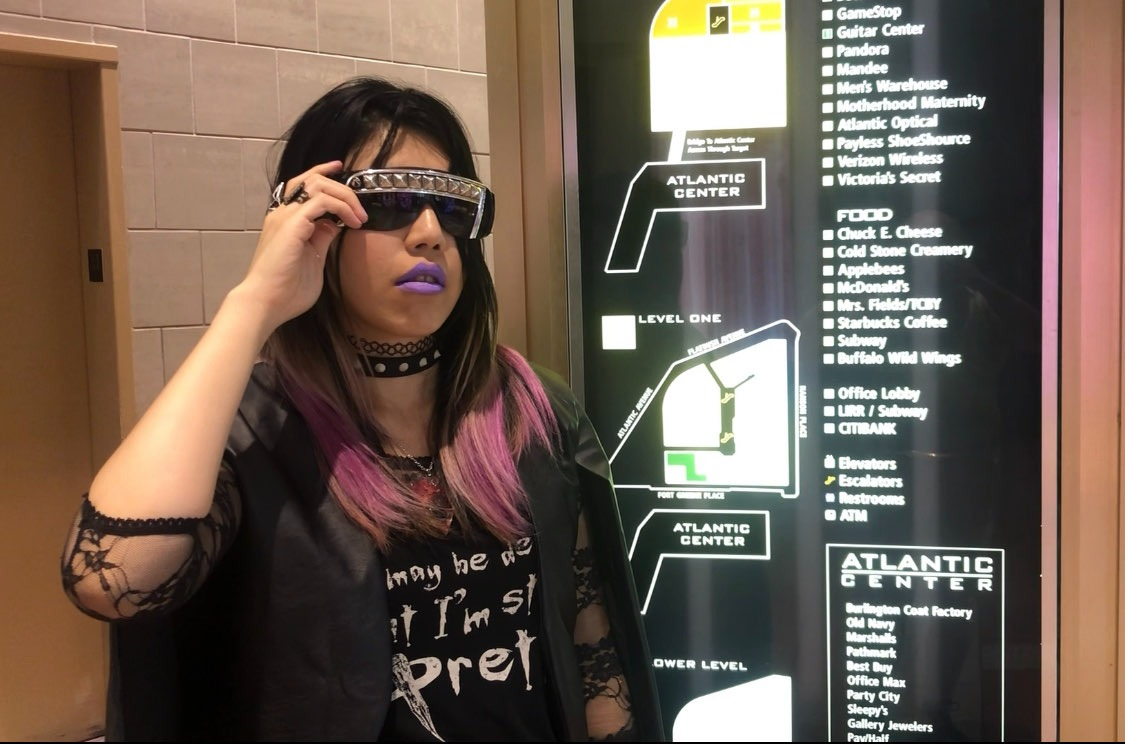
- Banana Chan (2019)
- Occupation: game designer
- Genre: tabletop role-playing games, board games

Banana Chan is a game designer and writer for tabletop role-playing games and board games. Chan and Sen-Foong Lim created Jiangshi: Blood in the Banquet Hall (2021). Chan has written for over twenty tabletop games, including the official Dungeons & Dragons campaign setting Van Richten's Guide to Ravenloft (2021), Dune: Adventures in the Imperium, and the third edition of Betrayal at House on the Hill (2022).

Chan is the owner and co-founder of the tabletop publishing company Read/Write Memory, formerly known as Game and a Curry.

== Works ==
=== Roleplaying games and supplements ===
Banana Chan has written for many titles in tabletop games, both as a lead designer and as a hired freelancer.

- Writer and Designer: The Imposters (2018)
- Writer: The North Sea Epilogues (2018)
- Narrative Designer: Sea of Legends (2020)
- Writer: Van Richten's Guide to Ravenloft (2021)
- Writer: Dune: Adventures in the Imperium (2021)
- Writer, Co-Designer and Co-Creator: Jiangshi: Blood in the Banquet Hall (2021)
- Writer and Co-Designer: Questlings: RPG (2021)
- Writer, Co-Designer and Co-Creator: Suburban Consumption of the Monstrous (2022)
- Writer, Co-Designer and Co-Creator: An Exquisite Crime (2022)
- Writer: Pathfinder 2E Lost Omens: Knights of Lastwall (2022)
- Writer: Pathfinder 2E Dark Archive (2022)
- Co-Designer: Alice is Missing: Silent Falls, Kickstarter edition (2023)
- Writer: Pathfinder 2E Lost Omens: Tian Xia World Guide (2024)
- Writer, Co-Designer and Creator: Deimos Academy (2024)
- Writer, Co-Designer and Co-Creator: The Revenant Society: The Endless Loop Beneath the City (2024)
- Writer, Designer and Creator: Forgery (2024)
- Writer: Daggerheart (2025)
- Writer, Designer and Creator: The Darkness at the Brink of Ohio (2025)
- Writer, Designer and Creator: Knockoff (2026)

=== Kids on Bikes ===
Chan worked on multiple products in the Kids on Bikes series.

- Module Writer: Dads on Mowers (2018)
- Co-author: Grannies on Scooters (2020)
- Module Writer: Doggos on Skateboards (2020)
- Module Writer: Anacondas on Airliners (2020)

=== Board games ===
- Short Story Writer: Terror Below (2019)
- Lead Haunt Writer, Scooby-Doo: Betrayal at Mystery Mansion (2020)
- Writer: Warp’s Edge (2020)
- Writer: Atheneum; Mystic Library (2020)
- Character Writer: Critical Care (2021)
- Haunt Writer: Betrayal at House on the Hill 3rd Edition (2022)
- Co-Designer: Mr. Lovenstein Presents: No Context (2023)
- Co-Designer: Chucky (2024), the officially licensed board game for Child's Play

== Awards and nominations ==
Awards

In 2016, Chan won Best Pervasive Game in the Golden Cobra Challenge for her live action roleplaying game They're Onto Me. In 2022, Chan won the title of Designer of the Year from Dicebreaker's Tabletop Awards. The same year, she won three ENnies Awards: Jiangshi: Blood in the Banquet Hall (Silver Ennie for "Best Setting"), Questlings: RPG (Silver Ennie for "Best Family Game / Product"), and Dune – Adventures in the Imperium: Core Rulebook (Gold Ennie for "Best Writing").

Nominations and Honorable Mentions

In 2015, Chan was given an Honorable Mention in the Golden Cobra Challenge for her live action roleplaying game The Other Place. In 2022, Chan and Sen-Foong Lim, along with the Game and a Curry and Wet Ink Games teams, were nominated for ENnies in three categories for Jiangshi: Blood in the Banquet Hall: Best Setting (which they won), Best Production Value and Product of the Year. The same year, Chan and Game and a Curry were also nominated for Best Family Game/Product for their game Questlings: RPG in collaboration with Letiman Games and Tim Devine. In addition to the ENnies, Jiangshi was nominated for the 2022 Indie Game Developer Network's Indie Groundbreaker Awards for "Most Innovative."
