= One Shot Podcast Network =

Podcast series about role-playing games

- Founder: James D'Amato
- Website: https://oneshotpodcast.com/

One Shot Podcast Network is a network of podcast series about tabletop role-playing games, with many shows dedicated to actual play, interviews, and discussion. It was founded by James D'Amato to showcase a wide variety of games and systems, including indie role-playing games, as an alternative to actual play shows that focus exclusively on Dungeons & Dragons.

The network has won multiple ENNIE Awards. As of April 2023, the network was funded by collective monthly contributions of $6,699 per month from 1,046 users on Patreon.

== Shows ==
=== Current shows ===
One Shot is the flagship show of the network. D'Amato typically runs a self-contained actual play of a different game system each week, with occasional multi-episode storylines. Episodes last about an hour. Em Friedman for Polygon recommended One Shot as one of the best actual play podcasts that don't use DnD. In 2020, fantasy author Patrick Rothfuss collaborated with One Shot to produce an actual play series set in the world of The Kingkiller Chronicle.

Asians Represent! both highlights the work of Asian creators and holds analytical conversations about the depiction of Asian people and cultures in tabletop role-playing games. It is hosted by Daniel Kwan and Agatha Cheng. Asians Represent! won the 2020 and 2021 Gold ENNIE Awards for Best Podcast. It was also nominated in 2019.

Character Creation Cast is a show where the hosts and guests create characters in a tabletop rpg system. They also discuss the design of the game and offer commentary.

=== Past shows ===
Backstory was an interview show hosted by Alex Roberts (game designer) from 2016 to 2019. She interviewed game designers and other workers in tabletop role-playing games.

The Broadswords was an all-women and non-binary Dungeons & Dragons actual play show with a focus on storytelling and inclusivity.

== Related media ==
D'Amato is the author of Simon & Schuster's "Ultimate RPG" book series:

- The Ultimate RPG Character Backstory Guide (2018)
- The Ultimate RPG Gameplay Guide (2019)
- The Ultimate Micro-RPG Book (2020)
- The Ultimate RPG Game Master's Worldbuilding Guide (2021)
- The Ultimate RPG Campfire Card Deck (2023)
