= Alex Roberts (game designer) =

Canadian role-playing game designer

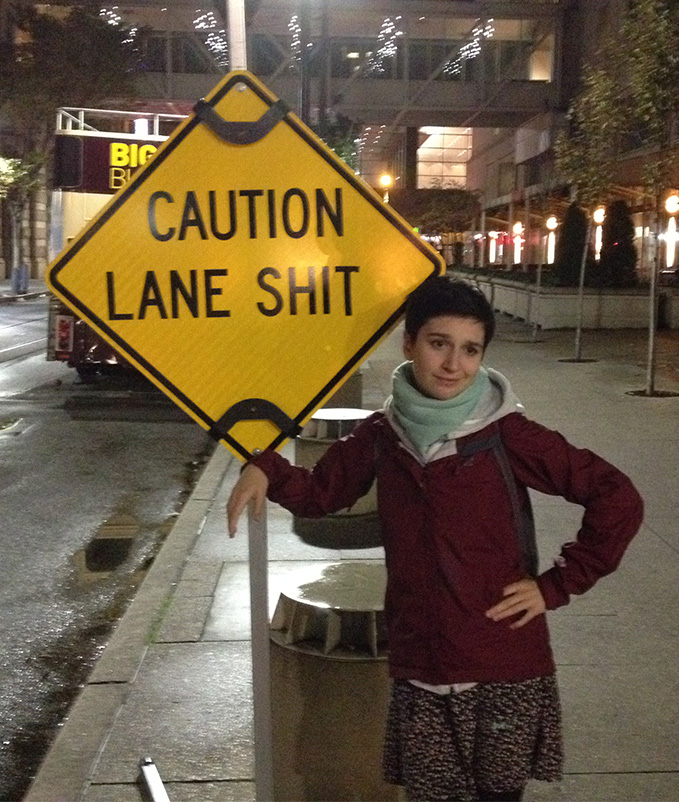
- Roberts at PAX Unplugged (2023) in Philadelphia, Pennsylvania.
- Occupation: Game designer
- Notable work: For the Queen (game), Star Crossed (game)
- Website: www.helloalexroberts.com

Alex Roberts is a Canadian tabletop role-playing game designer. Her games typically lack a gamemaster (GM) and include romantic themes. Her games include For the Queen and Star Crossed.

== Career ==
Roberts was the host of the role-playing games podcast "Backstory" on the One Shot Podcast Network from 2016 to 2019.

=== Games ===
Roberts made Star Crossed, published by Bully Pulpit Games in 2019, a game about forbidden romantic pairings. It was funded via a Kickstarter campaign. The game won the 2019 Diana Jones Award. The use of a Jenga tower as a game mechanic to heighten tension was inspired by the horror role-playing game Dread.

Roberts designed For the Queen, a GM-less storytelling card game that initiated the genre of games called "Descended from the Queen." For the Queen was first published by Evil Hat Productions in 2019, then an updated version was published by Critical Role's imprint Darrington Press in 2024. Emily St. James, for Vox, stated in 2020 that "Roberts is one of the RPG creators whose work most excites me right now, and For the Queen is her best game"; in 2022, she called Roberts "one of the best RPG designers working right now".

Roberts designed the game Pop! in 2020 for the LARP anthology Honey & Hot Wax. In a 2024 interview with Polygon, Roberts said, "The best game I’ve ever made is Pop! It’s a live-action game about a community of balloon fetishists." She created the two player play-by-post game Our Time on Earth in 2021.

Roberts contributed design work for Till the Last Gasp (2023), a 2-player dueling game published by Darrington Press. Linda Codega for Io9 described Till the Last Gasp as a blend of Will Hindmarch's tactical, mathematical design approach with Alex Roberts' "established" experience "designing immersive two-player games".

=== Counseling ===
In addition to working as a game designer, Roberts runs a counseling service.

== Works ==
Title	Publisher	Credits	Date	Ref.
For the Queen	Evil Hat Productions	Designer	2019	
Star Crossed	Bully Pulpit Games	Designer	2019	
Hero Dog Saves Town (in the anthology The Ultimate Micro-RPG Book)	Simon & Schuster	Author	2020	
POP! (in the anthology Honey & Hot Wax)	Pelgrane Press	Author	2020	
Our Time on Earth	Itch.io	Designer	2021	
Till the Last Gasp	Darrington Press	Designer	2023	
For the Queen 2E	Darrington Press	Designer	2024	
