= Indie Game Developer Network =

Trade association for independent game designers

The Indie Game Developer Network (IGDN) is a trade association for developers of indie role-playing games, board games, card games, and LARPs. They present the annual Indie Groundbreaker Awards at Gen Con. Their other programs include a scholarship to attend the game designer convention Metatopia, a mentorship program, and a peer coaching program.

== Indie Groundbreaker Awards ==
The Indie Groundbreaker Awards began in 2016 and are offered in 5 categories: Game of the Year, Best Art, Best Setting, Best Rules, and Most Innovative. They are judged by a rotating panel of game designers. After the Indie RPG Awards gave their final set of awards in 2017, IGDN's Indie Groundbreaker Awards took on their function in the tabletop role-playing game community of evaluating and recognizing achievements in independent game design.

Award Winners by Year

2016

| Award | Game | Credits |
|---|---|---|
| Game of the Year | A Real Game | Aura Belle |
| Best Art | Fall of Magic | Ross Cowman (Heart of the Deernicorn) |
| Best Setting | Downfall | Caroline Hobbs (Less Than Three Games) |
| Best Rules | Death of Legends | Imaginary Empire |
| Most Innovative | 183 Days | Tiny Knives |

2017

| Award | Game | Credits |
|---|---|---|
| Game of the Year | Seven Wonders | Pelgrane Press |
| Best Art | Fellowship | Liberi Gothica Games |
| Best Setting | War Birds | |
| Best Rules | Masks: A New Generation | Magpie Games |
| Most Innovative | The Beast | |

2018

| Award | Game | Credits |
|---|---|---|
| Game of the Year | Bluebeard's Bride | Whitney "Strix" Beltrán, Marissa Kelly, Sarah Doombringer (Magpie Games) |
| Best Art | Bluebeard's Bride | Whitney "Strix" Beltrán, Marissa Kelly, Sarah Doombringer (Magpie Games) |
| Best Setting | Arecibo | Evil Hat Productions |
| Best Rules | Damn the Man, Save the Music | Hannah Shaffer |
| Most Innovative | Feast | Sharang Biswas |
| Groundbreaking Supplement | Harlem Unbound | Chris Spivey |

2019

| Award | Game | Credits |
|---|---|---|
| Game of the Year | Dialect: A Game About Language and How It Dies | Kathryn Hymes and Hakan Seyalıoğlu (Thorny Games) |
| Best Art | Bluebeard's Bride: Book of Rooms | Whitney "Strix" Beltrán, Marissa Kelly, Sarah Doombringer (Magpie Games) |
| Best Setting | The Way of Pukona | Evil Hat Productions |
| Best Rules | Good Society (game) | Storybrewers Roleplaying (Vee Hendro and Hayley Gordon) |
| Most Innovative | Verdure | Sharang Biswas |

2020

| Award | Game | Credits |
|---|---|---|
| Game of the Year | Companions' Tale | Laura Simpson |
| Best Art | Humblewood | Hit Point Press |
| Best Setting | Afterlife: Wandering Souls | Angry Hamster Publishing |
| Best Rules | Mazes | 9th Level Games |
| Most Innovative | If I Were a Lich, Man | Lucian Kahn |

2021

| Award | Game | Credits |
|---|---|---|
| Game of the Year | Crescendo Giocoso Ritornello | The Italian Chamber Orchestra |
| Best Art | Lutong Banwa | Diwata ng Manila |
| Best Setting | Karanduun - Make God Bleed | Joaquin Kyle Saavedra |
| Best Rules | Slayers | Spencer Campbell |
| Most Innovative | This Discord Has Ghosts In It | Will Jobst and Adam Vass (World Champ Game Co.) |

2022

| Award | Game | Credits |
|---|---|---|
| Game of the Year | Brave Zenith | Giuliano Roverato and Rodrigo Melchior |
| Best Art | A Fantastic Longing for Adventure | Tim Hutchings |
| Best Setting | Arcon: City of Neon Daylight | Kienna Shaw and Jason Cutrone |
| Best Rules | GUN&SLINGER | Nevyn Holmes |
| Most Innovative | My Body is a Cage | Batts |

2023

| Award | Game | Credits |
|---|---|---|
| Game of the Year | Slugblaster: Kickflip Over a Quantum Centipede | Mikey Hamm |
| Best Art | Dinocar | Julie-Anne Muñoz |
| Best Graphic Design | Butter Princess | Brian Sago, graphic design by Mike Martens |
| Best Setting | Gubat Banwa | Joaquin Kyle Saavedra |
| Best Rules | Saltfish and Almanacs | Storybrewers Roleplaying (Vee Hendro and Hayley Gordon) |
| Most Innovative | The Sticker Game | Cassi Mothwin and Joshua Peters |
