= History of role-playing games =

The history of role-playing games began when disparate traditions of historical reenactment, improvisational theatre, and parlour games combined with the rulesets of fantasy wargames in the 1970s to give rise to tabletop role-playing games (TTRPGs). Multiple TTRPGs were produced between the 1970s and early 1990s. In the 1990s, TTRPGs faced a decline in popularity. Indie role-playing game design communities arose on the internet in the early 2000s and introduced new ideas. In the late 2010s and early 2020s, TTRPGs experienced renewed popularity due to videoconferencing, the rise of actual play, and online marketplaces.

== Historical re-enactment, improv theatre, and murder mystery games ==
Historical re-enactment has been practiced by adults for millennia. The ancient Han Chinese organized events in which participants pretended to be from an earlier age with entertainment appearing to be the primary purpose of these activities. In 16th century Europe, traveling teams of players performed a form of improvisational theatre known as the Commedia dell'arte, with stock situations, stock characters and improvised dialogue. In the 19th and early 20th century, many board games and parlour games such as the game Jury Box included elements of role-playing. At the same time in Shanghai, role-playing characters from literature works was an integral part of the Chinese courtesan behavior. Mock trials, model legislatures, and the "Theatre Games" created by Viola Spolin arose, in which players took on the roles of characters and improvised, but without the formalised rules which would characterise modern role-playing games.

There is some evidence that assassin-style games may have been played in New York city by adults as early as 1920. A murder mystery game in which a murder was performed by saying, "You're dead," was mentioned in Harpo Marx's autobiography, Harpo Speaks!, in a section covering the 1920s. In the 1960s, historical reenactment groups gave rise to "creative history" games, which probably originate with the founding of the Society for Creative Anachronism in Berkeley, California on May 1, 1966. A similar group, the Markland Medieval Mercenary Militia, began holding events on the University of Maryland, College Park in 1969. These groups were largely dedicated to accurately recreating medieval history and culture, however, with only mild fantasy elements, and were probably mostly influenced by historical re-enactment.

== Wargames ==
Wargames have origins in ancient strategy games, particularly chess. It originated as chaturanga, created in the 6th-century Indian subcontinent as a simulation of ancient Indian warfare, particularly the Kurukshetra War (from the Indian epic Mahabharata), with pieces representing roles such as rajas, mantri (counselers), infantry, cavalry, chariots and war elephants. Chaturanga is considered the most ancient ancestor of Dungeons & Dragons. According to RPG designer John Wick, Chess can be turned into a role-playing game if chess pieces such as the king, queen, rooks, knights or pawns are given names, and decisions are made based on their motivations. According to Wick, Dungeons & Dragons was a "sophisticated, intricate and complicated combat simulation board game that people were turning into a roleplaying game" just "like giving your rook a motive" in Chess.

In Europe, from the late 18th century to the 19th century, chess variants evolved into modern wargames. Drawing inspiration from chess, Helwig, Master of Pages to the Duke of Brunswick, created a battle emulation game in 1780. According to Max Boot's book War Made New (2006, pg 122), sometime between 1803 and 1809, the Prussian General Staff developed war games, with staff officers moving metal pieces around on a game table (with blue pieces representing their forces and red pieces those of the enemy), using dice rolls to indicate random chance and with a referee scoring the results. Increasingly realistic variations became part of military training in the 19th century in many nations, and were called "Kriegsspiele" or "wargames". Wargames or military exercises are still an important part of military training today.

Wargaming moved from professional training to the hobby market with the publication of Little Wars, children's toy soldier game, by H.G. Wells in 1913. A niche hobby of wargaming emerged for adults that recreated model games around actual battles from the Napoleonic Wars onward. Although a single marker or miniature figure typically represented a squad of soldiers, some "skirmish level" or "man to man" games did exist where one figure represented one entity only. The board wargame Diplomacy, invented by Allan B. Calhamer in 1954 and released in 1959, made social interaction and interpersonal skills part of its gameplay. A live-action variant of Diplomacy named Slobbovia was used for character development rather than conflict.

== Late 1960s to early 70s: fantasy, wargaming, and the dawn of TTRPGs ==
In the late 1960s, fantasy elements were increasingly used in wargames. Linguist M. A. R. Barker began to use wargame-like sessions to develop his creation Tékumel. In 1970, the New England Wargamers Association demonstrated a fantasy wargame called Middle Earth at a convention of the Military Figure Collectors Association. Fantasy writer Greg Stafford created the board wargame White Bear and Red Moon to explore conflicts in his fantasy world Glorantha, though it did not see publication until 1974. A wargame session was held at the University of Minnesota in 1969, with Dave Wesely as the moderator, in which the players represented single characters in a Napoleonic scenario centering on a small town named Braunstein. This did not lead to any further experimentation in the same vein immediately, but the ground had been laid. It actually bore greater resemblance to later LARP games than what would conventionally be thought of as a role-playing game. Wesely would, later in the year, run a second "Braunstein," placing the players in the roles of government officials and revolutionaries in a fictional banana republic.

Gary Gygax and Jeff Perren of Lake Geneva's wargaming society developed a set of rules for a late medieval milieu under the influence from Siege of Bodenburg. This unusual wargame saw publication in 1971 under the name Chainmail. Although Chainmail was a historical game, later editions included an appendix for adding fantasy elements such as wizards and dragons. The two games, one of Wesely's along with the Chainmail ruleset, would be used partially by Dave Arneson who was a participant to Wesely's sessions, to focus his ideas regarding a fantasy realm known as Blackmoor, and by 1971, Arneson would be running what could be conventionally recognized as a role-playing game based on his Blackmoor world.

Blackmoor contained core elements that would become widespread in fantasy gaming: hit points, experience points, character levels, armor class, and dungeon crawls. Like the wargames it grew from, Blackmoor used miniature figures and terrain grids to illustrate the action. The key difference with the Blackmoor games, which allowed it to become a game distinct from the wargame-based Braunsteins, was the ability of the players to set their own character goals, in addition to the scenario goals set by Arneson. Arneson and Gygax then met and collaborated on the first Dungeons & Dragons game.

== 1974 to early 80s: the first TTRPGs, religious controversy, and video game RPGs ==
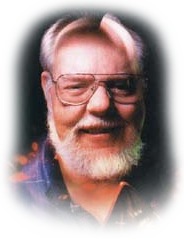
Dave Arneson, co-author of Dungeons & Dragons, the first modern role-playing game

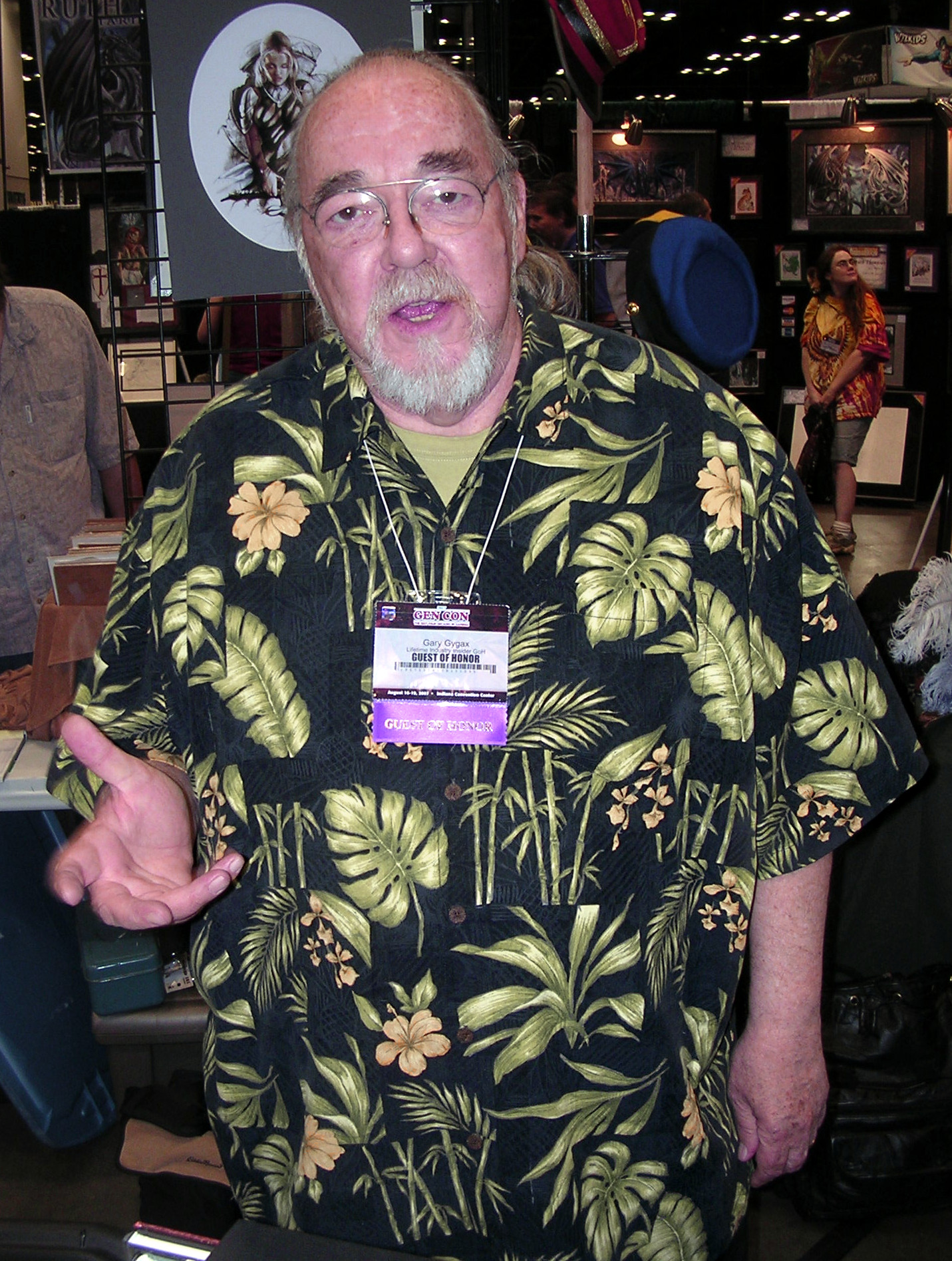
Gary Gygax, co-author of Dungeons & Dragons, the first modern role-playing game

=== The first tabletop RPGs ===
The first commercially available role-playing game, Dungeons & Dragons (D&D), was published in 1974 by Gygax's TSR which marketed the game as a niche product. Gygax expected to sell about 50,000 copies. After establishing itself in boutique stores it developed a cult following among college students and SF fandom. The game's growing success spawned cottage industries and a variety of peripheral products. In a few years other fantasy games appeared, some of which having a similar look and feel of the original game. One of the earliest competitors was Tunnels and Trolls (1975).

Other early fantasy games included Empire of the Petal Throne (1974/75), Chivalry & Sorcery (1977), Arduin (1977) and RuneQuest (1978). Meanwhile, Science Fiction role-playing was introduced in Metamorphosis Alpha (1976), Traveller (1977) and Gamma World (1978) while the Superhero genre was first represented by Superhero: 2044 (1977). Empire of the Petal Throne and City State of the Invincible Overlord (1976) pioneered the concept of ready-made campaign settings. Live-action groups such as Dagorhir were started, and organized gaming conventions and publications such as Dragon Magazine (1976–) catered to the growing hobby.

From 1977 to 1979, TSR launched Advanced Dungeons & Dragons (AD&D). This ambitious project expanded the rules to a small library of hardcover books. These covered such minutiae as the chance of finding a singing sword in a pile of loot or the odds of coaxing gossip from a tavern keeper. Optional modules in the form of small booklets offered prepared adventure settings. The first edition Dungeon Master's Guide published in 1979 included a recommended reading list of twenty-five authors. Literary and mythological references helped draw new fans to the game. During this time, the genre drew nationwide attention and fan base expanded to teens and lower.

=== Religious controversy ===
However, success became a mixed blessing for TSR. The company was involved in some legal disputes and criticism from mainstream media and religious fundamentalist groups was increasing. Since role-playing games are substantially different from competitive games such as ball games and card games, public confusion arose about the nature of fantasy gaming. Dungeons & Dragons was a subject of controversy in the 1980s when well-publicized opponents claimed it caused negative spiritual and psychological effects. (Academic research has discredited these claims, and some educators support role-playing games as a healthy way to hone reading and arithmetic skills.) Many claimed that TSR's games contained demonic rituals and directly led to suicide attempts by its players. Religious organizations made pamphlets warning of the dangers of role-playing games, and public advocacy groups like Bothered about Dungeons & Dragons were formed in a failed attempt to remove the game from game store shelves. Though role-playing has been accepted by some religious organizations, a few continue to object. Media attention both increased sales and stigmatized certain games. The company underwent dramatic growth, peaking at 300 employees in 1984.

=== Characteristics, skills, and universal systems ===
New publishers entered the scene, such as Chaosium (RuneQuest, 1978 and Call of Cthulhu, 1981), Iron Crown Enterprises (RoleMaster, 1980), Palladium (The Mechanoid Invasion, 1981), Victory Games (James Bond 007 RPG, 1983), and West End Games (Paranoia, 1984). These games were all based on a characteristics/skill system, following the trail blazed by Traveller.

The staff of Chaosium realized by the late 1970s that the RuneQuest system designed by Steve Perrin had enough potential to become the "house system" for the company, which could then use one set of game mechanics for multiple games; Greg Stafford and Lynn Willis proved this correct by slimming the RuneQuest rules down into the 16-page Basic Role-Playing (1980). Hero Games used the rules for their Champions game to form the basis for their Hero System. The house system from Pacesetter Ltd focused on a universal "action table" consisting of one chart to be used for resolution of all actions within the game. Steve Jackson wanted to design a role-playing game rules system and had three goals in mind: this system must be detailed and realistic; it must be logical and well-organized; and this system must be adaptable enough to be used with any setting and level of play; this system of rules was eventually released as GURPS (1986). The Palladium house system was initially derived from Dungeons & Dragons and was ultimately used in all of the Palladium Books titles. Mekton II (1987) by R. Talsorian Games debuted the full version of their Interlock System of rules.

=== The dawn of role-playing video games ===
Role-playing games began to influence other media. The first role-playing video games arose from early mainframe computer imitations of RPGs, with Akalabeth and Rogue both published in 1980; the genre inherited many of the settings and game mechanics of RPGs as well as the name, and went on to have its own varied history. During this time, RPG-themed adventure gamebooks and solitaire RPGs such as Choose Your Own Adventure (1979–), Endless Quest (1982–) and Fighting Fantasy (1982–) series also gained popularity. An animated television series based on Dungeons & Dragons was produced in 1983, also called Dungeons & Dragons.

== Mid-1980s to early 90s: various settings and systems ==
=== Settings and systems ===
The second edition of Dungeons & Dragons, launched in 1988, downplayed literary elements to reduce objections. Surviving artifacts of this heritage and its influence on the wider gaming community include widespread use of Tolkienesque character types and the persistence of the gaming term "vorpal." Borrowed from Lewis Carroll's poem Jabberwocky, this was the first edition's most powerful magic sword.

Up to this stage, each game had tied itself to a particular setting; If a player wanted to play in a science-fiction game and a fantasy game, they had to learn two game systems. Attempts were made in Advanced Dungeons & Dragons to allow cross-genre games using Gamma World (1978) and Boot Hill (1975) rules, but the obscure rules went largely unused. Some companies bucked this trend, however. Chaosium produced a book titled Basic Role-Playing (1981), which was the first generic role-playing game system. It originated in the fantasy-oriented RuneQuest role-playing game rules and was used in Call of Cthulhu, Stormbringer (1981) and other games. The Hero System, first introduced in Champions (1981), was also used in Justice, Inc. (1984), Fantasy Hero (1985) and other games. Steve Jackson Games followed with GURPS (the Generic Universal Roleplaying System) in 1986.

Champions (1981) also introduced game balance between player characters to role-playing games. Whereas in Dungeons & Dragons players created characters randomly using dice, newer games began to use a system whereby each player was given a number of character points to spend to get characteristics, skills, advantages, getting more points by accepting low characteristics, disadvantages, and so forth.

The game Ars Magica (1988) emphasized characterization and storytelling over game mechanics and combat. The game was brought to White Wolf, Inc. by co-author Mark Rein-Hagen, who took the same approach in his game Vampire: The Masquerade (1991), a gothic horror themed game whose setting appealed to the growing goth subculture; the game was a success and spawned a number of spinoffs which were brought together as the World of Darkness. This style of storytelling game lent itself well to live-action role-playing games. Meanwhile, Jonathan Tweet, the other author of Ars Magica, wrote Over the Edge (1992) and Everway (1995), games light on rules content or power gaming but which set the tone for later generations of less conventional RPGs.

Game Designers' Workshop released the Twilight: 2000 second edition game rule system in 1990, and decided to use its game system as their house system, under which they would design all of their subsequent role-playing games. Amazing Engine from TSR was a universal game system, intended as a simple system for beginners. Hero Games partnered with R. Talsorian in 1996 and worked together to create a simpler rules system to draw new players, by merging the Hero System with the Interlock system and calling it Fuzion. Dragonlance: Fifth Age (1996) was built on the SAGA storytelling game system from TSR, which used a resource management system involving cards instead of die rolls. TSR published the Alternity (1997) universal game system, which was intended only for science-fiction games. The Masterbook system had failed to catch on as a house system for West End Games, so they published the D6 System which was based on their successful Star Wars: The Roleplaying Game.

=== International market ===
Translations allowed the hobby to spread to other countries. New games began to be produced outside America, such as Midgard (1981) and The Dark Eye (1984) in Germany, Drakar och Demoner (1982) in Sweden, Warhammer Fantasy Roleplay (1986) in the United Kingdom, Adventurers of the North - Kalevala Heroes (1989) in Finland and Enterprise: Role Play Game in Star Trek (1983) and Sword World RPG (1989) in Japan.

In Italy, the hybrid sci-fi adventure boxed game VII Legio (1982) containing RPG elements and original role-playing games by local authors - I Signori del Caos in 1983 and Kata Kumbas in 1984 - preceded the translation of Dungeons & Dragons in 1985 and of many other foreign titles. Besides many truly old-school games, local designers released quite original games as the completely narrative Holmes & Company (1987) - a detective game with not even rules for combat - and On Stage! (1995), where players bid for the control of each scene and actually take in turns the role of game master. Role-playing games have a widespread use in schools and libraries; public institutions even released easy role-playing games to be freely distributed for that purpose to teachers and librarians, like Orlando Furioso (City Council of Rome, 1993) and Giocastoria (City Council of Modena, 1998).

France was hit by the role-playing wave in the mid-1980s, as seen by the translations into French of Dungeons & Dragons in 1983 (first role-playing game to be translated), Call of Cthulhu in 1984, Advanced Dungeons & Dragons in 1986 and RuneQuest in 1987, and by original products such as its first role-playing game Ultime épreuve (Jeux actuels, 1983), the Légendes series (Jeux Descartes, 1983), Mega (Jeux & Stratégie, 1984), Empire Galactique (Robert Laffont, 1984), or Rêve de Dragon (Nouvelles Éditions Fantastiques, 1985; English translation Rêve: the Dream Ouroboros by Malcontent Games, 2002).

Traveller was translated into Japanese in 1984, quickly followed by Dungeons & Dragons in 1985.

Translations into Spanish of Dungeons & Dragons (Dalmau Carles Pla, 1985), Call of Cthulhu (Joc Internacional, 1988), RuneQuest (Joc Internacional, 1988), Middle-earth Role-Playing (Joc Internacional, 1989) and Traveller (Diseños Orbitales, 1989) were published in Spain during the 1980s. Spanish speaking countries didn't start their own role-playing games production before the 1990s: Aquelarre (Joc Internacional, 1990) and Mutantes en la sombra (Ludotecnia, 1991) were published in Spain and Laberinto saw publication for the first time in Mexico in 1998 (Gráfica Nueva de Occidente).

The fall of communism allowed the hobby to spread even further. A Polish RPG magazine, Magia i Miecz (Magic and Sword), was published in 1993, and soon several Polish role-playing games followed, with other post-communist countries soon joining in.

== Mid- to late-1990s: TTRPG decline in popularity, early RPG theory ==
=== Rise of role-playing video games and collectible card games ===
Tabletop role-playing games decreased in popularity during the mid-to-late 1990s due to market competition from role-playing video games and collectible card games.

With advances in home computing, role-playing video games increased in popularity. These games, which use settings and game-mechanics found in role-playing games, do not require a gamemaster or for players to remain in-character. Although they helped to introduce new gamers to the hobby, the demands of time and money on players were split between the two.

In 1993, Peter Adkison and Richard Garfield, a doctoral candidate in mathematics at the University of Pennsylvania, released a competitive card collecting game with a fantasy setting reminiscent of fantasy role-playing games called Magic: The Gathering. The game was extremely successful and its publisher Wizards of the Coast (WotC) experienced phenomenal growth. A new genre of collectible card games emerged. The sudden appearance and remarkable popularity of Magic took many gamers (and game publishing companies) by surprise, as they tried to keep pace with fads and changes in the public opinion.

In the year afterwards (1994), Bethesda Softworks released the first chapter in their The Elder Scrolls role-playing video game series. The game was Bethesda's attempt to create a true "pen and paper" style experience for personal computers, with the fifth major game, The Elder Scrolls V: Skyrim (2011) being one of the most frequently released games in the history of the industry.

With gamers' time and money split three ways, the tabletop role-playing game industry declined. Articles appeared in Dragon Magazine and other industry magazines foretelling the "end of role-playing" because face-to-face time was spent playing Magic. TSR's attempts to become a publishing house further drained their reserves of cash and the financially troubled company was eventually purchased by Wizards of the Coast in 1997. Articles criticizing WotC's game in TSR's magazine stopped. WotC became a division of Hasbro in 1998, being bought for an estimated $325 million.

=== Early role-playing game theory ===
Meanwhile, role-playing game theory was developing. In 1994–95 Inter*Active, (later renamed Interactive Fiction) published a magazine devoted to the study of RPGs. In the late 1990s discussion on the nature of RPGs on rec.games.frp.advocacy generated the Threefold Model.

In the Scandinavian RPG scene, several opposing ideological camps about the nature and function of RPGs emerged. Annual academic conferences called the Knutepunkt began in 1997 and continue to today.

== 2000s-early 2010s: Open game license, edition wars, indie TTRPGs, and Old School Renaissance ==
=== Open Game License ===
In 2000, Wizards of the Coast's Dungeons & Dragons brand manager Ryan Dancey introduced a policy whereby other companies could publish D&D-compatible materials under the Open Game License (OGL). He was frustrated that game supplements suffered far more diminished sales over time than the core books required to play the game, then this would spread the cost of supplementing the game and would increase sales of the core books, which could only be published by WotC. The new D&D rules became known as the d20 system, and a System Reference Document was published, containing all the rules needed to write a supplement or run a one-off game, but lacking the character advancement rules necessary for long-term play. The open gaming movement and 3rd/3.5 edition D&D (2000, 2003) enjoyed a great deal of success, and although there was some criticism of the move a great many d20 System games have been released until around 2008.

=== Edition wars ===
In 2009, Pathfinder Roleplaying Game was published by Paizo Publishing, intended for backward compatibility with D&D 3.5 edition ruleset under the OGL. Pathfinder eventually became the top-selling RPG in around 2011 to 2013, replacing Dungeons & Dragons, which had been the best-selling game since the advent of RPG industry in 1974. In comparison, then-4th-edition D&D (2008) proved to be lackluster. WotC quickly responded to this and announced the next edition of D&D with more emphasis on open playtesting and user feedback. "Edition Wars" was a hot topic in the user community and on internet boards.

=== Indie role-playing games ===
Meanwhile, indie role-playing communities arose on the internet. The Forge internet forum studied role-playing and developed the GNS Theory of role-playing games. With the advent of print on demand and PDF publishing, it became possible to produce games with tightly focused designs, eschewing the mainstream trends of the industry.

In 2010, Meguey Baker and Vincent Baker released the game Apocalypse World along with the Powered by the Apocalypse (PbtA) game design framework. PbtA became the blueprint for hundreds of new games with modified game mechanics and a wide variety of settings.

=== Old School Renaissance ===
The OSR (Old School Renaissance, or Revival) also began in this era. It drew inspiration from the early days of tabletop RPGs, especially from earlier editions of D&D. Castles & Crusades (2004), by Troll Lord Games, is a mix between early editions and OGL d20 rules. This in turn inspired the creation of "D&D retro-clones" such as OSRIC (2006), Labyrinth Lord (2007) and Swords & Wizardry (2008), games which more closely recreate the original rule sets, using the OGL materials and non-copyrightable aspects of the older rules.

== mid 2010s-present: TTRPG resurgence in popularity ==
TTRPGs experienced a resurgence in popularity between the mid-2010s and early 2020s. Actual play web series such as Critical Role and The Adventure Zone debuted in the mid-2010s, creating "their own genre of entertainment" and drawing new players to tabletop role-playing games. By 2021, there were hundreds of actual play podcasts.

At the same time, a new generation of indie role-playing games arose, facilitated by e-commerce on Itch.io, DriveThruRPG, Kickstarter, and BackerKit. Crowdfunding in this period provided the funding to produce games such as Avatar Legends, Blades in the Dark, Bluebeard's Bride, Coyote & Crow, Dialect, Dream Askew, Dream Apart, Fall of Magic, Invisible Sun, Jiangshi, Mörk Borg, Star Crossed, Thirsty Sword Lesbians, Visigoths vs. Mall Goths, and Wanderhome.

Online play of TTRPGs through videoconferencing became popular during the COVID-19 pandemic as relief from the isolation of COVID-19 lockdowns.

== See also ==
- History of live action role-playing games
- Play-by-mail game
- Timeline of role-playing games
- List of tabletop role-playing games
- History of video games
