= Computer-assisted gaming =

Computer-assisted gaming (CAG) and computer-assisted wargaming (CAWG) refer to games that are at least partially computerized, but where an important part of the action takes place in real life or on a miniature terrain rather than virtually. Game regulation can be fully computerized or partly managed by a human referee. Computer-assisted gaming seeks to combine the advantages of PC games with those of face-to-face games. In this format, computers are used primarily for recordkeeping and sometimes for resolving combat, while a human referee makes any decisions requiring judgment.

== Variations ==
A computer-assisted game can range from being little more than a collection of rules and notes stored on a computer, to a fully computerized game where a human referee is only needed to make non-random decisions. Such games can be played remotely or with all participants in the same room, viewing one or more computer monitors. (The referee typically has their own monitor; players may share a single monitor, each have their own, or rely on paper while only the referee uses a screen.) This flexibility allows players to combine the best aspects of traditional paper-and-pencil and computer games, tailoring the level of computerization to their preference.

Computer-assisted games are generally not designed to fully recreate the battlefield within computer memory. Instead, the computer acts as a game master by storing game rules and unit (in wargames) or character (in role-playing games) attributes, tracking unit or character status, positions, and distances, animating the game with sounds and voice, and resolving combat (both shooting and close combat). All spatial relationships are tracked on the physical tabletop, while all recordkeeping is managed by the computer.

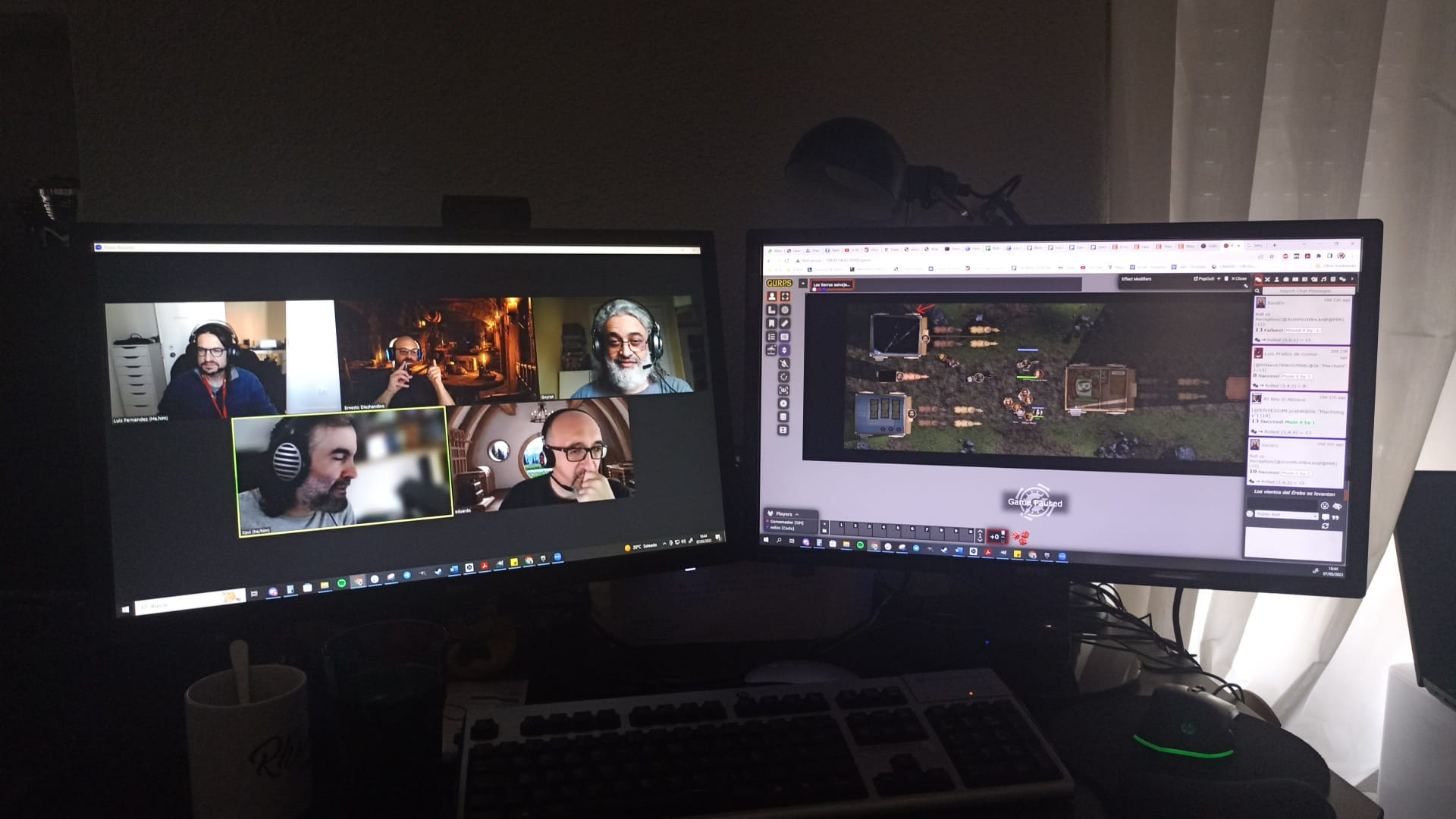
Role-playing game played remotely using the generic Zoom app and the dedicated Foundry Virtual Tabletop app. Although two screens are used in this case, it's more common to use two windows on a single screen or simply use only the features of the dedicated app.

=== Role-playing games ===
Role-playing games were one of the first types of games for which computer-assisted gaming programs were developed. Computer-aided role-playing game programs are designed to help game masters and players alike. Those programs range from acting as convenient format for a character sheet; or other game materials; all the way up to full automation of the game mechanics of a role-playing game system. This is especially useful for character creation/maintenance and rules resolutions for complex simulationist games.

=== Poker ===
There are multiple poker tools that allow players to do statistical analysis of games. An example is a poker calculator, which determines the player's probability of winning, losing, or tying a hand.

=== Tabletop projection ===
Another example of computer-assisted gaming growing in popularity among role-playing game players is the use of a digital projector or flat screen monitors to present maps or other visual elements during game play. These elements may be used on their own, or in concert with miniatures to map out combats, and exploration or to introduce other visual media into the game without resorting to printing or drawing these items.;

=== Webcam data acquisition ===
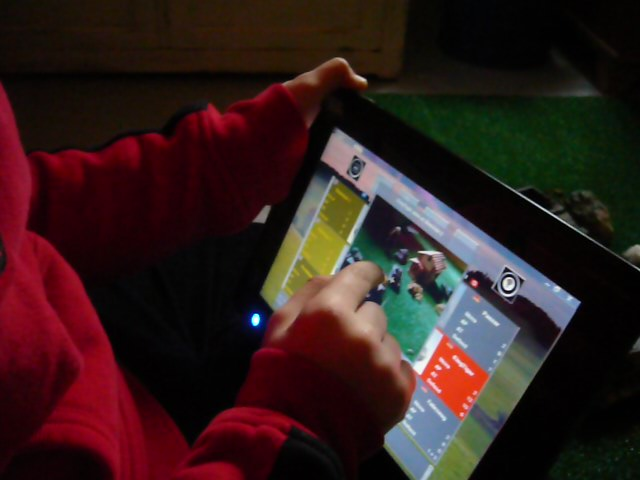
Computer-assisted wargaming using the webcam of a tablet.

Webcam enabled computer-assisted wargames use computer vision to process firing with images of the camera. In the case of an external USB camera, it is placed behind the firing unit selected (third person shooter) in the direction of the target. When a tablet is used the rear webcam is selected. Precise positioning of the webcam behind the shooting unit is not required : it is sufficient both the shooting unit and the target unit are displayed on the captured image for the shot to be valid. This makes the usage of a tablet very practical for these games. Target detection algorithms (improved magic wand contour, polygon simplification, convex hull algorithms, polygon degree of convexity) allow to analyze the characteristics of the target and to estimate the distance to the target. Damage is computed by taking into the account distance (in distance units) between the firing unit and the target, the type of gun (anti-tank value) of the firing unit and the thickness of the armor of the target (defend value).
