= Game theory (disambiguation) =

Game theory is the study of participants' behavior in strategic situations.

Game theory may also refer to:

- Game Theory (band), a 1980s American rock band
- Game Theory (album), a 2006 album by hip-hop band The Roots
- Role-playing game theory
- Game theory on networks, the area of focus within game theory focused on network behavior
- Combinatorial game theory, the study of move combinations in games like nim, chess, and go

== See also ==
- Game studies, the discipline of studying games in the context of entertainment and education
- Game design, the process of designing the rules and content of a game
