= Dragonbane =

LARP project in Sweden

Dragonbane was a large international live action roleplaying game (LARP) project. The game itself took place from July 27 to August 4, 2006 in Älvdalen, Sweden, close to the border with Norway. There were 325 players from several countries. While there was little media coverage in other countries, it received the attention of Scandinavian newspapers and gaming publications.

== The Game ==
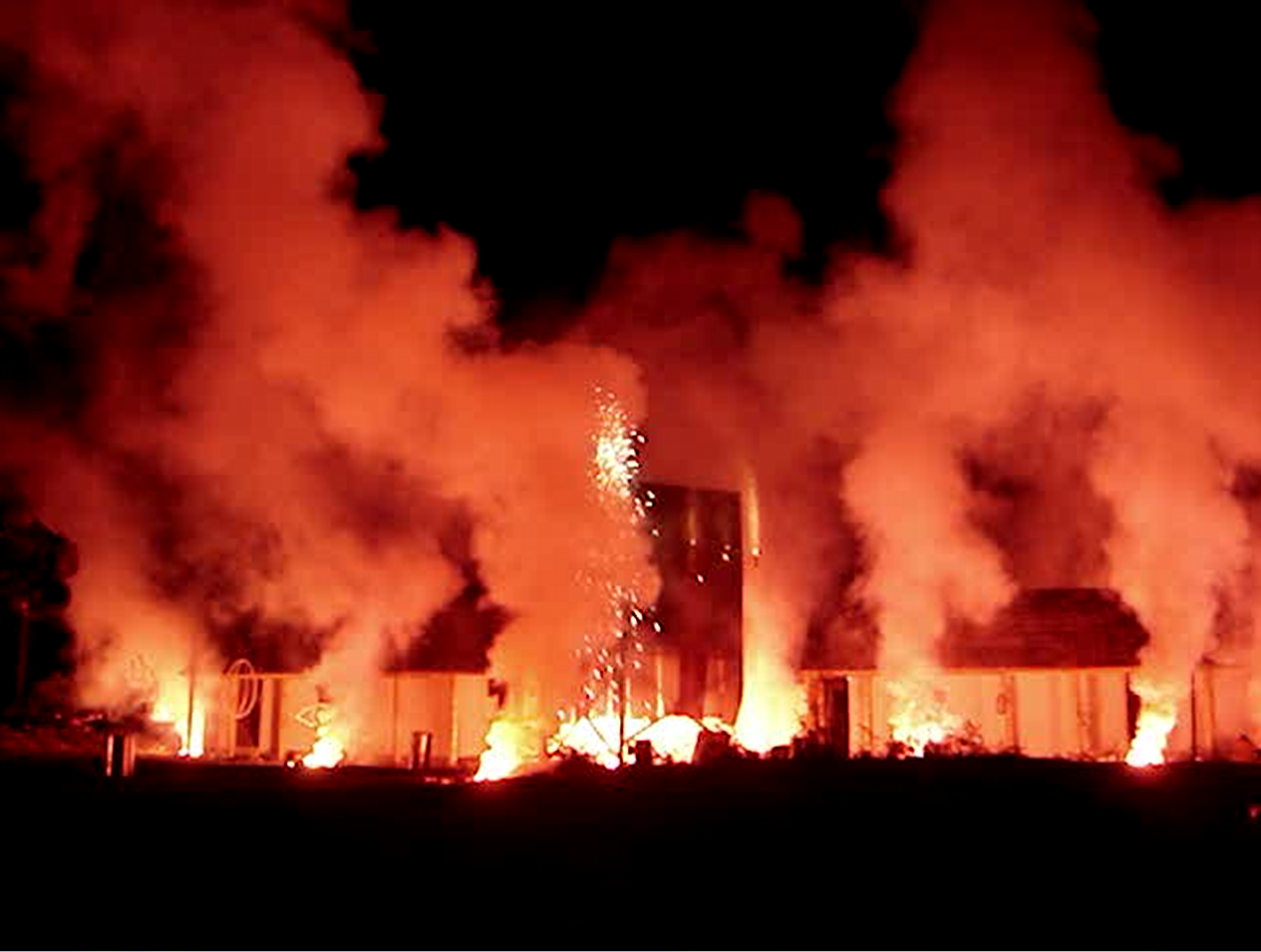
Cinderhill Temple Fireworks

The game events took place in the fictional village of Cinderhill. The game setting was based on the world of Valenor, from Mike Pohjola's game Myrskyn aika (Age of the Storm). The setting mixed influences from the late Iron Age and the Middle Ages. The game aimed for total immersion and there was no out-of-character area.

== Organisation and arrangements ==
Dragonbane was an unusually large LARP project with a budget approaching 1 million euros. Most of the funding came from dozens of corporate sponsors, including several major corporations, such as Hewlett-Packard. An entire village was built for the game, as well as a large electromechanical dragon.

== The village of Cinderhill ==
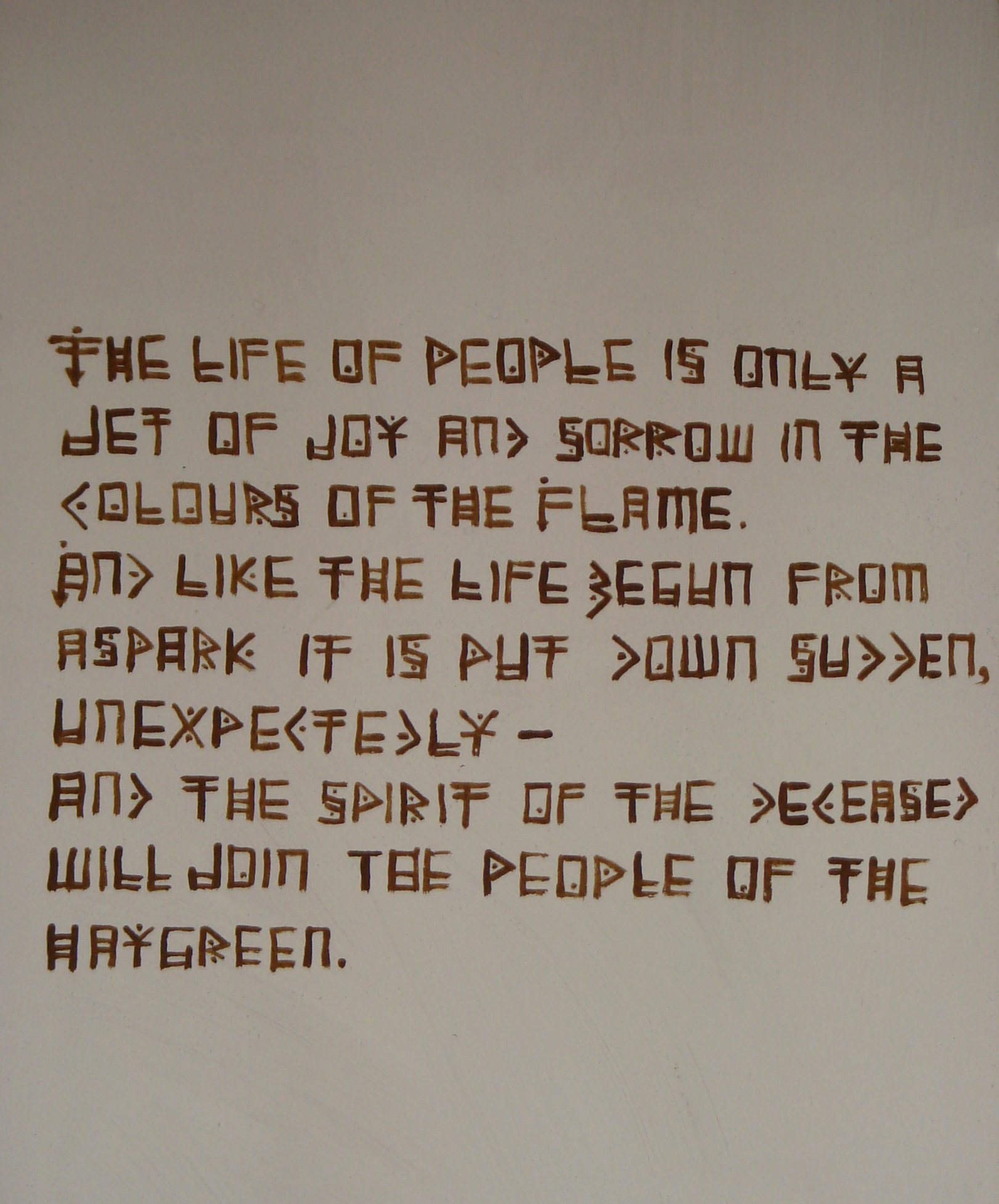
Cinderhill's People's Funeral Speech, written in Cinderhill font

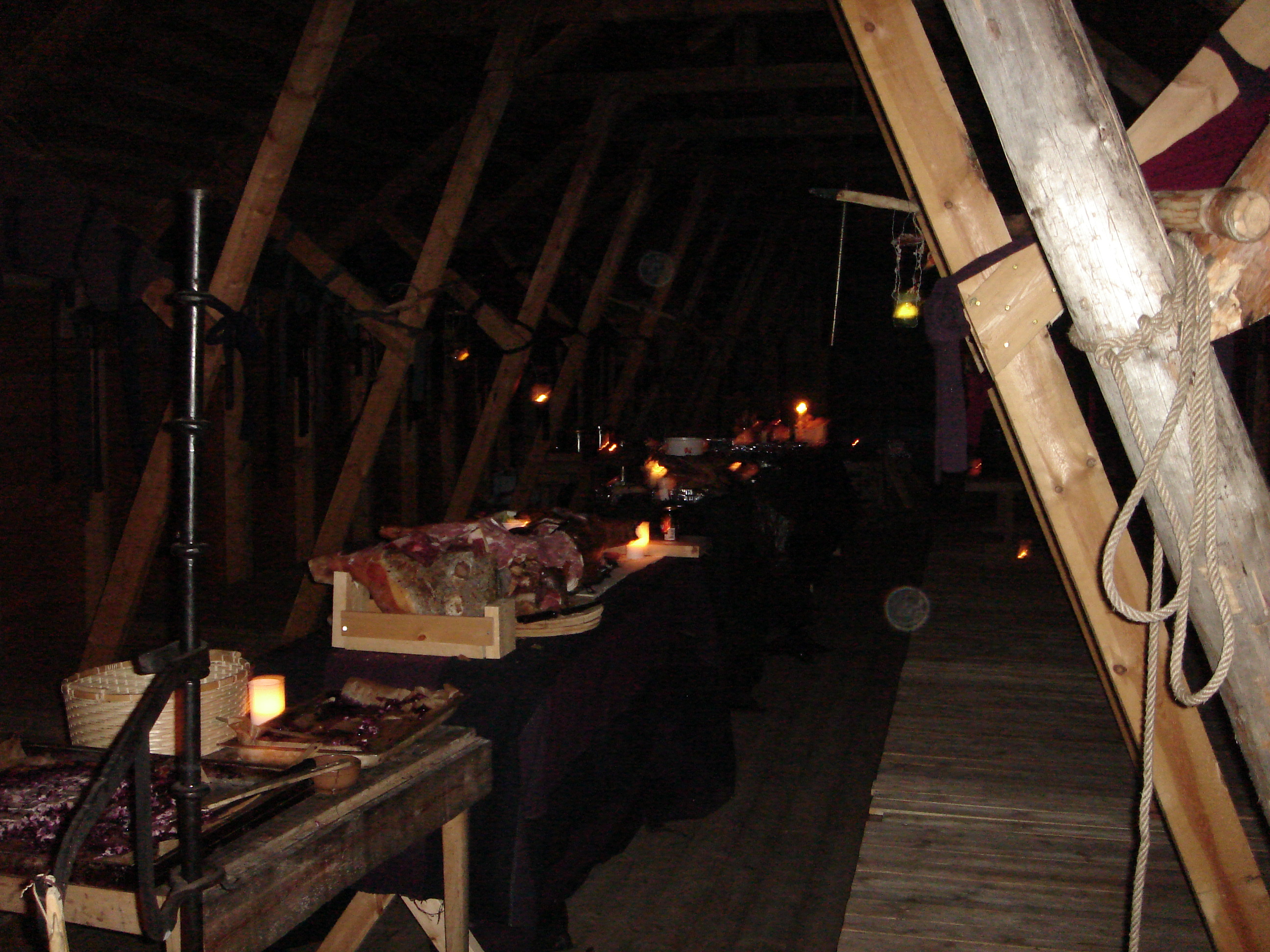
Interior of the Cinderhill Main Long House

A mock medieval village called Cinderhill was constructed for the game, and for future games.

The building of the village begun in spring 2005 and took (a few winter months excluded) until the very day the game began on July 4, 2006.

The Cinderhill village was eventually burnt down in summer 2012, because the land owners did not want to keep it there any longer.

The village contained 4 long houses, a smithy, a bakery, a healer's hut, toilet facilities, wash house, carpentry shop and a grand temple. All in all, there were 12 buildings with 320 indoor sleeping places and a floor area of over 500 square meters. Cinderhill was very much a work in progress, and there were many ideas for other aspects that were not realized.

== Outcome ==
The Dragonbane project was one of the most ambitious in the history of LARP, and some critics expected it would never operate. The originally advertised event in Estonia was postponed and moved to Sweden. Fewer than a third of the 1000 player spaces were filled, but still the project went ahead, and after several preliminary events (to help build the site and establish characters) the 5-day game was run.

Several last-minute technical problems restricted the mobility and articulation of the dragon. Some of the camping areas (outside the village) were reported as inadequately provisioned.

Player response to the event was mixed, dwelling both on the high standards of the immersive environment and on technical and organisational flaws.

The game was billed as a single event, and as yet no plans have been announced for sequels.
