= Myrskyn aika =

Role-playing game

- Myrskyn aika rulebook cover
- Designers: Mike Pohjola
- Publishers: Johnny Kniga Kustannus
- Genres: Fantasy

Myrskyn aika ("The Time of the Storm") is a Finnish role-playing game.

== History ==
In the late 1990s, Mike Pohjola became interested in various theories of the Nordic style of LARPing (Live Action Roleplaying), how it differed from the American style, and how players could better immerse themselves in character roles. He first created .laitos (.institute) in 1997, a dystopian LARP set in an authoritarian future; and Paljon melua tyhjästä (Much Ado About Nothing) in 1998, a retelling of Shakespeare's play using experimental techniques. The latter was what Pohjola would later call his "least successful experiment".

For his next LARP, he turned to Tolkienesque fantasy, creating a world called Valenor for a LARP he titled Myrskyn aika (Time of the Storm). The LARP was set in a land Pohjola described as "an evil empire", where players would take on the roles of rebels fighting for what they perceived as good. Pohjola used several techniques he had gleaned from his earlier LARP experiments.

After running various iterations of this LARP for several years, Pohjola decided to publish Myrskyn aika as a combination role-playing game/LARP in which a simplified rules system would allow character generation and character interaction to be paramount. The result was a three-book set of rules published by Johnny Kniga Publishing in 2003. Although several magazines and newspapers in the large cities of Turku and Helsinki reviewed the books, and sales in those cities were correspondingly good, almost no media in the rest of Finland took notice.

In 2006, Myrskyn aika's setting of Valenor was used as the basis for the Swedish LARP Dragonbane.

Pohjola continued to produce material for the land of Valenor, including several novels and a mass-funded role-playing game/LARP system, Myrskyn sankarit (Heroes of the Storm) in 2013.

== Reception ==
The reviewer for the Helsinki University Roleplaying Club zine Alterations wrote: "I don't see anything ground-breaking about the book combining tabletop and live-action role-playing." But the reviewer found "The format is pleasant and suits me well." The reviewer also lauded the fact that all of the content meant for players was about the setting and the characters; rules were not introduced until the section reserved for the gamemaster.

In the Finnish newspaper Turun Sanomat, Markku Soikkelim called Pohjola "a versatile professional writer" and Myrskyn aika "the first of its kind and a milestone for the Finnish role-playing game hobby." Soikkelim found the game to be "a very thorough and clear presentation of the familiar sword & sorcery fantasy world. Even enthusiasts who have consumed dozens of these types of worlds that adhere to the Tolkien standard can find something to read." He also complimented Pohjola for the emphasis on character creation, saying, "Pohjola not only explains how to create a psychologically challenging role figure but also gives opportunities to do so; Valenor is open to many lifestyles and gender roles." However, he also noted the shortcomings of Myrskyn aika: The lack of an index made finding relevant material very difficult, and the absence of any scenarios forced gamemasters to create all aspects of their adventures.
