= Role-playing game theory =

Scientific study of role-playing games

Role-playing game theory is the study of role-playing games (RPGs) as a social or artistic phenomenon, also known as ludology. RPG theories seek to understand what role-playing games are, how they function, and how the gaming process can be refined in order to improve the play experience and produce better game products.

Notable theories about tabletop role-playing games include the Threefold model and GNS theory, which developed in conversation with the indie role-playing game forum The Forge in the early 2000s. Notable theories about live action role-playing games include the Meilahti School, the Turku School, and Emancipatory Bleed, which developed in conversation with the Knutepunkt convention in Scandinavia.

== Role-playing games ==
Role-playing games are games in which players assume the role of characters in a fictional setting. Role playing games come in various types and categories:

Tabletop role-playing games (TTRPGs)
Players describe their characters' actions through speech. They determine the actions of their characters based on their characterization, and the actions succeed or fail according to a system of rules and guidelines, usually involving randomization.:
Live action role-playing games (LARPs)
Players physically portray their characters, interacting with each other while pursuing goals within a fictional setting represented by real-world environments.:
Online Video and Computer Games (OVCGs)
Players play cooperatively online via large networked servers. Examples include World of Warcraft (Blizzard), Rift (Trion Worlds), and Star Wars: The Old Republic (BioWare).
Collectible strategy game (CSG)
Players play with "collectible material artifacts" such as cards or figurines. Examples include collectible card games such as Magic: The Gathering.

== History ==
=== Early theories ===
The first organized critical reflection and academic research on RPGs from their inception in the mid-1970s through the 1980s focused on examining and refuting the early controversies surrounding the hobby at the time. Arguably, the first examination of the field in clinical terms was Shared Fantasy: Role Playing Games as Social Worlds by Gary Fine. Gary Gygax, a co-originator of the hobby with Dave Arneson, published two books on his philosophy of role-playing: Role Playing Mastery: Tips, Tactics and Strategies in 1989 and Master of the Game in 1990.

In 1994–95 Inter*Active (later renamed Interactive Fiction) published a magazine devoted to the study of RPGs. In the first issue Robin Laws called for the creation of a critical theory for role-playing games. By the late 1990s, discussion on the nature of RPGs on rec.games.frp.advocacy had generated several theories of RPGs which spread to other sites and influenced theorists in France and Scandinavia.

=== The Knutepunkt and The Forge ===
Opposing ideological camps about the nature and function of RPGs emerged in late 1990s Nordic countries. Designers of live action role-playing games in the Nordic LARP tradition began holding a yearly convention called the Knutepunkt that prominently featured RPG theory. The first Knutepunkt was held in Oslo in 1997, and the annual convention is still being organized today.

Around the same time, between 1999 and 2012, an indie role-playing game internet forum called the Forge studied RPG theory with a focus on tabletop games. The Forge's editorial lead, Ron Edwards, developed the GNS Theory of role-playing games.

Ideas from The Forge and Knutepunkt influenced each other over the years. Although the Forge is now defunct, Knutepunkt has continued to grow. Knutepunkt publishes an annual collection of analytical articles on role-playing.

== Notable theories ==
Some RPG theories include:

Threefold Model
Developed at rec.games.frp.advocacy from 1997 to 1998; proposed by Mary Kuhner, and FAQed by John Kim. It hypothesizes that any GM decision will be made for the purpose of game, drama, or simulation. The focus on game, drama, and simulation is why the threefold model is also known as GDS Theory. Thus, player preferences, GMing styles, and even RPG rulesets can be characterised as Game-oriented, Drama-oriented or Simulation-oriented, or more usually as somewhere between the three extremes. This is sometimes called GDS theory. Strictly, GDS theory is concerned with players' social interactions, but it has been extrapolated to direct game design, both in and out of the world of RPGs. A game can be classified according to how strongly it encourages or facilitates players reinforcing behaviors matching each category. Game designers find it useful because it can be used to explain why players play certain games.

GEN Theory
Developed at Gaming Outpost in 2001 largely by Scarlet Jester. It hypothesizes a top and bottom "tier" of play, with the top tier being dominated by "Intent" which is divided into Gamist, Explorative, and Narrative. It was influenced by threefold and GNS theory.

GNS Theory and The Big Model or Forge Theory
Ron Edwards of The Forge developed a variant of the Threefold Model called GNS Theory, then with contributions from other Forge users, developed GNS Theory further into The Big Model between 1999 and 2005. It models roleplaying games as having 4 levels: the social contract, exploration, techniques, and ephemera, with creative agendas governing the link from social contract to technique. In this theory there are 3 kinds of creative agenda: Gamist, Narrativist, and Simulationist (GNS). These theories are detailed in Edwards' articles "GNS and Other Matter of Role Play Theory," "System Does Matter," "Narrativism: Story Now" "Gamism: Step on Up" and "Simulationism: The Right to Dream."

Color Theory
Developed by Fabien Ninoles in 2002, was developed on the French createurs-jdr mailing list. It is an inheritor of SCARF theory and SCAR theory, which then interacted with English language theories. In this theory the goals of system design are thought of as the primary colors of TV light - green for simplicity, blue for realism, and red for consistency. Notions like adaptability, tenacity, brightness, and visibility extend the metaphor.

Channel Theory
Developed by Larry Hols in 2003; hypothesizes that game play is made up of "channels" of various kinds such as "narration," "moral tone" or "fidelity to setting." It developed in part as a criticism of the three style theories.

Wunderkammer-Gesamtkunstwerk (Wu-Ge) Model
Proposed by Lars Konzack of University of Copenhagen as a framework for analysis and design of RPGs, this model examines a role-playing game both as a composite whole (Gesamtkunstwerk) of four art forms: Sub-Creation (setting), Ludus (game system), Performance, and Narrative; and as a "cabinet of curiosities" (Wunderkammer), a metaphor for their capacity to smoothly incorporate any player-suggested concepts into their imaginary space.

The Turku School
Developed in Turku, Finland, especially by Mike Pohjola from 1999 to the present. It advocates immersion ("eläytyminen") as the primary method of role-playing (especially live action role-playing), and artistic exploration as the primary goal. The Immersionist style is thought to be distinct from dramatist, gamist, and simulationist styles, and dramatism and gamism are thought to be clearly inferior styles of role-play, fit only for other mediums besides roleplaying.

The Meilahti School
Developed in Helsinki, Finland, by Jaakko Stenros and Henri Hakkarainen beginning in 2002. It defines role-playing in a way that encompasses many different forms, and shuns normative choices about what the right or best forms are. "A role-playing game is what is created in the interaction between players or between player(s) and gamemaster(s) within a specified diegetic framework."

Design patterns
RPG design patterns, developed by Whitson John Kirk III, is a system of RPG design based on software design patterns, focused on formalizing the mechanics observed in existing pen-and-paper role-playing games in a fashion that is agnostic of mood, genre, or setting.

Emancipatory Bleed
In 2018, Jonaya Kemper coined the term "emancipatory bleed" and developed a theory of how players with marginalized identities can achieve political liberation through embodying imaginary characters in live-action role-playing games.
