= Threefold model =

Role-playing game model

The threefold model or GDS theory of roleplaying games is an attempt to distinguish three different goals in roleplaying. In its original formation, these are: Drama, simulation, and game. It was the inspiration for subsequent theories, such as the GNS theory, which retained a three-way division but altered other aspects of the model.

== The model ==
In its most formal sense, the threefold model claims that any single gamemaster (GM) decision (about the resolution of in-game events) can be made in order to further the goals of drama, simulation, or game. By extension, a series of decisions may be described as tending towards one or two of the three goals, to a greater or lesser extent. This can be visualised as an equilateral triangle, with a goal at each vertex, and the points between them representing different weightings of the different goals. As a consequence, a player or GM can characterise their preferred gaming style as a point on this triangle, or (since no real precision is implied) in words such as "mostly gamist" or "dramatist with a bit of simulationist" or "right in the middle".

Another consequence of the model is the claim that by advancing towards one of the goals, one is moving away from the other two. Thus a game that is highly dramatic will be neither a good simulation nor a challenging game, and so on. This assertion has been widely challenged, and led to criticism of the model.

=== The terms ===
In the terminology of the threefold, the goals of drama, simulation and game have specific meanings.

- Drama is concerned with the narrative qualities of the game, such as story, nuances of meaning, exploration of themes, etc. It does not imply following a preset story, but an eagerness to achieve good or well plotted stories and meaning in the unfolding events.
- Game is concerned with the amount and kind of challenges that the players face in the course of the game. Ideas such as "balance", "fairness" and "victory" belong here.
- Simulation is concerned with the internal consistency of events that unfold in the game world, and ensuring that they are only caused by in-game factors - that is, eliminating metagame concerns (such as drama and game). Simulation is not necessarily concerned with simulating reality; it could be a simulation of any fictional world, cosmology or scenario, according to its own rules.

== History of the threefold model ==
The threefold model was developed through a wide series of discussions during the summer of 1997 in the rec.games.frp.advocacy Usenet group. Mary Kuhner developed many of the key ideas while John H. Kim later organized and expanded the model. The threefold model arose following long arguments and flame-wars about whether one style of roleplaying was "better" than another style. The name was coined by Kuhner, in a July 1997 post which outlined the principles. In October 1998, a "frequently asked questions" (FAQ) document by Kim on the threefold model stated, "An important part of the model is recognising that there are valid different goals for gaming."

It has since then been circulated in a variety of places, including an essay by Petter Bøckman in As Larp Grows Up, a book published as part of the Knudepunkt 2003 LARP festival in Denmark. It was also the inspiration for a related model known as "GNS theory", which has been articulated by Ron Edwards on the roleplaying discussion site The Forge.

== Sources ==
- Kim, John (2008). "The Threefold Model".
- Edwards, Ron (2001). Sorcerer: An Intense Role-Playing Game. Chicago: Adept Press. ISBN 0970917600.
- Torner, Evan; White, William J., eds. (2012). Immersive Gameplay. McFarland. ISBN 978-0786468348.
