= L'Auberge des Derniers Voyageurs =

L'Auberge des Derniers Voyageurs is a 1987 role-playing game supplement published by Ludodélire for Rêve de Dragon.

== Contents ==
L'Auberge des Derniers Voyageurs is a supplement in which the eerie Inn of the Last Travellers is introduced as a launchpad for adventure and entrapment, alongside optional rules for the grey dream and insights into the dark way of Thanatos.

== Reviews ==
- Casus Belli #43
- Jeux & Stratégie #50
