= Age of the Tempest =

Tabletop role-playing game

The cover of Age of the Tempest – Sword of the High King

Age of the Tempest (Finnish: Myrskyn sankarit; formerly titled Heroes of the Storm in English) is a tabletop role-playing game, designed by Mike Pohjola and published by the board game company Tactic. The first part, Heroes of the Storm – Sword of the Great King was published in 2013 and retitled into Age of the Tempest – Sword of the High King in May 2014. Age of the Tempest – Sword of the High King (translated by Ville-Eemeli Miettinen) is about forest-dwelling rebels, who fight against the troops of the evil dictator.

The role-playing game was first published in Finland in Finnish, and later internationally in English, initially as Heroes of the Storm, and finally as Age of the Tempest. The role-playing game is published as a boxed set, and is available in Finland in book stores, department stores and hypermarkets, as well as traditional gaming stores. International distribution will take most of 2013.

The game was crowdfunded in 2012 with a campaign that gathered gamers both from Finland and all over the world.

== Trademark dispute ==
In October 2013, when the game was titled Heroes of the Storm, video game company Blizzard Entertainment changed the title of its upcoming video game to Heroes of the Storm, causing a dispute about the trademark. According to the trademark database TMview, provided by the European trademark registry OHIM, Blizzard applied for an EU-wide Community trade mark in September 2013, which was registered in February 2014, whereas Mike Pohjola applied for a Finnish trademark in October 2013. In May 2014, the role-playing game changed its name to Age of the Tempest and Pohjola's trademark application was withdrawn.
