= Computerize =

Computerize or computerization may refer to:

- Equipping with a general purpose computer, embedded computer, or computer system
- Equipping something with or the usage of software
- Business process reengineering that converts a manual process into one done by a computer
- Digital transformation of a service or business
- Inputting data (computing) into computers
- Digitizing information for computers
- Creating computer-generated content

== See also ==
- Automation
