= Tignous =

French cartoonist (1957 – 2015)

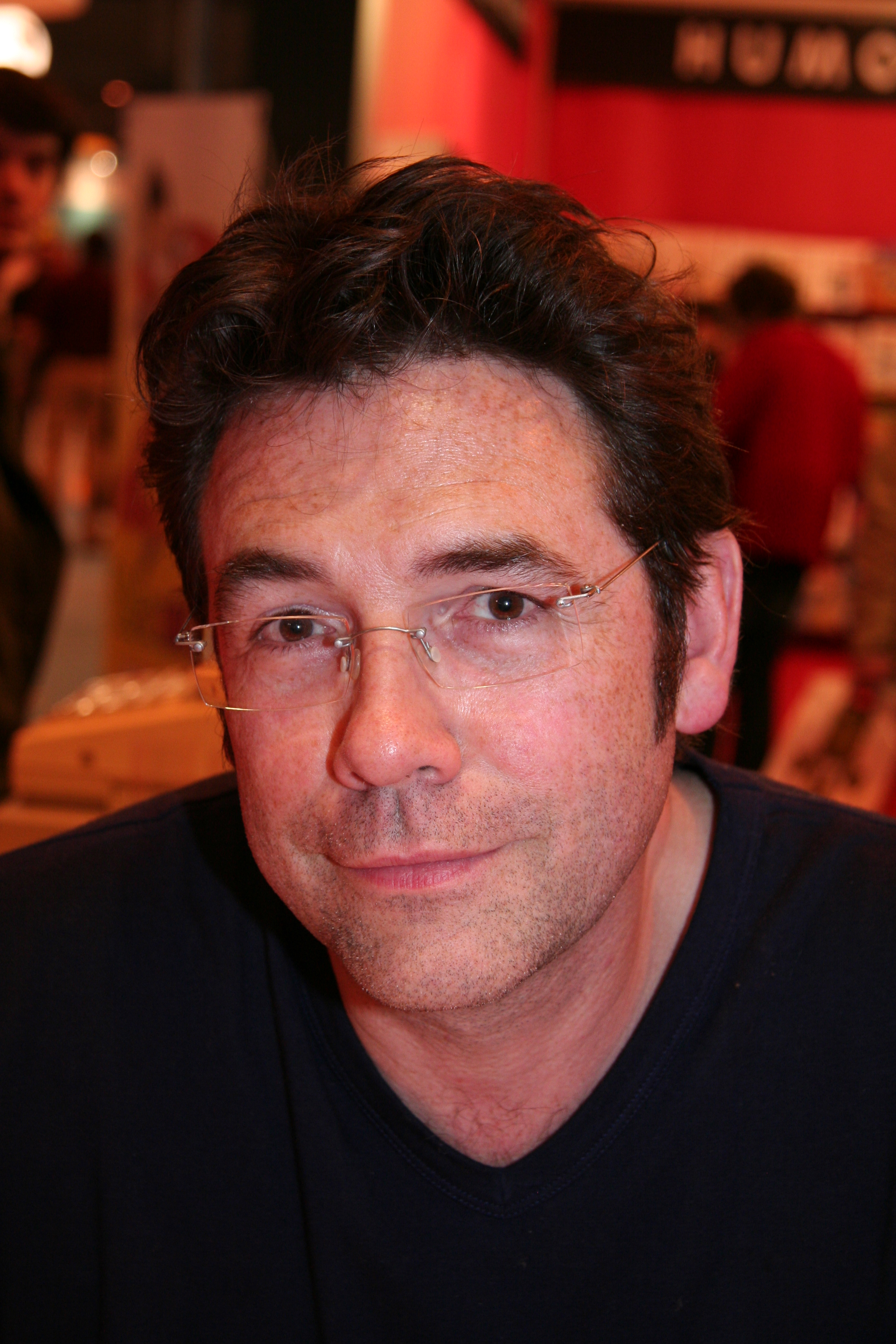
- Tignous in 2008
- Born: Bernard Jean-Charles Verlhac; 1 January 1957 Paris, France
- Died: 7 January 2015 (aged 57) Paris, France
- Area: Cartoonist
- Pseudonym: Tignous
- Children: 4

Signature
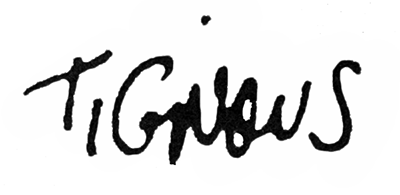

Bernard Jean-Charles Verlhac (21 August 1957 – 7 January 2015), known by the pseudonym Tignous (French pronunciation: [tiɲus], from Occitan: Tinhós), was a French cartoonist. He was a long-time staff cartoonist for the French satirical magazine Charlie Hebdo.

On 7 January 2015, Tignous was killed in the Charlie Hebdo shooting.

== Biography ==
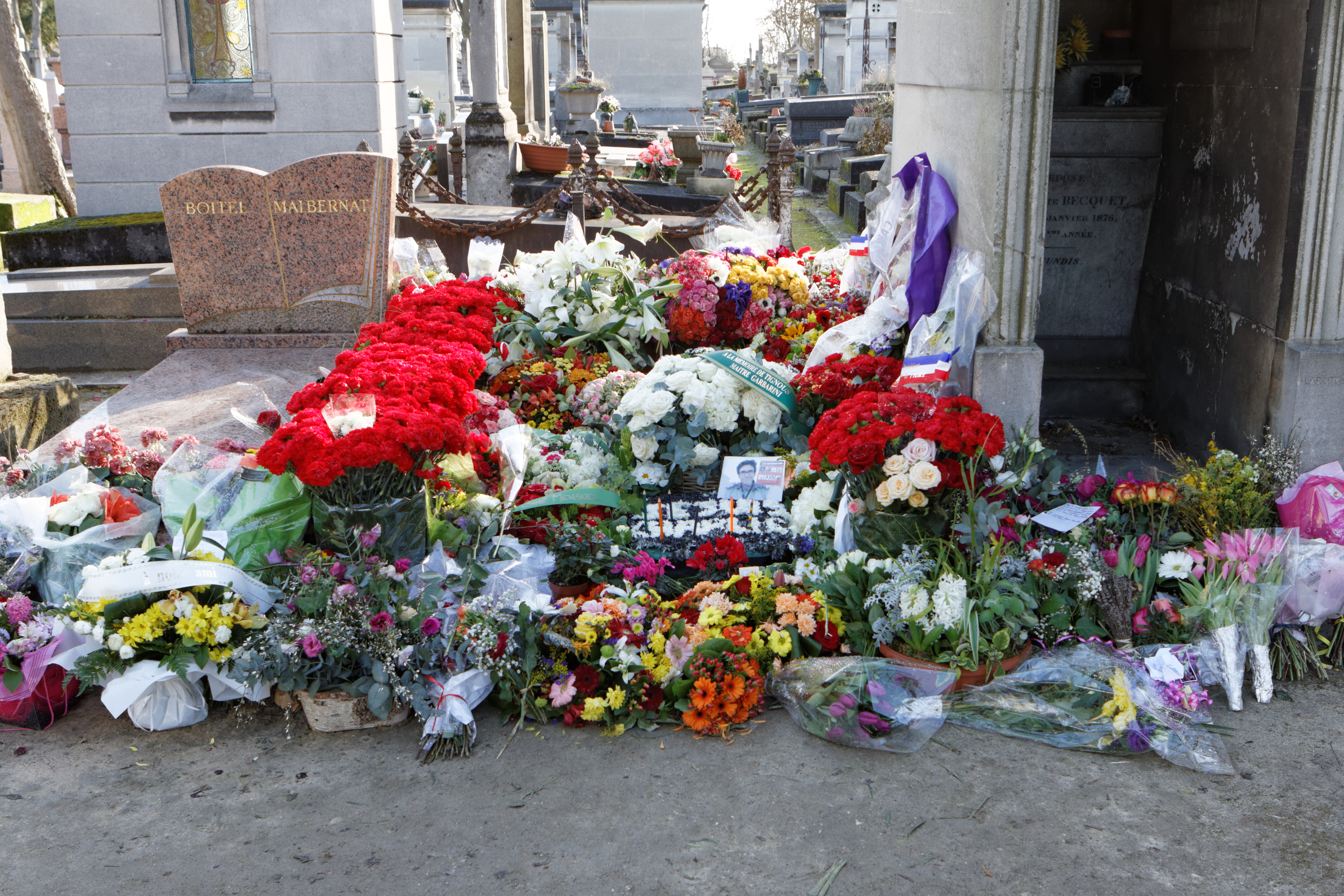
Père Lachaise Cemetery

Tignous was born in Paris on 21 August 1957. He studied drawing at the École Boulle. After working in the comic book field, Tignous began doing cartoons for L'Idiot International, La Grosse Bertha, and L'Événement du jeudi.

Tignous first began working at Charlie Hebdo in 1980, and then rejoined the weekly when it was reborn in 1992. He was also a contributor to the weekly news magazine Marianne and the monthly publication Fluide Glacial. In addition, he drew for Télérama and L'Echo des Savanes.

Tignous was also active in the French role-playing world, with his illustrations featured in games like Rêve de Dragon and MEGA, and many illustrations for the magazine Casus Belli. His work features in a 2015 cooperative card game, Les Poilus (The Grizzled), about the tragic and solitary experience of French soldiers in the trenches of the Great War.

Tignous was a member of Cartoonists for Peace as well as the Press Judiciare, an association of French journalists covering the legal system. He was one of the founding sponsors of Clowns sans Frontieres, the French affiliate of Clowns without Borders International, and participated in CSF projects in the Philippines, Burma, and Nord Pas de Calais. In 2010, he published a book featuring cartoons of his signature pandas to benefit the French chapter of the World Wildlife Foundation, which called him "a friend of the pandas and the earth."

Tignous was the father of four children. He was buried in Père Lachaise Cemetery on 15 January 2015. The Franco-Lebanese jazz trumpeter Ibrahim Maalouf played during a ceremony in Tignous's honour held in the great hall of the municipality of Montreuil, Seine-Saint-Denis.

== Works ==
- 1991: On s'énerve pour un rien
- 1999: Tas de riches
- 2006: Le Sport dans le sang
- 2008: C'est la faute à la société
- 2008: Le Procès Colonna
- 2010: Pandas dans la brume
- 2010: Le Fric c'est capital
- 2011: 5 ans sous Sarkozy

== See also ==
- List of journalists killed in Europe
