= Empire Galactique =

- Publisher: Jeux Robert Laffont

Empire Galactique is a role-playing game first published by Jeux Robert Laffont in 1984.

== Contents ==
Empire Galactique is a game set in a galaxy spanning empire in the 116th century.

== Reviews ==
- Jeux & Stratégie #31
- Backstab #2
- Casus Belli #23
- Casus Belli #26
- Casus Belli #43
