= Computer-generated =

Computer-generated usually refers to a sound or visual that has been created in whole or in part with the aid of computer software or computer hardware.

Computer-generated may refer to:

- Computer animation
- Computer art
- Computer graphics
- Computer-generated holography
- Computer-generated imagery (CGI)
- Computer-generated music
