= Rêve de Dragon =

Fantasy role-playing game

- Cover of 1st edition, 1985
- Designers: Denis Gerfaud
- Illustrators: Jean-Charles Rodriguez; Roger Ronsin; Bernard Verlhac
- Publishers: Nouvelles Éditions Fantastiques
- Publication: 1985 (1st edition) (French only); 1993 (2nd edition)
- Genres: Fantasy

Rêve de Dragon (French: Dream of the Dragon) is a medieval fantasy role-playing game published by Nouvelles Éditions Fantastiques (NEF) in France in 1985, in which dragons, dreaming together, have created a world in their dreams as well as the characters that explore this world.

== Description ==
Rêve de Dragon posits that each player character is created in the dreams of a sleeping dragon, and that many dragons, while dreaming together, have created an entire imaginary world in which their characters live. From adventure to adventure, the dreams change, bringing new worlds with new physical laws and new customs. Some powerful characters, known as Hauts-Rêvants (High Dreamers) can affect the dragons' dreams, and thus change the world. If a dragon awakens, the character which had been created in its dreams dies.

The first edition consists of two 80-page softcover books encased in a folder that serves as a gamemaster's screen:

=== Book I: L'Aventure (The Adventure) ===
This book sets out the mechanics of the game in six parts:

1. Character creation: There are no character classes. Instead, each player buys various skills using a point-buy system to bring the character to life.
2. Game rules, including the effect of astrology on a character's luck.
3. Combat: Critic Dave Nalle called this "detailed and fairly realistic, using a modifier system."
4. Medicine
5. Equipment
6. Creatures, encounters, traps and poisons

=== Book II: La Rêve (The Dream) ===
This book explains magic and wizards. Magic is divided into four schools, each named after a powerful Haut-Rêvant: Hypnos (nature and illusion), Oneiros (enchantment), Narcos (rituals), and Thanatos (summoning and spirit magic).

The book also includes an introductory scenario.

== Publication history ==
Logo of the first edition, 1985

French game designer Denis Gerfaud was influenced by the 1980 novel Les Hautes Terres du rêve ("The High Dreamland"), a fantasy novel by Jacques Sadoul. Gerfaud subsequently created Rêve de Dragon, which was then published in France by NEF in 1985, with art by Jean-Charles Rodriguez, Roger Ronsin, and Bernard Verlhac. It was one of the first role-playing games designed and published in France. It proved popular, and the supplement L'Auberge des Derniers Voyageurs was published in 1987, as well as several adventures.

A second edition, illustrated by Florence Magnin, was published by Multisim in 1993. A third edition was published in 2018.

An English translation titled Rêve: the Dream Ouroboros was published by Malcontent Games in 2006.

== Reception ==
In Issue 44 of Abyss, Dave Nalle found that "On the whole, the first book is interesting. It is a relatively advanced game, in the tradition of Dungeons & Dragons, but with a workable although somewhat limited skill system and not too much added complexity." Although Nalle pointed out "There are an awful lot of modifiers to be considered in combat", he liked the "information on the design of some fairly inventive traps and poisons." The second book about magic is where Nalle thought this game shone, writing "Like Ars Magica. it is a game which emphasizes magic and the supernatural very heavily, though it does it considerably more creatively." Nalle concluded, "Rêve de Dragon is a fascinating game. While a lot of the mechanics don't appeal to me ... what does appeal to me is the basic background idea and the detail and variety which has gone into developing the magic system."

In Issue 28 of the French games magazine Casus Belli, A.R. Thigel commented, "The rules are clear, original, consistent, and above all, the fundamentals of the magic are explained, so we know why it is the way it is. The general rules are, as mentioned above, numerous and detailed." Thigel concluded, "What else can be said about this role-playing game, except that it's in French, and even in good French, and that humor is very present."

In a retrospective review written in 2001, 15 years after the game's original publication, the French magazine Backstab noted "First released in 1984, Rêve de Dragon immediately captivated an audience that preferred travel and open-ended plots to the sticky dampness of rigidly laid-out dungeons. But what truly stands out are the scenarios written by Denis Gerfaud, true gems of bawdy humor and poetry. Coupled with a very fun system, widely copied since, Rêve de Dragon is now published by Multisim and remains a must-have, accessible to all travellers."

In Issue 16 of the Spanish magazine Lider, Ricard Ibáñez wrote, "Reve de Dragón is one of those role-playing games that is pure poetry. Its game system is somewhat dense, but both the game's philosophy and the modules (released regularly, all signed by the author) are excellent. Without a doubt, the best French medieval fantasy game."

== Reviews ==
- Casus Belli (Issue 32 - Apr 1986)
- Jeux & Stratégie #36
