= Mike Pohjola =

Finnish writer and game designer

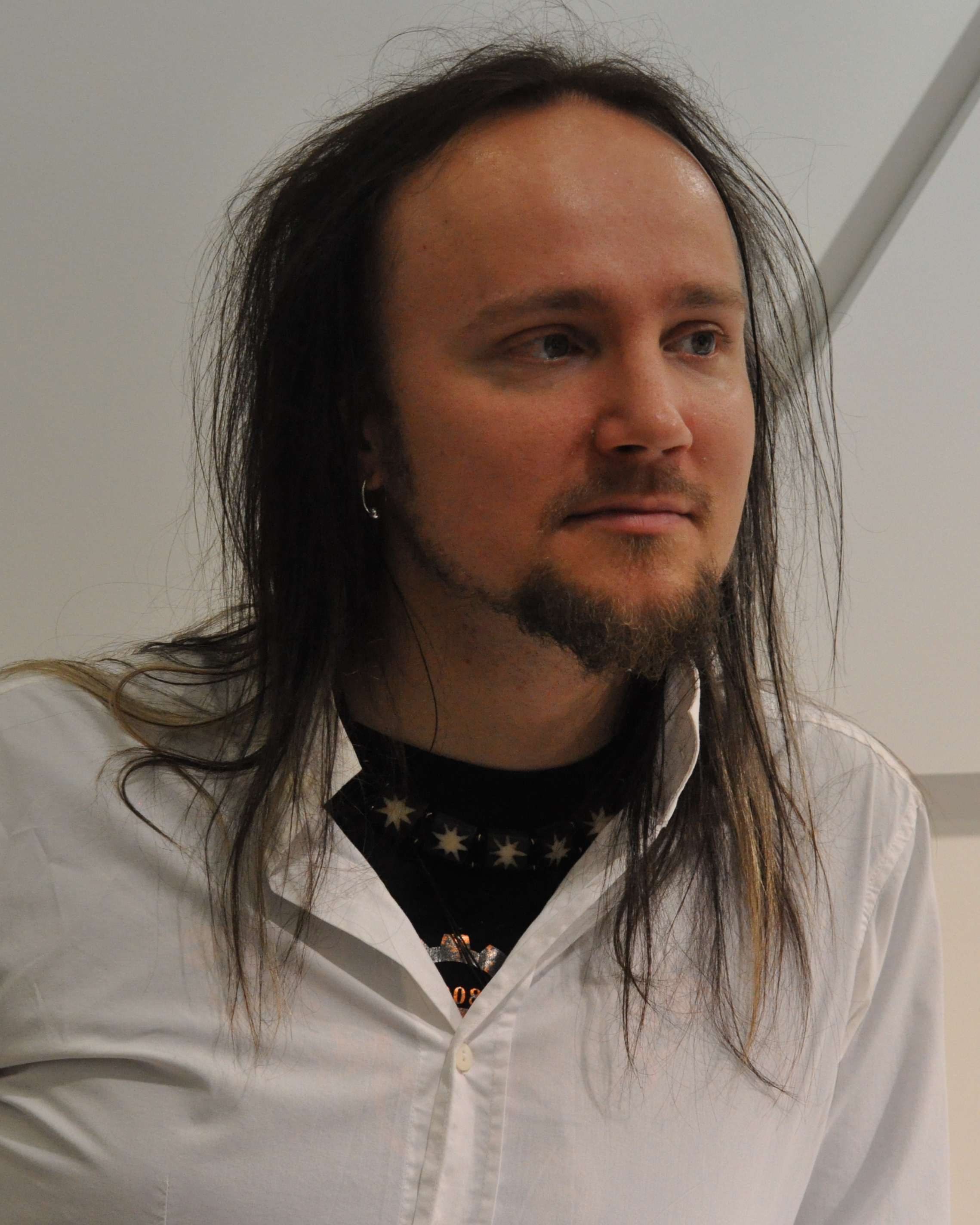
Mike Pohjola in 2011

Mikko "Mike" Pohjola (born 15 October 1978) is a Finnish playwright, novelist, and game designer. He is the author of Sinä vuonna 1928, 1827, Maailman hauskin, Myrskyn aika, Star Wreck Roleplaying Game, Tähti, Kadonneet kyyneleet, Ihmisen poika, and Age of the Tempest. He is also the narrative designer and main writer of the Agemonia board game.

He is the chairman of Helsinki City Theatre, and was on the board of the Olympic Stadium and the Helsinki Philharmonic Orchestra.

In Nordic live action role-playing (larp) circles, he is known as the author of "the Manifesto of the Turku School" (2000), advocating immersive gaming, as the designer of several experimental larps, and as the author of several published roleplaying books. Several of Pohjola's artistic and theoretical articles have been published in journals and magazines in Europe and the United States. He has often written about character immersion, rituals, theatre, and identity.

Pohjola's first novel, Kadonneet kyyneleet was published in the summer of 2008. Since then, he has written several historical novels and some books for younger readers.

== Games ==
As author

- Myrskyn aika, 2003, Johnny Kniga Publishing
- Star Wreck Roleplaying Game, 2006, Energia Productions
- Tähti, 2007, Riimuahjo Publishing
- Age of the Tempest, 2013, Tactic

As a narrative designer and lead writer

- Agemonia, 2024, Lautapelit.fi

As contributor

- Book of LARP, 2003, Interactivities Ink
- As Larp Grows Up, 2003, Projektgruppen KP03
- Beyond Role and Play, 2004, Ropecon ry.
- Dissecting Larp, 2005
- Larp Realia, 2016
- Once Upon A Nordic Larp, 2017
- Liminal Encounters, 2024

== Novels ==
- Kadonneet kyyneleet, 2008, Gummerus Kustannus Oy
- Sanaleikkikirja, 2008, Gummerus Kustannus Oy
- Ihmisen poika, 2011, Gummerus Kustannus Oy
- 1827, 2016, Gummerus Kustannus Oy
- Sinä vuonna 1918, 2018, Gummerus Kustannus Oy
- Maailman hauskin, 2021, Tammi
- Maailman hauskin ja liian suuri suu, 2023, Tammi
