= Rêve: the Dream Ouroboros =

Fantasy role-playing game

- Cover of the English edition of Rêve
- Designers: Denis Gerfaud
- Publishers: Malcontent Games
- Publication: 2006
- Genres: Fantasy
- Systems: Custom

Rêve: the Dream Ouroboros is fantasy role-playing game published by Malcontent Games in 2006 that is based upon the best-selling French role-playing game Rêve de Dragon ("Dream of the Dragon").

== Description ==
Rêve: the Dream Ouroboros posits that each player character is created in the dreams of a sleeping dragon, and that many dragons, while dreaming together, have created an entire imaginary world in which their characters live. From adventure to adventure, the dreams change, bringing new worlds with new physical laws and new customs. Some powerful characters, known as High Dreamers can affect the dragons' dreams, and thus change the world. If a dragon awakens, the character which had been created in its dreams dies.

A character is mainly defined by 14 attributes which range from 6 to 15 at the creation time (the values can rise to 21 for a human), and a wide set of skills which range from -11 to +11.

The simulation system uses a resolution table: a percentage is determined from the value of an attribute, and of a skill affected by a difficulty level.

During the adventure, the character gains stress points. These stress points are converted into experience points when dreaming at night (by a dream test): the character dreams about his past incarnations, and thus can raise his attributes and skills (he remembers past skills). In particular circumstances (special result on the dream test), the character can meet a dragon during his dream; the exceptional event can bring beneficial or traumatic results.

== Publication history ==
French game designer Denis Gerfaud was influenced by the 1980 novel Les Hautes Terres du rêve ("The High Dreamland"), a fantasy novel by Jacques Sadoul. Gerfaud subsequently created Rêve de Dragon, which was then published in France by Nouvelles Éditions Fantastiques in 1985. An English translation titled Rêve: the Dream Ouroboros was published by Malcontent Games first in 2002 as a three-book set, and then as a single book in 2006.

== See also ==
- Ouroboros
