= GNS theory =

Role-playing game theory

GNS theory is an informal field of study developed by Ron Edwards which attempts to create a unified theory of how role-playing games work. Focused on player behavior, in GNS theory participants in role-playing games organize their interactions around three categories of engagement: Gamism, Narrativism and Simulation.

The theory focuses on player interaction rather than statistics, encompassing game design beyond role-playing games. Analysis centers on how player behavior fits the above parameters of engagement and how these preferences shape the content and direction of a game. GNS theory is used by game designers to dissect the elements which attract players to certain types of games.

== History ==
GNS theory was inspired by the threefold model idea, from discussions on the rec.games.frp.advocacy group on Usenet in summer 1997. The Threefold Model defined drama, simulation and game as three paradigms of role-playing. The name "Threefold Model" was coined in a 1997 post by Mary Kuhner outlining the theory. Kuhner posited the main ideas for theory on Usenet, and John H. Kim later organized the discussion and helped it grow.

In his article "System Does Matter", which was first posted to the website Gaming Outpost in July 1999, Ron Edwards wrote that all RPG players have at least one of three perspectives. According to Edwards, enjoyable RPGs focus on one perspective and a common error in RPG design is to try to cater all three types simultaneously. His article could be seen as a warning against generic role-playing game systems from large developers. Edwards connected GNS theory to game design, which helped to popularize the theory. On December 2, 2005, Edwards closed the forums on the Forge about GNS theory, saying that they had outlived their usefulness.

== Aspects ==
=== Gamism ===
A gamist makes decisions to satisfy predefined goals in the face of adversity: to win. Edwards wrote,

I might as well get this over with now: the phrase "Role-playing games are not about winning" is the most widespread example of synecdoche in the hobby. Potential Gamist responses, and I think appropriately, include:

"Eat me,"
(upon winning) "I win," and

"C'mon, let's play without these morons."

These decisions are most common in games pitting characters against successively-tougher challenges and opponents, and may not consider why the characters are facing them in the first place. Gamist RPG design emphasizes parity; all player characters should be equally strong and capable of dealing with adversity.

Combat and diversified options for short-term problem solving (for example, lists of specific spells or combat techniques) are frequently emphasized. Randomization provides a gamble, allowing players to risk more for higher stakes rather than modelling probability.

=== Narrativism ===
Narrativism relies on outlining (or developing) character motives, placing characters into situations where those motives conflict and making their decisions the driving force. For example, a samurai sworn to honor and obey his lord might be tested when directed to fight his rebellious son; a compassionate doctor might have his charity tested by an enemy soldier under his care; or a student might have to decide whether to help her best friend cheat on an exam.

This has two major effects. Characters usually change and develop over time, and attempts to impose a fixed storyline are impossible or counterproductive. Moments of drama (the characters' inner conflict) make player responses difficult to predict, and the consequences of such choices cannot be minimized. Revisiting character motives or underlying emotional themes often leads to escalation: asking variations of the same "question" at higher intensity levels.

=== Simulationism ===
Simulationism is a playing style recreating, or inspired by, a genre or source. Its major concerns are internal consistency, analysis of cause and effect and informed speculation. Characterized by physical interaction and details of setting, simulationism shares with narrativism a concern for character backgrounds, personality traits and motives to model cause and effect in the intellectual and physical realms.

Simulationist players consider their characters independent entities, and behave accordingly; they may be reluctant to have their character act on the basis of out-of-character information. Similar to the distinction between actor and character in a film or play, character generation and the modeling of skill growth and proficiency can be complex and detailed.

Many simulationist RPGs encourage illusionism (manipulation of in-game probability and environmental data to point to predefined conclusions) to create a story. Call of Cthulhu recreates the horror and humanity's cosmic insignificance in the Cthulhu Mythos, using illusionism to craft grisly fates for the players' characters and maintain consistency with the source material.

Simulationism maintains a self-contained universe operating independent of player will; events unfold according to internal rules. Combat may be broken down into discrete, semi-randomised steps for modeling attack skill, weapon weight, defense checks, armor, body parts and damage potential. Some simulationist RPGs explore different aspects of their source material, and may have no concern for realism; Toon, for example, emulates cartoon hijinks. Role-playing game systems such as GURPS and Fudge use a somewhat-realistic core system which can be modified with sourcebooks or special rules.

== Terminology ==
GNS theory incorporates Jonathan Tweet's three forms of task resolution which determine the outcome of an event. According to Edwards, an RPG should use a task-resolution system (or combination of systems) most appropriate for that game's GNS perspective. The task-resolution forms are:

- Drama/destiny: Participants decide the results, with plot requirements the determining factor (for example, Houses of the Blooded).
- Fortune/chance: Chance decides the results (for example, dice).
- Karma/fate: A fixed value decides the results (for example, Nobilis' statistics comparison. Jenna K. Moran's work frequently takes inspiration from software development methodologies).

Edwards has said that he changed the name of the Threefold Model's "drama" type to "narrativism" in GNS theory to avoid confusion with the "drama" task-resolution system.

GNS theory identifies five elements of role-playing:

- Character: A fictional person
- Color: Details providing atmosphere
- Setting: Location in space and time
- Situation: The dilemma
- System: Determines how in-game events unfold

It details four stances the player may take in making decisions for their character:

- Actor: Decides based on what their character wants and knows
- Author: Decides based on what they want for their character, retrospectively explaining why their character made a decision
- Director: Makes decisions affecting the environment instead of a character (usually represented by a gamemaster in an RPG)
- Pawn: Decides based on what they want for their character, without explaining why their character made a decision

== Criticism ==
Brian Gleichman, a self-identified Gamist whose works Edwards cited in his examination of Gamism, wrote an extensive critique of the GNS theory and the Big Model. He states that although any RPG intuitively contains elements of gaming, storytelling, and self-consistent simulated worlds, the GNS theory "mistakes components of an activity for the goals of the activity", emphasizes player typing over other concerns, and assumes "without reason" that there are only three possible goals in all of role-playing. Combined with the principles outlined in "System Does Matter", this produces a new definition of RPG, in which its traditional components (challenge, story, consistency) are mutually exclusive, and any game system that mixes them is labeled as "incoherent" and thus inferior to the "coherent" ones. To disprove this, Gleichman cites a survey conducted by Wizards of the Coast in 1999, which identified four player types and eight "core values" (instead of the three predicted by the GNS theory) and found that these are neither exclusive, nor strongly correlated with particular game systems. Gleichman concludes that the GNS theory is "logically flawed", "fails completely in its effort to define or model RPGs as most people think of them", and "will produce something that is basically another type of game completely".

Gleichman also states that just as the Threefold Model (developed by self-identified Simulationists who "didn't really understand any other style of player besides their own") "uplifted" Simulation, Edwards' GNS theory "trumpets" its definition of Narrativism. According to him, Edwards' view of Simulationism as "'a form of retreat, denial, and defense against the responsibilities of either Gamism or Narrativism'" and characterization of Gamism as "being more akin to board games" than to RPGs, reveals an elitist attitude surrounding the narrow GNS definition of narrative role-playing, which attributes enjoyment of any incompatible play-style to "'[literal] brain damage'". Lastly, Gleichman states that most games rooted in the GNS theory, e.g. My Life with Master and Dogs in the Vineyard, "actually failed to support Narrativism as a whole, instead focusing on a single Narrativist theme", and have had no commercial success.

Fantasy author and Legend of the Five Rings contributor Marie Brennan reviews the GNS theory in the eponymous chapter of her 2017 non-fiction book Dice Tales. While she finds many of its "elaborations and add-ons that accreted over the years... less than useful", she suggests that the "core concepts of GNS can be helpful in elucidating some aspects of [RPGs], ranging from game design to the disputes that arise between players". A self-identified Narrativist, Brennan finds Edwards' definition of said creative agenda ("exploration of theme") too narrow, adding "character development, suspense, exciting plot twists, and everything else that makes up a good story" to the Narrativist priorities list. She concludes that rather than being a practical guide, GNS is more useful for explaining the general ideas of role-playing and especially "for understanding how gamers behave".

The role-playing game historian Shannon Appelcline (author of Designers & Dragons) drew parallels between three of his contemporary commercial categories of RPG products and the three basic categories of GNS. He posited that "OSR games are largely gamist and indie games are largely narrativist", while "the mainstream games... tend toward simulationist on average", and cautiously concluded that this "makes you think that Edwards was on to something".

Noted participant of the Forge, contributor to GNS theory, and developer of many role-playing games, Vincent Baker, has said that "the model is obsolete," and discussed that trying to fit play into the boxes provided by the model may contribute to misunderstanding it.

== See also ==
- Bartle taxonomy of player types
- Gamification
