= Knutepunkt =

Nordic annual role-playing game conference

The Knutepunkt is an annual role-playing game conference held annually in the Nordic countries since 1997. It has been a vital institution in establishing a Nordic role-playing identity, and in establishing the concept of "Nordic larp" as a unique approach. Though the conference started out strictly as a Live action role-playing (larp for short) event, it has since embraced role-playing games in a more general fashion. Today the conference still has an emphasis on larp, but programs devoted to traditional tabletop role-playing as well as newer arrivals such as freeform are common.

A live action role-playing avant-garde movement, which pursues radical experimentation and the recognition of role-playing as a form of art, has been connected to the Knutepunkt conferences. The scope of the Knutepunkt conference has expanded rather rapidly over the last few years with participants showing up from numerous non-Scandinavian countries. Since about 2003 Knutepunkt has seen participants from the United States, Germany, France, Poland, Italy, Russia, Estonia, Belarus, Belgium, the Netherlands, Israel, Czech Republic, United Kingdom and Austria, among others.

== Name ==
Knutepunkt is Norwegian for "meeting point" or "knot point" as it can be directly translated as, and locally the term is translated into Swedish Knutpunkt, Danish Knudepunkt and Finnish Solmukohta. The name of the convention refers to the point where two pieces of rope or string joins in a knot, and varies with the organizing country.

== History ==
The organising country changes each year in this order: Norway, Sweden, Denmark and Finland.

Event	Location	Notes
Knutepunkt 1997	Oslo, Norway	
Knutpunkt 1998	Stockholm, Sweden	
Knudepunkt 1999	Copenhagen, Denmark	
Solmukohta 2000	Helsinki, Finland	
Knutepunkt 2001	Oslo, Norway	
Knutpunkt 2002	Stockholm, Sweden	
Knudepunkt 2003 (Feb. 2003)	Copenhagen, Denmark	
Solmukohta 2004 (Feb. 2004)	Espoo, Finland	
Knutepunkt 2005 (Feb. 2005)	Oslo, Norway	
Knutpunkt 2006 (Apr. 2006)	Barnens Ö (Children's Island), Sweden	
Knudepunkt 2007 (Feb. 2007)	Helsinge, Denmark	
Solmukohta 2008 (Apr. 2008)	Nurmijärvi, Finland	
Knutepunkt 2009 (16-19 Apr. 2009)	Haraldvangen, Norway	
Knutpunkt 2010 (Apr. 2010)	Katrineholm, Sweden	
Knudepunkt 2011 (Feb. 2011)	Helsinge, Denmark	
Solmukohta 2012 (Apr. 2012)	Nurmijärvi, Finland	
Knutepunkt 2013 (Apr. 2013)	Haraldvangen, Norway	
Knutpunkt 2014 (3-6 Apr 2014)	Halland, Sweden	
Knudepunkt 2015 (12-15 Feb. 2015)	Knutepunkt Village (Midtfyns gymnasium, Ringe fri- og efterskole, Nordagerskolen, Midtfyns fritidscenter), Denmark	
Solmukohta 2016 (9-14 Mar. 2016)	Finland	
Knutepunkt 2017 (23-26 Feb. 2017)	Oslo, Norway	
Knutpunkt 2018 (15-18 Mar. 2018)	Lund, Sweden	
Knudepunkt 2019 (8-11 Feb. 2019)	Vejen, Denmark	
Solmukohta 2020 (2–5 Apr. 2020)	Tampere, Finland	
Knutepunkt 2021 (7-20 Oct. 2021)	Oslo, Norway	
Knutpunkt 2022 (9-12 Sep. 2022)	Linköping, Sweden	
Knudepunkt 2023 (May. 2023)	Vejen, Denmark	
Solmukohta 2024 (13-14 Apr. 2023)	Tampere, Finland	

== Publications ==
Since 2001 the Knutepunkt conferences have been accompanied by books on larp theory, with the exception of the 2002 conference in Stockholm.

- Anette Alfsvåg, Ingrid Storrø, Erlend Eidsem Hansen (eds.): The Book. Knudepunkt 2001. no ISBN
- Morten Gade, Line Thorup & Mikkel Sander (eds.): As Larp Grows Up. Knudepunkt 2003. ISBN 87-989377-0-7. https://web.archive.org/web/20060718051716/http://www.laivforum.dk/kp03_book/
- Markus Montola & Jaakko Stenros (eds.): Beyond Role and Play. Solmukohta 2004. ISBN 952-91-6842-X. https://web.archive.org/web/20060615144314/http://www.ropecon.fi/brap/
- Petter Bøckman & Ragnhild Hutchison (eds.): Dissecting Larp. Knutepunkt 2005. ISBN 82-997102-0-0 (print) ISBN 82-997102-1-9 (online) http://knutepunkt.laiv.org/kp05/
- Thorbiörn Fritzon & Tobias Wrigstad (eds.) : Role, Play, Art. Knutpunkt 2006. ISBN 91-631-8853-8 . http://jeepen.org/kpbook/
- Jesper Donnis, Morten Gade & Line Thorup (eds.): Lifelike. Knudepunkt 2007. ISBN 978-87-989377-1-5. https://web.archive.org/web/20070314102705/http://www.liveforum.dk/kp07book/
- Jaakko Stenros & Markus Montola (eds.): Playground Worlds. Solmukohta 2008. ISBN 978-952-92-3579-7 (print) ISBN 978-952-92-3580-3 (pdf) https://web.archive.org/web/20091221130755/http://www.ropecon.fi/pw/
- Matthijs Holter, Eirik Fatland & Even Tømte (eds.): Larp, the Universe and Everything. Knutepunkt 2009. ISBN 978-82-997102-2-0 http://knutepunkt.laiv.org/2009/book/
- Larsson, Elge (ed.): Playing Reality. Knutpunkt 2010 | Interacting Arts. ISBN 978-91-977140-1-3 (print) ISBN 978-91-977140-2-0 (pdf) https://web.archive.org/web/20110818143459/http://interactingarts.org/pdf/Playing%20Reality%20(2010).pdf
- Thomas Duus Henriksen, Christian Bierlich, Kasper Friis Hansen & Valdemar Kølle (eds.): Think Larp - Academic Writings from KP2011. Published by Rollespilsakademiet in conjunction with the Knudepunkt 2011 conference. ISBN 978-87-92507-04-4 https://web.archive.org/web/20120425051237/http://rollespilsakademiet.dk/kpbooks/think_larp_web.pdf
- Claus Raasted (ed.): Talk Larp - Provocative Writings from KP2011. Published by Rollespilsakademiet in conjunction with the Knudepunkt 2011 conference. ISBN 978-87-92507-05-1 https://web.archive.org/web/20120425051302/http://rollespilsakademiet.dk/kpbooks/talk_larp_web.pdf
- Lars Andresen, Charles Bo Nielsen, Luisa Carbonelli, Jesper Heebøll-Christensen, Marie Oscilowski (eds.): Do Larp - Documentary Writings from KP2011. Published by Rollespilsakademiet in conjunction with the Knudepunkt 2011 conference. ISBN 978-87-92507-06-8 https://web.archive.org/web/20110812230824/http://rollespilsakademiet.dk/kpbooks/do_larp_web.pdf
- Juhana Pettersson (ed.): States of Play: Nordic Larp Around the World. Published by Pohjoismaisen roolipelaamisen seura in conjunction with the Solmukohta 2012 conference. ISBN 978-952-67599-4-4 / ISBN 978-952-67599-5-1 (PDF) http://www.nordicrpg.fi/julkaisut/states-of-play/
- Eleanor Saitta, Marie Holm-Andersen and Jon Back (ed.): “The Foundation Stone of Nordic Larp.” Published by Knutpunkt in conjunction with the Knutpunkt 2014 conference ISBN 978-91-637-4565-2 (Print)/ ISBN 978-91-637-4566-9 (PDF) http://nordiclarp.org/w/images/8/80/2014_The_Foundation_Stone_of_Nordic_Larp.pdf
- Jon Back (ed.): “Knutpunkt 2014: Sharpening the Cutting Edge.” Published by Knutpunkt in conjunction with the Knutpunkt 2014 conference ISBN 978-91-637-5217-9 (Print) / ISBN 978-91-637-5218-6 (PDF) http://nordiclarp.org/w/images/e/e8/2014_The_Cutting_Edge_of_Nordic_Larp.pdf
- Charles Bo Nielsen and Claus Raasted (ed.): “The Knudepunkt 2015 Companion Book.” Published by Rollespilsakademiet, Copenhagen, Denmark in conjunction with the Knudepunkt 2015 conference ISBN 978-87-92507-24-2 http://nordiclarp.org/w/images/2/27/Kp2015companionbook.pdf
- Charles Bo Nielsen and Claus Raasted (ed.): “The Nordic Larp Yearbook 2014.” Published by Rollespilsakademiet, Copenhagen, Denmark in conjunction with the Knudepunkt 2015 conference ISBN 978-87-92507-23-5 http://nordiclarp.org/w/images/6/6d/Nordiclarpyearbook2014.pdf

=== Video documentation ===
In 2011 the Knutepunkt conference was documented in a number of videos now published on the Knudepunkt 2011 Vimeo Channel.
