= Nordic LARP =

Style of live action role-playing game

Nordic LARP is a style and tradition of live action role-playing games (LARPs) centered in Sweden, Norway, Denmark, and Finland. New games premiere at the annual Knutepunkt Nordic LARP conference. Gameplay draws upon acting techniques and typically addresses serious and complex historical, political, and/or intellectual themes. For example, Just a Little Lovin deals with the AIDS pandemic within the LGBTQ community in early 1980s New York City. Games prioritize character development, worldbuilding, and intense emotional experiences, in contrast to American LARP, which prioritizes competition and strategy. Nordic LARP players use the term "bleed" to refer to the experience of continuing to feel emotions from gameplay after the game has ended.

Nordic LARP shares similarities with the Chinese style Jubensha.

== Nordic LARP book ==
Nordic LARP is the title of a book about the LARP style, edited by Jaakko Stenros and Markus Montola. The book won the Diana Jones Award in 2012.
