= List of solo role-playing games =

Solo role-playing games are role-playing games that focus on being a solitary experience. They can be played by one person, without the participation of a gamemaster or other players. This category typically includes solo tabletop role-playing games, journaling games, gamebooks, and solo live action role-playing games, but excludes computer role-playing games.

Community-curated directories of solo role-playing games exist, such as the Solo RPG List, which won the 2026 Silver ENNIE award in the Best Online Content category.

This list includes stand-alone solo role-playing games, as well as notable supplements that allow multi-player role-playing games to be played solo.

== List ==
Year	Title	Publisher	Type	System	Setting	Ref.
1976	Buffalo Castle	Flying Buffalo	Solo adventure	Tunnels & Trolls	Fantasy	
1977	Traveller	Game Designers' Workshop	TTRPG	(Classic) Traveller	Science fiction	
1982	The Warlock of Firetop Mountain	Puffin Books	Gamebook	Fighting Fantasy	Fantasy	
1983	The Citadel of Chaos	Puffin Books	Gamebook	Fighting Fantasy	Fantasy	
1984	Flight from the Dark	Hutchinson Publishing Group	Gamebook	Lone Wolf	Fantasy	
1985	Alone Against the Dark	Chaosium	Solo adventure	Basic Role-Playing	Horror	
1985	Alone Against the Wendigo	Chaosium	Solo adventure	Basic Role-Playing	Horror	
1992	Alone on Halloween	Pagan Publishing	Solo adventure	Basic Role-Playing	Horror	
2018	Ironsworn	Tomkin Press	TTRPG	Ironsworn, Powered by the Apocalypse	Fantasy	
2019	Thousand Year Old Vampire	Petit Guignol LLC	Journaling game	—N/a	Historical fantasy	
2021	Apothecaria	Blackwell Games	Journaling game	—N/a	Fantasy	
2021	Field Guide to Memory	Self-published	Journaling game, keepsake game	—N/a	Mystery	
2022	The One Ring Strider Mode	Free League Publishing	Supplement	The One Ring Roleplaying Game	Fantasy	
2022	Ironsworn: Starforged	Tomkin Press	TTRPG	Ironsworn	Science fiction	
2022	Sworn by Ghostlight	Self-published	TTRPG	Ironsworn	Mystery	
2022	Colostle	Self-published	TTRPG	—N/a	Fantasy	
2023	Iron Valley	Self-published	TTRPG	Ironsworn	Generic	
2023	Koriko: A Magical Year	Mousehole Press	Journaling game	—N/a	Fantasy	
2023	Star Trek Adventures: Captain's Log Solo Roleplaying Game	Modiphius Entertainment	TTRPG	2d20 System	Science fiction	
2025	Cyberpunk RED: Single Player Mode	R. Talsorian Games	Supplement	Interlock System	Science fiction	
2026	Fallout: Wasteland Wanderer	Modiphius Entertainment	TTRPG	2d20 System	Science fiction	

== See also ==
- List of tabletop role-playing games
- List of play-by-mail games
- List of Fighting Fantasy gamebooks
- List of Lone Wolf media
