= 2020 ENnie Award winners =

- Awarded for: Best role-playing games of previous year
- Country: United Kingdom & United States
- Presented by: Gen Con
- First award: 2001
- Website: Archive of 2020 ENNIE Awards

The following are the winners of the 20th annual ENnie Awards, held in 2020:

== Judges' Spotlight Winners ==
- Benjamin Adelman – Sleepaway, Author: Jay Dragon
- Rachel Campbell – Glitter Hearts, Leatherman Games, Author: Greg Leatherman
- Christopher Gath – Refractions in Glasston, Chaosium Inc., Authors: Taylor University PWR Press, Sam Guinsatao, Carson Jacobs, T.R. Knight, Joy Lemont, Elijah Oates, Rayce Patterson, Emily Pawlowski, J. Tucker White
- Shauna Ratliff – Knarls Candy Compendium, Authors: Makenzie De Armas, Levi Phipps
- James Surano – Hit the Streets, Defend the Block, Lost Highway Games, Author: Rich Rogers

== List of gold and silver winners ==
Category	Gold Winner	Silver Winner
Best Adventure	A Pound of Flesh, Tuesday Knight Games Authors: Donn Stroud, Sean McCoy, Luke Gearing	Trilemma Adventures Compendium Vol 1, Trilemma Adventures Authors: Michael Prescott, Evey Lockhart, Kira Magrann, Michael Atlin, Sean Winslow, Skerples, Stephanie Bryant, Tim Groth
Best Aid/Accessory	Deck of Many Animated Spells, Hit Point Press	The Dungeon Books of Battle Mats, Loke Battlemats
Best Art, Cover	Call of Cthulhu: Berlin the Wicked City, Chaosium Inc. Artist: Loïc Muzy	The Ultraviolet Grasslands, Exalted Funeral Press Artist: Luka Rejec
Best Art, Interior	The Ultraviolet Grasslands, Exalted Funeral Press Artist: Luka Rejec	Strata, Rowan, Rook and Decard Artist: Adrian Stone
Best Cartography	Trilemma Adventures Compendium Vol 1, Trilemma Adventures	Jim Henson’s Labyrinth, the Adventure Game, River Horse
Best Electronic Book	New Tales of the Miskatonic Valley 2nd Ed., Stygian Fox Authors: Tom Lynch, Keith “Doc” Herber, Kevin Ross, Christopher Smith Adair, Oscar Rios, Seth Skorkowsky	Uncaged Vol III, Scribemind Authors: Alison Huang, Andrew Engelbrite, Annamyriah de Jong, Anthony Beal, Ataberk Bozkurt, Charles Van Slambrouck, Chloe Mashiter, Collette Quach, D. Chaudron, D.W. Dagon, Dai-Wei Pobjie, David Markiwsky, Fenway Jones, Gwen Bassett, Jacky Leung, Jameson Hampton, Jennifer Peig, John Tetzlaff, Karren Loomer, Kathryn Kovalcik, Katie Cunningham, Kayla Cline, Lauren Neuburger, Liz Gist, Luciella Elisabeth Scarlett, Ma’at Crook, Megan Irving, Morgan Geiss, Paige Leitman, Paul Keiter, Ryan Servis, Sam Mannell, Samantha Darcy, Sammy Ward, Sandy Jacobs-Tolle, Satine Phoenix, Scriv The Bard (Alette Smith), Shannon Lewis, Wouter Florusse, Yubi
Best Family Game / Product	Jim Henson’s Labyrinth, the Adventure Game, River Horse Authors: Ben Milton, Jack Caesar	Kids on Bikes: Strange Adventures! Volume Two, Renegade Games / Hunters Entertainment Authors: Jonathan Gilmour, Doug Levandowski
Best Free Game / Product	TTRPG Safety Toolkit, Smooching Knife Authors: Kienna Sunrise, Lauren Bryant-Monk	Tunnel Goons, Highland Paranormal Society Author: Nate Treme
Best Game	ALIEN the Roleplaying Game, Free League Publishing Authors: Tomas Härenstam, Andrew E.C. Gaska	Mörk Borg Artpunk RPG, Free League Publishing Authors: Pelle Nilsson, Johan Nohr
Best Layout and Design	Mörk Borg Artpunk RPG, Free League Publishing Pelle Nilsson, Johan Nohr	A Pound of Flesh, Tuesday Knight Games Sean McCoy, Jan Buragay
Best Monster/Adversary	Mordenkainen’s Fiendish Folio, Volume 1: Monsters Malevolent and Benign, Wizards of the Coast Authors: Mike Mearls, Bart Carroll, Bill Benham	Big Bad Booklet 1-6, Hit Point Press Author: Hit Point Press
Best Online Content	The Monsters Know What They're Doing – Combat Tactics for DMs, Saga Press	RPG Writers Workshop, Scribemind
Best Organized Play	Stygia Untamed, Greasy Snitches, Paul Gabat	Where Can She Be, Robbie Pleasant
Best Podcast	Asians Represent!	Red Moon Roleplaying
Best Production Values	Thousand Year Old Vampire, Petit Guignol	Humblewood Box Set, Hit Point Press
Best RPG Related Product	Absinthe in Carcosa, Pelgrane Press Author: Robin Laws	Session Zero, Bullypup Publishing Author: John C. Byram
Best Rules	Thousand Year Old Vampire, Petit Guignol Author: Tim Hutchings	Zombie World, Magpie Games Author: Brendan G. Conway, Mark Diaz Truman
Best Setting	Call of Cthulhu: Berlin the Wicked City, Chaosium Inc. Authors: David Larkins, Mike Mason, Lynne Hardy	Arkadia – The Greek Setting for 5e, Arcana Games Authors: Eugene Fasano, Ken Roberts
Best Supplement	Delta Green: The Labyrinth, Arc Dream Publishing Authors: John Scott Tynes	Ironsworn Delve, Shawn Tomkin Authors: Shawn Tomkin, Matt Click
Best Writing	Mörk Borg Artpunk RPG, Free League Publishing Authors: Pelle Nilsson, Johan Nohr	The Monsters Know What They're Doing, Saga Press Author: Keith Ammann
Product of the Year	Mörk Borg Artpunk RPG, Free League Publishing	Thousand Year Old Vampire, Petit Guignol
