= 2022 ENNIE Award winners =

- Awarded for: Best role-playing games of previous year
- Country: United Kingdom & United States
- Presented by: Gen Con
- First award: 2001
- Website: Archive of 2022 ENNIE Awards

The following are the winners of the 22nd annual ENnie Awards, held in 2022:

== Spotlight and other awards ==
Judges' Spotlight Winners:

- Amelia Antrim – Dwelling, Good Luck Press Author: Seb Pines
- Di – Stack of Goblins, CobblePath Games Author: Jack Milton
- Christopher Gath – Shanty Hunters, Molten Sulfur Press Author: Tristan Zimmerman
- Salim Hakima – Kobold Guide to Monsters, Kobold Press Authors: Monte Cook, Wolfgang Baur, Mike Mason, Crystal Frasier, Mike Shea, Shanna Germain, Steve Winter, and many more
- Shiny O’Brien – Wickedness, Possum Creek Games Author: M Veselak

Fan Award for Best Publisher:

- Darrington Press

== List of gold and silver winners ==
Category	Gold Winner	Silver Winner
Best Adventure	Uncaged: Goddesses, Unseelie Studios Authors: Amber Litke, Anthony Beal, Arnout Brokking, Cat Evans, D.E. Chaudron, Dylan Ramsey, Garrett Colón, Grady Wang, Isla Lader, Jackie Yang, Jesse Heinig, Jessica Marcrum, Karren Loomer, Laurie O’Connel, Lee Morgan, Margaret Mae, Matthew Campbell, Michael Reid, Nina Nicole, Sadie Lowry, Steffie de Vaan, Theo Thourson	The Troubleshooters – The U-Boat Mystery, Helmgast Author: Krister Sundelin
Best Aid/Accessory – Digital	Mörk Borg Digital Monster Generator, Stockholm Kartell & Ockult Örtmästare Games	Call of Cthulhu 3D Digital Gamer Props – Masks of Nyarlathotep, TYPE40
Best Aid/Accessory – Non-Digital	Call of Cthulhu Classic Prop Set, H.P. Lovecraft Historical Society	Fate Accessibility Toolkit, Evil Hat Productions
Best Art, Cover	Wanderhome, Possum Creek Games Artist: Ruby Lavin and Sylvia Bi	Uncaged: Goddesses, Unseelie Studios Artist: Gwen Bassett
Best Art, Interior	The One Ring RPG, Second Edition, Free League Publishing Artists: Martin Grip, Alvaro Tapia, Jan Pospíšil, Niklas Brandt, Henrik Rosenborg, Antonio De Luca, Federica Costantini, Luca Sotgiu, Daniele Sorrentino, Melissa Spandri, Giuditta Betti	Wanderhome, Possum Creek Games Artists: Ruby Lavin, Letty Wilson, Jennie Lindberg, Conner Fawcett, Danny Kyobe, Jo Thierolf, L Henderson, Dominique Ramsey, Nadhir Nor, Geneva Bowers, Cam Adjodha, Juho Choi, Núria Tamarit, Kimberli Johnson, and Sabii Borno
Best Cartography	Czepeku Maps Collection, Czepeku Ltd Artists: Cze and Peku	KULT: Labyrinths & Secret Chambers, Helmgast Artists: Andreas Ruu Viklund, Fredik Toreblad, Roplans, Petter Nallo, Anita Siastra
Best Electronic Book	The Lazy DM’s Companion, Sly Flourish Author: Michael E. Shea	One Night Strahd, Hedra Group Authors: Jake Kurzer, Adam Seats, Evangeline Gallagher
Best Family Game / Product	Wanderhome, Possum Creek Games Author: Jay Dragon	Questlings: RPG, Letiman Games, LLC Authors: Banana Chan, Tim Devine
Best Free Game / Product	The 2021 Level 1 Anthology, 9th Level Games Authors: Adam Bell, Whitney Delaglio, Michael Faulk, Zane Graves, Josh Hittie, Tim Hutchings, N. Maxwell Lander, Mara Li, Tim McCracken, Nat Mesnard, Dawn Metcalf, RK Payne, Lysa Penrose, Helena Real, Jack Rosetree, Starshine Scribbles, Joel Salda, Alexi Sargeant, Scott Uhls, and Max V.	Auld Sanguine: A Vampire: The Masquerade New Year’s Eve Story, Renegade Game Studios Author: Eddy Webb
Best Game	Thirsty Sword Lesbians, Evil Hat Productions Author: April Kit Walsh	Root: The RPG, Magpie Games Authors: Brendan Conway, Mark Diaz Truman, Sarah Doom, Marissa Kelly, Miguel Ángel Espinoza
Best Layout and Design	Delta Green: Impossible Landscapes, Arc Dream Publishing Authors: Dennis Detwiller, Stephen Buck, Shane Ivey	Achtung! Cthulhu 2d20: Gamemaster's Guide, Modiphius Entertainment
Best Monster/Adversary	Nightfell – Bestiary for 5e, Mana Project Studio Authors: Angelo Peluso, Andrea Lucca, Marco Giulio Fossati	Home-Field Advantage: a Compendium of Lair Actions Authors: Trekiros, Sean Vas Terra, Taron Pounds, Boyan Valev, Kirsty Kidd, Xhango Games, Zavier Bates, Devlin DM, Joe Gaylord
Best Online Content	RPGBOT.net, RPGBOT LLC	Sly Flourish Blog, Sly Flourish
Best Organized Play	I Find That Familiar Author: Paul Gabat	Two Hearts Apart Author: Shu Qing Tan
Best Podcast	Ain't Slayed Nobody Push the Roll LLC	Role To Cast
Best Production Values	Call of Cthulhu Classic Prop Set, H.P. Lovecraft Historical Society	Legend of the Ancient Forge, Steamforged Games
Best RPG Related Product	Shadows of Esteren: Adeliane CD, Studio Agate	KULT: Labyrinths & Secret Chambers, Helmgast Authors: Catherine Evans, Kristina Horner, Andreas Ruu Viklund, Alex Obernigg, Jacqueline Bryk, Fredik Toreblad, Mattias Närvä, Petter Nallo, Terje Nordin
Best Rules	Colostle: A Solo RPG Adventure Author: Nich Angell	Haunted West, Darker Hue Studios Authors: Chris Spivey, Angel Adeyoha, Evan Perlman, Daniel Kwan, Alexandra Jackson, Adam Alexander, Alex Mayo, Neall Raemonn Price, Misha Bushyager, Cameron Hays, Rose Bailey, Kenneth Hite, Cori Redford, Mark Morrison, Dennis Detwiller
Best Setting	Tal'Dorei Campaign Setting Reborn, Darrington Press Authors: Matthew Mercer, Hannah Rose, James J. Haeck	Jiangshi: Blood in the Banquet Hall, Wet Ink Games, Game and a Curry Authors: Banana Chan, Sen-Foong Lim, Elton Lau, James Mendez Hodes, Aaron Catano-Saez, Ross Cheung, Kienna Shaw, Daniel Kwan, Jonaya Kemper, Sammi Lai
Best Supplement	Call of Cthulhu: Cults of Cthulhu, Chaosium Inc. Authors: Chris Lackey and Mike Mason	Root: The RPG: Travelers and Outsiders, Magpie Games Authors: Brendan Conway, Sarah Doom, Marissa Kelly, Danielle Lauzon, Simon Moody, Sarah “Sam” Saltiel, Mark Diaz Truman, Camdon Wright, Miguel Ángel Espinoza
Best Writing	Dune – Adventures in the Imperium: Core Rulebook, Modiphius Entertainment Authors: Richard August, Simon Berman, Banana Chan, Nathan Dowdell, Jason Durall, Khaldoun Khelil, Helena Nash, Andrew Peregrine, Hilary Sklar, Chris Spivey, Mari Tokuda, Rachel J Wilkinson, Ben Woerner	Fateforge: Tetralogy Box Set 5e, Studio Agate
Product of the Year	Thirsty Sword Lesbians, Evil Hat Productions	Call of Cthulhu Classic Prop Set, H.P. Lovecraft Historical Society
