= Sleepaway =

Sleepaway may refer to:

- Sleepaway (band), an American indie rock band
- Sleepaway (game), a tabletop role-playing game

== See also ==
- Sleepaway Camp (film series), a series of slasher films
- Sleepover
