= Colostle =

Solo role-playing game

- Designers: Nich Angell
- Illustrators: Nich Angell
- Publishers: Self-published (English); Arkhane Asylum Publishing (French); NEED GAMES! (Italian); The Hill Press (Spanish)
- Genres: Solo role-playing game
- Players: 1–2
- Expansions: The Roomlands; Kyodaina; Dungeons
- Website: Official website

Colostle (originally published as Colostle: A Solo RPG Adventure) is a solo role-playing game designed and illustrated by Nich Angell. Originally funded through a Kickstarter campaign in 2021 and published in 2022, the game uses a standard 52-card deck and narrative prompts to guide a player in writing a character's adventure. The game is set in the Colostle, a castle so large that it contains landscapes, settlements, and other environments.

Colostle was a Gold Winner at the 2022 ENNIE Awards in the "Best Rules" category and was nominated in five other categories. Reviewers have praised its illustrations and setting, although some have criticised its light rules. Multiple expansions have since been released for the game, including The Roomlands, Kyodaina, and Dungeons, adding new locations and mechanics.

== Gameplay ==
Colostle is a solo role-playing game. At its core it is a prompt-based journalling game, providing the player with narrative prompts that they can then interpret to write down what happens to their character. Colostle occupies a niche between pure journalling games like the Thousand Year Old Vampire and the more traditionally structured tabletop role-playing games by focusing on the character's actions and using character sheets to keep track of items, abilities, and information. While the game is primarily intended to be played by a single person, official rules for two-player co-operative play exist.

=== Character creation ===
During character creation, the player is given the option to choose from three character classes: The Armed, The Followed, and The Helmed. The classes give the characters different combat and exploration statistics, as well as special abilities. A character has two core statistics, one for exploration and the other for combat. These numbers represent both the abilities and health points of the character. If either falls to zero, the adventure ends. Later expansions add more classes for the player to choose from.

Aside from choosing the class, the player needs to determine the character's calling and nature. These play no mechanical role and simply determine the character's personality and reason for going on an adventure. For this reason, they can be either randomly picked from a table or made up by the player.

=== Resolution mechanics ===
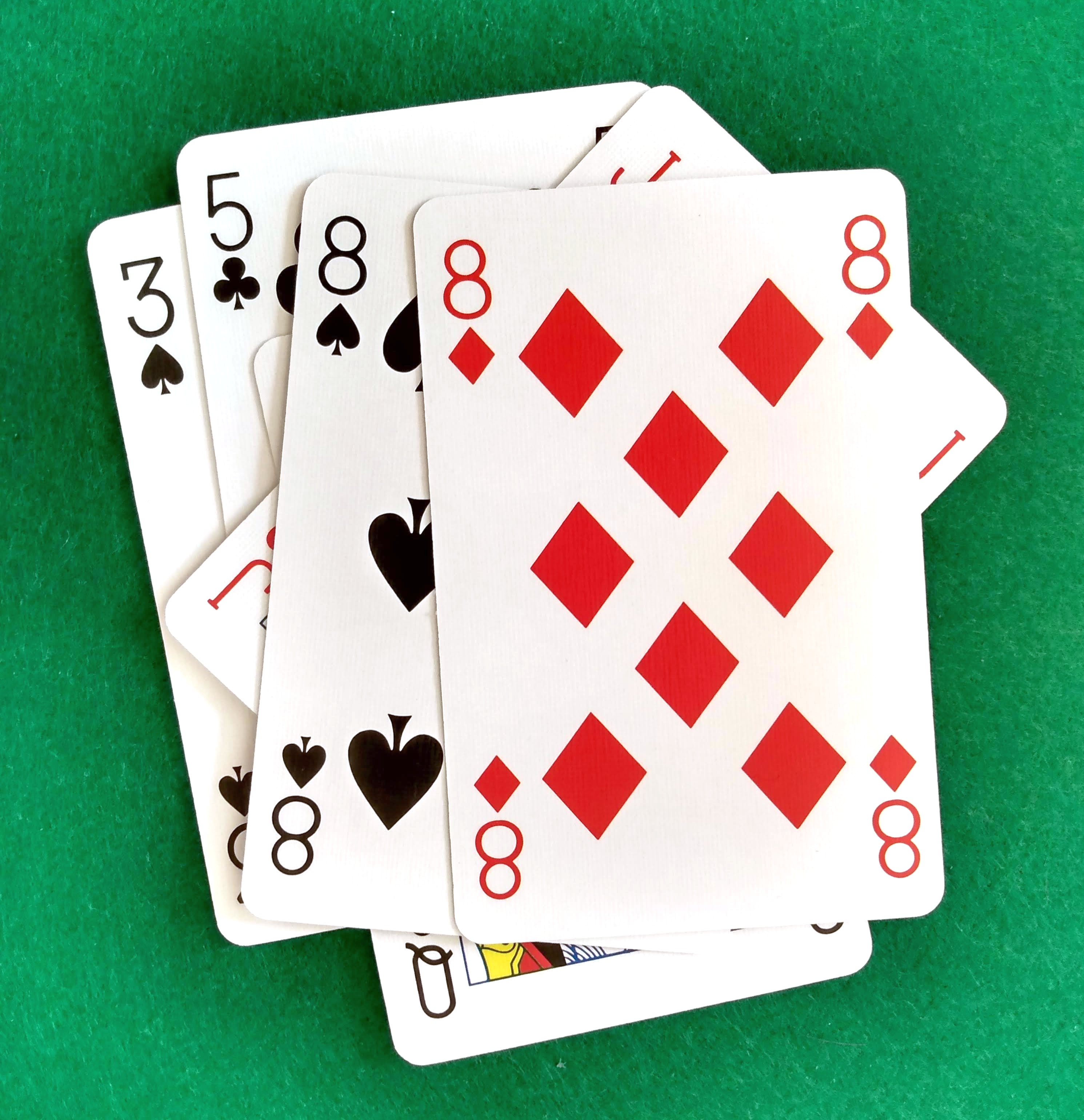
Colostle uses playing cards for resolution, rather than dice

The game uses a standard deck of 52 playing cards to determine what happens. At the start of each day of the character's journey, a number of cards are drawn, which trigger an event, an encounter, or a discovery, sometimes followed by combat. The values of the cards point to a table in the rulebook, giving the player a prompt to interpret freely and describe in their journal. The author calls it "part game, part creative-writing exercise". The number of cards the player draws during the exploration phase depends on the character's exploration score.

If the player decides to engage in combat, they draw a number of cards equal to their character's combat score and their opponent's combat score and compare their values. Arnaud Cuidet writes in a review of Colostle that combat is the most developed aspect of the game's rules. Despite that, combat encounters are always optional. Combat is an infrequent element of Colostle, which prioritises exploration and the character's response to the world.

== Setting ==
The game's title is a combination of the words "colossal" and "castle". Its setting is the eponymous Colostle, a giant castle that houses things like mountains, rivers, and cities. The Colostle is so big that it appears to stretch infinitely and have no exterior. However, it still has many architectural features of a castle. The Colostle is inhabited by people, fantastical animals, and magical stone automata called Rooks.

== Publication history ==
Colostle was written and illustrated by Nich Angell, a designer based in Gloucestershire, UK. The game was originally a minor side project for the author. During the COVID-19 lockdowns, Nich Angell could not play with his Dungeons & Dragons group as often as he used to. This led him to discover solo role-playing and prompted him to create his own game in the genre. For this project, Angell repurposed a setting he had originally intended for an illustrated story.

In early 2021, Angell launched a Kickstarter crowdfunding campaign to fund the publication of Colostle. The campaign was part of Kickstarter's Make 100 creative initiative. It surpassed the initial goal of £250 within four hours of its launch, raising just under £45,000 with the support of 3,000 backers. The game was published in 2022 and went on to sell 10,000 copies.

=== Supplements ===
A large amount of fan content has been created for Colostle, as well as several official expansions.

In early 2022, the first official expansion for Colostle, called Colostle: The Roomlands, was funded through Kickstarter. The expansion added more content to the game, such as locations, classes, prompts, and enemy types. The Roomlands also contains a solo adventure called "The Search for the Seastone", providing a more guided experience than the more open-ended main game. All of the content of Colostle: The Roomlands was later added without changes to a subsequent edition of the core Colostle rulebook.

Colostle: The Roomlands was followed up with Colostle: Kyodaina, an Asian-themed expansion. In 2024, the next expansion was released, titled Colostle: Dungeons. Dungeons expands the scope of the world of Colostle with massive underground dungeons and adds new gameplay mechanics.

In addition to expansions, various accessories for Colostle have been released. Among them are an official journal with one hundred pre-formatted pages, as well as a themed deck of cards.

=== In other languages ===
Colostle was published in France by Arkhane Asylum Publishing. As of February 2025, only the base game and The Roomlands expansion had been translated into French.

In Italy, Colostle was published by Need Games. They translated the core rulebook, The Roomlands expansion, as well as the official journal and playing cards into Italian. The second expansion, Colostle: Kyodaina, was also translated and published.

The Hill Press published Colostle in Spain in 2024.

== Reception ==
Professional ratings
Review scores
Source	Rating
Numerama	6/10
SpazioGames	8/10

Colostle was a Gold Winner at the 2022 ENNIE Awards in the category "Best Rules" and was additionally nominated for "Best Cover Art", "Best Game", "Best Setting", "Best Writing", and "Product of the Year".

Colostle received broadly positive reviews from the British magazine Tabletop Gaming, the French website Numerama, and the Italian site SpazioGames. Writing for Tabletop Gaming, Richard Jansen-Parkes called the game "one of the most charming contenders to emerge from the recent boom in solo journalling RPGs" and praised its atmosphere. In his review for Numerama, Sébastien Goetz praised the accessibility of the game's mechanics and its introspective focus. However, he found that the lightness of Colostle's mechanics, as well as its high dependence on the player's own inspiration and imagination, might put some players off, ultimately giving it a 6/10 rating. Roberto Buonanno, the reviewer for SpazioGames, rated Colostle 8/10, praising Nich Angell's illustrations and the game's system of narrative prompts.

In issue 46 of Casus Belli, the reviewer Arnaud Cuidet was more critical of the game. While praising its aesthetics and creativity, Cuidet found the game's mechanics lacking, describing them as "strange". He wrote that there is a contradiction within Colostle: despite being a narrativist game, its most mechanically fleshed-out part is the combat, which he found to be the only part of the game with clear stakes and resolution criteria. Cuidet did not like Colostle's exploration system, saying that many of the prompts produced by the cards can be cryptic and that the game requires a lot of creative work from the player to produce an interesting story.

== See also ==
- 2022 ENNIE Award winners
