= Wanderhome =

Tabletop role-playing game

- Designers: Jay Dragon
- Illustrators: Cam Adjodha, Sabii Borno, Geneva Bowers, Lauren Henderson, Kimberli Johnson, Jo Thierolf, Dominique Ramsey, Nadhir Nor, Jennie Lindberg, Danny Kyobe, Conner Fawcett, Juho Choi
- Publishers: Possum Creek Games
- Publication: 2021
- Genres: tabletop role-playing game, fantasy
- Systems: Belonging Outside Belonging
- Skills: role-playing, improvisation
- Website: possumcreekgames.com/pages/wanderhome

Wanderhome is an indie role-playing game by game designer Jay Dragon about animal people in a pastoral setting, based upon the Belonging Outside Belonging game system by Avery Alder and Benjamin Rosenbaum. It was published by Possum Creek Games soon after Dragon's Sleepaway. Unlike typical tabletop role-playing games, Wanderhome does not use dice, turns, or a gamemaster, focusing instead on the characters' emotional journey. Dialogue takes the place of battles, and gameplay revolves around question prompts.

The mood of Wanderhome, according to Chase Carter for Polygon, is cozy and wholesome, with an undercurrent of trauma from the land's past wars. It was influenced by the Redwall books and Studio Ghibli animated films. It was funded and fulfilled through Kickstarter.

Wanderhome won 2022 ENNIE Awards for Best Family-Friendly Game (Gold), Best Cover Art (Gold), and Best Interior Art (Silver). Wanderhome was nominated for the 2021 Nebula Award for Best Game Writing. Wanderhome was featured in Itch.io's charity bundle for abortion funds.
