= The Quiet Year =

Map-making tabletop role-playing game

- Cover art by Ariel Norris
- Designers: Avery Alder
- Illustrators: Ariel Norris
- Publishers: Buried Without Ceremony
- Publication: 2013
- Genres: tabletop role-playing game
- Players: 2-4
- Playing time: 3-4 hours
- Chance: Medium
- Age range: 12 and up
- Skills: storytelling, drawing, improvisation

The Quiet Year is a map-drawing tabletop role-playing game published by indie game publisher Buried Without Ceremony in 2013 in which players collaboratively create maps to drive a central story of survival.

== Description ==
=== Equipment ===
The game provides the rules and a deck of 52 cards. The players must provide pencils or markers for drawing, as well as paper and six-sided dice. There is no gamemaster.

=== Gameplay ===
In a post-apocalyptic setting, 2–4 players represent not individuals, but parts of a community that has just barely survived a crushing winter. The players must "describe the everyday activities of a small community of survivors", planning how they will rebuild and prepare for the next winter. The game lasts up to 52 turns, each turn representing one week, each turn taken by one player. The passage of turns is marked by a deck of playing cards where the suits each represent a season of the year and each card represents the arrival of certain events such as bad news, changes in luck and project delays.

Each turn starts with the description on the relevant card. The active player then chooses one of three possible actions to do:

- "Discover Something New": The active player adds something new to the map, which can be a place, an item or a person.
- "Start a Project": All the players are allowed to role-play about something on the map and what to do about it. The players determine how many turns these actions take, which are tracked by a six-sided die.
- "Hold a Discussion": Each player can share one thought on a topic.

Conversation is strictly limited by the rules. As critic Adam Dixon noted, "Most turns only one player gets to speak; a few sentences about what has happened that week, describing places, events and people. These limits mean you can never describe anything fully, creating a void other players can add to."

This can create frustration in the game, and disagreement can be expressed by taking Contempt tokens, which have no mechanical purpose but symbolize the difficulty of community decision making. Adam Dixon pointed out, "The clever thing about the contempt mechanic is that it has no hard mechanical impact on the game. It has no effect on the community, the map, chances of success; its effect is purely social. It's a way of indicating feelings that you can't talk about, if it changes anything it's how the players interact."

At the end of the turn, another card is drawn, and the next player becomes the active player. The game ends with the final card, the king of spades, which represents the arrival of the mysterious Frost Shepherds. The card asks, "When the Frost Shepherds arrive, does our community survive?" The players then must make a decision. Critic Adam Dixon noted, "The answer, usually, is no."

== Publication history ==
Avery Alder created The Quiet Year, and it was published as a boxed set with a 32-page rulebook that was published by Buried Without Ceremony in 2013 with illustrations by Ariel Norris and Daniel Jimbert.

A new edition of the game, with larger cards, rules refinements, and extra components, was published in 2019.

A sequel, Deep Forest, was co-created by Avery Alder and Mark Diaz Truman, co-founder of Magpie Games. In this game, players represent monsters rebuilding their community in the aftermath of destructive colonization by humans.

== Reception ==
Adam Dixon, writing for Kill Screen, commented, "The game focuses on communication, who talks and how. It echoes conversation in real communities, and the lack of it." Dixon concluded, "You might care for what you’ve built, but communities in The Quiet Year tend towards brokenness. You build a beautiful simulacrum of a community before being shown its flaws. The game shows us that communities are a process, constantly being broken and fixed by the people who care about them."

In his 2023 book Monsters, Aliens, and Holes in the Ground, RPG historian Stu Horvath noted, "As the players embody an entire community, rather than the individuals within it, the game fosters imprecision in how players talk to each other." Horvath warned, "The Quiet Year is an experimental game, and it is not for everyone. Limiting discussion is an unusual constraint that pushes against the social norms of the gaming table." Horvath concluded, "Many other games built around or including collaborative cartography have appeared in its wake ... and it is an important part of a growing movement for creating games devoted to the act of world building."

The game has been featured on the actual play podcasts The Adventure Zone and Friends at the Table.

== Awards ==
- At the 2013 Indie RPG Awards, The Quiet Year was
  - Winner in the category "Most Innovative Game"
  - Runner-up for "Best Production"
  - Runner-up for "Game of the Year"
- At the 2013 Golden Geek Awards, it was
  - Finalist in the category "RPG of the Year"
  - Finalist in the category "Best RPG Artwork or Presentation"
