= The House Beyond Your Sky =

Short story by Benjamin Rosenbaum

- Short story by Benjamin Rosenbaum
- Country: United States
- Language: English
- Genre: Science fiction

Publication
- Published in: Strange Horizons
- Publication type: Web Site
- Publication date: 2006

"The House Beyond Your Sky" is a science fiction short story written in 2006 by American writer Benjamin Rosenbaum.

The story is about Matthias, a priest of an extremely ancient and highly advanced race of beings, who inhabit a cold and dying universe. Matthias maintains a library of virtual universes, including the one inhabited by humans. However, he has also begun to construct a new, real universe, attracting the attention of one of the most powerful members of his race. So, as he watches a sorrowful little girl with an abusive father in one of his virtual worlds, Matthias prepares for the arrival of this pilgrim, who has an interesting proposal.

"The House Beyond Your Sky" was nominated for the 2007 Hugo Award for Best Short Story.
