= Dream Askew, Dream Apart =

2018 tabletop role-playing games

- Designers: Avery Alder, Benjamin Rosenbaum
- Publication: 2018
- Genres: Tabletop role-playing game
- Systems: Belonging Outside Belonging

Dream Askew, Dream Apart is a set of two tabletop role-playing games about marginalized communities struggling for survival. "Dream Askew" was designed by Avery Alder and "Dream Apart" was designed by Benjamin Rosenbaum. Dream Askew, Dream Apart is the blueprint for the Belonging Outside Belonging game system.

== Belonging Outside Belonging ==
Both games use the Belonging Outside Belonging system, a set of dice-less mechanics that focuses on storytelling. Alder began designing the system for "Dream Askew," then collaborated with Rosenbaum to further develop it for "Dream Apart." The system became the basis of many games by other designers, including Wanderhome and Sleepaway. As of July 2024, Itch.io lists 211 products with the tag "Belonging Outside Belonging."

== Themes ==
"Dream Askew" focuses on queer survivors of an apocalypse fighting threats and gathering resources.

"Dream Apart" has Jewish protagonists and takes place in a fantasy version of a shtetl in 19th-century Europe. The historical setting also includes supernatural elements. The game allows players to take on one of six archetypes: the Matchmaker, the Klezmer, the Midwife, the Scholar, the Soldier, and the Sorcerer. In an interview with Gabriela Geselowitz for Tablet, Rosenbaum stated that his inspiration for the game was to represent a Jewish perspective on pogroms and Christian domination during the Middle Ages: "It was always kind of clear to me even as a little kid that we were on the other side of the sword."

== Reception ==
Dream Askew, Dream Apart was nominated for three 2019 ENNIE Awards: "Best Game," "Best Setting," and "Product of the Year." K.W. Colyard for Book Riot recommended "Dream Askew" for readers of post-apocalyptic fiction and "Dream Apart" for fans of Tevye the Dairyman.

In 2023, the UK Games Expo rejected a proposal for a live game of "Dream Askew" due to queer content and themes. The director of the Expo later apologized.

== Publication history ==
Avery Alder published an early version of "Dream Askew" for free download from her website in 2014. This prototype won the 2014 Indie RPG Awards for "Best Free Game." The revised version of "Dream Askew" and "Dream Apart" were published together as a single book in 2018 after raising CA$62,355 on kickstarter.
