= True Names (2008 story) =

2008 novella by Cory Doctorow and Benjamin Rosenbaum

"True Names" is a 2008 science fiction story by Cory Doctorow and Benjamin Rosenbaum. It was first published in the anthology Fast Forward 2.

Doctorow and Rosenbaum subsequently made the story available under the terms of the Creative Commons license.

== Synopsis ==
Beebe and Demiurge are matrioshka brains, at war with each other as they both try to convert all matter in the universe into computronium.

== Receptions ==
"True Names" was a finalist for the 2009 Hugo Award for Best Novella.

Strange Horizons praised it as an "exercise in extreme imagination" and a "magnificent display of pre-existing ideas arranged in fabulous geometries and twisted into pleasing, recombinant strategies of exuberance", but nonetheless found it lacking in literary quality, with "stultified" dialogue, and characters whose "behavior comprised more of wide-eyed naivete and sardonic posturing than any real emotion".

The Los Angeles Review of Books observed that "True Names" "obviously pays homage to (Vernor) Vinge's classic story of that title," while the SF Site considered that it "resonate(s) a bit with (Greg) Egan."
