= Apothecaria =

2021 fantasy tabletop role-playing game

- Designers: Anna Blackwell
- Publication: 2021
- Genres: Tabletop role-playing game, fantasy
- Players: 1

Apothecaria is a single-player, journal-writing, fantasy tabletop role-playing game by Anna Blackwell about working at a village apothecary as a substitute for its mysteriously missing witch. Gameplay focuses on brewing potions to heal fantasy illnesses. It was inspired by Studio Ghibli films and the video games Stardew Valley and Theme Hospital. Apothecaria was published in 2021 after raising £19,066 on Kickstarter.

== Gameplay ==
The object of the game is to forage recipe ingredients, then brew potions to heal villagers. The central game mechanic is drawing cards and writing responses to prompts in a dedicated journal. The game includes farm life sim, exploration, and crafting elements.

== Reception ==
Chase Carter for Dicebreaker recommended Apothecaria for fans of Pokémon Legends: Arceus and wrote that, "There’s an overarching narrative to Apothecaria, but the game plays just as well if approached as a thematic journaling exercise."
