= Koriko: A Magical Year =

2023 fantasy tabletop role-playing game

- Designers: Jack Harrison
- Illustrators: Deb JJ Lee
- Publication: 2023
- Genres: Tabletop role-playing game, fantasy

Koriko: A Magical Year is a single-player, fantasy tabletop role-playing game by Jack Harrison with illustrations by Deb JJ Lee. The game is structured around Tarot card readings and letter writing throughout the four seasons. It was inspired by the film Kiki's Delivery Service. The game was published in 2023 after raising £235,791 on kickstarter. It won two 2024 Silver ENNIE Awards.

== Gameplay ==
Koriko is a journaling game, meaning the player writes in a journal in response to prompts produced by the game. Play requires dice and a deck of tarot cards.

== Reception ==
Koriko: A Magical Year won two 2024 Silver ENNIE Awards for "Best Art: Cover" and "Best Production Values." It was also nominated for two additional 2024 ENNIE Awards: "Product of the Year" and "Best Writing." Chase Carter for Polygon called Koriko: A Magical Year one of the 7 most anticipated new tabletop games coming out in 2023.

Eleanor Hingley of Destructoid praised Koriko for its mechanics and story and suggested that it is a good introductory tabletop role-playing game, or a game parents and teachers could play with kids. However, she points out that some players may be put off by the setup that is more complicated compared to many solo games and the relatively slow pace.
