= Star Trek Adventures =

Tabletop roleplaying game set in the Star Trek universe

- Second edition quickstart cover
- Designers: Nathan Dowdell
- Publishers: Modiphius Entertainment
- Publication: 2017 First Edition; 2024 Second Edition
- Genres: Science fiction (Star Trek)
- Players: 4-6

Star Trek Adventures is a table-top roleplaying game based on the Star Trek franchise and published by Modiphius Entertainment. The game uses a modified version of the publisher's 2d20 System and has been in publication since 2017. The first edition was released in August 2017, and the second edition in August 2024, both at Gen Con.

== Official Publications ==
=== Core Rule Books ===
- Star Trek Adventures (2017)
- Star Trek Adventures Starter Set (2018)
- Star Trek Adventures: The Klingon Empire (2020)
- First edition cover
  Star Trek Adventures Tricorder Collector's Box Set (2022)
- Captain's Log Solo Roleplaying Game (2023)
- Star Trek Adventures 2E (2024)

=== Supplements ===
- Game Master Screen and Reference Sheets (2017)
- The Command Division (2018)
- The Operations Division (2018)
- The Sciences Division (2019)
- Beta Quadrant (2018)
- Alpha Quadrant (2019)
- Gamma Quadrant (2020)
- Delta Quadrant (2020)
- The Klingon Empire Game Master Toolkit (2020)
- Player's Guide (2022)
- Gamemaster's Guide (2022)
- Utopia Planitia Starfleet Sourcebook (2022)
- Game Toolkit 2E (2024)

=== Adventures and Campaign Guides ===
- These Are The Voyages: Mission Compendium Vol 1 (2017)
- Strange New Worlds: Mission Compendium Vol 2 (2019)
- The Shackleton Expanse Campaign Guide (2021)
- Discovery Campaign Guide (2022)
- Lower Decks Campaign Guide (2023)
- The Federation-Klingon War Tactical Campaign (2024)

== Reception ==
In a review of Star Trek Adventures in Black Gate, Patrick Kanouse said:

Overall, Star Trek Adventures is an excellent system with rich but simple mechanics that support the feel of a Star Trek game. Modiphius [has] done a superb job, and any wishing to play in the Star Trek universe should take a look at this game system. I look forward to my own gaming group's continuing missions.

In a 2024 review of the 2nd edition for Forbes, Rob Wieland wrote:

The original edition of Star Trek Adventures focused on older media in the franchise because it came out during something of a fallow period for the IP. This book includes content from the popular shows that have come out more recently [...] The second edition focuses more on feeling like Star Trek, which I already thought the first edition did well. [...] Star Trek Adventures Second Edition is a great jumping on point for new fans while also making changes to the rules fans of the original edition will find mostly painless.

James Amey for Trek Central wrote:

it’s clear that the 2E rulebook was built with fan feedback at the forefront of the design process. [...] It’s leaps and bounds ahead of the previous book in the areas that count. Accessibility, readability and structure.
