= Benjamin Rosenbaum =

American novelist

- Born: August 23, 1969 (age 57); Long Island, New York, US

Benjamin Rosenbaum (born August 23, 1969) is an American science fiction, fantasy, and literary fiction writer, game designer, and computer programmer. His stories and novels have been finalists for the Hugo Award, the Nebula Award, the Theodore Sturgeon Award, the BSFA Award, the World Fantasy Award, and the Otherwise Award. His tabletop role-playing game Dream Apart, together with Avery Alder's Dream Askew, was a finalist for the 2019 ENNIE Awards for Best Game, Best Setting, and Product of the Year. His Jewish historical fantasy interactive novel The Ghost and the Golem, published by Choice of Games, was a finalist for the 2024 Nebula Award for Best Game Writing and longlisted for the 2025 Otherwise Award.

== Career ==
Born in Long Island, New York and raised in Arlington, Virginia, Rosenbaum received degrees in computer science and religious studies from Brown University.

His past software development positions include designing software for the National Science Foundation, designing software for the D.C. city government, and being one of the founders of Digital Addiction (which created the online game Sanctum).

His first professionally published story appeared in 2001. His work has been published in The Magazine of Fantasy & Science Fiction, Asimov's Science Fiction, Harper's Magazine, Nature, and McSweeney's Quarterly Concern. It has also appeared on the websites Strange Horizons and Infinite Matrix, and in various year's best anthologies. The Ant King and Other Stories, a collection of Rosenbaum's short fiction, was published by Small Beer Press.

His first novel was published by Piper Verlag in German under the title Die Auflösung in May 2018. The English version, edited by Liz Gorinsky, was released June 8, 2021 by Erewhon Books as The Unraveling. It was Honor Listed for the 2021 Otherwise Award.

His 2018 Jewish historical fantasy game Dream Apart, inspired by and eventually published alongside Avery Alder's Dream Askew, co-created the Belonging Outside Belonging system, inspiring games such as Wanderhome and Balikbayan.

== Personal life ==
Rosenbaum formerly lived in Washington, D.C. with his wife Esther and children Aviva and Noah. He currently lives near Basel, Switzerland.

== Selected stories ==
- "True Names" (2008) (online), collaboration with Cory Doctorow, was nominated for a Hugo Award.
- "Anthroptic" (2007) (online) collaboration with visual artist Ethan Ham
- "A Siege of Cranes" (2006) (online) was nominated for a World Fantasy Award.
- "Embracing-the-New" (2004) (online) was nominated for Nebula Award for Best Short Story.
- "Biographical Notes to 'A Discourse on the Nature of Causality, with Air-Planes', by Benjamin Rosenbaum" (2004) (online) was nominated for the Hugo Award for Best Novelette.
- "Start the Clock" (2004) (online), was written for the book project Exquisite Corpuscle, where each contributor produced something inspired by the previous contributor's piece (they weren't shown the preceding pieces). It was nominated for a Theodore Sturgeon Award.
- "The House Beyond Your Sky" (2006) (online) was nominated for a BSFA Award and a Hugo Award.

He released all seven stories under Creative Commons licenses, in the latter three cases allowing others to modify the work.
