= Sleepaway (game) =

Tabletop role-playing game

- Designers: Jay Dragon
- Publishers: Possum Creek Games
- Publication: 2019
- Genres: tabletop role-playing game, horror
- Systems: Belonging Outside Belonging

Sleepaway is a horror indie role-playing game by Jay Dragon about teenage counselors at a summer camp trying to protect misfit campers from a monster called the Lindworm that takes on the form of its victims. It has themes of trauma, LGBTQ community support, and non-binary gender exploration. Sleepaway was inspired by slasher films and the Belonging Outside Belonging game system by Avery Alder and Benjamin Rosenbaum.

Sleepaway was published by Possum Creek Games in 2019 after raising $14,407 on Kickstarter. It won a Spotlight Award at the 2020 ENNIE Awards and was nominated for Indie Game Developer Network awards for "Game of the Year" and "Most Innovative."

== Gameplay ==
Sleepaway is a rules-light storytelling game that does not use dice like traditional tabletop role-playing games. Instead, it uses a deck of cards with narrative prompts, a token system, weak and strong moves, and a series of rituals. The story is arranged in a three-act structure.

Character creation is based on emotional archetypes and jobs at the summer camp.

== Themes ==
One main theme of Sleepaway is how queer communities help each other deal with trauma. In the setting, the summer camp is supposed to be "a refuge for marginalized and alienated youths." The camp counselor player characters also went to this camp as children and experienced horrors in the woods just outside, which motivates them to protect their campers from enduring the same trauma.

Another theme is a creative approach to gender identity and expression. Instead of choosing a typical gender like male or female, players create custom genders for their characters by combining two words from a table, an adjective and a noun. This results in "gender options such as 'a rusted blade' and 'freight train'", encouraging players to think about characterization in new ways.
