= Avery Alder =

Role playing game designer

- Born: 1989 (age 36–37)
- Occupation: Game designer
- Notable work: Monsterhearts, The Quiet Year
- Awards: Indie RPG Awards

Avery Alder (b, 1989) is a Canadian tabletop role-playing game designer. She designs games with themes of LGBTQ self-discovery, community building, and post-apocalyptic survival.

== Background ==
Alder began playing role playing games at the age of 17.

== Game design and writing ==
Alder designs and writes indie role-playing games and is considered one of the "most prolific" game creators in the TTRPG realm. She designed The Quiet Year, a map-making game about community building. Her game Monsterhearts was one of the first published Powered by the Apocalypse games and an early example of a specifically queer themed tabletop role-playing game. Alder mentions that she wrote the game during the popularity of the Twilight series. Fans generated more than $95,000 to fund the second edition of the game.

For Dream Askew, Dream Apart, Alder and Rosenbaum created the Belonging Outside Belonging system.

Alder wrote a chapter called "Queer Storytelling and the Mechanics of Desire" in The Queer Games Avant-Garde: How LGBTQ Game Makers Are Reimagining the Medium of Video Games by Bonnie Ruberg. Alder's games have been used to teach social responsibility and decision making in secondary school classrooms.

Alder designs games with the philosophy that game mechanics for fictional worlds reveal the designer's beliefs about how similar systems work in the real world.

Alder has been invited to give workshops and present on game design across North America and Europe and her work is a topic of scholarship in the history of game design.

Alder also acts Design Consultant on other indie games, and has contributed to Thirsty Sword Lesbians and Yazeba's Bed and Breakfast.

=== Belonging Outside Belonging system ===
In collaboration with Benjamin Rosenbaum, Alder invented the Belonging Outside Belonging system, which became a template for future designers' games.

== Reception ==
=== Reviews and analysis ===
Ben Bisogno at the Kyoto City University of Art wrote an in-depth analysis of Alder's contributions to the development of role-playing games that don't use a gamemaster. In Transgression in Games and Play, scholars Sihvonen and Stenros draw parallels between how the game mechanics in Monsterhearts broke the norms of roleplaying games in 2012 and Alder's transgressive subject matter of "monstrosity, adolescence, and queerness." Kawitzky's Magic Circles: Tabletop role-playing games as queer utopian method explores Alder's Dream Askew's "intersections between queer theory, dys/utopian theory and the ‘Magic Circle’ in play theory." In No Dice, No Masters, Eric Stein analyses Alder's Belonging Outside Belonging system through the political philosophy of Jacques Rancière.

=== Awards and nominations ===
The Quiet Year won the 2013 Indie RPG Awards for "Most Innovative." The prototype for Dream Askew won the 2014 Indie RPG Awards for "Best Free Game."

Monsterhearts was nominated for the 2013 Origins Awards for Best Roleplaying Game. Dream Askew, Dream Apart was nominated for three 2019 ENNIE Awards: "Best Game," "Best Setting," and "Product of the Year."

In 2025, Alder won the Lizzie Magic Award which recognized her entire body of work.

=== Offshoots ===
The Belonging Outside Belonging system was later used for other designers' games like Wanderhome and Balikbayan. As of July 2024, Itch.io lists 211 products with the tag "Belonging Outside Belonging."

Critical Role played Monsterhearts on a special Valentines Day episode.

== Works ==
Title	Publisher	Credits	Date	Ref.
Ribbon Drive	Buried Without Ceremony	Designer	2009, 2011	
Monsterhearts	Buried Without Ceremony	Designer	2012	
Dream Askew, Dream Apart	Buried Without Ceremony	Designer (with Ben Rosenbaum)	2013, 2018	
The Quiet Year	Buried Without Ceremony	Designer	2013	
Variations on Your Body	Buried Without Ceremony	Designer	2014	
Monsterhearts 2	Buried Without Ceremony	Designer	2017	
Going For Broke	Buried Without Ceremony	Designer	2025	
