= Alone Against the Wendigo =

Call of Cthulhu adventure

Solitaire Adventure in Canada's Wilds
- First edition artwork by Dan & David Day, 1985.
- Designers: 1st edition; - Glen Rahman; - Jeff Okamoto; 2nd edition; - Glen Rahman; - Gavin Inglis
- Illustrators: 1st edition; - Dan Day; - David Day; - Tom Sullivan; 2nd edition; - Veronica Anrathi; - Kristina Carroll; - Lee Simpson
- Publishers: Chaosium
- Publication: 1985; 41 years ago
- Genres: Horror
- Systems: Basic Role-Playing
- ISBN: 978-1-56882-370-6

Alone Against the Wendigo, subtitled Solitaire Adventure in Canada's Wilds, is a solo adventure published by Chaosium in 1985 for the horror role-playing game Call of Cthulhu. Written by Glen Rahman, it is the first Call of Cthulhu solo adventure published, and as part of the plot the player character anthropologist Dr. L. C. Nadelmann travels deep into the wilds of Canada, facing challenges and an encounter with the Wendigo. Chaosium published an expanded second edition of the adventure in 2019 retitled Alone Against the Frost.

== Description ==
Alone Against the Wendigo is a Call of Cthulhu adventure gamebook for a single player, with no need for a referee. The reader starts on the first page, then is sent on a path through different numbered paragraphs; the path can vary widely depending on the decision the reader makes at the end of each paragraph.

=== Plot summary ===
The reader takes on the role of Dr. L. C. Nadelmann, an anthropologist from Miskatonic University. The doctor, accompanied by a local Métis guide and three graduate students, travels deep into the Canadian wilderness, seeking the mysterious North Hanninah valley. The doctor and companions will face many challenges, including an encounter with the Wendigo.

=== Gameplay ===
Blank Investigator sheets are provided. After choosing Dr. Nadelmann's gender, the player must then choose how to allocate 390 skill points, with at least 40 going towards Anthropology.

The player starts the adventure by reading the first paragraph of the adventure. All of the subsequent 654 paragraphs are individually numbered; much like the Fighting Fantasy series of adventure books published by Games Workshop, decisions made by the player, or succeeding or failing at luck, combat or skill dice rolls, will route the player to different paragraphs, providing a varying storyline depending on the choices, successes and failures the player makes.

At the end of each paragraph, the player is rewarded with a certain number of "Hanninah Mythos" ("HM") points, representing the knowledge the doctor has learned.

=== Victory conditions ===
The player can consider the game won if the doctor defeats the Wendigo, returns with all his party members alive, and is in possession of

- a map of the Golden Ledge
- the head of the Sasquatch
- and evidence of animal and plant life thought to have been extinct

=== Replays ===
The same player can replay the adventure over again to see what different decisions and successes or failures have on the storyline. If the doctor dies, the player can restart, the only requirement being that Dr. Nadelmann's skill points must be reallocated, and the doctor will only be credited with 1/5th of the HM points that the previous doctor earned before he died. If Dr. Nadelmann survived but only scored a partial victory, the player can send the doctor out into the wilderness again with the same character sheet and full accumulated HM points as well as renewed vigor, sanity and constitution scores.

== Publication history ==
2018 edition, cover art by Veronica Anrathi

Chaosium originally published the horror role-playing game Call of Cthulhu in 1981. Alone Against the Wendigo, published in 1985, was the game's first solo adventure, a 68-page softcover book with a removable cardstock insert designed by Glenn Rahman, with contributions by Jeff Okamoto, cover art by Dan Day and David Day, and interior art by the Days and Tom Sullivan. A numbering error was detected in the book after it was printed, and all references to entry 324 had to be manually crossed out and replaced by a rubber-stamped "364".

Chaosium quickly published a second solo adventure, Alone Against the Dark in 1985.

Descartes Editeurs published Seul Face au Wendigo, a slightly expanded French translation in 1985 that had 660 paragraphs (versus 654 in the original English edition).

Twenty years after its initial publication, Alone Against the Wendigo was rewritten and updated to 7th-edition Call of Cthulhu rules by Glenn Rahman with contributions by Gavin Inglis. This edition featured cover art by Veronica Anrathi, and interior art by Anrathi, Kristina Carroll and Lee Simpson. To avoid the cultural appropriation of "Wendigo", a significant term in some Canadian First Nations cultures, the new edition was retitled Alone Against the Frost.

== Reception ==
In the April 1986 edition of White Dwarf (Issue #76), Phil Frances noted that "Wendigo is [...] written in a style likely to enhance enjoyment." But he cautioned that "The adventure is very tough, and one game can be totally different from the last (although there are certain constant elements), so this is one solo that can be played over and over again. The possibilities are not easily exhausted, and it is a real challenge trying to succeed." Frances criticized the addition of Hanninah Mythos points, pointing out "the addition of Hanninah Mythos after each paragraph can break the action up, spoiling the atmosphere." He concluded by giving it an overall rating of 8 out of 10, saying, "The solo format works well for Call of Cthulhu, and I know that another such adventure is soon to be released. With a bit of luck, it won't be the last."

In the April 1986 edition of Adventurer (Issue 1), the reviewer found the adventure very challenging, noting, "Beset with mishap, misfortune or disaster from the start, you will need skill and luck to survive this adventure. Two failed skill rolls could result in the death of the whole party by the 4th paragraph, whilst a few more failed rolls could end up with the loss of the party, and with Dr. Nadelmann discredited, imprisoned and hated. All this without so much as an encounter with a wild animal!!" The reviewer concluded with a recommendation, saying, "It can be used over again and then possibly modified to be run as a group adventure, making it worth adding to your collection of Cthulhu regalia."

The French game magazine Jeux & Stratégie reviewed the French-language version published by Jeux Descartes and warned, "It goes without saying that luck will need to be on your side, and you will need to be strategic if you want to emerge unscathed, both physically and mentally." The review concluded, "We wish you good luck in advance, hoping you'll manage to get through these 660 paragraphs, some of which will send shivers down your spine, and that you'll still be with us for the next issue."

In Issue 54 of the French games magazine Casus Belli, Jean Balczesak called this "A good solo adventure, adventure gamebook style." Balczesak highly recommended this "for Keepers [gamemasters] who want to get a feel for Call of Cthulhu before embarking on their first game."

In Issue 11 of Dagon, Andrew Whittaker thought that this was clearly superior to The Warlock of Firetop Mountain, a popular adventure gamebook published by Games Workshop in 1982. Whittaker called the story itself "very good, and rolls along nicely." Whittaker did find some bugs in the book, but concluded by calling this book, "the best of its kind, but still not as nearly good as a regular [Call of Cthulhu] scenario. Go out and buy it, you have nothing to lose but your mind."

In Issue 43 of Abyss, John Davies called the game system "nice and flexible, allowing you to customize the character to a certain degree" but thought that the book should have used a stripped down version of Chaosium's Basic Role Playing system, saying, "even people completely unfamiliar with Call of Cthulhu could play this adventure and it could find a larger audience." Davies concluded, "Alone Against the Wendigo is a pretty good solo adventure. It is not as overwhelming or as grim as Alone Against the Dark, but can certainly provide a few hours of provocative solo adventuring."
