= Ironsworn =

Tabletop role-playing game

- Designers: Shawn Tomkin
- Illustrators: Joshua Meehan
- Publishers: Tomkin Press, Modiphius Entertainment
- Publication: 2018
- Genres: Universal, Fantasy, Science fiction
- Systems: Ironsworn, Powered by the Apocalypse

Ironsworn is an indie role-playing game written and self-published by Shawn Tomkin. Its Ironlands setting is low fantasy, set in a rugged frontier.

Ironsworn is distinct from most traditional tabletop role-playing systems for having a well-developed solo mode.

== Publication history ==
Ironsworn is an indie role-playing game designed by Shawn Tomkin. He said that the game was developed over a span of three years, while he was playtesting and collecting feedback from players in the Google+ tabletop role-playing community. He didn't expect the game to become successful.

=== In other languages ===
The German tabletop role-playing games publisher System Matters translated and published Ironsworn in 2021. The game was a commercial success for them, indicating interest for Ironsworn in the German-speaking tabletop role-playing games community.

In 2024, 500 Nuances de Geek, a small independent French publisher of games and books, started a campaign on Ulule, a French crowdfunding platform. The goal of the campaign was to translate and publish Ironsworn and Ironsworn: Starforged in French. Soon after starting the campaign, they released a free PDF, as the original English version is also available as a free download. In regard to Ironsworn, the goal of the campaign was to produce a printed edition, with almost identical contents to the free digital edition.

== Setting ==
Ironsworn is set in the Ironlands, a Greenland-adjacent, Norse-inspired low fantasy setting.

== System ==
=== Character creation ===
Player characters are built by allocating a specific number of points to the five different stats. These are edge, heart, iron, shadow, and wits.

Apart from the starting stats, there are also trackers for health, spirit, and supply.

Vows are the main mechanic by which a player can track progress and accomplish goals.

=== Gameplay ===
There are three ways to play Ironsworn.

- Guided: One or more players take the role of their characters, while a gamemaster (GM) moderates the session.
- Co-Op: One or more players play together to overcome challenges and complete quests. No GM required.
- Solo: One player portrays a lone character driven to fulfill vows in a dangerous world.

The solo and co-op modes of play are the main focus of the game. The mechanics of Ironsworn were intentionally designed around a refereeless style of play.

Tomkin took inspiration from the Powered by the Apocalypse system, among other systems. The player narrates the story and then makes Moves when it makes narrative sense. If for instance, the player is about to enter combat, they can make the Enter the Fray move. Dice are rolled to determine if the move is a success or a failure. The player accumulates Momentum through succeeding at rolls or through narrative. Momentum can be used to improve the result of a die roll. Experience can be gained by completing vows and then spent upgrading existing assets or gaining new ones.

=== Supplements ===
There are four official supplements that have been published by Shawn Tomkin.

- Ironsworn Lodestar (2018): A short reference guide that contains an oracle for character disposition and also alternative starting stats for easier and harder modes of play.
- Ironsworn: Delve (2020): The first major expansion adds additional content to the game, including dungeon-crawling mechanics.
- Ironsworn: Starforged (2022): Funded in a Kickstarter campaign, this is a new core rulebook adapting the original Ironsworn system to a science fiction setting. Along with the new setting, there are also new rules, assets, moves, and oracles.
- Ironsworn: Starforged Sundered Isles (2024): This supplement is an expansion for Starforged with a sailing setting (instead of spaceships), and require the core Ironsworn: Starforged rules to play.

== Reception and influence ==
=== Critical reception ===
Ironsworn was well-received by critics. Rob Wieland for Forbes named Ironsworn one of his favorite RPG products of 2022 and one of the best fantasy tabletop role-playing games for solo play. Anna Blackwell, writing for Tabletop Gaming, praised the mechanics for their elegance but pointed out that "progression feels a little stingy". She also gave Ironsworn her 2020 Game of the Year award. Writing for Teilzeithelden, Benjamin Dose pointed out that the Ironsworn rulebook isn't particularly attractive, heavily utilizing stock photos. However, he praised the game's originality and mechanics.

The game received the 2019 ENNIE Gold Winner Award for Best Free Game/Product.

=== Actual play ===
In season 2 of Me, Myself and Die!, a YouTube channel and series focusing on solo tabletop role-playing games, Canadian voice actor Trevor Devall is playing Ironsworn. Ironsworn and its sequel Ironsworn: Starforged were also played by the solitaire actual-play streamer Matt Risby on the channel The Bad Spot.

=== Influence ===
Aside from the rulebooks published by Tomkin Press, many other tabletop role-playing games appeared since Ironsworn's publishing that use rule systems inspired directly by Ironsworn. Examples include Iron Valley, a solo role-playing game intending to recreate the atmosphere of the video game Stardew Valley, or Sworn by Ghostlight, a gothic mystery tabletop RPG.

== See also ==
- Dungeon World
