= Ultraviolet Grasslands =

2020 tabletop role-playing game

The Ultraviolet Grasslands
- Softcover edition art by Luka Rejec; Winner of Silver at 2020 ENnie Awards "Best Cover Art"
- Designers: Luka Rejec
- Publishers: WizardThiefFighter Studio
- Publication: 2018
- Genres: Post-apocalyptic science fantasy role-playing

The Ultraviolet Grasslands, subtitled "Psychedelic Metal Roleplaying", is a post-apocalyptic science fantasy role-playing game setting published by indie publisher WizardThiefFighter Studio in 2018 in which a trade caravan treks across an unusual land.

== Description ==
The Ultraviolet Grasslands (UVG) is, in the words of GM historian Stu Horvath, "a road trip game [where] players travel in a surreal landscape in weathered caravans and strange machines ... players see cool things, meet interesting people, and sometimes, something wild happens." The characters start in the Violet City on the eastern edge of the grsslands, and make their way westward towards the mysterious Black City on the western edge of the map, although there is nothing in the game that forces the characters to make the Black City their ultimate destination. In an interview, designer Luka Rejec said characters have a chance to meet "strange ghosts of forgotten pasts, mind-controlling cats, multi-bodied post-humans trying to live forever, animated environmental suits swapping their minds with crystals, sentient (and carnivorous) plants, vast empty spaces, forgotten demigods, abandoned cities."

The characters are part of a trade caravan, and decide on which route they will take across the land. Traditional role-playing games such as Dungeons & Dragons use the "hex crawl" philosophy during overland travel, where each hex on a hex grid map is an opportunity for exploration, possibly revealing many encounters before reaching a destination. In UVG, the game uses a "pointcrawl" philosophy, where the adventure skips the travel and moves from one point to the next. Rather than concentrating on tents, rations and where to stop each night, the game only notes a dominant terrain (arid desert, forest, etc.) and moves to the destination. What is found at destination is the focus, rather than the journey to get there.

The 1st edition book contains 32 destinations, each of which has random tables for the gamemaster to use as story hooks. The 2nd edition adds several short adventures.

=== Gameplay ===
As part of the Old School Renaissance, UVG takes inspiration from the earliest role-playing games, using a rules-light system called SEACAT (Strength, Endurance, Agility, Charisma, Aura, Thought). Since it is a setting rather than a full role-playing game, the book is largely "system agnostic", and the few rules necessary for the setting can be "bolted onto" any role-playing game rules. In the 2nd edition, the SEACAT system was upgraded to a new system called Synthetic Dream Machine (SDM).

== Publication history ==
Luka Rejec was particularly inspired by both psychedelic metal music and the surrealistic mid-1970s Métal Hurlant (Heavy Metal) comics produced in the bande dessinée style by French artist Jean Giraud (under the pseudonym Mœbius). Rejec used these inspirations to design the role-playing game setting The Ultraviolet Grasslands, using his own artwork. Rejec released the first version in 2018 as a free PDF titled The Ultraviolet Grasslands and the Black City: A Psychedelic RPG Crawl. This was immediately followed by a Player's Guide, released by the indie role-playing game publisher WizardThiefFighter Studio. This was also translated into Polish and published by Trigalv Studio as Przewodnik Gracza: Psychodeliczna Gra RPG.

This was followed in 2019 by a new 200-page PDF titled UVG and the Black City, published by WizardThiefFighter Studios and Exalted Funeral.

A revised softcover version was released in 2020, as well as supplements Zoa of the Vastlands, Voyages of the Black Obelisk, Rrypo: Get Ahead, and Mushroom Kingdom of Umber.

In 2023, NEED GAMES! and WizardThiefFighter Studios published a second edition with new cover and interior artwork by Rejec.

Ultraviolet Grasslands was a contributing game in Itch.io's 2022 charity game bundle that raised $60,952 for Ukrainians affected by the Russo-Ukrainian War.

== Reception ==
Writing for Forbes, Rob Wieland commented, "There are moments of action and rounds of combat, but this game focuses on feeling less like Dungeons & Dragons and more like a psychedelic Oregon Trail." Wieland concluded, "The artwork feels like sketches from a member of the caravan that capture interesting details without being overly realistic. The routes chosen by players determine the overall storyline but random encounter tables can make memorable moments that were unexpected by anyone."

In his 2023 book Monsters, Aliens, and Holes in the Ground, RPG historian Stu Horvath noted that the setting had "settlements, environments, and mysterious locations ... Plenty of factions, all with their own strange wants and agendas, populate the world, as well." Horvath concluded, "The journey is the destination, the forward motion is the thing, and the soundtrack—the discover of mind-altering vistas deserves a sick mix rumbling in the background."

== Awards ==
2019 ENnie Awards:

- Original PDF: Silver for "Best Free Game or Product"

2020 ENnie Awards

- Softcover book: Gold for "Best Interior Art"
- Softcover book: Silver for "Best Cover Art"

2024 ENnie Awards:

- 2nd edition: Gold for "Best Interior Art"
