= Alone Against the Dark =

Call of Cthulhu adventure

Defying the Triumph of the Ice
- 1985 edition, cover by Krawczyk
- Designers: Matthew J. Costello
- Illustrators: Krawczyk
- Publishers: Chaosium
- Publication: 1985 1st edition; 2017 revised edition
- Genres: Horror
- Systems: Basic Role-Playing
- ISBN: 978-1568824536

Alone Against the Dark, subtitled "Defying the Triumph of the Ice", is an adventure published by Chaosium in 1985 for the horror role-playing game Call of Cthulhu, that was itself based on the works of H.P. Lovecraft. It was the second Call of Cthulhu solo adventure following Alone Against the Wendigo. The adventure received positive reviews in game periodicals of the time including White Dwarf, Different Worlds, and Space Gamer/Fantasy Gamer. Chaosium published a revised edition of the adventure in 2017.

== Description ==
=== Plot summary ===
Alone Against the Dark is a Call of Cthulhu adventure for a single player, with no need for a referee. The player takes on the role of Professor Louis Grunewald of Miskatonic University, who receives a wire from his friend T. Gliere, who has been jailed in Athens for stealing an archaeological artifact. The adventure will take the Investigator to Athens, Cairo, Bremen, and Antarctica.

=== Gameplay ===
Unlike other adventure books, which usually do not require outside resources or much preparation, this scenario requires a copy of the rules to Call of Cthulhu and polyhedral dice as well as in-game background material such as spell descriptions and the prices of equipment. Four pre-generated characters are provided, including the starting character, Professor Grunewald. Before play can begin, the player must first, using a blank character sheet that is provided, allocate a pool of points to the professor's skills, and a further 150 points to science skills such as Archaeology, Astronomy, and History. As critic Michał Misztal noted, "The ability to connect the dots is essential when making decisions about the investigators' actions, and equipping them with good observation skills or knowledge of psychology, useful when interrogating witnesses, can prove just as important as a sharp eye and steady fists. ".

If Professor Grunewald is killed, the player moves on to the second pre-generated character, one of Grunewald's friends, the wealthy financier Ernest Hold, to continue the adventure. If Hold dies, he is replaced by Nora McShane, ace reporter for the New York Daily Sun. She is replaced by U.S. Navy Lieutenant Devon Wilson. If all four characters die, the adventure is over and the player must restart a new game with Professor Grunewald. The game is very time-dependent, and the loss of a character will penalize the player several days of game time until the successor is ready to take up the investigation.

The player starts the adventure by reading the first paragraph of the adventure. All of the subsequent paragraphs are individually numbered; much like the Fighting Fantasy series of adventure books published by Games Workshop, decisions made by the player, or succeeding or failing at combat or skill dice rolls, will route the player to different paragraphs, providing a varying storyline depending on the choices, successes and failures the player makes.

== Publication history ==
2017 revised edition, cover art by Petr Štovik

Chaosium originally published the horror role-playing game Call of Cthulhu in 1981. The first solo adventure, Alone Against the Wendigo was published in 1985, and was quickly followed the same year by a second solo adventure, Alone Against the Dark, a 82-page softcover book designed by Matthew J. Costello with artwork by Krawczyk.

In 2017, Alone Against the Dark was rewritten, expanded to 102 pages, and revised for the 7th edition of Call of Cthulhu by Matthew J. Costello and Mike Mason, with interior artwork by Dean Engelhardt, Loïc Muzy, and Jonathan Wyke, and cover art by Petr Štovik.

== Reception ==
In the May 1986 edition of White Dwarf (Issue #77), Phil Frances was complimentary, noting, "Alone Against The Dark builds on the pattern of its predecessor, Alone Against the Wendigo, to further expand the horizons of lone adventuring. In fact it gets closer to 'true' role-playing than any other solo I can think of." Frances also liked the introductory paragraph provided for each Investigator, commenting that it "portrays them well enough for us to get a good idea of their personality, and adds welcome touches of flavour." He also liked the innovation that the player can leave the storyline for periods of time to buy supplies or rest. Frances concluded by giving this adventure an excellent overall rating of 9 out of 10, saying, "Alone Against the Dark encourages strategic play; careful planning of daily schedules is required to make the best of the limited time available."

In the November–December 1986 edition of Different Worlds (Issue #44), William A. Barton thought that Alone Against the Dark was even better than its predecessor, Alone Against the Wendigo, commenting that if designer Matthew Costello "hasn't yet perfected the genre, he's come very close with The Dark." Barton welcomed the addition of the telephone as an investigative tool, pointing out that "Since the investigators are, unknown to them, running against a sinister deadline [...] such a time-saving device is a welcome way to obtain additional information." Barton's only criticism of the adventure was the artwork, which he found "sketchy". He concluded by giving the adventure an excellent rating of 4.5 out of 5, saying, "Pick this one up at all costs — unless you absolutely hate solos, or don't play Cthulhu. And if you manage to complete it with fewer than the four Investigators provided, give yourself a pat on the back — or whatever piece of anatomy is left on your Investigator after the Old Ones and their minions finish with him."

In the February–March 1987 edition of Space Gamer/Fantasy Gamer (Issue No. 77), Lawrence Person commented "All in all, a thoughtful and engrossing adventure. Recommended for all COC players, and highly recommended for those who like Call of Cthulhu but can't find a regular campaign to play in."

In Issue 37 of Abyss, Carl Jones called this "a game which you should never really play alone, at least not if you value your sanity." Jones was struck by the art by Krawczyk, calling it "amazing. I can't imagine what they paid this fellow or where they found him, but he is not just another illustrator. He is a genuine artist and his work captures the feeling of the horror which is the world of H.P. Lovecraft in a way achieved by few others." Jones called the adventure itself "well structured." Jones concluded, "More than any adventure I've seen for Call of Cthulhu to date, this adventure really captures the feel of the game, though one result of this is that playing the scenario can be extremely depressing, but that is the nature of the setting which Lovecraft created."

In Issue 140 of the Polish game magazine Rebel Times, Michał Misztal reviewed the Polish version created for the seventh edition of Call of Cthulhu, and found the artwork "quite striking. From the impressive illustration on the cover to the photos, drawings, and diagrams placed next to the relevant paragraphs, the manual's visuals really help us immerse ourselves in the atmosphere of mystery and dangerous adventure." Misztal pointed out that, unlike most paragraph-based adventure books where the reader can immediately start without preparation or other resources, Alone Against the Darkness required the Call of Cthulhu rule book, a price list for goods, spell descriptions, and blank character sheets. Misztal also warned that "Due to its complexity, rather intricate investigation, and horror theme, it is definitely a title for mature players." Despite this, Misztal noted "The adventure is captivating, and even after losing, it's hard to resist another attempt to discover the ending." Misztal concluded, "Alone Against the Darkness offers participation in an exciting and challenging story ... I recommend it to all fans of the Call of Cthulhu storyline, as well as those just wanting to get acquainted with it. Fans of paragraph-based games will also be satisfied, provided they accept the more complex than usual mechanics and the need to prepare additional materials."
