= Modiphius Entertainment =

British game company

Modiphius Entertainment Ltd.
- Type: Private
- Industry: Game company
- Founded: 2012; 14 years ago in London
- Founders: Chris Birch, Rita Birch
- Headquarters: London, UK
- Owners: Chris Birch (45%); Marharyta Kokhna (45%); Michael Cross (5%); Robin Harris (5%)
- Website: www.modiphius.net

Modiphius Entertainment Ltd. is a tabletop role-playing game and board game publisher based in Fulham, London that is known for licensed adaptations of established media. Notable titles include Star Trek Adventures, Fallout: The Roleplaying Game, Dune: Adventures in the Imperium, Terry Pratchett’s Discworld: Adventures in Ankh-Morpork, and the Mass Effect board game.

== History ==
Modiphius was founded in 2012 by husband-wife team Rita and Chris Birch to publish their first game, Achtung! Cthulhu. The company have since published a number of product lines based on independent licenses and established brands.

== Games ==
=== Achtung! Cthulhu ===
In 2013 the company raised £177,000 through Kickstarter to create Achtung! Cthulhu, a tabletop RPG set in the Second World War inspired by the work of H.P. Lovecraft. The first series of adventures for Achtung! Cthulhu is called "Zero Point," with the first two chapters called "Three Kings" and "Heroes of the Sea" by Sarah Newton. The game was well-received in the RPG community, and won several awards, including Best Roleplaying Game at the 2014 UK Games Expo. In 2018 a videogame based on the franchise - called Achtung! Cthulhu Tactics - was released by Auroch Digital.

=== Mutant Chronicles ===
In 2013 Modiphius released the 3rd edition of popular post-apocalyptic RPG Mutant Chronicles.

=== Fallout ===
In 2017 the company acquired the license for Bethesda property Fallout and in 2018 released Fallout: Wasteland Warfare, a tabletop wargame featuring characters and settings from the videogame series. The company announced in 2019 that they would be working on an RPG expansion to Fallout: Wasteland Warfare to be released in the same year.

Modiphius developed a Fallout tabletop RPG using their 2d20 system, called Fallout: The Roleplaying Game. The game entered beta in 2019 with a projected release in 2020, but was delayed due to the COVID-19 pandemic. Fallout: The Roleplaying Game released digitally in March 2021, with a physical release in July the same year.

In 2026 Modiphius released a solo tabletop role-playing game adapted from the Fallout: The Roleplaying Game ruleset called Fallout: Wasteland Wanderer.

=== Star Trek Adventures ===
In 2017 the company released their first edition of Star Trek Adventures, an RPG series based on the television series Star Trek. In 2024 the company released the quick start guide for the second edition of Star Trek Adventures as a free PDF. The full core rules for the second edition released in August 2024 at Gen Con.

=== Dune: Adventures in the Imperium ===
In May 2021, Modiphius released Dune: Adventures in the Imperium, based on the Dune fanchise. It won a Gold ENNIE Award for "Best Writing" with a writing team including Banana Chan. It was also nominated for "Product of the Year.". Modiphius announced an expansion, Fall of the Imperium, in 2024.

=== Discworld ===
In February 2024, Modiphius acquired the license to produce Terry Pratchett’s Discworld: Adventures in Ankh-Morpork. Modiphius launched a Kickstarter campaign to fund the project in October 2024.

=== Mass Effect ===
In 2024, Modiphius announced pre-orders for a Mass Effect board game.

=== Other franchises ===
- In 2014 the company released Thunderbirds, a co-operative board game designed by Matt Leacock based on the British children's TV show Thunderbirds.
- In 2015, the company announced a licensing deal for Robert E. Howard's Conan the Barbarian property, with the publication of a roleplaying game, Conan: Adventures in an Age Undreamed Of, and an ongoing line of supplements in that setting.
- In 2018 the company announced they would be working with DreamWorks Animation to produce a board game based on the children's films Kung Fu Panda.
- In 2018, they announced a John Carter of Mars roleplaying game and line of supporting material, based on the early-1900s pulp science fantasy series by Edgar Rice Burroughs.
- In 2022, they collaborate with Shawn Tomkin, Ironsworn creator, to publish a deluxe edition of its sci-fi supplement, Starforged.
