= Uncaged (anthology) =

Dungeons & Dragons adventures

- Cover of Uncaged: Volume I with art by Samantha Darcy.
- Uncaged: Volume I; Uncaged: Volume II; Uncaged: Volume III; Uncaged: Volume IV; Uncaged: Goddesses
- Edited by: Ashley Warren
- Country: United States
- Language: English
- Genre: Dungeons & Dragons; Epic fantasy
- Publisher: Dungeon Masters Guild
- Published: 2019 - 2022
- Media type: Digital, Print on demand
- No. of books: 5
- Website: www.uncagedanthology.com

Uncaged is an adventure anthology series for the 5th edition of the Dungeons & Dragons fantasy role-playing game. Each volume contains various adventures which feature the subversion of classic female mythological creature and monster tropes. The project was created by Ashley Warren and features the work of over 100 writers, illustrators, and editors.

Four collections, titled Uncaged: Volume I through Uncaged: Volume IV, were published in 2019 and 2020. A fifth volume, titled Uncaged: Goddesses, was published in 2022. The books were published on the Dungeon Masters Guild (DMs Guild) under the open game license; they are not considered "official" Dungeons & Dragons material.

== Contents ==
Volumes I-III each contain 25 different one-shot Dungeons & Dragons adventures which range in difficulty tier. Volume IV contains 16 one-shot adventures which range in difficulty tier, a "Grimoire" section which contains various character options such as a new character class, spells and magic items, and section dedicated to the making-of the series. The adventures are myth and folklore themed and center around subverting the tropes of female mythological creatures and monsters.

Uncaged: Goddesses contains 21 one-shot adventures of the Tier 4 difficulty along with 27 monster stat blocks, eight pre-generated player characters for Tier 4, and advice for Dungeon Masters running adventures at the highest difficulty tier. Each adventure features an evil- or neutral-aligned goddess from an official Dungeons & Dragons pantheon.

== Publication history ==
All volumes in the series were self-published on the Dungeon Masters Guild (DMs Guild) with the option to be purchased as a PDF or as a hardcover book; the digital edition contains a printer friendly version of each adventure module. The 238-page first volume was published in March 2019. The 236-page second volume was published in July 2019. The 239-page third volume was published in October 2019. The 218-page fourth volume was published in February 2020.

A fifth volume in the series, Uncaged: Goddesses, was announced in June 2021 and published in February 2022; this volume is 297 pages.

=== Development ===
In August 2018, Ashley Warren announced that she was seeking submissions for an upcoming Dungeons & Dragons adventure anthology which would feature a "unique, feminist approach to classic archetypes". Christian Hoffer, for ComicBook.com in August 2018, reported that "one of the underlying goals of the upcoming anthology seems to be repurposing these monsters and moving them away from their misogynist origins. [...] This doesn't mean that the monsters will necessarily be good or sympathetic - just that their motivations won't necessarily be crafted from a male perspective".

In an interview on EN World, Warren stated that "I shared the idea on Twitter and it totally took off. It was pretty clear to me that the project would be better if there were more people involved, so I put out a call for submissions and received more than 100. Our cover artist and creative director, Samantha Darcy, joined early on and has played a substantial role in the general aesthetic of the book. DMs Guild, which is where we had already planned to publish the book, also reached out to us early on to do a hardcover version". Warren commented that the huge number of submissions led to the project being expanded from a single book into a multiple volume series. Kelly Knox, for Geek & Sundry, highlighted that "the majority of contributors in Uncaged are women or non-binary writers and artists from around the world".

A new call for submissions went out in June 2021 for Uncaged: Goddesses. Gwen Bassett, project lead for Uncaged: Goddesses, commented that the first four volumes were 50% Tier 1 adventures which led to the fifth volume being exclusively Tier 4 adventures.

== Reception ==
Christian Hoffer, in a review of Uncaged: Volume I for ComicBook.com, commented that "for the size, scope, and relatively quick turnaround time [...], Uncaged is an impressively organized book with professional quality layouts and editing. [...] Whether you enjoy a good monster story or are looking for some quick adventures for your D&D party, Uncaged is a fantastic anthology and is one of the best publications we've seen released on the DMs Guild in quite some time". Hoffer highlighted that the game encounters feature "interesting characters that often subvert popular tropes about female monsters. [...] Many of the stories carry deeper meaning - adventures about generational divides, cultural sexism, and overcoming prejudices and traditional views both within the world of D&D and around the gaming table. [...] Many of the adventures reward exploration and social interactions and don't necessarily end with a combat encounter".

In April 2019, Andrew Girdwood, for Geek Native, commented that Uncaged: Volume I was already a Dungeon Masters Guild "Platinum best seller" and that "at the time of writing, only 0.6% of all books at DMs Guild have reached Platinum status and only 0.24% have done better". Girdwood highlighted that Uncaged: Volume I showcases non-Western creatures and called the adventures "thoughtfully provocative". Girdwood wrote that "dozens of different people have written and contributed to each of these scenarios, and so each one is fresh and original. [...] I was especially thankful for the consistent layout and structure for each adventure [...]. The art in the supplement is strong too". Jamie O'Duibhir, for SyFy Wire in May 2019, commented that "on March 12, 2019, the DMs Guild exploded when Uncaged Vol. 1 premiered. [...] In just two months, the book sold 2,500 copies as a self-published work on a platform dedicated to selling products for D&D".

Uncaged: Volume I was included on "The Best of the Dungeon Masters Guild" list in issue #25 of Dragon+ — the article states that the adventures are "nicely spread out" in difficulty ranges. It highlights that the book "subverts the traditions that bubble up through our collective unconscious, daring to give new life to old tales. These re-imaginings challenge players and DMs alike to reexamine familiar tropes. [...] While the unique content excites the storyteller in us, what drew our attention was the spirit of collaboration that went into this publication. The twenty-six narrative designers creating the adventures worked alongside just as many artists, editors, cartographers, and others who all played a role in bringing this supplement to fruition".

In a review of the second volume, Hoffer wrote that "Uncaged: Volume II is a fantastic publication and features some of the best short D&D adventures we've read this year. The book also features some gorgeous artwork that really bring to life the melancholy, danger, and tragedy of the monsters featured in the anthology". Hoffer commented that "many of the adventures involve solving untimely deaths or uncovering disturbing mysteries, while others show less dangerous sides to the monsters at the heart of their story. While many of the adventures can devolve into combat encounters, I appreciated that most of the stories in this volume of Uncaged involve investigation and exploration instead of simple 'kill this thing' quests".

Riley Silverman, in a review of the first two volumes for SyFy Wire, called the formatting of series "super simple for a DM" as it breaks "down the segments into prep text and what should be given to the players, with easy to follow instructions for the various map positions" and highlighted the upfront presentation of content warnings for each adventure. Silverman wrote that "though designed as individual stories and not a single campaign, the book features adventures designed for character levels from 1-20" – the modular nature allows a Dungeon Master to add individual adventures into their own campaign or "string a few of them together" to create a campaign. Silverman commented that Uncaged is a supplement and "not a stand-alone sourcebook" even though "some of the modules do provide stats for monsters or characters featured in them [...] Still, if you're a newbie DM looking for some simple to run quests to follow up the D&D Starter Set, or an experienced gamer just hoping for a fun collection of interesting stories to run, this book has something for you".

=== Awards and nominations ===
Year	Award	Category	Work	Result	Ref.
2019	ENNIE Awards	Best Electronic Book	Uncaged: Volume I	Nominated	
2020	ENNIE Awards	Best Electronic Book	Uncaged: Volume III	Silver Winner	
2022	ENNIE Awards	Best Adventure	Uncaged: Goddesses	Gold Winner	
2022	ENNIE Awards	Best Art, Cover	Uncaged: Goddesses	Silver Winner	
2022	ENNIE Awards	Best Art, Interior	Uncaged: Goddesses	Nominated	
2022	ENNIE Awards	Product of the Year	Uncaged: Goddesses	Nominated	
