= Thousand Year Old Vampire =

One-player tabletop role-playing game

- Designers: Tim Hutchings
- Publishers: Self-published, Petit Guignol
- Publication: 2020
- Genres: solo tabletop role-playing game, storytelling game, journal-writing game
- Players: 1
- Skills: writing, storytelling

Thousand Year Old Vampire is a one-player tabletop role-playing game self-published by Tim Hutchings in 2019 in which the player describes the life of a vampire via a journal of memories.

== Description ==
Thousand Year Old Vampire (TYOV) varies from other solitaire role-playing games such as the solo adventures of Tunnels & Trolls and the Fighting Fantasy adventure books, which used a series of numbered paragraphs, sending the player on a path through the adventure depending on what decisions are made at nexus points. Instead, TYOV uses an approach in which the player, prompted by words and phrases from the game rules, writes a journal describing the life of a vampire.

The player first creates the vampire from a collection of keywords:

- Skills, each of which can only be used once
- Resources owned by the vampire such as a castle or a ship
- Characters who will interact with the vampire

Memories, and forgetting Memories, are the central part of the game; the vampire only has room for five Memories, which are each composed of three Experiences. As RPG historian Stu Horvath wrote, "Experiences are single evocative sentences that, when collected, describes one moment, event, object, or person of importance."

The life of the vampire starts as the player responds to Prompt #1 with the first journal entry, turning the prompt into a written incident. The player then rolls dice to determine which numbered Prompt is next and responds to the new Prompt by writing the next part of the vampire's story. Prompts vary in form, sometimes giving a new Skill; sometimes asking a question, which then must be journaled as an Experience; and sometimes instructing the vampire to kill a Character, use a Skill, or abandon a Resource.

Once a vampire has five Memories, the vampire can write up to four of them in a diary, meaning the vampire physically cannot recall the memories even when reading about them in the diary. If, in the game, the vampire loses their diary, all of the Memories in the diary are lost as well.

The game ends when the vampire has lost all Memories.

Rebekah Krum theorizes that the game's central question is what to do with immortality and power.

== Publication history ==
Tim Hutchings created Thousand Year Old Vampire in 2019 and self-published it as a PDF. After a Kickstarter campaign crowdsourced enough money, a hardcover edition was published by Petit Guignol that Stu Horvath describes as looking like "a Mysterious Old Book with a leather spine, marbled end papers, and evocative collages of ephemera inside."

== Reception ==
Writing for Forbes, Rob Wieland commented, "the physical book is a fantastic artifact ... the pages are stuffed with real and imagined marginalia that make the whole book feel like a madman's journal found in a hidden room of a creepy old mansion." Wieland noted that the randomness of the game meant, "Every prompt changes the state of the game and there are plenty of moments where a character is sitting pretty one moment and the next a rival Immortal shows up to wreck the vampire's carefully laid plans." Wieland, writing this during the COVID pandemic, concluded, "Thousand Year Old Vampire can be played over a couple of hours or a couple of weeks and can turn the isolation and strangeness we're all feeling right now into an unforgettable story."

Writing for Gamers with Glasses, Jason Mical questioned whether this solo game qualified as an RPG, "but the more I reflected on it, I realized it absolutely does, and does so in a way that may require us to fundamentally change how we view the genre ... It's ingenious and inspiring." Mical came away enthralled with the game, writing, "I highly recommend TYOV for anyone looking for a guided storytelling experience and has a little bit of time to invest in the writing." Mical concluded, "The more you put into this game, the more you get out of it, and you may very well find yourself writing 10,000 words or more. It will be worth it."

In his 2023 book Monsters, Aliens, and Holes in the Ground, RPG historian Stu Horvath commented, "Forgetting is the central torture of the game. Crossing out Memories ... is an unexpected agony." Horvath went on to say "There are horrible traumas that happen ... but there are beautiful moments too, as well as dramatic, happy, and tragic ones." Horvath did point out that "The prompts are sometimes untidy, like real-life, leading to momentary fancies and puzzling dead ends that never yield resolutions." Horvath noted that if the vampire loses the diary and all the Memories it contains, "A loss of that magnitude feels like, well, being stabbed in the heart."

== Awards ==
- 2020 IndieCade Awards: Winner in the category "Tabletop Design"
- 2020 ENNIE Awards:
  - Gold in the categories "Best Production Values" and "Best Rules"
  - Silver for "Product of the Year"
