= Solo role-playing game =

Type of role-playing games

Solo role-playing games are tabletop and live-action role-playing games that can be played by a single person, without the participation of other players or a gamemaster. The term typically does not include single-player computer role-playing games. Solo role-playing games may be either designed from the ground-up to be played by a single person, or they may exist as modes or supplements for role-playing games otherwise requiring multiple people for play. Solo role-playing games are part of a wider range of single-person game-like activities, such as solo board and card games or solo wargames.

Even though role-playing games are typically thought of as exclusively social activities, the practice of solo role-playing has existed since the earliest years of the hobby, with a solo ruleset for original Dungeons & Dragons first appearing in 1975.

== Purpose ==
Role-playing games are often considered predominantly or exclusively social activities. People are typically introduced to board games and role-playing games in social contexts, creating an assumption that they necessitate social presence. The difficulty of recruiting both a gamemaster and other players was one of the early pushes for the development of the genre, leading to first experiments with solo role-playing soon after tabletop role-playing's first emergence.

Solo role-playing games have both scheduling and narrative flexibility. Some players may want to experience solo role-playing games on their own terms, not simply as a replacement or enhancement of the traditional role-playing experience. They may be interested in the gameplay mechanics and style unique to a solo role-playing game, or the more introspective and therapeutic experience of playing alone. Brendan Hesse of Lifehacker highlighted that solo TTRPGs "run the gamut of settings and playstyles" and while it is a "different experience", solo games combine "the tactile feel of dice rolls and imagination-driven approach of group-based tabletop gaming, with the pick-up-and-play nature of single-player video games". The use of solo role-playing games has been explored as a tool for teaching literature and family business management.

== Gameplay elements ==
There exist a wide variety of activities that can be considered solo role-playing games, suitable for different preferences. Just like with other kinds of role-playing games, they express a wide variety in structure and game mechanics. However, there are some elements that are particularly characteristic of solo role-playing games.

=== Oracles ===
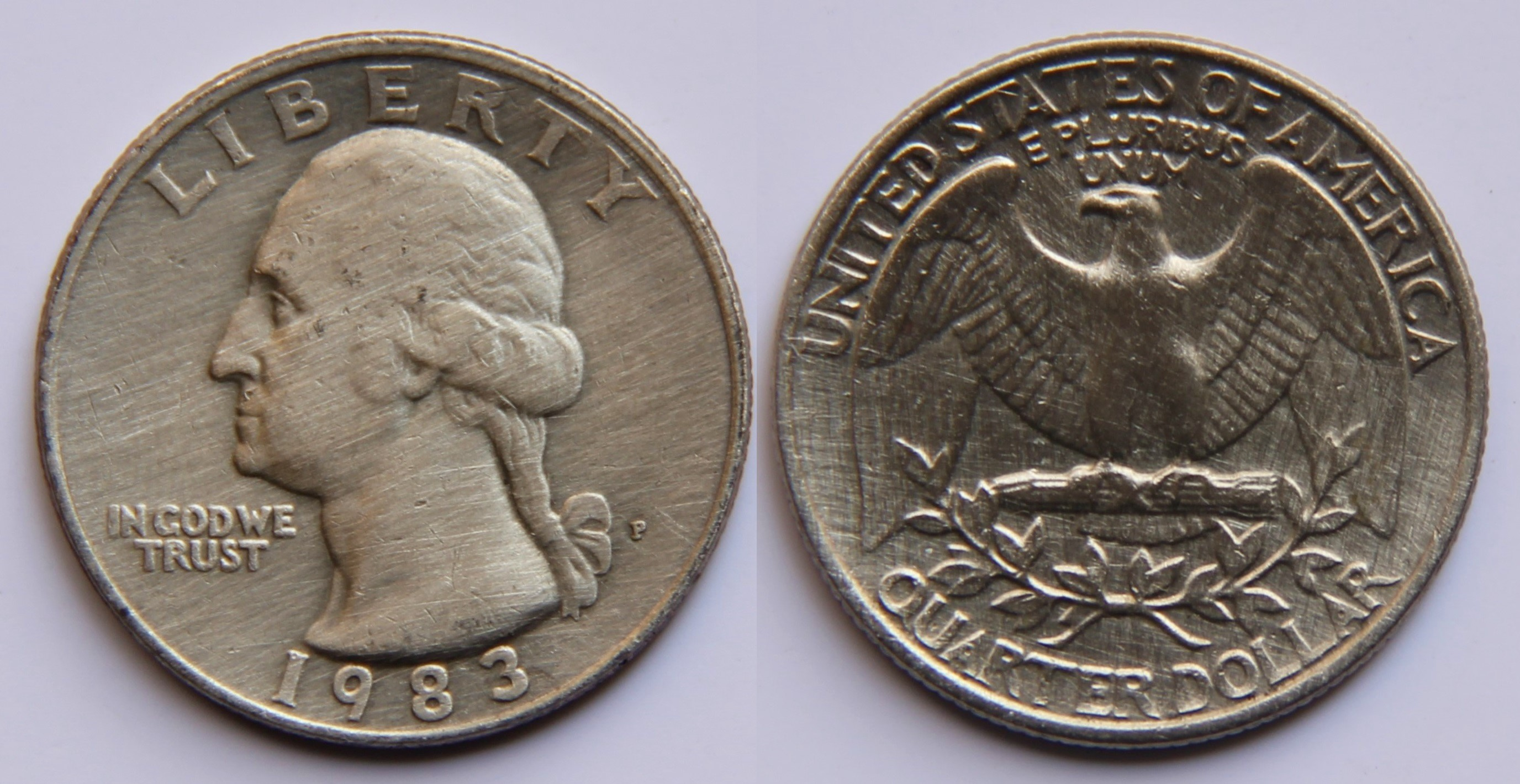
A coin can serve as a primitive oracle, providing random answers to yes-no questions

An oracle, also called a gamemaster emulator, is a mechanism used to answer questions about the game world through randomness, for example with dice rolls or card draws. Typically, oracles operate by providing an answer to a yes-no question posed by the player, much like the Magic 8 Ball and similar methods of divination. Oracles can range in sophistication from simple coin tosses to systems of random tables adjusting probabilities based on previous game states. Software implementations of oracle systems exist.

While oracles are frequently an integral part of a solo role-playing game's ruleset, they can also be sold as stand-alone products aimed at facilitating GM-less gameplay in role-playing games that may otherwise need a gamemaster to run the game or for providing additional assistance to gamemasters running such games.

=== Paragraph-based gameplay ===
A paragraph-based game is a kind of game in which interactions with text constitute the main or the only form of gameplay. If the narrative fragments provided by the game interact with other game elements in some way, the game can be said to be paragraph-enhanced.

Gamebooks are a prominent category of paragraph-based games.

=== Journaling ===
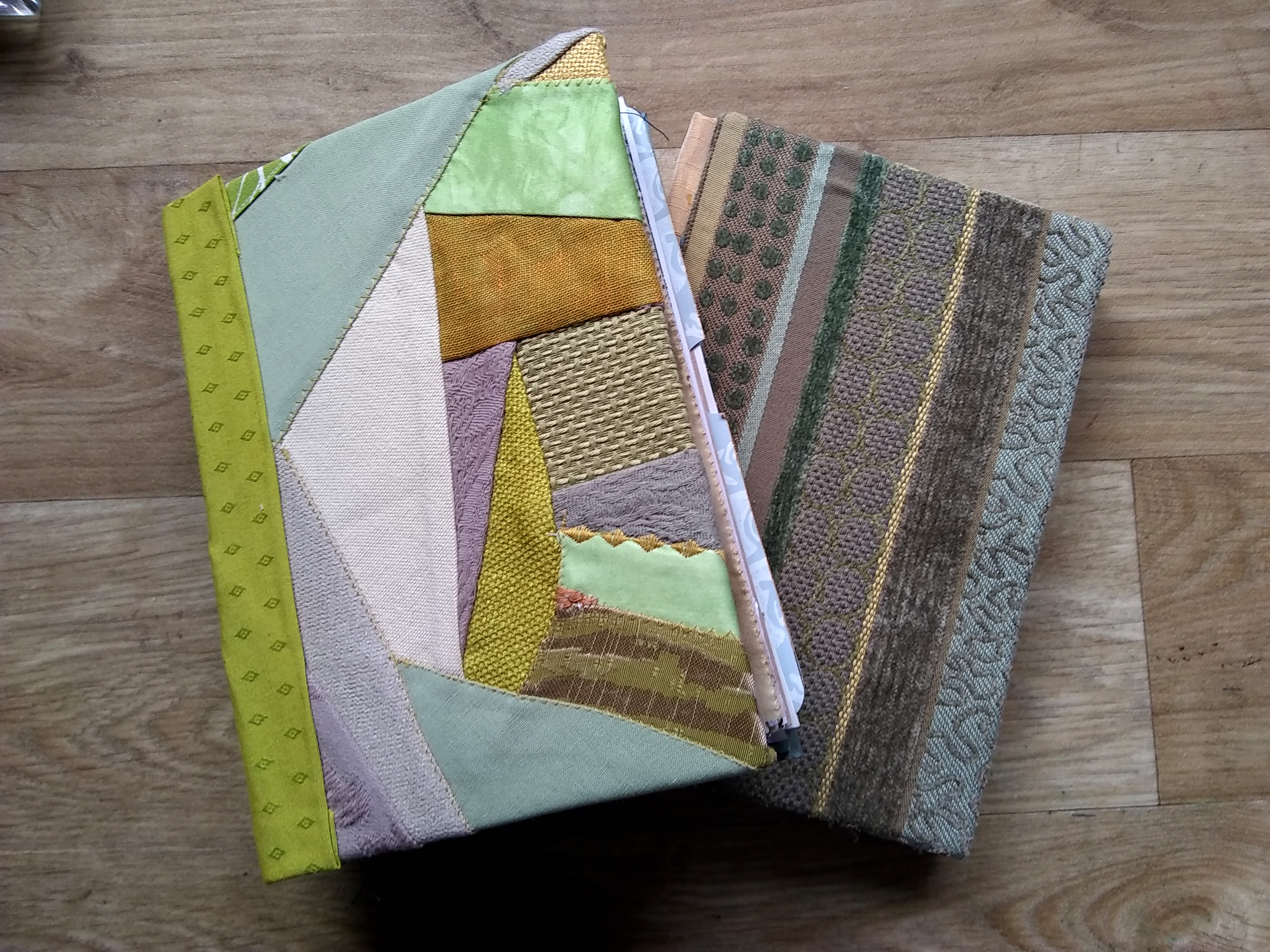
Players may be required to supply their own journal to play a solo role-playing game

Academic Jessica Hammer and Paul Czege explained that "journaling games are a conceptual grouping of single-player games" where writing is a central gameplay element. They highlighted "these games exist as formal, published documents", noting "as of 2023, there were 1,092 journaling games downloadable on the indie publishing site itch.io".

While "journaling" typically refers to the literal recording of game events in a journal or a notebook, some games experiment with the concept. Some games might require the player to record real events alongside fictional ones, or blend them together. A "journal" may also take a variety of forms, from textual entries on a paper or digital medium, to marks on the player's skin. While journaling games typically prompt written responses, they may also incorporate other creative practices such as drawing, embroidery or others.

=== Map addition ===
Map addition is the process of adding to the map as it is explored. This mechanic introduces uncertainty into exploration. This mechanic has been used in solo role-playing since its earliest days, particularly in dungeon-crawlers. For example, a 1975 issue of TSR's The Strategic Review contained the feature "Solo Dungeon Adventures", describing the rules for using dice to randomly generate underground passages, chambers, traps, adversaries, and plunder as the player explored a dungeon. While these rules allow the player to map-out a location with a high level of detail, games with less focus on tactical combat may provide rules for "lower-resolution" map exploration, adding locations to a bigger map, but only providing general descriptions of the locations themselves.

== History ==
Solo role-playing games can be traced back to the emergence of tabletop role-playing in the 1970s United States. The original Dungeons & Dragons tabletop role-playing game, published in 1974, already anticipated the possibility of solo role-playing in some respects. The game contained rules for playing on the map that came with the board game Outdoor Survival, as well as charts for determining encounters, which effectively eliminated the need for a gamemaster's oversight. A year later, in 1975, TSR, Inc., the original publishers of Dungeons & Dragons, published the feature "Solo Dungeon Adventures" by Gary Gygax in the first issue of The Strategic Review, a precursor to the Dragon magazine. The article acknowledged the possibility of playing Dungeons & Dragons solo using the Outdoor Survival map, but pointed out that there was no uniform method for dungeon exploration. To fix this, the article provided tables for random dungeon generation.

The next year, in 1976, the Buffalo Castle dungeon adventure was published for the Tunnels & Trolls role-playing game, which was the first stand-alone solo role-playing product on the market. Buffalo Castle's innovation was combining a dungeon description with a gamebook format. This helped provide a more directed experience to those players, who felt that randomly generated dungeons were too chaotic. Steve Jackson reviewed Buffalo Castle in The Space Gamer No. 9, writing "If you're into role-playing, you'll enjoy Buffalo Castle. If you're into solo role-playing, buy it." Starting in 1982, Steve Jackson (not the same person as the previously mentioned Steve Jackson) and Ian Livingstone would go on to create and publish Fighting Fantasy. Much like Buffalo Castle, Fighting Fantasy books combined the gamebook format with tabletop role-playing game mechanics. The books soon proved to be very popular, holding the top three spots of The Sunday Times bestseller list in March 1983. Many other similar role-playing gamebook series, such as Lone Wolf, would start being published around the same period.

Early experimentation with refereeless play led to the development of computerized D&D implementations, linking the early history of solo role-playing to the emergence of role-playing video games. In an early issue of Alarums and Excursions, an article by Mark Leymaster described a computer program for generating random dungeons, which he intended for "running automatic dungeons" and potential play-by-mail games. The dungeons generated by this simulator were described entirely through natural language, rather than a graphical map. At various points, the script prompted the player to resolve an encounter or roll a die. It was structured this way because the generated dungeon was intended to be printed out and used as a script for a solo game, rather than being run interactively at the mainframe, which would have been prohibitively expensive at the time. Flying Buffalo eventually used similar techniques in a service called Computer-Generated Dungeon. During a brief period from 1977 to 1978, players were able to order a computer-generated solo adventure for their Tunnels & Trolls system. The prose was human-written but randomly reordered by a computer algorithm to provide a variety of experiences. Some elements of customization were offered to players who ordered a solo adventure: they could select the name of the monster and customize the text in the footer.

=== Mid-2010s to present ===
Tabletop role-playing as a whole experienced a huge surge in popularity in the mid-2010s, evolving from a niche hobby to a massively popular pastime. One of the reasons for the increased popularity of role-playing games in the 2010s was the rise of actual play content. Academic Shelly Jones wrote that players and designers developed "new forms of text-based online freeform role-playing" in parallel with the written gameplay session reports on The Forge, commenting that "textual role-playing has flourished" through the recent growth of solo journaling role-playing games. Academic Evan Torner traced the development and impact of online indie role-playing game designer and theorist communities, noting that after 2006 the community fragmented into what became known as The Forge diaspora; social media joined "forums, podcasts, and blogs". Torner explained a "sizable community" joined Google+ in 2011 and, after the platform collapsed in 2019, there was "a sudden exodus to two specific, industry-changing platforms: Twitter (now known as X) and itch.io". Both Jones and Sarah Lynne Bowman et al. highlighted itch.io as facilitating the growth of solo role-playing games. Torner argued that "Twitter democratized theory discussions" and "Itch.io permitted creators to sell their works of theory and design easily and directly to their constituent audiences".

The COVID-19 pandemic that began in December 2019 and spread globally resulted in social distancing measures being instituted nearly worldwide. Due to the inability to pursue social recreation during this period, many people had to seek comparable alternatives or new hobbies that can be enjoyed within the imposed restrictions. Rowan Zeoli, for Polygon, explained that solo tabletop games "started in earnest with wargames in the [1980s]" and slowly rose "in prominence for the next few decades until the quarantine period of the ongoing COVID pandemic offered a perfect moment for board games and TTRPGs". While many people found online video games or virtual tabletops, many chose solo role-playing.

Games also got more experimental with mechanics and themes. For solo role-playing games this meant the rise of the journaling game genre. Katie Wickens of GamesRadar+ noted that many of the earliest games were "solo mods of multiplayer TRPGs", typically involving "dice and/or cards, a character sheet, and a hex map from your chosen tabletop RPG to wander through". Similar to non-solo games, they often required stat tracking; however, Wickens observed that the journaling elements and story tracking requirements "were far less introspective than the kind we often see" in the 2020s. Wickens commented that the "genre has evolved profoundly", with many including a narrative focus – "the lines between simple solo RPG systems and journaling games have become far more blurred over the years". Additionally, she noted that "many solo journaling systems today are not only subversions of the standard pen-and-paper model" but also introduce "their own unique and even far-flung mechanics to help cement the theme". In 2026, the ENNIE Awards for role-playing game products introduced the "Best Solo Game" category.
