= Road Wars (novel) =

Book by Laurence James

- Author: Laurence James
- Language: English
- Series: Deathlands series
- Genre: Science fiction Post-apocalyptic novel
- Publisher: Harlequin Enterprises Ltd (U.S.)
- Publication date: October 1994
- Publication place: United States
- Media type: Print (paperback)
- Pages: 348 pp
- ISBN: 0-373-62523-5 (first edition)
- Preceded by: Rider, Reaper
- Followed by: Trader Redux

Road Wars is the twenty-third book in the series of Deathlands. It was written by Laurence James under the house name James Axler.

== Plot synopsis ==
The novel is primarily composed of three separate plots, interleaved throughout the course of events.

In the main plot, Ryan Cawdor and J.B. Dix set off for Seattle in an armawag, leaving their friends behind at Jak Lauren's farm. Ryan and J.B. intend to meet up with Abe, a friend and formerly employed by their once-leader, Trader. The two had long believed Trader was dead after disappearing into the Colorado mountains, but Abe has since sent word that the Trader is alive. More importantly, Abe's note says that he and the Trader will be waiting to meet Ryan and J.B. near the ruins of Seattle, but only for the next six weeks.

Scant hours into their trip, Ryan and J.B. are stopped by a group of "fladgies": religious extremists who practise self-flagellation. The group's leader doesn't just ask for food and supplies, he demands them, earning a denial at gunpoint from the two friends. Ryan and J.B. travel onward, not bothering to kill the group.

Some days later J. B. and Ryan link up with a traveling animal show, run by a woman named Ellie Kissoon and her three daughters. The group heads to Weatherill Springs, and that evening put on a show outside the local bar for the ville's occupants. During the show an audience member extinguishes his cigar on one of the group's lions in a show of bravado, causing the animal to attack and starting a panicked firefight. In the aftermath several audience members are dead and Ryan is asked by Ellie to put down the mortally wounded lion, which he does. The group leaves town quickly, chased by gunfire from angry residents, and escape unharmed. Afterward Ryan notes that the bar's lockbox was missing following the incident, and after some hinting one of Ellie's daughters outright admits that they stole it during the confusion. This earns bemused approval from both Ryan and J. B., but the two nonetheless decide to part ways with the group, not the least reason being that Ellie and her daughters have expressed romantic interest in the two over objections that they are both in committed relationships.
