= Dark Carnival (novel) =

1992 novel by Laurence James

- Author: Laurence James
- Language: English
- Series: Deathlands series
- Genre: Science fiction Post-apocalyptic novel
- Publisher: Harlequin Enterprises Ltd (USA)
- Publication date: January 1992
- Publication place: United States
- Media type: Print (Paperback)
- Pages: 349
- ISBN: 0-373-62514-6 (first edition)
- OCLC: 25225241
- Preceded by: Seedling
- Followed by: Chill Factor

Dark Carnival is the fourteenth book in the series of Deathlands. It was written by Laurence James under the house name James Axler.

== Synopsis ==
Following immediately from the events at the end of Seedling, Ryan Cawdor completes his rescue of his ten-year-old son Dean, with the assistance of his friends Krysty Wroth, Dr. Theophilus Tanner, J. B. Dix, and Mildred Wyeth. They make their escape in the recce wag "borrowed" from Newyork "King of the Underworld" Harry Stanton, narrowly escaping the well organized group of scalie slavers seeking to recapture Dean. Eventually they make their way to the hidden redoubt in the heart of the ville, and make a MAT-TRANS jump after fending off an attack by members of the late Dred's Hawks gang.

The jump is especially rough, leaving only Ryan conscious and functional once the companions make their arrival. He soon discovers that the redoubt beyond the door is occupied by members of a highly organized sec force, who immediately order the group's unconditional surrender via intercom. Ryan closes the door barely in time to prevent their death by gunfire, sending them on another jump. Afterward, Ryan reflects that the strange lightness he felt could have been due to lower-than-Earth gravity, fitting with at least one other possibly extra-Terran jump the companions have made recently; he keeps this reflection to himself.

The next jump takes the group to a small but well-stocked redoubt, allowing them to replenish on ammo and supplies as well as replace clothing and weapons. Ryan also discovers a pre-nuke scrap of paper with handwritten numbers and abbreviations that he pockets, intending to examine it later. Two days later they exit the redoubt, finding themselves in a swampy jungle that Mildred guesses may be Florida. They make their way to the well-kept remains of a large theme park and are met (and disarmed at gunpoint) by the local ville's sec-boss, Kelly, who confirms their location. He takes the companions to see the ville's baron, Boss Larry, who J. B. and Ryan recognize as a very obese Larry Zapp; years prior, while riding with the Trader, J. B. and Ryan severely beat and crippled Larry following his attempt to bribe a member of the Trader's group into betraying him. During this explanation Zapp says that he knows the Trader to still be alive, which Ryan and J. B. refuse to believe. Though Larry was crippled for life, he ultimately agrees with Ryan that his beating was not unprovoked, and assures Ryan he will not have anyone in the group killed or otherwise harmed.

The companions' apparent safety is short lived; a man named Adam Traven interrupts the meeting, and is immediately recognized by most of the group as a dangerous sociopath. Kelly later explains that Traven controls Zapp by supplying him with dreem, a highly addictive narcotic, as well as the services of Traven's harem of dreem-addicted followers. During the meeting Adam takes an obvious and sinister interest in Dean. The next day Ryan is called to meet with Boss Larry again, whereupon Traven demands Cawdor give him his son in exchange for the remaining companions' guaranteed safe exodus from the ville. Ryan stalls, telling Adam he will give him his answer the following day. Around the same time Ryan is able to decipher the pre-nuke note from the redoubt, and concludes it contains address codes for specific redoubts, in particular including the New Mexico redoubt near where Jak Lauren settled with his wife. Thus the companions decide to take Dean to stay with Jak for a few days, ensuring his safety while they take care of Traven who, as Ryan says, "needs chilling". He departs that night with his son for the redoubt.

Ryan's theory proves correct, and the jump takes him and Dean to the still intact MAT-TRANS below the obliterated New Mexico redoubt. After a tense, long chase with some mutated coyotes, the two Cawdors reach Jak's farm. Jak readily agrees to watch over Dean, claiming he has a "blood debt" to Ryan. During the visit Ryan discovers Jak has a working two-way shortwave radio, and agrees to try to keep in touch using his own handheld unit (given to him by a heavily drugged Larry Zapp).

Once Ryan returns to the ville things begin to go downhill quickly. Kelly makes a move against Adam and his followers, but his plan fails and he is brutally executed by being thrown off the top of a freefall-themed ride to his death. Traven is furious at Dean's supposed abduction by swamp dwellers, clearly not believing the story but not acting against Ryan. Instead he takes Doc Tanner hostage under the guise of "questioning", specifically over the disappearance of one of Traven's followers. Unbeknownst to Traven, the missing woman, Sky, was killed by Tanner after he discovered (mid-coitus) that the "dark snaking" she had mentioned participating in was actually the brutal murder of a wrinklie. Ryan learns this before he meets with Adam; he negotiates safe passage for everyone in exchange for his participation in another "dark snaking" that evening.

Ryan is brought along armed only with his knife and panga. During the evening's kill, the slaughter of a family of four, Ryan is able to destroy the house's electrical box, plunging the house into near-pitch darkness. In the confusion he kills seven of Traven's eight followers; Adam and the other survivor retreat to the ville's center. Now accompanied by the rest of his friends, Ryan follows Traven, carrying out an assault that ends with all of Traven's supporters either fleeing or dead and Traven using Doc as a human shield. Distracted by facing off with the companions, Adam fails to see Larry Zapp rise to his feet (with considerable difficulty) behind him, and is forced to release Doc Tanner when Zapp simply falls forward onto Traven, trapping him under his enormous weight. Zapp soon after dies, shot multiple times at point blank range by the panicking Traven. Ryan and J. B. roll Larry's corpse off of Adam, then ensure his slow demise by shooting him in the knees, elbows, and stomach and then leaving him to his fate.

The group makes the jump to the New Mexico redoubt, spurned on by mostly unintelligible but urgent messages from Jak received on the portable two-way. When they arrive Jak is waiting to meet them, and tells Ryan that while he was gone Dean was captured by a band of slavers, who departed through the MAT-TRANS. He also is able to tell Ryan who is leading the slavers, someone Ryan has crossed paths with two times prior: Zimyanin.
