= Seedling (novel) =

1991 novel by Laurence James

- Author: Laurence James
- Language: English
- Series: Deathlands series
- Genre: Science fiction Post-apocalyptic novel
- Publisher: Harlequin Enterprises Ltd (USA)
- Publication date: September 1991
- Publication place: United States
- Media type: Print (paperback)
- Pages: 349 pp
- ISBN: 0-373-62513-8 (first edition)
- OCLC: 24306097
- Preceded by: Latitude Zero
- Followed by: Dark Carnival

Seedling is the thirteenth book in the series of Deathlands. It was written by Laurence James under the house name James Axler.

== Plot synopsis ==
A particularly rough MAT-TRANS jump takes Ryan Cawdor and his friends to a clean, almost immaculate arrival chamber. A cautious exploration of the nearby control room shows it to be similarly clean, free of dust or any form of decay. It is only when Doc Tanner discovers a cup of recently brewed, sweetened coffee that the companions realize the room may have been recently used. Instead of the usual blast doors, the room's exit appears to be some form of airlock; nearby readouts indicate the outside air pressure is very low. Ryan cautiously opens the exterior door in the hopes that the equipment is simply malfunctioning, only to pass out from a sudden drop in oxygen levels. J. B. Dix pulls him to safety before he succumbs, and shuts the airlock door. The demonstrated lack of atmosphere, combined with a lifeless desert view through the airlock portal and mention of "NASA-SEC" on warnings above it, lead all the companions to the same unstated conclusion: they are on another world. Seeing something through the portal that alarms him, Ryan orders his friends into the MAT-TRANS chamber to make another jump. When pressed for what prompted the reaction Ryan can only say he saw something gigantic and alive underneath the desert sand.

The next jump takes them to a partially damaged arrival chamber. Upon examination the redoubt seems ireminiscent of a hidden redoubt the companions previously visited. Numerous earthshifts have blocked of much of this deep-buried redoubt, including the upper reaches of the staircase leading out of it. With no other choice the companions make use of an ancient elevator to reach the exit. Some ten feet from the top it stops functioning as the cables lifting it begin to fray. The companions narrowly escape through the elevator's maintenance hatch, and hang from the snapped cable strands as the elevator drops hundreds of feet to the bottom of the shaft. J. B. blows the door atop the shaft with plas-ex, allowing everyone to swing to safety.

The elevator shaft opens to a destroyed Victorian house in a similarly destroyed city. Ryan guesses it might be the ruins of New York, which is confirmed when the group encounters an armed teen named Dred. Dred explains (at gunpoint) that he is the king of the "turf" the companions are in, which they acknowledge. A truce is established, and Dred takes the group with him to one of his hideouts in the basement of a ruined house. They are later joined by Retha, Dred's "slut". Soon after a small group of mutants - scalies - attack, but are fended off and killed.

== Characters Introduced/Leaving ==
Dean Cawdor (introduced)
