= Chill Factor (novel) =

1992 novel by Laurence James

- Author: Laurence James
- Language: English
- Series: Deathlands series
- Genre: Science fiction Post-apocalyptic novel
- Publisher: Harlequin Enterprises Ltd (USA)
- Publication date: May 1992
- Publication place: United States
- Media type: Print (Paperback)
- Pages: 349
- ISBN: 0-373-62515-4 (first edition)
- OCLC: 26259601
- Preceded by: Dark Carnival
- Followed by: Moon Fate

Chill Factor is the fifteenth book in the series of Deathlands. It was written by Laurence James under the house name James Axler.

== Plot synopsis ==
Arriving in New Mexico via a MAT-TRANS jump, Ryan Cawdor, Krysty Wroth, J. B. Dix, Dr. Theophilus Tanner, and Mildred Wyeth are met by Jak Lauren, who informs them that Ryan's son Dean was ambushed and kidnapped by slavers while he was left in Jak's care. Jak's wife, Christina, was able to capture a mortally wounded slaver and under torture extract information about the group he belongs to. All are surprised to learn that the group is not regional, but instead makes use of the MAT-TRANS chambers and their "last destination" setting to capture slaves from throughout the Deathlands. What is most troubling for Ryan, however, is the name of the group's leader: Major-Commandant Gregori Zimyanin, a man Ryan has encountered two times previously.

After taking a day to rest at the Lauren ranch and construct a plan, Ryan and Jak set out alone to rescue Dean, not taking the entire group so as to better function covertly. Though they anticipate a cold destination based on various clues and statements from the captured slaver, both are only minimally prepared when the MAT-TRANS jump takes them to a brutally cold redoubt. As they make their way through the facility they come across three "cuddlies", small, furred, foot-long animals reputed to be both highly friendly and cute. This turns out to be only half true, which Jak and Ryan both discover when the seemingly benign cuddlies turn vicious once they get close to the pair. After a struggle, both are able to kill the surprisingly lethal animals. Ryan narrowly avoids injury, but Jak is wounded in a few places, the worst being a long cut on his jaw which refuses to stop bleeding. Though not lethal if treated, the wound is severe enough that it will likely become infected and gangrenous in the bitter cold. Both Jak and Ryan agree there is no other choice, and Jak returns to New Mexico through the MAT-TRANS.

Ryan reaches the exit of the redoubt and immediately spots the slavers' base: a large sulfur mine, well-guarded and operated by slave labor, surrounded on all sides by barren, mountainous terrain. He decides to wait until nightfall to make his approach, and ventures further into the redoubt to find a place to rest. While exploring an abandoned testing office Ryan inadvertently activates a set of five prototype "sec hunters": androids programmed to identify a target by their DNA and then hunt them ceaselessly. Ryan only becomes aware of this several hours later, when the first 'droid appears and tries to kill him. The sec hunter proves all but impervious to gunfire, but with some difficulty Ryan manages to destroy the 'droid by pushing it off the edge of a cliff. His victory is short-lived, as a few hours later the second sec hunter attacks, nearly killing him while he sleeps. After defeating the second hunter, Ryan heads to the test chamber to meet the third as it activates; eventually it does, but malfunctions spectacularly, attacking and destroying itself. The fourth and fifth sec hunters do not activate, and Ryan cautiously departs with the hope that the onslaught is over.

Ryan makes his way down the treacherous mountain path and is eventually forced to seek shelter from a harsh blizzard. He finds the entrance to an abandoned mine tunnel, occupied by Kate Webb and her elderly grandfather Cody, two slaves who have escaped from the mine but have discovered they have nowhere to flee to. Cody is abruptly killed soon after when the fourth sec hunter emerges from the blizzard, following Ryan and killing Cody because he was in the way. Kate and Ryan flee deeper into the mine, eventually losing the 'droid by jumping over a large chasm blocking the tunnel. Venturing deeper they discover a fast-moving underground river, which unexpectedly swells and draws them into it. They are briefly stopped by a net strung across the river by "trackies" - hostile mutants - and after nearly being killed by a large group of them Kate and Ryan take their chances in the river again. When they finally find themselves outside again and on land Ryan narrowly manages to get both of them to the shelter of a small cave and start a fire before they succumb to the cold. Grateful for him saving her life, Kate seduces Ryan into having sex with her.

Back in New Mexico Jak has returned safely home. During breakfast one morning he mentions that Christina has been ill recently; at Doc Tanner's questioning he confirms that his wife has been sick only in the mornings, but fails to understand the significance. Sometime later the companions notice a large dust cloud moving in their direction. Christina, equipped with binoculars, can make out a slow-moving group of horses and people at its center, but cannot tell if they are simply another peaceful oxen train or something else. Preparations begin for either eventuality.

The next morning Ryan and Kate sneak into the sulphur mine, slipping unnoticed into a work crew and passing themselves off as other slaves. From there Ryan and Kate attempt to locate Dean, carefully moving from crew to crew over the next several days. Meanwhile, Dean is doing his best to avoid the attention of Zimyanin, who has met the boy a few times over the past days and finds him unsettlingly familiar, but cannot place why. The Major-Commandant only realizes the connection several days later, conveniently when Dean is recovering from a near-fatal mine collapse in the infirmary and Ryan himself has been detained in chains for disobeying sec men while attempting to rescue his son. Zimyanin arrives at Ryan's jail just minutes too late; Kate has managed to kill the jail's guards and free Ryan, and both are gone by the time Zimyanin arrives. The Major-Commandant posts extra guards on Dean, but Ryan stages a mass escape, forcing most of Zimyanin's sec men to round up escaped slaves. Ryan and Kate rescue Dean in the confusion and flee to a disused mining equipment warehouse. Fearing the possibility of a revolt, Gregori orders all remaining slaves executed.

Zimyanin has his sec men surround the warehouse, then proceeds in alone. The game of cat-and-mouse between him and Ryan is interrupted when the fourth sec hunter makes itself known by decapitating Kate. Dean and Ryan flee from the 'droid along elevated metal catwalks with Zimyanin in pursuit; the three of them wind up trapped between a fallen section of catwalk and the advancing sec hunter. Ryan negotiates a brief truce with the Major-Commandant, carefully leaving out that the sec hunter is primarily interested him alone. Zimyanin attempts to confront the 'droid head-on, which ends with the robot breaking his right arm. The brief confrontation causes the catwalk to shift and drop slightly, which the robot has difficulty coping with; noticing this, the three deliberately rock the catwalk violently, eventually causing one end of a section to break free and drop. Zimyanin blocks a last-ditch effort by the sec hunter to attack Ryan and forcibly throws it from the catwalk to its destruction, but ends up hanging one-handed from a severed support cable. Despite the risks (and against the oft-repeated advice of the Trader) Ryan moves to help Gregori back onto the catwalk. However, Dean refuses to let him live, taking aim with his pistol at the Major-Commandant. Rather than force the young boy to kill him, Zimyanin deliberately lets go, falling to his death. Ryan and his son make their way down from the catwalk and escape to the redoubt under the cover of a snowstorm.

The MAT-TRANS takes Ryan and Dean back to New Mexico without incident. As they exit the ruins of the redoubt Ryan spots a large column of smoke in the distance, coming from the direction of the Lauren ranch.

== Cultural references ==
As Ryan and Jak are riding away from the Lauren farm, Doc Tanner runs after them for a moment while calling out, "Shane," mirroring the end of the film of the same name.

While attempting to shake the sec hunter from the warehouse walkway, Zimyanin refers to Ryan and Dean as his "droogs", a fictional slang word for "friends" featured in A Clockwork Orange.
