= Feelie (disambiguation) =

A feelie is a type of physical extra supplement to video games.

Feelie or feelies may also refer to:

== Devices and objects ==
- Feelies, a type of tactile ceramic sculpture developed by U.S. ceramicist Rose Cabat (1914–2015)
- Feelie, a type of force-feedback input device developed by U.S. engineer A. Michael Noll (born 1939)

== Places ==
- Feelie Close, Reedley Hallows, Forest of Pendle, Lancashire, England, UK; a close, a grassland
- Hill of Feelie, Papa Stour, Shetland Islands, Scotland, UK; a hill

== Other uses ==
- The Feelies, a U.S. rock band
- Feelie (Brave New World), a fictional form of entertainment from the Aldous Huxley novel Brave New World
- Feelie (Deathlands), a type of supernatural ability found in the Deathlands literary adventure franchise from Gold Eagle

== See also ==
- Feeley Peak, Wisconsin Range, Horlick Mountains, Marie Bird Land, Antarctica; a mountain in the Trans-Antarctic Mountains
- Feeley Township, Itasca County, Minnesota, USA
- Feeley (surname)
- Feely (surname)
- Feel (disambiguation)
