= Feeley =

Feeley (Irish: Ó Fithcheallaigh) is a surname. Notable people with the surname include:

- A. J. Feeley (born 1977), American football player
- Andy Feeley (born 1961), English footballer
- Camilla Feeley (born 1999), American gymnast
- Don Feeley (1937–2020), American basketball coach
- Frank Feeley (1912–1985), British automotive designer
- Gregory Feeley (born 1955), American teacher, critic, essayist and author of speculative fiction
- John Feeley (born 1955), Irish classical guitarist
- John D. Feeley (born 1961), American diplomat
- Martin Feeley (born 1950), Irish rower
- Myron Henry Feeley (1885–1976), Canadian politician
- Kathleen Feeley (born 1929), American educator
- Paul Feeley (1910–1966), American artist
- Tim McFeeley (born 1946), American gay rights activist

== See also ==
- Feeley Peak, Antarctica
- Feeley Township, Itasca County, Minnesota - a township in the U.S. State of Minnesota
- Feely, surname
- Feelie (disambiguation)
