= Latitude Zero =

Latitude Zero may refer to:

- equator
- Latitude Zero (film), a 1969 tokusatsu film
- Latitude Zero (novel), the twelfth book in the Deathlands series
