= Fury's Pilgrims =

1993 novel by Laurence James

- Author: Laurence James
- Language: English
- Series: Deathlands series
- Genre: Science fiction Post-apocalyptic novel
- Publisher: Harlequin Enterprises Ltd (USA)
- Publication date: January 1993
- Publication place: United States
- Media type: Print (Paperback)
- Pages: 349
- ISBN: 0-373-62517-0 (first edition)
- OCLC: 27154816
- Preceded by: Moon Fate
- Followed by: Shockscape

Fury's Pilgrims is the seventeenth book in the series of Deathlands. It was written by Laurence James under the house name James Axler.

== Plot synopsis ==
Ryan Cawdor awakes following a MAT-TRANS jump and finds himself in an environment with a decreased amount of oxygen, as well as apparently lower gravity. Dr. Theophilus Tanner awakes as well, and with (for him) remarkable clarity reasons that they must have jumped to a MAT-TRANS facility not on the planet. Along with Krysty Wroth, J. B. Dix, Mildred Wyeth, Ryan's son Dean Cawdor, and former Trader associate Abe, the group cautiously explores the facility. Doc's near-certain hypothesis is confirmed when they discover viewing portholes, showing them an unbroken view of stars, clearly placing them in space somewhere. Though possessing a good knowledge of astronomy, J. B. is unable to recognize any constellations seen through the portholes, making it possible that the facility is not orbiting around the Earth.

The facility is empty, full of corpses who appear to have died of unknown causes, possibly a disease, just weeks prior. Exploration of the facility leads to the space station's bridge; there Ryan finds a folder containing the station's logs for the past several months. However, entering the bridge triggers an automatic self-destruct countdown, and Ryan loses the folder when he drops it while leaving the bridge, seconds before the security doors shut. The companions make it to the MAT-TRANS chamber and jump out just before the malfunctioning, accelerated countdown reaches zero.

The next jump takes the group to a redoubt somewhere under Chicago, revealed by graffiti left on the walls. A map indicates the facility has been mostly cleared by evacuating personnel during the beginning of the Great Dark, but two areas of interest are not marked as cleared: the garage, and the chron-jump section. This last part attracts Doc Tanner's attention: "chron-jump" was the name given to the government department responsible for "trawling" him forward in time from 1896. The companions agree to investigate the section. When they arrive they find it still functional, prepared to execute a trawling of three targets from just scant weeks before the beginning of the Great Dark. The companions decide to make an attempt to bring the targets forward, reasoning that it may save people who would otherwise die in the nuclear holocaust. The first attempt is unsuccessful, producing an unpleasant collection of disconnected body parts and gore. The second target arrives intact and alive, but curiously she is bound in a straitjacket. Careful examination of the information on the computer reveals that she is a clinically insane mass murderer, convicted of torturing, castrating, and murdering dozens of young boys. Disgusted, Ryan kills her with a shot to the head. The third trawling attempt is successful as well, bringing forward a 19-year-old man named Michael, a member of an isolated Christian monastic order who has been trained in the fictional martial art of Tao-Tain-Do. Brother Michael is skeptical of the story the companions tell him, but accepts that his situation is beyond his control. Reluctantly, he follows them.

The redoubt's garage contains a fully operational war wag, and the companions set out in it to explore the ruins of Chicago. The city turns out to be not just destroyed but nearly leveled, possibly from high incendiary warheads, leaving only a flat, charred, black wasteland. The level of destruction is shocking to nearly everyone, including Brother Michael. Unable to deny that the companions' story is true, Michael declares that he can no longer consider himself a member of the order, no longer "Brother" Michael. Since he lacks a last name, Doc Tanner suggests he use "Brother"; Michael accepts, christening himself "Michael Brother".

The group takes shelter in a stripped Victorian mansion; that evening they are attacked by a large group of mutants. Michael, who already has displayed remarkable speed and reflexes, singlehandedly kills a group of at least a dozen mutants while armed only with a pair of knives. This does not escape Ryan's notice, who concludes Michael may be faster than even Jak Lauren. Towards the end of the attack Abe is wounded lightly by a mutant. Enraged, he follows the fleeing mutant into the night, only to fall into a rapid-flowing, rock-strewn river while grappling with the mutie. The companions find no sign of him, and presume him dead. The next day, however, they are startled to find some distance away alongside the road, battered, naked, but alive. Abe explains that he had nearly drowned before someone pulled him free of the river. When he was able to see the person, he recognized him as none other than the Trader. Both Ryan and J.B. are incredulous, believing their former employer is dead, but Abe maintains that it was him. He then says he plans to stay behind in order to track down the Trader and, ideally, join up with him. Abe parts company with the companions on good, if bittersweet, terms.

While the companions stop to attempt repairs on the rapidly worsening war wag, Doc and Michael surreptitiously depart. Doc intends to go back to the chron-jump section and attempt to send himself back in time to be reunited with his family, and has convinced Michael to assist him and be sent back as well. As they travel by foot Doc's mental state becomes increasingly unstable, with him often mistaking Michael for his long-dead wife Emily.

Meanwhile, Krysty is kidnapped by a group of highly organized, female mutants. Calling themselves "Midnight" because of their large, nocturnally adapted eyes, the group believe Krysty is the "fire-haired" leader mentioned in their group mythology who will free them from their subterranean existence. Krysty soon learns other, disturbing things about Midnight, particularly that they are an all female group by virtue of killing any male offspring, and also practice cannibalism, including on their doomed male infants.

In order to find Krysty's whereabouts, Ryan, J. B., Mildred, and Dean capture one member of a Midnight sec patrol. Though initially resistant to interrogation by Ryan, the captured woman reveals the necessary information when Mildred "persuades" her using her extensive medical knowledge and a scalpel. Shaken but resolved, the group heads to the mutants' lair to rescue Krysty. During the initial assault Dean is separated from the group, eventually captured and placed in the same cell as Krysty. With someone there to help her afterward, Krysty calls upon her enhanced strength to break the chains binding both her and Dean. Dean kills the arriving pair of guards, recovering his and Krysty's weapons in the process, and helps the severely weakened woman make her escape. After a brief gunfight most of the Midnight leadership are killed, and the group reunites and flees to the surface.

The companions make their way to the redoubt, and find Michael and Doc in the chron-jump facility, prepared for a jump whose countdown is fast approaching execution. The machinery is obviously malfunctioning, but Doc refuses to leave the jump chamber, protected by Michael and holding the group at gunpoint. Ryan manages to disable Michael by faking a stagger and then kicking him in the groin, and Mildred disarms Doc by shooting a support on the chamber's lid, knocking the weapon from his hand when the lid swings down. They manage to drag Doc from the chamber a few seconds before the jump executes, whereupon the chamber malfunctions spectacularly and bursts into flames. Doc apologizes profusely for his behavior, which the group accepts.

After some time to recover, the companions make their way to the MAT-TRANS chamber; Michael accompanies them. Ryan closes the door and initiates the jump.
