= Shadowfall =

Shadowfall is the title of two separate novels:

- Shadowfall - Book one of the Godslayer Chronicles by James Clemens
- Shadowfall - Book twenty-six of the Deathlands series by Laurence James
