= Rider, Reaper =

1994 novel by Laurence James

- Author: Laurence James
- Language: English
- Series: Deathlands series
- Genre: Science fiction Post-apocalyptic novel
- Publisher: Harlequin Enterprises Ltd (USA)
- Publication date: August 1994
- Publication place: United States
- Media type: Print (Paperback)
- Pages: 349
- ISBN: 0-373-62522-7 (first edition)
- Preceded by: Twilight Children
- Followed by: Road Wars

Rider, Reaper is the twenty-second book in the series of Deathlands. It was written by Laurence James under the house name James Axler.

== Plot synopsis ==
The novel opens with Ryan Cawdor resting in a box canyon in New Mexico, a few feet from Jak Lauren. Ryan notes the heavy sadness affecting Jak, sadness he shares. The reason is revealed when the two arise and have a brief moment at three new graves nearby: the graves of Jak's wife Christina, his infant daughter Jenny, and Ryan's traveling companion Michael Brother. The narrative then moves to a few days prior.

Ryan, his son Dean, Krysty Wroth, J.B. Dix, Dr. Theophilus Tanner, Mildred Wyeth, and Michael Brother arrive from their latest MAT-TRANS jump. When Ryan awakes he discovers Michael crying, bitterly depressed over the absence of Dorothy, a woman the companions tried to bring with them from their last destination, but who panicked and fled as the jump started. This simply adds to Michael's already growing depression over his life in the Deathlands, and the companions decide to let him deal with his emotions as he sees fit, but with the understanding to keep an eye on him should he turn dangerous.

Several of the companions recognize the color of the jump chamber walls, and Dean identifies it as the New Mexico redoubt, placing them near Jak Lauren's ranch. The companions set out for the ranch, and in a matter of hours are reunited with Jak Lauren and his family. Christina is still less than pleased to see Ryan, owing to her husband's near death during Ryan's last visit, but agrees to let the group stay for a few days. The next four days pass peacefully and pleasantly.

On the fourth day most of the companions set out, accompanying Jak on a day-trip to hunt deer. Michael opts to stay behind and help Christina care for Jenny and do other chores, part of his efforts over the past days to break out of his depression. The group sets off, and eventually find and kill two deer. As they are dressing them Krysty has a prophetic vision (an ability she has as a mutant) strongly foretelling death, although it is vague and without detail. Assuming the worst, the companions set off quickly for the Lauren ranch. As they approach they see a large group of horses riding away from the ranch. When they finally arrive Jak finds his wife in the kitchen, dead, murdered after being raped and tortured. J.B. finds Jenny in one of the barns, also dead, having been thrown violently against a wall. Michael is nowhere to be found. The companions help Jak clean up the bodies of his wife and daughter, in order to prepare them for burial. Sometime after they finish, Michael is found praying in front of the corpses. After some effort the group manages to get him to respond to them, and with further prompting he tells them what happened.

While the rest of the group was away hunting, Michael spotted a large dust trail in the distance, indicating people moving towards the Lauren farm. Christina didn't seem in any way alarmed by the news, so Michael continued performing various chores around the ranch. Eventually two armored wags arrived at the Lauren ranch, but it was only when numerous, heavily armed, uniformed men and women exited the vehicles that Michael knew something was wrong. Unarmed and heavily outnumbered, Michael was unable to act against the uniformed group, and instead hid in a nearby pile of hay. Several men took Christina into the house, presumably to rape her. After Christina severely wounded one of her rapists with a concealed knife other members of the group killed Jenny in retaliation. The armed group then executed Christina and left quickly, fleeing a group of Native Americans approaching on horseback. Michael fled into the hills, overcome with guilt.

The companions' reactions to Michael's story is mixed; Jak is furious with Michael for not trying to save his wife and child, though Ryan and J.B. maintain that any attempt on Michael's part would have simply resulted in his death without saving Jak's family. Ryan also notes that the horsemen they saw on approach were not the attackers and were presumably hunting the uniformed group as well, something they would not have known without Michael's account. Based on Michael's description, Jak tentatively identifies the attackers' leader as the General, a vicious raider rumored to prey on Native American communities and isolated settlements in the area. The companions make plans to bury Christina and Jenny the following day, then head out in pursuit of the General.

Meanwhile, near Seattle, Abe is still with the Trader, waiting in the hopes that J.B. and Ryan will meet up with them, as Abe has sent a message to do so with several traveling merchants. Abe has spent the past five weeks with the Trader, and has noticed that his former employer seems changed. While the Trader is just as powerful and commanding as he was in the past, Abe is worried about a new streak of brutality he has noticed in the man's behavior. Abe keeps these observations to himself.

The next day, the companions awake and find that Michael is not in his room. They initially assume he has simply left the ranch, but he is discovered in the barn, dead, having hanged himself. Inside his room Dean finds a suicide note, which Doc reads aloud to the rest of the group. In it, Michael explains that he is not killing himself simply out of guilt, but also due to his worsening depression over the past few weeks, which he attributes to the bleak life found in the Deathlands. He then says goodbye to each of the companions individually, and asks Jak for forgiveness; Jak bitterly confesses to the rest that he had already forgiven Michael. With Jak's approval the group bury Michael alongside Christina and Jenny in a remote box canyon. Afterward they stock up on supplies at the ranch and head out on horseback in pursuit of the General.

The companions camp for the evening in the abandoned ville of Opium Wells. During the night Dean is ambushed while urinating and briefly threatened for information on the rest of the group, which is cut short when Ryan and his friends surround the ambushers. Once Dean states that they are hunting the General the ambushers reveal they are Navaho, also hunting the General for a recent attack on one of their settlements. A tense truce is established, and the Navaho release Dean. After further discussion the Navaho agree to travel alongside Ryan and his friends, to better their chances of catching and killing the General.

The truce between the two groups is soon tested when, the following evening, they come across one of the General's wags which has become stuck in the mud. At Jak's suggestion they start a small fire near the wag in order to make its occupants believe the Navaho intend to burn them alive inside the vehicle. The stranded raiders flee the vehicle and are killed. However, when one of the Navaho looks inside the vehicle they are grabbed by a lone remaining raider, who pulls the pin on an implosion grenade he is holding. Ryan is standing atop the vehicle as this happens, and closes the entrance hatch to contain the blast as he flees. The ensuing detonation batters Ryan but does not kill him, thanks to the hatch being closed, but the surviving Navaho claim Ryan's actions doomed their tribesman. A direct conflict between the two groups is narrowly avoided by mention of the General, but the Navaho vow to bring up the matter again once he has been dealt with.

The two groups follow the path of the remaining wag back to the General's hideout, a natural attraction called the J.C. Wright Caverns. The groups leave their horses outside with Dean to guard over them, then head around the rise the caverns are situated in the hopes of finding a way in that doesn't require a frontal assault; the abandoned visitor center proves to have a still-accessible stairway leading down into the caverns. Once inside Ryan and his friends prepare to make a covert assault on the General and his gang, but their plans go awry when two of the Navaho loudly charge a group of raiders (in order to battle "honorably") and are killed without inflicting a single casualty. Ryan and his friends are able to kill the small group of raiders, but not without alerting the General and the rest of his contingent that they are under attack. The rest of the Navaho move to make an attempt on Ryan's life, but he, J.B., and Jak have anticipated this and kill the Native Americans before they can fire a shot.

The situation turns into a standoff, and the General eventually asks for a brief truce to discuss terms, which Ryan and J.B. agree to, temporarily. The General proposes he and his remaining gang be allowed to leave in the wag. Ryan has no intention of letting him leave alive, not the least reason being that he recognizes that the General is not just a brutal killer, but absolutely insane. Meanwhile, Jak has moved silently through the dark caverns and placed himself behind the General and his gang, and starts to kill raiders one by one. This starts a brief firefight which kills the rest of the raiders but allows the General to escape into the caverns.

Rather than chase the General through the dark caves, the companions leave the caverns and wait for him to attempt to flee. Sometime later the General exits through the visitor center, only to be stopped at gunpoint by Ryan and his friends. Jak then moves in on the seemingly unarmed General, quickly disarms him when he tries to pull a derringer, and then kills him with a knife through the eye. The companions then take the remaining wag and head back for the Lauren ranch.

On the trip back the group spends the night in the small ville of Patriarch. The next morning at breakfast Ryan meets the town's only other guest, a traveling merchant. The merchant recognizes Ryan and, after some brief questions, gives him one of Abe's notes. Ryan shares the news of Abe's success in finding the Trader with the rest of the group, and he and J.B. decide to set out alone for Seattle after they return to the ranch.

== Cultural references ==
- Krysty recites several verses from the book of Revelation while experiencing her prophetic vision.
- Michael Brother's suicide note quotes both The Road Not Taken and Ernest Hemingway. After reading the note Doc Tanner paraphrases Rudyard Kipling's quote, "no price is too high to pay for the privilege of owning yourself."
- Doc makes several literary references while approaching Wright Caverns, including the House of Usher and the Minotaur of Greek myth.
- After killing a raider briefly stunned by a thrown can of Coca-Cola, Ryan quotes the company's then-slogan, "nothing like the real thing."
