= Shockscape =

1993 novel by Laurence James

- Author: Laurence James
- Language: English
- Series: Deathlands series
- Genre: Science fiction Post-apocalyptic novel
- Publisher: Harlequin Enterprises Ltd (USA)
- Publication date: June 1993
- Publication place: United States
- Media type: Print (Paperback)
- Pages: 349
- ISBN: 0-373-62518-9 (first edition)
- OCLC: 28272477
- Preceded by: Fury's Pilgrims
- Followed by: Deep Empire

Shockscape is the eighteenth book in the series of Deathlands. It was written by Laurence James under the house name James Axler.

== Plot synopsis ==
Ryan Cawdor, his son Dean, Krysty Wroth, J. B. Dix, Dr. Theophilus Tanner, Mildred Wyeth, and Michael Brother arrive in an icy redoubt via a surprisingly pleasant MAT-TRANS jump. The redoubt is both small and thoroughly stripped, its only occupants a curious breed of concrete-burrowing albino worms in one small section of the facility. A minor situation occurs when a worm latches onto Dean while he is urinating, necessitating its careful removal by his father.

Using a sextant, J. B. places their location somewhere in Colorado. With no supplies in the redoubt the companions venture out into the snowy wilderness, making camp some distance away. That night they are briefly joined by a trio of poachers, who inform them they are on land belonging to Baron Alferd Nelson of the ville of Vista. They also ask the companions' assistance in hunting a large mutant bear in the area; the companions agree, but sneak away once the poachers are asleep, not wanting to potentially run afoul of a Baron. Unfortunately the group is set upon the next day by the bear in question, a monstrous 20-foot (6.1 m)-long Grizzly standing 6 feet (1.8 m) tall at the shoulder. With some difficulty they are able to kill it, the gunfire attracting the poachers. The gunfire also attracts Vista sec boss Rick Coburn and a contingent of his men. Coburn has the poachers executed, then takes Ryan and his friends prisoner and escorts them back to meet with the Baron. During the trip Ryan converses with Coburn, and assesses him as both extremely competent and (reluctantly) likeable.

Baron Nelson proves to be a large, powerfully built man, standing over 7 feet (2.1 m) tall. Initially he orders the group hanged, but quickly changes his mind when Coburn points out that there are women and a child in the group. At the urging of his dowager mother, Nelson confides that he recently lost his wife and son, his wife when he strangled her for adultery with members of a group of roaming "trappers", and his son being brutally tortured and killed by others of the same group. Nelson has since learned that the "trappers" were in the employ of Wizard Sidler, the Baron of nearby Yuma and son of the late former baron of Vista. Later that night Alferd has Ryan brought to him and requests Ryan travel to Yuma and bring back the men responsible for his son's death, along with Sidler. He also states he will be keeping Krysty, Mildred, and Dean in the ville. Should Ryan be successful in his task he says he will let everyone leave freely; should Ryan refuse the request or fail to execute it he will keep the women and child as his new family and have the rest executed. Ryan reluctantly agrees.

Elsewhere, Abe has traveled to see a Native American "seer", hoping she can help him track down the Trader. The woman is able to tell him that the Trader is far to the West, but also warns that three of Abe's friends - whose descriptions match Ryan, Krysty, and J. B. - are in grave danger.

The companions, minus Krysty, Mildred, and Dean, head North for Yuma, encountering a traveling group of actors along the way. When the actors reveal they are heading to Yuma the companions quickly offer to join with them, pretending that they have at least minimal acting experience. The ruse is seen through by the group's female performer, Ellie Morte, but she allows them to join anyway once Ryan assures her their purpose is not nefarious. Attached to the troupe, the companions enter Yuma virtually unchallenged.

Once in the ville J. B. begins to take scrupulous measures to ensure his face is never fully seen by anyone other than the group. Ryan suspects his behavior may have something to do with one of their targets, a man Nelson identified as "Jennison", but when pressed J. B. refuses to discuss the matter; he assures Ryan he will let him know the details once he is certain they are necessary to know, but that the issue is not important right now.

Ryan has little trouble locating his targets; he is almost immediately told to meet with Sidler at the ville's restored movie theater, and seated with the Baron are five of the six targets (the sixth is revealed to have died some months earlier). Following that meeting the companions begin to plan how they are going to capture Sidler and his group. The plan begins to take shape when Ryan learns that the play the troupe intends to perform includes a brief scene requiring audience participation. Because of the risks involved otherwise, the companions inform the troupe of their plans; the actors hesitantly agree to go along with the plot.

Wizard Sidler does not attend the play initially, claiming sickness, which delays the kidnapping and brings Ryan and his friends close to missing Baron Nelson's deadline. Finally word comes that Sidler will be attending, delivered in person by Sidler's associate Jim Jennison. J. B., still taking measures to obscure his face, is able to confirm his suspicions, and once Jennison leaves he shares them with the group: Jennison is his half-brother. He still emphatically supports the plan to kidnap Sidler and his men, particularly since his half-brother's purported misdeeds do not come as a surprise to him. That night the group pulls off the plan successfully, and narrowly makes it out of Yuma before the ville's sec men realize what has happened.

Back in Vista, Baron Nelson has been spending ample time with Dean, clearly using him as a surrogate for his deceased son but otherwise treating him nicely, even indulgently. It is only when the Baron's mother calls the three to a private audience with her that they realize the truth: the Baron does not intend to honor his agreement even if Ryan succeeds, and plans to kill the rest of the group on their return. Dean kills the woman while she tries to hold the three at gunpoint, and Krysty uses the dead woman's pistol to kill Alferd when he arrives and confronts them. Rick Coburn learns of what transpired, but decides not to do anything until the rest of the group's return.

During the trip back to Vista, Sidler manages to break free of his bindings and kills Ellie before he in turn is killed by Doc. The woman's death comes as a particular loss to Tanner, who had recently started a sexual relationship with her. Sometime later the wagon carrying the remaining captives is driven off the edge of the road amid a harsh snowstorm, sending it to the bottom of a craggy ravine. The captives arm themselves and escape, but are quickly killed by J. B. and Ryan. The last captive standing is Jennison, who demands J. B. let him go free; J. B. refuses, and shoots his half-brother dead. The companions then use the ruins of the wagon as a makeshift pyre for the members of the acting troupe, all killed during the escape.

By the time Ryan and his friends return to Vista, Rick Coburn has appointed himself Baron of the ville. Though he cannot simply let the companions go, owing to their direct involvement in the death of the previous Baron, Coburn gives them a two-hour head start after leaving the ville before he and his sec men come after them. The companions are able to make it to the redoubt with Coburn still trailing behind, but nearing. Ryan enters the standard door activation code, but the heavy metal blast door fails to open. After another failed attempt he curses as he realizes the door is not functional, and he and his friends now have nowhere to flee to as Rick Coburn and his armed posse nears.
