= Twilight Children =

1994 novel by Laurence James

- Author: Laurence James
- Language: English
- Series: Deathlands series
- Genre: Science fiction Post-apocalyptic novel
- Publisher: Harlequin Enterprises Ltd (USA)
- Publication date: June 1994
- Publication place: United States
- Media type: Print (Paperback)
- Pages: 347
- ISBN: 0-373-62521-9 (first edition)
- OCLC: 30425388
- Preceded by: Cold Asylum
- Followed by: Rider, Reaper

Twilight Children is the twenty-first book in the series of Deathlands. It was written by Laurence James under the house name James Axler.

== Plot synopsis ==
Ryan Cawdor, his son Dean, Krysty Wroth, J.B. Dix, Dr. Theophilus Tanner, Mildred Wyeth, and Michael Brother arrive in a MAT-TRANS chamber which appears unusually constructed. The normally seamless bulletproof glass windows are badly aligned, along with the doors, and the exterior control chamber appears to be a hastily constructed chamber carved from an existing cave, with chisel marks still showing in the surrounding granite. The atmosphere outside is heavy and foggy, and in addition to preventing J.B. from putting his sextant to use the fog also seems to interfere with both compasses and electronic equipment, including watches. The companions venture out cautiously into the barren surroundings, encountering a variety of highly mutated insect-like creatures, as well as a few sources of water, including a fast-flowing stream. All are tainted with an unknown substance that causes an unpleasant stinging on contact, and thus clearly undrinkable. Eventually the companions arrive at surprisingly intact town, which is revealed to be an "Old West" themed reconstruction called Lonesome Gulch. In short order the companions are surrounded by a large group of flying reptilian creatures, and after the companions take shelter in the town's General Store the creatures attack. J.B. and Ryan rig a crude timed explosive, then wait with the others in the store's root cellar; when the explosives detonate the companions flee in the ensuing confusion, though Ryan is wounded by one of the creatures. The companions make it to the MAT-TRANS chamber and make the jump.

Ryan and his friends arrive in a familiar redoubt, and after some exploration conclude that it is a redoubt in Louisiana, where they initially met Jak Lauren. However, rather than the wet Louisiana bayou they are expecting, the group finds the area outside the redoubt is a barren, flat, lifeless desert. Furthermore, Ryan and J.B.'s radiation detectors show the area is dangerously radioactive, forcing them back inside before they can investigate a cause for the sudden change in the terrain. With no resources in the redoubt, the group reluctantly makes a third jump.

When the companions arrive in the next chamber they find that Ryan, Doc, and Michael are all unconscious. After some time Doc comes around, but Ryan manages only to regain consciousness briefly before passing out again. Most troubling is Michael, who regains consciousness only to attack Doc ferociously, claiming he is Satan. Michael is subdued and restrained; the group concludes that Michael has been driven to psychosis by the back-to-back jumps, but have no idea if he will recover. When Mildred examines Ryan she notes that his wound is obviously infected, presumably with some kind of poison, and needs to be sterilized. The companions head into the redoubt, finding it thoroughly cleared out but locating a sterile medical facility. With no other options Mildred sterilizes Ryan's wound with a superheated knife, with the rest of the group holding Ryan down due to a lack of any anesthesia. Partway through the process Michael regains consciousness, no longer psychotic, and helps restrain Ryan. The procedure is successful, and Ryan begins to recover.

The next day the companions set out from the redoubt, having found ample water but no food. J.B.'s sextant places them in New England, and Doc recognizes the nearby lake as Lake Champlain. The companions find a man's corpse, as well as one of a stickie (a vicious breed of mutant), and further evidence of stickie activity. Sometime later they encounter three people searching for their friend, who they identify as the corpse. Saddened, but grateful for knowing their friend's fate, the young people invite the companions back to their ville, Quindley.

Quindley is immediately recognized as an unusual ville: the residents are all strict vegetarians, and the ville does not have a Baron, but rather an unseen (behind a one-way mirror), "all-knowing" leader calling himself Moses. Furthermore, the ville's residents react strangely to most of the companions, save for Michael and Dean, and Doc notes that none of Quindley's inhabitants appear older than 25. This is confirmed by the ville's second in command, Jehu, who when pressed further reveals that once someone turns 25 they are ritualistically executed. The companions are not subject to this, and Jehu commands that they be treated as guests. This is met with disapproval, to the point where Jehu kills one of Quindley's residents after he in turn attempts to kill Doc.

Quindley is shown to have other problems as well. Though warned of stickies being present in the area, the ville's guards do not alter their patrols, as Moses has not authorized it. This results in the deaths of four children when stickies attack a group near the edge of town. Ryan and his friends kill the stickies before they can kill any more. Quindley's residents also attempt to convince Dean and Michael to stay permanently; a woman named Dorothy is particularly successful with Michael, fostering a romantic and sexual attachment between the two. The woman's allure is strong enough that, after showing him two prisoners awaiting execution and kept in narrow cages which force them to stand, Dorothy convinces Michael to have sex with her in front of them as a form of torture.

The following night the prisoners are ritually executed by being burned alive. During the execution stickies attack the ville, and using a large fire and a smaller force as a distraction manage to capture more than a dozen of the ville's children, along with Krysty, Mildred, Doc, and Dean. When Ryan offers Moses assistance in recovering the children Moses refuses, saying that no rescue attempt will be made. The remaining companions discuss the matter and decide to steal one of the ville's boats and set out after the stickies the next morning. Michael joins them sometime later and volunteers to come along, which they accept. That morning Ryan and his friends steal a boat without incident and set off for where they believe the stickie camp is located. There they find a group of at least 30 stickies, who have already started killing the captive children. Though it is a difficult task they manage to kill the entire contingent of mutants, freeing their friends and the surviving children.

At Michael's request the group returns to Quindley in the hopes of convincing Dorothy to accompany them. Unknown to them, Moses had previously ordered they be executed that morning during breakfast, and following their disappearance has ordered their death should they return. Ryan and his friends search for Dorothy unsuccessfully but without incident, and eventually arrive at Moses' temple. There they find both Dorothy and Jehu mostly naked, bearing teeth and whip marks as well as other signs of recent sexual abuse. Jehu attempts to kill Doc but is shot before he can, and his body knocks a torch into a nearby tapestry, starting a large fire. Doc then shoots through the one-way mirror hiding Moses, shattering it, revealing him to be a bedridden, grossly obese mutant dwarf. The companions take Dorothy and leave the temple, allowing Moses to burn alive, and are able to exit Quindley without incident. The companions make it to the redoubt safely, and with some coaxing convince Dorothy to enter the MAT-TRANS chamber. Ryan starts the jump, but partway through Dorothy panics and tries to leave the chamber. Ryan is unable to move, and passes out as he watches an already-fading Michael attempt to stop Dorothy.

In the epilogue, a traveling merchant arrives at the ruins of Quindley some weeks later. The ville has burned to the ground, the temple fire having spread to the other buildings, and its residents have fled the area or died. The merchant takes out a note he was given, to be delivered to men named J.B. Dix and Ryan Cawdor, a note given to him by Abe and the Trader telling the men to meet them in Seattle. The merchant drops the note into the water, remarking to himself that if the Trader asks, he can say he at least tried.

== Cultural references ==
- Moses' temple contains paintings by a number of prominent artists, including Andrew Wyeth and Georgia O'Keeffe.
- The traveling merchant in the epilogue sings several songs by "King Elvis", including Return to Sender.
