= Deep Empire =

1994 book by Laurence James

- Author: Laurence James
- Language: English
- Series: Deathlands series
- Genre: Science fiction Post-apocalyptic novel
- Publisher: Harlequin Enterprises Ltd
- Publication date: January 1994
- Publication place: United States
- Media type: Print (Paperback)
- Pages: 349
- ISBN: 0-373-62519-7 (first edition)
- OCLC: 29630254
- Preceded by: Shockscape
- Followed by: Cold Asylum

Deep Empire is the nineteenth book in the series of Deathlands. It was written by Laurence James under the house name James Axler.

== Plot synopsis ==
Picking up directly from the events at the end of Shockscape, Ryan Cawdor, his son Dean, Krysty Wroth, J.B. Dix, Dr. Theophilus Tanner, Mildred Wyeth, and Michael Brother find themselves trapped at the exterior entrance of a redoubt somewhere south of Yuma, Colorado. The group is being pursued by a posse headed by Rick Coburn, sec boss of the nearby ville of Vista, intent on killing them for the death of the ville's Baron. Safety lies within the redoubt, but the exterior keypad which operates the redoubt's main doors is not functioning. Ryan makes the decision to scale the mountain the redoubt is built into, with the intent of reaching a section of corridor which has been opened to the elements following an earthquake.

Ryan scales the steep mountain and makes it inside, taking more than a half-hour to recover from the subzero climb. He then makes his way into the redoubt, carefully moving past a hive of mutated albino worms, previously shown to be carnivorous and capable of burrowing through solid concrete. At this point he is attacked by Coburn, who has followed Ryan's ascent into the redoubt. The two spar hand-to-hand, finding themselves evenly matched. When Coburn pulls a gun (shortly before Ryan was going to pull a knife) the noise rouses the nearby mutant worms, who swarm Coburn and devour him alive. Ryan opens the entrance door and lets his friends into the redoubt; the companions then make a jump into the redoubt's MAT-TRANS chamber.

The jump takes them to a somewhat damaged redoubt, which all describe as being unnaturally humid. The reason for this is soon discovered: the bulk of the facility appears to have become submerged, leaving only the MAT-TRANS facility above water. The companions exit through a partially submerged, open tunnel, finding themselves on a chain of islands; using his sextant, J.B. places them on the Florida Keys. The group is alarmed to discover that Michael, who earlier revealed that he cannot swim, has not surfaced. They briefly search for him, only to find him when a gigantic sea serpent emerges from the bay, clutching Michael. Inexplicably, Michael is rescued when a large group of dolphins appear and swarm the serpent, causing it to drop him and scare him off. Michael is shaken, but okay.

The companions venture south, and eventually come across a seemingly intact facility identified as the Mark Tomwun Institute of Peaceful Oceanographic Research. The group soon learns from the facility's eponymous leader that the dolphins which rescued Michael came from the Institute, and furthermore are startled to learn that one of the Institute's members, Miranda, is able to speak with the dolphins directly. Tomwun offers the companions hospitality and a place to stay, which they accept.

Several days pass, and the Institute seems perfect: peaceful, and safe, with ample food and comfortable lodging. Some of the companions, particularly Ryan and J.B., are nonetheless suspicious, but initially have no evidence on which to base their suspicions. This changes on an evening when Ryan is attacked by a Seminole Indian, who mistakes him for a member of the Institute. Later on an Institute trip to observe ocean phenomena, Ryan is tipped overboard by an undersea volcanic eruption, and washes ashore a large distance from the rest of the group. On his trek back to the Institute he comes across a shipwrecked Seminole vessel, its hull breached by explosives and its merchant crew slaughtered. Ryan confronts Tomwun with these pieces of information, at gunpoint, upon his return.

Tomwun confesses that the boat was indeed sunk by the Institute, or rather their trained dolphins carrying explosives. He assures Ryan that the sinking was a mistake, and the intended target was the man who he asserts slaughtered the crew: Red Jack Yoville, leader of a large band of pirates. Yoville has been capturing and pillaging settlements in the area, and Tomwun feared the Institute would be next. Disgusted with Tomwun's tactics and relative apathy over the deaths of the Seminole merchants, Ryan still agrees to spare his life and the lives of the Institute's other occupants; the companions leave for the redoubt the next morning. On the way they come across an encampment of pirates, and when surprised by a pirate returning from urinating have no choice but to open fire on the encampment. The companions survive without injury, but are unable to prevent some of the pirates from escaping, presumably to warn the rest of their group. The companions reason that the pirates will likely set up ambushes further north, and reluctantly head back to the Institute.

Meanwhile, Abe has been following the Trader towards the west coast, hearing repeated tales of a man matching the Trader's description. After spending several days holed up against a snowstorm Abe comes across a wandering hunter, who tells him he has a letter for Abe from the Trader. The note recounts several events in Abe's immediate past, including a fight with a mutated bobcat, and ends telling Abe that the Trader is trying to leave his old life behind, but will still be happy to see Abe if he catches up with him.

Back in Florida, Ryan and Tomwun come to an agreement: Ryan and his friends will stay for five days, during which time they will defend the Institute should the pirates attack. Scouting missions during the first four days reveal nothing, save for a peculiar race of mutants living in a near-immaculate Best Western hotel on a southern island. When Ryan and Krysty return from scouting the island, they learn that a group of eight pirates—a scouting party—attacked the Institute and were repelled. The next day Yoville himself arrives in a wag under a white flag of truce. Yoville tells Ryan that the two have met previously when Ryan was traveling with the Trader, and offers Ryan a deal: Ryan and his friends will leave unharmed while the pirates raid the Institute (and kill its inhabitants). Remembering his previous encounter with Yoville, specifically an ambush attempt by the pirate leader, Ryan refuses the offer, and shoots the two accompanying pirate commanders dead. Yoville retreats.

The next day at dawn the pirates attack en masse, coming over land with war wags and armed men as well as by boat from the north and south. The group is prepared for the wags, and detonates a large gasoline incendiary device as they cross the bridge, disabling the wags and killing a large number of pirates. The companions struggle for a way to deal with the approaching boats, but have the problem taken care of when a sudden earthquake causes waves large enough to tip them over. Unfortunately the earthquake does not stop, evidently it is not a simple quake but something cataclysmic. Tomwun attempts to stop the group from leaving, only to be shot by Ryan. As the companions leave they watch a mortally wounded Tomwun fall into a newly opened fissure, and further fissures destroy the remains of the Institute.

The companions quickly overtake the fleeing Yoville, and with his approach masked by the continuing earthquake Ryan gets close to the man and kills him. Ryan and his friends then use Yoville's single remaining vehicle to head for the redoubt. Though hampered by shifting, treacherous terrain, they make it to the facility. Before entering the still-submerged entrance the group noted the source of the earthquake: a visible and gigantic volcanic eruption roughly 50 miles from shore. Doc notes that the force has generated a massive tsunami headed their way; the group quickly swims into the redoubt, which is barely functioning. As Ryan closes the doors to the MAT-TRANS chamber the lights begin to dim, and he soon realizes something is wrong with the jump he has just initiated.

== Cultural references ==
Characters in the novel reference several water-themed films, including Jaws (film) and Creature from the Black Lagoon, the latter being used to describe the mutants found inhabiting the isolated Best Western.
