= Dark Carnival =

Dark Carnival may refer to:

- Dark Carnival (short story collection), a 1947 collection by Ray Bradbury
- Dark Carnival (novel), the fourteenth book in the Deathlands series
- Dark Carnival (Insane Clown Posse), the mythology of a concept album series by Insane Clown Posse
- Dark Carnival (wrestling), a stable of professional wrestlers in WCW
- "Dark Carnival", a song by Vanessa Carlton from the video game Spy Hunter 2
- "Dark Carnival", episode 4, map 9 in the FPS video game Blood
- "Dark Carnival", a campaign in the video game Left 4 Dead 2
- "Dark Carnival", a Detroit band whose members included Niagara, Ron Asheton, and Scott Asheton
