= Cold Asylum =

1994 novel by Laurence James

- Author: Laurence James
- Language: English
- Series: Deathlands series
- Genre: Science fiction Post-apocalyptic novel
- Publisher: Harlequin Enterprises Ltd (USA)
- Publication date: April 1994
- Publication place: United States
- Media type: Print (Paperback)
- Pages: 348
- ISBN: 0-373-62520-0 (first edition)
- OCLC: 30089716
- Preceded by: Deep Empire
- Followed by: Twilight Children

Cold Asylum is the twentieth book in the series of Deathlands. It was written by Laurence James under the house name James Axler.

== Plot synopsis ==
Ryan Cawdor, his son Dean, Krysty Wroth, J.B. Dix, Dr. Theophilus Tanner, Mildred Wyeth, and Michael Brother begin a MAT-TRANS jump in a decaying redoubt, only for the jump to go awry part-way through. When they awake, they each find themselves alone in a distinctly separate redoubt, with the exception of Dean and Krysty who were in close contact when the jump occurred. Individually they explore the outer control rooms of their respective redoubts, only to all decide (for varying reasons) to jump again; all decide to jump within the 30 minute "return window", which under normal circumstances will return them to the last facility they jumped from. Instead, they are all sent to a different facility, presumably because their initial jump point has ceased to function.

Though the companions are all sent to the same facility, their arrival is staggered in 20 minute increments. Ryan arrives first and proceeds through the facility, followed (unknowingly) by J.B. who in turn is followed (also unknowingly) by Mildred. Ryan discovers the top floor of the redoubt houses a massive wartime mortuary which has recently been invaded by hostile "cannies". Though of little relative threat, Ryan is nonetheless forced to open fire on an attacking group of cannies. J.B. immediately recognizes the sound of Ryan's blaster and rushes to his aid, with Mildred meeting up with the two soon after the firefight concludes.

Meanwhile, Krysty and Dean have arrived at the redoubt and waited long enough to greet Michael as he jumps in. They proceed to the top floor and reunite with the rest of the group, unaware that Doc Tanner has arrived some time after them. Doc's mental stability has been temporarily impaired owing to the stress of his initial destination combined with back-to-back jumps, and in this state he mistakenly comes face-to-face with a large group of cannies. The ensuing battle draws his nearby friends to him, who help kill the remaining cannies and save Doc from certain death.

Reunited, the companions explore the redoubt, finding several warehouse-sized rooms filled with innumerable refrigerated corpses, slowly being raided and used for food by the cannies. Doc refuses to let the corpses be used for food, locates the environmental control room, and increases the ambient temperature as far as the system will allow. The long-frozen bodies quickly begin to rot, and Ryan and his friends leave the facility as fast as possible.

The area outside proves to be a hilly pine forest, which causes both Mildred and Doc to doubt J.B. when his sextant places them somewhere in Kansas; he asserts that he is correct. The argument is moot and the companions enjoy several hours of relative peace and favorable conditions. Sometime later, a horse-mounted hunting party is spotted in the distance, causing the companions to hide. Initially suspecting it to be a deer hunt, the companions soon learn it is a manhunt. The fleeing man is caught a short distance from Ryan and his friends, then brutally executed at the order of a beautiful, raven-haired woman. Before the hunters can leave Dean falls from his hiding place, forcing Ryan and his friends to reveal themselves. The woman is introduced as Mistress Marie Mandeville, the daughter of the local Baron; she orders Ryan and his friends to accompany her back to the ville. Along the way Doc nearly drowns while crossing a raging river and is rescued by Ryan, but loses his LeMat Revolver in the process.

Meanwhile, in the ville of Andromeda, somewhere near the Cific Ocean, Abe is continuing his search for Trader. While at a bar he is set upon by three men, scavengers who mistakenly believe he has a map to a cache of pre-dark technology, and intend to interrogate him for the information. Though outnumbered and caught unprepared, he is saved when the three men are shot dead. His savior is none other than the Trader. Reunited, the two begin to travel together, and eventually start offering payment for any traveler willing to carry a message for either J.B. or Ryan, should they come across either. The message simply states that Abe has found the Trader, and the two will be near Seattle for the next three months.

Back in Kansas, the Baron, Nathan Mandeville, greets the companions warmly and shows them great hospitality, offering them fine food and comfortable lodgings. Nonetheless there is a subtle undertone of something sinister in the Baron's attitude, further emphasized by veiled, ambiguous warnings from the ville's sec boss, Harry Guiteau, as well as the extreme security measures in place throughout the ville. The following day the companions are invited to participate in a series of public, competitive challenges, which they accept. The first challenge pits Michael against the ville's jailer, Jericho, in unarmed wrestling. Michael wins the first bout, only to be sucker-punched by Jericho as her readies for the next round. Angered, Michael crushes Jericho's larynx, then finishes him with a bone-breaking kick to the face. The death attracts the immediate attention of Mistress Marie, who appears to orgasm watching Michael kill the larger man. The remainder of the competition is spent with Michael seated by her side, the two touching intimately and at one point with Marie possibly giving Michael a handjob. At the end of the day's events Mistress Marie leaves for her quarters with Michael at her side.

While the other companions eat dinner and, later, return to their rooms, Michael and Marie spend time alone in her room. Both are drunk, and in this state Marie mentions that she will keep Michael "safe"; Michael briefly realizes this implies his friends will not be safe. The two then proceed to have sex for several hours, with Mistress Marie variously biting him, performing fellatio, engaging in vaginal intercourse, having Michael perform cunnilingus on her, and ordering him to kiss her boots and suck her boot heels in order to "show you'll do what I tell you." While this happens Marie plays a collection of custom vids, which start with relatively benign subjects such as bondage, group sex, and pegging, but move on to darker subjects such as bestiality, eventually culminating in a vid showing Mistress Marie disemboweling a pre-teen boy, to her both recorded and live sexual pleasure. Michael reacts by simultaneously punching Marie and vomiting in her face, and flees for his friends' rooms.

After Michael tells his friends what he witnessed, the group makes an attempt to leave the ville, only to be stopped by a large contingent of sec men led by Marie. The companions are disarmed and escorted back to their rooms. The following day Ryan concludes they are going to be hunted for sport, which Marie confirms. The companions are given only their bladed weapons and a 15 minute start. Rather than hopelessly trying to reach the redoubt, Ryan and his friends circle around and re-enter the ville from the back just as the hunting party, consisting of most of the ville's sec men, leave from the front. The companions disable the ville's hydroelectric generator, then make their way into the Baron's armory to recover their weapons. In the process Doc discovers and takes a replica LeMat, chambered for more common, modern ammo. With the sec men fast approaching J.B. rigs the armory with a timed explosive and the group flees downstairs; the ensuing explosion kills most of the sec men and starts a massive fire. Baron Nathan is killed by Doc, while Marie seeks cover and Guiteau takes Dean hostage, using him as a human shield. Mildred takes careful aim, shooting off Guiteau's trigger finger and then killing him with a shot between the eyes once Dean is clear. Michael declares he will deal with Marie himself, calmly approaches her while she tries (and fails) to shoot him, and after exchanging some brief, unheard words with the woman, he snaps her neck. The companions then leave for the redoubt.

The thawed bodies in the upper floors of the redoubt have rotted thoroughly, causing most of the cannies to die of starvation. After making their way through the near-unbearable stench the companions arrive at the MAT-TRANS chamber. Everyone links hands, lest they be sent to separate locations, and Ryan closes the door to start the jump.

== Cultural references ==
Baron Mandeville's private art gallery features works from many famous artists. Named artists include Alan Burgess, Georgia O'Keeffe, Pablo Picasso, Andrew Wyeth, and Andy Warhol.
