= Axler =

Axler is a surname. Notable people with the surname include:

- Rachel Axler, American screenwriter and playwright
- Sheldon Axler (born 1949), American mathematician

== See also ==
- James Axler, pen-name of multiple action-adventure writers
