= Deathlands: Homeward Bound =

2003 television film

- Based on: Homeward Bound by James Axler
- Written by: Gabrielle G. Stanton; Harry Werksman
- Directed by: Joshua Butler
- Starring: Vincent Spano; Jenya Lano; Colin Fox; Alan C. Peterson; Traci Lords
- Theme music composer: Christopher Lennertz
- Country of origin: United States
- Original language: English

Production
- Producer: Derek Rappaport
- Cinematography: Bruce Worrall
- Editor: Joshua Butler
- Running time: 95 minutes
- Production companies: Amber Light Films Inc. Kinetic Pictures

Original release
- Network: Sci-Fi Channel
- Release: May 17, 2003

Deathlands: Homeward Bound is a 2003 television film based on the Deathlands series of books. The Sci Fi Pictures film was released on May 17, 2003 on the Sci Fi Channel. It stars Vincent Spano and Traci Lords, and was directed by Joshua Butler.

== Plot ==
From left to right: Jenya Lano, Vincent Spano, Cliff Saunders, Nathan Carter

Earth is devastated by a nuclear war in 2084. The sky is red from chemical waste and what was once the United States has become "Deathlands" inhabited by mutants. Communities ruled by powerful survivors are called "villes" and the one known as Front Royale had been ruled by a good man Baron Titus Cawdor (Colin Fox) who is killed by his wife, Lady Rachel Cawdor (Traci Elizabeth Lords). His son, Harvey Cawdor (Alan C. Peterson), kills one of his Brother Morgan Cawdor and partially blinds his young brother Ryan Cawdor (Vincent Spano) by stabbing him in the eye and cutting his face. Ryan breaks Harvey's nose by headbutting him. Ryan abandons his home knowing he can never return.

After spending 20 years in the wastelands, the one-eyed Ryan returns to Front Royale accompanied by his girlfriend, Krysty Wroth (Jenya Lano), the teenage mutant Jak Laurent (Nathan Carter) and weapons specialist J.B. Dix (Cliff Saunders) to face his stepmother and brother and avenge his father's murder.

== Cast ==
- Vincent Spano as Ryan Cawdor
  - Robert Clark as Young Ryan Cawdor
- Jenya Lano as Krysty Wroth
- Colin Fox as Baron Titus Cawdor
- Alan C. Peterson as Baron Harvey Cawdor
  - Park Bench as Young Harvey Cawdor
- Traci Elizabeth Lords as Lady Rachel Cawdor
  - Heather Bertram as Young Lady Rachel Cawdor
- Cliff Saunders as J.B. Dix
- Nathan Carter as Jak Laurent
- Matthew Currie Holmes as Nathan Cawdor
- Jeffrey R. Smith as Sergeant
- A. Frank Ruffo as Kenny Morse
- Rob Avery as Tom
- Max Danger as Jabez Pendragon Cawdor
- Peter Messaline as Ben
- Mif as Mutie Guard #1

== Critical reception ==
Justin Felix of DVD Talk called the telefilm "a low-budget mish-mash of elements from Dune and The Most Dangerous Game", and that although it was "one bad movie" it was "moderately entertaining" and something that could be appreciated by fans of Mystery Science Theater 3000. He said the film is "so bad that it's actually entertaining if you want to laugh at movie-making ineptitude."

Hal Erickson of Rovi made note of the popularity of the book series upon which the film is based, and that the film seemed aimed at long-distance truck drivers.

== Release ==
The film premiered on the Sci-Fi Channel on May 17, 2003, and was released on video in Argentina in 2005. It has its United States DVD premiere in February 2008. It worldwide release under different titles: Campos de Morte in Brazil, Deathlands in Argentina, Deathlands, le chemin du retour in France, I gi ton nekron in Greece, La tierra de la muerta in Spain, and Halálország: Hazafelé in Hungary.

=== Home media ===
The DVD includes four separate trailers for the movie, all similar in content and under the shorter title Deathlands, as well as a "production stills" gallery accompanied by music from the film's score, and an audio commentary track with director Joshua Butler who provides background on the film's production.

== Differences from the novel ==
While Deathlands: Homeward Bound closely follows the plot of the fifth Deathlands novel, Homeward Bound, it departs in a number of notable ways. Dr. Theophilus Tanner and Lori Quint are absent from the film, and Jak Lauren is specifically identified as a mutant, versus simply being an albino as in the novels. J.B. Dix is also changed, being significantly more talkative than his character in the novels, where he is described as a man who "would never use three words when two would do the job." The purpose of redoubts is not clearly explained, and the film makes no mention of the MAT-TRANS facilities typically found in redoubts and used by Ryan and his friends to travel throughout most of the novels.
