= Feal =

Feal may refer to:

- Fealty, a pledge of allegiance of one person to another
- FEAL, a block cipher
- John Feal (born 1966), American advocate for first responders to the September 11 attacks

== See also ==
- Feel (disambiguation)
