= Feely =

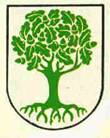
The crest of the Feely Clan residing in north Connacht features an oak tree with acorns on a silver banner.

Feely (Irish: Ó Fithcheallaigh) is an Irish Gaelic clan or family from northern Connacht, Ireland, primarily the counties of Sligo, Roscommon and Leitrim. They are a member of the Síol Muireadaigh, a tribal confederation of clans that descend from a common ancestor. The Síol Muireadaigh are the leading group of the Uí Briúin Ai, who ruled Connacht for over 700 years with only one exception. The Síol Muireadaigh claim descent from Muiredach Muillethan (meaning the broad-crowned sea warrior) King of Connacht (died 702). The Feely family are closely linked with the O'Conor Don family and share the same clan crest, only without the motto.

== Modern usage ==
=== Connaught Rangers and Boyle ===
The Feely clan has a long history of enlistment with the Connaught Rangers ("The Devil's Own') of Boyle, Roscommon. A Feely is noted as being involved in the Connaught Rangers Mutiny in India of 1920, saying to Captain LC. Badham "Private Feely said to me 'You are not going to shoot down any more innocent unarmed Irishmen' or words to that effect.". The mutiny was in response to the many atrocities being committed by the British army in Ireland during the War of Independence. Many Feelys lived in Boyle and continue to live there today. Feelystone, a stone masonry business open since 1780, was founded by Christy Feely.

=== The Irish War of Independence and other conflicts ===
James E. Feely is noted as being involved in one of the first engagements of the Irish war of Independence, an Irish Republican Brotherhood raider during the Rockingham raid. Henry J. Feely is noted as being a Prisoner of War and Commandant of the Irish Republican Army. Many Feelys were active in the IRA and IRB during the War of Independence. Colonel Peter Feely was one of three platoon commanders in the now infamous Siege of Jadotville during the United Nations Operation in the Congo of 1961.

== Other spellings ==
Anglicized versions of the original Ó Fithcheallaigh spelling include but are not limited to Feeley, Feely, O'Feely, O'Feeley, Fehilly, O'Fehilly, and Field.

== Notable people ==
- Tom McFeely (born 1949), "Commanding Officer" of the IRA men imprisoned in H Block at Long Kesh
- Frank Feely (21st century), Northern Irish politician
- Herta Feely, writer and child safety activist
- Jay Feely (born 1976), American football placekicker
- John J. Feely (1875–1905), American politician
- Orla Feely (born c.1964), Professor of Engineering
- Terence Feely (1928–2000), British screenwriter
- Rory Feely (born 1997), Irish footballer

== See also ==
- Feeley
- Feelie (disambiguation)
