= Feels =

Feels or The Feels may refer to:

== Albums ==
- Feels (Animal Collective album), 2005
- Feels (Snoh Aalegra album), 2017

== Songs ==
- "Feels" (song), a 2017 song and single by Calvin Harris off the album Funk Wav Bounces Vol. 1
- "Feels" (Snoh Aalegra song), a 2017 song by Snoh Aalegra, the title track off the eponymous album Feels (Snoh Aalegra album)
- "The Feels" (song), a 2021 song by Twice
- "F.E.E.L.S.", a 2021 music video and song by Tory Lanez

== Other uses ==
- The Feels (film), a 2017 film by Jenée LaMarque

== See also ==
- All the Feels (album), 2019 album by Fitz and the Tantrums
- Feel (disambiguation)
