= Feel =

Feel may refer to:

- Feeling

== Music ==
=== Bands ===
- Feel (New York band), a 1980s dance and R&B band
- Feel (Polish band), a pop rock band

=== Albums ===
- Feel (Feel album), 2007
- Feel (George Duke album) or the title song, 1974
- Feel (Glenn Hughes album), 1995
- Feel (Human Drama album), 1989
- Feel (Namie Amuro album), 2013
- Feel (Roachford album), 1997
- Feel (Sleeping with Sirens album) or the title song, 2013
- Feel, by Nagisa ni te, 2002
- Feel (A-Mei EP), 1999
- Feel (Junho EP), 2014

=== Songs ===
- "Feel" (Kendrick Lamar song), 2017
- "Feel" (Koda Kumi song), 2006
- "Feel" (Robbie Williams song), 2002
- "Feel" (Chicago song), 2006
- "Feel", by Asking Alexandria from Where Do We Go from Here?, 2023
- "Feel", by Big Star from #1 Record, 1972
- "Feel", by Bombay Bicycle Club from So Long, See You Tomorrow, 2014
- "Feel", by Bradley Joseph from Rapture, 1997
- "Feel", by Davido from Timeless, 2023
- "Feel", by Jacob Collier and Lianne La Havas from Djesse Vol. 2, 2019
- "Feel", by Mahmut Orhan, 2016
- "Feel", by Måneskin from Rush!, 2023
- "Feel", by Matchbox Twenty from More Than You Think You Are, 2002
- "Feel", by Phora, 2018
- "Feel", by Post Malone from Stoney, 2016
- "Feel", by Stereophonics from Language. Sex. Violence. Other?, 2005
- "Feel", by Syd Barrett from The Madcap Laughs, 1970
- "Feel", by Teenage Fanclub from Man-Made, 2005
- "Feel", by the Verve from The Verve E.P., 1992
- "Feel", by Victoria Duffield from Shut Up and Dance, 2012

=== Videos ===
- Feel..., a DVD by Koda Kumi, 2004

== Other ==
- Feel (animation studio), a Japanese animation studio
- Feel Air, a Norwegian airline
- Feel, the prototype name for the Mega Drive platform video game Ristar
- Friendly Enough Expression Language, as specified in Decision Model and Notation

== See also ==
- Feels (disambiguation)
- Feelie (disambiguation)
