= Outlanders (novel series) =

Series of science-fiction novels created by Mark Ellis

The core characters of the Outlanders series: Brigid Baptiste, Kane and Grant. Cover by Cliff Nielsen

Outlanders is a long-running series of science-fiction novels created by Mark Ellis and published by Gold Eagle, an imprint of Harlequin Enterprises.

== Plot ==
Set in the same fictional universe as The Trader and Deathlands but separated by a century, Outlanders follows the adventures of a core group of explorers—Kane, Grant, Brigid Baptiste, and Domi—who operate out of a secret military base known as the Cerberus Redoubt.

Although The Trader, Deathlands, and Outlanders all bear the "James Axler" byline, Outlanders is primarily (although not exclusively) written by its creator Mark Ellis whereas multiple authors produce Deathlands.

Two hundred years after a nuclear holocaust devastated the Earth, the chaos and barbarism depicted in The Trader and Deathlands have given way to a centralized, despotic government ruled by nine mysterious barons.

Material taken from redoubts, secret preholocaust military installations with stores of weapons and the home of the gateways, mat-trans (matter-transfer) devices, supplied the baronial rule in what was known as the “Program of Unification.”

Rearmed from redoubt stockpiles, the barons consolidated their power and reclaimed very advanced technology created two centuries before by the so-called “Totality Concept.”

Their power bolstered by the invisible authority known only to an elite few as the Archon Directorate extended beyond the fortified city-states into what came to be called the Outlands. There, the rootstock of humanity survived, eking out an existence in hellzones and hounded by black-armored Magistrates, the enforcers of the barons’ laws.

When Cobaltville Magistrates Kane and Grant came across a piece of misplaced technology and Brigid Baptiste, an archivist began an investigation on their behalf, they found themselves branded as seditionists, their citizenship stripped from them and they were reclassified as Outlanders.

Since 1997’s Exile to Hell, the first book in the series, the heroes and heroines of Outlanders slowly uncovered the truth behind the barons, the Archons and the nuclear holocaust and finally the hidden history of humanity.

They learn that Earth and humankind has been influenced since the dawn of time by the reptilian Anunnaki and the Tuatha Dé Danann. They realize that the baronies are a revival of the god-king system of ancient Sumeria.

Besides the nine barons, other threats arise in the early books, namely Sindri, a brilliant but deranged dwarf who rules a secret colony on Mars. First appearing in Parallax Red (1998), Sindri becomes the most persistent foe of the Cerberus warriors, appearing in several novels.

Other recurring enemies include Colonel Thrush, Sam the Imperator, Grigori Zakat and MacCann, the last prince of the Tuatha Dé Danann.

In Shadow Scourge (2000), the heroes contend with Ocajinik, apparently one of H. P. Lovecraft’s Old Ones.

In Children of the Serpent (2005), the Cerberus warriors discover that the nuclear holocaust and the institution of the baronies were part of an ancient plan formulated over a thousand years before by Enlil, the last Anunnaki on Earth in order to reincarnate the pantheon of Sumerian gods and re-establish their rule over the world.

The reincarnated Enlil becomes the Outlanders' main villain. He is considerably more evil and powerful than any of the barons, and has much of the knowledge and technology of the Anunnaki.

Employing conspiracy theories and myths from all cultures as underpinnings, 'Outlanders' quickly distanced itself from the survivalist tone of 'Deathlands' and struck out in new directions, providing explanations and a backstory for many of the unresolved science-fiction elements in the earlier series.

== Series History ==
According to series creator Mark Ellis, Outlanders was not originally conceived as having any connection whatsoever to Deathlands. The link between the two series came after all the other elements had been envisioned and was suggested by Ellis who had already authored several novels in the Deathlands series.

The “Axlerverse,” a term coined by Mark Ellis, is inclusive of events in both Outlanders and Deathlands—however, there is very little in the way of a cohesive fictional universe in the latter series.

Deathlands did not develop much depth in the way of setting and Ellis introduced many new concepts to make the Axlerverse into a plausible fictional world, particularly important in the books published post-2001.

Outlanders has established a reputation for featuring strong yet sexy female characters both in the books and on the covers, particularly those produced by artist Cliff Nielsen.

Other writers who have contributed to Outlanders are Mel Odom and Victor Milán.

Outlanders is also available as unabridged full-cast audio dramas up to #56: Cradle of Destiny through GraphicAudio.

Series #	Title	Author(s)	First Edition ISBN	Date Released
001	Exile to Hell	Mark Ellis	0-373-63814-0	June 1997
002	Destiny Run	Mark Ellis	0-373-63815-9	September 1997
003	Savage Sun	Mark Ellis	0-373-63816-7	December 1997
004	Omega Path	Mark Ellis	0-373-63817-5	March 1998
005	Parallax Red	Mark Ellis	0-373-63818-3	June 1998
006	Doomstar Relic	Mark Ellis	0-373-63819-1	September 1998
007	Iceblood	Mark Ellis	0-373-63820-5	December 1998
008	Hellbound Fury The Lost Earth Saga Book 1	Mark Ellis	0-373-63821-3	March 1999
009	Night Eternal The Lost Earth Saga Book 2	Mark Ellis, Mel Odom	0-373-63822-1	June 1999
010	Outer Darkness The Lost Earth Saga Book 3	Mark Ellis	0-373-63823-X	September 1999
011	Armageddon Axis	Mark Ellis	0-373-63824-8	December 1999
012	Wreath of Fire	Mel Odom, Mark Ellis	0-373-63825-6	March 2000
013	Shadow Scourge	Mark Ellis	0-373-63826-4	May 2000
014	Hell Rising	Mark Ellis	0-373-63827-2	August 2000
015	Doom Dynasty The Imperator Wars Book 1	Mark Ellis	0-373-63828-0	November 2000
016	Tigers of Heaven The Imperator Wars Book 2	Mark Ellis	0-373-63829-9	February 2001
017	Purgatory Road The Imperator Wars Book 3	Mark Ellis	0-373-63830-2	May 2001
018	Sargasso Plunder	Mel Odom, Mark Ellis	0-373-63831-0	August 2001
019	Tomb of Time	Mark Ellis	0-373-63832-9	November 2001
020	Prodigal Chalice	Mel Odom	0-373-63833-7	February 2002
021	Devil in the Moon The Dragon Kings Book 1	Mark Ellis	0-373-63834-5	May 2002
022	Dragoneye The Dragon Kings Book 2	Mark Ellis	0-373-63835-3	August 2002
023	Far Empire	Mark Ellis	0-373-63836-1	November 2002
024	Equinox Zero	Mark Ellis	0-373-63837-X	February 2003
025	Talon and Fang Heart of the World Book 1	Mark Ellis	0-373-63838-8	May 2003
026	Sea of Plague Heart of the World Book 2	Mark Ellis	0-373-63839-6	August 2003
027	Awakening	Victor Milán	0-373-63840-X	November 2003
028	Mad God's Wrath	Mark Ellis	0-373-63841-8	February 2004
029	Sun Lord	Victor Milán	0-373-63842-6	May 2004
030	Mask of The Sphinx	Mark Ellis, Chris Van Deelen	0-373-63843-4	August 2004
031	Uluru Destiny	Victor Milán	0-373-63844-2	November 2004
032	Evil Abyss	Mark Ellis	0-373-63845-0	February 2005
033	Children of the Serpent	Mark Ellis	0-373-63846-9	May 2005
034	Successors	Victor Milán	0-373-63847-7	August 2005
035	Cerberus Storm	Mark Ellis	0-373-63848-5	November 2005
036	Refuge	Victor Milán	0-373-63849-3	February 2006
037	Rim of the World	Mark Ellis	0-373-63850-7	May 2006
038	Lords of the Deep	Victor Milán	0-373-63851-5	August 2006
039	Hydra's Ring	Mark Ellis	0-373-63852-3	November 2006
040	Closing the Cosmic Eye	Victor Milán	0-373-63853-1	February 2007
041	Skull Throne	Mark Ellis	0-373-63854-X	May 2007
042	Satan's Seed	Mark Ellis	0-373-63855-8	August 2007
043	Dark Goddess	Mark Ellis	0-373-63856-6	November 2007
044	Grailstone Gambit	Mark Ellis	0-373-63857-4	February 2008
045	Ghostwalk	Mark Ellis	0-373-63858-2	May 2008
046	Pantheon of Vengeance	Douglas Wojtowicz	0-373-63859-0	August 2008
047	Death Cry	Rik Hoskin	0-373-63860-4	November 2008
048	Serpent's Tooth	Douglas Wojtowicz	0-373-63861-2	February 2009
049	Shadow Box	Rik Hoskin	0-373-63862-0	May 2009
050	Janus Trap	Rik Hoskin	0-373-63863-9	August 2009
051	Warlord of the Pit	Mark Ellis	0-373-63864-7	November 2009
052	Reality Echo	Douglas Wojtowicz	0-373-63865-5	February 2010
053	Infinity Breach	Rik Hoskin	0-373-63866-3	May 2010
054	Oblivion Stone	Rik Hoskin	0-373-63867-1	August 2010
055	Distortion Offensive	Rik Hoskin	0-373-63868-X	November 2010
056	Cradle of Destiny	Douglas Wojtowicz	0-373-63869-8	February 2011
057	Scarlet Dream	Rik Hoskin	0-373-63870-1	May 2011
058	Truth Engine	Rik Hoskin	0-373-63871-X	August 2011
059	Infestation Cubed	Douglas Wojtowicz	0-373-63872-8	November 2011
060	Planet Hate	Rik Hoskin	0-373-63873-6	February 2012
061	Dragon City	Rik Hoskin	0-373-63874-4	May 2012
062	God War	Rik Hoskin	0-373-63875-2	August 2012
063	Genesis Sinister	Rik Hoskin	0-373-63876-0	October 2012
064	Savage Dawn	Douglas Wojtowicz	0-373-63877-9	February 2013
065	Sorrow Space	Rik Hoskin	0-373-63878-7	May 2013
066	Immortal Twilight	Rik Hoskin	0-373-63879-5	August 2013
067	Cosmic Rift	Rik Hoskin	0-373-63880-9	November 2013
068	Wings of Death	Douglas Wojtowicz	0-373-63881-7	February 2014
069	Necropolis	Douglas Wojtowicz	0-373-63882-5	May 2014
070	Shadow Born	Douglas Wojtowicz	0-373-63883-3	August 2014
071	Judgment Plague	Rik Hoskin	0-373-63884-1	November 2014
072	Terminal White	Rik Hoskin	0-373-63885-X	February 2015
073	Hell's Maw	Rik Hoskin	0-373-63886-8	May 2015
074	Angel of Doom	Douglas Wojtowicz	0-373-63887-6	August 2015
075	Apocalypse Unseen	Rik Hoskin	0-373-63888-4	November 2015
