= Deathlands =

Novel series

Pilgrimage to Hell, the first novel in the series

Deathlands is a series of novels written by Christopher Lowder under the pseudonym Jack Adrian and published by Gold Eagle Publishing. The first novel, Pilgrimage to Hell, was published in 1986. This series of novels was written by Lowder until he became ill following his development of the plot and writing most of the book. Laurence James, under the pseudonym James Axler, then completed the series.

The series exists in both an episodic style and a series format. Some novels can be read as standalone works, while others are dependent on the previous release. There are also a few trilogies within the series.

== Plot ==
On January 20, 2001, the climax of the Cold War turns the world into a postapocalyptic wasteland. The endgame began with a preemptive strike on Washington, DC. Underground nuclear bombs were detonated from within the basement of the Soviet embassy, by an elite group of Spetsnaz operatives, destroying the central command structure and political system of the United States. For an indefinite period of time, a nuclear exchange between the United States and the Soviet Union devastated both countries and, subsequently, the entire planet (but little details are known of what occurred outside the two countries). All manner of genetic contagions were released, infecting the survivors of the firestorm with horrible illnesses. The remaining survivors lived harshly during a time of prolonged nuclear winter known as Skydark. The geography, climate, and ecosystems of the world changed dramatically. What was left of the United States came to be known as the Deathlands.

Nearly a century later, civilization began to reappear, albeit brutal, short lived, morally confused, and crazed from mutation. Between the many hot spots are small plague pits ruled by warlords who have no limits to establish their rule and expand their influence. These individuals are known as the Barons. Their rabble pits are known as villes and baronies. Civilization unknowingly resembles the Dark Ages. Trading resumes between the villes: jack (a regional currency), jolt or "joltsky" (a hallucinogenic mixture of mescaline and heroin), ammunition, and slaves are the primary forms of currency. Life is a strange mixture of ancient history and limited technology scavenged from the twentieth century. Military technology is the most prized possession, and success is often measured by the number of bullets one possesses. Ryan Cawdor leads a group across the Deathlands. Ryan has extremely secret knowledge of the 20th century — the understanding of hidden underground complexes, known as redoubts, that contains teleportation technology. He and his companions guard this knowledge with their lives. The technology is called MAT-TRANS.

Each novel typically begins with the companions arriving at a previously unknown redoubt via MAT-TRANS. If the situation is impossible or hostile, the companions can use the transporter's "last destination" feature to return to the sending point. If the redoubt is unknown, the companions usually explore in search of weapons and supplies, which they rarely come across. They occasionally get lucky and find a working shower or stored food, which they always use or take. The plot picks up speed once the characters leave the redoubt and explore the surrounding countryside. Frequently, the companions are apprehended or forced into a confrontation with the local barons. Each novel reveals a little about the characters' backgrounds and motivations, and the region in which they arrived.

== Main characters ==
- Ryan Cawdor: In the novel, Cawdor is the youngest son of a powerful baron in Virginia. He first appeared in the novel Pilgrimage to Hell by Jack Adrian. His middle brother, Harvey, is responsible for the loss of Ryan's left eye after murdering Morgan, Ryan's eldest brother. Ryan's nephew, Nathan Freeman now controls the barony of Front Royal. Ryan was named after his great-grandfather, the original founder of Front Royal. He joined the Trader's convoy approximately ten years before the beginning of Pilgrimage to Hell, at the age of 21. Over the years, he climbed the ranks rapidly in Trader's convoy, soon becoming Trader's second-in-command. It was during this time that he met his best friend J.B. Dix, who joined Trader a little over a year later. Ryan is a master of many forms of combat, including knife fighting, and unarmed combat. He learned a great deal from both Trader and J.B. Ryan was portrayed by Vincent Spano in the Sci Fi Channel original movie version of Deathlands: Homeward Bound.
- Krysty Wroth: In the novel, Wroth is a skilled and talented combatant and markswoman. She is a valued member of the companions' party for both her natural fighting abilities and her limited "feelie" (precognitive) abilities. She was initially introduced in the first book in the series, Pilgrimage to Hell in 1986, and it was in that book that she established a mutually monogamous romantic relationship with Ryan Cawdor. She is a mutant, though possessing a rare combination of beneficial mutant traits, unlike the myriad of mutilated and deformed "muties" the party comes across throughout their travels. Her most notable characteristic is her long red, semi-sentient animated hair as a result of her mutation.
- John Barrymore Dix: In the novel, J.B. Dix, also known as The Armorer, has been Ryan Cawdor's closest friend and travelling companion since both men worked for and travelled with the Trader. He is a thin, wiry, tough man who wears wire-rimmed spectacles and a brown fedora. He is very quiet, never using four words when three will do. He is a living encyclopedia on weapons from pistols to tanks to missiles. He is also an explosives expert and decent hand-to-hand combatant, although only an average shot. He carries a large canvas satchel containing his explosives and other weapons at all times. Born in Cripple Creek, Colorado, he spent his early years exploring the local area and salvaging trade goods (primarily firearms) from abandoned dwellings and shelters. He developed severe claustrophobia in one such incident as he was trapped in a cave-in with a corpse for several days while exploring an old mine. After serving several years with the Trader he entered the MAT-TRANS with Ryan and his other companions. He began a romantic relationship with Dr. Mildred Wyeth. He has also learned that he has glaucoma and will eventually go blind.
- Dean Cawdor: In the novel, Dean is the teenage son of Ryan Cawdor. Despite his youth he is a full member of the team of warrior survivors that comprise the primary characters. Dean is the result of an affair Ryan Cawdor had with Sharona Carson when Ryan was still traveling with his old mentor, the Trader. Dean's existence is first revealed in Time Nomads, and he first encounters the group in Seedling.
- Jak Lauren: In the novel, Lauren is an albino distinguished in the books by his unusual syntax when speaking. Jak was introduced in the third book, Neutron Solstice. He is a young man, in his late teens, and is an extremely capable hunter and warrior. His signature weapons are his leaf bladed throwing knives, of which he has between 8 and 12 hidden on him at all times, and often uses them as thrown weapons or for melee when guns are inappropriate, and his .357 Colt Python revolver. He comes from the suburb of West Lowellton in Lafayette, Louisiana, where the group first meet him. At the time, he is leading a group of rebels against an extremely sadistic baron known as Tourment. When Ryan and the other's first met him, and saw just how skillful of a fighter and leader he is, they are surprised to find he is only 14 years old. He is later married to Christina Ballinger, and temporarily leaves the group to settle down in Latitude Zero, but tragedy strikes and his wife and daughter are savagely murdered, and he rejoins the group. In the Deathlands: Homeward Bound movie from the Sci-Fi Channel, his personality was altered to that of a "savage".
- Dr. Mildred Winona Wyeth: In the novel, Wyeth is a stocky black woman, known for her corn-rowed hair and smart-ass comments to life in general. She is also a medical doctor from the twentieth century who was cryogenically frozen before the nuclear holocaust. After her introduction in the series she joined Ryan Cawdor and the other characters in roaming the Deathlands via the Redoubts. She has been romantically linked to J.B. Dix, one of the original characters of the series. Mildred is both a skilled physician and a person to contend with firearms-wise, having been an Olympic pistol champion before her cryonic freezing, she has the ability to shoot with a level that almost defies belief, notably hitting Stingwings, small fast terrors that are generally feared in Deathlands, as they attack the group while in flight.
- Dr. Theophilus Algernon Tanner: In the novel, Tanner, also known as "Doc", was rescued by Ryan Cawdor and his people from the ville of Mocsin, where he was being kept captive by Jordan Teague, the ville's baron. Dr. Tanner speaks in a very strange, Victorian way. Physically, he is very tall and skinny. His face is deeply lined and framed by long gray hair. He has perfect teeth and speaks with a deep, rich voice which commands attention. He is a doctor of philosophy, as well as having studied ichthyology. Tanner was actually born on February 14, 1868, in South Strafford, Vermont. During a time traveling experiment by scientists, he was brought one hundred years into the future, to 1998. Since he proved to be a nuisance and kept trying to escape, the scientists pushed him a further one hundred years into the future, to the Deathlands. The time travel has put a strain on his body, and his memory has partly lapsed. His knowledge of pre-apocalypse redoubts (hidden government fortresses) proves invaluable to Ryan Cawdor and his team. He possesses knowledge of several other projects besides the one which "Time Trawled" him to the Deathlands time period, notably TITAN. There is a past drug-induced psychotic break whenever something brings that particular project to the forefront, and Doc fails to think clearly until the moment passes or he is distracted to another subject. Dr. Tanner was left out of the 2003 film Deathlands: Homeward Bound.
- Trader: In the novel, there are many people in Deathlands who bear the title "trader", but only one who used it as his name. Trader is a legend all over Deathlands—a man known for fair deals, a distinct lack of mercy, and the largest and most powerful convoys anywhere. Trader was about 56 years of age at the time of his final appearance (and, it is presumed, death); he had grizzled salt-and-pepper hair and a beard, a burly build, and a chronic cough from his radiation sickness (though he was later cured of this). He carried a battered Armalite rifle, often using it as a crutch.

== Enemies ==
Over the course of the series, Ryan Cawdor and his band have fought and defeated countless power-mad villains, and most died within one book. Many villains were Barons—rulers of small dictatorships scattered across The Deathlands (notably, Barons are also the primary antagonists of the sequel series Outlanders, except there are now only a small number of technologically adept superhuman barons instead of the hundreds of lesser kingpins). Another notable group are the mutants—humanoid beings that have adapted and gained inhuman powers, psionic and otherwise, due to radiation exposure and natural selection. There are a few notable villains in this list, which include:

- Cort Strasser: Former Security Man for Baron Teague and sado-masochistic mastermind behind many plots against Cawdor's crew. He appeared three times: as the Sec Chief in Pilgrimage to Hell, as the leader of a group of formidable soldiers in Pony Soldiers, and finally as the leader of a group of raiders who travel by railway in Latitude Zero, in which he killed himself in an attempt to kill Ryan Cawdor.
- Major Zimyanyin: Major-Commissar Gregori Zimyanin was a member of the Russian Security Bureau (sort of an amalgam of the KGB and the army). He appeared multiple times throughout the series, opposing Cawdor's team. He kills himself after a plot to kidnap Ryan Cawdor's son because he was too honorable to allow a small child to bear such a heavy grudge.
- Straub: A powerful psionic mutie who had the abilities of mind-reading and hypnosis. He was encountered two times throughout the series: as a leader of a group of bandits in Shadowfall (where he also presumably killed major characters Abe and Trader), and as cohort to evil Baroness Katya Beausoleil in Circle Thrice, where he was shot by Doc Tanner.
- Magus: A former slaver of genetically engineered mutants, he had his eyes, hands, and jaw destroyed in a fight against the Trader, and later was repaired and learned to master pre-dark technology. He's believed to have magical abilities by the more superstitious in the Deathlands.
- Baron Harvey Cawdor: The brother of Ryan Cawdor and the leader of a barony in Virginia. He tried and succeeded, with the help of his father's young wife, to kill his father and brothers so he could rule the barony—although Ryan escaped with one less eye. Because of a breech-birth, he was a misshapen hunchbacked man with a proficiency in guns and knives. He was killed in his first appearance in Homeward Bound.
- Dredda Trask: A woman who lived in an alternate universe where the nuclear detonations never occurred. She was the CEO of a corporation that controlled most of the world, and was genetically altered to be the "perfect" human being. She was later destroyed by parasites that inhabited the void between the universes.
- Baron Willie Elijah: A powerful Baron who believed in genetic purity and sentenced all other kinds of humans to forced labor. While never being more of a secondary antagonist himself, he has caused a number of villains incidentally, such as...
  - Johnson Lester: His former Sec Man who was later badly burned and later became the leader of an army of mutant stickies.
  - Kaa: A powerful psionic mutant under the captivity of Baron Elijah, but eventually making it into his good graces. He had the ability to control mutants with his pineal third eye. He then tried to commit genocide of all non-mutants in the Deathlands.

== Series history ==
The series had begun as a joint project by Christopher Lowder (pen name "Jack Adrian") and Laurence James (pen name "James Axler"), with the first book called Pilgrimage To Hell. Laurence James then solely wrote the Deathlands series up to and including Eclipse at Noon. However, due to failing health he was forced to leave the series in 1995. Prior to his death in February 2000, James wrote one last novel, Crucible of Time, which was released in 1998. All other Deathlands novels have been written by a number of other authors, including Mark Ellis, who produced the first post-Laurence James entry, Stoneface. Gold Eagle is owned by Harlequin. In 2014, Harlequin was purchased by HarperCollins. It was decided that Gold Eagle would be shut down. After December 2015, Deathlands novels stopped being produced following the company's closure, with the rights transferred to Graphic Audio and all subsequent sequels being exclusively audio dramas. Graphic Audio have produced over one thousand hours of audio set in the Axlerverse.

The Sci Fi Channel adapted Homeward Bound into a television movie in 2003.

In January 2024, a ten-part television series adaptation to be directed by Jonathan Frakes was announced.

As of July 2025, the Axlerverse consists of 238 stories (The Trader 1-4, Deathlands 0-158, and Outlanders 1-75), not including the 2003 television film.

The Trader prequel series (audiobook exclusives)

| Series # | Title | Date Released |
|---|---|---|
| 001 | The High Cost of Doing Business | October 2022 |
| 002 | Golconda | March 2023 |
| 003 | Hostile Takeover | January 2024 |
| 004 | Devil in the Details | July 2025 |

Gold Eagle novels

| Series # | Title | Author(s) | First Edition ISBN | Date Released |
|---|---|---|---|---|
| 000 | Encounter | Alan Philipson (Primary Story), Mark Ellis, Christopher Lowder, Laurence James | 0-373-81197-7 | January 1988 |
| 001 | Pilgrimage to Hell | Christopher Lowder (First ¾ of book), Laurence James (Last ¼ of book) | 0-373-62501-4 | June 1986 |
| 002 | Red Holocaust | Laurence James | 0-373-62502-2 | September 1986 |
| 003 | Neutron Solstice | Laurence James | 0-373-62503-0 | March 1987 |
| 004 | Crater Lake | Laurence James | 0-373-62504-9 | August 1987 |
| 005 | Homeward Bound | Laurence James | 0-373-62505-7 | January 1988 |
| 006 | Pony Soldiers | Laurence James | 0-373-62506-5 | May 1988 |
| 007 | Dectra Chain | Laurence James | 0-373-62507-3 | September 1988 |
| 008 | Ice and Fire | Laurence James | 0-373-62508-1 | December 1988 |
| 009 | Red Equinox | Laurence James | 0-373-62509-X | June 1989 |
| 010 | Northstar Rising | Laurence James | 0-373-62510-3 | December 1989 |
| 011 | Time Nomads | Laurence James | 0-373-62511-1 | June 1990 |
| 012 | Latitude Zero | Laurence James | 0-373-62512-X | April 1991 |
| 013 | Seedling | Laurence James | 0-373-62513-8 | September 1991 |
| 014 | Dark Carnival | Laurence James | 0-373-62514-6 | January 1992 |
| 015 | Chill Factor | Laurence James | 0-373-62515-4 | May 1992 |
| 016 | Moon Fate | Laurence James | 0-373-62516-2 | September 1992 |
| 017 | Fury's Pilgrims | Laurence James | 0-373-62517-0 | January 1993 |
| 018 | Shockscape | Laurence James | 0-373-62518-9 | June 1993 |
| 019 | Deep Empire | Laurence James | 0-373-62519-7 | January 1994 |
| 020 | Cold Asylum | Laurence James | 0-373-62520-0 | April 1994 |
| 021 | Twilight Children | Laurence James | 0-373-62521-9 | June 1994 |
| 022 | Rider, Reaper | Laurence James | 0-373-62522-7 | August 1994 |
| 023 | Road Wars | Laurence James | 0-373-62523-5 | October 1994 |
| 024 | Trader Redux | Laurence James | 0-373-62524-3 | December 1994 |
| 025 | Genesis Echo | Laurence James | 0-373-62525-1 | March 1995 |
| 026 | Shadowfall | Laurence James | 0-373-62526-X | May 1995 |
| 027 | Ground Zero | Laurence James | 0-373-62527-8 | July 1995 |
| 028 | Emerald Fire | Laurence James | 0-373-62528-6 | October 1995 |
| 029 | Bloodlines | Laurence James | 0-373-62529-4 | December 1995 |
| 030 | Crossways | Laurence James | 0-373-62530-8 | February 1996 |
| 031 | Keepers of the Sun | Laurence James | 0-373-62531-6 | April 1996 |
| 032 | Circle Thrice | Laurence James | 0-373-62532-4 | June 1996 |
| 033 | Eclipse at Noon | Laurence James | 0-373-62533-2 | September 1996 |
| 034 | Stoneface | Mark Ellis | 0-373-62534-0 | November 1996 |
| 035 | Bitter Fruit | Mel Odom | 0-373-62535-9 | January 1997 |
| 036 | Skydark | Alan Philipson | 0-373-62536-7 | March 1997 |
| 037 | Demons of Eden | Mark Ellis | 0-373-62537-5 | May 1997 |
| 038 | The Mars Arena | Mel Odom | 0-373-62538-3 | August 1997 |
| 039 | Watersleep | Terry Collins | 0-373-62539-1 | November 1997 |
| 040 | Nightmare Passage | Mark Ellis | 0-373-62540-5 | January 1998 |
| 041 | Freedom Lost | Terry Collins | 0-373-62541-3 | March 1998 |
| 042 | Way of the Wolf | Mel Odom | 0-373-62542-1 | July 1998 |
| 043 | Dark Emblem | Terry Collins | 0-373-62543-X | October 1998 |
| 044 | Crucible of Time | Laurence James | 0-373-62544-8 | January 1999 |
| 045 | Starfall | Mel Odom | 0-373-62545-6 | April 1999 |
| 046 | Gemini Rising The Baronies Trilogy - Book 1 | Nick Pollotta | 0-373-62546-4 | July 1999 |
| 047 | Gaia's Demise The Baronies Trilogy - Book 2 | Nick Pollotta | 0-373-62547-2 | October 1999 |
| 048 | Dark Reckoning The Baronies Trilogy - Book 3 | Nick Pollotta | 0-373-62548-0 | January 2000 |
| 049 | Shadow World | Alan Philipson | 0-373-62559-6 | March 2000 |
| 050 | Pandora's Redoubt | Nick Pollotta | 0-373-62560-X | June 2000 |
| 051 | Rat King | Andy Boot | 0-373-62561-8 | September 2000 |
| 052 | Zero City | Nick Pollotta | 0-373-62562-6 | December 2000 |
| 053 | Savage Armada The Skydark Chronicles - Book 1 | Nick Pollotta | 0-373-62563-4 | March 2001 |
| 054 | Judas Strike The Skydark Chronicles - Book 2 | Nick Pollotta | 0-373-62564-2 | June 2001 |
| 055 | Shadow Fortress The Skydark Chronicles - Book 3 | Nick Pollotta | 0-373-62565-0 | September 2001 |
| 056 | Sunchild | Andy Boot | 0-373-62566-9 | December 2001 |
| 057 | Breakthrough | Alan Philipson | 0-373-62567-7 | March 2002 |
| 058 | Salvation Road | Andy Boot | 0-373-62568-5 | June 2002 |
| 059 | Amazon Gate The Illuminated Ones - Book 1 | Andy Boot | 0-373-62569-3 | September 2002 |
| 060 | Destiny's Truth The Illuminated Ones - Book 2 | Andy Boot | 0-373-62570-7 | December 2002 |
| 061 | Skydark Spawn | Edo Van Belkom | 0-373-62571-5 | March 2003 |
| 062 | Damnation Road Show | Alan Philipson | 0-373-62572-3 | June 2003 |
| 063 | Devil Riders Scorpion God - Book 1 | Nick Pollotta | 0-373-62573-1 | September 2003 |
| 064 | Bloodfire Scorpion God - Book 2 | Nick Pollotta | 0-373-62574-X | December 2003 |
| 065 | Hellbenders | Andy Boot | 0-373-62575-8 | March 2004 |
| 066 | Separation | Andy Boot | 0-373-62576-6 | June 2004 |
| 067 | Death Hunt | Andy Boot | 0-373-62577-4 | September 2004 |
| 068 | Shaking Earth | Victor Milán | 0-373-62578-2 | December 2004 |
| 069 | Black Harvest | Edo Van Belkom | 0-373-62579-0 | March 2005 |
| 070 | Vengeance Trail | Victor Milán | 0-373-62580-4 | June 2005 |
| 071 | Ritual Chill Altered States - Book 1 | Andy Boot | 0-373-62581-2 | September 2005 |
| 072 | Atlantis Reprise Altered States - Book 2 | Andy Boot | 0-373-62582-0 | December 2005 |
| 073 | Labyrinth | Alan Philipson | 0-373-62583-9 | March 2006 |
| 074 | Strontium Swamp | Andy Boot | 0-373-62584-7 | June 2006 |
| 075 | Shatter Zone The Coldfire Project - Book 1 | Nick Pollotta | 0-373-62585-5 | September 2006 |
| 076 | Perdition Valley The Coldfire Project - Book 2 | Nick Pollotta | 0-373-62586-3 | December 2006 |
| 077 | Cannibal Moon | Alan Philipson | 0-373-62587-1 | March 2007 |
| 078 | Sky Raider | Nick Pollotta | 0-373-62588-X | June 2007 |
| 079 | Remember Tomorrow | Andy Boot | 0-373-62589-8 | September 2007 |
| 080 | Sunspot | Alan Philipson | 0-373-62590-1 | December 2007 |
| 081 | Desert Kings | Nick Pollotta | 0-373-62591-X | March 2008 |
| 082 | Apocalypse Unborn | Alan Philipson | 0-373-62592-8 | June 2008 |
| 083 | Thunder Road | Andy Boot | 0-373-62593-6 | September 2008 |
| 084 | Plague Lords Empire of Xibalba - Book 1 | Alan Philipson | 0-373-62594-4 | December 2008 |
| 085 | Dark Resurrection Empire of Xibalba - Book 2 | Alan Philipson | 0-373-62595-2 | March 2009 |
| 086 | Eden's Twilight | Nick Pollotta | 0-373-62596-0 | June 2009 |
| 087 | Desolation Crossing | Andy Boot | 0-373-62597-9 | July 2009 |
| 088 | Alpha Wave | Rik Hoskin | 0-373-62598-7 | September 2009 |
| 089 | Time Castaways | Nick Pollotta | 0-373-62599-5 | December 2009 |
| 090 | Prophecy | Andy Boot | 0-373-62600-2 | January 2010 |
| 091 | Blood Harvest | Chuck Rogers | 0-373-62601-0 | March 2010 |
| 092 | Arcadian's Asylum | Andy Boot | 0-373-62602-9 | May 2010 |
| 093 | Baptism of Rage | Rik Hoskin | 0-373-62603-7 | July 2010 |
| 094 | Doom Helix | Alan Philipson | 0-373-62604-5 | September 2010 |
| 095 | Moonfeast | Nick Pollotta | 0-373-62605-3 | November 2010 |
| 096 | Downrigger Drift | John Helfers | 0-373-62606-1 | January 2011 |
| 097 | Playfair's Axiom | Victor Milán | 0-373-62607-X | March 2011 |
| 098 | Tainted Cascade | Nick Pollotta | 0-373-62608-8 | May 2011 |
| 099 | Perception Fault | John Helfers | 0-373-62609-6 | July 2011 |
| 100 | Prodigal's Return | Nick Pollotta | 0-373-62610-X | September 2011 |
| 101 | Lost Gates | Andy Boot | 0-373-62611-8 | November 2011 |
| 102 | Haven's Blight | Victor Milán | 0-373-62612-6 | January 2012 |
| 103 | Hell Road Warriors | Chuck Rogers | 0-373-62613-4 | March 2012 |
| 104 | Palaces of Light | Andy Boot | 0-373-62614-2 | May 2012 |
| 105 | Wretched Earth | Victor Milán | 0-373-62615-0 | July 2012 |
| 106 | Crimson Waters | Victor Milán | 0-373-62616-9 | September 2012 |
| 107 | No Man's Land | Victor Milán | 0-373-62617-7 | October 2012 |
| 108 | Nemesis | Victor Milán | 0-373-62618-5 | January 2013 |
| 109 | Chrono Spasm | Rik Hoskin | 0-373-62619-3 | March 2013 |
| 110 | Sins of Honor | Nick Pollotta | 0-373-62620-7 | May 2013 |
| 111 | Storm Breakers | Victor Milán | 0-373-62621-5 | July 2013 |
| 112 | Dark Fathoms | John Helfers | 0-373-62622-3 | September 2013 |
| 113 | Motherlode | Victor Milán | 0-373-62623-1 | November 2013 |
| 114 | Siren Song | Rik Hoskin | 0-373-62624-X | January 2014 |
| 115 | Hanging Judge | Victor Milán | 0-373-62625-8 | March 2014 |
| 116 | End Program | Rik Hoskin | 0-373-62626-6 | May 2014 |
| 117 | Desolation Angels | Victor Milán | 0-373-62627-4 | July 2014 |
| 118 | Blood Red Tide | Chuck Rogers | 0-373-62628-2 | September 2014 |
| 119 | Polestar Omega | Alan Philipson | 0-373-62629-0 | November 2014 |
| 120 | Hive Invasion | Travis Morgan | 0-373-62630-4 | January 2015 |
| 121 | End Day | Alan Philipson | 0-373-62631-2 | March 2015 |
| 122 | Forbidden Trespass | Victor Milán | 0-373-62632-0 | May 2015 |
| 123 | Iron Rage | Victor Milán | 0-373-62633-9 | July 2015 |
| 124 | Child of Slaughter | Robert T. Jeschonek | 0-373-62634-7 | September 2015 |
| 125 | Devil's Vortex | Victor Milán | 0-373-62635-5 | November 2015 |

Post-shutdown titles (audiobook exclusives)

Following the closure of Gold Eagle Publishing in 2015, Graphic Audio, the primary provider of audiobook adaptations of the Deathlands franchise, acquired the rights to produce more content for the series. All titles produced in-house by Graphic Audio are exclusively in a narrated audio drama format.

| Series # | Title | Date Released |
|---|---|---|
| 126 | Survival in Doubt | August 2016 |
| 127 | Gaia's Promise Cornerstone Saga - Book 1 | November 2016 |
| 128 | Bad Blood Cornerstone Saga - Book 2 | March 2017 |
| 129 | Angels of Our Nature Cornerstone Saga - Book 3 | June 2017 |
| 130 | City of Dark | September 2017 |
| 131 | Phreak Farm | December 2017 |
| 132 | Feeding Frenzy | July 2018 |
| 133 | Grim Choices | December 2018 |
| 134 | Glory's Stockpile | January 2019 |
| 135 | Killville | May 2019 |
| 136 | Trade War | December 2019 |
| 137 | Rift of the Magi | January 2020 |
| 138 | Who Lives and Who Dies | May 2020 |
| 139 | Exodus From Hell | September 2020 |
| 140 | Sea Hag | March 2021 |
| 141 | Hell Reclaimed | May 2021 |
| 142 | Into Delirium | September 2021 |
| 143 | Grave Capitol | October 2021 |
| 144 | Memory Box | January 2022 |
| 145 | Kraken | May 2022 |
| 146 | Red Letter Daze | July 2022 |
| 147 | Animal Kingdom | April 2023 |
| 148 | Caged Goddess | June 2023 |
| 149 | Extinction Generation | August 2023 |
| 150 | Devil's Redoubt | October 2023 |
| 151 | Outlands Warp | April 2024 |
| 152 | Cruel Seasons | October 2024 |
| 153 | Mutie Nation | December 2024 |
| 154 | Reaper's Peace | February 2025 |
| 155 | Doom Horizon | March 2025 |
| 156 | Cemetery Tango | September 2025 |
| 157 | Wraith Winter | November 2025 |
| 158 | Captive Souls | August 2026 |

== Adaptations ==
Deathlands also made it to film in 2003 as a low-budget telefilm that aired on the Sci-Fi Channel. Deathlands: Homeward Bound starred Vincent Spano and Traci Lords. Ryan, Krysty, J.B., and Jak were featured characters in the movie. Cannies (cannibals), sec men (security men), a war wag (war wagon), and a redoubt (bunker) were depicted in the movie. The characters of Doc Tanner and Lori Quint were absent from the movie.

All of the Deathlands and many of the Outlanders novels have been adapted to the Graphic Audio audiobook format. The Deathands Saga was initially produced by Random House Audio, but never completed. The adaptations have an average running time of nearly 8 hours, and utilizes a full cast, score, and sound effects. The Deathlands Graphic Audio series continued from the events of the books' end, with the first completely original story, Survival in Doubt, released in Fall 2016.

== Related works ==
Created in 1996 by Mark Ellis, Outlanders is the official sequel series to Deathlands, set a century after the original series. Outlanders provides a more expansive and complete backstory for the "Axlerverse" and the causes for the nuclear holocaust rather than relying on the "US vs. USSR" template. After 75 novels, the series ended in November 2015 with the closure of Gold Eagle. Graphic Audio have adapted the first 56 novels.

In 2022, Graphic Audio launched an audio-exclusive prequel series entitled The Trader, set in the 2080s, over a decade before the original series.
