= Feel (New York band) =

New York band

- Origin: New York City, New York, U.S.
- Genres: Garage; Boogie; Dance-pop
- Years active: 1982–1983; 1985–1989 (solo career)
- Labels: Buddah Records (UK); Sutra Records (USA)
- Past members: Gail Freeman

Feel was a New York City-based studio urban-oriented dance-pop band, active between 1982 and 1983. Originally consisted of Players Association arrangers and music producers Chris Hills and Danny Weiss, while vocals were provided by Gail Freeman. Freeman later released two singles titled "Mr. Right" (in 1985) and "Danger in the Airwaves" (in 1989). Freeman also played clavinet on Aurra's album Live and Let Live.

Feel's first record was "I'd Like To", released by Sutra Records in the United States and by Buddah Records in United Kingdom. The single reached number 53 on the Billboard Top Dance Singles chart and also was chosen into Top Single Picks, a list of recommended recordings published by Billboard. "I'd Like To" was then followed by "Let's Rock (Over & Over Again)", which was released in the same year by the same label and managed to reach #58 on the R&B Singles chart. Their next record "Got to Have Your Lovin'" released in 1983 was a change to electro-pop sound, yet without receiving any commercial success.

== Chart performance ==
Year	Title	Label	Peak chart positions	
Year	Title	Label	(United States) Dance	(United States) R&B
1982	"I'd Like To"	Sutra	53	―
1983	"Let's Rock (Over & Over Again)"	Sutra	―	58
1983	"Got to Have Your Lovin'"	Posse	―	―
1985	"Mr. Right" (as Gail Freeman)	Mirage	―	―
1989	"Danger in the Airwaves" (as Gail Freeman)	Sutra	―	―
"—" denotes releases that did not chart or were not released in that region.

== Discography ==
=== Singles ===
"I'd Like To"

U.S. 12" single^{(SUD 011)}	1. "I'd Like To" - 6:39; 2. "I'd Like To" (instrumental) - 6:53; Written-by: Chris Hills; Mixed-by: Chris Hills, Danny Weiss; Mastered-by: Herb Powers, Jr.

"Let's Rock"

U.S. 12" single^{(SUD 008)}	1. "Let's Rock (Over & Over Again)" - 7:46; 2. "Let's Rock (Over & Over Again)" (instrumental) - 7:26; Written-by: Chris Hills, Danny Weiss; Mixed-by: Chris Hills, Danny Weiss; Mastered-by: Herb Powers, Jr.

"Got To Have Your Lovin'"

U.S. 12" single^{(POS 1209)}	1. "Got To Have Your Lovin'" (Long Vocal Version) - 6:30; 2. "Got To Have Your Lovin'" (Short Vocal Version) - 4:37; 3. "Got To Have Your Lovin'" (Instrumental Version) - 7:10; Written-by: Chris Hills, Danny Weiss; Mixed-by: Chris Hills, Danny Weiss
