= James Axler =

American novelist

James Axler is a house name used by the publishing company Gold Eagle Publishing, the action adventure series published by Harlequin Enterprises Ltd.

The name was first used for the "Deathlands" series, which began in 1986 with Pilgrimage to Hell, co-written by Christopher Lowder (under the pseudonym Jack Adrian) and Laurence James. James went on to write the next 32 novels before dying on 9 February 2000. Under his own name and under the pen names James Darke, James McPhee, and James Axler, he also wrote books for the series "Dark Future", "Earth Blood", "Galactic Security Service" and "Survival 2000", as well as a number of independent novels and short stories.

The second writer to work under the Axler pen name was prolific author Mark Ellis. A comics creator and writer, Ellis created the cult-favorite character Death Hawk as well as adapting popular properties such as Doc Savage and The Wild Wild West.

Ellis contributed to Gold Eagle's The Executioner series and wrote three novels in the Deathlands series, with uncredited contributions to two others. In 1996 he created the popular Outlanders series. He has produced more books as "James Axler" than any other writer.

== Series ==
=== Deathlands ===
Front cover of Seedling

0 Encounter (1999) (by Alan Philipson)

1. Pilgrimage to Hell (1986) (by Jack Adrian and Laurence James)
2. Red Holocaust (1986) (by Laurence James)
3. Neutron Solstice (1987) (by Laurence James)
4. Crater Lake (1987) (by Laurence James)
5. Homeward Bound (1988) (by Laurence James)
6. Pony Soldiers (1988) (by Laurence James)
7. Dectra Chain (1988) (by Laurence James)
8. Ice and Fire (1988) (by Laurence James)
9. Red Equinox (1989) (by Laurence James)
10. Northstar Rising (1989) (by Laurence James)
11. Time Nomads (1990) (by Laurence James)
12. Latitude Zero (1991) (by Laurence James)
13. Seedling (1991) (by Laurence James)
14. Dark Carnival (1991) (by Laurence James)
15. Chill Factor (1992) (by Laurence James)
16. Moon Fate (1992) (by Laurence James)
17. Fury's Pilgrims (1993) (by Laurence James)
18. Shockscape (1993) (by Laurence James)
19. Deep Empire (1994) (by Laurence James)
20. Cold Asylum (1994) (by Laurence James)
21. Twilight Children (1994) (by Laurence James)
22. Rider, Reaper (1994) (by Laurence James)
23. Road Wars (1994) (by Laurence James)
24. Trader Redux (1994) (by Laurence James)
25. Genesis Echo (1995) (by Laurence James)
26. Shadowfall (1995) (by Laurence James)
27. Ground Zero (1995) (by Laurence James)
28. Emerald Fire (1995) (by Laurence James)
29. Bloodlines (1995) (by Laurence James)
30. Crossways (1996) (by Laurence James)
31. Keepers of the Sun (1996) (by Laurence James)
32. Circle Thrice (1996) (by Laurence James)
33. Eclipse at Noon (1996) (by Laurence James)
34. Stoneface (1996) (by Mark Ellis)
35. Bitter Fruit (1996) (by Mel Odom)
36. Skydark (1997) (by Alan Philipson)
37. Demons of Eden (1997) (by Mark Ellis)
38. The Mars Arena (1997) (by Mel Odom)
39. Watersleep (1997) (by Terry Collins)
40. Nightmare Passage (1997) (by Mark Ellis)
41. Freedom Lost (1998) (by Terry Collins)
42. Way of the Wolf (1998) (by Mel Odom)
43. Dark Emblem (1998) (by Terry Collins)
44. Crucible of Time (1998) (by Laurence James)
45. Starfall (1999) (by Mel Odom)
46. Gemini Rising (1999) (by Nick Pollotta)
47. Gaia's Demise (1999) (by Nick Pollotta)
48. Dark Reckoning (1999) (by Nick Pollotta)
49. Shadow World (2000) (by Alan Philipson)
50. Pandora's Redoubt (2000) (by Nick Pollotta)
51. Rat King (2000) (by Andy Boot)
52. Zero City (2000) (by Nick Pollotta)
53. Savage Armada (2001) (by Nick Pollotta)
54. Judas Strike (2001) (by Nick Pollotta)
55. Shadow Fortress (2001) (by Nick Pollotta)
56. Sunchild (2001) (by Andy Boot)
57. Breakthrough (2002) (by Alan Philipson)
58. Salvation Road (2002) (by Andy Boot)
59. Amazon Gate (2002) (by Unknown)
60. Destiny's Truth (2002) (by Unknown)
61. Skydark Spawn (2003) (by Edo Van Belkom)
62. Damnation Road Show (2003) (by Alan Philipson)
63. Devil Riders: Scorpion God - Book 1 (2003) (by Nick Pollotta)
64. Bloodfire: Scorpion God - Book 2 (2003) (by Nick Pollotta)
65. Hellbenders (2004) (by Andy Boot)
66. Separation (2004) (by Andy Boot)
67. Death Hunt (2004) (by Andy Boot)
68. Shaking Earth (2004) (by Victor Milan)
69. Black Harvest (2005) (by Edo Van Belkom)
70. Vengeance Trail (2005) (by Victor Milan)
71. Ritual Chill (2005 ) (by Andy Boot)
72. Atlantis Reprise (2005) (by Andy Boot)
73. Labyrinth (2006) (by Alan Philipson)
74. Strontium Swamp ( 2006) (by Andy Boot)
75. Shatter Zone - The ColdFire Project Book 1 (2006)(by Nick Pollotta)
76. Perdition Valley - The ColdFire Project Book 2 (2006) (by Nick Pollotta)
77. Cannibal Moon (2007) (by Alan Philipson)
78. Sky Raiders (2007) (by Nick Pollotta)
79. Remember Tomorrow (2007) (by Andy Boot)
80. Sunspot (2007) (by Alan Philipson)
81. Desert Kings (2008) (by Nick Pollotta)
82. Apocalypse Unborn (2008) (by Alan Philipson)
83. Thunder Road (2008) (by Andy Boot)
84. Plague Lords (2008) (by Alan Philipson)
85. Dark Resurrection (2009) (by Alan Philipson)
86. Eden's Twilight (2009)
87. Desolation Crossing (2009)
88. Alpha Wave (2009)
89. Time Castaways (2010)
90. Prophecy (2010)
91. Blood Harvest (2010)
92. Arcadian's Asylum (2010)
93. Baptism of Rage (2010)
94. Doom Helix (2010)
95. Moonfeast (2010)
96. Downrigger Drift (2011)
97. Playfair's Axiom (2011)
98. Tainted Cascade (2011)
99. Perception Fault (2011)
100. Prodigal's Return (2011)
101. Lost Gates (2011)
102. Haven's Blight (2012)
103. Hell Road Warriors (2012)
104. Palaces of Light (2012)
105. Wretched Earth (2012)
106. Crimson Waters (2012)
107. No Man's Land (2012)
108. Nemesis (2013)
109. Chrono Spasm (2013)
110. Sins of Honor (2013)
111. Storm Breakers (2013)
112. Dark Fathoms (2013)
113. Motherlode (2013)
114. Siren Song (2014)
115. Hanging Judge (2014)
116. End Program (2014)
117. Desolation Angels (2014)
118. Blood Red Tide (2014)
119. Polestar Omega (2014)
120. Hive Invasion (2015)
121. End Days (2015)
122. Forbidden Trespass (2015)
123. Iron Rage (2015)
124. Child of Slaughter (2015)
125. Devil's Vortex (2015)

=== Earth Blood ===
- Earth Blood (1993) (by Laurence James)
- Deep Trek (1994) (by Laurence James)
- Aurora Quest (1994) (by Laurence James)

=== Outlanders ===
1. Exile to Hell (1997) (by Mark Ellis)
2. Destiny Run (1997) (by Mark Ellis)
3. Savage Sun (1997) (by Mark Ellis)
4. Omega Path (1998) (by Mark Ellis)
5. Parallax Red (1998) (by Mark Ellis)
6. Doomstar Relic (1998) (by Mark Ellis)
7. Iceblood (1998) (by Mark Ellis)
8. Hellbound Fury - The Lost Earth Saga Book 1 (1999) (by Mark Ellis)
9. Night Eternal: The Lost Earth Saga Book 2 (1999) (by Mel Odom & Mark Ellis)
10. Outer Darkness - The Lost Earth Saga Book 3 (1999) (by Mark Ellis)
11. Armageddon Axis (1999) (by Mark Ellis)
12. Wreath of Fire (2000) (by Mel Odom with additional material by Mark Ellis)
13. Shadow Scourge (2000) (by Mark Ellis)
14. Hell Rising (2000) (by Mark Ellis)
15. Doom Dynasty (2000) (by Mark Ellis)
16. Tigers of Heaven - The Imperator Wars Book 2 (2001) (by Mark Ellis)
17. Purgatory Road - The Imperator Wars Book 3 (2001) (by Mark Ellis)
18. Sargasso Plunder (2001) (by Mel Odom)
19. Tomb of Time (2001) (by Mark Ellis)
20. Prodigal Chalice (2002) (by Mel Odom)
21. Devil in the Moon: The Dragon Kings, Book 1 (2002) (by Mark Ellis)
22. Dragoneye: The Dragon Kings, Book 2 (2002) (by Mark Ellis)
23. Far Empire (2002) (by Mark Ellis)
24. Equinox Zero (2002) (by Mark Ellis)
25. Talon and Fang (2003) (by Mark Ellis)
26. Sea of Plague: Heart of the World: Book 2 (2003) (by Mark Ellis)
27. Awakening (2003) (by Victor Milán)
28. Mad God's Wrath (2004) (by Mark Ellis)
29. Sun Lor' (2004) (by Victor Milán)
30. Mask of the Sphinx (2004) (by Mark Ellis)
31. Uluru Destiny (2004) (by Victor Milán)
32. Evil Abyss (2005) (by Mark Ellis)
33. Children of the Serpent (2005) (by Mark Ellis)
34. Successors (2005) (by Victor Milán)
35. Cerberus Storm (2005) (by Mark Ellis)
36. Refuge (2006) (by Victor Milán)
37. Rim Of the World (2006) (by Mark Ellis)
38. Lords of the Deep (2006) (by Victor Milán)
39. Hydra's Ring (2006) (by Mark Ellis)
40. Closing the Cosmic Eye (2007) (by Victor Milán)
41. Skull Throne (2007) (by Mark Ellis)
42. Satan's Seed (2007) (by Mark Ellis)
43. Dark Goddess (2007) (by Mark Ellis)
44. Grailstone Gambit (2008) (by Mark Ellis)
45. Ghostwalk (2008) (by Mark Ellis)
46. Pantheon of Vengeance (2008) (by Douglas Wojtowicz)
47. Death Cry (2008) (by Rik Hoskin)
48. Serpent's Tooth (2009) (by Douglas Wojtowicz)
49. Shadow Box (2009) (by Rik Hoskin)
50. Janus Trap (2009) (by Rik Hoskin)
51. Warlord of the Pit (2009) (by Mark Ellis)
52. Reality Echo (2010) (by Douglas Wojtowicz)
53. Infinity Breach (2010) (by Rik Hoskin)
54. Oblivion Stone (2010) (by Rik Hoskin)
55. Distortion (Offensive 2010) (by Rik Hoskin)
56. Cradle of Destiny (2011) (by Douglas Wojtowicz)
57. Scarlet Dream (2011) (by Rik Hoskin)
58. Truth Engine (2011) (by Rik Hoskin)
59. Infestation Cubed (2011) (by Douglas Wojtowicz)
60. Planet Hate (2012) (by Rik Hoskin)
61. Dragon City (2012) (by Rik Hoskin)
62. God War (2012) (by Rik Hoskin)
63. Genesis Sinister (2012) (by Rik Hoskin)
64. Savage Dawn (2013) (by Douglas Wojtowicz)
65. Sorrow Space (2013) (by Rik Hoskin)
66. Immortal Twilight (2013) (by Rik Hoskin)
67. Cosmic Rift (2013) (by Rik Hoskin)
68. Wings of Death (2014) (by Douglas Wojtowicz)
69. Necropolis (2014) (by Douglas Wojtowicz)
70. Shadow Born (2014) (by Douglas Wojtowicz)

More information about this series and the above Outlanders titles is available as part of the Outlanders article.
