= Nick Pollotta =

American novelist

Nick Pollotta (August 26, 1954 – April 13, 2013 in Chicago) was an American author. He is best known for his humorous novels, including the science-fiction novel, Illegal Aliens (with Phil Foglio) and the fantasy novels Bureau 13 and That Darn Squid God (with James Clay). The majority of his work was published by Gold Eagle Books under house names "James Axler" and "Don Pendleton." he died of cancer on April 13, 2013. A former stand-up comic, he lived in Chicago with his wife Melissa née Hutchings. He had three sons.

== Bibliography ==
1989

- Illegal Aliens, SF/Humor, Nick Pollotta and Phil Foglio, TSR BOOKS

1990

- Bureau 13, Fantasy/Humor, Nick Pollotta, Ace Books

1991

- Doomsday Exam, Fantasy/Humor, Nick Pollotta, Ace Books
- Full Moonster, Fantasy/Humor, Nick Pollotta, Ace Books

1993

- Satellite Night News, SF/Humor, (as Jack Hopkins), Ace Books
- Satellite Night Special, SF/Humor, (as Jack Hopkins), Ace Books
- Satellite Night Fever, SF/Humor, (as Jack Hopkins), Ace Books

1994

- Illegal Aliens, SF/Humor, Nick Pollotta & Phil Foglio, Armada Press, Russia (translation)

1995

- Bureau 13 Omnibus, Fantasy/Humor, Nick Pollotta, Armada Press, RUSSIA (translation)
- American Knights, YA/SF, Nick Pollotta, TSR Books
- The 24-Hour War, YA/SF, Nick Pollotta, TSR Books
- Freed-For-All, YA/SF, Nick Pollotta, TSR Books
- The Guardians of Cascade, Fantasy/Humor, Nick Pollotta, TSR Books

1997

- Shadowboxer, Science Fiction, Nicholas Pollotta, ROC Books

1999

- Gemini Rising, Action/Adventure (as James Axler), Gold Eagle Books, 1999

2000

- Gaia's Demise, Action/Adventure (as James Axler), Gold Eagle Books
- Dark Reckoning, Action/Adventure (as James Axler), Gold Eagle Books
- Pandora's Redoubt, Action/Adventure (as James Axler), Gold Eagle Books

2001

- Zero City, Action/Adventure (as James Axler), Gold Eagle Books
- Savage Armada, Action/Adventure (as James Axler), Gold Eagle Books
- Judas Strike, Action/Adventure (as James Axler), Gold Eagle Books
- Shadow Fortress, Action/Adventure (as James Axler), Gold Eagle Books

2002

- Sky Killers, Action/Adventure, (as Don Pendleton) Gold Eagle Books
- Deep Rampage, Action/Adventure, (as Don Pendleton), Gold Eagle Books

2003

- Devil Riders, Action/Adventure (as James Axler), Gold Eagle Books

2004

- Blood Fire, Action/Adventure (as James Axler), Gold Eagle Books
- Sky Baron, Action/Adventure, (as James Axler), Gold Eagle Books
- Stolen Arrows, Action/Adventure, (as Don Pendleton), Gold Eagle Books
- The Chameleon Factor, Action/Adventure, (as Don Pendleton), Gold Eagle Books
- Pandora's Redoubt, Action/Adventure, (as James Axler) Cutting Audio, audio book
- Zero City, Action/Adventure, (as James Axler) Cutting Audio, audio book
- Gemini Rising, Action/Adventure, (as James Axler) Cutting Audio, audio book
- Dark Reckoning, Action/Adventure, (as James Axler) Cutting Audio, audio book
- Gaia's Demise, Action/Adventure, (as James Axler) Cutting Audio, audio book
- That Darn Squid God, Fantasy/Humor, Nick Pollotta & James Clay, Wildside Press

2005

- Shatterzone, Action/Adventure, (as James Axler), Gold Eagle Books
- Savage Armada, Action/Adventure, (as James Axler) Cutting Audio, audio book
- Judas Strike, Action/Adventure, (as James Axler) Cutting Audio, audio book
- Shadow Fortress, Action/Adventure, (as James Axler) Cutting Audio, audio book
- The Chameleon Factor, Action/Adventure, (as Don Pendleton) Cutting Audio, audio book
- Bloodfire, Action/Adventure, (as James Axler) Cutting Audio, audio book
- Devil Riders, Action/Adventure, (as James Axler) Cutting Audio, audio book

2006

- Coldfire, Action/Adventure, (as James Axler), Gold Eagle Books
- Act of War, Action/Adventure, (as Don Pendleton), Gold Eagle Books
- Perdition Valley, Action/Adventure (as James Axler) Cutting Audio, audio book

2007

- Uplink, Action/Adventure, (as Don Pendleton), Gold Eagle Books
- Neutron Force, Action/Adventure, (as Don Pendleton), Gold Eagle Books
- Desert King, Action/Adventure, (as James Axler), Gold Eagle Books
- Shatterzone, Action/Adventure (as James Axler) Cutting Audio, audio book
- Sky Hammer, Action/Adventure (as Don Pendleton), Cutting Audio, audio book
- Illegal Aliens, SF/Humor, Nick Pollotta & Phil Foglio, AST Press, Russia (translation)
- That Darn Squid God, Fantasy/Humor, Nick Pollotta & James Clay, AST Press, Russia (translation)

2008

- Terror Descending, Action/Adventure, (as Don Pendleton), Gold Eagle Books
- Eden's Twilight, Action/Adventure, (as James Axler), Gold Eagle Books
- Capital Offense, Action/Adventure, (as James Axler), Gold Eagle Books

2009

- Last Days, Action/Adventure, (as Don Pendleton), Gold Eagle Books
- Airwolf, Action/Adventure, (as Don Pendleton), Gold Eagle Books
- Time Castaways, Action/Adventure, (as Don Pendleton), Gold Eagle Books
- Illegal Aliens SF/Humor, Nick Pollotta & Phil Foglio, Wildside Press

2010

- Moonfeast, Action/Adventure, (as James Axler), Gold Eagle Books
- Blood Chains, Action/Adventure, (as James Axler), Gold Eagle Books
- Damned Nation, Dark Fantasy, Nick Pollotta, Wildside Press

2011

- Prodigal Return, Action/Adventure, (as James Axler), Gold Eagle Books
- Dragonfire, Action/Adventure (as Don Pendleton), Gold Eagle Books

2012

- Belle, Book and Candle, Paranormal Romance, Nick Pollotta, Double Dragon Press
- Shadow Strike, Action/Adventure (as Don Pendleton), Gold Eagle Books
- Fireburst, Action/Adventure (as Don Pendleton), Gold Eagle Books
- Oblivion Pact, Action/Adventure (as Don Pendleton), Gold Eagle Books

2013

- Sins of Honor, Action/Adventure (as James Axler), Gold Eagle Books

2014

- Pirate Offensive, Action/Adventure (as Don Pendelton), Gold Eagle Books
