= Latitude Zero (novel) =

1991 novel by Laurence James

- Author: Laurence James
- Language: English
- Series: Deathlands series
- Genre: Science fiction, post-apocalyptic
- Publisher: Harlequin Enterprises Ltd (USA)
- Publication date: April 1991
- Publication place: United States
- Media type: Print (Paperback)
- Pages: 349
- ISBN: 0-373-62512-X (first edition)
- OCLC: 24912138
- Preceded by: Time Nomads
- Followed by: Seedling

Latitude Zero is a science fiction novel by Laurence James, written under the house name James Axler. It is the twelfth book in the series of Deathlands.

== Plot Synopsis ==
Having narrowly escaped the self-destruction of the last redoubt they jumped to, Ryan Cawdor and his friends find themselves in the southwestern desert somewhere near the border of New Mexico and Texas. The group sets out South, hoping to find food and supplies, and possibly surviving "freezies" in a cryonics facility that the late Rick Ginsberg believed was located in the area.

Soon the group comes to a prosperous ranch and are nearly shot by the residents, who have mistaken them for members of a local group of raiders. Once Ryan convinces the residents that they are not in any way associated with Skullface, the feared leader of the raiders, they are cautiously welcomed in. The ranch belongs to the Ballinger family, consisting of a widowed father, his two sons, and his daughter. The daughter, Christina, takes an immediate liking to Jak Lauren, but is impeded by her verbally and physically abusive father.

That evening the men of the family are revealed to be serial rapists and murderers: the two brothers enter the room housing Krysty Wroth and Mildred Wyeth, plainly stating their intent to rape and kill them, while the father keeps armed watch outside. The women are able to kill the brothers while Jak silently kills their father. Christina, upon learning of the death of the rest of her family, says only one thing: "good."

Continuing south, the companions link up with a West-bound wagon train, where they serve as scouts and protection against hostile mutants who roam the area. After several days of travel they bring the settlers to a seemingly abandoned town, but while most of the companions are out scouting for additional supplies the town's current residents return: Skullface and his gang of raiders. Everyone but the scouting party is captured, including Mildred and Dr. Theophilus Tanner. Doc is shaken to the core when he recognizes Skullface as none other than former sec-boss Cort Strasser.

Strasser attempts to draw out Ryan and his friends, first by organizing a sweep of the town, then later by arranging a murderous lottery in revenge for the six gang members killed by Ryan and his friends during the sweep. Acting on Mildred's cue, the uncaptured companions attack during the final stages of the lottery. They kill more than half of Strasser's remaining gang, but not before those same men kill fully half the wagon train settlers in the chaotic firefight. The six companions reunite and head off after Strasser.

The pursuit is long and marked by violence, with the companions narrowly evading ambushes and attacks as they pursue Strasser by railcar, then foot, and eventually on rafts down the wild flowing waters of the Grandee. Strasser takes Mildred hostage during one encounter and flees with her to a heavily damaged redoubt; his gang is completely wiped out by the time he reaches it, leaving him alone with Mildred.

After the chase winds through the ruins of the redoubt, and after Strasser tries and fails (with Mildred's intervention) to kill Ryan with a long-range sniper rifle, Cort convinces Ryan to agree to a fight to the death, armed only with knives, to bring the pursuit to a final end. The fight takes place on a rapidly decaying wire bridge over perilous terrain riddled with quicksand, which greatly hampers both fighters. Finally Ryan deliberately causes the bridge to snap, dropping the two men to the ground below. Strasser lands in a quicksand pit, and as Ryan watches from relative safety Cort demands he be shot to end it quickly; Ryan refuses. Rather than face death by suffocation, Strasser slits his own throat.

Although the redoubt is mostly destroyed, including the attached cryonics facility Ryan had hoped held survivors, the MAT-TRANS facility is undamaged. As the companions prepare to make the next jump Jak states that he is not going; Ryan correctly guesses that this is because Jak intends to stay with Christina Ballinger and start a family. Jak is given a fond farewell before he departs. The rest of the group enters the chamber and makes the jump to the next location.

== Cultural references ==
The lottery Cort Strasser organizes directly references the short story "The Lottery" a number of times, notably as the first person who volunteer to take a stone is named Shirley Jackson.
