= Feeley Township, Itasca County, Minnesota =

Feeley Township, Minnesota
- Township
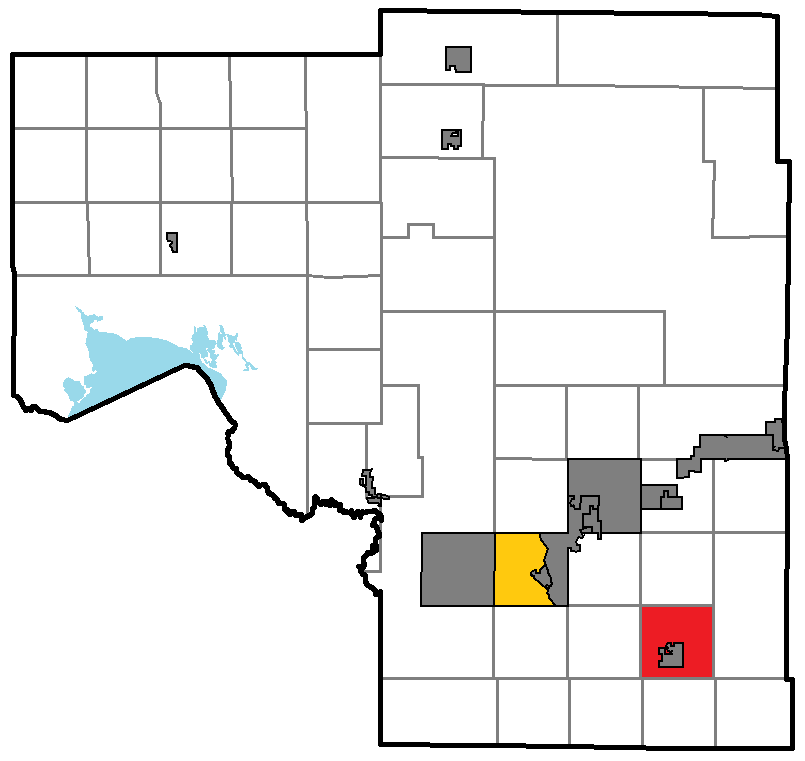
- Location of Feeley Township, within Itasca County, Minnesota
- Coordinates: 47°8′21″N 93°16′21″W
- Country: United States
- State: Minnesota
- County: Itasca

Area
  - Total: 32.7 sq mi (84.6 km^{2})
  - Land: 31.5 sq mi (81.7 km^{2})
  - Water: 1.1 sq mi (2.9 km^{2})
- Elevation: 1,289 ft (393 m)

Population (2020)
  - Total: 307
  - Density: 9.73/sq mi (3.76/km^{2})
- Time zone: UTC-6 (Central (CST))
  - Summer (DST): UTC-5 (CDT)
- FIPS code: 27-20816
- GNIS feature ID: 0664155

Feeley Township is a township in Itasca County, Minnesota, United States. The population was 307 at the 2020 census.

Feeley Township was named for Thomas J. Feeley, a lumberman.

== Geography ==
According to the United States Census Bureau, the township has a total area of 32.7 square miles (85 km^{2}), of which 31.6 square miles (82 km^{2}) is land and 1.1 square miles (2.8 km^{2}), or 3.43%, is water.

== Demographics ==
As of the census of 2000, there were 327 people, 134 households, and 97 families residing in the township. The population density was 10.4 inhabitants per square mile (4.0/km^{2}). There were 187 housing units at an average density of 5.9 per square mile (2.3/km^{2}). The racial makeup of the township was 100.00% White. Hispanic or Latino of any race were 0.31% of the population.

There were 134 households, out of which 27.6% had children under the age of 18 living with them, 66.4% were married couples living together, 3.0% had a female householder with no husband present, and 26.9% were non-families. 20.9% of all households were made up of individuals, and 9.7% had someone living alone who was 65 years of age or older. The average household size was 2.44 and the average family size was 2.82.

In the township the population was spread out, with 21.1% under the age of 18, 6.1% from 18 to 24, 26.0% from 25 to 44, 25.1% from 45 to 64, and 21.7% who were 65 years of age or older. The median age was 44 years. For every 100 females, there were 109.6 males. For every 100 females age 18 and over, there were 118.6 males.

The median income for a household in the township was $40,625, and the median income for a family was $49,375. Males had a median income of $42,500 versus $19,375 for females. The per capita income for the township was $17,469. About 5.9% of families and 10.4% of the population were below the poverty line, including 16.4% of those under age 18 and 11.1% of those age 65 or over.
