= Pilgrimage to Hell =

1986 novel by Laurence James

- Author: Christopher Lowder and Laurence James
- Language: English
- Series: Deathlands series
- Genre: Science fiction Post-apocalyptic novel
- Publisher: Harlequin Enterprises Ltd (USA)
- Publication date: June 1986
- Publication place: United States
- Media type: Print (Paperback)
- Pages: 381
- ISBN: 0-373-62501-4 (first edition)
- OCLC: 14206528
- Preceded by: Encounter
- Followed by: Red Holocaust

Pilgrimage to Hell is the first book in the Deathlands saga of novels. Written by Christopher Lowder under his pen name Jack Adrian and Laurence James under his pen name James Axler published on May 1, 1986, it follows the adventures of Ryan Cawdor, Krysty Wroth, and J.B. Dix, and delves into how they met.

== Plot ==
A major character of the saga who appears in this novel is the Trader, who appears occasionally in future novels. It also brings Doc Tanner (a senile-sounding gentleman with knowledge of pre-war America) into the group, and gives the audience their first glance at one of the series' long-running mutant menaces: stickies.

This book also introduces the redoubts, in particular the Cerberus Redoubt, and the MAT-TRANS teleportation chambers that are a major plot device driving the series.

== Characters Introduced/Leaving ==
- Ryan Cawdor (Introduced)
- Krysty Wroth (Introduced)
- J.B. Dix (Introduced)
- Dr. Theophilus Tanner (Introduced)
- Okie (Introduced)
- Hunaker (Introduced)
- Hennings (Introduced)
- Finnagan (Introduced)
- The Trader (Introduced)
