= Red Equinox =

1989 novel by Laurence James

- Author: Laurence James
- Language: English
- Series: Deathlands series
- Genre: Science fiction Post-apocalyptic novel
- Publisher: Harlequin Enterprises Ltd (USA)
- Publication date: June 1989
- Publication place: United States
- Media type: Print (Paperback)
- Pages: 299
- ISBN: 0-373-62509-X (first edition)
- OCLC: 20097284
- LC Class: CPB Box no. 2651 vol. 24
- Preceded by: Ice and Fire
- Followed by: Northstar Rising

Red Equinox is the ninth book in the series of Deathlands. It was written by Laurence James under the house name James Axler.

== Plot Synopsis ==
Waking from their latest jump, Ryan Cawdor and his friends find themselves in a MAT-TRANS chamber which is smaller than the norm. This curious change is overshadowed by their next discovery: the chamber door release latch is stuck, leaving the group no way to leave the chamber and no way to start another MAT-TRANS jump to a different redoubt. After numerous unsuccessful attempts to make the mechanism work, Krysty Wroth calls upon her mutant strength and forces the door open. This frees the group but breaks the latch mechanism completely, rendering the MAT-TRANS inoperable. Rick Ginsberg, a cryonic patient from 2001 who was "thawed" by Ryan, estimates that he can fix the mechanism, but will need at least basic tools to do so.

The remainder of the redoubt is unusually small and limited, lacking the usual assortment of rooms and equipment. The only exit leads up a long, spiraling metal staircase which eventually comes out in a secret door built into the attic chimney of a partially fire-destroyed dacha. Finally able to see the sky, J. B. Dix uses his pocket sextant to find their approximate location; to his disbelief, the latest jump has taken him and his friends somewhere near Moscow.

After taking food and clothing from hostile residents of a nearby town, Ryan, J. B. and Krysty head out to obtain tools to repair the MAT-TRANS chamber. Their progress is halted when they are nearly shot by a Russian government security patrol. Realizing they need to be able to understand the local language to avoid further incidents, the group returns to the dacha for Rick, who is fluent in Russian. Rick protests at first, revealing that his ALS is no longer in remission and is making him progressively weaker, but relents when it becomes clear there is no other option if they are to find tools.

Meanwhile, in the Russian government capital (located in the suburbs near the heavily bombed ruins of Moscow), the recently promoted Major-Commissar Gregori Zimyanin has been following reports of the group's actions. The descriptions of the people involved stir memories of his encounter with a one-eyed American in Alaska. Despite orders to the contrary, Zimyanin continues his investigation, culling reports for suspicious behavior or crimes committed by one-eyed men.

On the advice of several locals, Ryan, Krysty, and Rick travel to the Russian War Museum in order to learn more about the current Russian government. Shortly thereafter Zimyanin arrives at the Museum, having estimated the group's likely path and assuming they would not be able to ignore the Museum. Ryan spots Zimyanin, immediately recognizing him, and hastens the group's progress through the Museum. On the way through they come across an ill-visited side exhibit which unexpectedly holds all the tools Rick needs to fix the MAT-TRANS chamber, presumably looted from the nearby dacha. The three resolve to come back at night when the Museum is closed to retrieve the tools.

With Zimyanin closing in from the front entrance and soldiers moving to set up roadblocks, Ryan and his friends move to leave through the back, only to discover that the back exit goes past the most popular (and monitored) exhibit: a tattered American flag, which attendees are expected to spit on. All three are nearly overcome with disgust, and Rick balks at following through, but in the end all three spit on the flag and leave unnoticed. As they leave Rick demands that the flag be taken as well when they return in the evening.

With Rick's condition rapidly worsening, Ryan and Kristy return to the Museum without him. The tools are stolen easily, their cases not even locked, but taking the American flag trips an alarm and alerts Museum security. Ryan and Kristy shoot their way through the confused guards and escape.

Ultimately Zimyanin is able to track the group's path back to the abandoned American dacha, following a path of violent firefights and other crimes, while the group works quickly to repair the MAT-TRANS door under the guidance of Rick, who is entering the final, fatal stages of ALS. Zimyanin's forces attack the dacha as repairs are nearing completion, and Rick asks to be left behind with cans of gasoline and a pyrotab to cover the escape. Ryan and the others are able to hold off the Russians long enough for the door to be repaired; before they leave Rick, wrapped in the rescued American flag, asks for one last favor, to hear The Star-Spangled Banner before he dies. With Doc's help the group tearfully sings the anthem for Rick, who dies before the song is finished.

Zimyanin manages to make it to the hidden redoubt during this time, and enters the control room just as Ryan hurls the burning pyrotab into the gas-soaked room before closing the chamber door; Zimyanin narrowly avoids being killed by the ensuing fire. As the MAT-TRANS activates he runs through the fire and quickly enters the chamber, intent on killing the now-incapacitated Ryan. Ryan is aware of Zimyanin's hands around his neck as the jump continues, but is unable to do anything as he slides into unconsciousness.

== Characters Introduced/Leaving ==
Richard Ginsberg (Died of ALS)

Zorro the dog (Introduced)
