= Laurence James =

British writer

Laurence James (21 September 1942 – 9 or 10 February 2000) was a British science fiction writer, especially known for his involvement with the "Deathlands" series.

After a variety of other jobs (scaffolding, teaching, bookselling, trawler-hand, lumberjack and short-order cook in a greasy spoon) James worked publishing other people's books. In 1972 he embarked on the career of "a full-time freelance author and journalist". For several years thereafter he published short science fiction stories in both Britain and the US.

In 1974 he published his first full-length novel, "Earth Lies Sleeping" – the first in a series focused on the exploits of a galactic secret agent named Simon Rack. At the time he was living with his wife and their three children in Roydon, an Essex village. In addition, around 1974, James published the fantasy saga of Hells Angels in England & Wales in the early 1990s under the name Mick Norman. The four books, Angels from Hell, Angel Challenge, Guardian Angels, and Angels on my Mind, were compiled as the Angel Chronicles (Creation Books, ISBN 1-871592-43-7).

Also in 1974 James' publisher at the time, Sphere Books, provided the reading public with a list of "what Laurence James likes" – including Alf Tupper, Wilson and Braddock, old films, old comics, and Rock 'n' roll. The biographical page of "New Life For Old" adds John Stewart, Buddy Holly, The Drifters and Sha Na Na to his likes. Among what he disliked were suits, gherkins and earwigs.

Thereafter, James embarked on a highly prolific career, publishing dozens of novels under his own name as well as the pen names James Darke, James McPhee, Jonathan May, and James Axler. His writings included books for the series "Dark Future," "Earth Blood," "Galactic Security Service" and "Survival 2000," as well as a number of independent novels and short stories.

His biggest success was the post apocalyptic "Deathlands" series. "Pilgrimage to Hell" () which launched the series was started in 1986 by Christopher Lowder, completed by James and published under the name James Axler. He also continued the 'Confessions' sex comedy franchise begun by Christopher Wood (as "Timothy Lea"), writing a further 12 books under the pseudonym "Jonathan May",

James then went on to write solely no fewer than 32 novels in this series, attracting a significant fandom, up to and including Eclipse at Noon in 1995.

Due to failing health, James was on that year forced to leave the series. He wrote one last novel, Crucible of Time that appeared in 1998.

He died in February 2000. After his death, "James Axler" remained a "House name" which continued to be used by others. In general, "Deathlands" fans consider his books to be the best of the series.
