= Tri-Tac Inc Systems Shield =

Tri-Tac Inc Systems Shield is a 1983 role-playing game supplement published by Tri Tac Games for Fringeworthy.

== Contents ==
Tri-Tac Inc Systems Shield is a supplement in which a gamemaster's screen is designed for use with the role-playing games Fringeworthy, FTL: 2448, and Stalking the Night Fantastic.

== Publication history ==
Tri-Tac Inc Systems Shield was written by Richard Tucholka and published by Tri-Tac Inc. in 1983 as seven cardstock sheets.
