= 1992 in games =

Several board and card games, wargames, miniatures games, and tabletop role-playing games were published in 1992.

== Games released or invented in 1992 ==
- Advanced Third Reich
- Battle Masters
- Dangerous Journeys (role-playing game)
- Dark Seed
- Dream Park: The Roleplaying Game
- Eurocracy
- Fast Food Franchise
- Forbidden Bridge
- Fringeworthy 3rd Edition (role-playing game)
- Hacker
- Harassment
- Incursion (role-playing game)
- Minion Hunter
- Modern Art
- Nephilim (role-playing game)
- Nippon Rails
- North American Rails
- Over the Edge (role-playing game)
- Outrage!
- Rap Rat
- Spectrangle
- SPQR
- Studs
- Thin Ice
- Werewolf: The Apocalypse (role-playing game)

== Game awards given in 1992 ==
- Spiel des Jahres: Um Reifenbreite
- Deutscher Spiele Preis: Flying Dutchman (German: der Fliegende Holländer)
  - Best Children's Game: Schweinsgalopp
- Games: Pipeline

== Significant game-related events in 1992 ==
- Queen Games was founded by Rajive Gupta.

== Deaths ==
Date	Name	Age	Notability
August 19	Curtis M. Scott	31	Role-playing game designer

== See also ==
- 1992 in video gaming
