= Hellsnight =

Hellsnight is a 1984 role-playing game adventure published by Tri Tac Games for Stalking the Night Fantastic.

== Plot summary ==
Hellsnight is an adventure in which seven short adventure scenarios are included along with new rules, and is also able to be used with the game Fringeworthy.

== Publication history ==
Hellsnight was written by Richard Tucholka, Karl Koenig, and David Peters, and was published by Tri Tac Inc. in 1984 as a 32-page book.
