= Cop 2448 =

Cop 2448 is a 1986 role-playing game supplement published by Tri Tac Games for FTL:2448.

== Contents ==
Cop 2448 is a supplement in which police and law enforcement in the future are explored. It includes detailed descriptions of futuristic police work and features two adventure scenarios.

== Publication history ==
Cop 2448 was written by Richard Tucholka and Kreig Branden and published by Tri-Tac Inc. in 1986 as a 32-page book.
