= Invasion U.S.! =

Invasion U.S.! is a 1984 role-playing game supplement published by Tri Tac Games for Fringeworthy.

== Contents ==
Invasion U.S.! is a supplement in which the United States is depicted under Soviet control. It explores the impact of Soviet oppression on American society and the changes that have occurred as a result.

== Publication history ==
Invasion U.S.! was written by Richard Tucholka and published by Tri-Tac Inc. in 1984 as a 30-page book, first with a blue and red cover and then a black and red cover.
