= Bureau 13 =

1992 horror role-playing game

Stalking the Night Fantastic
- Cover by Phil Foglio
- Designers: Richard Tucholka
- Publishers: Tri Tac Games
- Publication: 1992; 33 years ago
- Genres: Contemporary horror
- Systems: Tri Tac system

Bureau 13: Stalking the Night Fantastic is a satirical science fiction/horror tabletop role-playing game published by Tri Tac Games in 1992.

== Description ==
Bureau 13 describes the operations of a fictional top-secret American government agency that investigates and combats supernatural events and creatures.

=== Game mechanics ===
The game uses the role-playing game system common to other Tri Tac releases such as Fringeworthy and FTL:2448:

- Characters are defined by eight basic characteristics (Strength, Constitution, Dexterity, Agility, Intelligence, Wisdom, Luck, Charisma), which are generated by rolling four 6-sided dice.
- The player uses a point-buy system to generate skills. Skills are then multiplied by 5.
- To resolve a skill check, the player use percentile dice and must roll a score equal to or less than the skill being tested.

== Publication history ==
Bureau 13 is published by Tri Tac, and is a revamp of their previous publication Stalking the Night Fantastic, and included an extra 90 pages of material. Stalking the Night Fantastic was first published by Tri Tac in 1983, and a second edition was released the following year, accompanied by a number of standalone adventures. The third edition, retitled Bureau 13, featured a somewhat streamlined game system, and was released in 1990 as a 190-page softcover book designed by Richard Tucholka, with interior artwork by Tom Dow, with artistic contributions by Randy Bathurst, Doug Blanchard, Larry Dixon, Sandy Harlan, Tom Howell, Bradley McDevitt, Scott Ruggels, and William Wardrop, and cover art by Phil Foglio.

This was followed by a 4th edition in 1992, a 5th edition in 2007, and a 6th edition in 2008 that uses d20 System mechanics.

== Reception ==
In the January 1995 issue of Shadis, Dirk Dejong thought the game "includes a decent magic system and a well-thought out array of monsters to start your adventures with." He found a lot to like, writing, "though the premise is not new, it's done in an eminently playable style." Dejong did note that if there was a balance in horror games between what the characters should react like and how the players instead control the characters, "Bureau 13 leans to player control, as opposed to character reaction."

== Awards ==
In 1991, the third edition of the Bureau 13 series won the Gamers Choice Award at Gencon for Best Fantasy Game.

== List of releases ==
=== Role-playing game ===
- Stalking the Night Fantastic (1st Ed.), Tri Tac Games (1983) – Core Rules. ASIN B0039L72BC
- Stalking the Night Fantastic (2nd Ed.), Tri Tac Games (1984) – Core Rules. ASIN B00A8MNZKC
- Bureau 13: Stalking the Night Fantastic (3rd Ed., 1st printing), Tri Tac Games (1990) – Core Rules. Has Phil Foglio art on the cover, title in script font. ISBN 9990371245
- Bureau 13: Stalking the Night Fantastic (3rd Ed., 2nd printing), Tri Tac Games (1992) – Core Rules. Has Phil Foglio art on the cover, title in block font. ISBN 9990371245
- Bureau 13 Adventures: Hellsnight – Contains 7 new scenarios, new equipment, new vehicles and new "Friends & Enemies" information.
- Bureau 13 Adventures: Haunts – Contains new scenarios, new equipment and tools, new vehicles and new "Friends & Enemies" information.
- The Lost Files, Vol. 1 by Richard Tucholka, Tri Tac Games (1991) – Loose-leaf packet full of recently recovered information from Bureau 13's files.
- Bureau 13: Scenes of Horror, Industry and Adventure
- Incursion by Richard Tucholka, Tri Tac Games (1992) ASIN B000KGYLJK
- Stalking the Steel City by Bruce Sheffer, Outpost Games (1992) ASIN B000KGYLJK
- Screams in the Night by Bruce Sheffer, Outpost Games (1994) ASIN B00129GQ9M
- Aliens Among Us by Bruce Sheffer, Outpost Games (1995)] ASIN B003IQZH8S
- Bureau 13: Stalking the Night Fantastic (4th Ed.) Tri Tac Games (1992) – PDF file version of the 3rd Edition Core Rules.
- Bureau 13 (4th Ed.): Black Powder – The Origins of Bureau 13 (1859–1889), Tri Tac Games (2009) – 19th Century setting detailing the founding of Bureau 13 and the real US Secret Service.
- Bureau 13 (5th Ed.): Special Edition by Nick Pollotta & Richard Tucholka, Tri Tac Games (2007)] – Incorporates the world of Nick Pollotta's B13 novels.
- Bureau 13 (6th Ed.): d20 EDITION Tri Tac Games (2008)] – Has an expanded "Friends and Enemies" section.
- Bureau 13: EXTREME, Tri Tac Games (2011)] – Details the X Teams – paranormal SWAT units that take out the big threats. Contains 5 new scenarios that are linked in the "Hearts" campaign. It is a much more gritty setting than baseline Bureau 13.
- Bureau 13: BRASS & STEAM, Tri Tac Games (2013?) – Steampunk rules.

=== Novels ===
- Bureau 13 by Nick Pollotta, Ace Books (1991). ISBN 978-0441084203
- Doomsday Exam by Nick Pollotta, Ace Books (1992). ISBN 978-0441158669
- Full Moonster by Nick Pollotta, Ace Books (1992). ISBN 978-0441084210
- Bureau 13: Judgment Night by Nick Pollotta, Wildside Press (2000). ISBN 978-1587153099 Reprint/update of original 1991 novel.
- Bureau 13: Doomsday Exam by Nick Pollotta, Wildside Press (2001). ISBN 978-1587154676
- Bureau 13: Full Moonster by Nick Pollotta, Wildside Press (2002). ISBN 978-1587157585
- Bureau 13: Damned Nation by Nick Pollotta, Wildside Press (2005). ISBN 978-0809550975 Set in the American civil war.

=== Other media ===
- A secret organization named "Bureau 13" is mentioned in the Babylon 5 episode "Spider in the Web". However, when J. Michael Straczynski heard about the game, while Richard Tucholka offered Straczynski use of the trademark the studio said no.

=== Video game ===
GameTek published a video game based on the role-playing game in February 1995.

== See also ==
- Bureau of Paranormal Research and Defense
- Special Unit 2
- Delta Green
