= Star Charts =

Star Charts is a 1986 role-playing game supplement published by Tri Tac Games for FTL:2448.

== Contents ==
Star Charts is a supplement in which a sourcebook provides data on more than 2,000 stars within 100 light-years of the Sun. While it does not include actual maps, it offers guidance on how to create star charts for any specific zone inside the described area.

== Publication history ==
Star Charts was written by Richard Tucholka and Lloyd Stilwell and published by Tri-Tac Inc. in 1986 as a 32-page book.
