= Liberation at Riverton =

Role-playing game supplement

- Cover art by H.N. Voss
- Author: Bill Worzel; H.N. Voss
- Illustrator: H.N. Voss
- Genre: Post-apocalyptic
- Publisher: Timeline
- Publication date: 1982
- Followed by: Damocles

Liberation at Riverton is an adventure published by Timeline in 1982 for the post-apocalyptic role-playing game The Morrow Project.

== Contents ==
A Project Morrow team awakens from cryogenic sleep 150 years after a nuclear holocaust, but with no orders. When they emerge from their Bolthole, they find a heavily armed dictator in charge of the entire district. With only a bare amount of equipment, the team must try to liberate the impoverished inhabitants.

The book also updates the rules on combat damage caused by armored vehicles, and includes the floorplan of a typical Bolthole — the cryogenic hideout that holds sleeping Project Morrow teams; background details on the Project and the players' gear that were not included in the original rulebook; and detailed interior views of the players' vehicle.

== Publication history ==
Timeline published the post-apocalyptic role-playing game The Morrow Project in 1980, and between 1982 and 2013, published eleven adventures, the first in 1982 being Liberation at Riverton, a 44-page book written by Bill Worzel and H.N. Voss, with artwork by Voss.

== Reception ==
In Issue 56 of The Space Gamer, William A. Barton commented "Liberation at Riverton is a worthy effort and is, one hopes, only the first in a strong of scenarios for use with TMP to alleviate the problems of those of us who don't have the time to create our own."

In Issue 2 of the British game magazine Imagine, Chris Baylis was not impressed, noting "There is not an abundance of information concerning this scenario; that which is available to the players is given to them in an unconvincing way."

In Issue 42 of the British game magazine White Dwarf (June 1983), Phil Masters commented, "the players need luck, judgement, and decisiveness, and if they fail, the party will probably get wiped out. How you feel about this is a matter of taste ..." Master concluded by giving the adventure a rating of 6 out of 10.

In Issue 46 of Different Worlds, Joseph Benedetto called the new rules for armored vehicle damage "much more realistic then the earlier 'You're hit: two dead, one injured, car stops' system found in the rulebook." Benedetto also thought "The various plans and charts are a very good aid to playing the game." Benedetto concluded, "this is a very good module for beginners, and is extremely high in 'shoot-'em-up' potential."
