= Prime Base (The Morrow Project) =

Prime Base is a 1987 role-playing game adventure published by Timeline Ltd. for The Morrow Project.

== Plot summary ==
Prime Base is an adventure in which the setting is Prime Base, the Morrow Project's primary facility, and the scenario centers on reaching a fully stocked installation that holds everything needed to begin rebuilding America—if the player characters can access it.

== Publication history ==
Prime Base was written by H. N. Voss and W. P. Worzel and published by Timeline Ltd. in 1987 as a 64-page book.

Shannon Appelcline notes that "PF-008: Prime Base (1987) closed off the game's original run by detailing the destination that all Morrow players had been seeking."
