= Personal Basic Loads =

Tabletop role-playing game supplement

Personal Basic Loads is a 1980 role-playing game supplement published by Timeline for The Morrow Project.

== Contents ==
Personal Basic Loads is a play aid that contains 66 three-hole punched sheets, consisting of three sheets each for the 22 basic sets of equipment, weapons, and ammunition for player characters serving as part of a team.

== Reception ==
William A. Barton reviewed Personal Basic Loads in The Space Gamer No. 48. Barton commented that "A set of Personal Basic Loads is a must for a Morrow GM if he wants to run his campaign in the most orderly method possible."
