= Haunts =

Haunts may refer to:

- Haunts (band), a British rock band
- Haunts (album), a 2007 album by Bark Bark Bark
- "Haunts" (The Shield), a 2007 episode of the TV series The Shield
- Haunts (film), a 1976 American horror film
- Haunts (Stalking the Night Fantastic), a 1984 tabletop game book for Stalking the Night Fantastic
- Haunts (Wraith: The Oblivion), a 1994 tabletop game book for Wraith: The Oblivion

== See also ==
- Haunt (disambiguation)
- Haunted (disambiguation)
- Haunter (disambiguation)
- The Haunting (disambiguation)
