= Damocles (disambiguation) =

Damocles was a legendary Greek figure.

Damocles may also refer to:

- 5335 Damocles, an asteroid
- Damocles (video game), a 1990 science fiction videogame
- Damocles (targeting pod), a French laser designator and forward looking infrared pod used on military aircraft
- "Damocles" (song), a 2025 song by Sleep Token
- Damocles (The Morrow Project), a 1982 adventure for the role-playing game The Morrow Project
- Damocles (genus), a genus of prehistoric, shark-like cartilaginous fish

== See also ==
- Oroxylum indicum, a flowering plant also known as the "tree of Damocles"
- Sword of Damocles (disambiguation)
