= Haunts (Stalking the Night Fantastic) =

Haunts is a 1984 role-playing game adventure published by Tri Tac Games for Stalking the Night Fantastic.

== Plot summary ==
Haunts is an adventure in which seven short adventure scenarios are included along with new rules.

== Publication history ==
Haunts was written by Richard Tucholka and published by Tri Tac Inc. in 1984 as a 32-page book.
