= Haunting =

The Haunting or Haunting may refer to:

== Film and television ==
- The Haunting (1963 film), a horror film directed by Robert Wise
- The Haunting (1999 film), a loose remake of the 1963 film, directed by Jan de Bont
- The Haunting (2009 film), a Spanish film by Elio Quiroga
- A Haunting, a 2002–2007 and 2012–present American paranormal drama anthology TV series
- The Haunting (TV series), a 2018–2020 American anthology series
- "The Haunting" (Back at the Barnyard), a 2008 TV episode
- "Haunting" (The Watcher), a 2022 TV episode

== Literature ==
- The Haunting (Mahy novel), a 1982 children's book by Margaret Mahy
- The Haunting (Nixon novel), a 1998 young adult's novel by Joan Lowery Nixon

== Music ==
- The Haunting (Clandestine album) or the title song, 1997
- The Haunting (Theatre of Ice album), 1982
- "Haunting" / "Workout", a single by Andy C, 2013
- "The Haunting", a song by Anberlin from Godspeed, 2006
- "The Haunting", a song by Avantasia from Ghostlights, 2016
- "The Haunting", a song by Symphony X from The Damnation Game, 1995
- "The Haunting (Somewhere in Time)", a song by Kamelot from The Black Halo, 2005
- "Haunting", a song by Halsey from Badlands, 2015
- "Haunting", a song by Haste the Day from Dreamer, 2008

== Video games ==
- The Haunting (video game), a 1993 comedy-horror game

== See also ==
- List of haunted paintings
- List of reportedly haunted locations
- Haunt (disambiguation)
- Haunts (disambiguation)
- Haunted (disambiguation)
- Haunter (disambiguation)
