= Dennis Chalker =

US Navy SEAL and author (born 1954)

- Born: July 28, 1954 (age 72); Mantua, Ohio
- Military career
- Allegiance: United States of America
- Branch: United States Army; United States Navy
- Service years: 1971–1975; 1977-1998
- Rank: Command Master Chief Petty Officer
- Nicknames: Denny, Snake
- Other work: CEO of DSC Inc. and Director of Operations for GSGI, author

Dennis Chalker (born July 28, 1954) is a retired Navy SEAL, inventor, and author who has written six books about the United States Navy SEALs.

== Career ==
Chalker began his military service with the U.S. Army, serving in the 82nd Airborne Division from 1972 till 1975. Upon discharge he tried his hand at a few civilian jobs and found them less than challenging. Chalker then joined the United States Navy in 1977. Chalker graduated from Basic Underwater Demolition/SEAL training class 101 in Coronado, Ca. Following SEAL Tactical Training and completion of a six month probationary period, he received the NEC 5326 as a Combatant Swimmer (SEAL), entitled to wear the Special Warfare Insignia. Chalker initially served with SEAL Team ONE and was later hand-selected by Commander Richard Marcinko in 1980 to become a plankowner of the Navy's first dedicated counter-terrorist unit, SEAL Team Six. As a member of SEAL Team Six, he participated in Operation Urgent Fury in the US Invasion of Grenada. His team reached then Governor General Paul Scoon's mansion and held it for an entire day while being attacked by a force of Grenadians and Cubans.

As a SEAL, Chalker saw action in Haiti (recounted in his book One Perfect Op), El Salvador, and Panama.

When Marcinko was tasked to select members for a new unit to test security at US Naval bases against the threat of terrorism, he once again chose Chalker as one of the founding members in 1985. This unit was called Naval Security Coordination Team, also known as Red Cell. Chalker transitioned back to SEAL Team SIX in 1987 which was renamed as Naval Special Warfare Development Group. His final duty station was as the Command Master Chief at the Naval Special Warfare Center for BUD/S (Basic Underwater Demolition/SEALs) Training in Coronado, California. While serving as Command Master Chief of BUD/S, Chalker was hired as a technical advisor for The Rock, a 1996 Jerry Bruckheimer film. Chalker was also used as an onscreen extra during the movie's swim and dive sequences. This led to a position as Director of Operations with Global Studies Group, Inc. (GSGI), upon his retirement from the US Navy. GSGI is a combination security and training company owned by former US Navy SEAL Harry Humphries that specializes in bringing modified (civilian version) SpecOps tactical skill training to law- enforcement agencies and Hollywood movie productions. Chalker is credited for inventing and developing a tactical rifle and submachine gun single-point sling known as the Chalker Sling while at SEAL Team Six. The Chalker Sling attaches the long gun to the shooter via a harness which enables the operator to quickly transition to a secondary weapon or perform another task while using both hands and keeping the weapon in a close-ready position as the weapon "hangs" from the chest, leaving just enough slack to be able to quickly bring it to firing position with little effort.

Since retiring from the Navy, Chalker has authored six books, three fiction and three non-fiction with Kevin Dockery about life as a Navy SEAL.

== Bibliography ==
=== Non-fiction ===
- Chalker, Dennis C., with Kevin Dockery. The United States Navy SEALs Workout Guide: the Exercise and Fitness Programs Based on the U.S. Navy SEALs and BUD/S Training. 1st ed. New York: William Morrow & Co., 1998. xxii, 183 p. : ill. ; 28 cm. ISBN 0-688-15862-5
- Chalker, Dennis C., with Kevin Dockery. One Perfect Op: an Insider’s Account of the Navy Seal Special Warfare Teams. 1st ed. New York: Morrow, 2002. xiii, 332 p. ; 25 cm. ISBN 0-380-97804-0 (acid-free paper)

=== Fiction ===
- Chalker, Dennis C., with Kevin Dockery. Hell Week: SEALS in Training. New York : Avon Books, 2002. 375 p. ; 18 cm. ISBN 0-06-000148-8
- Chalker, Dennis C., with Kevin Dockery. The Home Team: Undeclared War. New York: Avon Books, 2004. 392 p. ; 18 cm. ISBN 0-06-051726-3
- Chalker, Dennis C., with Kevin Dockery. The Home Team: Hostile Borders. New York: Avon Books, 2005. 362 p. ; 18 cm. ISBN 0-06-051727-1
- Chalker, Dennis C., with Kevin Dockery. Home Team: Weapons Grade. New York: Avon Books, 2006. 373 p. ; ISBN 0-06-051728-X
