= Personal and Vehicular Basic Loads and The Morrow Project Role Playing Expansion =

Tabletop role-playing game supplement

Personal and Vehicular Basic Loads and The Morrow Project Role Playing Expansion is a 1983 role-playing game supplement published by Timeline for The Morrow Project.

== Contents ==
Personal and Vehicular Basic Loads and The Morrow Project Role Playing Expansion is a supplement designed to help determine whether a character has knowledge of something or is able to perform a task, and also contains copies the basic loads for both personnel and vehicles.

== Reception ==
William A. Barton reviewed Morrow Project Role Playing Expansion and Personal and Vehicular Basic Loads in The Space Gamer No. 63. Barton commented that "If you prefer the original Morrow system, or you've already adapted a skill system from another game, you may not find this supplement worth buying. If not, you may wish to look into the TMP RP Expansion – but be ready to cover its gaps yourself."
