= Operation Lonestar =

Operation Lonestar is a 1985 role-playing game adventure published by Timeline Ltd. for The Morrow Project.

== Plot summary ==
Operation Lonestar is an adventure in which a Texas-based war scenario follows the Last Cavalry Unit; the adventure presents new military vehicles, including the M1 tank.

== Publication history ==
Operation Lonestar was written by H. N. Voss and published by Timeline Ltd. in 1985 as a 40-page book.

== Reviews ==
- Different Worlds #46
