= Desert Search =

Desert Search is a 1986 role-playing game adventure published by Timeline Ltd. for The Morrow Project.

== Plot summary ==
Desert Search is an adventure in which a team races through the Nevada desert to locate the long-lost Morrow Project power station before a hostile enemy force reaches it first.

== Publication history ==
Desert Search was written by Joseph Benedetto, Jr. and H. N. Voss and published by Timeline Ltd. in 1986 as a 40-page book.

== Reviews ==
- Different Worlds #46
