= The Ruins of Chicago =

1983 Post-apocalyptic tabletop role-playing supplement

- Cover art by H.N. Voss
- Author: Bill Worzel; H.N. Voss
- Illustrator: H.N. Voss
- Genre: Post-apocalyptic
- Publisher: Timeline
- Publication date: 1983
- Preceded by: Operation Lucifer
- Followed by: The Starnaman Incident

The Ruins of Chicago is an adventure published by Timeline in 1983 for the post-apocalyptic role-playing game The Morrow Project.

== Plot summary ==
The Ruins of Chicago is an adventure set in Chicago 150 years after World War III. Morrow Recon Team G-12C, cryogenically frozen in a Bolthole just outside Chicago, is awakened by an unknown radio source and ordered to cross the old city and reconnoiter a university to see if its computer center can be used to set up an advanced base.

Critics noted that the adventure is difficult and deadly.

== Publication history ==
Timeline published the post-apocalyptic role-playing game The Morrow Project in 1980, and between 1981 and 2013, published eleven adventures, as well as several supplements. The fourth adventure, The Ruins of Chicago, is a book written by Bill Worzel, with artwork by H.N. Voss. It was published in 1983.

== Reception ==
In Issue 34 of Different Worlds, Barron E. Barnett commented "Once again Timeline has composed a role-playing game scenario that will be looked upon by others as a standard of supplemental game documentation. The Ruins of Chicago is one of the best scenarios a project director could possibly invest in for his own enjoyment as well as that of his players."

In Issue 20 of the British game magazine Imagine, Chris Baylis noted "As the first 'city' module, R-004 gives players the chance to learn urban and guerilla warfare, but the emphasis is on the negotiations and interaction with the various city factions. The scenario gives good ground for an experienced team of proven ability, but will be a very hard task for novices."

In Issue 72 of The Space Gamer, William A. Barton warned that the game was not suitable for beginners, commenting "for a team of veteran TMP players, The Ruins of Chicago can prove a most challenging and worthwhile roleplaying experience."

In Issue 46 of Different Worlds, Joseph Benedetto warned "Players have to be fast on their feet if they hope to accomplish this mission! ... It is extremely dangerous, and fully merits the warning on its cover: 'An Extraordinarily Deadly Scenario for the Morrow Project.' Definitely not for beginners!"
