= The Morrow Project Vehicular Blueprints =

Tabletop role-playing game supplement

The Morrow Project Vehicular Blueprints is a 1980 role-playing game supplement published for The Morrow Project by Timeline.

== Contents ==
The Morrow Project Vehicular Blueprints is a set of 14 exterior blueprint views of the basic vehicles for the game.

== Reception ==
William A. Barton reviewed The Morrow Project Vehicular Blueprints in The Space Gamer No. 45. Barton commented that "Overall, the Morrow Project Vehicular Blueprints are a well-conceived play-aid to an excellent SF role-playing system."
