= Kevin Dockery (author) =

American military author and game designer

Kevin Dockery is an American fiction and nonfiction author and military historian. He is best known for his work detailing the history and weapons of the Navy SEALs. He served in the US Army on the President's Guard, and as an armorer. Since retiring from the Army, he has worked as a curator for the SEAL Museum in Fort Pierce, Florida, a historian, a game designer and as a lecturer. He has written 37 books, appeared in a number of television documentaries and served as technical advisor for several motion pictures.

He has written with or for several well-known figures, including Bill Fawcett, David Drake, Jesse Ventura, Harry Humphries, Dennis Chalker and several other SEALs.

== Biography ==
Kevin Dockery was born October, 1954 in Highland Park, Michigan. He served in the U.S. Army from 1972 through 1975 as the Unit Armorer for Company A, 1st Battalion, 3rd Infantry Regiment, The Old Guard, a ceremonial and guard unit assigned to the White House in Washington DC. Company A was the Presidents Guard for the 1976 Bicentennial. The Guard performed as a recreation of George Washington's Guard down to the period uniforms and weapons. Dockery was a Selected Marksman for the unit. His duties also included caring for all of the unit's weapons, both modern and antique, including 77 Brown Bess flintlock muskets, swords, spontoons (spears) and other arms.

After leaving the army, Dockery returned to Michigan where he received a BA degree in Communications from Oakland University in 1980 with a concentration on broadcast journalism. While going to school, Dockery joined the Michigan National Guard, Company A, 225th Infantry. Rising to the rank of platoon sergeant, he served as an 81mm M29A1 mortar team leader, a weapons squad leader (antitank), and an infantry squad leader. He left the service in 1984.

Dockery fleshed out the military portion of the post-apocalyptic role-playing game The Morrow Project (1980). He also wrote military reference works for various other RPGs, such as The Armory Volume 1.

His books include Navy Seals: The Complete History, Stalkers and Shooters: A History of Snipers and Weapons of the Navy Seals. He has appeared in six episodes of Weaponology, Somali Pirate Takedown: The Real Story, and two episodes of Ground War.

Dockery lives in Ohio where he divides his time between writing, raising big dogs, and his hobbies which include scuba diving, blacksmithing, fencing, gunsmithing, and knife and sword making.

== Selected works ==
- Compendium of modern firearms: a compendium of the weapons and equipment used by the world's counterterrorist units. Talsorian Games. 1991. ISBN 0-937279-23-4. OCLC 39719012.
- SEALs in action. Avon Books. 1991. ISBN 0-380-75886-5. OCLC 22996651.
- Navy SEALs: a history of the early years. Berkley. 2001. ISBN 0-425-17825-0. OCLC 47018518.
- Navy SEALs: a history part II: the Vietnam years. Berkley Books. 2002. ISBN 0-425-18348-3. OCLC 48449554.
- Weapons of the Navy SEALs. Berkley Books. 2004. ISBN 0-425-19834-0.
- Stalkers and shooters: a history of snipers. Berkley Caliber. 2006. ISBN 0-425-21002-2. OCLC 70839806.
- Operation Thunderhead: The True Story of Vietnam's Final POW Rescue Mission--and the last Navy Seal Killed in Country. Berkley Trade. 2009. ISBN 978-0-425-23000-8.
