= Security Cover Sheets =

Security Cover Sheets is a 1982 role-playing game supplement published by Timeline Ltd. for The Morrow Project.

== Contents ==
GA-6: Morrow Industries Security Cover Sheets is a supplement in which a gamemaster's aid consists of Confidential, Secret, and Top Secret forms designed to enhance realism in player handouts.

== Publication history ==
Security Cover Sheets was published by Timeline Ltd. in 1981 as three sheets and a cover sheet.
