= Haunted =

Haunted or The Haunted may refer to:

== Books ==
- Haunted (Armstrong novel), by Kelley Armstrong, 2005
- Haunted (Cabot novel), by Meg Cabot, 2004
- Haunted (Palahniuk novel), by Chuck Palahniuk, 2005
- Haunted (Angel novel), a 2002 novel based on the television series Angel
- Haunted (The Hardy Boys), a 2008 novel featuring The Hardy Boys in the Undercover Brothers series
- Haunted, a 1988 novel by James Herbert
- Haunted, a 1990 novel in the Fear Street series by R.L. Stine
- Haunted: Tales of the Grotesque, a 1994 short-story collection by Joyce Carol Oates

== Comics ==
- Haunted (Buffy comic), an anthology of comics based on the television series Buffy the Vampire Slayer
- Haunted (comics), a horror-suspense anthology comic book series

== Film ==
- Haunted (1977 film), an American film starring Aldo Ray
- The Haunted (1991 film), an American made-for-TV film directed by Robert Mandel
- Haunted (1995 film), a UK film starring Aidan Quinn and Kate Beckinsale
- Haunted (2007 film), a Turkish film directed by Alper Mestçi
- Haunted – 3D, a 2011 Hindi film directed by Vikram Bhatt
- Haunted (2026 film), a Canadian fantasy comedy

== Television ==
- Haunted (British TV series), a British supernatural drama series that ran from 1967 to 1968
- Haunted (2002 TV series), an American supernatural drama series
- Haunted (2018 TV series), an American paranormal docudrama series
- The Haunted (American TV series), a 2009 American paranormal docudrama series
- The Haunted (Philippine TV series), a 2019 Philippine horror drama series

=== Episodes ===
- "Haunted" (Arrow)
- "Haunted" (Criminal Minds)
- "Haunted" (Dead Like Me)
- "Haunted" (Dollhouse)
- "Haunted" (Highlander)
- "Haunted" (Law & Order: Special Victims Unit)
- "Haunted" (Sanctuary)
- "Haunted" (Tru Calling)
- "Haunted" (The Vampire Diaries)

== Theatre ==
- Haunted, a 2009 play by Jon Claydon and Tim Lawler that starred Jessie Wallace
- Haunted, a 2009 play by Edna O'Brien

== Music ==
=== Performers ===
- The Haunted (Swedish band), a Swedish metal band
- The Haunted (Canadian band), a 1960s Canadian garage rock band
- Haunted (band), an Italian metal band

=== Albums ===
- Haunted (Janita album), or the title song, 2010
- Haunted (Late Night Alumni album), 2011
- Haunted (Poe album), or the title song, 2000
- Haunted (Six Feet Under album), or the title song, 1995
- The Haunted (album), by the Swedish band The Haunted, 1998
- Haunted (EP), by Lalaine, or the title song, 2004

=== Songs ===
- "Haunted" (Beyoncé song), 2013
- "Haunted" (Human Nature song), 2004; covered by Room 2012, 2007
- "Haunted" (Kane Brown and Jelly Roll song), 2025
- "Haunted" (Laura Les song), 2021
- "Haunted" (The Pogues song), 1986
- "Haunted" (Taylor Swift song), 2010
- "Haunted", by Annihilator from Metal, 2007
- "Haunted", by Charlotte Martin from On Your Shore, 2004
- "Haunted", by Deep Purple from Bananas, 2003
- "Haunted", by Diamante, 2018
- "Haunted", by Disturbed from Indestructible, 2008
- "Haunted", by Dusty Springfield from A Brand New Me, 1992 reissue
- "Haunted", by Evanescence from Fallen, 2003
- "Haunted", by Gary Numan from Jagged, 2006
- "Haunted", by Go West from Go West, 1985
- "Haunted", by Jewel from 0304, 2003
- "Haunted", by Kelly Clarkson from My December, 2007
- "Haunted", by Laufey from Bewitched, 2023
- "Haunted", by the Moody Blues from Strange Times, 1999
- "Haunted", by Paul van Dyk from In Between, 2007
- "Haunted", by Rihanna from Good Girl Gone Bad, 2007
- "Haunted", by the Smashing Pumpkins from Cyr, 2020
- "Haunted", by Stream of Passion from Embrace the Storm, 2005
- "Haunted", by Type O Negative from October Rust, 1996
- "The Haunted", by Memphis May Fire from The Hollow, 2011
- "The Haunted", by Trail of Tears from Profoundemonium, 2000

== Video games ==
- Haunted, a video game from Deck13

== See also ==
- Haunt (disambiguation)
- Haunted attraction
- Haunted house, a building believed to be a centre for supernatural occurrences
  - Haunted house (disambiguation)
- List of haunted paintings, works of art described as being haunted or cursed
- List of reportedly haunted locations, sites of reported ghostly activity
- Haunts (disambiguation)
- Haunter (disambiguation)
- The Haunting (disambiguation)
- Ghostlore
