= Project Director's Screen =

Project Director's Screen is a 1984 role-playing game supplement published by Timeline Ltd. for The Morrow Project.

== Contents ==
GA-1: Game Master's Sheild and Reference Tables / Project Director's Screen is a supplement in which a gamemaster's screen features three quick-reference sheets summarizing weapon statistics.

== Publication history ==
Project Director's Screen was published by Timeline Ltd. in 1983 as a cardboard screen with three cardstock sheets.
