= The Morrow Project Gamemaster's Shield and Reference Tables =

Tabletop role-playing game supplement

The Morrow Project Gamemaster's Shield and Reference Tables is a 1981 role-playing game supplement published for The Morrow Project by Timeline.

== Contents ==
The Morrow Project Gamemaster's Shield and Reference Tables is a gamemaster's shield with reference pages that have been three-hole punched.

Game Master's Shield & Reference Tables is a GM's screen, later revised and re-released as the Project Director's Shield.

== Publication history ==
Game Master's Shield & Reference Tables was published by Timeline Ltd. in 1980 as two cardstock sheets. A second edition was published in 1981 as a cardstock screen, three cardstock sheets, and a cover sheet.

== Reception ==
William A. Barton reviewed The Morrow Project Gamemaster's Shield and Reference Tables in The Space Gamer No. 49. Barton commented that "Gamemaster's Shield and Reference Tables succeed admirably in their function - to facilitate play in an excellent role-playing game."
