= The Starnaman Incident =

1983 Post-apocalyptic tabletop role-playing supplement

- Cover art by Craig Starnaman
- Author: Craig Starnaman; H.N. Voss
- Illustrator: Craig Starnaman
- Genre: Post-apocalyptic
- Publisher: Timeline
- Publication date: 1984
- Preceded by: The Ruins of Chicago
- Followed by: Lonestar

The Starnaman Incident is an adventure published by Timeline Ltd. in 1984 for the post-apocalyptic role-playing game The Morrow Project.

== Plot summary ==
In The Morrow Project, teams of volunteers have been cryonically frozen in hidden bunkers called boltholes in order to survive an expected nuclear holocaust, with the intention that they rebuild civilization when they emerge. In The Starnaman Incident, one of these boltholes was discovered before the nuclear war by an organized crime gang, who killed the sleeping Morrow Project volunteers and used the bunker to survive the war. The gang members emerged and used the bolthole's tools, armaments and devices to institute a reign of terror in the area for 15 years.

Another Morrow Project team awakes 150 years later in the town of Starnaman, and finds that the legend of the evil "People of Morrow" has set everyone against them. The team must regain the trust of the locals, and find their way past the automated defenses of a logistics support base, all while dealing with packs of mutant wolves. As reviewer Chris Baylis noted, the adventure features a high amount of combat.

== Publication history ==
Timeline published The Morrow Project in 1980, and between 1981 and 2013, published eleven adventures, as well as several supplements. The fifth adventure, The Starnaman Incident, is a 52-page book written by Craig Starnaman and H.N. Voss and published in 1984. Starnaman and Voss also provided the interior illustrations and Starnaman created the cover art.

== Reception ==
In Issue 20 of the British game magazine Imagine (November 1984), Chris Baylis reviewed three Morrow Project adventures — Operation Lucifer, The Ruins of Chicago, and The Starnaman Incident — and found that The Starnaman Incident was "the weakest of the three releases, but there is an interesting location designed as a play-aid for future reference."

In Issue 46 of Different Worlds, Joseph Benedetto noted that this adventure "Contains the usual new weapons and gear ... Also, there are detailed maps of Delta Base, a [Morrow Project] re-supply facility full of goodies needed by the Project to rebuild civilization. Benedetto commented, "The module is good for beginners, and is generic enough to be set in almost any campaign with little difficulty." Benedetto warned that this was "A 'let's think' module rather then [sic] a shoot-'em up."
