= Holy Warriors =

- Designers: Bill Hamblin
- Publishers: Timeline Ltd.
- Publication: 1985; 41 years ago
- Genres: Time travel

Holy Warriors is a 1985 role-playing game adventure, written by Bill Hamblin, and published by Timeline Ltd. for their time travel game, Time & Time Again.

== Plot summary ==
Holy Warriors is an adventure in which extensively researched information is provided on the Middle East during the Crusades, divided into sections on geography, history, society, economy, religion, technology, politics, and warfare. The book includes two scenarios: "Blades of the Assassins", which focuses on infiltrating the historical Order of the Assassins, and "Sea of Blood", a naval adventure involving the pirate expedition of Reynald de Chatillon.

Holy Warriors provides a campaign setting focused on the Holy Land at the time of the Crusades (A.D. 1095–1291) and presents two adventure scenarios, one of which involves the historical Order of the Assassins.

== Publication history ==
Holy Warriors was written by Bill Hamblin and published by Timeline Ltd. in 1985 as a 64-page book.

Shannon Appelcline noted that after The Morrow Project, "The '80s run of TimeLine produced one other RPG, Time & Again (1984), designed by Voss and Worzel. It was a 'realistic' time travel RPG that - like The Morrow Project - was considered by some to be too complex. There was one supplement, Holy Warriors (1985), and after that the game disappeared."

== Reception ==
William A. Barton reviewed Holy Warriors for Different Worlds magazine and stated that "Overall I'd recommend Holy Warriors highly to any gamemaster who wants to run a time-travel or any other scenario or campaign set in the Middle East during the Crusades. Even those who don't play Time & Time Again - or any time-travel role-playing game-should find this a very useful package for adventuring during this period of history."

Lawrence Schick said that "The author is a doctor of Arabic history, so you can count on the details to be right."

== Reviews ==
- Papyrus (Issue 5 - 1991)
