= Incursion (game) =

Role-playing game

- First edition cover
- Designers: Richard Tucholka
- Publishers: Tri Tac Games
- Publication: 1992 (1st edition); 2022 (2nd edition)
- Genres: Science fiction
- Systems: Custom

Incursion is a science fiction roleplaying game created by Richard Tucholka and published by Tri Tac Games in 1992.

== Overview ==
The player characters are humans abducted by alien slave traders. Together, with other extraterrestrial slaves, they turn on their captors and kill them during the fight, destroying the vital navigational records. Left with possession of one of the fastest and most powerful spaceships, the Anshani space tug Ardanna Nuu, they do not know how to reach their homeworlds, since they all come from non-spacefaring planets in the backwaters of the galaxy that do not turn up in other spacefarers' logs.

Incursion is technically set in the same universe as Bureau 13: Stalking the Night Fantastic, but places the player characters adrift in a complex society, rife with politics and people after them for their ship.

== Reviews ==
- Review in Shadis #17

== 2022 Player’s Guide ==
In 2022 Tri Tac Games released a new version of Incursion compatible with d100 rules. The 2022 guide includes updated artwork, expanded backgrounds, and other new features expanding on the original guide.
