= Time & Time Again =

Tabletop science fiction role-playing game

- Designers: H.N. Voss; W.P. Worzel
- Publishers: Timeline Ltd.
- Publication: 1984; 42 years ago
- Genres: Time travel

Time & Time Again is a time-travel role-playing game, written by H.N. Voss and W.P. Worzel, and published by Timeline Ltd. in 1984.

== Description ==
Time & Time Again is a time-travel system featuring combat rules that can be used for any historical period. PCs can't change the past; they are employed to protect observing time-travel scholars or track down time travelers who have gone berserk. The emphasis is on interacting with historical societies, not altering them. The game includes character creation, maps, charts, and three sample scenarios.

== Publication history ==
Time & Time Again was designed by H.N. Voss and W.P. Worzel, and published by Timeline Ltd. in 1984 as a boxed set containing a 52-page book and a 48-page book, and three four-page pamphlets.

The campaign setting Holy Warriors was published in 1985.

== Reception ==
William Hamblin reviewed Time & Time Again for Different Worlds magazine and stated that "Time & Time Again also offers the potential to be integrated with other game systems. By means of time travel, a character developed under Time & Time Again rules can make his 'Jump' into the past by means of scenarios for other games. Thus with some adaptation and imagination the same Voltiguer could become imbroiled in espionage in the 1980's, be a pirate in the Caribbean Sea, a samurai in Japan, a detective in Victorian London, or even seek the evil cultists of Cthulhu. Thousands of adventures are waiting to be experienced. All you need is the Time."

William A. Barton reviewed Time and Time Again in Space Gamer No. 76. Barton commented that "if you prefer a lot of background info, relatively simply but realistic mechanics, and straight, 'hard' sf in your time traveling, over less background, more mechanics, and a science-fantasy approach – and you don't mind researching your own scenarios – Time and Time Again is the time-travel RPG for you. If the opposite, stick with Timemaster."

Street Vincent reviewed Time & Time Again for Adventurer magazine and stated that "For [the price], there is a lot of reading material. It is organised, highly technical stuff that requires a lot of dedication on the part of the players and the GM. A historical interest is encouraged in order to play effectively, as Time & Time Again is aimed at those gamers who are sticklers for accuracy. Formulas, charts and tables abound in this fantasy/historical RPG. To be critical, the appearance leaves a lot to be desired; the text is often monotonous to read, the illustrations a bit bland, and the covers do little to enhance the presentation. To be fair, though, this is an inexpensive game system, stripped of unnecessary peripherals. It may just take off in a big way, but the only way it can do so is by reputation and promotion."

In his 1990 book The Complete Guide to Role-Playing Games, game critic Rick Swan called this "An interesting but not wholly successful time travel RPG." Swan thought it was "all quite logical but not much fun, because the game's rigid 'science' eliminates every type of what-if scenario ... thus limiting adventurers to observing past events." Swan also felt the character generation rules were too bland, and the combat rules were too complicated. Swan concluded by giving the game a poor rating of only 2 out of 4, saying, "Players who are turned off by the fantasy elements that invariably crop up in other time-traveling RPGs might enjoy the sober-minded Time and Time Again, but others should look elsewhere (Timelords, for instance, is a better design and much more fun."

== Reviews ==
- Game News #6 (Aug., 1985)
