= Outrage! (game) =

- Game box
- Players: 2–6
- Setup time: 5–10 minutes
- Playing time: 1-3 hours
- Chance: Medium (dice rolling, card drawing, luck)
- Age range: 8 and up
- Skills: Dice rolling, strategy
- tagline: "Steal the Crown Jewels"

Outrage!, "the official Tower of London board game", was first created in 1992 by Imperial Games. Players move about the board, which depicts the Tower of London, and attempt to steal the British Crown Jewels. In reality, the only modern attempt to steal the Jewels was made in 1671 by Thomas Blood and his accomplices, who failed to escape — an earlier attempt in the early fourteenth century was equally unsuccessful — and the game challenges players to "succeed where they failed".

== Rules ==
The game may be played in either a short or long version. In the former, the first player to successfully escape with (not just steal) any one of the Crown Jewels wins; in the latter, whichever player has the greatest total value of crown jewels (as denoted on the board) after they have all been stolen is the winner. The player with St. Edward's Crown wins if there is a tie.

=== Preliminary ===
All cards are shuffled; six Tower Cards are dealt to each player; one coin per player is placed on Devereux Tower; Yeomen Warders and the Crown Jewels are placed as indicated on the board. One flag implement per player is placed in the Queen's House.

=== Movement ===
Players begin at the “Start” square, and must move forward along the wall walk (yellow), not deviating from this path until they reach the Queen's House and are accredited or are instructed to go somewhere by a card.

To be accredited at the Queen's House, a player must either surrender a Tower Pass or roll an odd sum. Accreditation is denoted with a flag inserted into the playing piece, and enables a player to move in any direction as they choose (as opposed to only anti-clockwise on the wall walk).

Doubles in Outrage! are treated analogously to those in Monopoly; they entitle a player an extra roll, but three consecutive doubles will send a player immediately to the Bloody Tower.

Players also have the ability to “Split the Seven” any time this total is rolled. The player who rolled the seven may choose to move the full seven squares, or may move anywhere from one to six squares and then move another player the remaining squares.

=== Stealing the Crown Jewels ===
To steal a crown Jewel, a player must move to the White Tower and land on a square corresponding to a Crown Jewel while possessing at least one burglary tool. The player then reveals their tools, with no duplications. On the following turn, the sum of the values of the tools will be subtracted from twelve, and the player will attempt to roll a sum equal to or greater than the difference, and will continue to roll on turns following if he is not initially successful. More than one player may attempt to steal a jewel at any given time. When a jewel is stolen, all players concurrently attempting to steal that same jewel forfeit their burglary tools to the Tower Card deck. Players may exit the White Tower and return for another attempt as many times as they like, no matter how many jewels they have.

Players with Jewels on their persons cannot pass a Yeoman Warder unless they present a disguise card, or the Warder is not at post. If a Yeoman Warder is summoned to a post a player is on, that player is sent to the Bloody Tower. Once a player has escaped to the Ferry, all jewels are secure for the remainder of the game; that player returns to the start; their tower cards and coin are returned, and they are dealt six new Tower Cards.

=== Attack and combat ===
One player may attack another for jewels and money if they are on the same square. Do not draw a Raven Card. On the same turn, the attacker selects and places face down a combination of weapons (and armor, though this may only be used in defense), and the defender will do the same you can not take play more cards then you have first chosen. Players then reveal their cards, and the one with the highest score of weapons wins. The defender wins if there is a tie. The winner claims all jewels and money for him or herself, and the loser goes to the hospital. If the winner obtains a second coin, the extra coin is sent to the Deveraux Tower. (No player can have multiple coins.) All cards used are sent back to the pack of Tower Cards, from which only the winner draws a number of new cards equal to the number he used in the encounter. If the defender plays a sanctuary card, the defender goes to the Sanctuary, and all cards used by both attacker and defender are sent to the deck of Tower Cards, the players can only hold a maximum of 7 cards.

=== Other rules ===
- Players take a Raven Card anytime they land on a grey square, unless that square has a circle.
- Players may not be attacked, move, or themselves move backwards while in the White Tower.
- When a player goes to The Rack, and prison all Crown Jewels as well as the coin for the ferry and all Tower cards are given up. The player may then play a rack pardon or suffer for three turns.
- Instead of rolling, a player may choose to use their turn to exchange Tower Cards. Unwanted cards are sent to the bottom of the pack, and cards (the same number) are drawn from the top of the pack.
- Players may not move diagonally or move over the same square more than once in a turn.
- Multiple players may occupy a square, but no players may move over or on the grassed areas and the Waterloo Barracks.
- Prisoners are immune to attack and movement by other players.
- If a player suspects another of not surrendering all weapons when told to do so, the accused reveals their hand. If guilty, all the accused's cards are forfeited; if not, the cards of the accuser are forfeited, and the cards that were revealed are replaced with new ones from the deck.
- If a player goes to the Broad Arrow Tower, they must turn in all weapons, including all Sanctuary cards, and Armour cards.
- To escape one must roll an exact count die.

== The Jewels ==
Jewel	# Value
St. Edward's Crown	5
Prince of Wales' Crown	4
Orb	3
Sword	2
Sceptre	1

== Other versions ==
Outrage! is also available in a “Deluxe” version. This set, featuring handcrafted jewels of genuine precious metals and stones, is the most expensive board game in the world at £7995 (approximately $15,000 US). Additionally, Outrage! is available in a travel version.
