= FTL:2448 =

1982 science fiction role-playing game

- Cover of the first edition
- Designers: Richard Tucholka
- Publishers: Tri Tac Games
- Publication: 1982 (1st edition); 1985 (Expanded edition); 1990 (3rd edition)
- Genres: Science fiction
- Systems: Custom

FTL:2448 is a science fiction role playing game published by Tri Tac Games in 1982 in which players use a faster-than-light (FTL) spaceship as a commercial enterprise, doing whatever it takes to buy enough fuel for the next voyage. This could involve trade, espionage, exploration, war or police work.

== Description ==
FTL:2448, as the title suggests, is set in the year 2448 when FTL ships are used. Like several other role-playing games in the same genre such as MegaTraveller, this game focuses on exploration and trade rather than interstellar warfare or alien incursions.

The game uses the same system that Tri Tac developed for Fringeworthy and Bureau 13. Character generation involves random assignation of 22 attributes. Then each player sends their character to various training schools to determine each character's set of skills from a list of over two hundred. These skills are named but not defined, and the rules make it clear that it is up to each gamemaster to adjudicate the exact meaning of the skill and how it affects the character.

There are also rules for space combat, starship design and economics of trade.

The greatly expanded third edition added many new details of designing and constructing space ships, as well as adding long equipment lists, new alien races, and several introductory adventures.

== Publication history ==
Tri Tac Games was founded by Richard Tucholka and Robert Sadler in 1978. One of their first products was the alternate history role-playing game Fringeworthy. Using Fringeworthy's game system, Tucholka designed a new science fiction game, which was published in 1982 as FTL:2448, a 102-page softcover book in a plastic ring binder.

Tri Tac published a somewhat expanded second edition in 1985 as a 165-page book FTL:2448 — Adventure in Deep Space, and then released two supplements the following year: A focus on police work in Cop 2448 by Tucholka and Kreig Branden; and Star Charts by Tucholka and Lloyd Stilwell.

Then in 1990, a greatly expanded 360-page 3rd edition was released, published in two volumes: Book One covers character creation, alien races, combat, equipment, and some scenarios; Book Two includes a planetary generation system, several campaign setups, and more background information on the overall campaign.

Ten years later, the 3rd edition was published as a PDF with a further 100 pages of new material including starship blueprints. In 2001, Tri Tac released additional alien races for the game, FTL:2448 — Lost Races; and Kansas Class Freighter, a set of blueprints for a typical space freighter.

== Reception ==
In the September–October 1983 edition of Space Gamer (No. 65), William A. Barton commented that "FTL, while not treading any new paths, at least makes an admirable effort to cover aspects of play that too many other systems have ignored or made needlessly complex. If nothing else, I'd highly recommend it as a sourcebook for existing [science fiction role-playing games]."

In the January–February 1985 edition of Different Worlds (Issue #38), Michael Doolittle outlined a host of problems with the game rules of the second edition. Doolittle concluded by giving a very poor rating of 1 star out of 4, saying, "Although there are several interesting ideas in FTL:2448, I can only recommend this game if you have the time to spend tinkering with the game system, or you buy game systems looking for things to add to your campaign. Otherwise, pass this one up."

In his 1990 book The Complete Guide to Role-Playing Games, game critic Rick Swan also reviewed the second edition and found it out-of-date, having been outclassed by newer and more professional products such as the role-playing games produced for the Star Trek and Star Wars franchises. Swan didn't like the ambiguity of the skills and also found that "Rules for space battles, starship design and economics are similarly vague." However, he did think there were "thoughtful, inventive sections on stellar law, robotics, and space colonies, and the rules for personal combat strike a nice balance between detail and playability." Swan concluded by giving the game a below-average rating of 2 out of 4, saying "Though much of FTL:2448 could be used as a sourcebook for other science-fiction RPGs, the game itself is outdated and hardly worth the effort."

In the January 1995 issue of Shadis, Dirk Dejong reviewed the third edition, writing, "This reworking has enough new material to almost qualify as a new game." Dejong was ambivalent about the result, writing, "FTL:2448 has the potential of being either the best or the worst of the Tri-Tac line ... it plugs many of the holes the [first edition] had ... [and] is done with wit, style and intelligence, something lacking in too many offerings today ... On the down side, FTL:2448 is by far the largest game Tri Tac has put out." Dejong thought the large amount of extra material took away from the playability of the game, pointing out "The ship construction rules, are simply too complex for the needs of all but the most detail-oriented of gamers. It could take you literally months to design a ship." He also noted "The game has more tables than a college cafeteria." Dejong concluded by warning that "FTL:2448 rides the ragged edge of how close you can get to bogging you down in minutiae ... If you are into hard-edged, realistic sci-fi role playing, not space opera, and enjoy playing rough, tough, real people, not varnished heroes, this could be the game for you."
