= Bureaucrat =

Member of a bureaucracy

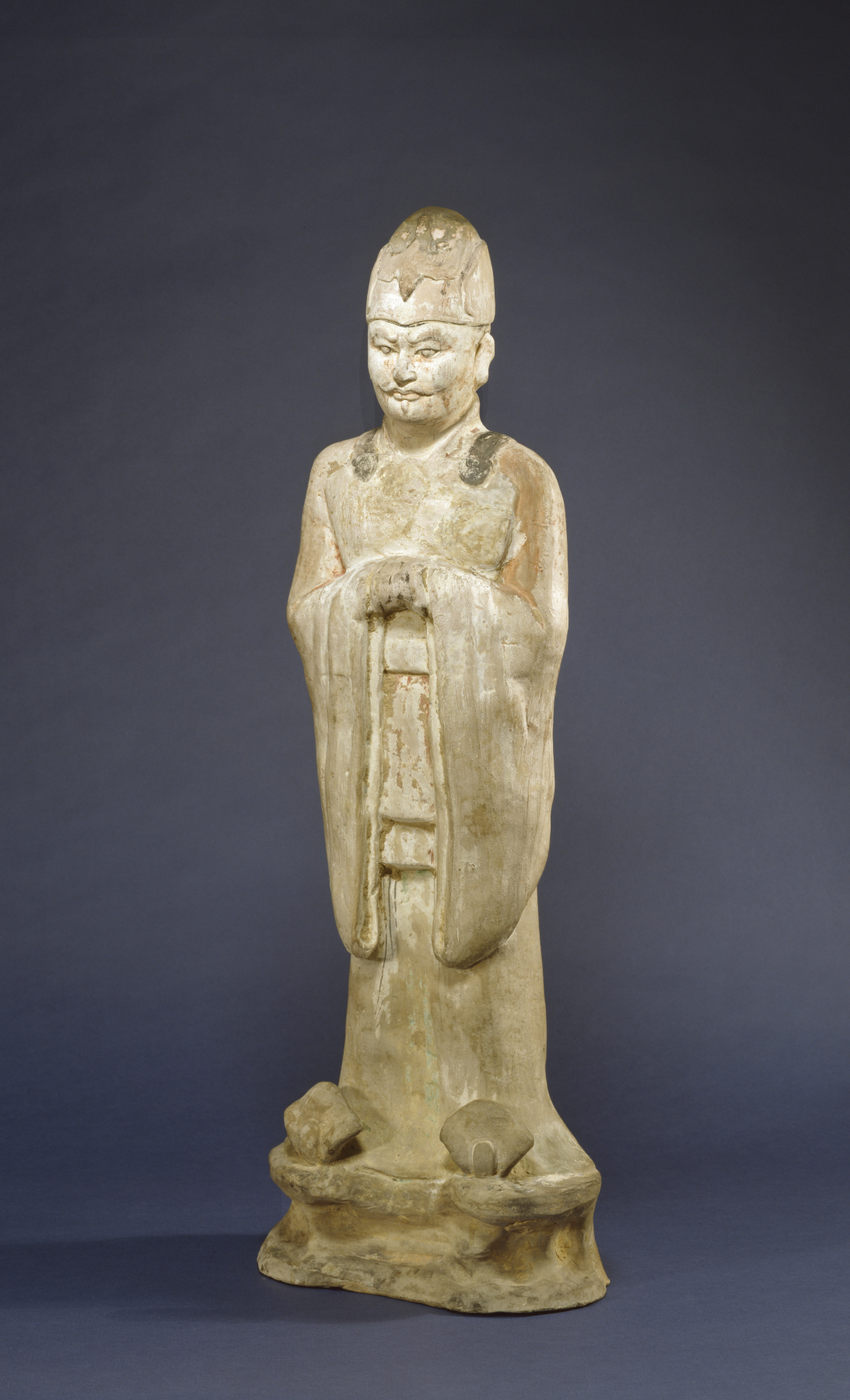
Statue of a Tang dynasty official, 7th–8th century

A bureaucrat is a member of a bureaucracy and can compose the administration of any organization of any size, although the term usually connotes someone within an institution of government.

The term bureaucrat derives from "bureaucracy", which in turn derives from the French "bureaucratie" first known from the 18th century. Bureaucratic work had already been performed for many centuries. The term may also refer to managerial and directorial executives in the corporate sector.

== Role in society ==
Bureaucrats play various roles in modern society, by virtue of holding administrative, functional, and managerial positions in government. They carry out the day-to-day implementation of enacted policies for central government agencies, such as postal services, education and healthcare administration, and various regulatory bodies.

== Types of bureaucrat ==
Various categories of bureaucrats may characterize the system, nationality, and time they come from.

=== Classical ===
A classical definition of a bureaucrat is someone who starts at a low level of public work and does not have to express opinions of their own in their professional capacities. Such bureaucrats follow policy guidelines and rise to increasingly higher ranks within a bureaucratic system. Tax collectors, government accountants, police officers, fire fighters, and military personnel exemplify classical bureaucrats.

=== American ===
American bureaucrats differ from some other types because they operate within a republican form of government, and the political culture traditionally seeks to limit their power.

=== Chinese ===
So-called "Mandarin bureaucrats" filled important official roles in Chinese administration from 605 to 1905 CE. The Zhou dynasty of c. 1046 to 256 BCE provides the earliest records of Chinese bureaucrats. In the 3rd century CE a 9-rank system developed, each rank having more power than the lower rank. This type of bureaucrat operated until the Qing dynasty of 1636 to 1912. After 1905, the Mandarins were replaced by modern civil servants.

=== European ===
Bureaucrats in Europe are sometimes called "Mandarins", the term stemming from the Chinese word for a government employee. Bureaucracy did not catch on in Europe very much due to the many different governments in the region, and constant change and advances, and relative freedom of the upper class. Following the translation of Confucian texts during the Enlightenment, the concept of a meritocracy reached intellectuals in the West, who saw it as an alternative to the traditional ancien régime administrations in Europe. Voltaire (1694-1778) and François Quesnay (1694-1774) wrote favourably of the idea, with Voltaire claiming that the Chinese had "perfected moral science" and Quesnay advocating an economic and political system modeled after that of the Chinese.

The implementation of His Majesty's Civil Service as a systematic, meritocratic civil service bureaucracy in 1870 followed the Northcote–Trevelyan Report of 1854 which was influenced by the ancient Chinese imperial examination. This system was modeled on the imperial examinations system and bureaucracy of China based on the suggestions of Northcote–Trevelyan Report. Thomas Taylor Meadows, Britain's consul in Guangzhou, China argued in his Desultory Notes on the Government and People of China, published in 1847, that "the long duration of the Chinese empire is solely and altogether owing to the good government which consists in the advancement of men of talent and merit only", and that the British must reform their civil service by making the institution meritocratic.

In 1958, though, after the formation of the European Economic Community the job of the bureaucrats of Europe became extremely important to help organize and govern such a large and diverse community. In 1961 journalist Richard Mayne coined the term "Eurocrat". A Eurocrat is a bureaucrat of the European Union.

==== Prussian ====
The civil service of Prussia, as developed under Frederick William I (r. 1640–1688) and Frederick the Great (r. 1740–1786), acquired an enviable reputation for efficiency and consistency.

==== Russian ====
Tsarist Russia (1547 to 1917) developed from Byzantine, Mongol and German models a Tsarist bureaucracy; it had a reputation for inefficiency and corruption. After 1917, Soviet Russia faced the problem of governing a very large country with a largely hostile inherited bureaucracy. The Bolsheviks quickly promoted their own loyal party-members to supervise and replace tsarist officials, but many issues of corruption and rampant officialdom persisted among the apparatchiki.

=== Modern ===
The digital age and the Internet have revolutionized bureaucracy, and the modern bureaucrat has a different skill-set than before. Paper forms and communications that had to be physically written on, moved, or copied are increasingly replaced by technologies such as email and HTML forms, which allow data to be collected, duplicated,or transferred anywhere in the world in seconds. Also, the Internet lowers the corruption-levels of some bureaucratic entities such as police forces due to social media and pro–am journalism.

== Attributes of bureaucrats ==
German sociologist Max Weber defined a bureaucratic official as the following:

- They are personally free and appointed to their position on the basis of conduct.
- They exercise the authority delegated to them in accordance with impersonal rules, and their loyalty is enlisted on behalf of the faithful execution of their official duties.
- Their appointment and job placement are dependent upon their technical qualifications.
- Their administrative work is a full-time occupation.
- Their work is rewarded by a regular salary and prospects of advancement in a lifetime career.
- They must exercise their judgment and their skills, but their duty is to place these at the service of a higher authority. Ultimately they are responsible only for the impartial execution of assigned tasks and must sacrifice their personal judgment if it runs counter to their official duties.
- Bureaucratic control is the use of rules, regulations, and formal authority to guide performance. It includes such things as budgets, statistical reports, and performance appraisals to regulate behavior and results.

As an academic, Woodrow Wilson, later a US president, professed in his 1887 article The Study of Administration:

But to fear the creation of a domineering, illiberal officialism as a result of the studies I am here proposing is to miss altogether the principle upon which I wish most to insist. That principle is, that administration in the United States must be at all points sensitive to public opinion. A body of thoroughly trained officials serving during good behavior we must have in any case: that is a plain business necessity. But the apprehension that such a body will be anything un-American clears away the moment it is asked. What is to constitute good behavior? For that question obviously carries its own answer on its face. Steady, hearty allegiance to the policy of the government they serve will constitute good behavior. That policy will have no taint of officialism about it. It will not be the creation of permanent officials, but of statesmen whose responsibility to public opinion will be direct and inevitable. Bureaucracy can exist only where the whole service of the state is removed from the common political life of the people, its chiefs as well as its rank and file. Its motives, its objects, its policy, its standards, must be bureaucratic. It would be difficult to point out any examples of impudent exclusiveness and arbitrariness on the part of officials doing service under a chief of department who really served the people, as all our chiefs of departments must be made to do. It would be easy, on the other hand, to adduce other instances like that of the influence of Stein in Prussia, where the leadership of one statesman imbued with true public spirit transformed arrogant and perfunctory bureaux into public-spirited instruments of just government.

== See also ==
- Nomenklatura
- Salaryman
- The Man from U.N.C.L.E.
