= Sword of Damocles (disambiguation) =

The Sword of Damocles is a symbolic sword from the Greek parable about the fictional courtier Damocles.

Sword of Damocles may also refer to:

== Music ==
- "Sword of Damocles" (song), by Rufus Wainwright, 2018
- "The Sword of Damocles", a song from the 1973 musical The Rocky Horror Show
- "Sword of Damocles Externally", a song by Lou Reed from the 1992 album Magic and Loss
- "Sword of Damocles", a song from the 2014 Judas Priest album Redeemer of Souls

== Film and television ==
- The Sword of Damocles (film), a 1920 British silent film directed by George Ridgwell
- Sword of Damocles, a super weapon in the 1996 movie Escape from L.A.
- "Sword of Damocles" marking each of the kings in the Japanese TV series K
- "Sword of Damocles", the ninth episode of Survivor 45.

== Other ==
- The Sword of Damocles (virtual reality), the first virtual reality system
- The Sword of Damocles: A Story of New York Life, a 1881 book by Anna Katharine Green

== See also ==
- Damocles (disambiguation)
