= Haunt =

Haunt is a synonym for ghost.

Haunt may also refer to:

== Film ==
- Haunt (2013 film), an American supernatural horror film
- Haunt (2019 film), an American slasher film

== Music ==
- Haunt (band), a heavy metal band from Fresno, California
- Haunt (EP), a 2013 EP by Bastille
- "Haunt", a song by Banks from her album The Altar
- "Haunting", a song by Halsey from Badlands

== Video games ==
- HAUNT, a 1979 computer game
- Haunt (video game), a 2012 video game

== Other uses ==
- Haunt (comics), a comic book character and series

== See also ==
- Halloween Haunt (disambiguation)
- Haunts (disambiguation)
- Haunted (disambiguation)
- Haunter (disambiguation)
- The Haunting (disambiguation)
