= Battle Masters =

1992 board game by Milton Bradley and Games Workshop

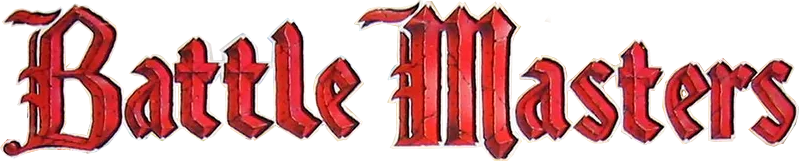

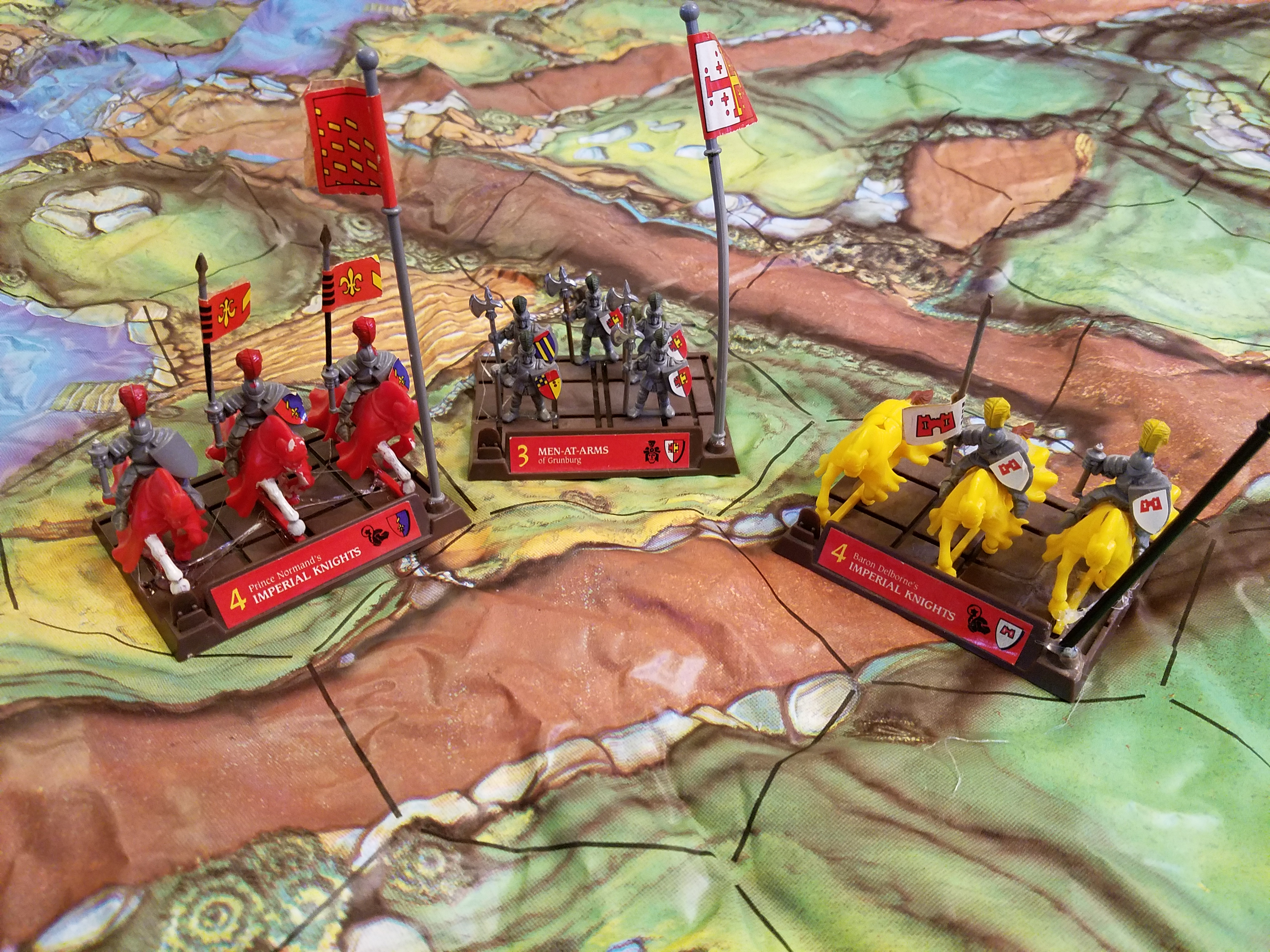
- Imperial Knights and Men-At-Arms
- Other names: Die Claymore Saga
- Designers: Stephen Baker
- Illustrators: Chris Baker
- Publishers: Milton Bradley; Games Workshop
- Publication: 1992; 34 years ago
- Years active: 1992–?
- Genres: Board game
- Languages: English
- Players: 2
- Playing time: 60'
- Age range: 9+

Battle Masters is a miniature wargame by Milton Bradley, made in collaboration with Games Workshop in 1992. It is thematically similar to Warhammer Fantasy Battle, but with much simpler game mechanics. Like other Milton Bradley/Games Workshop partnership board games HeroQuest and Space Crusade, Battle Masters was designed by Stephen Baker, who later went on to design the popular game Heroscape.

In Germany it is called Die Claymore-Saga, in France Seigneurs de guerre, and in the Netherlands Ridderstrijd.

== Gameplay ==
Battle Masters simulates a battle between factions from the Warhammer Fantasy setting: on one side the forces of good, the human Empire; and against them the evil forces of Chaos, featuring a combination of units from Warhammer's Chaos Army and Orcs/Goblins Army.

The game is played on a large 54 by 60 inch vinyl battle mat, superimposed with large hexes. Over 100 unpainted plastic miniatures are included. Instead of individual bases, Battle Masters units are mounted on large unit bases of typically five infantry or three cavalry miniatures.

Players array their armies at opposite ends of the battle mat, or according to one of the pre-set scenarios. Turn order is determined by drawing from a deck of 59 Battle Cards, which determines which units may move on this turn. The same deck contains cards for both armies, meaning the same player may take multiple turns in a row if cards for their units appear sequentially.

When it moves, each unit may move one square and then attack an adjacent opponent (aside from ranged units, which can only attack or move). The attacker and defender each roll a number of dice equal to their Combat Value. The game uses the same type of special dice as HeroQuest, each having three skulls, two blank sides, and one shield. Each skull rolled by the attacker deals one damage to the enemy, and each shield rolled by the defender reduces the damage by one. A unit is eliminated when it accumulates 3 damage.

Each army contains a notable special unit. The Imperial army has the Mighty Cannon, which can strike at long range and eliminate a unit in one hit, but is unreliable and may even destroy itself or hit allies in the cannon's path. The Chaos army has an Ogre Champion which can move three square and attack three times; however, the order in which it does each is determined randomly.

The goal of the game is to eliminate all of the opponent's units. An optional set of scenarios includes unique rules, and a set of tournament rules allows for a campaign of multiple battles. Units which survive a battle in a campaign gain an Elite Token which grants an additional Combat die.

== Forces ==
Each army is divided into a number of units—14 for the Chaos Army, and 11 for the Imperial Army. Each unit consists of a number of miniatures placed on a single unit base, with sticker decals providing a unique unit name and flag for each one. Relative points values were added in later expansions.

=== Chaos ===
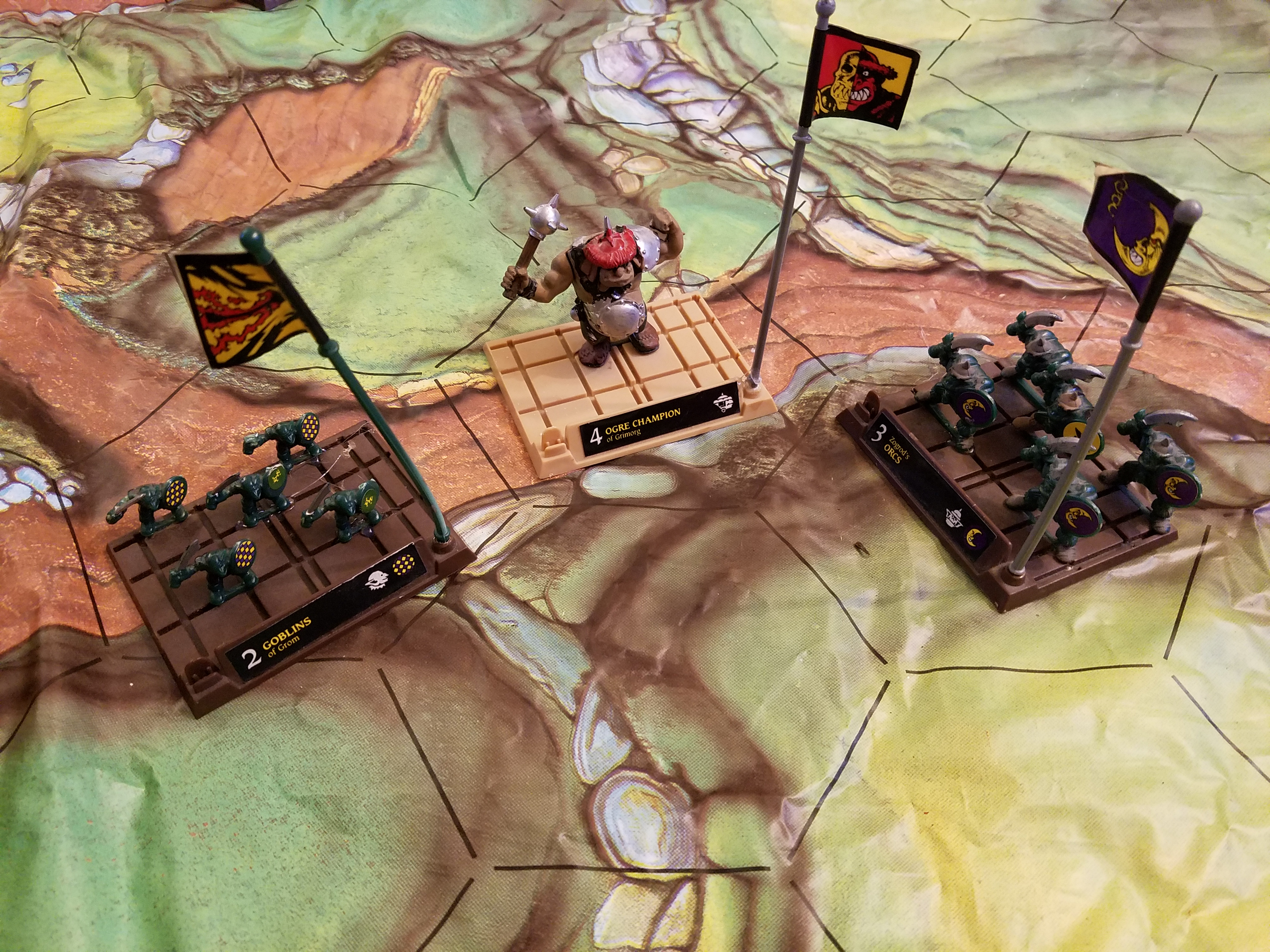
Orcs, Goblins, and the Ogre Champion.

Unit name	Units	Dice	Points	Notes
Champions of Chaos	1	5	9	Cavalry. The Chaos general Gorefist himself. A Charge card allows the Champions of Chaos to attack at one extra die.
Chaos Warriors	2	4	5	
Chaos Bowmen	2	2	4	The only ranged unit in the Chaos army, with a range of 2 squares.
Orcs	2	3	5	
Goblins	2	2	4	
Wolf Riders	2	2	5	Goblin cavalry. They appear frequently in the deck, having 14 cards, allowing them to move quickly. A special card allow them to move two spaces.
Beastmen	2	3	4	Effectively the same as orcs, but appear on one fewer Battle Cards.
Ogre Champion	1	4	8	Special unit. On its turn, a deck of six cards is shuffled, three Move and three Attack. These are played in order. For each point of damage the ogre has taken, it draws one fewer card. At six points of damage, it is destroyed.

=== Imperial Army ===
Unit name	Units	Dice	Points	Notes
Lord Knights	1	5	9	Cavalry. One card allows them to charge for +1 Combat die, and another allows them to charge along with the Imperial Knights.
Imperial Knights	3	4	8	Cavalry. One card allows them to charge along with the Imperial Knights.
Imperial Men-at-Arms	3	3	4	
Imperial Archers	2	3	6	Ranged unit with a range of 2. As a ranged unit, cannot move and fire in the same turn.
Imperial Crossbowman	1	2	5	Ranged unit with range 3.
Mighty Cannon	1	2	10	Special unit. The player lays out a path of Mighty Cannon Tiles to the target. These are then flipped over in order. Each tile may depict the cannonball flying, which allows it to continue going; bouncing, which deals 1 damage to any unit in that hex but allows it to continue; and an explosion, which destroys the unit in that hex and ends the cannon's turn. If the first Cannon tile is an explosion, a misfire occurs: the remaining tiles are shuffled and one is drawn and applied to the Cannon itself.

== Terrain ==
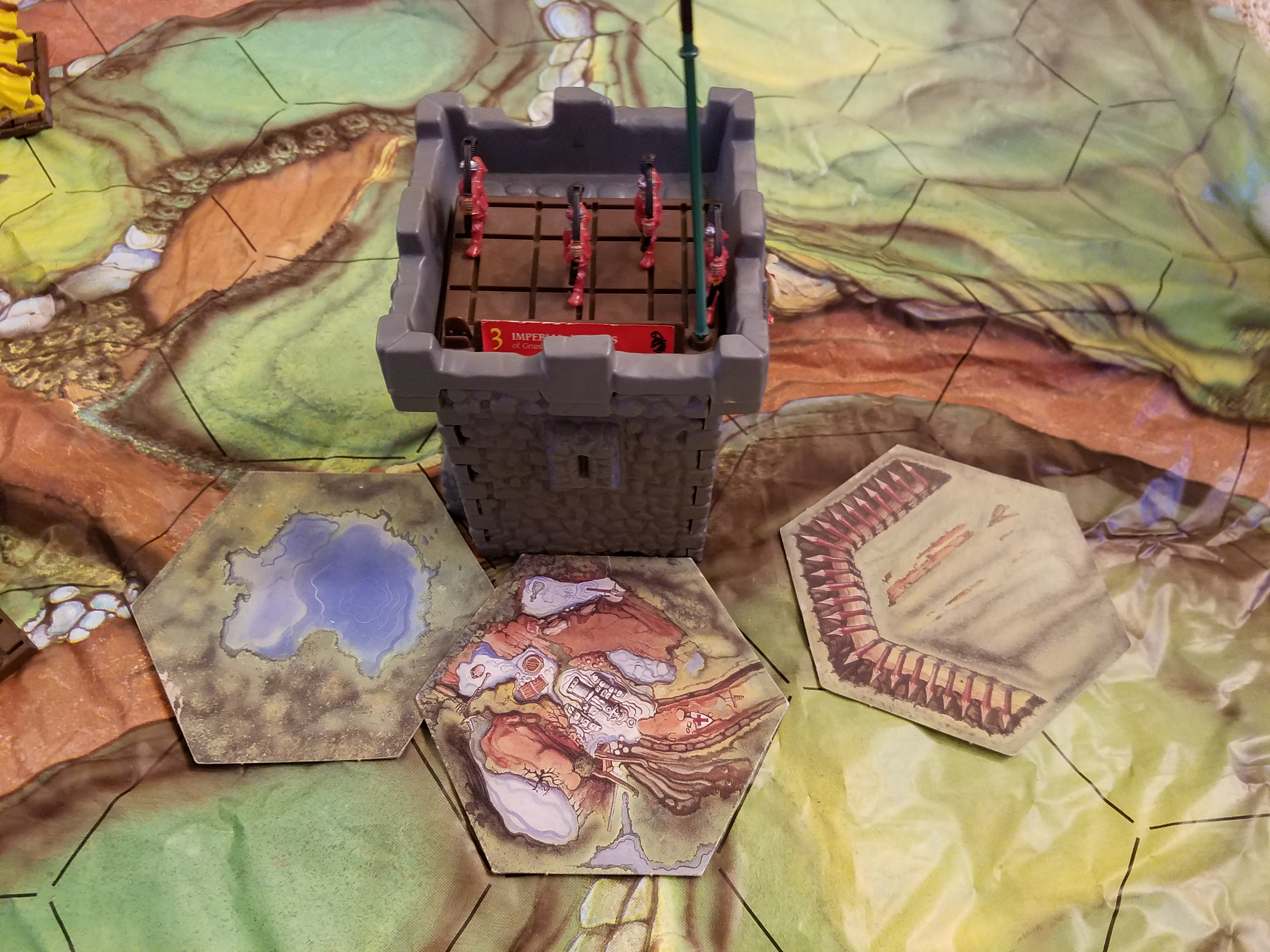
Tower from battlemasters board game

The battle mat contains a river, which cannot be crossed except at fords. Other terrain on the mat has no special game effect.

Several terrain features are added to the board at the start of the round. One player places the terrain features, and the other may decide which side of the battle mat to deploy his units on. The layout in pre-determined campaign maps is instead fixed.

Four hedges are placed on edges between two hexes, and prevent movement across them. Ford tiles may be placed on rivers to allow passage. Marsh tiles prevent movement entirely. Ditch tiles have four fortified sides which prevent movement, and attacks across the fortified sides give the defender +1 Combat die and the attacker −1 Combat die.

A large plastic Tower grants +1 Combat die to any unit inside it, and anyone attacking a unit in the Tower does so at −1 Combat die. Cavalry may not enter the Tower, and it can be destroyed by three Explosion hits from the Mighty Cannon.

== Expansions ==
Two optional expansion packs were released for the game: Imperial Lords and Chaos Warband.

Imperial Lords

- 1 unit of Imperial Lords
- 1 unit of Imperial Knights
- 1 unit of Men-at-Arms
- 2 units of Archers
- 1 unit of Crossbowmen
- 1 Mighty Cannon

Chaos Warband

- 2 units of Chaos Lords
- 4 units of Beastmen
- 2 Ogre Champions

An optional rule assigns a points value to each unit, allowing for players to build armies of equivalent strength. Sample armies are provided, ranging from small to full size. Alternatively, each player can use the base army plus the full expansion set for that army, if both are available.

The Imperial Lord and Chaos Lord units are new units which operate the same as the Lord Knights and Champions of Chaos, respectively, having the same Combat Value and moving on the same Battle Cards. The difference is that each takes only one hit to kill instead of three, and each uses only a single miniature on its base. No new battle cards are added. Both units have a points value of 8, one lower than the unit on which they are based.

== Reception ==
In the December 1992 edition of Dragon (Issue 188), Rick Swan was initially impressed by the contents of the game box: "The dozens of plastic pieces, detailed down to the bolts on the war hammers and scowls on the goblins, are a miniaturist’s dream. The enormous vinyl battle map, with nearly 25 square feet of green fields and azure rivers, may be the biggest playing area ever included in a board game. Throw in a 5” plastic castle, a handful of skull dice, and enough odds and ends to bury the family dog, and it's like a visit from Santa Claus." But Swan was disappointed with every other aspect of the game. He felt the rules were overly simplistic, "as if the designers were afraid that excessive decision-making might cause the players’ heads to explode." And despite all of the different playing pieces, Swan noted that "there’s no meaningful difference between the various units, as just about all of them move and attack the same way." Despite its issues, he pointed out that when he play-tested it with grade-school kids, "everyone one of them adored ... a game big enough to fill the living-room floor." For this reason, Swan raised his rating of the game from poor to an average rating of 3.5 stars out of 6.

In the November–December 1992 edition of Casus Belli (Issue #72), the reviewer noted the large game box packed with colourful, high-quality components, commenting, "Milton Bradley always pushes the limits of the quantity of material present in its games." However, the reviewer found that the rules were far too over-simplified for adults, "but it is true that this is a board game aimed at a fairly young audience." The reviewer concluded, "Before we mourn the fate of poor buyers who were dazzled by the profusion and quality of the material [...] the option exists to upgrade the rules system at your convenience."

It was reviewed in Challenge #74 (1994).

In a 2022 interview, Battle Masters designer Stephen Baker reflected on criticisms that the game lacks strategic depth:

There is more strategy to it than you realize. I once had a US designer tell me it was too luck driven. We played fourteen games in a row swapping sides after each game. I won all fourteen. You have to deploy and play to the strengths of your army and you have to watch what cards have been played.

— "HeroQuest Designer Stephen Baker Reflects On His Epic Creations And Speaks On The Future Of Board Gaming", Toy and Tee Blog (Dec 1, 2022)
