= Hacker (card game) =

Card game launched in 2009

Hacker is a dedicated deck card game for 3–6 players published by Steve Jackson Games (SJG) in 1992.

== History ==
In early 1990, SJG was developing a game called GURPS Cyberpunk. On March 1 of that year, the company was raided by the United States Secret Service as part of a nationwide investigation of data piracy. The agents took computers, printers, hard drives, at least one pocket calculator, over 300 floppy disks, and an entire BBS server. In the court case that followed, the Secret Services justified their actions by calling GURPS Cyberpunk "a handbook for computer crime".

In 1992, SJG made a card game called Hacker based on the Secret Service's beliefs.

In 1993, SJG released the supplement Hacker II: The Dark Side, which added new rules and new cards to the gameplay.

== Gameplay ==
The original game has 110 cards, 172 die-cut cardboard counters, 53 thin cardstock counters, two network ID cards, and a plastic ziplock bag.

The players use cards to construct a computer network, and then roll dice to try and infiltrate the system. Successful entry gains access to new systems, or the ability to crash the system or upgrade the player's equipment. If too many hackers try to infiltrate the same system, it initiates a system housecleaning. A player can also be raided by the FBI or Secret Service.

The first player to gain access to 12 systems wins the game.

== Reception ==
Allen Varney reviewed the game twice for Dragon:

- In the September 1992 edition (Issue 185), Varney found the game didn't have enough player interaction. Varney also didn't like the length of the game, which he felt went on too long because "When a Hacker game player pulls ahead of the pack and becomes 'Net Ninja', the others can bring down the Ninja easily, leading to a draggy war of attrition." Varney concluded, "[Steve] Jackson has made a fair hack at the subject... but he should have debugged a few more times before running it."
- A year later, in the December 1993 edition Varney gave a retrospective thumbs down to the game because of the lack of differentiation between players' roles. "Though individual roles aren’t vital, it helps when a social game gives each player a unique identity — a particular game position, a special power, or just a name. Hacker misses a bet on this count."

== Awards ==
Hacker won the 1992 Origins Award for Best Modern-Day Boardgame.

Hacker II won the 1993 Origins Award for Best Modern-Day Boardgame.

== Reviews ==
- Challenge #67 (December 1992)
- Casus Belli #71 (Sep 1992)
