= The Armory Volume 1 =

Tabletop role-playing game supplement

The Armory Volume 1 is a 1983 role-playing game supplement designed by Kevin Dockery and published by Firebird Limited.

== Contents ==
The Armory Volume 1 is a supplement of game statistics from gunpowder weapons of the 14th-century to modern day weapons for Espionage! and Mercenaries, Spies and Private Eyes.

== Reception ==
William A. Barton reviewed The Armory Volume 1 in Space Gamer No. 72. Barton commented that "The Armory Vol. 1 (second edition) is the best weapons reference book of its type I've seen yet. I recommend it to all gamers who care about the difference between various weapons and how they function in play."

== Reviews ==
- Adventurers Club #5 (Fall, 1984 Digest)
