= Escape from Westerville State =

Escape from Westerville State is a 1981 board game published by Tri Tac Games.

== Gameplay ==
Escape from Westerville State is a game in which players portray eccentric hospital patients making a wild, comedic dash for freedom.

== Reviews ==
- Abyss Quarterly #50 (Winter, 1992)
