= Damocles (The Morrow Project) =

Post-apocalyptic role-playing adventure

- Cover art by H.N. Voss
- Author: Bill Worzel; H.N. Voss
- Illustrator: H.N. Voss
- Genre: Post-apocalyptic
- Publisher: Timeline
- Publication date: 1982
- Preceded by: Liberation at Riverton
- Followed by: Operation Lucifer

Damocles is an adventure published by Timeline in 1982 for the post-apocalyptic role-playing game The Morrow Project.

== Contents ==
Recon G-9 team is awoken in Michigan 150 years after a nuclear holocaust, and are ordered to take control of Damocles, an experimental military computer equipped with artificial intelligence housed in an underground complex and guarded by autonomous robots. The team must also deal with inter-community wars, wolf packs, and the near-permanent post-nuclear winter.

The book also contains vehicle plans, a replica of the navigation system, equipment sheets, and various floor plans for important locations.

== Publication history ==
Timeline published the post-apocalyptic role-playing game The Morrow Project in 1980, and between 1982 and 2013, published eleven adventures, the second in 1982 being Damocles, a 40-page book written by Bill Worzel and H.N. Voss, with artwork by Voss.

== Reception ==
In Issue 62 The Space Gamer, William A. Barton commented "Overall, Damocles is quite well done and should provide quite a bit of gaming enjoyment for TMP players, whether it is used as a one-shot scenario or as the first in what could be a lengthy campaign."

In Issue 2 of the British game magazine Imagine, Chris Baylis noted "The scenario is very well designed, but tends to get bogged down in the middle. An experienced [ Project Director ] will have the forethought to include minor (yet not fatal) diversions to keep the players' minds occupied during these passing phases."

In Issue 46 of Different Worlds, Joseph Benedetto warned "although it has a high potential for being a shoot-' em-up, it is actually a 'let's think this one through' game." Benedetto concluded, "A very fun module, it is more suited for experienced players, and those who realize that it is often better to talk than to shoot."
