= Haunter =

Haunter or Haunters may refer to:

- Haunter (Pokémon), a Pokémon species
- Haunter (film), a 2013 Canadian supernatural horror film
- Haunters, a 2010 South Korean science fiction action film
- The Haunter of the Dark, story by H. P. Lovecraft

== See also ==
- Ghost
- Haunt (disambiguation)
- Haunts (disambiguation)
- Haunted (disambiguation)
- The Haunting (disambiguation)
