= The Haunting (Nixon novel) =

1998 young adult novel by Joan Lowery Nixon

- First edition cover
- Author: Joan Lowery Nixon
- Language: English
- Genre: Young adult horror
- Publisher: Delacorte Books
- Publication date: 10 August 1998
- Publication place: United States
- Media type: Print (Hardcover, Paperback)
- Pages: 184 pp
- ISBN: 0-385-32247-X

The Haunting is a mystery novel for young adults by American writer Joan Lowery Nixon, first published in 1998.

== Plot summary ==
As the story opens, Lia, 15, is at her great-grandmother Sarah's bedside. Delirious, the old woman begins to speak of Graymoss Plantation, the Louisiana family estate left unoccupied for decades because of a "terrible, fearful evil." After the woman's death, Lia discovers that the house has been willed to her mother, who plans to move the family in and adopt a group of hard-to-place children. Lia is against this idea and vows to prove to her mother that the house is truly haunted. She learns that the ghostly occurrences are well documented and that several locals oppose the family taking up residence at Graymoss. Could one of these people be staging the hauntings? Lia has a change of heart, however, after she meets the children her parents want to care for and resolves to take on the ghosts herself. Aided by a collection of Edgar Allan Poe's stories, she eventually succeeds in driving the spirits away. The ghosts are reminiscent of those in Shirley Jackson's classic The Haunting of Hill House, whispering through the walls and sending books flying through the air.

== Characters ==
Some of the characters in this book are:

- Lia Starling (the main character)
- Derek and Anne Starling (Lia's parents)
- Augusta Langley Moore (Lia's grandmother)
- Jolie (Lia's best friend)
- Jonathan (Hannah Lord's grandson)
- Charlotte Blevins (Lia's great-great-great-grandmother)
- Placide Blevins (Charlotte's grandfather)
- Morgan Slade (Placide's foreman)
- Charles Boudreau (the caretaker of Graymoss Plantation)
- Raymond Merle (a land developer)
- Hannah Lord (the president of the Bogue City Historical Society and Jonathan's grandmother)
- Homer Tavey (an antiques dealer)
- Ava Phillips (woman living in an old cabin in Graymoss Plantation)
- Sheriff (takes care of the crime)
