= Spectrangle =

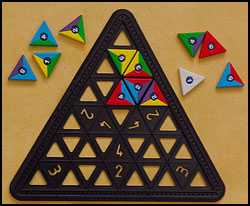
- Players place triangular tiles to gain the highest score.
- Players: 1–4
- Setup time: 1 minute
- Playing time: 45 minutes
- Chance: Medium
- Age range: 8 +
- Skills: Strategic thought

Spectrangle is a triangular tile-based abstract strategy game invented by Alan John Fraser-Dackers, Maxwell Graham Gordon and Lester Wynne Jordan. The principles behind the game are based on the work of British mathematician Percy Alexander MacMahon. The original game was for up to 8 players and used 60 tiles. A later more compact version for up to four players uses 36 tiles. It is this version that is described here.

The game uses colourful double-sided triangular playing tiles called trangs. The trangs use all the permutations of red, yellow, green, cyan and magenta to give 35 unique trangs, plus one all-white 'joker'. Each trang is marked with a number that is the basic scoring value of that tile. The trangs are played onto a triangular game board; some of the spaces are marked with a number that is the bonus value of the space (unmarked spaces having a bonus value of 1).

== Gameplay ==
The aim of the multi-player game is to score the most points by playing your trangs most effectively.

All the trangs are placed in the cloth bag provided, each player then draws a trang from the bag. The player drawing the highest valued trang becomes the opening player. The trangs are returned to the bag and each player then draws a hand of five trangs which are placed on the table in front of the player. Throughout the game all trangs drawn are to remain in full view of all players.

The opening player plays into a space on the board; this opening play can not be into numbered bonus space. The value of the trang is recorded as this player's score. The player then draws a trang from the bag to maintain a hand of five trangs on display. Once played, trangs are not moved.

Play now proceeds in turn. At each turn the player must, if they are able to, play a trang from their hand alongside at least one of the trangs already played. Wherever trangs touch they must match in colour (white matches any colour). The score for the play is calculated and added to the running total for that player. A replacement trang is then drawn from the bag as before. If the player is unable to play then they do not score; however, they do have the option of replacing one of their trangs with a replacement drawn from the bag.

The score for a play is calculated by multiplying the value of the trang by the bonus value of the space and then by the number of existing trangs that the trang is placed in contact with. This means that a high score can be obtained if it is possible to play a trang onto a number bonus space that touches more than one existing trang.

When all possible plays have been made the game is over. The total value any trangs remaining in hand is deducted from that player's total. The winner is the one with the highest score.

== History ==
The original version of the game was invented by Graham Gordon in 1989. Graham Gordon played the first game with his son Luke (then aged 10), which was won by his son. The first name for the game was Spectromino though this was later changed to Spectrangle following a round table discussion which also included Alan's wife Ann. Graham Gordon then, together with Alan Dackers, and Lester Jordan developed the game for the market place and initiated the patent application. Many of the rules and gameplay were tested at "The Thorn" pub in Appleton Thorn, Cheshire with a game played over lunchtime drinks. The name for the playing pieces "Trangs" was a suggestion from Alan Dackers. The game achieved its worldwide popularity thanks to the help and investment of Max Morrison.

The game has in the past been published by Ghengis Games (the original patent holders company), Greystone Games, Spears Games, Jumbo and Educational Insights, Incorporated. The game appears to be 'out of print' at the moment.

== Awards ==
- Spectrangle won the 1993 Årets Spel (Game of the Year) award for best family game
