= Edge of the Sword Vol. 1: Compendium of Modern Firearms =

Tabletop role-playing game supplement

Edge of the Sword Vol. 1: Compendium of Modern Firearms is a role-playing game supplement published by R. Talsorian Games in 1991.

== Contents ==
Compendium of Modern Firearms, written by Kevin Dockery, was published as the first manual released in a series intended to focus on the use of modern paramilitary topics in role-playing games. The book examines dozens of late 20th-century firearms, detailing the physical appearance, intended use, statistics, probability charts for accuracy at various distances, and damage. Appendices provide metric to Imperial conversions, and, since this supplement is not designed for a specific role-playing system, suggested conversions of the given weapon statistics to popular game systems such as Advanced Dungeons & Dragons and Call of Cthulhu.

== Reception ==
In the April 1993 edition of Dragon (Issue #192), Rick Swan called this book "comprehensive", and gave a strong recommendation for gamers of modern-day role-playing games, saying, "The staggering amount of research makes this the definitive resource on modern weapons for serious players."

== Reviews ==
- The Unspeakable Oath #5 (Spring, 1992 Digest)
