= Forbidden Bridge =

Board game

Top cover for Forbidden Bridge

Forbidden Bridge is a board game first released in 1992 by Milton Bradley which simulates being a treasure hunter. Players assume the role of explorers who are after ancient jewels, which are guarded by an angry spirit. Occasionally, the bridge guard will awaken and (via a motorized mechanism powered by the player pushing his head down) shake the bridge, which can cause players' pieces to fall off. Players also can get the chance to "steal" another player's jewel. The first player to retrieve two jewels and return them all in their boat wins.

== Contents ==
- Bridge^{1}
  - 2 spans (connect the idol and the cliff)
  - 13 planks (spaces players can land on)
  - 7 railings (can save a piece when the bridge is shaking)
- Idol cliff^{1}
  - 2 hands
  - Platform
- 2-piece climbing cliff^{1}
- Gameboard
  - 8 plastic rock pieces (hold scenery in place)
  - 4 cardboard slides (contain jungle scenery; not essential to gameplay)
- 4 explorer pawns
- 4 boats
- 15 jewels with storage bag
- 2 dice
- Label sheet

^{1} Single piece once assembled

== Gameplay ==
The game is played by 2 to 4 players and is suitable for ages 7 and up. Each player begins their turn by rolling the included six-sided dice: one numbered die (with 2, 3 and 5 repeated twice) and one "special" die with three possibilities (each of which appears on two of its sides):

- Idol icon: The idol becomes angry. When its head is pressed down it will shake the bridge; any players whose pieces fall are considered to be on the closest land space to where their piece landed (i.e. pieces cannot be in the water).
- Explorer icon: The player may move another player's piece to a different position on their bridge space. This can be important, as the pegs and rails on the bridge spaces become crucial when the idol shakes the bridge, and some spots on a space are safer than others.
- Jewel icon: The player may steal another player's jewel if the player is on, or lands on, the same space as that player.

== Other Features ==
- Although the box art for the game portrays the Idol as merely being a head with hands (its mouth being at ground level), the Idol in the actual game has a space below its head that contains five glyphs. The glyphs are: A stick figure, a jewel, a stick figure with the jewel as its body, lightning, and a skull. The glyphs are supposed to be a warning to those wishing to take jewels; the stick figure is the explorer, the figure with the jewel as its body is the explorer having taken a jewel, the lightning represents the Idol's anger, and the skull represents the resulting death or injury.
- The idol itself is motorized and does not require batteries. The idol is activated by pressing down on his head. Doing so winds up the motor, and when the head is released, his hands shake and move the bridge back and forth.

== 2021 Remake ==
Hasbro Gaming remade the board game classic in Q3 2021. The remake is exclusively sold at Target.
