= Operation Lucifer =

Post-apocalyptic role-playing game adventure

Damocles
- Cover art by H.N. Voss
- Author: Bill Worzel; H.N. Voss
- Illustrator: H.N. Voss
- Genre: Post-apocalyptic
- Publisher: Timeline
- Publication date: 1982
- Preceded by: Damocles
- Followed by: The Ruins of Chicago

Operation Lucifer is an adventure published by Timeline Ltd. in 1982 for the post-apocalyptic role-playing game The Morrow Project.

== Plot summary ==
Morrow Recon Team G-5 in Wisconsin is awakened by the United States strategic defense computer Damocles to find and disarm an unexploded thermonuclear warhead. The team have to survive encounters with an armed militia and somehow infiltrate a religious cult in order to reach the warhead.

== Publication history ==
Timeline published The Morrow Project in 1980, and between 1982 and 2013, published eleven adventures, the third being Operation Lucifer, a 36-page book published in 1982 that was written by D. Patrick Beckfield and H.N. Voss, and illustrated by Voss.

== Reception ==
In Issue 20 of the British game magazine Imagine, Chris Baylis was disappointed, commenting, "The vital part of all these scenarios is the interaction with the NPCs, and this suffers for the want of better ones."

In Issue 72 of The Space Gamer, William A. Barton commented that "Operation Lucifer is a competent adventure for The Morrow Project and should provide [the gamemaster|Project Director] and players with a challenging – and potentially hazardous – game mission."

In Issue 46 of Different Worlds, Joseph Benedetto noted "Full of excellent details, this is a good module for beginners although it can become a wild-goose chase if the players aren't kept on course." Benedetto concluded, "Definitely not a shoot-' em up (except perhaps at the end)."
