= Haunted (band) =

Italian metal band

Haunted is an Italian doom metal band. They have released three albums, among which one on Ripple Music.

The band is fronted by vocalist Cristina Chimirri.

== Discography ==
- Haunted (2016)
- Dayburner (2018)
- Stare at Nothing (2024)
