= Rogue 417 =

Role-playing game supplement

Rogue 417 is a 1984 role-playing game supplement for Fringeworthy published by Tri Tac Games.

== Contents ==
Rogue 417 is the first expansion module for Fringeworthy, and explores the devastation caused by the unintentional release of the highly deadly virus called Rogue 417 after accident in Syrian laboratory.

== Reception ==
William A. Barton reviewed Rogue 417 in Space Gamer No. 70. Barton commented that "Overall, Rogue 417 is an excellent first expansion module for Fringeworthy and should prove useful to gamers of any after-the-holocaust RPG currently on the market. I recommend it highly."

== Reviews ==
- Game News #10 (Dec., 1985)
