= Eurocrat =

Bureaucrat of the European Union

A Eurocrat (a portmanteau of "European" and "bureaucrat") is "a staff member of the administrative commission of the European Union" or more broadly, any official of the European Union. The term was coined by Richard Mayne, a journalist and personal assistant to the first Commission president, Walter Hallstein, in 1961.

There are three main types of Eurocrats. Firstly, Political Appointees, such as the European Commissioners or the Members of the European Parliament. Secondly, there are fonctionnaires or functionaries, meaning the permanent staff which form the majority of the European institutions. There are two categories of fonctionnaires, Assistants and Administrators. The former perform "secretarial" roles while the latter have more policy-related or managerial responsibilities. The third category is the contractual agents. Contractual agents do not have an employment contract with the same conditions as the fonctionnaires. Their first job contract is limited in duration, and only after several renewals can this contract be extended permanently. Eurocrats generally come from all member states of the European Union. EPSO is the main body which selects staff for recruitment to the European Institutions.

Nowadays the term Eurocrat has come to encompass staff from all EU Institutions and not only staff from the European Commission.

Although the term Eurocrat might convey negative connotations for some, specialists of European Union and its institutions Didier Georgagakakis and Jay Rowell use the concept of Eurocracy as a way to describe and analyse EU actors and professionals interactions.

== See also ==
- Euromyth
- List of European Commissioners by nationality
