= The Morrow Project =

Post-apocalyptic tabletop role-playing game

- First edition cover
- Designers: 1st, 2nd, 3rd Edition: Kevin Dockery; Robert Sadler; Richard Tucholka; 4th Edition: Christopher Morrell; Robert O'Connor
- Publishers: Timeline Ltd.
- Publication: 1980 (1st edition); 1980 (2nd edition); 1983 (3rd edition); 2013 (4th edition)
- Genres: Post-apocalyptic
- Systems: Timeline System

The Morrow Project is a 1980 science fiction role-playing game created by Kevin Dockery, Robert Sadler and Richard Tucholka and published by Timeline Ltd. It is set after a devastating nuclear war. The fourth edition of the game was published in December 2013, designed by Chris Morrell and Robert O'Connor.

== History ==
In 1974, Robert Sadler wrote an outline for a post-apocalyptic adventure story. Richard Tucholka added a second chapter, but then the project was buried for a year or more. In 1975, they were introduced to roleplaying, and Tucholka suddenly realized that The Morrow Project could be an adventure background for a roleplaying game. He used Sadler's story as a guide to write that game background. Then the two joined forces with Kevin Dockery to flesh out the military portion of the game.

After months of playtesting, it was run at an early Michicon and was a great success there. At that point, Timeline Games was born and shortly thereafter, due to internal conflicts, both Richard Tucholka and Robert Sadler left Timeline Games and created Tacky-Tac Games, which later became Tri Tac Games.

In late 2012, after several years of development, a Kickstarter campaign was run to provide the funds to finish the fourth edition of The Morrow Project. The new edition was released on December 15, 2013, and was designed by Chris Morrell and Robert O'Connor.

== Setting ==
The game is based around the idea that a group of American industrialists predicted the coming of an apocalyptic nuclear war, and began to create a plan for an emergency operations and reconstruction infrastructure that would survive that war. This plan is the eponymous "Morrow Project". A number of volunteers were cryonically frozen in hidden bunkers called boltholes. They were provided with substantial caches of supplies and equipment, intended to help the teams rebuild civilization -- once the war had ended, it was thought some places would be identified where the hazards such as nuclear fallout had diminished sufficiently.

The plan was for the Morrow Project to be coordinated by a central command post and record-keeping facility called "Prime Base." This is an immense self-contained bunker with various annexes, hidden underground in Nevada, in the canyons near Soldier Meadow. Its details are explained in the game book entitled "Prime Base." The facility's advanced life support systems and huge variety of other equipment were intended to allow the Project's leaders not to sleep through the war, so as to chronicle it and be in the best position to determine out what should be done next. The Project's "Phoenix Team," a highly secret Tier-I special operations unit of approximately platoon strength, was also here, but kept in suspended animation to be used only on the highest authority if there was no alternative.

Prime Base was built in isolation according to schedule, but just before it could assume its role it was sabotaged and bombed by a shadowy madman called Krell, sustaining serious damage. The sudden attack wiped out the Morrow Project leaders, but 150 years after the war, the damaged central computer at Prime Base finally began to issue one or more wakeup signals. This revived at least one of the Morrow Project assets -- the team that the player characters are part of. The status of other Teams is purposefully kept unclear, so that details can be worked out by the person coordinating the game, who is called the Project Director.

The game therefore centers around the question of whether the Project is hopelessly compromised, or whether its scattered outposts can reconnect and replace the non-functional headquarters. Must they try to confront huge reconstruction tasks alone, when it was expected that thousands of Project members would help them? Do they have the courage to try?

=== Initial scenario ===
The initial scenario may be played with nothing other than the game book, dice, paper and pencil. Expansion sets are available introducing further scenarios, weapons and equipment.

One hundred and fifty years after the Third World War, the members of the Morrow Project wake to a strange world. Instead of being part of an organized plan to rebuild their civilization, they find themselves isolated in a world where the War is only a distant legend, the people are ignorant of anything but the struggle to survive and strange mutated animals haunt their footsteps.

Players of the Morrow Project must not only survive, but must carry out their original mission: to rebuild the world. To do this, players have their equipment, training, and a team.

Included in the game book there are extensive details on the Morrow Project's teams, vehicles, weapons, other equipment, medical details, the various dangers arising from nuclear weapons effects, and also information to help the Project Director decide which people and creatures exist in the post-holocaust world -- in particular various animals affected in either more or less scientifically accurate ways. Up until Fourth Edition, there was also detailed information on which locations in the United States had been struck by Soviet ICBMs, which of the enemy MIRVs had failed to detonate, and which had struck targets other than those intended.

=== MARS, recon, science and specialty ===
While each team is equipped to survive on its own, it proved impossible to equip all the teams for every postwar contingency. For example, some Recon Teams are almost as heavily armed as mobile assault, rescue and strike (MARS) teams, while others are not.

With teams having been put to sleep over a course of several years from the 1960s onwards, there will also be variations in the equipment they have. In some cases, teams may wake to find new equipment they are not yet trained on, and will have to teach themselves from instructional materials.

Below is a general summary of the Project groups:

- Recon: The general purpose teams of the Project and the most numerous, Recon teams are equipped with varying types of weapons and equipment ranging from V-150 armored cars to SK-5 hovercraft. Their orders are to reconnoiter the countryside, report on local conditions, and provide advice to Prime Base concerning which teams should be awakened next.
- MARS: These teams make up the military arm of the Project -- they are extremely formidable and heavily armed. In addition to conventional weapons, some of these teams have man-portable laser weapons, and some have an early generation of no-nonsense, minimalist powered armor. The purpose of the MARS teams is to support and defend civilians and other teams. A large portion of MARS team members are ex-military personnel with combat experience. Some MARS teams have heavy vehicles such as the Mars One, a large custom-built articulated vehicle with very heavy armor and powerful weapons. It is able to carry troops, employ onboard sensors, provide early warning, and serve as a command post.
- Science: The Science teams are broadly cross-trained scientific and technical units that can cope with a wide range of situations -- from complex medical care and epidemiology to understanding unusual hazards and dangerous creatures. Their areas of knowledge range from biology to nuclear physics. They are equipped with a second type of versatile custom-built articulated vehicle, called the Science One, and have armament second only to that of the MARS teams.
- Specialty: This is a broad term applied to Project groups that have a non-standard function in regard to their equipment and personnel. Specialty groups generally consist of assets frozen with orders to meet at a predesignated point. Most Specialty teams are not as heavily armed as Recon or MARS teams, because the Project's planners felt that those teams could not fully perform the necessary functions if survivors felt threatened by them. Specialty groups assigned to the Project include:

Engineering: Building, construction, repair and maintenance of Project and civilian equipment.
Agricultural: Farming and livestock preserved by using frozen embryos. Equipped to build and assist farming communities.
Psychological: Formed to handle extremist groups, riots, negotiation challenges, and other serious problems caused by stress.
Aviation: Air survey reconnaissance, fire support, and air mobility support for other teams. These missions are done with fixed-wing aircraft including cargo planes, as well as light helicopters, early types of unmanned aerial vehicles, and custom-built autogyros that are modular and man-portable.
Command: Oversight of Combined Group assets, both mobile field teams and fixed installations, generally for a city or limited geographical area such as. Combined Group Seattle.
Frozen Watch: Casualty replacement personnel for the field teams, as well as Morrow Project field police, internal security, and counterintelligence functions.
Power Reception: Reception of electrical power which is scheduled to be transmitted via microwaves, once Morrow Project power satellites have been lofted.
Support: Logistical support such as supply, repair, and replacement operations.
Communications: Restore radio frequency, laser microwave, and eventually even satellite communications. They also maintain the project's clandestine extremely low frequency systems that very slowly accumulate Prime Base's messages, such as briefings, for teams to read when they awaken—thus counterbalancing the minuscule data rate. For security reasons, ELF systems were not for use until after the war.
Medical: Health care for the general population and for project assets. Generally equipped with a fixed installation.
Decontamination: Render safe personnel, vehicles and structures contaminated by radiological, biological, or chemical hazards. Also assist in the salvage of equipment and materials recovered from unsafe areas.

== Publications ==
=== Supplements ===
- Game Master's Package: Basic Vehicular Loads was a supplement detailing basic equipment loads, with three copies of each, for 11 different Morrow Project vehicles. It was published by Timeline Ltd. in 1980 as 39 xeroxed sheets, stapled in groups. A second edition was published in 1980, as 39 loose-leaf hole-punched sheets with a large envelope. William A. Barton reviewed Vehicular Basic Loads in The Space Gamer No. 48. Barton commented that "If you're a Morrow Project GM, you should find these Vehicular Base Loads sheets of use in your campaigns."
- The Morrow Project Vehicular Blueprints (1980)
- Personal Basic Loads (1980)
- The Morrow Project Gamemaster's Shield and Reference Tables (1981)
- Security Cover Sheets (1981)
- Personal and Vehicular Basic Loads and The Morrow Project Role Playing Expansion (1983)
- Project Director's Screen

=== Adventures ===
- Damocles (1982)
- Liberation at Riverton (1982)
- Operation Lucifer (1982)
- The Ruins of Chicago (1983)
- The Starnaman Incident (1984)
- Operation Lonestar (1985)
- Desert Search (1986)
- Prime Base (1987)

== Reception ==
In the May 1981 edition of The Space Gamer (Issue No. 39), William A. Barton commented that "overall, I'd have to give The Morrow Project the highest of ratings as a SF role-playing system. If it isn't at least nominated for the Origins awards this year, there just ain't no justice in gameland.".

In the June 1981 edition of Dragon (Issue #50), Bill Fawcett thought the combat realism of the rules made it "suitable, with very few changes, for a role-playing game of World War III infantry and armored combat." He did note the resultant complexity of the rules, saying, "The price of this realism is the great amount of dice-rolling necessary to determine the location and effect of wounds." Fawcett was not as impressed with the rest of the rules. "There is nothing too distinctive about the game system as a whole." He suggested that two types of gamers would be interested in this game: "those who are interested in modern weapons and combat, and those who play the Gamma World game, who will find the ideas in this game readily adaptable to that system."

Chris Baylis reviewed The Morrow Project for Imagine magazine, and stated that "My first impressions of the Morrow Project made me want to begin a game immediately. The idea seemed new and exciting, and the system looked advanced, well thought out and imaginative."

Phil Masters reviewed The Morrow Project for White Dwarf #42, giving it an overall rating of 5 out of 10, and stated that "The Morrow Project is a game with a very specific style, a lot of strengths. and a lot of weaknesses. Like any post-holocaust game, it may be a little depressing; it is certainly quite violent. It is, by current standards, simple and playable, and could be worse at the price."

Barron Barnett reviewed The Morrow Project for Different Worlds magazine and stated that "You should try The Morrow Project out for yourself and see what a great role-playing game it really is."

In his 1990 book The Complete Guide to Role-Playing Games, game critic Rick Swan called this the most graphic and chilling RPG depiction of near-future nuclear carnage ever published." Swan was surprised that, given the great amount of detail given to nuclear war and military weapons, "the character creation rules are surprisingly fuzzy." Swan found that "The game comes alive with the combat rules, the most detailed treatment of violent encounters this side of Aftermath!" Swan concluded by giving the game a rating of 2.5 out of 4, saying, "As a game, Morrow Project has too many ambiguous rules for casual players, though hard-core science-fiction fans might enjoy it. But as a sourcebook of nuclear holocaust, it's without peer, unreservedly recommended to anyone with an interest in the subject."
