= Stalking the Night Fantastic =

Role-playing game

Bureau 13
Stalking the Night Fantastic
- First edition cover
- Designers: Richard Tucholka; Chris Beiting; Robert Sadler
- Publishers: Tri Tac Games
- Publication: 1983 (1st edition); 1984 (2nd edition); 1990 (3rd edition); 1992 (4th edition); 2007 (5th special edition); 2008 (6th d20 Edition)
- Genres: Horror
- Systems: Custom or d20

Stalking the Night Fantastic is a supernatural horror role-playing game published by Tri-Tac Inc. in 1983. Several editions of the game were published before it was revised as re-published as Bureau 13.

== Description ==
Stalking the Night Fantastic is an eccentric supernatural horror system set in the near future in which the players are agents of the ultra-secret Bureau 13, an organization dedicated to fighting the growing influence of black magic and the supernatural.

The character creation system uses 17 abilities to define a player character, most determined by rolling four six-sided dice then subtracting 4, resulting in a range of 0-20. Some are determined by rolling 2 dice and subtracting 20, or are calculated from previously generated ability scores. Once abilities have been determined, occupational skills and other skills are determined.

There are also rules for magic and psionics. The game has two combat systems, a complicated "Recommended Play" system for players, and a streamlined "Fast Play" system for non-player characters. In addition, there are over twenty different tables covering various ways that characters can die, from asphyxiation to car accidents.

== Publication history ==
Stalking the Night Fantastic was designed by Richard Tucholka, Chris Beiting, and Robert Sadler, and published by Tri-Tac in 1983 as a square-bound 104-page book

The following year, Tri-tac published a second edition that was ring-bound, as well as two supplements, Module 1: Hellsnight and Module 2: Haunts.

In 1990, Tri Tac revamped the game and re-released it as Bureau 13.

== Reception ==
In Issue 29 of Abyss, Eric Olson commented, "The system is quite well done and lots of fun. As with any system, a good deal of it relies on the gamemaster." Olson also liked the streak of humor "which runs through the rules. This makes for easier and more enjoyable reading." Olson concluded, "STNF gives you everything you need to run it and you don't need a world to run it in as it is set in the modern day. A good buy."

In the July 1984 edition of Dragon (Issue 87), Jerry Epperson felt the strongest part of Stalking the Night Fantastic was the list of encounters, which "run the entire gauntlet from African Witch Doctors and Aliens to Purple Monsters and Shapeless Disgusting Things." But he had a number of issues with the game. He pointed out that although a character can theoretically have an ability score of zero, none of the ability score tables gave results for scores lower than 1. Epperson also disliked the two separate combat systems for characters and NPCs, which tilted combat results in favour of the NPCs. Epperson also found the rules very disorganized, saying, "an index would be indispensable as a gaming aid." He concluded that "Stalking the Night Fantastic is not terrible game, just a very near miss... The game would suit 'tinkerers' or those GMs who only buy a game to get inspiration for their own systems. Beginners or players who are not enthusiastic about putting in some overtime on reworking the rules would do better to stay away from this one."

In Issue 3 of Different Worlds, Scott Dollinger stated, "Stalking the Night Fantastic is a complete adventure game system that is contained in a 104-page book complete with a section on monsters and blank character sheets suitable for photocopying. The problems with the system itself are not that insurmountable. If the combat system seems cumbersome, one can always use the fast method." Dollinger concluded, "The major problems with this game stem from the lack of quality taken in the production of the materials and poor background material on Bureau 13."

In Issue 3 of the game magazine Gateways, Greg Sherwood commented "Play time with Stalking is usually fast, furious, and fun. Any situation in the Game Masters' mind can be brought into the game for the enjoyment of the players." Sherwood also noted "Since themes can run from the exorcism of a poltergeist to dealing with the fish-men in the local swimming hole, boredom is rarely a factor."

In his 1990 book The Complete Guide to Role-Playing Games, game critic Rick Swan was not impressed, writing, "Investigating the supernatural is a great idea for an RPG, as evidenced by Call of Cthulhu and Beyond the Supernatural, but you wouldn't know it from Stalking the Night Fantastic, which is neither scary nor particularly exciting." Swan thought the character generation system was far too complicated, noting that several of the 14 attribute such as Dexterity and Agility, were redundant. Swan was also not pleased with the two combat systems, one for players and the other for non-player characters, pointing out that "The results are wildly inconsistent; a wounded NPC, for instance, may continue to function without any ill effects, but a wounded PC may suffer shattered bones and spurting arteries." Swan concluded by giving this game a very poor rating of only 1.5 out of 4, saying, "There's an above average encounter section ... but it's not enough to offset the game's considerable deficiencies."
