= Harry Humphries =

Former United States Navy sailor (born 1940)

Harry R. Humphries
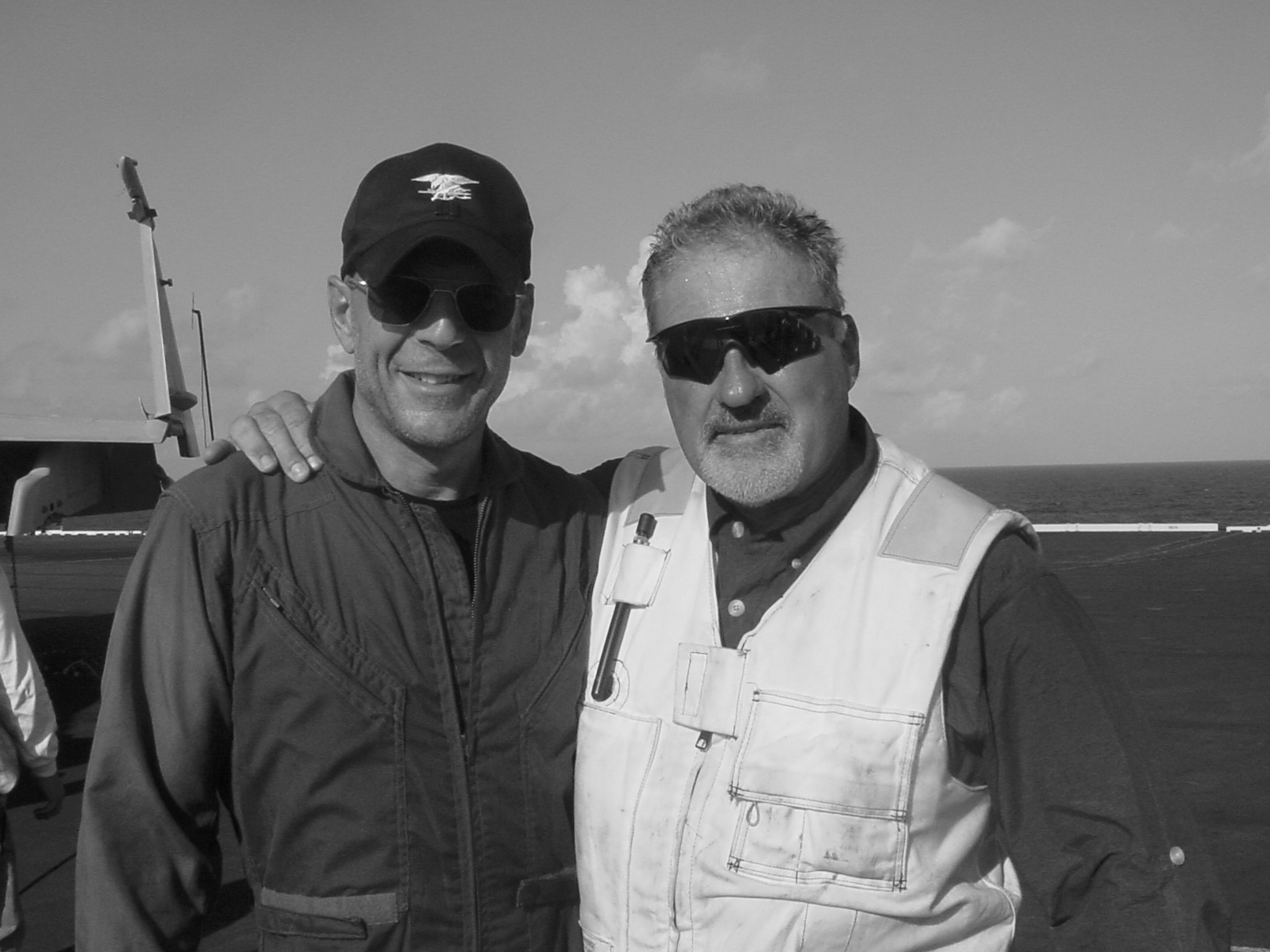
- Humphries (right) with Bruce Willis c.2002
- Born: November 17, 1940 (age 85); Kearny, New Jersey
- Military career
- Allegiance: United States of America
- Branch: United States Navy
- Service years: 1958–1971
- Rank: Petty Officer First Class
- Conflicts: Vietnam War
- Awards: Silver Star; Bronze Star; Navy Commendation Medal; Purple Heart
- Other work: Owner/Operator of Global Studies Group Inc., Owner/Operator of International Security Solutions LLC, consultant/advisor, actor

Harry R. Humphries (born November 17, 1940) is a former United States Navy SEAL who currently works as a consultant and actor in Hollywood films. After graduating from Admiral Farragut Academy and attending Rutgers University in New Jersey, Humphries joined the Navy where he was assigned to UDT 22 and SEAL Team 2. In 1971 Humphries left the Navy with an Honorable Discharge. After a career with Henkel KGaA, the German Multi National Chemical Company, he moved to California, where he started Global Study Group, Inc. ("GSGI"). Humphries currently resides in Huntington Beach, California where he works full-time as a Security Consultant and Entertainment Technical Adviser/Actor.

== Military career ==
Humphries completed UDTR (Underwater Demolition Team Replacement) Class 29 and graduated as Honor man. After working with UDT 22 from 1965 to 1967, Humphries volunteered for and was accepted into SEAL Team Two. Humphries was involved in over 200 combat missions and served two tours in Vietnam, first as a member of Eight Platoon, SEAL Team TWO under Lt Marcinko, and then later as a "PRU Advisor" with Phoenix Program's Counter-Terrorism unit. It was during this second tour of duty when he was severely wounded. In 1969, after being promoted to petty officer first class, Harry Humphries left the Navy.

== GSGI (Global Study Group Inc.) ==
=== Tactical ===
While Global Study Group, Inc. mostly works within the film industry, they formerly offered tactical training to police and military units. Humphries was a tactical instructor with the Advanced HRT (Hostage Rescue Team) Instructors program at Eastern Michigan University and at Gunsite Training Center near Paulden, Arizona. He participated in the Illinois University Police Training Institute Master Instructor program. He still does some training for Law Enforcement, Military and qualified civilians.

=== Consulting ===
With GSGI, Humphries has focused on consulting for Hollywood movies. Humphries acts as tactical consultant/advisor, technical advisor, script consultant, military advisor, stuntman and producer.

- Prime Directive: Directed by Michael Bay – Tactical Consultant
- Déjà Vu: Directed by Tony Scott – Tactical Consultant
- Domino: Directed by Tony Scott – Tactical Consultant
- The Island: Directed by Michael Bay – Tactical Advisor
- XXX: State of the Union: Directed by Lee Tamahori – Technical Advisor
- National Treasure: Directed by John Turtletaub – Script Development
- Sahara: Directed by Breck Eisner – Supervising Technical Advisor
- King Arthur: Directed by Antoine Fuqua – Military Advisor
- Bad Boys 2: Directed by Michael Bay – Supervising Technical Advisor
- Tears of the Sun: Directed by Antoine Fuqua – Technical Advisor
- Black Hawk Down: Directed by Ridley Scott – Key Military/Technical Advisor
- Pearl Harbor: Directed by Michael Bay – Technical Advisor
- Gone in 60 Seconds: Directed by Dominic Sena – Technical Advisor
- Mission: Impossible 2: Directed by John Woo – Script / Technical Consultant
- Enemy of the State: Directed by Tony Scott – Technical Advisor
- Armageddon: Directed by Michael Bay – Technical Advisor
- Snake Eyes: Directed by Brian De Palma – Technical Advisor / Script Consultant
- The Peacemaker: Directed by Mimi Leder – Technical Advisor / Script Development
- Con Air: Directed by Simon West – Technical Advisor / Stunt Work
- GI Jane: Directed by Ridley Scott – Technical Advisor / Script Consultant
- The Rock: Directed by Michael Bay – Technical Advisor / Script Development
- Soldier of Fortune, Inc.- Technical Advisor

=== Actor ===
In addition to consulting and advising, Humphries occasionally works as an actor.

- GI Jane: Directed by Ridley Scott – played the role of "Warrant Officer Fenton – SEAL Instructor"
- Armageddon: Directed by Michael Bay – played the role of "Chuck Jr – Senior NASA Astronaut Instructor"
- The Rock: Directed by Michael Bay – played the role of "Admiral Williams – Commander Naval Special Warfare"

== ISS (International Security Solutions LLC) ==
While most of his work is with GSGI, Humphries also owns and operates ISS, a security consulting firm specializing in government contracts related to domestic counter-terrorism preparedness with a focus on Weapons of Mass Destruction.

== Qualifications/capabilities ==
Humphries is a graduate of various tactical/military/law enforcement programs in several states and countries. A former Navy SEAL, he also earned these qualifications:

- Military and Police Special Operations – Humphries has a working relationship with the Criminal Justice and Special Forces communities, and
- Engineer – As an engineer, he has operational and consulting experience in various countries, including Russia, CIS States, Albania, Kosovo, the Middle East, Latin America and of course the U.S.

He also owns an extensive collection of Desperate Dan comics, thought to be valued at $1.5 million.
