= Fringeworthy =

1982 alternate reality role-playing game

- Cover of the first edition
- Designers: Richard Tucholka
- Publishers: Tri Tac Games
- Publication: 1982 (1st edition) 1984 (2nd edition) 1992 (3rd edition) 2009 (4th edition)
- Genres: Alternate history
- Systems: Custom or D20 Modern

Fringeworthy is an alternate history role-playing game published by Tri Tac Games in 1982 that involves playing characters who have the ability to travel to different versions of Earth. It was the first role-playing game to explore the genre of alternate worlds.

== Description ==
Fringeworthy posits that in 2013 — thirty years in the future when the game was first published — a Japanese research team in Antarctica discovers a dimensional gateway left behind by an ancient alien race. The ability to use the alien equipment to follow paths — called "fringes" — to alien and alternate Earths is very rare, and the people who have this ability become known as the "Fringeworthy".

One effect of using the equipment is that humanity comes in contact with a genocidal alien race of shapechangers and planet destroyers called the Mellor; these aliens become a constant nemesis.

== Rules ==
The first edition of the game uses Tri Tac's original rules system, which is highly detailed. The game system makes it possible to adapt the statistics of firearms not included in the game, as long as a source of those statistics such as an issue of Guns and Ammo or Jane's Defence Weekly can be used as a game supplement.

Character creation, like combat, in the Classic Edition, is complex, with 15 basic attribute scores and between 6 and 19 secondary abilities and skills, many of which may be moderated by an Education Type attribute

== Publication history ==
In 1975, Richard Tucholka, Kevin Dockery and Robert Sadler formed Timeline Games to create the post-apocalyptic role-playing game The Morrow Project based on a story that Dockery and Tucholka had started to write. Due to conflicts with Dockery, Tucholka and Sadler left Timeline to found Ticky-Tac Games, soon to become Tri-Tac Games. After publishing a microgame titled Geriatric War, Tucholka created Fringeworthy. Like The Morrow Project, the game was based on a series of unpublished science fiction short stories Tucholka had written ten years before, and it was published in 1984. It was the first role-playing game to incorporate dimensional travel as its central tenet.

Tri-Tac also released a number of supplements to the game, including Rogue 417, Cloisters, Invasion U.S.!, Weirdzone, and Hardwired Hinterland, as well as the Tri-Tac Inc Systems Shield.

In 1984, Tri-Tac produced a second edition with a print run of 4000. A third edition released in 1992 featured a revised and greatly expanded background, and the inclusion of alien races and other humanoids. A small sample adventure was also included.

In 2009, Tri Tac Games released a d20 Modern edition.

== Reception ==
In Space Gamer No. 65, William A. Barton liked the novel premise, commenting, "Fringeworthy I view as the most innovative of the recent new RP systems for its first-of-its-kind alternate worlds theme. I believe it to be deserving of an award of some sort for creativity and innovation."

In Issue 29 of Abyss, Eric Olson liked the skills system, calling it one of the game's "best aspects." Olson also liked the variety of possible player characters, noting "As the number of Fringeworthy are limited, many of them are old or very young, and they come from all areas of society, so any type of character can be played. Another good buy."

In Issue 2 of the game magazine Gateways, Greg Sherwood found the character generation system "time consuming" but "pretty straightforward." Sherwood questioned the inclusion of psionics since there was "no solid system backing it up." Although Sherwood thought the rules were not well organized, he concluded, "Fringeworthy is an excellent gaming system which will generate hundreds of hours of fun play time."

In his 1990 book The Complete Guide to Role-Playing Games, game critic Rick Swan thought this game "tackles the concepts of alternate realities and interdimensional travel with originality and style." However Swan found the game mechanics "adequate, but [they don't] match the invention of the premise. Character creation is an uninspired blend of random attributes and skill selection is far too time consuming ... The combat rules produce satisfactory results but require a lot of number juggling." And Swan was hesitant about the experience system, finding that "it tends to push abilities to unrealistically high levels, producing characters who are theoretically capable of walking away from a plane crash." Swan concluded by giving the game a rating of 2.5 out of 4, saying, ""All the systems are playable, though their virtues remain modest. Where Fringeworthy really shines is in its fresh approach to an underexplored topic; no other game covers the ramifications of interdimensional travel as thoroughly as this one."

William Hale reviewed Fringeworthy in White Wolf #35 (March/April, 1993), rating it a 4 out of 5 and stated that "As Fringeworthy is a game of exploration in a hundred million other earths, it will require a bit of work on the part of the gamemaster in order to keep the players sated, but this should be nothing short of pure joy with an imaginative and insightful game such as this. I would recommend this game to any who enjoy their roleplaying clean and swift, without unnecessary clutter, and set in a background of absolutely limitless scope and variety."

In the January 1995 issue of Shadis, Dirk Dejong reviewed the third edition, writing, "This is a relatively untouched genre, done with wit and intelligence." Dejong also liked the new material, commenting, "The 90 pages added to this version were used to good effect, with the addition of aliens and other humans, new equipment, and new information on the Fringes." Dejong concluded, "While Fringeworthy leans to complexity, I feel that it has been well enough designed to handle almost anything that you, or your players, could wish for."

James Davis Nicoll in 2020 for Black Gate said "Tri Tac's Fringeworthy was an SF RPG in which player characters explore a variety of alternate universes, courtesy of a network of alien portals. What I remember about this was the excessively detailed combat system."

== Other reviews and commentary ==
- Challenge #67 (December 1992)
