= Richard Tucholka =

Writer, game designer and publisher

- Born: February 9, 1954
- Died: April 27, 2017 (aged 63)
- Occupation: Game designer
- Known for: The Morrow Project, Fringeworthy, Bureau 13, FTL:2448

Richard Tucholka (February 9, 1954 – April 27, 2017) was a writer, game designer and publisher, best known for his work in the creation of the role-playing games Fringeworthy and Bureau 13: Stalking the Night Fantastic.

== Career ==
In 1974, Richard Tucholka, a computer technician in Michigan, collaborated with Robert Sadler on a number of pieces of fiction. One of their stories was a post-apocalyptic adventure story called The Morrow Project, about people who awake from cryogenic sleep 150 years after a nuclear holocaust. After completing two chapters, the two left the story in hiatus.

The following year, Tucholka was introduced to the Dungeons & Dragons role-playing game (RPG), and he quickly realized that The Morrow Project could become an RPG. Using the story's setting as source material, Tucholka created the game background, and he and Sadler approached Kevin Dockery to add military realism to the game. After playtesting it at a local Michigan games convention, Tucholka, Sadler and Dockery formed Timeline Ltd. in 1979 to publish the new RPG.

Almost immediately, Tucholka and Sadler left Timeline due to creative differences with Dockery and formed their own games company, Tacky Tack Games, based in Pontiac, Michigan. Their first product was the light-hearted microgame Geriatric War, a fast-paced game where "characters battle over a few pension checks that survive the Social Security collapse of 2018".

Tucholka then created and published more serious RPGs such as Fringeworthy, the first RPG about dimensional travel, Bureau 13, the first horror RPG, and FTL: 2448, a space opera RPG. Given the more serious tone of these works, the company name was changed from Tacky Tack Games to the more professional-sounding Tri Tac Games in 1983.

Tucholka continued to create new games for Tri Tac, including Bureau 13, Hardwired Hinterland, Monster Squash, Pterroductyl, The Viral Vegetable Wars, Drive By, War on High, Escape From Westerville State, Baby Boomer, Duck Trooper, Beach Bunny Bimbos with Blasters and HOLES. He also created supplements and adventure scenarios for other games, including Invasion U.S., Cloistrs, Rogue 417, Weirdzone, Hellsnight, Haunts, Starcharts, and the DM's Book Of Nasty Tricks & Misfit Magic.

Tochulka was also a staff writer for Stardate and Stardrive small press magazines, and was the guest of honor at more than a dozen science fiction and games conventions.

== Personal life ==
Tucholka's hobbies included gardening, house restoration, reading, and B movies. He was a fan of science fiction, and his personal collection of SF novels numbered over 18,000. He died of cancer in 2017.

== Death ==
Richard passed away surrounded by his many friends and his wife, after a prolonged battle with cancer.

== Awards ==
Tucholka's creation Bureau 13: Stalking the Night Fantastic was voted Best Fantasy RPG of 1991 by the RPGA Network at Gen Con 1992.

== Bibliography ==
- Beach Bunny Bimbos with Blasters, 1991, Tri Tac Games
- Stalking the Night Fantastic, 1983 edition, Tri Tac Games
- Bureau 13: Stalking the Night Fantastic, 1984 edition, Tri Tac Games
- Bureau 13: Stalking the Night Fantastic, 1992 edition, Tri Tac Games
- Bureau 13: Special Edition, 2007 edition, Tri Tac Games w/Nick Pollotta
- Bureau 13: d20 Edition, 2008 edition, Tri Tac Games
- Bureau 13: EXTREME, 2009 edition, Tri Tac Games
- Bureau 13: Brass & Steam, 2014 edition, Tri Tac Games
  - Bureau 13 Adventures: Hellsnight, Haunts, The Lost Files, Vols 1 & 2, Tri Tac Games
  - Bureau 13: Black Powder 1859-1889, Tri Tac Games
  - Bureau 13: Scenes for Horror, Industry and Adventure, Tri Tac Games
- Fringeworthy, 1981 edition, Tri Tac Games
- Fringeworthy, 1984 edition, Tri Tac Games
- Fringeworthy, 1990 edition, Tri Tac Games
- Fringeworthy: d20 edition, 2009 edition, Tri Tac Games
  - Rogue 417, 1985 edition, Tri Tac Games
  - Invasion US, 1985, Tri Tac Games
  - Fringeworthy: PORTALS 1, Tri Tac Games
  - Fringeworthy: PORTALS 2, 2008 Tri Tac Games
  - Fringeworthy: PORTALS 3: Exploration Notebook, 2012 Tri Tac Games
  - Fringeworthy: PORTALS 4: Exploration War & Secrets, 2014 Tri Tac Games
  - Fringeworthy: Cloisters: A Century After the Winter War, 2012 Tri Tac Games
  - Fringeworthy: Weirdzone, 2010 Tri Tac Games
- Fringeworthy: Special Edition Sourcebook for the d20 OGL System: 2009 edition, Tri Tac Games
- FTL:2448, 1982 edition, Tri Tac Games
- FTL:2448, 1985, Tri Tac Games
- FTL:2448: Starcharts, 1984, Tri Tac Games
- FTL:2448: Cop 2448, 1984, Tri Tac Games
- FTL:2448 The Light Fantastic, Book One, 1990, Tri Tac Games
- FTL:2448 Frontier 2448, Book Two, 1990, Tri Tac Games
- Tri Tac Genesis, 2014, Tri Tac Games
- Tri Tac Genesis II, 2014, Tri Tac Games
- Incursion, 1992, Tri Tac Games
- Incursion II Canadians Across the Galactic Empire, 2012, Tri Tac Games
- Incursion III Poles Across the Galactic Empire, 2014, Tri Tac Games
- Hardwired Hinterland, 2009, Tri Tac Games
- Cloisters, 2012, Tri Tac Games
- Murderhoof, 2014, Tri Tac Games
- The Morrow Project, 1980 (1st edition), by Timeline Games, Ltd. Game authors: Kevin Dockery, Robert Sadler, and Richard Tucholka.
