= Tri Tac Games =

Game publisher

- Industry: Role-playing game publisher
- Headquarters: Pontiac, Michigan, United States
- Key people: Richard Tucholka
- Website: www.tritacgames.com

Tri Tac Games is a publisher of role-playing games based in Pontiac, Michigan. The company is built primarily on the work of Richard Tucholka, its founder and president.

== Company history ==
In 1974, Richard Tucholka collaborated with Robert Sadler on a number of pieces of fiction that eventually evolved into the post-apocalyptic role-playing game The Morrow Project. Tucholka and Sadler approached Kevin Dockery to add military realism to the game, and the three formed Timeline Ltd. in 1979 to publish the new RPG. The three ran into creative differences almost immediately, and Tucholka and Sadler left Timeline to form Tacky Tack Games. .

The company's first product was the humorous microgame Geriatric Wars. It was followed by: Fringeworthy, the first interdimensional travel RPG; Bureau 13: Stalking the Night Fantastic, a late 20th Century Horror RPG; and FTL:2448, a space RPG. All three were created by Tucholka. Given the more serious tone of these works, the company name was changed from Tacky Tack Games to the more professional-sounding Tri Tac Games in 1983.

In 1994 the Tri Tac offices were raided by the FBI, because of alleged similarities between promotional ID badges distributed by Tri Tac personnel and certain official U.S. government ID badges. After the raid, the federal prosecutor assigned to the case elected not to press charges. A year later the FBI visited the Tri Tac booth at Gen Con 95 to see if Tri Tac was distributing similar ID badges. Tri Tac was no longer selling the badges but they did display one of the controversial badges. It was sealed in a frame with a newspaper report about the raid. The FBI determined Tri Tac presented no threat to national security and left without comment.

After Tucholka's passing in 2017, his wife, Melody Natcher, took over as the owner of Tri Tac Games and has re-released several of the games, some with complete make-overs, such as Hard Wired Hinterland, and others revised just to correct spelling and grammar corrections. Currently the company sells a number of games and books, including a book of cartoons and a cookbook called Damn Strange Recipe Collection.

== Current games ==
Bureau 13

- Bureau 13: Stalking the Night Fantastic
- Bureau 13 Adventures: Hellsnight, Haunts, The Lost Files, Vols 1 & 2
- Bureau 13: Black Powder 1859-1889
- Bureau 13: Scenes for Horror, Industry and Adventure
- Bureau 13: Special Edition by Pollotta & Tucholka
- Bureau 13: d20 edition
- Bureau 13: Screams In The Night (Outpost/Tritac)
- Bureau 13: Aliens Among Us (Outpost/Tritac)
- Bureau 13: Stalking The Steel City (Outpost/Tritac)
- Bureau 13: Extreme
- Bureau 13: Brass & Steam (2012)

Hardwired Hinterland

- Hardwired Hinterland

Fringeworthy

- Fringeworthy
- Fringeworthy d20
- Rogue 417
- Cloisters
- Invasion US
- Weirdzone
- Catalogue of Alternative Worlds
- Catalogue of Alternative Worlds II
- Catalogue of Alternative Worlds III
- Weirdzone

Space RPGs

- FTL:2448
- Incursion II Canadians Across the Galactic Empire
- Incursion
- EZ SPACE 2012

Microgames

- Cosmic Wow!
- Baby Boomer
- Geriatric Wars
- Escape from Westerville State
- Drive By
- War on High
- Viral Vegetable Wars
- The Hunt for Bread in October

Duck Wars

- Duck Trooper
- Polywumpus
- Pterroductyl

Clay squash classics

- Monster Squash
- Mec Squash
- Bug Squash
- Mutant Squash
- Japanese Monster Squash
- Panzer Squash
- People Squash

Other

- Beach Bunny Bimbos with Blasters
- Guests: An Invasion of the Earth Supplement
- Holes: Wild Miniatures Combat
- DM's Book of Nasty Tricks & Misfit Magic
