= Timeline Ltd. =

Game publisher

- Products: The Morrow Project; Time & Time Again; Close & Destroy
- Website: timelineltdcom.godaddysites.com

Timeline Ltd. was an American game company that produced role-playing games and game supplements.

== History ==
Timeline Ltd. published the roleplaying game (RPG), The Morrow Project (1980), and more than a dozen supplements and adventures, including Operation Lucifer (1982), and The Starnaman Incident (1984). They also published the time travel RPG, Time & Time Again (1984), and a single supplement, Holy Warriors (1985).
