= List of United States military books =

Books about the U.S. military or for members of the military.

== General ==
- Classified Secret-Controlling Air Strikes in the Clandestine War in Laos by Jan Churchill
- Code Name Bright Light-US POW Rescue Efforts in the Vietnam War by George J. Veith
- 10,000 Days Of Thunder- A History of the Vietnam War by Philip Caputo
- Fast Movers-Jet Pilots and the Vietnam Experience by John Darrell Sherwood
- In Retrospect: The Tragedy and Lessons of Vietnam by (Former Secretary of Defense) Robert S. McNamara
- Inside the Danger Zone: The U.S. Military in the Persian Gulf 1987-88 by Harold Wise
- One Shot, One Kill- American Combat Snipers: WWII, Korea, Vietnam, Beirut by Charles W. Sasser/Craig Roberts
- Oxford Essential Dictionary of the U.S. Military by Oxford University Press
- Pathfinder: First In, Last Out by Richard R. Burns
- REQUIEM: By The Photographers Who Died In Vietnam and Indochina by Random House
- The Secret War Against Hanoi-Kennedy's and Johnson's use of spies, Saboteurs, and covert warriors in North Vietnam by Richard H. Shultz Jr.
- Stolen Valor: How The Vietnam Generation Was Robbed Of Its Heroes And Its History by B. G. Burkett and Glenna Whitley
- Vietnam Firebases, 1965-1973 by Randy E. M. Foster
- Vietnam Order of Battle by Shelby L. Stanton
- Where We Were In Vietnam: A Comprehensive Guide To The Firebases, Military Installations, and Naval Vessels Of The Vietnam War, 1945-1975 by Michael P. Kelley

== Army ==
- A Bright Shining Lie by Neil Sheehan
- Acceptable Loss-Fighting in Vietnam by Kregg P. Jorgenson
- American Warrior: A Combat Memoir Of Vietnam by John "Doc" Bahansen Jr.
- A Soldier Reports by GEN William C. Westmoreland
- A Hundred Miles of Bad Road by D. W. Birdwell & K. W. Nolan
- The Army and Vietnam by Andrew F. Krepinevich Jr.
- Battle For Hue, Tet 1968 by Keith Nolan
- Bell UH-1 Huey "Slicks" 1962-75 by Chris Bishop
- Black Hawk Down by Mark Bowden
- Chickenhawk by Robert Mason
- Death In The A-Shau Valley, L Company LRRP's Vietnam, 1969-1970 by Larry Chambers
- Death Valley, Summer Offensive, August 1968 by K. W. Nolan
- Dispatches by Michael Herr
- Doc: Platoon Medic by Daniel E. Evans Jr.
- Dustoff-The Memoir of an Army Aviator by Michael J. Novosel
- Eyes Behind The Lines-L Company Rangers in Vietnam 1968 by Gary A. Linderer
- Gunslingers In Action, Cobra-Vietnam by Lou Drendel
- Hamburger Hill, The Brutal Battle For Dong Ap Bia, May 11–20, 1969 by Samuel Zaffiri
- House To House-Playing The Enemy's Game, Saigon, May 1968 by Keith W. Nolan
- If I Die in a Combat Zone, Box Me Up and Ship Me Home by Tim O'Brien
- In Pharaoh's Army: Memoirs of the Lost War by Tobias Wolff
- Into Laos, The Story of Lam Son 719/Dewey Canyon II, 1971 by Keith W. Nolan
- The Killing Zone- My Life In The Vietnam War by Frederick Downs
- Low Level Hell by Hugh Mills
- Mounted Combat In Vietnam by GEN Donn A. Starry
- Recondo: LRRP's In Vietnam by Larry Chambers
- Ringed in Steel: Armored Cavalry, Vietnam 1967-1968 by Michael D. Mahler
- RIPCORD(Firebase), Screaming Eagles Under Siege, Vietnam 1970 by K. W. Nolan
- Rolling Thunder, In A Gentle Land by Andrew Wiest
- Sappers in the Wire - The Life and Death of FIREBASE MARY ANN by Keith W. Nolan
- Snake Pilot: Flying The Cobra Attack Helicopter In Vietnam by Randy R. Zahn
- Six Silent Men- LRRP's In Vietnam by Kenn Miller
- SOG: The Secret Wars of America's Commandos by John Plaster
- Tanks in the Wire! - The First Use Of Enemy Armor In Vietnam by David B. Stockwell
- The 13th Valley, by John M. DelVecchio
- Tank Sergeant-1/69th Armor, Vietnam by Ralph Zumbro
- They Marched Into Sunlight: War and Peace, Vietnam and America, October 1967 by David Maraniss
- Thunderbolt: General Creighton Abrams and the Army of His Time by Lewis Sorley
- To The Limit- An Air Cavalry Pilot In The Vietnam War by Tom A. Johnson
- The Tunnels Of Cu Chi by Tom Mangold
- Through The Valley, Vietnam, 1967-1968 by James F. Humphries
- US Army AH-1 Cobra Units in Vietnam by Johnathon Bernstein
- US Infantry, Vietnam by Jim Mesko
- Vietnam Choppers, Helicopters In Battle 1950-1975 by Simon Dunstan
- Vietnam Airmobile Warfare Tactics by Bruce B. G. Clarke
- Westmoreland: A Biography of General William Westmoreland by Samuel Zaffiri
- We Served In Silence by author Glenn K. Fannin Jr. A Vietnam war novel relating the activities of the Army Security Agency. Recently categorized as Unclassified by the NSA.
- We Were Soldiers Once… And Young: Ia Drang—The Battle That Changed The War In Vietnam by LTG Harold G. Moore

== Navy ==
- A-6 Intruders In Vietnam by Jesse Randall
- AD Skyraider-In Detail & Scale by Bert Kinzey
- The Bluejacket's Manual by Thomas J. Cutler
- Brown Water, Black Berets-Coastal and Riverine Warfare In Vietnam by Thomas J. Cutler LCDR USN
- Confession To A Deaf God- Memoir Of A Mekong River Rat by Gary R. Blinn
- Crusader! Last of the Gunfighters by Rear Admiral Paul T. Gillcrist
- Douglas A-1 Skyraider-Warbird Tech V13-Revised by Larry Davis
- Douglas A-1 Skyraider by Robert F. Dorr
- Douglas A-4 Skyhawk by Peter Kilduff
- F-8 Crusader In Detail & Scale by Bert Kinzey
- F-8 Crusader Units of the Vietnam War by Peter Mersky
- F-8 Crusader In Action by Jim Sullivan
- First SEAL, by Lieutenant Commander Roy Boehm & Charles Sasser
- Fox Two- The Story Of America's First Ace In Vietnam by R. Cunningham/Jeffrey Ethell
- Gray Ghosts-US Navy and Marine Corps Phantoms by Peter E. Davies
- In the Shadow of Greatness by USNA Class of 2002
- Inside the Danger Zone: The U.S. Military in the Persian Gulf 1987-88 by Harold Wise
- Launch The Intruders: A Naval Attack Squadron In The Vietnam War 1972 by Carol Reardon
- McDonnell Douglas A-4 Skyhawk By Brad Elward
- One Perfect Op: An Insider's Account of the Navy SEAL Special Warfare Teams, by Master Chief Dennis "Snake" Chalker & Kevin Dockery
- On Yankee Station- The Naval Air War Over Vietnam by CDR John B. Nichols
- Point Man, by Chief James "Patches" Watson & Kevin Dockery
- The Real Team, By Commander Richard Marcinko & ten SEAL Team 6 veterans
- Riverine- A Pictorial History of the Brown Water War In Vietnam by Jim Mesko
- River Rats by Ralph Christopher
- Rogue Warrior, by Commander Richard Marcinko & John Weisman
- Stop and Search - A novel of small boat warfare off Vietnam (1969) by W. E. Butterworth
- Swift Boat Down-The Real Story Of The Sinking Of PCF-19 by James Steffes, ENC Retired
- The Vietnam Brown Water Navy 1965-1969 by Gordon L. Rottman
- Topgun Days by Dave "Bio" Baranek
- Tour of Duty- (Senator) John Kerry and the Vietnam War by Douglas Brinkley
- Vietnam-The Naval Story by Frank Uhlig Jr.
- US Navy F-4 Phantom II MIG KILLERS 1972-1973 by Brad Elward/Peter E. Davies
- US Small Combatants-From PT Boats to the Brown Water Navy by Norman Friedman
- War On The Rivers-A Swift Boat Sailor's Chronicle Of The Battle For The Mekong Delta by Weymouth D. Symmes

== Marine Corps ==
- A Sniper In The Arizona, 2/5th Marines in the Arizona Territory 1967 by John J. Culbertson
- Ambush Valley: I Corps Vietnam 1967-A Marine Battalion's Battle For Survival by Eric Hammel
- 13 Cent Killers: The 5th Marine Snipers in Vietnam by John Culbertson
- Basrah, Baghdad, and Beyond: U.S. Marine Corps in the Second Iraq War by N.E. Reynolds
- Battle Cry, by Leon Uris
- Bloody Tarawa by Eric Hammel and John E. Lane
- Boot by Daniel Da Cruz
- Born on the Fourth of July by Ron Kovic
- Breakout by Martin Russ
- The Bridge at Dong Ha by John Grider Miller
- Chesty: The Story of Lieutenant General Lewis B. Puller, USMC by Jon T. Hoffman
- Corps Business: The 30 Management Principles of the U.S. Marines by David H. Freedman
- Dauntless Marine - Joseph Sailer Jr., Dive Bombing Ace of Guadalcanal by Alexander S. White
- Dear Mom: A Sniper's Vietnam - Joseph T. Ward
- Devilbirds by John A. De Chant
- Dog Company Six by Edwin Howard Simmons
- Expendable Warriors: The Battle For Khe Sanh by Bruce B. G. Clarke
- Fields of Fire by James Webb
- First to Fight: An Inside View of the U.S. Marine Corps by Victor H.Krulak
- Flags of Our Fathers by James Bradley
- Flying Leathernecks by Richard G. Hubler & John A. De Chant
- Fortunate Son: The Autobiography of Lewis B. Puller, Jr. by Lewis Puller Jr.
- Generation Kill by Evan Wright
- Gray Ghosts - US Navy and Marine Corps Phantoms by Peter E. Davies
- Guadalcanal - The Definitive Account of the Landmark battle by Richard B. Frank
- Guidebook for Marines, by the staff of the Marine Corps Association
- HOGs in the Shadows - Combat Stories from Marine Snipers in Iraq by Milo S. Afong
- History of Marine Corps Aviation in World War II by Robert Sherrod
- Hill 488 by Ray Hildreth/Charles W. Sassar
- Hold High the Torch - A History of the 4th Marines by Kenneth W. Conduit & Edwin T. Turnbladh
- "I'm Staying with My Boys..." The Heroic Life of Sgt. John Basilone, USMC by Jim Proser
- In the Shadow of Greatness by USNA Class of 2002
- Images of America - Camp Pendleton by Thomas O'Hara
- Iwo Jima - Portraits of a Battle by Eric Hammel
- Jarhead: A Marine's Chronicle of the Gulf War and Other Battles by Anthony Swofford
- The Journal of Patrick Seamus Flaherty: United States Marine Corps, Khe Sanh 1968 by Ellen Emerson White
- Making the Corps, by Thomas E. Ricks
- Marine: A Guided Tour of a Marine Expeditionary Unit by Tom Clancy
- Marine Fighting Squadron Nine (VF-9M) by Jess C. Barrow
- Marine Rifleman: Forty-Three Years in the Corps by Wesley Fox
- The Marine Officer's Guide by Kenneth W. Estes
- Marine Sniper - 93 Confirmed Kills-Carlos Hathcock, Vietnam by Charles W. Henderson
- Mongoose in the Sand by Ron Godby
- No Bended Knee : The Battle for Guadalcanal by Merrill B. Twining, Neil G. Carey (Editor)
- No True Glory: a Frontline Account of the Battle of Fallujah, by Bing West
- One Bullet Away: The Making of a Marine Officer by Nathaniel C. Fick
- Operation Buffalo: USMC Fight for the DMZ by Keith William Nolan
- Operation Tuscaloosa-2/5th Marines at An Hon, 1967 by John J. Culbertson
- Phase Line GREEN, The Battle For Hue, 1968 by Nicholas Warr
- A Rumor Of War-Marines In Vietnam by Philip Caputo
- Semper Fi in the Sky - The Marine Air Battles of World War II by Gerald Astor
- Semper Fidelis - The History of the United States Marine Corps by Allan Millett
- Semper Fi: Vietnam by Edward F. Murphy
- Stay off the Skyline - The Sixth Marine Division on Okinawa by Laura Homan Lacey
- The Highway War - A Marine Company Commander in Iraq by Seth Folsom
- The March Up: Taking Baghdad with the 1st Marine Division by Ray L. Smith & Bing West
- The U.S. Marine Corps Story by J. Robert Moskin
- The U.S. Marine Corps: An Illustrated History by Merrill L. Bartlett
- The Village by Bing West
- Uncommon Men: The Sergeants Major of the Marine Corps by Alfred M. Gray
- United States Marine Corps Air Stations of World War II by M.L. Shettle
- United States Marine Corps Aviation Squadron Lineage, Insignia and History Volume 1 by Michael J. Crowler
- U.S. Marine Corps Aviation - 1912 to Present by Peter Mersky
- U.S. Marine Corps Aviation Unit Insignia 1941 - 1946 by Jeff Millstein
- USMC: A Complete History by Jon T. Hoffman
- US Marines In Vietnam 1965-1973 by Charles D. Melson
- US Marine Corps Tank Crewman 1965-1970 Vietnam by Oscar Gilbert
- The Walking Dead: A Marine's Story of Vietnam by Charles W. Sasser/Craig Roberts
- The War That Would Not End-US Marines In Vietnam by Charles D. Melson
- Warlord - No Better Friend, No Worse Enemy - Ilario Pantano
- Warrior Culture of the U.S. Marines by Marion F. Sturkey
- Shoulder to Shoulder with the Marines Who Took Fallujah by Patrick K. O'Donnell
- With the Old Breed by E.B. Sledge

== Air Force ==
- Aces and Aerial Victories-USAF In Southeast Asia 1965-1973 by R. Frank Futrell
- Air War Hanoi by Robert F. Dorr
- A Code To Keep by Ernie Brace
- And Kill Migs by Lou Drendel
- Bury Us Upside Down- The Misty Pilots And The Secret Battle For The Ho Chi Minh Trail by Rick Newman
- Clashes-Air Combat Over North Vietnam 1965-1972 by Marshall L. Michel
- Code Of Honor by Lt Col John A. Dramesi
- Check Six- A Fighter Pilot Looks Back by Maj Gen F. C. Blesse
- Convair F-102 Delta Dagger-A Photo Chronicle by Wayne Mutza
- Development and Employment of Fixed-wing Gunships 1962-1972 by Frederick Shaw/Timothy Warnock
- The Eleven Days of Christmas: America's Last Vietnam Battle (B-52's Maximum Effort) by Marshall L. Michael
- First In, Last Out: Stories By The Wild Weasels In Vietnam by Edward T. Rock
- F-4C, F-4D, & RF-4C Phantom II In Detail & Scale by Bert Kinzey
- F-100 Super Sabre: In Action by Larry Davis
- F-105 Thunderchief: Walk Around by Ken Neubeck
- F-105 Thunderchief: In Action by Ken Neubeck
- Hit My Smoke! Forward Air Controllers in Southeast Asia by Jan Churchill
- Journey Into Darkness-The Story of a (F-104) Starfighter Pilot in Vietnam by Col Philip E. Smith/Peggy Herz
- The Linebacker Raids-The Bombing of North Vietnam, 1972 by John T. Smith
- Linebacker II - A Strategic and Tactical Case Study by Lt Col Leonard D. G. Teixeira
- Lockheed F-104 Starfighter by Jim Upton
- Lockheed F-104 Starfighter by Martin Bowman
- Lockheed SR-71-The Secret Missions Exposed by Paul F. Crickmore
- Lockheed's SR-71 "BlackBird" Family, A-12, F-12, D-21, SR-71 by James C. Goodall
- Lockheed SR-71 Blackbird by Steve Pace
- Lockheed U-2 Dragon Lady by Dennis Jenkins
- The Lovable One-Niner- A Complete History of the Cessna L-19 Bird Dog by Minard D. Thompson
- McDonnell Douglas F-4 Gun Nosed Phantoms by Kris Hughes, Walter Dranem
- Magic 100- An F-105 Fighter Pilot's 100 Combat Missions In Vietnam by Brig Gen Al Lenski
- Martin B-57 Canberra- The Complete Record by Robert C. Mikesh
- McDonnell F-101 Voodoo by Robert F. Dorr
- 100 Missions North by Kenneth H. Bell
- North American F-100 Super Sabre by Peter E. Davies
- North American F-100 Supersabre by David A. Anderton
- Once a Fighter Pilot by Brig Gen Jerry W. Cook
- One Day Too Long-Top Secret Site 85 and the Bombing of North Vietnam by Timothy N. Castle
- One Day in a Long War. May 10, 1972, Air War, North Vietnam by Jeffrey Ethell
- Over The Beach-The Air War In Vietnam by Zalin Grant
- Palace Cobra-A Fighter Pilot In The Vietnam Air War by Ed Rasimus
- Pak Six-A Story of the War in the Skies of North Vietnam by Gene I. Basel
- The Phantom Story by Anthony M. Thornborough and Peter E. Davies
- The Rescue of BAT-21 by Darrel D. Whitcomb
- Republic F-105 Thunderchief by David Anderton
- Republic F-105 Thunderchief by Larry Davis/David Menard
- Rolling Thunder by John T. Smith
- Roll Call: Thud-A photographic Record of the F-105 Thunderchief by J. M. Campbell/M. Hill
- SAC Tanker Operations in the Southeast Asia War by Charles K. Hopkins
- SR-71 Blackbird: Stories, Tales, and Legends by Rich Graham
- SR-71 Revealed: The Inside Story by Rich Graham
- Thunderchief: The Right Stuff and How Fighter Pilots Get It by Don Henry
- Thud Ridge- F-105 Thunderchief Missions Over Vietnam by Jack Broughton
- USAF F-4 Phantom II MIG KILLERS 1965-1968 by Peter E. Davies
- Walk Around: SR-71 Blackbird by James C. Goodall
- When Thunder Rolled-An F-105 Pilot Over North Vietnam by Ed Rasimus
- Wild Weasel- The SAM Suppression Story by Larry Davis
- Wolfpack-Hunting MiG's Over North Vietnam by Jerry Scutts
- War For The Hell Of It: A Fighter Pilot's View Of Vietnam by Ed Cobleigh
- Yeager: An Autobiography by Brig Gen Chuck Yeager
