= FDD's Long War Journal =

US news website on the war on terror

- Website type: Intelligence
- Available in: English
- Owners: Public Multimedia, Inc.
- Creators: Bill Roggio; Paul Hanusz
- Website: www.longwarjournal.org
- Commercial: No
- Launched: 2007
- Current status: Online

FDD's Long War Journal (LWJ) is an American news website, also described as a blog, which reports on the war on terror. The site is operated by Public Multimedia Incorporated (PMI), a non-profit media organization established in 2007. PMI is run by Paul Hanusz and Bill Roggio. Roggio is the managing editor of the journal. The site is a project of the Foundation for Defense of Democracies, where Roggio is a senior fellow.

The journal evolved from Roggio's blog with which he reported on conflicts involving terrorism and Islamic insurgencies around the world. PMI states that its journal seeks to provide news on conflicts without promoting a political agenda and to provide in-depth, contextual detailed reporting.

The site's staff, led by Roggio, use international media sources plus contacts in the United States intelligence community for information for their reports.

The organization is funded by private donations, sponsorships, and grants. As of 2011, the site received an estimated average of 12,000 views a day. FDD's Long War Journal has been used as a source by a number of large, mass media organizations. The journal's reporting has included stories on insurgent and terrorist activities in Pakistan.

== History and mission ==
FDD's Long War Journal began as Roggio's personal blog, BillRoggio.com, in which he provided detailed reporting on conflicts around the world using information obtained from media and internet sources plus information given him by contacts in the United States intelligence community. Hanusz, a regular reader and financial contributor to Roggio's blog, had the idea of organizing Roggio's reporting into a nonprofit journalism organization along the lines of the Center for Public Integrity. Thus, in 2007, Roggio and Hanusz left their full-time jobs and created PMI as a non-profit corporation with the goal, according to the Columbia Journalism Review, "to develop a first-of-its-kind media entity made up of independent reporters, at home and abroad, dedicated solely to reporting on terrorism, so-called small wars, and counterterrorism efforts around the world, to do it in the kind of fine-grained detail that the mainstream press never will, and, as much as possible, without an overt partisan bent."

Roggio and the Long War Journal's staff use reports from various media organizations, including publications in countries where terrorists or Islamic insurgencies are active, such as in Afghanistan and Pakistan, then amplify and add historical context to what they find with information from their own network of US intelligence sources. In some cases, PMI has funded trips by its own media-credentialed journalists to report on war zones such as Afghanistan, Iraq, and the Philippines. Roggio, a former United States Army signalman and infantryman, uses his military experience to add strategic, operational, and tactical level context to the journal's reports. According to the Columbia Journalism Review, "Roggio's greatest service, then, may be the way he picks up where the mainstream press leaves off, giving readers a simultaneously more specific and holistic understanding of the battlefield."

The Columbia Journalism Review reports that the Long War Journal for the most part avoids political bias in its stories. The Review, however, noted that Roggio has at times aligned himself with conservative bloggers on issues such as the "Easongate" controversy. The journal states that it is a publication of the Foundation for Defense of Democracies, which describes itself as non-partisan but has been called "neoconservative" by various resources.

In 2006, before the establishment of the Journal, Huffington Post commentator Stephen Kaus criticized Roggio after Roggio complained about The Washington Post's negative coverage of his 2005 trip to Iraq as an embedded reporter with the United States Marine Corps. Kaus criticized Roggio as a sensationalist who likes to get people to read his articles by distorting the news. Kaus later added, however, that "I should make clear that Roggio's reporting and blogging make a valuable contribution and I take my hat off to his courage. It is the attacks on the Post that are unwarranted."

== Staff and funding ==
As of 2013, PMI's editorial board includes Roggio (managing editor) and four senior and associate editors. Reporters work on a part-time or voluntary basis. The organization has employed up to 16 reporters at various times, including sending them on field reporting trips to Iraq, Afghanistan, and the Philippines.

Reader donations help finance PMI, which also seeks financial assistance through corporate sponsorships, foundation grants, and content-distribution deals. The organization does not release details on its finances.

== Traffic and use ==
The Las Vegas Review-Journal reported in November 2007 that FDD's Long War Journal was getting between 10,000 and 20,000 views each day. In 2008, the Columbia Journalism Review reported that FDD's Long War Journal website was receiving about 6,000 daily visitors.

As of June 2011, the site ranked 91,493 on Alexa. The site's rank in the United States was 25,177 and 20,141 in Pakistan. According to Alexa, 984 other sites linked to FDD's Long War Journal's site.

Quantcast, in June 2011, estimated that the site received an average of 12,000 visitors a day for the preceding one-year period. According to Quantcast estimation, 67% of the site's visitors are male, 84% are caucasian, and 67% are attending or have graduated from college.

FDD's Long War Journal has been used as a source by media organizations or quoted in press publications including The New York Times (two of which were on the newspaper's front page), Reuters, Associated Press, United Press International, Sunday Times, The Hindu, Cable News Network, the Times of India, The Australian, CTC Sentinel, Time, The Nation, The Washington Times, and The Atlantic. Marc Thiessen used the journal as a source in a March 15, 2011 opinion piece for The Washington Post. Pulitzer Prize-winning reporter Thomas E. Ricks cited FDD's Long War Journal reporter Nathan Webster in Ricks' Iraq-related book, The Gamble.

== Reports ==
In December 2007 the journal reported, with accompanying graphics and maps, on supply routes for weapons and supplies from Iran to insurgents in Iraq. The story was ignored by the mainstream press.

FDD's Long War Journal predicted nine months in advance that the government of Pakistan would make a truce with the Taliban of North Waziristan. The journal also was among the first, before most mainstream media, to report on Al Qaeda training camps in Pakistan and the conflict between militants in those areas and the Pakistani military. In addition, the journal has reported on the relationship between the Pakistani government and military and the Haqqani network.

== Controversies ==
After Baitullah Mehsud was killed in August 2009, Roggio claimed on August 6, 2009, that a US intelligence official told him US officials thought Mehsud was still alive. This claim about Mehsud's fate was not accurate, as Pentagon spokesman Jeff Morrell and National Security Advisor James Jones claimed that US officials were 90% certain he was killed and they had yet to see any evidence to assume otherwise, and the Pakistan Taliban later confirmed he was killed.

In April 2009, Roggio claimed Rashid Rauf, an Al Qaeda operative who was reported to have been killed in a US drone strike which took place in North Waziristan on November 22, 2008, was still alive. This claim about Rauf's fate was never proven to be true and in July 2010, a U.S. counterterrorism official told the Daily News that Rauf was killed in the drone strike. In October 2012. Rauf's family confirmed he was killed in a drone strike.

In September 2010, Thomas Joscelyn falsely claimed that Iran had released al-Qaeda spokesman Sulaiman Abu Ghaith. In reality, Abu Ghaith was still under house arrest and was not released until 2013. Abu Ghaith was subsequently captured in Turkey, deported to Jordan and handed over to U.S. law enforcement.

After Osama bin Laden was killed in May 2011, Roggio claimed that his son Sa'ad, who was believed to have been killed in a drone strike in 2009, was one of his possible successors. At this time, Roggio gave no mention to the earlier report about Sa'ad's death and stated that Sa'ad "is considered a senior leader and an operational commander in al Qaeda" and that "he is known to shelter in Iran and to move back and forth across the Iranian border with Pakistan." A letter captured from the compound in Abbottabad, Pakistan where Osama was killed also discussed Sa'ad's death. In September 2012, al-Qaeda leader Ayman al-Zawahiri confirmed in a video message that Saad was killed in a drone strike.

In March 2012, Roggio echoed claims by the Daily Times that Ilyas Kashmiri was still alive and was spotted in a meeting with Pakistan Taliban leader Hakimullah Mehsud in North Waziristan. However, the accuracy of this report was disputed because journalists were unable to access the region where Kashmiri was allegedly spotted. A few days later, the report of Kashmiri's survival was further contradicted when an Al Qaeda spokesman eulogized him along with other Pakistani militants who had been killed in various drone strikes.
