= Bill Roggio =

American military commentator

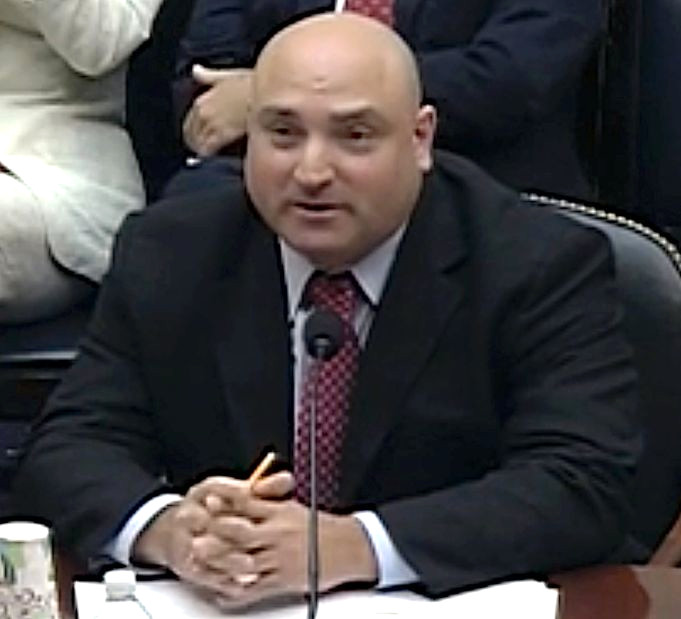
- Roggio testifies before the House Foreign Affairs Committee in 2016
- Occupations: Journalist, blogger

Bill Roggio is an American commentator on military affairs, and the managing editor of The Long War Journal. Prior to leading a team of online commentators, Roggio published the online weblog The Fourth Rail. He is a senior fellow at the Foundation for Defense of Democracies.

== Military service ==
Roggio was an active duty soldier in the United States Army in the 1990s. From 1991 to 1997, Roggio served in the United States Army and the New Jersey National Guard as a signalman and infantryman. He uses his military experience to add strategic, operational, and tactical level context to the journal's reports. According to the Columbia Journalism Review, "Roggio's greatest service, then, may be the way he picks up where the mainstream press leaves off, giving readers a simultaneously more specific and holistic understanding of the battlefield."

== Long War Journal ==
The Long War Journal began as Roggio's personal blog, BillRoggio.com, in which he provided detailed reporting on conflicts around the world using information obtained from media and internet sources plus information given him by contacts in the United States intelligence community. Paul Hanusz, a regular reader and financial contributor to Roggio's blog, had the idea of organizing Roggio's reporting into a nonprofit journalism organization along the lines of the Center for Public Integrity. Thus, in 2007, Roggio and Hanusz left their full-time jobs and created PMI as a non-profit corporation with the goal, according to the Columbia Journalism Review, "to develop a first-of-its-kind media entity made up of independent reporters, at home and abroad, dedicated solely to reporting on terrorism, so-called small wars, and counterterrorism efforts around the world, to do it in the kind of fine-grained detail that the mainstream press never will, and, as much as possible, without an overt partisan bent."

Roggio and the Long War Journal's staff use reports from media organizations, including publications in countries where terrorists or Islamic insurgencies are active, such as in Afghanistan and Pakistan, then amplify and add historical context to what they find with information from their own network of US intelligence sources. In some cases, PMI has funded trips by its own media-credentialed journalists to report on war zones such as Afghanistan, Iraq, and the Philippines.

The Columbia Journalism Review reports that the Long War Journal for the most part avoids political bias in its stories. The Review, however, noted that Roggio has at times aligned himself with conservative bloggers on issues such as the "Easongate" controversy. The journal states that it is a publication of the Foundation for Defense of Democracies, which describes itself as non-partisan but has been called "neoconservative" by various resources.

The Long War Journal has been used as a source by media organizations or quoted in press publications including The New York Times (two of which were on the newspaper's front page), Reuters, Associated Press, United Press International, Sunday Times, The Hindu, Cable News Network, the Times of India, The Australian, CTC Sentinel, Time, The Nation, Washington Times, and The Atlantic. Marc Thiessen used the journal as a source in a 15 March 2011 opinion piece for the Washington Post. Pulitzer Prize-winning reporter Thomas E. Ricks cited Long War Journal reporter Nathan Webster in Ricks' Iraq-related book, The Gamble.

== Disputed claims ==
In 2006, before the establishment of the Journal, Huffington Post commentator Stephen Kaus criticized Roggio after Roggio complained about The Washington Post's negative coverage of his 2005 trip to Iraq as an embedded reporter with the United States Marine Corps. Kaus criticized Roggio as a sensationalist who likes to get people to read his articles by distorting the news.

After Baitullah Mehsud was killed in August 2009, Roggio claimed on August 6, 2009, that a US intelligence official told him US officials thought Mehsud was still alive. This claim about Mehsud's fate was not accurate, as Pentagon spokesman Jeff Morrell and National Security Advisor James Jones claimed that US officials were 90% certain he was killed and they had yet to see any evidence to assume otherwise, which was later confirmed by the Pakistan Taliban.

In April 2009, Roggio claimed Rashid Rauf, an Al Qaeda operative who was reported to have been killed in a US drone strike which took place in North Waziristan on November 22, 2008, was still alive. This claim about Rauf's fate was never proven to be true and in July 2010, a U.S. counterterrorism official told the New York Daily News that Rauf was killed in the drone strike. In October 2012, Rauf's family confirmed he was killed in the drone strike.

After Osama bin Laden was killed in May 2011, Roggio claimed that his son Sa'ad, who was believed to have killed in a drone strike in 2009, was one of his possible successors. At this time, Roggio gave no mention to the earlier report about Sa'ad's death and stated that Sa'ad "is considered a senior leader and an operational commander in al Qaeda" and that "he is known to shelter in Iran and to move back and forth across the Iranian border with Pakistan." A letter captured from the compound in Abbottabad, Pakistan where Osama was killed also discussed Sa'ad's death. In September 2012, al-Qaeda leader Ayman al-Zawahiri confirmed in a video message that Saad was killed in the drone strike.

In March 2012, Roggio echoed claims by the Daily Times that Ilyas Kashmiri was still alive and was spotted in a meeting with Pakistan Taliban leader Hakimullah Mehsud in North Waziristan. However, the accuracy of this report was disputed because journalists were unable to access the region where Kashmiri was allegedly spotted. A few days later, the report of Kashmiri's survival was further contradicted when an Al Qaeda spokesman eulogized him along with other Pakistani militants who had been killed in various drone strikes.
