= Reef points =

Reef points may refer to:

- A rope or strap used to secure the reefed portion of a sail
- The midshipman handbook of the United States Naval Academy
