= Harold Wise =

Harold Wise may refer to:

- Harold E. Wise, American football coach
- Harold Lee Wise, American naval historian
