= James S. Olson =

American historian and author

James Stuart Olson is an American academic and Pulitzer Prize-nominated author. In 1994, he was appointed Distinguished Professor of History at Sam Houston State University in Huntsville, Texas.

Olson is the author or co-author of over thirty books, primarily non-fiction, and usually in the field of history. His most recent book was Bathsheba’s Breast: Women, Cancer, and History, which won the 2002 History of Science Category Award from the Association of American Publishers. Olson wrote the book while suffering a malignant growth which resulted in the amputation of his hand. The book was recognized by the Los Angeles Times as one of the best non-fiction books in America for 2002. In November 2008, Olson was honored by his alma mater, Brigham Young University, with its Distinguished Alumni Service Award.

== Education ==
B.A., Brigham Young University
M.A., Ph.D., The State University of New York at Stony Brook

== Works ==
- Native Americans in the Twentieth Century (Brigham Young University Press)
- Slave Life in America: A Historiography and Selected Bibliography (University Press of America)
- The Ethnic Dimension in American History (St. Martin's Press);
- Saving Capitalism: The Reconstruction Finance Corporation and the New Deal, 1933-1940 (Princeton University Press);
- Catholic Immigrants in America (Nelson-Hall);
- Winning is the Only Thing: Sports in America Since 1945 (The Johns Hopkins University Press);
- Where the Domino Fell: America and Vietnam, 1945 to 1990
- An Ethnohistorical Dictionary of China. Westport, Conn: Greenwood Press. 1998. ISBN 0-313-28853-4.
- etc.

== Students ==
Harold Lee Wise – author of Inside the Danger Zone: The U.S. Military in the Persian Gulf, 1987–1988 (Naval Institute Press, 2007)
