= United States Naval Academy Induction Day =

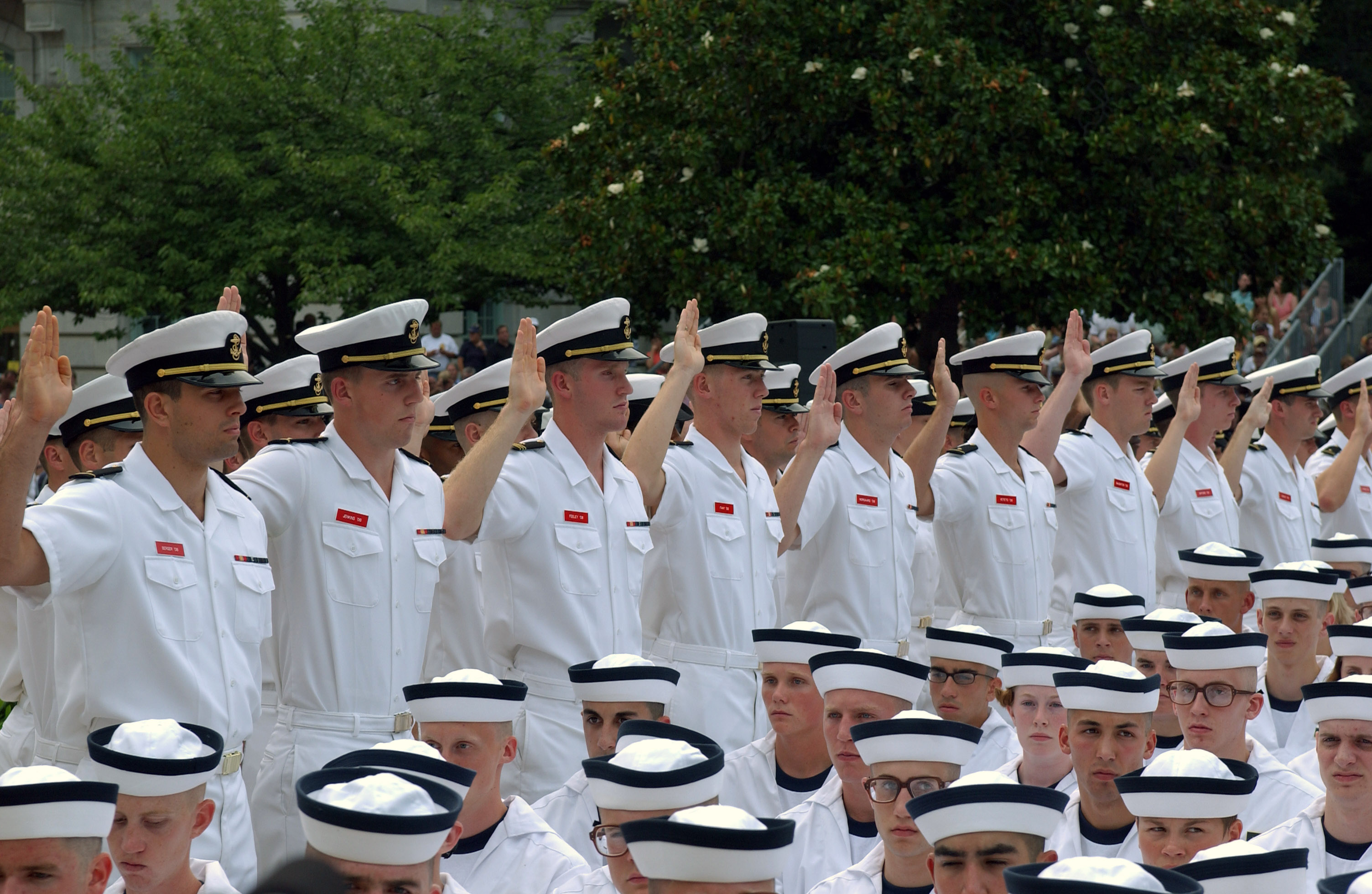
Upper-class midshipmen from the U.S. Naval Academy recite the "Oath of Leadership", on Induction Day for the Class of 2011.

Induction Day or I-Day is the official name for the first day of Plebe Summer at the United States Naval Academy. Typically held in late June or early July, this is the day on which the members of the newest Naval Academy class arrive in Annapolis; for most, it is also their first day in the military.

== Typical events ==
Induction Day activities take place in various locations across campus, with each shift in locale corresponding to a new phase.

=== Alumni Hall ===
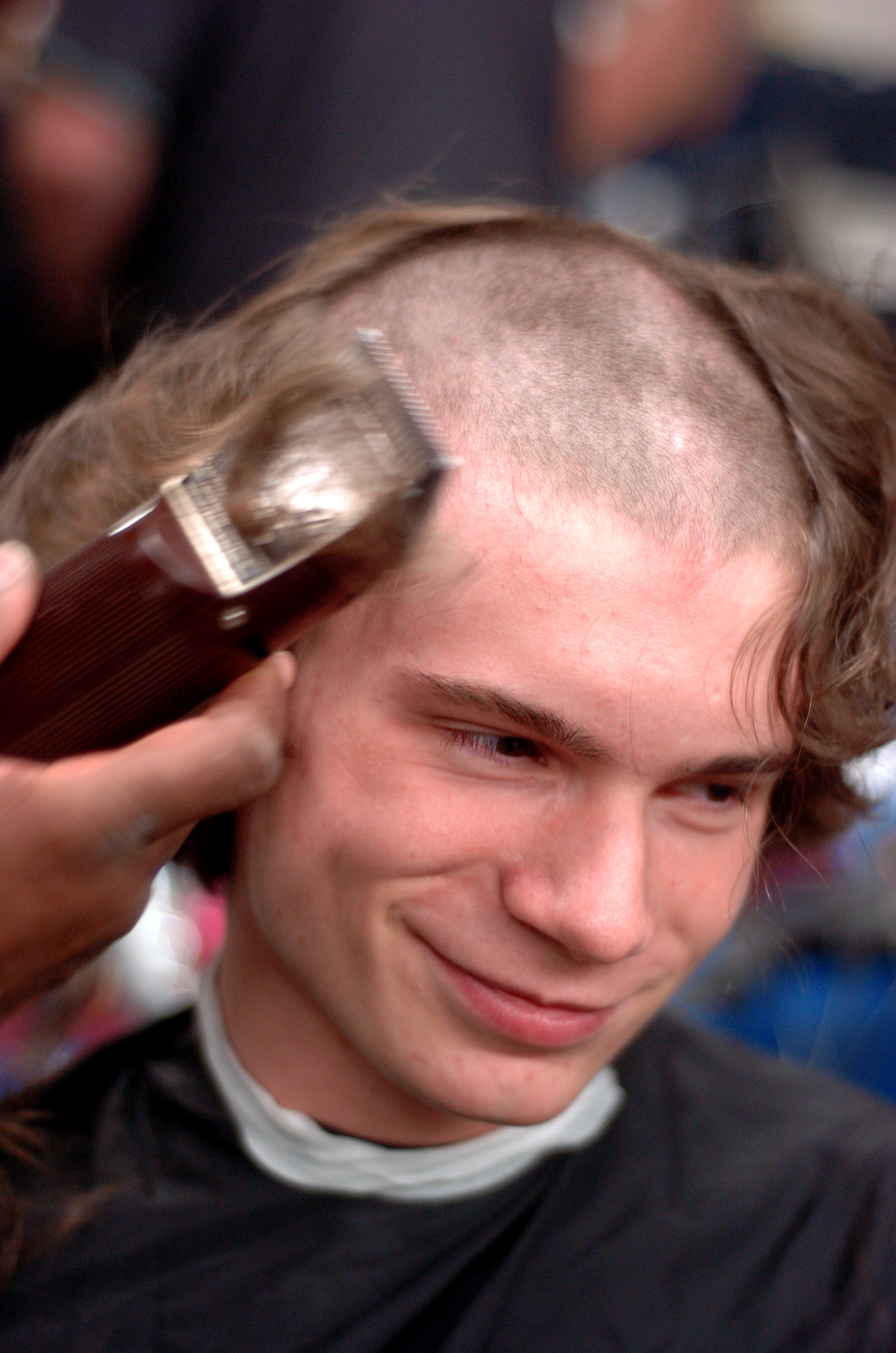
A prospective midshipman receives his first military haircut.

Prospective midshipmen begin the day by reporting to Alumni Hall, the Naval Academy Midshipman Activities Center, where they are welcomed to the Navy by command chaplain staff. Immediately afterward, the new midshipmen receive their first orders, which are given quickly and sternly. Invariably, these are "From now on the first and last words out of your mouth will be 'Sir' or 'Ma'am'. Do you understand?" Midshipmen then surrender any civilian clothing or belongings they have brought with them and are sent to a makeshift barbershop for a haircut.

All new male midshipmen have their heads shaved. They are sent for a medical screening, where blood and drug-test urine samples are collected, a Breathalyzer screening for alcohol is administered, and vaccinations are given. They are also examined for tattoos and piercings; the midshipman can be dismissed from the academy if any do not receive the approval of a senior officer.

Midshipmen are fitted for their new uniforms and issued much of their necessary equipment, such as professional publications and field gear, which is sent by truck to the midshipman dormitory.

The new midshipmen complete administrative paperwork, including arranging bank accounts and paycheck allotments, authorizing the loan for issued supplies, starting Servicemen's Group Life Insurance, and various other administrative items.

Before midshipmen depart Alumni Hall, they receive their first introduction to the academy's Honor System and are taught basic military courtesies, such as saluting.

=== Bancroft Hall ===
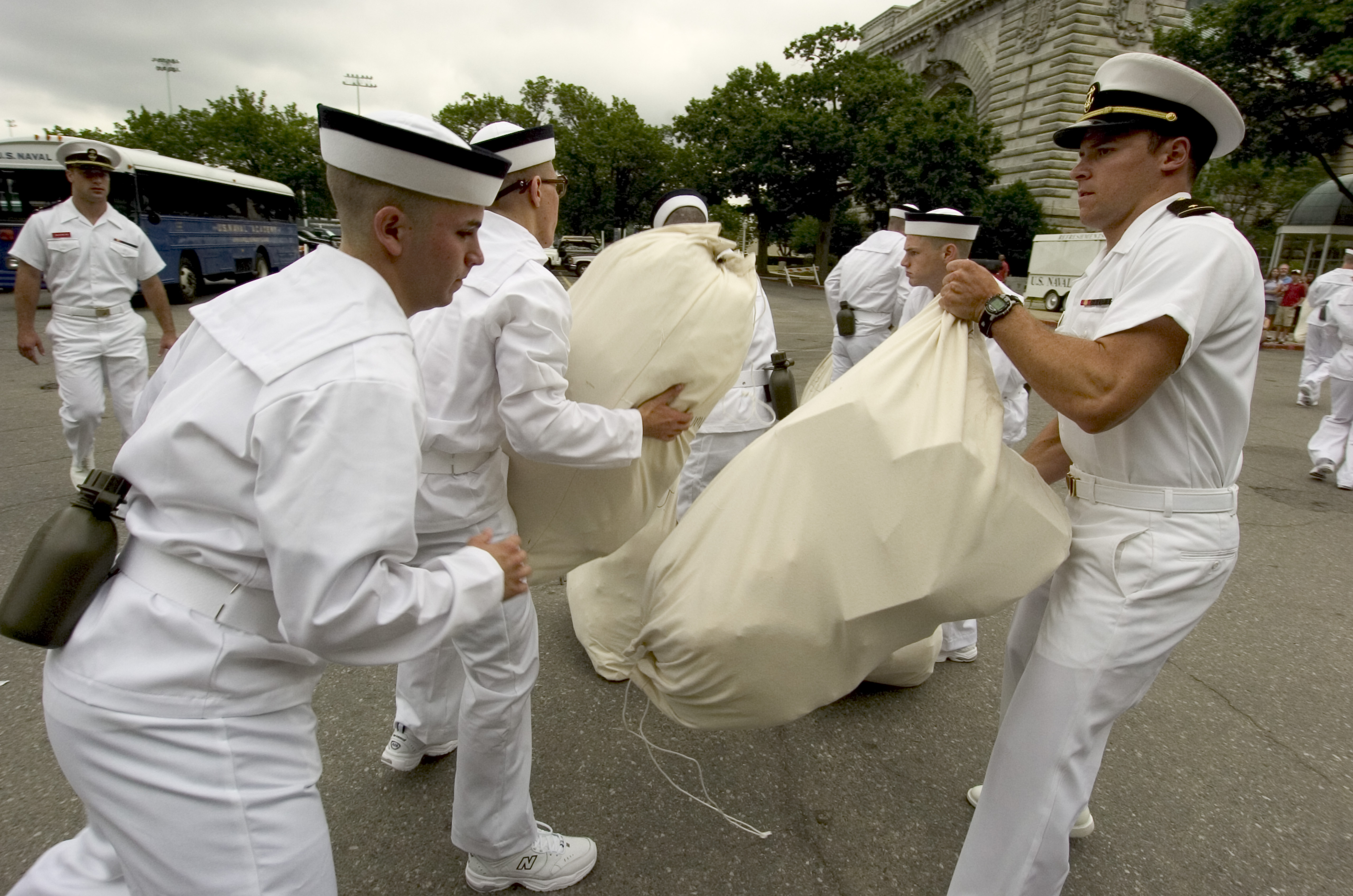
Prospective midshipmen retrieve their sea bags before entering Bancroft Hall

The midshipmen are next transported by bus to the midshipman dormitory, Bancroft Hall, where they meet their Plebe Summer Cadre and must transport their new gear and uniforms to their dorm rooms. They are shown how to mark and stow all equipment and spend considerable time arranging their rooms appropriately. Midshipmen must also formally sign their "Oath of Office" papers, which commit them to naval service.

=== T-Court ===
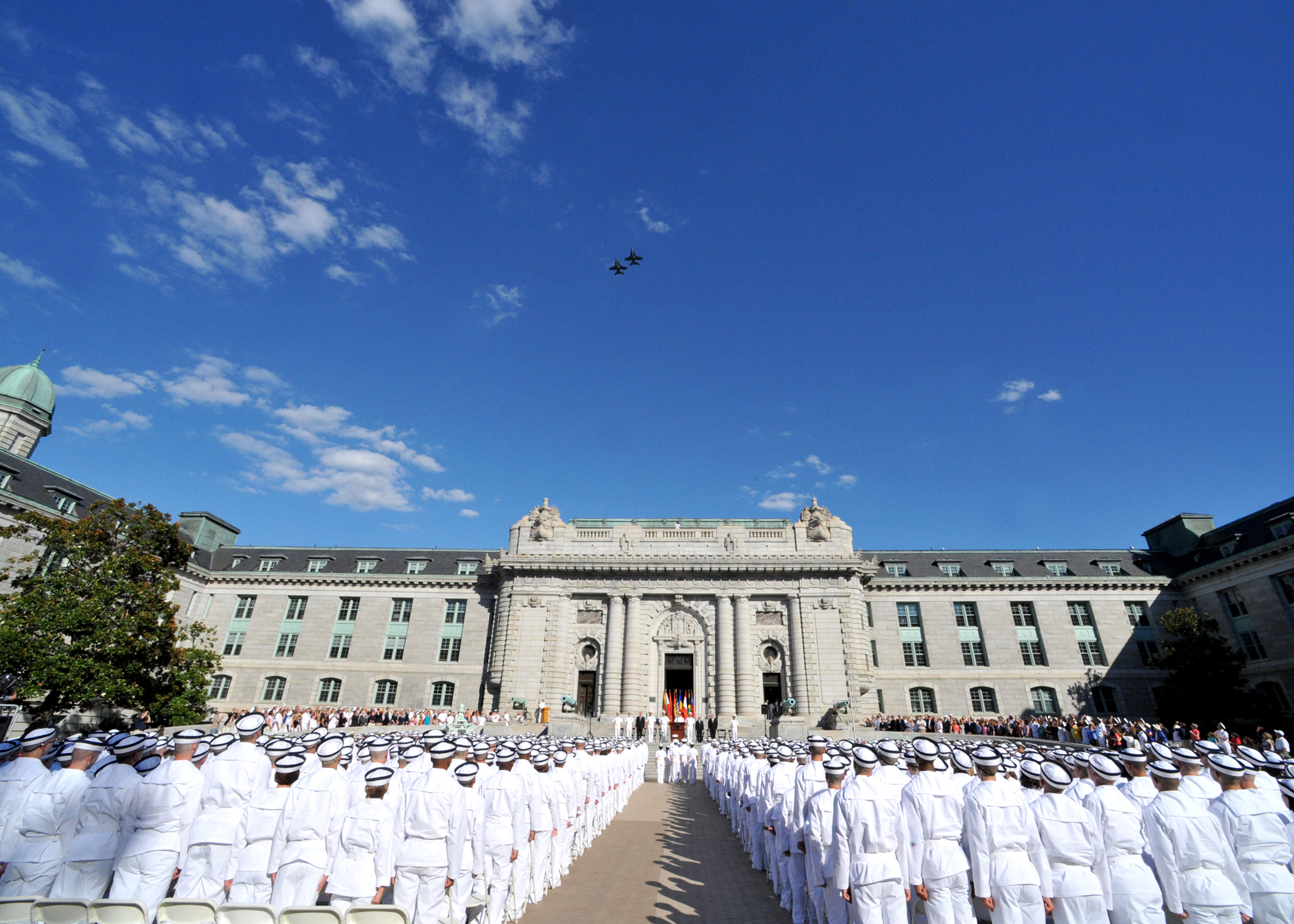
Oath of Office ceremony at T-Court in 2010

After lunch, midshipmen participate in a swearing-in ceremony in T-Court. Parents and families of the new plebes are encouraged to attend this event and the Navy usually arranges for a fly-by of naval aircraft, weather permitting. Following the swearing-in, the plebes are allowed to visit with family and friends briefly before returning to Bancroft Hall. Plebes will not be allowed to meet with family again until the end of Plebe Summer in mid-August, so this visit on I-day is often emotional.

=== Sample schedule ===
The schedule for I-Day 2006, as released by the Naval Academy Public Affairs Office, was typical.

- 6 to 10 a.m.: Candidates check-in at Alumni Hall.
- 6 a.m. to 3:30 p.m.: Midshipmen rotate through a variety of stations in Alumni Hall including baggage drop off, vision screening, medical tests, the barbershop, uniform fitting and issue, the chaplain's station, the Alumni Association, and checkout.
- 6 p.m.:Plebes participate in the "Oath of Office Ceremony" in T-Court and officially become Midshipmen.
- 6:30 to 7:30 p.m.: Plebes may visit their families who will not see them until Plebe Parents Weekend.
- 7:30 to 9:30 p.m.: Plebes receive general military training in assigned company spaces in Bancroft Hall
- 11 p.m.: Lights Out.

== See also ==
- Naval Academy Bridge

== Bibliography ==
- H. Michael Gelfand. Sea Change at Annapolis: The United States Naval Academy, 1949-2000. University of North Carolina Press, 2006
- Ross MacKenzie. Brief Points: An Almanac for Parents and Friends of U.S. Naval Academy Midshipmen. Naval Institute Press, 2004
- Robert Timberg. The Nightingale's Song. Naval Institute Press, 1996
- USNA Class of 2002. In the Shadow of Greatness. Naval Institute Press, 2012
