= Catch a Rising Star (comedy clubs) =

American chain of comedy clubs

- Industry: Comedy clubs
- Founded: December 1972
- Founder: Rick Newman
- Headquarters: New York City, New York, United States
- Owner: Suzy Yengo Esq.
- Website: catcharisingstar.com

Catch a Rising Star is a chain of comedy clubs, founded in New York City in December 1972 and owned by Rick Newman. It has since spread to other areas, such as Las Vegas and New Jersey. It is currently owned by Suzy Yengo Esq.

The original club in New York City was notable for its role in starting the careers of many famous singers and comedians, many of whom enjoyed later success in television, theater and film. Among these are: Gilbert Gottfried, Pat Benatar, Billy Crystal, Robin Williams, Bill Maher, Joy Behar, Jerry Seinfeld, Andy Kaufman, Richard Belzer, Adam Sandler, Elayne Boosler, Eddie Murphy, Larry David, Ray Romano, Richard Lewis, Chris Rock, and Louis C.K.

The original club has since gone out of business. Its former location was on 1st Avenue between East 78th Street and East 77th Street. In the late 1990s, the club was located on West 28th Street between 7th and 8th Avenues. The chain is currently negotiating to build a new club in the New York area.

Other locations throughout the US are located in Princeton, New Jersey, Reno, Las Vegas, Twin River Casino, Rhode Island and the new Catch A Rising Star on Broadway in New York.
