= Fiasco: The American Military Adventure in Iraq =

2006 book by Thomas E. Ricks

- First edition
- Author: Thomas E. Ricks
- Language: English
- Subject: Iraq War
- Publisher: Penguin Group
- Publication date: 2006
- Publication place: United States
- ISBN: 1-59420-103-X
- OCLC: 67375172
- Dewey Decimal: 956.7044/3 22
- LC Class: DS79.76 .R535 2006

Fiasco: The American Military Adventure in Iraq (2006) is a book by Washington Post Pentagon correspondent Thomas E. Ricks. Fiasco deals with the history of the Iraq War from the planning phase to combat operations in 2006 and argues that the war was badly planned and executed. Ricks based the book in part on interviews with military personnel involved in the planning and execution of the war. In 2009, Ricks published a sequel The Gamble: General David Petraeus and the American Military Adventure in Iraq, 2006–2008. Fiasco was a finalist for the 2007 Pulitzer Prize for General Nonfiction.

== Summary ==
The book alleges that the planning of the Iraq war was mismanaged by both the Bush administration as well as the U.S. Army. Ricks then goes on to outline the infighting between the senior policy advisers such as Colin Powell, Paul Wolfowitz, Donald Rumsfeld and the Army. Ricks includes quotes from former generals of the Iraq war, former Army generals, and several top level officials, both working for the Bush administration and Douglas Feith's planning contingent. Moving into the war, Ricks alleges various miscommunication and mismanagement of the Army's combat tactics as well as criticizing the overall strategy. Ricks also heavily criticizes the actions of L. Paul Bremer and explores his impact as head of the Coalition Provisional Authority.
