= First Principles (book) =

2020 book by Thomas E. Ricks

First Principles: What America's Founders Learned from the Greeks and Romans and How That Shaped Our Country
- Author: Thomas E. Ricks
- Genre: Nonfiction
- Publisher: HarperCollins
- Publication date: November 10, 2020
- ISBN: 9780062997456

First Principles: What America's Founders Learned from the Greeks and Romans and How That Shaped Our Country is a nonfiction book by Thomas E. Ricks, published in 2020. First Principles explores the influence of Ancient Greece and Ancient Rome on the founding of the United States by looking at the educations of George Washington, John Adams, Thomas Jefferson, and James Madison as expressed through their speeches and writings. It entered The New York Times Best Seller list at number 4.

== Summary ==
Classicism was part of the culture of the Thirteen Colonies, driving their political vocabulary and influencing personal values. References to heroes Cicero and Cato, and to villains Catiline and Caesar, were commonly used and expected to be understood by others. The Revolutionary generation placed great weight on the ancient Roman ideal of virtue, and its connotations of "manliness", "honour", worthiness of deferential respect, and civic duty as both citizen and soldier. Within that context, "Part I" of First Principles details the educations of Washington, Jefferson, Adams, and Madison, as well as their ancient inspirations.

Washington, although lacking a good education, became considered an example of the classical Roman standard and the ideal of a public man – "an American Cato". He consciously modeled himself on classical ideals through observation and experience. Adams, who attended Harvard College, idolized Cicero and took him as a model for his own life. Jefferson attended the College of William & Mary. His interests tended more toward the ancient Greeks, in particular, Epicurus. Madison chose Princeton College, almost immediately passing the freshman exam on Greek and Latin authors so as to start with the sophomore course.

In "Part II", First Principles explores how these four Founding Fathers of the United States drew upon the histories of the ancient republics in their approaches to the American Revolution and the construction of a new form of government, citing a letter from Adams as "as succinct an example as exists of the influence of the classical model on the thinking of the Revolutionary generation":

Public Virtue cannot exist in a Nation without private, and public Virtue is the only Foundation of Republics. There must be a positive Passion for the public good, the public Interest, Honour, Power, and Glory, established in the Minds of the People, or there can be no Republican Government, nor any real Liberty. And this public Passion must be Superiour to all private passions.

"Part III" examines the decline of classical ideals throughout the new country as religious evangelism and commercial culture came to the forefront. Although classical scholars warned repeatedly of the dangers of factionalism, partisan politics established itself in the 1790s, which Adams tried to combat with the Sedition Act of 1798. The public equated classicism with elitism; classical republicanism had been rejected.

== Reception ==
The New York Times review describes First Principles as "a judicious account of the equivocal inheritance left to modern Americans by their 18th-century forebears". The American Spectator review says "many of his suggestions come off like melancholy gestures of opposition to contemporary political culture", but concludes that First Principles is "a blueprint for further learning and civic engagement".

USA Today says "Ricks masterfully documents how examples of city states like Athens and the Roman Republic (before Julius Caesar crossed the Rubicon) informed the four aforementioned Founding Fathers and their fellow travelers." The Washington Post describes it as "a rich compendium of the ancient wisdom that Washington, Adams, Jefferson and Madison believed they were gleaning from Aristotle or Tacitus, and the formation of "classically shaped behavior" in the early republic" and The Wall Street Journal says the book is " extraordinarily timely".
