= Rick Newman =

American comedy club owner (1942–2023)

Rick Newman (February 21, 1941 – February 20, 2023) was an American comedy club owner who in 1972 opened the comedy club Catch a Rising Star in Manhattan on First Avenue near East 78th Street. It became a place to showcase emerging stand-up comedians. Some of the most famous comedians who worked there include Robin Williams, Andy Kaufman, Jay Leno, Billy Crystal, Freddie Prinze, Richard Belzer, Joe Piscopo, and David Brenner. Singers, musicians, jugglers, and animal acts were also featured at the comedy club.

Newman had previously run a few other businesses, such as a singles bar and a steakhouse. In the 1980s, he partnered Regis Philbin and Mikhail Baryshnikov to create a restaurant on the Upper West Side of Manhattan.

Newman died of pancreatic cancer on February 20, 2023, one day before his 82nd birthday and one day after Richard Belzer – one of the most famous comedians to work at Newman's comedy club – died in France.
