= Plebe Summer =

United States Naval Academy training program

Plebe Summer is the summer training program which is required of all incoming freshmen to the United States Naval Academy. The program lasts approximately seven weeks and consists of rigorous physical and mental training. The stated purpose of Plebe Summer according to the Academy is to "turn civilians into midshipmen".

== Induction Day ==
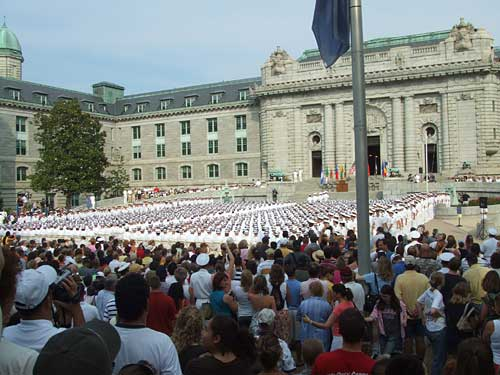
The oath of office

Plebe Summer begins at the end of June with Induction Day or "I-Day". On I-Day, all the candidates say goodbye to their families. Upon entering Alumni Hall, they are greeted by hand-picked upper-class midshipmen, known as Detailers, who are responsible for molding the incoming civilian plebes into disciplined members of the Brigade of Midshipmen. Each plebe is assigned a six-digit Alpha Number, the identifying serial number that they will use for the rest of their Academy career.

The plebes then line up throughout Alumni Hall to receive standard issue gear which includes several uniforms, combat boots, running sneakers and a copy of Reef Points, a 300-page handbook containing required knowledge that all plebes must memorize over the course of the summer. All the male plebes have their hair shaved off by Navy barbers. All female plebes are required to wear their hair in a tight bun, or may receive an optional haircut above their chin.

Plebes are next put through a series of medical examinations and vaccinations, and afterwards learn the proper technique for saluting. During this time, the parents of the plebes are given a glimpse of the summer that their son or daughters will be going through in the form of a presentation by an administrator of the Academy. After the plebes are finished inside Alumni Hall, they move to Bancroft Hall, which will be their home for the next four years.

They are divided into 18 different companies, Alpha through Sierra (there is no Juliet or "J" company in the U.S. Military). The companies are not changed for the entire summer and compete against each other for performance points. Each Company is divided into two platoons of approximately 32 plebes each. Each platoon is divided into 4 squads of approximately 8 plebes. The final public portion of Induction Day is the "Oath of Office" Ceremony which occurs at 1800 (6 pm).

During this ceremony, the entire class of plebes is sworn into the Navy, as active-duty midshipmen, by the Commandant of Midshipmen. Following the Oath of Office, plebes are released to their families for a "good-bye" period of 45 minutes. After the 45 minutes is up, the plebes re-assemble by company on Stribling Walk and march into Bancroft Hall, starting their time at the Academy.

== First Set ==
The first half of Plebe Summer is known to the plebes as "First Set". The first session is dedicated to the basics of familiarizing the incoming plebes with military life. The plebes take classes on Naval Leadership, Honor, Naval Warfare and Tactics, Rank Structure and the Unified Chain of Command.

The plebes are also required to begin memorizing much of the information in their copies of Reef Points. This required knowledge is known at the Academy as the "rates". The plebe's rates consist of knowledge of the enlisted and officer ranks of all branches in the military, proficiency in the NATO phonetic alphabet, information on all current Navy and Marine Corps ships and aircraft, and certain quotes which promote esprit de corps.

Noon meal formation during Plebe Summer

An example of one of the quotes that the plebes are required to memorize verbatim to promote esprit de corps is the following quote,

It is not the critic who counts, not the man who points out how the strong man stumbled, or where the doer of deeds could have done them better. The credit belongs to the man who is actually in the arena, whose face is marred by dust and sweat and blood; who strives valiantly; who errs, who comes short again and again, because there is no effort without error and shortcoming; but who does actually strive to do the deeds; who knows great enthusiasms, the great devotions; who spends himself on a worthy cause; who at the best in the end knows the triumph of high achievement, and who at the worst, if he fails, at least fails while daring greatly, so that his place shall never be with those cold and timid souls who know neither victory nor defeat.

— Theodore Roosevelt, "The Man in the Arena"

The plebes learn to live based on the "Plan of the Day", a planned list of activities (all mandatory) which the plebes will experience each day. The plebes' days begin at 5:30 a.m. (referred to as 0530 Military time) as they are loudly awoken by the cadre and escorted to a field where they participate in PEP (Physical Education Program). PEP consists of various calisthenics and a run (either as a regiment or in groups based on an initial strength test) of increasing distance.

A regimental run during PEP

After PEP, the plebes go to morning meal formation and then morning meal itself (referred to as morning chow). At every meal throughout plebe summer, plebes are required to sit on the front four inches of their chair and must "square" their meals. Squaring meals consists of looking straight ahead while eating, bringing the food straight up and then to their mouths. The plebes have formations before every meal during which accountability (attendance) is taken and uniform inspections given. The formations are held in front of Bancroft Hall for the tourists to see.

The rest of the average daily schedule is composed of various physical activities in addition to numerous classes on Naval oriented study. On most days the plebes practice marching in formation with their issued rifles in what is called "close order drill". Every night of Plebe Summer ends the same way: 30 minutes of free time to write letters followed by the singing of the Navy Blue and Gold before mandatory lights out at 2145.

== Second Set ==
The plebes are certified in rifle and pistol proficiency at the nearby firing range in Naval Station Annapolis using the M16A3 rifle and M9 Standard issue sidearm

The second half of Plebe Summer (known as 2nd set) is focused on transforming the new plebes into members of the Brigade of Midshipmen. At this point in the summer, the plebes are assumed to be familiarized with military life and have a firm grasp on their "rates", so the detailers concentrate on further polishing the plebes' abilities for the upcoming year.

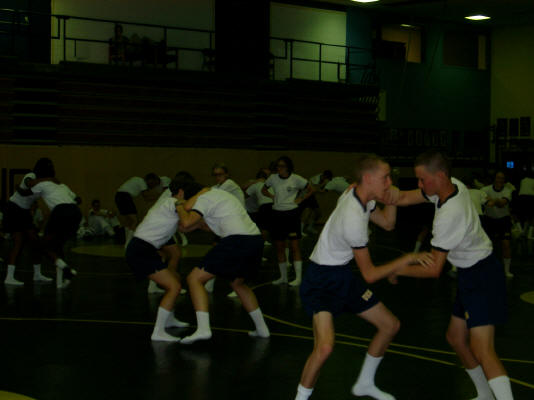
Plebes are also given training in Marine Corps martial arts, boxing and wrestling

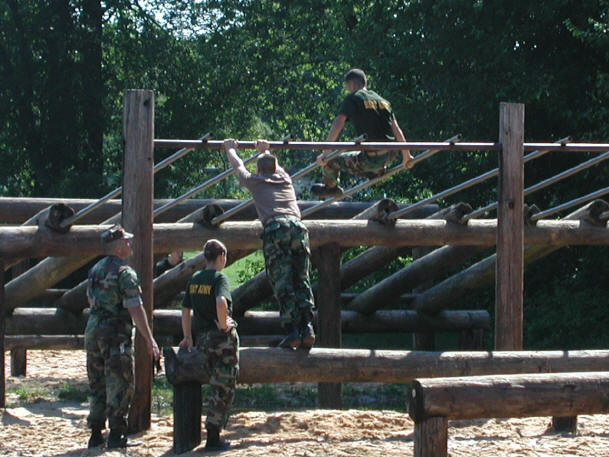
The obstacle course and "Endurance Course" are also part of the curriculum for the second session of Plebe Summer

Most of the plebes have memorized all of the information in Reef Points and can recite any of it when questioned by the detailers. Typically, this questioning on the plebes' rates occurs during meals and in between planned activities in order to test the plebes' ability to remember important information in stressful situations. For example, plebes may be asked to recite the ranks of officers or enlisted in any of the services.

When the second session begins there is a turnover of detailers, and each company receives an entirely new set. During the second session, the plebes begin attending lectures by several notable military speakers such as Jim Lovell, Jim Webb and Joseph Galloway. These lectures are called Forrestal Lectures named after former Secretary of Defense James Forrestal. The lectures are aimed at instilling a sense of honor in the plebes. Official parades are commonly held every week to provide the town of Annapolis with a glimpse of the new class and also to solidify the plebes' drill ability.

Close order drill instruction

The end of Plebe Summer is marked by the beginning of plebe year, which is just as rigorous as Plebe Summer but with the added challenge of academic classes.

== Brigade reform ==
A few days after Parents Weekend, the rest of the Brigade of Midshipmen return. All upper-class must be back on the yard and at their company areas for "reform formation", making ratio of upper-class to plebes now 3:1. Reform presents the plebes with a glimpse of what they will endure throughout the school year as it is the given mission of the upper-class to assist in "training" the plebes. For the rest of the year, the plebes will be viewed upon as second-class citizens by the rest of the Brigade of Midshipmen, who make it a point to "snipe" any plebe who is not doing his or her job correctly (verbally castigate in order to improve the performance of the plebe).
