= Keith W. Nolan =

American historian (1964–2009)

Keith William Nolan (May 7, 1964 – February 19, 2009) was an American military historian, focusing on the various campaigns of the Vietnam War.

== Early life ==
Nolan was born in Webster Groves, Missouri, and lived in southeastern Missouri as well as in the St. Louis suburbs. Nolan's father, William Francis Nolan, the son of an Irish father and a German mother, taught history at St. Louis Community College after serving his country as a Marine. Keith's mother, a Swedish immigrant from Falköping, worked as a dental hygienist. As a child, Nolan was deeply affected by reports of war that he would see on the nightly news; as he grew into a young man, he would later say that these images are what sparked his interest in writing about the Vietnam conflict.

== Publications ==
His first book was published when Nolan was 19 years of age, his first magazine article was published for Vietnam Magazine when he was 14. Nolan graduated from Webster University in Webster Groves, Missouri in 1989 with a bachelor's degree in history.

== Death ==
Nolan was in good health and working on his twelfth manuscript (published posthumously) in 2007 when a routine office visit to his general practitioner revealed a large, late-stage tumor in his lung. Despite intensive treatments, Keith William Nolan died of lung cancer in February 2009 in Wentzville, Missouri at the age of 44. He left behind a young daughter and many loved ones, as well as a tight-knit community of Vietnam War-era veterans whose stories he wrote about in his books.

== Bibliography ==
- House to House:Playing the Enemy's Game in Saigon, ISBN 0-7603-2330-5
- Ripcord: Screaming Eagles Under Siege, Vietnam 1970, ISBN 0-89141-809-1
- Sappers In The Wire (Texas A&M University Military History Series), ISBN 1-58544-643-2
- A Hundred Miles of Bad Road (Dwight Birdwell, coauthor), ISBN 0-89141-712-5
- The Magnificent Bastards: The Joint Army-Marine Defense of Dong Ha, 1968 , ISBN 0-89141-861-X
- Operation Buffalo: USMC Fight for the DMZ, ISBN 0-440-21310-X
- Into Cambodia, 1970: Spring Campaign, Summer Offensive, ISBN 0-89141-368-5
- Into Laos: The Story of Dewey Canyon II/Lam Son 719, Vietnam 1971, ISBN 0-89141-247-6
- Death Valley: The Summer Offensive, I Corps, August 1969, ISBN 0-89141-665-X
- Battle for Hue: Tet 1968, ISBN 0-89141-592-0
- The Battle for Saigon: Tet 1968, ISBN 0-671-52287-6
- Search and Destroy: The Story of an Armored Cavalry Squadron in Vietnam, ISBN 978-0760333129
