= Eric M. Hammel =

American military historian (1946–2020)

- Born: Eric Maxwell Hammel; June 29, 1946; Salem, Massachusetts
- Died: August 25, 2020 (aged 74)
- Education: Attended C. W. Post College, 1964; Temple University, B.S. (journalism), 1972
- Alma mater: Central High School of Philadelphia, January 1964
- Occupations: Author and Publisher
- Known for: Writer on Military History, especially the U.S. Marine Corps
- Notable work: The Root : The Marines in Beirut, August 1982-February 1984
- Awards: 1981, Retail Advertisers' Conference, for radio advertisement for Kennedy Business Machines; 1985, Marine Corps Combat Correspondents Association Award of Merit, for The Root
- Website: www.erichammelbooks.com

Eric M. Hammel (June 29, 1946 – August 25, 2020) was a military historian, with a focus on the military campaigns of the United States Marine Corps in the Pacific War, and other military action in World War II as well as military conflicts including the Vietnam War and the Arab-Israeli Conflict. Hammel wrote a series of books about World War II Flying Aces but his most influential book was The Root : The Marines in Beirut, August 1982-February 1984 on the subject of the 1983 Beirut barracks bombings.

Hammel worked in several occupations before he settled on writing and publishing. He was formerly a stringer and contributing editor to Leatherneck Magazine. He owned and operated a publishing business under the names Pacifica Press and Pacifica Military History. He died on August 25, 2020, of Parkinson's disease.

== Bibliography ==
- Hammel, Eric; introduction by Shepherd, Jr., Lemuel C. (1981). Chosin: Heroic Ordeal of the Korean War. New York: Vanguard Press. ISBN 0-8149-0856-X. LCCN 81016089.
- Porter, R. Bruce; Hammel, Eric; introduction by Boyington, Pappy (1985). Ace! : a Marine night-fighter pilot in World War II (1st ed.). Pacifica, Calif.: Pacifica Press. ISBN 0-935553-01-0. LCCN 86151862.
- Hammel, Eric M. (1985). The root : the marines in Beirut, August 1982-February 1984 (1st ed.). San Diego: Harcourt Brace Jovanovich. ISBN 0-15-179006-X. LCCN 85000805.
- Hammel, Eric M. and John E. Lane (1985). 76 hours : the invasion of Tarawa (1st ed.). Pacifica, Calif.: Pacifica Press. ISBN 0-935553-00-2. LCCN 86152009.
- Asher, Jerry with Eric Hammel (1987). Duel for the Golan : the 100-hour battle that saved Israel (1st ed.). New York: W. Morrow. ISBN 0-688-06911-8. LCCN 86018199.
- Hammel, Eric M. (1987). Guadalcanal (Carrier battles) (1st ed.). New York: Crown. ISBN 0-517-56608-7. LCCN 86032964.
- Hammel, Eric M. (1987). Guadalcanal : starvation island (1st ed.). New York: Crown Publishers. ISBN 0-517-56417-3. LCCN 86016586.
- Hammel, Eric M. (1988). Guadalcanal : decision at sea : the naval battle of Guadalcanal, November 13–15, 1942 (1st ed.). New York: Crown. ISBN 0-517-56952-3. LCCN 87037963.
- Hammel, Eric M. (1989). Munda trail : the New Georgia campaign (1st ed.). New York: Orion Books. ISBN 0-517-56972-8. LCCN 88012684.
- Camp, Richard D. with Eric Hammel (1989). Lima-6 : a Marine company commander in Vietnam, June 1967-January 1968. New York: Atheneum. ISBN 0-689-12045-1. LCCN 89006967.
- Pergrin, David E. with Eric Hammel (1989). First across the Rhine : the 291st Engineer Combat Battalion in France, Belgium, and Germany. New York: Atheneum. ISBN 0-689-12033-8. LCCN 89000185.
- Hammel, Eric M. (1989). Khe Sanh : siege in the clouds : an oral history (1st ed.). New York: Crown Publishers. ISBN 0-517-57268-0. LCCN 88039767.
- Hammel, Eric M. (1990). Ambush Valley : I Corps, Vietnam 1967 : the story of a Marine infantry battalion's battle for survival. Novato, CA: Presidio Press. ISBN 0-89141-365-0. LCCN 90030090.
- Hammel, Eric M. (1991). Fire in the streets : the battle for Hue, Tet 1968. Chicago: Contemporary Books. ISBN 0-8092-4279-6. LCCN 90022867.
- Hammel, Eric M. (1992). Six days in June : how Israel won the 1967 Arab-Israeli War. New York: Scribner's. ISBN 978-0-684-19390-8. LCCN 92004596.
- Hammel, Eric M. (1992–1998). The American aces speak. Vol. 1–3, 5. Novato, CA: Presidio. ISBN 0-89141-440-1. LCCN 91042810. 089141441X (v. 2), 0935553142 (v. 3), 0935553282 (v. 5)
- Hammel, Eric M. (1992–1996). Aces against Japan. Vol. 1 and 2. Novato, CA: Presidio. ISBN 0-89141-440-1. LCCN 91042724. 0935553142 (v. 2)
- Hammel, Eric M. (1993). Aces against Germany. Vol. 1 and 2. Novato, CA: Presidio. ISBN 0-89141-441-X. LCCN 93006548.
- Hammel, Eric M. (1994). Air war Europa : America's air war against Germany in Europe and north Africa, 1942-1945 : chronology. Pacifica, CA: Pacifica Press. ISBN 0-935553-07-X. LCCN 94004181.
- Hammel, Eric M. (1997). Carrier clash : the invasion of Guadalcanal and the battle of the eastern Solomons, August 1942. Pacifica, CA: Pacifica Press. ISBN 0-935553-20-7. LCCN 96043501.
- Blackburn, Tom with Eric Hammel (1997). The Jolly Rogers : the story of Tom Blackburn and Navy Fighting Squadron VF-17. Pacifica, CA: Pacifica Press. ISBN 0-935553-19-3. LCCN 96042244.
- compiled by Eric Hammel (1998). Aces in combat. Pacifica, CA: Pacifica Press. ISBN 0-935553-28-2. LCCN 98004256.
- Raymond, Robert S. (with Eric Hammel) (1998). A Yank in Bomber Command. Pacifica, CA: Pacifica Press. ISBN 0-935553-27-4. LCCN 98005323.
- Hammel, Eric M. (1999). Marines at war : 20 true heroic tales of U.S. Marines in combat, 1942-1983 (1st ed.). Pacifica, CA: Pacifica Press. ISBN 0-935553-40-1. LCCN 99022192. (pbk.)
- Hammel, Eric M. (1999). Carrier strike : the Battle of the Santa Cruz Islands, October 1942. Dustjacket and maps by Carol Moody (1st ed.). Pacifica, CA: Pacifica Press. ISBN 0-935553-37-1. LCCN 99054764.
- Hammel, Eric M. (2005). Pacific warriors : the U.S. marines in World War II : a pictorial tribute. St. Paul, MN: Zenith Press. ISBN 0-7603-2097-7. LCCN 2006297865. (hbk.)
- Hammel, Eric M. (2006). Iwo Jima : [portrait of a battle : United States Marines at war in the Pacific]. St. Paul, MN: Zenith Press. ISBN 978-0-7603-2520-9. LCCN 2006015636. (hardbound w/ jacket)
- Hammel, Eric M. (2007). Guadalcanal : the U.S. Marines in World War II : a pictorial tribute. St. Paul: Zenith Press. ISBN 978-0-7603-3148-4. LCCN 2007000504. (hbk.)
- Hammel, Eric M. (2007). Marines in Hue city : a portrait of urban combat, Tet 1968. St. Paul: Zenith Press. ISBN 978-0-7603-2521-6. LCCN 2006022062.
- Hammel, Eric M.; Lane, John E. (February 20, 2006). Bloody Tarawa: The 2nd Marine Division, November 20–23, 1943. Zenith Press. ISBN 978-0-7603-2402-8.
- Hammel, Eric M. (2007). New Georgia, Bougainville, and Cape Gloucester : the U.S. Marines in World War II : a pictorial tribute. St. Paul: Zenith Press. ISBN 978-0-7603-3296-2. LCCN 2007039640.
- Hammel, Eric M. (2008). U.S. Marines in World War II : Tarawa and the Marshalls : a pictorial tribute. Minneapolis, Minn.: Zenith Press. ISBN 978-0-7603-3329-7. LCCN 2008015726.
- Hammel, Eric M. (2009). How America saved the world : the untold story of U.S. preparedness between the world wars. Minneapolis: Zenith Press/MBI Pub. Co. ISBN 978-0-7603-3511-6. LCCN 2008045649.
- Hammel, Eric M. (2010). Islands of hell : the U.S. Marines in the Western Pacific, 1944-1945. Minneapolis: MBI Pub. Co. : Zenith Press. ISBN 978-0-7603-3779-0. LCCN 2009030268.
- Hammel, Eric M. (2011). Always faithful : U.S. Marines in World War II combat. Long Island City, New York: Osprey Publishing. ISBN 978-1-84908-538-0. LCCN 2011275228.
- ACE!: A Marine Night-Fighter Pilot in World War II (1985) ISBN 0-935553-31-2
- Munda Trail: The New Georgia Campaign (1989) ISBN 978-0-517-56972-6
- The Root: The Marines in Beirut, August 1982–February 1984 (1985) ISBN 0-15-179006-X
- Guadalcanal: The Carrier Battles (1987) ISBN 0-517-56608-7
- Guadalcanal: Starvation Island (1995) ISBN 0-935553-11-8
- Guadalcanal: Decision at Sea (1997) ISBN 0-935553-35-5
- Six Days in June: How Israel Won the 1967 Arab-Israeli War (2001) ISBN 0-935553-54-1
- Carrier Clash: The Invasion of Guadalcanal & The Battle of the Eastern Solomons August 1942 (2004) ISBN 0-7603-2052-7

== Memberships ==
- Marine Corps Historical Foundation
- Marine Corps Combat Correspondents Association
- Marine Corps Association
- The Chosin Few (honorary founder)
- Second Marine Division Association
- Guadalcanal Campaign Veterans
