= Ed Rasimus =

Edward J. Rasimus (September 29, 1942 – January 30, 2013) was a United States Air Force Major and a veteran fighter pilot of the Vietnam War. Rasimus flew more than 250 combat missions in F-105 Thunderchief and F-4 Phantom II fighters during the conflict and received the Silver Star, the Distinguished Flying Cross five times, and numerous Air Medals. Rasimus was an author residing in Northern Texas. He is featured in There Is a Way (1967), a short film produced by the Aerospace Audio Visual Service Military Airlift Command portraying the life of F-105 pilots in Southeast Asia during the Vietnam War.

== Published books ==
- Fighter Pilot: The Memoirs of Legendary Ace Robin Olds - Co-authored by Robin Olds and Christina Olds - ISBN 978-0-312-56023-2 - St. Martin's Press (April 13, 2010)
- Palace Cobra: A Fighter Pilot in the Vietnam Air War - ISBN 978-0-312-94876-4 - St. Martin's Paperbacks (August 28, 2007) (Hardcover edition, April 2006, St. Martin's Press)
- Phantom Flights, Bangkok Nights: A Vietnam War Pilot's Second Tour - ISBN 978-1-58834-199-0 - Smithsonian Books (November 30, 2005) (Never Published, released as Palace Cobra in April 2006, hardcover from St. Martin's Press)
- When Thunder Rolled: An F-105 Pilot Over North Vietnam - ISBN 978-0-89141-854-2 - Presidio Press (September 28, 2004) (Hardcover edition, January 2003, Smithsonian Institution Press)
