= Making the Corps =

- First edition cover
- Author: Thomas E. Ricks
- Language: English
- Genre: Military
- Published: 1997
- Publisher: Scribner
- Publication place: U.S.
- Pages: 320
- ISBN: 0684848171

Making the Corps is a non-fiction book written by Thomas E. Ricks. It was published in 1997 under Scribner’s publication .

== Background ==
Ricks was granted access to the receiving, forming, training, graduation, recruit evaluation files, and permission to conduct recruit and staff interviews of Platoon 3086 on Parris Island for an article for the Wall Street Journal, which was published in 1995. Ricks later expanded his research into a book, Making the Corps, which was published by Scribner two years later.

== Themes ==
Aside from providing an insider's view of recruit training, it explores the divergent worldviews of U.S.M.C. values and that of contemporary American society.

== Uses for military ==
Making the Corps is included in the Commandants Professional Reading List as issued by the United States Marine Corps.

== Publication history ==
Making the Corps has remained in print since the time of its release. It was reissued in a 10th-anniversary edition in 2007.

== Similar texts ==
- Da Cruz, Daniel. Boot. St. Martin Press, 1987.
