= The Gamble (book) =

Book by Thomas E. Ricks

- Author: Thomas E. Ricks
- Language: English
- Subject: Iraq War
- Genre: Non-fiction
- Publisher: The Penguin Press
- Publication date: February 10, 2009
- Publication place: United States
- Media type: Print (Hardback)
- Pages: 400
- ISBN: 978-1-59420-197-4
- Preceded by: Fiasco: The American Military Adventure in Iraq

The Gamble: General David Petraeus and the American Military Adventure in Iraq, 2006–2008 is a 2009 book by journalist Thomas E. Ricks about the Iraq War. It covers the 2006–2008 period where his last book Fiasco left off. A primary focus is the Iraq War troop surge of 2007, along with the ascension to command of Gen. David Petraeus and the change in approach of Gen. Ray Odierno towards the use of counter-insurgency strategies. Ricks believes that the troop surge was successful in reducing violence in Iraq and "reviv[ing] American prospects in the war," but that it was a failure based on its initial goal of bringing about a political reconciliation in Iraq.

Ricks states in the first chapter of the book (page 8):

In revisiting the U.S. approach to the Iraq war, Petraeus found tactical success--that is, improved security--but not the clear political breakthrough that would have meant unambiguous strategic success. At the end of the surge, the fundamental political problems facing Iraq were the same ones as when it began. At the end of 2008, two years into the revamped war, there was no prospect of the fighting ending anytime soon. But it was almost certain that whenever it did end, it wouldn't be with the victory that the Bush administration continued to describe, of an Iraq that was both a stable democracy and an ally of the United States. Nor was that really the goal anymore, though no one had said so publicly. Under Petraeus, the American goal of transforming Iraq had quietly been scaled down. But even his less ambitious target of sustainable security would remain elusive, with no certainty of reaching it anytime soon.

Ricks also predicted that the US would have combat troops in Iraq until at least 2015. The last US combat troops left Iraq in December 2011, only to return in 2014's deployment of US troops in a counteroffensive against the Islamic State's invasion of Northern Iraq.

Ricks appeared to promote the book on The Daily Show with Jon Stewart on 10 February 2009.

== See also ==
- David Kilcullen
