= In the Shadow of Greatness =

2012 book

- Editors: Josh Welle, John Ennis, Katherine Kranz, Graham Plaster
- Author: United States Naval Academy Class of 2002
- Language: English
- Subject: United States Naval Academy
- Genre: Biography
- Publisher: Naval Institute Press
- Publication date: August 15, 2012
- Publication place: United States
- Media type: Print (hardcover)
- Pages: 247
- ISBN: 9781612511382

In the Shadow of Greatness is a book written by 33 members of the United States Naval Academy Class of 2002 and published by the United States Naval Institute in 2012.

The authors describe how their lives were shaped by their experiences at the Academy, the September 11 attacks, and the events following graduation. The stories describe subjects such as relief assignments to Haiti, diplomatic missions, cross-service training and deployments, losing infantrymen in combat, and the stress of pilots on missions. There are homages to the fallen, including Navy Lieutenant Richard F. Andersen, Marine Corps Capt. Matthew C. Freeman, Navy Lieutenant John J. Houston, Marine Corps Lt. Col. Kevin Shea, and Marine Corps 2nd Lieutenant Andrew Torres. Gary C. Ross discusses his same-sex marriage following the repeal of DADT; others tell of rescues at sea and in the crater of Mount St. Helens. Other topics include two-career couples and the long wars in Iraq and Afghanistan.

The foreword was written by David Gergen and the epilogue by Admiral Mike Mullen. General John Allen—Commandant of Midshipmen in 2002—wrote for the book, as did his predecessor, Admiral Sam Locklear.

The authors' proceeds go to veterans' organizations, including Luke's Wings, the Semper Fi Fund, The Mission Continues, Iraq and Afghanistan Veterans of America, The Travis Manion Foundation, and the Matthew Freeman Project.

Released in August 2012, In the Shadow of Greatness achieved Los Angeles Times Bestseller status that October. John Nagl reviewed the book in the September 2012 issue of the Naval Institute's Proceedings Magazine, writing: "All of these stories give voice to courage, sacrifice, and the nobility of living in the service of others." Tom Brokaw provided this blurb: "This is a must read for all Americans - an up close and personal account of duty and sacrifice by graduates of the U.S. Naval Academy in Iraq and Afghanistan."
