= Eason Jordan =

American television executive (born 1960)

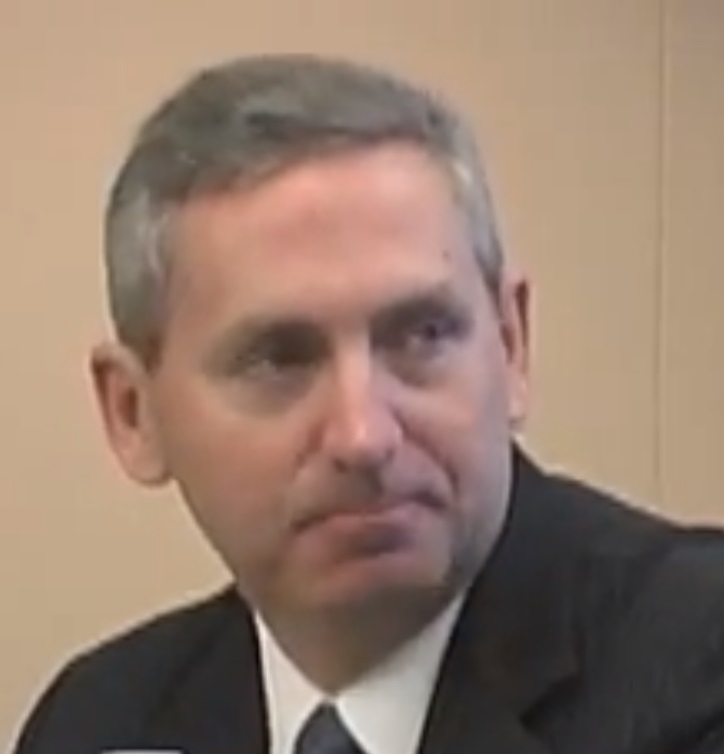
- Eason Jordan in 2012
- Born: October 16, 1960 (age 65); U.S.
- Occupations: Journalist, television executive, entrepreneur
- Employer: CNN (1982–2005)
- Awards: Emmy Award (x4); Peabody Award (x2); DuPont-Columbia Award; Livingston Award

Eason Jordan (born October 16, 1960) is an executive and entrepreneur who serves as the Rockefeller Foundation's Senior Vice President for Connected Leaders.

He previously helped launch and lead CNN, NowThis News, the Malala Fund and several of his own companies.

== Biography ==
Jordan studied at DeKalb College and Georgia State University. Early jobs included assignment editor at WXIA-TV, and radio news correspondent at WGIG, both in Atlanta. He was later a correspondent for WSBI in Brunswick, Tennessee.

At CNN, where he worked 1982-2005, he served as chief news executive and president of newsgathering and international networks. While at CNN, he helped oversee CNN's coverage of the Falklands War and the 1982 Lebanon War. In 1989 he was appointed to direct CNN's international news coverage, and in 1995 took on the added responsibility of overseeing CNN International.

He subsequently (2005-2012) founded and headed several companies, including Oryx Strategies, Poll Position, Headline Apps, and Praedict. In 2006, Jordan teamed up with journalist Robert Young Pelton and several others to launch Iraq Slogger, a clearinghouse of news and information coming out of Iraq during the Iraq War. The site was intended to aggregate articles by both foreign correspondents and Iraqi journalists, as well as nonprofessionals. According to Pelton, the site had insufficient income and ceased operations in 2009.

In 2012, Jordan joined NowThis, a digital video news service, as its founding general manager, working there for two years.

He later (2014-2017) served as a director at the Malala Fund, the education-focused foundation launched by Malala Yousafzai, the youngest-ever Nobel Peace Prize laureate and U.N. Messenger of Peace. He initially served as the organization's director of operations and communications and later as its director of special projects.

Jordan serves on the board of trustees of the Fugees Family NGO and the advisory council of Stanford's Human Perception Lab, and he is member of the Council on Foreign Relations and the ONE Campaign.

He was portrayed by the actor Clark Gregg in Live From Baghdad (2002), a film about the team of CNN journalists who covered the first Gulf War. As CNN was the only news organization broadcasting live, firsthand reports from Baghdad, the Iraqi capital, for most of the war, this is widely considered the event that "put CNN on the map".

== Controversy ==
On April 11, 2003, Jordan revealed in an opinion piece in The New York Times called "The News We Kept to Ourselves" that CNN knew about human rights abuses committed in Iraq by Saddam Hussein since 1990. As described in the same essay, Jordan personally met with Uday Hussein, eldest son of Saddam Hussein of Iraq, in 1995 at the Iraqi Olympic Committee headquarters, where Hussein told Jordan he intended to assassinate his two sons-in-law, Hussein Kamel al-Majid and Saddam Kamel, who had defected to Jordan and exposed the Iraqi regime. They were eventually killed upon their return to Iraq.

In response to his op-ed, Jordan was harshly criticized by The New Republic's Franklin Foer, in an article in The Wall Street Journal, who said CNN should have left Iraq rather than spread the regime's propaganda.

=== Alleged comments at 2005 World Economic Forum ===
On January 27, 2005, during the World Economic Forum annual meeting in Davos, Switzerland, Jordan was reported to have said that American troops were targeting journalists. Although there is no transcript of Jordan's statement (the event was videotaped, but the WEF refused to release it, or make a transcript of the event), Barney Frank claimed Jordan seemed to be suggesting "it was official military policy to take out journalists", and later added that some U.S. soldiers targeted reporters "maybe knowing they were killing journalists, out of anger" — claims that Jordan denied.

On February 11, 2005, Jordan resigned from CNN to "prevent CNN from being unfairly tarnished by the controversy over conflicting accounts of my recent remarks regarding the alarming number of journalists killed in Iraq". In a press release, Jordan also stated that "I have great admiration and respect for the men and women of the U.S. armed forces, with whom I have worked closely and been embedded in Baghdad, Tikrit, and Mosul".

U.S. News & World Report editor-at-large David Gergen, who had moderated the WEF discussion, and BBC executive Richard Sambrook, defended Jordan and claimed his remarks, though controversial, were not as extreme as they were hyped and that he did not deserve to be removed from CNN. But U.S. entrepreneur Rony Abovitz, former CNN reporter Rebecca MacKinnon, U.S. journalist Bret Stephens, Swiss journalist Bernard Rapazz, U.S. Senator Chris Dodd, and French historian Justin Vaïsse were also present, and confirmed the essentials of Frank's account.

Bloggers who covered the story (most newspapers and networks chose not to) noted that Jordan had been accusing Israeli and U.S. troops of deliberately targeting journalists as early as October 2002, and had made similar specific claims about Iraq in November 2004. They also noted his earlier admission (in his New York Times Op-Ed piece, "The News We Kept to Ourselves") that CNN had deliberately downplayed the brutality of the Saddam Hussein regime in order to maintain CNN's access to the country.

== Awards ==
Jordan is the recipient of four Emmy Awards, two Peabody Awards, and the DuPont-Columbia Award. At the age of 31, he received the Livingston Award's "Special Citation For Outstanding Achievement" (previously only given posthumously) for coverage of the Gulf War, the Soviet crisis, and the African famine. The Livingston Awards for excellence by professionals under the age of 35 are the largest all-media, general reporting prizes in American journalism.
