= Thomas E. Ricks (journalist) =

American journalist and author (born 1955)

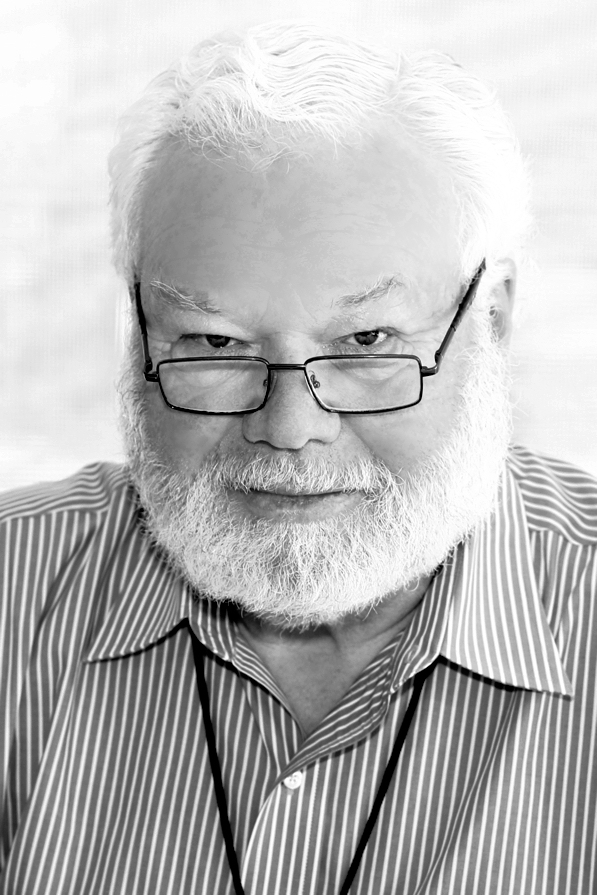
- Ricks at the 2022 Texas Book Festival
- Born: Thomas Edwin Ricks; September 25, 1955 (age 71); Beverly, Massachusetts, U.S.
- Education: Yale University, 1977
- Occupations: Writer, journalist, editor, and educator
- Employer: Center for a New American Security
- Known for: critique of U.S. national security policy, especially Operation Iraqi Freedom
- Awards: 2000 Pulitzer Prize for National Reporting (on Wall Street Journal team); 2002 Pulitzer Prize for National Reporting (on Washington Post team); Society of Professional Journalists Award for best feature reporting 2007 Distinguished alumnus of Scarsdale High School

Thomas Edwin "Tom" Ricks (born September 25, 1955) is an American journalist and author who specializes in the military and national security issues. He is a two-time winner of the Pulitzer Prize for National Reporting as part of teams from the Wall Street Journal (2000) and Washington Post (2002). He has reported on U.S. military activities in Somalia, Haiti, Korea, Bosnia, Kosovo, Macedonia, Kuwait, Turkey, Afghanistan, and Iraq. He previously wrote a blog for Foreign Policy and is a member of the Center for a New American Security, a defense policy think tank.

Ricks lectures widely to the military and is a member of Harvard University's Senior Advisory Council on the Project on U.S. Civil-Military Relations. Ricks is the author of several nonfiction books including Making the Corps (1997); the bestselling Fiasco: The American Military Adventure in Iraq (2006) and its follow-up, The Gamble: General David Petraeus and the American Military Adventure in Iraq, 2006–2008 (2009); Churchill and Orwell: The Fight For Freedom (2017); the bestselling First Principles: What America's Founders Learned from the Greeks and Romans and How That Shaped Our Country (2020); and Waging a Good War: A Military History of the Civil Rights Movement, 1954-1968 (2022).

== Life and career ==
Ricks was born in Beverly, Massachusetts, and grew up in New York and Afghanistan, one of six children. He is the son of Anne and David Frank Ricks, a professor of psychology. He attended the American International School in Kabul (1968–1970), including his freshman year of high school. He graduated from Scarsdale High School (1973).

After earning a B.A. from Yale University (1977), he was an instructor at Lingnan College, Hong Kong (1977–1979), and assistant editor at the Wilson Quarterly (1979–1981). At the Wall Street Journal he was a reporter (1982–1985) and deputy Miami bureau chief (1986). In Washington, D.C., he was a Journal reporter (1987–1989), feature editor (1989–1992), and Pentagon correspondent, (1992–1999). He was a military correspondent at the Washington Post (2000–2008).

While at the Wall Street Journal, he was one of the reporters writing the "Price of Power" series discussing United States defense spending and potential changes confronting the US military following the Cold War. The series won the Journal the 2000 Pulitzer Prize for National Reporting. He won a second Pulitzer Prize for National Reporting in 2002 as part of The Washington Post team for reporting about the beginnings of the U.S. counteroffensive against terrorism.

Ricks was a finalist for the 2007 Pulitzer Prize for General Nonfiction for his book Fiasco: The American Military Adventure in Iraq.

Ricks was immensely critical of Fox News' coverage of the 2012 Benghazi attack. While being interviewed by Jon Scott, Ricks accused Fox News of being "extremely political" in its coverage of the attack and stated, "Fox was operating as a wing of the Republican Party."

He wrote Churchill and Orwell: The Fight For Freedom, a dual biography of George Orwell and Winston Churchill. Near the end, he offers a journalist credo:

The struggle to see things as they are is perhaps the fundamental driver of Western civilization. There is a long but direct line from Aristotle and Archimedes to Locke, Hume, Mill and Darwin, and from there through Orwell and Churchill to Martin Luther King writing his 'Letter from Birmingham City Jail'. It is the agreement that objective reality exists, that people of goodwill can perceive it, and that other people will change their views when presented with the facts of the matter.

== Books ==
=== Nonfiction ===
- Making the Corps. Scribner, 1997. ISBN 978-0-684-84817-4
- Fiasco: The American Military Adventure in Iraq. Penguin Group, 2006. ISBN 1-59420-103-X
- The Gamble: General David Petraeus and the American Military Adventure in Iraq, 2006–2008. The Penguin Press, 2009. ISBN 978-1-59420-197-4
- The Generals: American Military Command from World War II to Today. Penguin Press, 2012. ISBN 978-1-59420-404-3
- Churchill & Orwell: The Fight for Freedom. Penguin Press, 2017. ISBN 978-1-59420-613-9
- First Principles: What America's Founders Learned from the Greeks and Romans and How That Shaped Our Country. Harper, 2020. ISBN 978-0-06-299745-6
- Waging a Good War: A Military History of the Civil Rights Movement, 1954-1968. Farrar, Straus and Giroux, 2022. ISBN 978-0-374-60516-2

=== Fiction ===
- A Soldier's Duty. Random House, 2001. ISBN 978-0-375-50544-7
- Everyone Knows But You. Pegasus Crime, 2024. ISBN 978-1-63936-679-8
- We Can't Save You. Pegasus Crime, forthcoming 2025. ISBN 978-1-63936-907-2
