= Harold Lee Wise =

American naval historian

Harold Lee Wise is a naval historian, focused on recent U.S. military history. He is a former adjunct history professor at Elizabeth City State University in North Carolina and Northwestern University, and winner of the Ben H. Powell writing award at his alma mater Sam Houston State University. Wise is currently an ordained elder with the Global Methodist Church. He was a guest on NPR's Throughline in June 2026.

== Books and Articles ==
His 2007 book "Inside the Danger Zone: The U.S. Military in the Persian Gulf 1987-88" (Naval Institute Press, 2007) was favorably reviewed (in Rotor Review Summer 2018 #141) by Captain Bill Feltzer, who partook in the events. Wise contributed the article "One Day of War" to Naval History Magazine in 2013.
