= Jessica (given name) =

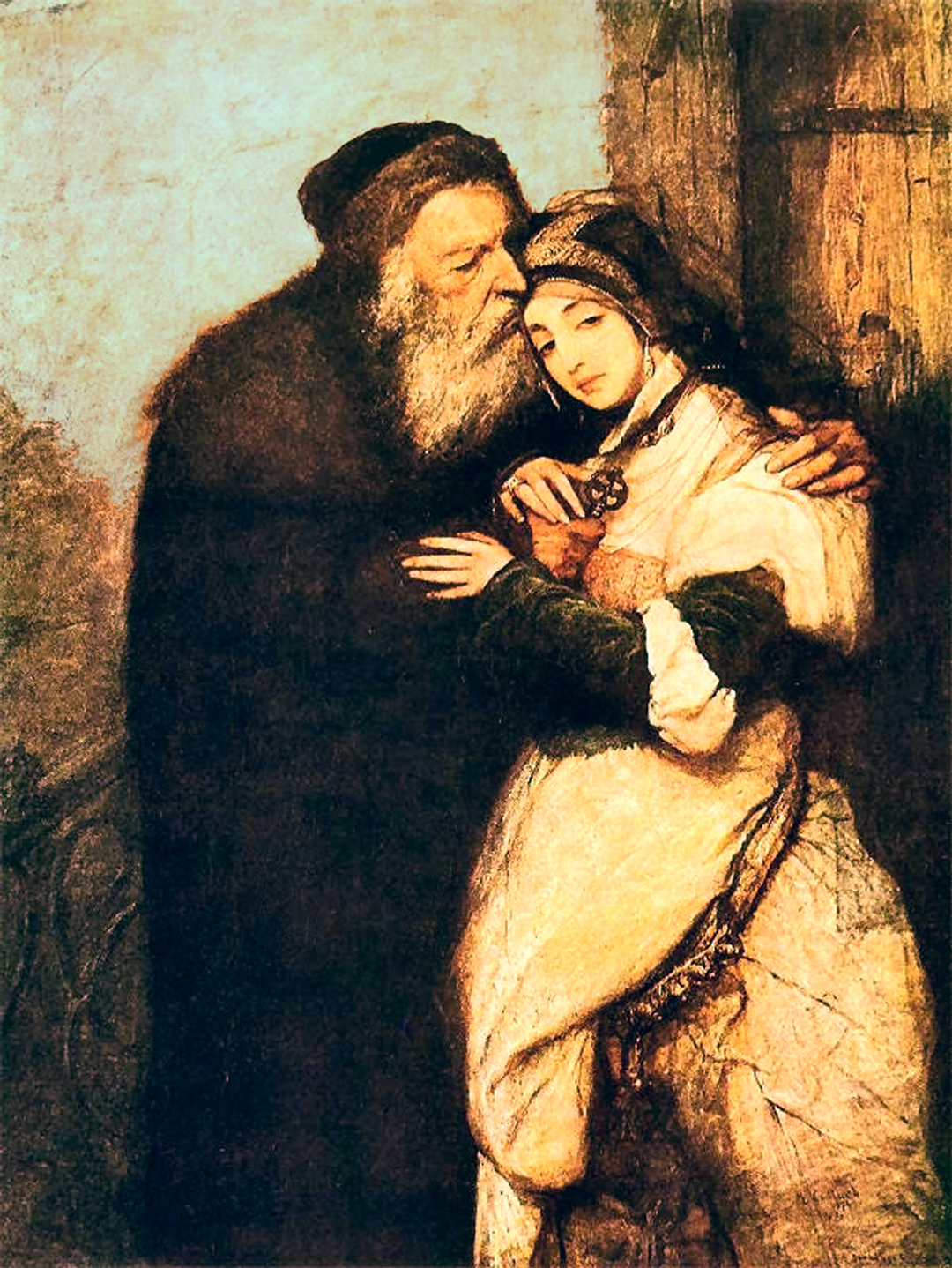
- A painting depicting Shylock and Jessica; the first use of the name Jessica is found in William Shakespeare's play The Merchant of Venice
- Pronunciation: /ˈdʒɛsɪkə/ JESS-ik-ə
- Gender: Female

Origin
- Origin: Early Modern English, derived from Hebrew, ultimately from the triconsonantal root ס־כ־ה, 'to see, behold, look for'
- Meaning: "he will see/behold/look for"
- Region of origin: Mesopotamia, during the exile of the Judean aristocracy from Judea

Other names
- Related names: Jess; Jessi; Jessie; Gessica

Jessica (originally Iessica, also Jesica, Jesika, Jessicah, Jessika, or Jessikah) is a female given name of English origin.

The oldest written record of the name with its current spelling is found as the name of the Shakespearean character Jessica, from the play The Merchant of Venice. The name may have been an anglicisation of the biblical Iscah (from Hebrew: יִסְכָּה, romanized: yiskā́), the name of a daughter of Haran briefly mentioned in the Book of Genesis. Iscah was rendered as "Iesca" (Jeska) in the Matthew Bible version available in Shakespeare's day. Alternately, Shakespeare might have derived the name from a feminine version of the name Jesse, or from jess, a thin leather strap used to tether a bird such as a falcon in falconry.

"Jessica" was the first- or second-most popular female baby name in the United States from 1981 to 1998 before falling out of the Top 20 in 2004. It also rose to No. 1 in England and Wales in 2005, dropping to No. 3 in 2006. Common nicknames of the name Jessica include "Jess", "Jessi" and "Jessie".

== Jessica in other languages ==
- Albanian: Xhesika
- Arabic: جيسيكا (Jisika)
- Armenian: Յեսքա (Yeskʿa) (in Bible), Ջեսիկա (J̌esika)
- Bengali: জেসিকা (Jēsikā)
- Bulgarian: Джесика (Dzhesika)
- Chinese: 潔西卡(Jié xī kǎ)
- Czech: Jessica
- Danish: Jessica
- Dutch: Jessica
- Esperanto: Ĝesika
- Finnish: Jessica
- French: Jessica
- Georgian: ჯესიკა (Jesik’a)
- German: Jessica
- Greek: Τζέσικα (Tzésika)
- Gujarati: જેસિકા (Jēsikā)
- Hebrew: ג'סיקה
- Hindi: जेसिका (jesika)
- Hungarian: Dzsesszika
- Indonesian: Jessica
- Italian: Jessica, Gessica
- Japanese: ジェシカ (Jeshika)
- Kannada: ಜೆಸ್ಸಿಕಾ (Jessikā)
- Korean: 제시카 (Jesika)
- Malay: Jessica
- Marathi: जेसिका (jesika)
- Mongolian: жессика (Jyessika)
- Norwegian: Jessica
- Persian: جسیکا
- Polish: Jessica
- Portuguese: Jéssica, Géssica
- Punjabi: ਜੈਸਿਕਾ (Jaisikā)
- Romanian: Jessica
- Russian: Джессика (Dzhessika)
- Serbian: Џесика (Džesika)
- Slovene: Jessica
- Spanish: Jessica
- Swedish: Jessica
- Tamil: ஜெசிகா (Jecikā)
- Telugu: జెస్సికా (Jessikā)
- Thai: เจสซิกา (Ces̄s̄ik̂ā)
- Turkish: Jessica
- Ukrainian: Джессіка (Dzhessika)
- Urdu: جیسکا
- Vietnamese: Chúatể
- Welsh: Jessica

== People with the given name ==
- Jessica Abel (born 1969), American comic book writer and artist
- Jessica Aber (1981–2025), American attorney
- Jessica Adair (born 1986), American professional basketball player
- Jessica Adolfsson (born 1998), Swedish ice hockey player
- Jessica Aguilar (born 1982), Mexican-American mixed martial artist
- Jessica Ainscough (1985–2015), Australian teen magazine editor and wellness entrepreneur
- Jessica Alba (born 1981), American actress
- Jessica Alexander (born 1999), English actress and model
- Jessica Allister (born 1982), American softball coach and former catcher
- Jessica Alves (born 1983), Brazilian-British television personality
- Jessica Amornkuldilok (born 1985), Thai model
- Jessica Anderson (footballer) (born 1997), Australian rules footballer
- Jessica Anderson (writer) (1916–2010), Australian novelist and short story writer
- Jessica Andersson (born 1973), Swedish singer
- Jessica Andrews (born 1983), American country music singer
- Jessica Antiles (born 1996), American swimmer
- Jessica-Jane Applegate (born 1996), British Paralympic swimmer
- Jessica Ayala, American politician
- Jessica Backhaus (born 1970), German photographer
- Jessica Bäckman (born 1997), Swedish racing driver
- Jessica Baglow (born 1989), English actress
- Jessica Balogun (born 1988), German professional boxer
- Jessica Barden (born 1992), English actress
- Jessica Barry (born 1994), British boxer
- Jessica Barson, American neuroscientist and associate professor
- Jessica Barth, American actress
- Jessica Barter, New Zealand architect
- Jessica Beinecke (born 1980s), American educator, entertainer, videographer and online personality
- Jessica Bejarano, American conductor
- Jessica Bendinger (born 1966), American screenwriter and novelist
- Jessica Benham (born 1990), American politician and disability rights activist
- Jessica Benjamin (born 1946), American psychoanalyst
- Jessica Berscheid (born 1997), Luxembourgish footballer
- Jessica-Bianca Wessolly (born 1996), German sprinter
- Jessica Bibby (born 1979), Australian sportswoman
- Jessica Biel (born 1982), American actress and model
- Jessica Bird (born 1996), American novelist
- Jessica Blank, American actress, writer, and director
- Jessica Blaszka (born 1992), Dutch wrestler
- Jessica Boehrs (born 1980), German actress and singer
- Jessica Bonilla (born 1996), Mexican female road and track cyclist
- Jessica Boone (born 1984), American film, television, theatre, and voice actress
- Jessica Borthwick (1888–1946), British filmmaker and sculptor
- Jessica Brody, American author
- Jessica Brown Findlay (born 1989), English actress
- Jessica Buettner (born 1995), Canadian powerlifter
- Jessy Bulbo (born 1974), Mexican singer, bassist and composer
- Jessica Burciaga (born 1983), American model
- Jessica Caban (born 1982), American model, dancer and actress
- Jessica Caloza, Filipino American politician
- Jessica Cambensy (born 1988), American-born Hong Kong model and actress
- Jessica Capshaw (born 1976), American actress
- Jessica Care Moore (born 1971), American poet
- Jessica Caro (born 1988), Colombian footballer
- Jessika Carter (born 1999), American basketball player
- Jessica Castles (born 2002), English-Swedish artistic gymnast
- Jessica Chastain (born 1977), American actress
- Jessica Chávez (born 1988), Mexican professional boxer
- Jessica Ching (born 1987), Hong Kong racewalking athlete
- Jessica Cirio (born 1985), Argentine model
- Jessica Cisneros (born 1993), American attorney
- Jessica Clark (actress) (born 1985), British model and actress
- Jessica Clarke (model) (born 1993), New Zealand model
- Jessica Clarke (footballer) (born 1989), English footballer
- Jessica G. L. Clarke (born 1983), American lawyer
- Jessica Cleaves (1948–2014), American singer and songwriter
- Jessica-Jane Clement (born 1985), British glamour model, actress and TV presenter
- Jessica Coch (born 1979), Mexican actress
- Jessi Combs (1980–2019), American racer and TV presenter
- Jessica J. Connelly, professor of psychology
- Jessica Cornish, known as Jessie J (born 1988), British singer-songwriter
- Jessica Cottis (born 1979), Australian-British conductor
- Jessica Cox (born 1983), American pilot
- Jessica Cristina (born 1975), Puerto Rican merengue artist and pop singer
- Jessica Davenport (born 1985), American basketball player
- Jessica Degenhardt (born 2002), German luger
- Jessica De Gouw (born 1988), Australian actress
- Jessica Deglau (born 1980), Canadian swimmer
- Jessica DiCicco (born 1980), American actress
- Jessica DiGirolamo (born 1999), Canadian ice hockey player
- Jessica Dominguez, immigration lawyer based in California
- Jessica Drake (born 1974), American pornographic actress
- Jessica Dubé (born 1987), Canadian former competitive figure skater
- Jessica Dubroff (1988–1996), American pilot trainee
- Jessica Durlacher (born 1961), Dutch literary critic, columnist and novelist
- Jessica Eddie (born 1984), English rower
- Jessica Ellis (born 1987), British actress
- Jessica Ennis-Hill (born 1986), British athlete
- Jessica Enström (born 1977), Swedish handball player
- Jessica Sompong Espiner (born 1997), Thai actress
- Jessica Esquivel, Mexican and American physicist and science communicator
- Jessica Ewing, American innovator and entrepreneur
- Jessica Eye (born 1986), American mixed martial artist
- Jessica Falk (born 1973), Swedish singer-songwriter and musician
- Jessica Fay, American politician
- Jessica Feshbach (born 1975), American former Scientologist
- Jessica Fintzen, German mathematician
- Jessica M. Fishman, American author and behavioral scientist
- Jesica Fitriana (born 1995), Indonesian HIV/AIDS activist, furniture designer, model and beauty pageant titleholder
- Jessica Fodera (born 1975), American musician, singer and artist, known professionally as Jessicka
- Jessica Folcker (born 1975), Swedish singer
- Jessica Forrest (born 1990), British actress
- Jessica Fox (canoeist) (born 1994), French-Australian world and Olympic champion slalom canoer
- Jessica Fullalove (born 1996), British backstroke swimmer
- Jessica Gadirova (born 2004), English artistic gymnast
- Jessica Gagen (born 1996), English beauty pageant titleholder
- Jessica Gal (born 1971), Dutch judoka
- Jessica García (born 1980), Puerto Rican judoka
- Jessica Garlick (born 1981), Welsh singer
- Jessica Gaspar (born 1976), American professional basketball player
- Jessica Gaudreault (born 1994), Canadian water polo goalkeeper
- Jessica Glynne, better known as Jess Glynne (born 1989), English singer-songwriter
- Jessica Good (born 1994), Australian basketball player
- Jessica Gordon Brown (born 1995), English weightlifter
- Jessica Gomes (born 1985), Australian model
- Jessica Gonzalez (labor organizer) (born 1992 or 1993), American labor organizer
- Jessica González-Rojas (born 1976), American activist, politician, and academic
- Jessica Graf (born 1990), American reality television personality, actress, and model
- Jessica Gunning (born 1986), English actress
- Jessica Haines (born 1978), South African actress
- Jessica Hall (British actress) (born 1981), English actress
- Jessica Hammerl (born 1988), German ice hockey defender
- Jessica Hardy (born 1987), American competitive swimmer
- Jessica Harp (born 1982), American country singer-songwriter and guitarist
- Jessica Harrison-Hall (born 1965), British sinologist, curator and author
- Jessica Hawkins (born 1995), British racing driver and stunt driver
- Jessica Hayllar (1858–1940), British artist and painter
- Jessica Heeringa (1987–2013), American murder victim
- Jessica Helleberg (born 1986), Swedish handball player
- Jessica Hemmings, British academic and writer
- Jessica Hennig (born 1988), German politician
- Jessica Henwick (born 1992), English actress and writer
- Jessica Hewitt (born 1986), Canadian short track speed skater
- Jessica Hilzinger (born 1997), German alpine ski racer
- Jessica Hogg (born 1995), Welsh artistic gymnast
- Jessica Ho (rugby union) (born 1992), Hong Kong rugby union player
- Jessica Ho, known as Jessi (born 1988), American rapper, singer, and entertainer
- Jessica Ho, known as Sica (born 2000), Hong Kong singer, musician, stage actress and cosplayer
- Jessica Holmes (disambiguation), several people
- Jessica Hsuan (born 1970), Hong Kong actress
- Jessica Huntley (1927–2013), Guyanese-British activist and publisher
- Jessica Hynes (born 1972), British actress, writer and comedian
- Jessica Iskandar (born 1988), Indonesian actress and model
- Jessica Iwanson (born 1948), Swedish choreographer and artistic director
- Jessica Jaccoud (born 1983), Swiss politician
- Jessica Jackley (born 1977), American businesswoman and entrepreneur
- Jessica Jaymes (1979–2019), American pornographic actress
- Jessica Jerome (born 1987), American ski jumper
- Jessica Jislová (born 1994), Czech biathlete
- Jessica Jonassen (born 1992), Australian cricketer
- Jessica Leigh Jones (born 1994), Welsh engineer and astrophysicist
- Jessica Jordan (born 1984), Bolivian-British politician, model and beauty pageant titleholder
- Jessica Joseph (born 1982), American ice dancer
- Jessica Judd (born 1995), English middle- and long-distance runner
- Jessica Jung (born 1989), American-Korean pop singer
- Jessica Juste (born 1990), Hatian-American comedian
- Jessica Karlsson (born 1992), Swedish professional golfer
- Jessica Kellgren-Fozard (born 1989), English YouTuber
- Jessica Kingdon, Chinese American director and producer
- Jessica Kizaki (Japanese: 希崎ジェシカ) (born 1989), Japanese former AV actress
- Jessica Klimkait (born 1996), Canadian Judoka
- Jessica Knappett (born 1984), English comedy writer and actress
- Jessica Knoll, American magazine editor, novelist and screenwriter
- Jessica Kondas (born 2000), Canadian ice hockey player
- Jessica Korda (born 1993), Czech-American professional golfer
- Jessica Reed Kraus, American writer
- Jessica Krug (born c. 1982), American historian, author, and activist
- Jessica Kürten (born 1969), Irish equestrian
- Jessica Lange (born 1949), American actress
- Jessica Landström (born 1984), Swedish footballer
- Jessica Lapenn, American career member of the Senior Foreign Service
- Jessica Largey, American chef
- Jessica Larsson, Swedish two-time world champion bridge player
- Jessica Lee (disambiguation), several people
- Jessica Lee Rose (born 1987), American-New Zealand actress
- Jessica Liedberg (born 1969), Swedish actress
- Jessica Lindell-Vikarby (born 1984), Swedish World Cup alpine ski racer
- Jessica Linley (born 1989), English beauty pageant titleholder
- Jessica Mei Li (born 1995), English actress
- Jessica Lindstrom (born 1996), American professional basketball player
- Jesseca Liu (born 1979), Malaysian actress
- Jessica Long (born 1992), Russian-American Paralympic swimmer
- Jessica López (born 1986), Venezuelan artistic gymnast
- Jessica Lowndes (born 1988), Canadian actress and singer-songwriter
- Jessica Lu (born 1985), American actress
- Jessica Lucas (born 1985), Canadian actress and singer
- Jessica Lundy (born 1966), American actress
- Jessica Lynch (born 1983), American soldier, teacher and actress
- Jessica Lynch (Miss New York) (born 1979), American pageant contestant, Miss New York 2003
- Jessica Lynn (born 1990), American country music singer and songwriter
- Jessica Macaulay (born 1992), British and Canadian high diver
- Jessica Mager (born 1988), German sports shooter
- Jessica Mah (born 1990), American entrepreneur
- Jessica Malsiner (born 2002), Italian ski jumper
- Jessica Malone (born 1986), Australian judoka
- Jéssica Bouzas Maneiro (born 2002), Spanish tennis player
- Jessica Marais (born 1985), South African-born Australian actress
- Jessica Marasigan (born 1994), Filipino-American model, host, singer, actress, and beauty queen
- Jessica Martin (actor) (born 1962), British actress and comedian
- Jessica Martin (priest) (born 1963), British Anglican priest
- Jessica Mauboy (born 1989), Australian singer
- Jessica Millward (born 1973), American historian
- Jessica Nduku Kiko Mbalu, Kenyan politician
- Jessica Mbangeni (born 1977), South African praise poet and singer
- Jessica McCabe, American actress, writer, and YouTube personality
- Jessica McClain (born 1992), American middle-distance and long-distance runner
- Jessica McClure (born 1986), known as "Baby Jessica" when rescued from a well as a toddler
- Jessica Medina, American singer-songwriter
- Jessica Meir (born 1977), American astronaut, biologist, and underwater diver
- Jessica Mendoza (born 1980), American softball player and sportscaster
- Jessica Michibata (born 1984), Japanese fashion model
- Jessica Mitford (1917–1996), Anglo-American writer
- Jessica Mila (born 1992), Indonesian actress and model
- Jessica Moore (basketball) (born 1982), American basketball player
- Jessica Moore (journalist) (born 1982), American journalist
- Jessica Moore (tennis) (born 1990), Australian tennis player
- Jessica Morlacchi (born 1987), former member of Italian band Gazosa
- Jessica Morse (born 1982), American government official and politician
- Jessica Motaung (born 1973), South African television personality
- Jessica Murrey, American game developer and peacemaker
- Jessika Nash (born 2004), Australian footballer
- Jessica Nettelbladt (born 1972), Swedish director and documentary filmmaker
- Jessica Nigri (born 1989), American actress
- Jessica Nkosi (born 1990), South African actress
- Jessica Garza Montes de Oca (born 1984), Mexican actress, singer-songwriter and writer
- Jessica Olérs (born 1978), Swedish beauty pageant contestant, Miss Sweden 1998
- Jessica Opare-Saforo (born 1981), Ghanaian media personality, TV and radio broadcaster and entrepreneur
- Jessica Origliasso (born 1984), Australian musician
- Jessica Oyelowo (born 1978), British actress and singer
- Jessica Paré (born 1982), Canadian actress
- Jessica Park (born 2001), English professional footballer
- Jessica Parra (born 1995), Colombian professional racing cyclist
- Jessica Pasaphan (born 1988), Thai actress
- Jessica Pegula (born 1994), American tennis player
- Jessica Pengelly (born 1991), South African-born Australian swimmer
- Jessica Perlmutter (born 2009), American snowboarder
- Jessica Pickering (born 2001), Australian trampoline gymnast
- Jessica Pieri (born 1997), Italian tennis player
- Jessica Nery Plata (born 1994), Mexican professional boxer
- Jessica Plummer (born 1992), English actress and singer
- Jessica Polfjärd (born 1971), Swedish politician
- Jessica Pugh (born 1997), English badminton player
- Jéssica Quintino (born 1991), Brazilian handball player
- Jessica Raine (born 1982), English actress
- Jessica Ransom (born 1981), British actress and writer
- Jessica Rawson (born 1943), English art historian, curator and sinologist
- Jessica Regan (born 1982), Irish actress
- Jessica Kelly Siobhan Reilly, known as Kelly Reilly (born 1977), English actress
- Jessica Rich (snowboarder) (born 1990), Australian snowboarder
- Jessica Ridgeway (2002–2012), American murder victim
- Jessica Rivera (born 1974), American soprano
- Jessica Rivera (music executive)
- Jessica Roberts (born 1999), British cyclist
- Jessica Rodén (born 1976), Swedish politician
- Jessica Rodríguez (born 1981), Panamanian model and pageant titleholder
- Jessica Roland-Pratt (born 1982), Puerto Rican tennis player
- Jessica Rosencrantz (born 1987), Swedish politician
- Jessica Rosenthal (born 1992), German politician
- Jessica Rossi (born 1992), Italian sport shooter
- Jessica Rothe (born 1987), American actress
- Jessica Roux (born 1992), South African distance swimmer
- Jessica Ryde (born 1994), Swedish handball player
- Jessica Seobyn Ryu (born 2000), South Korean beauty queen; Miss Korea 2024
- Jessica Salazar (born 1995), Mexican track cyclist
- Jessica Samuelsson (heptathlete) (born 1985), Swedish heptathlete
- Jessica Sanchez (born 1995), American recording artist
- Jessica Savitch (1947–1983), American TV news reporter
- Jessica Scheel (born 1990), Guatemalan model and beauty pageant titleholder
- Jessica Schilder (born 1999), Dutch athlete
- Jessicah Schipper (born 1986), Australian competition swimmer
- Jessica Schmidt (born 1979), German chess Women Grandmaster
- Jessica Schülke (born 1984), German politician
- Jessica Schultz (born 1985), American curler
- Jessica Schwarz (born 1977), German film and TV actress
- Jessica Simpson (born 1980), American pop singer and actress
- Jessica Sklar (born 1973), American mathematician
- Jessica Smith (editor) (1895–1983), American editor and activist
- Jessica Smith (speed skater) (born 1983), American long track speed skater and short track speed skater
- Jessica Snow (born 1964), American abstract artist, filmmaker, curator, and professor
- Jessika Sobocińska (born 2001), Polish rower
- Jessica Soho (born 1964), Filipina broadcast journalist
- Jessica Spring, American letterpress printer, book artist
- Jessica Springsteen (born 1991), American equestrian
- Jessica Stam (born 1986), Canadian model
- Jessica Stasinowsky (born 1985), Australian convicted murderer
- Jessica Steck (born 1978), South African tennis player
- Jessica Steen (born 1965), Canadian actress
- Jessica Steffens (born 1987), American water polo player
- Jessica Stegrud (born 1970), Swedish politician
- Jessica Steiger (born 1992), German swimmer
- Jessica Steinhauser, known as Asia Carrera (born 1973), American pornographic actress
- Jessica Stenson (born 1987), Australian athlete
- Jessica Stevens (born 2000), American trampoline gymnast
- Jessica Stockholder (born 1959), Canadian-American artist
- Jessica Stretton (born 2000), British archer
- Jessica Stroup (born 1986), American actress and model
- Jessica Sula (born 1994), Welsh actress
- Jessica Sutta (born 1982), American dancer and singer
- Jessica Sutton (born 1993), South African actress
- Jessica Swale (born 1982), British playwright, theatre director and screenwriter
- Jessica Szohr (born 1985), American actress
- Jessica Tan (born 1966), Singaporean politician
- Jessica Tan (badminton) (born 1993), Singaporean badminton player
- Jessica Tandy (1909–1994), English-American actress
- Jessica Tatti (born 1981), German politician
- Jessica Taylor (disambiguation), several people
- Jessica Tejada (born 1971), Peruvian volleyball player
- Jessica Thunander (born 1973), Swedish politician
- Jessica Torny (born 1980), Dutch footballer
- Jessica Townsend (born 1985), Australian author
- Jessica Triebeľová (born 2001), Slovak boxer
- Jessica Salazar Trejo (born 1991), Mexican politician
- Jessica Trisko-Darden (born 1984), Canadian academic, activist, and model
- Jessica Tsoi, Hong Kong singer
- Jessica Turnbull (born 1995), Australian female squash player
- Jessica Upshaw (1959–2013), American politician and lawyer
- Jessica Utts (born 1952), American statistician
- Jessica van der Spil (born 1979), Dutch judoka
- Jessica Van Der Steen (born 1984), Belgian fashion model
- Jessica van Eijs (born 1981), Dutch politician
- Jessica Varnish (born 1990), British track cyclist
- Jessica Velasquez (born 1976 or 1977), American politician
- Jessica Vetter (born 1985), American ice hockey player
- Jessica Villarubin (born 1996), Filipino singer and performer
- Jessica von Bredow-Werndl (born 1986), German dressage rider
- Jessica Voorsanger (born 1965), American artist
- Jessica Vosk (born 1983), American actress and singer
- Jess Wade (born 1988), British physicist
- Jessica Wahls (born 1977), German pop singer
- Jessica Walsh (born 1986), American designer, art director, illustrator and educator
- Jessica Walter (1941–2021), American actress
- Jessica Watkins (born 1988), American astronaut, geologist, aquanaut and rugby player
- Jessica Watson (born 1993), Australian sailor
- Jessica Weintraub (born 2007), Australian rhythmic gymnast
- Jessica Weller (born 1983), German politician
- Jessica Wetterling (born 1986), Swedish politician
- Jessica White (born 1984), American model
- Jessica Wich (born 1990), German footballer
- Jessica Wik (born 1992), Swedish professional footballer
- Jessica Williams (actress) (born 1989), American actress and comedian
- Jessica Williams (musician) (1948–2022), American pianist and composer
- Jessica Wong (born 1991), Canadian ice hockey player
- Jessica Wright (disambiguation), several people
- Jessica Keenan Wynn (born 1986), American actress
- Jessica Xue (born 1994), Chinese radio host, model, and beauty pageant titleholder
- Jessica Yang (born 1990), Hong Kong professional tennis player
- Jessica Yaniv, Canadian transgender activist
- Jessica Yellin (born 1971), American journalist
- Jessica M. Young (1893–1961), American astronomer
- Jessica Yu (born 1966), American film director
- Jessica Zafra (born 1965), Filipina writer
- Jessica Zahedi (born 1978), German television presenter and journalist
- Jessica Zandén (born 1957), Swedish actress
- Jessica Zelinka (born 1981), Canadian pentathlete
- Jessica Zhu (born 1986), Chinese-American pianist

== People with the middle name ==
- Sarah Jessica Parker (born 1965), American actress, model, singer, and producer

== Fictional characters ==
- Jessica, a character in the film Scooby-Doo! Camp Scare
- Jessica, a recurring rival in the series Stitch!
- Jessica Andrews, character in The Karate Kid Part III
- Jessica (The Merchant of Venice), in William Shakespeare's The Merchant of Venice
- Jessica Cruz (Green Lantern), a superhero in DC Comics universe
- Jessica Darling, in a novel series by Megan McCafferty
- Jessica Day, in the sitcom New Girl
- Jessica Drew (Spider-Woman), a superhero in Marvel Comics
- Jessica Edwards, in the manga series and anime Legend of the Galactic Heroes
- Jessica Fletcher, in the American television mystery series Murder, She Wrote
- Jessica Hamby, in the HBO series True Blood
- Jessica Huang, one of the leading characters in the ABC comedy Fresh Off the Boat
- Jessica Hunter, recurring antagonist in the Dork Diaries book series
- Jessica Jones, a superhero in the Marvel Comics Universe
- Jessica Keynes, a character in the Miraculous World: New York - United Heroez special
- Jessica Lovejoy, in the American television comedy series The Simpsons
- Jessica Moore, in the TV series Supernatural
- Jessica Olson, from the 2010 Disney Channel Original film Starstruck
- Jessica Pearson, in the NBC drama series Suits
- Jessica Jane "Jessie" Pride, in the Toy Story animated film franchise
- Jessica Rabbit, in the Who Framed Roger Rabbit series
- Jessica Miriam Reeves, in the 2002 film Queen of the Damned
- Jessica Ruiz, in the television series The Electric Company
- Jessica Sanders, in the NBC science fiction drama Heroes
- Jessica Stanley, in the Twilight Saga written by Stephenie Meyer
- Jessica Stiehl, fictional character in the German soap opera Verbotene Liebe (Forbidden Love)
- Jessica Wakefield, in the Sweet Valley High and Sweet Valley Twins novels
- Jessica Warren, in the television series Bones
- Lady Jessica, in the Dune science fiction universe
- Jessica the Jazz Fairy, in the Rainbow Magic novel series
- Red Jessica, in the preschool animated series Jake and the Never Land Pirates

== See also ==
- Jessie (disambiguation)
- Jess (disambiguation)
- Baby Jessica case
- Jessica's Law
- Jessica (instrumental)
