= Tillyer =

Tillyer is a surname. Notable people with the surname include:

- Edgar Derry Tillyer (1881–1970), American astronomer, computer and lens designe
- William Tillyer (born 1938), British artist
