= AQAS =

German higher education accreditation organisation

Agency for Quality Assurance through Accreditation of Study Programs
- Abbreviation: AQAS
- Formation: 2002
- Type: NGO
- Purpose: Educational accreditation
- Location: Cologne, North Rhine-Westphalia, Germany
- Members: ENQA; European University Association; European Consortium for Accreditation; EQAR
- Website: www.aqas.de

The Agency for Quality Assurance through Accreditation of Study Programs (AQAS) is an independent non-profit organisation dedicated for the accreditation of higher education institutions in Germany. It is supported by more than 80 member institutions, both higher education institutions as well as academic associations. AQAS was founded in 2002 and is headquartered in Cologne, North Rhine-Westphalia, Germany. To date it has accredited more than 3,500 degree programs at universities and universities of applied sciences, including numerous programs outside of Germany. In January 2009, the German Accreditation Council granted permission to AQAS to accredit quality assurance systems of higher education institutions as well.

The agency is member in various international education networks: The European University Association, the European Consortium for Accreditation, the European Network for Quality Assurance, and the European Quality Assurance Register for Higher Education.

== Accredited institutions ==
Currently, AQAS has accredited around 80 higher education institutions from several countries including Germany, Austria, Chile, China, Switzerland, Ghana, Indonesia, and the United Kingdom, among them:

- HTW Berlin
- Paris-Sorbonne University
- San Sebastián University
- State University of Surabaya
- Tongji University
- University of Cologne
- University of Florence
- University of Ghana
- University of Graz
- University of Hagen
- mass communication of Cairo university
- İstanbul Gelişim University
- European University of Lefke

== See also ==
- Association to Advance Collegiate Schools of Business
- European Quality Improvement System
- Accreditation, Certification, Quality Assurance Institute
- Association of MBAs
- Association to Advance Collegiate Schools of Business
- Triple accreditation
