= Thomas Götz =

German diplomat

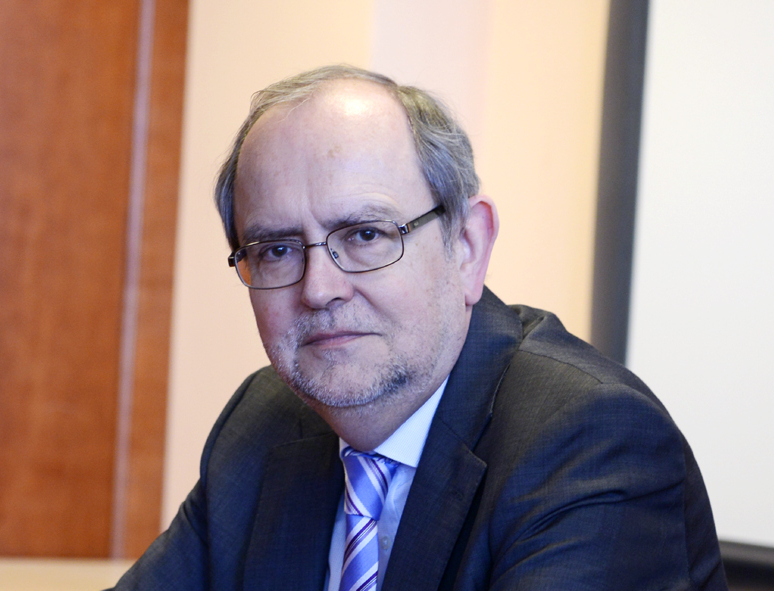
Thomas Götz

Thomas Götz (born 1953) is a senior German diplomat who has been serving as the Ambassador of Germany to the Kingdom of Norway since July 2016.

== Early life and education ==
Götz was born in Schwäbisch Gmünd.

After graduating from Parler-Gymnasium in Schwäbisch Gmünd in 1972 and his military service, he took up his studies of German, English and American literature and linguistics at the University of Tübingen. In 1976 he attended Newcastle University in Newcastle upon Tyne. In 1979 he graduated from the University of Tübingen and started a traineeship as a teacher in Stuttgart. In 1998 his PhD dissertation was accepted by the University of Hagen.

== Diplomatic career ==
He joined the Foreign Service in 1980; after finishing his diplomatic training at the Foreign Office in Bonn he worked as a junior diplomat at the Federal Chancellery from 1982 to 1983 serving both Chancellor Helmut Schmidt and Chancellor Helmut Kohl.

Later his diplomatic postings abroad included Hong Kong, Tokyo, Bucharest, Geneva and Athens. At headquarters he developed expertise for research and academic relations policy and was the Ministry's Deputy Director-General for Culture and Communications from 2008 to 2011. At the same time he served as the vice-chair of the German-American Fulbright-Programme.

He was appointed Ambassador to Finland in 2011 and to the Slovak Republic in 2014. From 2016 to 2018 Götz served as the Ambassador of Germany to the Kingdom of Norway in Oslo. Since then he has been living in Berlin and is active as an author and editor.

== Personal life ==
Ambassador Götz was bestowed with the Order of the Phoenix by the President of Greece in 2002 and received an Honorary Doctorate through the Åbo Akademi – the Swedish University in Turku, Finland in 2014.

His personal interests include literature, music, and biking.

He has been married to Claudia Götz since 1983; the couple has one grown-up daughter.

== Publications ==
- Die brüchige Idylle : Peter Huchels Lyrik zwischen Magie und Entzauberung, Dissertation Fernuniversität Hagen, 1998, ISBN 3-631-34117-2.
- Camillo Sbarbaro, Pianissimo, Übersetzt von Gio Batta Bucciol und Thomas Götz, Tübingen, 2000, ISBN 3-8233-4060-3.
- Orte Spuren Zeiten, Gedichte, Norderstedt, 2021, ISBN 978-3-7543-3265-8.
- Ein Hauch von wildem Mohn - Unterwegs in Griechenland, Gedichte, Hamburg 2026, ISBN 978-3696334079.
