= Jessica M. Young =

American astronomer

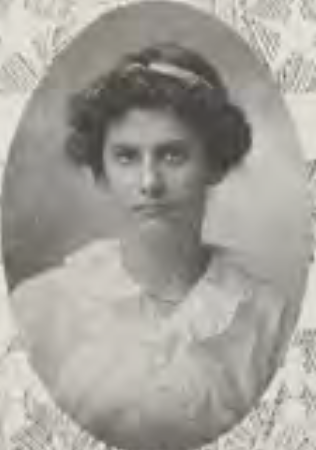
- Jessica May Young, from the 1915 yearbook of Washington University
- Born: Jessica May Young; March 21, 1893; Saint Louis, Missouri, U.S.
- Died: June 15, 1961 (aged 68); Haverford, Pennsylvania, U.S.
- Other names: Jessica Young Stephens
- Occupation(s): Astronomer, mathematician, college professor

Jessica May Young Stephens (March 21, 1893 – June 15, 1961) was an American astronomer. She was a professor at Washington University in St. Louis from 1924 to 1958. Her research involved computing the orbits of comets.

== Early life and education ==
Young was from Saint Louis, Missouri, the daughter of Louis Charles Young and Lillian Van Arsdale Young. Her mother was a physician and her father worked in a printing business. She had an older sister, Harriett.

Young graduated from Yeatman High School. She finished a bachelor's degree at Washington University in 1914, and earned a master's degree in astronomy and physics there in 1915. Her master's thesis was titled "On the cause of the non-appearance of certain periodic comets on their predicted returns." She completed doctoral studies in astronomy at the University of California, Berkeley, in 1921, with a dissertation titled "The Galactic Rotation Effect in Open Clusters". She was the fourth woman to earn a Ph.D. in astronomy at Berkeley, after Phoebe Waterman Haas (1913), Anna Estelle Glancy (1913), and Sophia Levy (1920).

== Career ==
Young was appointed as a fellow at the Lick Observatory in 1916. She presented a paper at the Astronomical Society of the Pacific meeting in 1916, and published her research in the society's journal. In 1921, she attended the American Association for the Advancement of Science meeting held in Toronto, one of the eleven women members present. She began teaching at Washington University in 1920; in 1924, she was appointed assistant professor of mathematics and astronomy. In 1958, she was promoted to the rank of associate professor, and she was the first woman to retire from the faculty as Associate Professor Emeritus. She gave public lectures on astronomy topics, and organized viewing groups on campus for eclipses and other sky events. Late in life, she taught at North Carolina A&M College.

== Publications ==
- "Notes on the Orbit of the Visual Binary, A 570" (1922)
- "Section D (Astronomy) of the A.A.A.S. at St. Louis, Missouri" (1936)
- "A definitive orbit of the visual binary star, OΣ 298" (1939)
- "Study of the orbits computed for Comet 1889 VI" (1948)

== Personal life ==
Young married mathematics professor Eugene Stephens, in 1932. Physicist William Edwards Stephens was Eugene's son from his first marriage. Her husband died in 1957, and she died in 1961, in Haverford, Pennsylvania, at the age of 68.
