= Gessica =

Gessica and Géssica are, respectively, the Italian and Portuguese equivalents of the English name Jessica. Notable people with the name include:

- Géssica do Nascimento (born 1991), Brazilian footballer
- Gessica Généus (born 1985), Haitian actor, filmmaker, singer and author
- Gessica Rostellato (born 1982), Italian politician
- Gessica Turato (born 1984), Italian road cyclist
