= Jessica Taylor (disambiguation) =

Jessica Taylor (born 1980) is an English singer who was a member of Liberty X.

Jessica Taylor may also refer to:

- Jessica Taylor (author), British author
- Jessica Taylor (athlete) (born 1988), British track and field athlete
- Jessica Taylor (died 2003), victim of the Long Island serial killer
- Jessica Taylor, candidate in the 2020 United States House of Representatives elections in Alabama
