= State University of Surabaya =

Public university in Surabaya, Indonesia

Surabaya State University
- Universitas Negeri Surabaya (in Indonesian); ꦈꦤꦶꦮ꦳ꦼꦂꦱꦶꦠꦱ꧀ꦤꦼꦒꦼꦫꦶꦱꦸꦫꦧꦪ (in Javanese)
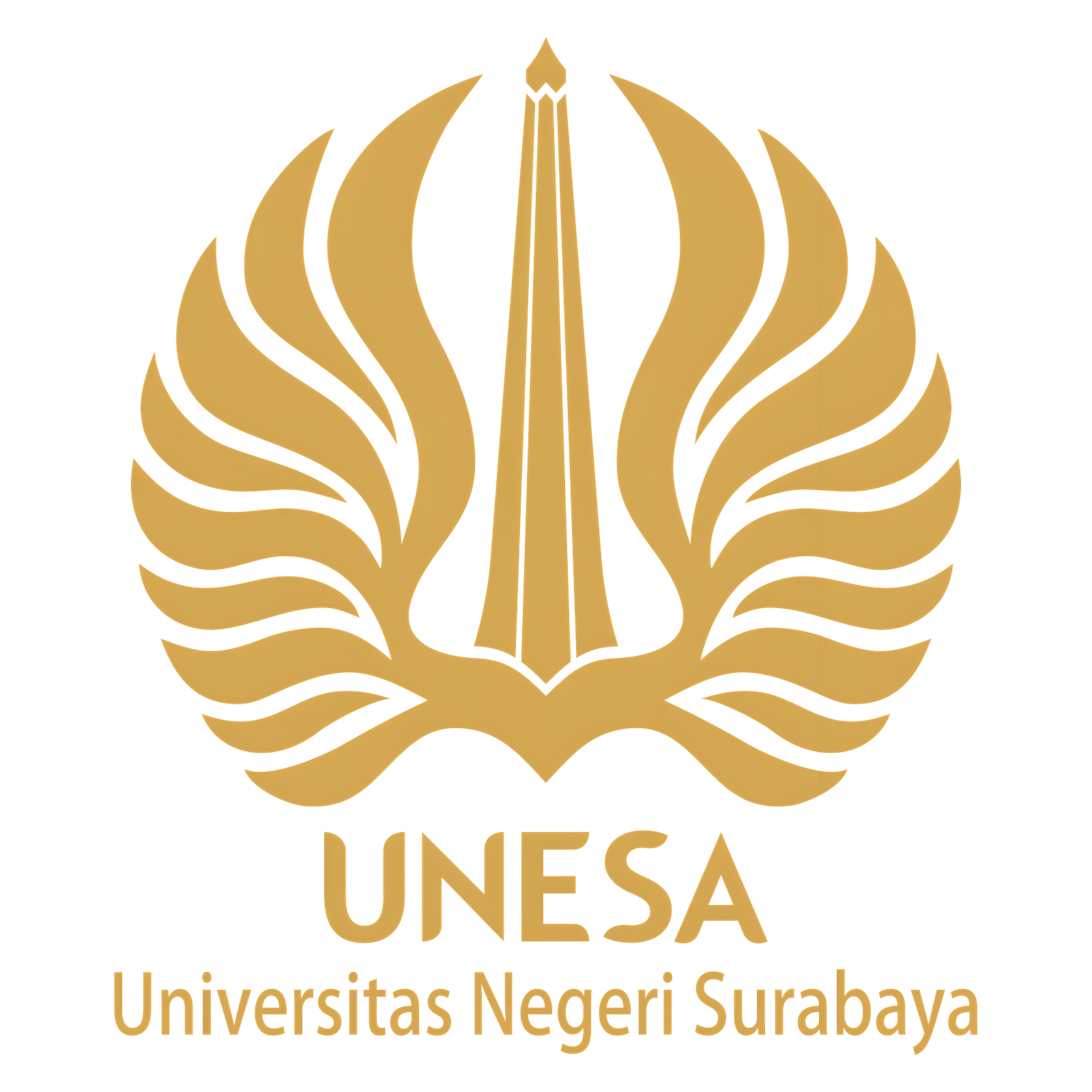
- Official emblem
- Former names: Institut Keguruan dan Ilmu Pendidikan Surabaya (lit. 'Institute of Teaching and Education Sciences of Surabaya')
- Motto in English: Growing with Character
- Type: Public
- Established: 1950; 76 years ago; 19 December 1964; 61 years ago (as an independent higher education)
- Affiliations: AQAS
- Rector: Prof. Dr. H. Nurhasan, M.Kes.
- Faculty: 834
- Students: 31.364
- Location: Lidah Wetan Campus: Jl. Rektorat Unesa, Lidah Wetan, Kec. Lakarsantri, 60213; Ketintang Campus: Jl. Ketintang, Ketintang, Kec. Gayungan, 60231, Surabaya, East Java, Indonesia
- Campus: * Lidah Wetan Campus (in West Surabaya); Ketintang Campus (in South Surabaya)
- Colours: Blue and Gold
- Nickname: Unesa
- Website: https://en.unesa.ac.id/
- Main campus (Ketintang) location

The State University of Surabaya or Surabaya State University (Indonesian: Universitas Negeri Surabaya; Javanese: ꦈꦤꦶꦮ꦳ꦼꦂꦱꦶꦠꦱ꧀ꦤꦼꦒꦼꦫꦶꦱꦸꦫꦧꦪ; abbreviated as Unesa, Javanese pronunciation: [ʊnɛsʌ]) is a public university located in Surabaya, a metropolitan city in northeastern coastal region of Java Island. It is one of the top universities in Indonesia and has been accredited internationally based on the Standards and Guidelines for Quality Assurance in the European Higher Education Area (ESG). It is the top 3 public universities in the capital of East Java, along with the Airlangga University and Sepuluh Nopember Institute of Technology.

== History ==
UNESA was formerly known as The Institute of Teaching and Education Sciences of Surabaya (Indonesian: Institut Keguruan dan Ilmu Pendidikan Surabaya; abbreviated as IKIP Surabaya).
It started for graduating teachers, qualified for preschool, elementary, junior high, and senior high school. Now UNESA has seven faculties and one graduate school, 47 undergraduate programs, 12 diploma programs, and 15 postgraduate and doctorate programs. It has approximately 31,364 students and 834 lecturers (244 undergraduates, 470 postgraduates, 76 doctoral, and 27 professors).

In 1950, UNESA was founded from B-I and B-II courses majoring in Chemical Sciences and Exact Sciences to ensure the availability of junior and senior high school teachers.. It used classrooms and laboratories belonging to the Dutch Hogere burgerschool (HBS). In 1957, these B-I courses were grouped into General B-I Courses and Special B-I Courses. The General B-I Courses included English and German languages, while the Special B-I Courses included Chemical Sciences, Exact Sciences, Economics, Technical, Sports, and Aeronautical Sciences.

In 1960, the B-I and B-II courses were integrated into Faculty of Education and Teacher Training (Indonesian: Fakultas Keguruan dan Ilmu Pendidikan or FKIP) to graduate advanced school teachers. In 1961, this was absorbed into FKIP Universitas Airlangga Cabang Malang and named FKIP Universitas Airlangga Cabang Surabaya. January 3, 1963, FKIP and the Institute of Teacher Training (founded in 1962) was merged with IKIP Malang Cabang Surabaya.

December 19, 1964, IKIP Surabaya was officially established with five faculties: Education, Social Teaching, Language Art Teaching, Exact Science Teaching, and Engineering Sciences Teaching. In 1977, the Faculty of Sports Science Teaching became the sixth. That year, five of the six faculties changed their names to the Faculty of Languages and Art, Faculty of Mathematics and Natural Sciences, Faculty of Social Sciences, Faculty of Engineering, and Faculty of Sport Sciences.

Through a Presidential Regulation dated August 4, 1999, IKIP Surabaya changed its name to Universitas Negeri Surabaya. In 2006, UNESA opened a new Faculty of Economics as a separate entity from its parent faculty, Social Sciences. In 2014, UNESA opened two departments, Communication Sciences under the Faculty of Social Sciences, and Islamic Economics under the Faculty of Economics.

UNESA has two main campuses in Ketintang and Lidah Wetan, a supporting campus for Department of Extraordinary Education in Gedangan, Sidoarjo, two language centers in Ketintang Campus and Dr. Moestopo, and laboratory schools for education-based programs, including a kindergarten, an elementary school and two middle schools. UNESA is known as an inclusive campus, which means disabled students can study along with the able-bodied students. It has a study and service center for disabled people, and provides assistance for disabled people in Surabaya, especially in the campus.

== Campuses ==
The State University of Surabaya currently has two main campuses, namely the Ketintang Campus and Lidah Wetan Campus complexes.

=== Ketintang Campus ===
The Ketintang Campus historically served as the main campus of the university back in the 1950s to 1990s before it was split into two campuses. Currently, the Ketintang Campus has four faculties, such as the Faculty of Economics and Business, Faculty of Engineering, Faculty of Mathematics and Natural Sciences, as well as the Faculty of Social and Law Sciences.

=== Lidah Wetan Campus ===
The Lidah Wetan Campus complex, or colloquially also abbreviated as the Liwet Campus serves as the current main campus of the university and it is surrounded by another supporting Unesa's facilitation complex, such as the university swimming pool area, Graha Unesa (a designated convention hall for convocation or graduation), etc. Currently, it has three faculties such as the Faculty of Education, Faculty of Languages and Arts, as well as the Faculty of Sports Sciences.

== Faculties and departments ==
In the Surabaya State University, the faculties are natively known as fakultas (from Latin facultas) and the departments known as jurusan (from Javanese ꦗꦸꦫꦸꦱꦤ꧀ 'jurusan'). Unesa currently has seven Faculties and Postgraduate programs, four Faculties in the Ketintang Campus complex, meanwhile, three other faculties located in the Lidah Wetan Campus complex.

- Faculty of Economics and Business
  - Department of Economics Education
  - Department of Managements
  - Department of Accounting
  - Department of Islamic Economics
- Faculty of Education
  - Department of Guidance and Counseling
  - Department of Education Technology
  - Department of Non-Formal Education
  - Department of Special Education
  - Department of Pre and Elementary school
  - Department of Psychology
  - Department of Early Childhood Teacher Training Education
  - Department of Education Management
- Faculty of Languages and Arts
  - Department of Indonesian Education
  - Department of English Education
  - Department of German Education
  - Department of Japanese Education
  - Department of Javanese Education
  - Department of Mandarin Education
  - Department of Drawing Art Education
  - Department of Dancing Art Education
  - Department of Indonesian literature
  - Department of English literature
  - Department of English Business
  - Department of German literature
- Faculty of Mathematics and Natural Sciences
  - Department of Mathematics Education
  - Department of Physics Education
  - Department of Chemistry Education
  - Department of Biology Education
  - Department of Sciences Education
  - Department of Mathematics
  - Department of Physics
  - Department of Chemistry
  - Department of Biology
- Faculty of Social and Law Sciences
  - Department of Pancasila and Citizenship Education
  - Department of Geography Education
  - Department of History Education
  - Department of Sociology
  - Department of State Administration Science
  - Department of Law Science
  - Department of Communication Science
- Faculty of Engineering
  - Department of Electrical Engineering Education
  - Department of Mechanical Engineering Education
  - Department of Building Engineering Education
  - Department of Family Welfare Education
  - Department of Make up Education
  - Department of Civil Engineering
  - Department of Mechanical Engineering
  - Department of Electrical Engineering
- Faculty of Sports Sciences
  - Department of Sport Science
  - Department of Health and Recreation Education
  - Department of Sport Coaching Education

== Partnerships ==
The State University of Surabaya has international partnerships worldwide, such as:

- Central China Normal University (China)
- Hat Yai University (Thailand)
- Islamic Science University (Malaysia)
- Kaichi International University (Japan)
- Khon Kaen University (Thailand)
- Kwame Nkrumah University of Science and Technology (Ghana)
- Prince of Songkla University (Thailand)
- Science University (Malaysia)
- Tun Hussein Onn University (Malaysia)
- Technology University of MARA (Malaysia)
- United States Agency for International Development (United States of America)
- University of Alicante (Spain)
- University of Kent (United Kingdom)
- Walailak University (Thailand)

== Student life ==
=== Demographics ===
As a university located in international port city of Surabaya, the students of Surabaya State University are very diverse ethnically and culturally, it may include all ethnic groups of Indonesian origin as well as international (non-native Indonesians) origin background, with Javanese being the largest ethnic in the university.

=== Languages ===
As Surabaya is the native homeland of Javanese, the spoken language in the university tend to be more dominated by the speakers of Surabaya Javanese (a dialect of Javanese uniquely native to Surabaya). Known for its multilingualism, Indonesians (which in this case also including the students of Surabaya State University) are also able to communicate in Indonesian (the national language of Indonesia), English (as an international intermediate language), and another ethnic languages. However, in classes, the spoken languages are heavily emphasized on Indonesian (Standard Indonesian) and English (Standard English), but in International Class programs specifically, English used as the main spoken language.

Besides English, another (non-native) languages are also spoken by the students in respective faculties and departments (especially in the Faculty of Languages and Arts), such as German (Standard German), Japanese (Standard Japanese), Chinese (Mandarin/Standard Chinese), etc.
