= University of Hagen =

German university

- FernUniversität in Hagen
- Type: Public
- Established: 1974
- Affiliations: European Association of Distance Teaching Universities; ACQUIN; AQAS; FIBAA; EUA
- Rector: Stefan Stürmer
- Faculty: 1,824
- Students: 69,982 (winter semester 2022/23)
- Location: Hagen, North Rhine-Westphalia, Germany; 51°22′38″N 7°29′43″E
- Campus: Urban Distance education
- Colors: Blue and white
- Website: www.fernuni-hagen.de

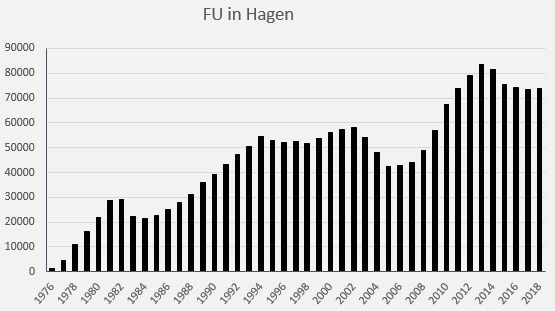
Count of students from 1976 to 2017

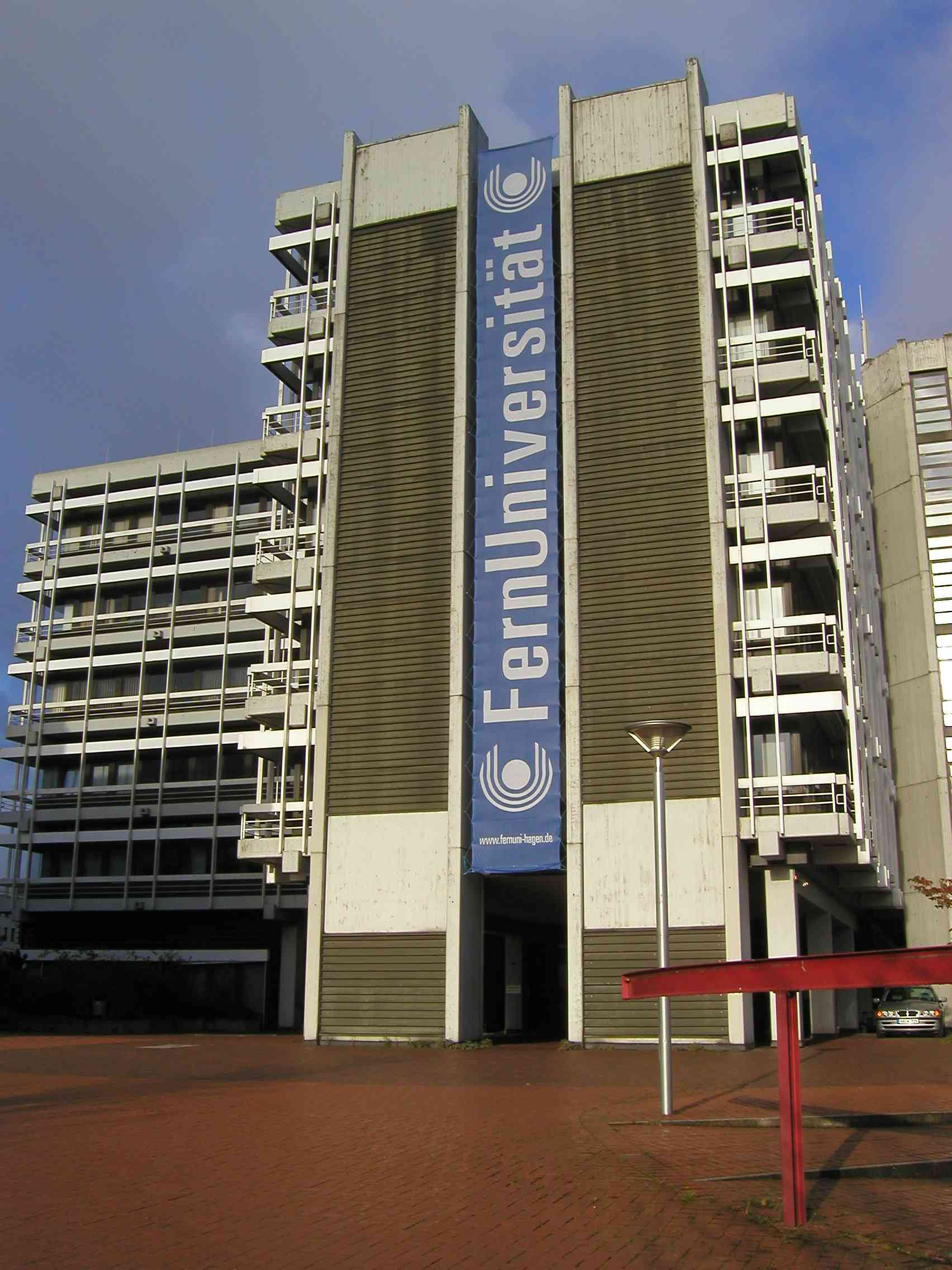
One of FU Hagen's main buildings located in Hagen

The University of Hagen (German: FernUniversität in Hagen, informally often referred to as FU Hagen) is a public research university that is primarily focused on distance teaching. While its main campus is located in Hagen, North Rhine-Westphalia, Germany, the university maintains more than 50 study and research centers in Germany and throughout Europe. According to the Federal Statistical Office of Germany, it is Germany's largest university. The university was founded in 1974 as a public research university by the state Nordrhein-Westfalen and began its research and teaching activities in 1975. It was founded following the idea of UK's Open University to provide higher and continuing education opportunities through a distance education system in Germany.

The university awards the same qualifications as other German on-campus universities and maintains the same requirements. Initially, the university had only three faculties with 1,304 full and part-time students, but today the university has developed into Germany's leading institution for distance education and is the only full university in that field with a student body of 83,536 students in the summer term of 2013 and 86,889 students in the winter term 2013/14. Besides the substantial number of off-campus students, a considerable number of full-time postgraduate research students as well as more than 1,800 members of academic and research staff are based on the University of Hagen's main campus in Hagen.

The faculties of the University of Hagen award undergraduate, graduate and postdoctoral degrees and enable habilitation. All the degrees awarded by the University of Hagen are equivalent to those awarded by traditional German universities. The University of Hagen awards degrees and does research in the fields of business administration and economics, mathematics, computer science, law, psychology, cultural studies and political science. The university has produced many notable alumni in the fields of law, economics, business and politics, among them two Gottfried Wilhelm Leibniz Prize winners, 1 Gossen Prize laureate, at least 25 university professors, numerous members of the German parliament, and the former Foreign Minister and Vice Chancellor of Germany, Guido Westerwelle.

The University of Hagen is a member of the European University Association (EUA), European Association of Distance Teaching Universities (EADTU) and it is accredited by ACQUIN, FIBAA (Foundation for International Business Administration Accreditation) as well as AQAS (Agentur für Qualitätssicherung durch Akkreditierung von Studiengängen).

== History ==
Lifelong learning, further education concurrent with work, along with the necessity to relieve the overcrowded on-campus universities have been important topics in the early 1970s. All this inspired the then minister of Higher Education and Research of the state North Rhine Westphalia to establish a public research university at Hagen dedicated to distance teaching. Under the NRW-Foundation Law of 1 December 1974 the "pioneers" from academia and administration had only ten months for preparing the new university, so that 1,300 students could embark on their studies from winter academic term 1975/76. The two academic departments of economics and mathematics were soon joined by business administration, education, cultural sciences, social sciences and humanities, as well as electrical engineering, information technology, law and computer science. After some restructuring, these subject areas have been organised into five faculties. The first study centres in North Rhine-Westphalia started operating simultaneously with the FernUniversität.

According to the Bologna Process every course offered by the university has been transformed to bachelor's and master's degrees. The transformation was finished in 2010. Due to the transformation a sharp rise in the number of students was observable, e.g. 3,400 new students seeking a bachelor's degree in psychology enrolled in 2009.

== Organisation and administration ==
=== Governance ===
The Rectorate is the 'executive body' of the university, headed by rector Helmut Hoyer. The rectorate consists of the chancellor, Regina Zdebel, who is the head of the central administration and responsible for the university's budgeting, and three pro-rectors, who are responsible for international relations, teaching and communication, and research and structure respectively.

The Senate is the 'legislative branch' of the university. The rector and the members of the rectorate are senators ex officio, as are also the deans of the faculties, and the university's equal opportunities officer. Another 20 senators are elected for four-year terms, within the following quotas: eight university professors; four academic staff; four delegates of the student body; and four employees of the university administration.

The University Council is the advisory board to the aforementioned entities. Amongst others its members include many CEOs of German industries, it formerly also included the late President of Germany Johannes Rau.

=== Faculties ===
Since a 2006 structural reformation, the university consists of five faculties, which in turn comprise several disciplines, departments, and institutes. As a consequence of the Bologna process, most faculties now offer Bachelor's, Master's, and PhD degrees to comply with the new European degree standard. A notable exception is the undergraduate program in law, from which students still graduate with the Staatsexamen (state examination), a central examination at Master's level held by the State of North Rhine-Westphalia. Each of the faculties is headed by a dean and a faculty council overseeing the research and teaching conducts.

The university is organised into five faculties:

- Faculty of Cultural and Social Sciences
- Faculty of Mathematics and Computer Science
- Faculty of Business Administration and Economics
- Faculty of Law
- Faculty of Psychology

== Campus and study centers ==
Initially, FernUniversität's departments were housed in rented apartments and buildings located all over Hagen and even outside the city. The development of FernUniversität's campus near the roadways A 45 and A 46 began in 1980 with the first office building Allgemeines Verfügungszentrum (AVZ I). Since the first building constructed several further buildings followed and increased the university campus, among them: The Eugen-Schmalenbach-Building (AVZ II), the Philipp-Reis-Building, the Centre of Technology and Innovation (TGZ), the extension of the University Library, and the new canteen. As more and more university buildings are concentrated on the Campus, it has become easier for the academic staff of different academic areas to cooperate and engage in cross-disciplinary research.

Furthermore, as a distance university, the University of Hagen operates numerous regional and study centers located across Germany and in other European countries, which are an important aspect of the university's blended learning concept. At these regional and study centers, students attend mandatory seminars and preparatory classes for exams, study together with other students, borrow books, and find mentors. Today, the university has more than 50 study centres within Germany and cooperates intensively with several other renowned institutions, such as Karlsruhe Institute of Technology, Goethe University Frankfurt, Johannes Kepler University Linz or the University of Jena to broaden their teaching options and research.

=== Germany ===
North Rhine-Westphalia

- Bonn (regional center)
- Euskirchen
- Coesfeld (regional center)
- Borken
- Herford
- Lüdinghausen
- Rheine
- Hagen (regional center)
- Arnsberg
- Bottrop
- Brilon
- Castrop-Rauxel
- Neuss (regional center)
- Eschweiler
- Krefeld
- Wesel
- Minden

Saarland

- Saarbrücken (operated by Saarland University)

Saxony

- Leipzig

Thuringia

- Erfurt (operated by University of Jena)

Baden-Württemberg

- Karlsruhe (operated by Karlsruhe Institute of Technology)
- Stuttgart (regional center)
- Schwäbisch Gmünd
- Villingen-Schwenningen

Bavaria

- Munich
- Nuremberg

Berlin

- Berlin (regional center)

Hamburg

- Hamburg (regional center)

Hesse

- Frankfurt/Main (operated by Goethe University Frankfurt)
- Bad Hersfeld

Lower Saxony

- Hanover (regional center)

=== Other countries ===
Austria

- Bregenz (operated by Johannes Kepler University Linz)
- Linz
- Steyr
- Vienna
- Saalfelden
- Villach

Switzerland

- Zürich (operated by University of Zurich)

Russia

- Smolensk

Hungary

- Budapest

Latvia

- Riga

== Academics ==
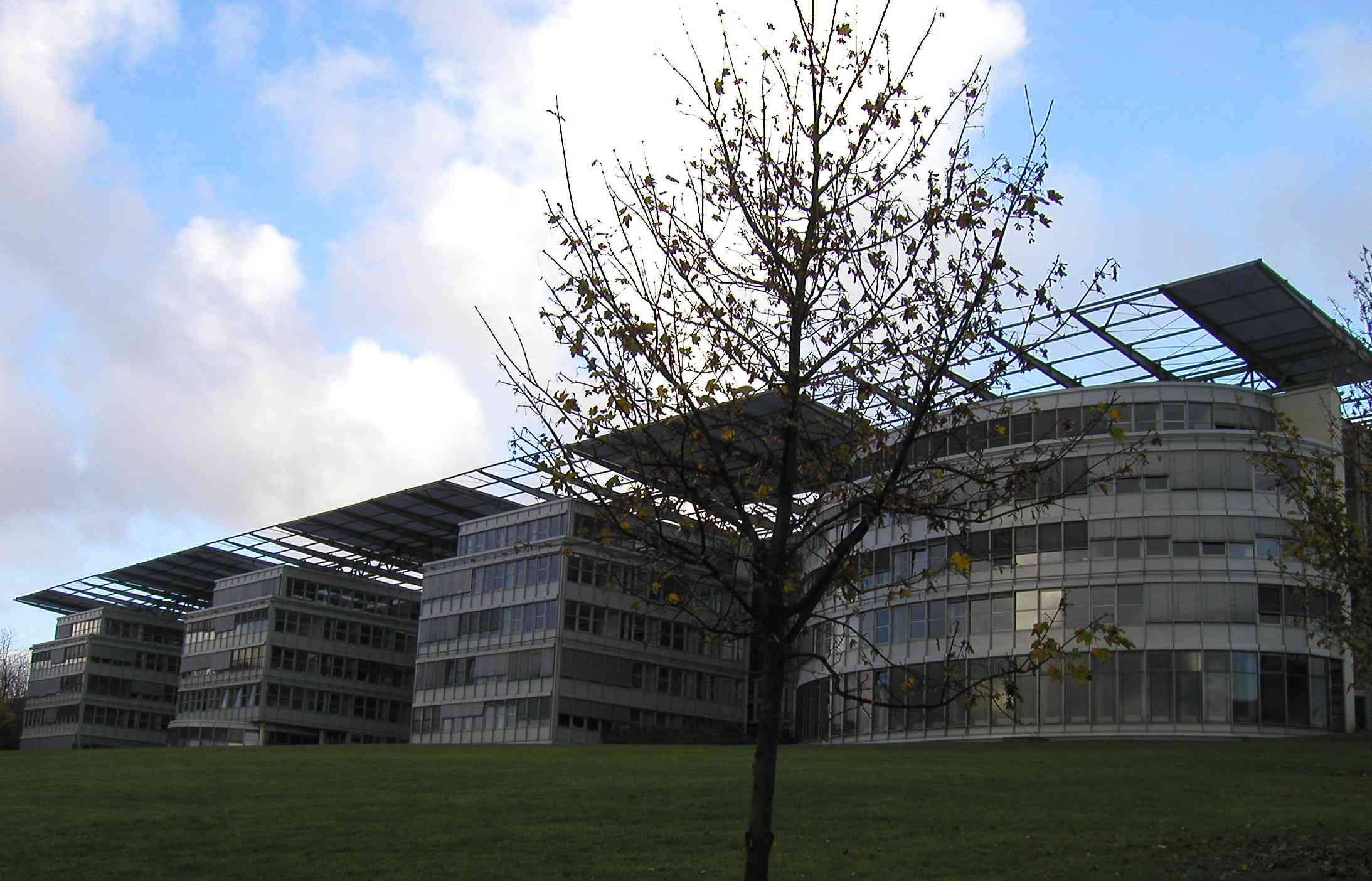
Building of the computer science institutes (Informatikzentrum)

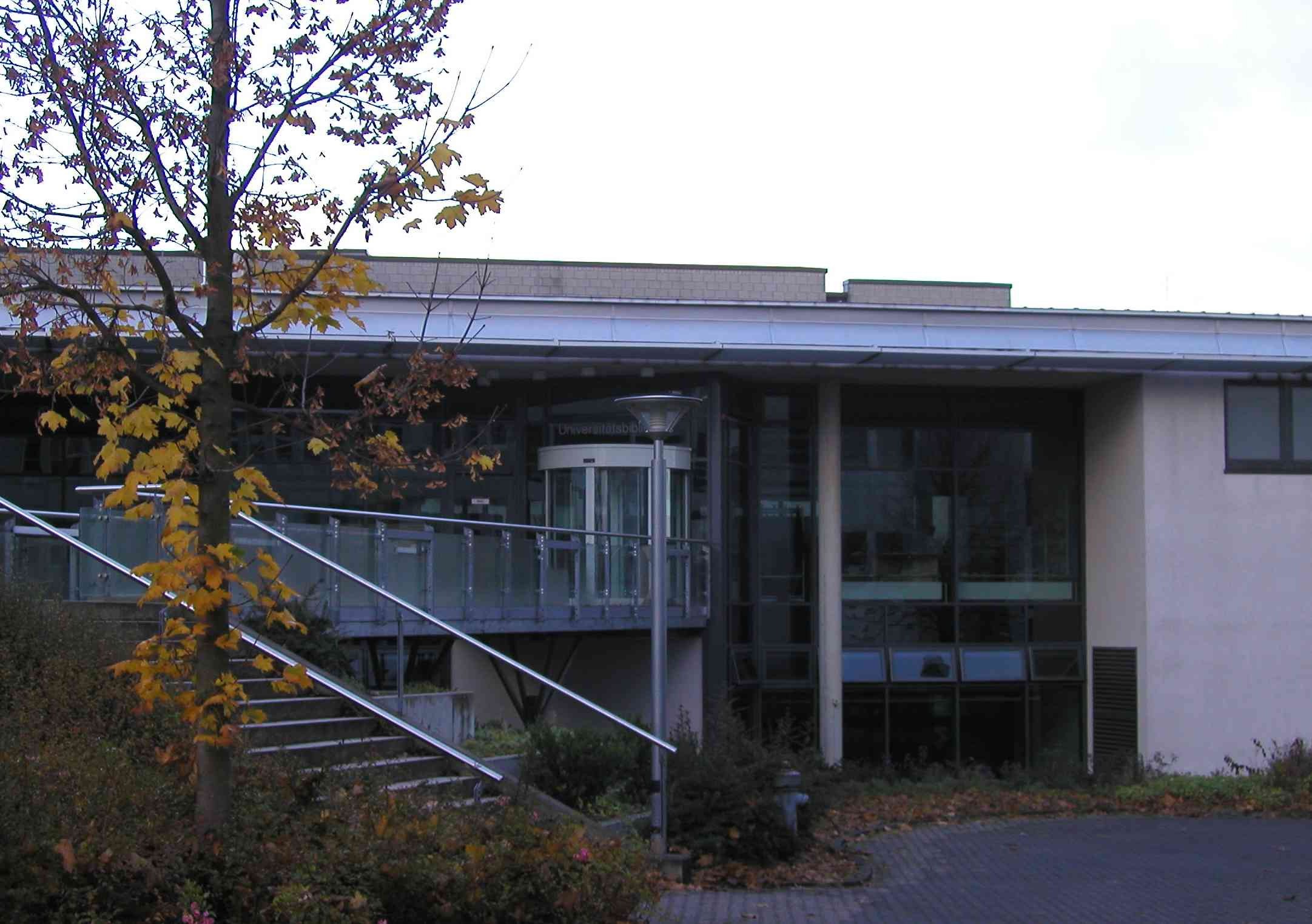
The university library

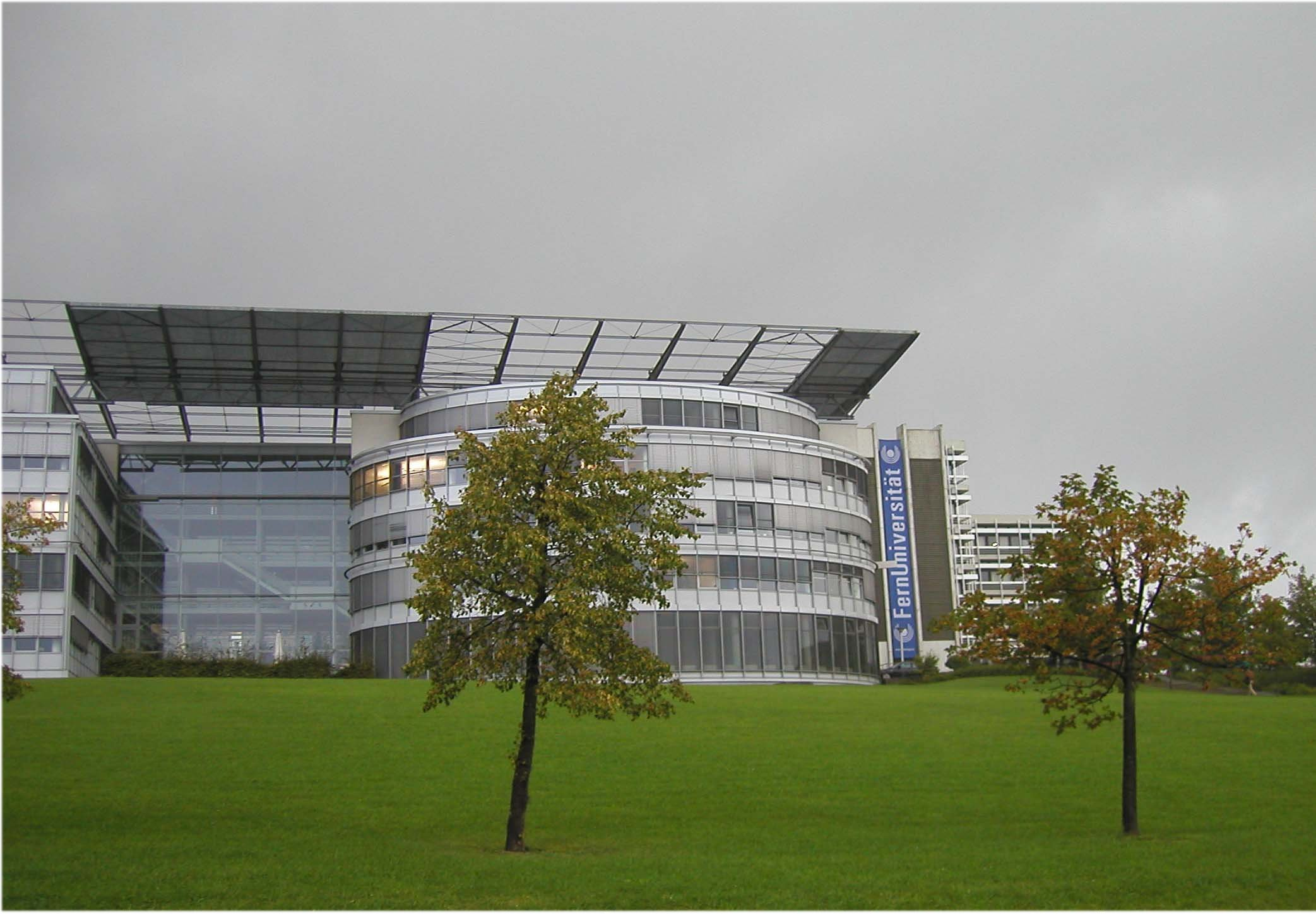
Center of Technology and Entrepreneurship

The University of Hagen provides the opportunity to study for a PhD on a part-time as distance option, or a full-time on-Campus basis in all of its disciplines offered. The university also offers a range of Master's levels modules such as the MBA, MSc and M.A., as well as the German Staatsexamen for its law degree.

Unlike German campus universities, degree awarding ceremonies at the University of Hagen are not graduation ceremonies as such, but instead University of Hagen graduates normally graduate in absentia at a joint meeting of the university's Council and Senate ("Congregation") which takes place at a meeting entirely separate from the degree ceremony.

=== Organisation and length of courses ===
The academic year is divided into two semesters. The winter semester runs from 1 October – 31 March and the summer semester from 1 April – 30 September. Online and self-study courses are held from mid-October to mid-February and mid-April to mid-July. Additionally, the University of Hagen offers presence classes and special seminars, some of which are required to graduate successfully. Students can generally begin their studies in the winter or in the summer semester. The standard time required to finish a Bachelor's degree's course load of 180 ECTS in full-time study is set at six semesters. The overall period of study for an undergraduate degree is divided into two parts: a period of basic study, equalling a course load of four semesters, at the end of which students must sit a formal examination, and a period of advanced study, equalling the course load of two semesters, after which students take their final examinations. Master's degrees, if done as full-time study, usually equalling the course load of four semesters. However, since a large proportion of the student body at the University of Hagen is studying part-time, the regular study time can deviate. The normal duration of PhD programs for full-time students is 6 semesters.

== Research ==
FTK – Research Institute for Telecommunication and Cooperation which is maintained by the University of Hagen and the University of Wuppertal

The University of Hagen supports focus- and profile-oriented research. Interdisciplinary and cross-faculty collaboration leads to the grouping together of competencies and to the formation of competitive research focal points. At the same time, basic and applied research is the basis for promoting the new generation of academics.

=== Research Institutes ===
- FIRM – Forschungsinstitut für rechtliches Informationsmanagement (Research Institute for Legal Informationmanagement)
- FTB – Forschungsinstitut Technologie und Behinderung (Research Center for Technology and Disabilities)
- FTK – Forschungsinstitut für Telekommunikation (Research Institute for Telecommunication)
- HIMS – Hagener Institut für Managementstudien e.V. (Hagener Institute for Management Studies)
- IKS – Institut für kooperative Systeme (Institute for Cooperative Systems)
- IWW – Institut für Wirtschaftswissenschaftliche Forschung und Weiterbildung GmbH (Institute for Economic Research and Training)
- TestDaF-Institut (Institute for Market Research)

=== Spin-offs ===
- ISL – Internet Sicherheitslösungen GmbH (Internet Security Solutions Ltd.)
- MMK – MultiMedia Kommunikationssysteme GmbH (MultiMedia Communication Systems Ltd.)
- Peperoni Mobile & Internet Software GmbH

== Partnerships and cooperations ==
In the fields of research and development the FU Hagen's faculties and chairs hold a wide array of diverse cooperations with renowned international scientific institutions, companies, associations (like the Kurt Haertel Institute for Intellectual Property) as well as public institutions. Furthermore, exchange of technology and knowledge is conducted through a variety of cooperation projects between science and industry, ranging from final theses by arrangement with the individual employer to commissioned research. Moreover, joint development of academic further education programs with companies, associations and scientific institutions contributes to the interlinking of academia and practice.

== Ranking and reputation ==
The special status of the FernUniversität Hagen as a university for distance learning mostly excludes the university from being ranked in general rankings. Only the renowned CHE ranking included the university in its university ranking of 2005 and evaluated the quality of the subjects Economics, Sociology and Business Administration. The departments of sociology and business administration received stellar placements – both research intensity and quality were emphasised to be in line with those of other top placed departments of on-campus universities.

== Student life ==
=== Student body ===
The University of Hagen had a student body of 83,536 students in the summer term of 2013. The average age of the matriculated students was 32 years. About 80% of the students at the FU Hagen are in full or part-time employment and 19% have already received a first academic degree.

== Notable alumni ==
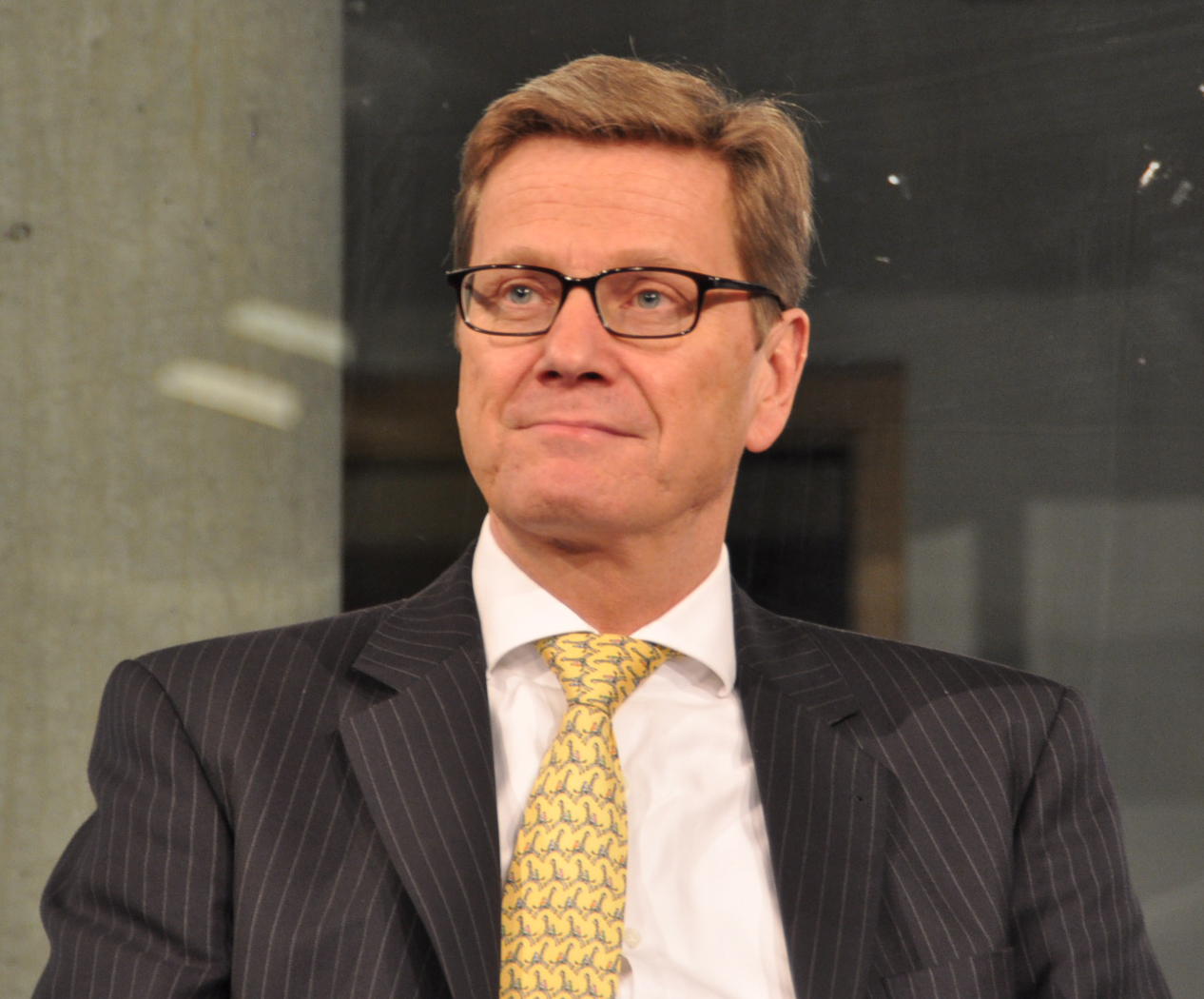
Guido Westerwelle, Vice Chancellor of Germany from 2009 to 2011

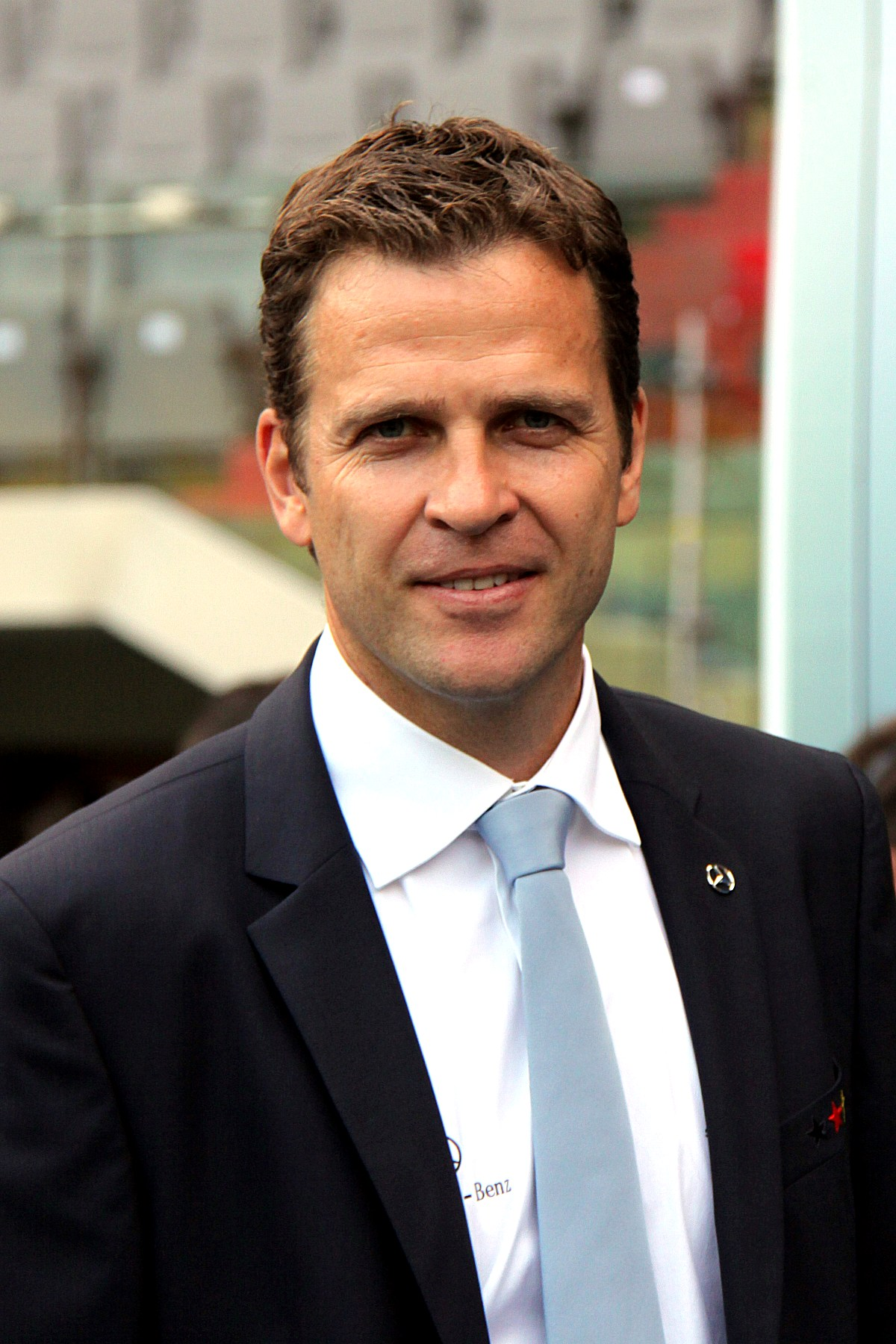
Oliver Bierhoff, retired professional football player

- Oliver Bierhoff, retired German football striker and former technical director of the Germany national football team
- Ijad Madisch, physician and co-founder of ResearchGate
- Mohammed bin Rashid Al Maktoum, Prime Minister of the United Arab Emirates and holder of an honorary doctorate from FU Hagen
- Heinz-Willi Mölders, board member of RWE (2005–present)
- Ursula Mueller, United Nations Assistant Secretary-General for Humanitarian Affairs and Deputy Emergency Relief Coordinator in the Office for the Coordination of Humanitarian Affairs
- Bernd Lucke, German economist and Founder of the German party AfD
- Roman Inderst, German economist
- Stefan Kirsten, CFO of Deutsche Annington (2011–present)
- Patrick Dahmen, board member of AXA, Germany (2007–2018)
- Michael Klug, CFO of Sony Music Entertainment, Germany (2011–present)
- Jens Spahn, Member of the German Bundestag
- Oliver Kahn, German football goalkeeper
- Richard Nagorny, CFO of AstraZeneca, Germany (2005–2010)
- Theo Lieven, Founder of Vobis Data Computer
- Anne Schäfer, tennis player
- Ulla Schmidt, German politician
- Stefan Schulz, Member of the supervisory board of SAP (2002–2017)
- Dirk Mausbeck, Board member of EnBW
- Guido Westerwelle, former German Minister of Foreign Affairs, Vice Chancellor of Germany from 2009 to 2011
- Jessica Zahedi, journalist
- Uğur Şahin, Founder of Biontech

== See also ==
- Education in Germany
- Hagen
- North Rhine-Westphalia
- List of universities in Germany
- List of business schools in Europe
- List of early modern universities in Europe
