= Ursula Mueller =

German diplomat

Ursula Mueller, (sometimes spelled Müller) served as the United Nations Assistant Secretary-General for Humanitarian Affairs and Deputy Emergency Relief Coordinator in the Office for the Coordination of Humanitarian Affairs from January 2017 to March 2020. Prior to this appointment of 5 January 2017 by United Nations Secretary-General António Guterres, Ms. Mueller served at the World Bank Group as German Executive Director to the Board of Executive Directors. She is the highest-ranking German within the UN as of 2018.

== Biography ==
Ursula Mueller graduated from Germany's Foreign Affairs Institute, receiving a Master of Arts in Public Policy and Public Administration. She also holds a master's degree in economics from the University of Hagen, Germany.

In 1980, Mueller began working for the German Federal Foreign Office, she then worked for the UN as part of the German Embassy in Washington, D.C., from 2001 to 2006. She was the Germany's Civil Coordinator in Kosovo and Germany's Special Envoy to Afghanistan. From 2006 to 2009, Mueller worked as Germany's Humanitarian Coordinator managing the countries humanitarian budget. From 2010 to 2012, she worked as Germany's Chargée d’Affaires in Reykjavík where she coordinated a task force in response to the 2008 financial crisis. From 2012 to 2014, she worked in Germany's Ministry of Economic Cooperation and Development. She has also served on the Advisory Board to the United Nations Relief and Works Agency for Palestine Refugees in the Near East (UNRWA) and on the United Nations Central Emergency Response Fund. From 2014 to 2017 she was the Executive Director of the World Bank Group.
