= Jessica Holmes =

Jessica Holmes may refer to:

- Jessica Holmes (comedian) (born 1973), Canadian comedian, actress and mental-health advocate
- Jessica Holmes (television presenter) (born 1976), co-host of Slime Time Live and anchor of KTLA Morning News
- Jessica Holmes (politician) (born 1983/1984), American attorney and politician, currently the North Carolina State Auditor
