= Jessica Millward =

American historian (born 1973)

- Born: June 17; American Fork, Utah
- Education: University of California, Los Angeles, Ph.D
- Occupations: Author, historian
- Employer(s): University of California, Irvine
- Website: jessicamillward.com

Jessica Millward is an American historian who focuses on African American history, early America, African diaspora, slavery, and gender. Her work focuses on the female slave experience by emphasizing narratives of black women during slavery.

== Early life ==
Jessica Millward was born in American Fork, Utah. She was raised in West Valley City, near Salt Lake City, in a Mormon household.

== Education ==
At the University of Utah, Millward majored in history and minored in African American studies to earn her bachelor's degree. After completing her bachelor's degree, a four-year scholarship was awarded to Millward to teach in secondary school in Utah. However, Millward decided to attend the University of California, Los Angeles, where she received her master's degree in African American studies and where she earned her doctorate. Millward was the first person on either side of her family to attend college and earn her Ph.D.

Maya Angelou's book, I Know Why the Caged Bird Sings, first sparked Millward's interest in studying African American history. Once in her master's program, Brenda Stevenson became an advisor to Millward. Stevenson's research intrigued Millward and encouraged her to study the slave experience. Newly learned knowledge from personal accounts and interacting with Stevenson's research became the foundation to Millward's book, Finding Charity's Folk.

== Career ==
Millward is an associate professor in the history department in the School of Humanities at the University of California, Irvine. Before teaching at the University of California, Irvine, she taught African American history at the University of Illinois at Urbana–Champaign.

While at the University of California, Irvine, Millward founded the UCI Ghana Project, a research exchange program between the University of California, Irvine and the University of Ghana.

Millward is involved with professional societies such as the American Historical Association, Association for the Study of the World Wide African Diaspora, Organization of American Historians, Association of Black Women Historians, Association for the Study of African American Life and History, Southern Association of Women Historians, Maryland Historical Society, and Delta Sigma Theta.

=== Awards and honors ===
Some of Millward's honors include:

- Association of American University Women Post Doctoral Fellowship, 2006–2007
- Lord Baltimore Fellowship, Maryland Historical Society, Baltimore, MD, 2004–2006
- Chancellor's Postdoctoral Fellow, African-American Studies and Research
- Program, University of Illinois, Urbana-Champaign, 2003–2004
- Nathan Huggins/Benjamin Quarles Dissertation Research Award, Organization of American Historians, 2003
- Research Fellow, David Library of the American Revolution, Washington
- Crossing, PA, 2001–2002
- Recipient of the Association of Black Women's Historians Letitia Woods Brown Award for best article on African American Women's History, 2007

== Works ==
Finding Charity’s Folk is a book written by Millward and published by the University of Georgia Press in December 2015. Finding Charity's Folk encompasses oral history, artifacts, photos, and personal accounts acquired over 15 years of research to share the narrative of enslaved women who had been silenced.
