= Jessica Murrey =

American game developer and peacemaker

Jessica Murrey is an international peacebuilder, a multi-generational gamer, and game developer. Murrey received a Northwest Regional Emmy for lead role in ''Don't Turn Away'', in 2012.

== Early life and education ==
Jessica Murrey attended Ashland High School in Oregon. From 2006 to 2010, she attended the University of Las Vegas, Nevada and earned a bachelor's degree journalism. While attending she played Volleyball for UNLV.

== Career ==
Murrey is the co-founder and CEO of Wicked Saints Studios founded in 2020. Murrey began her career on a local TV station spreading awareness campaigns. Before focusing on Wicked Saints, she quit her job in advocacy so that she could build connections with artists and designers while also gaining money on Kickstarter. She is also the co-founder of Battle for Humanity (B4H) which is a mobile game and part of a social movement. In 2012, she won the Northwest Regional Emmy for Community Service in an anti-child abuse media campaign called "Don't Turn Away." Murrey also won the 2012 Oregon Association of Broadcasters Award for "Best Public Service Announcement- Single Spot. She was the first developer signed to Niantic's Black Developers Initiative. Murrey has traveled with the world's largest conflict resolution organization, Search for Common Ground. While working with Search for Common Ground, Murrey ran the communications department. Murrey also participated in the training the peacekeepers which also helped flush out her career.

Murrey was selected as one of the 50 inaugural members of Game Awards' Future Class, honoring those "who represent the bright, bold and inclusive future of video games."

On behalf of Wicked Saints Studios, Murrey raised more than $1.1 million in pre-seed venture funding for a project called "World Reborn". In doing so, Murrey became one of less than 100 Black woman to have raised that amount of funding in the United States. "World Reborn" is marketed as the first adventure activism game, and will be done in collaboration with Niantic. The project allows for the new generation to view common ground activism, and is used to boost the mental health of those playing.
