= Jessica Weller =

German politician

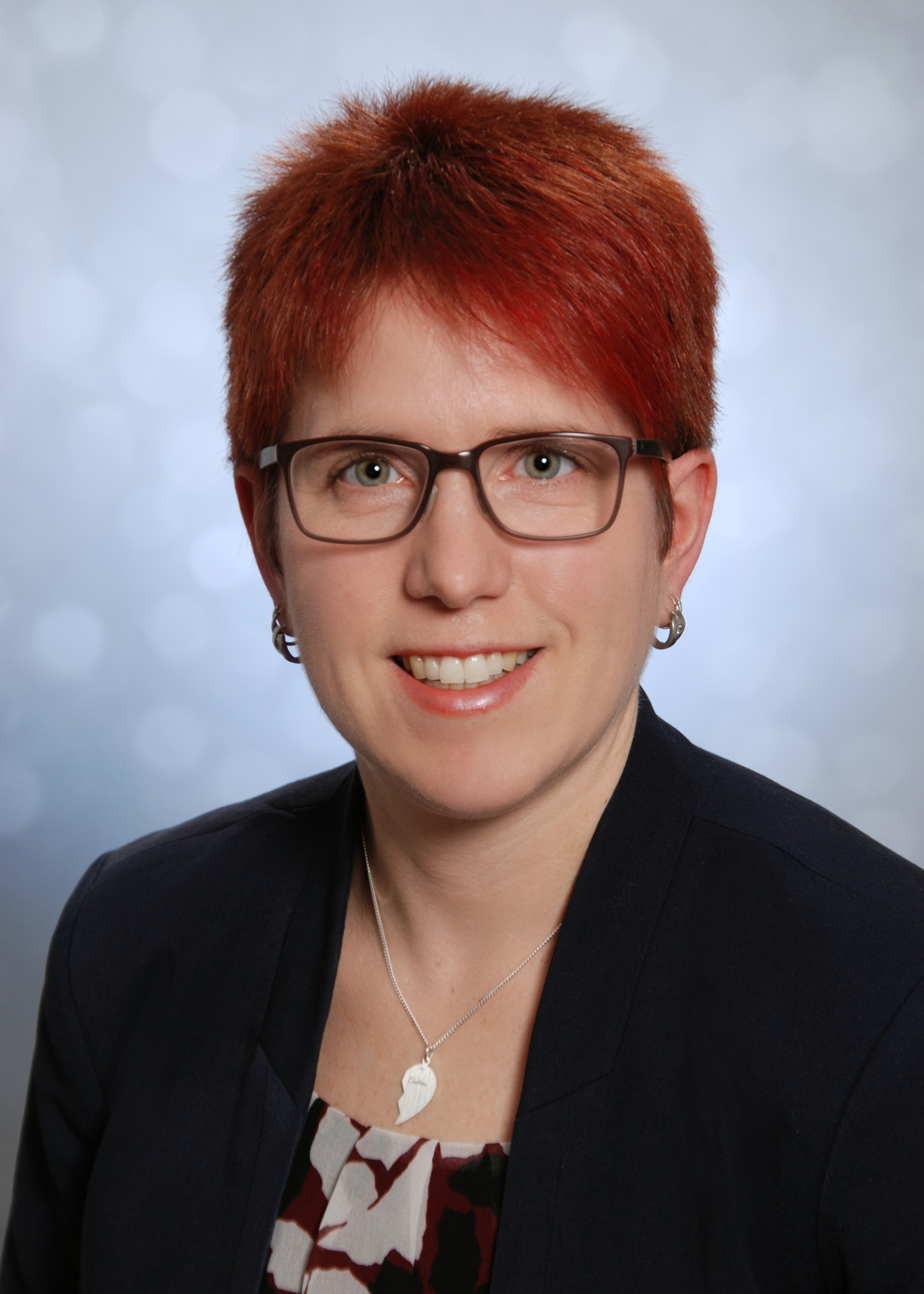
Jessica Weller (2019)

Jessica Weller (born 18 October 1983 in Wissen (Sieg)) is a German politician (CDU). She has been a member of the Landtag of Rhineland-Palatinate. She will no longer be a member of the Landtag elected in 2021 as of May 2021.

== Life and career ==
Weller passed her general university entrance qualification in 2003 at the Kopernikus-Gymnasium in Wissen. After completing a dual programme of studies to become a "Diplom-Verwaltungswirtin (FH)" (a German degree in public administration) at the Cologne university of applied sciences in public administration, she was a placement officer at the Federal Employment Agencie's local branch in Betzdorf from 2009 to 2011. From 2011 to 2019, she was employed as a clerk at the Federal Ministry of the Interior in Cologne. Jessica Weller is Catholic. She is married, has a son as well as a daughter and lives with her family in Gebhardshain.

== Politics ==
Weller joined the CDU in 2004 and has been a member of the district council of the Altenkirchen district since 2014, where she is deputy parliamentary group spokesperson for the CDU district council's faction and a member of the district committee. Since 2019, she has been deputy mayor of the local municipality of Gebhardshain and a member of the local council of Gebhardshain.

Weller has been a member of the Landtag of Rhineland-Palatinate since 1 September 2019. She succeeded Peter Enders, who was directly elected in the electoral district of Altenkirchen (Westerwald) and gave up his mandate on 31 August 2019, after being elected county commissioner of the Altenkirchen district in the local elections in May 2019.

In the state parliament, she worked in the Committee for Social Affairs & Labour, the Committee for Environment, Energy, Food & Forestry and the Committee for Equality and the Advancement of Women until her leaving after the state elections in 2021. She was the spokesperson on forestry policy for the CDU state parliamentary group.

Since August 2019, she has been state chairwoman of the CDA Rhineland-Palatinate and since 2017 federal member representative of the Women's Union of the CDU of Germany.
