= Jessica Rivera (music executive) =

American A&R music executive and performer

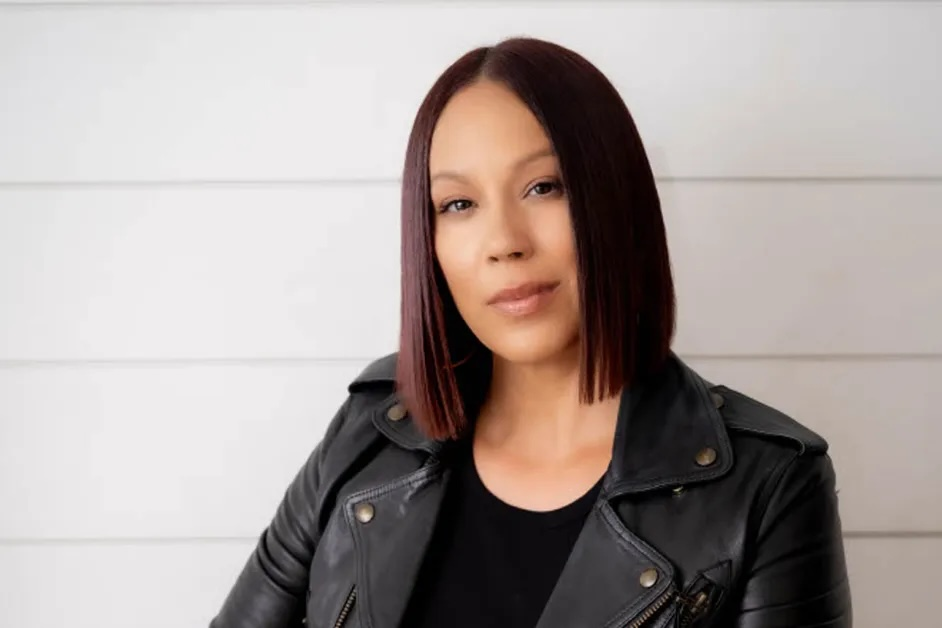
- Rivera in 2024
- Born: Parkchester, Bronx, New York, U.S.
- Occupations: A&R music executive; performer

Jessica Rivera is an American entrepreneur and music and entertainment executive. She signed Imagine Dragons and a pre-fame, 16-year-old Rihanna. As an A&R music executive, her influence can be heard on records by Eminem, Rihanna, Imagine Dragons, and Kanye West, among others.

== Career ==
=== Early career ===
Rivera began her career at several recording studios, including Soundtrack, Quad, Battery, and Hit Factory. This led to an opportunity to work directly for Kamaal "Q-Tip" Fareed of A Tribe Called Quest as his assistant. Rivera assisted Q-Tip with his day-to-day duties until leaving for an internship at the then-newly established Roc-A-Fella Records. She worked at other record labels, namely Bad Boy Entertainment and Def Jam. At Bad Boy, her first multi-platinum A&R project was the 2001 album Part III by R&B group 112. At Def Jam, Rivera worked with Kanye West. Kanye pays his tribute to Rivera in the song "Last Call", a 20-minute call-out song on his 2004 debut album The College Dropout, where the rapper name-checks some of the industry executives who recognized his talent early on. Rivera then joined EMI Music Publishing, where her first signing was Rihanna, then an unsigned artist.

=== Universal Music Publishing Group ===
Rivera worked at Universal Music Publishing Group (UMPG) for 11 years. In 2012, she was promoted to Senior Vice President / Co-Head of East Coast Operations. In 2015, she was promoted to Executive Vice President / Head of East Coast Operations and Creative.

Rivera signed an unknown producer named Alex da Kid , who went on to co-write Eminem's biggest song, "Love the Way You Lie", under the creative direction of Rivera, which was a copyright controlled completely by UMPG. Rivera spearheaded a joint venture that paved the way for the breakout success of a then-unknown Imagine Dragons. Her selected signings at UMPG included Alex da Kid, Imagine Dragons, Emile Haynie, Take a Daytrip, DJ Khalil, Bekon, Pop Wansel, and Phil Lawrence.

=== YouTube ===
At YouTube, Rivera was head of artist relations for YouTube's West Coast territory. She headed a livestream-based marketing campaign that helped take Mariah Carey’s "All I Want for Christmas Is You" to No. 1 on the Billboard Hot 100 for the first time. She also executed a deal for livestreaming rights to the 13th annual Roots Picnic in partnership with Michelle Obama's voter-registration nonprofit When We All Vote, an online festival that successfully registered voters, which was the most highly streamed event broadcast on The Roots' channel, and won a 2021 Webby Award for Best Festival or Concert (Virtual & Remote Features). In addition, Rivera contributed to the production of YouTube Originals shows like Stay Home with Yungblud with pre-famed artist Yungblud, and HBCU Homecoming 2020: Meet Me On The Yard, a global livestream event produced by Jesse Collins Entertainment and Live Nation Urban and aired in association with BET.

=== Other executive roles ===
In 2021, she was named General Manager at the media company Mass Appeal. She joined SoundCloud in 2022, serving as Global Senior VP and General Manager there.

In 2024, Rivera was named President of Issa Rae's audio content company, Raedio.

== Philanthropy ==
Rivera is a member of the board of directors at a non-profit animal advocacy organization, Humane World for Animals, and the Humane World Action Fund.

== Honors ==
- 2020: R&B/Hip-Hop Power Player, Billboard
