= Jessica Spring =

American printer and book artist

Jessica Spring is an American letterpress printer and book artist known for her work with Dead Feminists and Ladies of Letterpress.

Spring is the owner of Springtide Press in Tacoma, Washington.

== Education ==
Spring has an MFA from Columbia College Chicago.

== Career ==
Spring coined the term Daredevil Typesetting and has devised "furniture" to facilitate this process of setting type in curves and other forms.

Since 2008 Spring has contributed to The Dead Feminists project, a series of hand-made broadsides produced in limited editions. In 2016, the series was published in book form.

Spring has been teaching at Pacific Lutheran University since 2004.

In 2014 received an AMOCAT Arts Award from the Tacoma Arts Commission.

Her work is in the Massachusetts College of Art and Design, the National Museum of Women in the Arts (NMWA) the Nelson-Atkins Museum of Art, the Rhode Island School of Design Museum, Rollins College, University of California Berkeley, and the University of Louisville, among others.

== Publications ==
- Dead Feminists: Historic Heroines in Living Color, Sasquatch Books, Seattle, WA. ISBN 978-1632170576
- Ladies of Letterpress, Princeton Architectural Press; Illustrated edition, 2015. ISBN 978-1616892739
