= Jessica Schülke =

German politician (born 1984)

Member of the Landtag of Lower Saxony
- Incumbent
- Assumed office 8 November 2022

Personal details
- Born: 12 March 1984 (age 42) Sindelfingen
- Party: Alternative for Germany

Jessica Miriam Schülke (born 12 March 1984 in Sindelfingen) is a German politician serving as a member of the Landtag of Lower Saxony since 2022. She is the chairwoman of the Alternative for Germany in Wunstorf.
