= Jessica J. Connelly =

American psychologist

Jessica Connelly is a professor of psychology at the University of Virginia. Dr. Connelly's lab studies the interaction between DNA methylation of the oxytocin receptor and behavior. Her research has demonstrated that blood biomarker can be used to estimate gene methylation and transcription state in the brain in an animal model, as well as to predict postpartum depression. Dr. Connelly's lab primarily works with prairie voles due to their social monogamy.

== Education ==
Dr. Jessica Connelly earned her Bachelor's of Science (BS) in Chemistry, with a focus in Biochemistry, at Stockton College of New Jersey. In 1999, she went on to start her PhD in Genetics at State University of New York at Stony Brook, where she studied under a yeast epigeneticist, Dr. Rolf Sternglanz. In Sternglanz's lab, Connelly's thesis focused on chromatin compaction regulation transcription in histone code. After completing her PhD in 2004, she earned her postdoctoral degree at Duke University's Center for Human Genetics, during which time she focused on human genetics and genomics. Her mentors during her Postdoctoral degree at Duke University were statistical geneticist Dr. Elizabeth Hauser, and human genomicist Dr. Simon Gregory.
