= Edgar Tillyer =

Optical engineer (1881-1970)

Edgar Derry Tillyer
- Born: December 7, 1881; Dover, New Jersey, U.S.
- Died: December 25, 1970 (aged 89)
- Education: Dover High School; Rutgers University; George Washington University
- Known for: Lens design
- Scientific career
- Fields: Astronomy; Optics

Edgar Derry Tillyer (December 7, 1881 – December 25, 1970) was an American astronomer, computer and lens designer who was the director of research at the American Optical Company. The Optical Society established an award for distinction in the field of vision which is named in his honor, as he was the first award winner in 1954.

Born in Dover, New Jersey, Tillyer attended Dover High School, earned his undergraduate degree from Rutgers University and a Master's from George Washington University.

== See also ==
- Anna Estelle Glancy
