= Sophia Levy =

American astronomer and mathematics educator

Sophia Hazel Levy McDonald (December 12, 1888 – December 6, 1963) was an American astronomer, numerical analyst, and mathematics educator. She became the second tenured woman on mathematics faculty at the University of California, Berkeley, at a time when it was unusual for top mathematics programs to have even one female mathematician. Her main research topic concerned the orbits of comets and minor planets.

== Education and career ==
Levy majored in astronomy at the University of California, Berkeley, graduating in 1910, and continued at the university for graduate study in astronomy, supporting herself as Watson Assistant in Astronomy, University Fellow in Astronomy, assistant to the dean of the graduate division, and secretary to the California State Board of Education. She completed her Ph.D. in 1920, but continued in her secretarial work for a few more years, returning to the university to manage the office of the University of California Press and again taking a position as assistant to the dean.

After obtaining a position as a research assistant in astronomy, she was hired in 1921 or 1923 as an instructor in mathematics. She obtained a tenure-track position as assistant professor in 1924 or 1925, the second to do so after Pauline Sperry. Beginning in 1933, six mathematics faculty members including Levy, Annie Biddle, three male instructors, and a male assistant professor were all considered for termination, as part of an increased push for research excellence at the university that also included the hire of Griffith C. Evans as a new department chair in 1936. Biddle was let go, with the explanation that because she had married she did not need to remain employed, while the three male instructors were kept on, with the explanation for at least one being that because he was married and had a child he did need to remain employed. Levy and the other assistant professor were also kept on, in Levy's case at least in part because she was unmarried and was supporting another family member, her mother.

Continuing at Berkeley, Levy helped found the Northern California Section of the Mathematical Association of America in 1939, and served as its second chair and later as its sectional governor. She was also councilor general of Pi Mu Epsilon. She was tenured as an associate professor in 1940, and promoted to full professor in 1949. She retired in 1954, becoming a professor emerita.

She helped found the Northern California Section of the Mathematical Association of America in 1939, and served as its second chair and later as its sectional governor. She was also councilor general of Pi Mu Epsilon.

== Research and publications ==
Levy's main topic research was in theoretical astronomy, and involved calculations involving the orbits of comets and minor planets, the perturbations of those orbits by Jupiter, and the use of the observed perturbations to more accurately estimate the mass of Jupiter. Her dissertation, The theory of motion of the planet (175) Andromache, concerned the minor planet 175 Andromache, and was supervised by Armin Otto Leuschner. Some of her early work was represented in a paper with Leuschner and Anna Estelle Glancy in the Memoirs of the National Academy of Sciences, and she continued to collaborate with Leuschner for many years.

After becoming a mathematics instructor, she also came to work in numerical analysis, "including such subjects as interpolation methods, mechanical quadratures, the numerical solution of algebraic and transcendental equations, Fourier analysis and periodogram analysis". During World War II she directed a mathematics education program for the US Army at Berkeley, and published a textbook, Introductory Artillery Mathematics and Antiaircraft Mathematics (University of California Press, 1943).

== Personal life ==
Sophia Levy was born in Alameda, California, on December 12, 1888; her parents were also native Californians, born in former California Gold Rush communities.

In 1944 she married another Berkeley mathematician, John Hector McDonald. The marriage came after McDonald's retirement from Berkeley. By waiting for his retirement to marry him, Levy evaded the university's anti-nepotism rules which might well have terminated her job (but not his) if they married while he was still an active faculty member, as happened for instance at another university to Josephine M. Mitchell.

Her husband died in 1953, and she died on December 6, 1963, in Oakland, California.
