= Jessica Taylor (author) =

British forensic psychology graduate and author

Jessica Taylor FRSA
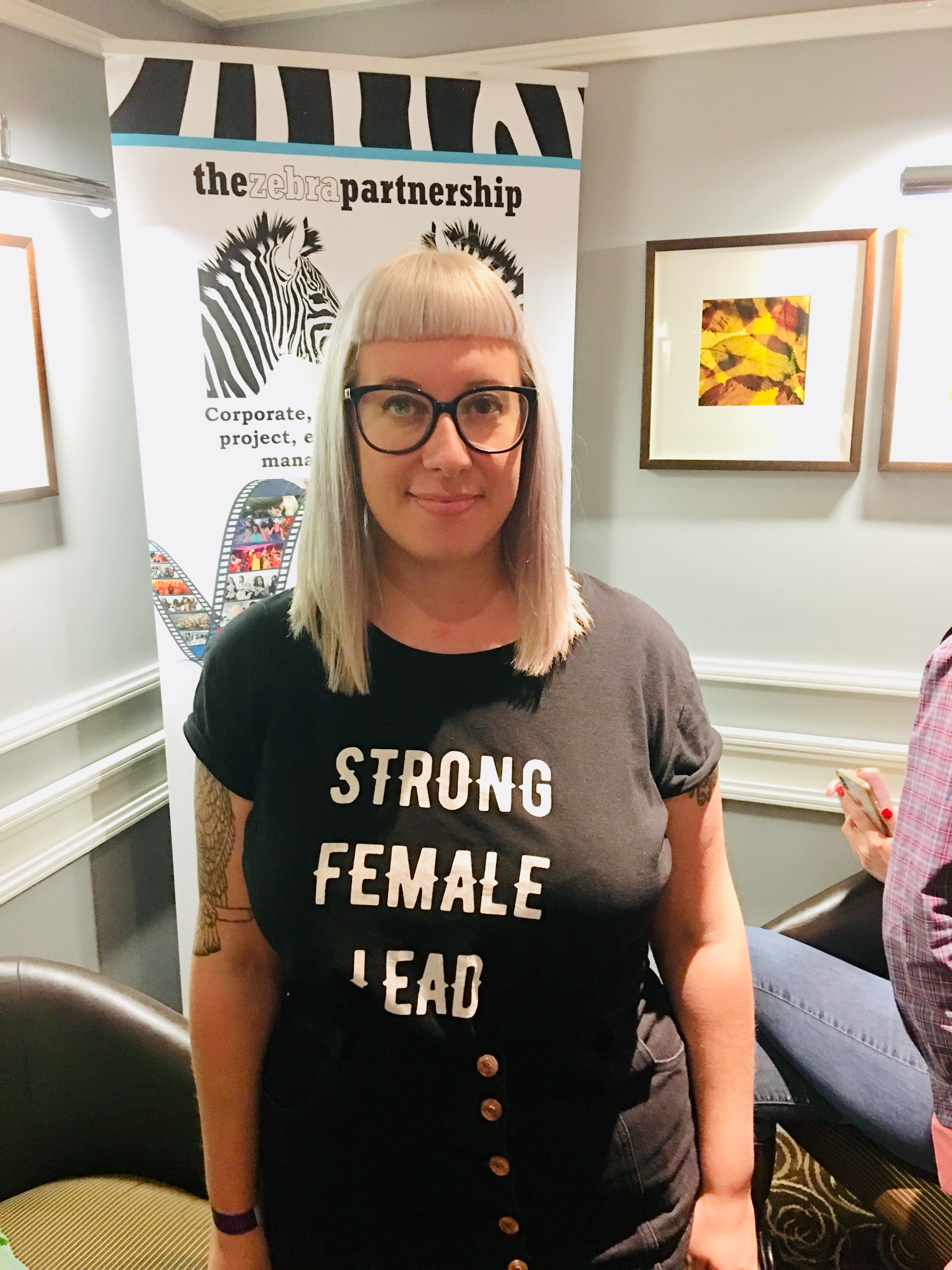
- Taylor in 2019
- Born: Stoke-on-Trent, Staffordshire, England
- Education: BSc Psychology Hons, 2015, Open University; PhD, psychology, 2019, University of Birmingham
- Known for: Campaigning for the rights of victims

Jessica Taylor is a British feminist author and campaigner. She wrote the 2020 book Why Women Are Blamed For Everything. She has made appearances on British television, including BBC Two documentary Womanhood, and in the true crime documentary My Lover, My Killer, which aired on Channel Five.

== Early life ==
Taylor grew up on a council estate in Stoke-on-Trent. She said that she was repeatedly sexually and physically abused as a teenager by men in her town, which she kept hidden from her family. As the result of her repeated rapes, Taylor gave birth to her first child at the age of 17 and reported her abuse to the police.

== Career ==
Taylor began volunteering with domestic violence victims before earning a Bachelor of Science Hons degree in psychology from the Open University. Upon receiving her degree, she co-founded The Eaton Foundation, a Male Mental Health and Wellbeing Centre in the UK, with Alex Eaton. She eventually quit her job and founded VictimFocus, which she describes as "a company designed to challenge and change the victim blaming practices in social care, policing, mental health and support services all over the world." In 2017 and 2018, she was shortlisted for the Emma Humphreys Memorial Prize.

In 2019, Taylor completed her PhD in psychology from the University of Birmingham with a thesis titled "'Logically, I know I'm not to blame but I still feel to blame': exploring and measuring victim blaming and self-blame of women who have been subjected to sexual violence." While working towards her doctoral degree, she was appointed to Chair of the Parliamentary Conference on Violence Against Women and Girls. Upon finishing her doctoral research, she became a senior lecturer in criminal and forensic psychology University of Derby. She was later recognized for her "contribution to the psychology of victim blaming of women, her work in mental health and her contribution to feminism" by being awarded a Fellowship of Royal Society of Arts.

In 2020, she self-published her thesis as a book titled Why Women are Blamed for Everything. Based on three years of doctoral research and ten years of practice with women and girls, the book focuses on the reasons why society and individual psychology blames women for male violence committed against them. It draws on the psychometric measure Taylor developed during her doctoral research–called the BOWSVA scale–which measures the way the general public and professionals apportion blame to women and girls who have been subjected to sexual violence. The book also includes interviews with women who have been blamed for sexual assaults and professionals working in sexual violence services who are attempting to deconstruct victim blaming.

Upon the book's release, she was the target of coordinated attacks and harassment by alt-right trolls on Facebook and Twitter, and her personal computer was hacked. Why Women are Blamed for Everything sold 10,000 copies in its first two months before being bought by the publishing company Constable.

In 2022, she published her second book, Sexy But Psycho: Uncovering the Labelling of Women and Girls through Constable. She described it as "mixture of academic research, history, psychology and real-life stories of women and girls who have been told that they are mentally ill, instead of being listened to". The book focuses on how mental illness has historically been used to discredit women, focusing especially on the 2000s and pop artist Britney Spears.

During the Depp v. Heard case, she said that borderline personality disorder and histrionic personality disorder are "not proven medical conditions" but are instead "highly contested controversial psychiatric labels". On her website, she professed that the former is known in psychology and psychiatry as a "junk diagnosis", and the latter as a "debunked disorder".

== Publications ==
- The Little Orange Book: Learning about abuse from the voice of the child (2018)
- Detoxing Taylor (2011, as Jessica Eaton)
- Why Women are Blamed for Everything: Exploring Victim Blaming of Women Subjected to Abuse and Trauma (2020)
- 'I thought it was just a part of life': Understanding the Scale of Violence Committed Against Women in the UK Since Birth (April 2021, with J Shrive)
- Sexy But Psycho: Uncovering the Labelling of Women and Girls (2022)
- Trauma: An Exploration of Pain and Healing (February 2023), Independently published, 92 pages (ASIN: B0BW36MFGS)
- The Reflective Journal for Parents and Carers: Supporting Your Child After Sexual Abuse (August 2023), Lulu.com, 171 pages (ASIN: B0CGKHC2C6)
- Woman in Progress: The Reflective Journal for Women and Girls Subjected to Abuse and Trauma (August 2023), Independently published, 285 pages (ASIN: B0CM1HW6V3)
- Underclass: A Memoir (2024), Constable, 358 pages (ISBN 978-1408716953)
- Click. Stalk. Destroy.: Inside the Minds of People Who Stalk Online (2026), Constable, 352 pages (ISBN 978-0349022611)

=== Collaborations ===
- Indicative Trauma Impact Manual ITIM: ITIM for Professionals (March 2023), with Jaimi Shrive, Independently published, 416 pages (ASIN: B0BZF4Z312)
- Cognitive Behavioral Therapy: Embracing a Happier and More Fulfilling Life (July 2023), with Jaimi Shrive, Independently published, 228 pages (ASIN: B0CCCX5982)
- The Primary School and Home School Guide: Ethical sex and relationships education for young children (July 2023), with Jaimi Shrive, Independently published, 58 pages (ASIN: B0CCZZYTZ2)
- Healthy Relationships and Ethical Sex Education: Guide for Secondary School KS3-KS4 (July 2023), with Ivanina Atonasova, Bramley Clarence, Chloe DiMaccio, Verity James-Sinetos, Ioanna Lefa, Jaimi Shrive, Georgia Welshman and Laura Williams, Independently published, 103 pages (ASIN: B0CCZXNL36; ISBN 979-8853496323)
