= Jessica Falk =

Swedish singer-songwriter and musician

- Birth name: Jessica Falk
- Born: 14 July 1973 (age 51); Sundsvall, Sweden
- Occupation: Singer-songwriter/musician
- Website: jessicafalk.com

Jessica Falk (born 14 July 1973 in Sundsvall, Sweden) is a Swedish singer-songwriter and musician. She started playing the piano at the age of 7. Her debut album, "The Nashville Sessions" was released in September 2011 with contributing artists such as Charlie McCoy, Chip Young, Bob Mater and Vip Vipperman. Her music video "Rainbow" climbed to eighth place on the music site Naver, one of Korea's largest digital music sites.
