= Jessica McCabe =

American actress, writer, and YouTube personality

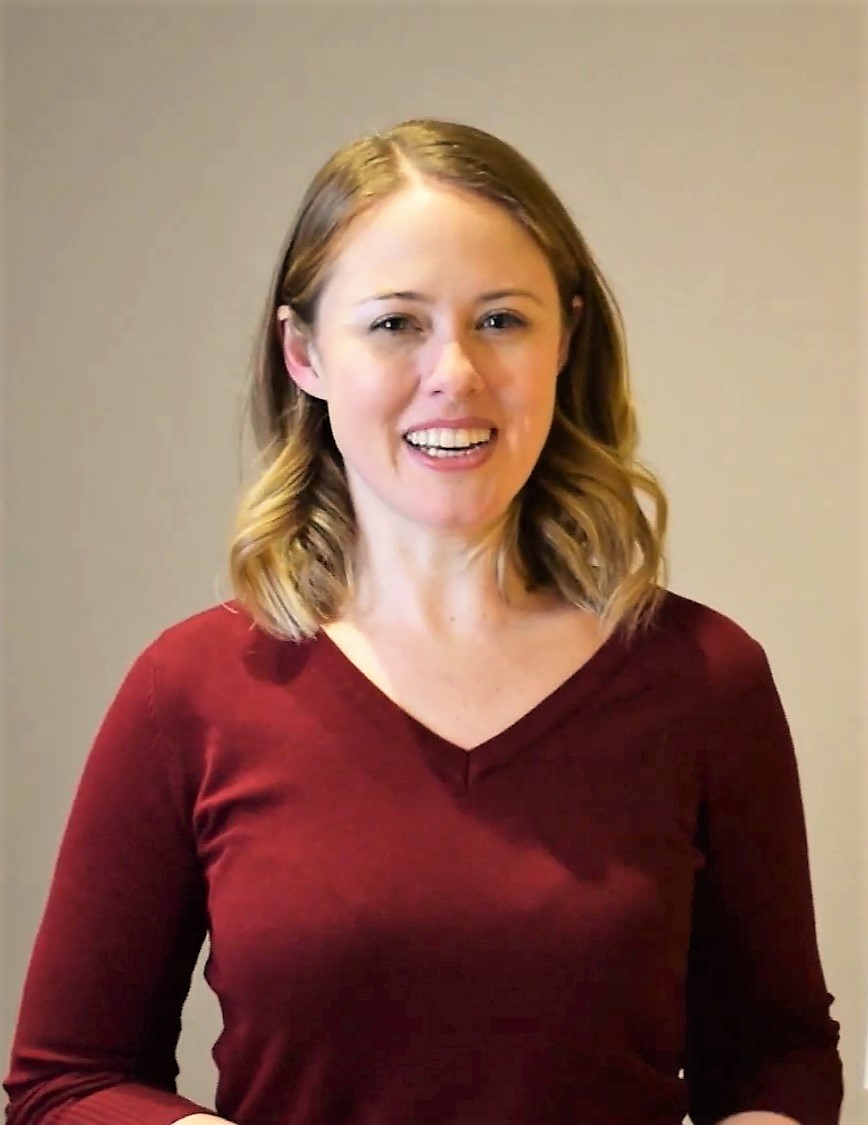
- McCabe speaks for CADDAC, the Centre for ADHD Awareness, Canada, in 2020
- Born: Jessica Lauren McCabe; 5 November 1982 (age 43); Los Angeles, California, US
- Occupations: Actress; writer; YouTube personality
- Years active: 2003–present

Jessica Lauren McCabe (born 5 November 1982) is an American actress, writer, and YouTube personality. She is best known as the host for the YouTube channel How to ADHD as well as for roles in several independent films and television shows including the show American Dreams and the short film Lure.

== Early life ==
McCabe was born in 1982 or 1983 in Los Angeles, California. She was diagnosed with ADHD at age 12. Shortly after, she began taking medication, including Ritalin, and seeing a psychiatrist. McCabe struggled to complete community college and dropped out at age 21.

== Career ==
=== Film, media and television ===
McCabe's on-screen career began as a guest star on the 2003 series of Dragnet. She followed this up with roles in several independent films including Scorched before landing the role of Becky O'Connor in American Dreams. She followed this up with a recurring role on the NBC drama Windfall.

She next appeared as "Courtney" in the independent short film Lure, which played at the Tribeca Film Festival as well as the London Film Festival and garnered her a win for best actress at the New York Indie Film Fest.

Additional roles include the TNT television series Dark Blue as well as another role in Monk. She made her screenwriting debut in the live action 3D short film, Happy Ending, in which she also stars.

In 2022, she collaborated with neuropsychologist and ADHD expert Russell Barkley to produce an ADHD certification course.

=== YouTube ===
In January 2016, she started her YouTube channel How to ADHD. The channel is dedicated to all topics regarding attention deficit hyperactivity disorder including tips on how to take advantage of the neurodivergent brain type as well as reviews on products such as fidget toys and journals. As of February 2022, the channel has over one million subscribers with its accompanying Patreon gaining over $15,700 a month. Her TEDx talk, which she gave in 2017 has over 6 million views as of July 2024.

McCabe provides content regarding the various ways ADHD can be treated, and how those with the condition can live fulfilling lives. Videos featured on the channel cover a wide variety of topics pertaining to living with ADHD.

On 2 January 2024, McCabe released a self-help book based on her YouTube channel which was published by Random House.

== Filmography ==
Year	Film/TV Series	Role	Notes
2009
2009	Happy Ending	Lauren McGee	Pre-Production
2009	Monk	Cashier	
2009	Dark Blue	Kara Tivnan	
2009	Legend of the Mountain Witch	Jessica	Post-Production
2009	The Queen of Screams	Willow	Post-Production
2009	Sibling Rivalry	Becky Johnson	Completed
2006	Lure	Courtney	
2006	Windfall		
2005	American Dreams	Becky O'Connor	
2004	Joe Killionaire	Cake Girl	
2003	Scorched	Nicole	
2003	Dragnet		
2003	Love Songs	Club Patron 2	
