= Jessica Zahedi =

German television presenter and journalist

Jessica Zahedi (born 1 August 1978 in Heidelberg) is a German television presenter and journalist.

Zahedi completed her Abitur at the Gutenberg-Gymnasium in Mainz and studied political science at the University of Hagen. Later she worked at Radio RPR, where she was a trainee. After collaborating on an online TV project of 1. FC Kaiserslautern and as a reporter, she participated in the launch of the youth wave bigFM in Rheinland-Pfalz. Finally, she went to Hamburg to work at Scholz & Friends in advertising. Then she returned to Mainz. Since 2006 she has worked at ZDF in the Today program. Zahedi has a child born in 2012.

== Programs ==
Currently

- heute Xpress (since 2015)

Formerly

- heute plus (2011–2015)
- heute (Early and late editions, short segments during the ZDF morning magazine; 2011-2015)
