= Jessica Largey =

American chef

- Born: Fillmore, California
- Education: California School of Culinary Arts
- Culinary career
- Cooking style: American cuisine
- Current restaurant: None
- Previous restaurants: Simone; Manresa
- Awards won: 2015 Rising Star Chef of the Year at the James Beard Foundation Awards; 2013 StarChefs.com Rising Star Chef Award; 2013 Eater Young Gun Award

Jessica Largey is an American chef, who was named the Rising Star Chef of the Year at the James Beard Foundation Awards in 2015. She was the opening head chef at restaurant, Simone, in Los Angeles.

== Career ==
Jessica Largey was raised in Fillmore, California, and trained at the California School of Culinary Arts in Pasadena. During her early career, Largey worked in several fine dining restaurants, such as Providence, Bastide and The Fat Duck. In 2013, Zagat named her as one of their "30 under 30" list for San Francisco, and was won rising star chefs from StarChefs.com and Eater. Largey was nominated for the James Beard Foundation Award for Rising Star Chef of the Year in 2014, while working as chef de cuisine at the three Michelin star restaurant Manresa in Los Gatos, California under head chef David Kinch. She was re-nominated again the following year, when she won the award.

Following the James Beard Foundation Award, she collaborated on a joint menu later that year at the rotating chef restaurant Intro in Chicago. She returned to the restaurant as the fifth chef-in-residence in February 2016, following her departure from Manresa. It was announced in mid 2016, that Largey was opening her first restaurant as head chef later that year. Named Simone, it was located in the Arts District, Los Angeles. Simone opened 9/20/18 but closed just 6 months later to be reopened under a new name and new head chef. Largey opened the restaurant with the backing of film director Joe Russo and Bruno Bagbeni, who financed Bastide. Largey named the restaurant after singer Nina Simone, after being inspired by her music one evening.
