= Jessica Reed Kraus =

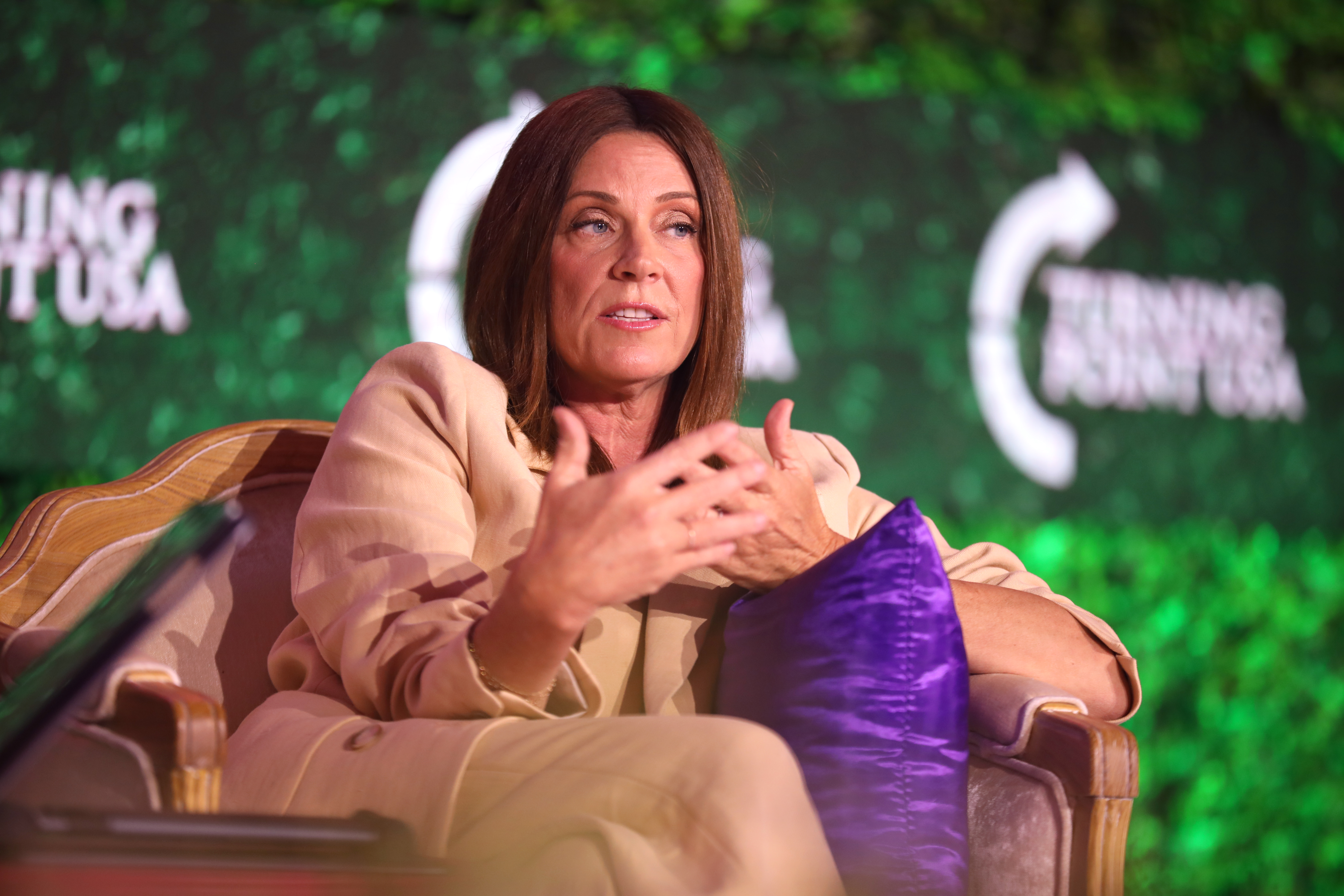
- Kraus speaking at a Turning Point USA event in June 2024
- Occupation: Writer
- Spouse: Mike Kraus
- Children: 4

Instagram information
- Page: houseinhabit
- Followers: 1.2 million (November 2, 2026)

Jessica Reed Kraus is an American writer, right-wing influencer, and former mommy blogger who writes the newsletter House Inhabit. The newsletter covers celebrity gossip, conspiracy theories, and American politics. Kraus describes her writing as an "alternative approach to reporting" with which "the basic quest for truth, paired with a flexible narrative, I think speaks to people in a real way." She has been described as pro-Trump, a member of the MAHA movement, and the "queen bee of MAGA socialites".

== Early life ==
Kraus grew up in Corona, California as the third of four children. Her father struggled with a drug addiction and died by suicide when she was six. As a teenager, Kraus aspired to be a gossip columnist or a talk show host.

She received a bachelor's degree in English from California State University, Fullerton and intended to become a teacher; however, those plans were disrupted when she became pregnant with her then-boyfriend Mike, who was a touring musician.

== Social media career and content ==
Kraus created a lifestyle blog in 2011 and later ran a literary-minded blog called The Ma Books from 2014 to 2019. Her following grew as an home improvement and lifestyle influencer on Instagram under the username @houseinhabit. Frequent posts included content about her family and of her husband Mike's renovations of their home in San Clemente, California; the renovation was featured on Martha Stewart's Instagram page. During this time, the family supplemented her husband's construction income by selling items on Etsy such as teepees for kids.

Kraus's content and writing underwent a change through the beginning of the COVID-19 pandemic, with Mother Jones describing it becoming "increasingly conspiratorial". Kraus wrote that her income during this time "depended on the sellable nature of [her] ‘brand’", which prior to COVID was "liberal-leaning & sans controversy".

In 2021, she claimed that a fatal crowd crush at the 2021 Astroworld festival was the result of a demonic ritual. Also in 2021, Kraus began posting about the Britney Spears conservatorship case to a receptive audience. She later attended the trials of Ghislaine Maxwell in 2021 and Harvey Weinstein in 2022, posting through both trials on Instagram stories and in her newsletter. She claimed that visitations from an owl convinced her to cover the Maxwell trial in full from New York. Kraus typically crowdfunded to fund travel related to this content, receiving $50,000 for the Maxwell trial and $20,000 for the Spears case.

In 2022, actor Johnny Depp sued his ex-wife Amber Heard for defamation following public claims of domestic abuse. Kraus claimed that she had an extensive phone conversation with Depp before the trial commenced and claimed he was "unfairly presumed to have abused Heard". Kraus's following grew by hundreds of thousands as she posted daily updates of the trial, the content of which primarily criticized Heard. Journalist Choire Sicha wrote in New York that Kraus was a "chief instigator of the anti-Heard storyline." Her criticisms and allegations about Heard included that she was "making a mockery of the #MeToo movement", hosted "Satanic parties", and that her child was secretly fathered by Elon Musk. After the trial, Kraus wrote that she met Depp in person at a cocktail party, who thanked her for her writing.

When Catherine, Princess of Wales underwent surgical cancer treatment in 2024, Kraus published misinformation about her condition in her newsletter. She has also platformed the work of conspiracy and New Age influencers such as Jennifer Carmody and Liz Crokin, who wrote of Pizzagate and claimed that Elvis Presley was a victim of CIA mind control.

As of 2026, the House Inhabit Substack had 434,000 subscribers, a decline from 452,000 in the previous year. The Wall Street Journal estimated that the newsletter generates over $1 million in annual revenue.

== Political views and activities ==
Kraus previously considered herself "super liberal", flying to Washington D.C. for the 2017 Women's March after Donald Trump's first inauguration. She described herself as becoming disillusioned with the Democratic Party as a result of COVID-19 policies like lockdowns, vaccination, and masking. She also felt the media coverage of Donald Trump during this time was unfair. Kraus moved to Substack during the COVID-19 pandemic, citing their "lack of censorship". She was later critical of the platform for removing five neo-Nazi newsletters, which did so after pushback from users.

Kraus has posted in approval of both Robert F. Kennedy Jr. and Donald Trump, describing her own coverage of the two as less biased compared to mainstream media. As her interest in Kennedy piqued, she regularly posted in support of him on her Instagram account and encouraged her followers to attend his campaign events. She praised the MAGA movement for being "always a good time" saying "they drink well, dress up, get loud, bedazzle the hell outta their accessories, love this country unapologetically, and believe that Donald Trump’s reign is a God-granted gift to save us from woke infestation and communism." She has described Trump as a "father figure" and "brilliant".

She received access to a Donald Trump 2024 presidential campaign event, as the campaign wanted more influence among Kraus's primarily female readership. The campaign later invited Kraus to a Super Bowl party at Mar-a-Lago. According to Kraus, a Trump staffer "commended her for her work in helping Trump win over women compared to the mainstream media." Journalists noted that Kraus has been a frequent visitor to the Trump resort and to parties with White House associates since 2024.

According to HuffPost, Kraus has repeatedly mocked the victims of Jeffrey Epstein and downplayed or disputed their claims of being sexually assaulted. She has accused survivors of lying for money, and has advocated for the release of Ghislane Maxwell, Epstein's accomplice. Kraus believes Maxwell was "unfairly" blamed for crimes committed by Epstein's clients. In February 2025, Kraus was one of several pro-Trump influencers who received binders labeled "The Epstein Files: Phase 1" from the Trump administration at the White House. The material in the binders was reported to consist of information which had already been publicly available.

In addition to advocating for Maxwell, Kraus has also advocated for the release of Theranos founder Elizabeth Holmes from prison, wearing a "Free Elizabeth Holmes" t-shirt and writing of her "redemption arc" in September 2026 posts.

== Personal life ==
Kraus in San Clemente, California. Her husband Mike has been a stay-at-home dad for their four children following the success of House Inhabit. She is estranged from her mother due to disagreement over the COVID-19 vaccine.
