= Anna Estelle Glancy =

American astronomer

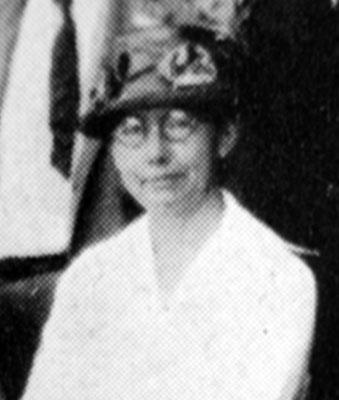
- Born: 29 October 1883
- Died: 19 May 1975 (aged 91)
- Education: Wellesley College; University of California, Berkeley
- Known for: Lens design
- Scientific career
- Fields: Astronomy; Optics

Anna Estelle Glancy (20 October 1883 – 19 May 1975) was an astronomer, computer and lens designer whose work with Edgar Tillyer at the American Optical Company improved the optics of eyeglasses, cameras, telescopes, and military optical instruments. She was born and died in Waltham, Massachusetts.

== Publications ==
- Glancy, A. (1909). Observations of comets and asteroids. Berkeley: University Press.
- Glancy, A. (1909). Photographic observations of Comet c 1908 (Morehouse). Berkeley: University Press.
- Cole, F., Cummings, L., Glancy, A., Leuschner, A., Levy, S., Merrill, G., Van Orstrand, C. and White, H. (1921). Memoirs of the National Academy of Sciences. Volume XIV. Washington, DC: [s.n.].
- Glancy, A., Leuschner, A. and Levy, S. (1922). On von Zeipel's theory of the perturbations of the Hecuba group of minor planets. [Washington].
- Leuschner, A., Glancy, A. and McDonald, S. (1922). Tables of minor planets discovered by James C. Watson. Washington: Govt. Print. Off.
- Perrine, C. and Glancy, A. (1934). Observaciones del cometa Halley durante su aparicion en 1910. Córdoba: Publicado por el Observatório.
- Glancy, A. (1936). The focal power of ophthalmic lenses. [Southbridge, Mass]: American Optical Co.

== Patents ==
- Lens-grinding machine US1503497 A, 5 Aug 1924, Anna Estelle Glancy, American Optical Corp
- Ophthalmic lens US1518405 A, 9 Dec 1924, Anna Estelle Glancy, American Optical Corp
- Lens US1520617 A, 23 Dec 1924, Anna Estelle Glancy / Edgar D Tillyer, American Optical Corp
- Ophthalmic lens US1659197 A, 14 Feb 1928, Anna Estelle Glancy, American Optical Corp
- Lens-seating device US1722520 A, 30 Jul 1929, Anna Estelle Glancy, American Optical Corp
- Lens-testing instrument US1726820 A, 3 Sep 1929, Anna Estelle Glancy, American Optical Corp
- Optical system for measuring changes in magnification US2179850 A, 14 Nov 1939, Anna Estelle Glancy, American Optical Corp
- Ophthalmic lens US2180003 A, 14 Nov 1939, Anna Estelle Glancy / Louis L Gagnon, American Optical Corp
- Size testing system US2191107 A, 20 Feb 1940, Anna Estelle Glancy, American Optical Corp
- Wide aperture objective US2371165 A, 13 Mar 1945, Anna Estelle Glancy, American Optical Company
- Wide aperture lens system having means for reducing spherical aberrations US2474837 A, 5 Jul 1949, Anna Estelle Glancy, American Optical Corp
