= Jessica Garza Montes de Oca =

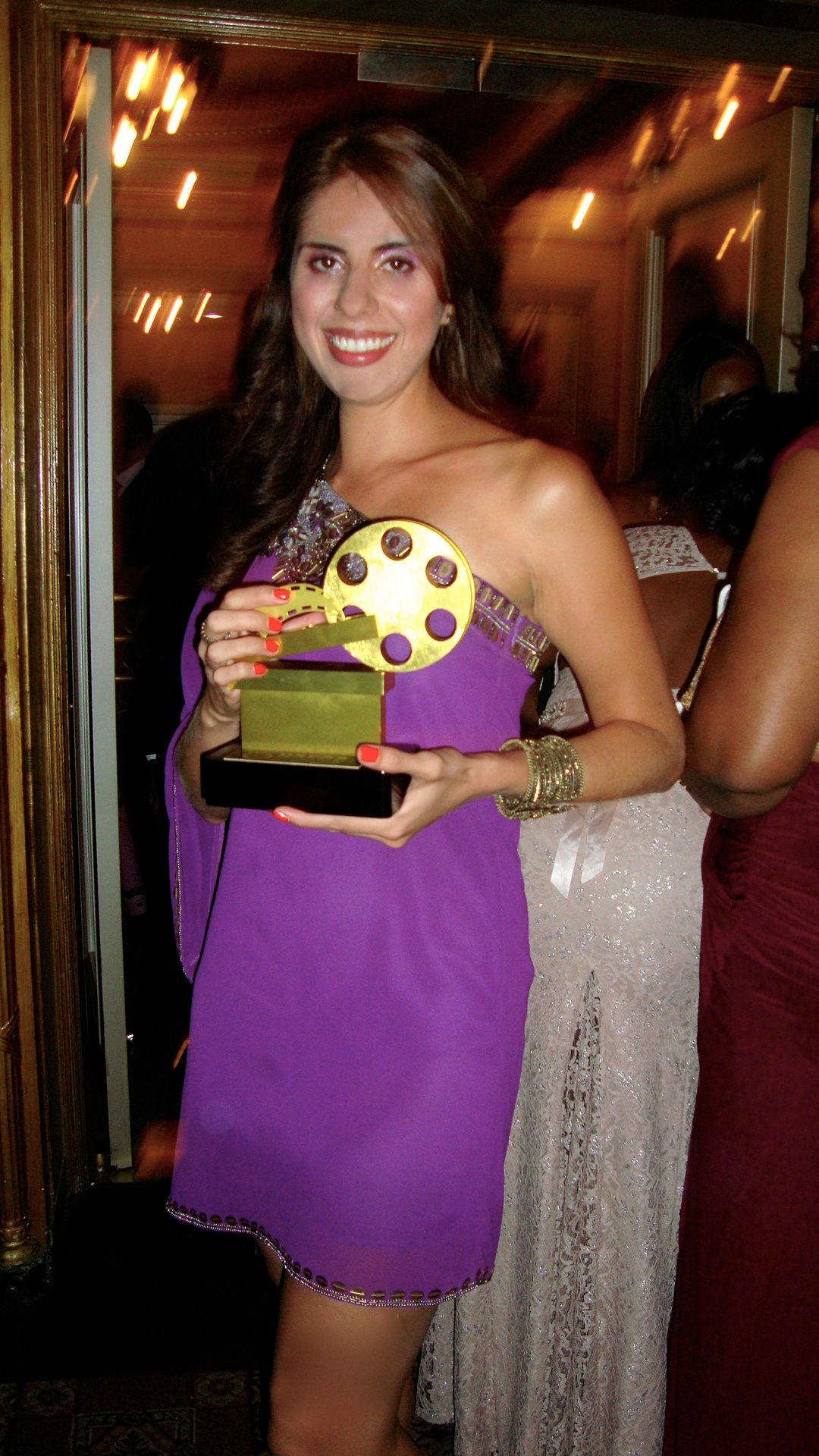
- Garza in 2013

Background information
- Born: 22 September 1984 (age 41); Mexico City, Mexico
- Genres: Pop; Latin pop
- Occupations: Singer-songwriter, actress, writer
- Instruments: Vocals
- Years active: 2008–present
- Website: jessikagarza.com

Jessica Garza Montes de Oca (born 22 September 1984) is a Mexican actress, singer-songwriter and writer.

== Early life ==
Garza Montes de Oca was born and raised in Mexico City. She has a BA in theatre from the Universidad de las Americas, Puebla.

== Career ==
=== Acting ===
Garza Montes de Oca started in telenovelas for the network TV Azteca where she played supporting roles for productions including: Secretos del alma, Pobre rico, pobre, Lo que callamos las mujeres, Pobre diabla, Vuelveme a querer, Pasion Morena, Mujer comprada, and Cada Quien su Santo. Garza Montes de Oca starred in the musical I love you, you're Perfect now change and was Stage Manager for The Beauty and the Beast Mexico. Garza Montes de Oca moved to L.A to pursue her master's degree in film acting at The New York Film Academy. She starred in several short films including Nighttime nominated in the Los Angeles Movie Awards and Oblivion, nominated in the Los Angeles Cinema Festival of Hollywood. She co-stars in the film Of Sentimental Value with Tommy "Tinny" Lister and Malik Yoba.

=== Music ===
Garza Montes de Oca released her first single, "Broken Memories", in 2013.

== Awards and nominations ==
Garza Montes de Oca won the African Oscar 2013 for Best Soundtrack for the song America for the feature film The Fetus. She was also nominated in the African Oscars as "Favorite Actress" for her role in Of Sentimental Value.
