= Jessica Wright =

Jessica Wright may refer to:

- Jessica L. Wright (born 1952), American politician
- Jess Wright (born 1986), English television personality and star of The Only Way Is Essex
- J. Madison Wright Morris (1984–2006), American actress
- Jessica Wright (sprinter) (born 2000), American athlete
