= ACQUIN =

Higher education organisation based in Europe

Accrediterungs-, Certifizierungs- und Qualitätssicherungs-Institut
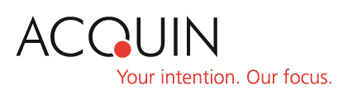
- Abbreviation: ACQUIN
- Formation: 2000
- Type: NGO
- Purpose: Educational accreditation
- Location: Bayreuth, Bavaria, Germany
- Members: ENQA; EUA; ANQAHE; CEEN; INQAAHE
- Website: www.acquin.com

The Akkrediterungs-, Certifizierungs- und Qualitätssicherungs-Institut (Accreditation, Certification and Quality Assurance Institute) (ACQUIN) is a school accreditation system founded in the year 2001 as a consequence of the European Bologna process and the upcoming need for assuring the quality of newly introduced undergraduate and postgraduate degrees in Germany. ACQUIN is a member-based, non-profit organisation located in Bayreuth, Bavaria, Germany. The Institute operates under the licence of the German Accreditation Council and is thus empowered to award its quality seal to study programs which have successfully undergone accreditation. ACQUIN was reaccredited by the German Accreditation Council until 30 September 2011. ACQUIN operates internationally in several key regions, including the German-speaking European region, Middle and Eastern Europe and North Africa - Near and Middle East. Nowadays ACQUIN is an association of over 100 higher education institutions from Germany, Austria, Switzerland, Hungary and the United States of America. ACQUIN operates as a non-profit organisation which is financed through membership fees as well as through Higher Education Institutions for accreditation services provided.

ACQUIN is a member of and is recognized by various international agencies such as: the European Quality Assurance Register for Higher Education (EQAR), the European Association for Quality Assurance in Higher Education (ENQA), the European University Association (EUA), the Central Eastern European Network for Quality Assurance (CEENQA), and the International Network for Quality Assurance Agencies in Higher Education (INQAAHE).

== History ==
In May 2000, the Bavaria Rectors’ Conference passed a resolution to establish an accreditation agency that performs accreditation for all types of higher education institutions taking into account all types of programs and disciplines. As a result, the Accreditation, Certification and Quality assurance Institute (ACQUIN) was founded on January 26, 2001 and accredited by the German Accreditation Council on March 22, 2001. The German Accreditation Council reaccredited ACQUIN in 2006 until 30 September 2011.

== Objective of the accreditation ==
ACQUIN’s aim is to support the maintenance and enhancement of quality standards for teaching and learning in higher education and to contribute to the internationalization of German higher education by performing accreditation for all different types of higher education institutions and taking into account all different types of programs and subjects. A main objective is to provide guidance and information for students, employers and higher education institutions and to contribute to more transparency in the market of study programs. Within the accreditation process, the institutional membership of the applicant does not have any decisive influence, neither on the content of the evaluation procedure nor on the accreditation decision-making process.

The main characteristics of ACQUIN are independence, objectivity and high quality. Academic freedom and academic autonomy are respected: Higher education institutions may regulate their own quality and standards, but at the same time they must guarantee transparency of process and public accountability in discharging this self-regulation.

Degree programs are evaluated by reason of their characteristic purpose as well as on the basis of the quality criteria developed and applied by the agency, regardless of their institutional membership. The make-up of the decision-making bodies does not allow biased persons to intervene in the current procedure. Not only professors and higher education experts, but also students and independent representatives of professional practice participate actively in the accreditation procedures, while members of the state can observe the activities of the agency.

== Accredited Institutions ==
Currently, ACQUIN has accredited more than 100 higher education institutions from countries including Germany, Switzerland, Austria, Hungary, Lebanon and the United States; these institutions include:

- Charisma University
- Freie Universität Berlin
- Goethe University Frankfurt
- Hochschule Furtwangen
- Hochschule Heilbronn
- Philipps-Universität Marburg (accredited Double Master Degree in International Business Management in partnership with the French Grande Ecole Business School INSEEC School of Business & Economics in Paris).
- University of Heidelberg
- University of Freiburg
- University of Mainz
- University of Bremen
- University of Balamand
- Université Saint Joseph de Beyrouth
- German University in Cairo

== See also ==
- Association of MBAs (AMBA)
- Association to Advance Collegiate Schools of Business (AACSB)
- European Quality Improvement System (EQUIS)
- Triple accreditation
