= Jessie (given name) =

Jessie is a given name in its own right, but may also be a nickname for the given name Jessica. It is generally considered the feminine form of Jesse. The name Jess is also a given name. It, or Jesse, may be used in Spanish as a nickname for the given name Jesus.

== People ==
- Jessie Armstead (born 1970), American football player
- Jessie Bartlett Davis (1860–1905), American singer
- Jessie Bates (born 1997), American football player
- Jessie Britt (born 1963), American football player
- Jessie Brown Pounds (1861–1921), American writer of gospel songs
- Jessie Buckland (1878–1939), New Zealand photographer
- Jessie Buckley, Irish entertainer and I'd Do Anything finalist
- Jessie Camacho, American Survivor contestant
- Jessie Cooper (1914–1993), Australian politician
- Jessie Dalman (born 1933), American politician
- Jessie Daniel Ames (1883–1972), American civil rights activist
- Jessie Daniels, American sociologist and professor
- Jessie E. Woods (1909–2001), American pilot
- Jessie Earl (died 1980), English female murder victim
- Jessie Eldridge (born 1997), Canadian ice hockey player
- Jessie Evans, American basketball coach
- Jessie Foster (born 1985), Canadian missing woman
- Jessie Franklin Turner (1881–1956), American fashion designer
- Jessie Fremont O'Donnell (1860–1897), American writer
- Jessie Godderz (born 1986), American actor and professional wrestler
- Jessie Greengrass (born 1982), British poet and author
- Jessie Hester (born 1963), American football player
- Jessie Hollins (1970–2009), American baseball player
- Jessie Inchauspé (born 1992), French biochemist
- Jessie Irvine (disambiguation)
  - Jessie Irvine (born 1989), American professional pickleball player
  - Jessie Seymour Irvine (1836–1887), Scottish musical arranger
- Jessie Isabel Henderson (1866–1951), Australian social welfare worker
- Jessie J (born 1988), British singer
- Jessie Kampman (born 2000), French formula kite surfer
- Jessie Kleemann (born 1959), Greenlandic artist and writer
- Jessie L. Simpson (1882–1974), staff member in the United States Senate
- Jessie Landale Cumberland (1861–1935), British governess and suffragette
- Jessie Lemonier (born 1997), American football player
- Jessie Loutit (born 1988), Canadian rower
- Jessie M. Rattley (1929–2001), American mayor
- Jessie Mackaye, American actress
- Jessie MacWilliams (1917–1990), English mathematician
- Jessie Mae Hemphill (1923–2006), American musician
- Jessie Matthews (1907–1981), British actress and singer
- Jessie McGruder, American politician
- Jessie McKay (born 1989), Australian professional wrestler, ring name Billie Kay
- Jessie McPherson (born 2002), Canadian ice hockey player
- Jessie Misskelley (born 1975), one of the West Memphis 3
- Jessie Murph (born 2004), American singer
- Jessie Oonark (1906–1985), Canadian Inuk artist
- Jessie Pharr Slaton (1908–1983), African-American lawyer.
- Jessie Pope (1868–1941), English World War I poet
- Jessie Preston (1872 - 1962), American metalsmith
- Jessie Redmon Fauset (1882–1961), American writer
- Jessie Rogers (born 1993), Brazilian-American pornographic actress
- Jessie Rooke (1845–1906), Australian suffragette and temperance reformer
- Jessie Rose Innes (1860–1943), South African nurse and suffragist
- Jessie Royce Landis (1896–1972), American actress
- Jessie Seal (born 1991), American politician
- Jessie Stanton (1887–1976), American authority on pre-school education and author
- Jessie Tuggle (born 1965), American football player
- Jessie Usher (born 1992), American actor
- Jessie van Aalst (born 1992), Dutch softball player
- Jessie Wallace (born 1971), British actress
- Jessie Ward (born 1979), American professional wrestler
- Jessie Ward (born 1982), American actress
- Jessie Ware (born 1984), British singer-songwriter
- Jessie Weston (1850–1928), British scholar and folklorist
- Jessie Weston (1867–1939), New Zealand novelist and journalist
- Jessie Woo (born 1990), Hatian-American comedian
- Jessye Norman (1945–2019), American opera singer

== Fictional characters ==
- Jessie (Clay Kids), in the Spanish animated TV series Clay Kids
- Jessie (Pokémon)
- Jessie (Toy Story), in the Toy Story franchise
- Jessie Jackson (Coronation Street), in the soap opera Coronation Street
- Jessie Prescott, main title character of the TV show Jessie

== See also ==
- Jess (disambiguation)
- Jesse (disambiguation)
- Jessi (disambiguation)
- Jessica (disambiguation)
- Jessie (disambiguation)
- Jesus (disambiguation)
