= Jesse (given name) =

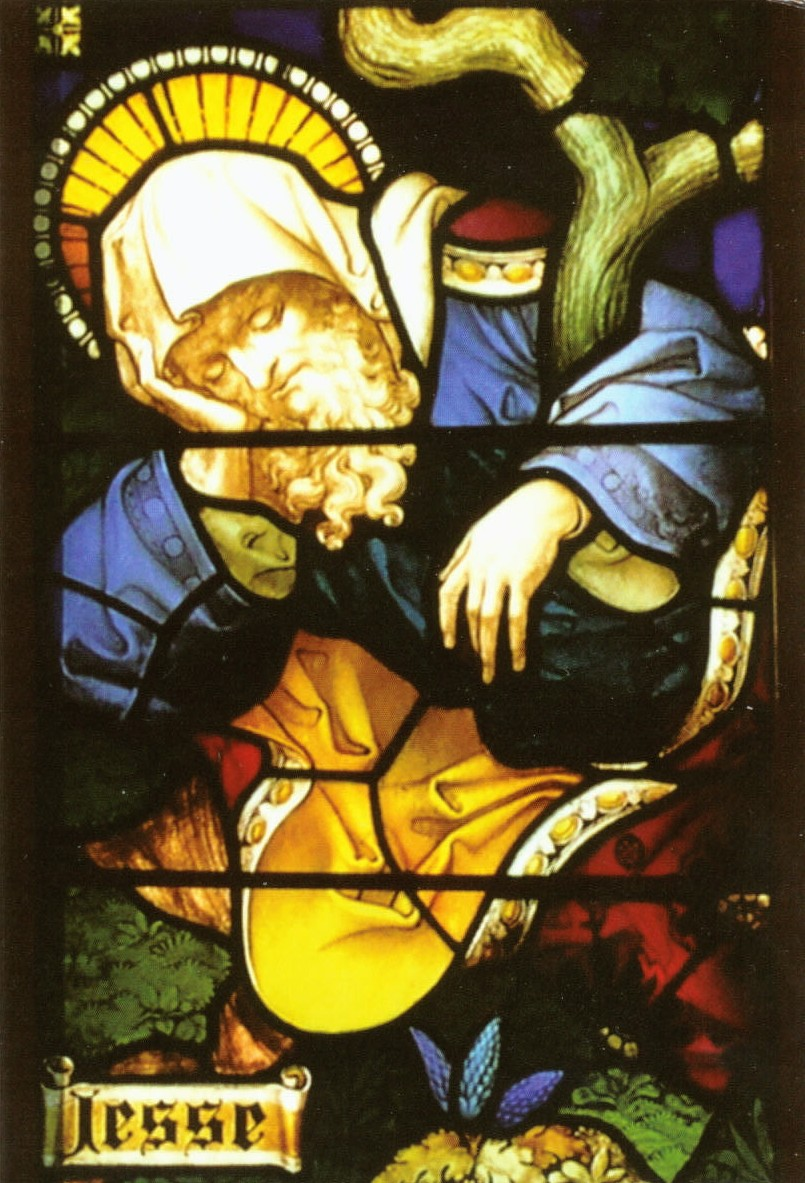
- The Biblical character Jesse, as depicted in a stained glass window in All Saints Church, Hove, England
- Pronunciation: /ˈd͡ʒɛ.si/ (English) /ˈjɛ.sə/ (Dutch)
- Gender: Unisex
- Language: English, Dutch

Origin
- Languages: Hebrew, Greek, Latin, English
- Origin: Anglicisation of Yišay (יִשַׁי)
- Meaning: "King" "God exists"
- Region of origin: North America, Europe, Middle East

Other names
- Variant forms: Jessie; Jessy; Jessey; Jessi; Jessee
- Short form: Jess
- Related names: Jessica, Jesus

Jesse is a given name of Hebrew origin. It derives its popularity from the biblical figure Jesse, father of Israelite monarch David. The English version is derived from the Latin Iesse, borrowed from the Ancient Greek Iessaí (Ἰεσσαί), and ultimately from the Hebrew Yišay (יִשַׁי).

The English name was translated into many languages (especially Romance languages and Greek). It has been a popular given name in many English-speaking countries since the 1880s. Despite being similar in appearance, it is unrelated in origin to the given name Jessica.

== Cognates ==
- Arabic: Yassa (Arabic: يَسَّى)
- Catalan: Jessè
- Czech: Isaj, Jišaj
- Dutch: Isaï, Jesse
- English: Jess (diminutive), Jessie (alternative spelling), Jesse, Jessy (alternative spelling)
- French: Isaï, Isaïe, Jessé
- German: Isai, Jischaj
- Greek: Iessai (Greek: Ἰεσσαί)
- Hebrew: Yishai, Yishay (Hebrew: יִשַׁי, Modern: Yišay, Tiberian: Yīšáy)
- Indonesian: Isai, Jesse
- Italian: Iesse
- Latin: Isai
- Portuguese: Jessé
- Romanian: Isseu
- Russian: Iessej (Cyrillic: Иессей)
- Spanish: Isai, Isaí, Ishai, Jessé
- Tamil: Iesaai

== Actors ==
- Jesse Bradford, American actor
- Jesse Borrego, American actor
- Jesse Draper, American actress
- Jesse Eisenberg, American actor
- Jesse Jane, American pornographic actress
- Jesse Heiman, American actor
- Jesse James Keitel, American actress
- Jesse Metcalfe, American actor
- Jesse Randhawa, Indian actress
- Jesse LaVercombe, Canadian-American actor
- Jesse Lee Soffer, American actor
- Jesse Plemons, American actor
- Jesse Spencer, Australian actor
- Jesse Welles (born 1946), American former actress
- Jesse Williams (actor), American actor
- Jesse Tyler Ferguson, American actor

== Athletes ==
- Jesse, ring name of professional wrestler Ray Gordy
- Jesse Anderson (American football), American professional football player
- Jesse Barfield, professional baseball player
- Jesse Barnes, American professional baseball player
- Jesse Burkett, American professional baseball player, college coach
- Jesse Compher (born 1999), American professional ice hockey player
- Jesse Carlson, American professional baseball player
- Jesse Carver, British football player and manager
- Jesse Chavez, American baseball player
- Jesse Crain, Canadian professional baseball player
- Jesse Davis, American football player
- Jesse Dempsey (born 2005), Irish footballer
- Jesse Robert Donn (born 1999), South American soccer player
- Jesse English, professional baseball player for the Washington Nationals
- Jesse Foppert, professional baseball player
- Jesse Gey (born 1985), American field hockey player
- Jesse Grupper (born 1997), American Olympic rock climber
- Jesse Haines (1893-1978), American baseball player inducted into the Hall of Fame
- Jess Hill (1907–1993), American baseball player, collegiate track and football coach and administrator
- Jesse Hoffmeister, American professional baseball third baseman
- Jesse Iwuji (born 1987), American racing driver
- "Road Dogg" Jesse James (born 1969), American professional wrestler
- Jesse James Wailani Kuhaulua, birth name of sumo rikishi Takamiyama Daigorō
- Jesse Levine (born 1987), American-Canadian professional tennis player
- Jesse Lingard, English professional football player
- Jesse Luketa (born 1999), Canadian-born American football player
- Jesse Lumsden, professional football player, former McMaster University running back
- Jesse Makarounas, Australian footballer
- Jesse McDonald (archer) (born 1988), Australian archer
- Jess Mortensen (1907–1962), American track athlete and coach
- Jesse Orosco, American professional baseball player
- Jesse Owens, American Olympic athlete
- Jesse Palmer, Canadian professional football player, former Bachelor star
- Jesse Puljujärvi, Finnish professional hockey player
- Jesse Ronson (born 1985), Canadian mixed martial artist
- Jesse Ryder, New Zealand cricketer
- Jesse Shugg (born 1992), Filipino footballer
- Jesse Scholtens, American baseball player
- Jesse Scanzano (born 1988), Canadian ice hockey player
- Jesse Southwell (born 2005), Australian football player
- Jesse Sorensen, American professional wrestler
- Jesse Tawhiao-Wardlaw (born 2000), Australian rules footballer
- Jesse Vandenbulcke (born 1996), Belgian professional racing cyclist
- Jesse van de Polder (born 1998), Dutch handball player
- Jesse Winker, American baseball player
- Jesse Woolley (born 2001), English professional footballer

== Criminals ==
- Jesse Anderson, American murderer
- Jesse James, American Wild West outlaw
- Jesse James Hollywood, American kidnapper and murderer
- Jesse Pomeroy, American killer
- Jesse Rugge, American kidnapper, involved in murder

== Musicians ==
- Jesse Anderson (musician) (1940–2014), American blues singer-songwriter and musician
- Jesse Carmichael, keyboard player for the band Maroon 5
- Jesse Cook, Canadian guitarist
- Jesse Davis, American saxophonist
- Jesse Ed Davis (1944–1988), American guitarist
- Jesse Fuller, American one-man-band
- Jesse Harris, American singer-songwriter
- Jesse Huerta, one half of duo Jesse & Joy
- Jesse Hughes, American frontman of the band Eagles of Death Metal
- Jesse Hughes, Canadian DJ and producer, known by stagename Vanic
- Jesse F. Keeler, musician, member of the band Death From Above 1979
- Jesse Lee (born 1986), American country music singer and songwriter
- Jesse Lacey, American frontman for the band Brand New
- Jesse Lott, American artist/producer, known as "Some Nobody"
- Jess Margera, American musician, member of the band CKY
- Jesse McCartney, American singer
- Jesse Michaels, Former frontman for Operation Ivy and Common Rider
- Jesse Pintado, American guitarist, ex-member of Napalm Death and Terrorizer
- Jesse Powell, American R&B singer
- Jesse Palter, American singer-songwriter and recording artist
- Jesse Quin, bassist for British band Keane
- Jesse James Rutherford, American singer/songwriter, member of The Neighbourhood
- Jesse Jo Stark (born 1991), American singer
- Jesse Sykes (born 1967), American singer and songwriter
- Jesse Welles, American singer-songwriter and guitarist
- Jesse Winchester (1944–2014), American singer-songwriter
- Jesse Wood, English singer son of Ronnie Wood
- Jesse Colin Young, American singer/songwriter, member of The Youngbloods

== Politicians ==
- Jesse Matlack Baker, Pennsylvania State Senator and State Representative
- Jesse G. Bowles (1921–2007), Justice of the Supreme Court of Georgia
- Jesse D. Bright, U.S. senator from Indiana
- Jesse Atherton Bynum, Democratic U.S. representative from North Carolina
- Jesse Collings, English reformer, member of Parliament, mayor of Birmingham
- Jesse Leech Davisson (1860–1940), American suffragist active in Ohio
- Jesse Franklin, Democratic-Republic senator and governor of North Carolina
- Jesse Gray, New York civil rights leader and politician
- Jesse Helms, Republican U.S. senator from North Carolina (1973–2003)
- Jesse Jackson (1941–2026), American civil rights activist, politician, and minister
- Jesse Jeremiah, Nauruan MP
- Jesse Klaver, Dutch politician
- Jessé Lopes (born 1982), Brazilian politician
- Jesse Matlack (1821–1893), American politician from Pennsylvania
- Jesse Norman, British Conservative MP for Hereford and South Herefordshire
- Jesse Robredo (1958–2012), Former Mayor of Naga City in the Philippines
- Jesse Six Dijkstra (born 1994), Dutch politician
- Jesse B. Thomas, Democratic-Republican senator from Illinois
- Jesse M. Unruh, Democratic politician, state treasurer of California (1975–1987)
- Jesse Shanahan, American disability activist and Al researcher
- Jesse Styles, American politician
- Jesse Ventura, pro wrestler and governor of Minnesota
- Jesse Johnson Yeates, Democratic U.S. representative from North Carolina
- Jesse A. Younger, Republican U.S. representative from California

== Scientists ==
- Jesse L. Greenstein, American astronomer
- Jesse William Lazear, American physician
- Jesse Ramsden, English inventor
- Jesse Lowen Shearer, American engineer
- Jesse Ehrenfeld, American physician
- Jesse K. Marden, American physician

== Others ==
- Jesse, father of David
- Jesse Abramson (1904–1979), American sports writer
- Jesse Alto, American poker player
- Jesse Applegate, American pioneer
- Jesse Baird (1997–2024), Australian television presenter and Australian rules football goal umpire
- Jesse Blackadder (1964–2020), Australian novelist, screenwriter and journalist
- Jesse L. Brown, American aviator, first African-American naval aviator
- Jesse Camp, former MTV personality
- Jesse Chabot, Canadian screenwriter
- Jesse Cox (broadcaster) (1986–2017), Australian radio producer, broadcaster and documentary maker
- Jesse Cox (YouTuber), American YouTube gaming personality
- Jesse Curry (1913–1980), chief of the Dallas police when John F. Kennedy was assassinated there
- Jesse Dirkhising (1986–1999), American murder victim
- Jesse Duke, American former slave, activist, newspaper editor
- Jesse Dylan, American film and video director, son of Bob Dylan
- Jesse February (born 1997), South African chess player
- Jesse Genet, American businesswoman
- Jesse Honey, English quiz player and winner of BBC Mastermind 2010
- Jesse Horn, American writer and illustrator
- Jesse Hughes, American frontiersman
- Jesse James (television personality), American custom motorcycle builder and TV personality
- Jesse Lee Kercheval (born 1956), American poet
- Jesse L. Lasky (1880–1958), American film producer
- Jesse L. Lasky Jr. (1910–1988), American writer
- Jesse Fuller McDonald (1858–1942), American public official, civil engineer and surveyor
- Jesse Mockrin (born 1981), American artist
- Jesse Clyde Nichols, American real estate developer
- Jesse B. Oldendorf, American Navy admiral
- Jesse Riedel (born 1999), American YouTuber
- Jesse Seligman (1827–1894), German-American banker
- Jesse Q. Sutanto, Chinese-Indonesian author
- Jesse Sheidlower, lexicographer
- Jesse Shwayder (1882–1970), American businessman, founder of the Samsonite Corporation
- Jesse Walker, American journalist and historian
- Jesse Watters (born 1978), American political commentator
- Jesse Wellens, American YouTuber

== Fictional characters ==
- Jesse, the protagonist of Minecraft: Story Mode
- Jesse, the only boy of The Teens and one of the recurring characters from an American-Canadian animated series Peg + Cat
- Jesse, one of the troopers of the 501st Legion from Star Wars: The Clone Wars
- Jesse, from an adult animated sitcom, Solar Opposites
- Jesse, in a Canadian animated series, Looped (TV series)
- Jesse, an anthropomorphic tow truck in the children's TV show Finley the Fire Engine
- Jesse Aarons, in the book Bridge to Terabithia
- Jesse Anderson, from a Japanese anime series, Yu-Gi-Oh! GX
- Jesse Chambers, a DC comic book superhero
- Jesse Cosay, one of the main characters from Infinity Train
- Jesse Custer, in the comic book series Preacher
- Jesse Doe, a fictional 80-year-old man who was said to have been found dead under an overpass in San Diego, California and was said to have been identified as being Elvis Presley
- Jesse Duke (Dukes of Hazzard), from the TV show and movie The Dukes of Hazzard
- Jesse Glenn, Gundalian Ventus Brawler from the animated series Bakugan: Gundalian Invaders
- Jesse Fitzgerald, from a 2009 American film My Sister's Keeper (film)
- Jesse Hall, one of the characters from The Mighty Ducks (1992 film) and D2: The Mighty Ducks
- Jesse Katsopolis, in the TV sitcom Full House
- Jesse McCree, from the video game Overwatch (2016 video game)
- Jesse McNally, in the TV Show Buffy the Vampire Slayer
- Jesse Pinkman, in the TV series Breaking Bad
- Jesse Porter, a burned spy who works with Michael on USA's Burn Notice
- Jesse Ramirez, from the TV show Roswell
- Jesse St. James, from the American TV series Glee
- Jesse Stefanovic, in the Canadian TV series Degrassi: The Next Generation
- Jesse Stone, from the detective movies based on the Jesse Stone novels by Robert B. Parker
- Jesse Wallace, the protagonist from the Before trilogy.
- Jesse Warner, the title character from a 1998–2000 sitcom Jesse (TV series).
- Jesse Wells, a recurring character in The Flash

== See also ==
- Jessye, given name and surname
- Jesse (disambiguation)
