= Jess =

Jess is a unisex given name, often a short form (hypocorism) of Jessica, Jesse, Jessie, Jessy, Jesswin and a surname. It may refer to:

== Given name or nickname ==
- Jess Atkinson (born 1961), American football player
- Jess Birtcher, American politician
- Jess Cain (1926–2008), American radio host
- Jess Cates (born 1976), American songwriter
- Jess Chanliau, American-French actor
- Jess Collins (1923–2004), American visual artist
- Jess Conrad (born 1936), British actor
- Jess H. Dickinson (born 1947), American judge
- Jess E. DuBois (1934–2022), American painter
- Jess Folley (born 2003), English singer
- Jess Glynne (born 1989), English singer and songwriter
- Jess Goldoni, American politician
- Jess Hahn (1921–1998), American actor
- Jess Harnell (born 1963), American voice actor
- Jess Hartley (born 1967), American writer
- Jess Herbst (born 1958), American politician
- Jess Hill (1907–1993), American athlete and coach
- Jess Hill, Australian investigative reporter and author
- Jess Hilarious (born 1992), American comedian
- Jess Stonestreet Jackson, Jr. (1930–2011), American wine entrepreneur
- Jess Klein (born 1974), American singer/songwriter
- Jess Liaudin (born 1973), French mixed martial artist
- Jess Lee (Canadian singer), Canadian country music singer
- Jess Lee (Malaysian singer) (born 1988)
- Jess Margera (born 1978), American drummer
- Jess McMahon (1882–1954), American professional wrestling and professional boxing promoter, patriarch of the McMahon family of businesspeople and promoters
- Jess Mortensen (1907–1962), American multi-sport college athlete and track-and-field coach
- Jess Mowry (born 1960), American author
- Jess Mruzik (born 2002), American volleyball player
- Jess Nevins (born 1966), American author
- Jess No Limit (born 1996), Indonesian YouTuber
- Jess Oppenheimer (1913–1988), American television writer
- Jess Pepper, Scottish environmentalist, charity worker, founder of the Climate Café initiative
- Jess Phillips (disambiguation)
- Jess J. Present (1921–1998), American politician
- Jess Richardson (1930–1975), American football player
- Jess Robbins (1886–1973), American film director
- Jess Roden (born 1947), British musician
- Jess Roskelley (1982–2019), American mountaineer
- Jess Row (born 1974), American writer
- Jess Simpson (disambiguation)
- Jess Stacy (1904–1995), American jazz pianist
- Jess Stearn (1914–2002), American journalist and author
- Jess Thomas (1927–1993), American opera singer
- Jess Thorup (born 1970), Danish former footballer
- Jess Vanstrattan (born 1982), Australian soccer player
- Jess von der Ahe (born 1966), American artist
- Jess Walter (born 1965), American author
- Jess Walton (born 1949), American actress
- Jess Weixler (born 1981), American actress
- Jess Willard (1881–1968), American boxer
- Jess Winfield (born 1961), American writer
- Jess Yates (1918–1993), British television presenter

== Surname ==
- Carl Jess (1884–1948), Australian Army lieutenant general
- Eoin Jess (born 1970), Scottish former footballer
- Jim Jess (born 1955), retired Australian rules football player
- John Jess (1922–2003), Australian politician
- Matt Jess (born 1984), English rugby union player
- Tyehimba Jess (born 1965), American poet
- Walter Jess (born 1942), Canadian politician
- Zuleika Jess, Jamaican politician

== Fictional characters ==
- Jess Bhamra, in the 2002 film Bend It Like Beckham
- Jess Bradley, the confidant/protégé/lover/scapegoat of James Stillwell in the comic book series The Boys
- Jess Mariano, in the television series Gilmore Girls
- Jess (Misfits), in the British television series Misfits
- Jess (New Girl), the eponymous New Girl on the FOX sitcom
- Jess Riley, playable character in the survival horror game Until Dawn
- Jess Squirrel, in the Redwall novels by Brian Jacques
- Jess Tamblyn, in the Saga of Seven Suns novels by Kevin J. Anderson
- Jess Warner, in the Australian soap opera Wentworth
- Jess the cat, in the Postman Pat universe
- Jess(e), in the video game Minecraft: Story Mode
- Jess Chambers, in The Flash series finale
- Jess McConnell, American Girl character

== See also ==
- Jes (disambiguation)
- Jesus (name)
- Jess (programming language)
