= Jessee =

Jessee is a given name and surname. It is a variant spelling of Jesse or Jessie.

== Given name ==
- Jessee Wyatt (born 1996), Australian Paralympic athlete

== Surname ==
The 2010 United States census found 4,108 people with the surname Jessee, making it the 8,067th-most-common name in the country, compared with 3,952 people (7,752nd-most-common) in the 2000 Census. In both censuses, more than 95% of the bearers of the surname identified as white.

- Dan Jessee (1901–1970), American baseball player
- Margaret Jessee (1921–2001), American tennis player and vintner
- Dean C. Jessee (1929–2025), American historian
- Jason Jessee (born 1969), American professional skateboarder
- Darren Jessee (born 1971), American drummer

== See also ==
- McGarrah Jessee, American marketing company founded in 1996
- Jessee/Miller Field, football field, named in part for Dan Jessee
- Jessey
- Jessy (disambiguation)
