= Black ghost =

Black ghost may refer to:

- Black ghost knifefish, a South American tropical fish
- The Black Ghost, a vigilante in the serial The Last Frontier
- The Black Ghosts, an English electronic music duo
- Ju-On: Black Ghost, a 2009 Japanese horror film
- Black Ghost, an evil organization in the anime Cyborg 009
- The Black Ghost Bandit, a 1915 American silent short Western directed by Tom Ricketts
- The Black Ghosts (short story), a short story written by Chinese author Pu Songling
- The Black Ghost, a 1970 Dodge Challenger R/T SE owned by street racer and Detroit Police Department motorcycle officer Godfrey Qualls, listed on the National Historical Vehicle Register

== See also ==
- Black dog (ghost)
- Ghosts In the Black
