= Jess Hartley =

American writer and game designer

- Born: Christina K. Hartley; December 11, 1967 (age 58); San Rafael, California, U.S.
- Occupations: Novelist, writer
- Writing career
- Period: 2000–present
- Genres: Fantasy, Role Playing Games, Historical fantasy
- Website: jesshartley.com

Christina K. "Jess" Hartley (born December 11, 1967) is an American novelist, writer, game creator, and editor.

Hartley is the author of the novel Exalted: In Northern Twilight published by White Wolf Publishing, and Little Yoshida, a novel published as an electronic serial, by Mind Storm Labs. She has been an author of, and contributing writer to, nearly forty role-playing games and game products (RPG) books from White Wolf Publishing/CCP North America, and Margaret Weis Productions, as well as the editor for several projects from Steampower Publishing and Rogue Games.

From 2002 to 2005, Hartley produced the ongoing feature article, Forsoothly Spoken, for Renaissance Magazine as well as doing book reviews for the publication.

In August 2009, Hartley debuted One Geek To Another, an advice, ethics and etiquette blog for the geek community. In 2010, One Geek To Another was nominated for an ENnie Award in the category of Best Blog.

Hartley was born in San Rafael, California and raised in the Willamette Valley of Oregon. She lived for several years in Easthampton, Massachusetts and then in Bisbee, Arizona. In October 2010, she returned to her native NW, and now resides in Gresham, Oregon.

== Current projects ==
- The Shattered Glass Project- An urban fairy tale story and an experiment in patronage sponsored art.

== Published works ==
=== Novels ===
- Little Yoshida (2010) PDF Download
- Exalted: In Northern Twilight (2004) ISBN 1-58846-861-5

=== Short stories and anthologies ===
- Hunger's Child, in Human Tales (2011) ISBN 0-9830993-3-2
- To Duty Bound, in The Crimson Pact, Volume 1 (2011) ISBN 0-9832631-5-9
- Stigmatized Property, in Buried Tales of Pinebox, Texas (2009) ISBN 0-9819637-2-2

=== Essays and nonfiction ===
- Rolling In the Aisles, in Bones: Us and Our Dice (2010) ISBN 0-9818840-1-6
- Zooloretto, in Family Games: The 100 Best (2010) ISBN 1-934547-21-2
- Conventions for the Aspiring Game Professional (2009) PDF Download

=== Role-playing games and supplements ===
- The Fear-Maker's Promise Compendium (2011) ISBN 978-1-58846-464-4
- Supernatural Adventures (2010) ISBN 1-931567-63-8
- Goblin Markets (Changeling: The Lost) (2010) PDF Download
- City in the Sand (Mind's Eye Theater – Vampire: The Requiem) (2010) PDF Download
- Personae – Ready Made Characters (Changeling: The Lost) (2009) PDF Download
- Nosferatu – The Beast That Hunts The Blood (Vampire: The Requiem) (2009) ISBN 1-58846-351-6
- Geist: The Sin-Eaters (2009) ISBN 1-58846-377-X
- Collection of Horrors: No Escape (Hunter: The Vigil) (2009) PDF Download
- Slashers (Hunter: The Vigil) (2009) ISBN 1-58846-744-9
- Swords at Dawn (Changeling: The Lost) (2009) ISBN 1-58846-370-2
- Dancers in the Dusk (Changeling: The Lost) (2009) ISBN 1-58846-361-3
- The Selfish Succubus (Instant Antagonists) (2009) PDF Download
- The Rose-Bride's Plight (Changeling: The Lost) (2008) PDF Download
- Innocents (World of Darkness)(2008) ISBN 1-58846-713-9
- Scion: God (Scion)(2008) ISBN 1-58846-470-9
- Rites of Spring (Changeling: The Lost)(2008) ISBN 1-58846-716-3
- Midnight Roads (World of Darkness) (2008) ISBN 1-58846-712-0
- Lords of Summer (Changeling: The Lost) (2008) ISBN 1-58846-715-5
- The Silver Ladder (Mage: The Awakening) (2008) ISBN 1-58846-438-5
- Hunter: The Vigil (2008) ISBN 1-58846-718-X
- Witch Finders (Hunter: The Vigil) (2008) ISBN 1-58846-722-8
- Autumn Nightmares (Changeling: The Lost) (2007) ISBN 1-58846-531-4
- Reliquary (World of Darkness) (2007) ISBN 1-58846-492-X
- The Mysterium (Mage: The Awakening) (2007) ISBN 1-58846-434-2
- The Free Council (Mage: The Awakening) (2007) ISBN 1-58846-432-6
- Changeling: The Lost (2007) ISBN 1-58846-527-6
- Scion: Demigod (Scion) (2007) ISBN 1-58846-469-5
- Saturnine Nights (Promethean: The Created) (2007) ISBN 1-58846-609-4
- Magnum Opus (Promethean: The Created) (2007) ISBN 1-58846-608-6
- Strange Alchemies (Promethean: The Created) (2006) ISBN 1-58846-607-8
- Pandoras Book (Promethean: The Created) (2006) ISBN 1-58846-488-1
- Compass of the Celestial Directions 1 – The Blessed Isle (Exalted) (2006) ISBN 1-58846-690-6
- Skinchangers (World of Darkness) (2006) ISBN 1-58846-335-4
- Predators (Werewolf: The Forsaken) (2005) ISBN 1-58846-326-5

=== Editing and development roles ===
- Reliquary (World of Darkness for White Wolf Publishing – Developer (2008)
- The Future Soldier's Battlefield Handbook for Steampower Publishing – Editor (2007)
- The Lemurian Candidate for Steampower Publishing – Editor (2006)

== Media mentions ==
Jess Hartley has appeared in the following newspaper and magazine articles, websites and podcasts.

=== Websites and blogs ===
- Flames Rising: Interviewed with Eddy Webb, Monica Valentinelli and Kelley Barnes on 7 April 2011; The Shattered Glass Project on 21 March 2010; Guest Blog – 13 Halloween Etiquette Tips From One Geek To Another; Interviewed on August 13, 2008, by Jeremy Jones: Jess Hartley, Freelance Author & Editor Interview
- The Successful Dilettante: Interviewed on April 20, 2007, by Susan Henderson.
- The Escapist: Appeared on Tell Me About Your Character on May 19, 2006.

=== Podcasts ===
- RPG Countdown: Jess appeared on the following episodes: 22 April 2009 (Collection of Horrors), 15 July 2009 (Ready-Made Player Characters (Changeling: The Lost)), 12 August 2009 (City in the Sand), 9 September 2009 (Geist: The Sin-Eaters).
- Tri Tac Games Podcast: Jess appeared on the following episodes: 14 March 2011 (Episode 61: Gender Issues with Jess Hartley).
- Fear The Boot Jess appeared on the following episodes: 29 July 2007 (Interview Episode 4 – Changeling: The Lost)

=== Video appearances ===
- GamesU 2009: Women in Gaming panel, featuring Jess Hartley, Monica Valentinelli and Juliet Meyers, 2009
- Planet Access. Live Video Interview Recorded at Connecticon 2007.
