= Ghosts In the Black =

Science fiction tabletop game adventure

Ghosts in the Black is the fifth title published for Margaret Weis Productions, Ltd's Firefly Role-Playing Game. Robin Laws described his concept for the adventures contained in this supplement as "a pastiche of a property which itself has a heavy element of pastiche in it, because it's a space opera which is actually a tribute to the classic westerns."

== Contents ==
Ghosts In the Black is a full-length adventure campaign designed by award-winning game designer Robin Laws for the Firefly RPG. The campaign is presented in five interconnected adventures which can either be run consecutively in a single story arc, or as individual adventures. When played as a campaign, player characters get caught up in the mystery of a missing Alliance vessel called the Westlake. Firefly Role-Playing Game brand manager Monica Valentinelli described the Westlake as "a ghost ship from the Unification War—so there's this legendary battleship that's out there, somewhere, in the black—it's got all these rumors about it." In the course of the adventures, the player characters are able to collect enough of these rumors to set out in search of the Westlake themselves.

Ghosts In the Black describes its own campaign premise as follows:

Some folk think that the Westlake disappeared after the first battle of the war. Other travelers believe it happened later on, right before the Battle of Serenity Valley. Before it vanished, the Westlake, a luxury liner originally commandeered as an Alliance troopship, had been modified for prisoner transport. On its run from Hera to Londinium it up and vanished, along with its cargo of Independent POWs and a treasure trove of secrets. ...'Ghosts In the Black' gives you and your Crew the opportunity to conclude the Westlake saga, from a false glimmer that establishes its legend in your game, to the final revelation of its mysteries.'

=== Included adventures ===
- Six Cylinders Make a Right
- Prisoner 3102Y
- Tombstone Bullets and a Graveyard Mind
- Hellhound Trail
- The Big Dark

== Production notes ==
Robin Laws has said that he was approached about writing "a campaign of interlocking adventures" for the Firefly Role-Playing Game at Gen Con 2013, and that he accepted because his "wife would really love it" and "would gladly participate in that homework" if he had to watch all of the shows from the original series again.

Although ICv2 initially reported that Ghosts In the Black would be released in April 2015, the supplement wasn't officially announced on the Margaret Weis Productions, Ltd website until May 5, 2015. Retailer Amazon.com, Inc. provides an actual release date of July 22, 2015. "Ghosts in the Black" was one of the prizes offered in the Lone Wolf Challenge at Gen Con 2015.

== Reception ==
Thomas Robert for Casus Belli reviewed this book along with Smuggler's Guide to the Rim and Things Don't Go Smooth, and said that the scenarios available for the game provided a campaign ready for use, even if the scenarios are often stereotyped and sometimes offer less easy frameworks to adapt to any crew.
