= Echoes of War: Thrillin' Heroics =

Firefly Role-Playing Game supplement

Echoes of War: Thrillin' Heroics is the first title published for Margaret Weis Productions, Ltd's Firefly Role-Playing Game. This supplement was awarded an ENnie Judges' Spotlight Award at Gen Con 2015.

== Contents ==
Echoes of War collected four digital adventures for the Firefly RPG, (including the adventure "Wedding Planners" by The New York Times bestselling author Margaret Weis), and published them together under a single cover. Echoes of War also included a basic set of rules, statistics for all nine crew characters from the Firefly TV show, twelve new character archetypes, and basic ship rules. The adventures in this book all deal with themes of loss and renewal in the aftermath of the Unification War. Each adventure was illustrated with original artwork and presented in a five-to-six act structure.

In its review of Echoes of War, the gaming site Reviews from R'lyeh noted that this title's inclusion of a basic set of rules for the Firefly RPG "means that Firefly Echoes of War: Thrillin' Heroics is a standalone book that can be run using just the rules it contains, or it can be run with access to either version of the rulebook."

This is how Firefly Role-Playing Game brand manager Monica Valentinelli described the original concept for this digital series of adventures in 2013, a year before their print publication:

The logistics of doing a full core book for Gen Con [2013] just wasn't possible, but what we are doing instead, is, we're going to have the Echoes of War line. It's a digital line of adventures, and each adventure ties back to, or has something to do with, the Unification War. ...Wedding Planners is by Margaret, and then Shooting Fish is by an writer named Andrew Peregrine... those two both have something to do with the Unification War, and you find out what as the adventures continues. But we're going to be releasing those [in digital format] on a regular basis leading up to [the release of] the core book, so that if people want to play a one-shot or a couple of sessions, just to have fun, there's plenty of game material in each one."

The included adventures were written by Margaret Weis, Andrew Peregrine, Monica Valentinelli, and Nicole Wakelin. Featured artists included Ben Mund, Beth Sobel, Jennifer Rodgers, Kurt Komoda, and Melissa Gay.

=== Included Adventures ===
- Wedding Planners
- Shooting Fish
- Friends in Low Places
- Freedom Flyer

== Production and release information ==
Echoes of War was initially released at Gen Con 2014.

== Industry Awards ==
Winner, 2015 ENnie Judges' Spotlight Award

== Review ==
- Casus Belli (v4, Issue 12 - Nov/Dec 2014)
