= Jessie =

Jessie may refer to:

== People and fictional characters ==
- Jessie (given name), including a list of people and fictional characters
- Jessie (surname), a list of people

== Arts and entertainment ==
- Jessie (2011 TV series), a 2011–15 Disney Channel sitcom
- Jessie (1984 TV series), a series starring Lindsay Wagner
- Jessie (film), a 2016 Indian film
- "Jessie" (Joshua Kadison song), 1993
- "Jessie" (Paw song), 1993
- "Jessie", by Uriah Heep from the album Outsider
- Jessie Richardson Theatre Award, also known as the Jessie Award

== Places ==
=== Australia ===
- Jessie, South Australia, a former town
- Jessie Island, Queensland, Australia

=== Canada ===
- Jessie Lake, Alberta, Canada

=== South Orkney Islands ===
- Jessie Bay, South Orkney Islands, north-east of Antarctica

=== United States ===
- Jessie, North Dakota, United States, a census-designated place
- Lake Jessie (Winter Haven, Florida), United States
- Lake Jessie (North Dakota), United States

== Technology ==
- Jessie, the codename of version 8 of the Debian Linux operating system

== See also ==
- Jess (disambiguation)
- Jesse (disambiguation)
- Jessi (disambiguation)
- Jessy (disambiguation)
- Jesus (disambiguation)
- Jessica (disambiguation)
- Jassie, fictional character played by Tara Sutaria in Oye Jassie, the Indian adaptation of the Disney sitcom
