= Firefly Role-Playing Game =

Science fiction tabletop role-playing game

- Cover of the core book
- Designers: Monica Valentinelli; Cam Banks
- Publishers: Margaret Weis Productions, Ltd
- Publication: 2014
- Genres: Science fantasy
- Systems: Cortex Plus

The Firefly Role-Playing Game is a science fiction tabletop role-playing game released in 2014, written by Monica Valentinelli and set in the universe of the Joss Whedon television show Firefly. Firefly takes place in a space Western setting where high technology mixes with frontier life on newly terraformed planets. It was produced by Margaret Weis Productions, Ltd, and uses the "Cortex Action" variant of the Cortex Plus game system.

== Licensing ==
Although the Firefly RPG is sometimes mistaken for a spin-off from Margaret Weis Production's earlier Serenity Role Playing Game, the two games were produced under separate licenses and utilize very different game systems. In an interview with BoardGameGeekTV, line developer and lead writer Monica Valentinelli described the differences between the two licenses this way:

In 2005, Margaret Weis Productions put out another game called the Serenity RPG. ... [The Firefly RPG] is only based on the TV show—it's a completely different license. It's really kind of fascinating how that works because a lot of fans didn't realise that Universal put out the movie and Fox [put out the TV show]. ... From a business standpoint they're two separate things, but from a universe / continuity standpoint they're not.

Margaret Weis, the game's publisher, expressed surprised about receiving a license to produce the Firefly role-playing game.

== System ==
Monica Valentinelli explained the game systems' design process in an interview with Dungeon Crawlers Radio:

Margaret's vision for the game was to make it really fun and easy to play. But we kind of had a really interesting situation because we have fans of Margaret Weis Productions that remember when the Serenity RPG came out and played the Cortex System, and then for the past eight years we've also had the Cortex Plus system in its various iterations... So, what we did was went back to the drawing board, and our systems team developed a game based on Margaret's wish for this to be easy to play, but also give somewhat of a nod to our roots, without essentially shutting off everything that's been done in the last eight years. So, what we have is a new streamlined system that's been adapted for Firefly.

Cortex Plus—unlike its predecessor, the Cortex System, which was used in the Serenity RPG—is a roll-and-keep system, in which players roll one die from each of several categories and keep the two highest dice in their dice pool. Cortex Plus uses polyhedral dice common to many role-playing games and uses standard dice notation, ranging from d4 (a 4-sided tetrahedral die) to d12 (a 12-sided dodecahedron die). The cubed d6 is the "default" die used in the game.

Cortex Plus uses dice pools ranging from d4 (terrible) to d12 (the best possible). Every die in the dice pool that rolls a natural 1 (called an 'Opportunity') not only doesn't count toward the total but also causes some form of negative consequence for the characters to overcome. Players may voluntarily reduce some of the dice in their pool to a d4, decreasing their likelihood of success and increasing the likelihood of a negative consequence, in exchange for "Plot Points" which may be spent in several ways to influence the game's plot.

== Published books and supplements ==
As of 2016, Margaret Weis Productions has published six titles in the Firefly Role-Playing Game line: a beta preview of the rules, the core rules, and four printed supplements. The publisher has also released a digital adventure for the game which hasn't as yet been collected in any of its print materials.

== Publication history ==
Gaming in the 'Verse was a preview of the Firefly Role-Playing Game which included a beta edition of the rules, a quick-start character generation system, and two complete adventures: "Wedding Planners" and "Shooting Fish." Both of these adventures were later reprinted in the Echoes of War: Thrillin Heroics supplement.

The core rulebook, Firefly Role-Playing Game begins with an episode summary of the Firefly television show, which provides the game's setting.

== Supplements ==
=== Echoes of War: Thrillin' Heroics ===
Echoes of War: Thrillin' Heroics was the first supplement. It was awarded an ENnie Judges' Spotlight Award at Gen Con 2015.

Echoes of War collected four digital adventures for the Firefly RPG (two of which had previously appeared in the Gaming in the 'Verse preview edition) and published them together under a single cover. Echoes of War also included a basic set of rules, statistics for all nine crew characters from the Firefly TV show, twelve new character archetypes, and basic ship rules. The adventures in this book all deal with themes of loss and renewal in the aftermath of the Unification War. Each adventure was illustrated with original artwork and presented in a five-to-six act structure.

In its review of Echoes of War, the gaming site Reviews from R'lyeh noted that this title's inclusion of a basic set of rules for the Firefly RPG "means that Firefly Echoes of War: Thrillin' Heroics is a standalone book that can be run using just the rules it contains, or it can be run with access to either version of the rulebook."

The included adventures were written by Margaret Weis, Andrew Peregrine, Monica Valentinelli, and Nicole Wakelin. Featured artists included Ben Mund, Beth Sobel, Jennifer Rodgers, Kurt Komoda, and Melissa Gay.

=== Bucking the Tiger ===
Bucking the Tiger is a full-length adventure for the Firefly Role-Playing Game which has only been published in a digital format. It was available for download at the DriveThruRPG web site.

=== Things Don't Go Smooth ===
Things Don't Go Smooth is the second supplement. It utilizes the Cortex Plus system. Things Don't Go Smooth introduces four new types of non-player characters for Firefly campaigns, and offers advice on how to handle Reaver encounters using the Cortex Plus system. It also includes new rules introducing scene Triggers, a random adventure generator, and two new adventures.

=== Smuggler's Guide to the Rim ===
Smuggler's Guide to the Rim is the third supplement. It presents several planetary systems in the Firefly game setting in gazetteer format and expands the game's rules. The Smuggler's Guide to the Rim provides expanded setting information for the Blue Sun and Kalidasa Systems, including secret trade routes, places for player characters to hide out, and new game rules for character reputation. It also includes twelve new player character archetypes and several new ship designs. The Smuggler's Guide also includes two new adventures, including one adventure written by Margaret Weis.

=== Ghosts in the Black ===
Ghosts In the Black was the fourth supplement. Robin Laws described his concept for the adventures contained in this supplement as "a pastiche of a property which itself has a heavy element of pastiche in it, because it's a space opera which is actually a tribute to the classic Westerns."

The campaign is presented in five interconnected adventures which can either be run consecutively in a single story arc, or as individual adventures. When played as a campaign, player characters get caught up in the mystery of a missing Alliance vessel called the Westlake. Firefly Role-Playing Game brand manager Monica Valintinelli described the Westlake as "a ghost ship from the Unification War—so there's this legendary battleship that's out there, somewhere, in the black—it's got all these rumors about it." In the course of the adventures, the player characters are able to collect enough of these rumours to set out in search of the Westlake themselves.

Ghosts In the Black describes its own campaign premise as follows:

Some folk think that the Westlake disappeared after the first battle of the war. Other travelers believe it happened later on, right before the Battle of Serenity Valley. Before it vanished, the Westlake, a luxury liner originally commandeered as an Alliance troopship, had been modified for prisoner transport. On its run from Hera to Londinium it up and vanished, along with its cargo of Independent POWs and a treasure trove of secrets. 'Ghosts In the Black' gives you and your Crew the opportunity to conclude the Westlake saga, from a false glimmer that establishes its legend in your game, to the final revelation of its mysteries.'

Robin Laws has said that he was approached about writing "a campaign of interlocking adventures" for the Firefly Role-Playing Game at Gen Con 2013, and that he accepted because his "wife would really love it" and "would gladly participate in that homework" if he had to watch all of the shows from the original series again.

Although ICv2 initially reported that Ghosts In the Black would be released in April 2015, the supplement wasn't officially announced on the Margaret Weis Productions, Ltd website until 5 May 2015. Retailer Amazon.com, Inc. provides an actual release date of 22 July 2015. "Ghosts in the Black" was one of the prizes offered in the Lone Wolf Challenge at Gen Con 2015.

== Complete list of published adventures for Firefly Role-Playing Game ==
- Wedding Planners by Margaret Weis (published in Gaming in the 'Verse and Echoes of War)
- Shooting Fish by Andrew Peregrine (published in Gaming in the 'Verse and Echoes of War)
- What's Yours is Mine by Monica Valentinelli (published in Firefly Role-Playing Game Core Book)
- Friends in Low Places by Monica Valentinelli (published in Echoes of War)
- Freedom Flyer by Nicole Wakelin (published in Echoes of War)
- Bucking the Tiger by Rob Wieland (digital format only)
- Merciless by Monica Valentinelli (published in Things Don't Go Smooth]
- Thieves in Heaven by Monica Valentinelli (published in Things Don't Go Smooth]
- All In the Family by Margaret Weis (published in Smuggler's Guide to the Rim]
- Circling the Wagons by Monica Valentinelli (published in Smuggler's Guide to the Rim]
- Six Cylinders Make a Right by Robin Laws (published in Ghosts in the Black)
- Prisoner 3102Y by Robin Laws (published in Ghosts in the Black)
- Tombstone Bullets and a Graveyard Mind by Robin Laws (published in Ghosts in the Black)
- Hellhound Trail by Robin Laws (published in Ghosts in the Black)
- The Big Dark by Robin Laws (published in Ghosts in the Black)

== Industry awards and nominations for Firefly Role-Playing ==
- 2014 Second Runner-Up for Golden Geek Awards Game of the Year
- 2014 The Escapist Game of the Year Nominee
- 2015 ENnie Nominee for Best Game
- 2015 ENnie Nominee for Product of the Year
- 2015 Origins Award Nominee
- 2015 ENnie Judges' Spotlight Award Winner for Echoes of War: Thrillin' Heroics

== Reviews ==
- Casus Belli (v4, Issue 12 - Nov/Dec 2014)
