= Jesse =

Jesse may refer to:

== People ==
- Jesse (given name), including a list of people
- Jesse (surname), a list of people

== Music ==
- Jesse (album), a 2003 album by Jesse Powell
- "Jesse" (song), a 1980 song by Carly Simon
- "Jesse", a 1973 song by Janis Ian from the 1974 album Stars, also covered by Roberta Flack on Killing Me Softly and by Joan Baez
- "Jesse", a song from the album Valotte by Julian Lennon
- "Jesse", a song from the album The People Tree by Mother Earth
- "Jesse", a song from the album The Drift by Scott Walker
- "Jesse", a song from the album If I Were Your Woman by Stephanie Mills
- "Jesse", a song from the album Donda 2 by Kanye West

== Other ==
- Jesse (film), a 1988 American television film
- Jesse (TV series), a sitcom starring Christina Applegate
- Jesse (novel), a 1994 novel by Gary Soto
- Jesse (picture book), a 1988 children's book by Tim Winton
- Jesse, the main protagonist of the video game Minecraft Story Mode
- Jesse, West Virginia, an unincorporated community
- Jesse Hall, University of Missouri, named in honor of Richard Henry Jesse

== See also ==
- Jess (disambiguation)
- Jessi (disambiguation)
- Jessy (disambiguation)
- Jessie (disambiguation)
