= Jesse McDonald =

Jesse McDonald may refer to:

- Jesse Fuller McDonald (1858–1942), American public official, civil engineer and surveyor
- Jesse McDonald (archer) (born 1988), Australian archer
