= Lake Jessie =

Lake Jessie may refer to the following places in the United States:

- Lake Jessie (Winter Haven, Florida)
- Lake Jessie (North Dakota)
- Lake Jessie Township, Itasca County, Minnesota

== See also ==
- Jessie Lake, Alberta, Canada
