= Jessy =

Jessy may refer to:

== Given name ==
- Jessy Blackburn (1894–1995), British aviation pioneer
- Jessy Bulbo (born 1974), Mexican singer-songwriter
- Jessy Benet (born 1995), French professional footballer
- Jessy Chen (born 1990), Australian Paralympic table tennis player
- Jessy Chahal, celebrity in Malaysia
- Jessy Caicedo (born 1999), Ecuadorian footballer
- Jessy Caron, guitarist and bass guitarist of the Canadian indie pop band Men I Trust
- Jessy De Smet (born 1976), Belgian dance music singer
- Jessy Deminguet (born 1998), French professional footballer
- Jessy Dixon (1938–2011), American gospel music singer, songwriter, and pianist
- Jessy Druyts (born 1994), Belgian professional racing cyclist
- Jessy Eckerman (born 1979), Ålandic politician
- Jessy Franco (born 1998), Gibraltarian sprinter
- Jessy Greene, violinist, cellist and vocalist from Sheffield, Massachusetts
- Jessy W. Grizzle, American engineer
- Jessy Hodges, American actress
- Jessy Harden (1776–1837), Scottish diarist
- Jessy Hendrikx (born 2002), Dutch professional footballer
- Jessy J (born 1982), American musician in the contemporary jazz music genre
- Jessy Jess (born 1987), Australian mixed martial artist
- Jessy Kramer (born 1990), Dutch team handball player
- Jessy Keeffe (born 1996), Australian rules footballer
- Jessy Kent-Parsons (1882–1966), British welfare activist
- Jessy Lanza (born 1985), Canadian electronic songwriter and producer
- Jessy Gálvez López (born 1995), Belgian professional footballer
- Jessy Miele (born 1985), American female mixed martial artist
- Jessy Matador (born 1982), singer from France
- Jessy Marcelin (born 1934), Chagossian musician and activist
- Jessy Mendiola (born 1992), Filipino actress
- Jessy Moss, singer/rapper
- Jessy Moulin (born 1986), French professional footballer
- Jesy Nelson (born 1991), British singer
- Jessy Pi (born 1993), French professional footballer
- Jessy Rompies (born 1990), Indonesian professional tennis player
- Jessy Reindorf (born 1991), French professional footballer
- Jessy Sahota, Canadian politician
- Jessy Schram (born 1986), American actress
- Jessy Serrata (1953–2017), American Tejano musician and vocalist
- Jessy Singh (born 1993), American cricketer
- Jessy Sorensen (born (born 1989), American professional wrestler
- Jessy Terrero (born 1975), Dominican film and music video director
- Jessy Trémoulière (born 1992), French rugby union player
- Jessy Wilson, American singer

=== Middle name ===
- Annie Jessy Curwen (1845–1932), Irish writer and pianist
- Sally Jessy Raphael (born 1935), American talk show host

== Film ==
- Jessy (movie) or Ye Maaya Chesave, a 2010 Telugu-language romantic movie

== See also ==
- Jess (disambiguation)
- Jesse (disambiguation)
- Jessi (disambiguation)
- Jessie (disambiguation)
- Jeassy (1936–2001)
