= Jessie (surname) =

Jessie is a surname. Notable people with the surname include:

- DeWayne Jessie (born 1951), American actor
- Ron Jessie (1948–2006), American football player
- Tim Jessie (born 1963), American football player

== See also ==
- Jesse (surname)
