= Things Don't Go Smooth =

Source book for Firefly role-playing game

Things Don't Go Smooth is a source book published by Margaret Weis Productions, Ltd in 2014 for the science fiction role-playing game Firefly Role-Playing Game, itself based on the TV series of the same name. The two scenarios detailed in the book utilize the Cortex Plus system.

== Contents ==
Things Don't Go Smooth is a source book of antagonists that the gamemaster can pit against the players.

The first three chapters detail spies and crime bosses, rival gangs and crews and miscellaneous adversaries. New ships are also presented. A special chapter for the gamemaster describes how to play opponents, and Reaver combat management. There are also new rules for scene Triggers, and a random adventure generator.

Two scenarios are included in the book:

- Merciless : The crew is hired to steal a vase from a museum.
- Thieves in Heaven: The crew is caught up in a strange plot while their ship is being repaired in Angel City.

== Reception ==
Thomas Robert, writing for Casus Belli felt that the book's tips about adversaries give them substance and make them memorable, and considered the chapter of advice to be well done.

In The Escapist, Marshall Lemon was not pleased that the original release of the Firefly game did not contain adequate background information, saying, "The bad news is you won’t find much setting information outside of the show itself." He was therefore pleased that much of that information was contained in Things Don't Go Smooth and its sister volume Smuggler's Guide to the Rim.
