= Sophia Seekings Friel =

English doctor and activist

- Born: Sophia Seekings; 3 December 1873; Gloucester, Gloucestershire
- Died: 17 July 1954 (aged 80); Sidmouth, Devon
- Education: M.B., Bac. Surg., M.D. London School of Medicine for Women
- Occupations: Doctor, Maternity and Child Welfare Inspector
- Organization(s): Quakers' Suffrage Society; Federation of Medical Women; Women Sanitary and Health Visitors' Association
- Spouse: Alfred Richard Friel (m. 1918)

Sophia Seekings Friel (3 December 1873 – 17 July 1954) was an English doctor, and maternity & child welfare campaigner, who with Jessy Kent-Parsons pioneered a mother and baby treatment centre in Tottenham, London in 1912, and was one of the first Maternity and Child Welfare Inspectors.

== Life ==
Sophia Seekings was born in Gloucester on 3 December 1873, to Joseph John, an engineer, and Mary Seekings. She was educated at girls' schools in Gloucester, and then at the London School of Medicine for Women, qualifying as a doctor in 1906. She obtained a diploma in public health in 1908.

Once qualified, she worked towards the development of a state medical service, pioneering projects with Tottenham Council, acting as School Medical Officer and Assistant Medical Officer of Health. As School Medical Officer, Seekings was responsible for carrying out inspections of girls and infants, while the Medical Officer of Health examined older boys, under the Education (Administrative Provisions) Act 1907.

In 1911, Seekings became secretary of the newly formed Quakers' Suffrage Society, which sought to tackle women's suffrage 'from the more Quakerly point of view'.

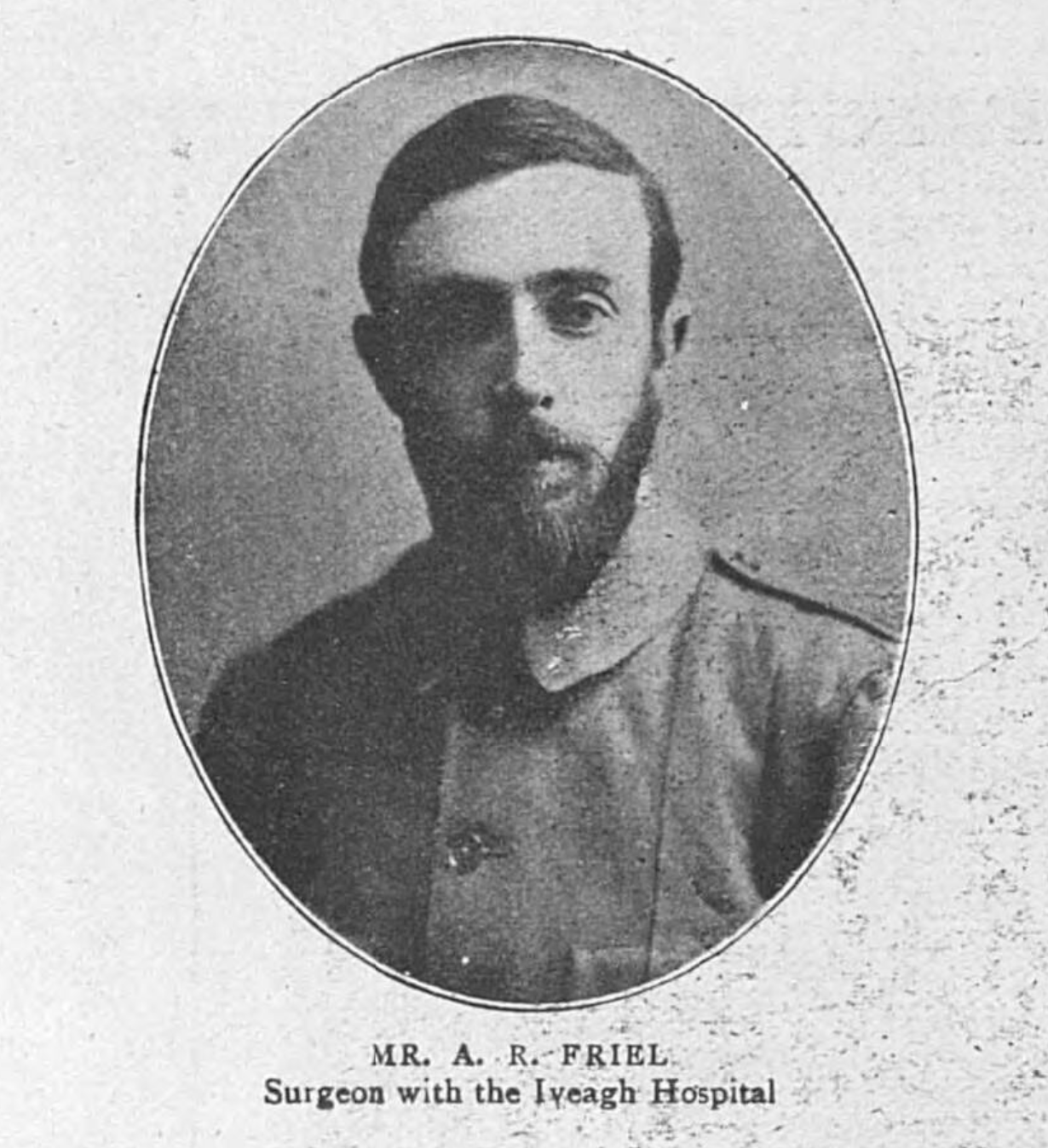
Seekings' husband, Alfred Richard Friel (1870-1958), pictured in The Graphic, 3 March 1900

In the same year, Seekings put forward the idea of a 'school for mothers', and in 1912 she and Jessy Kent-Parsons (1882?- 1966) 'rented a house in an area with the highest infant mortality rate and opened the school'. From this point, while still an Assistant Minister of Health (MOH), the two operated the Tottenham ‘school for mothers’, working to tackle the high rates of infant mortality reported throughout London during the first decade of the 20th century. In 1900, 158 babies out of every 1000 babies born in London died before reaching a year old, and these damning statistics prompted authorities to address the problem. This in turn enabled an increasing number of roles for women in public health, particularly as health visitors and sanitary inspectors. These efforts, including the Tottenham initiative, were impactful, and by 1921 the infant mortality rate was down to 67.9 per 1000.

Seekings was one of the first Maternity and Child Welfare Inspectors, Honorary Secretary of the National Baby Welfare Council, member of the Royal Sanitary Institute, the Federation of Medical Women, and the Health and Cleanliness Council, Vice President of the Women Sanitary Inspectors' & Health Visitors' Association (WSIHVA) 1918–9, and its trustee for over three decades.

In 1918, Seekings married Alfred Richard Friel, also a doctor. In the same year, she published The Baby, second in a series of health manuals published by the Society for Promoting Christian Knowledge.

In 1921, she contributed an article on breast feeding to Maternity and Child Welfare. In Louisa Martindale's The Woman Doctor (1922), she as listed as working as a clinical assistant in the throat, nose, and ear department of the Royal Free Hospital.

Sophia Seekings Friel died in Sidmouth, Devon on 17 July 1954.
