= Jessye =

Jessye is both a given name and a surname. Notable people with the name include:

- Eva Jessye (1895–1992), American conductor
- Jessye Norman (1945–2019), American opera singer
- Jessye Lapenn, a.k.a. Jessica Lapenn, American diplomat

== See also ==
- Jesse (given name)
- Jesse (surname)
