= Jessey =

Jessey is both a surname and given name. It may be a variant of Jesse as a given name. Notable people with the name include:

- Fred Jessey (born 1977), Nigerian freestyle wrestler
- Henry Jessey (1603–1663), English Dissenter
- Jessey Voorn (born 1990), Dutch basketball player
- Jessey Wade (1859 – 1952), English activist

== See also ==
- Jesse
- Jessie
- Jessee
