= Changeling: The Lost =

Tabletop role-playing game

- First edition cover art
- Designers: Ethan Skemp
- Publishers: White Wolf Publishing; Onyx Path Publishing
- Publication: August 16, 2007 (1st edition); January 16, 2019 (2nd edition)
- Genres: Personal horror
- Systems: Storytelling System
- Players: 2+

Changeling: The Lost is the fifth supplementary role-playing game line published by White Wolf Publishing as part of the Chronicles of Darkness setting. It uses the Storytelling System for rules. Changeling is the second limited game published by White Wolf after Promethean: The Created, but in April 2008 it was announced that because of the success of the line it would be an extended limited series not limited to the five books originally planned. Since then, three full hard-cover books were published: Equinox Road, Dancers in the Dusk, and Swords at Dawn. Goblin Markets, available only on PDF, was also created. This was followed by the setting book Victorian Lost.

The game is primarily inspired by tales of changelings from European folklore but includes elements of similar stories from around the world. While superficially similar to the Classic World of Darkness game Changeling: The Dreaming, Changeling: The Lost approaches the legends from a more traditional perspective of mortals kidnapped by Fae and eschews the past life angle that characterized its predecessor.

In 2014, Onyx Path Publishing announced the game's second edition, which released on January 16, 2019.

== Release history ==
The game was released on August 16, 2007, "just in time for Gen Con," according to the White Wolf website. Previous to that, updates on the White Wolf website slowly revealed more about the setting and the mechanics. Much of what was known about the game, prior to the official updates, was disseminated by members who attended the 2007 GAMA Trade Show in Las Vegas.

On April 25, 2007, a White Wolf staff member's publicly posted photograph documenting a prank revealed the Changeling cover for the first time.

On April 30, 2007, the cover for Changeling: The Lost was officially revealed via White Wolf's news feed; coupled with this description of the game line from the publisher:

Taken from your home, transformed by the power of Faerie, kept as the Others’ slave or pet — but you never forgot where you came from. Now you have found your way back through the Thorns, to a home that is no longer yours. You are Lost. Find yourself.

The cover depicts the Changeling title super-imposed over a mass of green thorns; a battered Luna moth is impaled on the thorns.

A "quickstart" version of Changeling: The Lost was released for Free RPG Day, June 23, 2007. This free demo was made available for download from the White Wolf, Inc. website on June 26, 2007.

In 2014, Onyx Path announced that there would be an updated release of Changeling: The Lost, similar to the remakes of their other series. The second edition was released on January 16, 2019.

== Game overview ==
The game is set in the Chronicles of Darkness, a fictional analog to the real world in which human beings unknowingly coexist with legendary monsters and other supernatural phenomena. The "Changelings" of the title are ordinary human beings who were kidnapped by the Fae and taken as slaves to their world (alternately known as Arcadia or Faerie). The player characters are changelings who have managed to escape their otherworldly captors and struggle through the barrier (known as the Hedge or the Thorns) that separates Faerie from Earth. The game focuses on the experiences of these changelings as they re-discover the world of their birth, try to cope with the metamorphoses they have undergone, and seek to evade recapture.

=== Themes ===
The dominant themes of the game are the pain of loss, the quest for identity, and the bittersweet nature of human existence.

Changelings refer to themselves as "the Lost": they were kidnapped by the godlike Fae, taken to an alien realm, and held prisoner. While trapped there (referred to as their "Durance"), they were forced to serve their otherworldly masters and endure inhuman tortures; to survive under the twisted laws underpinning Arcadia, they also had to undergo physical and supernatural metamorphoses. Many escape only to find that they have been replaced by a faerie simulacrum (called a "Fetch") and that they have not been missed at all. Most also discover that time passed differently in Arcadia than in the mortal world, and they are either too old or too young to resume their normal lives. Those who can often attempt to pick up where they left off before they were taken, with varying degrees of success, while others try to build new human lives elsewhere. However even under the best possible circumstances, the Lost are no longer fully human; they have become part of both worlds and while they are still human enough to make sense of human things, they have metamorphosed just enough to skew their perceptions. Many embrace their new existences, compensating for the loss of their mortal lives by immersing themselves in changeling society. Most find that they have come to appreciate humanity in a new way, finding beauty in the most mundane or painful of experiences, aching for things they did not appreciate before their capture.

== Characters ==
Changeling characters are unique individuals, each one shaped differently by his or her personal experiences in the world of the Fae. As a result, Changeling: The Lost features a more nuanced and detailed character-creation system than the other World of Darkness games. Each Changeling possesses a Seeming, and may possess a Kith which further defines a seeming, a Court represented by Seasons or any other patterns, and Entitlements which are used to distinguish and describe the nature of the character according to the metamorphoses that her time with the Fae have wrought upon her. Some Changelings exhibit inhuman beauty, while others exhibit atavism; some are defined by a particular season, while others are defined by their approach to social interaction.

All things fae, including changelings, are also protected by the Mask, an illusion that makes them appear as mundane versions of themselves. Only fae beings can see through the Mask, though they can ensorcell humans and thereby grant them the temporary ability to see through the Mask.

The Seemings are as listed:

- Beasts: Changelings that share qualities with animals both mythical and mundane.
- Darklings: Changelings that represent the aspects of Fear and Shadow.
- Elementals: Changelings that have become one with an aspect of nature.
- Fairests: Changelings that embody the beauty and majesty of the Fae.
- Ogres: Changelings that were subject to violence and became avatars of it.
- Wizened: Changelings that served as workers and servants only to become the figure of their profession.

The Lost have many problems to deal with, the most prominent being the Gentry, or True Fae. Other problems include their fetches, Hobgoblins, Enchanted Mortals, Mad Changelings, and the various other beings within the World of Darkness Cosmology. Not to mention conflicts within the political bodies that make up Changeling society, from debates to full-scale underground wars, between Courts, Freeholds and Entitlements.

== Books ==
=== First Edition ===
Title	Release	Product no.	ISBN	Note(s)
Changeling: The Lost	August 16, 2007	WW70000	ISBN 978-1-58846-527-6	Core rulebook
The Fear Maker's Promise	August 16, 2007	WW70905	—N/a	Adventure for Changeling: The Lost. Published digitally.
Autumn Nightmares	October 5, 2007	WW70300	ISBN 978-1-58846-531-3	Antagonists book
Winter Masques	November 30, 2007	WW70200	ISBN 978-1-58846-532-0	Seemings and kith book
Rites of Spring	February 6, 2008	WW70201	ISBN 978-1-58846-716-4	Contracts and magic book
Lords of Summer	June 11, 2008	WW70202	ISBN 978-1-58846-715-7	Courts and entitlements book
The Equinox Road	August 6, 2008	WW70203	ISBN 978-1-58846-717-1	Advanced guide on playing with themes, moods, epic levels of play and variants
Night Horrors: Grim Fears	October 6, 2008	WW70205	ISBN 978-1-58846-743-0	An antagonist book filled with Fae and Lost for any chronicle and crossover
The Rose-Bride's Plight	October 7, 2007	WW70906	—N/a	Adventure for Changeling: The Lost. Published digitally.
Dancers in the Dusk	April 1, 2009	WW70207	ISBN 978-1-58846-361-6	Sourcebook on dreams and nightmares, the Hedge and the Dusk court
Swords at Dawn	June 24, 2009	WW70208	ISBN 978-1-58846-370-8	An Antagonist book filled with Fae and Lost for any chronicle and crossover
Ready Made Characters: Personae	July 1, 2009	WW70001	—N/a	Characters with art and backgrounds ready to play without preparation
Goblin Markets	September 9, 2009	WW70002	—N/a	Sourcebook about goblins and goblin markets. Published digitally.
Victorian Lost	June 5, 2012	WW70006	—N/a	Sourcebook for running chronicles set in Victorian England

=== Second Edition ===
Title	Release	Product no.	ISBN	Note(s)
The Huntsmen Chronicle Anthology	October 25, 2017		—N/a	Anthology of short stories
Changeling: The Lost Second Edition	January 16, 2019	CTL001	—N/a	Revised core rulebook
Hearts on Trial: Changeling the Lost Second Edition Jumpstart	January 23, 2019		—N/a	Rules digest including ready-made adventure and characters
Oak, Ash, and Thorn: The Changeling: The Lost Second Edition Companion	April 17, 2020		—N/a	Companion book expanding on the second edition
Kith and Kin	November 16, 2022		—N/a	Sourcebook for new kiths and powers, and tools for creating new kiths of one's own
The Hedge	March 13, 2024		—N/a	Sourcebook about the space between the material and faerie worlds

== Reception ==
Changeling: The Lost has been more popular than its predecessor Changeling: The Dreaming, and has won several awards: in 2008, it received the Gold ENnie Awards for Product of the Year, Best Interior Art, Best Production Values, and Best Writing. Additionally, the supplement The Fear Maker's Promise and the demo Changling: The Lost Quickstart won the Silver ENnie Awards for Best Electronic Book and Best Free Product, respectively.

In her book Elves and Fairies, writer Kris Hirschmann praised the darker and creepier tone of Changeling: The Lost compared to Changeling: The Dreaming, saying that it, despite being too sinister for some, made for a fascinating premise that is "seductive in its scariness".

== Reviews ==
- Pyramid
