= Jesse Shanahan =

American disability activist and astrophysicist

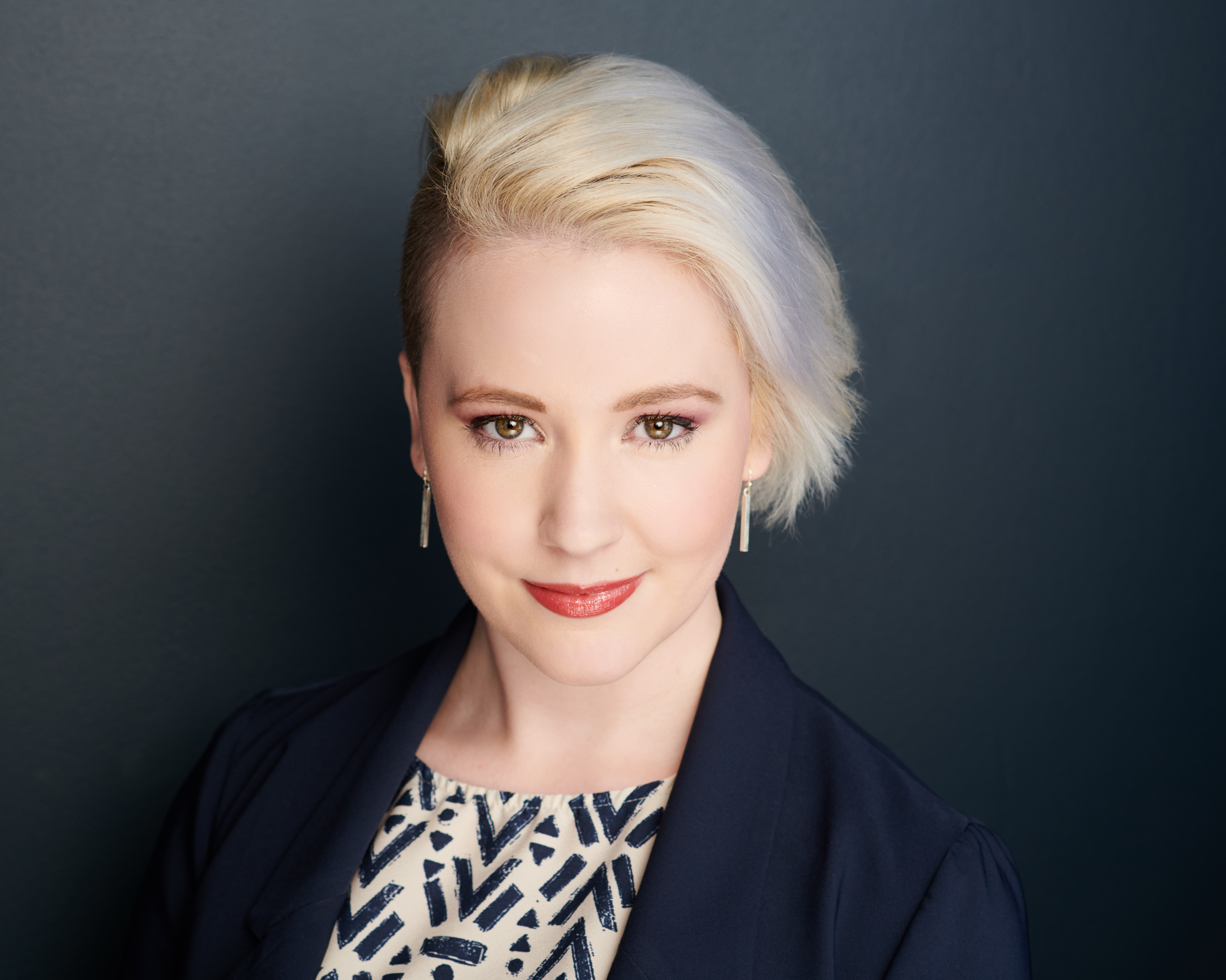
- Education: University of Virginia; Wesleyan University
- Organization: American Astronomical Society
- Known for: disability activism, Ehlers-Danlos Syndrome

Jesse Shanahan is an American disability activist and AI researcher. She co-founded the American Astronomical Society's Working Group on Accessibility and Disability. She is also the chief technology officer of Another Round, an online personal training platform

== Education and research ==
Shanahan was an Echols Scholar at the University of Virginia, where she studied Arabic linguistics and philosophy.

Later in her undergraduate education, she switched to astrophysics and decided to pursue graduate school. She spent two years at Wesleyan University before leaving the program due to her health and ongoing harassment. She conducted research in astrophysics, working with Brooke Simmons at the University of California, San Diego and Chris Lintott of Zooniverse. Her main research focused on the spectroscopic signatures of active galactic nuclei and their host galaxies. Between 2018 and 2021 she worked as a data scientist at Booz Allen Hamilton, specializing in humanitarian applications of artificial intelligence and ethics, and since July 2021 she works as a Machine Learning Developer at Peltarion, where she conducts research on AI ethics and bias in natural language processing.

== Disability ==
Shanahan has Ehlers–Danlos syndrome, a genetic connective tissue disease that causes pain and impacts her ability to move.

She was interviewed by the Science History Institute as part of their oral history project related to disabled scientists.

== Writing ==
Shanahan contributes to Forbes, writing about linguistics and astrophysics, and on her personal Medium page. Her social media posts are sometimes included in articles about disability or ableism. Shanahan created the hashtag "#DisabledAndSTEM" which is used to discuss experiences with disability in science.
