= Jessie L. Simpson =

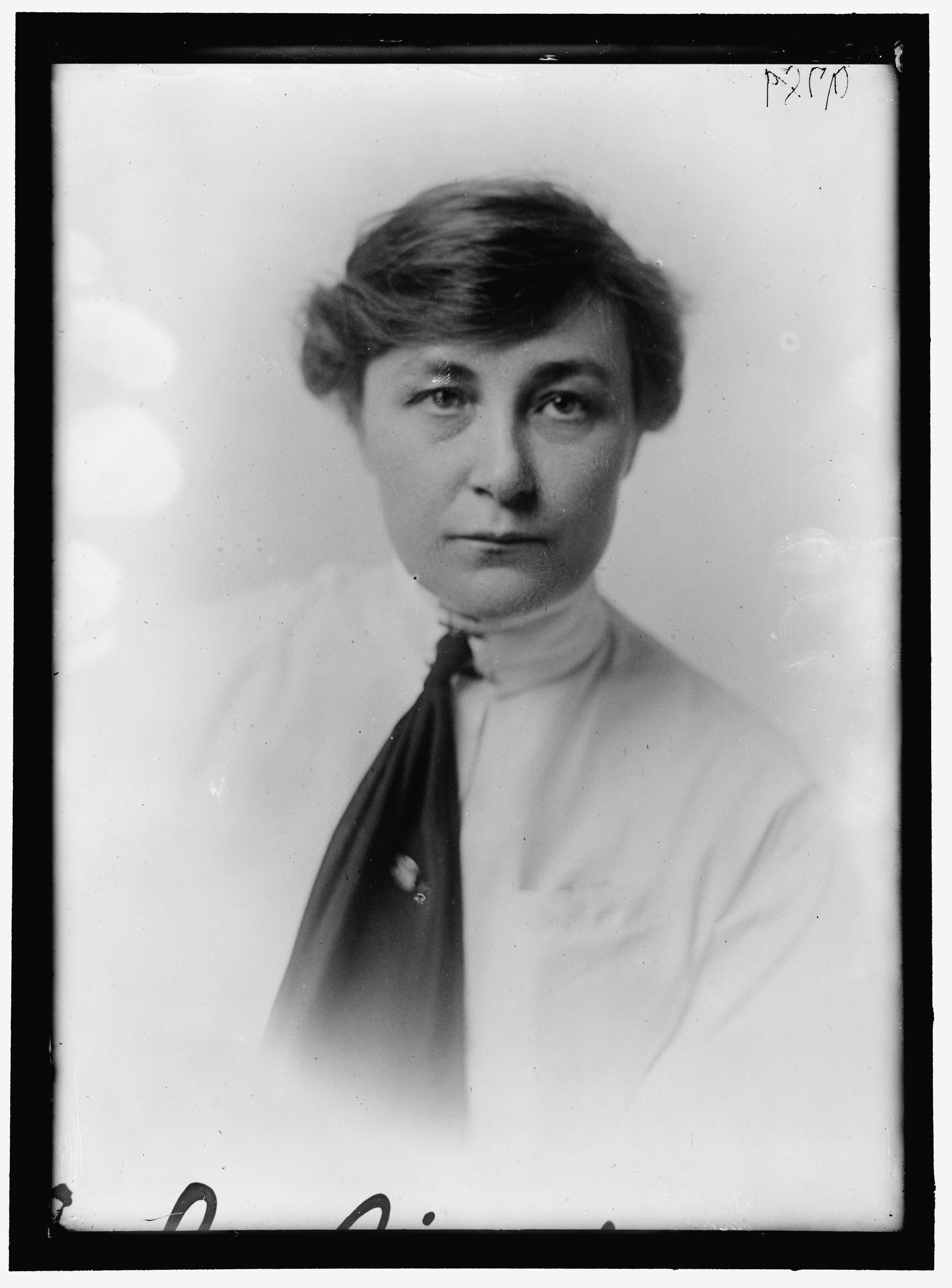
SIMPSON, JESSIE L. LCCN2016868628

Jessie L. Simpson (1882 — April 14, 1974) was a staff member in the United States Senate, appointed clerk of the Committee on Foreign Relations in 1916. At the time, she was the second highest paid woman in the federal government.

== Early life ==
Jessie L. Simpson was born in Illinois and raised in St. Louis, Missouri.

== Career ==
Simpson worked in political campaigns for Jacob F. Wolters in Texas and for Champ Clark in St. Louis. She attended the 1912 Democratic National Convention in Baltimore, Maryland. She helped to run Democratic Western Headquarters in Chicago as secretary to Senator William J. Stone. In 1916, Simpson was appointed as clerk to the Senate Committee on Foreign Relations, becoming the second woman, after Leona Wells in 1901, to serve as secretary of any Senate committee, and thus gain "privileges of the floor". Her salary of $3000 made her the second-highest-paid woman in the federal government, after Julia Lathrop, and the New York Times described her job as "the most responsible of all Senate clerkships."

In late 1917, she joined the auditing office of the American Expeditionary Forces in France during World War I. After the war, she was secretary to Senator Robert A. Taft.

== Personal life ==
Simpson was described as dressing "in the sensible way that all promising young business women are expected to dress. She wears soft silk collars and cravats, and plain tailored suits." Simpson died in 1974, aged 91 years, in a hospital in Holmdel Township, New Jersey.
