= Jess Phillips (disambiguation) =

Jess Phillips (born 1981) is a British politician.

Jess Phillips or Jessica Phillips may also refer to:

- Jess Phillips (American football) (born 1947)
- Jessica Phillips (actress) (born 1971)
- Jessica Phillips (cyclist) (born 1978)

== See also ==
- Jesse Phillips (canoeist) (born 1986)
- Jesse J. Phillips (1837–1901), American judge and soldier
