= Jessie Mackaye =

American actress

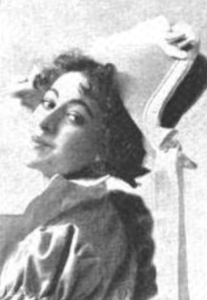
- In The Sketch, 26 July 1899
- Born: November 7, 1879; St. Louis, Missouri
- Died: June 28, 1967 (aged 87); Middletown Township, Pennsylvania
- Occupation: Actress
- Spouse: Robert Frederic Hobbs (m. 1900)

Jessie Mackaye (1879–1967) was an American comic stage actress of the Victorian era.

== Early life ==
Jessie Mackaye was born to an Episcopalian family in St. Louis on November 7, 1879. Prior to becoming an actress, she was educated at the Convent of the Sacred Heart. Mackaye is remembered for her role as Micah Dow in The Little Minister. The play was staged at the Olympia Theatre in New York in September 1897.

== Victorian actress ==
She was in the graduating class of the American Academy of Dramatic Arts in April 1896, held at the Lyceum Theatre on Broadway.

Mackaye began acting with the Amateur Comedy Club in a production of Dandy Dick, which was staged at the Lyceum Theatre in April 1896. She acted the role of "Sheba" at the entertainment venue at Seventh Avenue and 57th Street.

In July 1899, she received positive reviews for her role in DeWolf Hopper's London production of El Capitan, with The Era stating, "Miss Jessie Mackaye won all hearts and made an immediately favourable impression by her dainty prettiness, unflagging activity, and innocent archness in the part of Estrelda." In January 1900, Mackaye again teamed with Hopper in The Mystical Miss (aka The Charlatan) in London.

She married Robert Frederic Hobbs in New York on July 26, 1900, and announced her retirement from acting that November.

In later life, she lived in Darby, Pennsylvania. She died from cardiac arrest at Riddle Memorial Hospital in Middletown Township, Delaware County on June 28, 1967.
