= Jes =

Jes or JES may refer to:

== People ==
- Jes (musician), American singer and songwriter
- Jes Bertelsen, Danish spiritual teacher and author
- Jes Bundsen (1766–1829), Danish painter and etcher
- Jes Gordon (born 1969), American event producer
- Jes Høgh (born 1966), Danish footballer
- Jes Holtsø (born 1956), Danish actor
- Jes Macallan (born 1982), American actress
- Jes Psaila (born 1964), Maltese guitarist
- Jes Staley (born 1956), American banker

== Other uses ==
- Jes Air, a former Bulgarian airline
- The Jes, colloquial name for Coláiste Iognáid, a Jesuit secondary school in Galway, Ireland

== Acronyms ==
- Job Entry Subsystem 1 (JES1), a component of the VS1 operating system
- Job Entry Subsystem 2/3, (JES2, JES3) a component of the MVS operating systems
- Junulara Esperanto-Semajno ("Esperanto Youth Week"), an annual Esperanto youth meeting
- Producciones JES, a Colombian TV production company
- Java Enterprise System, a component of the Sun Java System

== See also ==
- Jess (disambiguation)
