= Jessie Preston =

American silversmith / metalsmith

- Born: Jessie M. Preston; 2 October 1873; Oak Park, Illinois
- Died: 15 March 1962 (aged 88); Baldwinsville, New York
- Occupation: Metalsmith

Jessie M. Preston (1873 - 1962) was an American metalsmith based in Chicago. Her art is characterized by organic and slender shapes in an Art Nouveau style enhanced by features common with the Chicago arts and crafts movement.

== Biography ==
Preston was born in Oak Park, Illinois in 1873. She graduated from the Art Institute of Chicago, having been taught by James Winn among others. After graduation, she opened a business in the Fine Arts Building, where other Chicago artists and art collectives operated, including Kalo Shop and Wilro Shop. Preston also taught metalwork and jewelry around the Midwest, including at the Minneapolis Society of Fine Arts.

In 1918, during World War I, Preston moved to Paris to care for injured soldiers. Following the war, she inventoried cemeteries for the American Red Cross and studied at the Sorbonne. In 1934, Preston returned to the United States, taking a position in the New York Public Library repairing and conserving old and rare books. Preston died in Baldwinsville, New York in 1962.

Preston's work is featured in several museums, including the Art Institute of Chicago, Chazen Museum of Art, and the Museum of the American Arts and Crafts Movement.
