= Jessica Simpson (disambiguation) =

Jessica Simpson (Jessica Ann Johnson, née Simpson, born 1980) is an American singer, actress, and fashion designer.

Jessica or Jess Simpson may also refer to:

- Jess Simpson (footballer) (Jessica Simpson, born 2005), English association footballer
- Jess Simpson (coach) (born 1970), American football coach
- Jessica Yaniv (Jessica Simpson, born 1986 or 1987), Canadian transgender activist
