= Jessi =

Jessi may refer to:

== People ==
- Jessi (musician) (born 1988), Korean-American rapper, singer, and songwriter
- Gianluigi Jessi (1945–2026), Italian basketball player
- Jessi Alexander (born 1976), American country music artist
- Jessi Colter (born 1943), American country music artist
- Jessi Combs (1980–2019), American television personality and metal fabricator
- Jessi Cruickshank (born 1981), Canadian television personality
- Jessi Frey, Finnish singer
- Jessi Klein (born 1975), American comedy writer and stand-up comic
- Jessi Lintl (born 1956), Austrian politician
- Jessi Losada, American sportscaster
- Jessi Miley-Dyer (born 1986), Australian surfer
- Jessi Tati (born 1991), Santomean professional footballer

== Other uses ==
- Jessi (album), 1976, by Jessi Colter

== See also ==
- Jess (disambiguation)
- Jesse (disambiguation)
- Jessy (disambiguation)
- Jessie (disambiguation)
