= Jessie van Aalst =

Dutch softball player

Personal information
- Nationality: Dutch
- Born: 25 May 1992 (age 34) Almere, Netherlands
- Height: 176 cm (5 ft 9 in)
- Weight: 73 kg (161 lb)

Sport
- Sport: Softball
- Club: Olympica Haarlem
Medal record
Women's softball
Representing Netherlands
European Championships
Gold medal – first place	2022 Saint Boi	Team competition

Jessie van Aalst (born 25 May 1992) is a Dutch softball player. She plays with Olympica Haarlem. She is member of the Netherlands women's national softball team since 2012. With the national team she became European champion at the 2022 Women's Softball European Championship.
