= Jesse Donn =

South African retired soccer player

Personal information
- Full name: Jesse Robert Donn
- Date of birth: 9 April 1999 (age 27)
- Position: Midfielder

Senior career*
| Years | Team | Apps | (Gls) |
| 2017–2019 | Ubuntu Cape Town | 39 | (0) |
| 2019–2024 | Supersport United | 59 | (2) |
- * Club domestic league appearances and goals as of 30 September 2024

Jesse Robert Donn (born 9 April 1999) is a South African retired soccer player who last played as a midfielder for SuperSport United in the Premier Soccer League.

Donn started his career with Ubuntu Cape Town, where he progressed through the academy. He was noticed during the 2017–18 Nedbank Cup, and joined SuperSport United in 2019, making his senior debut in early 2020. Favoured by then-manager Kaitano Tembo, Donn showed fine form at the start of the 2021–22 South African Premier Division, and SuperSport's chief executive Stanley Matthews insisted that Donn would not be sold to another South African club.

He was called up to the South Africa national team in November 2021 as a replacement for the injured Yusuf Maart, but did not receive a cap. Donn was later called up to a preliminary squad for the 2023 Africa Cup of Nations qualification opener, but was left out of the squad in May 2022. During the 2022–23 South African Premier Division, he was sparsely used by new SuperSport manager Gavin Hunt, receiving only two league stars and one cup start, prompting other clubs to pursue his signature. Having fallen out of favour at SuperSport United, he was released in the summer of 2024. He did train with TS Galaxy during the summer.

Being a White South African, Donn was interviewed as saying that "I love being the guy that's showing everyone that this space is for everyone, I enjoy having brothers of every race".
