= Jessie Inchauspé =

French biochemist and author

Jessie Inchauspe
- Born: 1992 (age 33–34); Biarritz, Nouvelle-Aquitaine, France
- Education: King's College London (BA); Georgetown University (MA)

Instagram information
- Page: Jessie Inchauspé
- Years active: 2019–present
- Followers: 6,2 million

YouTube information
- Channel: GlucoseRevolution
- Years active: 2022–present
- Subscribers: 1.8 million
- Last updated: 17th April 2026
- Website: glucosegoddess.com

Jessie Inchauspé (born 1992), also known as Glucose Goddess, is a French influencer and New York Times bestselling author. She is the founder of the company Glucose Goddess S.A.S. which is selling nutritional supplements. She is the author of two books on managing glucose levels for wellness: Glucose Revolution and The Glucose Goddess Method. She is a contributor to the French radio station RTL, and presents the 2025 UK Channel 4 show, The Glucose Goddess. Inchauspé lives in New York City.

== Early life and education ==
Inchauspé was born in 1992 in Biarritz, France. An accident in which she broke her back at age 19 led her to being interested in health.

In 2012, she graduated with a bachelor's degree in mathematics from King's College London. She then worked at the University of Pennsylvania. During her time there in 2014, she published A Behaviorally Informed Survey-Powered Market Agent in The Journal of Prediction Markets. In 2015, she completed a master's degree in biochemistry at Georgetown University. While at Georgetown she worked on research linking diet with cancer, and co-authored Paternal programming of breast cancer risk in daughters in a rat model: opposing effects of animal- and plant-based high-fat diets in Breast Cancer Research.

== Career ==
Inchauspé started her career in 2015 working at the genetics start-up 23andMe as product manager.

While working at 23andMe, Inchauspé got the opportunity to test a continuous glucose monitor as part of an internal pilot study. While she does not have diabetes, she describes the experience as "life-changing", and states that her interest in glucose levels arose from linking glucose spikes to mental health episodes of depersonalization-derealization disorder which she says she had suffered from since her accident at 19. The link between glucose and the disorder has never been corroborated in the scientific literature.

Inchauspé then started the @glucosegoddess Instagram account on which she shared graphs made from her own continuous glucose monitor data to illustrate nutritional science. As of 2025, the account holds over 5 million followers.

She describes herself as a "science communicator trying to help people understand how food impacts their body", and that she is trying to "impact public health on a global scale".

Inchauspé has made a number of television appearances, on Good Morning America in the United States, and the French television show Quotidien.

In early 2025, she presented a Channel 4 television series, The Glucose Goddess.

=== Glucose Revolution ===
In April 2022, Inchauspé released her debut book, "Glucose Revolution: the life-changing power of balancing your blood sugar." Over 1 million copies have been sold worldwide. It is a number 1 bestseller in France, the United Kingdom, Australia, Spain, and Germany. In the US, it became a Wall Street Journal bestseller. The book got translated into over 40 languages.

In it, Inchauspé argues for the importance of glucose regulation for all aspects of our health, and defines her "glucose hacks". She claims that glucose management matters for people with and without diabetes alike, and that you can eat everything as long as you understand when, how, and in which combination.

Inchauspé's work centers around ten "glucose hacks" that she claims are groundbreaking, and reduce blood sugar spikes:

- Eat foods in the right order.
- Add a green starter to all your meals.
- Stop counting calories.
- Have a savoury breakfast.
- Have any type of sugar you like – they're all the same.
- Pick dessert over a sweet snack.
- Reach for vinegar before you eat.
- After you eat, move.
- If you have to snack, go savoury, and
- Put some clothes on your carbs.

She claims that these hacks can help improve energy levels, reduce cravings, and that blood sugar balance is the key to physical and mental health.

=== The Glucose Goddess Method ===
In May 2023, Inchauspé's released her second book, "The Glucose Goddess Method: The 4-Week Guide to Cutting Cravings, Getting Your Energy Back, and Feeling Amazing", which focuses on four of her "glucose hacks": have a savoury breakfast, drink vinegar before you eat, add a green starter to all your meals, and after you eat, move.

In it, Inchauspé describes an experiment she ran on 2,500 people who improved all aspects of their health as they added the four hacks to their routines for 4 weeks. The book comes with one hundred recipes to implement the method.

The Glucose Goddess was featured on The New York Times Best Seller List and is an international bestseller.

=== Anti-Spike Formula ===
In 2024, Inchauspé announced the launch of her nutritional supplement, Anti-Spike Formula. She describes the supplement as "the best supplement to support your glucose levels." The supplement is marketed as reducing blood sugar spikes by up to 40%, and as having long-term effects on fasting glucose levels and GLP-1.

A 2-capsule serving includes 250 mg of white mulberry leaf extract as Reducose, 250 mg of Eriomin (a citrus flavonoid lemon extract), 85 mg of cinnamon bark extract at a 12 to 1 extraction ratio, equivalent to 1g of cinnamon, as well as lemon extract and an "antioxidant" vegetable blend.

The product has received criticism owing to the lack of clinical trials investigating the efficacy of the supplements. Evidence for the main ingredient, white mulberry leaf extract, having a beneficial effect on blood glucose levels is limited.

== Reception ==
Australian geneticist David Sinclair, called her book “the best practical guide for managing glucose to maximize health and longevity,” and Dr. Robert Lustig praised her talent for translating complex science into helpful advice.

She has received widespread criticism over the lack of evidence for her products and methods.

In June 2025, the Freedom Food Alliance, supported by more than 40 registered dietitians, nutritionists, and medical professionals, published an open letter to Channel 4 regarding misinformation in the documentary Eat Smart: Secrets of the Glucose Goddess. The letter raised "serious concerns" over the program's scientific accuracy, alleging that it oversimplified medical conditions like acne by suggesting they could be resolved through "glucose hacks." The experts argued that the show misrepresented blood sugar science by encouraging non-diabetic individuals to minimize glucose spikes, noting that variability is a "normal and healthy physiological response" in those without metabolic disorders.

The signatories also warned that the program's emphasis on constant monitoring and dietary "hacks" could fuel orthorexic tendencies and disordered eating patterns. Additionally, the letter highlighted Inchauspé’s lack of professional dietetic or medical credentials as she is not a registered dietician or medical doctor and criticized the marketing of her commercial supplements, asserting that the claims lacked independent scientific validation.

Professor François Jornayvaz, department head at Geneva University Hospitals, stated that in his opinion Inchauspé is doing pseudoscience. After checking the studies she cites in her first book, he found that most were either in-vitro or in-vivo, which couldn't be directly applied to humans. Other studies were found to have methodological flaws or an insufficient number of participants. Inchauspé also applies findings about people with diabetes on healthy people. He concluded that "in principle, her wild theories are based primarily on observations of her own body."

A health watchdog noted that her supplement formula lacks rigorous clinical testing and that claims of a “40% reduction” in glucose spikes are extrapolated only from isolated ingredients. Nutrition experts like Nicola Guess argue that focusing excessively on glucose oversimplifies broader metabolic health and may lead to misinformation.

Nutrition associate professor Laura Bellows cautioned that whilst some of her so-called “glucose hacks” reflect well-established dietary advice (such as having protein and fat with carbs) whilst others, such as claims about the benefits of vinegar, may overstate their effectiveness.

In 2024, France Info, a French national public broadcasting service, published a report scrutinizing Inchauspé's methodology and claims. While acknowledging that reducing sugar intake and avoiding ultra-processed foods are generally accepted dietary recommendations, the experts criticized her use of a small-scale study involving only 11 patients with type 2 diabetes to support her claim that altering the sequence of food consumption can lead to a 75% reduction in blood sugar spikes. The specialists argued that extrapolating such significant conclusions from a limited study population was scientifically unsound.

== Bibliography ==
=== Books ===
- Glucose Revolution: The Life-Changing Power of Balancing Your Blood Sugar. New York: Simon & Schuster (2022). ISBN 1982179414
- Glucose Goddess Method: The Four Week Guide To Cutting Cravings, Getting Your Energy Back, And Feeling Amazing. New York: Simon & Schuster (2023). ISBN 1668024527
