= Jess Lee (Canadian singer) =

- Origin: Canada
- Genres: Country
- Occupation: singer/songwriter
- Years active: 1981–present
- Labels: RCA Records; Musicline Records; 12th St. Records; Mighty Peace Records
- Website: www.jesslee.ca

Jess Lee is a Canadian Métis country music singer-songwriter.

== Career ==
Signed by RCA in 1980 as the lead singer of the Midnite Rodeo Band his work with Rocky Swanson earned him several awards including BCCMA Male Vocalist and Album of the Year honours.

He recorded his first solo album Honky Tonk Love Affair in 1990. This album included 5 Canadian chart hits including the No. 1 hit "Crowhill Road". The title track was featured in the movie Harmony Cats, was voted song of the year by the BCCMA, and garnered Jess Lee the Country Male Vocalist of the Year Award. He then spent several years songwriting in Nashville.

In the mid-1990s Lee returned to his aboriginal musical roots. He signed with 12th Street Records and, together with songwriter Bonnie James, wrote the album Sacred Ground. This recording reflects experiences of the aboriginal and métis peoples of North America and was subsequently nominated for a Juno Award.

In 2004, Lee joined forces with Canadian indie label Mighty Peace Records and released a CD of new original roots music, Born in the North. The album has been credited by Larry Delaney of Country Music News as one of his top ten album picks for 2004. Lee has appeared on numerous award shows and television shows including Native Voices and The Tommy Hunter Show.

In 2011 Lee was inducted into the BCCMA Hall of Fame. Lee's new album Still Standing on Sacred Ground was picked up and re-released and combined with his Sacred Ground album by the Gabriel Dumount Institute, 18 May 2013. The double CD has been renamed I Am All of This. This album has a few remastered songs and some new ones.

== Review highlights ==
- "The best pure country voice in Canada" – Dennis Charney, Country Music News
- "His voice lingers long in your heart long after the music has stopped"- Native Network News
- "A gifted pure country vocalist often compared vocally, and accurately so, to Merle Haggard." -Larry Delaney, Country Music News

== Discography ==
=== Albums ===
Year	Album	Label
1991	Honky Tonk Love Affair	Musicline
1995	Sacred Ground	12th St.
2004	Born in the North	Mighty Peace

=== Singles ===
Year	Single	CAN Country	Album
1990	"Crow Hill Road"	67	Honky Tonk Love Affair
1990	"Couple of Good Ol' Boys" (with Rocky Swanson)	77	Honky Tonk Love Affair

=== Video releases ===
- "Honky Tonk Love Affair" 1991
- "Good Ol’ Boys" 1991
- "Sacred Ground" 1995

== Awards ==
- BCCMA – Album of the Year 1988
- BCCMA – Duo of the Year 1988, 1991
- BCCMA – Male Vocalist of the Year 1981, 1988, 1991
- BCCMA – Songwriter of the Year 1991
- BCCMA – Group of the Year 1981
- CARAS West Coast Music Awards – Country Male Vocalist 1991
- SOCAN – No. 1 Canadian Single (Crowhill Road) 1991
- CARAS Juno Awards- nomination country group of the year 1983, 1985
- CARAS Juno Awards- nomination Best Aboriginal Album 1995
