= Joint Expert Speciation System =

Joint Expert Speciation System (JESS) is a package of computer software and data developed collaboratively at Murdoch University and elsewhere by researchers interested in the chemical thermodynamics of water solutions with important applications in industry, biochemistry, medicine and the environment. Using information from the chemical literature, stored in databases for numerous chemical properties, JESS achieves coherence between frequently conflicting sources by automatic methods.

JESS places a strong emphasis on the concept of chemical speciation (i.e. the identity and relative abundance of different chemical entities which may be present), which can be predicted from known stability constants of metal-ligand complexes. Characteristic quantities for water solutions such as solubilities, equilibrium constants, activity coefficients, heat capacities and densities can be calculated from changes in the chemical speciation.

Recent examples of practical problems that can be investigated by JESS include kidney stones (mineral precipitation and dissolution in the kidney) and Wilson’s disease (copper physiology in the human eye).

At the core of the software package is a thermodynamic database called the ‘JESS Parent Database’ (JPD). JPD now comprises over 80,000 chemical reactions for which some 280,000 equilibrium constants and other thermodynamic parameters have been recorded from the chemical literature. Over 70,000 distinct chemical species are involved. The whole contents of this database in a set of associated PDF documents, which have been specifically prepared for free, widespread scientific dissemination, are available at the Zenodo repository.
