= Jesse Leech Davisson =

American suffragist

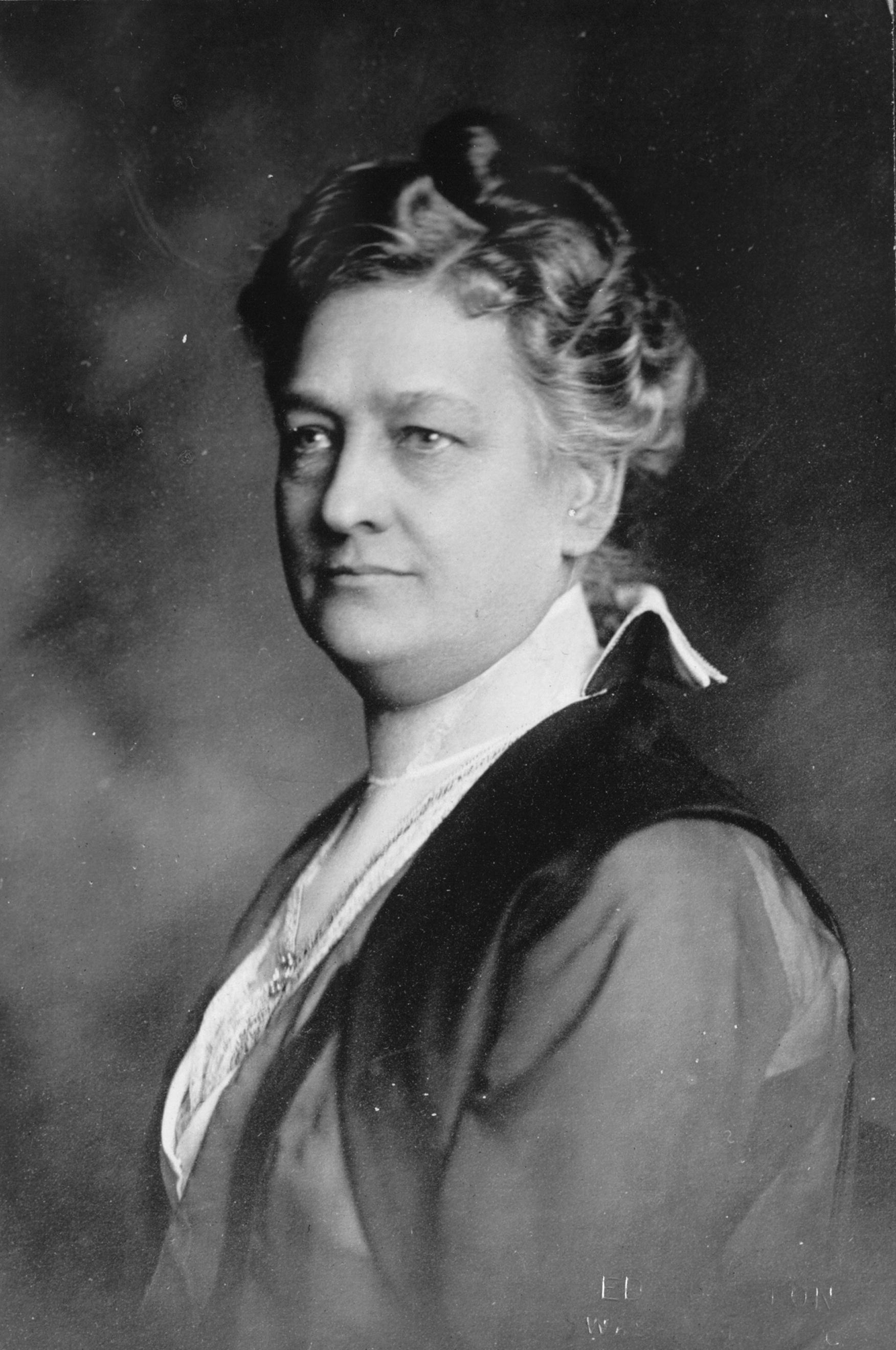
- Born: Jesse Leech; February 5, 1860; Sewickley, Pennsylvania
- Died: June 29, 1940 (aged 79–80)
- Other name: Mrs. Oscar F. Davisson
- Occupation: Suffragist
- Spouse: Oscar F. Davisson (m. 1889; died in 1932)

Jesse Leech Davisson (1860-1940) was an American suffragist active in Ohio. She was a member of the Advisory Council of the Congressional Union for Woman Suffrage.

== Life ==
Davisson née Leech was born on February 5, 1860, in Sewickley, Pennsylvania. In 1899 she married the attorney Oscar F. Davisson (1851-1932) with whom she had three children.

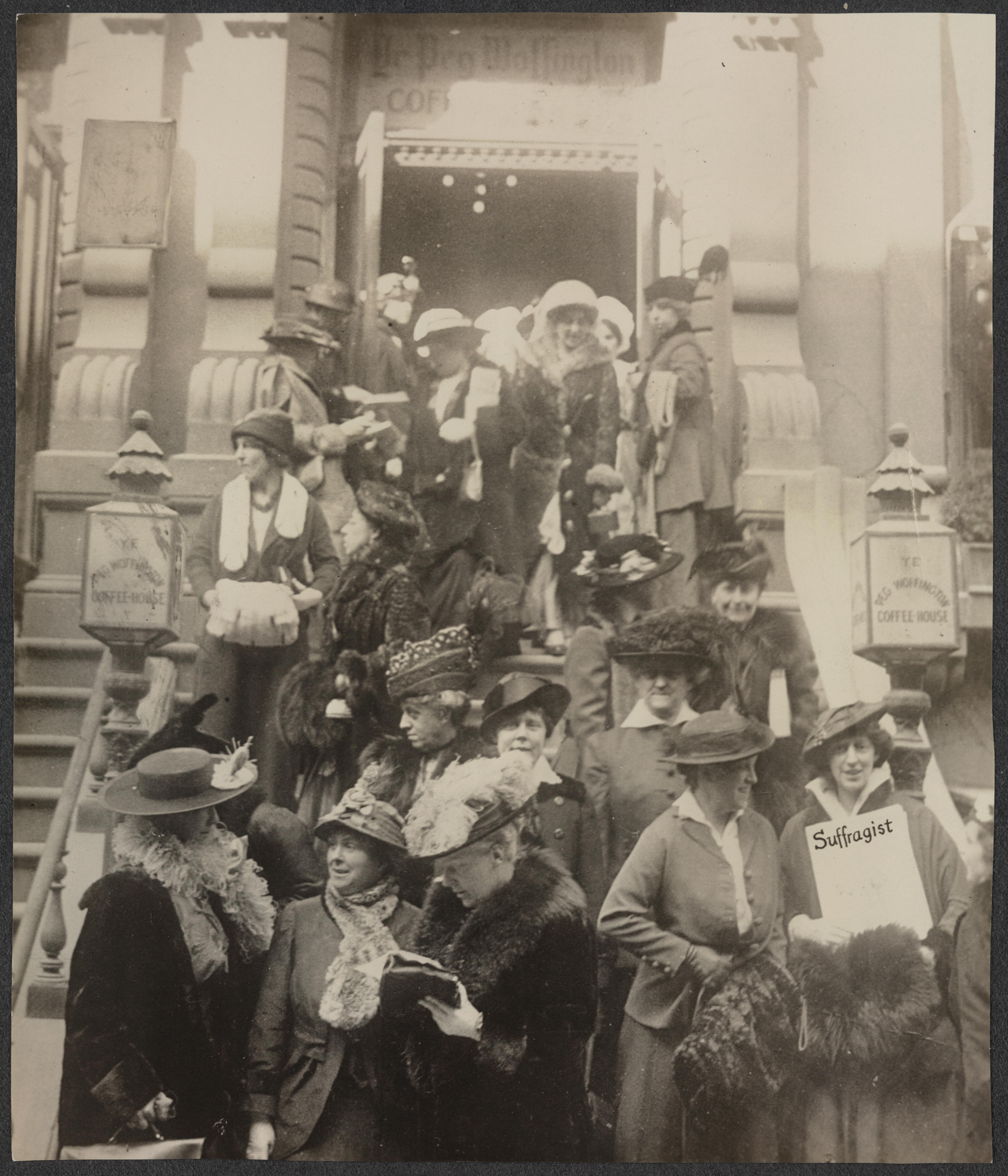
Photograph of Congressional Union for Woman Suffrage Advisory Council leaving the Peg Woffington Coffee House in New York City, March 1915.

In 1896 Davisson joined the Jonathan Dayton chapter of the Daughters of the American Revolution. By 1912 Davisson became involved with advocating for women's suffrage when she campaigned for suffrage for Ohio women. She went on to become president of the Woman Suffrage Party of Montgomery County, Ohio. She also served on the Executive Committee of the Ohio State Woman Suffrage Association, and the Advisory Council of the Congressional Union for Woman Suffrage. In 1914 Davidson helped organize Dayton, Ohio's the first Woman's Suffrage Parade. Her efforts to win women's suffrage on the state level failed, and the women of Ohio did not receive the vote until the passage of the Nineteenth Amendment.

In 1921 Davisson helped found the Dayton and Montgomery County League of Women Voters and served as its first vice president.

Davisson died on June 29, 1940.

== See also ==
- List of suffragists and suffragettes
