= Jess von der Ahe =

Jess von der Ahe (born 1966 in Santa Monica, California) is an American contemporary artist living in New York City.

== Biography ==
Von der Ahe received her BFA from Art Center College of Design in California in 1990 and since then has had 8 solo and 25 group exhibitions in the US and Europe. She is a conceptual artist and her present work continues to deal with the concept of identity and eroticism. She achieved cult status with the radical use of her own DNA in her paintings hermetically sealed in resin. With the current CLONES she explores the concept of the importance of the Muse in art history. Like a DJ she mixes images from today with past iconic images of women and men, reprocessed to become a new hybrid - a bridge between past and present. Through the double shifting gaze of the viewer, classical modern art is reinterpreted for the 21st century.

Works are owned by the Berkeley Art Museum, ERES-Stiftung, Munich and several private collectors, including filmmaker John Waters, Beth Rudin de Woody Beth Rudin DeWoody and Amy Lau. Her work comprises sculpture, oil paintings and drawings. The Münchener Secessio invited her to present her sculptures during the exhibition “Tierisch” the Haus der Kunst. John Waters invited her to participate in his show "Absentee Landlord" at the Walker Art Center, Minneapolis.
