= Hunter: The Vigil =

Tabletop role-playing game

- Cover art for the first edition
- Designers: Justin Achilli (ed. 1); Rich Thomas (ed. 1); Chuck Wendig (ed. 1); Monica Valentinelli (ed. 2)
- Publishers: White Wolf Publishing; Onyx Path Publishing
- Publication: August 14, 2008 (ed. 1); March 2, 2022 (ed. 2)
- Genres: Personal horror
- Systems: Storytelling System
- Series: Chronicles of Darkness
- Website: Official website
- ISBN: 978-1-58846-718-8 (ed. 1)

Hunter: The Vigil is a tabletop role-playing game originally published by White Wolf Publishing on August 14, 2008, and is the sixth game in their game series Chronicles of Darkness – a reboot of the World of Darkness series. Led by a storyteller, (Note: The person leading the game is called the "storyteller" in World of Darkness games, a role called "gamemaster" or "dungeon master" in other role-playing games.) players take the roles of people who have learned of the existence of the supernatural, and fight back against monsters as groups of hunters.

The game was originally designed by Justin Achilli, Rich Thomas, and Chuck Wendig, who based it on the earlier game Hunter: The Reckoning; Monica Valentinelli designed a second edition with updates to the game rules, which was released by Onyx Path Publishing in 2022. Both White Wolf Publishing and Onyx Path Publishing have supported the game with supplementary game books including adventure modules; the latter has also released the Dark Eras line of books describing the setting in other time periods. The game line was commercially successful and well received critically.

== Overview ==
Hunter: The Vigil is a horror tabletop role-playing game with a modern-day setting. Players take the roles of groups of people called hunters, who are aware of the supernatural and fight back against it, but do not necessarily have any special powers, and may not have much knowledge of the monsters they fight. To fight the supernatural, hunters adopt "the vigil", a morality code that gradually erodes their humanity. The monsters the players fight include creatures from other Chronicles of Darkness games, including the protagonists thereof, such as the vampires of the game Vampire: The Requiem or the prometheans of Promethean: The Created. Although the game has a setting with several named organizations and actors, it does unlike the original World of Darkness series not have an ongoing publisher-made narrative.

The game has three types of gameplay: in tier one, the group of hunters – a "cell" – has little support; in tier two, the hunters have the support of a larger organization called a compact; and in tier three, they are at the mercy of large groups called conspiracies, which may control governments. The tier affects the hunters' abilities; additionally, lower tiers give the hunters more freedom whereas higher tiers give access to more resources. Players create their characters in a similar way to other Chronicles of Darkness games, assigning values to different attributes, represented by the filling in of dots on a character sheet. One of these is the willpower attribute, which reflects the hunters' moral conflicts, and can be spent to resist social pressure. Games are led by a storyteller, and outcomes of attempted actions are determined based on characters' statistics and the rolling of dice pools.

== Production ==
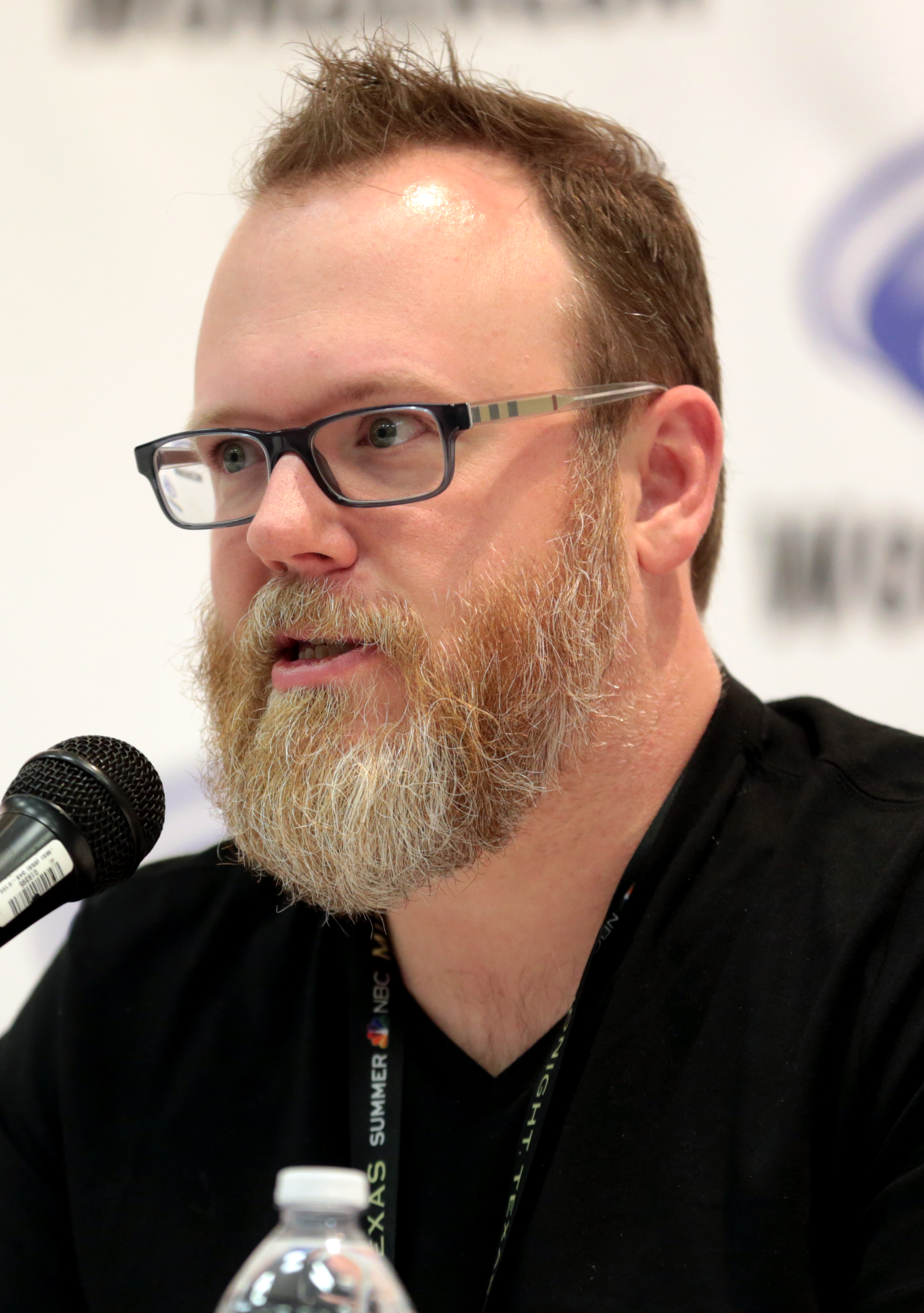
Chuck Wendig (pictured) developed the game, and designed it together with Justin Achilli and Rich Thomas.

Hunter: The Vigil was originally produced by White Wolf Publishing as the sixth game in the Chronicles of Darkness series, which is a reboot of their series World of Darkness. Like many games in the series, it is based on an earlier World of Darkness game – Hunter: The Reckoning (1999) – but it also expands on the basic human characters described in the Chronicles of Darkness rulebook, and takes inspiration from Dark Ages: Inquisitor (2002) and The Hunters Hunted (1992). The first edition of Hunter: The Vigil was developed by Chuck Wendig; although he had written many books for White Wolf Publishing, it was only his second time developing one, which he considered the most difficult aspect of the project for him. He designed it together with Justin Achilli and Rich Thomas; Monica Valentinelli was the lead designer for the second edition.

Wendig described the game's main theme as "light in shadows", with hunter characters fighting against the supernatural as underdogs; a secondary theme to him was the simultaneous fragility and power of humanity, and how the pressure of necessary sacrifices affects the hunters. Valentinelli did not want to drastically change the game for its second edition, but to improve on and clarify the core, including updating the game rules to bring them in line with the other second-edition Chronicles of Darkness games. She also wanted to work with writers of many different backgrounds due to the game's global scope.

=== Release ===
White Wolf Publishing announced Hunter: The Vigil in January 2008, and released the first edition on August 14, 2008, at the Gen Con game convention. In the following years, they supported the game with supplementary game books, including several adventure modules. Many of these were created as part of White Wolf Publishing's SAS line ("Storytelling Adventure System") of ebooks, and only released digitally, but the game line has also seen several print releases. The second edition was announced in 2015 by Onyx Path Publishing, a company formed by ex–White Wolf Publishing staff. It was financed through a crowdfunding campaign on Kickstarter, and was released on March 2, 2022.

In addition to the game and the supplementary books, Onyx Path Publishing has released a line of Dark Eras books, which describe the setting of Hunter: The Vigil and other Chronicles of Darkness games during other time periods.

== Books ==
=== First edition (2008–2017) ===
Game books for Hunter: The Vigil's first edition
Title	Original release	ISBN	Publisher	Notes
Hunter: The Vigil	August 14, 2008	978-1-58846-718-8	White Wolf Publishing	Core rulebook for the game's first edition
Witch Finders	September 2008	978-1-58846-722-5	White Wolf Publishing	Sourcebook for mages
Bad Night at Blackmoon Farm	October 7, 2008	—N/a	White Wolf Publishing	Adventure about the investigation of an incident at Blackmoon Farm. Only released digitally.
Spearfinger	January 21, 2009	—N/a	White Wolf Publishing	Adventure about the investigation of an organ harvester. Only released digitally.
Murder Will Out	January 28, 2009	—N/a	White Wolf Publishing	Adventure about the investigation of a group of killers. Only released digitally.
Horror Recognition Guide	February 19, 2009	978-1-58846-355-5	White Wolf Publishing	Sourcebook containing files for a hunter cell in Philadelphia
Under the Skin	February 2009	—N/a	White Wolf Publishing	Adventure about the investigation of a spirit possession. Only released digitally.
Night Stalkers	March 2009	978-1-58846-745-4	White Wolf Publishing	Sourcebook for vampires
Spirit Slayers	April 2009	978-1-58846-746-1	White Wolf Publishing	Sourcebook for shapeshifters, including werewolves and ghosts
Blood Drive	May 2009	—N/a	White Wolf Publishing	Adventures about the transport of a vampire from Philadelphia to Chicago. Only released digitally.
The Keepers	2009	—N/a	White Wolf Publishing	Sourcebook containing playable characters. Only released digitally.
Collection of Horrors	April 2010	—N/a	White Wolf Publishing	Collection of sixteen guides also released individually. Only released digitally.
Compacts & Conspiracies	May 2010	978-1-58846-538-2	White Wolf Publishing	Sourcebook describing the secrets of the various hunter organizations
Block by Bloody Block	March 2011	978-1-58846-533-7	White Wolf Publishing	Guide to sandbox-style campaigns based around exploration, conquest and defense of a territory
Mortal Remains	April 30, 2014	—N/a	Onyx Path Publishing	Sourcebook for changelings, demons, mummies, prometheans, and sin-eaters
Tooth and Nail	March 29, 2017	—N/a	Onyx Path Publishing	Sourcebook for primordial beasts

=== Second edition (2022–present) ===
Game books for Hunter: The Vigil's second edition
Title	Original release	ISBN	Publisher	Notes
Hunter: The Vigil	March 2, 2022	—N/a	Onyx Path Publishing	Core rulebook for the game's second edition
Tending the Flame	July 12, 2023	—N/a	Onyx Path Publishing	Expansion of the core rulebook, with further mechanics, compacts, and conspiracies
Killing Time	December 20, 2023	—N/a	Onyx Path Publishing	Introduction to the game, with an adventure, brief rules, and pre-made characters

== Reception ==
Reception
Review scores
Source	Rating
Fenix	14/20 (ed. 1)
Flames Rising	(ed. 1)

Hunter: The Vigil performed better commercially than expected, leading to the initially limited game line getting expanded with further supplementary books, and more of those getting released as printed books. The second edition was also commercially successful, quickly exceeding its crowdfunding goal. The game has also been generally well received critically, with Flames Rising considering the first edition a stand-out among the publisher's games around that time.

Critics liked the gameplay and the ease and speed of creating characters; Fenix found the dot-based attribute system superior to and easier to read than other role-playing games that use number-based systems, and appreciated the willpower rules for encouraging players to take risks for potential rewards. Flames Rising found the tactics rules too complex for a game intended to focus on storytelling, but thought that the game overall worked well both for one-shots and longer campaigns.

The writing saw mixed opinions: Fenix liked the game's "dark and mature" tone, but criticized its portrayal of women, describing it as adhering too strictly to gender roles and mostly portraying women as victims, exemplifying this with how only one of the game's twelve compacts and conspiracies is visually represented by a female character, who they found under-dressed for a hunter. Both Fenix and Flames Rising additionally criticized the writing for at times being choppy; Fenix called it sometimes "pompous" and tedious, something they found unusual for White Wolf Publishing's games. The game's visuals also saw varying responses: Fenix found the quality to be uneven throughout the book, whereas Rue Morgue found the artwork "excellent", and Flames Rising considered the book almost entirely graphically pleasing, with the cover art being one exception.

Other reviews:

- Rebel Times #12
