= The Black Ghosts (short story) =

1740 short story by Pu Songling

- Short story by Pu Songling
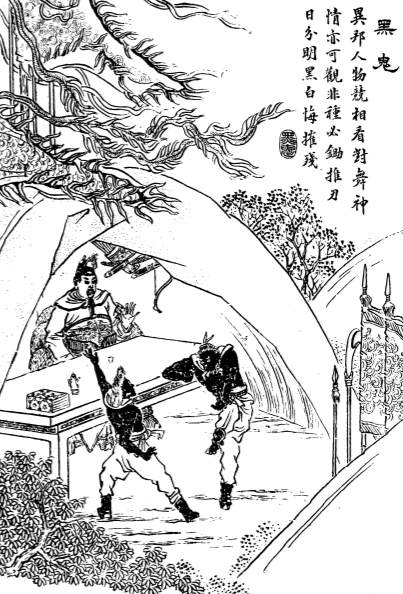
- 19th-century illustration from Xiangzhu liaozhai zhiyi tuyong (Liaozhai Zhiyi with commentary and illustrations; 1886)
- Original title: 黑鬼 (Heigui)
- Translator: Sidney L. Sondergard
- Country: China
- Language: Chinese
- Genre: Chuanqi

Publication
- Published in: Strange Stories from a Chinese Studio
- Publication type: Anthology
- Publication date: c. 1740
- Published in English: 2014

"The Black Ghosts" (Chinese: 黑鬼; pinyin: Hēiguǐ) is a short story written by Chinese author Pu Songling collected in Strange Tales from a Chinese Studio (Liaozhai; 1740). It concerns a Chinese official who purchases a pair of "black ghosts" (a pejorative for African slaves), and details how they are exploited. The story was fully translated into English by Sidney L. Sondergard in 2014.

== Plot ==
Li Zongzhen (李总镇), a government official stationed in Jiaozhou (now Jiao county in Shandong), purchases two African slaves, described as "black ghosts" who can step on sharp daggers unscathed, owing to their wiry feet. They father children with Chinese prostitutes but, upon realising that their skin is not dark, they kill them; after the act, however, they regretfully realise that their children's bones were actually black. Li also frequently commands them to perform for him, and "the sight was really something impressive".

== Background ==
The theme of the story is slavery, which during Pu's time was legal in China. The original title, "Heigui" (黑鬼 (Note: Translated literally by Sidney L. Sondergard as "The Black Ghosts"; Liana Chen explicitly renders it as "The Negroes", conveying its connoted meaning.)), in and of itself refers to Africans in a pejorative fashion; Pu wishes to highlight the brutality of the slave trade, and the harsh and unjust treatment received by the slaves. According to Zhang Yongcheng in his 1997 Comparative study of Eastern and Western writers (东西方跨世紀作家比较研究), the fact that black slaves were already being sold in Qing dynasty China is an oft-overlooked fact, and Pu's story is one of the few works that discuss the topic. Similar to other Liaozhai tales including "The Foreigners" and "The Raksha Country and the Sea Market", Pu Songling also delves into the taboo and the unconventional, choosing to revolve his story around a foreign topic.
