= Jessy Kent-Parsons =

British welfare activist

Jessy Kent-Parsons (née Usher; 1882 – 26 February 1966) was a mother and child welfare campaigner, who established a School for Mothers in Tottenham in 1912, and organised one of the first antenatal clinics in England in 1917.

== Life ==
Jessy Eugenie Usher was born in Aston, Birmingham in 1882, the daughter of John Usher, a coach painter. A talented contralto, she went to the Royal College of Music at 17, and made some appearances prior to her marriage, in 1900, to Edward Kent-Parsons, a commission agent. The couple had one daughter, but Edward Kent-Parsons died in 1908, from which point she turned to social work.

Kent-Parsons gained a certificate from the Sanitary Inspectors' Board, as well as the Central Midwives' Board, and obtained a Ministry of Health Visitor's Diploma. Qualifying as a Woman Sanitary Inspector in 1911, Kent-Parsons gained employment with the London Borough of Tottenham as a Health Visitor, remaining so until 1945. She was an early member of the Health Visitors' Association, with which she was actively involved, and twice acted as chairperson.

Kent-Parsons became particularly concerned with the health and welfare of women and children, joining the WPHOA in 1912. In the same year, alongside Dr Sophia Seekings Friel, she established a School for Mothers in St. Anne's Ward, Tottenham, an area with a high rate of infant mortality. She then joined the voluntary committee of the first creche to be opened in Tottenham, which became an influential example for the founding of the Maternity and Child Welfare Department of the BC. Of this, she acted as superintendent for three decades, from 1915 to 1945. In 1917, Kent-Parsons organised one of the country's first antenatal clinics, and in 1921 was part of a BMA Committee on Infant Mortality.

In addition to her employment, Kent-Parsons was active in efforts to achieve higher salaries for health visitors. She was also prominent on a number of boards and committees, including on the Executive Committee of the Women Sanitary Inspectors and Health Visitors' Association (WSIHVA) 1918-9; as representative of the Women Sanitary Inspectors on the National Council of Women until 1922; as chair of the Midwifery Training Sub-Committee in 1928, and as a representative of the NCUMC 1926-8. Additionally, she was a member of the National Council of Mother and Child Welfare, the National Association for the Prevention of Infant Mortality, the National Baby Welfare Council, Standing Joint Committee of Industrial Women's Organisations, the National Council of Women, the Women's Advisory Housing Council, and the National and Local Government Officers' Association. For this latter, she travelled abroad as part of educational efforts. In 1935, she was appointed MBE.

Kent-Parsons retired in 1945, after 34 years with Tottenham Borough Council. and was commended for her 'valuable services' and 'unrelenting and determined spirit', particularly in her work throughout World War II. She spent her retirement in Torquay, Devon, living with her friend, Miss Blanchard.

Jessy Kent-Parsons died in a Torquay nursing home on 26 February 1966, remembered for her 'zeal... abundant vitality and great sense of humour'.
