= Jennifer Rodgers =

American attorney and legal analyst

- Born: Jennifer Gillum; 1970 or 1971 (age 55–56)
- Education: University of California, Los Angeles (BA); University of California, Berkeley (JD)

Jennifer Gillum Rodgers (born 1970/1971) is an American attorney and legal analyst at CNN.

== Biography ==
Rodgers was born Jennifer Gillum, the daughter of Sharon and Edward R. Gillum, and raised in metropolitan Sacramento. Her father was a civil engineer and her mother a high school teacher. Rodgers graduated with a B.A. from the University of California, Los Angeles and a J.D from University of California, Berkeley School of Law. She clerked for United States District Judge Stanley A. Weigel in the Northern District of California and then worked as an associate in the litigation department of Cravath, Swaine & Moore. In 2000, she joined the United States Attorney's Office in the Southern District of New York where she served as Deputy Chief and Chief of the Organized Crime Unit; and as Deputy Chief and Chief of the General Crimes Unit. In 2012, she was named by United States Attorney for the Southern District of New York, Preet Bharara, as Deputy Chief of the Appeals Unit. She served as the executive director for the Advancement of Public Integrity at Columbia University until 2018. She is currently a lecturer at the Columbia Law School and serves on its advisory board and as a legal analyst for CNN.

Rodgers signed a letter saying that President Donald Trump would be charged with obstruction of justice if he were not in office.

== Politics ==
In 2020, Rodgers endorsed Alvin Bragg for district attorney of Manhattan and was featured on Bragg's campaign website. She specifically raised his internal ethical policies, stating that there is "very little external oversight of district attorneys."
