= Lake Jessie (North Dakota) =

Lake in the state of North Dakota, United States

- Location within North Dakota
- Location: Griggs County, North Dakota
- Coordinates: 47°33′03″N 98°17′18″W
- Type: Lake
- Max. length: 1.5 miles (2.4 km)
- Max. width: 1 mile (1.6 km)
- Surface area: 473.6 acres (191.7 ha)
- Shore length^{1}: 3.7 miles (6.0 km)
- Surface elevation: 1,440 feet (440 m)
- ^{1} Shore length is not a well-defined measure.

Lake Jessie is a body of water located two miles east of Binford in Griggs County, in the U.S. state of North Dakota. The lake has a surface area of 474 acres (192 ha). It is bordered by the Lake Jessie State Historic Site. John C. Frémont named Lake Jessie for his future wife, Jessie Benton Frémont.
