= Jesse McDonald (archer) =

Australian archer

Personal information
- Nationality: Australian
- Born: August 1988 (age 36); Brisbane, Queensland

Sport
- Country: Australia
- Sport: Archery
- Event: Men's recurve

Jesse McDonald (born August 1988) is an Australian archer, who was named to the 2012 Australian archery shadow Olympic squad.

== Personal ==
McDonald was born in August 1988 in Brisbane, Queensland. He does carpentry. In 2003, he won the inaugural North-West News YoungStar sports award.

== Archery ==
McDonald is an Australian archer who has trained at the Australian Institute of Sport since 2003 after beating 36 other aspiring archers to earn a scholarship. One of his archery related goals is to win an Olympic medal. In national competitions, he has represented the Australian Capital Territory and South Queensland Archery Society (SQAS).

In 2003, he trained for the 2004 Junior World Championships in England. In 2004, he was a member of Mount Petrie Archery in the Belmont area. He participated in the 2004 Australian National Junior Championships. At the 2006 Junior National Championships shooting for SQAS, McDonald finished first in the Junior Boys Recurve Freestyle event with a score of 2384. In match play, he started off ranked eighth. He competed in the Italian Grand Prix. In 2010, he finished third at the Australian archery championships with a total of 2528 points. In May 2011, he was ranked seventh nationally in the men's recurve. In September 2011, he was named to the Australian archery shadow Olympic squad, from which the selectors choose the Olympic team. At the September 2011 Australian Olympic Test event, he was ranked sixth with a score of 1311. He attended national team training camps in Canberra in September 2011 and March 2012. He was dropped from the shadow squad after the 2012 National Championships.
