= Jesse (surname) =

Jesse is a surname. Notable people with the surname include:

- Eckhard Jesse (born 1948), German political scientist
- Edward Jesse (1780–1868), English writer on natural history
- John Heneage Jesse (1809–1874), English historian
- John John Jesse (born 1969), American painter
- Richard Henry Jesse (1853–1921), American educator, president of the University of Missouri
- F. Tennyson Jesse (1888–1958), English criminologist, journalist and author

== See also ==
- Jessye, given name and surname
