= Smuggler's Guide to the Rim =

Role-playing game supplement

Smuggler's Guide to the Rim is a sourcebook published by Margaret Weis Productions, Ltd in 2015 as a supplement for the Firefly Role-Playing Game, which itself is based on the Firefly TV series.

== Description ==
Smuggler's Guide to the Rim presents more information about the Firefly role-playing game setting, including:

- the Blue Sun and Kalidasa systems: Planetary descriptions in gazetteer format, secret trade routes, and places for player characters to hide out
- Various Chinese phrases and their translations
- New game rules for character reputation
- Twelve new character archetypes
- New ship designs

The book also includes two adventures: "All in the Family" by Margaret Weis, and "Circling the Wagons" by Greg Stolze.

== Publication history ==
In 2005, Margaret Weis Productions acquired the role-playing game license for Serenity, the movie based on the Firefly TV series, and subsequently produced the Serenity Role Playing Game that used the first iteration of the Cortex System rules. That license expired in 2011, and production of the Serenity role-playing game ended. In 2013, the company announced that they now had a license to produce a game based on the Firefly TV series, this time with the rights to the characters who appeared in the series rather than those who appeared in the film. After the release of preview adventures Gamin' in the Verse and Freedom Flyer in 2013, the Firefly Role-Playing Game was released in 2014. This was followed by a series of sourcebooks and adventures. The fourth of these was Smuggler's Guide to the Rim, a 296-page PDF and soft-cover book designed by Bill Bodden, Jaym Gates, Deanna Gilbert, Travis Heermann, Aaron S. Rosenberg, Brie Sheldon, Greg Stolze, PK Sullivan, Monica Valentinelli, Eddy Webb, and Margaret Weis, with artwork by Joseph Carriker, Thomas Deeny, Brian Glass, Craig S. Grant, Yigit Koroglu, Ben Mund, Beth Sobel, Andrew Trabbold, Kieran Yanner, and Darius Zablockis. It was published in 2015.

== Reception ==
Writing for Escapist Magazine, Marshall Lemon noted that "Smuggler’s Guide to the Rim has a fantastic Reputation system for managing factions, and an upgraded character sheet with an 'episode guide' that tracks experience." While Lemon agreed that the core game was playable without these additions, he concluded, "they add so much that Firefly feels lacking without them."

Thomas Robert for Casus Belli said that the basic faction and reputation management system in the book would be an excuse to add more dice to the GM or crew pools.
