= Monica Valentinelli =

Italian-American game designer

- Born: Monica Valentinelli
- Occupation: Freelance writer
- Writing career
- Genres: Fantasy, role-playing game, horror, science fiction
- Website: www.booksofm.com

Monica Valentinelli is an Italian-American game designer, author, essayist, editor, and game developer. She studied at University of Wisconsin–Madison, and holds a B.A. in English with a Creative Writing Emphasis. She started working in the hobby games industry in 2005. She is the author of several roleplaying games and supplements, as well as short stories and essays, and is an anthologist as well. Since 2016 she has been an industry speaker and Guest of Honor at several game conventions.

== Career ==
Monica Valentinelli contributed to All Flesh Must Be Eaten and the Ninja Burger RPG, and also served as Marketing Director for Steve Jackson Games. She rose to prominence as a game designer when Margaret Weis Productions hired her as lead writer and line manager of the Firefly RPG, which was released in 2014. After leaving MWP, Valentinelli was announced by Onyx Path Publishing as the lead designer for the second edition of Hunter: the Vigil.

Aside from her contributions to roleplaying games, Valentinelli co-edited the anthology, Upside Down: Inverted Tropes in Storytelling with Jaym Gates. Publishers Weekly described this book as "both enjoyable to read and an incisive work of commentary on the genre" of speculative fiction. Charles de Lint wrote that he loved the anthology, Upside Down. Valentinelli has also authored reference works in the Firefly franchise for Titan Books, including the Firefly Encyclopedia and Firefly: The Gorramn Shiniest Language Guide and Dictionary in the 'Verse.

Valentinelli was one of the selected Industry Insider speakers for Gen Con 2016, the first time that the convention had majority of women speakers, and she detailed on her blog how critics falsely described the list of speakers as being composed of indie gaming people, which she felt indicated it was "meant as a slight as it is inconsequential to the opiners. Much like small press or self-published to some, in fiction." She cancelled her Guest of Honor invitation to OdysseyCon in 2017, citing a previous experience of sexual harassment by OdysseyCon volunteer Jim Frenkel, leading to a discussion of sexual harassment at gaming conventions and more generally in the RPG industry. In 2017 she was Guest of Honor at Ropecon in Finland.

== Bibliography ==
=== Short fiction ===
2015

- “Furies (Three of a Kind).” Gods, Memes, and Monsters, Stone Skin Press, 2015.

2012

- “Bored to Fu.” The Lion and the Aardvark, Stone Skin Press, 2012.
- “Fangs and Formaldehyde,” New Hero Volume 1, an anthology from Stone Skin Press, 2012.
- “Tomorrow’s Precious Lambs.” Extreme Zombies, Prime Books, 2012. (Reprint)

2011

- “Tailfeather”, Apexology: Science Fiction and Fantasy, Apex Publications, 2011. (Out Of Print)

2010

- "The Queen Of Crows." e-book, FR Press, 2010.

=== Novellas ===
- Redwing's Gambit. for the Bulldogs! RPG, Galileo Games, 2012.

=== Reference Works ===
- Firefly Encyclopedia. Titan Publishing, 2018.
- Wonderbook (Revised and Expanded): The Illustrated Guide to Creating Imaginative Fiction. Edited by Jeff VanderMeer, Harry N. Abrams, 2018. (Contributor)
- Firefly: The Gorramn Shiniest Language Guide and Dictionary in the 'Verse. Titan Publishing, 2016.

=== Roleplaying Games ===
- Hunter: The Vigil Second Edition, Chronicles of Darkness, Onyx Path Publishing/Paradox Interactive, 2022. (Developer)
- Unknown Armies 3rd Edition Books 1, 2, & 3, Atlas Games, 2017.
- Robert E. Howard’s Conan RPG, Modiphius, 2016.
- Firefly Role-Playing Game Corebook, Margaret Weis Productions, 2014.
- Exquisite Replicas, Abstract Nova Entertainment, August 2008.
- Aletheia, Abstract Nova Entertainment, 2007.
- Noumenon, Abstract Nova Entertainment, 2006.
- Ninja Burger 2nd Edition, Aethereal Forge, 2006. (Editor)
