= Jess (disambiguation) =

Jess is a given name and a surname. It may also refer to:

- Jess (falconry), the strap that tethers a hawk or falcon
- Jess (programming language)
- Jess (novel), by H. Rider Haggard
- Jess (album), a 2024 album by Jess Glynne
- Joint Expert Speciation System, chemistry software

== See also ==
- Jes (disambiguation)
