= Test of the Twins =

Book by Margaret Weis and Tracy Hickman

- Cover of the first edition.
- Authors: Margaret Weis; Tracy Hickman
- Illustrator: Valerie Valusek
- Cover artist: Larry Elmore; Matt Stawicki
- Language: English
- Series: Dragonlance Legends
- Genre: Fantasy literature
- Publisher: Wizards of the Coast
- Publication date: August 1986
- Publication place: United States
- Media type: Print (hardcover, paperback)
- Pages: 330
- ISBN: 0-88038-267-8
- OCLC: 14442722
- Preceded by: War of the Twins

Test of the Twins is a 1986 fantasy novel by American writers Margaret Weis and Tracy Hickman. It is the third and final book in the Dragonlance Legends, which along with the Dragonlance Chronicles are considered the core Dragonlance novels. The novel appeared on The New York Times best seller list.

Test of the Twins is also the name of a short story from 1984, the very first Dragonlance tale; it was reprinted in the 1987 collection The Magic of Krynn.

== Plot summary ==
This novel begins where the last one left off; Caramon Majere and Tasslehoff Burrfoot are in a bleak gray world and Raistlin Majere is with Crysania in the Abyss.

The novel begins with a short prologue that relates the short ride of Kharas, a dwarven hero who is riding away from a battle. Kharas hears a massive explosion that is a fortress exploding due to magical forces mixing together when Raistlin enters the Abyss and Caramon and Tas go forward in time. Caramon and Tas arrive two years ahead of when they planned to, and discover that an hourglass constellation (hourglass being the symbol of Raistlin) dominates the sky, having defeated Paladine, Patriarch of the Gods and Takhisis, Queen of Darkness. The world is devoid of life, nothing more than gray sludge. They find Caramon's own corpse, and later they find the Tower of Wayreth, a bastion of magic, wherein the only two surviving creatures are, Par-Salian, master of magic, and Astinus, the immortal being that chronicles all of time as it passes, later recording the final moments of the world.

Astinus tells Raistlin that he will be forced to be alone for all eternity, and writes that the world ends, but Caramon arrives, changing everything. He receives the last book from Astinus, and is told by Par-Salian that he must stop Raistlin from exiting the Abyss.

Afterwards, the scene goes to Raistlin in the Abyss. Raistlin is plagued by magical illusions, but he gains control of himself and sees Crysania. Raistlin faces magically induced trials. Kitiara is seen discussing plans with Soth, and then Tanis is seen speaking to Lord Gunthar Uth Wistan, Grandmaster of the Knights of Solamnia. The hallucinations return to Raistlin in the Abyss, and a physical barrage assails Crysania when she protects him. Raistlin sees yet another illusion, and in the process of overcoming it, Crysania is severely hurt and blinded. Raistlin refuses to stay with her, as she has served her purpose.

Back in Palanthas, Tanis goes to the High Clerist's Tower, where Kitiara appears in a flying citadel, a great castle that magically floats. She flies right over the Tower, however, having no need to take it as she has the death knight, Lord Soth, on her side. Tanis flies to Palanthas to warn and prepare the defense. Caramon and Tas, now in the proper time, arrive at Palanthas. They read Astinus's book and discover that Tanis dies in the battle against Soth. Tas goes to the Tower of High Sorcery at Palanthas to try to save Tanis and Caramon.

Tanis and Caramon, accompanied by Tas, take control of the citadel. They then discover from the book that Dalamar is prevented from stopping Raistlin when he is killed by Kitiara. Kitiara gets into the Tower and injures Dalamar, who lethally wounded her. Caramon and Tanis soon arrive. The wounded Dalamar is too weak to battle Raistlin so Caramon enters the Abyss, as he is now the only one who can stop Raistlin. Soth comes to claim Kitiara's body. Raistlin encounters Caramon and is told of his inevitable failure; he gives the Staff of Magius to Caramon that he might close the Portal and stop Takhisis. Raistlin is attacked by the Queen, but he is said to fall into a dreamless sleep, protected from her. Caramon comes out and closes the Portal, having retrieved Crysania, who is still alive.

The battle for Palanthas is won by the people of Palanthas at the cost of most of their city. Crysania, now back to health but permanently blind, becomes head of the church of Paladine. Dalamar seals the laboratory where the Portal is for all time. Caramon returns to his wife, Tika, and they are overjoyed to be reunited. Tasslehoff finds a spot on one of his maps that he has never been to and teleports off with the aid of the magical time traveling device.

== Characters ==
- Raistlin Majere, an evil and powerful mage bent on becoming a god.
- Crysania, a cleric of Paladine aiding Raistlin.
- Caramon Majere, warrior and twin to Raistlin, trying to stop his brother.
- Tasslehoff Burrfoot, kender aiding Caramon.
- Tanis Half-Elven, friend of Caramon, trying to defend Palanthas.
- Dalamar, apprentice of Raistlin, planning on stopping him.
- Kitiara uth Matar, half-sister of Raistlin and Caramon, trying to secure Palanthas to meet him.
- Lord Soth, death knight serving Kitiara, wants her to die so he can truly have her.

== Reception ==
Test of the Twins appeared for several weeks on The New York Times best seller list from October 12, 1986, to November 2, 1986.

Ian Hewitt, a staff reviewer from d20zines.com, stated the novel "gratifying and compellingly exciting climax to the trilogy" and awarded it an A+ rating. He mentioned that the book had to be taken in the context with the other two novels and is not a stand-alone read.
