= War of the Twins =

1986 novel by Margaret Weis and Tracy Hickman

- Cover of the first edition.
- Authors: Margaret Weis; Tracy Hickman
- Illustrator: Valerie Valusek
- Cover artist: Larry Elmore; Matt Stawicki
- Language: English
- Series: Dragonlance Legends
- Genre: Fantasy literature
- Publisher: Wizards of the Coast
- Publication date: Original: May 1986, 2nd Edition: June 2004 (hardcover)
- Publication place: United States
- Media type: Print (hardcover, paperback)
- Pages: 411
- ISBN: 0-7869-1805-5
- OCLC: 45945243
- LC Class: CPB Box no. 2217 vol. 2
- Preceded by: Time of the Twins
- Followed by: Test of the Twins

War of the Twins is a 1986 fantasy novel by American writers Margaret Weis and Tracy Hickman. Part of the Dragonlance series of novels, it is the second novel in the Dragonlance Legends trilogy, which details the journey of the fictional twins Raistlin Majere and Caramon Majere, along with Crysania and Tasslehoff Burrfoot. The book details their adventures during the Dwarfgate Wars, some 100 years after the Cataclysm, a monumental event in the Dragonlance world that altered the shape of the world. The story sees Raistlin, Caramon, and Crysania arrive in the Tower of High Sorcery at Palanthas. Caramon, before bent on stopping Raistlin's quest for godhood, must now aid him to return to his own time period.

== Plot summary ==
Upon arrival in the Tower of High Sorcery, Raistlin is tested by the undead guardians to prove that he is really the Master of the Tower. It is revealed that he has beaten Fistandantilus and absorbed his soul, thus increasing his power immensely. Raistlin goes to find the Portal to the Abyss, which is necessary to his ascension to godhood. When he goes to it, he discovers that it is not there. Having been bribed with the Globe of Present Time Passing, created by Raistlin, Astinus reveals that it is in the magical fortress of Zhaman, located in dwarven lands.

The scene shifts to Tasslehoff Burrfoot, who finds himself in the Abyss. Tasslehoff encounters Takhisis, the Queen of Darkness, who tells him how he has altered time and possibly allowed her to take over the world. Tas meets Gnimsh, a gnome, who claims he is a failure because all of his inventions worked (gnomes in the Dragonlance world constantly invent, and more often than not they fail. The gnomes believe failure is a means of learning). Gnimsh agrees to help Tasslehoff get out of the Abyss and starts to fix the device of Time Journeying.

Caramon, Raistlin, and Crysania create the so-called Army of Fistandantilus from the local populace under pretension of ravaging the dwarven kingdom Thorbadin in the far South, with Caramon being their leader. Many come to join his army, and they number several hundred. The army continues south. The hill dwarves join up with Caramon's army, believing that the mountain dwarves have stolen supplies and wealth from them. Crysania flees when Raistlin rejects her love and makes plans to bring word of the true gods to the people, 200 years before Goldmoon would during the War of the Lance. She encounters a place stricken by plague and finds a dying false cleric, who she tries to convert. She discovers that people are still too angry to accept the true gods yet. Raistlin and Caramon begin to joke and share memories. Later, Raistlin and Caramon go to the village where Crysania is. Raistlin uses his immense power to summon a massive fire that razes the town. He is in fact preparing Crysania to come with him into the Abyss with trials comparable to Huma Dragonbane's.

Caramon and his army soon capture the fortress of Pax Tharkas, thanks to the help of traitorous dark dwarves. The mountain dwarves retreat to Thorbardin and close the gates, preparing for war. Kharas, the dwarf hero, led a daring assassination attempt on Raistlin. Kharas wounds him drastically, but Raistlin has time before death. Crysania heals Raistlin, perhaps against his will. It is then discovered that Tas and Gnimsh have escaped the Abyss and were captured in Thorbardin. Raistlin appears and rescues Tas, but kills Gnimsh, presumably to correct Fistandantilus's mistake of allowing the gnome to be at the Portal when he tried to enter. Soon after, it is revealed that the dark dwarves betrayed them and had slowly killed off the hill dwarves. They attempt to assassinate Caramon, but are beaten back. Raistlin, after a last talk with his brother, opens the Portal with Crysania's help; at the same time Caramon and Tas activate their device, returning to their proper time period. The result is the explosion that levels Zhaman; however, this time, Crysania and Raistlin enter the Portal whereas Denubis, Crysania's equivalent in the past, had died and Fistandantilus had departed that plane of existence. The book ends with Raistlin entering the Abyss.

== Characters ==
- Raistlin Majere, an evil archmage, possibly the strongest to ever live.
- Caramon Majere, Raistlin's twin brother, a kind warrior.
- Crysania, a cleric of Paladine in love with Raistlin.
- Tasslehoff Burrfoot, a kender who has the power to alter time.

== Series ==
The other novels in this series are:

- Time of the Twins
- Test of the Twins

== Reception ==
War of the Twins reached 12 on The New York Times best seller list on July 20, 1986.
