= Kitiara uth Matar =

- Dragonlance character
- Kitiara (right) with Tasslehoff Burrfoot
- First appearance: "A Stone's Throw Away" by Roger E. Moore, Dragon magazine #85 (May 1984)
- Created by: Margaret Weis and Tracy Hickman

In-universe information
- Aliases: The Dark Lady, The Blue Lady
- Race: Civilized Human
- Gender: Female
- Class: Fighter
- Alignment: Neutral Evil
- Home: Solace

Kitiara Uth Matar is a fictional character appearing in the Dragonlance campaign setting created by Margaret Weis and Tracy Hickman. She is the daughter of a disgraced Solamnic Knight named Gregor Uth Matar and his first wife, Rosamun. She is also the half-sister of both Raistlin and Caramon Majere.

== Character development ==
The novel Darkness and Light details "the travels of Kitiara and Sturm before the meeting at the Inn of the Last Home at the beginning of Dragonlance Chronicles. Sturm sets off to find news of his father; Kit comes along for the adventure. Along the way, they stumble upon a flying vessel piloted by 12 gnomes who offer them a ride to Solamnia, but the group ends up on Lunitari during a war. Eventually escaping to Krynn, Sturm and Kitiara admit their attraction for each other."

The novel Dark Heart by author Tina Daniell reveals new aspects of Kitiara, whose development was shaped by her father. According to Daniell, "Kitiara has lived on the dark side of things from an early age. Her father, who was himself a mercenary, taught her about fighting. When he left, she had to fall back on her own resources and be self-sufficient. As a result, she came to value the power of being able to do and get what she wanted."

In the Ravenloft novel Knight of the Black Rose, Lord Soth wants to possess the soul of the deceased Kitiara, to make her spend eternity together with him.

In the novel Dragons of the Highlord Skies, the second release in the Lost Chronicles, Emperor Ariakis persuades Kitiara to agree to trick the Solamnic knight Derek Crownguard into questing for a recently discovered dragon orb, so that he may become enthralled by it and then compelled to serve Ariakis. However, Kitiara is led to Dargaard Keep where she will face Lord Soth instead.

== Biography ==
Kitiara is a skilled warrior, cold and calculating, and power-hungry, determined to succeed. In many ways, she and Raistlin are much alike. Neither would hesitate to betray an ally if presented with a guarantee of supreme power.

She once fell in love with a half elf named Tanis Half-Elven, and later seduced the knight Sturm Brightblade, with whom she secretly had a child, Steel Brightblade.

During the War of the Lance, Kitiara became a Dragon Highlord, with Skie as her personal dragon. She led the Blue Dragonarmy in the invasion of Solamnia. Her forces conquered most of eastern Solamnia and were prepared to attack the High Clerist's Tower, when Kitiara was recalled to meet with the Dragon Emperor Ariakas.

Emperor Ariakas rejected Kitiara's plan for a sudden attack on the High Clerist's Tower and instead instructed her to carry out his own scheme to destroy the Knights of Solamnia by tricking one of the leading knights, Knight of the Rose Derek Crownguard, into seeking out a dragon orb. During this meeting with the Emperor, Kitiara also learned that her former companions had killed the Dragon Highlord Verminaard.

A disguised Kitiara succeeded in convincing Lord Crownguard to pursue the dragon orb. She then learned that not only had Tanis, Sturm, and her brothers killed Verminaard, but Tanis was now traveling with his former girlfriend, the elven princess Laurana. This filled Kitiara with a jealous rage, especially after she heard how incredibly beautiful Laurana was, and the now obsessed Kitiara began to relentlessly stalk the elfmaid.

Kitiara finally caught up to Laurana in the city of Tarsis. After covertly watching Laurana, Kitiara decided the elfmaid was too beautiful a rival to let live and decided to kill her. Kitiara then attacked Laurana from behind, intending to drag the elfmaid off into an alley, interrogate her about Tanis, and then murder her. Kitiara expected to easily defeat the pampered princess and was shocked when Laurana fiercely resisted her attack. It was only with the help of the sivak draconian Slith that Kitiara was finally able to subdue Laurana. Kitiara and Slith dragged Laurana off into an alley, but before they could kill the elfmaid they were interrupted by none other than Lord Crownguard, leading a group of Solamnic Knights, and Elistan, a cleric of Paladine. Kitiara fled, promising Laurana they would meet again.

Meanwhile, the Emperor Ariakas had become convinced that Kitiara was plotting against him. He had her arrested and scheduled to be executed though Kitiara managed to escape with the help of the black robe wizardess, Iolanthe. Kitiara regained her standing with the Dragon Empire by convincing the death knight Lord Soth to ally with the Dragonarmies. Ariakas then sent Kitiara on a secret mission to the city of Flotsam to search for the Green Gemstone Man.

While in Flotsam, she found Tanis disguised as one of her own soldiers and assumed that he too had enlisted. This meeting rekindled their feelings for each other, and she encouraged Tanis to stay with her as her lover. But Tanis came to his senses shortly after, and fled from Kitiara in self-disgust to rejoin his companions on their flight into the Blood Sea.

In the north Kitiara was finally allowed to attack the High Clerist's Tower, the defence of which was now commanded by Sturm Brightblade and Laurana. In the course of battle, Kitiara killed Sturm, but he managed to delay her long enough to allow Laurana to successfully use a dragon orb to lure two of Kitiara's dragons into a trap. The dragon orb also caused the draconians in Kitiara's army to go berserk which lead to her army being routed. Kitiara then confronted Laurana on the tower walls. Kitiara disarmed Laurana but did not otherwise try to physically harm her. Instead Kitiara paid her respects to the fallen Sturm and taunted her rival by telling Laurana that Tanis was with her.

Kitiara then returned to Flotsam only to find that Tanis had left her. Riding Skie, she pursued the half-elf's ship into the Blood Sea but failed to capture Tanis before his ship went down in the Maelstrom.

Meanwhile, the Good Dragons had entered the war and Laurana had been appointed Commander of the Knights of Solamnia. Laurana then led her forces, known as the Whitestone Army, into battle with Kitiara's army and again Kitiara's force was defeated with Kitiara's deputy Bakaris being captured. The Whitestone Army then liberated the key city of Kalaman.

The Emperor Ariakas, then went to execute Kitiara for the defeats she had suffered. However, the death knight - Lord Soth stayed Ariakas's hand and Kitiara then managed to convince the Emperor she had a plan to capture Laurana, now called the Golden General, and defeat the Whitestone Army, by using Laurana's love for Tanis Half-Elven to lure her into a trap.

Kitiara sent a false message to Laurana, skillfully manipulating her rival by telling the elfmaid that Tanis had been mortally wounded and wanted to see her before he died, which Kitiara would only allow in exchange for Laurana returning Bakaris to her. Just as Kitiara expected, Laurana fell for this trick. The elfmaid, who already was convinced that Tanis was with Kitiara, believed the message and felt (based on her prior encounter with Kitiara at the High Clerist's Tower where Kitiara had behaved as an honorable enemy and had not tried to harm her even after catching her in an extremely vulnerable position) that she understood Kitiara and could trust her to honor a truce, so Laurana took Bakaris to the exchange site and was promptly betrayed and captured by Kitiara's forces. With the Golden General now her prisoner, Kitiara then traveled to Kalaman and threatened to execute Laurana in three weeks time unless the Whitestone Forces surrendered and Berem the Everman was turned over to her.

Later on, in the climax of the War, Tanis met with Kitiara in Neraka and offered to willing serve the Highlord if she would release Laurana. Kitiara agreed to consider his offer, but she had already made a promise to give Laurana's soul to Lord Soth. Kitiara then had the captured Laurana put on display for the evil goddess Takhisis in the audience chamber of the Temple of Neraka.

Tanis managed to turn the tables on Kitiara though when he murdered Emperor Ariakas with help from Raistlin, and seized the Crown of Power. Tanis was about to trade the Crown of Power for his and Laurana's freedom when Laurana broke free on her own. Laurana immediately attacked Kitiara, stealing the Highlord's sword and knocking Kitiara to the ground. Tanis tried to stop Laurana which caused her to shove him off the platform, leading to Tanis dropping the crown.

The various Dragonarmy factions began fighting over the crown and Tanis and Laurana were able to escape. Kitiara soon tracked down Tanis and Laurana after their escape and Kitiara then again gave Tanis the chance to become her lover forever. He refused in favor of Laurana. Kitiara then allowed them to escape from her and Lord Soth. Lord Soth mocked her for this, but Kitiara claimed that by letting the two escape she had insured she would always live in Tanis's heart which would forever poison his relationship with Laurana.

After the War of the Lance, Kitiara led her Dragonarmies against the city of Palanthas in a campaign known as the Blue Lady's War. She was hoping to stop her half-brother Raistlin in his quest to defeat Takhisis as she believed the goddess would greatly reward her for this service. As Kitiara's troops battled the Palanthians, she fought her way into the Tower of High Sorcery in Palanthas and even managed to take Raistlin's apprentice, Dalamar by surprise and stab him. However, Kitiara failed to finish Dalamar off and he then mortally wounded her with his magic. It was then that Kitiara realized she had been betrayed by Lord Soth, who had become obsessed with her and planned to bind her soul to him for eternity.

Kitiara pleaded with Tanis Half-Elven (who had arrived in the tower shortly after her fight with Dalamar) to protect her from Lord Soth. Tanis nearly did so despite the fact that he had no way to defeat the powerful death knight. However, both Dalamar and Lord Soth reminded Tanis of all he would be throwing away, and after thinking about his wife, Laurana, and the life he hoped to have with her, Tanis stood down and allowed Lord Soth to take the dying Kitiara.

Having achieved what he wanted Soth then withdrew his forces from the battle. Without their undead allies, the remaining Dragonarmy forces were defeated by the Palanthians, though the city was devastated in the fighting.

Kitiara died, but her soul vanished before the death knight could bind it. Both Lord Soth and the dragon Skie tried to find her soul, but they both failed.

== Family tree ==
Caramon Majere (Elder)	Unknown Woman
Gilon Majere	Rosamun	Gregor Uth Matar
Tika Waylan	Caramon	Raistlin	Kitiara Uth Matar	Sturm Brightblade
Tanin	Palin	Usha	Laura	Steel Brightblade
Sturm	Ulin	Linsha	Dezra

== Reception ==
Lauren Davis of io9 commented on the "wonderful female characters" in the series, singling out what she considered two of the strongest: "Kitiara Uth Matar and the princess Laurana, are rivals for the heart of Tanis Half-Elven, but their status as romantic rivals isn't what makes them compelling characters. I'll admit that reading the books as a pre-teen, I admired Kitiara, who was sexy and manipulative (and attracted some of the most powerful male characters in the books), but also respected as a military leader and seen as a peer by a mighty dragon. Laurana, however, gets the more significant arc, after starting out as a lovelorn girl with a romantic view of the world. As she is thrust into war-torn Ansalon, however, Laurana proves herself a competent fighter and military leader in her own right, one who watches friends die, who sees herself shunned by her family, but who marches on tirelessly to protect Krynn from the forces of Takhisis. As seductive as Kitiara is, as a young girl I was inspired watching the growth of Laurana."

In the Io9 series revisiting older Dungeons & Dragons novels, Rob Bricken commented that "my least favorite moment in Spring Dawning—and maybe in the entire trilogy—is when Kitiara sends a message to Laurana, who has been kicking the draconian asses of Takhisis' forces all across Krynn [...] Laurana offers no proof that she has Tanis, and Tas and Flint explain repeatedly that they know Kitiara and she's definitely lying—but ignoring the war, the pivotal role she plays in it, the troops that need her in command, and the people she's supposed to protect, Laurana goes anyway, like she's the moon-eyed girl from Autumn Twilight. She's captured instantly, of course. Again, it's like Weis and Hickman knew they wanted Laurana at the Temple of Takhisis for the final act but were given 10 minutes to brainstorm on a narratively satisfying way they could make it happen, and this is the best they could come up with. Oh, also, Kitiara tells all the combined forces of good they have three weeks to unequivocally surrender and let the literal embodiment of evil rule over Krynn or Laurana will be killed. Admittedly, Laurana was extremely good at her job, but why would they choose eternal darkness and subjugation over a single person?"

== Other media ==
=== Video games ===
Although deceased in the story by that time, Kitiara made a "surprise appearance" in Death Knights of Krynn.

=== Dragonlance movie ===
The 2002 winner of the American Library Association's Alex Award author Mel Odom reviewed the film and noted that it includes a cliffhanger in which Kitiara is shown "in the middle of evil doings".

== Sources ==
- The Annotated Chronicles (1999), by Margaret Weis and Tracy Hickman
- Kindred Spirits (April 1991), by Mark Anthony and Ellen Porath
- Steel and Stone (September 1992), by Ellen Porath
- The Companions (January 1993), by Tina Daniell
- The Inheritance (May 2001), by Nancy Varian Berberick
- Darkness and Light (1989), by Paul B. Thompson and Tonya C. Cook
- Kendermore (August 1989), by Mary Kirchoff
- Stein, Kevin (2000). Brothers Majere: Preludes vol. III. Wizards of the Coast. ISBN 0-7869-2971-5.
- Weis, Margaret (2003). The Soulforge: Raistlin Chronicles vol. I. Wizards of the Coast. ISBN 0-7869-1314-2.
- Weis, Margaret; Perrin, Don (2000). Brothers in Arms: Raistlin Chronicles vol. II. Wizards of the Coast. ISBN 0-7869-1429-7.
- Weis, Margaret; Hickman, Tracy (2002). Dragons of Summer Flame. Wizards of the Coast. ISBN 0-7869-2708-9.
- Weis, Margaret; Hickman, Tracy (2000). Time of the Twins: Legends vol. I. Wizards of the Coast. ISBN 0-7869-1804-7.
- Weis, Margaret; Hickman, Tracy (2000). Test of the Twins: Legends vol. III. Wizards of the Coast. ISBN 0-7869-1806-3.
- Dark Heart
- The Dark Queen
