= Valerie Valusek =

Artist

- Known for: Fantasy art

Valerie A. Valusek is an artist whose work has appeared in role-playing games. She is the sister of Jay E. Valusek, author of Museum of Voices: An Autobiographical Miscellany, where she is mentioned briefly.

== Works ==
Valerie Valusek has produced interior illustrations for many Dungeons & Dragons books and Dragon magazine since 1985, as well as interior art for several Dragonlance novels, and cover art for the 1992 module Rary the Traitor. Her interior art has been featured in Wizards and Rogues of the Realms (1995). She has also produced some artwork for other games including Paranoia (West End Games), Torg (West End Games), Changeling: The Dreaming (White Wolf), and Legend of the Five Rings (Alderac Entertainment Group).

== Published works ==
- "Lady of the Winds: Pick a Path to Romance and Adventure", (1983) (book)
- Advanced Dungeons & Dragons 2nd Edition The Complete Fighter's Handbook, (1989) (source book) ISBN 0-88038-779-3
- Rary the Traitor, (1992) (source book) ISBN 1-56076-497-X
- Dragonlance Legends Time of the Twins, (2001) (book) ISBN 0-7869-1804-7
- Dragonlance Legends War of the Twins, (2002) (book) ISBN 0-7869-1805-5
- Dragonlance Legends Test of the Twins, (2002) (book) ISBN 0-7869-1804-7
