= Dragonlance Legends =

Fantasy novel trilogy by Margaret Weis and Tracy Hickman

- Time of the Twins; War of the Twins; Test of the Twins
- Author: Margaret Weis and Tracy Hickman
- Country: United States
- Language: English
- Genre: Fantasy
- Publisher: Random House/TSR, Wizards of the Coast
- Published: 1986
- Media type: Print
- No. of books: 3
- Preceded by: Dragonlance Chronicles
- Followed by: Dragonlance: The Second Generation

Dragonlance Legends is a trilogy of fantasy novels written by Margaret Weis and Tracy Hickman, which take place in the Dragonlance setting. This series is the sequel to the Dragonlance Chronicles, and focus on Raistlin and Caramon. The three books in the series are Time of the Twins, War of the Twins and Test of the Twins.

The trilogy has two major story arcs: Raistlin Majere's aspirations to godhood, and his twin Caramon Majere's attempts to stop him; and the machinations of Kitiara uth Matar, the twins' half-sister, and her attack on the city of Palanthas as part of the Blue Lady's War. It also features Crysania of Tarinius, a Revered Daughter of Paladine; Tasslehoff Burrfoot; Dalamar Argent, Raistlin's dark elf apprentice; the death knight, Lord Soth; and Tanis Half-Elven.

== Synopsis ==
=== Time of the Twins ===
Two years after the War of the Lance, Raistlin Majere makes plans to challenge Takhisis, the Queen of Darkness, and assume her place in Krynn's pantheon of gods. To do so, he requires the aid of a cleric of Paladine to open the portal that leads to Takhisis's abode in the Abyss. He chooses Crysania of Tarinius for this purpose, misleading her into believing that she may be able to sway him from the evil path that he walks.

Crysania attempts to enlist the help of Caramon, Raistlin's twin, in a journey to the Tower of High Sorcery in the Forest of Wayreth. However, Kitiara has learned of Raistlin's ambitions and hopes to deprive him of Crysania's help by sending the death knight, Lord Soth, to kill Crysania.

Crysania is incapacitated, but Caramon and Tasslehoff are able to bring her to the Tower of High Sorcery. Raistlin has travelled back in time to the days just before the Cataclysm in order to study with the dark wizard Fistandantilus. Caramon asks the Conclave to send him back in time as well, with the dual purpose of healing Crysania and killing Fistandantilus.

Sent back in time to Istar, with Tasslehoff as an unintended companion, Caramon discovers that Raistlin has already killed Fistandantilus and taken his place. Crysania is healed by the clerics of the time, and Raistlin convinces her to help him destroy Takhisis. Caramon comes to the realisation that his twin cannot be redeemed, and tries to kill him just as the Cataclysm strikes. His attack fails, and Raistlin casts a time travel spell, taking himself, Caramon and Crysania to another time.

=== War of the Twins ===
Crysania and the twins arrive in the Tower of High Sorcery in Palanthas, approximately one hundred years after the Cataclysm. Raistlin is chagrined to find that the portal to the Abyss has moved to the fortress of Zhaman, far to the south.

Having assumed Fistandantilus's identity, Raistlin soon discovers that he seems doomed to repeat Fistandantilus's past actions as well. As the three travellers head south, they almost unwittingly begin to amass an army under the pretence of attacking the dwarven kingdom of Thorbardin, just as Fistandantilus did - an effort that led to Fistandantilus's death.

Raistlin gains hope that history can be changed when Tasslehoff reappears, having escaped the Abyss - he was sent there with the Temple of Istar when it was destroyed. The army reaches Zhaman and Raistlin begins the spell to open the portal, with Crysania's help. However, his magic is disrupted when Caramon and Tasslehoff attempt to use a magical device to return to their own time.

=== Test of the Twins ===
The magical device catapults Caramon and Tasslehoff into the future, where they are shocked to find that the world has been almost destroyed by the battle between Raistlin and Takhisis, leaving it ravaged and lifeless. They travel back to the present to stop Raistlin from leaving the Abyss.

Raistlin battles Takhisis's minions in the Abyss with Crysania's help. Crysania is mortally wounded, but Raistlin leaves her behind, telling her that he no longer needs her.

Caramon and Tasslehoff arrive in Palanthas to find it under attack by Kitiara's forces. They fight their way to the Portal in the Tower of High Sorcery, and Caramon enters the Abyss to stop Raistlin.

After seeing the future that will come about if he leaves the Abyss, Raistlin chooses to stay behind to stop the Dark Queen from passing through the Portal into Krynn, while Caramon and Crysania flee to safety. With Raistlin's help, Caramon seals the Portal shut, and Krynn is saved.

== Reception ==
Dragonlance Legends appeared on the 2024 Game Rant "31 Best Dungeons & Dragons Novels, Ranked" list at #2.

== Reviews ==
- Science Fiction Chronicle

== Bibliography ==
- Margaret Weis; Tracy Hickman (2000). Time of the Twins: Legends vol. I. Wizards of the Coast. ISBN 0-7869-1804-7.
- Margaret Weis; Tracy Hickman (2000). Test of the Twins: Legends vol. III. Wizards of the Coast. ISBN 0-7869-1806-3.
