= Raistlin Majere =

Fictional character from Dragonlance books

- Dragonlance character
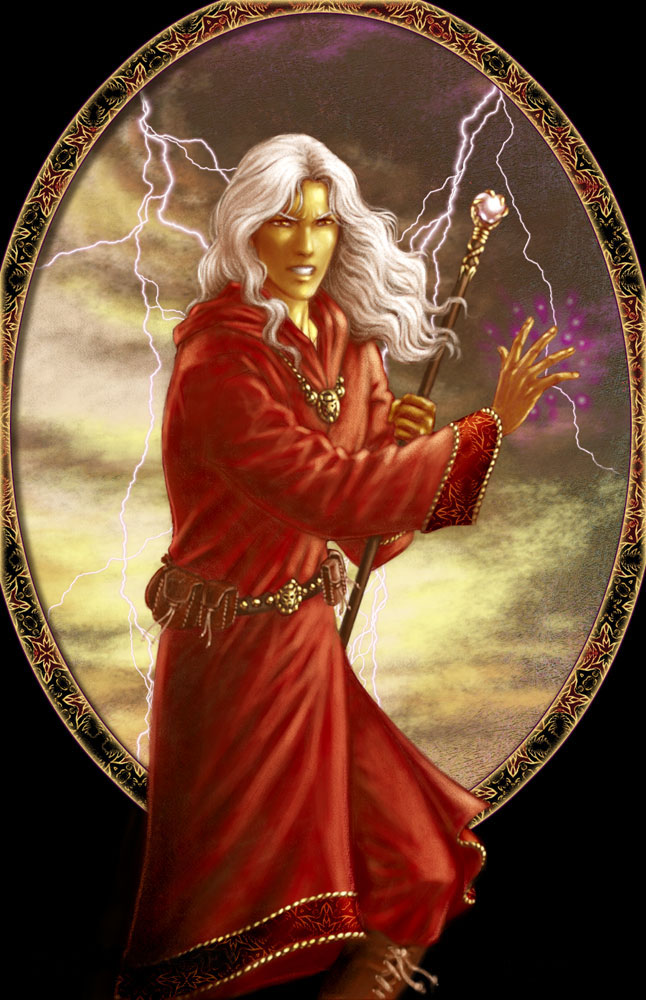
- Image by Vera Gentinetta.
- First appearance: Dragon #83: short story "The test of the twins" by Margaret Weis (March 1984)
- Created by: Margaret Weis
- Voiced by: Kiefer Sutherland (2008 animated film)

In-universe information
- Race: Civilized human
- Gender: Male
- Class: Wizard of High Sorcery
- Home: Solace

Raistlin Majere is a fictional character from the Dragonlance series of books created by Margaret Weis and Tracy Hickman. Raistlin played an extensive role in the two main series of books, particularly in Dragonlance Legends in which he was both primary protagonist and antagonist. He is twin brother to Caramon Majere, half-brother to his protective sister Kitiara uth Matar, and a significant member of the Heroes of the Lance. In the animated movie adaptation, Dragonlance: Dragons of Autumn Twilight, Raistlin was voiced by Kiefer Sutherland.

Born to a mother prone to trance-like fits and a woodcutter father, Raistlin inherited his mother's aptitude for magic. He undertook and passed the arduous Test of High Sorcery, but in the process, he acquired white hair and golden skin and was cursed with hourglass eyes which saw the effects of time on all things. His health, while never robust, was ruined further, leaving him weak and subject to frequent bouts of coughing blood. Initially wearing the white robes of good, as the first series progresses Raistlin's powers increase while his mood and actions darken, he goes to neutral red robes for the majority of the "War of the Lance" series until he adopts the black robes of evil while under the tutelage of "Fistandantilus" during the War of the Lance.

Raistlin, although physically very weak, is extremely intelligent, and possesses uncommonly powerful magical abilities. While ruthless in his pursuit of power, he holds to a code of conduct which repays all debts and protects those disadvantaged through no fault of their own. His relationship with his much stronger, better-liked, and good-natured twin brother Caramon is fraught with tensions as Caramon seeks to protect and shelter his weaker brother while denying his cruelty and penchant for hurting any others while in pursuit of his goals.

== Publication history ==
Some of characters of the Heroes of the Lance were introduced in a series of stories published in Dragon magazine; the first of these was "The test of the twins" in Dragon #83 (March 1984), a story featuring twin brothers Raistlin and Caramon.

== Character profile ==
Raistlin Majere was created by Margaret Weis and Tracy Hickman as one of several characters to be involved in an epic Advanced Dungeons & Dragons campaign which they had written and designed. This was the beginning of the Dragonlance saga. Raistlin was given to one of the players, Terry Phillips, to play. As Margaret Weis describes in the foreword of her prequel book, The Soulforge, Terry Phillips is the man responsible for much of Raistlin's sarcastic and caustic character, taking it to depths that neither she nor Hickman had ever imagined. Raistlin is also Margaret Weis's favorite character. According to Hickman in the foreword to The Soulforge, "[we] were just settling in to the game when I turned to my good friend Terry Phillips and asked what his character was doing. Terry spoke...and the world of Krynn was forever changed. His rasping voice, his sarcasm and bitterness all masking an arrogance and power that never needed to be stated suddenly were real. Everyone in the room was both transfixed and terrified. To this day Margaret [Weis] swears that Terry wore the black robes to the party that night." According to Weis, "People can identify with Raistlin. We can relate to feelings that nobody loves us, to the struggle for recognition and acceptance. I really understood Raistlin right off the bat."

Raistlin is best described as the archetypal antihero or tragic hero. He is a Wizard of High Sorcery who first bears the red robes that mark him as a worshipper of Lunitari. During the five years in which the future Heroes of the Lance go their separate ways, Raistlin takes the Test of High Sorcery at the Tower of Wayreth, where he acquires golden skin and is cursed with hourglass eyes that cause him to see time as it affects all things. (This appearance was originally invented by Dragonlance cover artist Larry Elmore, "because it would look just great"). He also becomes even more frail and sickly than before. In Raistlin's vision, all things wither and die before him; however, long-lived races such as elves only appear to age slightly, while the Irda do not appear to age at all. Raistlin views magic as a way to compensate for lacking the physical strength and personal charisma that his brother has, and for the inadequacy he feels about having to rely on others.

A torn individual, Raistlin exhibits a strong superiority complex (as far as his power in magic and his intelligence are concerned), and knows almost nothing of true loyalty to others (although, despite this, Raistlin usually keeps his promises and pays his debts). He only follows Tanis Half-Elven, the unofficial leader of the companions, because he feels that doing so will ultimately benefit him (At one point, early in Dragons of Winter Night he tells Laurana: "I do not follow Tanis. We are merely traveling in the same direction... for the time being."). He is also condescending and extremely resentful regarding his lack of physical strength, especially as he is often forced to rely on his twin brother for support, generating feelings of jealousy towards his twin rather than feelings of affection and gratitude. Raistlin harbors a secret hate for his twin's physical power and easygoing manner, and for the attention and comradeship it seems to earn him, as Raistlin's own appearance and secretive nature causes others to be mistrustful and apprehensive. Caramon, conversely, holds Raistlin in high regard and tries to protect him.

These factors ultimately culminate in Raistlin's turn to evil. He dons the black robes worn by evil wizards (those who worship Nuitari) and eventually rises to become the most powerful mortal on Krynn (through a deal he made with the ancient archmage Fistandantilus during his test in the Tower of High Sorcery).

Contrary to his usual nature, Raistlin holds a soft spot for others who are treated poorly because of weaknesses that are not their fault (such as gully dwarves). He befriends the gully dwarf Bupu through his kindness. He identifies with such people and is thus quick to help them as he is quick to help himself. There are also rare instances when Raistlin feels genuine regret that he cannot return to the times of his childhood when he was capable of feeling love, a common lament throughout the series.

== Early life ==
As described in the fantasy novel The Soulforge, Raistlin Majere and his twin brother Caramon were born in the town of Solace, Abanasinia, to a woodcutter named Gilon Majere and his wife, Rosamun (who, because she possessed magical abilities but was forced to suppress it by her upbringing, had a habit of slipping into uncontrollable trances). They were preceded by an older half-sister, Kitiara uth Matar, the product of Rosamun's first marriage to a purported ex-Solamnic Knight, Gregor uth Matar. Raistlin was born sickly and on the verge of death. In fact, the midwife felt that the baby Raistlin should be allowed to die as an act of mercy. Only due to Kitiara's stubborn refusal to let him die (and subsequent treatment and care) did he finally overcome the infantile ailment and live.

Possibly as a result of this early illness, Raistlin was always a sickly child, but possessed a fierce intellect, in stark contrast to his slow-thinking, but not unintelligent, physically stronger twin. In fact, according to the common lore of the world of Krynn (supported by statements made by the god, Paladine, in the closing chapters of Dragons of Spring Dawning), identical twins were considered to be one person split in two. For this reason, Raistlin believed he had been given the mind, and Caramon the body.

Kitiara, still driven by a desire to find a use for her brothers, was annoyed by Raistlin for this same reason. She knew Caramon would make a great warrior, but she did not know what to do with his brother. The answer came when a powerful archmagus of the White Robes, named Antimodes, stopped for a night in Solace. Kitiara, after much effort, persuaded the archmage to talk to Raistlin, who impressed the archmage with intellect and wisdom beyond what Antimodes felt should be possessed by a child of six. He was also frightened by another trait Raistlin possessed: the desire to control others. However, after this meeting, Antimodes personally saw to Raistlin's enrollment in a school for magic, even paying for his first semester's tuition.

As years passed, Raistlin learned the basics of the arcane tongue from his schoolmaster, and was taunted and isolated by his schoolmates who termed him "the Sly One". However, Raistlin, rather than being upset by this lack of acceptance, enjoyed the fact they feared him enough to try to destroy him. When the time came for his first test of magic, a test conducted by writing the words "I, Magus" on a lambskin which would burn into the skin if he possessed the ability, at first nothing happened. After a desperate prayer to the three gods of magic, who visited him and made him swear to worship them, the words lit up with such ferocity that the skin was utterly consumed.

It would be several more years before Raistlin finally learned to cast his first spell. The twins were sixteen. While Raistlin was away for his schooling, a widow by the name of Judith began to take care of Rosamun, the twin's and Kitiara's mother. Widow Judith was a believer in the snake god Belzor, who had a growing following; it appeared as if Judith was of great help for Rosamun, for their mother showed evidence of much improvement under the widow's care...nevertheless, Raistlin was not fond of the woman, and she held him in disdain for his interests in magic.

His father, Gilon, was mortally injured in a terrible logging accident and was brought back to Solace just in time to say a few last words to his sons. Widow Judith comforted the distraught Rosamun, insisting that the god Belzor would perform a miraculous healing for her husband. When Gilon died, Widow Judith argued that it had been Rosamun's lack of faith, her daughter Kitiara's unsavory lifestyle, and Raistlin's study of magic which caused the god to forsake Gilon in his time of need. When Raistlin spoke out against Judith's claims, the woman made to attack him. The people of Solace had apparently heard enough, for they ran Widow Judith out of town. Rosamun, struck dumb by the sudden loss of her husband, fell into one of her trances, sinking so deep that she never re-emerged. She died three days later. At her funeral, driven nearly senseless and hallucinating with his grief, Raistlin showed great disregard for the inclement weather that oversaw it and fell into a deep fever. He only survived due to the unexpected return of Kitiara, who fought death over her brother once more and, like before, defeated it. It was after Raistlin's recovery when Caramon was overcome by terrible dreams, that Raistlin finally learned what it took to use the magic and cast a sleeping spell over his brother.

Raistlin and his brother formed a friendship with other citizens of Solace who would one day become their fellow Heroes of the Lance. These friendships and the mentorship of Flint Fireforge and Tanis Half-Elven helped fill the gap that the sudden loss of their parents had created. Raistlin's skills continued to grow even as he developed a love for herbalism and played an instrumental role in saving Solace from a plague.

When the twins were in their early twenties, they accompanied Flint, Tanis, and the kender, Tasslehoff Burrfoot, to Haven for a market fair. It was there that Raistlin encountered the cult of the false god Belzor, and where he again met the Renegade Wizard, Judith, who was using magic to bamboozle the townspeople into believing in her. By revealing she was using magic and not the powers of a god (by casting a spell of his own), Raistlin proved that she was a charlatan, destroying her cult and at the same time invoking the wrath of the townspeople against himself, coming dangerously close to being burned at the stake.

However, the spell Raistlin had used was illegal for him to cast, as an untested mage, by the law of the Conclave of Wizards. Rather than discipline him, less than one year later, the Conclave decided to summon Raistlin to the Tower of High Sorcery at Wayreth Forest to take the Test. This in itself was astonishing for no one so young had ever taken the grueling test, which touted death as the price of failure. Raistlin and his brother left Solace, being unable by Conclave law to tell anyone where they were going, and made their way to the Tower.

== The Test ==
The Soulforge, which is the true account of Raistlin's Test according to Astinus of Palanthus, finds Raistlin in the Inn Between on the outskirts of the town of Haven. After being invited to drink with three elves, named Liam, Micah, and Renet, they offer Raistlin a job. They need a mage to go into the house of the town's mageware shop, owned by Lemuel, a friend of Raistlin's, in order to rob it of the treasures said to be there. Raistlin, initially planning to warn Lemuel, agrees to go in after the elves tell him that they know of secret spellbooks hidden in the shop. After entering the house and going into the basement alone, Raistlin encounters the evil Fistandantilus. Realizing that he is taking the Test and that the elves (in actuality powerful dark-elf mages themselves) will kill him for even speaking with Fistandantilus, the evil lich offers him a bargain: Raistlin's life force in exchange for the power to pass the Test and defeat the elves.

Raistlin accepts, and when Fistandantilus unlocks the basement door after teaching Raistlin a spell, the elves attack, casting a magical fireball too quickly for Raistlin to react. In desperation and out of instinct, Raistlin throws up his hands to stop the fireball that is hurtling towards him. However, instead of obliterating him, it "burst on him, over him, around him. It burst harmlessly, its effects dissipated, showering him with sparks and globs of flame that struck his hands and astonished face and then vanished in a sizzle, as if they were falling into standing water." Raistlin casts the spell learned from Fistandantilus and kills the three dark elves.

After the battle, Raistlin notices that his skin has turned a gold color, forming a magical armor that had protected him from the fireball. Fistandantilus denies that he created the armor for Raistlin, telling Raistlin that it is an armor of his own making. Realizing that this armor will protect him from Fistandantilus taking his life force, Raistlin reneges on his bargain. As he leaves the cellar, an enraged Fistandantilus threatens Raistlin, telling him that his Test is not yet over and that if even a crack should appear in the armor, Fistandantilus will take the life promised to him.

Finding himself magically transported back to the Tower of Wayreth, Raistlin believes his Test is over. Feeling a breath of air hitting his neck, Raistlin manages to turn his body, changing what would have been an instantly killing knife thrust into one that does severe damage but leaves him alive. Liam, one of the dark elves, had survived the spell in the basement. In pain and failing strength, Raistlin overcomes the deeply wounded dark elf and kills Liam with his own blade. Raistlin realizes that the blade Liam wielded had been covered with poison, and passes out, expecting to die.

Raistlin regains consciousness to find his brother, Caramon, walking towards him. Caramon picks Raistlin up, intending to bring his brother out of the Tower and away from the Test, which inflames Raistlin's feelings of weakness. As Caramon carries his brother out, the floating head of Fistandantilus appears, intent on taking what little life force Raistlin has left. As Raistlin prepares to cast a final spell that he knows will kill him in his weakened state, Caramon suddenly conjures lightning that strikes the floating head. After another blast of Caramon's magic lightning, the head of Fistandantilus disappears, leaving Raistlin to wonder what just happened. Caramon tells Raistlin that the spell was something he could always do, but since he preferred sword and shield, he had never told Raistlin. Raistlin snaps:

"It wasn't the physical pain that clouded his mind. It was the old inner pain clawing at him, tearing at him with poisoned talons. Caramon, strong and cheerful, good and kind, open and honest. Caramon, everyone's friend. Not like Raistlin—the runt, the Sly One. All I ever had was my magic,' Raistlin said, speaking clearly, thinking clearly for the first time in his life. 'And now you have that, too.' Using the wall for support, Raistlin raised both his hands, put his thumbs together. He began speaking the words, the words that would summon the magic...Beneath the layer of cold, hard rock, jealously bubbled and seethed. Tremors split the rock. Jealousy, red and molten, coursed through Raistlin's body and flamed out of his hands. The fire flared, billowed, and engulfed Caramon."

After Caramon's death, Fistandantilus comes to claim Raistlin's life, reaching into Raistlin's chest and grabbing his heart. Raistlin grabs at the mage's wrist, telling Fistandantilus that while he may take his life, he would serve Raistlin in return.

Raistlin later learns that he did not, in fact, kill his brother. The Caramon in the tower had been an illusion created by Par-Salian, formed to show Raistlin the depths of his own hatred and arrogance. The real Caramon had been a witness to his brother's fratricide, in the hopes of severing the connection between the two brothers. This plan backfired, however, as Caramon forgives Raistlin, believing him to not be in his right mind because of the Test, and with Raistlin's health severely crippled, Raistlin is even more dependent on his brother than ever. Any memory of Fistandantilus is gone (Par-Salian believing that this was Fistandantilus's own doing, so Raistlin would not fight him), and Raistlin believes his health has been destroyed due to the battle with Liam. Par-Salian, in order to teach Raistlin compassion and patience, curses him with the eyes of the sorceress Raelana, turning his pupils into an hourglass shape that shows him the effect of time on everything: "Youth withers before those eyes, beauty fades, mountains crumble to dust". As compensation for what he deems a necessary cruelty, Par-Salian gives Raistlin the Staff of Magius, one of the most powerful magical artifacts in existence, as well as a recipe for herbal tea that will help relieve Raistlin's now constant and wracking cough. Told to never tell anyone the story of what had happened in the Tower, the two brothers leave, with Raistlin now wearing the Red Robes of Neutrality. The Staff grants Raistlin numerous magical powers. The change in Raistlin between when he lacks and possesses the Staff has been compared to the difference between Dr. Jekyll and Mr. Hyde.

== Mercenary work ==
Not long after Raistlin left the Tower of High Sorcery, he and his brother found themselves in financial straits. It was also at this time that they heard of an army of mercenaries (led by the Mad Baron of Langtree) - information given to them by the white-robed wizard Antimodes, a close friend of Par-Salian. During this period Raistlin and Caramon encountered two new friends: a brown-robed mage (brown robes given to those who never take the test) named Horkin, and a half-kender named Scrounger.

During this same period, Kitiara had traveled to Sanction and met Ariakas: the man who was currently favored by Takhisis. Ariakas did not yet trust Kitiara, and he gave her a mission to lure Immolatus, a red dragon, to his command. The dragon, embittered by the loss of his treasure, had declined orders to join forces with Ariakas. Kitiara's guile and quick-thinking led to her triumphant return to Ariakas with a dragon in tow.

It was when Raistlin first encountered Immolatus that a new ability of Raistlin's cursed eyes was revealed. Upon encountering a dragon garbed in mortal guise, he could see partially through its transformation. In the book Brothers in Arms, the first encounter with Immolatus is described as such:

What Raistlin saw was a blurred portrait, two faces instead of one, two faces in a botched painting, as if the artist had allowed all the colors to run together. One face was the face of a human wizard. The other face was more difficult to see, but Raistlin had a fleeting impression of red, vibrant red, glittering red. There was something reptilian about the man, something reptilian about his second face. (298)

Immolatus mistakenly thought that Raistlin was a descendant of Magius, for he possessed the Staff of Magius. After Raistlin was intimidated by the disguised red dragon, he escaped the tent and returned to his own army's camp. It was Immolatus' mission to locate for Takhisis the eggs of the gold and silver dragons that lay in the mountains where the nearby city of Hope's End was besieged. Raistlin and Caramon, taking their wounded to a temple that had once belonged to Paladine, Leader of the gods of Light, found themselves exploring it, along with Scrounger. It was there that the twins ran into Immolatus again. At the conclusion of Brothers in Arms, Raistlin and Caramon remain with the army.

== Involvement in the War of the Lance ==
After Raistlin passed his Test in Brothers Majere, Ansalon was engulfed in the conflict that would be known as the War of the Lance. During this time, Raistlin helped to fight the darkness threatening to consume all of Krynn. He and his companions played a critical role, and would collectively become known as the Heroes of the Lance. Raistlin's magic powers increased at a dramatic rate as the war progressed. He gained control of a potent artifact known as the Dragon Orb of Silvanesti which he took from the dying elven King Lorac Caladon.

While caught in Lorac's Dragon Orb-induced dream he makes his first appearance donning black robes. To that point he had not yet converted to the side of evil. However his presence in the dream donning black served as foreshadowing. A common device in the early parts of the Chronicles series is Raistlin's hearing of an unknown voice in his mind. During this dream Raistlin hears this mysterious voice telling him that in order to save his life and the life of his comrades he must be willing to accept the black robes. Later while dying in the Library of Palanthas he pledges his loyalty to the God of Evil Magic, Nuitari, and accepts the black robes.

Dragons of the Hourglass Mage details Raistlin's adventures in Neraka after becoming a wizard of the Black Robe and chronicles the significant maturation of the character between his introduction in Dragons of Spring Dawning and later appearances, addressing many previously-unanswered questions. In this lord city ruled by the Dark Queen, Raistlin discovers that Takhisis means to take control of all magic, and must stop her from doing so.

His acceptance of the black robes, however, was not approved by the Conclave, effectively making Raistlin a renegade wizard. It wasn't until later when Raistlin has manipulated events to put himself in a position of power over the Conclave, that he demanded they make no effort to hunt him or to interfere with him in any way. The Conclave agreed, and Raistlin's intervention prevented the death knight Lord Soth from destroying the Tower of Wayreth and the wizards within.

Fistandantilus was able to petition the Dark Queen for a mysterious item known as the Key of Knowledge, which Raistlin was able to use to unlock a number of ancient tomes and gain vast power in the process. His ambition, however, was such that he betrayed the Dark Queen, ultimately bringing the War of the Lance to an end and leaving him as the most powerful force on Krynn.

He then took up residence in the Tower of High Sorcery of Palanthas, fulfilling an ancient prophecy that had foreseen his appearance as the Master of Past and Present. He spent two years inside the Tower, learning its secrets, studying spells and experimenting.

Such was his power then that two years later, the historian Astinus, in Time of the Twins, described Raistlin's entry into the Tower as this:

Two years ago, he entered the Tower of High Sorcery. He entered in the dead of night in darkness, the only moon in the sky was the moon that sheds no light. He walked through the Shoikan Grove - a stand of accursed oak trees that no mortal, not even those of the Kender race, dare approach. He made his way to the gates upon which hung still the body of the evil mage who, with his dying breath, cast the curse upon the Tower and leapt from the upper windows, impaling himself upon its gates - a fearsome watchman. But when he came there, the watchman bowed before him, the gates opened at his touch, then they shut behind him. And they have not opened again these past two years. He has not left, and if any had been admitted, none have seen them. (11 & 12)

== Legends ==
Raistlin's attempt at godhood was chronicled in the Dragonlance Legends Trilogy. The plans he has made drive the conflict in Time of the Twins, the first novel in the series. The trilogy also explored the relationship between Raistlin and his twin Caramon.

Although the Conclave had previously believed that Raistlin harbored plans to conquer the world, they later learned, through Raistlin's apprentice (and Conclave spy), Dalamar, that Raistlin's ambition stretched much further than this. Raistlin studied Fistandantilus's voluminous works on crossing the threshold between god and man, and decided to embark on an attempt to kill Takhisis, the Queen of Darkness, and take her place among the gods. He became arrogant after the final victory over the dragons, and to attain godly power he sought the help of dark forces. To recover knowledge lost during the Cataclysm, Raistlin travelled backwards through time to just before it, during the reign of the Kingpriest. Challenging the still-living Fistandantilus, Raistlin wins the duel and steals the archmage's identity, memories, and life force. The white wizard Par-Salian sent Caramon, the cleric of Paladine Crysania, and, by accident, the kender Tasslehoff Burrfoot to the same time period in a desperate attempt to stop him. The presence of Tasslehoff horrified Par-Salian, as unlike humans, elves, ogres, and dragons, kender (who came into being by accident, not a creation of the gods) are capable of changing time. Crysania's presence was an effort to wake her from a coma brought on by a confrontation with the death knight Lord Soth, something only the Kingpriest of Istar could accomplish. This played into Raistlin's plans, as the Abyss, the realm in which Takhisis resided, had to be accessed through a gateway which could only be opened through the combined actions of a black-robed wizard of purest evil and a priest of Paladine of purest good.

Tasslehoff, at Raistlin's prompting, remained in Istar in an effort to stop the Cataclysm by activating a time-travel device given to Caramon so that he (alone) could return to their time, in the Temple of Istar. It was the intent of the wizards for Crysania to either follow the true priests who were gathered unto the gods prior to the Cataclysm, or die when the fiery mountain struck Istar, thereby thwarting Raistlin's plans. The instructions Raistlin gave Tasslehoff dismantled the device instead, as Raistlin's plan was to leave Tas dead by the Cataclysm so he could not alter history. Instead, he is forced into the Abyss where he manages to escape with the assistance of an also-trapped gnome, whose ingenuity managed to repair the time-travel device. Raistlin, Caramon, and the now-awakened Crysania escape the Cataclysm and travel forward in time to Dwarfgate Wars, which are initiated by Raistlin in order to access the portal to the Abyss in Zhaman. In the guise of Fistandantilus, Raistlin attempts to open the portal. Tas and his gnome companion arrive and return the time-travel device to Caramon, whose simultaneous use of the device with Raistlin's powerful magic results in a titanic explosion. Unlike the actual Fistandantilus, Raistlin is able to control the magical fluctuations and enter the Abyss with Crysania. As Raistlin made his way through the Abyss to confront Takhisis, Crysania bore the brunt of all the attacks of Takhisis's minions. As her life was spent, Raistlin left Crysania to die, having used her fully.

The magical explosion pushes Caramon and Tasslehoff into the future, where it is revealed that Raistlin was successful in defeating Takhisis and has gone on to destroy the other gods and all life on Krynn. Caramon and Tas trek through the ruined Krynn, to the remains of the Tower of High Sorcery in Wayreth. There they find Par-Salian, trapped as a half-human statue of marble, being tortured by the spirit of Raistlin. Also there is Astinus, the mortal form of the god Gilean, writing his final entries into the Chronicles of Krynn. Pressed for whatever information he can give them before dying, Par-Salian tells Caramon and Tas that to prevent this future from happening, Raistlin must not be allowed to leave the Abyss. Unable to create new life, Raistlin becomes the sole living creature in the universe, a snake devouring its own tail.

Caramon and Tasselhoff attempt to stop Raistlin by returning to the time when Raistlin is on his way to lure the Queen of Darkness out of the Abyss, at the Tower of High Sorcery in Palanthus. Caramon confronts Raistlin with his experience of the future and Raistlin's solitary, meaningless existence. After dragging the memory from Caramon's experience of the future, Raistlin was convinced of what Caramon warned. Raistlin tells his twin to take Crysania back to Krynn and gives up his life preventing Takhisis from passing through the portal. Though grieved at Raistlin's fate, Caramon has a vision of Paladine rescuing Raistlin's spirit and the story is retold throughout Krynn which leads to Raistlin becoming a popular hero.

== Raistlin's return ==
In the later short story, The Legacy, Caramon's son Palin is summoned for his Test, winding up at the Tower of High Sorcery in Palanthas. Dalamar attempted to bring an illusion of Raistlin there for Palin's Test; however, Raistlin summoned himself there. In his monologue, he states: "I didn't do it for you, mages! I didn't do it for the conclave! I didn't do it for my brother! I had one more debt to pay in my lifetime. Now I have discharged it." It has been revealed by Margaret Weis that this "last debt" was to magic itself.

Raistlin returned again, a year later, during the Chaos War. He was instrumental in the defeat of Chaos, even though the gods had stripped him of his power as the price for his hubris.

Raistlin's spirit also assisted the gods to find Krynn at the conclusion of the War of Souls, after Takhisis who was claiming to be the "One God" stole Krynn and transported it to another part of the galaxy. His soul is still lingering because he refuses to go on unless it is with his brother Caramon. He was able to locate Krynn because he could sense Tasslehoff Burrfoot using the device of time journeying. Then, with his brother Caramon and the Heroes of the Lance, Raistlin finally joined the River of Souls, and disappeared for the final time.

== Raistlin's daughter ==
The heroine of Dragons of Summer Flame is a new character, and according to Margaret Weis, "a woman who may or may not be Raistlin's daughter".

A legend that sprung up after the events in Test of the Twins was the story of "Raistlin's daughter", which tells of Raistlin having a daughter with an Irda. Caramon denied the story, though if it were true he would have no memory of the event. During the Chaos War, Usha Majere, a human girl reared by the Irda, was introduced. She suspected that she was Raistlin's daughter, but Raistlin denied it when he encountered her, stating that Usha was born of two human parents and was certainly no daughter of his. He also asserted that no magic in the world could steal the knowledge of having been loved.

== Family tree ==
Caramon Majere (Elder)	Unknown Woman
Gilon Majere	Rosamun	Gregor Uth Matar
Tika Waylan	Caramon	Raistlin	Kitiara Uth Matar	Sturm Brightblade
Tanin	Palin	Usha	Laura	Steel Brightblade
Sturm	Ulin	Linsha	Dezra

== Other media ==
=== Gamebooks ===
Terry Phillips, who played Raistlin as a player character in the games Tracy Hickman ran as part of developing Dragonlance, authored the Super Endless Quest gamebook The Soulforge. This gamebook allowed the reader to take the role of Raistlin and attempt to pass the Test of High Sorcery.

=== Video games ===
Raistlin appears as one of the player characters in Advanced Dungeons & Dragons: Heroes of the Lance. Raistlin wields a magic staff and is able to cast eight spells.

In The Dark Queen of Krynn, the player characters must save Raistlin who is imprisoned in the Abyss.

=== Miniature figures ===
Raistlin was included in Ral Partha's Dragonlance Heroes boxed figures set of lead miniatures. A reviewer for Dragon magazine complimented the work Ral Partha did in matching the appearance of their figures to the descriptions of the characters from the novels, and described his figure: "Raistlin is the picture of a mage casting a spell. He wears a long, fringed, hooded robe with a cape reaching to his ankles. His boots are plain, but his belt is woven. His face is set in concentration. Clutched in his upraised left hand is his staff, which ends in a large gnarled hand clutching a crystal ball. A wealth of well-detailed spell components hangs from his belt."

=== Music ===
References to Raistlin have appeared in several other media, most notably in heavy metal music. The Swedish band Lake of Tears recorded a song called "Raistlin and the Rose" for its 1997 album Crimson Cosmos. "The Soulforged", by German metal band Blind Guardian, is another song inspired by Raistlin's story. The song appears on the band's 2002 album A Night at the Opera. "Wishmaster", a song by Finnish metal band Nightwish also pays tribute to Raistlin. Among other references, the song uses the word "Shalafi" (the elven word for "master", used by Dalamar toward Raistlin), and there is a lyric that reads "if you hear the call of arcane lore / your world shall rest on earth no more." The song first appeared on the 2001 album of the same name. The song is one of the most popular among the fans and is still played in concerts. In 2010 a Russian musical titled "Последнее испытание (The Last Trial)" emerged, telling the whole story of Legends in 39 songs, written over more than 10 years by Anton Kruglov and Helena Khanpira.

=== Dragonlance movie ===
Kiefer Sutherland headlined the animated movie Dragonlance: Dragons of Autumn Twilight, voicing Raistlin, who was one of the main characters in the film. Sutherland was selected, according to co-executive producer Cindi Rice, "because he is an amazing actor but he also has a distinctive voice, with a naturally raspy, breathy quality, which we felt would help convey Raistlin's distinctive illness and quiet power." The tag line of the movie "Chaos. War. Death. This is what I see." is a quote from Raistlin.

== Reception ==
The character was popular enough for Margaret Weis and Tracy Hickman to base the Dragonlance Legends Trilogy around the character's relationship with his twin. The final book of the trilogy Test of the Twins appeared on the NY Times bestseller list for several weeks in 1986.

Jason Heller, of The A.V. Club, described Raistlin as "Dragonlance's breakout star", referring to him as "Dragonlance's sarcastic, scene-stealing son of a bitch" and "the eerie, complicated protagonist-bordering-on-antagonist who didn't do much to hide his contempt for people and lust for power". Hellers calls the twin brothers Caramon and Raistlin the series's most compelling characters: "Caramon is a large, powerful, goodhearted, slightly childlike warrior; Raistlin is a sickly, complicated, mysterious, morally iffy magician. The dynamic feels like it's lifted straight from Thor and Loki, and that archetypal resonance is what Weis and Hickman are obviously shooting for. And almost entirely hit."

Lauren Davis of io9 commented on Raistlin: "The most memorable character from the Dragonlance series, the one whose name is almost synonymous with the books, is Raistlin Majere. Weis and Hickman have often commented that Hickman is better at writing noble characters and Weis better at writing darker ones, and Raistlin is Weis' signature."

Raistlin Majere was #2 on Game Rant's 2020 "10 Must-Have NPCs In Dungeons & Dragons Lore To Make Your Campaigns Awesome" list — the article states that "Many regard Raistlin as the most powerful mage who has ever lived. Adventurers who meet Raistlin may encounter him as a full-fledged Wizard. In this form, he possesses golden skin and hourglass eyes that pierce through the veil of time– and with it, whatever vision of the past or the future that awaits the campaign."

Philosopher Christopher Robichaud considered Raistlin Majere to be "the greatest D&D character ever".

In the Io9 series revisiting older Dungeons & Dragons novels, Rob Bricken described Raistlin as "The breakout character of the first Dragonlance series" and that although his red robes mark him as neutral (as white robes are good, and black robes are evil), "everyone except his brother mistrusts him. Everyone else constantly assumes he's secretly planning something evil, even though he never does anything evil in Autumn Twilight. He's very caustic and solitary, which is quite understandable in my opinion."

Bricken later commented that in Dragons of Spring Dawning, "Raistlin finally goes full black robes, first by teleporting himself off the maelstrom-bound ship, abandoning everyone else, including his devastated twin brother Caramon" but noted that "Weis and Hickman manage to give the new black mage shades of gray by having him join the forces of Takhisis, only to help Tanis kill the goddess' most powerful acolyte, Emperor Ariakis. Then Raistlin allows Berem to return the gem to the column to lock the divine dragon away." Bricken adds that Raistlin "makes clear he's done all of this because it's made him the most powerful force of evil on Krynn, but then he still saves Tasslehoff and Tika from death. He's evil, but he still has a soft side in there somewhere, which has caused him to be one of Dungeons & Dragons' most beloved characters."
