= Time of the Twins =

Book by Margaret Weis and Tracy Hickman

- Cover of the first edition.
- Authors: Margaret Weis; Tracy Hickman
- Cover artist: Larry Elmore; Matt Stawicki
- Language: English
- Series: Dragonlance Legends
- Genre: Fantasy literature
- Publisher: Random House
- Publication date: February 1986
- Publication place: United States
- Media type: Print (hardcover, paperback)
- Pages: 421
- ISBN: 0-7869-1804-7
- OCLC: 46000797
- LC Class: CPB Box no. 2217 vol. 1
- Followed by: War of the Twins

Time of the Twins is a 1986 fantasy novel in the Dragonlance series by American writers Margaret Weis and Tracy Hickman. It is the beginning of the Dragonlance Legends trilogy, a series detailing the journey of fictional twins, the warrior Caramon Majere and the mage Raistlin Majere, along with the cleric Crysania. The book details the start of their adventure.

== Plot introduction ==
The book opens with a meeting between the devout cleric, Crysania, the historian, Astinus, and the dark mage, Raistlin. Crysania is determined to stop Raistlin from following the path of darkness. At the end of their meeting, he invites her to the Tower of High Sorcery of Palanthas.

== Plot summary ==
After detailing the meeting between Crysania, Raistlin, and Astinus, the book shifts to the character Riverwind arriving at the Inn of the Last Home in Solace. He meets Tika Waylan there, and later he asks about Caramon. Tika avoids the question, as Caramon has become a fat drunk in the two years the companions had been apart. Soon, Tanis Half-Elven arrives as well, bringing with him Crysania. The pair of them had been followed and chased by dark creatures, who were sent by Raistlin. Later, Tika casts Caramon out of the house to accompany Tas, Crysania, and Bupu (a gully dwarf who fell in love with Raistlin), who are travelling to the Tower of Wayreth. En route, they encounter Lord Soth, a death knight, who would have killed Crysania had not Paladine interceded and brought her soul to dwell with him. The group continues on to the Tower where they find out Raistlin plans to travel back in time and gain power to challenge Takhisis, head god of evil, and take her place. It is decided that the group, minus Tas and Bupu, will go back to stop him. This serves a twofold purpose, as Crysania can find the healing she needs in the past. However, during the spell, Tas interrupts and goes back with them, defying the law that kender, dwarves, and gnomes cannot go back in time for fear of disrupting and changing it.

The group finds themselves in pre-Cataclysm Istar, a holy empire and residence of the Kingpriest, the most powerful cleric in the world. Thanks to Raistlin's intercession, guards discover them and they think that Caramon has attacked Crysania, as he is dressed in rags and she is covered in blood. Crysania is taken to the Temple of Paladine, home of the Kingpriest, and Caramon is taken to the Games of Istar, a colosseum-like arena which pits contestants against each other in mock fights. Raistlin has sent Caramon to the Games so that he can regain his former strength and recover from alcoholism. Unbeknownst to Caramon, Raistlin has in fact bought Caramon for the games. Caramon realizes that it is necessary to kill Fistandantilus to save Raistlin. After getting back into shape and being duped into killing a fellow gladiator, Caramon enacts his plan. Once he is about to kill Fistandantilus, he finds out that Fistandantilus has been replaced by Caramon's brother, Raistlin. Caramon cannot kill him; it is revealed that Raistlin has taken Fistandantilus's lifeforce into himself, fully taking control of his body.

The scene shifts to Crysania, who is talking to Denubis, an old cleric. When Crysania leaves, the ancient elven cleric Loralon contacts Denubis and takes him away, as all true clerics in the world were taken away before the Cataclysm. Crysania then goes to the Kingpriest's chamber and meets Raistlin there. He reveals the Kingpriest for what he is, a mere man. Crysania runs, broken, from the chamber. Later, around Yuletime, she meets again with Raistlin and he warns her of the anger of the gods. Caramon, back at the games, discovers that Raistlin had nothing to do with the death of the man Caramon had killed in the games. Caramon, after meeting with Crysania, tries to deter some friends of his from staying in Istar, but they do not listen. Caramon then goes after the magical device that can return one person (not many people, as Caramon believes) to their proper time, but finds Tas has taken it in the hopes of preventing the Cataclysm. Finding out that Raistlin has arranged for Caramon's friends to fight him in the Arena, Caramon decides that he must kill Raistlin.

Tas, with the magical time travelling device, goes to the chamber where the Kingpriest will make his demand of the gods for great power in order to defeat evil. Crysania also arrives, as she wants to hear his exact words. Crysania is contacted by Loralon, but refuses his offer to go with him. The Kingpriest makes his demand of the gods.

Caramon begins the battle against his friends at the same time Tas activates the device. To Tas's horror, the device falls apart. Caramon then fights his friends, resulting, though not by his choice, in their deaths. Crysania, Tas, and Caramon rush to Raistlin's chambers beneath the Temple, as Istar crumbles around them. Tas is pinned beneath the falling ceiling. Caramon approaches Raistlin, bent on killing him. However, Crysania risks her life to save Raistlin, and she stops Caramon long enough with a prayer so that Raistlin may complete the time-travel spell that will save them from the Cataclysm.

At the end of the novel, the Cataclysm strikes.

== Characters ==
- Raistlin Majere, a black-robed mage and possibly the most powerful magic-user on the face of Krynn.
- Caramon Majere, the twin brother of Raistlin Majere and a powerful warrior.
- Tasslehoff Burrfoot, a cheerful kender.
- Crysania, a devout cleric of Paladine.

== Reception ==
Wendy Graham reviewed Time of the Twins for Adventurer magazine and stated that "The cover is fairly awful, but the story isn't bad, considering that I am so tired of magicians and all that stuff. Isn't anyone writing good straightforward SF any more?"

== Reviews ==
- Magia i Miecz #29 (May 1996) (Polish)
- Kliatt
