= Sturm Brightblade =

- Dragonlance character
- Sturm (right) and Flint Fireforge.
- First appearance: "A Stone's Throw Away" by Roger E. Moore, Dragon magazine #85 (May 1984)
- Created by: Margaret Weis and Tracy Hickman
- Voiced by: Marc Worden (2008 animated film)

In-universe information
- Race: Civilized human
- Gender: Male
- Class: Knight of the Crown
- Home: Solamnia

Sturm Brightblade is a fictional character from the Dragonlance series of role playing games and novels, based on the Advanced Dungeons & Dragons franchise. The character was created by Margaret Weis and Tracy Hickman and is published by Wizards of the Coast.

The knight Sturm Brightblade is one of the six Heroes of the Lance. Sturm appeared in the first novel of the Chronicles Trilogy, Dragons of Autumn Twilight (1984). As with the other main characters of the trilogy, Sturm's proper creation was during a role-playing game session where Tracy Hickman, Laura Hickman, Margaret Weis, and Terry Phillips, between others, developed the guidelines and main story for the Dragonlance setting.

== Appearances ==
Although Sturm Brightblade is introduced by Margaret Weis and Tracy Hickman in Dragons of Autumn Twilight (1984), this and the other core Dragonlance novels do not cover his childhood. However, in 1987, the year of Love and War's first publication, Tonya R. Carter and Paul B. Thompson finally cover his childhood in a short story.

We see Sturm again as an adult in Dragons of Autumn Twilight (1984) by Margaret Weis and Tracy Hickman as a typical paladin of the D&D type. Sturm soon meets Caramon Majere, Tanis Half-Elven and Raistlin Majere, revealing to them that his ancient suit of armor (later receives his blade as well) is all he has from his father, thus the greatest pride of his life.

In the second novel of the Chronicles series, Dragons of Winter Night (1985), written by the same authors, Sturm Brightblade becomes a more active member of the Companions, as he helps recover a Dragon Orb, an ancient magical artifact able to control dragons. At the end of the novel he sacrifices himself to allow the defeat of the enemy army, ending his participation in the series.

Paul B. Thompson and Tonya C. Cook's novel, Darkness and Light (1989) featured Sturm Brightblade and Kitiara uth Matar, working together to reach Solamnia, as Sturm travels to seek news about his father; the pair eventually admit that they are attracted to one another. This travel would be used as a background for Margaret Weis and Tracy Hickman's short story "Kitiara's son", published in The Second Generation (1995), with an already dead Sturm, in which the authors reveal that Kitiara had in fact seduced Sturm during their travels together, seeking to corrupt him after Sturm had repeatedly berated her for her unscrupulous ways. Unknown to Sturm, Kitiara later bore him a son named Steel Brightblade.

Michael Williams's novel The Oath and the Measure (1992), fourth in The Meetings Sextet series, gives more information about Sturm's father during Sturm's quest to meet Lord Wilderness, Lord Vertumnus, the only person who informs the true story about the Brightblade castle's fall and his father's death. At the end of the novel, Sturm is formally accepted as a Squire of the Knights of Solamnia.

Several books mention Sturm's mother, Anna Brightblade. Margaret Weis in the novel The Soulforge (1998), reveals how she died when a plague struck Solace, while feeding the poor and tending the sick as written by the Oath and the Measure, the code of conduct every knight must fulfill. This marks a turning event in Sturm's life as, not bound by an earlier promise to protect his mother anymore, he decides to travel to Solamnia to discover his father's whereabouts.

== Importance in Dragonlance ==
Margaret Weis and Tracy Hickman had decided, since the conception of the Chronicles Trilogy, that Sturm's appearances would end before any of the other characters, as explained by the authors:

We did not "kill" Sturm arbitrarily. The noble Knight of Solamnia was intended to be a tragic hero from the first inception of the project.

According to the Dragonlance timeline defined by the authors, the Knights of Solamnia were an association of honorable knights fell in disgrace as the regular citizens of the fictional world of Krynn blamed them for not being able to stop the Cataclysm, the event in which the Krynnish gods threw a fiery meteor against the world to punish its inhabitants for their pride. The authors determined that Sturm Brightblade, technically a Squire, a knighthood member who is learning the codes and skills needed to be knighted, would restore the honor of the Knights of Solamnia by sacrificing himself during a battle against the Dragonarmies of Ansalon, armies supporting Takhisis, the goddess of darkness.

The decision is hinted during the first book of the trilogy, Dragons of Autumn Twilight (1984), when the group of friends meet the Forestmaster, the unicorn protecting the mysterious Darken Woods, with the paragraph:

"Be at ease, warrior," she said. "The deer fulfills his purpose in life by providing sustenance for the hunter—be it wolf or man. We do not mourn the loss of those who die fulfilling their destinies."
It seemed to Tanis that the Forestmaster's dark eyes went to Sturm as she spoke, and there was a deep sadness in them that filled the half-elf's heart with cold fear.

— Margaret Weis and Tracy Hickman, Dragons of Autumn Twilight, chapter 11

Weis and Hickman had explained, throughout the first two books of the Chronicles series, that a number of factions divided the Knights of Solamnia, making them unable to take decisions to prevent the spread of the invasion by the Dragonarmies of Ansalon, successfully describing a world where hope was almost nonexistent. However, by using his sacrifice, they were able to put an end to the internal quarrels of the association, turning it into the only armed organization able to stop the forces of evil. Sturm is killed by Kitiara while defending Solamnia.

In The Annotated Chronicles (1999), Hickman reveals that, while working with the story, he came across a Norse legend in which a king, while standing in the battlements of his fortress, saw an arrow coming his way. A vision flashed in the king's mind, informing the arrow would kill him but, because of it, his warriors would fight courageously until winning the battle. This story was used as inspiration for Sturm's final battle.

Although the authors had foreshadowed his death through two books, the character's end caused an uproar between fans which surprised the authors, Weis explains in the Annotated Chronicles, to the point of being accused of "not caring" about Sturm. In this book, however, both state they cried while writing the scene.

Books refer to Sturm Brightblade as a major hero of the Knights of Solamnia, at the same level of Vinas Solamnus, founder of the knighthood, and Huma Dragonbane, who defeated Takhisis in the final battle at the end of the Age of Dreams. In Dragons of a Lost Star (2002), the second book of the War of Souls trilogy, Weis and Hickman write that Laurana Kanan, Queen Mother of the Qualinesti elves, prayed to Sturm moments before confronting Beryllinthranox, the green dragon overlord, while in Jeff Crook's The Rose and the Skull (1999), Crysania of Tarinius, head of Paladine's church, name him along with the two previously mentioned heroes.

The character has a major role in the development of another Dragonlance character, Steel Brightblade, as described by Weis and Hickman in The Second Generation and Dragons of Summer Flame (1995).

== Characteristics ==
The type of weapon Sturm carries is a two-handed sword, although much of the artwork depicting Sturm, as well as the figurine released by Ral Partha in the "Heroes of the Lance" miniatures box set, show him carrying a one handed sword. And in Dragons of Autumn Twilight it is described as a "....splendid, if old-fashioned, two-handed sword". Later Dragonlance supplements name the weapon as the Brightblade. It is inscribed with runes of friendship that give the sword's wielder a bonus to charisma checks. It is also said that the sword will not break unless its owner breaks first, strongly implying that as long as the wielder remains strong in the face of adversity, staying resolute and not breaking either in fear or principle, the weapon will never break. Later Steel Brightblade, a Knight of Takhisis, uses his father's sword, the Brightblade, in the Chaos War.

Sturm's long, thick mustaches, the age-old symbols of the Solamnic Knights, are a source of pride. His armor is old, dating "almost back to the Cataclysm", and all that is left of his inheritance. Raistlin revealed to Steel that he could not stand Sturm, who was always preaching, always telling the 'correct' course of action. Raistlin told the young man, however, that he liked Sturm better after he discovered the man was only made a knight shortly before his death, that Sturm had all his life been living by a code to which he was not bound—a code that many so-called true Solamnic Knights were only playing lip service to. In Raistlin's opinion, Sturm had been a true knight his entire life.

== Reception ==
Lauren Davis of io9 called Sturm a "would-be knight who masks his insecurities behind a strict code of honor", and commented that his flaws make him human and let readers recognize who he is: "an ordinary man who just means to do the right thing".

Jeff Gerke called Sturm a great example of "The Principled Hero". Describing Sturm's actions as "maddening" to his compatriots, Gerke went on to write, "while people might object to Sturm's internal code of conduct, it was impossible not to like the man." Gerke argued that Sturm's strong code of ethics makes him a character with whom the reader can connect, whether or not the reader agrees with his decisions. Montse Sant in her work The Book of the Dragon called Sturm "the brave noble".

In the Io9 series revisiting older Dungeons & Dragons novels, Rob Bricken commented that "A Knight of Solamnia, much like Huma, except the Knights are now despised because they couldn't stop the Cataclysm from happening, which seems rather unfair. This might be why Sturm is frequently depressed, sometimes to the point he's nearly catatonic. Been there, Sturm!" Bricken commented that in Dragons of Winter Night, "It's [...] satisfying for Sturm to have things to do in addition to brooding, such as when he's unwillingly caught in the political machinations of the Knights and forced to watch Derek lead most of them away in a failed suicide charge against the armies of Takhisis. Then he has to lead his few remaining soldiers to hold a tower against three blue dragons and a High Lord."

== Other media ==
=== Video games ===
Sturm appears as one of the player characters in Advanced Dungeons & Dragons: Heroes of the Lance.

=== Miniature figures ===
Sturm was included in Ral Partha's Dragonlance Heroes boxed figures set of lead miniatures. A reviewer for Dragon magazine felt that Ral Partha successfully matched their figures to the descriptions of the characters in the novels, and described his figure: "Sturm is a typical example of a knight or high-level fighter. He is dressed from neck to boots in a chain-mail shirt and leggings. The boots are heavy leather with plates protecting the front of the ankles and shins. Plate also protects his thighs and shoulders, with an ornate breastplate and groin protector. He is wearing an engraved horned helmet, and he has a stern look that is backed up by his raised runesword. Leather gauntlets protect both hands, and a plain shield is on his left arm. This shield has no engraving on it to match the illustration on the box. I recommend that you get a magnifying glass and carefully trace out a design on another sheet of paper before attempting the shield freehand."

=== Dragonlance movie ===
Sturm featured in the direct-to-video movie Dragonlance: Dragons of Autumn Twilight. He was voiced by Marc Worden. Worden said he enjoyed the experience of playing Sturm, calling him "a tragic hero, a committed, and valiant knight".
