= Valusek =

Valusek is a surname. Notable people with the surname include:

- Valerie Valusek, American artist
