= Dragonlance: Dragons of Autumn Twilight =

- DVD cover art
- Directed by: Will Meugniot
- Written by: George Strayton (screenplay); Margaret Weis (original); Tracy Hickman (original)
- Produced by: Steven Stabler
- Starring: Kiefer Sutherland; Lucy Lawless; Michael Rosenbaum; Michelle Trachtenberg
- Music by: Karl Preusser
- Production company: Toonz Animation
- Distributed by: Paramount Home Entertainment
- Release date: January 15, 2008
- Running time: 90 minutes
- Country: United States
- Language: English

Dragonlance: Dragons of Autumn Twilight is a 2008 American animated fantasy adventure film. It is the first film to be based on the Dragonlance campaign setting of the Dungeons & Dragons role-playing game. It is based on the first novel written for the campaign setting, Dragons of Autumn Twilight (1984), co-written by Margaret Weis and Tracy Hickman, both of whom gave assistance for the film's screenplay adaptation by George Strayton. The film was directed by Will Meugniot and distributed by Paramount Pictures, directly to video.

== Plot ==
The film begins with the return of a group of friends consisting of Tanis Half-Elven, Sturm Brightblade, Caramon Majere, Raistlin Majere, Flint Fireforge, and Tasslehoff Burrfoot. Kitiara Uth Matar, the half-sister of the twins Caramon and Raistlin, was supposed to be there as well, but for reasons unexplained at the time could only send a mysterious note. The Companions had separated five years previously to pursue their own quests.

On the eve of their reunion, the Companions discover that Solace, the village where many of them made their home, is very different from the peaceful village they had left five years previous. Solace has been taken over by a religious order called the Seekers. The Seekers are collaborating with the Dragon Highlords, who are preparing for the conquest of the continent of Ansalon.

Solace is now an armed camp as hobgoblin soldiers patrol the once peaceful village. Tanis, Flint, and Tasslehoff meet up outside of Solace, and as they enter the village, they are accosted by Fewmaaster Toede: a hobgoblin commander, and some of his minions. Forced to fight, the threesome kill Toede's minions, and continue to the Inn of the Last Home to meet up with their friends, and, as circumstance would have it, two barbarians, Riverwind and Goldmoon. Meanwhile Kitiara Uth Matar is absent, having sent a letter to Tanis saying that "her new lord is keeping her busy".

The Companions soon discover that the Seekers are searching for a Blue Crystal Staff. When Hederick, a Seeker, is accidentally burned after Riverwind pushes him into the fireplace, Goldmoon heals him with her Blue Crystal Staff, a holy artifact of the goddess Mishakal which possesses healing powers.

Upon seeing Goldmoon with the item he had been searching for, Hederick calls for the guards, causing the Companions to flee Solace. Unknown to them at the time, this pulls the Companions into a great struggle against the goddess Takhisis, the Queen of Darkness and leader of the enemy forces.

The companions cross a nearby lake by boat in their escape, and Raistlin notes that the constellations known as "The Valiant Warrior" and "The Queen of Darkness" (representations of the True Gods Paladine and Takhisis) are absent from the sky, which he claims means that the two gods, the heads of good and evil, respectively, have come to Krynn.

The next day, the group is attacked by Draconians. These creatures are numerous among the Dark Queen's armies, and often serve as foot soldiers. The Companions are driven into the woods known as "Darken Wood" where they encounter undead warriors who, upon seeing the staff, make them go to the Forestmaster. The Forestmaster charges the group to go to the ruined city of Xak Tsaroth to retrieve the Disks of Mishakal, containing the teaching of the True Gods and instrumental for the restoration of the faith in the True Gods.

After a trip on the backs of pegasi, the companions enter Xak Tsaroth and eventually meet some gully dwarves, diminutive and stupid creatures. One of the dwarves, Bupu, leads them to the dragon Onyx, who is killed by the holy power of the Blue Crystal Staff. When this happens, Goldmoon is consumed by its flame and presumed dead. However, they find her later resting at the foot of a statue of Mishakal, which now bears the Blue Crystal Staff, having blessed Goldmoon with true clerical powers.

The Companions leave with the Disks of Mishakal, and Bupu also gives an ancient spellbook (formerly belonging to the archmage, Fistandantilus) to Raistlin and then returns home to her fellow gully dwarves. After returning to Solace to look for someone who might be able to read the Disks, and finding it occupied, the Companions are captured by the evil armies and, along with an elf named Gilthanas, the son of the leader of the elven nation of Qualinesti, are captured and chained in a slave caravan.

En route to the fortress and mining site of Pax Tharkas, the group is freed by Gilthanas's brother Porthios. They escape to Qualinesti and decide to incite a rebellion in Pax Tharkas and free the slaves in the Dragon Highlord Verminaard's control. The Companions journey through a secret passage underground to Pax Tharkas and devise a plan to free the slaves. They also heal Elistan, a dying Seeker, and the leader of the slaves.

While trying to sneak women and children away from Pax Tharkas, the Companions are attacked by the Dragonlord Verminaard and his dragon. However, his dragon is killed by another, insane, dragon. After his dark goddess Takhisis turns away from him in order to battle with Paladine, Verminaard is killed by Tanis and Sturm. Elistan is able to read the Disks, and Goldmoon and Riverwind are married.

== Cast ==
- Kiefer Sutherland as Raistlin Majere
- Lucy Lawless as Goldmoon
- Michael Rosenbaum as Tanis Half-Elven
- Michelle Trachtenberg as Tika Waylan
- Jason Marsden as Tasslehoff Burrfoot
- Fred Tatasciore as Flint Fireforge / Fewmaster Toede / Hederick
- Rino Romano as Caramon Majere
- Neil Ross as Paladine / Fizban
- Marc Worden as Sturm Brightblade
- Phil LaMarr as Riverwind / Gilthanas / The Speaker of the Suns
- Kellyanne Ortega as Bupu / Brinna
- David Sobolov as Verminaard
- Caroline Gelabert as Laurana
- Nika Futterman as Takhisis
- Mari Weiss as The Forestmaster
- Ben McCain as Elistan
- Dee Bradley Baker as Porthios / Pyros / Erik
- Susan Silo as Flamestrike
- Juliette Clair as Onyx

Tracy Hickman and Margaret Weis, the authors of the novels, make cameo appearances as patrons of the Inn of the Last Home.

== Production ==
According to co-executive producer Cindi Rice, the film combines "traditional 2D animation and computer-generated 3D elements". The animation was developed by the Trivandrum-based studio Toonz Animation. The artwork style is similar to the Dragonlance comics. A rough trailer was released in October 2007 and can be found on the official site.

== Reception ==
Reaction to the film was predominantly negative. Dan Heaton describes it as a "disaster" and "tiresome". David Cornelius says it is "genre cheese and sloppy filmmaking". Michael Stailey declares: "It's been a long time since I've come across a film this bad".

Jason Heller, of The A.V. Club, commented that this film "went direct to video, and for good reason. It's terrible. Not even the voice-acting talents of Kiefer Sutherland and Lucy Lawless can save its shoddy, out-of-date animation and flat storytelling, which isn't much of a step above the '80s D&D cartoon. And a lot less sweet".

Ryan Harvey of Black Gate commented: "If Wizards of the Coast, the current owners of the Dungeons & Dragons media franchise, had serious intentions of starting a successful line of direct-to-video animated films based on the Dragonlance and Forgotten Realms novels, they couldn't have done a finer job of slicing themselves off at the knees with a broadsword than this disaster of a movie".

Major complaints have included:

- The condensation of the novel into a 90-minute film (Heaton: "characters have no time to breathe...doesn't sell the book's expansive scope"; Cornelius: "clumsy bouncing from scene to scene"; Stailey: [the adaptation] "puts the entire tale on fast forward"). Large portions of the book are entirely left out of this film, which proceeds at breakneck pace. Co-author Tracy Hickman opposed this choice, saying in his review that "I believe including the entire first book in the movie was a mistake. Both the screenwriter and I argued against putting all of Dragons of Autumn Twilight in the first film ... believing that the film should portray essentially the first half of the book and finish with 'Solace is burning'". "Solace is burning" refers to the last line delivered in chapter 22 as spoken by the character Raistlin. Fifteen chapters, sectioned off as "Book 2", follow this statement.
- The animation, a combination of 2D footage and CGI (Heaton: "extremely inconsistent"; Cornelius: "the combo is a mess"; Stailey: "the overall look is reminiscent of the worst animation '80s and '90s television had to offer"). Tracy Hickman agreed with the above points, saying "the animation itself is less than I would have hoped it to be" and that "the mix of CGI with traditional cell animation worked quite well ... but it was the graphic inconsistencies between cell animation segments that I found problematic". However, his overall reaction is positive, and he describes it as "the opening of a door and the beginning of a journey".

The soundtrack, by Karl Preusser, was included on the first ballot for a Grammy Award in three separate categories, including Best Score Soundtrack, Best Song in a Motion Picture ("Qualinesti Hymn"), and Best Engineered Album Non-Classical.
