= Marc Worden =

Canadian actor

- Born: David Marc Worden; Toronto, Ontario, Canada
- Other name: Mark Worden
- Occupation: Actor
- Years active: 1986–present

David Marc Worden is a Canadian actor.

== Early life and education ==
David Marc Worden attended Churchill Heights Public School in Scarborough, Ontario from grades 4 through 8. He was a student in the gifted program. He made his first known stage appearance as Sandy the dog in the school's musical production of Annie in 1986.

== Career ==
Worden started his career in Toronto, Ontario, Canada, in television and theater. In 1990, he relocated to the United States to work for the Walt Disney Company and has remained there ever since.

Following community theatre performances in the Toronto Civic Light-Opera Company's productions of The King and I and The Wizard of Oz, as well as taking dance and musical theatre classes with Roland and Romaine Studios in Toronto, Worden made film appearances on two episodes of the television series Katts and Dog. He was a cast member for 5 seasons on the Disney Channel's The All New Mickey Mouse Club from 1990 to 1994. In 1997, Worden appeared in two episodes of Star Trek: Deep Space Nine, the last of four actors to portray Alexander Rozhenko, Worf's son.

In addition to onscreen appearances on film and television, Worden has done extensive voice work on animated series and films, starting with Batman Beyond in 1999, as well as numerous video games, starting with Blade Runner in 1997.

== Personal life ==
Worden currently resides in Los Angeles, California. He is married to Mari, with whom he has three sons.

== Filmography ==
=== Film ===
Year	Title	Role	Notes
1997	The Maker	Simon	
1998	The Lesser Evil	Young Ivan	
1999	Pirates of Silicon Valley	Chris Larson	Television film
1999	Come On Get Happy: The Partridge Family Story	Hippie Hanger On	
2004	Sky Blue	Shua	Voice, English dub
2006	Ultimate Avengers	Tony Stark / Iron Man	Voice, direct-to-video
2006	Ultimate Avengers 2	Tony Stark / Iron Man	Voice, direct-to-video
2007	The Invincible Iron Man	Tony Stark / Iron Man	Voice, direct-to-video
2008	Dragonlance: Dragons of Autumn Twilight	Sturm Brightblade	Voice, direct-to-video
2010	Planet Hulk	Tony Stark / Iron Man	Voice, direct-to-video

=== Television ===
Year	Title	Role	Notes
1986	The Judge	Terry	Episode: "Just Leave Me Alone"
1989–90	Rin Tin Tin K-9 Cop	Julio Kowalski	2 episodes
1995	Night Stand with Dick Dietrick	Tyler	Episode: "I'm Sorry"
1996	Space: Above and Beyond	Neil West	Episode: "Toy Soldiers"
1997	Star Trek: Deep Space Nine	Alexander Rozhenko	2 episodes
1998	Felicity	Jerry	Episode: "Hot Objects"
1999	Batman Beyond	Scab, Jody	Voice, 3 episodes
2000	Nash Bridges	Mike	Episode: "End Game"
2001–02	The Zeta Project	Slam	Voice, 2 episodes
2002	NYPD Blue	Eric Clifton	Episode: "Oedipus Wrecked"
2003	Six Feet Under	Zach	Episode: "The Eye Inside"
2004	Static Shock	Jokerz Gang Member	Voice, episode: "Future Shock"
2004	Stargate SG-1	Ronan	Episode: "Lost City: Part 2"
2004	10.5	Earl	Miniseries
2004	Bleach	Yasutora Sado	Voice, English dub
2004	Teen Titans	Killer Moth	Voice, episode: "Can I Keep Him?"
2005	Star Trek: Enterprise	Klingon Prisoner	Episode: "Affliction"
2005	Justice League Unlimited	Future Parasite	Voice, episode: "Epilogue"
2007–08	According to Jim	Stew, Maitre'D	2 episodes
2008	Life	Ice Cream Guy	Episode: "Find Your Happy Place"
2008	Dirty Sexy Money	D.J. Pillowhead	Episode: "The Summer House"
2008–11	Batman: The Brave and the Bold	Kanjar Ro	Voice, 3 episodes
2009	Big Love	Flower Shop Boy	Episode: "Rough Edges"
2009	Saving Grace	Hunter Wilson	Episode: "I Believe in Angels"
2010	The Mentalist	Howie Dressler	Episode: "Pink Chanel Suit"
2012	CSI: NY	Declan Callahan	Episode: "Sláinte"
2013	Malibu Country	Dallas	Episode: "Bowling for Mama"
2014	Cosmos: A Spacetime Odyssey	Harrison Brown	Voice, episode: "The Clean Room"
2017	Be Cool, Scooby-Doo!	Houndbeast	Voice, episode: "Worst in Show"

=== Video games ===
Year	Title	Role	Notes
1997	Blade Runner	Baker	
2000	Combat Flight Simulator 2	Additional Voices	
2001	Command & Conquer: Yuri's Revenge	Additional Voices	
2001	Jak and Daxter: The Precursor Legacy	Warrior	
2005	Guild Wars	Svanir	
2006	Full Spectrum Warrior: Ten Hammers	Additional Voices	
2007	Bleach: Dark Souls	Additional Voices	
2007	God of War II	Jason's Guard	
2008	The Rise of the Argonauts	Additional Voices	
2009	Halo Wars	Brute Chieftain	
2010	Vanquish	Victor Zaitsev	
2011	Final Fantasy XIII-2	Additional Voices	English voices
2012	Diablo III	Additional Voices	
2012	Call of Duty: Black Ops II	Additional Voices	
2013	God of War: Ascension	Sailor	
2013	Marvel Heroes	Iron Man, Punisher, Thanos	
2013	Grand Theft Auto V	Additional Voices	
2013	Skylanders: Swap Force	Trap Shadow	
2014	Skylanders: Trap Team	Trap Shadow	
2014	Lego Batman 3: Beyond Gotham	Sinestro	
2015	Final Fantasy Type-0 HD	Zhuyu	
2015	Infinite Crisis	Sinestro	
2015	Batman: Arkham Knight	Deacon Blackfire	
2015	Skylanders: SuperChargers	Trap Shadow	
2015	StarCraft II: Legacy of the Void	Trooper	
2016	Lego Star Wars: The Force Awakens	Additional Voices	
2017	Agents of Mayhem	MAYHEM Crewmember	
2018	Lego DC Super-Villains	Sinestro, Arkham PA	
2018	Red Dead Redemption 2	Additional Voices	
