= Kendermore =

Fantasy novel in the Dragonlance series

- 2003 paperback edition cover
- Author: Mary Kirchoff
- Cover artist: Mark Zug
- Language: English
- Series: Dragonlance: Preludes
- Genre: Fantasy novel
- Publisher: Wizards of the Coast
- Publication date: November 30, 1989
- Publication place: United States
- Media type: Print (Paperback)
- Pages: 352 pp
- ISBN: 0-7869-2947-2
- OCLC: 51949936
- LC Class: CPB Box no. 2270 vol. 8
- Preceded by: Darkness and Light
- Followed by: Brothers Majere

Kendermore is a fantasy novel in the Dragonlance series. Originally published in 1989, Kendermore was written by Mary Kirchoff and is volume two of The Preludes subseries of the Dragonlance saga. It has also been reprinted in April 2003.

== Synopsis ==
Kendermore is a novel in which Tasslehoff Burrfoot is accused of violating the prearranged marriage laws for kender, and forced to return to Kendermore due to the imprisonment of his Uncle Trapspringer.

== Plot summary ==
The novel begins with the character of Tasslehoff Burrfoot at the Inn of the Last Home with his friends. However, soon a bounty hunter arrives and charges him with desertion for violating the laws of prearranged marriage. A journey east turns into a voyage with gully dwarves.

Meanwhile in Kendermore, Tas's Uncle Trapspringer and a human "doctor" have found a map leading to a treasure. Tas is having his own adventures after a shipwreck strands him, Gisella (the bounty hunter), and Woodrow (Gisella's assistant) near a dwarven settlement. Tas is captured by gnomes, who seek to turn him into an exhibit. Woodrow saves him with help from Winnie, a wooly mammoth. Gisella is killed by Denzil, an assassin. Tas and Woodrow arrive in Kendermore. In the ruins east of the city, "Dr." Phineas Curick, Uncle Trapspringer, and Damaris (the one intended to marry Tasslehoff) find themselves being entertained by Vincent, a rare ogre who is good! The kender and human wander into a magical portal which takes them to Gelfigburg, a Candyland like place. They also discover that the treasure (a magical amulet) has been used up. Denzil, not knowing this, forces Tas to take him to the ruins. Tas tries to go into the portal, but Denzil pulls him out before he is all the way through, leaving Tas stuck in the portal. The kender in Gelfigburg attempt to pull Tas through, leading to a tug of war. Vincent pulls Tas, Damaris, Trapspringer, Phineas, and all the Kender out of Gelfigburg. Denzil is trapped inside. The Dark Queen attempts to enter, but Damaris closes the portal. The kender return to Kendermore, saving the city from a storm. Tas is reunified with Woodrow, and Damaris marries Trapspringer.

== Continuity errors ==
- In the book, it says that Flint Fireforge is a mountain dwarf. However, Flint is a hill dwarf who hates the mountain dwarves.
- Denzil is described as a half-orc, while orcs do not exist in the Dragonlance continuity.
- The novel mentions the remains of a werewolf. Lycanthropes do not exist on Krynn.

== Reviews ==
- Review by Scott Winnett (1989) in Locus, #345 October 1989
- Review by John Gilbert (1990) in Fear, February 1990
- Review by Jessica Yates (1990) in Paperback Inferno, #83
