= Wizards and Rogues of the Realms =

Accessory book for Dungeons & Dragons

- Genre: Role-playing games
- Publisher: TSR
- Publication date: 1995

Wizards and Rogues of the Realms is an accessory for the 2nd edition of the Advanced Dungeons & Dragons fantasy role-playing game, published in 1995.

== Contents ==
Wizards and Rogues of the Realms features character class kits for wizards and rogues of the Forgotten Realms campaign setting. The book also introduces two new Shadow Walkers and Spellsingers character classes. A Spellsinger is a magic user with instantaneous access to nearly all available spells at first level, and casts spells by singing and dancing so that casting takes longer and has a chance of spell failure. A Shadow Walker is similar to a thief but with a limited ability of magic use. Each kit includes an overview of home area for the character and describes the clothing native to each area, guidelines for roleplaying, and special abilities and disadvantages for the kit, as well as statistics for racial and ability requirements, and also proficiencies.

== Publication history ==
Wizards and Rogues of the Realms was designed by William W. Connors, and published by TSR in 1995. The interior artists were Ned Dameron and Valarie Valusek.

Shannon Appelcline commented that among other changes to the Forgotten Realms publications in the 1990s, there were "a number of more player-oriented books — doubtless intended to sell like the PHBR volumes. Some of these volumes, like Wizards and Rogues of the Realms (1995) and Warriors and Priests of the Realms (1996) even shared the same trade dress."

== Reception ==
Cliff Ramshaw reviewed Wizards and Rogues of the Realms for Arcane magazine, rating it a 5 out of 10 overall. He criticized that adjustments to character mechanics were "generally no more than tweaks, and as such are a little uninspiring", with a few exceptions including "wizards that cast offensive spells at two levels beyond their ability, and wizards that gain intelligence-determined spell bonuses in the way that clerics gain wisdom bonuses". Ramshaw concluded the review: "The book suggests that players should choose kits for their roleplaying potential rather than for any extra power they may yield. Better yet, players could instead consult the Skills & Powers tome and customise the backgrounds, personalities and abilities of their characters as they see fit."

== Reviews ==
- Dragon #229
- Casus Belli #92
