= Caramon Majere =

- Dragonlance character
- Caramon and Raistlin Majere, by Larry Elmore.
- First appearance: Dragon #83: short story "The Test of the Twins" by Margaret Weis (March 1984)
- Created by: Margaret Weis
- Voiced by: Rino Romano (2008 animated film)

In-universe information
- Race: Civilized human
- Gender: Male
- Class: Fighter
- Home: Solace

Caramon Majere (326 AC - 38 SC) is a fictional character from the Dragonlance books. He is depicted as a fighter and is one of the main characters in Margaret Weis and Tracy Hickman's first Dragonlance trilogy, the Dragonlance Chronicles. Caramon and his brother Raistlin Majere's relationship was explored in the NY Times Best Seller Twins Trilogy.

== Publication history ==
Dragon magazine published a series of stories introducing members of the Heroes of the Lance, to preview Dragonlance; the first of these was "The Test of the Twins" in Dragon #83 (March 1984), a story featuring twin brothers Raistlin and Caramon.

== Character profile ==
Caramon Majere was created by Margaret Weis and Tracy Hickman as one of several characters to be involved in an epic Advanced Dungeons & Dragons campaign which they had written and designed.

Raistlin Majere harbors a secret hate for his twin's physical power and easygoing manner, and for the attention and comradeship it seems to earn him, as Raistlin's own appearance and secretive nature causes others to be mistrustful and apprehensive. Caramon, conversely, holds Raistlin in high regard and tries to protect him.

== Early life ==
Caramon is the son of Gilon Majere and Rosamun Aelan Uth Matar, twin brother to Raistlin Majere, and half-brother to Kitiara Uth Matar.

The son of a woodcutter, Caramon's childhood was a complicated one. Caramon (the first born), was strapping and healthy, while Raistlin was so sickly that the midwife feared he would die as an infant. Raistlin had to be nursed to health continuously by their half-sister, Kitiara. From an early age, Caramon's deliberate way of considering ideas earned him a reputation for mental dullness. His father, Gilon, died in an accident when Caramon was only sixteen years old. Soon after, his mother, Rosamun, went into a delusional trance and never came out.

The novel Brothers Majere by Rose Estes explores how the love/hate relationship began between Caramon and Raistlin when Caramon allowed his mother to die to end her suffering from an illness. Caramon met Sturm Brightblade in his early teens; they did not get off to a good start. The two got into a fight because Sturm insulted Raistlin. Tasslehoff Burrfoot discovered the young boys and decided to "adopt" them. This is how Caramon met Flint Fireforge and Tanis Half-Elven. The six companions (seven with Kitiara) went on many treks as an entourage to Flint's business. Soon, though, the companions decided to separate to find some truth to the rumors of war. Raistlin had other plans.

Raistlin was to undergo the Test of High Sorcery and Caramon accompanied him on this trip. During the Test, Raistlin killed an illusion of his twin, which Caramon witnessed. Their relationship has been strained since. The five years following this, the two brothers became mercenaries to learn how to combine magic and steel effectively and became a very lethal team in battle.

Caramon was the strongest of the Heroes of the Lance, and a fearsome warrior. He is over 6 ft. tall and massively built. He was trained in a battle craft by his half-sister Kitiara, who later became a Dragon Highlord in Takhisis' dragonarmies. Although they were complete opposites, Caramon was never far from his twin Raistlin. Much of Caramon's experience in combat came from dealing with the charlatans and fakes whom Raistlin delighted in exposing and humiliating.

== War of the Lance and beyond ==
Caramon was one of the heroes who brought the War of the Lance to an end and was instrumental in the defeat of Takhisis and her Dragonarmies. He helped to defeat the evil dragon Khisanth in Xak Tsaroth and to free the slaves captured by Verminaard of Nidus in Pax Tharkas. He shared in the dream that all the Heroes of the Lance endured when several of the heroes (including Caramon) entered the realm of Silvanesti and found themselves trapped in the nightmare of Lorac, Speaker of the Stars.

Caramon was also a participant in the final battle at the Queen's temple in Neraka when she was finally banished from Krynn. After the battle was won, Caramon was confronted by his brother Raistlin, who had now turned to the Black Robes. Caramon offered to walk the path of evil with his brother, but Raistlin refused, and left Caramon alone for the first time in his life. Despite this, Caramon remains loyal to his brother, with a willingness to provide aid at any time.

=== Legends Trilogy ===
Time of the Twins, the first novel in the series, features a self-contained narrative detailing the fall of Caramon and his redemption. He has become an alcoholic in the two years since the end of the first trilogy, and while Tasslehoff nudges Caramon into going after Raistlin, Caramon's gradual recovery is entirely his own achievement.

After the War of the Lance was finished, Caramon married Tika Waylan and settled down to a quiet life in the town called Solace. However, without his brother, Caramon did not feel whole. At one point, Caramon wrote a heart-felt letter to his brother, which was returned to Caramon unopened, with the words "I have no brother" written on the outside of the envelope/scroll casing. Heartbroken, he soon turned to drinking to fill the emptiness. He becomes an overweight alcoholic and an embarrassment to his wife. His journey to redemption began when Caramon time travelled to the past with the cleric, Lady Crysania and Tasslehoff Burrfoot to the city of Istar on a mission to reclaim Raistlin from evil. Caramon became a gladiator in the Istarian arena and became the man he had once been, physically if not yet emotionally. Caramon then travelled forward in time one hundred years with Crysania and Raistlin (masquerading as Fistandantilus) to participate in the Dwarfgate Wars in War of the Twins.

Using a magical device, Caramon and Tasslehoff escaped that time period before a magical explosion could kill them and accidentally found themselves in an alternate future where Raistlin had succeeded in becoming a god, but had destroyed all life in the process. Caramon and Tasslehoff returned to the present at last where Caramon confronted his brother in the Abyss and told him what the future would be if his plans came to fruition. Raistlin realized his own mistake, and sacrificed his own life to correct his mistake and win his soul's peace. Caramon escaped with Crysania back into the real world, having finally found the peace he sought.

=== War of Souls ===
After his long journey, Caramon returned to Solace to be with his wife. Together, they had five children: Sturm Majere, Tanin Majere, Palin Majere, Laura Majere and Dezra Majere. Caramon also later became a grandfather to Ulin Majere and Linsha Majere, son and daughter of his son Palin.

In the story "Kitiara's Son" by Margaret Weis and Tracy Hickman, Caramon is visited in the night by a blue dragon-rider named Sara Dunstan who is the adoptive mother of Steel Brightblade, the son of Sturm and Kitiara (making him Caramon's half-nephew.) She begs Caramon to help turn Steel from evil before he becomes a full-fledged Knight of Takhisis. Together with Tanis Half-Elven, they kidnap Steel and tell him the truth about his father and his heroic sacrifice in the High Clerist's Tower on behalf of the Knights of Solamnia and the world at large. Although Steel is not dissuaded from joining the evil Knights, this experience indelibly changes him. He appears in a new adventure, "Dezra's Quest" Released later in 2000, with his daughter Dezra Majere. He dies in the year 38 SC after a heart attack upon the stairs of the Inn of the Last Home, hoping to see his brother. Tasslehoff Burrfoot had traveled forward in time to an alternate timeline to speak at Caramon's funeral, and told him that many people would be there and things were different. His soul joins the River of Souls where he is, at long last, reunited with his brother after Takhisis is defeated in the War of the Souls trilogy.

== Family tree ==
Caramon Majere (Elder) | Unknown Woman
Gilon Majere | Rosamun | Gregor Uth Matar
Tika Waylan | Caramon | Raistlin | Kitiara Uth Matar | Sturm Brightblade
Tanin | Palin | Usha | Laura | Steel Brightblade
Sturm | Ulin | Linsha | Dezra

== Other media ==
=== Video games ===
Caramon appears as one of the player characters in Advanced Dungeons & Dragons: Heroes of the Lance.

Caramon also appears in Champions of Krynn.

=== Miniature figures ===
Caramon was included in Ral Partha's Dragonlance Heroes boxed figures set of lead miniatures. A reviewer for Dragon magazine felt that Ral Partha successfully matched their figures to the descriptions of the characters in the novels, and described his figure: "Caramon is leaning forward aggressively, as if fighting. He wields a long sword in his left hand with a shield on his right arm. A plate-mail suit covers his entire body, except for his full-length boots. His tunic, worn under his shoulder plates, flows naturally. The simple belts and buckles are clearly visible. Caramon wears a winged helmet, and his face bears a look of grim determination."

A second miniature of Caramon was released, this time on an individual blister pack, under Ral Partha's "Personalities" line.

=== Dragonlance movie ===
Rino Romano voiced Caramon Majere in the animated movie Dragonlance: Dragons of Autumn Twilight. The 2002 winner of the American Library Association's Alex Award Mel Odom reviewed the film and stated "Caramon is simple-minded and protective of Raistlin" without further characterisation although stating the movie was a "lot of fun".

== Reception ==
The character was popular enough for Margaret Weis and Tracy Hickman to base the Twins Trilogy around Caramon's and Raistlin's relationship. The final book of the trilogy Test of the Twins appeared on the New York Times bestseller list for several weeks in 1986. Ian Hewitt, a staff reviewer from d20zines.com stated focus of the trilogy was "Caramon's heart-wrenching quest to save his brother if he can, but to ultimately stop him at any cost is the test that the twins must face" and awarded Test of the Twins an A+ rating. In Religious Concepts in Fantasy Literature, Nadine Wolf wrote that while Caramon is the physically stronger twin compared to Raistlin, it is the latter who "dominates their relationship". This is equivalent to what studies of real life twins has shown happens.

Jason Heller, of The A.V. Club, calls the twin brothers Caramon and Raistlin "the series most compelling characters" and writes that "Caramon is a large, powerful, goodhearted, slightly childlike warrior; Raistlin is a sickly, complicated, mysterious, morally iffy magician. The dynamic feels like it's lifted straight from Thor and Loki, and that archetypal resonance is what Weis and Hickman are obviously shooting for. And almost entirely hit."

Lauren Davis of io9 notes that while "Caramon is physically strong, but has invested so much of his life and identity in protecting brother that he's blind to Raistlin's growing darkness." Davis notes the flaws of the main characters, commenting that Caramon "isn't sure who he is without his brother—even in a crowded field of characters. That's what lets us weep over doomed characters, shake our heads at foolish ones, rally at moments of true bravery and growth, and sigh over star-crossed lovers. Weis and Hickman may stuff their books with all a sorts of magical creatures and artifacts, but they clearly love their characters and never forget that it's the human(ish) stories that form the series' heart."

In the Io9 series revisiting older Dungeons & Dragons novels, Rob Bricken commented that "Raistlin's twin brother. He's strong, beefy, and not particularly bright. He does love Raistlin unequivocally, which is good because no one else does."

== Bibliography ==
- Weis, Margaret (March 1984). "The test of the twins". Dragon #83. Vol. VIII, no. 9. TSR. pp. 26–30.
- Weis, Margaret; Hickman, Tracy (2000). Dragons of Autumn Twilight: Chronicles vol. I. Wizards of the Coast. ISBN 0-7869-1574-9.
- Weis, Margaret; Hickman, Tracy (2000). Dragons of Winter Night: Chronicles vol. II. Wizards of the Coast. ISBN 0-7869-1609-5.
- Weis, Margaret; Hickman, Tracy (2000). Dragons of Spring Dawning: Chronicles vol. III. Wizards of the Coast. ISBN 0-7869-1589-7.
- Weis, Margaret; Hickman, Tracy (2000). Time of the Twins: Legends vol. I. Wizards of the Coast. ISBN 0-7869-1804-7.
- Weis, Margaret; Hickman, Tracy (2000). War of the Twins: Legends vol. II. Wizards of the Coast. ISBN 0-7869-1805-5.
- Weis, Margaret; Hickman, Tracy (2000). Test of the Twins: Legends vol. III. Wizards of the Coast. ISBN 0-7869-1806-3.
- Weis, Margaret; Hickman, Tracy (2002). The Second Generation. Wizards of the Coast. ISBN 0-7869-2694-5.
- Weis, Margaret (2003). The Soulforge: Raistlin Chronicles vol. I. Wizards of the Coast. ISBN 0-7869-1314-2.
- Weis, Margaret; Perrin, Don (2000). Brothers in Arms: Raistlin Chronicles vol. II. Wizards of the Coast. ISBN 0-7869-1429-7.
- Weis, Margaret; Hickman, Tracy (2003). Dragons of a Fallen Sun: The War of Souls vol. I. Wizards of the Coast. ISBN 0-7869-1807-1.
- Rathmayr, Reinhard (2010). Zwillinge in der Griechisch-Römischen Antike (in German). Böhlau Verlag Wien. ISBN 978-3205992035.
- Stein, Kevin (2000). Brothers Majere: Preludes vol. III. Wizards of the Coast. ISBN 0-7869-2971-5.
- Wolf, Nadine (2010). Religious Concepts in Fantasy Literature. GRIN Verlag. ISBN 978-3640661428.
