= Rary the Traitor =

Dungeons & Dragons adventure

- Code: WGR3
- TSR product code: 9386
- Rules required: 2nd Ed AD&D
- Character levels: All / 8+
- Campaign setting: Greyhawk
- Authors: Anthony Prior
- First published: 1992

Rary the Traitor is a Dungeons & Dragons sourcebook and module for the World of Greyhawk campaign setting.

== Plot summary ==
The work details the empire of the renegade archmage Rary, known as the Empire of the Bright Lands. Historical background of the Bright Desert is also covered, and introduced the ancient Flan nations of Sulm and Itar to the setting. Information on Robilar, Rary's co-conspirator, is also provided.

The information in the sourcebook section of the publication can be used in campaigns involving characters of all levels, however the adventures contained in the module are designed for characters of levels eight or higher.

== Publication history ==
Rary the Traitor was written by Anthony Pryor and released by TSR in 1992.

== Reception ==
Keith H. Eisenbeis reviewed the module in the March/April issue of White Wolf magazine, and stated that "If one can overlook the obvious incongruities and fairly simplistic short dungeons at the end, this product provides a nicely fleshed out geographic area for adventuring opportunities. In this sense it is a good resource for those DMs running campaigns in the World of Greyhawk setting. In all other senses, however, it is substantially lacking." He rated it as a 2 out of a possible 5.
