= Tasslehoff Burrfoot =

- Dragonlance character
- Fizban and Tasslehoff
- First appearance: "A Stone's Throw Away" by Roger E. Moore, Dragon magazine #85 (May 1984)
- Created by: Margaret Weis and Tracy Hickman
- Voiced by: Jason Marsden (2008 animated film)

In-universe information
- Alias: Tas
- Race: Kender
- Gender: Male
- Class: Rogue
- Home: Kendermore

Tasslehoff Burrfoot (often called Tas) is a fictional character of the kender race from the Dragonlance series of novels, written by Margaret Weis and Tracy Hickman. He was born in Kendermore. His parents are unknown and he has few known relatives. He has a sister, and also claims (like many other kender) to have an Uncle Trapspringer. He has three uncles, by the names of Remo Lockpick, Bertie, and Wilfre. He also has a cousin, Latchlifter Furrfoot.

== Publication history ==
Dragon magazine published a series of stories introducing members of the Heroes of the Lance, to preview Dragonlance; "A Stone's Throw Away" in Dragon #85 (May 1984) was the second of these, and is a story about Tasslehoff.

In the novel Kendermore, Tasslehoff is "collared by a lady bounty hunter and charged with violating the kender laws of prearranged marriage. To ensure his return, Kendermore's council has his Uncle Trapspringer in prison. Tas meets the last woolly mammoth and an alchemist who wants to pickle one of everything, including one kender. What no one knows is that the Dark Queen is inciting the riots in Kendermore as part of her plan for the battle of good versus evil."

== Early life ==
Tasslehoff developed a passion for maps early on. He collected them and posted them all over the walls of his room. However, when he drew maps, his short patience led him to draw them inaccurately and make up names for certain places on Ansalon. While he often stole things, he always claimed he wasn't a thief, often saying he was just borrowing the objects in question. This is a behaviour typical to kender, who as a species steadfastly, and with some indignation, maintain they do not steal, but "find" things that "just happen" to have been left out, or fallen into their pouches.

He traveled to Solace and found a ring dropped by a thief, which he dubbed "Tas's Ring of Teleportation". With this ring, he traveled all across Krynn, ending up at Magus's Tower where he aided Demogorgon in an attempt to stop Magus from using demons. When he departed, he left Magus in the care of the Prince of Demons.

During Tas's travels outside of Solace, he encountered Tanis Half-Elven and Flint Fireforge. He asked to be their friends; they declined. Tas, upon leaving Solace, acquired a bracelet that Flint made for Selena Sonluanaau. This bracelet saved Tas from a spider, and a merchant as well. When Tanis and Flint came to collect the bracelet Tas no longer had it. Selena arrived and charged them with finding the bracelet. They set off immediately, but were waylaid by satyrs, who made them stop, dance, and drink while the satyrs played music for a whole day. Upon arriving in Tantallon, Flint and Tanis were captured by the local Lord. Selena and Tas took a polymorph potion that turned them into birds to get into the castle, then they became mice to retrieve the bracelet. They freed Tanis and Flint, the bracelet was returned to Selena, and Tas left with Flint and Tanis.

Tasslehoff then joined the remaining Companions and they began adventuring. Flint nearly drowned at one point, and Tas helped to get him ashore. When Tas was on a quest for a special herb that Raistlin needed, along with Sturm and Caramon, he was captured by minotaurs.

Tasslehoff also appeared in the Legends Trilogy as a character to retrieve Caramon from his drunken stupor.

== Back to Kendermore ==
When the companions separated, Tas had no intention of leaving his friends but a bounty hunter (who was a beautiful dwarven woman, and was later killed by the half-orc Denzil) came to arrest him and bring him back to Kendermore. She did this because he had to marry a kender named Damaris Metwinger (who was the mayor's daughter). His journey to Kendermore was forced upon him, by saying that his Uncle Trapspringer was arrested until Tas will come and marry. On the way Tas was kidnapped by two Gnomes, whose Life-Quest was to stuff one of every creature alive. He was rescued by a Woolly Mammoth he released (this later prompted endless stories he told to the other Heroes of the Lance, whether they wanted to hear them or not). He was then kidnapped by a half-orc named Denzil, who needed a map of Tas' to find a treasure located in The Ruins. The Ruins were the remnants of a city lost during the time of the Cataclysm, located just outside the kender city, Kendermore. When Tas reached The Ruins, he was captured by a friendly ogre. The ogre's lair was underneath one of the abandoned Towers of High Sorcery. In the Tower of High Sorcery he entered a dimension. The dimension where his Uncle Trapspringer and Damaris were on that anything and everything was edible. They escaped, along with the other kender caught there. Takhisis, finding an open portal, tried to enter the world, but they closed the portal before she could enter. In revenge, she asked her son, Nuitari, the god of dark magic, to cause natural disasters on Kendermore. When Tas and the rest of the kenders saved from the alternate dimension arrived in Kendermore, it was burning. However, thanks to Tas' leadership, they extinguished the fire. At the end Damaris decided to marry Trapspringer, thus freeing Tas from his obligation.

== War of the Lance ==
Tasslehoff helps his companions on many occasions during the war, mainly through his fearlessness and curiosity. While normally a nuisance, these qualities often help the Companions as well. Tasslehoff takes his part in the war by riding a dragon with Flint during one of the final battles. He is delighted at the chance of flying dragons and get excited easily, even in dangerous and deadly situations. During the War of the Lance, Tasslehoff has numerous near-death experiences. In a draconian army encampment, he nearly dies in a burning wicker dragon. In the city of Tarsis the Beautiful, he nearly dies when a burning building falls on him. In the Temple of the Dark Queen in Neraka, Tasslehoff is poisoned by a trap sprung by a picked lock. He is later healed by Raistlin Majere.

Paladine, leader of the white pantheon of gods in Dragonlance and brother to Takhisis, becomes mortal and takes the form of a wizard named Fizban, who is very fond of kenders in general and Tasslehoff in particular, with the two developing a father and son relationship.

== After the war ==
After the war Tasslehoff splits up with the other Companions of the Lance, with the intention of going back to Kendermore. He went on to tell them the tale of how the kender killed a Dragon Highlord named Fewmaster Toede. Before leaving he told the companions that kenders would go down in Krynnish lore. The companions had to refrain from telling Tas that Fewmaster Toede was a hobgoblin with little more intelligence than a Gully Dwarf.

== Legends ==
Tasslehoff was sent by Tika Majere to help Caramon escort a cleric of Paladine, Crysania to the tower of High Sorcery. Anxious to keep his promise to protect Caramon and not miss out on any adventures, Tasslehoff, having been transformed into a mouse, manages to sneak into the laboratory of the great Par Salian, leader of the white robed magicians of Good, as he is casting the time traveling spell. Tasslehoff runs into the middle of the spell and gets transported back in time with Caramon. Since the creation of Kender was accidental, Kender possessed the ability to alter the flow of time. Through Tasslehoff's interference, Raistlin (as Fistandantilus) is able to change the past and successfully enter the Abyss to challenge Takhisis along with the Paladine cleric Crysania. Caramon and Tas, traveling back in time, end up in 358 instead of 356, discovering an alternate time line in which Raistlin has become a god, and the world is going to end. Armed with this knowledge, they go back in time again to 356, planning to stop Raistlin. Caramon orders Tas to save Tanis. Tas, knowing that Caramon will die if he tries to enters the Shoikan Grove, saves Tanis, and with his help, Tas saves Caramon. He then helps them when they capture the Flying Citadel, and controls it until the end of the war, when he gives it to Rounce. After hearing Crysania's eulogy for Elistan, he leaves to Tanis' castle with Tanis and Caramon.

== Chaos War ==
In order to force Chaos to part or remain on Krynn, the gods needed Chaos' blood, and so, at the end of the Chaos War Tasslehoff insulted Chaos, making the deity careless. Tasslehoff then ran up and stabbed Chaos in his big toe with a magical knife Caramon Majere had dubbed "Rabbitslayer". The resulting spurt of blood was enough of Chaos' essence to be used to force the deity into a choice—stay in the world and be forced to continually control himself (which Chaos had little patience for), or leave. Chaos decided to leave, but while he was leaving, he stomped on Tasslehoff, seemingly killing him, but leaving his items.

== War of Souls ==
Before Tasslehoff was killed by Chaos, he used the magical time traveling device to go forward in time to speak at Caramon's funeral. The first time he attempted to attend the funeral, he arrived too late. On another attempt at arriving at the correct time, he managed to speak briefly. After this event, Tasslehoff went back, unintentionally, to a different time and participated in the War of Souls. There he met the knight Gerard, and the two embarked on a journey to Qualinesti to find the mage Palin Majere before separating. The third timeline he ever entered was the only one in which the Great Dragons reached Ansalon. By simply existing in this timeline that wasn't his own he was a danger to Takhisis. He was proof that her power wasn't absolute and inspired some individuals. Moreover, if he was slain in a time not his own, the result would be oblivion. Thus, he was unsuccessfully hunted by the Dark Knight, Mina. He was trapped for a time in the tower of high sorcery with the mages Palin and Dalamar, both of which wanted to send him back to die by using the Device of Time Journeying. However, the device had been broken earlier. Since he did not want to die, he fled with the device, which was later fixed by the gnome Conundrum. He traveled through several various times throughout history before he returned to the war of souls. Shortly after, he helped Gerard, Odila, and Mirror to free the metallic dragons from their prison. After this he agreed to go back in time and get stepped on by Chaos, as he was supposed to, thus returning to his normal time-stream. As he was leaving, he reminded Gerard that the lock on his tomb (which he had picklocked), was broken and needed repair.

Coincidentally, many kender claim to have an Uncle Tas during the Fifth Age.

== Personality ==
Tas, like all kender of the Dragonlance series, could be compared to a 5-year-old child; he is utterly irresponsible in any task that is not of the utmost importance, and often takes things that do not belong to him, which to a kender is "borrowing" and not stealing. Kender do not consider themselves to be thieves, and can become quite indignant when accused of stealing. They believe in sharing all that they have, and a common custom between two kender is to dump the entire contents of their pouches and exchange things. To kender, a family heirloom is something that has been in their possession for more than three weeks.

Kender also have a trait called "Taunting", by insulting their opponents to the point of enraging them to killing intent, and thus lowering their accuracy in attacking but increasing their strength as a result. This is especially shown during Chronicles Book 2: Dragons of Winter Night when the companions were tied up and escorted to the mayor and while walking the street under the jeering of the crowd, Tas, as the master of taunting, managed to enrage the crowd into a riot and managed to be saved by the knights on covert mission in the chaos.

Like all kender, Tas hated being bored, and on the occasion that he was, he was known to begin talking about meaningless things to anyone who would listen.

Like all kender, Tas is completely without fear for himself. However, Tas is different from other kender in that he does know fear, not for himself, but for the people that he cares about. He is even immune to dragonfear, except that caused by the great dragons of the fourth age, but the Shoikan Grove's piercing aura of fear managed to break through and affect him, though he did not recognize the feeling. The Death Knight, Lord Soth, gave him the same feeling. He is also fiercely loyal to his friends, has enough sense (largely thanks to lecturing from Tanis Half-Elven) to avoid overly dangerous situations, and above all, has a conscience in the form of Flint Fireforge's voice.

Displays of this fear can be found in the books:
Chronicles Trilogy
Dragons of Autumn Twilight
Dragons of Winter Night
Dragons of Spring Dawning
Dragons of Summer Flame

War of Souls Trilogy
Dragons of a Fallen Sun
Dragons of a Lost Star
Dragons of a Vanished Moon

== Appearance ==
Tasslehoff is often described as resembling a twelve-year-old child; he is of that general height and build. His face has many wrinkles that appear whenever he smiles, which is often. His clothes are always described as colorful, comfortable, and utterly unmatching. His most famous article of clothing was his fur-lined vest, worn through much of the War of Lance. Like all of his race, he carries a good number of pouches, which he never takes off, except just prior to his death at the hands of Chaos, so that he could run faster. See Chaos War. Also like all of his race, he has a ludicrously large topknot, which is to a kender what a beard is to a dwarf. His hair is brown as are his eyes. He also embodies the statement in many of the novels, the two most dangerous things in all of Krynn is to hear a Kender say "oops" and "I'm bored.".

== Other media ==
=== Video games ===
Tasslehoff appears as one of the player characters in Advanced Dungeons & Dragons: Heroes of the Lance.

Tasslehoff also appears as a player character in Dragons of Flame, where one reviewer describes him as "a rather fat mamma with ginormous ears".

=== Miniature figures ===
Tasslehoff was included in Ral Partha's Dragonlance Heroes boxed figures set of lead miniatures. A reviewer for Dragon magazine felt that Ral Partha successfully matched their figures to the descriptions of the characters in the novels, and described his figure: "Tasslehoff stands at the ready, with a sling in his left hand and a rock in his right. He is clothed in simple pants and buckle boots, and is wearing a sleeveless fur coat. His face has a look of foreboding. His hair is pulled back into a topknot that flows down his back. He is also carrying water containers and provisions on his belt."

=== Dragonlance movie ===
Jason Marsden voiced Tasslehoff in the animated movie Dragonlance: Dragons of Autumn Twilight. The 2002 winner of the American Library Association's Alex Award Mel Odom reviewed the film and described Tasslehoff as "a kleptomaniac".

== Reception ==
Jason Heller, of The A.V. Club, notes that Tasslehoff, "the group's token member of the hobbit-like kender race, winds up being a source of real pathos after a rocky start as a kleptomaniac punchline."

Lauren Davis of io9 describes Tasslehoff as "endlessly resourceful and his tendency to steal any small object in sight proves more useful than annoying. Plus, his cheerful demeanor is often a welcome ray of light in the books' darker moments, though his gradual journey to maturity is one of the series' most satisfying arcs—and the reason he becomes such a heroic figure in later volumes."

In the Io9 series revisiting older Dungeons & Dragons novels, Rob Bricken commented that "A kender, a race particular to the Dragonlance setting that are hobbit-sized but not interested in creature comforts and Elevensies. Instead, they're innately curious, playful to the occasional point of meanness, and generally so happy-go-lucky they genuinely don't feel fear. They're also uniformly kleptomaniacs."

== Bibliography ==
- Margaret Weis; Tracy Hickman (2000). Dragons of Autumn Twilight: Chronicles vol. I. Wizards of the Coast. ISBN 0-7869-1574-9.
- Margaret Weis; Tracy Hickman (2000). Dragons of Winter Night: Chronicles vol. II. Wizards of the Coast. ISBN 0-7869-1609-5.
- Margaret Weis; Tracy Hickman (2000). Dragons of Spring Dawning: Chronicles vol. III. Wizards of the Coast. ISBN 0-7869-1589-7.
- Margaret Weis; Tracy Hickman (2000). Time of the Twins: Legends vol. I. Wizards of the Coast. ISBN 0-7869-1804-7.
- Margaret Weis; Tracy Hickman (2000). War of the Twins: Legends vol. II. Wizards of the Coast. ISBN 0-7869-1805-5.
- Margaret Weis; Tracy Hickman (2000). Test of the Twins: Legends vol. III. Wizards of the Coast. ISBN 0-7869-1806-3.
- Margaret Weis; Tracy Hickman (2002). Dragons of Summer Flame. Wizards of the Coast. ISBN 0-7869-2708-9.
- Margaret Weis; Tracy Hickman (2003). Dragons of a Fallen Sun: The War of Souls vol. I. Wizards of the Coast. ISBN 0-7869-1807-1.
- Margaret Weis; Tracy Hickman (2002). Dragons of a Lost Star: The War of Souls vol. II. Wizards of the Coast. ISBN 0-7869-2706-2.
- Margaret Weis; Tracy Hickman (2003). Dragons of a Vanished Moon: The War of Souls vol. III. Wizards of the Coast. ISBN 0-7869-2950-2.
- Mary Kirchoff; Steve Winter (1991). Wanderlust: The Meetings Sextet vol. II. TSR. ISBN 1-56076-115-6.
- Kirchoff, Mary (2003). Kendermore: Preludes vol. II. Wizards of the Coast. ISBN 0-7869-2947-2.
- Wolf, Nadine (2010). Religious Concepts in Fantasy Literature. GRIN Verlag. ISBN 978-3640661428.
