= Flint Fireforge =

- Dragonlance character
- Flint (bottom left) with Sturm Brightblade
- First appearance: Dragons of Autumn Twilight (1984)
- Created by: Margaret Weis and Tracy Hickman
- Voiced by: Fred Tatasciore (2008 animated film)

In-universe information
- Race: Hill dwarf
- Gender: Male
- Class: Fighter
- Home: Hillhome

Flint Fireforge is a fictional dwarf character appearing in the Dragonlance series of books. The dwarf Flint Fireforge is one of the six Heroes of the Lance. He is the second of thirteen children. He was born and lived in (for a time) the village of Hillhome. His ancient ancestor was Reghar Fireforge, a renowned dwarf. His parents' names are not known, but they are referred to as Mama and Father by Flint.

== Publication history ==
Flint dies in the third book of the Chronicles series. Paladine, in the guise of Fizban, takes him to Reorx's forge, where he waits for Tasslehoff's passing.

The novel Flint the King was the first collaborative work between Mary Kirchoff and Doug Niles, in which Flint investigates a murder mystery in his hometown of Hillhome. Kirchoff imagined Flint's voice as a combination of Wilford Brimley and Yosemite Sam, and referred to Tasslehoff Burrfoot and Flint as "the Abbott and Costello of Dragonlance".

The novel Kindred Spirits details the meeting between Flint and Tanis Half-Elven. According to author Mark Anthony, "Flint believes that there is something more to be had in life, though he follows many different paths in his search for that elusive something."

== Early life ==
One day a Qualinesti elf messenger appears to Flint in his home in Solace. The Speaker of the Suns has recently purchased some of Flint's metalwork and is so impressed by it he wants more. He has asked Flint to come to Qualinesti in order to make some for him. Flint agrees to travel there.

Tanis Half-Elven is residing in Qualinost when Flint arrives. He and Flint become friends almost instantly. Flint teaches Tanis some metalworking, and in addition he builds up a bond with Solastaran.

Flint regularly returns to Qualinost every summer for twenty years. He owns a mule by the name of Fleetfoot. In 308 AC, on his trip to Qualinost, he is waylaid by a Tylor, and in their rush to escape Flint and Fleetfoot accidentally enter into a Sla-Mori (Secret Way) directly to the Tower of the Sun. He reports the attack to the Speaker and a hunt is organized to find and kill the Tylor.

Flint and Tanis go on the trip to kill the Tylor, which they do eventually find, losing one member of their party to it and another of their members killing it. Upon further inspection, one of Tanis's arrows is found in the fallen elf's body, and Tanis is arrested. He was later freed in Qualinost.

Blame is thrown on Tanis when Eld Ailea is killed. Flint is given the task of finding the killer because Flint doesn't believe Tanis has done it. Flint, after searching for days, discovers an elf named Miral, the slayer of the Tylor, is secretly Arelas Kanan, who has a plot to rule Qualinesti. Flint and Tanis stop the plot, and Tanis is free again. When Flint leaves for Solace again, Tanis travels with him, joining into the blacksmithing business.

Flint takes Tika into his house for a time, after she is no longer with her parents. Tika is young at this time, and Flint often makes her toys. Otik eventually adopts her.

Flint's fear of water and boats stem from an accident on Crystalmir Lake when Caramon tried to catch a fish with nothing but his hands. Caramon leaned over too far causing the boat to capsize. With the help of Sturm, Flint was pulled from the water. The accident disturbed Flint, causing him to shun travel across bodies of water in any boat of any kind.

Flint travels along with the Companions to Karthay later to help stop the Minotaur in their efforts to conquer Ansalon. A half-ogre named Kirsig takes a liking to Flint, and Flint grows fond of her. When she is later killed by a Minotaur, Flint is very upset.

During the five year separation between the companions, Flint goes to Hillhome to investigate the death of his brother Aylmar. During this time, he discovers the identity of his brother's killer and in addition, about a sinister plot by the Derro Dwarves of Thorbardin to destroy Hillhome. After heading to Thorbardin, he is caught and held captive by the Derro. After surviving a near death experience, he and a half-derro mountain dwarf Perian, are rescued by a colony of Gully Dwarves and are proclaimed their king and queen. Flint falls in love with Perian, who is later killed by the Derro and their leader Pitrick in the defence of Flint's home village Hillhome.

== War of the Lance ==
Flint meets up with Tas and Tanis outside of Solace after the five year separation. They are attacked by Fewmaster Toede and the goblins, but they fight them off easily. They go on into the Inn, where they meet up with the others. The drunken Theocrat, Hederick, falls into the fire but is promptly healed by Goldmoon's Blue Crystal Staff. The companions are forced to escape with Goldmoon and Riverwind in tow, and set off on a journey that eventually leads them to Xak Tsaroth, where Riverwind nearly dies but is healed. Flint loses his battleaxe en route, along with his helm, but he steals a new weapon from draconians and Tas discovers in the ruins of Xak Tsaroth a helm that only fits a dwarf. He claims it has the hair from the mane of a griffon on it, but actually has horse mane attached to it (Flint being allergic to horse hair still claims it to be of griffon).

Upon return to Solace, the companions, now with Tika and Gilthanas Kanan in tow, are captured and sent to Pax Tharkas as slaves. En route, Porthios leads an attack on the caravan and frees the companions, with some help from Fizban and his fireball spell, as well as Sestun, who breaks the lock. They go to Qualinesti and then traveled through the Sla-Mori to Pax Tharkas. There, they free the slaves and kill Verminaard, decapitating the leadership of the red dragons. He had to comfort Tasslehoff over the death of Fizban who saved him from an imminent fall.

Afterwards, Flint, with the assistance of the dwarven prince Pike (also known as Arman Kharas) enters King Duncan's tomb and retrieves the Hammer of Kharas from its guardian Evenstar, a gold dragon. Following this, the Companions are staying in Thorbardin for a time before they depart to the city of Tarsis. Flint is a bit uncomfortable here, him being a hill dwarf amongst mountain dwarves, who, after the Dwarfgate Wars, have an instinctive dislike of each other. After this they journey to Tarsis to find a place for all the ex-slaves to live. The city is attacked when they are there, and Flint is separated from the others and wound up in Laurana and Sturm's group, which includes Laurana, Sturm, Tas, Gilthanas, Derek Crownguard, Brian Donner, Aran Tallbow, and Flint himself. While not physically present at Silvanesti, Flint is still involved in the dream that takes place there. In his section of the dream, he finds his legs growing weaker and weaker, finally he cannot move and is cut down by Tika, who kills him with her sword-swinging. The death is not real, but it shakes Flint up a bit.

After recovering the dragon orb and defeating Feal-Thas, the group goes upon a ship bound for Sancrist. Flint gets extremely seasick on board, believing his death is imminent and he even gives his helm to Tas, which he wants him to have when he (Flint) dies. He is wrong, of course, his fear of boats getting the better of him.

In the Tomb of Huma, Flint faints when he sees Fizban resurrected, then awakes later to find that Tas and Fizban are gone. He briefly reveals his concern for Tas when he shows genuine worry for him, but quickly covers it up with anger. Flint then travels to Sancrist with Laurana and Theros Ironfeld.

After the Council of Whitestone, Flint goes with Laurana and Tas to the High Clerist's Tower. Flint fights bravely, helping to hold off the Dragonarmies, and eventually Laurana uses the dragon orb to lure the dragons into a deadly trap and scatter the corrupted draconians. Sturm, sadly, dies at the hands of Kitiara uth Matar.

Afterwards, Flint, Laurana, and Tas go back to Sancrist. Laurana receives a promotion to General of the Whitestone Army, and Flint and Tas are "given" a dragon to ride into battle. Flint is horribly scared, but eventually Khirsah (Human name was Fireflash), the dragon, gets him on. In the following Vingaard Campaign, Bakaris, an officer of Kitiara, is captured.

They liberate Kalaman later, being welcomed as heroes again on their return. Flint goes with Laurana to trade Bakaris for Tanis. However, Laurana is captured. Flint and Tas return to Kalaman. They meet the rest of the group there and travel to Neraka with Berem in tow. They have agreed to escort him there.

== Death and afterlife ==
En route to Neraka, Berem runs away. Flint runs after him. On his way through Godshome, Flint's heart gave out and he has a heart attack. He meets Fizban, revealed to Flint as he truly is, and asks him to help him leave Ansalon. Fizban takes Flint to the black pool in Godshome and they disappear.

Flint rests under a tree in the afterlife, somewhere near Reorx's forge. He awaits his friends there, for he is the second among them to die, after Sturm. Reorx mentioned him in the short story "Wanna Bet?" in the Book 2 of Tales I anthology: Kender, Gully Dwarves, and Gnomes as someone sitting at the tree near his forge to be annoying.

After the Chaos War, his waiting is over; he is reunited with all his friends. He waited especially for Tas, his best friend, despite how it may have seemed in life.

== Role among companions ==
Flint is proficient in battle axe combat. His trusty battle axe is his favorite weapon. He wears a helm with hair that he claims to have come from the mane of a griffon, although it is actually from a horse even though Flint has a "severe allergy" to horses. He wears medium armor. He is friendly with everyone in the group, with the exception of Raistlin (whom he doesn't trust), and Tasslehoff. Aside from being close in height, these two are nothing alike. Flint is old, ornery, cranky, and gruff. Tas is happy-go-lucky, for the most part, curious, and youthful in spirit. However, despite Flint's apparent hate for Tas, always calling him "you doorknob", deep down they are very close, almost as close as the bond between Flint and Tanis, perhaps even equal to that bond. He is a father figure to the group along with Tanis, and refers to everyone in the group as his "children". He originally taught the younger Sturm and Caramon a great deal about combat and fighting tactics. Although too short to use a sword sized for humans, Flint had strong arms and was a good wrestler, and taught the two young warriors a good deal about unarmed fighting.

== Appearance and traits ==
Flint is roughly half the size of an elf. His arms, however, are nearly twice the size of an elf's. He has steel blue eyes and a black beard, which later turns white. He doesn't like heights and is deathly afraid of water and boats, following an accident in which Caramon nearly drowned him. He is also "allergic to" (scared to death of) horses and will sneeze incessantly in their nearness. He loves woodworking and metalsmithing. He speaks Common, Dwarf, and some Elvish, picked up from Tanis and understand goblinspeak.

== Reception ==
Lauren Davis of io9 called Flint "the group's father figure whose crankiness serves as a bromantic foil to Tasslehoff's good cheer".

The character of Flint Fireforge was listed in UGO Entertainment's list of "The Best Dwarves Ever".

In the Io9 series revisiting older Dungeons & Dragons novels, Rob Bricken commented that "An extremely grumpy dwarf who's effectively the surly grandfather of the group. As required by fantasy law, his people were run out of their ancestral mountain home, but thankfully this doesn't figure in at all."

== Other media ==
=== Video games ===
Flint appears as one of the player characters in Advanced Dungeons & Dragons: Heroes of the Lance.

=== Miniature figures ===
Flint was included in Ral Partha's Dragonlance Heroes boxed figures set of lead miniatures. A reviewer for Dragon magazine felt that Ral Partha successfully matched their figures to the descriptions of the characters in the novels, and described his figure: "Flint is clothed in a set of brigandine armor that covers him from his shoulders to just below the waist. The rivets and individual pieces are clearly visible as is the weapons harness that crosses the back and front. The helmet is horned and split slightly to allow for his hair. Flint has a detailed beard but is somewhat thinner in the body than I'd expected. He looks like he is growling, and he is shaking his left fist. His right hand holds a battle axe. Simple boots, a shirt, and forearm bucklers finish his wardrobe."

=== Dragonlance movie ===
Fred Tatasciore voiced Flint in the animated movie Dragonlance: Dragons of Autumn Twilight.

== Sources ==
- The Annotated Chronicles (1999), by Margaret Weis and Tracy Hickman
- Kindred Spirits (April 1991), by Mark Anthony and Ellen Porath
- The Companions (January 1993), by Tina Daniell
- Leave From the Inn of the Last Home
- Wolf, Nadine (2010). Religious Concepts in Fantasy Literature. GRIN Verlag. ISBN 978-3640661428.
