= Dragonlance Chronicles =

Trilogy of fantasy novels by Margaret Weis

- Dragons of Autumn Twilight; Dragons of Winter Night; Dragons of Spring Dawning
- Author: Margaret Weis and Tracy Hickman
- Country: United States
- Language: English
- Genre: Fantasy
- Publisher: Random House/TSR, Wizards of the Coast
- Published: 1984–1985
- Media type: Print
- No. of books: 3
- Followed by: Dragonlance Legends

The Dragonlance Chronicles is a trilogy of fantasy novels written by Margaret Weis and Tracy Hickman, which take place in the Dragonlance setting. This series is the first set of Dragonlance novels, and is followed by the Dragonlance Legends series.

The three books in the series are Dragons of Autumn Twilight (November 1984), Dragons of Winter Night (July 1985), and Dragons of Spring Dawning (September 1985).

== History ==
The Dragonlance Chronicles novels were based on a series of Dungeons & Dragons (D&D) game modules. The Chronicles trilogy came about because the designers wanted novels to tell the story of the game world they were creating, something to which TSR, Inc. (TSR) agreed only reluctantly. Soon after Tracy Hickman came to TSR in 1982, management announced the intention to develop his series of dragons based role-playing adventures. Hickman's storyline was chosen for the Dragonlance books due to the 12 part storyline. Hickman's proposal resulted in the Dragonlance Chronicles, which led to his association with Margaret Weis. Weis was assigned to edit Hickman's "Project Overlord", as it was initially called, a novel intended to be coordinated with a trilogy of AD&D modules. Weis and her new partner, Tracy Hickman, worked to plot the novel; they had hired an author, who didn't work out, but by that time, Weis and Hickman were so into the project that they felt they had to write it. Jean Black, the Managing Editor of TSR's Book Department, picked Hickman and Weis to write Dragons of Autumn Twilight and the rest of the Dragonlance Chronicles series. The storyline of the original Dragonlance series had been plotted and outlined before either the novel trilogy or the games were written.

== Synopsis ==
The plot of the Dragonlance Chronicles is centered around the conflict known as the "War of the Lance", in which the Heroes of the Lance, aided by the free people of Krynn, fight to repel Verminaard, the Dragon High lord and one of the leaders of the dark goddess Takhisis during a time in the world when the gods have abandoned the races following an event known as The Cataclysm. While the main events of the war are covered in the original trilogy of books, some later released books occur during the same time period, such as War of the Lance. Several game modules for the Dungeons & Dragons tabletop role-playing game were also released that expanded on the events of the war, such as Dragons of Glory and Dragonlance Adventures.

=== Dragons of Autumn Twilight ===
A group of old friends and new companions meet and begin their journeys to become the Heroes of the Lance. They enter Xak Tsaroth, find the Disks of Mishakal, are captured, meet Gilthanas, invade Pax Tharkas, meet Elistan, who becomes the first cleric of Paladine, incite a subsequent slave revolt, and kill a Dragon Highlord.

=== Dragons of Winter Night ===
The companions continue in their journeys to become the Heroes of the Lance. They travel to Tarsis, which is destroyed in an ensuing dragon attack, split into two groups, one of which goes to Silvanesti only to find it ravaged by a nightmare caused by a Dragon Orb, the other to Icewall Glacier where they kill a Dragon Highlord and take his Dragon Orb. The former group succeeds in obtaining the Dragon Orb and ending the nightmare. The latter group is attacked as they escape and are stranded on Southern Ergoth, an island where they meet numerous elves. Eventually, they travel to the tomb of Huma, where they meet Fizban and a silver dragon in disguise. The former group travel to Sancrist Isle, where Sturm becomes a full Knight of Solamnia, a Dragon Orb is shattered, and a dragonlance is forged. The identity of another Dragon Highlord is discovered. The dragons attack, but are driven off with new dragonlances.

=== Dragons of Spring Dawning ===
The group continue and conclude their journey in becoming Heroes of the Lance.

== Reception ==
Jason Heller, of The A.V. Club, wrote a positive review of Dragonlance Chronicles, remarking that while the novels were not very original compared to previous fantasy works by J.R.R. Tolkien and Fritz Leiber, they filled a void for new gamers in 1980s by introducing fantasy fiction archetypes in a rich, cohesive setting.

Dragonlance Chronicles appeared on the 2024 Game Rant "31 Best Dungeons & Dragons Novels, Ranked" list at #3.

== Reviews ==
- Science Fiction Chronicle

== Film ==
The Dragonlance Chronicles have also been adapted as an animated movie entitled Dragons of Autumn Twilight, starring Michelle Trachtenberg, Kiefer Sutherland, Michael Rosenbaum, and Lucy Lawless, and directed by Will Meugniot. "Dragons of Autumn Twilight" was released on 15 January 2008.
