= Takhisis =

- Dragonlance character
- First appearance: Dragons of Autumn Twilight (1984)
- Created by: Margaret Weis and Tracy Hickman

In-universe information
- Alias: The One God
- Race: Deity
- Gender: Female
- Title(s): Dragon queen Nilat the Corrupter; Tamex, the False Metal; Mai-Tat; She of Many Faces; Queen of Many Colors and None; The Dark Queen; Erestem; Tii'Mhut; Lady Chaos; Mwarg; The Dark Warrior; Shadow Sorcerer
- Alignment: Evil

Takhisis is a fictional character from the Dragonlance universe. She is depicted as the main goddess of evil in the setting and head of the Dark Pantheon.

== Titles and forms ==
Within the Dragonlance setting, Takhisis was a sister of Gilean and Paladine, the goddess of control and evil, consort to Sargonnas, and mother to Zeboim and Nuitari. Takhisis was responsible for the corruption of the chromatic dragons, and appeared in one form as a dragon with heads the colors of blue, black, white, red, and green. Takhisis is also referred to as Dragon Queen (among elves), Nilat the Corrupter (among the barbarians of the plains), Tamex, the False Metal (among dwarves), Mai-tat, She of Many Faces (among the people of Ergoth), Queen of Many Colors and None (among the Knights of Solamnia), the Dark Queen, Erestem, Tii'Mhut, Lady Chaos, Mwarg, the One God, the Dark Warrior, and Shadow Sorcerer. Jeff Grubb believes that she is Tiamat, Goddess (or Queen) of evil dragons in many other Dungeons & Dragons campaign settings. However, the two are separate entities according to Dragonlance creator, Tracy Hickman and others. The 4th Edition Draconomicon books confirm that Takhisis is Tiamat in fourth edition. This is confirmed again in the 5th edition Dungeon Master's Guide.

Takhisis most often takes the form of a five-headed dragon; each head is represented by the color of one of the evil dragons (red, blue, green, black, and white). She also often uses the form of a beautiful temptress, said to be so lovely that no man can resist her. Additionally, she has another form known as the Dark Warrior.

Sargonnas is Takhisis' consort. Together they have two children: Nuitari and Zeboim.

== Ambition ==
Within the Dragonlance universe, Takhisis is the most ambitious of the gods, frequently making plans to upset the balance and take over the world for herself. In Dragons of the Hourglass Mage, for example, Takhisis attempts to take control of all magic. After being driven back by Huma Dragonbane in the Third Dragon War and sealed from the world, she bides her time in the Abyss, always looking for new ways into the world. This brings about the War of the Lance, where the dark goddess is ultimately thwarted by the Heroes of the Lance, and subsequently contributes to the Chaos War and the War of Souls.

Raistlin Majere attempts to destroy Takhisis and assume her role as head god of evil. He succeeds in one timeline, but destroys the world of Krynn in the ensuing magical battle. His brother Caramon, with the aid of a time-travelling device, dissuades him from this path; and Raistlin sacrifices himself to prevent Takhisis from leaving the Abyss.

== The War of Souls ==
After the Chaos War, Takhisis steals the world from the rest of the gods and becomes the "One God" of the world. When the rest of the gods return to Krynn, they realize that Takhisis has gone too far. Although Sargonnas has generally been loyal to her, the actions leading up to her being made mortal lead Sargonnas to declare she has gone too far and to support the decision. In order to retain the balance, Paladine sacrifices his godhood and immortality in order for Takhisis to be stripped of her godhood and immortality. She is then killed by the elven king Silvanoshei.

== Other publications ==
Takhisis is key to the Dragonlance world creation myth as the primordial source of evil. This central role is crucial to how creation myths are presented.

In the neo-pagan press, a series of books published by Oberon Zell-Ravenheart, looks at Takhisis in the Dragonlance world and compares her to the Babylonian and Dungeons & Dragons version of Tiamat. The book is written as a school book for young wizards and witches of the neo-pagan sort. Takhisis is described for her role in the wars of good vs. evil.

This ultimate source of the theme of evil is discussed again in a presentation by Dr. Stefan Ekman of Lund University in Sweden. Dr. Ekman compares Takhisis and other fantasy "dark lords," such as Lord Foul and Sauron, to the biblical Satan. In particular he states, "Even though not all of the Dark Lords above signify the ultimate source of evil, Lord Foul, the Dark One, and Takhisis certainly do. And all of them are ultimately actants, characters whose raison d’être is to provide the final threat".

This theme of good versus evil, and humans versus gods, is expanded in Dragonlance, a Shared World of Fantasy Fiction and Role-Playing Games. The central focus of this thesis is the struggle of the human characters versus Takhisis. This struggle is compared with the human, or at least mortal, heroes of the stories of J. R. R. Tolkien's The Lord of the Rings and C. S. Lewis' The Chronicles of Narnia.

Tiamat, in her Dragonlance/Krynn incarnation is also the subject of in the Dragon Gods and Evil dragons sections of the Practical Guide to Dragons. She is discussed in universe style with sidebars detailing her real-world publishing significance. This is continued in the follow-up series The Dragon Codices, in which Takhisis is the main, if somewhat hidden, antagonist.

== Reception ==
In the Io9 series revisiting older Dungeons & Dragons novels, Rob Bricken commented that "The primary adventure of the novel is Tanis and his comrades' attempt to bring Berem—aka the Green Gem Man—to the Temple of Takhisis at Neraka so he can do something that will help seal the goddess away again. Takhisis is well-aware of Berem and sends her draconian armies and dragons to find him, because if she gets her claws on him, she'll be free and unbeatable. [...] Apparently, the column had imprisoned Takhisis and the removal of the gem allowed the goddess a little bit of freedom, which is why she's causing trouble in the present. But all it's going to take to save the world is to take a bit of super-glue and sticking the gem back on the column. It all feels quite banal, especially compared to throwing the most powerful enchanted item on the planet into an open volcano."

== Footnotes ==
=== Sources ===
- Wolf, Nadine (2010). Religious Concepts in Fantasy Literature. GRIN Verlag. ISBN 978-3640661428.

List of Dragonlance deities
Good:	Paladine	Majere	Kiri-Jolith	Mishakal	Habbakuk	Branchala	Solinari
Neutral:	Gilean	Sirrion	Reorx	Chislev	Zivilyn	Shinare	Lunitari
Evil:	Takhisis	Sargonnas	Morgion	Chemosh	Zeboim	Hiddukel	Nuitari
Other:	High God & Chaos	Mina

PANTHEON OF DRAGONLANCE
High God	Chaos
Paladine	Mishakal	Gilean	Takhisis	Sargonnas
Branchala	Majere	Reorx	Morgion	Chemosh	Hiddukel
Shinare	Sirrion	Chislev	Zivilyn
Kiri-Jolith	Habbakuk	Solinari	Mina	Lunitari	Nuitari	Zeboim
