= Goldmoon =

- Dragonlance character
- Goldmoon riding a pegasus on her way to Xak Tsaroth. Illustration by Clyde Caldwell.
- First appearance: Dragons of Autumn Twilight (1984)
- Created by: Margaret Weis and Tracy Hickman
- Voiced by: Lucy Lawless (2008 animated film)

In-universe information
- Alias: Goldmoon of the Que Shu
- Race: Human
- Gender: Female
- Titles: High Priestess of the Que Shu tribe; Cleric of Mishakal
- Class: Cleric/Barbarian
- Home: Que Shu

Goldmoon (also known as Goldmoon of the Que Shu tribe or just Goldmoon of the Que Shu) is a fictional character from the Dragonlance fantasy series of novels and role playing games, originally published by TSR, Inc. and later by Wizards of the Coast.

Introduced in the first book of the original Chronicles Trilogy, Dragons of Autumn Twilight, written by Margaret Weis and Tracy Hickman in 1984; Goldmoon has become a recurring character for over 16 years in multiple Dragonlance novels and series, either as a protagonist or as a supporting character.

== Character background ==
According to Patrick Lucien Price, author of the "Bertrem's essay on numerology" section published in Leaves from the Inn of the Last Home (1987), Goldmoon was designed to be a kind and understanding female barbarian, who loved to travel, advise, and take care of others. As a high-profile member of her community, she was a natural speaker, able to inspire others to reach for their goals.

The Dragonlance novels do not cover Goldmoon's childhood, although her birth date, February 5, 322 A.C. (Alt Cataclius or After Cataclysm) can be found in the Leaves from the Inn of the Last Home source book. Different novels and short stories agree that her parents are Arrowthorn, Chieftain of the Que Shu—a tribe located in the plains of Abanasinia, a desolate area in the central western area of Ansalon in the fictional world of Krynn—and Tearsong, deceased high priestess of the tribe.

Goldmoon and Riverwind. Illustration by Keith Parkinson.

The short story "Heart of Goldmoon", written by Laura Hickman and Kate Novak and published in the Love and War (1987) recompilation, gives insight about her life after her mother died, explaining that the Que Shu community is built around the figure of a high priestess, and whoever marries the priestess becomes Chieftain of the tribe, with the first daughter of the couple becoming the next priestess. The focus of the story is Goldmoon journeying to the Hall of the Sleeping Spirits, the place where the tombs of her ancestors are kept, to commune with their spirits in order to become the high priestess of the tribe. The journey ends with an exchange of confirmation of love between Goldmoon and Riverwind, a shepherd who was acting as her bodyguard during the travel, as well as the meeting between Goldmoon and Tearsong's spirit, in which Goldmoon is taught about the ancient gods and given a task in the name of Mishakal, goddess of healing, which she later fulfills. At the end of the short story it is stated that Riverwind will be taking the Courting quest, a task he must finish before being able to marry Goldmoon.

Paul B. Thompson and Tonya C. Cook explain this quest in the novel Riverwind the Plainsman (1990), from the Tales series, in which he succeeded in bringing back a Blue Crystal Staff, proof that the ancient gods existed. However, the staff was not accepted as a valid proof by the tribe, and as related by Weis and Hickman in Dragons of Autumn Twilight (1984), moments before he was stoned by the tribe, Goldmoon embraced him, and they both vanish from the village. Reappearing just outside the city of Solace, they decide to travel, to look for someone who could tell them more about the staff, which marks the proper beginning of the Chronicles trilogy.

Character art was first created by Clyde Caldwell for a calendar, and Goldmoon has also been illustrated by such artists as Larry Elmore and Keith Parkinson. According to Elmore, Margaret Weis's reaction to Caldwell's first drawing was very negative; Weis said Goldmoon looked like "a whore". Elmore subsequently attempted to allay Weis's concerns, and drew the character for a book cover to appear less "sexy", adding leather pants. He and Parkinson collaborated on Goldmoon illustrations for a long time afterwards. Weis reportedly appreciated Parkinson's attempt to incorporate Weis's vision of Goldmoon as "Native American with a Celtic touch". Both Weis and Tracy Hickman continued to consult about the artwork, but Weis was always the one more invested in a particular vision.

== Development through the series ==
=== Chronicles trilogy ===
Margaret Weis and Tracy Hickman introduce Goldmoon in chapter 3 of Dragons of Autumn Twilight (1984), titled "Knight of Solamnia. The old man's party." She is presented as a heavily cloaked, silvery-gold haired woman carrying a plain staff, accompanied by a tall stone-faced barbarian. The authors explain that shortly after their arrival to the Inn of the Last Home a fight breaks out and the true nature of her healing staff is revealed, forcing the barbarians and a group of friends to run away. It is after escaping with the barbarians that the friends realize Goldmoon's desire of traveling to Haven, where she hoped the Seekers, priests who were in search of the old gods but degenerated into a political movement, would be able to teach her about the healing staff.

In the following chapters, Weis and Hickman continue to make the female barbarian the main focus of the story, stating that she discovered two constellations were missing from the firmament, and then revisiting when the staff protected Riverwind when the tribe was going to stone him. However, her protagonism fades in the battle sequences that follow, where she is protected by Riverwind, Sturm Brightblade, a Squire of the Knights of Solamnia and Tanis Half-Elven, the leader of the group. This behavior becomes constant throughout the rest of the series.

The authors give the story a harder push when they explain the group, later known as the Heroes of the Lance, travels to Xak Tsaroth, which is the broken city where Riverwind previously found the magical staff. The sixteenth chapter, "A bitter choice. The greatest gift." presents the earlier conversation between Goldmoon and her deceased mother, Tearsong, and an appearance of Mishakal, goddess of healing and protector of the Blue Crystal Staff Goldmoon carries, in which she explains the different sacrifices Goldmoon must make in order to obtain the goddess' gift and the tasks she must fulfill, including the retrieval of the Disks of Mishakal, a sacred book of platinum with the teachings of Paladine, highest god of light in Krynn within it. The novel continues, indicating that Goldmoon receives the power of healing before the goddess departs, which Goldmoon promptly uses to save a mortally wounded Riverwind after an encounter against Khisanth, a black dragon protecting the broken city.

Goldmoon reaches the peak of attention when the authors write about her apparent sacrifice to defeat Khisanth, during the retrieval of the Disks of Mishakal. However, it is soon explained that her sacrifice was the last test the goddess Mishakal needed from her, and as the group nears the exit of the dungeon, they find Goldmoon waiting for them, blessed by the deity as a true cleric of Mishakal with the power of calling upon Mishakal's help when in need.

Fulfilling her final mission, Goldmoon delivers the Disks of Mishakal to a former Seeker, Elistan, whom the group meets in Pax Tharkas after they have been captured by the Dragonarmies of Ansalon, the forces of evil invading the continent of Ansalon. In this way, at the end of the book, Goldmoon marries Riverwind in a valley not far from Pax Tharkas after their group defeated Lord Verminaard in Pax Tharkas and freed the slaves. The marriage vows the characters take are based in the Mormonism Celestial marriage.

Her involvement in the last two books of the trilogy—and therefore during the War of the Lance—abruptly diminishes at the beginning of the second book, Dragons of Winter Night (1985). Her appearances are mostly to give counsel, spread the teachings of Mishakal and order new clerics. During the second half of the last book, Dragons of Spring Dawning (1985), Goldmoon learns she is pregnant. Her goodbye to Laurana Kanan in Kalaman is her last appearance in the Chronicles trilogy.

Goldmoon is instrumental in reviving the faith of the people of Krynn during a period when the gods have seemingly disappeared. According to Tracy Hickman, "The restoration of truth and faith are Goldmoon's central theme and, to a great extent, the theme of this first book in the series."

=== Legends trilogy ===
Although the series focus heavily on Caramon and Raistlin Majere, Riverwind makes an appearance at the beginning of the first book of the Legends trilogy, Time of the Twins (1986), written by Margaret Weis and Tracy Hickman and published by TSR, in which he is recognized as leader of the Que Shu and other barbarian tribes by wearing the Mantle of the Chieftain.

This apparition is also used by the authors to explain the current situation of the couple. With a two-year-old son—Wanderer—and twin daughters—Moonsong and Brightdawn—the couple have worked hard to join the different tribes of Abanasinia, their homeland. It is finally explained that Goldmoon is spreading the teachings of her patron deity there, but nothing more is said about her.

=== Chaos War series ===
Goldmoon was not specifically included in the Chaos War, an event in which the mad god Chaos tries to destroy the world of Krynn. However, in Spirit of the Wind (1998), Chris Pierson explains that Wanderer, Riverwind and Goldmoon's son, has a three-year-old son, Cloudhawk, but nobody remembers his mother. The author hints that Goldmoon's tribe was attacked by shadow wights, chaotic creatures that banish anyone they possess to utter oblivion, destroying even memories from others about the person in question. This hint is given through Wanderer's sisters, Moonsong and Brightdawn, when they speculate that one such creature killed her. The novel ends with the death of Brightdawn and Riverwind while fighting the red dragon overlord Malystryx, and Moonsong scarred forever, events that weighted heavily on Goldmoon's spirit.

=== The Fifth Age series ===
The Age of Mortals starts at the end of Dragons of Summer Flame (1996) novel, with the departure of the krynnish gods and the banishment of magic and clerical powers known to Krynn until that moment. Needing a new source of power, a special kind of magic named mysticism is created based on previous abilities found in the Dragonlance novels.

Jean Rabe's novel The Silver Stair (1999) explains how Goldmoon, following a recurrent dream, travels to the Isle of Schallsea with Jasper Fireforge, where she finds the fabled Silver Stairs, an endless stair that was thought to be a portal to reach Solinari, the white moon of Krynn. The novel reveals that while climbing it, she experiences a new vision about the Power of the Heart, a special magic that would come to replace the one provided by the gods of old and which she first discovered while healing a dying Jasper, three years before in Solace.

The novel continues explaining the different difficulties the group had to establish a camp, while at the same time introducing a branch of mysticism, dark mysticism, which was discovered by Goldmoon's wish to talk with Riverwind. From that point Goldmoon continued using it to communicate with Riverwind's spirit, although conversations between the couple are usually kept secret from the reader. Other authors like Margaret Weis and Tracy Hickman made use of that bond between the couple in subsequent books.

By the end of the novel she has managed to found the Citadel of Light, which was established as the healing center of Ansalon. Because of this, Goldmoon has been used by Dragonlance authors to first bring clerical healing from the gods of good back to Krynn during the Fourth Age, and then to bring mysticism during the Fifth Age.

=== Dragons of a New Age trilogy ===
Goldmoon and Dhamon, with Khellendros at the back. Illustration by Matt Stawicki.

Goldmoon's most controversial appearance was in the Dragons of a New Age trilogy, written by Jean Rabe between 1996 and 1998, in which it is related the coming of the Dragon Overlords, dragons of exceptional size and power, to the world of Krynn.

In The Dawning of a New Age (1996), the first book of the series, Jean Rabe indicates that Goldmoon appears as an illusion to Dhamon Grimwulf, a former Knight of Takhisis, summoning him to the Last Heroes' Tomb, the tomb where the heroes of the Chaos War are kept. The author gives the reader, at that point, the guidelines for Dhamon's mission throughout the trilogy.

The author keeps Goldmoon's interventions small, especially through visions and communications with Jasper Fireforge and Palin Majere, until the second half of the second book in the series, The Day of the Tempest (1997), when the party of adventurers arrives at the Citadel of Light. It is here when the author details how an enchanted Dhamon is forced to slay Goldmoon.

The prologue of the last book in the trilogy, The Eve of the Maelstrom (1998), relates a shortened version of Goldmoon's death, adding her travel to the afterlife and her meeting with Riverwind, her husband. However, while at the end of the second book Riverwind was expecting her, in the third book she is told that her time has not arrived yet. During the length of the book, Goldmoon appears as an encouraging voice when her friends need her. It is towards the end of the book when the author reveals how Goldmoon is brought back to Krynn, as Goldmoon tells a dying Jasper he was supposed to die in Schallsea, and that his faith and his death against Onysablet, the black dragon overlord, restores her life.

=== War of Souls trilogy ===
Margaret Weis and Tracy Hickman give Goldmoon a more prominent role during the War of Souls trilogy, when she is well over her nineties. During the first chapters of the first book, Dragons of a Fallen Sun (2000), Weis and Hickman explain how Goldmoon is transformed by a magical storm, regaining the body she had during the Chronicles trilogy. The authors use this occasion to show an angry, depressed, and bitter side of her that had not been exploited in depth before. Her new behavior is explained due her expectation to die soon and join the soul of her already deceased husband in the afterlife, even calling this change a curse instead of a blessing.

Her protagonism increases near the end of the first book when she becomes the first character to discover that the souls of dead people are draining the magic from clerics, mages, and dragons, giving the reader the first solid reference of the reason about why magic has been weakening in the world of Krynn. The initial shock is replaced with the unexplained urge of following the River of Souls, also referred as the river of the dead, the continuous stream of wandering souls moving towards an unknown meeting location. Goldmoon spends the end of the first book and most of the second book, Dragons of a Lost Star (2001), following the stream until arriving to Nightlund, where the Tower of High Sorcery of Palanthas was hidden.

The final chapter of the second book relates the meeting between Goldmoon and an orphaned girl she found in the Isle of Schallsea whom she had raised and trained in the clerical arts, Mina. Mina now serves the One God, or Takhisis in disguise, in her attempt to bring the "true gods" back to Krynn, like what Goldmoon did many years ago. During this meeting the reader is revealed that Goldmoon's body was restored by Takhisis, evil goddess of darkness, through Mina's prayer. However, refusing to become Takhisis' herald, the goddess drains the life out of Goldmoon and orders Mina to secure her corpse in an amber sarcophagus.

In the first chapter of the last book of the trilogy, Dragons of a Vanished Moon (2002), Weis and Hickman rehearse Goldmoon and Mina's meeting, and is the last time Goldmoon is seen alive in the Dragonlance series. From that point, it is explained that her soul was enslaved and forced to join the other magic draining ghosts. Throughout this book she is only present as a body in a coffin that is being carried to the Temple of Huerzyd, where Takhisis would possess it to spread the word of her return, confident that people would worship her if one of her own greatest enemies, Goldmoon, has been converted.

In the last chapter of the book, the authors explain that her spirit is freed after Takhisis is defeated, and has joined her friends' souls to travel to the afterlife. Her death puts an end to the Heroes of the Lance, as she was the last surviving character from the original group created in 1984 by Weis and Hickman.

== Controversy ==
The character of Goldmoon was killed in the Dragons of a New Age trilogy, during events explained in The Day of the Tempest novel, and resurrected in the last novel of the series, The Eve of the Maelstrom. In the Dragonlance environment, resurrection is extremely rare (with Beldinas Pilofiro, latest Kingpriest of Istar, resurrecting Cathan MarSevrin with Paladine's intervention in Chosen of the Gods (2001), Fistandantilus through his powerful magic and his bloodstone in Fistandantilus Reborn (1997), and Raistlin Majere returning from the Abyss through Dalamar and Palin intervention in "The Legacy" short story in The Magic of Krynn (1987) the main examples). Although fans theorized about her death and resurrection, the matter was clarified by a mail sent to the Dragonlance list by Miranda Horner, Wizards of the Coast Web Content Developer, and in an interview with Jean Rabe, author of the trilogy.

According to Horner:

The underlying thing was that it was rather confusing to come into, and it affected my project to some extent. Steve and I worked on Citadel, and I think he and Sue ended up having to change the stuff in there to make Goldmoon alive. I know that I had to adjust Wings of Fury to reflect book stuff, and books had to change Eve to reflect some game stuff.

Writer Jean Rabe explained in an interview the difficulties of multiple writers working in the same fictional universe, saying she was given permission by her editor to kill off the character in one of her novels. She was forced to bring the character back to life in the very next book because others had plans for Goldmoon.

Synchronization problems between novels and gaming material, and even between novels themselves are common in the Dragonlance environment where, except in few cases, the novel authors do not assist in the creation of the role playing game modules.

== Related media ==
=== Video games ===
Goldmoon appears as one of the player characters in Advanced Dungeons & Dragons: Heroes of the Lance. Goldmoon can use her magical staff to restore any deceased character back to life, and she is able to perform eight additional divine miracles.

=== Miniature figures ===
Goldmoon was included in Ral Partha's Dragonlance Heroes boxed figures set of lead miniatures. A reviewer for Dragon magazine complimented the work Ral Partha did in matching the appearance of their figures to the descriptions of the characters from the novels, and described her figure: "Goldmoon is standing in a relaxed position, holding a lute in her right hand and a staff and symbol in her left. The figure has long, flowing hair with braids over her shoulders. A simple blouse and belt with a buckle that blends into an elaborate, fur trimmed loin cloth and pouch complete the clothing. For outer wear, she has a full-length fur-trimmed cloak, and her buckskin boots are also fur-lined and fur-trimmed."

=== Dragonlance: Fifth Age ===
As part of the backstory for the Dragonlance: Fifth Age game, Goldmoon "has awakened to a mystic power within her own heart, fueled by the essence of life and the purity of emotion", and teaches this new form of magic throughout her land.

=== Dragonlance movie ===
Actress Lucy Lawless voiced Goldmoon in the 2008 animated Dragonlance: Dragons of Autumn Twilight movie, directed by Will Meugniot, written by George Strayton and produced by Toonz Animation, Commotion Pictures, Epic Level Entertainment, Kickstart Entertainment and Paramount Pictures. Lawless said that she was directed to voice Goldmoon as a Native American, and that after extensive feedback, she was eventually asked to use the voice of Xena.

== Reception ==
The character of Goldmoon has been criticized as a feminine stereotype of the "placid healer" rather than a fully developed fictional persona.

Lauren Davis of io9 commented on how the heroes of the Dragonlance Chronicles feel like they are a dysfunctional family, describing the Plainsfolk Riverwind and Goldmoon as "so-called "barbarians" in a strange land".

In the Io9 series revisiting older Dungeons & Dragons novels, Rob Bricken describes her as "A barbarian and de facto chieftain of the Que-Shu tribe. She's a priest of Mishakal, which makes her the first cleric since the Cataclysm. She bears the Blue Crystal Staff, which gives her the first healing powers in 300 years, too." Bricken identifies her as "arguably the most important character in the series, as her desire to fulfill her goddess' behest drives most of the story."

== See also ==
- War of the Lance
- War of Souls
- Advanced Dungeons and Dragons: Heroes of the Lance
