= Dragons of Spring Dawning =

1985 novel by Margaret Weis and Tracy Hickman

- Cover of the first edition.
- Authors: Margaret Weis; Tracy Hickman
- Cover artist: Larry Elmore
- Language: English
- Series: Dragonlance Chronicles
- Genre: Fantasy literature
- Publisher: Random House
- Publication date: September 1985
- Publication place: United States
- Media type: Print (hardcover and paperback)
- Pages: 384 (paperback)
- ISBN: 0-88038-175-2
- OCLC: 43010894
- Dewey Decimal: 813/.54 19
- LC Class: PS3573.E3978 D74 1985
- Preceded by: Dragons of Winter Night

2000 paperback edition cover.

Dragons of Spring Dawning is a 1985 fantasy novel by American writers Tracy Hickman and Margaret Weis. The third book in the Dragonlance Chronicles series, it continues the events from Dragons of Winter Night (1985) and sets up the premise of the Dragonlance Legends trilogy, also written by Weis and Hickman.

Originally published in September 1985, the novel has seen multiple reprints with the latest reprint in March 2004. It has also been adapted into a 12-issue comic book series.

== Plot ==
=== Into the Blood Sea ===
The book begins with Tanis Half-Elven in Flotsam. Kitiara has recently left for Solamnia to lead the Dragonarmies in their failed attack against the High Clerist's Tower, which was depicted in the previous novel and resulted in the death of Sturm Brightblade. Tanis returns to the other companions, being watched by the draconian Gakhan, Kitiara's personal assassin. Returning to his friends (Goldmoon, Riverwind, Tika Waylan, Caramon and Raistlin Majere), Tanis tells them the half-truth that he was mistaken for an officer by an unspecified Dragon Highlord and forced to continue the impersonation for his own safety.

Later on, the companions depart to Kalaman via Blood Sea of Istar by the ship Perechon, where the mysterious Berem (also called "the Everman" and "the Green Gemstone Man") works as a helmsman. Kitiara leads her forces and her dragon Skie to follow The Perechon. Evading pursuit, Berem steers the ship straight towards the whirlpool at the center of the sea, which was formed over the ruins of Istar city during the Cataclysm. Eventually Kitiara is unable to follow them, but The Perechon is caught in the whirlpool and the heroes realize they are doomed. Raistlin uses his Dragon Orb to teleport away, leaving the rest of his companions behind. Soon afterward, the Perechon tips over the edge of the whirlpool and the rest of the companions vanish beneath the waves.

=== The Master of Past and Present ===
Raistlin's spell brings him to the steps of the Great Library of Palanthas, where the great librarian and historian Astinus lives. The strain of working such powerful magic has left Raistlin on the verge of death.

Knowing he will die soon, the mage requests access to the ancient spell books in the Great Library. Astinus grants this, but Raistlin cannot use these books without "The Key", a formula that has been lost over the ages. Watching over the wizard who he believes will die soon, Astinus says his good-byes but then accidentally lets slip the fact that the gods Paladine, Gilean and Takhisis, Queen of Darkness, are possessors of "the Key of Knowledge". Calling upon the spirit that has helped him before (during the Test), Raistlin makes a dark bargain saying "Save me and save yourself".

=== The Golden General ===
Not long afterwards, the elven princess Laurana receives a message from Lord Gunthar Uth-Wistan, leader of the Knights of Solamnia, in which he names her as the new commander of the knights stationed in Palanthas (a political move on Lord Gunthar's part to limit political maneuvering within the knighthood). Lord Amothus of Palanthas then places her in command of the armies of Palanthas as well, since the city is full of peaceful people and the army has been deemed rather pointless for some time.

Gilthanas and Silvara arrive at Palanthas, bringing the legendary good dragons with them. The two explain that together they journeyed to Sanction, the home of the Dragonarmies and discovered the truth about the origin of the draconians. The Dragonarmies had ensured that the good dragons would not join the war against them by taking their eggs hostage. But now in the Temple, Gilthanas and Silvara see that the clerics of Takhisis and the mages of the black robes have been perverting the eggs of the good dragons in order to spawn the new race of draconians. Having been told what has happened with their eggs, the good dragons are now willing to join the fight and avenge their children.

Later on Gilthanas tells Laurana that while he was in Sanction he overheard the Dragon Highlord Kitiara bragging to the Dragon Emperor Ariakas about how Tanis Half-Elven is serving her as both an officer and lover. This confirms for Laurana what Kitiara told her at the High Clerist's Tower in the previous novel.

With the Dragonlances in her possession and the good dragons on her side, Laurana organizes a flying cavalry of Knights of Solamnia and has her army take the offensive. Laurana becomes known as the "Golden General" during this campaign as her beauty and courage inspire her troops. Her army surges out of Palanthas, defeating the Dragonarmies in a series of battles and liberating much of northern Solamnia. During one of these battles Tasslehoff and Flint, riding a bronze dragon known as Fireflash, capture Kitiara's second-in-command Bakaris (who had insisted on riding into battle despite not being able to use his arm, previously wounded by Laurana at the High Clerist's Tower).

=== The Trap ===
Laurana's army liberates the city of Kalaman, which honors the Golden General at their Spring Dawning Festival. Kitiara responds by sending the elfmaid a message that says Tanis has been mortally wounded and wants to see her before he dies. Kitiara will only allow Tanis to be exchanged for Bakaris. Flint and Tas warn Laurana that Kitiara is lying and this is obviously a trap, but Laurana believes the message to be true and insists on making the exchange. Laurana, Flint, and Tas take Bakaris to the exchange site, where they are betrayed and forced to travel to Dargaard Keep. Once they near Dargaard Keep, Bakaris attempts to rape Laurana. Tasslehoff comes to her defense, stabbing Bakaris, and then Laurana is able to kill him. But then the death knight Lord Soth, one of Kitiara's most powerful allies, appears. Lord Soth subdues Laurana and carries the unconscious elfmaid off to Dargaard Keep. Flint and Tas are allowed to return to Kalaman to tell the people that the Golden General is now Kitiara's prisoner.

=== Reunited ===
Following their voyage into the whirlpool, Tanis and his companions, along with Berem the Everman (who reveals he only pretends to be mute) find themselves in the ancient city of Istar, which is underwater and now inhabited by sea elves who saved them from death. The companions meet the sea elf Apoletta and her husband, a red-robed human mage named Zebulah. At first Apoletta is reluctant to help the companions or allow them to return to the surface, when Tanis tells her of the Dragonarmies and demonstrates his unawareness of good dragons' existence, she realizes how dire the situation is and relents.

The companions wash up just outside Kalaman with only vague memories of the underwater city. Later, Kitiara returns to Kalaman and reveals that Laurana has been taken to the temple of Takhisis in Neraka. She demands unconditional surrender and that Berem the Everman must be delivered to her within three weeks or she will kill Laurana. Tanis resolves to go to Neraka with Berem and attempt to rescue Laurana, being accompanied by Caramon, Tika, Flint and Tasslehoff.

=== Rescue Mission ===
The companions depart for Neraka and meet up with Fizban and the golden dragon Pyrite (who "polymorphs" into a statue so that he can be carried for the trip). During the trip Flint dies of a heart attack. Fizban then departs. Berem finally decides to tell the companions his full story.

He explains that he and his sister named Jasla discovered a jeweled column, half-buried in the ground, one day several years after the Cataclysm. This was in fact the foundation stone of the Kingpriest's temple and it had landed there after being hurled through various planes of existence. Berem was overcome with greed and proceeded to pry one of the emeralds loose but Jasla sensed the sacred aura of the place. They struggled and Jasla died when she fell against the column. The Queen of Darkness herself then manifested and seared the emerald into Berem's chest as a reward for freeing her, revealing that this column is like a doorway to the Abyss. Jasla's pure spirit, however, remains with the column and blocks the Dark Majesty's escape, telling Berem to run as a new Temple of Takhisis is built around the site. Since that day, Takhisis's true goal has been to use the Everman to break his sister's enchantment upon the column and fully return to the world.

=== Neraka ===
The companions reach Neraka and the Temple of Takhisis, underneath which they know the column remains. When guards become suspicious of them, Tanis decides he is the riskiest prisoner to be discovered and needs to separate from the others. He quickly calls out to Kitiara nearby, who is parading atop her dragon in a ceremonial entrance into the city, and joins her, hoping to save Laurana while the others can surreptitiously take care of the column. Tanis tells Kit that he has come to offer himself in exchange for Laurana and that he is prepared to serve under her as an officer in the Dragonarmies. Kitiara seems to agree but actually intends for the elf maid to be tortured by Takhisis and given to Lord Soth to become his undead consort. By forcing him to witness this, Kitiara hopes to break Tanis once and for all and remold him to her liking.

Meanwhile, Gakhan realizes the true identities of the ones who arrived with Tanis. He finds the heroes beneath the Temple. When he tries to grab the Everman though, the weaponless Berem kills him and an alarm sounds. Berem hears his sister Jasla calling to him and sets off to find the jeweled column. Caramon follows the Everman while Tika and Tas run off in another direction to draw off pursuit.

Meanwhile, up above, the Grand Council of the Dragon Highlords has begun and Tanis marches into the grand chamber at the head of Kitiara's troops. Emperor Ariakas presides over the council, since he possesses the Crown of Power and, as Kitiara explains "whoever holds the crown rules". Ariakas and Kitiara's forces nearly come to blows over protocol until Takhisis herself arrives and imposes order.

Lord Soth carries in a body that has been wrapped from head to toe in winding cloth and places it at Kitiara's feet. Kitiara then cuts open the wrappings to reveal a nearly suffocated Laurana. The captive elfmaid staggers to her feet, and then Kitiara points out Tanis to her. To mask his true intentions from Takhisis, Tanis treats Laurana very coldly, disheartening her. Kitiara then presents Laurana as her gift to Takhisis and offers Tanis for service in the Dragonarmies. Takhisis is pleased by Kitiara's gift. She agrees to have Laurana tortured to death and her soul given to Lord Soth. She also accepts Tanis as an officer saying he needs only to lay his weapon at the feet of Emperor Ariakas to symbolize his allegiance. Tanis makes the long march up the stairs to the highest of the Dragon Highlords, who is both a warrior and a high-level magic-user. Instead of laying his sword at Ariakas' feet, Tanis reverses his stroke and kills the Highlord. A black-robed wizard standing next to Takhisis overcame the prismatic shields and wards surrounding Ariakas, allowing Tanis' blow to kill him.

=== Chaos and Escape ===
Tanis seizes the Crown of Power and attempts to exchange it for Laurana. Taking advantage of this distraction, Laurana breaks free and attacks Kitiara, disarming and knocking down the Highlord. Tanis tries to stop Laurana from running off on her own, but, after seeing him with Kitiara, Laurana no longer trusts him, so she shoves him off the platform. Laurana tells him she has to choose her own way—that she is not to be bargained for, or won, like an object. Amidst the chaos, Tanis drops the Crown, and all the Dragonarmy factions start fighting for it and the favor of Takhisis. In the confusion, the independent Laurana fights her way out of the chamber. Tanis chases after her. The goddess Takhisis suddenly disappears, distracted by something more important than the fight over the crown.

Deep beneath the temple, Caramon and Berem reach the chamber of the jeweled column, but are blocked by the sudden appearance of Raistlin. Caramon's brother is wearing robes of black, and had been the magic-user who had earlier disarmed Ariakas' defenses for Tanis. He explains that he allied himself with Takhisis to get greater power (and presumably to obtain the Key of Knowledge). Upon second thought, he decides to betray her and allows Berem to go to the jeweled column. The Everman throws himself upon the column and kills himself. As his spirit is reunited with his sister Jasla, the Dark Queen's doorway to the real world closes. As result, Raistlin has now taken away his two greatest rivals, Ariakas and Takhisis, and is now the single most powerful force of evil on Krynn. The Queen of Darkness is banished once more and her temple begins to collapse.

Believing he still owes some small debt to his brother and to Tika and Tasslehoff, Raistlin aids in their escape from Neraka. Raistlin then summons Cyan Bloodbane and flies away, but not before Caramon (who knows that his twin now walks the paths of darkest evil) makes a plea offer to accompany him. Raistlin refuses and tells his twin that they are now as the gods meant them to be, two whole and separate people.

Tanis finally catches up with Laurana, but before he can say much to her Kitiara arrives. She offers Tanis one last chance to join her as ruler of the Dragonarmies and warns him that Lord Soth is coming to collect Laurana. Tanis refuses and tells Kitiara that he will not only die for Laurana but that he will use his dying breath to ask Paladine to shield the elf maid's soul from Lord Soth. He says that, despite his transgressions, he knows that Paladine owes him and that it will be granted. Laurana then realizes Tanis has not become corrupted, and that he does love her. Kitiara then surprisingly tells the pair the location of the same exit that the other companions used. Tanis and Laurana flee just as Lord Soth enters the chamber and the Death Knight presents the Crown of Power to Kitiara. Kitiara reveals to Lord Soth she has in fact exacted her final revenge upon Tanis and Laurana, performing an act of mercy that will always keep her in Tanis' thoughts and poison his relationship with Laurana.

=== Endings and Epilogue ===
Exiting the city, Tanis and Laurana meet up with Fizban, Caramon, Tika and Tasslehoff. Fizban then reveals that he is really the god Paladine. Tanis also recognizes him now as the old man at the Inn who first spurred them into action by calling for the guards in Dragons of Autumn Twilight. Fizban tell the heroes that both the good and evil dragons will remain on Ansalon and that balance has been restored between good and evil.

Fizban explains to Caramon that the spirit who has helped Raistlin at times (and with whom Raistlin made a bargain in the Great Library) is the ancient evil wizard Fistandantilus. But he points out that Raistlin is not being possessed and chose his life and his actions all by himself.

The companions separate. Tasslehoff to travel to Kenderhome, Caramon and Tika to travel to Solace and Tanis and Laurana to travel to Kalaman.

In the epilogue, Raistlin travels to the Tower of High Sorcery in an abandoned neighborhood in the city of Palanthas, cursed and unoccupied since the end of the Cataclysm. He proclaims himself to be the master of past and present whose coming was foretold, is recognized by the spectral denizens of the tower, and settles into his new home.

== Connections to other books ==
The Dragonlance Legends trilogy is a sequel to the Chronicles and detail Raistlin's next plan to achieve even greater power than he already has. Fizban himself relates part of the plot of that story when he speaks to Tasslehoff about Flint. The Legends trilogy also goes into greater detail concerning the relationship between Raistlin and Fistandantilus and reveals the final fate of Kitiara.

== Comic ==
Following from the adaption of "Dark Elf Trilogy", the comic adaptation for Dragonlance Chronicles began with Dragons of Autumn Twilight in August 2005. NY Times best seller author Margaret Weis said: "We've all been waiting for this! I'm really impressed with Devil's Due and the quality of their artwork and storytelling. This is going to be a great project. I am so excited!" The first issue of last book of the trilogy Dragons of Spring Dawning was a moderate success ranking 187 in the top 300 comics for the March 2007 period. The latest issue #8 was ranked 206 in the top 300 comics for the February 2008 period.

Margaret Weis and Tracy Hickman along with Andrew Dabb adapted Dragons of Spring Dawning to a comic format, with Julius Gope as the artist. It has been slated for 12 issues by Devil's Due Publishing. Reviewer Ron Miller from indycomicreview.com reviewed the first issue awarded the comic 3 stars, but noting as the last book of trilogy it is a difficult starting point for new readers.

== Reception ==
In the Io9 series revisiting older Dungeons & Dragons novels, Rob Bricken commented that "I can certainly understand why it's beloved, but I can't in good conscience call Spring Dawning better than its predecessors. Thus, it rolls a 14 on its 1d20, below Winter Night's 17 and Autumn Twilight's 16, and same as the Forgotten Realms novel Shadowdale. It feels harsh but fair: Spring Dawning is a mostly good book that is permeated with small bits of atrocious plotting".

== Reviews ==
- Review by Laurel Anderson Tryforos (1985) in Fantasy Review, December 1985
- Review by Andy Sawyer (1986) in Paperback Inferno, #63

== See also ==
- Dragons of Autumn Twilight
- Dragons of Winter Night
- Dragons of Summer Flame
