= Tanis Half-Elven =

Tanthalas "Tanis Half-Elven"
- Dragonlance character
- First appearance: Dragons of Autumn Twilight (1984)
- Created by: Margaret Weis and Tracy Hickman

In-universe information
- Race: Half-elf
- Gender: Male
- Class: Fighter
- Home: Qualinost

Tanis Half-Elven is a fictional half-elven character in the Dragonlance series of books, which were published by TSR, and are now published by Wizards of the Coast. He is first introduced in the book Dragons of Autumn Twilight by Margaret Weis and Tracy Hickman, in Chapter 1: "Old Friends Meet. A Rude Interruption." They introduce him saying that he was half-elven, armed with a longbow and a sword and wearing leather armor.

== Character conception ==
As with the other protagonists of this trilogy, Tanis's first appearance was during a role-playing game session in which Tracy and Laura Hickman, Margaret Weis and Terry Phillips between others, set up the basic storyline of Dragonlance. In the beginning, Margaret Weis had problems picturing the correct representation of Tanis. Tracy Hickman finally told her, "He's James T. Kirk of the Starship Enterprise." After that explanation, Margaret had no more difficulty while writing about Tanis.

Dragons of Autumn Twilight explores the psychological conflicts that Tanis goes through because of his dual nature. Dragons of Winter Night involves Tanis dealing with his feelings from having been underground too long.

The novel Tanis, the Shadow Years by Barbara and Scott Siegel takes place during the five year time period before the Companions reunited at Solace. Tanis journeys into the memory of an old mage as his dying request, to search for the lost love of the old man and give her a chance to live on.

== Birth ==
Two accounts of Tanthalas Quisif-Nan Pah's (Tanis' elven name) birth exist. Both agree that Tanis was born in Qualinost. The first account is the Chronicles Trilogy, which states that Tanis was a product of rape. It is also described in the first chapter of Kindred Spirits. The violent nature of his conception, the nature of his birth, and the choice of his mother to die from shock after her assault all influenced the way the elves regarded Tanis and shaped his developmental years.

The second account of Tanis' origins is later presented in The Inheritance series. Here the story is elaborated on: his mother, Elansa Sungold, was originally kidnapped by Brand's brigands, however, she later fell in love with him, resulting in Tanis. At that time, Elansa was also married to the prince Kethrenan Kanan, and so the prince tried to "rescue" her from Brand. When she refused to leave, he fought Brand and they both died. Pregnant with Brand's child, Elansa goes back to Qualinost pretending she was raped to protect her and Tanis.

== Early life ==
The orphaned Tanis was taken in by his mother's husband's brother, the elf king, Solostaran. Solostaran raised Tanis alongside his own children, Porthios, Gilthanas and Laurana Kanan, Tanis felt isolated growing up as a half-human amongst the elves and was only really close to Gilthanas and Laurana, Tanis became romantically involved with Laurana who gave him a promise ring that pledged her to marry him, when Laurana's family discovered how serious Laurana's infatuation with Tanis had become they angrily confronted him as they did not consider a bastard half-elf a suitable match for an elven princess. This fight led to the end of the friendship between Tanis and Gilthanas, as Tanis decided to leave Qualinost.

Tanis traveled to the nearby town of Solace where he began to work for the dwarven metalsmith Flint Fireforge. Tanis had met Flint years earlier when the dwarf had come to Qualinost to craft items for Solostaran and the two had developed a friendship.

Tanis met Tasslehoff Burrfoot (Tas) when the light-fingered kender tried to steal one of Flint's bracelets. Tanis kept Flint from killing Tas and soon Tas was an inseparable companion.

Tanis met Kitiara when he believed he was going to her rescue as she fought a band of hobgoblins, only to find she was toying with her assailants. There was an immediate attraction between the two and Tanis was soon involved in a romantic relationship with the fiery human woman. Tanis did this despite the fact that Laurana still believed she and Tanis were engaged to be married.

Through Kitiara, Tanis met her two half-brothers, Raistlin and Caramon Majere, and their friend, Sturm Brightblade. Together these seven (Tanis, Flint, Tas, Kitiara, Raistlin, Caramon and Sturm) formed a group known as the Innfellows and they adventured together for many years before finally separating for five years to go in search of evidence of the old gods of Krynn.

== Role in the War of the Lance ==
In the first chapter of Dragons of Autumn Twilight, Tanis meets up with the companions five years after they had split to find proof of the true gods. He is their assumed leader. On his way into the Inn, Tanis meets up with Flint and Tas. They encounter Fewmaster Toede, who sets his goblins upon them. They fight them off, but are disturbed at their peaceful town of Solace being controlled by the Highseekers and the goblin patrols. When they get to the Inn of the Last Home, the companions discuss things. In short, none have found any proof of the true gods. In addition, Kitiara has left a letter saying she will not be there. However, upon assembling in the Inn, they encounter Sturm, who has with him two barbarian plainspeople, Goldmoon and Riverwind. The woman, Goldmoon, carries a Blue Crystal Staff, which Toede had mentioned to Tanis. An old man there also tells a story of Huma Dragonbane and the White Stag. Goldmoon sings an enchanting song, which just about starts a riot. The companions, now joined by Goldmoon and Riverwind, leave the Inn under Tanis's guidance to prevent capture. They travel to Darken Wood, from there to Que-Shu, and then to Xak Tsaroth where they encounter Khisanth (Onyx), who guards the Disks of Mishakal. Khisanth was the first dragon Tanis ever sees, as well as the first black dragon introduced in the Chronicles Trilogy. Upon returning to Solace, Tanis and the others are captured by Toede and sent in slave caravans to Pax Tharkas. They escape and flee with a party of elves to Qualinesti.

Tanis is then reunited with his childhood sweetheart, the elven princess Laurana. Laurana is still in love with Tanis and wants to marry him. Tanis however rejects Laurana, telling her that he is in love with the human woman Kitiara. Later that evening, the Qualinesti Speaker of the Sun Solostaran tells Tanis and his companions how the Red Dragonarmy is about to invade Qualinesti and the only hope for the elves is for Tanis's group to sneak into the occupied fortress of Pax Tharkas, by way of the Sla-Mori, to free the slaves there. Such an uprising will delay the Dragonarmy long enough for the elves to evacuate Qualinesti. Tanis agrees to accept this mission.

In the Sla-Mori, the companions encounter a great slug monster that melts Tanis's sword, when he was momentarily distracted by Laurana, who had followed them. Tanis was then given Wyrmslayer by Kith-Kanan, the ancient elven king who founded the kingdom of Qualinesti. Tanis then angrily rebukes Laurana for following them and endangering the mission. The companions enter Pax Tharkas and free the slaves. They do battle with Dragon Highlord Verminaard, who is slain by Tanis and Sturm with the help of Goldmoon.

Afterward, the companions recover the Hammer of Kharas and give it to the refugees, who trade it to the dwarves in exchange for safe haven in Thorbardin. Tanis also begins to feel a renewed attraction to Laurana, who has become much more mature since leaving Qualinesti. However, Tanis again quarrels with Laurana due to his jealousy of her close friendship with the cleric of Paladine, Elistan, who Laurana is helping lead the refugees. Tanis leads the companions off to Tarsis, where the dragons attack. Tanis, Raistlin, Caramon, Tika, Goldmoon, and Riverwind split off with the others after being rescued from Tarsis by the Silvanesti elf princess Alhana Starbreeze, who forces them to go to Silvanesti with her to free her father, King Lorac, from the dream and the dragon orb. Tanis loses Wyrmslayer at this point. They enter the dream and most of them die (only in the dream, they live in real life). Tanis lives because of his love of Laurana, and Raistlin because of his ambition.

From here they head to Port Balifor and then to Flotsam. Here, Tanis disguises himself as a Dragonarmy officer and is discovered by Kitiara, who has become the Dragon Highlord of blue dragons. He briefly had a relationship with her, then fled Flotsam on the Perechon with the others and sank in the Maelstrom with Berem, the Green Gemstone Man that is the target of Kitiara's secret mission. He finds himself in the sunken city of Istar, where he meets sea elves, particularly Apoletta, and Zebulah, who is a human whose magic allows him to breathe underwater and lives with the sea elves. The companions are sent to Kalaman afterwards. There Tanis meets up with Flint and Tasslehoff and learns that Laurana has been captured by Kitiara, who used the elfwoman's love for Tanis to lure her into a cunning trap.

Tanis, Flint, Tas, Caramon, Tika, and Berem go to Neraka, to rescue Laurana. Flint dies on the way there, suffering a heart attack. At Neraka, the remaining group is captured and treated as deserters, but Tanis, seeing Kitiara enter into the city, takes a great risk and escapes from the guards, calling out for Kitiara's help. He falls into the charade of being her officer, and she accepts him up onto her dragon, however she does not see the others, so she believes Tanis is alone. He then makes an exchange for Laurana, offering himself. He tells Kitiara he will serve under her in Bakaris's stead. She accepts, and brings him to the meeting of the Dragon Highlord's to be presented to the Dark Queen though in fact Kitiara plans to betray Tanis as she has already promised Laurana's soul to the death knight, Lord Soth.

At the meeting, it is revealed that Toede is dead, slain by the kender in their homeland. Laurana is then carried in by Lord Soth and roughly handled by Kitiara who presents the captured elf woman to the Dark Queen. Laurana remains defiant though and Tanis, seeing her courage and beauty, finally realizes it is Laurana he loves not Kitiara. Tanis realizes though that he must hide these feelings if he is to have any chance of rescuing Laurana, so he treats her coldly, letting her think he is willingly serving Kitiara. Prior to the meeting, Kit told Tanis he would be presented before the Queen and could ask her for a favor in the form of escorting Laurana to the prison, after which he could sneak her out to the gates and free her. However, when Tanis kneels before the Dark Queen, he is so overwhelmed he cannot speak, and she commands him to present his sword before Ariakas, a part of the plan he did not know of. Kitiara insisted on him going, and on the way there Tanis convinces himself (barely) to kill Ariakas. However, he discovers a magical shield in the way; Raistlin is present and breaks the shield, allowing Tanis to plunge the sword through Ariakas and kill him. Tanis then makes a grab for the Crown of Power which Ariakas wore; Soth attempts to take it as well. During the struggle, horns blare, creating silence all round the chamber. Kitiara calls to Tanis, telling him to bring her the crown and ordering Lord Soth to escort him to her. Tanis then tells Kit she will only get the crown in exchange for Laurana. Kit allows him to free Laurana, but Laurana refuses to go with him. Instead Laurana attacks Kitiara, stealing Kit's weapon and knocking the Highlord down. Laurana then pushes Tanis off the ledge when he tries to stop her from running off. This causes Tanis to drop the crown and a huge fight breaks out.

Tanis chases after Laurana as she fights her way out of the temple. He finally catches up to her but then so does Kitiara who again offers to let Tanis rule alongside her and warns him that Lord Soth is coming to collect Laurana. Tanis refuses Kit's offer, telling Kitiara he will protect Laurana with his life. Kitiara then allows Tanis and Laurana to flee, and they escape Neraka.

== After the war ==
In approximately the year 353 AC, Tanis takes Laurana as his bride and she bears a son, Gilthas. Laurana and Tanis have a castle near Solanthus. Tanis becomes a widely known and popular figure on Ansalon. So heroic was he in the War of the Lance he is proclaimed by the Knights of Solamnia an honorary Knight of the Rose, a rank normal knights must strive for years to obtain. He is presented with a breastplate by the Knights as well. The Medallion of Kharas and a green silk sash, from the mountain dwarves and Wildrunners, respectively, are also awarded to him.

Tanis is summoned to Palanthas some three years after his marriage and is told of Raistlin Majere's plan to destroy Takhisis and take her place as head god of evil. In addition, he receives the news of Kitiara's planned attack on Palanthas. Tasslehoff Burrfoot travels to an alternate time line and reads about Lord Soth killing Tanis in battle. Luckily, Tasslehoff intervenes and saved Tanis from Soth by convincing him not to fight. Tanis instead enters the Tower of High Sorcery along with Caramon and is able to save Dalamar from Kitiara, who is, at the time, mortally wounded. Kit pledges her love to Tanis here and asks him, in her words, to "keep him away". Lord Soth appears soon after. Tanis allows him to take Kitiara's body and finally breaks away from her, in heart and soul.

Tanis and Laurana then become emissaries between Qualinesti, Silvanesti and the Knights of Solamnia. Their intent is to forge an alliance between them, a united front that would stand strong for years. At this time, Sturm's son, Steel, has gone to the side of evil and Caramon requests Tanis's help in bringing him back to their side. They manage to bring to Steel to the High Clerist's Tower, but he will not leave the Knights of Takhisis. Tanis then attempts to tell the people of this order of knights, but few believe him. Tanis later returns to Qualinesti in an effort to save his son from the elves, who have made his son the next Speaker of the Suns. He does not manage to achieve that, but he does manage the rescue of Alhana Starbreeze. Tanis is then forbidden to return to Qualinesti.

== The Chaos War ==
Tanis is still continuing his struggle to unite the nations when the Chaos War descends upon Krynn. He journeys to the High Clerist's Tower and defends it from the Knights of Takhisis and the Tarmaks. He saves Steel Brightblade's life there, upholding the promise he made to the spirit of Sturm Brightblade. An unknown Tarmak kills Tanis by stabbing him in the back with a sword. The exact date is unknown, around summer, 383AC. Tanis is buried in the Tomb of the Last Heroes in Solace.

== Family ==
Tanis is a half-elf. In his childhood (the first forty or fifty years of his life) he is raised in the court of the Speaker of the Sun, along with Gilthanas, Porthios, and Laurana. Gilthanas was once like a brother to him, but years of separation and several events have led to a separation between them. They are not openly hostile to each other, but they are far from brothers now. He leaves Qualinesti fifty years prior to the War of the Lance because he does not agree with the elves on various subjects. He is married to the princess of the Qualinesti Laurana Kanan (eventually disgusted with Kitiara after what she's done and deciding Laurana was the better choice) and father to Gilthas Pathfinder who takes over as elf king and led the elves to rebel in the fifth age against their human captors. Solostaran Kanan, Speaker of the Sun in the War of the Lance, is legally his uncle and, once marrying Laurana, a father-in-law. Gilthanas and Porthios are his brothers-in-law. Alhana Starbreeze, by marriage to Porthios, is his sister-in-law. Silvanoshei, son of Porthios and Alhana, is technically his nephew.

Cael Ironstaff once claimed to be the son of Tanis, who Cael claimed had had relations with one of the sea elves. This is unconfirmed, though Caelthas once had a red beard similar to Tanis's.

Brand	Elansa Sungold	Kethrenan	Solostaran	?
Tanis Half-Elven	Laurana	Gilthanas	Porthios	Alhana Starbreeze
Gilthas Pathfinder	Kerianseray	Silvanoshei
Balifaris

== Appearance and traits ==
He is about six feet in height, with a medium-large frame. He has tan skin, green eyes, and grows a red beard just before the War of the Lance. His long hair is of the same color. He has deep, brooding eyes. Tanis is usually calm and honest. He seldom lies, only when imperative to his survival. Caramon Majere respects him greatly. Tanis has never completed the elven rite of adulthood. The languages he can speak are Camptalk, Qualinesti and Silvanesti elven, a little dwarven, and even goblin. Of course, he also speaks Common. His red beard is a cause, initially, of enmity between him and Gilthanas Kanan, who claims Tanis is "flaunting his human heritage".

Tanis is a half-elf, a curse and a blessing. He can grow his beard and hide his ears in order to pass off as human, or shave and allow his ears to be seen to pass as an elf. However, those elves that know the truth about him call him "half-breed" and believe him to be less. A few elves do not care, among them Laurana. Humans who know of the half-elf heritage (few outside of the companions) seem to care much less than elves. Tanis states, "According to humans, half an elf is but part of a whole being. Half a man is a cripple."

== Role amongst the companions ==
Tanis is extremely skilled at fighting. However, he has taken on the elven state of mind that killing is wrong. He detests fighting, but whereas the elves believe that life should be preserved, Tanis believes that there are times when killing is needed, such as the battle with Verminaard. Also, Laurana, his bride, takes on a similar hardened stance even though she is a pure-blooded elf. This may have emerged from the sudden shock that she was given after she chased Tanis into the Sla-Mori. She went from elf-maiden to warrior in a matter of hours. Gilthanas, Tanis's cousin to some extent, seems also to have this state of mind, as does Porthios.

Tanis is commonly mistaken for a ranger due to his lightly armored appearance and weapons of choice, though second edition Dragonlance game materials list him as a fighter (as his constitution score does not meet the ranger's minimum). He is an accomplished swordsman and a skilled archer. A notable weapon of his, the Wyrmslayer, was given to him by the dead Elven King Kith-Kanan. Tanis is a brilliant leader and tactician. His human companions often looked to him for advice, making him the reluctant leader of the group which became the Heroes of the Lance.

== Other media ==
=== Video games ===
Tanis appears as one of the player characters in Advanced Dungeons & Dragons: Heroes of the Lance.

=== Miniature figures ===
Tanis was included in Ral Partha's Dragonlance Heroes boxed figures set of lead miniatures. A reviewer for Dragon magazine complimented the work Ral Partha did in matching the appearance of their figures to the descriptions of the characters from the novels, and described his figure: "He reaches across his shoulder with his right hand to grab an arrow from his quiver. His cloak goes from shoulder to floor and is held by a simple clasp. Tanis is dressed as a typical ranger in leathers and fur-lined shirt and boots. The vest has a design worked into it, as does his dagger scabbard. The belt has a pouch attached. Tanis's face is finely chiseled with a neatly groomed beard, although he appears gaunt. His left hand clutches his bow."

=== Film ===
American television and film actor, Michael Rosenbaum is the voice of Tanis in the animated Dragonlance: Dragons of Autumn Twilight film.

== Reception ==
Jason Heller, of The A.V. Club, notes that the group of adventurers are "led by a half-elf fighter named Tanis, a man torn between his human and elven heritages, because of course he would have to be—who become enmeshed in a battle against the forces of evil striving to take over the dual-mooned, pseudo-medieval world of Krynn and rule it as only the forces of evil could."

Lauren Davis of io9 notes that while the heroes of the series "are searching for truth, each of these individuals is deeply flawed", and that Tanis "is consumed by his inability to fit completely into either the human or elven worlds".

In the Io9 series revisiting older Dungeons & Dragons novels, Rob Bricken commented that "A bastard (in the technical sense) half-elf who doesn't truly belong in the world of either race; he's a capable leader of the group although he's often plagued by self-doubt. He left Qualinesti, a land of elves, because their leader's daughter Laurana was in love with him and her father was having none of it. He's currently in love with a swordswoman named Kitiara, who's the half-sister of Caramon and Raistlin."

Bricken later commented that "Tanis' self-loathing [in Spring Dawning] is a lot more palatable when he has concrete reasons for it, namely the fact he begins the novel literally sleeping with the enemy, and I think his twisted relationship with Kitiara feels authentically self-destructive. It makes his character arc more satisfying, and it pays off well in the story's final act, when he uses his toxic relationship to rejoin the forces of evil in hopes of freeing Laurana."
