= Laurana =

Laurana may refer to:

- Francesco Laurana (c. 1430 – c. 1502), Dalmatian-born sculptor and medalist
- Luciano Laurana (c. 1420–1479), Italian architect and engineer
- Laurana Kanan, a fictional character from the Dragonlance fantasy series

See also

- Lovran, Croatia (Italian: Laurana)
