= Dragons of Winter Night =

1985 novel by Margaret Weis and Tracy Hickman

- Cover of the first edition
- Authors: Margaret Weis; Tracy Hickman
- Cover artist: Larry Elmore
- Language: English
- Series: Dragonlance Chronicles
- Genre: Fantasy literature
- Publisher: Random House
- Publication date: July 1985
- Publication place: United States
- Media type: Print (hardcover, paperback)
- Pages: 399 (paperback)
- ISBN: 0-88038-174-4
- OCLC: 12251953
- Preceded by: Dragons of Autumn Twilight
- Followed by: Dragons of Spring Dawning

Dragons of Winter Night is a fantasy novel by Margaret Weis and Tracy Hickman. Based on the Dungeons & Dragons gaming modules, it is the second book in the Chronicles Trilogy, preceded by Dragons of Autumn Twilight and followed by Dragons of Spring Dawning. It was the second Dragonlance novel, being released in 1985. It is the second novel in the Dragonlance Chronicles trilogy, which along with the Legends Trilogy introduces the Dragonlance world. Specifically, it details the darker days of the War of the Lance.

The novel is part of the beginning of the entire series. It departs from the original game session that Dragons of Autumn Twilight was based upon, but is still based on the events of the previous novel. It continues upon many of the most important characters, the Heroes of the Lance. According to the Dragonlance Nexus, the Chronicles Trilogy is essential to setting up the foundation for the rest of the novels.

== Development ==
To describe the scene in which the city of Tarsis is destroyed by dragons, Margaret Weis studied World War II films of the bombing of London.

During the scene in which most of the characters are killed in a dream, Margaret Weis references Othello by William Shakespeare, with Caramon speaking the phrase: "No, you're wrong, Tanis. I sent him away".

== Plot ==
The novel begins with the Companions assembled in the major dwarven city of Thorbardin, where the refugees of Pax Tharkas are presenting the dwarves with the Hammer of Kharas, a legendary warhammer wielded by the dwarven hero Kharas, in return for refuge in the city.

The refugees of Pax Tharkas, freed from the Dragon Highlord Verminaard, are on an intermittent stay before finding a new home in Thorbardin, ruled by the dwarves, who have agreed to house them temporarily. The Companions are sent to Tarsis, a supposed city by the sea, in order to find a permanent home for the refugees. Upon arriving, they discover that the city, which became landlocked after the Cataclysm, has turned from a thriving port into a ramshackle town. Whilst in Tarsis, the heroes meet the Silvanesti princess, Alhana Starbreeze and a small group of Knights of Solamnia led by Derek Crownguard. The heroes also learn of the existence of Dragon Orbs, ancient magical artifacts capable of controlling dragons. The city is then attacked by dragons and completely destroyed. During the attack, the party is split: Tanis Half-Elven, Riverwind, Goldmoon, Caramon, Raistlin and Tika are rescued by Alhana Starbreeze while Sturm Brightblade, Flint Fireforge, Tasslehoff Burrfoot, Gilthanas, Laurana Kanan and Elistan escape with Derek Crownguard and his knights.

Tanis's group flees on the backs of griffins with Alhana to Silvanesti, the ancient elven homeland. They find it has been ravaged by a nightmare manifested into reality, brought on by King Lorac when he attempted to use a dragon orb. Most of the heroes present, but also Sturm, Flint, Tas and Laurana, experience visions of their death. The only two members of the party to "survive" and reach the Tower of Stars are Tanis and Raistlin. Eventually, Raistlin defeats the green dragon Cyan Bloodbane, who has been manipulating the dream onto the land, and the party escapes the dream. They retrieve the Dragon Orb held in Silvanesti.

The group led by Sturm travels to Icewall Glacier, located in the far south, where Laurana killed the White Dragon Highlord Feal-Thas, and recovered a second Dragon Orb. While sailing towards the Knights' base on Sancrist isle, they are attacked by the white dragon, Sleet. Laurana drives off Sleet by shooting the dragon in the wing, but the heroes are shipwrecked on Southern Ergoth, an island south of Sancrist inhabited by native wild elves (the Kagonesti) and refugees from both the Qualinesti and Silvanesti nations. Upon making landfall, the group is confronted by a force of Silvanesti elves. The Silvanesti surprisingly knock Gilthanas unconscious, and a battle nearly breaks out between the two groups before Laurana is able to defuse the situation. The Silvanesti then bring forth a Kagonesti Elf named Silvara, who heals Gilthanas, and escort the group to Qualimori, the refugee city established by the Qualinesti elves. It becomes evident that tensions are high between the three groups of elves: the Silvanesti and Qualinesti are ancient rivals and refugees, and both nations consider themselves above the "wild" Kagonesti, who are native to Southern Ergoth and whose lands they are occupying.

The reunion of the heroes with the Qualinesti does not go well. Laurana is publicly snubbed and insulted by her family, and the Qualinesti imprison all of the non-elves in the group and seize the Dragon Orb. Realizing that the Qualinesti will not use the Dragon Orb for anyone but themselves, Laurana, with the help of Gilthanas, Silvara and an imprisoned human blacksmith, Theros Ironfield, steal the Dragon Orb and free the rest of the heroes. The group then flees Qualimori.

Aggressively pursued by the elves, tension grows between Derek and Sturm when Sturm refuses Derek's order to attack the elves. The heroes eventually decide to split the party with Derek and Sturm taking the orb on to Sancrist while the rest of the group lures away the pursuing elves. Silvara guides this group to the tomb of the legendary hero Huma Dragonbane. There they meet the enigmatic, bumbling wizard Fizban (who was presumed dead). Silvara reveals the great secret that she is a silver dragon, and agrees to aid the party in forging Dragonlances, which will be necessary in turning the tide against the Dragonarmies.

The focus goes back to Tanis's group travelling to the port city of Flotsam. The adventurers pose as a traveling magic show, with Raistlin the star magician, and are able to make some money and escape undue attention. En route, Raistlin gains power over, and masters the use of, the Dragon Orb he obtained in Silvanost.

By this time, Sturm and Derek have reached Sancrist with the Dragon Orb. Derek brings charges of dishonor against Sturm for his failure to obey orders, but due to one of the leading knights, Lord Gunthar Uth Wistan, personally pleading his honor on Sturm's good character, Sturm is allowed to become a full Knight of Solamnia in the Order of the Crown. Sturm is also made third in command of the Solamnic Knight force being sent to defend the High Clerist's Tower in Solamnia behind Derek and the Knight of the Sword, Lord Alfred Markenin. The Tower guards a narrow pass in the mountains and is the primary avenue of defense for the rich city of Palanthas, but the citizens of Palanthas believe the Dragonarmies will leave them alone and thus provide little support, either in terms of men or supplies, for the defending Knights.

The Whitestone Council is convened to try to form an alliance to fight the Dragonarmies. The council quickly descends into chaos between the "allies" as the elves threaten war against the knights unless the Dragon Orb is returned to them. Finally, to stop the bickering, Tas shatters the Dragon Orb by throwing it against the Whitestone. Amidst the confusion, Theros Ironfield demonstrates the power of a newly forged Dragonlance by shattering the Whitestone with it. The stunned allies grudgingly agree to start working together.

Back on the mainland, Laurana and Flint testify on behalf of Sturm Brightblade before the knights, leading to him being fully exonerated of all the charges Derek brought against him. Lord Gunthar is so impressed by Laurana that he asks her to travel to the High Clerist's Tower to bring the news that Sturm has been cleared and to deliver the new Dragonlances to the knights. Laurana feels that Gunthar is using Sturm to further his own ambition but still agrees to go for Sturm's sake.

On the other side of Ansalon, Tanis and company are staying in an inn in the disreputable city of Flotsam. The city streets are dangerous: it has been overrun by the Blue Dragonarmy and a large portion of the army is present in the town, occupying every bar and inn. Tanis and Caramon, in an effort to blend in, steal the armor of two Dragonarmy officers. As Tanis wanders the streets, he is attacked by a deranged elf in a back alley. Suddenly, he is rescued by Kitiara, the fiery human woman that is Tanis's ex-lover and half-sister of Raistlin and Caramon. Kitiara has risen to the rank of Dragon Highlord, leading the Blue Dragonarmy. Tanis, stunned, lies to prevent the capture of the rest of the group and claims he is a new officer under her command. She escorts Tanis to her quarters and the two resume their love affair.

Meanwhile, the Knights of Solamnia (along with Laurana, Flint, and Tas) have fortified the High Clerist's Tower. They are greatly outnumbered by the besieging Blue Dragonarmy and are low on supplies. Morale within the Tower is low; the vindication of Sturm has led to a split between the low-ranking Knights of the Crown and the higher ranks, led by Derek and Markenin. Derek's grip on reality also appears to be slipping. Finally, as supplies near their end, an increasingly desperate Derek orders a frontal assault on the encamped Dragonarmy, stating that they will flee before the charging knights. Sturm, believing this to be suicide, refuses the order and does not permit his Knights of the Crown accompany the attack. Derek and Markenin carry out the attack with most of the garrison and are promptly slaughtered. Bakaris, the ranking Dragonarmy commander, brings the headless body of Lord Alfred and a dying Derek up to the tower and starts to taunt the few remaining defenders when he is silenced by Laurana shooting him in the arm.

The Blue Dragonarmy attacks the tower in force the next day but is repulsed by the few remaining knights. Still, Sturm knows this is only a temporary victory as now the enemy will bring their dragons up to attack the tower. Meanwhile, deep within the recesses of the Tower, Tas has found yet another Dragon Orb and realizes that the unusual architecture of the tower is designed as an elaborate dragontrap, designed to lure dragons into a center chamber in the tower and slay them. The dragons attack, overwhelming the defenders with dragonfear. Sturm manages to stall them for a short time but is killed by Kitiara. Inside the tower, Laurana successfully controls the Dragon Orb, which lures two blue dragons inside the traps, where the Knights slay them using their Dragonlances. Kitiara wheels her Dragon away and escapes the call of the orb. The Dragon Orb also drives all the attacking draconians insane, causing the advancing Blue Dragonarmy, which had been on the cusp of victory, to collapse into utter chaos. Afterwards, Laurana goes out to protect the body of Sturm and is confronted by her romantic rival, Kitiara. Kitiara informs Laurana that Tanis is with her, then departs. Sturm is buried in the chambers below the Tower, eulogized by a bitter and angry Laurana, and honored by all the survivors of all embodied by the Knights. The novel ends with Alhana Starbreeze burying her father in Silvanesti and departing back to her people, still refugees.

== Characters ==
- Tanis Half-Elven, a half-elf and de facto leader of the companions.
- Sturm Brightblade, a squire to the Knights of Solamnia and deeply honorable man.
- Goldmoon, daughter of the chief of the Que-Shu tribe, bearer of the Blue Crystal Staff, and first true cleric of good since the Cataclysm.
- Riverwind, bodyguard and romantic interest of Goldmoon.
- Caramon Majere, huge, muscular, sometimes slow-thinking warrior, with a deep affection for his brother.
- Raistlin Majere, a sarcastic, cynical, frail mage of the Red Robes, and the twin brother of Caramon.
- Flint Fireforge, a gruff old dwarf and old friend of Tanis.
- Tasslehoff Burrfoot, a happy-go-lucky, innocent, and genial kender.
- Laurana Kanan, incredibly beautiful elven princess and romantic interest of Tanis.
- Tika Waylan, a red-haired beauty and barmaid.
- Gilthanas Kanan, elven fighter-mage prince and brother of Laurana.
- Fizban, a muddled old wizard.
- Elistan, chief priest of Paladine.
- Kitiara, the Blue Dragon Highlord and romantic interest of Tanis.

== Reception ==
In the Io9 series revisiting older Dungeons & Dragons novels, Rob Bricken commented that "damned if Winter Night doesn't still transcend so many of its flaws, I can't help but rank it only slightly below Dragons of Autumn Twilight. It's messier but far more ambitious, and even if character growth suffers (minus Laurana) the character development feels richer, even if it's just because they aren't sitting around hating each other all time. That means Dragons of Winter Night rolls a 17 on its 1d20—but since it doesn't have the -2 penalty for focusing so much on gully dwarves, this means it's a point higher than its predecessor".

== Reviews ==
- The V.I.P. of Gaming Magazine #3 (April/May 1986)
- Review by Andy Sawyer (1986) in Paperback Inferno, #62

== See also ==
- Dragons of Summer Flame

== Sources ==
- Weis, Margaret; Hickman, Tracy (2000). Dragons of Winter Night: Chronicles vol. II. Wizards of the Coast. ISBN 0-7869-1609-5.
