= Riverwind =

- Dragonlance character
- Goldmoon and Riverwind. Illustration by Keith Parkinson.
- First appearance: Dragons of Autumn Twilight (1984)
- Created by: Margaret Weis and Tracy Hickman
- Voiced by: Phil LaMarr (2008 animated film)

In-universe information
- Alias: Riverwind of the Que Shu
- Race: Nomad
- Gender: Male
- Class: Fighter (Barbarian)
- Home: Que Shu

Riverwind (also known as Riverwind of the Que Shu tribe or Riverwind of the Que Shu) is a fictional character appearing in the Dragonlance series of Dungeons & Dragons role-playing game supplements and novels, created by Margaret Weis and Tracy Hickman and published by TSR (and later by Wizards of the Coast).

Riverwind made his first public appearance in the first novel of the original Chronicles Trilogy, Dragons of Autumn Twilight, in 1984. However, the character's proper creation was during a tabletop role-playing game session where Tracy and Laura Hickman, Margaret Weis and Terry Phillips, between others, developed the basic storyline of Dragonlance.

Throughout the series, Riverwind became a well known character and, in 14 years, authors made him the protagonist in two novels, Riverwind the Plainsman (1990) and Spirit of the Wind (1998).

== Introduction ==
Patrick Lucien Price, author of the "Bertrem's essay on numerology" short story, published in Leaves from the Inn of the Last Home (1987), describes Riverwind as a character that demands change, seeks variety and new opportunities to develop himself, also a natural leader of men and generous, impressionable, a humanitarian.

Few facts are given about the early life of the character itself, a shepherd living just outside the village of Que Shu, a barbarian settlement in Ansalon, in the fictional world of Krynn. Laura Hickman and Kate Novak detail, in the short story "Heart of Goldmoon" published in the Love and War (1987) recompilation, Riverwind's faith in the ancient gods and especially in Mishakal, goddess of healing, although the common belief in the tribe was that the high priestess's ancestors become gods. Margaret Weis and Tracy Hickman give a reason in the short story "True Knight", published in The Cataclysm (1992) recompilation, as Riverwind's family is not a native from the Que Shu tribe, but instead his ancestors, Michael, a cleric of Mishakal, and Nikol, daughter of a knight, travelled to the plains shortly after the Cataclysm, the event in which the gods threw a fiery mountain to punish Krynn arrogance, and kept practicing their religion.

In "Heart of Goldmoon", Hickman and Novak also inform the reader about the journey to the Hall of the Sleeping Spirits, in which Riverwind acts as a bodyguard to Goldmoon, protecting her life when Hollow-sky, the other bodyguard traveling with them, tries to force her to marry him. With Riverwind and Goldmoon declaring their mutual love, the story ends with Riverwind affirming his intention to request a Courting quest, which would give him the right to marry Goldmoon.

Paul B. Thompson and Tonya C. Cook give details of such quest in the novel Riverwind the Plainsman (1990), which takes place in the five years before the Companions were reunited at Solace. According to Thompson, in contrast to some characters in the series, "Riverwind wasn't fully developed in the earlier books. We essentially had a character and had to make up a lot of background for him". The character, needing to find proof that the ancient gods existed, travels to Xak Tsaroth and retrieves the Blue Crystal Staff, a holy relic blessed by Mishakal herself, guarded by Khisanth, a black dragon. Although the novel ends with the delivery of the staff, in Dragons of Autumn Twilight (1984) the authors explain, through Goldmoon, that the tribe tried to stone him when he could not explain how the staff could prove the existence of the old gods. However, before they started stoning, Goldmoon embraced him, and both vanished from the tribe.

Character art for Riverwind was first created by Larry Elmore. According to Elmore, Margaret Weis appreciated Keith Parkinson's attempt to incorporate Weis's vision of Goldmoon as "Native American with a Celtic touch".

== Development through the series ==
=== Chronicles Trilogy ===
As in the "Heart of Goldmoon" short story, Riverwind is given the role of Goldmoon's protector in Dragons of Autumn Twilight (1984). Margaret Weis and Tracy Hickman kept his involvement at a minimum, only describing him as a character with a serious demeanor. The War of the Lance sourcebook (2004) indicates that he is a man of few words, proud and wary of strangers, who does not make friends easily and people have to go a long way to earn his regard. It is only after Sturm Brightblade—Squire of the Knights of Solamnia and one of the members of a group of friends who met them in Solace—feels his honor has been insulted that Riverwind's behavior is modified, becoming somewhat friendlier. He is particularly distrustful of those not of human race or magic users, and so Raistlin earned his constant mistrust while he was surprised the first time Tanis was introduced as the leader of the Companions.

Understandably, it is in battle sequences where the authors give him more protagonism, effectively drawing on his past as a trained warrior. It is in one of those sequences, against the black dragon Khisanth in Xak Tsaroth, where Riverwind is mortally wounded by the dragons' acid breath. However, Goldmoon, after meeting the soul of her mother and the goddess Mishakal, goddess of healing, is able to restore him to health.

It is at the end of the first book, when Riverwind marries Goldmoon just outside Pax Tharkas after defeating Lord Verminaard, that Riverwind receives more attention from the authors.

Weis and Hickman continue diminishing the protagonism of Riverwind in Dragons of Winter Night (1985). In the second half of Dragons of Spring Dawning (1985), the authors reveal that Goldmoon is pregnant, and the couple decides to stay in Kalaman, ending their participation in the Chronicles Trilogy.

=== Lost Chronicles Trilogy ===
In Dragons of the Dwarven Depths, Tanis leaves Riverwind in charge of the safety of the refugees from Pax Tharkas while the rest of the companions search for an entrance to the underground dwarven kingdom of Thorbardin. Riverwind oversees the refugees as they evacuate to Thorbardin ahead of an attack by the remnants of the Red Dragonarmy.

=== Legends Trilogy ===
As the Legends trilogy, written by Margaret Weis and Tracy Hickman in 1986, focuses on the twins Caramon and Raistlin Majere, Riverwind's appearance is small. In Time of the Twins (1986) Riverwind visits Caramon and Tika Majere at the Inn of the Last Home to refuse to escort Lady Crysania to the Tower of High Sorcery of Wayreth and to inform them that his son, Wanderer, is already three years old, and the birth of his twin daughters, Moonsong and Brightdawn.

By wearing the Mantle of the Chieftain, the authors point that he has been named Chieftain of the Que Shu and a number of other tribes like the Que Teh and Que Kiri, which must mean that he was successful in bringing peace.

=== Chaos War series ===
There are no books about the attacks of Chaos's armies to the Abanasinian tribes. Chris Pierson's novel, Spirit of the Wind (1998), informs that the Knights of Takhisis, knights under the service of Takhisis, goddess of evil, invaded the area bringing brutes, barbarians from northern isles, forcing some tribes to join the Que Shu village to repel the attack, while others separated and left for the mountains. He also hints that at least shadow wights, creatures that possess souls, vanishing them from the world of Krynn, including others' memories of them, attacked the tribe, as Moonsong and Brightdawn explain that their brother, Wanderer, has a three-year-old son, but nobody, not even Wanderer himself, remembers his mother.

=== Age of Mortals series ===
In Spirit of the Wind (1998), Chris Pierson covers the last weeks of Riverwind's life. Afflicted by a terminal illness that had been the cause of his father's death, and without Mishakal, who left Krynn after the Chaos War, to give clerical powers to Goldmoon to heal him, he travels to the Inn of the Last Home to inform Caramon and Tika about it.

The novel continues explaining that a couple of kender arrive requesting Caramon's help to stop Malystryx, the red dragon overlord, from destroying their home town, Kendermore. Riverwind decides to help them, and is involved in the defense of the city. With the imminent invasion of the dragon and the ogre armies supporting her, Riverwind and Brightdawn travel to Blood Watch, where Malystryx's Peak was situated and her only egg was laid. Brightdawn dies on her way to the lair while fighting the nest's guardian, Yovanna, but Riverwind is able to crack the egg open and slay the embryo within it, forcing Malystryx to go back to the lair and slay him. With Riverwind's sacrifice, the kender were able to flee safely to Hylo, as Malystryx was too depressed to chase them.

== Reception ==
Lauren Davis of io9 commented on how the heroes of the Dragonlance Chronicles feel like a dysfunctional family, describing the Plainsfolk Riverwind and Goldmoon as "so-called "barbarians" in a strange land", and noted that Riverwind "is proud and protective of his wife above all".

In the Io9 series revisiting older Dungeons & Dragons novels, Rob Bricken commented that "A regular barbarian who loves Goldmoon. Goldmoon’s father sent him to find a magical artifact in hopes that Riverwind would die on the journey. Instead, he came back with the Blue Crystal Staff and PTSD. Both he and Goldmoon then left the tribe together to discover the origin of the staff."

== Other media ==
=== Video games ===
Riverwind appears as one of the player characters in Advanced Dungeons & Dragons: Heroes of the Lance.

=== Miniature figures ===
Riverwind was included in Ral Partha's Dragonlance Heroes boxed figures set of lead miniatures. A reviewer for Dragon magazine felt that Ral Partha successfully matched their figures to the descriptions of the characters in the novels, and described his figure: "Riverwind is dressed simply with buckskin and a furred shirt showing a lot of detail, stretching from his shoulders to below his waist. From waist to boots, he is clad in a tight-fitting material that shows hints of the muscles underneath. A simple belt holds a breech cloth, a sheathed sword, and a buckskin-fringed pouch. On his back is a buckskin-fringed quiver full of arrows, with individual shafts and feathers showing. His head and hair are unclad except for a headband. A look of grim determination is on his face as he holds a bow in his right hand. His arm muscles are clearly shown, as are the bow guards."

=== Dragonlance movie ===
Actor Phil LaMarr voices Riverwind and Gilthanas in the animated Dragonlance: Dragons of Autumn Twilight movie, directed by Will Meugniot, written by George Strayton and produced by Toonz Animation, Commotion Pictures, Epic Level Entertainment, Kickstart Entertainment and Paramount Pictures.

== See also ==
- War of the Lance
