= Dragons of Summer Flame =

Book by Margaret Weis and Tracy Hickman

- Cover of the first edition
- Authors: Margaret Weis; Tracy Hickman
- Illustrator: Larry Elmore
- Cover artist: Larry Elmore
- Language: English
- Series: Dragonlance
- Genre: Fantasy literature
- Publisher: TSR, Inc.
- Publication date: November 1995
- Publication place: United States
- Media type: Print (Paperback)
- Pages: 586
- ISBN: 0-7869-0523-9
- OCLC: 35815993

Dragons of Summer Flame is a 1995 fantasy novel by American writers Margaret Weis and Tracy Hickman. The events of the novel follow the fictional Chaos War in the Dragonlance world.

== Publication history ==
Dragons of Summer Flame was first published by TSR in November 1995, with a first printing of 200,000 copies. On November 26, it became a New York Times Bestseller. It was reprinted in February 2002 by Wizards of the Coast.

In April 1996, the book was recorded on four audio cassettes in an abridged version by HighBridge Audio, read by Wanda McCaddon.

== Plot summary ==
After a battle, the Nightlord Steel Brightblade finds Palin Majere, nephew of the famed mage Raistlin. He allows him to return with the bodies of his two brothers, slain in the battle, to their parents, Caramon and Tika.

The Knights of Takhisis visit an island where the hidden race of Irda make their home. The Irda hide themselves with an illusion, pretending to be primitive humans, and the knights leave. This fearful encounter causes the Irda to believe that another invasion will come, and convinces them to break open a magical item known as the Greygem of Gargath. The Irda did not know that the Graygem holds the entity known as Chaos inside it, long thought too dangerous to dabble with, which sets in motion the Chaos War.

Among the Irda is Usha, an orphaned human girl they had raised among them. They believed that while their kind would be immune to the effect of the Greygem, that she, being a human, might be affected by it. So they decided to send her away, giving her a message to deliver to Lord Dalamar, master of the Tower of High Sorcery in Palanthas. After she is gone, they crack open the Greygem and release the god Chaos.

== Reception ==
Maryanne Booth reviewed Dragons of Summer Flame for Arcane magazine, rating it an 8 out of 10 overall. She called the story "well-formed and entertaining, the pace is good and it holds your interest to the end."

A reviewer for Dragon magazine said that the book "...completes the original trilogy on a resounding note."

The many character deaths in the book brought the Dragonlance series to an apparent ending point, which was resolved by taking the world into the Fifth Age, the Age of Mortals. That in combination with TSR's change in the accompanying game rules "ended up splitting Dragonlance fandom", according to Weis.

Margaret Weis does not consider this book to be canon.

== Reviews ==
- Backstab #7
- Magia i Miecz #51 (March 1998) (Polish)

== See also ==
- Dragons of Autumn Twilight
- Dragons of Winter Night
- Dragons of Spring Dawning
