= Laurana Kanan =

Lauralanthalasa Kanan
- Dragonlance character
- Laurana, chained in the foreground with Takhisis in her five-headed dragon form in the background.
- First appearance: Dragons of Autumn Twilight (1984)
- Created by: Margaret Weis and Tracy Hickman

In-universe information
- Aliases: Laurana Kanan; The Golden General
- Race: Qualinesti elf
- Gender: Female
- Class: Fighter
- Home: Qualinost

Laurana Kanan (also known as Lauralanthalasa Kanan), is a fictional character, one of the Heroes of the Lance in the Dragonlance fantasy series, written by Margaret Weis and Tracy Hickman, originally published by TSR, Inc. and later by Wizards of the Coast. One of the most beautiful women on all the world of Krynn, she is a skilled fighter, a brilliant tactician, and an inspirational leader, though she is also headstrong and willful and often allows her heart to rule her head.

== Concept ==
Tracy Hickman's wife, Laura, was the inspiration for Laurana.

== Early life ==
Laurana is the youngest child of the elf king Solostaran, the Speaker of the Sun who rules of the elves of the kingdom called Qualinesti. She has two older brothers: Porthios Kanan, heir to the throne, and Gilthanas Kanan.

Laurana was a rather pampered child, skilled at using her good looks and charm to get what she wanted. This trait follows her into adulthood.

When Laurana was a child (by elf reckoning), she fell in love with Tanis Half-Elven. Much of her story revolves around her love for Tanis, and her many attempts to see him return her feelings. Tanis was the ward of her father, who took care of the boy when his mother died. She was the wife of his brother and Tanis was the product of a violent rape by a human. The two youngsters began a youthful romance which was always frowned upon by the king and Laurana's brothers, who did not think it fit that a royal princess should be so infatuated with a bastard half-breed like Tanis. The romance ended when Tanis made up his mind to leave Qualinesti in the company of Flint Fireforge, the dwarf.

== The War of the Lance ==
The two met again, many years later, when Tanis and his companions sought the elves' aid in freeing the human captives in Pax Tharkas. Raistlin Majere - one of the companions - who was cursed with eyes that saw the eventual decayed state of all things, was surprised that his vision of Laurana was immune to the curse and looked like someone with eternal youth. Laurana sought to rekindle their romance but Tanis broke her heart by telling her he was in love with a human woman named Kitiara Uth Matar and returning the promise ring she had given him years ago. In her anger, she threw the ring away, and it was picked up by Tasslehoff, who was eavesdropping nearby. Laurana refused to give up on the relationship and secretly followed Tanis and the other companions to Pax Tharkas. When Tanis found out Laurana had followed him, he angrily rebuked her for acting like an infatuated child. Laurana resolved to try to prove she was more than that and fought bravely in the subsequent battle at Pax Tharkas.

In the weeks that followed, Laurana worked closely with the human cleric of Paladine, Elistan, to help care for the refugees from Pax Tharkas. Tanis was impressed by the compassion Laurana demonstrated in caring for the refugees and felt jealous of her close friendship with Elistan. The half-elf began to wonder if he had made a mistake in rejecting Laurana.

Before Tanis could resolve these new feelings for Laurana, the two were separated during the sack of Tarsis. Laurana even believed Tanis had been killed when she saw a red dragon destroy the inn where Tanis was staying. Overcome by grief at the apparent death of her love, Laurana did not realize an enemy was stalking her.

The Dragon Highlord Kitiara Uth Matar had learned that Tanis was traveling with Laurana and, overcome with jealousy (especially after being told how incredibly beautiful Laurana was) had followed the Companions to Tarsis. There the masked Kitiara attacked Laurana from behind. Kitiara expected an easy victory over her despised rival, but Laurana fought back ferociously, surprising the Highlord with her resistance. It was only with the help of the sivak draconian, Slith, that Kitiara was finally able to overpower Laurana. Together, Kitiara and Slith dragged the elfwoman off to an alley, where Kitiara intended to kill Laurana after questioning her about the status of her relationship with Tanis. However, before Kitiara could kill Laurana, she was interrupted by Derek Crownguard's group of knights and Elistan. Kitiara was forced to flee, promising Laurana that they would meet again.

Laurana, now the de facto leader of the Companions who fled Tarsis with her, decided that they should travel to Icewall in search of the fabled Dragon Orb. Along the way, she shared in the nightmare of the Speaker of the Stars that all the companions endured, due to a magical elven item carried by Sturm called a Star Jewel, given to him by the Princess of the Silvanesti elves, Alhana Starbreeze. In that nightmare, she saw Tanis with Kitiara, saw Sturm Brightblade killed, and his corpse defiled, and then saw her own death.

Laurana's group continued on their way to Icewall and soon encountered the Icefolk. Laurana devised the plan for the attack on Icewall Castle, the stronghold of Dragon Highlord Feal', Thas, which convinced the Icefolk to help her and her companions. She was then given a magical Frostreaver battle axe by the Icefolk. Laurana participated in the successful attack on Icewall Castle and personally killed Dragon Highlord Feal-Thas with the Frostreaver. The lost Dragon Orb was recovered, as well as a broken dragonlance.

The group was travelling to the island of Sancrist to bring the Dragon Orb to the Knights of Solamnia when their ship was attacked by the white dragon, Sleet. Sleet managed to cripple their ship off the coast of Ergoth, but then Laurana drove off the attacking dragon by shooting it in the wing with her bow. Although she and Gilthanas were on board, she proved to be the better marksman than her brother. The shipwrecked group was then captured by the Silvanesti elves who were now living on Southern Ergoth. Once Laurana informed the Silvanesti that she was the daughter of the Qualinesti Speaker of the Sun, they released her and she was reunited with her family and her people. The reunion did not go well, however; Laurana was shunned by her people. She had lost their respect for running away from home to chase after Tanis and was now seen as being no better than a whore. She also quarreled with her father and older brother, Porthios, about what should be done with the dragon orb. Laurana realized that her people would not use the Dragon Orb in conjunction with the other good nations to defeat the Dragonarmies, so she stole the Dragon Orb out of Qualimori. She was present when the silver dragon Silvara gave Theros Ironfeld the ability to forge the dragonlance in the tomb of Huma Dragonbane.

Laurana traveled with Theros Ironfeld to take the completed dragonlances to the Council of Whitestone on Sancrist. She then was called to testify on Sturm Brightblade's behalf at a Knight's Council. Her impassioned speech convinced the Knights of Solamnia to grant Sturm his full knighthood and so impressed the leading knight, Lord Gunthar Uth Wistan, that he asked Laurana to travel to the High Clerist's Tower to teach the knights there how to use the dragonlance. Laurana reluctantly agreed to do this.

Laurana reached the High Clerist's Tower only to find the knights there badly divided. The news that Sturm had been vindicated caused the knight Derek Crownguard to lead his faction of knights in a hopeless attack against the besieging Dragonarmy forces. After Derek's knights had been wiped out, the Blue Dragonarmy officer Bakaris, brought the dead body of Lord Alfred Markenin and the dying Derek up to the tower to taunt the remaining knights. Laurana quickly silenced Bakaris by shooting him in the arm, permanently crippling him.

The Blue Dragonarmy attacked the High Clerist's Tower the next day. Laurana participated in the battle, impressing Sturm with her courage and skill with a bow. The Knights repulsed the Dragonarmy attack but it was clear the tower would fall as soon as the Dragonarmy attacked with its dragons. It was then that Tasslehoff Burrfoot revealed he had found another Dragon Orb inside the tower and Laurana devised a plan to use the orb to create a trap. She successfully used the power of the Orb to summon the dragons so that they could be easily dispatched by dragonlances in the tunnels under the tower, but the price for this victory was high. To buy Laurana enough time to execute her plan, Sturm Brightblade sacrificed his own life, an act that left a mark on Laurana's soul.

Even though Laurana was greatly weakened by her use of the orb, she immediately rushed to the tower wall to try to prevent Sturm's body from being mutilated as she had foreseen in the Dream. There Laurana was again confronted by the Dragon Highlord Kitiara Uth Matar who disarmed Laurana but did not otherwise physically attack her. The two women recognized each other and exchanged words, with Kitiara taunting Laurana about how Tanis was now sharing the Highlord's bed in the city of Flotsam. Laurana did not want to believe Kitiara but in her heart she knew the Highlord was telling her the truth. Badly shaken by this revelation about Tanis, Laurana allowed Kitiara to leave the tower in peace.

After the victory at the High Clerist's Tower, Laurana became a hero to the people of Solamnia. She traveled to the city of Palanthas to try to convince the Palanthians to join the fight against the Dragonarmies. While meeting with the Lord of Palanthas, Amothus, Laurana received a message from Lord Gunthar, now the Grand Master of the Knights of Solamnia, appointing her as the commander of the knights guarding Palanthas, more as a political move than anything else. The Palanthians then agreed to enter the war and gave Laurana command of their army as well. Laurana was also reunited with her brother Gilthanas, who gave her further proof that Tanis was with Kitiara. Convinced she had lost Tanis to Kitiara, a heartbroken Laurana could do nothing but throw herself fully into her new command role.

The appointment of Laurana as a General soon proved to be an inspired choice as she led her army, now aided by good dragons, onto the offensive, defeating the Dragonarmies in a series of battles known as the Vingaard Campaign and freeing the city of Kalaman. Laurana's innovative tactics were instrumental in winning these battles, and the grateful people of Solamnia nicknamed her the "Golden General" for her golden hair and radiant nature. The Solamnics believed she was their good luck charm. The luck would not last.

Kitiara, who dismissed Laurana's many victories over her as a "fluke" was already planning a counterstrike. She believed that if she captured the Golden General it would destroy the morale of the good armies and make it easy to reconquer all the land she had lost in the Vingaard Campaign. To set this clever plan into motion Kitiara used Laurana's weakness: Tanis.

Kitiara believed Laurana would put her feelings for Tanis above the well-being of her people, so she set her trap for Laurana by sending the elfwoman a false message claiming that Tanis was dying and wanted to see her which Kitiara would only allow in exchange for Laurana releasing Bakaris (who had been captured during the Vingaard Campaign). Flint Fireforge and Tasslehoff Burrfoot both tried to convince Laurana that Kitiara was lying and the message was a trap, but Laurana, who was already convinced that Tanis was with Kitiara, believed the message and thinking (based on her prior encounter with Kitiara at the High Clerist's Tower where Kitiara had behaved as an honorable enemy and had not tried to harm Laurana even after catching her in an extremely vulnerable position) that she understood Kitiara and could trust her to honor a truce, decided to make the exchange. Flint and Tasslehoff then insisted on accompanying Laurana to the exchange to which she agreed.

Laurana, accompanied by a reluctant Flint and Tasslehoff, took Bakaris to the exchange site where she found not Tanis but the draconian Gakhan and two wyvern. Gakhan then informed Laurana that Tanis's condition had worsened and if she wanted to see him she would have to travel to Dargaard Keep. Laurana refused to do this but was then told that if she did not surrender the wyvern would kill her friends. Finally realizing she had fallen into a trap but fearing for her friend's lives if she resisted, Laurana surrendered herself. She was transported by wyvern to just outside Dargaard Keep, where Bakaris then attempted to rape her. Laurana fought back but was overpowered and dragged by Bakaris into a cave. However, before he could force himself on the elfwoman, Tasslehoff came to her defense, stabbing Bakaris. Laurana then attacked Bakaris in a frenzy and succeeded in killing him. But then before Laurana and her friends could leave the area, they were attacked by the death knight Lord Soth, one of Kitiara's most powerful allies. Lord Soth's fear aura overwhelmed Laurana and her friends, leaving them powerless to resist him, and his chill touch caused Laurana to lose consciousness. Lord Soth then carried Laurana off to Dargaard Keep. A triumphant Kitiara then traveled to the city of Kalaman, where she announced that Laurana was now her prisoner and would be executed in three weeks time unless the good armies surrendered and Berem the Everman was turned over to her.

Tanis, arriving in Kalaman, learned of what had happened and, feeling responsible for Laurana's predicament, set out with the reunited Companions to free Laurana from her prison in Neraka. Upon arriving in Neraka, he made a deal with Kitiara that he would serve in her army if she released Laurana. Kitiara promised to consider this offer but was lying to Tanis as she had already promised Laurana's soul to Lord Soth.

At the Council of Highlords that night in the Temple of Takhisis, the evil goddess Takhisis called for the captured Laurana to be put on display before the assembled Dragonarmies. Lord Soth then carried in a body that had been wrapped from head to toe in winding cloth and placed the cocooned figure at Kitiara's feet, and Kitiara cut open the wrappings to reveal a nearly suffocated Laurana. The captive elfwoman staggered to her feet and was initially defiant. Kitiara then pointed out Tanis, apparently willingly serving her, to Laurana. Laurana was initially hopeful upon seeing Tanis, but to mask his true intentions from Takhisis, Tanis treated Laurana very coldly, disheartening her. Kitiara then roughly handled Laurana and offered the elfwoman as her gift to Takhisis who proclaimed that Laurana was to be tortured to death. Kitiara then asked Takhisis that Tanis be allowed to join the Dragonarmies, and Tanis, who was ordered to stand before Takhisis, prostrated himself before the evil goddess. Kitiara then also asked Takhisis to grant Laurana's soul to Lord Soth. Laurana was devastated at seeing Tanis worshipping Takhisis and terrified at the prospect of being enslaved for all eternity to the death knight.

Kitiara then told Tanis to fulfill his promise and present his sword to the Emperor Ariakas as a sign of fidelity to the Dragonarmies. Tanis was furious about Kitiara offering Laurana's soul to Lord Soth but knew he must continue to play along if he wanted to save Laurana. As Tanis approached Ariakas, he realized what he must do and then, pretending to lay his sword at the Emperor's feet, stabbed Ariakas. Tanis then grabbed the Crown of Power, intending to ransom the Crown for Laurana's life.

Kitiara agreed to exchange Laurana for the Crown and allowed Tanis to release the elfwoman, but Laurana was unaware that Tanis was trying to save her, and so she broke free on her own. Laurana attacked Kitiara, stealing the Highlord's sword and knocking her to the ground. Tanis then tried to stop Laurana from running off, but after seeing him seemingly serving Kitiara and worshipping Takhisis, Laurana no longer trusted Tanis, and so she shoved him off the platform. This caused the half-elf to drop the Crown and all of the Dragonarmy factions to start fighting each other over its ownership. Laurana fought her way out of the Council chambers in the confusion with Tanis chasing after her.

Tanis finally caught up to Laurana but then Kitiara caught up with them as well and offered Tanis the chance to rule at her side. She also warned Tanis that Lord Soth was coming to collect Laurana. Tanis rejected Kitiara's offer, telling her that he would die to protect Laurana. This convinced Laurana that Tanis was not evil and that he did love her. Kitiara then surprisingly allowed Tanis and Laurana to escape. As they were flying the temple they came across Tasslehoff's belongings scattered around and discovered the promise ring amongst the trinkets and saw it as a sign of their rebounding after going through thick and thin. The two then escaped the temple and were reunited with their friends.

The battle which was taking place in Neraka led to the downfall of Takhisis and the end of the War of the Lance. Laurana and Tanis were married following the end of the war and moved to the city of Solanthus.

== After the war ==
Although Laurana was a pivotal character in the Chronicles trilogy, she faded into the background following the end of that series, only being occasionally mentioned until the War of Souls.

During that time, Laurana and Tanis had a son named Gilthas, a sickly and weak child who was doted upon by his overprotective mother. Laurana also worked alongside Tanis as a diplomat between the Elven nations and the Knights of Solamnia. She continued to be extremely popular amongst the Solamnic people, who remembered her as the Golden General who had saved them and she worked tirelessly to try to bring the elven and human nations together.

When a rebellion drove the rightful king of the Qualinesti elves, Porthios, from power, the senators behind the coup needed a new puppet king whom they could manipulate to run the kingdom as they saw fit. Gilthas had a royal connection to the rulership of Qualinesti, so they chose him, also believing that his human blood would make him weak and easily controlled. Eventually, Laurana and Tanis agreed. Although Laurana would be allowed to visit, and still held great popular sway as the Queen Mother, Tanis was forbidden to see his son ever again. Not long after, he was killed during the Chaos War.

Laurana remained in Qualinost following Tanis's death to aid her son in gaining real power in the kingdom. She was there when the great green dragon, Beryllinthranox (Beryl) conquered the forest and made the people her subjects. She was even present for the secret wedding of her son to the Kagonesti elf, Kerianseray, with whom he had fallen in love.

During the War of Souls, Laurana at last returned to some prominence in the series. While living in Qualinost, she helped the people to survive under the oppressive yoke of their Dragon Overlord. She was loved, secretly, by Marshal Alexius Medan, the leader of the Knights of Neraka who were stationed there, but Laurana, although she respected the Marshall, first as an honorable enemy and eventually as a friend, remained true to the memory of Tanis. Medan was assassinated by an Elven servant of Laurana's (to avenge the death of the servant's brother) immediately prior to the ultimate battle with the dragon Beryl who had decided to destroy the Qualinesti. During the final battle against Beryl, Laurana defeated the monstrous dragon, but at the expense of her own life. She did manage to buy enough time for the Qualinesti elves to escape the city via tunnels and, in doing so, paid back the debt that she owed to the fallen Sturm Brightblade.

Brand	Elansa Sungold	Kethrenan	Solostaran	?
Tanis Half-Elven	Laurana	Gilthanas	Porthios	Alhana Starbreeze
Gilthas Pathfinder	Kerianseray	Silvanoshei
Balifaris

== Character controversy ==
The character of Laurana caused the first real argument between authors Margaret Weis and Tracy Hickman when writing the Chronicles. Weis maintained that Laurana would not abandon her responsibilities as the Golden General to go save her fickle lover while Hickman believed Laurana would choose love over duty. As the plot required Laurana to be captured to set up the end of the story, Weis finally gave in.

== Reception ==
Lauren Davis of io9 called Laurana a "spoiled elven princess", but commented on the "wonderful female characters" in the series, singling out what she considered two of the strongest: "Kitiara Uth Matar and the princess Laurana, are rivals for the heart of Tanis Half-Elven, but their status as romantic rivals isn't what makes them compelling characters. I'll admit that reading the books as a pre-teen, I admired Kitiara, who was sexy and manipulative (and attracted some of the most powerful male characters in the books), but also respected as a military leader and seen as a peer by a mighty dragon. Laurana, however, gets the more significant arc, after starting out as a lovelorn girl with a romantic view of the world. As she is thrust into war-torn Ansalon, however, Laurana proves herself a competent fighter and military leader in her own right, one who watches friends die, who sees herself shunned by her family, but who marches on tirelessly to protect Krynn from the forces of Takhisis. As seductive as Kitiara is, as a young girl I was inspired watching the growth of Laurana."

In the Io9 series revisiting older Dungeons & Dragons novels, Rob Bricken called her "The character best served by Winter Night [...] unequivocally" noting that in her first appearances she was "a completely naïve, lovestruck elf princess chasing after Tanis" who "becomes the leader of her half of the party, kicking ass, taking names, giving genuinely rousing battle speeches, and not fainting dead away when Tanis' ex-girlfriend Kitiara shows up as a Dragon Highlord and taunts her that Tanis has joined the bad guys. It's all very satisfying."

Bricken later described his "least favorite moment in Spring Dawning—and maybe in the entire trilogy" noting that Kitiara sends a message to Laurana "who has been kicking the draconian asses of Takhisis' forces all across Krynn. She's a tactical genius, all the disparate groups under her control believe in her fully, and she's known as the 'Golden General' to her troops and the townsfolk [...] All Laurana needs to do is bring an evil commander she'd captured for a hostage exchange and to come alone. Laurana offers no proof that she has Tanis, and Tas and Flint explain repeatedly that they know Kitiara and she's definitely lying—but ignoring the war, the pivotal role she plays in it, the troops that need her in command, and the people she's supposed to protect, Laurana goes anyway, like she's the moon-eyed girl from Autumn Twilight. She's captured instantly, of course." Bricken was critical of Weis and Hickman for their depiction of this moment, suggesting they "knew they wanted Laurana at the Temple of Takhisis for the final act but were given 10 minutes to brainstorm on a narratively satisfying way they could make it happen, and this is the best they could come up with. Oh, also, Kitiara tells all the combined forces of good they have three weeks to unequivocally surrender and let the literal embodiment of evil rule over Krynn or Laurana will be killed. Admittedly, Laurana was extremely good at her job, but why would they choose eternal darkness and subjugation over a single person?"
