= List of Dragonlance characters =

This is a list of characters in the Dragonlance series of fantasy novels and related fantasy role-playing game materials. It includes accounts of their early lives in the series.

== Characters ==
=== Alhana Starbreeze ===
Alhana Starbreeze, Silvanesti Elf, is first introduced in Dragons of Winter Night as the daughter of Speaker of the Stars Lorac Caladon. During the War of the Lance, Alhana leads her people in exile to Ergoth. She later brings the Heroes of the Lance to Silvanesti where they encounter the nightmare and fight the dragon Cyan Bloodbane. Alhana fell in love with Sturm Brightblade and even gave him a starjewel, but their love could never be, and he died soon afterwards. She later marries Porthios Kanan and works with him to eradicate the dream from Silvanesti. Although their marriage is chilly and mainly political, they eventually grow to love each other. During the Chaos War, she gives birth to a son, Silvanoshei. Years later during the War of Souls, Silvanoshei would fall in love with Mina and follows her to Sanction. There, he kills Takhisis and Mina kills him in turn. Alhana names her nephew Gilthas leader of the elven people and departs.

In the Elven Exiles Trilogy, it is revealed that Alhana has gone searching for Porthios, and she eventually finds him in Bianost. She joins his fight to free Qualinesti, comes with him to Khur to save the elves there, and then returns with him to Qualinesti to continue the struggle to free Qualinesti.

=== Alleran Waylan ===
Alleran Waylan, human, also known as Wonderful Waylan, is the biological father of Tika Waylan. He had Tika with one of the barmaids at the Inn of the Last Home. Alleran was a minor mage who often entertained crowds, stealing from them in the process. He was, however, rather charming, a good distraction when he was pilfering his customers money. Alleran started off as a trickster skilled at sleight of hand and picked up some small magic from a wandering mage. Alleran eventually abandoned Tika and Otik became her adopted father.

=== Angriff Brightblade ===
Angriff Brightblade, human, is the father of Sturm Brightblade. Angriff was a Knight of the Sword, in his time considered to be one of the three best swordsmen in the order of Solamnic knights. He was betrayed during the Siege of Castle Brightblade by Boniface Crownguard, and disappeared shortly thereafter, having traded himself for the life of his men.

=== Ariakan Ariakas ===
Ariakan Ariakas, human, is the son of Duulket Ariakas and an aspect of the sea goddess Zeboim. He is the founder of the Knights of Takhisis (now the Knights of Neraka), formed from his study of the Knights of Solamnia. His Knights nearly conquered all of Ansalon, but the armies of Chaos interrupt him, and he is slain in battle. However, it is later revealed that his soul is in fact trapped in a game piece, and he is released from it. Zeboim restores him to life, and his current status is unknown.

=== Astinus of Palanthas ===
Astinus of Palanthas, human, also known as Astinus Lorekeeper, is the head librarian of the Library of Palanthas. When Astinus hears of Raistlin, he orders his disciples to put him in a cell so that Astinus may see him "if he has time". When Astinus confronts Raistlin, he recognizes the essence of Fistandantilus and therefore refers to Raistlin as "Old Friend". Fistandantilus created the Sphere of Time for Astinus to view the land and record everything as it is happening—truly, he "sees all as it is happening". Astinus records all history as it happens until the Chaos War, when he disappears. Astinus is believed by some to be either an aspect of Gilean, god of the Book, or a son of his. A legend states that Astinus is being trained by Gilean to go back to the beginning of time and become Gilean, thus entering a time loop.

=== Berem Everman ===
Berem Everman, human, also known as The Green Gemstone Man. The Foundation Stone of the Kingpriest's Temple of Istar was discovered in the Abyss by Takhisis, Queen of Darkness. Takhisis knew she could create a gateway back to the mortal world of Krynn via this, and forced the Foundation Stone out of the Abyss onto the plains of Neraka, where it began to grow a twisted, evil version of the Kingpriest's temple. This twisted temple was found by Jasla and her brother Berem, who decided to take one of the large emeralds decorating the central pillar. Berem is overcome by the force of evil emanating from the stones, though Jasla begs him to stop. Berem refuses, claiming the brilliant gem will more than pay for their needs for years to come. In his agitated state, Berem rushes Jasla and pushes her away, accidentally killing his sister when she gashes her head open upon the jagged rocks of the Foundation. The emerald fuses into Berem's chest, granting him a form of immortality (he can die, but is always reborn, not remembering how he came back). Without the emerald, the Foundation Stone is useless, and Takhisis is prevented from entering Krynn. She commands her forces to search for Berem, who is known to them as the Everman due to his immortality. After being stopped by Raistlin in the basement of the Dark Queen's Temple, Raistlin tells his brother "this happens because I want it to happen!" Raistlin releases The Everman from his immortality, and Berem impales himself on the jeweled column and spills his blood over it. His spirit then rejoins his sister, who had been holding the Dark Queen at bay, and the door to Krynn slams shut.

=== Bupu Bulp ===
As a gully dwarf, little Bupu Bulp is never taken seriously except by Raistlin Majere. Raistlin casts a spell of friendship on Bupu, but soon Raistlin unexpectedly starts to really consider the little dwarf a friend. Bupu is one of very few people that Raistlin actually considered a friend. Bupu stole the spellbook of Fistandantilus from Khisanth, and later gave it to Raistlin as gift of farewell. In addition to being included in the original Dragonlance series, Bupu appears in the Legends series, and is often considered the only true symbol of a possibility of a "caring" side to Raistlin. She appears to be intertwined with the deepest parts of Raistlin's soul; in a last-ditch effort to save himself from a Dragon Orb, Raistlin dredges up his last reserves of power, in the form of an image of Bupu.

=== Caramon Majere ===
Caramon Majere (Younger), human, was the first born son of a woodcutter and the twin of Raistlin Majere, with a complicated childhood. Caramon was strapping and healthy, while Raistlin was so sickly that the midwife feared he would die as an infant. Raistlin had to be nursed to health continuously by their half-sister, Kitiara. From an early age, Caramon's deliberate way of considering ideas earned him a reputation for mental dullness. Raistlin harbors a secret hate for his twin's physical power and easygoing manner, and for the attention and comradeship it seems to earn him, as Raistlin's own appearance and secretive nature causes others to be mistrustful and apprehensive. Caramon, conversely, holds Raistlin in high regard and tries to protect him.

Caramon was also a participant in the final battle at the Queen's temple in Neraka when she was finally banished from Krynn. After the battle was won, Caramon was confronted by his brother Raistlin, who had now turned to the Black Robes. Caramon offered to walk the path of evil with his brother, but Raistlin refused, and left Caramon alone for the first time in his life. Despite this, Caramon remains loyal to his brother, with a willingness to provide aid at any time.

Caramon is an attractive and physically strong man. Having worked on farms since his youth, he favors physical activities. After training with Sturm Brightblade under Flint Fireforge's tutelage, he joined a mercenary army and began traveling with his brother. He was pulled into the past with Raistlin and Tasslehoff Burrfoot. Caramon then controls a mercenary army of Solamnic knights, thieves and hill dwarfs. He waged a short war on the mountain dwarves of Thorbardin so Raistlin could get to the portal to the Abyss. After time traveling, he married Tika Waylan, and together they had three sons (Tanin, Sturm, Palin) and two daughters (Laura and Dezra). After, he went to the future (present), and journeyed to stop the god Raistlin, with Tas and Tanis. Caramon died shortly after the Great Storm marking the beginning of the War of Souls. Caramon and Raistlin's relationship was explored in the NY Times Best Seller Twins Trilogy.

Rino Romano voiced Caramon Majere in the animated film Dragonlance: Dragons of Autumn Twilight. The 2002 winner of the American Library Association's Alex Award Mel Odom reviewed the film and stated "Caramon is simple-minded and protective of Raistlin" without further characterisation although stating the film was a "lot of fun." The final book of the trilogy Test of the Twins appeared on the NY Times Bestseller List for several weeks in 1986. Ian Hewitt, a staff reviewer from d20zines.com stated focus of the trilogy was Caramon's heart-wrenching quest to save his brother if he can, but to ultimately stop him at any cost is the test that the twins must face and awarded Test of the Twins an A+ rating. In Religious Concepts in Fantasy Literature, Nadine Wolf wrote that while Caramon is the physically stronger twin compared to Raistlin, it is the latter who "dominates their relationship". This is equivalent to what studies of real life twins has shown happens. Caramon appears as one of the player characters in Advanced Dungeons & Dragons: Heroes of the Lance.

=== Crysania Tarinius ===
Crysania Tarinius, human, is a cleric of the newly formed church of Paladine. After the events of the Dragons of Spring Dawning, she is convinced that she can turn Raistlin from evil but falls in love with him instead. Raistlin uses her to enter the domain of the evil goddess Takhisis in order to kill the goddess. Crysania survives, but is blinded. After which, she is made head of the church of Paladine, and is then known as the Revered Daughter of Paladine in the Dragonlance mythos.

She finds love during the Chaos War in the person of a White-Robed mage named Valin who serves for a time as a guide of sort for the blind priestess. Valin initially declares his love for Crysania, only to be turned away because of Crysania's dedication to the people of Krynn as the leader of the church of Paladine. During the Chaos War, Crysania loses contact with Paladine, and every cleric besides Crysania loses their ability to heal. Being the leader of the church of Paladine, Crysania seeks ways to communicate with the gods once again to revive the faith and hope of the citizens of Krynn. The Dark Elf Dalamar presents Crysania with the description of five stones known as the Dragon Stones which have the power to communicate directly with the gods. Dalamar turns Valin into the white tiger known as Tandar to serve as a guide for Crysania while she searches for the remaining Dragon Stones. And in order for Valin to once again become human, Crysania needs to declare her love for him. In return, Dalamar requires Valin to report to him regarding their progress while they search for the Dragon Stones. As a tiger, Valin is able to provide Crysania the power to see from his perspective and has the ability to communicate with her telepathically. Along with three other travelers, Crysania and Valin travel to Neraka to find the three missing Dragon Stones. After finding the stones, the pair journey to Goldshome where Crysania is able to communicate with Paladine. Paladine informs Crysania that the gods will be leaving Krynn and that it will be the age for mortals to live on their own. Crysania eventually discovers that Tandar is in fact Valin. Upon discovering that the gods will be leaving, Crysania finally declares that she loves Valin, thus breaking the geas of Dalamar's spell. Crysania and Valin travel back to Palanathus to face the trials of the Age of Mortals together.

Following that war and the apparent departure of Paladine, Crysania goes on to become a mystic of Goldmoon's Citadel of the Heart; she counsels Lord Liam, Grand Master of the Solamnic Knights to rebuild the order of the Clerist around mysticism. She is supposed to have survived the War of Souls, but is no longer in control of the (now defunct) church of Paladine.

=== Dalamar Argent ===
Dalamar Argent, also known as Dalamar the Dark, Dalamar of Tarsis and Dalamar Nightson, is a Silvanesti elf, though he has now been made a dark elf and thus exiled for using evil magic. Dalamar is a Wizard of the Black Robes, calling upon the black moon Nuitari for his power. Dalamar was apprenticed to the great wizard Raistlin Majere, and he was, for a short time, Highmage of the Conclave, the society that rules the magical world. He was once killed, but is now resurrected and still serving the Black Robes and the entire magical world. Despite the fact that black robes indicate evilness in the Dragonlance universe, Dalamar has helped out noble characters in the cause of good upon multiple occasions.

=== Dhamon Grimwulf ===
Dhamon Evran Grimwulf, human/shadow dragon, also known as Damon-dragon, was a Knight of Takhisis before he saw the vision of Goldmoon at the Tomb of the Last Heroes. Dhamon becomes the leader of the Heroes of the Heart until he nearly kills Goldmoon on Malystryx's orders, because he has one of her scales embedded in his leg. Luckily, a silver and a shadow dragon helps free him by breaking the spell on the scale, and twisting it to the shadow dragon's own ends. Soon after the transformation, the scale started to pain him harshly and frequently. Thus plagued by the scale he proceeds to engage in thievery and other such activities to pay for the magical sword of Tanis Half-Elven. His mission in life is that of personal gain and to relieve himself of the scale on his leg, rapidly spreading, enforced by the magic of the Shadow Dragon whose blood was used to undo the control that Malystryx had over Dhamon. Through deception Dhamon is tricked into working for the Shadow Dragon to destroy the Black overlord, Sable. However, Dhamon decides to try to kill the shadow dragon with the help of a wingless Sivak Draconian, Ragh, the mad Solamnic Knight, Fiona and the Ogre mage Maldred. Dhamon struggles with his conscience to undermine the Shadow Dragon and become once again a free soul. He tries to save his family while hunting for the shadow dragon, and by this time looks like a shadow spawn. Later, when a dragon attempts to use Dhamon to help the shadow dragon rebirth, the process goes awry and Dhamon becomes a shadow dragon. Years later, he yearns for manhood again, and attempts to do so. However, he was stopped by Sable, and although he managed to kill her, he too perished in the process.

=== Ariakas Duulket ===
Ariakas Duulket, human, is a warrior and evil magic user who leads the Dragonarmies of Ansalon during the War of the Lance. A physically huge and imposing man, he commanded respect and ruled through fear. He is the father of Ariakan, founder of the Knights of Takhisis. He is the leader of all the individual divisions of the Dragonarmies (each led by a Highlord), and proclaims himself Emperor of Ansalon (and wears the Crown of Power). His attacks help to conquer a good deal of Ansalon. At a meeting of all the Highlords, Tanis Half-Elven, aided by Raistlin Majere, kills Ariakas. His heir, Ariakan, was the product of a romance between Ariakas and the goddess Zeboim.

=== Elistan ===
Elistan was a Seeker and on his deathbed when he was sent to the mines of Pax Tharkas under the Dragon Highlord Verminaard. He converts to the faith of Paladine after Goldmoon shows him the Disks of Mishakal and healed him completely as the first cleric of Mishakal. He is freed by the Heroes of the Lance and leads the refugees from the mines, and later builds the Temple of Paladine in Palanthas. He dies after discussing matters concerning Raistlin Majere with Tanis Half-Elven and Dalamar and named Crysania as his successor, and Paladine (in the guise of Fizban) claims the body.

=== Fistandantilus ===
Fistandantilus was a black-robed Wizard of High Sorcery during the years immediately preceding the Cataclysm of Krynn. He is present in the city of Istar during the Age of Might in the court of the Kingpriest. He uses an artifact called the Bloodstone to retain his immortality. Fistandantilus makes an attempt at godhood aided by the cleric Denubis; however, at the gate where he would pass into the Abyss and make his attempt, a nearby time traveling field disrupts his spell and kills him. His spirit eventually finds Raistlin Majere and gives the young wizard his power in exchange for residence in his body. Eventually, Raistlin travels to the past and absorbs Fistandantilus into himself.

=== Fizban ===
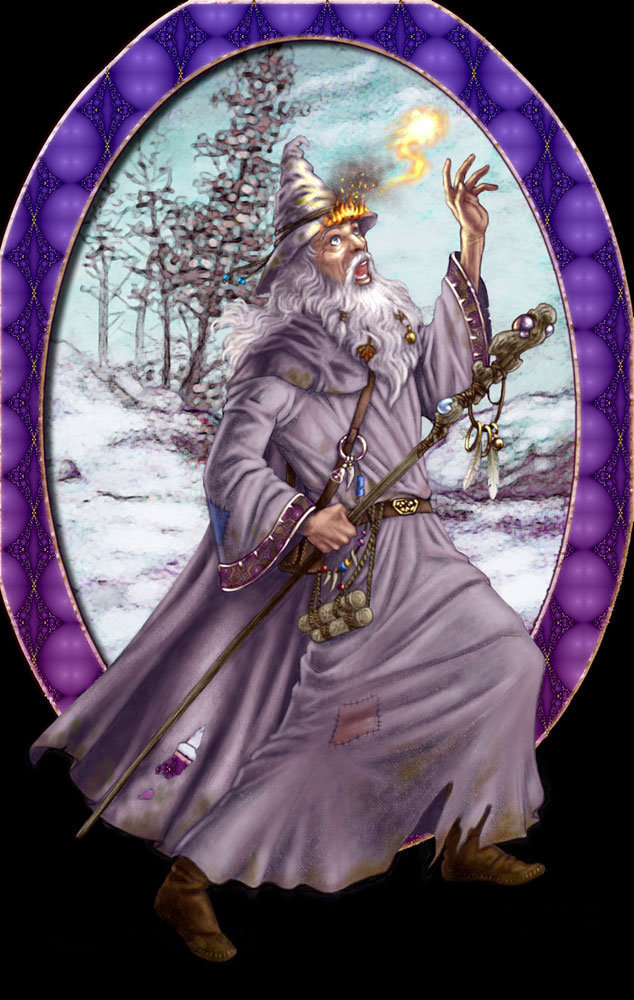
Fizban

Fizban "The Fabulous" is a wizard. He is secretly the mortal avatar of the god Paladine. Though he is wise and powerful he disguises his true purpose in the form of a clumsy and absent-minded wizard.

During the Chronicles Trilogy Paladine helped the Heroes of the Lance indirectly through Fizban. The kender Tasslehoff Burrfoot, one of the heroes, also became a close friend of Fizban.

Weis and Hickman later created a similar character in the Death gate cycle named Zifnab, although they jokingly assure that he is completely different from the Fizban character that TSR owns the copyrights to.

=== Flint Fireforge ===
Flint is a Neidar (hill dwarf) who exiled himself from his village due to familial conflicts. Spending his life in Solace with eventual travels to Qualinesti to sell his craftsmanship, where he met and befriended Tanis Half-Elven. He met and befriended Tasslehoff Burrfoot when the latter tried to steal one of his trinkets. He is the oldest of the Heroes of the Lance. He dies in the third book of the Chronicles of a heart attack whilst travelling through the range of mountains called Godshome. Paladine, in the guise of Fizban, takes him to Reorx's forge, where he waits for Tasslehoff's passing.

Flint the King author Mary Kirchoff said she imagined Flint's voice as a combination of Wilford Brimley and Yosemite Sam, and referred to Tasslehoff Burrfoot and Flint as "the Abbott and Costello of Dragonlance". Flint appears as one of the player characters in the video game Advanced Dungeons & Dragons: Heroes of the Lance.

Flint is voiced by Fred Tatasciore in the animated film Dragonlance: Dragons of Autumn Twilight.

=== Gerard Uth Mondar ===
A Knight of Solamnia who was stationed as a guard at the Tomb of the Last Heroes at the start of The War of Souls. He is often described as having an unattractive face, a fact which is eventually overshadowed by his confident demeanor. He aided Laurana and the Qualinesti in their plight against Beryl. He eventually quits the Knighthood for their failure to assist the now exiled Qualinesti elves and becomes the sheriff of Solace.

=== Gilon Majere ===
Gilon Majere is the father of Caramon Majere and Raistlin Majere. He was a woodcutter that was married to Rosamun Aelan Uth Matar.

=== Gilthanas ===
Gilthanas is the brother of Porthios and Laurana. He plays a bigger role in the Dragonlance series during Dragons of Autumn Twilight through to Dragons of the Winter Night. During these books he shows a hatred and distrust towards Tanis. He does this because he knows the half elf is a bastard, but has captured the attention of his sister, Laurana, who holds the high station of being daughter of the speaker of the Suns. He aided in Tanis's decision to leave the elves and search for his own way. Gilthanas moves on to meet the beautiful Silvara, a silver dragon in Wild Elf form. Then he disappears with her, while in her elven form and falls in love with her. Gilthanas and the dragon bring the silver dragons into the war of the lance, but in the end he disappears. He reappears, saved by the Heroes of the Heart and joins them in Jean Rabe's Age of Mortals' trilogy, where he reveals being a prisoner for the better part of the period after the War of the Lance.

Gilthanas is voiced by Phil LaMarr in the animated feature Dragonlance: Dragons of Autumn Twilight.

=== Gilthas ===
Gilthas is Tanis Half-Elven's and Laurana Kanan's son. Gilthas is the leader of the combined elven people, known as the Speaker of the Sun and Stars. He was once sickly and frail, but is now much stronger in his role as ruler of the elves. He is made the puppet ruler of Qualinesti by the Senate (after his uncle Porthios is cast out), but eventually works with a rebel group led by his wife Kerianseray, the Lioness, and takes much more control over the land. He commissions the dwarves to dig tunnels under Qualinost as an escape route; when the great dragon Beryl dies and falls in upon the city, the weakened bottom collapses and the city is turned into a lake. Gilthas, as of the Elven Exiles trilogy, is leading his people in the lands of Khur.

=== Goldmoon ===
A barbarian princess, daughter of the chieftain of the Que Shu. She arrived to Solace carrying a blue crystal staff with strange powers, and seeking clerics who could explain the lost gods to her. She has a romantic interest in Riverwind, a warrior in her tribe, and he loves her as well. They travel together. She becomes the prophet of the goddess Mishakal. After the Chaos War and the loss of one of her daughters and her husband, she finds the strength to form the Citadel of Light, a beacon for hope, where she forms other to the mysteries of the power of the Heart. After the Great Storm that marks the beginning of the War of Souls, she journeys throughout Ansalon to the Tower of Nightlund where she confronts her former protégée Mina, now a cleric of Takhisis, the One God. Her dying prayer, sent through the portal of the tower, reaches Paladine who uses her pleas to find the planet Krynn. Lucy Lawless voiced Goldmoon in the animated film Dragonlance: Dragons of Autumn Twilight.

=== Huma Dragonbane ===
Huma Dragonbane is a Knight of Solamnia known for defeating Takhisis and forcing her out of the world along with finding the dragonlances and supplying his forces with them, bringing much needed power to his allies. Among his companions are Kaz, a minotaur, and Magius, a mage. Huma belongs to the Order of the Crown. He unknowingly falls in love with a silver dragon named Gwyneth. Although he immediately feels a sense of dubiousness due to their racial differences, in the end, he admits his love of her. He defeats Takhisis and forces her to swear that she will not reenter the world again, although she tries to numerous times afterwards. Huma then died from his wounds. He is the Paragon of Virtue on the Protector's Path to Godshome. The novel Legend of Huma by Richard A. Knaak is the epic that tells his tale in full.

=== Kaz the Minotaur ===
Kaz is a minotaur who originally fights for Takhisis, but rebels against his ogre superiors and leaves the Dark Queen's army. After deserting the Dark Queen, Kaz is captured by a band of goblins and is freed by Huma Dragonbane. He swears to repay Huma and becomes a valuable ally to the Knights of Solamnia, giving them details of the Dark Queen's armies and their tactics. Kaz becomes a loyal friend to Huma, risking his own life for Huma's more than once. After Huma's death fighting Takhisis, Kaz eventually returns to his homeland. Followers of Kaz and of Kiri-Jolith form a secret society founded on Kaz's values and the great sense of honor and loyalty Kaz learned from Huma.

=== Kingpriest of Istar ===
The Kingpriest of Istar is a title held by the leader of Istar, which is effectively a theocracy. The last Kingpriest, Beldinas Pilofiro, eventually outlaws the worship of all evil and neutral gods and attacked the worship of most of the gods of good. Arrogantly he demanded to be given the power to control humanity, one of those acts responsible for causing the Cataclysm, when the Fiery Mountain foretold by a former friend of Pilofiro comes crashing down on Krynn, destroying the Holy Empire of Istar on the Continent of Ansalon.

=== Kith-Kanan ===
Kith-Kanan is the first Speaker of the Sun, leader and founder of the elven nation of Qualinesti. His father is the Speaker of the Stars Sithel, and he has a twin brother, Sithas. He eventually runs away from Silvanesti and joins an elf in the wild. She becomes pregnant with child, but she is killed and the child will later come forth from the tree that she turns into. Kith-Kanan later builds a city by name of Sithelbec; when his father comes to visit at his behest, Sithel is killed by Ergoth assassins. He leads the elves against the nation of Ergoth, and when he wins, the Swordsheath Scroll is signed and grants Kith-Kanan the land to build the nation of Qualinesti. Kith-Kanan builds the new elven nation there, and eventually, the tree that contains his firstborn son Silveran breaks and reveals the child. Through the magic of another one of Kith-Kanan's sons Ulvian, Silveran mortally wounds his father. Kith-Kanan forgives Ulvian and names Silveran his heir. He is laid to rest in the tunnel called the Sla-Mori, which leads from the elven lands to the fortress Pax Tharkas. He bestowed his magic sword Wurmsbane to Tanis when he chanced upon his tomb during Dragons of Autumn Twilight.

=== Kitiara Uth Matar ===
Half-sister of Caramon and Raistlin Majere, Kitiara became a mercenary at a very early age. She was Tanis's lover for a time, but they separated when the group they traveled with each decided to seek personal goals for a time. They were to meet again five years hence, except that Kitiara never showed up for the group's reunion. Wanting to learn more about her Solamnic father, she left Solace, heading north with Sturm, searching for him. They went on their separate ways as mentioned in Preludes: Light and Dark. However, they were lovers prior to their separation and Steel Brightblade was the result of this short relationship. During her travels she joined the newly formed Dragonarmies of Ansalon, and quickly rose in the ranks to become the Dragon Highlord of the Blue Dragonarmy. She became an ally of Lord Soth, managed to survive the War of the Lance, and led the attack on Palanthas during the Blue Lady's War. She was finally killed by Dalamar the Dark, the former apprentice of Raistlin, in the Tower Of High Sorcery in Palanthas after attempting to aid her brother in returning from the Abyss. Although deceased, Kitiara made a "surprise appearance" in Death Knights of Krynn.

=== Laura Majere ===
Laura Majere (373 AC –) is the daughter of Caramon and Tika Waylan Majere. Unlike her siblings or parents, Laura did not follow the life of an adventurer, instead she took over running the Inn of the Last Home from her parents. She had red hair, though it later turned white.

=== Laurana Kanan ===
Lauralanthalasa Kanan (her full name) was a young, exceptionally beautiful princess of the Qualinesti elves. At an early age she fell in love with her father's ward, Tanis Half-Elven, and during the War of the Lance she followed him off to war. Laurana was then forced to mature very quickly, going from a naive, spoiled princess to a general leading armies. She displayed remarkable leadership ability and became known as the Golden General as she led the Whitestone Forces to many victories in the War of the Lance. She was later tricked into captivity by her rival in love and war, the Dragon Highlord Kitiara Uth Matar, but was eventually rescued by Tanis. After the war ended she married Tanis and together they had a son, Gilthas. Long later during the War of Souls, Laurana led the fight against the green dragon overlord Beryl, helping to slay the dragon but at the cost of her own life.

Laurana is voiced by Caroline Gelabert in the animated feature Dragonlance: Dragons of Autumn Twilight.

=== Linsha Majere ===
Daughter of Palin and Usha Majere, Linsha joined the Knights of Solamnia in honor of her father's brothers. Linsha specializes in missions where stealth is an important factor, usually collecting information for the Knighthood. She became the first woman to ever join the Order of the Rose, the highest Order in the Solamnic Knighthood.

=== Magius ===
Magius is a mage who dons White, Red and Black robes, as well as becoming a renegade wizard for a time. He is the companion of Huma Dragonbane and aids Huma in the fight against Takhisis. Magius is killed by Galan Dracos when he is captured and tortured by him. His spellbook was kept in the Tower of High Sorcery until it was given to Palin Majere, who used a powerful war-spell even Magius could not use. The spell damaged the book, but it meant little as magic had left the world with the Gods of Magic. His staff is also in one of the most powerful magical objects and later it was used by Raistlin and Palin Majere. As a consequence of his death by the hand of Dracos, Huma decreed that from that time forward, all mages would be permitted to carry a small bladed weapon to aid in their defence when they had not the opportunity to cast their spells to that end.

=== Mina ===
Mina was an orphan Goldmoon took in at the Citadel of Light. She could not remember what had happened to her before a shipwreck left her on Schallsea. She was drawn away from the island by Takhisis, posing as the One God, when she was 14. When she was 17 she emerged from the Storm that marked the beginning the War of Souls. She went on to lead the armies of Neraka, once knights of Takhisis, to conquer much of Ansalon—especially Solanthus, Sanction and Silvanesti. She reunited with her adopted mother, Goldmoon, in the Tower of High Sorcery in Nightlund, which led to the rediscovery of Krynn by the other true gods. At the end of the War of Souls, after having vanquished two Dragon Overlords (Malys and Skie), she was willing to give her life for Takhisis, now mortal, but was thwarted in that action by Silvanoshei who killed the Dark Queen before she could take Mina's life.

Since then, Mina has left the hiding place where she left the corpse of her deceased Queen. For a time she served Chemosh, god of (Un)Death, and was the source of the blight that would be known as the Beloved of Chemosh. Mina's powers again inadvertently manifest, causing the beloved to serve her rather than the God of Death. Eventually it was revealed by Majere that Mina was a God of Light, tricked by Queen Takhisis into serving her. Mina refused to join the pantheons of Light or Darkness, and became the Goddess of Tears. Her symbol is an amber teardrop. In the last series, she kills Nightshade, Rhys Mason's friend.

=== Palin Majere ===
The youngest son of Caramon and Tika Waylan Majere, Palin studied magic and wore the white robes of good. He traveled often with his brothers, Sturm and Tanin Majere, while they were trying to finish their quests to become Knights of Solamnia. He was with Tanin and Sturm when they were killed by enemies. However, the enemies decided to hold Palin for ransom. He later plays a large role in the Chaos War and casts an incredibly powerful war spell, written in a spell book of Magius on Chaos. After Takhisis steals Krynn, at the end of the Chaos War, his magic waned. He opened a magic school in Solace, where he taught apprentices how to use what little was left of the magic of Krynn. Later, during the Fifth Age Trilogy, by Jean Rabe, he joins the Heroes of the Heart and helps stop Malys from becoming a god. During the War of Souls he is portrayed as aged and bitter, due to the loss of magic and the hardships he had to endure at the hands of dragon overlords. He is one of the major characters in that saga too, accompanying Tasselhof and Gerard in bringing the gods back to Krynn. He is currently the mayor of Solace, having given up the magic after the War of Souls.

=== Palthainon ===
General Palthainon, also termed "senator" and "prefect," was introduced in The Puppet King written by Douglas Niles. Palthanion is a manipulative character who influences Gilthas, son of Tanis Half-Elven. During the War of Souls, he attempts to rise into a higher position by convincing Silvanesti and Qualinesti elves that Gilthas was not a good leader and that without Palthainon's assistance Gilthas would not be leader, much to Gilthas's annoyance.

=== Par-Salian ===
Par-Salian was a white-robed mage and leader of the Conclave of the Tower of High Sorcery in Wayreth in the time around the War of the Lance.

Par-Salian was the testmaster of Raistlin Majere when he took the Test of High Sorcery. When confronted with the young mage's arrogance and cynicism, Par-Salian cursed Raistlin in the final stages of the test, giving him hourglass eyes that allow Raistlin to see things only as they wither and die, apparently to teach Raistlin compassion. It did not have the intended effect.

After the passing of the Test, which veers out of Par-Salian's control due to the intervention of Fistandantilus, Par-Salian also gives Raistlin the very powerful staff of Magius as compensation for the physical breakdown Raistlin experiences in his fight against a dark elf, leaving his innards broken, his skin golden and his hair white.

When Raistlin travels back in time to become one with Fistandantilus, Par-Salian compels Caramon Majere and Tasslehoff Burrfoot to come to the Tower of Wayreth, then sends them both back in time to stop Raistlin. In a timeline that might have happened, had not Tasslehoff Burrfoot altered it with a Time Travel Device, Par-Salian would be cursed by Raistlin to be petrified, but only from the waist down, then made to watch as the last living human while Raistlin destroys the entire world.

=== Raistlin Majere ===
Twin brother of Caramon Majere, Raistlin was a frail and sickly boy, who was often bullied as a youth, causing him to develop an arrogance and hatred of other people. Due to his half-sister Kitiara's intervention, he was sponsored and accepted into the Academy of Magic, becoming an adept student. His passion for the magic arts fueled his will, driving him to sacrifice even his health in order to become a mage. When he took the Test, the Heads of the Tower in Wayreth Forest feared his arrogance and ambition so much that they cursed his sight, causing him to see the inevitable decay of all creatures, in the hopes that this would teach him compassion, but it only increased his bitterness. Without his use of magic to save Tasslehoff Burrfoot during the War of the Lance, the Heroes would have all perished at Neraka; but he only did this because he eventually desired to overthrow Takhisis himself and did not wish to see her enter the world until he had grown strong enough to defeat her and take her place. Years later, he strove for godhood as he went on a quest through the past for the spellbooks of Fistandantilus in an attempt to become Krynn's new God of Evil. Caramon's journey to the future showed that he would have defeated Takhisis and all of the gods, but Raistlin chose to turn aside from his path because he was told of this vision by Caramon and Crysania and shown that because he only learned to destroy, never to create, as a god he would rule only an empty universe and be alone forever. Thus, he chose instead to sacrifice himself to an eternity in the Abyss, as the new gate and bar to Takhisis' will entering Krynn.

Due to a lonely childhood, Raistlin developed a cold personality for all but the lowliest creatures of Krynn. This aspect of his personality leads to him befriending the gully dwarf Bupu. Raistlin Majere's soul was partially merged with that of the ancient archmage Fistandantilus, the first archmage who originally tried to become a god and the one whose evils inspired Raistlin's own quest for godhood. He is the final ward on the Protector's Path to Godshome as the Paragon of Power and Sacrifice. He is the only one of the protector's souls that is visible without looking into the Astral Plane, and the only Neutral or Evil individual to guard the path. Advanced Dungeons & Dragons Adventure Gamebooks #4 Soulforge allowed the reader to take the role of Raistlin and attempt to pass the Test of High Sorcery. Kiefer Sutherland headlined the animated film Dragonlance: Dragons of Autumn Twilight, voicing Raistlin, who was one of the main characters in the film. The tag line of the film "Chaos. War. Death. This is what I see" is a quote from Raistlin.

=== Riverwind ===
Grandson of Wanderer of the Que Shu, Riverwind was a sheepherder who fell in love with Goldmoon, the chieftain's daughter. After fulfilling a quest to discover proof of the true gods in order to prove his worth (successfully returning with Mishakal's Blue Crystal Staff), he was sentenced to death for blasphemy. The crystal staff spirited him and Goldmoon away, managing to rescue them by taking them to Solace where they met up with Tanis Half-Elven and companions. Phil LaMarr voices Riverwind and Gilthanas in the animated Dragonlance: Dragons of Autumn Twilight film. Riverwind appears as one of the player characters in Advanced Dungeons & Dragons: Heroes of the Lance.

=== Silvanoshei ===
Silvanoshei is the son of Alhana Starbreeze and Porthios Kanan, and briefly the Speaker of the Stars, leader of the Silvanesti elves. He is kept from martial matters, and as such has little respect from the soldiers of his mother. On the night of the Great Storm, he is brought into the nation of Silvanesti by bypassing the shield that surrounds the city, put there by green dragon Cyan Bloodbane. He is taken to Silvanost and is made Speaker of the Stars, but is but a puppet to the General Konnal, who had served as the Regent of the nation. He falls in love with the mysterious Mina, the prophet of the One God (Takhisis). He then, at Mina's behest, destroys the shield around the nation and allows the Knights of Neraka to invade and conquer the elves. He trails Mina to Sanction and witnesses the downfall of Takhisis. When she is about to kill Mina, he throws a broken dragonlance into the now mortal Takhisis, killing her. Mina kills him in turn, and he is laid to rest in the Tomb of the Last Heroes in Solace.

=== Silvara ===
Silvara is a silver dragon and sister to Gwyneth, the former silver dragon that bonded with Huma. Following in her sisters footsteps, while in her Wilder Elf form, she attracts the attention of Gilthanas, an elf who is son of the Speaker of the Suns for the Qualinesti clan. As she helps the companions escape with a Dragon Orb from the Qualinesti settlement, the two fall in love. Later they travel together on a secret mission to discover the ugly truth about what became of the good dragon eggs being held hostage by the Dragonarmy.

=== Silveran ===
Silveran is the son of Kith-Kanan and Anaya. He is the second Speaker of the Suns. After bursting forth from the tree that was formerly his mother (upon her death while she was still pregnant with him, she became a tree), he is taken to Qualinesti. He is made successor to the throne, and his half brother Ulvian is jealous of this. He uses magic to trick Silveran into striking his father, and Kith-Kanan is mortally wounded. Kith-Kanan, on his deathbed, pardons Ulvian and confirms Silveran his successor.

=== Sithel ===
Sithel is the second Speaker of the Stars, the son of Silvanos (founder of the elven nation Silvanesti), and the father of Sithas and Kith-Kanan. His son Kith-Kanan, after leaving the capital and building the city of Sithelbec, invites his father to come to visit. While there, Sithel is assassinated and the mantle of Speaker of the Stars is passed on to his son Sithas.

=== Solostaran Kanan ===
The Speaker of the Suns during the War of the Lance. He is in direct descent from the elf king Kith-Kanan. His children, Porthios, Gilthanas and Laurana all play key roles in the War of the Lance. During the Council of Whitestone, only Fizban (the avatar for Paladine) and Tasslehoff Burrfoot keep Solostaran and the other heads of the council from wrongfully taking the dragon orb to combat Takhisis.

=== Steel Brightblade ===
The son of Sturm Brightblade and Kitiara Uth Matar, Steel was tormented by the internal conflict between his good and evil side. Joining the Knights of Takhisis after an invitation by Ariakan, he became a Knight of the Lily. He learned the identity of his father after a meeting with Caramon Majere and Tanis Half-Elven, after which his internal struggle became more evident. He was killed by Chaos during the Chaos war and was laid in the Tomb of the Last Heroes. He is the Paragon of Redemption, standing across from his father, on the Protector's Path to Godshome.

=== Sturm Brightblade ===
The son of a Knight of Solamnia, Sturm and his mother were forced to escape from their castle in Solamnia following an uprising. Despite having lost contact with his father, Sturm continued to follow the rules set by the Code and the Measure, focusing on becoming a Knight of Solamnia. He is killed in action by Kitiara, bearer of his child and his ex-lover, while defending the High Clerist's Tower in Palanthas. During the Age of Mortals it is shown that when viewing "beyond the veil" and into the Astral Plane, he is one of the protectors of the path to Godshome as the Paragon of Discipline.

Jeff Gerke called Sturm a great example of "The Principled Hero". Describing Sturm's actions as "maddening" to his compatriots, Gerke went on to write, "while people might object to Sturm's internal code of conduct, it was impossible not to like the man." Gerke argued that Sturm's strong code of ethics makes him a character with whom the reader can connect, whether or not the reader agrees with his decisions. Montse Sant in her work The Book of the Dragon called Sturm "the brave noble".

Sturm Brightblade is voiced by Marc Worden in the animated feature Dragonlance: Dragons of Autumn Twilight.

=== Sturm Majere ===
The second son of Caramon and Tika Majere, Sturm was named after Sturm Brightblade. Like his older brother Tanin, he had wanted to become a knight since his youth, and joined Tanin in applying to the Knighthood. Sturm was squired and knighted almost at the same time as Tanin, and the siblings traveled together with their youngest brother, Palin Majere.

Sturm died just before the outbreak of the Chaos War, when the Dark Knights of Takhisis assaulted Kalaman. His body rests in Solace.

=== Tanin Majere ===
Tanin was the eldest son of Caramon and Tika Majere. Named after Tanis Half-Elven, he had red curly hair and green eyes, like his mother. During his youth, he adventured with Sturm and Palin Majere, searching for adventures to prove their worth to the Knights of Solamnia. He was eventually knighted, becoming the first Majere to join the Order of the Crown.

While on patrol duty, the Majere siblings discovered a fleet of boats approaching the coast. Instead of running away, their group stayed on the beach, awaiting the enemy. Although vastly outnumbered, they fought bravely. Ultimately, the patrol party was defeated, leading to the death of Tanin and Sturm Majere.

=== Tanis Half-Elven ===
Tanis Half-Elven (elven name Tanthalas Quisif-Nan Pah) is considered the leader of a group of heroes that prevented the evil goddess Takhisis from returning to Ansalon during the War of the Lance. After the War of the Lance, he spent his time trying to maintain peace between two rivaling countries. He married Laurana, a Qualinesti princess who was never able to stop loving Tanis, even when he was kicked out of the Qualinesti Kingdom.

While defending the High Clerist's Tower from the Knights of Takhisis, Tanis came face to face with Steel Brightblade, fighting for the enemy side. He saved Steel's life in mid-battle, only to be cut down from behind by a brute warrior under Steel's command. Steel saw the spirit of his father, Sturm Brightblade, carry Tanis away from the battle. Tanis and Laurana had one son: Gilthas Pathfinder. In the animated Dragonlance: Dragons of Autumn Twilight film, Tanis is voiced by Michael Rosenbaum. Tanis appears as one of the player characters in Advanced Dungeons & Dragons: Heroes of the Lance.

=== Tasslehoff Burrfoot ===
A kender who arrived in Solace during his wanderlust and promptly settled himself in Flint Fireforge's house. Tasslehoff became a good friend of the Companions and aided in The War of the Lance. Tasslehoff (or Tas, as he is known by his friends) also played a large role in the War of Souls, frequently time traveling to various ages on wild adventures.

During the War of the Twins trilogy, Tasslehoff has to come to terms with the fact that what he does or does not do has an effect on those around him, while he is assisting Caramon Majere on his quest to stop his twin brother Raistlin from attaining godhood and dooming the world of Krynn.

Tasslehoff takes part in the Chaos War, dying while wounding Chaos himself to draw the God's blood for the Graygem. Seconds before being crushed by Chaos, Tasselhoff time-travels to a time 50 years later, to deliver the eulogy to Caramon's funeral and inadvertently becomes the catalyst for the events detailed in the War of Souls, culminating in the return of the Gods, the Death of Takhisis and Paladine becoming mortal. After these events Tasslehoff is taken back in time to be crushed by Chaos. He is shown to be spared the pain and as only chicken feathers were found where his dead body was supposed to be. He is later shown to join Flint under the tree, near the Great Forge of Reorx.

Tasslehoff appears as one of the player characters in Advanced Dungeons & Dragons: Heroes of the Lance. Tasslehoff also appears as a player character in Dragons of Flame, where one reviewer describes him as "a rather fat mamma with ginormous ears".

Tasslehoff is voiced by Jason Marsden in the animated feature Dragonlance: Dragons of Autumn Twilight.

=== Tika Waylan ===
Tika was the adopted daughter of Otik Sandath, owner of the Inn of the Last Home before the War of the Lance. Her true father, the conman Alleran Waylan, disappeared shortly after her tenth birthday. Despite being a simple inn's maid, Tika is also brave and spunky; she has been known for whacking Draconians in the face with her frying pan, and coming with Caramon on adventures on occasion. When she joined the Companions from slavery to Pax Tharkas, her initial ineptitude at sword wielding led to her proficiency in shield bashing, and even developing it into an art, especially effective against baaz draconians who turn to stone when they die as a blade will be stuck until the stone disintegrates.

She married Caramon Majere during the War of the Lance. Otik retired and left his Inn in charge of the couple. Tika is also known for her loveliness and kindness. Her fragility in love has given her some disadvantages at times.

Tracy Hickman explained that the Dragonlance design group wanted to have a balanced and typical group in terms of role-playing games, and thought Tika as the female warrior of the party. Margaret Weis attributed her appearance because the artists wanted to have a "babe" to paint.

In later novels, they had five children: Tanin, Sturm, Palin, Laura and Dezra Majere. Sturm and Tanin were later killed off.

Tika is voiced by Michelle Trachtenberg in the animated feature Dragonlance: Dragons of Autumn Twilight.

Jason Heller, of The A.V. Club, identifies Tika as one of the more charismatic characters in the series, as her "no-nonsense fierceness and agency, not to mention her job as a waitress, reminded me of my mom when I was a kid—gets a compelling story arc. It isn't exactly as evolved in terms of feminism as it could be, but is still miles ahead of many popular fantasy novels of the era."

Lauren Davis of io9 notes that "Tika, a barmaid who has been swept up in the action" and comments on her as one of the strong female characters: "Tika, who in times of peace is more hearth mother than warrior, but when pressed in action will pick up a knife (or a frying pan) to defend herself and her friends). The women of Krynn are much like the men—no better and no worse. (Although some of them did tend to be a bit less dressed than their male counterparts in the artwork.)"

=== Ulin Majere ===
Son of Palin and Usha Majere, Ulin became a white-robed wizard. He also became good friends with a gold dragon, Sunrise.

=== "Uncle" Trapspringer ===
A kender of some renown whom other kender tell extraordinary tales about, while all claiming he is their uncle. After the Chaos War, kender begin telling stories of their "Uncle" Tasselhoff.

Trapspringer Furrfoot is known to be the actual uncle of Tasslehoff Burrfoot and Earwig Lockpicker.

Trapspringer makes his appearance in the five years prior to the War of the Lance, travelling with a human named Phineas around Kendermore. They search for and find Damaris Metwinger, the betrothed of Trapspringer's actual nephew, Tasslehoff. Eventually Damaris and Trapspringer fall in love, deciding to marry, which also relieves Tas of his betrothal. Trapspringer plays a large part in keeping one of the portals closed which the Dark Queen tried to use to re-enter Krynn.

=== Usha Majere ===
Usha Majere is married to Palin Majere. She lives with and is raised by the Irda, the original ogre race before their fall from grace, until just before the Chaos War, when the Irda send her away before breaking the Graygem of Gargath. She meets up with several characters in Palanthas, and later travels to the Abyss to fight Chaos. She collects a drop of his blood in the Graygem and banishes the particular aspect of Chaos. She marries Palin later, and later reveals to him she cheated on him during the time he becomes absorbed in himself.

At the start of her arrival in the human land, Usha is mistakenly believed to be the rumored daughter of Raistlin Majere. Her almost white colored hair and golden colored eyes cause this belief. She is even beginning to believe her parentage when Raistlin appears in person once again and assures her he is not her father. Raistlin told Usha that her parents were captured by Minotaur slavers. They jumped from the ship in an attempt to escape. They prayed to the goddess Zeboim. She gave them ship wreckage to float on. After floating at sea they found themselves at the Irda's island. While there, her father was accidentally killed by the Irda. They were just trying to teach him a lesson, but their magic was too powerful. After she was born, her mother walked into the sea and drowned.

=== Wanderer the Elder ===
Wanderer was Riverwind's grandfather, notable for being one of the only Que-Shu to still believe in the ancient gods, perhaps instilling those beliefs in Riverwind.

=== Wanderer (Riverwind's Son) ===
Wanderer, son of Riverwind and Goldmoon, was born 352 AC and named in honor of Riverwind's grandfather, Wanderer the Elder. He later had a son of his own, but during the Chaos War, when shadow wights attacked the tribe, his child's mother was essentially wiped from existence, with not even Wanderer able to remember her. Wanderer saves the Qualinesti people by guiding them through the Plains of Dust.

== Renowned groups ==
There are some renowned groups of people who are considered heroes for their acts in times of war, including the Heroes of the Lance, the Last Heroes and the Heroes of the Heart.

=== Heroes of the Lance ===
The heroes of the original Dragonlance trilogy, the Heroes of the Lance set the stage for the heroes of later books. The Heroes of the Lance took part in the War of the Lance, and were instrumental in helping to end that conflict. Members of this group are known as Companions. They included among them Sturm Brightblade, Tasslehoff Burrfoot, Flint Fireforge, Tanis Half-Elven, Caramon and Raistlin Majere.

=== Last Heroes ===
Those who went to the Abyss to fight Chaos during the Chaos War are considered Last Heroes. Although most of them perished, Palin Majere and Usha managed to escape alive. Another survivor was a blue dragon infected by Chaos. Included in the ranks of these heroes are Steel Brightblade, Tasslehoff Burrfoot and several other unnamed Knights of Solamnia and Knights of Takhisis. These heroes have been entombed in Solace, at the Tomb of the Last Heroes. Although he perished before the battle, Tanis Half-Elven's body was laid to rest beside Steel's.

=== Heroes of the Heart ===
The Heroes of the Heart are those who engaged the Dragon Overlord Malystryx during her attempt to become a god of Krynn. Included among these heroes are Jasper Fireforge, Dhamon and several others.

=== Dragonarmies of Ansalon ===
The Dragonarmies of Ansalon are the collective armies used by Takhisis during the War of the Lance. They each contain a certain color of chromatic dragons and are led by a Highlord. They are ultimately all defeated in various stages. They are split into five branches, the Red, Black, Green, Blue and White, all of which are led by a number of Highlords.

=== Knights of Solamnia ===
The Knights of Solamnia, also called the Solamnic Knights, are a chivalric order, a "brotherhood forged when Krynn was young". The Knighthood requires the help of a conscripted army, footmen, usually local guards, militia and mercenaries, acting under the commands of a Knight. They are not part of the knighthood itself. The Measure is a set of rules, written by Vinas Solamnus and held in thirty-seven 300-page volumes, conducting the life of a knight. During the time right before the Cataclysm, there were only 63 known Knights of Solamnia in Ansalon. These Knights worked for the good of Ansalon against the mounting problems arising from the centralization of power in the hands of the Kingpriest of Istar. They adhere strictly to their Oath: "My honor is life."

=== Knights of Takhisis ===
As a foil to the Knights of Solamnia, the Knights of Takhisis are organized, honorable and evil—a deadly combination. After the Chaos War, the name of the order was changed to the Knights of Neraka.

=== Legion of Steel ===
Founded by Sara Dunstan in the name of Steel Brightblade.

=== Wizards of High Sorcery ===
The Wizards of High Sorcery are a powerful institution in Krynn. They were founded when the deities Solinari, Lunitari and Nuitari taught a certain group of people how to draw power from the moons and shape it with their wills. With the construction of the Towers of High Sorcery, people from all over Krynn were able to learn the secrets of spellcrafting, that is, using specific words, gestures and rites to create magical effects in a safe and ordered manner. They were the creators of the dragonorbs, with all 3 robes' combined power during the waxing of all the 3 moons.

== Dragons ==
=== Cinder ===
A red dragon, whose real name is Fenalysten. During the Fourth Dragon War (the War of the Lance) Cinder was the mount of Baron Vilderoff Von Bladmere of the Dragonarmies. It is this pair that is featured on the cover of the "Red Dragon of Krynn" boxed set, featuring a Dark Knight armed with a Dragonlance, astride a mighty red wyrm, slaying a silver dragon. Vilderoff was informed that the lance would slay even the good metallic dragons by a dark cleric, Otto, and his own wizard, Danvil Felcraft. The lance, however, was permanently stained with the pure blood of the good dragons. Vilderoff and Cinder, early on in their career, acquired the fabled lance from a fallen Solamnic Knight sometime in 352 AC, and the human knight was made a baron by Emperor Ariakas, given the Bladmere lands bordering Neraka in Taman Busak. Vilderoff built a castle in the heart of Ravenwood Forest, as his command post. The castle was vast, and housed twenty knights, over 100 men-at-arms, 40 draconians, and 60 ogres and hobgoblins. Also, the Black Robe wizard Danvil Felcraft took up residence in the castle's West Tower. Vilderoff continued to hold onto the lands given him, and aided Ariakan, Ariakas' son and heir, in forming the Dark Knights of Takhisis. After Vilderoff's untimely death—ironically at the hands of his own assassin, Iain Lockhart, who was made into a Dragonspawn by Khellendros—his Dragonlance disappeared from its place of honor over the fireplace and mantle in the castle's great hall. After the baron's death, Cinder carved out his own domain, prior to the dragon purge. The mighty red wyrm is still at large in and around Bladmere, and the forested lands of that territory, a force to be reckoned with.

=== Cyan Bloodbane ===
Cyan Bloodbane, whose real name is K'Rshinthintl, is an enormous green dragon that resided in Silvanesti during the War of the Lance, mentally enslaving King Lorac Caladon, and creating a nightmare realm. Later in the War of the Lance he traveled to Neraka where, despite his dislike of personally fighting his enemies, got into a fight with a red dragon. During the battle he slew the young dragon, who happened to be a favorite of Takhisis. He was imprisoned in the dungeons under Neraka for a time (it is believed Takhisis feared the influence he might have on her followers and imprisoned for that reason; however, the truth is not certain). He is known more for his deception, trickery, cunning and magic than for his physical might, and is known to be incredibly self-serving. He is one of the most cruel and vicious dragons known. During the Third Dragon War (before the War of the Lance) Cyan served Galan Dracos (a powerful wizard that served Takhisis) who trained Cyan in the use of magic, understanding mortal races and the domination of mortal races. After the War of the Lance, he serves Raistlin Majere until Raistlin's death. Cyan returned to Silvanesti where he intended to bring about the end of the Silvanesti. However, Mina arrived and revealed Cyan (who had taken the form of an elf) as a dragon, Cyan attempted to escape but he was wounded by Silvanesti archers and fell in the forest outside Silvanost where he was (and mostly still is) believed to have perished.

=== Darlantan ===
Darlantan is a Silver Dragon created in The Dragons and is volume six of the expansion series Lost Histories. Darlantan is the main character introduced in the first story within the novel. The novel details the return of dragons of both good and evil to the fictional world of Krynn. The dragons are shown as they grow to have vastly different traits, all of which differentiate them from their brethren and in turn come to be shown as traits not just of those individual dragons but of the different types as well. The novel expands somewhat to the other dragons but centers mainly on the antagonistic relationships between the red and silver dragons.

== Dragon Overlords ==
The Dragon Overlords are massive dragons introduced in the Dawning of a New Age Trilogy. The Dragon Overlords gain their title, and presumably size as some native dragons grew as huge as the alien dragons, from magical items called Dragon Totems that are made of the skulls and souls of slain dragons, these devices increase a Dragon's magical power and allow them to change their surrounding area into a terrain that pleases the Dragon Overlord. Most Dragon Overlords were from an alien world where Dragonkind is the only intelligent race, they were able to access Krynn as a result of the movement of Krynn by Takhisis.

=== Beryllinthranox ===
Beryl is a gigantic green dragon who makes her residence in Qualinesti. She is obsessed with finding magical artifacts to augment her power. She has Palin Majere captured and tortured, as well as destroying the Academy of Sorcery. Beryl is slain when she attacks Qualinost and is brought down by Laurana wielding a Dragonlance.

=== Khellendros ===
Khellendros, formerly known as Skie, is a massive blue dragon who resides in Solamnia. He is brought from an alien world for the War of the Lance by Takhisis. Khellendros is the steed of Kitiara uth Matar in the War of the Lance. He is fatally wounded by Mina after he refused to further worship Takhisis, and is later killed by Malystryx.

=== Malystryx ===
Malystryx, or Malys is the largest and most powerful of the Dragon Overlords, a great red. Malystryx was from another world. Despite her massive size, she was actually quite small among the dragons of her native world. Malystryx was one of the first Dragons to build a Skull Totem. Malystryx's Skull Totem continued to keep her realm a volcanic wasteland after her death, the reason for this is unknown as most of the other Dragon Overlord's Skull Totems lose their power after their creator is slain. She ruled over the eastern lands, changing them into volcanic wastelands to suit her tastes. She made an attempt at godhood but was brought down by the Heroes of the Heart in the Dragons of a New Age trilogy. She did battle with Mina, mounted on a Dracolich, over the city of Sanction and was killed by Mina.

=== Onysablet ===
Onysablet, or Sable, was a great black dragon who resided around the ogre realms of Kern and Blöde. She is fond of making corrupt dragonspawn in odd shapes. She brought down the dwarf mystic Jasper Fireforge at the battle between the Dragon Overlords and the Heroes of the Heart. She is eventually killed by Dhamon Grimwulf in the novel Lake of Death.

=== Gellidus ===
Gellidus was an enormous white dragon. He was also known as Frost. He used to reside in Southern Ergoth and has turned it into a frozen wasteland. He gave a group of ogres in the area residence in the city of Daltigoth. He was killed in the gaming supplement Price of Courage by a group of intrepid adventurers with Huma's Dragonlance.
