= List of Dragonlance modules and sourcebooks =

Dragonlance modules and sourcebooks are role-playing game books created for the Dragonlance campaign setting. These books were created for multiple editions of Dungeons & Dragons and for the SAGA System.

== Overview ==
Dragonlance Adventures

The Atlas of the Dragonlance World

Player's Guide to the Dragonlance Campaign

The Dragonlance game project began with Tracy and Laura Hickman, and the idea of a world dominated by dragons. As they drove from Utah to Wisconsin so Tracy could take up a job with TSR in 1981, they discussed this idea. In 1982, Tracy proposed at TSR a series of three modules featuring evil dragons. When this plan reached then head of TSR Gary Gygax, it fitted well with an idea he had considered of doing a series of 12 modules each based on one of the official Monster Manual dragons. The project was then developed, under the code name "Project Overlord" to plan the series. The original group included Tracy Hickman, Harold Johnson, Larry Elmore, Carl Smith and Jeff Grubb. Later in the development process it was decided that a trilogy of fantasy novels would be released with the modules. Originally an external writer was hired, but the design group found themselves more and more disillusioned with his work. At this point it was suggested that Hickman and Margaret Weis, an editor in TSR's book department who had become involved with the project, ought to write the books. They wrote the five chapters over a weekend and were given the job to write the accompanying novels based on that. The first module, Dragons of Despair, was published in March 1984. Then in November 1984, Dragons of Autumn Twilight was published. This novel was written after the completion of the first Dragonlance game modules. Weis and Hickman felt this was constraining and made the novel feel too episodic, so they reversed the process for the next books and completed the novels before the related modules were written. The first Krynn setting guide, Dragonlance Adventures, would follow in 1987.

When AD&D was updated to the 2nd edition in 1989, the Dragonlance campaign setting was updated as well. In 1993, the product line for AD&D was canceled. However, the Dragonlance fiction line "remained wildly successful" and included "some 60 novels and anthologies"; "TSR wanted to bring those fiction fans back into the roleplaying fold if they could, and so a new team was set to work to create a new Dragonlance game". In 1996, Dragonlance was converted to TSR's new SAGA System with the publication of the Dragonlance: Fifth Age roleplaying game. The SAGA System has a more narrative focused gameplay style than AD&D and uses cards to determine the effects of actions. Shannon Appelcline commented that "the non-AD&D game was not to everyone's taste, but it was extensively supported from 1996–2000, with a timeline that pushed considerably into Krynn's future". The majority of the SAGA line was set during 414 AC, however, the final releases of the line were set in 383 AC.

After Wizards of the Coast's acquisition of TSR, the 3rd Edition of Dungeons & Dragons was released in 2000 and Wizards announced that the Dragonlance setting would not be supported. However, Wizards allowed a group of fans to support the line for the 3rd Edition on the internet. Initially, the Dragonlance-L mailing list updated the setting; this mailing list would become known as the Whitestone Council and would maintain The Dragonlance Nexus website. The Whitestone Council was supported by both Tracy Hickman and Margaret Weis. Then in 2002, Margaret Weis's company Sovereign Press acquired the license to publish 3rd Edition Dragonlance material. The official update, Dragonlance Campaign Setting, was published in 2003 for the 3.5 Edition; it moved the timeline to 422 AC and was set six months "after the end of the War of Souls trilogy (2000–2002)". Appelcline highlighted that "the Whitestone Council was asked to review Sovereign's manuscript and in a few cases also got to submit minor bits for the new setting book. The Council would continue to be important to Sovereign following the publication of the Dragonlance Campaign Setting, with a few members contributing increasingly large amounts to later releases". Sovereign Press maintained the Dragonlance line until 2007.

The campaign setting was not supported during the 4th Edition era (2008–2013) of Dungeons & Dragons. In March 2022, Wizards released the PDF Heroes of Krynn which is part of the "Unearthed Arcana" public playtest series for the 5th Edition of Dungeons & Dragons. Polygon commented that this "all but confirmed" the return of the Dragonlance setting. In April 2022, it was announced that the setting will be revisited in December 2022 with a new adventure module for the 5th Edition. This adventure will be set concurrently to the War of the Lance, a fictional conflict in the setting.

== Advanced Dungeons & Dragons 1st/2nd Edition ==
Title	Author(s)	Year	ISBN	Notes
DL - Dragonlance Modules
DL1 Dragons of Despair	Tracy Hickman	1984	0-88038-086-1	
DL2 Dragons of Flame	Douglas Niles	1984	0-88038-087-X	
DL3 Dragons of Hope	Tracy Hickman	1984	0-88038-088-8	
DL4 Dragons of Desolation	Tracy Hickman, Michael Dobson, with Harold Johnson and Bruce Nesmith	1984	0-88038-089-6	
DL5 Dragons of Mystery	Michael Dobson	1984	0-88038-090-X	
DL6 Dragons of Ice	Douglas Niles	1985	0-88038-091-8	
DL7 Dragons of Light	Jeff Grubb	1985	0-88038-093-4	
DL8 Dragons of War	Tracy and Laura Hickman	1985	0-88038-097-7	
DL9 Dragons of Deceit	Douglas Niles	1985	0-88038-095-0	
DL10 Dragons of Dreams	Tracy Hickman	1985	0-88038-098-5	
DL11 Dragons of Glory	Douglas Niles and Tracy Hickman,	1986	0-88038-094-2	
DL12 Dragons of Faith	Harold Johnson, Bruce Heard	1986	0-88038-092-6	
DL13 Dragons of Truth	Tracy Hickman	1986	0-88038-318-6	
DL14 Dragons of Triumph	Douglas Niles	1986	0-88038-096-9	
DL15 Mists of Krynn	Mike Breault	1988	0-88038-574-X	
DL16 World of Krynn	Douglas Niles, Michael Gray, Harold Johnson	1988	0-88038-609-6	
Sourcebooks
Dragonlance Adventures	Tracy Hickman, Margaret Weis	1987	0-88038-452-2	
The Atlas of the Dragonlance World	Karen Wynn Fonstad	1987	0-88038-448-4	
Player's Guide to the Dragonlance Campaign	David "Zeb" Cook, Michael Dobson, Jeff Grubb, Tracy Hickman, Harold Johnson, Douglas Niles, Margaret Weis	1993	1-56076-698-0	
Boxed sets
Time of the Dragon	David "Zeb" Cook	1989	0-88038-773-4	
Tales of the Lance	Harold Johnson, John Terra, J. Robert King, Wolfgang Baur, Colin McComb, Jean Rabe, Norm Ritchie	1992	1-56076-338-8	Includes a Talis deck, maps, a DM screen and the 176-page sourcebook World Book of Ansalon. This sourcebook is the first major setting update since Dragonlance Adventures (1987).
Dwarven Kingdoms of Krynn	Douglas Niles	1993	1-56076-669-7	Narrative focused sourcebook on dwarven civilization; highlights six dwarven kingdoms: Kal-Thax, Thorin, Thorbardin, Thoradin, Kayolin, and Zhakar.
DLA - Dragonlance Adventures
DLA1: Dragon Dawn	Deborah Christian	1990	0-88038-823-4	Adventure scenario set on the continent of Taladas, in which the player characters must save neutral dragons from being killed.
DLA2: Dragon Knight	Rick Swan	1990	0-88038-843-9	
DLA3: Dragon's Rest	Rick Swan	1990	0-88038-869-2	
DLC - Dragonlance Classics
DLC1: Classics Volume I	Hickman, Niles, and Dobson	1990	0-88038-859-5	Reprint of DL1, DL2, DL3 and DL4
DLC2: Classics Volume II	Grubb, Hickman, and Niles	1993	1-56076-570-4	Reprint of DL6, DL7, DL8 and DL9
DLC3: Classics Volume III	Grubb, Hickman, and Niles	1994	1-56076-885-1	Reprint of DL10, DL12, DL13 and DL14
DLE - Dragonlance Expansions
DLE1: In Search of Dragons	Rick Swan	1989	0-88038-681-9	
DLE2: Dragon Magic	Rick Swan	1989	0-88038-740-8	
DLE3: Dragon Keep	Rick Swan	1990	0-88038-764-5	
DLQ - Dragonlance Quests
DLQ1: Knight's Sword	Colin McComb, Thomas M. Reid	1992	1 -56076-421 -X	
DLQ2: Flint's Axe	Tim Beach	1992	1-56076-422-8	
DLR - Dragonlance Resources
DLR1: Otherlands	Haring, Bennie, and Tierra	1990	0-88038-829-3	A geographic supplement.
DLR2: Taladas: The Minotaurs	Colin McComb	1991	1-56076-150-4	A racial supplement.
DLR3: Unsung Heroes	Tim Beach	1992	1-56076-423-6	An NPC supplement.
DLS - Dragonlance Supplements
DLS1: New Beginnings	Mark Acres	1991	1-56076-062-1	An adventure which introduces both Dragonlance and AD&D to new players.
DLS2: Tree Lords	John Terra	1991	1-56076-125-3	
DLS3: Oak Lords	Blake Mobley	1991	1-56076-133-4	
DLS4: Wild Elves	Scott Bennie	1991	1-56076-140-7	
DLT - Dragonlance Tales
DLT1: New Tales: The Land Reborn	John Terra	1993	1-56076-607-7	Dragonlance adventure anthology.
DLT2: Dragonlance Book of Lairs	Skip Williams, Nicky Rea	1993	1-56076-630-1	Dragonlance adventure anthology.

== SAGA System ==
Title	Author(s)	Year	ISBN	Notes
Boxed sets
Dragonlance: Fifth Age	William W. Connors, Sue Weinlein Cook	1996	0-7869-0535-2	Includes a deck of cards, a map and three books: The Book of the Fifth Age, Dusk or Dawn, and Heroes of the New Age.
Heroes of Steel	Skip Williams	1996	0-7869-0539-5	Includes a map and two books: Book one (expands on rules from The Book of the Fifth Age) and Book two (adventure module The Rising Storm). Splatbook focuses on the warrior archetype. Adventure corresponds to Jean Rabe's Dragons of a New Age novel trilogy (1996–1998).
Heroes of Defiance	Steve Miller	1997	0-7869-0656-1	Splatbook focuses on the rogue archetype. Adventure corresponds to Jean Rabe's Dragons of a New Age novel trilogy (1996–1998).
Heroes of Sorcery	Stan!	1997	0-7869-0680-4	Splatbook focuses on the sorcerer archetype. Adventure corresponds to Jean Rabe's Dragons of a New Age novel trilogy (1996–1998).
Heroes of Hope	Duane Maxwell, Steve Miller	1997	0-7869-0707-X	Splatbook focuses on the mystic archetype. Adventure corresponds to Jean Rabe's Dragons of a New Age novel trilogy (1996–1998).
The Last Tower: The Legacy of Raistlin	Skip Williams	1997	0-7869-0538-7	Adventure corresponds to Jean Rabe's Dragons of a New Age novel trilogy (1996–1998).
Citadel of Light	Miranda Horner, Steve Miller, Stan!	1998	0-7869-0748-7	Setting book linked to Heroes of Hope.
Wings of Fury	Douglas Niles	1998	0-7869-0722-3	Concludes the Dragons of a New Age adventure line which began with Heroes of Steel.
Supplements
A Saga Companion	William W. Connors, Stan!, Skip Williams	1998	0-7869-1197-2	
The Bestiary	Dale "Slade" Henson, Harold Johnson, Stan!	1998	0-7869-0795-9	A narrative focused bestiary.
Palanthas	Stan!	1998	0-7869-1199-9	An in-character setting book focused on the city of Palanthas.
Battle Lines
The Sylvan Veil	William W. Connors, Miranda Horner	1999	0-7869-1329-0	Required SAGA System or Advanced Dungeons & Dragons.
Rise of the Titans	Richard Dakan	2000	0-7869-1396-7	Required SAGA System or Advanced Dungeons & Dragons.
Chaos War Adventures
Seeds of Chaos	Douglas Niles	1998	0-7869-1198-0	Required SAGA System or Advanced Dungeons & Dragons.
Chaos Spawn	Douglas Niles	1999	0-7869-1372-X	Required SAGA System or Advanced Dungeons & Dragons.
Miscellaneous
Dragonlance Classics: 15th Anniversary Edition	Steve Miller, Stan! Brown	1999	0-7869-1350-9	Rewrite of the original Dragonlance Chronicles adventures. Required SAGA System or Advanced Dungeons & Dragons.
Fate Deck	Steven Brown, Steve Miller, Ed Stark	1998	0-7869-1145-X	Sold both as part of the boxed set, and separately.

== Systemless ==
Title	Author(s)	Year	ISBN	Notes
ILH - Inn of the Last Home
Leaves from the Inn of the Last Home	Margaret Weis, Tracy Hickman	1987	0-88038-465-4	Sourcebook of roleplay materials which includes a compilation of short stories and mythology. It also features poetry, song and real world recipes for the War of the Lance campaign setting.
More Leaves From the Inn of the Last Home	Margaret Weis, Tracy Hickman	2000	0-7869-1516-1	Sourcebook of roleplay materials which includes a compilation of short stories and mythology. It also features poetry, song and real world recipes for the War of the Lance campaign setting.
Lost Leaves From the Inn of the Last Home	Margaret Weis	2007	0-8803-8465-4	Sourcebook of roleplay materials which includes a compilation of short stories and mythology. It also features poetry, song and real world recipes for the Age of Mortals campaign setting.

== Dungeons & Dragons 3rd/3.5 Edition ==
Title	Author(s)	Year	ISBN	Notes
Sourcebooks
Dragonlance Campaign Setting	Margaret Weis, Don Perrin, Jamie Chambers, Christopher Coyle	2003	0-7869-3086-1	
Bestiary of Krynn	Cam Banks, André La Roche	2004	978-1-931567-29-9	
Bestiary of Krynn, Revised	Cam Banks, Andre La Roche	2007	1-9315-6729-8	
Setting books
Age of Mortals	Margaret Weis, Jamie Chambers, Christopher Coyle	2003	978-1931567107	
War of the Lance	Margaret Weis, Tracy Hickman, Jamie Chambers	2004	978-1560764311	
Legends of the Twins	Margaret Weis, Tracy Hickman, Chris Pierson, Seth Johnson and Aaron Rosenbeig	2005	978-1931567312	
Topic books
Towers of High Sorcery	Margaret Weis, Chris Pierson, Jamie Chambers	2004	978-1931567176	Splatbook with a focus on wizards which includes prestige classes, magic items, and spells. Also includes the mechanics for The Test, "the method by which a magic-user can become a wizard of high sorcery".
Holy Orders of the Stars	Sean Everette, Chris Pierson, Cam Banks, Trampas Whiteman	2005	978-1931567152	Splatbook with a focus on clerics which includes a major update to the gods of Dragonlance. The gods of this setting differ greatly from the information on gods outlined in Deities & Demigods (2002).
Knightly Orders of Ansalon	Sean Everette, Nicole Harsch, Clark Valentine, Trampas Whiteman	2006	978-1931567374	Splatbook with a focus on three knightly organizations: the Knights of Solamnia, the Dark Knights, and the Legion of Steel.
Races of Ansalon	Cam Banks, Sean Macdonald, Clark Valentine, Trampas Whiteman	2007	978-1931567350	Splatbook with a focus on the major races of Dragonlance: Dwarves, Elves, Gnomes, Goblins, Humans, Kender, Minotaurs and Ogres.
Dragons of Krynn	Cam Banks, Sean Everette, Amanda Valentine	2007	978-1931567275	Splatbook with a focus on dragons; collates "all of Dragonlance's dragon background into" one sourcebook.
Age of Mortals Campaign
Key of Destiny	Christopher Coyle	2004	1-931567-11-5	
Spectre of Sorrows	Cam Banks	2005	1-931567-16-6	
Price of Courage	Cam Banks	2006	1-931567-21-2	
War of the Lance Chronicles
Dragons of Autumn			978-1931567336	
Dragons of Winter	Jeff Grubb, Tracy Hickman, Laura Hickman, Douglas Niles, Michael Dobson, Cam Banks, Sean Macdonald	2007	978-1931567367	
Dragons of Spring	Jeff Grubb, Tracy Hickman, Laura Hickman, Douglas Niles, Sean Macdonald, Clive Squire, Heine Stick	2008	978-1931567381	
Tasslehoff's Map Pouches
Tasslehoff's Map Pouch: The Age of Mortals	Sean Macdonald	2005	978-1931567329	Accessory with a cartographic focus. Included maps of numerous Dragonlance locations.
Tasslehoff's Map Pouch: The War of the Lance	Sean Macdonald	2006	978-1931567343	Accessory with a cartographic focus. Included maps of numerous Dragonlance locations.
Tasslehoff's Map Pouch: Legends	Sean Macdonald	2006	978-1931567770	Accessory with a cartographic focus. Included maps of numerous Dragonlance locations.

== Dungeons & Dragons 5th Edition ==
Title	Author(s)	Date	ISBN	Notes
Unearthed Arcana
2022: Heroes of Krynn	Ben Petrisor, F. Wesley Schneider, Jeremy Crawford	March 8, 2022	—N/a	Public playtest PDF
2022: Heroes of Krynn Revisited	Ben Petrisor, F. Wesley Schneider, Jeremy Crawford	April 25, 2022	—N/a	Public playtest PDF
Adventure module
Dragonlance: Shadow of the Dragon Queen	F. Wesley Schneider (Project Lead), Justice Arman, Brian Cortijo, Kelly Digges, Dan Dillon, Ari Levitch, Renee Knipe, Ben Petrisor, Mario Ortegon, Erin Roberts, James L. Sutter	December 6, 2022	978-0-7869-6828-2	Module which corresponds with the Warriors of Krynn board game.
Board game
Dragonlance: Warriors of Krynn	Stephen Baker, Rob Daviau	December 6, 2022	—N/a	A wargame game which resolves battles from the Shadow of the Dragon Queen narrative.

== See also ==
- List of Dungeons & Dragons modules
- Dragons of Light (anthology by Orson Scott Card)
