= Dragons of Mystery =

Role-playing game module

- The cover of the module, with art by Larry Elmore.
- Code: DL5
- TSR product code: 9135
- Rules required: AD&D (1st Edition)
- Character levels: NA
- Campaign setting: Dragonlance
- Authors: Michael Dobson
- First published: 1984

Linked modules
- DL1, DL2, DL3, DL4, DL5, DL6, DL7, DL8, DL9, DL10, DL11, DL12, DL13, DL14, DL15, DL16

Dragons of Mystery is a Dungeons & Dragons sourcebook published in 1984 as part of a series of modules for the Dragonlance (DL) campaign setting. It is the fifth of fourteen Dragonlance modules published by TSR between 1984 and 1986. Its cover features a painting by Larry Elmore of the characters Tanis Half-Elven, Laurana Kanan, Tasslehoff Burrfoot, and Tika Waylan standing in front of a dragon highlord and a blue dragon. The sourcebook received middling reviews from White Dwarf magazine.

== Contents ==
Dragons of Mystery is a sourcebook for the world of Krynn and the characters in the Dragonlance series. The book presents the geography, myths surrounding creation, and deities of Krynn, including articles on each of the heroes which detail how they met and provides background information on the characters. The package also contains an errata sheet for the first four modules in the series.

=== Sections ===
The module consists of several sections and two maps. The first section is a brief introduction, and the final section is a marketing questionnaire about the Dragonlance series.

"A Dungeonmaster’s Guide to the Dragonlance game adventures" includes a history of Dragonlance, a suggested session breakdown for running modules DL1–DL4, and errata for DL1–DL4. It also contains extra information on the dragons of Krynn, the dwarves of Thorbardin, the Council of Freedom and several non-player characters: Verminaard, Fizban, Sestun, Fewmaster Toede and Fistandantilus.

"The Companions of the Lance" is a page-long presentation of game statistics, history, and personality of each of the heroes as they first appear in the series. This allows for a longer, more detailed presentation of the information than appeared in the adventure modules. The heroes presented are Tanis, Caramon, Raistlin, Flint Fireforge, Tasslehoff Burrfoot, Sturm Brightblade, Goldmoon, Riverwind, Tika Waylan, Gilthanas, Laurana, and Elistan.

The other sections are titled "The Creation of the World", "The Gods of Krynn", and "How The Heroes Met".

The map "The Constellations of Krynn" is found on the inside cover in a star chart that shows planets, moons, major stars, and constellations with their symbols superimposed. The map "The Continent of Ansalon" is a fold-out insert with 20-mile hexagonal tiles.

== Publication history ==
DL5 Dragons of Mystery was written by Michael Dobson, with art by Larry Elmore, and was published by TSR in 1984 as a 32-page booklet with an outer folder.

== Reception ==
Alan Mynard reviewed DL5 in Imagine magazine, giving it a balanced but overall positive review. He described the contents, noting that the large color map is of no use to anyone running the modules DL1-4. Mynard praised the section of background info (How the Heroes Met) as "welcome news" for gamemasters who are often asked about this type of material by the players. He also liked the detailed information on the player characters (The Companions of the Lance), but noted that his players complained that it would have been useful having access to it from the beginning of the campaign. Mynard described DL5 as being a "good attempt to bring together" previously published (and some new) information and as being written in a "clear, concise style". However, he wondered why it had only been published so late in the series—he felt the content should have been included in DL1. In summary, Mynard found DL5 "in no way essential", but nevertheless recommended it for anyone running the DL series of modules or thinking of doing so.

Graham Staplehurst reviewed Dragons of Mystery for White Dwarf, and gave it 6 of 10 overall. He wrote that "To some extent, players will have been so overwhelmed with background information in the Dragonlance modules that the style of the setting and adventures will be as familiar as any campaign world can be." Staplehurst said that Dragons of Mystery was produced essentially as a sourcebook for Krynn, because "TSR obviously feel that both DMs and players would appreciate yet more background to the world of Krynn and perhaps some hints of the adventures still in the pipeline and yet to be produced". According to Staplehurst, its actual use and value as a sourcebook was questionable, as much of the information in the book was repeated to a greater extent from the prior four modules, and that "the ten or so pages of new material was insubstantial and too shallow to be of practical use". Staplehurst stated that "Various points hinted at in the modules are not expanded here and the only really interesting notes are those on the Dragons of Krynn: the designer's note in the introduction that the project is seen to some extent as a 'showcase' for the twelve varieties of dragon ... and the extra details are welcome." Staplehurst concluded the review by stating, "Overall, there is plenty of information contained within the modules themselves for DMs, and I would not recommend the sourcebook even for the continental map-this is going to be little use to the players except for papering a spare wall."
