= Dragons of Hope =

Role-playing game adventure

- The cover of the module, with art by Keith Parkinson, showing a Dragon Highlord riding a red dragon that is attacking a brass dragon.
- Code: DL3
- TSR product code: 9131
- Rules required: AD&D (1st Edition)
- Character levels: 6 - 8
- Campaign setting: Dragonlance
- Authors: Tracy Hickman
- First published: 1984

Linked modules
- DL1, DL2, DL3, DL4, DL5, DL6, DL7, DL8, DL9, DL10, DL11, DL12, DL13, DL14, DL15, DL16

Dragons of Hope is an adventure in the Dungeons & Dragons fantasy role-playing game. It is the third module of the 14 Dragonlance adventures published by TSR, Inc., between 1984 and 1986. The module is intended for level 6-8 player characters.

The events of this module were not covered in the original Dragonlance Chronicles but are detailed in the novel Dragons of the Dwarven Depths by Margaret Weis and Tracy Hickman.

== Plot synopsis ==
Dragons of Hope is an adventure in which the objective for the player characters (PC) is to help the released prisoners from Pax Tharkas evade an army of draconians and then to assist them in finding the city of Thorbardin, the ancient home of the mountain dwarves. To do so, the characters must first find the key to Thorbardin, which is hidden within the lair that was home to a wizard long ago.

The adventure starts with the players freeing 800 refugees from Pax Tharkas, who are subsequently pursued through the wilderness by Verminaard's army. The players must then lead their characters through the snow-capped Kharolis Mountains, across the Dergoth plains towards Skullcap, and ultimately to Thorbardin.

The module contains special rules and challenges in each particular region in order for the PCs to successfully reach their goal of leading the refugees to safety. Bonus experience points are available to players depending on how many refugees they manage to lead to safety.

== Publication history ==
DL3 Dragons of Hope was written by Tracy Hickman, with a cover by Keith Parkinson and interior illustrations by Parkinson and Larry Elmore. It was published by TSR in 1984 as a 32-page booklet with an outer folder and a large two-color map. The module comes with a large map for the players and a smaller version of the map for the DM, as well as two detailed maps of specific areas.

== Reception ==
Alan Mynard reviewed DL3 together with DL4 in Imagine magazine, giving it a positive review overall. He praised the "excellent layout" and the "clarity of detail". According to Mynard, the module provides numerous encounters along an overland trek that work very well and allows the players considerable freedom. Overall, he felt that DL3 would not work very well on its own, but could work quite well combined with DL4, assuming the gamemaster is prepared to do plenty of work. Mynard saw only one major flaw in DL3, namely that it assumes the players gather sufficient information to start DL4, but this is not provided by the module and it is up to the gamemaster to invent it. In conclusion, Mynard noted: "As part of the Dragonlance series...it's like a television soap opera, once you've started you just can't stop."

Graham Staplehurst reviewed Dragons of Hope for White Dwarf, and gave it an 8/10 grade overall. He considered this module an improvement in the design over Dragons of Flame, and enjoyed it more. He felt that this module had a lot more for players to contend with when compared to Dragons of Flame. He disliked how "much of the action turns on uncontrollable plot devices, with many poorly explained or of dubious value as contributions to the game", as well as "the rather ambiguous detailed area maps and events that were somewhat coerced and did not flow naturally from play". However, he considered that there were very few such "bugs" and noted that DMs can of course leave out anything anomalous, and concluded by stating how he: "liked the free-ranging nature of the scenario rather than the usual confinement of dungeon pathways".

== Adaptations ==
The Shadow Sorcerer personal computer game is based on this module. It is very different from the official games based on earlier modules in the series, and is one of the earliest real-time strategy games. This module has also been converted into the Neverwinter Nights format, requiring both the Shadows of Undrentide and Hordes of the Underdark expansion packs as well as the original game.
