= Dragons of Desolation =

1984 book by Tracy Hickman

- The cover of the module, with art by Keith Parkinson, showing Derkin's (or Duncan's) Tomb.
- Code: DL4
- TSR product code: 9139
- Rules required: AD&D (1st Edition)
- Character levels: 6–8
- Campaign setting: Dragonlance
- Authors: Tracy Hickman; Michael Dobson
- First published: 1984

Linked modules
- DL1, DL2, DL3, DL4, DL5, DL6, DL7, DL8, DL9, DL10, DL11, DL12, DL13, DL14, DL15, DL16

Dragons of Desolation is the fourth and final module in the first major story arc in the Dungeons & Dragons Dragonlance series of game modules. It is one of the fourteen Dragonlance adventures published by TSR between 1984 and 1986. The module is intended for player characters of level 6–8.

The events of this module were not covered in the original Dragonlance Chronicles but are told in the novel Dragons of the Dwarven Depths by Margaret Weis and Tracy Hickman.

== Plot synopsis ==
Dragons of Desolation is an adventure in which the players use pregenerated characters that conform to the list of characters in the Dragonlance Chronicles. The heroes have discovered the underground kingdom of Thorbardin, where the dwarves are already contending with forces of the draconians. The characters must find the legendary Hammer of Kharas in a floating castle to obtain aid from the dwarves. The module details the realm of Thorbardin, which is mapped out on reusable modular sections.

In this module, the dragon armies have conquered the North. The PCs must lead a band of refugees to the Doors of Thorbardin and convince the dwarves to let them pass by meeting their price. All of this must be done before the draconians find the hidden camp used by the refugees and destroy it.

Chapter 14: The Doors of Thorbardin

Chapter 14 is event-based with a small wilderness trip. Elistan appears dead, the PCs have strange dreams, and there is a possible conversation with Verminaard. The chapter concludes with the discovery of the Doors of Thorbardin.

Chapter 15: The North Gate of the Dwarves
This chapter occurs in a vast, but very sparsely populated, dungeon that leads into a vast underground dwarven realm. The PCs encounter the dwarf Arman Kharas, who is searching for his kidnapped half-brother Pick, but should avoid the Derro city.

Chapter 16: The Honor of the Hylar
Eventually the PCs will come or be brought to the Life-Tree of the Hylar, a massive half mile high stalagmite with a dwarven city carved into it that rises out of the middle of an underground lake. There they have an audience with the Council of the Thanes, who agree to allow the PCs to go, and the refugees to pass through, if the heroes recover the Hammer of Kharas. Eben Shatterstone is kept as a hostage by the dwarves, but Arman Kharas travels with the party on their quest to recover the hammer.

Chapter 17: Kalil S'rith
Kalil S'rith (Dwarven for "The Valley of Thanes") is a valley enclosed by high mountains where the Dwarves bury their dead. There the PCs find the Derkin's tomb floating above a lake. The Gold Dragon Evenstar guards the Hammer of Kharas ensconced in the tomb. After a confrontation with Ember, which ends with the death of both Ember and Evenstar, the heroes escape on magical horses as the tomb begins to sink (this is the image shown on the module's cover).

Chapter 18: Dark Realms
With the dragon armies in pursuit, the Heroes are either chased or captured and taken to the climactic encounter of the First Book for the Dragonlance saga. In the Temple of Stars, the heroes confront Verminaard, the traitor is revealed, and they fight the final battle.

Epilogue
With Verminaard dead, and the Hammer of Kharas recovered, the heroes have secured a safe passage for the refugees. If they have not done so in time, few survive. The Wedding of Goldmoon and Riverwind completes the story as the heroes consider what needs to be done next.

== Publication history ==
DL4 Dragons of Desolation was written by Tracy Hickman and Michael Dobson with Harold Johnson and Bruce Nesmith. The cover art was painted by Keith Parkinson and interior illustrations were drawn by Larry Elmore and Jeff Butler. It was published by TSR in 1984 as a 32-page booklet with an outer folder and a large map. Its cover shows the heroes riding away from the floating tomb of Derkin. There is a tiny TARDIS, as well as Doctor Who, and even K-9 hidden in the painting.

== Reception ==
In Issue 32 of Abyss, Dave Nalle was disappointed in this module, writing, "The more I see of this series, the less the surface trappings fool me." Nalle thought the flying castle was "well done", but noted "a flying dungeon is just a flying dungeon." Nalle pointed out that the random monsters "seem totally illogical and out of place." Nalle also disliked the idea of pregenerated characters, pointing out, "You no longer have to think, TSR provides the characters for you."

Writing for the British RPG magazine Imagine, Alan Mynard criticized the part covering the cities of the Dwarven kingdom of Thorbadin as he felt the descriptive texts were vague, leaving plenty of work for the gamemaster to come up with the details. He felt that the same criticism applied to the dungeon part of the module. Mynard also felt that very few decisions were left to the players in this scenario and "even the final big battle is carefully scripted". Despite this, Mynard concluded, "As part of the Dragonlance series...it's like a television soap opera, once you've started you just can't stop."

In the British game magazine White Dwarf, Graham Staplehurst called the module "perhaps one of the most innovative scenarios that TSR have recently produced", although he opined that TSR UK had been a lot more forward-thinking in their ideas at the time than TSR itself. He suggested that the DM would have a lot to keep track of with this module, making it very taxing to run. However, he felt that the scenario was rewarding if well-run, "with some very interesting encounters and a mapping system that I'm sure I'll want to use elsewhere". Staplehurst was impressed with the module's design, and noted that the scenario had the most actual text of the first four modules in the series. Staplehurst concluded by giving it a rating of 9/10 overall, writing, "It is a shame that players could not have developed their own characters for the quest, but those provided by now will be familiar enough."

In his 1991 book Heroic Worlds, Lawrence Schick calls this adventure "A dramatic scenario."

== Adaptations ==
The Shadow Sorcerer personal computer game is based on this module and DL3 Dragons of Hope. Very different from the official games based on earlier modules in the series, it is one of the earliest real-time strategy games.
