= Dragons of Ice =

1985 book by Douglas Niles

- The cover of Dragons of Ice, with art by Larry Elmore. The artwork depicts Laurana on board of an Ice Boat as it is attacked by Sleet, a white dragon.
- Code: DL6
- TSR product code: 9140
- Rules required: AD&D (1st Edition)
- Character levels: 6–9
- Campaign setting: Dragonlance
- Authors: Douglas Niles
- First published: 1985

Linked modules
- DL1, DL2, DL3, DL4, DL5, DL6, DL7, DL8, DL9, DL10, DL11, DL12, DL13, DL14, DL15, DL16

Dragons of Ice is the start of the second major story arc in the Dungeons & Dragons Dragonlance series of game modules. It is one of the 14 DL modules published by TSR between 1984 and 1986. Its cover features a painting of a white dragon attacking sail powered ice boats by Larry Elmore. The module launches players into the story of the second book of the Dragonlance Chronicles, Dragons of Winter Night.

== Plot summary ==
Dragons of Ice is an adventure in which the player characters left Thorbardin and go south to the polar regions, traveling along the glaciers to find Icewall Castle. The characters encounter creatures including the Ice Folk, boats that skate on ice, and the Walrus-Men.

Characters begin play at the ancient port city of Tarsis in the world of Krynn. After an attack by the Dragonarmies on Tarsis, the party is driven south to Icewall Castle, which is home to a white dragon and one of the legendary Dragon Orbs.

After the Cataclysm, the seas receded from the port city Tarsis, so instead of finding a port the characters have found a land locked city 40 miles (64 km) inland. The adventure series version of Dragons of Winter Night, book two of the Dragonlance saga, will follow part of the party from the first book, Dragons of Autumn Twilight. Returning playable characters available are Sturm Brightblade, Flint Fireforge and Tasslehoff Burrfoot and Gilthanas. Laurana and Elistan, previously appearing NPC's, are now also playable as characters. Additionally two Knights of Solamnia, Aaron Tallbow and Derek Crownguard, are available for players if required. Aaron will appear as an NPC with the party if he is not used by a player. The other characters from the first book leave from Tarsis in a different direction at the beginning of DL10 Dragons of Dreams.

=== Chapters ===
Chapter 1: The Fall of Tarsis

Chapter 2: The Ice Reaches

Chapter 3: The Ice Folk

Chapter 4: Icewall Castle

Chapter 5: Icemountain Bay

Epilogue

== Publication history ==
DL6 Dragons of Ice was written by Douglas Niles, with a cover by Larry Elmore and interior illustrations by Diana Magnuson, and was published by TSR in 1985 as a 32-page booklet with a color map and an outer folder.

== Reception ==
Alan Mynard reviewed the module for Imagine magazine, giving it a positive review. He noted that some of the player characters from DL1-4 play no part in this module, as the story splits into two sub-plots after DL4, Dragons of Desolation. Mynard wrote that this adds some freshness to the series, as new player characters become available. According to him, this module has something for everyone, offering town, wilderness and castle/dungeon settings. Mynard liked the town part best, as it leaves much discretion to the gamemaster on how to make use of it. He praised the excellent wilderness map, but noted that this part of the adventure offers only limited player choice. To Mynard's taste, the castle section is "too brief and lacking in any real challenges". However, his only criticism regarded the lack of a proper ending to the module. According to him, there is no real ending, as the players are launched directly into DL7. Mynard called DL6 "well worth playing", but advised waiting until play can continue straight into DL7.

According to Jesse Willis for the website SFFaudio, this module features devices similar to the sails and roller ships featured in Philip José Farmer's The Green Odyssey.
