= Dragonlance Classics 15th Anniversary Edition =

Role-playing adventure

Dragonlance Classics 15th Anniversary Edition is a 1999 role-playing game supplement published by TSR for Advanced Dungeons & Dragons that recalls the Dragonlance series of adventures and novels published fifteen years before, and also celebrates the 25th anniversary of D&D itself.

== Plot summary ==
Dragonlance Classics 15th Anniversary Edition is a rewrite of the original DL series of adventures including all-new scenes. In the words of TSR, the product is "a retelling of the greatest fantasy role-playing epic ever." The adventures described within are a blend of the original Dragonlance adventures and the trilogy of Dragonlance novels — Dragons of Autumn Twilight, Dragons of Winter Night, and Dragons of Spring Dawning — that were published in conjunction with the original adventures. The adventures are written using the rules for both AD&D and the SAGA System that TSR briefly used before the introduction of the 3rd edition of D&D.

== Publication history ==
To celebrate the 25th anniversary of D&D, TSR released several supplements in 1999 to update some of the most popular of TSR's Dungeons & Dragons adventures, including Against the Giants: The Liberation of Geoff (1999), Dragonlance Classics 15th Anniversary Edition (1999), Ravenloft (1999), Return to the Keep on the Borderlands (1999) and Return to White Plume Mountain (1999).

Dragonlance Classics: 15th Anniversary Edition was published in May 1999.

== Reception ==
Writing for Inquest Gamer, Dan Joyce was pleased that TSR was "moving away from the complex floorplans of its wargaming roots and becoming more story-driven." He also liked the blend of "dungeon crawls, urban adventures, travel, intrigue, war... even love." However, Joyce noted that because the adventures followed the plots of the novels and original adventures, "it railroads the game somewhat" and compared the result to the linear storyline of a Fighting Fantasy book. Joyce concluded by giving the product a grade of "B-", saying, "As a campaign for gamemasters and players who know next to nothing about the original Dragonlance trilogy, this could be fantastic, because it'll be all new and the linear nature of the campaign could be concealed with some clever GM chicanery."

In Issue 121 of Casus Belli Frédéric Ménage noted approvingly that "The plot has been completed by new episodes, which fill in some original narrative cracks, and the descriptions of the characters played or not played are more detailed, the psychological tensions better underlined." Ménage concluded with an enthusiastic recommendation, saying, "If you could only play one role-playing campaign in your life, this is it: it imposes itself by its epic breath and the richness of its character."
