= Dragons of Glory =

Book by Michael Dobson

- Tasslehoff Burrfoot fighting a Draconian.
- Code: DL11
- Rules required: AD&D (1st Edition)
- Character levels: NA
- Campaign setting: Dragonlance
- Authors: Douglas Niles and Tracy Hickman
- First published: 1985

Linked modules
- DL1, DL2, DL3, DL4, DL5, DL6, DL7, DL8, DL9, DL10, DL11, DL12, DL13, DL14, DL15, DL16

Dragons of Glory is a Dungeons & Dragons source book in a series of modules from the Dragonlance campaign setting. It is one of the 16 DL modules published by TSR between 1984 and 1986.

This module is "a complete and self-contained simulation game" centered on the War of the Lance. While other modules focus on the journeys of characters such as Tanis Half-Elven, this module allows the dungeon master (DM) to recreate larger battles. Characters can control the forces of the High Solamnic Knights or their enemies, the Dragon Highlords. The module can be played with the Battlesystem rules, but is designed to be run as a standalone wargame. Advanced rules are available in Dragon Magazine #107.

== Contents ==
The Dragons of Glory pack consists of: a stiff, double cardboard cover with tables and text on the inside so that they can be used during the game, a large two-sectioned map displaying the continent of Ansalon and the islands which surround it, 400 die-cut counters with a resealable plastic bag in which to store them, an eight-page rule booklet, and a 16-page campaign and scenario booklet.

Dragons of Glory is a self-contained wargame adapted from the Dragonlance novel series published by TSR. The Whitestone forces oppose the evil Dragon Highlords in their attempt to take over the world of Krynn. Both sides have the opportunity to recruit from the many neutral countries, to grow their armies further. Players will also be able to improve their armies by adding magic items, wizards, dragons, and leaders. The game includes a combat results table which uses a ten-sided die rather than the standard six-sided die, and many different modifiers can achieve results on a die roll with a range of -5 to 16.

== Plot summary ==
Dragons of Glory is both a sourcebook and a strategic-level war-based board game. The game is set during a war between two factions: the draconians and the forces defending Krynn. The set gives details of the overall war and provides Battlesystem game statistics for the two opposing armies.

Dragons of Glory is a simulation game, designed to allow players to produce their own timeline of historical events for the world of Krynn for an ongoing Dragonlance campaign. By keeping track of the positions of both forces over time, news can be related to the player characters, who can encounter some of the armies, creatures, or leaders during appropriate times.

== Publication history ==
DL11 Dragons of Glory was written by Douglas Niles and Tracy Hickman, with cover art by Jeff Easley and interior illustrations by Diana Magnuson and Jeff Butler. It was published by TSR in 1986 as a sixteen-page pamphlet, an eight-page pamphlet, two large color maps, a cardboard counter sheet, a small zip-locked bag, and a double-thick outer folder.

Niles and Hickman revealed in Dragon No. 107 (March 1986) that in the product, some details affecting combat were dispensed with for ease of play. The article in Dragon provided advanced and optional rules for the Dragons of Glory simulation game, some of which complement the standard rules, while others replace some of them. Three new scenarios were also included in the article.

== Reception ==
Graham Staplehurst reviewed Dragons of Glory for White Dwarf No. 78. He said that the game "isn't brilliant", calling the rulebook "rather unhelpful", and feeling that TSR (having purchased SPI) "could have put this together rather better". He felt that the explanation for the counters was poor, noting the absence of a key to identify which color represented which nation. He also noted that the game required multiple types of dice, making game mechanics unnecessarily messy. He considered the rules "very simple", saying that "anyone who has played a simulation game before should find them easy in the extreme to pick up, though there are unclear points, which is again unnecessary in a game this simple", citing the example rules of retreating before combat and the "moving capital" rule. He noted that with the latter rule all a player is required to do to win an offered scenario is to "disband" their capital. Staplehurst felt that although the retreating rule was a sensible option, it left the potential responses available for the attacker unclear. He said that the game "didn't appeal to me as a simulation gamer", and that compared with "excellent fantasy games" such as White Bear and Red Moon and SPI's War of the Ring, Dragons of Glory seemed "to have been rather hastily put together and the rules and charts could have been much better organized". Staplehurst also believed that while the option of using the simulation to provide a unique historical background and context for a Dragonlance campaign sounded fine, this would require a large amount of bookkeeping and a very dedicated DM to manage. He also opined that with ten modules already released in the series, most players had already started their campaigns. He concluded his review by stating: "Overall, I hesitate to recommend this game to anyone but the Dragonlance fanatic who has had some experience of simulation games. It's not a very good introduction for the novice[...] and is not a particularly enjoyable [sic] to the shelves of a simulation wargamer".

Doug Traversa reviewed the adventure in Space Gamer/Fantasy Gamer No. 80. He notes that "despite its module format, this is not another AD&D adventure, but a separate self-contained wargame". Traversa commented that "on first inspection, the game appears to be a real winner. The counters are beautiful, the maps are done in water color, which gives them an aged appearance. The rules are easy to read, and many of the mechanics are right out of TSR's old Divine Right game". After noting the lower-than-usual price, he commented that "unfortunately, the old adage, 'You get what you pay for', seems to apply here. The rules are shoddy, full of unanswered questions, and the scenario booklet if full of errors. After playing one basic scenario and two campaign games, we came up with over twenty serious rules omissions and found several errors in the set-up instructions for scenario 2". Traversa concluded his review by saying that "it would not be desirable to list all the problems with this game; but rest assured, there are enough to give players a real headache. I sent a list of our questions to TSR, and until I get a reply, Dragons of Glory will sit on my shelf. Playing it is not worth the effort. Until a comprehensive errata sheet comes out, avoid this game. If one does come out, Dragons of Glory could go from being the dog of the year to being a very enjoyable game".

== Reviews ==
- Casus Belli
