= Dragons of Despair =

1984 book by Tracy Hickman

- The cover of Dragons of Despair, with art by Clyde Caldwell. The artwork depicts a group of adventurers confronting a dragon.
- Code: DL1
- TSR product code: 9130
- Rules required: AD&D (1st Edition)
- Character levels: 4–6
- Campaign setting: Dragonlance
- Authors: Tracy Hickman
- First published: 1984
- Pages: 32
- ISBN: 0-88038-086-1

Linked modules
- DL1, DL2, DL3, DL4, DL5, DL6, DL7, DL8, DL9, DL10, DL11, DL12, DL13, DL14, DL15, DL16

Dragons of Despair is the first in a series of 16 Dragonlance adventures published by TSR, Inc. (TSR) between 1984 and 1988. It is the start of the first major story arc in the Dragonlance series of Dungeons & Dragons (D&D) role-playing game modules, a series of ready-to-play adventures for use by Dungeon Masters in the game. This series provides a game version of the original Dragonlance storyline later told in the Dragonlance Chronicles trilogy of novels. This module corresponds to the events told in the first half of the novel Dragons of Autumn Twilight by Margaret Weis and Tracy Hickman. Its module code is DL1, which is used to designate it as the first part of the Dragonlance adventure series.

== Plot summary ==
As with most D&D adventures, the exact storyline varies based on the actions that the game's players choose for their player characters (PCs), although a general course of action is assumed by the adventure. The story begins with the PCs meeting up in the settlement of Solace after five years of unsuccessful individual quests to find any sign of "true clerics". A series of wilderness encounters are used to direct the PCs to find the Blue Crystal Staff and take it to the ancient ruined city of Xak Tsaroth.

In the jungle-covered subterranean ruins of Xak Tsaroth the player characters search for knowledge of the ancient gods of good, and first encounter the invading draconians. They also find baby dragons and encounter Khisanth, an ancient black dragon. The PCs follow the fleeing dragon down a well, where they must negotiate the first level of a dungeon typical of Dungeons & Dragons adventures, filled with draconians, gully dwarf slaves, and other monsters.

On the second level of the dungeon, the PCs must confront and defeat Khisanth. This is an extremely challenging task for the party, but if they have her Blue Crystal Staff, they will be aided by the goddess Mishakal. The adventure ends with the PCs recovering the Disks of Mishakal, allowing for the return of true clerics to Krynn for the first time in over 300 years.

== Publication history ==
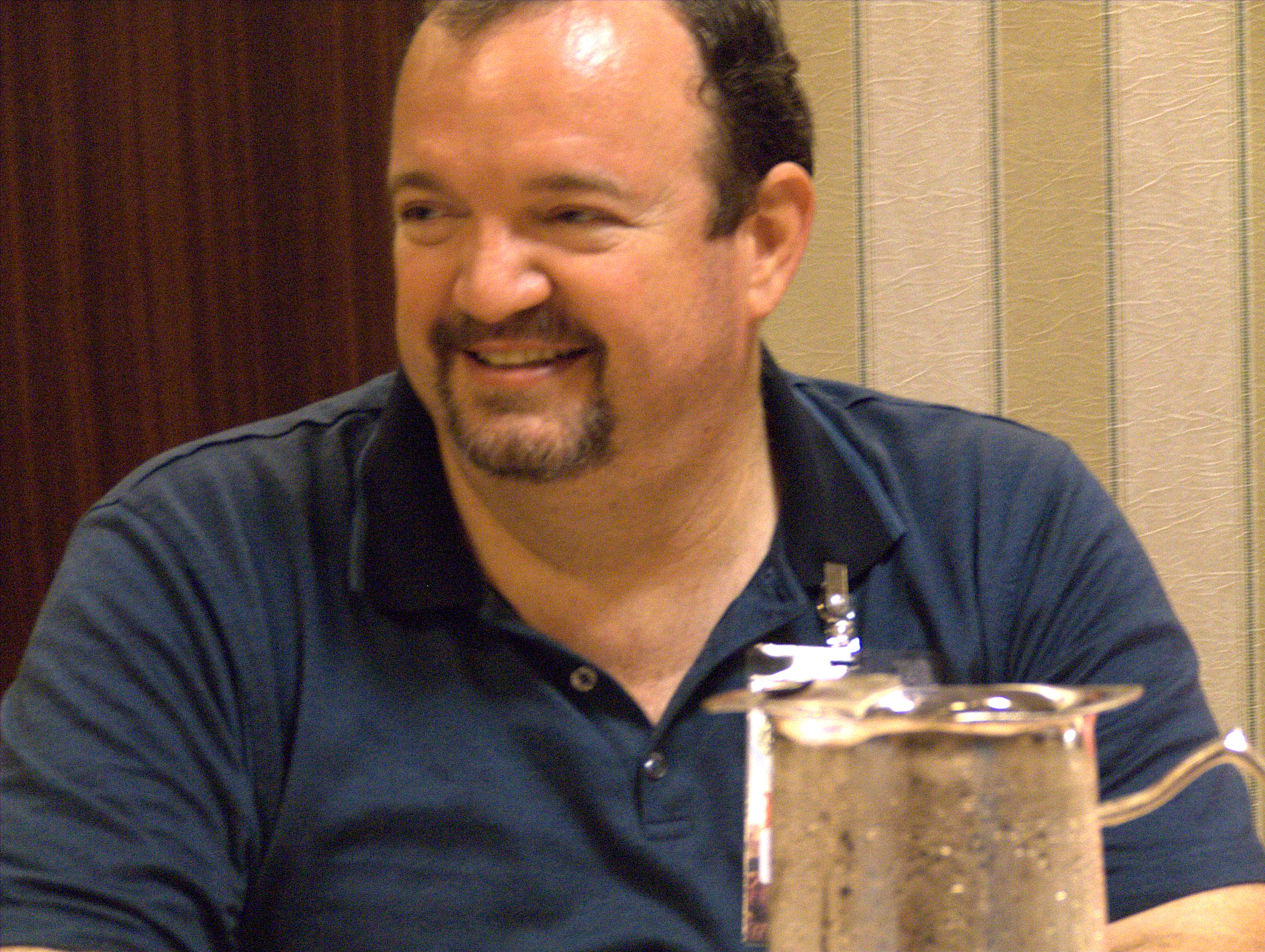
The adventure was designed by Tracy Hickman (pictured in 2006).

This module was first published in March 1984, seven months before the first Dragonlance novel, and is the first Dragonlance product released. In January and February, there were small teaser advertisements—each less than a quarter page—in Dragon magazine, simply showing the Dragonlance logo and the text "coming soon". A full-page ad was featured in Dragon in April 1984.

The scenario is the first adventure in an epic series which takes place on the world of Krynn. The March 1984 issue of Dragon contained a short story titled "The Test of the Twins" by Margaret Weis, along with a sidebar describing Dragonlance as "an epic adventure usable with the AD&D game system, and will be detailed through a series of TSR products – books, games, modules, and even miniature figures." In the same issue a full-page teaser advertisement showed a black-and-white version of the painting from the cover of Dragons of Despair with the text "Play the epic series... Advanced Dungeons & Dragons Dragonlance".

The module consisted of a 32-page book with an outer folder. The cover of Dragons of Despair features a painting by Clyde Caldwell depicting the black dragon Khisanth fighting three heroes—Goldmoon, Tanis Half-Elven, and Caramon Majere—from the books upon which the adventure is based. This module features the first appearance of Draconians and Aghar (Gully Dwarves) in the game, and new locations such as Xak Tsaroth, Solace and Haven. It is the first appearance of the pre-generated player characters (PCs) that form the Heroes of the Lance group of characters–Tanis Half-Elven, Sturm Brightblade, Caramon Majere, Raistlin Majere, Flint Fireforge, Tasslehoff Burrfoot and Goldmoon. Riverwind is played as a non-player character (NPC) by the Dungeon Master. Tika Waylan makes her first appearance as an NPC; she is available for use as a PC and joins up with the Heroes of the Lance in Chapter 7 of Dragons of Flame. The villainous hobgoblin lord Fewmaster Toede also makes his first appearance.

The original concept of the module was done by Tracy Hickman, who "designed a world and an heroic adventure to go with it". The module was edited by Michael Williams. The module's design staff included Tracy Hickman, Harold Johnson, Douglas Niles, Carl Smith, and Michael Williams. The module features cover art by Clyde Caldwell and interior artwork by Jeff Easley.

=== Reprints and revisions ===
The original series was updated to Advanced Dungeons & Dragons second edition and repackaged as the three Dragonlance Classics modules, using module code DLC. DLC1 Dragonlance Classics Volume 1 reprinted Dragons of Despair, along with Dragons of Flame, Dragons of Hope, and Dragons of Desolation, in 1990.

In 1999, Wizards of the Coast published a new revision of the original Dragonlance story, including Dragons of Despair, in Dragonlance Classics: 15th Anniversary Edition as part of their TSR's Silver Anniversary line. In 2000, the entire DL module series was reprinted exactly as the originals but in a smaller size. This printing was available as two slip case sets, with Dragons of Despair included in Dragonlance Volume 1: DL1 – DL8. The four chapters of Dragons of Autumn, an updated version of some Dragonlance modules converting them to Dungeons & Dragons version 3.5, corresponds to the material in Dragons of Despair.

Advanced Dungeons & Dragons: Heroes of the Lance is a video game based on Dragons of Despair released in 1988. It is a horizontally scrolling fighting game that represents the events of the module. Dragons of Despair has also been converted into the Neverwinter Nights computer game format. The adaptation requires both the Shadows of Undrentide and Hordes of the Underdark expansion packs as well as the original game.

== Reception ==
Steve Hampshire reviewed the scenario for Imagine magazine. He "enjoyed this module a lot" and felt it was "well-detailed and original, and plays well". Hampshire found it "good value", his only problem having been reading "the rather flowery prose without being laughed down by the players".

A review by Graham Staplehurst in White Dwarf magazine, issue #60, gave the module an 8 out of 10 overall, and noted that the lack of things such as gold and clerics in the adventure world "don't destroy the feel of the scenario, whilst creating a very novel atmosphere". Staplehurst felt that the adventure was "...very much taken off from Lord of the Rings with a powerful magic item to be taken at all costs to the aggressor's innermost defences and through them. The characters will have to get past a nice new race of humanoids as well as a couple of other monster-concepts. The artwork (aside from the cover) is good and usable in the adventure. Another good product."

In his 1991 book Heroic Worlds, Lawrence Schick described the scenarios as "heavy-handed in channelling the players to follow the plot". It placed 25th on a 2004 list of "The 30 Greatest D&D adventures of All Time", the only Dragonlance module to make the list.
