= Dragons of Flame =

Dragons of Flame is the name of:

- Dragons of Flame (module), second module in the Dungeons & Dragons Dragonlance series
- Dragons of Flame (video game), sequel to Advanced Dungeons and Dragons: Heroes of the Lance based on the game module
