= Dragons of Flame (module) =

- The cover of the module, painted by Jeff Easley, showing Tasslehoff Burrfoot, Verminaard and the Red Dragon Ember.
- Code: DL2
- TSR product code: 9132
- Rules required: AD&D (1st Edition)
- Character levels: 5 - 7
- Campaign setting: Dragonlance
- Authors: Douglas Niles
- First published: 1984
- Pages: 32

Linked modules
- DL1, DL2, DL3, DL4, DL5, DL6, DL7, DL8, DL9, DL10, DL11, DL12, DL13, DL14, DL15, DL16

Dragons of Flame is the second module in the first major story arc in the Dungeons & Dragons Dragonlance series of game modules. It is one of the 14 Dragonlance adventures published by TSR between 1984 and 1986. Its cover features a painting by Jeff Easley depicting Tasslehoff Burrfoot peering at a red dragon and Verminaard of the Dragonarmies of Ansalon.

Kapak Draconians make their debut in this module; Aghar and Baaz Draconians from Dragons of Despair return as featured creatures. The locations featured in this module are Qualinost and the Sla-Mori, a secret passage between Qualinesti and Pax Tharkas.

The same player characters (PCs) from Dragons of Despair are available again, with their character sheets reflecting that they have each increased a level from the previous adventure. Tika becomes a playable character at the end of chapter six, and Gilthanas, a new character, becomes playable at the end of chapter eight. Laurana, who becomes a playable character in DL6 Dragons of Ice, makes her debut in this module.

== Plot synopsis ==
Continuing from the previous module, Dragons of Despair, players reenact the Dragonlance story using the pre-generated characters. The player characters come back to their hometown which the find has been overrun by the forces of evil; the elves of Qualinost hire the characters to rescue the captives of the Draconians that are being held at the fortress of Pax Tharkas. In Dragons of Flame, the Innfellows are suffering thanks to the Draconians, and require aid from the troubled North Lands before going to save a population from their enslavement. When the adventure starts, Solace has been captured by Kapak Draconians. The dragon armies control the plains, but Qualinesti is not conquered. Plainsmen are being taken by caravan to Pax Tharkas to be slaves.

Chapter 5 – Que Kiri and the Plains

A short set of encounters on the plains and the ruins of Que Kiri show the effects of the dragon armies as the PCs travel back to Solace from Xak Tsaroth, where they finished Dragons of Despair. There is also an encounter to ensure the PCs are captured and taken to Solace if they head in another direction.

Chapter 6 – Solace

The PCs see the devastation at Solace, and are arrested in the Inn of the Last Home along with Tika and Gilthanas.

Chapter 7 – The Slave Caravan

As slaves being transported to Pax Tharsis, the PCs meet Gilthanas, and are rescued by elves.

Chapter 8 – Elvenhome

The elves, polite but aloof, update the players on the start of the war and suggest that they and Gilthanas should free the slaves and hostages in Pax Tharsis. Laurana is introduced, and soon after is kidnapped by Fewmaster Toede.

Chapter 9 – To the Walls of Pax Tharkas

The heroes and Gilthanas, who becomes a PC, travel overland for a day, then enter and traverse Sla-Mori, the secret passages that lead into the fortress of Pax Tharkas.

Chapter 10 – The Tharkadan Towers

In a section of Pax Tharkas, the heroes must find and rescue all the children, women, and men who are being held prisoner in different locations. Besides all the draconian or hobgoblin guards, they must avoid two ancient red dragons and dragon highlord Verminaard.

== Publication history ==
DL2 Dragons of Flame was designed by Douglas Niles, et al., features art by Jeff Easley, and was published by TSR in 1984 as a thirty-two page booklet with an outer cover.

== Reception ==
In Issue 31 of Abyss, John Schuller noted that this "may not be brilliantly innovative, but is at least reasonably thought out and fairly convincing." Schuller did note that there were a few weak points, "such as a rather sketchy and randomized encounter section and some nods to standard D&D monsters." Despite this, Schuller concluded, "This is about the best work of this sort which I have seen from TSR and is as good or better than some of the alternatives from publishers like Gamelords or Mayfair."

In The Space Gamer No. 73, Rick Swan praised the module for its vivid and non-stereotypical characterizations, challenging and engaging encounters, and well-crafted storyline. He did note "The story is so tightly scripted that occasionally players may feel more like observers rather than participants", and cautioned that Dungeon Masters (DMs) will need to stay alert to keep players on track. However, he concluded "If you've given up on Dungeons & Dragons, Dragons of Flame is a great way to get reacquainted."

In the British magazine Imagine, Steve Hampshire noted that this module retained many its predecessor's strengths of detail, clarity and layout. However, Hampshire had a few reservations about Dragons of Flame, pointing out "the players have to go along with the plot to make any sense of it at all" and felt that, given the lack of real freedom for players, keeping up interest might be a problem. Hampshire also thought this adventure was fairly short and would make little sense outside of the DL series. However, Hampshire concluded, "as one of the series [...] it has 'Dallas' appeal."

in the July 1985 issue of White Dwarf, Graham Staplehurst noted "anyone thinking of running the whole of the DragonLance saga should bear in mind the potentially confining feeling that is part and parcel of this series ... it's debatable how close this is to the original concept of role-playing." Staplehurst warned, "The players will have to adapt to fit the characters rather than the other way round." Staplhurst concluded by giving this module a rating of 7 out of 10 overall, saying, "the players are treated as idiots if they do anything but the stated actions and though this may be a useful trick for less experienced players, it is extremely frustrating when DMing and players come up with a potentially intelligent suggestion or plan only to have to shoot it down because it 'doesn't fit the story'."

== Adaptations ==
Dragons of Flame was adapted into a video game of the same name that was released in 1989. The game is a sequel to Heroes of the Lance and like it, is arcade oriented, with few role-playing video game elements. This module has also been converted into a Neverwinter Nights adventure, requiring both the Hordes of the Underdark expansion pack and the original game.
