= Kender (Dragonlance) =

Type of fantasy race

- The kender Tasslehoff Burrfoot, on the right. Image created by Larry Elmore, for the cover "The War of the Lance"
- First appearance: "A Stone's Throw Away" by Roger E. Moore, Dragon #85 (May 1984)
- Based on: Halfling

In-universe information
- Type: Humanoid

Kender are a type of fantasy race first developed for the Dragonlance campaign setting for the Dungeons & Dragons fantasy role playing game published by TSR, Inc. in 1984. The first kender character was created by Harold Johnson as a player character in a series of role-playing adventures co-authored by Tracy Hickman and Margaret Weis. Weis and Hickman's Dragonlance shared world novels introduced the kender to readers and players alike, largely through the character Tasslehoff Burrfoot, who became one of the main protagonists in the series.

Tasslehoff first appeared in the Dragonlance adventure module DL1 Dragons of Despair, published in March 1984; later that year, the kender's first literary appearance was in the novel Dragons of Autumn Twilight, published in November 1984. The kender are often compared to notable diminutive humanoid peoples in other fantasy fiction, such as the hobbits of Middle-earth or halflings featured in Dungeons & Dragons campaign settings.

== Conception and development ==
In preparation for the Dragonlance setting, Tracy Hickman ran a series of Dungeons & Dragons adventures. Harold Johnson, one of those involved in the games, chose to play a halfling thief character whom he called Almar Tann. When Hickman, Johnson and others moved to the Dragonlance setting for their games, the character of Almar Tann went with them. It soon became clear to those involved, however, that halflings were unsuitable to the Dragonlance world. As Johnson described it, this was especially due to his character's possession of a ring of invisibility, so that "it all sounded too much like another story," referring to Bilbo Baggins and the One Ring. Halflings were then dropped from the campaign, and Johnson developed both the initial concept of the kender and the first representative of the fantasy race, Tasslehoff Burrfoot. To solidify the distinction, they were originally described as "thinner, more wiry, and more cunning and streetwise" than halflings, with mixed success: While Matt Barton and Shane Stacks assessed kender to be similar to Tolkien's hobbits, Daisy De Palmas Jauze considered them a novelty.

Roger E. Moore introduced the kender, and Tasslehoff Burrfoot, to the wider community through his short story A Stone's Throw Away, published in April 1984 in Dragon. While Hickman was involved in some of the development, he stated that it was Roger Moore who contributed the most in defining the kender's final iteration.

The original concept of the kender held that they were "savage, warrior children, ever curious, ever alert." This concept was altered dramatically when Janet Pack became involved in dramatic readings of the works, as Pack's personal characteristics had a strong impact on how those involved in the process viewed the kender. According to Jeff Grubb, she, "and as a result all kender since her, was cute. Extremely cute. Sweetly, lovably, frustratingly cute.... And it's hard, after seeing Janet play Tas, to imagine them any other way." Two of the other key characteristics of kender—their curiosity and kleptomania—were introduced by Hickman. Hickman was uncomfortable with the notion of a "race of thieves" in his games, but still wanted the skills typically associated with thieves, so he added their "innocent tendency to 'borrow' things for indeterminate periods of time."

Originally, kender were to be called "kinder", in reference to the German word for "children", but Hickman has reported that readers tended to read the name as "kind-er" rather than "kin-der" in print, leading to the decision to alter the spelling.

Shannon Appelcline noted that game designer John Wick commented in a 2009 podcast that: "Kender ... they don't make sense. It doesn't make sense for a race of sociopathic kleptomaniacs to exist in a culture. So how do you put that in a culture to make it make sense?"

== Description ==
=== Fictional origin ===
The Dragonlance books present three conflicting accounts of how the kender were created. In Dragons of Summer Flame, the Irda state that kender descend from the gnomes. When the Greygem of Gargath was released, the gnomes present who desired the gem for greed were turned into dwarves, and those who wanted it for curiosity were turned into kender. In the Tales trilogy, however, the dwarves state that when the Greygem came to Krynn, its chaotic magic transformed a group of gnomes into both the first kender and the first dwarves. Still again, it has been stated that in the final battle for control of the Greygem at Gargath's tower, the chaotic power of the gem transformed part of the dwarven army into gnomes, and part of the elven army into kender.

Alternatively, in the novel The Forest King the Longwalker tells the story of his arrival in Krynn through a great cleft in the ground. The Longwalker states that a very clever girl named Fina decided to make a lodestone so powerful it would draw the gods down. All the people helped her until it was the size of a mountain. This drew down The Eye, which burned with such anger it melted the lodestone, and killed many of the people. They found a cleft and squeezed inside, going down through the earth to escape The Eye, traveling down for many generations. When they emerged on the other side they were smaller, and filled with wanderlust; they had become the kender. When asked if the story were true he replies, "How could it be?" This tale, however, is almost certainly the equivalent of a Krynnish folktale.

=== Appearance and traits ===
Illustration of a Kender from DL5 Dragons of Mystery, art by Larry Elmore (1985)

The kender are described in a review of DL1 Dragons of Despair, the adventure module where they first appeared, as: "wizened 14-year-olds and, unlike halflings, they wear shoes."

In Dragons of Autumn Twilight, Kender are described as "small boned" and rarely growing over more than 4 feet tall. Grubb adds to this, stating that the original intention was to depict them as being "wilder than halflings, fearless, sometimes cruel as only children can be". Things changed after Pack's dramatic readings, at which point they became "brave, fearless, taunting, and cute".

In Dragonlance Adventures, the kender are depicted with several qualities that make them stand out. They obtain a wizened appearance as they grow older, due to a fine network of lines that appears on their faces around age forty, and have pointed ears which gives them somewhat of a resemblance to elves. Kender tend to have a wide vocal range, enabling older individuals to perform impressive sound imitations. In addition, they are often depicted as rambling and speaking very quickly when excited, which can make them difficult to understand. Finally, they are described as having a distinctive topknot incorporated into their hairstyles, which is a source of pride.

When kender appeared in the computer game Champions of Krynn, released in 1990, they were described as "ever mirthful" and "a diminutive and highly playful race that resembles Tolkien's hobbit".

==== Curiosity ====
Hickman's primary contributions to the development of the kender were their curiosity and their tendency to "borrow" objects. His desire for the skills of a thief, without the associated moral concerns raised by a "race of thieves", led to depicting kender as possessing a habit of finding things that have dropped into their pouches by accident, picking things up in the streets, finding "junk", and generally acquiring things that belong to other people. This habit was justified in Dragonlance Adventures through Hickman's decision to provide the kender with enormous natural curiosity, a character trait which is also employed to provide the characters with lock picking skills and a tendency to "listen in on other's conversations".

Kender are described as not believing that there is anything morally wrong with handling others' items, although the habit may land them in considerable trouble with the owner of an object. In addition, they do not tend to pocket things like money, gems, and the like, as they are depicted as having little concept of monetary value. Kender oppose actual thieving vehemently, and consider being called a thief a great insult to their dignity.

As a side effect of these characteristics, kender can be difficult to play within the role-playing game, as their lack of interest in monetary gain is "a virtual anathema" to the manner in which characters of many other races are typically portrayed. It was recommended in The Mists of Krynn that kender be employed as non-player characters, with their kleptomania providing a convenient means for those running the game to introduce objects at critical times.

==== Taunting ====
In Dragonlance Adventures, kender are described as masters at the art of insulting people, using a wide repertoire of taunts, sarcasm, rudeness, and insults. This is made possible due to the shocking insights into an individual's character flaws that a kender can gain through his or her intense curiosity. Kender are also described in Dragonlance Adventures as using this ability to taunt creatures, causing them to become irrational and attack wildly or fall into some kind of trap.

In the computer game Champions of Krynn, kender are portrayed as "the only race that can taunt enemies, driving them into a rage ... and forcing them to focus their attacks on kender". Hickman explained that this characteristic in the kender was created by the game group which was responsible for creating the original saga. Although they thought it was a simple feature, including it in subsequent books proved to be a long-term challenge.

==== Fearlessness ====
Margaret Weis stated in The Annotated Legends that "a problem with writing kender is that they are supposedly fearless. However, if a situation arises where an author wants to create fear in a reader, the author needs to do that through making a character feel fear ... thus we came up with the idea that Tas could feel fear for people he cared for, even if he did not feel fear himself. This also adds more depth to Tas's character and makes him more human".

=== Culture and society ===
Within the game world, kender names are chosen from a wide range of sources such as recent events, an existing relative, or from items found in kender pouches, such as Bearchase, Lockpick, and Fruitthrow. As children, they constantly ask questions and come to rely on family and friends for needs, and they begin to take part in community activities. As they age, kender children gain education by hearing stories, desiring to acquire new skills, and playing games. They also begin handling and wandering. As kender reach the adolescent and teen-aged years, they become more active participants in Kender Moots, social gatherings where the youth can show off their newly found skills in games and demonstrations. As they near adulthood, kender experience intense wanderlust and leave home.

Most kender spend their entire adult lives wandering around the world. Most of the population of Krynn has been exposed to the adult variety of kender, and as such have adapted the word kender to mean thief, rogue, or cutpurse. Kender take great offense to these epithets, especially the last. The Annotated Chronicles cites the Dragonlance Adventures, which states, "Most Kender are encountered during wanderlust, a particular phase in a kender's life that occurs for most kender during their early 20s. Wanderlust may happen for many years ... and is responsible for spreading kender communities across the continent of Ansalon."

A kender's natural lifespan is about 100 years. They age slowly, remaining childlike in comparison to other races even when their bodies slow down. Kender view death as the next great adventure, and do not linger long in sadness after the passing of a loved one.

== Notable kender ==
Notable kender characters appearing in the Dragonlance novels include:

- Tasslehoff Burrfoot, one of the series' primary characters and one of the Heroes of the Lance. Tasslehoff first appears in a short story in Dragon before appearing in the novel Dragons of Autumn Twilight.
- Uncle Trapspringer, a legendary hero to whom every other kender claims he or she is related. He appears in Kendermore and Tales of Uncle Trapspringer.
- Kronin Thistleknot, who defeated the white Dragonarmy Highlord Toede during the War of the Lance. Kronin is first mentioned in Dragons of Winter Night.
- Earwig Lockpicker, Tasslehoff's cousin and a brief companion of Caramon and Raistlin. He appears in Brothers Majere.
- Damaris Metwinger, Tasslehoff's onetime fiancée, is featured in Kendermore.
- Sindri Suncatcher, the only known kender wizard, is featured in Dragonlance: The New Adventures.
- Koi Fearbreaker, who desires to learn to be afraid, is featured in Dragonlance: The New Adventures.
- Nightshade Pricklypear, a kender nightstalker and companion to the monk Rhys, is featured in Amber and Ashes.
- Chestal Thicketsway, is featured in Dragonlance: The Gates of Thorbardin.
- Emilo Haversack, is featured in Fistandantilus Reborn. He also appears in a crossover novel with Forgotten Realms, in which he aids the Forgotten Realms priest Joel of Finder in a quest, as told in the novel Tymora's Luck by Jeff Grubb and Kate Novak.
- Gaeadrelle Goldring, a spacefaring kender is featured in the Spelljammer novel The Maelstrom's Eye by Roger E. Moore.
- Razmous Pinchpocket, a seafaring kender is featured in the Age of Mortals novel Conundrum by Jeff Crook.
- Raf Tanglemop, the first of the new heroes to die in the aftermath of the Chaos War is featured in The Dawning of a New Age by Jean Rabe.

== Bibliography ==
- Chambers, Jamie (December 28, 2008). "UnCon Chat Transcript: Dragonlance Campaign Setting Q&A". Wizards of the Coast. Archived from the original on February 24, 2004.
- Fleishhacker, Joy (2007). "A Practical Guide to Dragons". School Library Journal. 53 (1).
- Hickman, Tracy. "Dragonlance FAQs". The Worlds and Works of Tracy Raye Hickman. Archived from the original on 2009-09-17.
- Hickman, Tracy; Weis, Margaret (1987). Dragonlance Adventures (1st ed.). TSR, Inc. ISBN 0-88038-452-2.
- Johnson, Harold (February 1995). "First Quest Column". Dragon Magazine (214): 70.
- Swan, Rick (1990). "Kender". Monstrous Compendium: Dragonlance Appendix. TSR, Inc. ISBN 0-88038-822-6.
- Weis, Margaret; Hickman, Tracy (1984). Dragons of Autumn Twilight. Random House. ISBN 0-88038-173-6.
