= Battlesystem Skirmishes =

- Author: Bruce Nesmith
- Publisher: TSR
- Publication date: 1991

Battlesystem Skirmishes is an accessory for the Advanced Dungeons & Dragons fantasy role-playing game.

== Contents ==
Battlesystem Skirmishes covers much of the same material as the second edition Battlesystem book, although on a smaller scale. Where in the Battlesystem rules one figure can stand for 10 characters, Battlesystem Skirmishes figures always represent a single character. One inch represents 10 feet in the Battlesystem Skirmishes rules; an inch equals 10 yards in the Battlesystem game. Core concepts such as armor class and THAC0 are similar to those in AD&D game characters, with the major difference involving the replacement of hit dice with simple "hits." Expanded rules cover movement variants (flying, climbing, levitating), special attack forms (aerial combat, mounted miniatures, breath weapons) and war machines (battle wagons, caravans, chariots). Dozens of spells are discussed, as well as the effects of a number of magical items. The book features glossy, full-color photos of painted miniatures, many of them staged in elaborate battlefield dioramas.

== Publication history ==
Battlesystem Skirmishes was published by TSR, Inc. as a 128-page softcover book, with design by Bruce Nesmith, and editing and development by Steve Winter and Annette Bumgarner. Figure painting was by Dave Hoppack, terrain scenosquares were by Duke Seifried and Creative Design, Inc., photography was by Photography Unlimited, and graphic design was by Stephanie Tabat.

== Reception ==
Rick Swan reviewed Battlesystem Skirmishes for Dragon magazine #178 (February 1992). Swan declared both the second edition Battlesystem and Battlesystem Skirmishes books "flat-out gorgeous, two of the best-looking products TSR, Inc. has ever published", and that they both "make terrific guides for figure painting and are a pleasure to thumb through, even for those with only a passing interest in miniatures games". Swan felt that regarding the already existing rules from the D&D for resolving combat between individuals, the Battlesystem Skirmishes rules "don't so much replace these procedures as streamline and amplify them", and he felt that "while it's less precise, the hit system is much easier to use in multicharacter battles than standard AD&D combat mechanics". He considered the expanded rules for movement variants, special attack forms, and war machines to be "all clearly explained and thoughtfully presented". While he felt that magic received a more thorough treatment than in the Battlesystem rule book, he felt that the spell and magic item lists were "by no means complete", and criticized that "As in the Battlesystem rules, there are few surprises, and the magic system remains the books most disappointing feature." Swan concluded the review by saying: "Even though it emphasizes the military aspect more than the magical, the Battlesystem game scores as a first-class miniatures game; engaging, challenging, and - considering its scope - surprisingly easy to manage. The Battlesystem Skirmishes game succeeds in smoothing over the rough spots in the AD&D combat rules, but it reaches the point of diminishing returns in battles approaching several dozen figures per side; at that point, you might as well use the Battlesystem rules. For its versatility and sheer volume of material, the Battlesystem book has the edge over the Battlesystem Skirmishes rules, but both books are recommended to AD&D combat aficionados and especially to students of figure painting - these photos are real knock-outs."
