= Dragonlance Classics =

D&D module

- The cover to Dragonlance Classics, Volume 1
- Code: DLC1 - DLC3

Dragonlance Classics is a series of adventure modules for the Advanced Dungeons & Dragons fantasy role-playing game.

== Plot summary ==
The cover to Dragonlance Classics, Volume 2

The Dragonlance Classics series reprints the original adventure modules from the 14 modules in the Dragonlance Saga series from 1984 to 1986 and updates them to AD&D 2nd Edition game rules.

Dragonlance Saga Classics, Volume 1 is a compilation of modules DL1 through DL4, revised for the 2nd edition rules.

Dragonlance Classics Volume III, the third and final installment, compiles the Dragons of Dreams, Dragons of Faith, Dragons of Truth, and Dragons of Triumph entries, omitting the Dragons of Glory board game. Players assume the roles of Tanis, Raistlin, and other characters from the early Dragonlance novels, then embark on a journey that takes them from the Red Dragon Inn to the depths of the Blood Sea.

== Publication history ==
The cover to Dragonlance Classics, Volume 3

DLC1 Dragonlance Saga Classics, Volume 1 was written by the TSR staff and published by TSR in 1990 as a 128-page book.

Dragonlance Classics Volume III was written by Tracy Hickman, Harold Johnson, Bruce Heard, and Douglas Niles, and published by TSR, Inc.

Several supplements were released in 1999 to update some of the most popular of TSR's Dungeons & Dragons adventures, including Against the Giants: The Liberation of Geoff (1999), Dragonlance Classics 15th Anniversary Edition (1999), Ravenloft (1999), Return to the Keep on the Borderlands (1999) and Return to White Plume Mountain (1999).

== Reception ==
Rick Swan reviewed Dragonlance Classics Volume III for Dragon magazine #215 (March 1995). He felt that the original Dragonlance Saga modules series "stands as one of the most ambitious and satisfying fantasy campaigns ever published. Time has diminished its appeal not a whit, evidenced by the Classics series" Swan comments: "Don't worry if you passed on the previous two Classics books; Volume III is self-contained, including enough background to make newcomers feel at home in Krynn. Whether you experience the Saga as a whole or an abridgment, it's not to be missed. They don’t make 'em like this anymore."
