= Diana Magnuson =

American artist

- Known for: Fantasy art

Diana Magnuson is an artist whose work has appeared in role-playing games.

== Career ==
Diana Magnuson earned a BA in art and German, with a minor in Education, from Gustavus Adolphus College, Minnesota. Her Dungeons & Dragons work includes the Dragonlance adventures Dragons of Ice, Dragons of Light, Dragons of War, Dragons of Deceit, Dragons of Dreams, Dragons of Glory, Dragons of Faith, Dragons of Truth, and Dragons of Triumph.

Magnuson is also known for illustrating children's books.
