= Dragons of Flame (video game) =

1989 video game

- Developers: U.S. Gold; Atelier Double (Famicom)
- Publishers: Strategic Simulations; U.S. Gold
- Composers: Hitoshi Sakimoto, Takeshi Yasuda (FM Towns/Famicom/PC-9801)
- Series: Dragonlance
- Platforms: Amiga, Amstrad CPC, Atari ST, Commodore 64, FM Towns, Famicom, MS-DOS, PC-9801, ZX Spectrum
- Release: 1989
- Genre: Action adventure
- Mode: Single-player

Dragons of Flame (ドラゴン・オブ・フレイム, Doragon obu Fureimu) is a video game released in 1989 for various home computer systems and consoles. It is a sequel to Heroes of the Lance.

== Gameplay ==
Like Heroes of the Lance it is arcade oriented, with few RPG elements. The style of the game is very much like its predecessor, horizontally scrolling fighting controlling one character at a time.

== Plot ==
It is based on the second Dragonlance campaign module, Dragons of Flame, and the second half of the first Dragonlance novel Dragons of Autumn Twilight. The plot is a faithful representation of the books it is based on.

== Development ==
Dragons of Flame was adapted from the Dragons of Flame printed adventure module. The game Shadow Sorcerer is a sequel to this game's storyline, but has quite different gameplay.

== Reception ==
Dragons of Flame was successful for SSI, selling 55,711 copies. According to GameSpy, "while the number of characters was increased to 10, the gameplay remained the same moderately competent, hack-'n-slash, side-scrolling action, marking this as another less than stellar entry on SSI's resume".

ST Action magazine reviewed the Atari ST version, giving it an overall score of 73%: "When U.S. Gold announced they were going to produce an Advanced Dungeons and Dragons range I thought we were going to be in for the usual graphic-lacking role-playing games. ... I've been proven very wrong. This latest game seems to offer more of a challenge than its predecessor, Heroes of the Lance. ... The thing I noticed about Dragons of Flame was the playability. Although the game uses complex menus, they have all been set out in a friendly, easy-to-use manner". ST Action also praised the variety of monsters, graphics, and "well implemented" gameplay.

== Reviews ==
- Alan (July 1992). "Review: Dragons of Flame" (review). Sinclair User (125): 43. ISSN 0262-5458.
- "Replay: Dragons of Flame" (review). Your Sinclair (78): 74. June 1992. ISSN 0269-6983.
- "Dragons of Flame" (review). Your Sinclair (58): 82. October 1990. ISSN 0269-6983.
- Review in Info
- Review in Page 6
