= Against the Giants: The Liberation of Geoff =

Dungeons & Dragons adventure module

- Authors: Sean K. Reynolds
- First published: 1999

Against the Giants: The Liberation of Geoff is an adventure module for the 2nd edition of the Advanced Dungeons & Dragons fantasy role-playing game. It is an updated version of the original Against the Giants, which was written by Gary Gygax in 1981.

== Plot summary ==
Against the Giants: The Liberation of Geoff provided a set of adventuring materials that expanded on the original three modules. The full text of G1, G2, and G3, were included, along with details of eighteen new adventure sites in Geoff, linked together as an integrated campaign. The new material in the 96-page book was written by Sean K. Reynolds.

== Publication history ==
Against the Giants: The Liberation of Geoff was published by Wizards of the Coast in August 1999 to commemorate the 25th anniversary of TSR.

Several supplements were released in 1999 to update some of the most popular of TSR's Dungeons & Dragons adventures, including Against the Giants: The Liberation of Geoff (1999), Dragonlance Classics 15th Anniversary Edition (1999), Ravenloft (1999), Return to the Keep on the Borderlands (1999) and Return to White Plume Mountain (1999).
