= Return to White Plume Mountain =

Dungeons & Dragons adventure module

- Rules required: 2nd Ed AD&D
- Character levels: 7 - 10
- Campaign setting: Greyhawk
- Authors: Bruce R. Cordell
- First published: 1999
- ISBN: 0-7869-1434-3

Linked modules
- S2; Return to White Plume Mountain

Return to White Plume Mountain is an adventure module for the Advanced Dungeons & Dragons roleplaying game released in 1999 by Wizards of the Coast under its then recently acquired "TSR" imprint. It is set in the World of Greyhawk campaign setting and is a sequel to Lawrence Schick's 1979 module White Plume Mountain.

The 64-page book was written by Bruce R. Cordell and updates the legend of the eponymous mountain and its previous inhabitant, the sorcerer Keraptis. In the Greyhawk timeline, the events in the module are assumed to occur 20 years after the events described in the original S2 - White Plume Mountain adventure.

== Cover text ==
In ancient times, a sorcerer named Keraptis searched for eternal life. Within the magma domes and steam vents of an active volcano, he conducted his arcane experiments. Eventually he faded into legend, and the world heard no more of Keraptis for more than a millennium.

Two decades ago, however, Keraptis reappeared in White Plume. The mountain and its insane lord proved too much for most, but eventually courage and justice triumphed. Keraptis was finally dead or so the world thought.

Now, twenty years later, a face has appeared in the volcano's smoke—the face of Keraptis himself, say those who should know. Is the vile wizard immortal after all? Or is there an even greater threat building beneath White Plume Mountain?

== Publication history ==
Return to White Plume Mountain was published in December 1999. Several supplements were released in 1999 to update some of the most popular of TSR's Dungeons & Dragons adventures, including Against the Giants: The Liberation of Geoff (1999), Dragonlance Classics 15th Anniversary Edition (1999), Ravenloft (1999), Return to the Keep on the Borderlands (1999) and Return to White Plume Mountain (1999).

== Reviews ==
- Pyramid
