= Dragons of Autumn Twilight =

1984 novel by Margaret Weis and Tracy Hickman

- Cover of the first edition
- Author: Margaret Weis and Tracy Hickman
- Cover artist: Larry Elmore
- Language: English
- Series: Dragonlance Chronicles
- Genre: Fantasy literature
- Publisher: Random House
- Publication date: November 1984
- Publication place: United States
- Media type: Print (hardcover, paperback)
- Pages: 448
- ISBN: 0-88038-173-6
- OCLC: 11540577
- Followed by: Dragons of Winter Night

Dragons of Autumn Twilight is a 1984 fantasy novel by American writers Margaret Weis and Tracy Hickman, based on a series of Dungeons & Dragons (D&D) game modules. It was the first Dragonlance novel, and first in the Chronicles trilogy, which, along with the Dragonlance Legends trilogy, are generally regarded as the core novels of the Dragonlance world. Dragons of Autumn Twilight details the meeting of the Companions and the early days of the War of the Lance. The novel corresponds with the first two Dragonlance game modules, Dragons of Despair and Dragons of Flame, but with a different ending. It introduces many of the characters that are the subject of later novels and short stories.

The title Dragons of Autumn Twilight follows a pattern with the other novels in the series, Dragons of Winter Night and Dragons of Spring Dawning, as they all start with Dragons, followed the names of the seasons, Autumn, Winter, and Spring, as well as a series of time, Twilight, Night, and Dawning.

Margaret Weis includes allusions to A Christmas Carol by Charles Dickens, one of her favorite stories. References include: But there was something disquieting about him—secret, silent, self-contained, and solitary as an oyster and The fate of mankind is my business. This quote is turned from meaning good to meaning harm.

== Publication history ==
Jean Black, the managing editor of TSR's book department, assigned Hickman and Weis to write first the novel Dragons of Autumn Twilight and then continue with the rest of the Dragonlance Chronicles series. The Chronicles trilogy came about because the designers wanted novels to tell the story of the game world they were creating, something to which TSR, Inc. (TSR) agreed only reluctantly.

== Setting ==
The novels take place on the fantasy world of Krynn, created specifically for the gameplay. The world once worshiped the True Gods, a pantheon unique to the Dragonlance saga, but has come to believe that the True Gods have abandoned the world and those in it. The world is just starting to recover from the loss of the True Gods and a group has sprung up seeking to replace the True Gods (the Seekers). The main focus of the novels is the continent Ansalon and the characters Tanis Half-Elven, Sturm Brightblade, Caramon Majere, Raistlin Majere, Flint Fireforge, Tasslehoff Burrfoot, Goldmoon, and Riverwind.

== Plot summary ==
The book begins with the return of a group of friends, consisting of Tanis, Sturm, Caramon, Raistlin, Flint, and Tasslehoff, who had separated to pursue their own quests and pledged to return in five years. Kitiara Uth Matar, the half sister of the twins Caramon and Raistlin, was supposed to be there as well, but only sent a mysterious note.

On the eve of their reunion, the Companions discover that the village where they are meeting has been taken over by a religious order called the Seekers. They are collaborating with the Dragon Highlords, who are preparing for the conquest of the continent of Ansalon.

The Companions soon discover that the Seekers are searching for a Blue Crystal Staff. When Goldmoon, a plainswoman in the same inn as the companions, heals a Seeker with her staff, the Companions are confronted by Highlord forces and are forced to flee the village.

The next day, the group is attacked by Draconians, reptilian creatures that serve as foot soldiers in the Highlords' army. The Companions are driven into the woods, where they are attacked by undead and rescued by a centaur. The group is charged to go to the ruined city of Xak Tsaroth to retrieve the Disks of Mishakal, an object containing the teaching of the True Gods that will be instrumental for the restoration of the faith in the True Gods.

2000 paperback edition cover.

After a lengthy trip on the backs of pegasi and several encounters with the forces of darkness, the companions enter Xak Tsaroth and meet some gully dwarves, diminutive and socially awkward creatures. One of the dwarves, Bupu, leads them to the dragon Khisanth, who is killed by the holy power of the Blue Crystal Staff. When this happens, Goldmoon is consumed by its flame and presumed dead. However, they later find her resting at the foot of a statue of Mishakal (the Goddess of Healing), which now bears the Blue Crystal Staff, and Goldmoon is blessed with true clerical powers. The Companions leave with the Disks of Mishakal. Bupu gives an ancient spellbook (formerly belonging to the archmage Fistandantilus) to Raistlin. When they return to the village to regroup they find it occupied. The Companions are captured by the Highlord armies and are chained in a slave caravan along with an elf named Gilthanas, the son of the leader of the elven nation of Qualinesti.

The group is freed by Gilthanas's brother, Porthios. They flee to Qualinesti, where Tanis is reunited with his childhood sweetheart, the exceptionally beautiful elven princess, Laurana Kanan. Laurana is still in love with Tanis and wants to marry him, but Tanis breaks her heart by telling her he is now in love with Kitiara.

The Elven King Solostaran convinces the Companions to lead an attack on the slave-mine Pax Tharkas to free the slaves from the control of the local Dragon Highlord. The Companions journey through a secret passage underground to Pax Tharkas and devise a plan to free the slaves. Laurana, desperate to win Tanis back, secretly follows the Companions. When Tanis discovers Laurana has followed them he angrily rebukes her for acting like a spoiled child. Laurana resolves to try to prove she is more than that.

The Companions infiltrate Pax Tharkas and Goldmoon heals Elistan, a dying Seeker, and converts him to the faith of the true gods. He becomes the first cleric of Paladine, and Goldmoon turns the Disks of Mishakal over to him. The Companions help the slaves break free. Laurana proves her worth in the battle by fighting bravely. The Dragon Highlord Verminaard and his red dragon Ember arrive to crush the revolt, but the insane red dragon Flamestrike kills Ember, while the Companions cut down Verminaard. A mysterious figure called "The Everman" later appears at a celebration following the freeing of the slaves, but flees after being spotted.

According to Tracy Hickman, "The restoration of truth and faith are... to a great extent, the theme of this first book in the series".

== Characters ==
=== Heroes of the Lance ===
- Tanis Half-Elven, a bastard half-elf and the leader of the companions, torn between the human woman Kitiara and the elfmaid Laurana.
- Sturm Brightblade, a squire to the Knights of Solamnia and deeply honorable man.
- Goldmoon, daughter of the chief of the Que-Shu tribe, bearer of the Blue Crystal Staff, and first true cleric of good since the Cataclysm.
- Riverwind, bodyguard and romantic interest of Goldmoon. His family was made outcast from their tribe for their belief in the old gods of Krynn, rather than worshipping the tribe's ancestors.
- Caramon Majere, a huge, muscular, sometimes slow-thinking warrior, with a deep affection for his brother, Raistlin, and a romantic interest in Tika.
- Raistlin Majere, a cynical, sarcastic, physically frail mage, distrusted by most of the other Companions, twin brother of Caramon.
- Flint Fireforge, a gruff old dwarf and old friend of Tanis.
- Tasslehoff Burrfoot, a happy-go-lucky, not-so-innocent and genial kender.

=== Other major characters ===
- Laurana Kanan, an elven princess and romantic interest of Tanis.
- Gilthanas Kanan, elven prince and brother of Laurana, he strongly disapproves of his sister's love for the illegitimate half-elf Tanis.
- Fizban, a muddled old wizard. Secretly an avatar for one of the true gods.
- Tika Waylan, a red-haired barmaid turned warrior and romantic interest of Caramon.
- Elistan, leader of the refugees who becomes the first cleric of the good god, Paladine.
- Dragon Highlord Verminaard, the leader of the Red Dragonarmy and a priest of the evil goddess, Takhisis. He seeks to destroy the elven nation of Qualinesti and exterminate the elves, generally seen as the most incorruptible defenders of Good on Krynn.

== Adaptations ==
=== Comic ===
Devil's Due Publishing adapted the novel into comic format. A trade paperback collecting the issues was released in May 2006. It was ranked 33 in the top 100 graphic novels in sales with an estimated preorder quantity of 2,634.

=== Movie ===
A movie adaptation of the novel was released on January 15, 2008. It is the first direct-to-video movie release based on the Dragonlance campaign setting of Dungeons & Dragons. The screenplay adaptation was completed by George Strayton, with creative assistance by Weis and Hickman, and Will Meugniot directed. The movie used both 2D and 3D animation, and was made by Paramount Pictures.

== Importance to Dragonlance ==
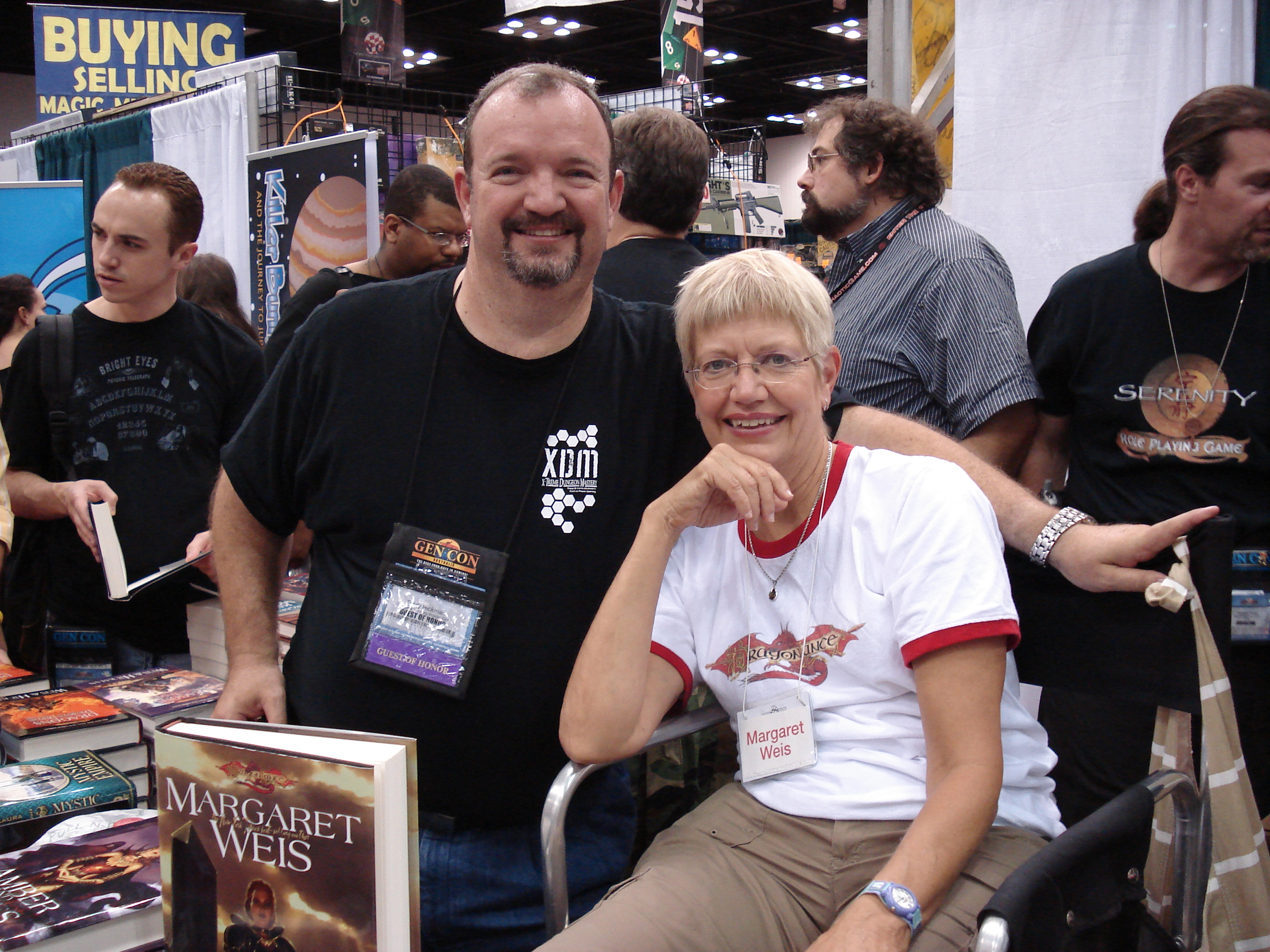
Dragons of Autumn Twilight was the first novel collaboration by Margaret Weis (seated) and Tracy Hickman (standing), pictured in 2008.

The storyline of the original Dragonlance series had been plotted and outlined before either the novel trilogy or the games were written. Dragons of Autumn Twilight was the first novel of the Dragonlance series. It was based upon a Dungeons & Dragons session played by the authors with some of their friends, some of whom later became Dragonlance writers. The novel was written after the completion of the first Dragonlance game modules. Weis and Hickman felt this was constraining and made the novel feel too episodic, so they reversed the process for the next books and completed the novels before the related modules were written.

This book sets up many of the most important characters, the group known as the Heroes of the Lance. According to the Dragonlance Nexus fansite, the Chronicles Trilogy sets the foundation for the rest of the novels. A Wizards of the Coast interview stated that Hickman and Weis make a good team because Hickman is better at writing about good characters, and Weis is better at writing about dark characters, evidenced by her love of Raistlin. Dragons of Autumn Twilight was the debut novel for both Weis and Hickman.

== Reception ==
Dave Langford reviewed Dragons of Autumn Twilight for White Dwarf #65, suggesting that it was "inspired by an AD&D campaign full of chunks ripped bleeding from Tolkien" and complained about the "deadly predictable questing, with stock D&D characters in familiar encounters" and ultimately reported that he "couldn't finish this one".

Steve Hampshire reviewed Dragonlance Chronicles: Dragons of Autumn Twilight for Imagine magazine, and stated that "in conclusion, the book stands up well as AD&D supplementary material, but rather less well as a novel".

Jason Heller, of The A.V. Club, wrote a positive review of Dragonlance Chronicles, remarking that Dragons of Autumn Twilight is still widely read, although he noted the clichés of the series: "In Dragons of Autumn Twilight, the adventurers meet up in a tavern—even if it is a tavern that's nestled in the branches of a giant tree, something my 12-year-old self thought was super cool. My 42-year-old self agrees, although my days of getting drunk way up high up in a tree are starting to wind down".

Dragons of Autumn Twilight was #10 on CBR's 2020 "10 Of The Best DnD Stories To Start Off With" list — the article states that "the reason that any aspiring Dungeon master or player should read this novel, is that it provides some great ideas on how to make common tropes seen in D & D more interesting. For example, the Companions in the novel provide a great framework to turn class-based archetypes into three-dimensional characters".

In the Io9 series revisiting older Dungeons & Dragons novels, Rob Bricken commented that "the characters are complex enough to feel real, and the scope of the novel makes Krynn feel like a living world".

== Reviews ==
- Review by Michael M. Levy (1985) in Fantasy Review, March 1985
- Review by Frank Catalano (1985) in Amazing Stories, July 1985
- Review by John C. Bunnell (1985) in Dragon Magazine, June 1985
- Review by Andy Sawyer (1986) in Paperback Inferno, #62
- Review by J. W. Wrenn (2004) in Deep Magic, #22, March 2004

== See also ==
- Dragons of Winter Night
- Dragons of Spring Dawning
- Dragons of Summer Flame

== Release details ==
- Weis, Margaret & Hickman, Tracy (1984). Dragons of Autumn Twilight (Paperback). Poetry by Michael Williams; interior art by Denis Beauvais. Lake Geneva, WI; New York, United States: TSR. ISBN 0-88038-173-6.
- Weis, Margaret; Hickman, Tracy (1986). Dragons of Autumn Twilight (Paperback). poetry by Michael Williams; illustrations by Denis Beauvais. Harmondsworth, United Kingdom: Penguin. ISBN 0-14-008718-4.
- Weis, Margaret; Hickman, Tracy (March 1990). Dragons of Autumn Twilight (Paperback). poetry by Michael Williams; interior art by Denis Beauvais. Lake Geneva, WI; New York: TSR. ISBN 0-88038-173-6.
- Dragons of Autumn Twilight (Library Binding). Topeka, Kansas: Rebound by Sagebrush. October 1999. ISBN 0-8335-3164-6.
- Weis, Margaret & Hickman, Tracy (February 1, 2000). Dragons of Autumn Twilight (Paperback). Poetry by Michael Williams; cover art by Matt Stawicki; interior art by Valerie Valusek. United States: Wizards of the Coast. ISBN 0-7869-1574-9.
- Weis, Margaret; Hickman, Tracy (April 1, 2003). Dragons of Autumn Twilight (Hardcover). poetry by Michael Williams; interior art by Denis Beauvais. Lake Geneva, WI: Wizards of the Coast. ISBN 0-7869-3064-0.
- Weis, Margaret; Hickman, Tracy (May 5, 2006). Mark Powers (ed.). Dragons of Autumn Twilight (Paperback). adaptation by Andrew Dabb. Chicago; London: Devil's Due Publishing. ISBN 1-932796-50-9.
- Weis, Margaret; Hickman, Tracy; Dabb, Andrew (July 26, 2006). Dragons of Autumn Twilight (Hardcover). Artists Steve Kurth, Stefano Raffaele. Chicago; London: Devil's Due Publishing. ISBN 1-932796-70-3.

== Sources ==
- Weis, Margaret; Hickman, Tracy (2000). The Annotated Chronicles. Renton, WA: Wizards of the Coast. ISBN 0-7869-1609-5.
