= Return to the Keep on the Borderlands =

D&D module

- Code: 11327
- Rules required: 2nd Edition AD&D
- Character levels: 1 - 3
- Campaign setting: Generic AD&D; Greyhawk
- Authors: John D. Rateliff
- First published: 1999

Linked modules
- The Keep on the Borderlands; Return to the Keep on the Borderlands

Return to the Keep on the Borderlands is a 1999 adventure module for the Dungeons & Dragons fantasy role-playing game. It is a sequel to the original The Keep on the Borderlands module (B2) from 1979. Both modules were published by TSR, Inc.

== Background ==
Although the original B2 publication was generic in terms of setting, the 1999 "Return" publication retroactively placed the Keep in the World of Greyhawk campaign setting, specifically in the southwestern Yeomanry.

The events depicted in the sequel take place approximately 20 years after those in the original B2 module. It is nevertheless an introductory adventure intended for low-level characters.

== Plot summary ==
Return to the Keep on the Borderlands was set twenty years after the events of the original module, and featured a fully re-stocked Caves of Chaos.

== Publication history ==
Return to the Keep on the Borderlands was written by John D. Rateliff, and published by TSR in June 1999.

Several supplements were released in 1999 to update some of the most popular of TSR's Dungeons & Dragons adventures, including Against the Giants: The Liberation of Geoff (1999), Dragonlance Classics 15th Anniversary Edition (1999), Ravenloft (1999), Return to the Keep on the Borderlands (1999) and Return to White Plume Mountain (1999).

== Reception ==
Andrew Byers, in his review of the adventure for Pyramid, commented that "much of this module is a dungeon crawl, but it's an intelligently designed one, with a fleshed-out base of operations for adventurers, an interesting wilderness environment, and some very good characterization of non-player characters. It could easily provide the basis for an extended campaign for low-level adventurers." Byers stated "If you're not nostalgic about the early days of D&D ... don't buy this book. But if you're interested in reliving (or experiencing for the first time) those first few roleplaying adventures... I don't think you'll be disappointed."
