= Tandem Library Group =

Cataloging company in the US

Tandem Library Group was an American company based in Topeka, Kansas. It provided title selection, online collection analysis, cataloging and processing services and customer support to libraries, publishers, and book wholesalers nationwide. Tandem Library Group's subdivisions, Tandem Library Books and Tandem Library Services, focussed on books and library services respectively, providing a source for collection development and analysis.

== History ==
The company started in 1965 as American/Econoclad Catalog Card Company, offering services to the library industry.

The company entered the library automation software market in 1998 with the acquisition of Nichols Advanced Technologies Inc. and its library automation products Athena and MOLLI, originally released in 1994 and 1995 respectively. In 1999 they acquired Winnebago Software, and that company's Spectrum library automation package, originally released in 1997 replacing Winnebago's earlier products CIRC/CAT and LCS dating back to 1982. The company later launched a product called InfoCentre, intended to replace both Athena and Spectrum.

The company changed its name in 2003 to Sagebrush Corporation, comprising two divisions:

- Sagebrush Education Resources—selling library books
- Sagebrush Education Technologies—library software and data services for libraries and publishers, including retrospective conversions.

In 2006, Sagebrush Corporation sold its library automation division to Follett Software. The Sagebrush Books and Library Services divisions continued to operate as an independent company which in 2007 announced its new name, Tandem Library Group. Sagebrush's Viewpoint division operated under a separate company.

In April 2008, the family who owned the company sold the books division to Mackin Library Services.

Later in 2008, the Library Services division, which became Savia Library Services, was purchased by E.F. Library Services LLC, owned by former employees of Winnebago Software.

Tandem Library Services' bindery was to operate as a separate company, Topeka Bindery. Savia closed the business in March 2009, but it was acquired and re-opened by Mackin later that month.
