= Advanced Dungeons & Dragons: Heroes of the Lance =

1988 video game

- NES box art by Jeff Easley
- Developers: U.S. Gold (Amstrad, Atari ST, Commodore 64, ZX Spectrum); Strategic Simulations; Natsume (NES); Tiertex (Master System)
- Publishers: Strategic Simulations; U.S. Gold; FCI (NES); Pony Canyon (Famicom)
- Composers: Brian Howarth; Iku Mizutani (NES); Seiji Toda (MSX/NES)
- Series: Dragonlance
- Platforms: Amiga, Amstrad CPC, Atari ST, C64, FM Towns, MS-DOS, MSX2, NEC PC-8801, 9801, NES, Master System, ZX Spectrum
- Release: 1988; Famicom/NES: NA: January 1991; JP: March 8, 1991; Master System: EU: December 1991
- Genre: Action-adventure game
- Mode: Single-player

Advanced Dungeons & Dragons: Heroes of the Lance is a video game released in 1988 for various home computer systems and consoles. The game is based on the first Dragonlance campaign module for the Dungeons & Dragons fantasy role-playing game, Dragons of Despair, and the first Dragonlance novel Dragons of Autumn Twilight.

== Gameplay ==
Screenshot from the Amiga version

Heroes of the Lance is a side-scrolling action game.

The eight heroes from the Dragonlance series are assembled for the quest, but only one is visible on the screen at a time; when the on-screen hero dies, the next in line appears. Heroes of the Lance uses Dungeons & Dragons game statistics, with character statistics taken exactly from the rule books. Three characters have special abilities (healing magic, wizard magic, and trap removal), but the other five merely act as "lives" for the player as in traditional action-platforming games.

== Plot ==
Heroes of the Lance focuses on the journey of eight heroes through the ruined city of Xak Tsaroth, where they must face the ancient dragon Khisanth and retrieve the relic, the Disks of Mishakal.

Even if it is a faithful representation of a portion of the novel Dragons of Autumn Twilight, it was a departure from the role-playing game module Dragons of Despair the book itself is based on.

== Characters ==
The eight heroes that make up the party are:

- Goldmoon, a princess who brandishes the Blue Crystal Staff, an artifact whose powers she seeks to fully understand.
- Sturm Brightblade, a powerful and solemn knight.
- Caramon Majere, a warrior who makes up for his lack of intelligence with pure strength and fighting prowess.
- Raistlin Majere, Caramon's twin brother; a sly and brilliant, but frail, mage.
- Tanis Half-Elven, the 'natural leader' of the heroes, and good with a bow.
- Tasslehoff Burrfoot, a kender pickpocket. He fights with a sling weapon known as a hoopak.
- Riverwind, Goldmoon's betrothed. He is a noble and wise warrior.
- Flint Fireforge, a grizzled dwarven warrior.

== Development ==
Heroes of the Lance was based on the original Dragonlance novels written by Margaret Weis and Tracy Hickman. Heroes of the Lance was not part of the Gold Box series; the nickname for these other D&D titles were "Silver Box" games. The NES version was developed by Natsume.

== Reception ==
Reception

Review score
| Publication | Score |
|---|---|
| Famitsu | 4/10, 6/10, 6/10, 2/10 (NES) |

Award
| Publication | Award |
|---|---|
| Your Sinclair | YS Megagame |

Heroes of the Lance was very successful for SSI, with 88,808 copies sold for computers in North America. After reviewing a pre-production copy of the DOS version of Heroes of the Lance, the magazine G.M. praised its graphics and "excellent" audio and said that "it would undoubtedly go straight to the top of the computer games charts and stay there for several months. It's that good". Computer Gaming World gave the DOS version of the game a similarly positive review. Jim Trunzo reviewed Heroes of the Lance in White Wolf, rating it a 4 out of 5 and stated that "Graphically, the product is inspirational, regardless of the machine on which it is being played. Full-figured characters and monsters and detailed backgrounds make the game a joy to look at as well as play."

Electronic Gaming Monthly columnist Seanbaby listed the NES version as the 2nd worst NES game, and as the 11th worst video game.

Levi Buchanan, in a classic Dungeons & Dragons videogame retrospective for IGN, wrote that if the players don't plan well, they can lose a lot of heroes in a very short period of time. He added that this offered a slight strategy angle, but D&D fans largely preferred the Pool of Radiance straight RPG approach. Pool of Radiance' sales were triple that of Heroes of the Lance. According to GameSpy, although the game was a fairly decent side-scroller for its time, it was also known for it frustrating level of difficulty, and its inability to save the game.

== Legacy ==
The storyline for this game continued in two subsequent video games, Dragons of Flame and Shadow Sorcerer.

== Sources ==
- Dykes, Big Al (December 1991). "Rerelease: Heroes of the Lance" (review). Sinclair User (118): 44. ISSN 0262-5458.
- Rich (January 1992). "Replay: Heroes of the Lance" (review). Your Sinclair (73): 82. ISSN 0269-6983.
- South, Phil (March 1989). "Screen Shots Part II: Advanced Dungeons and Dragons: Heroes of the Lance" (review). Your Sinclair (39): 80. ISSN 0269-6983. alternate html version of the review.
- "Fantasy Roleplaying: Heroes of the Lance" (review). Crash (62): 71. March 1989. ISSN 0954-8661.
- "Games Review: Heroes of the Lance". Sinclair User (83): 3435. February 1989. ISSN 0262-5458.
