= Dragons of Triumph =

Role playing game module

- Code: DL14
- Rules required: AD&D (1st Edition)
- Character levels: 10–14
- Campaign setting: Dragonlance
- Authors: Douglas Niles
- First published: 1986

Linked modules
- DL10 DL12 DL13 DL14

Dragons of Triumph is the fourth and final module in the third story arc of the 14-module Dragonlance (DL) series of the Dungeons & Dragons adventure role-playing game. The series was published by TSR between 1984 and 1986. The game's cover art work by Clyde Caldwell features Laurana Kanan chained on a platform before the goddess of evil, Takhisis.

== Plot synopsis ==
Dragons of Triumph is both an adventure scenario and the title of a sourcebook. The sourcebook details the continent of Ansalon, including its status before and after the war, and gives statistics for all of the draconians, monsters, and magical artifacts of Krynn. In the scenario, the player characters cross a land covered in smoke and fire to get to the capital of the Dragon Empire to confront the Dragon Queen in battle. In this final battle against Takhisis at her temple in Neraka, the Heroes of the Lance must force her to return to her own plane. The scenario includes Battlesystem statistics to enable the battle.

== Contents ==
The cover of the adventure includes a combined monster statistics list, as well as information for the two parties of Dragonlance characters, which split from each other in previous adventure DL6 Dragons of Ice, and details for the additional characters that joined the parties in the meantime; the players choose which characters they use from the two groups.

The module is separated in three sections: two booklets and a sourcebook. The first booklet contains background information regarding Krynn, with a comprehensive timeline running from the start of the age of dreams up to the ending of the War of the Lance. It also contains two maps of the continent of Ansalon, one before the Cataclysm and another showing where creatures are located after the war. The second map is meant to be used with other details given about Ansalon and the remaining factions to plan more adventures in Krynn. The source book also details creatures unique to Krynn as well as the most powerful magic items the characters will encounter during the events of the modules.

The second booklet includes maps for use while running the adventure, which are interspersed with Battlesystem rosters to be used with the whitestone and dragon armies. When the adventure is used with the Battlesystem rules, all necessary details are included for the characters to help lead the whitestone armies in battle with the combined armies of white, green, black, blue, and red dragons. The module gives multiple ways to defeat the Takhisis so that each Dungeon Master (DM) can choose the one that best fits the campaign, including an ending different from the novels to make the adventure more challenging.

== Publication history ==
The module DL14 Dragons of Triumph was written by Douglas Niles and published by TSR in 1986. Clyde Caldwell illustrated the cover, and Diana Magnuson, Larry Elmore, and Jeff Easley illustrated the remaining parts of the game set. The module consists of a 40-page book, a 32-page book, a 24-page sourcebook, a large color map of the world, and an outer folder.

== Reception ==
John S. Davies reviewed Dragons of Triumph for the British magazine Adventurer #7 (February 1987). He commented on the placement of the maps, writing, "It is handy having the maps in a separate book, and not having to flick backwards and forwards, or having to consult a large map like that presented for the tower of the high clerist." He noted that, as with the other Dragonlance modules, "Dragons of Triumph can be played alone, but is better played as the final part of the Dragonlance saga." He concluded, "When DL1 was released, it showed a lot of promise as a truly epic series, which unfortunately, some of the latter adventure packs have not lived up to. DL14, however, was well worth waiting for. It brings the heroes' quests to a culmination in a final battle against time and the Dark Queen, which could give any party a real challenge."
