= Battlesystem =

Tabletop miniature wargame

Battlesystem 1st Edition

Battlesystem is a tabletop miniature wargame designed as a supplement for use with the Dungeons & Dragons role-playing game. The original Battlesystem was printed as a boxed set in 1985 for use with the first edition AD&D rules. A new version of Battesystem for AD&D 2nd Edition was printed as a softcover book in 1989.

== First edition ==
=== Contents ===
Battlesystem was first released in 1985, compatible with either Advanced Dungeons & Dragons or the Basic / Expert Dungeons & Dragons (see editions of Dungeons & Dragons). The game was promoted as a successor to the medieval miniature wargame Chainmail.

In a Battlesystem game, each miniature represents a hero, a commander, or multiple troops, depending on the troops' level or hit dice. There are no statistics in the game for any troops or characters, but, instead, all are derived from the relevant Dungeons & Dragons publications. For instance, to add any creature from the Monster Manual or similar publications as troops, its in-game point cost can be derived from the XP reward listed in the Monster Manual for killing the creature.

The first edition of Battlesystem was a set of rules and components for use in playing mass fantasy battles, involving miniatures rules for metal or cardstock figures, or counters. The first edition set contained rules with beginner and intermediate levels of complexity, four battle scenarios, a guide to miniatures, a number of cardboard figures, and over 800 counters. It was meant to be used with either the Advanced Dungeons & Dragons game or the simpler Dungeons & Dragons rule book sets available at the time.

The first edition of Battlesystem was sold as a box set which contained:

- 32-page rule book
- 24-page scenario book
- 16-page guide to miniatures
- 2 Player Aid Cards
- 2 Metal Miniature Generals
- 3-D Adventure foldup Figures
- Army Roster Sheets
- 801 die-cut counters

The Rulebook is divided into four parts, allowing three levels of play. The first part is an introduction. The second part, called "The Basic Game", covers the basic rules of movement and melee combat. The third part, "The Intermediate Game", adds missiles, artillery, cavalry, individual Heroes, special formations and terrain effects. The fourth part, called "The Advanced Game", allows for magic, flying, weather, night battles and special monsters. It also introduces campaign rules that allow for integration of Battlesystem games into a role-playing campaign. The game does not require a Dungeon Master, although the Rulebook recommends use of a referee, especially if using certain magics such as invisibility or illusions.

The Scenario Book contains four scenarios. Three of the scenarios form a linked campaign in a generic fantasy setting, one for each level of the game. The fourth is an advanced game scenario for Dragonlance, Battle of Qualinost. It takes place during the same time period as DL2 Dragons of Flame, while the heroes are in Pax Tharkas.

According to the game's rules, it was designed to be played with either 25 mm or 15 mm miniatures. The game, however, does not require a certain size of miniatures. The official Battlesystem miniatures released at the time, except for two in the box set, were all 15 mm. At the time, many companies producing 25 mm figures were starting to make larger figures, sometimes even officially called as 'Heroic 25 mm' or 28 mm, that were difficult to fit or didn't fit on the official Battlesystem base sizes.

=== Publication history ===
The first edition Battlesystem set was designed by Douglas Niles and Steve Winter with a cover by Jeff Easley, and was published in 1985.

=== Reception ===
Roger Musson reviewed the original boxed set in Imagine magazine, giving it a positive review. He noted that the rules are fairly easy to use, although there are "some omissions and rules buried in odd places". Musson thought that "no self-respecting DM will want to be without the Battlesystem rules", although he found the other contents of the box of somewhat mixed value. Overall, Musson felt that the package is "to be welcomed" and that it "may provide a good introduction for many to the world of fantasy-wargaming".

Graeme Davis reviewed the original Battlesystem for White Dwarf, giving it a rating of 8/10 overall. He called the rules "concise and well-written". He felt that as a supplement to the D&D game, "the Battle System does what it sets out to do and does it very well; it may not be as detailed as some fantasy wargame rules, but it is adequate for the requirements of most role-players and can be used quite easily by anyone familiar with D&D or AD&D". Davis concluded by stating that "Battle System deserves to be given a chance, but I'm afraid that it may have priced itself out the market from the start."

Scott Dollinger reviewed Battlesystem for Different Worlds magazine and stated that "two good things did come out of Battle System. The first is that TSR is now producing some fine modules for large-scale combats. Even if one does not use Battle System the modules have a great deal of appeal for those individuals who enjoy simulation games as well as the role-playing variety. Second, the areas left undeveloped in Battle System make great article ideas for impoverished writers such as myself."

The original Battlesystem set won the H.G. Wells award.

== Second edition ==
=== Contents ===
The second edition of Battlesystem removed the counters, and focused only on miniatures. In the second edition, a figure represents either: 1) 10 infantrymen or cavalry, or 2) a single hero or other special individual, rated for Attack Dice, Armor Rating, Hits, Morale, and Movement, all derived from their corresponding statistics in the AD&D game. A character's THAC0 and maximum damage, for instance, determine his Attack Dice, while his armor class determines his Armor Rating. A figure's Attack Dice rating indicates the type of die it uses when attacking, from a low of 1d4 to a high of 1d12. In general, each figure in an attacking group is allowed one attack die; a group of eight figures with an Attack Dice rating of 6 rolls 8d6. The higher the roll, the more hits inflicted. The defending player rolls a number of dice equal to the number of successful hits; every roll exceeding the defender's Armor Rating cancels one hit. All hits not canceled by the Armor Rating rolls are taken as casualties. The magic chapter is about seven pages long, most of it devoted to descriptions of spell effects.

The book features glossy, full-color photos of painted miniatures, many of them staged in elaborate battlefield dioramas.

One of the more significant changes was making the use of 25 mm miniatures as standard. According to the rules, 15 mm could still be used, but the base size was increased to allow for larger miniatures. Additionally, all photographs in the rule book were of 25 mm miniatures.

=== Publication history ===
The second edition of Battlesystem was published in 1989, revised for use with 2nd edition Advanced Dungeons & Dragons. It was designed by Douglas Niles and featured a cover by Glen Taranowski. This version was a 128-page softcover book. Editing and development was by Kim Mohan, Jon Pickens, and Dave Sutherland. Photography was by Michael Weaver and Ral Partha Enterprises, Inc. for the battle scenes, and Dick Kahn Studio, Inc. for the rules diagrams. Figure painting was by Dave Sutherland, with interior art by Jeff Easley and Keith Parkinson, and graphic design by Stephanie Tabat and Dave Sutherland.

The second edition of Battlesystem became available in the form of two books called Battlesystem (1989) and Battlesystem Skirmishes (1991).

Despite positive reviews, sales for the set were disappointing. This led to it not being actively supported and used in role playing systems such as Dark Sun for very long even though the Dark Sun setting had been developed with the intent of holding large-scale battles. The 1992 Dragon Kings hardcover book, for example, included Battlesystem options, even though game designer Rick Swan considered them "useful but nonessential".

=== Reception ===
The game won the 1989 Origins Award for "Best Miniatures Rules of 1989".

Rick Swan reviewed Battlesystem for Dragon magazine #178 (February 1992). Swan declared both the second edition Battlesystem and Battlesystem Skirmishes books "flat-out gorgeous, two of the best-looking products TSR, Inc. has ever published", and that they both "make terrific guides for figure painting and are a pleasure to thumb through, even for those with only a passing interest in miniatures games". Swan suggests that players "frustrated by the tentative systems in the first-edition Battlesystem game" would be "in for a pleasant surprise with the second edition, a complete overhaul that's as impressive as the 1st-to-2nd Edition transformation of the Player's Handbook and Dungeon Master's Guide. Gone from the original game are the math-heavy combat tables, the awkward base sizes, and the quarter-page unit rosters; they're replaced by streamlined bookkeeping systems, cleaner attack procedures, and a plethora of clever options. Particularly welcome is the reduction of relevant statistics from a dozen-plus to a mere five." Swan felt that "the conversions are sound, if a bit convoluted, and produce acceptable results on the battlefield". He also felt that any players "willing to swallow the compromises inherent in the system will find the basic rules elegant and satisfying". He felt that while it was not unusual to roll a lot of dice to resolve a single combat engagement, "the system is preferable to the dreary bookkeeping required by too many miniatures games". He considered the magic system "Less successful", in that it "doesn't translate from the AD&D game as well as the combat rules, and that the descriptions of spell effects are "sketchy" and the spell list is "woefully incomplete" with fewer than 20 wizard spells discussed. Swan concluded the review by saying: "Even though it emphasizes the military aspect more than the magical, the Battlesystem game scores as a first-class miniatures game; engaging, challenging, and - considering its scope - surprisingly easy to manage. The Battlesystem Skirmishes game succeeds in smoothing over the rough spots in the AD&D combat rules, but it reaches the point of diminishing returns in battles approaching several dozen figures per side; at that point, you might as well use the Battlesystem rules. For its versatility and sheer volume of material, the Battlesystem book has the edge over the Battlesystem Skirmishes rules, but both books are recommended to AD&D combat aficionados and especially to students of figure painting - these photos are real knock-outs."

=== Reviews ===
- Dragão Brasil #11
