= Dragons of War (Dungeons & Dragons) =

- Code: DL8
- Character levels: 8 - 10
- Authors: Tracy and Laura Hickman
- First published: 1985

Dragons of War is the third game module in the Tales of Winter Night story arc in the Dungeons & Dragons Dragonlance series of game modules. It is one of the 14 Dragonlance adventures published by TSR between 1984 and 1986. Its cover features a painting of a dragonrider on a blue dragon attacking Sturm Brightblade on the battlement of the High Clerist's Tower.

== Synopsis ==
Dragons of War is an adventure in which the player characters go to the Tower of the High Clerist, and aid the Knights of Solamnia in battle against the draconians.

In this module, the players must help the Knights of Solamnia, who are stationed at the High Clerist's Tower. They stand between the Dragonarmies of Ansalon and Palanthas. The Knights are divided by politics and their code of honor, and the player's characters must bring them together.

== Publication ==
Dragons of War was written by Tracy and Laura Hickman, with a cover by Larry Elmore and interior illustrations by Diana Magnuson, and was published by TSR in 1985 as a 32-page booklet with an outer folder, and included an 8-page pamphlet and a large color map.

== Reviews ==
- The V.I.P. of Gaming Magazine #2 (1986)
- Abyss (Issue 38 - Summer 1986)
