= Dragons of Deceit =

- Code: DL9
- Rules required: AD&D (1st Edition)
- Character levels: 8 - 10
- Campaign setting: Dragonlance
- Authors: Douglas Niles
- First published: 1985

Dragons of Deceit is the fourth and final game module in the Tales of Winter Night story arc in the Dungeons & Dragons Dragonlance series. It is one of the 14 DL modules published by TSR between 1984 and 1986. Its cover features a painting by Larry Elmore of Gunthar astride a copper dragon next to Fizban.

== Plot synopsis ==
Dragons of Deceit is an adventure in which the player characters search for the evil city of Sanction to try to release the good dragons from an oath they swore against fighting evil.

In this module, the players must guide their characters into the Dragon Highlord's territory towards the city Sanction. The characters must search the city for a key to Highlord's lair. This will allow them to "solve the mystery of the dragons' oath" and "penetrate the deception of the Dark Queen in time to bring salvation to Krynn."

== Publication history ==
DL9 Dragons of Deceit was written by Douglas Niles, with cover art by Larry Elmore and interior illustrations by Diana Magnuson, and was published by TSR in 1985 as a 48-page booklet with a cardstock counter sheet and an outer folder.

== Reviews ==
- Abyss #38 (Summer, 1986)
