= Dragons of Faith =

Role playing game module

- Code: DL12
- Rules required: AD&D (1st Edition)
- Character levels: 9 - 10
- Campaign setting: Dragonlance
- Authors: Harold Johnson; Bruce Heard
- First published: April 1, 1986

Linked modules
- DL10 DL12 DL13 DL14

Dragons of Faith is the second of four parts in the third major story arc of the Dungeons & Dragons Dragonlance series of game modules. It is one of the 14 Dragonlance adventures published by TSR between 1984 and 1986. Its cover features a painting by Jeff Easley.

== Plot synopsis ==
Dragons of Faith is a continuation of the story of Dragonlance. The adventure begins roughly a month after the characters leave the elven forest of Silvanesti and concludes after the characters exit the city of Istar. The prologue provides the adventure background and the story up to that point, as well as an overview of how events are supposed to proceed, for the Dungeon Master to reference. In this scenario, the player characters escape the evil city of Flotsam to flee and cross the Blood Sea, where they find Istar, the City of the Deep, and get involved in an undersea battle. In the underwater city of Istar, the sea elves are threatened by a group of the dragon armies. At this point, if the players are using the Battlesystem rules, they can run the major underwater battle involving Istar, with the new rules provided with the module. The Dungeon Master draws cards from a Talis deck (the Krynn equivalent of the tarot), to determine specific events which occur during the adventure.

After this battle, the player characters must sail across the Blood Sea of Istar into enemy territory, evade the forces of the Dragon Highlords and according to the module's teaser, "capture the crucial pawn before darkness snatches it away!"

This module can be played as a stand-alone adventure or used as part of the larger sequence of Dragonlance adventures.

== Contents ==
The module comes with a sheet of cut-apart Talis cards, as well as game statistics and counters to be utilized with an underwater battle using the Battlesystem rules. The cover includes character cards depicting the pre-generated characters, as well as two new characters (one of which is a kender). The cover also includes a chart of combined monster statistics and a set of maps indicating where the events of the adventure take place. This set of maps is a double-sided large sheet depicting smaller locations in the adventure on one side, while the other side has a larger map showing the main battle area and intended to be used for the Battlesystem rules. The text explains how to use the Talis cards to predict events before they occur in the adventure, as well as how to use them in games of chance. The module has sixty-four pages, sixteen of which are pull-outs such as 20 non-player character character cards.

== Publication history ==
DL12 Dragons of Faith was written by Harold Johnson and Bruce Heard, with a cover by Jeff Easley and interior illustrations by Diana Magnuson, and was published by TSR in 1986 as a 64-page booklet with a large map, cardstock sheet, cardstock counter sheet, and an outer folder.

A pack of Talis cards, a fictional Krynnian card game, was included, along with rules for various games that could be played with them. Also included were Battlesystem miniatures rules.

Dragons of Faith was later updated for AD&D 2nd edition rules and included in "Dragonlance Classics III", which condensed the last four Dragonlance modules into one book.

== Reception ==
John S. Davies reviewed Dragons of Faith for the British magazine Adventurer #3 (August/September 1986). He notes that while this is the twelfth module in the Dragonlance series, it is only the tenth playable Dragonlance scenario. He noted that on the large sheet of maps, the city map is not numbered despite there being numbered locations given in the text, and one of the buildings is given a different name on the map sheet than in the module. Davies comments that Dragons of Faith "departs from the style of previous Dragonlance modules, in that it gives a lot of general background information for those areas that are not in the main storyline, and allows the characters a lot more freedom in how they reach their eventual goal". He goes on to say: "There is a lot going on, with various sub-plots for the characters to get mixed up in, some of which will reward them with useful information. Fortunately, DL12 does not have the complexity of DL10, though the DM still has a lot to keep track of." However, he adds that "Although there is a lot of freedom for the characters, they are still given plenty of guidance to get them back on the main plot, should they stray too far. There is also enough given for the DM to run a whole series of mini-adventures around the main plot." Davies concluded the review by saying the adventure was worthwhile and that the adventure "although expensive, is a pleasing continuation of the Dragonlance saga, though it does not work as a stand alone module".
