= DL series =

Dungeons & Dragons adventure module series

The DL series is a series of adventures and some supplementary material for the Advanced Dungeons & Dragons role playing game. These modules along with the Dragonlance Chronicles trilogy of novels, which follow one possible adventure series through the modules, were the first published items that established the Dragonlance fictional universe. The original DL series was released from 1984 to 1986, with the final two modules added to it in 1988. In the 1990s these roleplaying adventures from the original series were collected and revised for 2nd Edition AD&D as the three DLC Dragonlance Classics modules. There were also versions of the module series released in 1999, 2000 and 2006.

== About the DL module series ==
The DL series of modules were different from previously published Dungeons & Dragons modules in two ways. First, instead of being stand alone adventures, or a short series of adventures, they combined into a single large plot arc. This arc covered the War of the Lance. Second, players didn't use their own characters, as in other modules, they played preexisting characters such as Tasslehoff Burrfoot. This allowed for shorter character arcs within the larger story.

=== Early history ===
The Dragonlance game project began with an idea by Tracy and Laura Hickman of a world dominated by dragons. As they drove from Utah to Wisconsin so Tracy could take up a job with TSR in 1981 they discussed this idea. In 1982 Tracy proposed at TSR a series of three modules featuring evil dragons. When this plan reached then head of TSR Gary Gygax it fit well with an idea he had considered of doing a series of 12 modules each based on one of the official Monster Manual dragons. The project was then developed, under the code name "Project Overlord" to plan the series. The original group included Tracy Hickman, Harold Johnson, Larry Elmore, Carl Smith and Jeff Grubb. The Dragonlance Series Design Team was later expanded to also include Margaret Weis, Douglas Niles, Bruce Nesmith, Mike Breault, Roger Moore, Laura Hickman, Linda Bakk, Michael Dobson and Garry Spiegle.

=== Structure of the series ===
Dragonlance is a story, in contrast to many other Dungeons & Dragons adventures, particularly those that came before it, which are location or event based.

The module series is built around the structure of three "books" that are split up similarly, but not the same, as the Dragonlance Chronicles novel trilogy. Each "book" runs through four modules and contains sections of the adventure called chapters which have a continuing numbering system through that individual "book".

The first book, Tales of the Autumn Twilight, is in DL1-4. The first four modules "form the first stage in a massive quest-adventure using the same set of characters". DL5 is a sourcebook providing background on the setting useful for running all the adventures. The second book, Tales of the Winter Night, runs through DL6-9. The third book, which is never named, runs through DL10 and DL12-14. DL11 is a wargame that can be played by itself or as a campaign tool to create a backdrop for the individual adventures. DL15 and DL16 are anthologies of adventures. DL15 also contains source book material. These two were not originally part of the DL series but were added two years after the series was completed. The adventures included do not feature the main characters from the rest of the DL series, but are adventures that occur in and around the War of the Lance that the initial series details.

=== Relationship to the novels ===
Later in the development process it was decided that a trilogy of fantasy novels would be released with the modules. Originally an external writer was hired, but the design group found themselves more and more disillusioned with his work. At this point it was suggested that Hickman and Margaret Weis, an editor in TSR's book department who had become involved with the project, ought to write the books. They wrote the five chapters over a weekend and were given the job to write the accompanying novels based on that.

The first Dragonlance novel Dragons of Autumn Twilight was written after modules DL1-4 were completed. However, as Hickman and Weis felt this was too constraining and made the novel feel too episodic, they reversed the process for Dragons of Winter Night and Dragons of Spring Dawning and completed the books before the related modules. Aside from the novels, the modules were designed to connect with action figures and other merchandise relating to the concept.

Dragons of Autumn Twilight parallels the events in DL1 Dragons of Despair and DL2 Dragons of Flame. The events of DL3 and DL4 are not detailed in the novels but are consistent with leading up to the start of Dragons of Winter Night, which covers the events of DL6-10 and parts of DL12.

The authors were very careful to make sure that while the locations and settings of the novels coincided with the modules, and they equally made sure not too much was given away about the modules by deliberately changing some details about the modules. One of the purposes of the novel was to give Dungeon Masters a "truer feeling for the game world... This is hard to get across in the often dry, reference format of a game adventure module." People who play the games can recall how something similar happened to their group as they read the book, or someone who has already read the book can see the relationships between the book and experiences while playing.

=== Impact of the DL modules ===
The first Dragonlance item published after the original module/novels series was a hardcover Dungeons & Dragons manual called Dragonlance Adventures. This book, released in 1987, provided resources to allow Dungeon Masters to continue campaigning in the Dragonlance world. Two additional modules featuring anthologies of adventures, not planned as part of the original series, were added to the DL series in 1988, DL15 Mists of Krynn and DL16 World of Krynn.

The success of the original Dragonlance modules eventually led to several series of Dragonlance modules with the module codes DLA, DLE, DLQ, DLS and DLT.

Graham Staplehurst of White Dwarf magazine felt that after the first four modules had been released, the series had "developed into something potentially larger than any other linked venture ever produced by TSR", and that it "presumably will outstrip even the famous Giant-Drow series produced by Gary Gygax".

Gordon Taylor reviewed the first 14 Dragonlance adventures for White Dwarf #86, and stated that "Dragonlance is ultimately a fantastic story, but maybe not the greatest series of AD&D modules [...] That is not to say that Dragonlance is not packed full of epic and memorable adventures."

Scott Taylor of Black Gate in 2015 rated the Dragonlance series as #8 in "The Top 10 Campaign Adventure Module Series of All Time, saying "they aren't my favorite series, but they certainly deserve to be included with honor on this list."

In his 2023 book Monsters, Aliens, and Holes in the Ground, RPG historian Stu Horvath noted that the design of the adventure modules did not allow for creative play, saying, "The action is mostly on rails. There is a goal; there is one way to achieve it, and players move from 'Point A' to 'Point B' in order to do so, usually with a bit of pointless dungeon exploration in between. This framing strangles the events of many of the modules, even when a more relaxed approach was possible." Horvath concluded, "The original Dragonlance saga has moments of brilliance, but it never really delivers on its promise of world-shaking high adventure."

== The DL modules ==
=== DL1 Dragons of Despair ===
- Author: Tracy Hickman
- First published: March 1984
- Description: Dragons of Despair is the first Dragonlance product ever released, the start of the first major story arc in the Dragonlance. This events in this module corresponds to the first half of the novel Dragons of Autumn Twilight. The characters start on a road east of Solace after five years of looking for "lost clerical magic." An invading army has forced refugees out of the North, and Dragons have returned to the world after a long absence. They must follow the clues to restore the power of the old gods to the world of Krynn.
- Playable Characters: Tanis Half-Elven, Sturm Brightblade, Caramon Majere, Raistlin Majere, Flint Fireforge, Tasslehoff Burrfoot and Goldmoon.
- Notable first appearances
  - Characters: All PCs listed above, Riverwind (NPC henchman to Goldmoon), Tika Waylan, Fewmaster Toede and Khisanth.
  - Races: Draconians (Baaz and Bozak varieties) and Aghar (Gully Dwarves).
  - Places: Xak Tsaroth, Solace and Haven.

Dragons of Despair was positively received as a game module. It was number 25 on a 2004 list of "The 30 Greatest D&D adventures of All Time", the only Dragonlance module to make the list. It was seen as well written and presented with a unique feel to the world it is set in.

=== DL2 Dragons of Flame ===
Continuing from the previous module, Dragons of Despair, the players reenact the Dragonlance story using the pre-generated players. The player characters return to their hometown and find it overrun by evil; the elves of Qualinost hire them to free captives that the Draconians have imprisoned in the fortress of Pax Tharkas. In Dragons of Flame, the brave Innfellows are suffering thanks to the Draconians, and require aid in the beleaguered North Lands before setting off to rescue an enslaved population. Dragons of Flame was designed by Douglas Niles, et al., featured art by Jeff Easley, and was published by TSR in 1984 as a 32-page booklet with an outer cover.

=== DL3 Dragons of Hope ===
In Dragons of Hope, the player characters help the freed prisoners from Pax Tharkas to escape a draconian army, and help them find Thorbardin; to do so, the key to Thorbardin is hidden deep in the lair of an ancient wizard. DL3 Dragons of Hope was written by Tracy Hickman, with a cover by Keith Parkinson, and illustration by Parkinson and Larry Elmore, and was published by TSR in 1984 as a 32-page booklet with an outer folder and a large two-color map. The module comes with a large map and a smaller version for the DM, plus 2 detailed area maps and features art by Keith Parkinson.

=== DL4 Dragons of Desolation ===
The cover of Dragons of Desolation features a painting by Keith Parkinson which shows the heroes riding away from the floating tomb of Derkin. There is a very tiny TARDIS, Doctor Who, and K-9 hidden in the painting. In Dragons of Desolation, the player characters find their way into the underground kingdom of Thorbardin, where the dwarves are already contending with agents of the draconians. The characters must search a floating air-castle for the legendary Hammer of Kharas to gain the dwarves' aid. The module describes the realm of Thorbardin, which is mapped using repeating modular map pieces. DL4 Dragons of Desolation was written by Tracy Hickman and Michael Dobson, with Harold Johnson and Bruce Nesmith, with a cover by Keith Parkinson and interior illustrations by Larry Elmore and Jeff Butler, and was published by TSR in 1984 as a 32-page booklet with an outer folder and a large map.

=== DL5 Dragons of Mystery ===
Dragons of Mystery is a sourcebook on the world of Krynn and the characters in the Dragonlance series. This book covers the geography, creation myths, and the gods of Krynn, including articles on each of the heroes which detail how they originally met and background information for each. The book also includes an errata sheet for modules DL1 through DL4. DL5 Dragons of Mystery was written by Michael Dobson, with art by Larry Elmore, and was published by TSR in 1984 as a 32-page booklet with an outer folder and fold out map.

=== DL6 Dragons of Ice ===
In Dragons of Ice, after leaving Thorbardin, the player characters head south into the polar regions, journeying along the glaciers in search of Icewall Castle. The characters encounter Ice Folk, ice-skate boats, and the Walrus-Men. DL6 Dragons of Ice was written by Douglas Niles, with a cover by Larry Elmore and interior illustrations by Diana Magnuson, and was published by TSR in 1985 as a 32-page booklet with a color map and an outer folder. According to Jesse Willis for the website SFFaudio, this module features devices similar to the sails and roller ships featured in Philip José Farmer's "The Green Odyssey."

=== DL7 Dragons of Light ===
This scenario involves a wilderness trek through the savage land of Ergoth in search of the Tomb of Huma, the ancient hero who wielded the dragonlances. DL7 Dragons of Light was written by Jeff Grubb, with a cover by Larry Elmore and interior illustrations by Diana Magnuson, and was published by TSR in 1985 as a 32-page booklet with a large color map and an outer folder.

=== DL8 Dragons of War ===
In Dragons of War, the player characters journey to the Tower of the High Clerist, where they will aid the Knights of Solamnia in a pitched battle with the draconians; this battle can be resolved using Battlesystem, or with the simple battle rules included with the module. Dragons of War was written by Tracy and Laura Hickman, with a cover by Keith Parkinson and interior illustrations by Diana Magnuson, and was published by TSR in 1985 as a 32-page booklet with an outer folder, and included an 8-page pamphlet and a large color map.

=== DL9 Dragons of Deceit ===
In Dragons of Deceit, the player characters undertake a quest to the evil city of Sanction to find a way to free the good dragons from their oath not to battle evil. The module includes rules and counters to use in resolving an aerial battle between good and evil dragons. DL9 Dragons of Deceit was written by Douglas Niles, with cover art by Larry Elmore and interior illustrations by Diana Magnuson, and was published by TSR in 1985 as a 48-page booklet with a cardstock counter sheet and an outer folder.

=== DL10 Dragons of Dreams ===
In Dragons of Dreams, the player characters free the elven kingdom of Silvanesti from a plague of magical nightmares. DL10 Dragons of Dreams was written by Tracy Raye Hickman, with a cover by Clyde Caldwell and interior illustrations by Diana Magnuson, and was published by TSR in 1985 as a 32-page book and an 8-page pamphlet of maps and charts, with an outer folder. According to Lawrence Schick, in his 1991 book Heroic Worlds, the player characters in this adventure "encounter lots of dream-generated weirdness".

=== DL11 Dragons of Glory ===
Dragons of Glory is a sourcebook as well as a strategic-level board wargame which depicts the overall war between the draconians and the defenders of Krynn. The set describes the war and the opposing armies, using Battlesystem statistics for both sides. Dragons of Glory is a simulation game, designed to allow players to produce their own historical timeline of the events in the world of Krynn for an ongoing Dragonlance campaign.

DL11 Dragons of Glory was written by Douglas Niles and Tracy Hickman, with a cover by Jeff Easley, and illustrations by Diana Magnuson and Jeff Butler, and was published by TSR in 1986 as a 16-page pamphlet, an 8-page pamphlet, two large color maps, a cardboard counter sheet, a small zip-locked bag, and a double-thick outer folder.

=== DL12 Dragons of Faith ===
In this scenario, the player characters flee the evil city of Flotsam, crossing the Blood Sea, where they may encounter Istar the City of the Deep and become involved in an undersea battle. The Dungeon Master draws from a deck of Talis cards (the tarot of Krynn), to determine the events of the adventure. The module includes a sheet of cut-apart Talis cards, as well as statistics and counters for an underwater Battlesystem battle. DL12 Dragons of Faith was written by Harold Johnson and Bruce Heard, with a cover by Jeff Easley and interior illustrations by Diana Magnuson, and was published by TSR in 1986 as a 64-page booklet with a large map, cardstock sheet, cardstock counter sheet, and an outer folder.

=== DL13 Dragons of Truth ===
In Dragons of Truth, the player characters cross the draconian-occupied lands in search of the heart of the Dragon Empire, but they must pass tests set for them by the gods in order to find their way. DL13 Dragons of Truth was written by Tracy Hickman, with a cover by Jeff Easley and interior illustrations by Diana Magnuson, and was published by TSR in 1986 as a 40-page booklet with a large two-color map and an outer folder.

=== DL14 Dragons of Triumph ===
Dragons of Triumph is both a scenario and sourcebook; the sourcebook describes the continent of Ansalon, before and after the war, and all the draconians, creatures, and artifacts of Krynn. In the adventure, the player characters cross a land of smoke and fire to reach the capital of the Dragon Empire and confront the Dragon Queen for the final battle between good and evil; Battlesystem statistics are provided for this battle. DL14 Dragons of Triumph was written by Douglas Niles, with a cover by Clyde Caldwell, and interior illustrations by Diana Magnuson, Larry Elmore, and Jeff Easley; the module was published by TSR in 1986 as a 40-page book, a 32-page book, a 24-page sourcebook, a large color map of the world, and an outer folder.

=== DL15 Mists of Krynn ===
The Mists of Krynn includes twelve Dragonlance miniscenarios by various designers, plus supplemental material describing the nine races of Krynn (including the Kender and the various Draconians. The book also provides full statistics for eight legendary characters, such as Theros Ironfeld and the wizard Fistandantilus. The Mists of Krynn was edited by Mike Breault, with a cover by Denis Beauvais and interior illustrations by Valerie Valusek, and was published by TSR in 1988 as a 128-page book.

=== DL16 World of Krynn ===
World of Krynn presents four scenarios for player characters, including three dungeon crawls (a dragon's lair, a minotaur's island, and Dargaard Keep, home of the undead) and a wilderness quest. It was written by Douglas Niles, Michael Gray, and Harold Johnson, with a cover by Clyde Caldwell and interior illustrations by Yeates with Truman and Woch, and was published by TSR in 1988 as a 96-page book. In his 1991 book Heroic Worlds, Lawrence Schick called World of Krynn "Standard stuff", but felt that Dragonlance fans would find intriguing details in the book about the history of Krynn.

== Reprints and New Versions ==
The original series was updated to second edition and repackaged as the three Dragonlance Classics modules. These modules formed the DLC series, though by the time Dragonlance Classics Volume 3 was released TSR had stopped using the module code system. DLC1 Dragonlance Classics Volume 1 reprinted DL1, DL2, DL3 and DL4. DLC2 Dragonlance Classics Volume 2 reprinted DL6, DL7, DL8 and DL9. Dragonlance Classics Volume 3 reprinted DL10, DL12, DL13 and DL14. The modules that did not comprise traditional adventures, DL5 and DL11, were not available in this series.

In 1999 Wizards of the Coast published a new revision of the original Dragonlance story as part of their TSR's Silver Anniversary line. Dragonlance Classics 15th Anniversary Edition is a 256-page book which included information to run the game using AD&D or the SAGA System which had been used for other Dragonlance game material in the late 1990s.

In 2000 the entire DL module series was reprinted exactly as the originals but in a smaller size. This printing was available as two slip case sets Dragonlance Volume 1: DL1 - DL8 and Dragonlance Volume 2: DL9 - DL16.

In August 2004 The War of the Lance Campaign Book was released as a companion volume to the Dragonlance Campaign Setting. While this book detailed the times, locations and characters of the original series, it was not designed to recreate the original adventures but to allow new adventures to be played out that run in the same time and settings.

In August 2006 the first of an intended trilogy of adventures was released based on the original modules and the 1999 update, updating the story to Dungeons & Dragons v.3.5. Dragons of Autumn, subtitled "Dragonlance War of the Lance Campaign, Volume One", requires the use of the Dragonlance Campaign Setting and the War of the Lance Sourcebook. It is a 176-page softcover book by Clark Valentine and Sean Macdonald based on the original modules. The four chapters Despair, Flame, Hope and Desolation each correspond to the relevant DL1-4 Dragons of ... module. The maps have been redrawn and though the plot follows closely to the originals some changes have been made to keep old players on their toes. The second book, Dragons of Winter, was published in December 2007. The third, Dragons of Spring, was published in January 2008.
