= Larry Elmore =

American fantasy artist (born 1948)

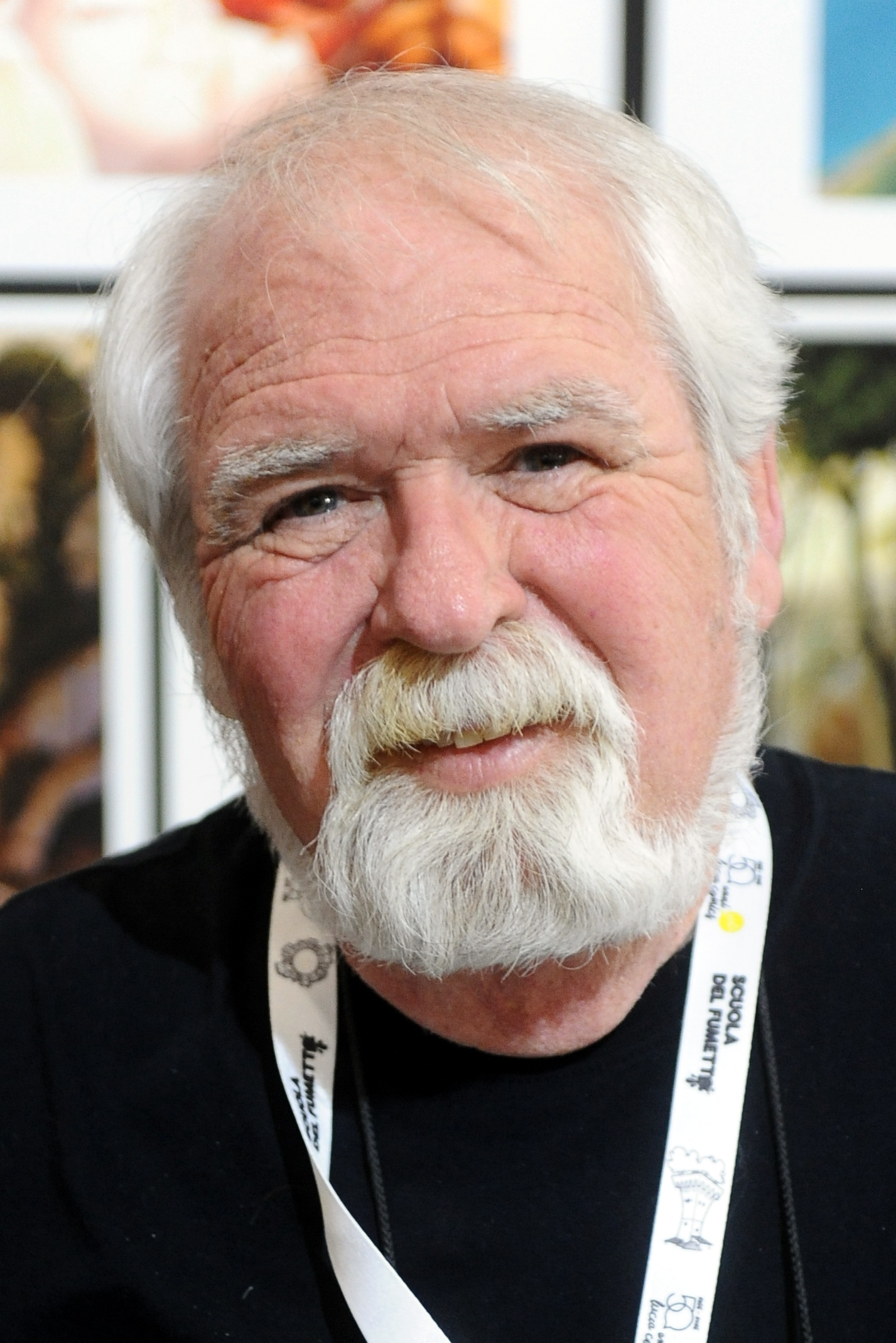
- Larry Elmore at Lucca Comics and Games 2016
- Born: August 5, 1948 (age 78); Louisville, Kentucky, U.S.
- Known for: Fantasy art
- Spouse: Betty

Larry Elmore (born August 5, 1948) is an American fantasy artist whose work includes creating illustrations for video games, comics, magazines, and fantasy books. His list of work includes illustrations for Dungeons & Dragons, Dragonlance, and his own comic strip series SnarfQuest. He is author of the book Reflections of Myth.

== Early life and education ==
Elmore was born August 5, 1948, in Louisville, Kentucky, and grew up in Grayson County in midwestern Kentucky. Elmore described his school days by saying, "The rural school I attended didn't have any art program, so I spent my time drawing - and daydreaming. I was a pretty bad student ... I was always getting into trouble for drawing in class. I wish I had a quarter for every drawing of mine a teacher destroyed." He majored in art at Western Kentucky University.

== Career ==
A month after graduating from college, Elmore was drafted into the U.S. Army and stationed in Germany. After leaving the service, Elmore worked as an illustrator for the United States government in the Fort Knox Training Aids Department. Three years later, Elmore turned to freelance work, his art being published in National Lampoon and Heavy Metal magazines.

One of Elmore's friends, a fellow government illustrator, introduced him to the Dungeons & Dragons game while Elmore was freelancing. Elmore joined the staff of TSR, Inc., the producers of Dungeons & Dragons, as its first professional illustrator, in November 1981, and created art work for adventure modules, game books, and novels, as well as paintings for posters and calendars. Elmore created the SnarfQuest comic which appeared in Dragon. During the "Project Overlord" development phase of the Dragonlance setting, Elmore created the concept artwork which was used to promote Dragonlance to the upper levels of management at TSR. Elmore was in charge of creating a look for the Dragonlance saga, and did many of the early sketches for the series, his first cover appearing on Dragons of Autumn Twilight. British game designer Graeme Davis commented that Elmore "... should get some kind of award for drawing so many dragons and making them all different".

Elmore left TSR in 1987. He has illustrated cards for the Magic: The Gathering collectible card game, and provided cover art for the MMORPG EverQuest. In 1996, Elmore wrote the novel Runes of Autumn with his cousin Robert. Elmore did most of the black-and-white artwork for Marc Miller's role-playing game, Traveller in 1996, published by Imperium Games.

In the late 1990s, Margaret Weis and Tracy Hickman used Elmore's fantasy world, Loerem, in their Sovereign Stone trilogy. In the early 2000s, Elmore created new Snarfquest comics for the short-lived magazine Games Unplugged, published by Ken Whitman's Dynasties Productions; Whitman later acted as product manager for Elmore Production, the art company of Larry Elmore. Elmore provided the artwork for the fantasy world in the Sovereign Stone Game System (1999). In 2004, Sovereign Press returned the rights for Sovereign Stone to Elmore, and he then licensed the game to the small press company known as White Silver Publishing.

Elmore scaled back his activities in 2006, switching to contract work only, stating, "A friend of mine, Keith Parkinson, who also worked at TSR, died of leukemia three years ago. We shared a studio, and we were always talking about how when we hit 50 we'd be doing our own thing. ... He didn't make it, and I was 57 and still pulling all-nighters. I was tired of it. I was tired of paying dues." His work appears in the book Masters of Dragonlance Art. Elmore released a book of artwork called 20 Years of Elmore in 2005. He has frequently been described as a legend in the fantasy and gaming communities.

In 2013, Elmore raised funding through Kickstarter for a 336-page hardback book of his artwork over his 40-year career.

In 2014, Scott Taylor of Black Gate, named Larry Elmore as #1 in a list of The Top 10 RPG Artists of the Past 40 Years, saying "Elmore not only helped define a good portion of 1980s TSR, but he also got to do the Shadowrun core cover for FASA that was so incredibly popular it reappeared on the 2nd edition and video game as well."

== Personal life ==
In 1971, before leaving for his Army service in Germany, Elmore married his wife, Betty. He has two children, and currently lives with his wife in Leitchfield, Kentucky. He attends fantasy and science fiction conventions held in the United States and Europe. He has said that inspiring others with his art has often been more rewarding than the money he earns in his profession.

== See also ==
- Jeff Easley
