= Margaret Weis bibliography =

This is a complete list of works by American science fiction and fantasy author Margaret Weis.

== Novels ==
=== Dragonlance ===
- Chronicles:
  1. Dragons of Autumn Twilight^{1} (1984), ISBN 0-7869-1574-9
  2. Dragons of Winter Night^{1} (1985)
  3. Dragons of Spring Dawning^{1} (1985), ISBN 0-7869-1589-7
- Legends:
  1. Time of the Twins^{1} (1986), ISBN 0-7869-1804-7
  2. War of the Twins^{1} (1986)
  3. Test of the Twins^{1} (1986)
- The Second Generation^{1} (1994)
- Dragons of Summer Flame^{1} (1995)
- Kang's Regiment:
  1. The Doom Brigade^{2} (1996)
  2. Draconian Measures^{2} (2000)
- The Raistlin Chronicles:
  1. The Soulforge (1998)
  2. Brothers in Arms² (1999)
- The War of Souls:
  1. Dragons of a Fallen Sun^{1} (2000) (Winner of the 2000 Origins Award for Best Game-Related Novel)
  2. Dragons of a Lost Star^{1} (2001)
  3. Dragons of a Vanished Moon^{1} (2002)
- The Dark Disciple:
  1. Amber and Ashes (2004)
  2. Amber and Iron (2006)
  3. Amber and Blood (2008)
- The Lost Chronicles:
  1. Dragons of the Dwarven Depths^{1} (2006)
  2. Dragons of the Highlord Skies^{1} (2007)
  3. Dragons of the Hourglass Mage^{1} (2009)
- Destinies:
  1. Dragons of Deceit^{1} (2022), ISBN 9781984819321
  2. Dragons of Fate^{1} (2023) ISBN 978-1984819383
  3. Dragons of Eternity^{1}(2024) ISBN 978-1984819420

^{1} (co-author Tracy Hickman)
^{2} (co-author Don Perrin)

=== Endless Quest ===
1. The Endless Catacombs (1984)

=== Darksword ===
(co-author Tracy Hickman)

1. Forging the Darksword (1987)
2. Doom of the Darksword (1988)
3. Triumph of the Darksword (1988)
4. Legacy of the Darksword (1997)
5. Darksword Adventures (1988)

=== Rose of the Prophet ===
(co-author Tracy Hickman)

1. The Will of the Wanderer (1988)
2. Paladin of the Night (1989)
3. The Prophet of Akhran (1989)

=== Star of the Guardians ===
1. The Lost King (1990)
2. King's Test (1991)
3. King's Sacrifice (1991)
4. Ghost Legion (1993)

=== The Death Gate Cycle ===
(co-author Tracy Hickman)

1. Dragon Wing (1990)
2. Elven Star (1991)
3. Fire Sea (1992)
4. Serpent Mage (1993)
5. The Hand of Chaos (1993)
6. Into the Labyrinth (1994)
7. The Seventh Gate (1995)

=== Mag Force 7 ===
(co-author Don Perrin)

1. The Knights of the Black Earth (1995)
2. Robot Blues (1996)
3. Hung Out (1997)

=== Starshield ===
(co-author Tracy Hickman)

1. Starshield: Sentinels (1996)
2. Nightsword (1998)

=== Dragon's Disciple ===
(co-author David Baldwin, her son)

1. Dark Heart (1998)

=== Sovereign Stone ===
(co-author Tracy Hickman)

1. Well of Darkness (2000)
2. Guardians of the Lost (2001)
3. Journey into the Void (2003)

=== Dragonvarld ===
1. Mistress Of Dragons (2003)
2. The Dragon's Son (2004)
3. Master of Dragons (2005)

=== Angel Series ===
(co-author, Lizz Weis her daughter)

1. Warrior Angel (2007)
2. Fallen Angel (2008)

=== Dragonships of Vindras ===
(co-author Tracy Hickman)

1. Bones of the Dragon (2009)
2. Secret of the Dragon (March 16, 2010)
3. Rage of the Dragon (April 24, 2012)
4. Doom of the Dragon (January 5, 2016)

=== Dragon Brigade ===
(co-author Robert Krammes)

1. Shadow Raiders (May 2011)
2. Storm Riders (July 2013)
3. The Seventh Sigil (September 2014)

Dragon Corsairs

(co-author Robert Krammes)

1. Spymaster (2017)
2. Privateer (2018)
3. Kingmaker (2019)

=== Anthologies ===
1. New Amazons (2000) (Illustrated by Anne Yvonne Gilbert)

== Role-playing games ==
=== Advanced Dungeons & Dragons 1st/2nd Edition ===
- Dragons of Flame (TSR, 1984) with Douglas Niles, Michael S. Dobson, Larry Elmore, Jeff Grubb, Tracy Hickman, Harold Johnson, Carl Smith, Michael Williams
- Dragonlance Adventures (TSR, 1987) with Tracy Hickman
- Tales of the Lance (TSR, 1992) with Harold Johnson, John Terra, J. Robert King, Wolfgang Baur, Colin McComb, Jean Rabe, Norm Ritchie, Tracy Hickman, Jeff Grubb, Doug Niles, Michael Williams
- Player's Guide to the Dragonlance Campaign (TSR, 1993) with David "Zeb" Cook, Michael Dobson, Jeff Grubb, Tracy Hickman, Harold Johnson, Douglas Niles
- The History of Dragonlance (TSR, 1995) with Marlys Heeszel, Tracy Hickman

=== Systemless ===
- Leaves from the Inn of the Last Home (TSR, 1987) with Tracy Hickman
- More Leaves From the Inn of the Last Home (2000) with Tracy Hickman
- Lost Leaves From the Inn of the Last Home (2007)
- Kobold Guide to Plots & Campaigns (Kobold Press, 2016) with Wolfgang Baur, David "Zeb" Cook, Clinton Boomer, Jeff Grubb, Kevin Kulp, Richard Pett, James Jacobs, Ben McFarland, Steve Winter (Winner of the 2017 Silver ENnie Award for Best Aid or Accessory)

=== Dungeons & Dragons 3rd/3.5 Edition ===
- Dragonlance Campaign Setting (Wizards of the Coast, 2003) with Don Perrin, Jamie Chambers, Christopher Coyle
- Age of Mortals (Sovereign Press, 2003) with Jamie Chambers, Christopher Coyle
- War of the Lance (Sovereign Press, 2004) with Tracy Hickman, Jamie Chambers
- Legends of the Twins (Sovereign Press, 2005) with Tracy Hickman, Chris Pierson, Seth Johnson and Aaron Rosenbeig
- Towers of High Sorcery (Sovereign Press, 2004) with Chris Pierson, Jamie Chambers

=== d20 System ===
- Redhurst Academy of Magic (Human Head Studios, 2003) with Matt Forbeck, Timothy S. Gerritsen, David Gulisano, Seth Johnson, Paul Tutcher

==== Sovereign Stone ====
- Sovereign Stone Campaign Sourcebook (Sovereign Press, 2002) with Timothy B. Brown, Jamie Chambers, David "Zeb" Cook, Christopher Coyle, Larry Elmore, Jeff Grubb, Tracy Hickman, Tim Kidwell, Don Perrin, Greg Porter, Lester Smith, James M. Ward
- Bestiary of Loerem (Sovereign Press, 2002) with Timothy B. Brown, Jamie Chambers, Christopher Coyle, Larry Elmore, Tracy Hickman, Brannon Hollingsworth, Andy Hopp, Ken Marable
- Codex Mysterium (Sovereign Press, 2002) with Larry Elmore, Tracy Hickman, Greg Porter
- Escape Into Darkness (Sovereign Press, 2002) with Jamie Chambers, Larry Elmore, Digger Hayes, Tracy Hickman
- Sanctuary (Sovereign Press, 2002) with Timothy B. Brown, Jamie Chambers, Jeff Crook, Larry Elmore, Digger Hayes, Tracy Hickman, Lester Smith
- Marauders of the Wolf: The Dwarves (Sovereign Press, 2003) with Larry Elmore, Tracy Hickman, Michael Lichucki, James M. Ward
- Elves (Sovereign Press, 2005) with Boris Ajdukovic, David "Zeb" Cook, Larry Elmore, Tracy Hickman, Stephen Sullivan, Margaret Weis, Trampas Whiteman

=== Cortex System ===
- Serenity Role Playing Game (Margaret Weis Productions, 2005) with Jamie Chambers, James Davenport, Tracy Hickman, Tony Lee, Andrew Peregrine, Nathan Rockwood, Lester Smith, Christopher Thrash, James M. Ward
- Serenity Adventures (Margaret Weis Productions, 2008) with Alana Abbott, Billy Aguiar, James Davenport, James M. Ward
- Wedding Planners (Margaret Weis Productions, 2013) with Monica Valentinelli, Robert Wieland
- Firefly Role-Playing Game (Margaret Weis Productions, 2014) with Cam Banks, Dave Chalker, Brendan G. Conway, Deanna Gilbert, Philippe-Antoine Ménard, Jack Norris, PK Sullivan, Mark Diaz Truman, Monica Valentinelli, Rob Weiland
- Smuggler's Guide to the Rim (Margaret Weis Productions, 2015) with Bill Bodden, Jaym Gates, Deanna Gilbert, Travis Heermann, Aaron Rosenberg, Brie Sheldon, Greg Stolze, PK Sullivan, Monica Valentinelli, Eddy Webb

=== Pathfinder ===
- Sovereign Stone Campaign Setting Core Rulebook (Timeout Diversions, 2013) with Larry Elmore, Tracy Hickman, Tony Lee
- Deep Magic (Kobold Press, 2014) with Wolfgang Baur, Creighton Broadhurst, Jason Bulmahn, Tim Connors, Adam Daigle, Mike Franke, Ed Greenwood, Frank Gori, Jim Groves, Amanda Hamon Kunz, Brandon Hodge, Stephen Radney-MacFarland, Neil Spicer, Mike Welham
