= Tracy Hickman bibliography =

This is complete list of works by American science fiction and fantasy novelist Tracy Hickman.

== Novels ==
=== Dragonlance ===
- Chronicles:
  1. Dragons of Autumn Twilight ^{1} (1984)
  2. Dragons of Winter Night ^{1} (1985)
  3. Dragons of Spring Dawning ^{1} (1985)
- Legends:
  1. Time of the Twins ^{1} (1986)
  2. War of the Twins ^{1} (1986)
  3. Test of the Twins ^{1} (1986)
- The Second Generation ^{1} (1995)
- Dragons of Summer Flame ^{1} (1996)
- Dragonlance Tales:
  1. The Magic of Krynn ^{1} (1987)
  2. Kender, Gully Dwarves, and Gnomes ^{1} (1987)
  3. Love and War ^{1} (1987)
- The War of Souls:
  1. Dragons of a Fallen Sun ^{1} (2000) (Winner of the 2000 Origins Award for Best Game-Related Novel)
  2. Dragons of a Lost Star ^{1} (2001)
  3. Dragons of a Vanished Moon ^{1} (2002)
- The Lost Chronicles:
  1. Dragons of the Dwarven Depths ^{1} (2006)
  2. Dragons of the Highlord Skies ^{1} (2007)
  3. Dragons of the Hourglass Mage ^{1} (2009)
- Destinies
  1. Dragons of Deceit ^{1} (2022)
  2. Dragons of Fate ^{1} (2023)
  3. Dragons of Eternity ^{1} (2024)
- Young Adult Chronicles:
  1. A Rumor of Dragons ^{1} (2003)
  2. Night of the Dragons ^{1} (2003)
  3. The Nightmare Lands ^{1} (2003)
  4. To the Gates of Palanthas ^{1} (2003)
  5. Hope's Flame ^{1} (2004)
  6. A Dawn of Dragons ^{1} (2004)

=== Darksword ===
1. Forging the Darksword ^{1} (1987)
2. Doom of the Darksword ^{1} (1988)
3. Triumph of the Darksword ^{1} (1988)
4. Legacy of the Darksword ^{1} (1997)

=== Rose of the Prophet ===
1. The Will of the Wanderer ^{1} (1988)
2. Paladin of the Night ^{1} (1989)
3. The Prophet of Akhran ^{1} (1989)

=== Death Gate Cycle ===
1. Dragon Wing ^{1} (1990)
2. Elven Star ^{1} (1991)
3. Fire Sea ^{1} (1992)
4. Serpent Mage ^{1} (1993)
5. The Hand of Chaos ^{1} (1993)
6. Into the Labyrinth ^{1} (1994)
7. The Seventh Gate ^{1} (1995)

=== Songs of the Stellar Wind ===
1. Requiem of the Stars (1996)

=== Starshield ===
1. Starshield: Sentinels ^{1} (1996)
2. Nightsword ^{1} (1998)
3. Dedrak's Quest (1998)

=== StarCraft ===
1. StarCraft: Speed Of Darkness (2002)

=== Sovereign Stone ===
1. Well of Darkness ^{1} (2000)
2. Guardians of the Lost ^{1} (2001)
3. Journey into the Void ^{1} (2003)

=== Bronze Canticles ===
1. Mystic Warrior ^{2} (2004)
2. Mystic Quest ^{2} (2005)
3. Mystic Empire ^{2} (2006)

=== Dragonships of Vindras ===
1. Bones of the Dragon ^{1} (2009)
2. Secret of the Dragon ^{1} (March 2010)
3. Rage of the Dragon ^{1} (April 2012)
4. Doom of the Dragon ^{1} (January 5, 2016)

=== The Annals of Drakis ===
1. Song of the Dragon (Jul 2010)
2. Citadels of the Lost (Jul 2011)
3. Blood of the Emperor (Jul 2012)

=== Dragon's Bard ===
1. Eventide ^{2} (Dec 2010 / June 2012)
2. Blackshore ^{2} (2013)
3. Moredale ^{2} (2023)
4. St. Nicholas and the Dragon^{2} (2012)

=== Blade of the Avatar series ===
1. The Sword of Midras: A Shroud of the Avatar Novel (2016, with Richard Garriott)
2. The Eye of Scales: A Shroud of the Avatar Novel (2022, with Richard Garriott)

=== The Nightbirds ===
1. Unwept ^{2} (2014)
2. Unhonored ^{2} (2016)

=== Other novels ===
- Shadow Over Nordmaar (1988) under the pen name Dezra Despain
- The Immortals (1996)
- Starcraft: Speed of Darkness (2002)
- Fireborn: Embers of Atlantis (2011)
- Wayne of Gotham (June 2012)
- Swept up by the Sea ^{2} (2013)
- Lincoln's Wizard (2015) with Dan Willis

== Dragonlance Reference books ==
- Dragonlance Adventures ^{1} (1987) - AD&D sourcebook
- The History of Dragonlance ^{1} (1995)
- Dragonlance Legends of Twins (2005) with Seth Johnson, Chris Pierson, Aaron Rosenberg, and Margaret Weis
- Leaves from the Inn of the Last Home (1987) - edited with Weis
- More Leaves from the Inn of the Last Home (2000) - edited with Weis

== Role-playing game-related ==
- Darksword Adventures ^{1} (1988)
- Secrets of Dungeon Mastery ^{1} (1988)
- XDM: X-Treme Dungeon Mastery ^{3} (2009)
- Sojourner Tales ^{2}(2013)
- Shroud of the Avatar: Forsaken Virtues (2018)

== Anthologies ==
- Margaret Weis & Tracy Hickman present: Treasures of Fantasy (1999) - editor of a collection of short stories
- "Heart of Goldmoon" in The Best of Tales (2000) - edited with Weis; story with Kate Novak
- "Anvil of Time" in The Best of Tales: Volume 2 (2002) - edited with Weis; sole author of story
- Dragons in the Archives: The Best of Weis & Hickman (2004)
- The Players of Gilean: Tales form the World of Krynn ^{1} (2003), editor
- "Here be Dragons" ^{1} in Dragons: Worlds Afire (2006)

=== Dragonlance anthologies ===
Hickman edited these anthologies with Weis.

- The Dragons of Krynn (1994)
- The Dragons at War (1996)
- The Dragons of Chaos (1997)
- Dragons of Time (2007)
- Relics and Omens: Tales of the Fifth Age (1998)
- Heroes and Fools: Tales of the Fifth Age (1999)
- Rebels & Tyrants: Tales of the Fifth Age (2000)
- The Search for Magic: Tales from the War of Souls (2001)

=== Modules ===
For Dungeons & Dragons:

- Rahasia ^{2} (1979)
- Pharaoh ^{2} (1980)

For Advanced Dungeons & Dragons:

- Ravenloft ^{2} (1983)
- DL series (DL8 - Dragons of War)^{2} (1984)
- Ravenloft II: The House on Gryphon Hill ^{2} (1986) - outline and plot

For Top Secret/S.I.

- TS1 - Operation: Starfire (1987) ISBN 0-88038-476-X
- TS2 - The Doomsday Drop (1988) ISBN 0-88038-480-8

For the Serenity Role Playing Game:

- Out in the Black ^{2} (2006)

^{1} (co-author Margaret Weis)
^{2} (co-author Laura Hickman)
^{3} (co-author Curtis Hickman)
