= Dragon Wing =

1990 novel by Margaret Weis and Tracy Hickman

- Authors: Margaret Weis; Tracy Hickman
- Language: English
- Series: The Death Gate Cycle
- Genre: Fantasy
- Publisher: Bantam Spectra
- Publication date: 1990
- Publication place: United States
- Media type: Print (Paperback)
- Pages: 432 (paperback edition)
- ISBN: 0-553-28639-0 (paperback edition)
- OCLC: 20637705
- Followed by: Elven Star

Dragon Wing (1990) is a fantasy novel by American authors Margaret Weis and Tracy Hickman, the first book in their Death Gate Cycle series. Following the Rose of the Prophet trilogy, Weis and Hickman embarked on an ambitious seven-volume series that began with Dragon Wing. As described by the publisher, "Preeminent storytellers Margaret Weis and Tracy Hickman have redefined epic fantasy. Since the publication of their Dragonlance series, millions of readers have enjoyed their imaginative world-building, rich characterization, and intricate storylines. Now these bestselling authors bring their talents to one of the most innovative fantasy creations ever in Dragon Wing, the first volume in The Death Gate Cycle."

== Plot summary ==
Arianus, the World of Air, is composed entirely of porous floating islands, aligned in three basic altitudes.

- In the Low Realm, the dwarves (called "Gegs", an elven word for "insects") live on the continent Drevlin and cheerfully serve the giant-sized Kicksey-winsey, a city-sized machine that is the source of all water in Arianus.
- In the Mid Realm, elves and humans have warred for centuries with each other and amongst themselves for water, status, and advantage. Above them all in the High Realm live the Mysteriarchs, isolationist human wizards of the Seventh House rank. They were some of the most powerful wizards of their kind, leaving fellow humans behind in their disgust for the constant warfare, but they never equalled the likes of the missing Sartan and Patryn races.
- In the Realm of sky, humans, elves, and dwarves battle for control of precious water—traversing a world of airborne islands on currents of elven magic and the backs of mammoth dragons. But soon great magical forces will begin to rend the fabric of this delicate land.

The assassin Hugh the Hand is about to be executed when he is rescued by Trian, the wizard who serves the human King Stephen. Trian gives him a contract to kill the child of King Stephen and his wife Queen Anne. The child is called Bane. Hugh thinks that Bane is being killed against the will of Queen Anne, but it is revealed after his departure that Anne and Stephen are allied in wanting Bane dead. Hugh departs with Bane, who's a creepy but beautiful and endearing child, and soon after they leave a man called Alfred catches up with them. Alfred is a courtier and serves Prince Bane, but he appears very weak and easily threatened, and keeps fainting whenever he is afraid.

They get close to Hugh's concealed dragon ship (an elven ship that he stole) and Hugh thinks that Bane has been killed by a falling shard from the glass trees, but by the time Hugh gets to the scene he is alive again. Then Hugh, Alfred and Bane start to fly to one of the other islands, but Bane poisons Hugh and the ship plunges down towards Drevlin and the Maelstrom.

Haplo, a Patryn, has arrived in Arianus through Death's Gate, the first Patryn to venture through it. He has been sent by his lord, Xar, to explore the world, because no Patryns have visited the worlds since the Sundering. Xar rescued Haplo from the Labyrinth, where he and all the other Patryn have struggled against countless monsters. In preparation for visiting mensch worlds ("mensch" being the derogatory term Patryns and Sartans use to refer to humans, elves and dwarves) he wears long clothes and has covered his neck and hands in bandages, to hide the runes tattooed all over his skin, that he uses to perform magic.

Haplo is not prepared for the strain of going through Death's Gate, which nearly destroys his ship. He crashes on one of the lower islands of Drevlin. He is found by a dwarf, Limbeck, who was thrown off the main Drevlin island for speaking against the leader of the dwarfs and encouraging them to question things, and work out why things are the way they are.

Jarre, Limbeck's girlfriend, and her allies rescue Limbeck from the lower island, as they planned, but Haplo comes up with him, and Haplo's dog. Limbeck thinks Haplo is a god but he says he is not a god. Shortly after Haplo and Limbeck get back to the main island of Drevlin, Hugh, Alfred and Bane crash land there in Hugh's dragon ship.

Limbeck's followers clash with the other dwarves, though neither side is particularly fierce or violent. In the confusion, Alfred falls over against the base of a statue in the centre of Drevlin, the statue that the dwarves call the "Manger". He opens a door below the base of the statue, and goes in, but then Jarre also falls down it and it closes behind her. She is terrified, having never been in this part of Drevlin before, but Alfred reassures her, and leads her through chambers near the heart of the Kicksey-Winsey. One such chamber is a mausoleum, which she realises is full of the dead of Alfred's people, and she sympathises with his grief. Alfred is a Sartan, but all the other Sartan that he used to live with in these chambers are now long dead. Alfred then leads Jarre back out of the Sartan chambers.

Another elven ship arrives to claim the regular tribute of water, to take back to their lands in the Mid Realm. The dwarves, led by Limbeck, refuse to give up the water and are in danger of being attacked until the elven lieutenant, furious at the cowardice and cruelty of the elven captain, mutinies against the elven captain and kills him. He is not the first elf to rebel—many other elves have started rebelling against their emperor in recent years.

Bane reveals that his father is a mysteriarch who purposely swapped him with Stephen and Anne's child soon after it was born, so that he could grow up and take over the Mid Realms in his father's name. Bane persuades the elven lieutenant to take him, Hugh, Alfred, Haplo and Limbeck to the High Realm to visit his father Sinistrad. Bane has been communicating with his father all his life, via a magical feather amulet. Over the course of the book it has become clear that Bane has magical power to make people love him (a spell cast by his father), and he is also able to manipulate people, but that he also wants to be loved by his father, and hopes to rule Mid Realm side by side with him.

On the way up to the High Realm Alfred uses a spell to send Haplo to sleep and sneaks a look under the bandages on his hands, and discovers that he is a Patryn, but Alfred does not know what to do with that information. Haplo is suspicious of him in turn, but has not guessed what he is.

Sinistrad tells his wife Iridal, who lives in terror of him, that their child, Bane, is coming up to see them, and she looks forward to being reunited with her child. Their High Realm is dying, because their magic cannot sustain life up there, where the air gets too thin and there is too little water. When the elven ship arrives, Sinistrad puts on the illusion that there is a large population of happy mysteriarchs to welcome them and lead them through an apparently beautiful city.

Sinistrad gives them a feast and tries to get Haplo to tell him more about what he is. Sinistrad also talks a lot to Bane, getting Bane to tell him all about the Kicksey-Winsey, because Bane has worked out what it does. But Bane is disappointed that his father treats him harshly, not lovingly, and talks of himself ruling alone, not alongside Bane.

Hugh falls in love with Iridal, and she with him, though he rejects Sinistrad's suggestive comments about them.

Bane tells Alfred that he knows Alfred is a Sartan, and Haplo overhears. Bane knows his father's plan is to drive the "Gegs" (the dwarves of Drevlin) to war, and to take over all the lower realms. Bane, knowing Alfred's magical powers, wants Alfred to help him take over instead, starting by killing Sinistrad. Alfred refuses to kill anyone. Alfred realises he might have been wrong to bring Bane back to life back when he was impaled by a glass tree shard. Haplo's dog enters and stops Alfred from leaving, and Haplo comes and confronts him. He tells him of what the Patryns had to endure after being cast into the Labyrinth by the Sartan, and Alfred tells him the Sartan never intended the Labyrinth to be a torment, and that the Sartan have since had troubles of their own.

Bane gives up on them both and goes off to kill his father. Iridal confronts Sinistrad, to save Bane, and Hugh gets himself killed saving Iridal—Sinistrad poisons him just before he dies himself. Once Sinistrad is dead, his dragon is free from his control and starts to attack the palace. Haplo drives it off for long enough to escape in the elven ship with the elf lieutenant (now captain), and Bane, and the dog. Iridal remains in the High Realm with Alfred. The elven ship joins the elven rebel army and Haplo returns through Death's Gate to his lord in the Nexus, taking Bane to be his lord's protege.

== Characters ==
Alfred Montbank

Bane's servant, whose body is disproportionate and causes him to be embarrassingly clumsy. He appears unassuming, but has secrets of his own.

Bane

Prince of the Mid Realm, and changeling child of mysteriarch Sinistrad. He is enchanting, in every sense of the word, using his supernaturally enhanced charisma to convince even the man hired to kill him to let him live. He lives to please his father, the only person in the world who will not love him.

Haplo

A loner, Haplo misses little but keeps his own counsel. Mild and almost unassuming for most of the book, he is nonetheless driven by his mission. Haplo is a Patryn, the ancient enemy of the Sartan, and is sent by his lord to scout the worlds before the Patryn conquest his lord has planned.

Hugh the Hand

An infamous assassin, Hugh was raised by Kir Monks after the death of his mother. His father, an aristocrat, abandoned Hugh's mother shortly after his birth. Hugh took revenge on his father after leaving the Kir Monks, sending himself down a path that would eventually lead to him becoming the most feared assassin in Arianus.

Jarre

Limbeck's girlfriend, who must constantly deal with his absent-minded ways. She is very supportive of him despite being not-so-keen on his unusual vision.

King Stephen

The current king of the human realm, ruler of both Volkaran and Uylandia via his marriage to Queen Anne. Though the marriage was originally for political convenience, the two have come to love one another dearly.

Limbeck Bolttightener

A dwarf with too many questions, he is awed by much of what he sees over the course of the book. He has not lost his childlike capacity to wonder, a value that Jarre (at least) values highly. He is considerably myopic.

Lord of the Nexus

Leader of the Patryns and the first of their race to escape the Labyrinth. It is he who learns of the existence of Death Gate and the four worlds. At this point in the series, he is also the only one of his people to return to the Labyrinth, saving the lives of his fellow people.

Sinistrad

Leader of the mysteriarchs and true father of Bane. He has lofty ambitions to extend his power over all of the realms, and plans to do so through his son, Bane, and other unknown methods.

== Literary significance and reception ==
The book hit the bestseller lists for Locus, Waldenbooks, and B. Dalton.

== Translations ==
Dragon Wing has been licensed and translated into many languages, including Czech, Danish, Dutch, Finnish, French, German, Hebrew, Hungarian, Italian, Japanese, Polish, Russian, Spanish, Swedish, and Turkish.
