= The Hand of Chaos =

1993 novel by Margaret Weis and Tracy Hickman

- Cover
- Authors: Margaret Weis; Tracy Hickman
- Language: English
- Series: The Death Gate Cycle
- Genre: Fantasy
- Publisher: Bantam Spectra
- Publication date: 1993
- Publication place: United States
- Media type: Print (Hardcover and Paperback)
- Pages: 468 (paperback)
- ISBN: 0-553-56369-6
- OCLC: 26633928
- Preceded by: Serpent Mage
- Followed by: Into the Labyrinth

The Hand of Chaos is a fantasy novel by American writers Margaret Weis and Tracy Hickman, the fifth of seven books in The Death Gate Cycle series. It was released in 1993.

== Plot summary ==
Samah has opened Death's Gate, allowing the dangerous dragon-snakes unfettered access to all four worlds. Haplo is too exhausted to capture Samah, so he returns to the Nexus and reports to Xar, his lord. Xar assigns Haplo to take Bane back to the air world Arianus, where Haplo will reactivate a city-sized machine called the Kicksey-winsey, which has stopped for the first time in history.

Haplo contemplates returning to the Labyrinth, the prison world of his people, the Patryn, but is intercepted by Zifnab, a Sartan. Sartans are the enemies of the Patryns; despite this, Haplo warns Zifnab to leave before Xar finds him. Bane informs Xar of this conversation and is ordered to kill Haplo for his betrayal.

Limbeck, the leader of a dwarf rebellion, enlists Haplo's help in reactivating the machine. Haplo, Bane, Limbeck, and Limbeck's wife Jarre must sneak through the elven base in the Factree to reach the machine's center. Haplo, Bane, and Jarre are separated from Limbeck and captured by red-eyed elves led by Sang-drax. Limbeck finds a room where members of all races sit peacefully together, but have frightening red eyes. He overhears elves discussing Sang-drax taking Jarre to his dragonship and plots to rescue her.

Haplo and Bane are taken to the elven Emperor, Agah'ran. Agah'ran is simultaneously fighting wars with humans, Gegs, and his own rebellious son. He plots with Bane to end the human war by assassinating Bane's adoptive parents, the human monarchs Stephen and Anne. Stephen, Anne, and Bane's true mother Lady Iridal learn that the elves are holding Bane captive.

The three do not want to rescue Bane, who is publicly charming but privately a power-hungry villain, but realize it would look strange if they failed to attempt to rescue him. Iridal decides to rescue Bane personally with the help of the retired assassin Hugh. He is persuaded to attempt to carry out a previous contract to kill Bane.

At the elven capitol, Hugh and Iridal seek help from a religious clan of elven mages, the Keepers of the Cathedral. Hugh pledges his soul to them in exchange. They slip into the Emperor's palace, where Iridal falls into a trap. In exchange for her life, Hugh agrees to kill the human monarchs for Bane.

Haplo is taken by the dragon-snakes and mentally tortured, but is rescued by the Keepers. The Keepers give Haplo a book written in every language, which will help him reactivate the Kicksey-winsey, and send him back to the surface. Iridal goes with him to stop Hugh and Bane. They find Sang-drax's dragonship. Haplo boards the vessel and rescues Jarre, but finds himself in the middle of a human mutiny. Jarre is injured before Haplo can teleport them to safety at the Factree. Limbeck is wrongly advised that Jarre is dead, and leads his rebel dwarves to massacre the elves in vengeance.

Sang-drax and his soldiers join the battle disguised as dwarves. Their red eyes give them away and they are revealed to be dragon-snakes. The battle becomes a chaotic three-way clash between elves, dwarves, and dragon-snakes. Sang-drax and Haplo sustain significant injuries. Limbeck eventually surrenders to prevent further losses. The snake-dragons begin to attack the Kicksey-winsey, causing the elves and dwarves to band together to stop them. Sang-drax's dragonship arrives and the human mutineers join the elves and dwarves against the dragon-snakes.

Hugh and Bane intercept a meeting between the human monarchs and the rebel elven prince. Bane demands Hugh accept a contract to kill Haplo, which Hugh accepts with no intention of following through. On arrival, Hugh intentionally botches his assassination of Stephen. Bane stabs Stephen and turns on Anne, but is magically suffocated by Iridal. Hugh returns to the Keepers of the Cathedral to fulfill his pledge to give them his soul. However, the Keepers cannot take it, because he is bound by the contract he made with Bane. The Keepers command Hugh to fulfill his contract by killing Haplo.

== Reception ==
The book hit the bestseller lists for Waldenbooks and B. Dalton.
