= Elven Star =

1990 novel by Margaret Weis and Tracy Hickman

- Cover
- Authors: Margaret Weis; Tracy Hickman
- Language: English
- Series: The Death Gate Cycle
- Genre: Fantasy
- Publisher: Bantam Spectra
- Publication date: 1990
- Publication place: United States
- Media type: Print (Hardcover and Paperback)
- Pages: 388 (paperback)
- ISBN: 0-553-29098-3
- OCLC: 24242329
- Preceded by: Dragon Wing
- Followed by: Fire Sea

Elven Star is a fantasy novel by American writers Margaret Weis and Tracy Hickman, the second book in The Death Gate Cycle series. It was released in 1990.

The book covers the reconnaissance of Pryan, by Haplo at the behest of the Lord of the Nexus. Pryan is one of the four elemental worlds in the universe of the series, created by the sundering of the Earth.

== Plot ==
In the prologue, a human Patryn named Haplo, is instructed to travel through the 'Death Gate' to Pryan, a mysterious "Realm of Fire", a planet that is incredibly large. He is directed to attempt to determine the purpose the planet was created for during the Sartan sundering, as well as to attempt to make contact with the peoples of Pryan, to observe them, their cultures and beliefs in a bid to understand them, so that his Lord may conquer Pryan more easily.

On Pryan, continuous sunlight and abundant rain have created a planetary jungle where humans and elves live in the trees and dwarves live near the ground. From the treetops, elves sell weapons to other races, whose ongoing warfare provides profits and resources upward. Generations of conflict and hostility remain unresolved, persisting even under the threat of destruction by the tytans. Using wits and a prophecy, elves, humans, and a dwarf unite to attempt to prevent world destruction.

Paithan, Calandra and Aleatha Quindiniar are the three adult children of one of the richest elves, Lenthan Quindiniar, who has made his fortune as an arms manufacturer. Now retired, he has since turned his interests to more fantastical - some might say insane - pursuits, leaving the Quindiniar children to take over the successful arms business.

In the course of Lenthan's activities attempting to create rockets that will allow for travel "to the stars" (the rockets he's developed thus far are little better than fireworks) he invites a brain-addled, seemingly confused old human wizard named Zifnab to his home, to help in his research. Zifnab often talks very strangely, sometimes making references to fictional works of historic Earth including Star Wars and Lord of the Rings, and references to now ancient popular songs. He is accompanied by a huge wingless dragon who serves him but also mothers him. After an alarming encounter with Zifnab's dragon, Paithan prepares to travel to human lands to complete a normal - but less than legal - arms deal. Troubling rumors swirl of a far off kingdom being attacked by mythical creatures, but as Paithan prepares to leave he brushes the absurd concerns aside, dismissing them as propaganda. Just prior to leaving, an alarming prediction is made by a suddenly bright-eyed and lucid Zifnab, that Paithan will bring doom, death and destruction back with him upon his return.

Paithan heads to the nearest human city to conclude the arms deal with two humans, half-siblings Roland and Rega. The two humans, posing as husband and wife, persuade Paithan to travel with their caravan to deliver the arms to the dwarf who ordered them. Paithan agrees, thinking to set up direct trade with the remote dwarven settlements, bypassing the current middleman arrangement. Roland and Rega secretly plan for Rega to seduce Paithan so that Roland can then accuse him of impropriety in order to blackmail him, ostensibly receiving the weapons and future shipments at a reduced price, securing more profit for themselves. Instead, in the intervening months traveling together, Rega actually falls in love with Paithan, and he with her, although a series of misunderstandings delay them in acknowledging their love for one another.

They travel through the enormous forest, drawing nearer to dwarven lands, months behind schedule. Rumors have continued to circulate regarding massive giants, tytans, wiping out entire human kingdoms beyond the dwarven lands, further to the north. While arguing about which path to take through the dense vegetation, they are surprised and captured by a group of tytans. The mythical creatures are finally understood to be very real and horrifying, moving in absolute silence through the jungle despite their massive size and complete lack of eyes. After failing to answer the tytans telepathic question as to the whereabouts of the citadel a member of their party is killed in brutal fashion. As Paithan, Roland and Rega come to terms with their impending deaths at the hands of their captors, Drugar, the same dwarf who was to receive the shipment of elven weapons, rescues them. After a panicked and chaotic escape Drugar explains to them that the people of the dwarven lands have been annihilated by the tytans; that without the promised elven weapons his people didn't stand a chance against them. He tells of the encounter, describing the tytans telepathic plea to the dwarves for the location of the citadel and the violent results when the dwarves fail to answer. Describing a grisly scene, he tells of a crushing defeat that has left few if any of his kind alive. Drugar states that he plans to escort the three back to their home lands, but covertly plans to deliver them into the oncoming path of the tytans, exacting revenge on them for failing to deliver the elven weapons on time, thus dooming his people.

In the meantime, Haplo has arrived on Pryan; guided to the Quindiniar homestead by Lenthan's rockets exploding. He retraces his confusing journey and with important contextual clues from the Quindiniars, realizes that he has passed through a Death Gate into the centre of a massive shell world or Dyson Sphere, a fact that he does not share with his hosts. Haplo, not trusting Zifnab, convinced that he must be a Sartan, initiates a brief confrontation where he attacks the old wizard to draw out his true identity. In a confusing turn of events, Zifnab seems to be completely immune to Haplo's powerful attacks and instead convinces Haplo that they must fly the ship immediately to rescue Paithan, but in classic fashion states he has no idea where they must go.

Paithan, Roland, Rega and Drugar manage to stay a step ahead of the tytans as they flee through the forests, and at last come upon the same human city that they had originally set out from. Thinking they've outrun the tytans, the group rests for a moment, the final moments before the tytans attack. The group watches in horror as the human city and thousands of refugees are torn asunder by the tytans. Haplo and Zifnab, flying to scout the cause of smoke on the horizon, arrive just in time to witness the group being cornered by yet more tytans. As they land to attempt a rescue, a self-assured Haplo tries to fight the tytans to keep them from destroying his ship and - underestimating their powers - is nearly killed. Caliandra sacrifices herself to save her siblings, and Haplo, Paithan, Aleatha, Roland, Rega and Drugar, Zifnab and the dragon flee in Haplo's ship.

They fly upwards towards the stars, and keep flying towards one star until they get close enough to see that it is a citadel, in a forest. Haplo has realised that all the "stars" are citadels scattered around the inner surface of Pryan. The city is surrounded by Sartan warding runes, but they are able to camp nearby.

Haplo leaves the mensch and flies away, back to Death's Gate. Zifnab's dragon pretends to kill Zifnab and attack the mensch, to drive them towards the citadel, and the dwarf Drugar finally realises that the amulet he wears, which is a single Sartan rune, can be used to open the doors and let them into the citadel, where they can live, safe from the tytans.

== Criticism and praise ==
Elven Star was reviewed by Booklist, Library Journal, Publishers Weekly, and Voice of Youth Advocates.

The book hit the bestseller lists for Locus, Waldenbooks, and B. Dalton.
