= Serpent Mage =

1992 novel by Margaret Weis and Tracy Hickman

- Authors: Margaret Weis; Tracy Hickman
- Language: English
- Series: The Death Gate Cycle
- Genre: Fantasy
- Publisher: Bantam Spectra
- Publication date: 1992
- Publication place: United States
- Media type: Print (Hardcover and Paperback)
- Pages: 450 (paperback)
- ISBN: 0-553-56140-5
- OCLC: 27773124
- Preceded by: Fire Sea
- Followed by: The Hand of Chaos

Serpent Mage is a fantasy novel by American writers Margaret Weis and Tracy Hickman, the fourth book in The Death Gate Cycle series. It was released in 1992, first published by Bantam Spectra.

== Criticism and praise ==
The book hit the bestseller lists for Locus, Waldenbooks, and B. Dalton.
