= The Death Gate Cycle =

1990–1994 novel series by Weis and Hickman

- The logo for the books
- Dragon Wing (1990); Elven Star (1990); Fire Sea (1991); Serpent Mage (1992); The Hand of Chaos (1993); Into the Labyrinth (1993); The Seventh Gate (1994)
- Author: Margaret Weis and Tracy Hickman
- Country: United States
- Language: English
- Genre: Fantasy
- Published: 1990 - 1994
- No. of books: 7

The Death Gate Cycle is a seven-part series (heptalogy) of fantasy novels written by Margaret Weis and Tracy Hickman. The main conflict is between two powerful races, the Sartan and the Patryns, which branched off from humans following a nuclear/anti-matter holocaust. Centuries prior to the events of the series, the Sartan attempted to end the conflict by sundering the Earth into four elemental realms, and imprisoning the Patryns in a fifth prison world, the Labyrinth. The Sartan took up stewardship of the elemental realms, but soon mysteriously lost contact with each other and disappeared. Centuries later, a Patryn known as Xar escaped the Labyrinth, and started returning to the Labyrinth to rescue others. He learned how to access the other worlds, using the eponymous portal called the Death Gate, and dreamed of freeing all his people from the Labyrinth and conquering the other worlds. The books follow the fiercely independent Haplo, a Patryn agent sent to scout the elemental worlds and throw them into chaos in preparation for his Lord's conquest of them. Weis and Hickman created five distinct fantasy worlds during the course of the series, along with developing the cultures of five major races: the unique Patryn and Sartan, and the common fantasy races of dwarves, elves, and humans.

== Novels ==
- Dragon Wing (February 1990)
- Elven Star (November 1990)
- Fire Sea (August 1991)
- Serpent Mage (April 1992)
- The Hand of Chaos (April 1993)
- Into the Labyrinth (December 1993)
- The Seventh Gate (September 1994)

== Behind the series ==
"Margaret and I have always tried to take fantasy literature in new directions. Krynn is a world wholly distinct from Earth, unlike Tolkien's Middle-earth. Time travel itself was a science-fiction notion we applied to fantasy. We have even written fantasies taking place in the far future (The Death Gate Cycle)!"

— Tracy Hickman, The Annotated Dragonlance Legends pg. 458

Margaret Weis and Tracy Hickman had finished their Dragonlance and Darksword series prior to The Death Gate Cycle, which may be considered their most ambitious work yet, as they created multiple fully realized and distinct worlds. The series also displayed Weis and Hickman's continued command of the fantasy genre.

As in their previous works, the authors continued to explore the theme of balance, and how the universe naturally works to correct imbalances.

Unlike in Dragonlance, where the universe's balance was a greater force than even the gods, the existence of a god or gods in The Death Gate Cycle is unknown; a universal balance is the closest thing to divinity. Along a similar line, the authors continued to explore the theme of men becoming gods—in this case with the entire Patryn and Sartan races clamoring for that throne. Finally, as in both Dragonlance and the Darksword series, they explored the effects of sweeping changes to the fundamental nature of a world (in this case worlds) on both the day-to-day life and the fate of nations.

Similar to the central concept of The Lord of the Rings, which J. R. R. Tolkien claimed was a translation of a real tome in his keeping (the Red Book of Westmarch), The Death Gate Cycle claims to be documentation of the events revolving around Death's Gate, authored after the fact by its primary characters. Even more than that, it is a scholarly document, with footnotes containing definitions of terms, references to past adventures and authorial asides. Each novel contains appendices giving further detail on various aspects of the story and its world, often summarizing (or occasionally laying the groundwork for) information related in the narrative proper. Finally, most of the novels also contain a musical score at the end, documenting a song (or sometimes a Sartan music-based rune-construct) featured in that particular volume.

== Worlds in the series ==
The Earth was destroyed.
Four worlds were created out of the ruin. Worlds for ourselves and the mensch: Air, Fire, Stone, Water.
Four Gates connect each world to the other: Arianus to Pryan to Abarrach to Chelestra.
A house of correction was built for our enemies: the Labyrinth.
The Labyrinth is connected to the other worlds through the Fifth Gate: the Nexus.
The Sixth Gate is the center, permitting entry: the Vortex.
And all was accomplished through the Seventh Gate.
The end was the beginning.

— Weis & Hickman, Into The Labyrinth pg. 9

=== Earth ===
Before the main timeline of the series, life on Earth was nearly wiped out. Humans unleashed a nuclear war that killed millions, leaving the survivors struggling in the Age of Dust. Elves and dwarves, who had gone into hiding during the Renaissance, also suffered from what the humans had wrought with their science. In this chaos, a mutant strain of humans emerged who were once again able to feel the Wave—that which maintains balance and order in the universe. Recognizing its potential for magic, they developed runes to harness it. Originally, there was only one group, the Sartan. The Sartan used magic by drawing runes on the ground and in the air, augmented by singing and spoken word; they believed that their power gave them responsibility and stewardship over the lesser races, whom they called mensch. The Sartan believed in community, unity, and family, the basis of Order. However, in their conceit, they forgot about the Wave's tendency to balance everything. As the Sartan became too powerful, the Wave shifted and the Patryns came to be. Unlike the Sartan, the Patryns were loners, volatile and destructive; they believed that their powers gave them the right to do as they would. Patryns tattooed the runes on themselves and chose their name to mock the Sartan (see Languages below). These two races came into conflict over control and influence of the mensch. Both came to think of themselves as gods, though the Sartan believed themselves to be the "good guys".

Eventually the Sartan, led by Samah and his Council of Seven, and driven by their own fear, undertook drastic measures. They broke the planet Earth into four separate worlds, each one focusing on a separate element (air, earth, fire, and water). This cataclysmic moment of destruction and re-creation is known as the Sundering. Millions of mensch died, with only chosen populations magically isolated for resettlement. The Patryns were captured and imprisoned in the Labyrinth which the Sartan created for their "rehabilitation". The Vortex (or the Sixth Gate) was the entry point to the Labyrinth, where the mensch were temporarily housed during the Sundering itself and where the captured Patryns were eventually placed. The books later reveal that certain members of the Sartan population had objected to The Sundering; these too were consigned to the Vortex and the Labyrinth. In the center of the Labyrinth was the Nexus, a paradise city for the Patryns to live in once they had become "civilized." The Nexus, the Labyrinth, and the Vortex are arranged in concentric circles. All of these worlds are connected by Death's Gate, and smaller, one-way gates called Conduits which allow each elemental world to transmit materials to one another.

The Sartan were left in stewardship of not just one world, but many, all designed to work in perfect harmony. The Plan of the Council of Seven was the grand construction of interconnected worlds, each with a specific function that fed into the whole. Almost immediately, however, things began to go wrong.

=== Chelestra, the world of water ===
Chelestra was to be the primary world where the mensch and Sartan would live. A great orb of liquid, the world was populated by great drifting beasts used as habitats for the mensch, with its own "Seasun" at the center. An appendix for Serpent Mage describes this liquid as not actually water, but a fluid which can be breathed through lungs and gills. Chelestra was also intended as a tremendous waste management and recycling plant, with the great floating habitat-beasts called "durnai" serving as biological recycling stations for the detritus from the other worlds. However, strange serpents, creatures of great power and corruption - that the Sartan had not created - began to appear. The Sartan could not account for their existence, but their danger was undeniable. Even worse, the emulsion fluid of Chelestra had a neutralizing effect on Sartan rune magic, rendering it and them utterly powerless. Surrounded by water that took away their power, no longer in control of the mensch, and faced with the serpents, the Sartan of Chelestra retreated into their capital. Samah, fearing what would happen if the serpents spread to the other worlds, shut Death's Gate, cutting communication between the worlds. The Sartan then placed themselves into a stasis sleep, expecting it to only last long enough for the other worlds to finish their parts of the grand plan and come help. This contributed to the disappearance of the Sartan from the mensch worlds, setting up the main series' events.

=== Arianus, the world of air ===
On Arianus, intended as an industrial and manufacturing world of floating continents, the Sartan had other problems. Cut off from communication with the other worlds (Chelestra specifically and the Council), the Sartan were slowly dying of some unknown cause, quickly becoming vastly outnumbered by the mensch. These Sartan also settled into hibernation, hoping for help from the other worlds. The Kicksey-winsey, a grand machine intended to align the floating continents and provide them with water (water being a direct byproduct of its production cycle), as well as manufacture all the processed goods desired by the other worlds, never became properly active. The dwarves, known on this world as Gegs, not truly understanding its purpose, effectively became slaves to the machine, worshiping it after a fashion as an artifact of their gods, the Mangers, (known to others as the Sartans) who had placed them there as its caretakers. The elves became tyrannical lords of much of the mid-realm through manipulation of the dwarves to obtain a monopoly on water, whilst constantly waging war with the humans.

=== Pryan, the world of fire ===
Pryan was created as a great inverted globe with four small suns at its center. It was to be the power plant and center for all four worlds, but it too fell into chaos. Great Citadels collected the energy from Pryan's four suns and beamed it through conduits to the other three worlds (the Colossi on Abarrach, the Kicksey-winsey on Arianus and the seasun on Chelestra). Covered entirely by miles-thick jungle (only the dwarves had ever seen the legendary 'ground') the Citadels were to be the bastions of civilization, where the Mensch would live a life of plenty and comfort. However, as with the other worlds, the Sartan mysteriously began to die. In fear, some citadels banished the mensch to the jungle. The Tytans, great blind giants of immense power created by the Sartan to manage the power systems of the citadels, were also banished because of fear they could no longer be controlled by the remaining Sartan. The Tytans went on to be an unstoppable terror as they searched for the citadels, trying to get home.

=== Abarrach, the world of stone ===
Finally, and most desperately, Abarrach was a huge volcanic asteroid-like world. The Sartan and mensch lived inside its honeycombed tunnels—designed to provide minerals and metals to the Kicksey-winsey—but they turned out to be loaded with poisonous volcanic fumes. The mensch were wiped out swiftly—the dwarves hung on the longest—and the poisons taxed the magic of the remaining Sartan to create breathable air. Huge columns called Colossi had been created by the Sartan to provide light and keep the world warm in the long run, but they began to fail almost immediately (because they did not receive the necessary energy from Pryan).

With all the mensch dead and Sartan magic stretched to the limit, the Sartan of Abarrach turned to the forbidden arts of necromancy, using the corpses of the dead to supplement a lost workforce. While at the start it seemed a logical (if desperate) move that would help, it proved to be the most critical and tragic mistake of the whole Sartan race, as the dead eventually escaped from Sartan control. But the use of necromancy had an even worse result, one far more disastrous for the Sartan: For every life brought back, every soul prevented from passing on, another life ends untimely. For each dead body resurrected, another member of the species, somewhere, dies. The continuous restoration of dead Sartan on Abarrach resulted in the mass deaths among the Sartan populations of other worlds. Only on Chelestra, apparently due to either the Barrier protecting the Sartan city, or the properties of the water itself, did the Sartan survive relatively unscathed.

=== The Labyrinth ===
In the Labyrinth, the Sartan who should have been monitoring the prison realm either died or left. And without its caretakers, the Labyrinth slowly evolved from a temporary correctional facility into a sadistic and sentient prison. Instead of forcing a hard existence upon the Patryns and teaching them to care for others through relying on one another, it created a lethal, murderous hell where survival was the cruel torture of having hope dangled in your face, only to have it ripped away. Setting out on journeys that lasted generations, the Patryns traveled and fought in nomadic bands or simply alone. They became even more warlike as they fought against incredible odds to push farther and farther towards escape. Though some Patryns did eventually escape, they did so only by climbing on the corpses of those who had come before.

==== Plans of conquest ====
In the end the plan was a total collapse. All of the Sartan on Pryan and Arianus mysteriously died, save one. With no one left to go to their aid, the Sartan on Chelestra (unknowingly protected by their shield, and possibly the nullifying water) never awoke. Abarrach was a pale, dying shadow. In the meantime, the mensch lost all knowledge of their past; the lost Sartan of Arianus and Pryan became mythical god figures to the dwarves, elves and humans of those worlds. This left the imprisoned Patryns as the only ones who still remembered some of their heritage.

After uncounted generations of struggle, Lord Xar became the first Patryn to escape from the Labyrinth. (He was not the first to escape, however. The books later reveal that Zifnab, a Sartan who had been cast into the Labyrinth for challenging the Sundering, apparently reached the Nexus well before him.) There, Lord Xar discovered a wealth of books (written by Zifnab in the Sartan language) that detailed events preceding and following the Sundering. From these, he devised a way to partially open Death's Gate and send through an emissary. Haplo, Lord Xar's favored servant, becomes this emissary; his two missions are to learn what has happened to the Sartan, and to subtly generate chaos among the mensch so that Lord Xar can come and "save" them. It is Xar's intention to rule all the four worlds, and Haplo is his willing servant.

== Races in the series ==
"Some years ago, I was working on a fantasy series called Death Gate with Margaret Weis. We needed two competing systems of magic that made sense. I remembered a saying of my old friend, Jeff Grubb. He defined quantum physics as "figures, figures, figures, figures, figures ... and then God does something ... figures, figures, figures, figures, figures." So, in order to create a believable pair of magic systems, I researched what amounted to Newtonian versus Quantum mechanics and, later, competing visions of quantum theory. I read popular science books regarding Relativity, quantum mechanics, Heisenberg's uncertainty principle, parallel universes and chaos theory. The results were a wonderful and sensible pair of magic systems that made sense because they were modeled on quantum and chaos theories."

— Tracy Hickman, Hickman Newsletter #115

Drawing on these inspirations, Weis and Hickman set up the Patryns and Sartan as opposing pairs in many respects including the magical, and they portrayed the "mensch" races as having lesser (or no) magical abilities. The highest level of magic takes the form of this Patryn and Sartan "rune magic," which alters reality based on possibility and whose operation is influenced by the aforementioned theories. The elves and humans use "physical" and "spiritual" magic of less potency, that operates directly on the world around it.

=== Patryns ===
Patryns are represented as having the same height and build as humans, but the current generations of the series are all in excellent physical shape due to the hardships of the Labyrinth. They are born with brown hair that turns white from the tips up. They are all possessed of excellent magical ability to varying degrees, also a necessity for their survival. All Patryns are capable of using rune magic, which manipulates the Wave of possibilities, allowing Patryns to view a myriad of possible outcomes and select one to occur. The more unlikely the possibility, however, the more difficult to conjure. Patryn use of runes is portrayed as less elegant than Sartan, as it relies more on physical representations such as their tattoos, the use of voice, and drawing the runes in air or on a surface. Patryn runes complement Sartan runes, and can sometimes be used to accomplish the same tasks. Patryns also tend to be loners, but are intensely passionate due to the hardships of the Labyrinth. They will aid one another without question, but generally put their own survival above that of others. Patryns who form groups tend to follow a single ruler, such as the Headman of tribes in the Labyrinth and Xar of the liberated Patryns.

=== Sartan ===
Sartan are also of the same height and build as humans, but unlike the Patryns, they have not been hardened by generations of violent life. Also unlike the Patryns they are born with white hair that turns brown from the tips up. All Sartan are capable of using rune magic. The Sartan use of runes is portrayed as more elegant than the Patryn, involving singing and dancing in prescribed tones and movements to affect the Wave. In some instances, Sartan inscribe runes, mainly to permanently enchant an object or location, such as when creating barred gateways or magical weapons that can then be used by mensch. Sartan runes complement Patryn runes, and can be used to accomplish the same tasks. Sartan tend to act as a community, making decisions as a group rather than as individuals, and they generally have a ruling Council. The Sartan on Abarrach, however, were more fractured due to their hardships. They are presented in contrast to other Sartan as having less magical talent, using much of their strength to survive.

=== Mensch races ===
==== Humans ====
The humans of the series are standard Homo sapiens and are not presented as distinct parallels to existing modern-day nationalities. "Dark-skinned" humans populate Chelestra, while both dark-skinned and fair-skinned humans populate Arianus and Pryan. Humans are of standard height and physical prowess, and a small subset possess magical capability. Human magic is considered part of the Spiritual Masteries, tending towards "the emotional and mental manipulation of the world about the magician." A human of sufficient magical talent can perform a variety of feats, including the manipulation of the elements, creating illusions, healing, compelling other life-forms, transforming shape and size, translocation and overcoming physical limitations such as gravity. While some magicians can mentally construct their magic rather than speaking it, most need to use physical gestures and in some instances physical objects or incantations to perform their magic. The spiritual nature of human magic also ties in with the theme of balance present throughout the series. Humans, especially when compared to elves, are "lacking" in their connection to the natural world and spirituality and their magical skills serve to balance this deficit.

==== Elves ====
Elves are generally taller and more slender than humans and have a greatly extended lifespan. Their longer lives tend to breed a lack of urgency in their outlook, sometimes problematic in dealings with the comparatively impatient humans. Elven magic is considered part of the Physical Masteries, which "tend to use and make use of physical objects in the world about the wizard." For instance, this allows for the creation of "smart" self-targeting arrows, flying dragonships, magical submarines, protective charms against human magics, fabric as hard as steel and other mechanical devices with enhanced capabilities. As with human magic, elven magic is used to balance the elven deficiencies in mechanical, physical, and technical fields. They can also weave magical messages into songs. Elves must both speak and gesture to cast their magic, and the magic contained in songs can be triggered by anyone capable of singing it since the magic is not dependent on a wizard, thus making it possible for humans to trigger elven magic in this form. In Dragon Wing, this explains how humans have been able to use songs to trigger a nostalgia so intense that the elves of Arianus have formed an open rebellion against their ruler.

In contrast, the Kenkari, an isolated group of powerful elven magi on Arianus, also employ a very specialised form of magic based on the spirit which allows them to communicate with the souls of others, living or dead and on one occasion have been shown to change their forms into their order's symbol; the butterfly, which is a glaring exception to the mechanical focus. However, this can possibly be explained by their use of song in these communications, as well as their use of a special box to transport souls and a cathedral designed to contain the captured souls.

==== Dwarves ====
Dwarves are short and stocky compared to the other races, such that humans and elves would have to go down on one knee to converse with a dwarf eye-to-eye. In fact, doing so is considered a mark of respect towards a dwarf. As is typical in portrayals of dwarves, they prefer to live in dark, underground areas, and they also possess an innate sense of direction superior to that of humans or elves. Dwarves have no magical abilities of their own, although certain dwarves of Pryan make very rudimentary use of Sartan magic through triggering its representations in songs and runes carved onto amulets. On Arianus, they are known as "Gegs". On Abarrach, they were known as the Little People, and were the only mensch race durable enough to survive in the harsh conditions of Abarrach for a while.

== Zifnab and related characters ==
The character Zifnab is similar to the character Fizban from Weis and Hickman's Dragonlance novels. Zifnab makes a few references to Fizban during the series (when he's asked for his name he said "Fiz..., no can't use that one", or such as the importance of a Wizard's Hat) and he is described with a similar appearance. He makes references to the Pern series of books, The Lord of the Rings, Dragonlance, Star Wars, Star Trek, James Bond, The Wonderful Wizard of Oz, Arthurian legend, the Space Shuttle Challenger disaster, and soul music; within the context of the books, these are historic references to the former Earth. The character type appears again in a similar capacity in the Starshield novels, where the parallel character is known as Zanfib.

Are Zifnab and Fizban the same person? The simplest (and legal) answer, in Hickman's own words, is always: "The answer is that Fizban is a crazed wizard owned by TSR under copyright, while Zifnab is a completely different crazed wizard owned by Margaret and I. Incidentally, neither Fizban nor Zifnab have any relationship whatsoever to Zanfib—a crazed wizard from our Starshield series. I hope I have cleared this up once and for all."

As to the actual nature of Zifnab within the world of the Death Gate Cycle, Hickman wrote: "Zifnab was actually a Sartan wizard who opposed the council's decision to sunder the world. Zifnab is not a god ... indeed, he is actually a chosen and blessed subject of the dragon-avatars of the Death Gate series."

So why does Zifnab seem, at times, to act just like Fizban? How can he remember Tanis and Raistlin, and why does he nearly call himself Fizban? Hickman: "I like to think that Zifnab is very well read." And so, as far as we know, that is all there is to it: the crazy old wizard was a fan of Dragonlance, as well as, apparently, Tolkien and James Bond. The rest is purely speculation.

Hickman has said that the Zifnab/Fizban/Zanfib character is like him in that they are similarly misunderstood and possessed of great depth, and so the character type continues appearing in his works with Weis. On multiple occasions, Hickman has jokingly suggested that the three characters are distinctly different because they are separately owned and appear in separate series.

"Zifnab," "Fizban," and "Zanfib" are anagrams.

== Language usage ==
The name "Haplo" is said to mean "single" in the Patryn language, and "haplo-" is a Greek root word with the same meaning. Haplo and Marit's daughter is named "Rue", which in English is a verb meaning regret.

The term "mensch" is used by both Sartan and Patryns to refer to humans, elves, and dwarves, both collectively (all three races) and individually (one particular mensch person). Mensch is the German word for "human," but it is used in the books as a derogatory term.

The names "Sartan" and "Patryn" are defined in the books as "Those Who Bring Back Light," and "Those Who Return to Darkness" respectively.

A footnote suggests that the Lord of the Nexus took the name "Xar" from the Russian word tsar, which itself is a corruption of Caesar.

The Patryn city of Abri takes its name from the French word for "shelter".

== Game adaptations ==
Legend Entertainment released a computer adventure game called Death Gate based on the series. The game is based roughly on the first four books, although at the end it also contains an interpretation of the final confrontation from The Seventh Gate.

Frank West created a text-adventure called "The Deadly Labyrinth" which is loosely based on the series and which won honorable mention at the Softworks AGT Competition in 1991.
