= Into the Labyrinth (novel) =

1993 novel by Margaret Weis and Tracy Hickman

- Cover
- Authors: Margaret Weis; Tracy Hickman
- Language: English
- Series: The Death Gate Cycle
- Genre: Fantasy
- Publisher: Bantam Spectra
- Publication date: 1993
- Publication place: United States
- Media type: Print (Paperback
- Pages: 496 (paperback)
- ISBN: 0-553-56771-3
- OCLC: 30564137
- Preceded by: The Hand of Chaos
- Followed by: The Seventh Gate

Into the Labyrinth (1993) is a fantasy novel by American writers Margaret Weis and Tracy Hickman, the sixth book by in their The Death Gate Cycle.

== Plot summary ==
The Seventh Gate is rumored to grant anyone who enters it the power to create and destroy worlds. Haplo is the sole individual who knows the entrance to it, albeit unaware of his own knowledge. However, Haplo finds himself in mortal danger as assassins Hugh and his former lover Marit, both sent by the villainous Lord Xar, pursue him. Meanwhile, old adversaries, the Sartan and Patryn, have once again intersected paths through the power of the Death Gate, igniting the flames of war.

After a series of adventures spanning various locations, including the Labyrinth, Marit sustains injuries, Haplo is abducted by Xar, and Alfred goes missing.

== Reception ==
The book hit the bestseller lists for Waldenbooks and B. Dalton.
