= Bruce Dayton =

American businessman

- Born: August 16, 1918; Minneapolis, Minnesota, U.S.
- Died: November 13, 2015 (aged 97); Orono, Minnesota, U.S.
- Education: Yale University (BA)
- Known for: Establishing the Dayton-Hudson Corporation, CEO of Dayton's, Founder of B. Dalton Bookseller
- Political party: Republican
- Children: Mark Dayton
- Relatives: George Dayton (Grandfather); Douglas Dayton (Brother)
- Military career
- Allegiance: United States
- Branch: United States Army
- Conflicts: World War II

Bruce Bliss Dayton (August 16, 1918 – November 13, 2015) was an American retail executive, businessman, heir to the Dayton's Company fortune, and philanthropist.

Dayton was the last surviving member of the five Dayton brothers – all grandsons of George Dayton, the founder of The Dayton Company – who expanded Dayton's department store founded by their grandfather in downtown Minneapolis from a single location into the national Target Corporation, one of the largest retail store chains in the United States. Dayton served as the chief executive officer (CEO) of the Dayton Hudson Corporation, the company now known as the Target Corporation, before becoming the chairman of Dayton Hudson from 1970 to 1977.

He also founded the B. Dalton Bookseller in 1966. He named the bookstore chain after himself, replacing the Y in his surname with an L. At its height, B. Dalton was the largest retailer of hardcover books in the U.S., with 798 locations. Dayton was the father of Governor and U.S. Senator from Minnesota, Mark Dayton. Dayton was a Republican donor.

== Life and career ==
Dayton was born in Minneapolis, Minnesota, on August 16, 1918, as the second oldest of five brothers. He was the grandson of George Draper Dayton, who had founded the Dayton Company, a Minneapolis department store established in 1902. His mother was the former Grace Bliss, while his father, George Nelson Dayton, was the President and Chairman of Dayton Company. Dayton received a bachelor's degree from Yale University in 1940. He then served in the United States Army during World War II and arrived in France on May 10, 1945, just two days after V-E Day.

He started working at the Dayton Company, the family's retail company, in 1940 in the merchandise receiving room. Dayton became the company's treasurer in 1940. Upon the death of their father George Nelson Dayton in 1950, the five Dayton brothers inherited the Dayton Co., the upscale department store, founded by their grandfather. The brothers opened the first Target in 1962 as a discount retailer. Together, the brothers, would expand both into national retail chains.

In 1967, the Dayton Co. went public with its initial public offering. Bruce Dayton succeeded his brother, Donald Dayton, as Dayton Co.'s president and CEO in 1969. The Dayton Company merged with J.L. Hudson Co., a retail store headquartered in Detroit in 1969, to form the Dayton Hudson Corporation. Bruce Dayton, described as the more "financially-oriented" brother, oversaw the company with a focus on profits and the bottom line.

Bruce Dayton became the Dayton Hudson Corporation's chairman in 1970. His brother, Kenneth N. Dayton, succeeded Bruce Dayton as the company's CEO. In 1975, their Target store chain surpassed Dayton Hudson's more traditional departments stores as the company's top revenue earner. Bruce Dayton left the management of the company in 1977 but remained on the board of directors until 1983.

In 1983, Bruce Dayton and his brother, CEO Kenneth N. Dayton, both retired from the company's board of directors, ending the 80-year day-to-day direct ownership by the Dayton family. The company, which changed its name to the Target Corporation, is no longer owned or operated by the Dayton family.

The Dayton Hudson Corporation sold B. Dalton, the bookstore chain founded by Bruce Dayton, to Barnes & Noble in 1986 for an estimated $275 million.

Bruce Dayton continued his work in philanthropy after stepping down from Dayton Hudson in 1983. He served as a trustee of the Minneapolis Institute of Art (Mia) for 73 years and donated more than $80 million to the museum. In 2009, The New York Times referred to Bruce Dayton as "a dean of American corporate arts philanthropy."

Dayton was married to Ruth Stricker Dayton and had two sons, Governor of Minnesota Mark Dayton and Brandt Dayton, and two daughters, Lucy Dayton and Anne Dayton. He died at his home in Orono, Minnesota, on November 13, 2015, at the age of 97.
