= Fire Sea =

Novel by Margaret Weis and Tracy Hickman

- Cover
- Authors: Margaret Weis; Tracy Hickman
- Cover artist: Keith Parkinson
- Language: English
- Series: The Death Gate Cycle
- Genre: Fantasy
- Publisher: Bantam Spectra
- Publication date: 1991
- Publication place: United States
- Media type: Print (Hardcover and Paperback)
- Pages: 414 (paperback)
- ISBN: 0-553-29541-1
- OCLC: 25400289
- Preceded by: Elven Star
- Followed by: Serpent Mage

Fire Sea is a fantasy novel by American writers Margaret Weis and Tracy Hickman. It is the third book in The Death Gate Cycle series and was released in 1991, The novel explores the realm of Abarrach and the history of the Sartan through the unlikely partnership of Haplo, a Patryn agent sent by Lord Xar to evaluate Abarrach, and Alfred, a Sartan who lost all the others of his race with whom he once lived.

== Plot summary ==
Abarrach, the World of Stone is lava, stone, poisonous fumes, and precious little food that can be grown. The peoples of Abarrach rely on giant rune-inscribed stone pillars called colossi to provide warmth and breathable atmosphere, but the colossi have been failing slowly for many years. The mensch have all died out, and the only remaining people — all of them Sartan — are reduced in power; most of their innate magic is consumed with simply keeping them alive. To bolster their numbers, they have taken to the forbidden art of necromancy: the raising of the dead.

Haplo is sent to this world and discovers, much to his alarm, that Alfred has somehow infiltrated the Nexus and stowed away on his ship. Before he can do anything, however, the vessel passes through Death's Gate, and their consciousnesses switch: the two are forced to relive each other's most painful memories: a seven-year-old Haplo seeing the slaughtered bodies of his parents and being taught that it is all the fault of the Sartan; and Alfred, waking up to find that he is the only Sartan left alive on Arianus and possible all the worlds for all he knows. The experience changes them and they no longer look at them with the same hatred or fear. On Abarrach, Alfred is initially overjoyed to meet living Sartan, even bastardized ones, but is appalled at the state of things; the Sartan rune-language, highly evocative, is laden with images of death when spoken by Abarrach natives. He is even more horrified that they practice necromancy. It was taught that, when one is revived untimely, another dies untimely, and (though the series never spells it out) it is implied that Abarrach's necromancy is the reason most Sartan died during stasis. And the Sartan here regard Alfred with hungry eyes: he has magical abilities that they had long forgotten existed. Even his simplest magic is beyond them, so they now want what he has.

Haplo and Alfred meet Prince Edmund, who is leading his ragged band of people to the "greener" pastures around Abarrach's capital city (Necropolis), and his chief necromancer, Baltazar. In the realm of Kairn Necros, they meet minor nobles and necromancers Jonathan and Jera, just married and very clearly in love with each other. Haplo and Edmund meet with the Dynast Kleitus XIV, who is not a pleasant man; he orders Edmund executed on a whim and imprisons Haplo when it becomes clear that he, too, still knows the secrets of rune-magic. Kleitus poisons Haplo so that the corpse will be left undamaged, the runes free to be studied at Kleitus's leisure. Alfred, Jonathan, and Jera manage to free Haplo, but Jera is killed, and Jonathan revives her immediately without waiting the customary three days to let her soul depart entirely. Jera now becomes a lazar, a revived dead who still retains her intelligence and personality because her soul is so closely bound to the body... and whose existence is endless torment, caught between life and death.

Haplo, Alfred, and Jonathan flee with the dead Edmund and Jera from Kleitus and his dead soldiers, and end up in a curious chamber: heavily warded, full of the skeletal remains of people who apparently killed each other or even themselves, with seven sealed doors spaced evenly around its perimeter and a white wooden table in the middle. It is called the Chamber of the Damned. Once rebels gathered here and were ambushed and killed here by an ancestor of Kleitus, but he and all his forces were struck down by an unseen hand on the very spot. The chamber is entirely peaceful and seems to resist violence, and Alfred (and Haplo too, though he will not admit it) feels for a moment as if in the presence of a Higher Power. While Alfred and Haplo view this ancient scene, Jera is calling to the dead soldiers that Kleitus brings with him. He arrives at the chamber, only to be killed and resurrected as a lazar by Jera. She begins to reanimate many new lazar, culminating in a slaughter of nearly the entire population of the city. The living (and Edmund) are forced to run again, trying to reach Haplo's ship to flee Abarrach, as well as stop the dead from breaking through its runes to enter the other worlds and kill all the living.

Jonathan sacrifices himself to aid their escape, and is murdered and turned into a lazar at his wife's hands; Prince Edmund, on the other hand, demonstrates how a lazar can surrender his/her anger and find true death by doing so. Baltazar gathers his remaining people on the outskirts of the city, in for the long haul, though the new army of lazar will make life difficult. Haplo and Alfred escape in Haplo's ship, and Haplo, driven by odd impulses, gives Alfred a chance to jump ship before he returns to the Nexus and his lord.

Haplo's report to Xar is minimal, he tells his lord that Abarrach may be removed from his calculations since it is a dead world. The novel, however, contains a Xar's written response in the margin of the report, where he calls Haplo a liar.

== Characters ==
- Haplo: A Patryn agent sent to explore Abarrach by Lord Xar as part of his plans to conquer the elemental worlds.
- Alfred: A Sartan who becomes friends with Haplo as they discover the secrets of Abarrach.
- Prince Edmund: The son of the king of the Sartan. He seeks to lead his people out of Kairn Telest and into one of the inner cities. After being driven to desperation, Edmund and Balthazar turn to the forbidden art of necromancy in an attempt to help the Sartan recover.
- Balthazar: The Sartan king's advisor and chief necromancer who sympathizes more with Prince Edmund than with the king. He performs necromancy.
- Kleitus XIV: The dynast of the city of Necropolis. He wants to find Death's Gate due to a prophecy connected with the place.
- Jonathon: Married to Jera. When his wife is killed, he accidentally turns her into a lazar, a cadaver whose soul slips in and out of its host. He later willingly becomes a lazar himself.
- Jera: Married to Jonathon. She becomes a lazar after her husband incorrectly attempts to resurrect her when she dies saving his life.

== Reception ==
The book hit the bestseller lists for Locus, Waldenbooks, and B. Dalton.

Fire Sea reached the 15th position on The New York Times bestseller list on August 4, 1991.
