= Amber and Blood =

2008 Dragonlance novel by Margaret Weis

- Cover
- Author: Margaret Weis
- Language: English
- Series: Dark Disciple
- Genre: Fantasy novel
- Publisher: TSR, Inc.
- Publication date: May 2008 Hardcover / November 2008 Paperback
- Publication place: United States
- Media type: Print (Paperback)
- ISBN: 0-7869-5001-3
- Preceded by: Amber and Iron

Amber and Blood is the third novel in the Dark Disciple series by Margaret Weis.

== Publication history ==
Amber and Blood was written by Margaret Weis and published in May 2008. The first two novels in the series are Amber and Ashes and Amber and Iron.

== Plot introduction ==
The story resumes where Amber and Iron ended. The monk Rhys and the kender Nightshade, along with Rhys's dog Atta, find themselves in a cave on the coast of the Blood Sea while a ferocious storm rages outside. Thinking their adventure finally over, the two companions discuss what to do next when they hear yelling from outside the cave. Rhys runs outside and sees a young girl struggling in the water. He rescues her and brings her ashore, only to realize that the six-year-old girl has the same red hair and amber eyes as Mina.

== Plot summary ==
Mina, who had last appeared to Rhys as an adult woman, seems to retain no knowledge of her prior actions or that she is a god. She tells the monk that she has run away from home and needs his help to go back. When asked where she lived, the young Mina replies that she came from Godshome, the holy valley of the gods first introduced in Dragons of Spring Dawning.

After Mina fully recovers from near drowning, she insists that she needs a gift for her mother Goldmoon who will be waiting at Godshome and whose forgiveness Mina seeks. A small sailboat appears on the beach, although Mina seems unaware she willed it into existence. Rhys, Nightshade, Atta and Mina sail to the newly raised Tower of High Sorcery, which sits on its own island in the sea. As the group sail closer, they realize the island is swarming with undead creatures known as the Beloved. They all swarm around Mina and her escorts, eager for her touch and her blessings, terrifying the six-year-old.

The group makes its way inside the tower where the Beloved cannot follow. Also in the tower are two black-robed wizards who are trapped by the Beloved. Mina is still intent on finding a gift for her mother and travels to the chamber where holy artifacts of the gods were stored before the Cataclysm, the so-called Hall of Sacrilege. She chooses two items from within: a necklace from the altar of Takhisis and a crystal pyramid from the altar of Paladine.

When Mina and her friends try to leave the tower, she is beset by the Beloved again. Faced with the evil she has created, Mina transforms into a vengeful, fire-breathing giant and destroys the Beloved in a rage, only to transform into a child again with seemingly no memory of what happened. Meanwhile, the evil gods Nuitari and Chemosh try to claim the artifacts in the Hall of Sacrilege for themselves, but the High God, creator of all the gods of Krynn, intervenes and sweeps away the Hall so none of the artifacts can be used in the fight between the lower gods.

Rhys and his companions sail to the port city of Flotsam, from where they will continue to try to find Godshome on foot. On the road, both the god of death Chemosh and goddess of the sea Zeboim try to sway Mina to their cause, but she does not remember or trust either of them. Frustrated, they depart. Mina asks to see the map Nightshade has made for their journey and is upset by how far they still have to go before reaching Solace, where Rhys hopes to speak with monks of Majere. Using her godly powers, she speeds up the pace of their walking and the group reaches the city of Solace, far across the continent, in under a day.

In Solace, Rhys and the others stay at the Inn of the Last Home where the owner Laura dotes on the young Mina, bathing her and brushing her hair just as Goldmoon used to do. Rhys finds the temple to his god Majere among the other temples in town and seeks out the Abbott of Majere. Temple Row, where the holy places are all located, is in an uproar as rival followers fought in the streets and attempted to set fire to one another's temples. Rhys speaks to the Abbott about finding Godshome. The Abbott counsels him that legend has it that Godshome is located near Neraka, formerly the seat of Takhisis's armies. Neither knows whether mortals can find Godshome without the guidance of a god. Rhys thinks Valthonis, the mortal form of the former god Paladine, could help locate Godshome but the Abbott reminds him that after the War of Souls, Mina had vowed to kill Valthonis. Rhys leaves unsure about whether to seek out the fallen god.

The next day, Rhys meets Mina, Nightshade and Atta at the temple of Majere, from where they will journey to Neraka. Another riot among the religious temples is carefully orchestrated by Chemosh's followers. Ausric Krell, the former death knight who has been restored to human form, uses the confusion to try to kill Rhys and Nightshade and to abduct Mina for his god. He almost succeeds but Rhys, along with the help of the red-robed archmage Jenna, manages to kill him. Mina, meanwhile, has fled, with Nightshade and Atta in pursuit.

Nightshade and Atta catch up with Mina and head north, continuing toward Neraka. Rhys helps deal with the wounded and explains to the sheriff Gerard what has happened with Mina. Gerard's leg is wounded and as he is treated in the Inn of the Last Home, Rhys waits for word about Mina. Soon enough, he hears they travelled north and follows.

Nightshade and Mina travel until it gets dark, at which point the forest frightens them. A light in the distance leads them to a lone house in the woods. A kind woman welcomes them inside and feeds them gingerbread, after which they both fall asleep. Rhys comes upon the same house and finds the woman gently rocking Mina, looking very sad. She invites Rhys in as well and he recognizes her as the goddess of healing Mishakal, Mina's godly mother. She again counsels Rhys to seek out Valthonis, for Paladine was Mina's father, and that he alone can reveal Godshome to her. Mishakal tells Rhys that Mina will have to choose whether to side with the gods of Good or the gods of Evil.

The next day, Rhys, Nightshade, Atta and Mina awake to find themselves in Neraka, surrounded by remnants of the destroyed temple of Takhisis. Meanwhile, Galdar, Mina's former minotaur lieutenant, escorts Valthonis into the valley of Neraka. When Mina sees Galdar, she changes into the 17-year-old woman who had led armies during the War of Souls and embraces her minotaur friend. She believes the two of them are still fighting in that war before, remembering Takhisis' death, she tries to kill Valthonis with Galdar's sword. He and Rhys explain that if she commits this murder, she will tip the balance in favour of the Evil gods and destroy Krynn. She is enraged and shifts her form again, this time to the person who had led Chemosh's followers. She beats Galdar and Rhys with godly force and kills Nightshade. At the kender's death, she becomes the little girl with pigtails again and feels remorse for his death. Finally, she accepts who she is and agrees to travel with Valthonis to Godshome.

Mina and Valthonis find Godshome after following a steep trail through the mountains. Mina's feet hurt and she is confused by why she feels pain despite being a god. She accepts that though the gods "play at being mortal" none truly know what mortality is like except for her. The two finally enter the bowl-shaped valley that houses pillars to all the gods of Good, Evil and Balance. She holds the two artifacts she retrieved from the Hall of Sacrilege in each hand as the gods wait for her to decide. She drops both items and proclaims that she is "equal parts of darkness and of light" and refuses to join any side, that she will side with any one side as she sees fit. Her decision maintains the balance of power and she leaves the world to join the gods as the Goddess of Tears, coming to the aid of the hopeless and the grieving.
