= The Seventh Gate (Weis and Hickman novel) =

1994 novel by Margaret Weis and Tracy Hickman

- Cover
- Authors: Margaret Weis; Tracy Hickman
- Language: English
- Series: The Death Gate Cycle
- Genre: Fantasy
- Publisher: Bantam Spectra
- Publication date: 1994
- Publication place: United States
- Media type: Print (Hardcover and Paperback)
- Pages: 368 (paperback)
- ISBN: 0-553-57325-X
- OCLC: 33290122
- Preceded by: Into the Labyrinth
- Followed by: none

The Seventh Gate (1994) is a fantasy novel by American writers Margaret Weis and Tracy Hickman, the seventh and final book in their Death Gate Cycle series.

== Plot summary ==
Alfred, Haplo, and Marit journey to attempt to close the Chamber of the Damned on Abarrach—it is the Seventh Gate, a portal between worlds. Encountering magical enemies such as dragon-snakes, as the story progresses they battle ferociously. Eventually, they realise that the only way to seal the gate is to work a powerful, peaceful spell together, Sartan with Patryn. At length, this succeeds—the gate is sealed, and there is some hope of peace. The Patryns and Sartan remain living together in the Labyrinth.

== Reception ==
The book hit the bestseller lists for Waldenbooks and B. Dalton.

The Seventh Gate reached 14 on the New York Times bestseller list on August 28, 1994.
