= When Black Roses Bloom =

Dungeons & Dragons adventure module

- Character levels: 4-6
- First published: 1995

When Black Roses Bloom is an adventure module for the 2nd edition of the Advanced Dungeons & Dragons fantasy role-playing game, published in 1995.

== Plot summary ==
When Black Roses Bloom is a Ravenloft adventure which guest stars Lord Soth, the tormented and terrifying death knight of Solamnia, from the Dragonlance setting. Trapped in the Demiplane of Dread, the homesick Soth longs to return to Krynn, and has fashioned six memory mirrors to help him get there.

== Publication history ==
When Black Roses Bloom was written by Lisa Smedman, and published by TSR, Inc.

== Reception ==
Rick Swan reviewed When Black Roses Bloom for Dragon magazine #221 (September 1995). He calls the adventure "engaging", and states: "The principal encounters, which take place inside the mirrors, not only challenge the party's tactical skills, but also reveal tantalizing bits of the Dragonlance mythos."
