= Amber and Ashes =

2004 novel by Margaret Weis

- Cover of Amber and Ashes, Volume One of the Dark Disciples Trilogy
- Author: Margaret Weis
- Language: English
- Series: Dark Disciple Trilogy, Dragonlance book series
- Genre: Fantasy novel
- Published: August, 2004 (hardcover); June, 2005 (mass market paperback); Random House
- Publication place: United States
- Media type: Print (Hardcover, Paperback)
- Pages: 384 pp
- ISBN: 0-7869-3257-0 (hardcover); ISBN 0-7869-3742-4 (mass market paperback)
- OCLC: 56391059
- Dewey Decimal: 813/.54 22
- LC Class: PS3573.E3978 A83 2004
- Followed by: Amber and Iron

Amber and Ashes is a fiction, fantasy novel in the Dragonlance book series and is the first of a trilogy called "The Dark Disciple", based around the character Mina. The book takes up where the War of Souls left off. This trilogy will explore the Chaos that is post-war Krynn. It is authored by Margaret Weis, who was a co-founder of the Dragonlance series, along with Tracy Hickman. This is Weis's fourteenth novel in the series, and first solo hardcover since the publication of the extremely popular Dragonlance title The Soulforge in 1998.

== Publication history ==
Amber and Ashes was written by Margaret Weis and published in July 2005. Other books in the series include Amber and Iron (Volume 2) and Amber and Blood (Volume 3).

== Plot introduction ==
Amber and Ashes is set in Krynn shortly after the death of Takhisis at the end of the War of Souls. Magic is back, and so are the gods. But the gods are vying for supremacy, and the war has caused widespread misery, uprooting entire nations and changing the balance of power on Ansalon.

The mysterious warrior-woman Mina, brooding on her failure and the loss of her goddess, makes a pact with evil in a seductive guise. As a strange vampiric cult spreads throughout the fragile world, unlikely heroes—a wayward monk and a kender who can communicate with the dead—join forces to try to uproot the cause of the growing evil.

It begins with Chemosh talking to himself in an abandoned temple about his plans to rule the pantheon and obtaining living servants as opposed to the dead. Shortly after, Mina and Galdar are seen. Mina is grieving the death of Takhisis and is about to kill herself when Chemosh intervenes and makes her his lover. It is then that the plot to create the Beloved of Chemosh begins.

== Characters ==
- Rhys Mason - Rhys Mason was a monk of Majere, who has lived his life in an isolated monastery. Rhys's brother, Lleu, a Beloved of Chemosh, is brought by Rhys's parents to the monastery in the hopes that the monks will help set Lleu back on the righteous path. Instead, Lleu poisons all of the monks and his parents during dinner. The only person not poisoned is Rhys, because he does not go to the meal but is outside meditating. Rhys discovers the deaths and is appalled that Majere allowed his worshippers to be killed without lending aid. Rhys is approached by the goddess Zeboim in her attempt to thwart the plans of Chemosh. Rhys agrees to follow her, but never seems to fully embrace her as his god.
- Atta - Rhys's closest companion is his dog, Atta, who he trained to shepherd sheep while at the monastery. He noticed that Atta was able to tell that something was not right about Lleu at the monastery. Now, with the assistance of the kender Nightshade, who is able to speak to the dead, the three are searching for Rhys's brother and Mina, the High Priestess of Chemosh. Atta proves to be as skilled a kender herder as she was with sheep.
- Lleu Mason - Lleu was a cleric of Kiri-Jolith who is seduced by Mina, the High Priestess of Chemosh. Lleu agrees to worship Chemosh and becomes the first of the Beloved of Chemosh. After killing the monks at the Majere monastery, Lleu is pursued by Rhys, Atta and Nightshade.
- Nightshade - Nightshade is a kender nightstalker. As a nightstalker, Nightshade has the ability to speak with the dead as well as cast certain, mystical spells. He is not the normal kender, often not following the common kender instincts to seek adventure or “borrow” from others - although he is kept in line by Atta, who is acts as his “sheep dog.”
- Mina - High Priestess of Chemosh, she was originally introduced in the War of Souls trilogy, where she led the armies of the One God (now known to be the goddess Takhisis). After Mina buries Takhisis under a mountain, she starts to feel that her life is useless and contemplated suicide. Galdar, a minotaur and her second-in-command during the War of Souls, tries to comfort her, but soon Sargonnas comes and transports Galdar back to the minotaur homeland to help fight against the elves. Soon, Chemosh comes for her, and she expects to die. However, Chemosh didn't come for her death, but for her life. Soon she is entranced by the handsome Chemosh, and agrees to become his High Priestess. She goes around the world converting people to Chemosh.
- Chemosh - the god of death, is the driving immortal force behind the events in Amber and Ashes. Growing tired of being worshiped by the elderly and decrepit, Chemosh concocts a plan to draw younger, attractive worshipers to him. He uses Mina to gain converts by giving her the power to grant all those who declare their loyalty to him, unending life and youth. These undying worshipers are called the Beloved of Chemosh. A Beloved of Chemosh is really a dead person who doesn't realize that they are dead. Instead, they travel through the world, unable to be killed, and looking to create more Beloveds.
  - Krell - Ausric Krell was a Knight of Takhisis serving under the late Dragon Highlord Ariakan. Historically, Krell is known, as the Betrayer for the hand that he played in Ariakan's death. As punishment, Zeboim, Ariakan's mother, imprisoned him on Storm's Keep, a former island stronghold for the Knights of Takhisis during the Chaos Wars. There she repeatedly tortured and killed the knight, eventually turning him into a death knight. He is rescued by Mina, who tricks Zeboim and forces him to work for Chemosh.
- Zeboim - A god of darkness, who has control over the sea, Zeboim forces Rhys to serve her, after Rhys feels that Majere has abandoned him and his fellow monks.
- Majere - A god of light, also known as the Mantis God, Majere is the god that Rhys used to worship before Rhys forsook him.
- Beloved of Chemosh - A new vampire-like 'race' created to spread the worship of Chemosh to the young and beautiful. Seducing the living with promises of immortality and invincibility, these undead kill by kissing the heart of their victims. They appear as the living, breathing, eating, drinking, etc., but are mere shells of their former selves. Over time they lose their identities, becoming nearly invincible and insatiable killers, filled only with the desire to spread their curse.

== Related Information ==
The Dark Disciple Trilogy

1. Amber and Ashes (2004)
2. Amber and Iron (2006)
3. Amber and Blood (2008)

== See also ==
- List of Dragonlance novels
- Dragonlance
- Margaret Weis
