= Lord Soth =

Dragonlance character

- Dragonlance character
- Lord Soth, the Knight of the Black Rose
- First appearance: Dragons of Spring Dawning
- Created by: Margaret Weis and Tracy Hickman

In-universe information
- Alias: Knight of the Black Rose
- Race: Civilized human
- Gender: Male
- Title: Lord Soth of Dargaard Keep
- Alignment: Lawful evil
- Home: Solamnia

Lord Soth, the Knight of the Black Rose, is a fictional character appearing in the fantasy realms of Dragonlance and later Ravenloft. He is depicted as a death knight and fallen Knight of Solamnia from the world of Krynn.

== Development ==
According to Tracy Hickman, he needed a powerful character for the Heroes of the Lance to fight at the High Clerist's Tower, and Lord Soth suddenly came into his mind with a complete history and personality. The popularity of Lord Soth as a character has defined what a death knight means to the writers of the Dungeons & Dragons game over the years. Soth was also named as one of the greatest villains in D&D history in the final print issue of Dragon.

=== Debate ===
Soth's tenure in Ravenloft is a topic of debate. After Soth died in World of Krynn (1988), the character "then made the jump to Ravenloft: Realm of Terror, and was quickly lined up as the star of the second Ravenloft novel. The original writer for the novel fell through. Tracy Hickman was offered a shot at the novel and declined because he and TSR were on the outs at the time. Other authors wrote proposals, but they all suggested significant changes to Soth's character, which Ravenloft fiction line editor Jim Lowder refused, because he wanted to be able to hand Soth back to Krynn intact when Ravenloft was done with him. In the end, James Lowder himself was commissioned to write Knight of the Black Rose (1991), which more fully introduced Soth to the demiplane of Ravenloft". In this book, the Mists of Ravenloft plucked Soth and Caradoc from Krynn while the two battled and eventually Soth was given the domain Sithicus.

By Soth's third appearance in Ravenloft, in the adventure When Black Roses Bloom (1995), the character had become "a bit of a political hot potato. Tracy Hickman and Margaret Weis had returned to the company to write new Dragonlance novels, and they were unhappy with Soth's use in Ravenloft. Reports say that as far as they were concerned, Soth had never gone to Ravenloft, and he even appeared in a cameo in Dragons of Summer Flame (1995) … which just confused the matter — though Wizards of the Coast has made it clear that Soth's sojourn to Ravenloft is a canon part of D&D lore". Soth had one more Ravenloft focused novel, Spectre of the Black Rose (1999) by Lowder and Voronica Whitney-Robinson, which returned Soth to the Dragonlance setting as the Hickmans wanted.

Wizards of the Coast has been vague on the subject but the last official word was that Soth did indeed enter Ravenloft but that the Mists returned him to Krynn at the very instant he was removed. While Lowder had additional unpublished fiction about Soth and the domain of Sithicus, a short story and a third novel, Wizards of the Coast cancelled the Ravenloft fiction line. Lowder then pitched it to White Wolf in the 3rd Edition era (2001-2005), however, that didn't pan out. Soth was killed off by the Hickmans in the novel Dragons of a Vanished Moon (2002).

It is also mentioned in an article in Dragon #351 that the new dark lord of Sithicus is plagued by a mockery of Lord Soth. This "White Knight" version of Soth shows how anyone can be redeemed and is an anathema to that Dark Lord's corrupting influence on the land.

Wes Schneider, lead designer Van Richten's Guide to Ravenloft (2021), confirmed that Soth is not included in the 5th Edition sourcebook to respect the canon history of the character. However, the sourcebook contains "several references and some easter eggs" to the character.

== Fictional attributes ==
Soth stands 6'5" or taller, wearing a full suit of Solamnic plate mail of ancient design. Damage from many battles mars the delicate ornamentation on his armor, obscuring its intricate carvings of kingfishers and roses, leaving only a charred black rose on the breastplate, which became Soth's symbol. A long purple cloak hangs heavily on his shoulders, draped behind him almost to his knees. A tassel of long black hair tops his helm, as worn and ancient as the rest of his armor. A sword black with the blood of countless victims hangs sheathed on his hip. Of the death knight himself, only two flaming dots red as blood shine from the eye slits on the helm. His voice seems an echo from the depth of a bottomless cavern. Like all death knights, there is always an aura of freezing unearthly cold around Soth, the demeanor so terrifying that even kender have been known to be frightened.

Under his armor, he is a corpse of some sort, with very dark gray to almost black skin, when he pulls off one of his gauntlets, and also when he was able to take off his helmet and drink the water from the lake of Sounds, in the novel Spectre of the Black Rose.

When traveling, Soth is usually mounted on a nightmare, a demonic steed with ebony skin and flaming hooves.

=== Combat ===
Although evil and filled with an intense hatred for all living creatures, most of the time Soth retains a semblance of the pride he held as a Solamnic knight, and fights honorably. He will never ambush an opponent from behind, nor does he strike before his enemy can ready his weapon. Aside from these facts, however, Soth is a terrible enemy. An undead abomination, Soth has inhuman strength, which is further enhanced by his skill with the sword; something that he learned as a former Knight of the Rose. Soth also can cast various type of spells, including huge fireballs, magical words which stun or kill enemies, ice walls, cone of cold, etc. With a single word, Soth can snuff the life out of a red dragon (thus Power Word: Kill), or shatter the great city gate of Palanthas, which was formerly known as the "Unconquered City".

== Fictional character biography ==
=== Life as a knight ===
Soth was a Knight of the Rose, the most esteemed rank of knight in the Knights of Solamnia, and married. While on a trip he encountered a band of ogres attacking elven priestesses; Soth fell in love with the fairest priestess, the Silvanesti elf Isolde Denissa, and eventually managed to seduce her, bringing her back to Dargaard Keep as a friend in the eyes of both the public and his wife. Soth's wife Korrine and her lady-in-waiting then visited a witch to help her conceive a child; the witch agreed, but warned that the child would be a representation of Soth's soul. Korrine eventually gave birth to an abomination, and Soth, thinking his wife consorted with some kind of demon, killed her and their child. Korrine's lady-in-waiting revealed to Soth's superior that Isolde was pregnant with his bastard child and he was brought before the Court of High Justice at Palanthas. Soth's lie about his wife and child passing in childbirth was corroborated by Istvan the healer, who was later compelled by the court to tell the truth about Soth's crime. Before he could be executed, Soth escaped back to Dargaard Keep.

=== Undead curse ===
Besieged by the other knights, Soth's mood turned black, and he even struck his new wife, Isolde, on one occasion. When he realized what he had become, he prayed to Paladine and his wife prayed to Mishakal. Mishakal showed her the future and the destruction that the arrogant Kingpriest of Istar was about to call upon Krynn. She was told that Soth could stop the Cataclysm, but he would die in the attempt. Isolde told Soth about her vision and he set out to redeem himself. On the way to Istar he encountered a group of three elf-maids. They poisoned Soth's mind with lies about his wife's infidelity. Enraged, Soth turned from his quest and confronted his wife just as the Cataclysm began. A chandelier fell upon his wife and newborn son, setting her aflame. His wife begged for him to save their child, but Soth stopped himself from doing so, to prevent his own son from growing up as he had. As her life ended she cursed him, saying "you shall live the lifetime of every soul that you have caused death today", and upon pronunciation of the curse the fire engulfed the entire keep, seemingly slaying Soth, his retainers, and the rest of the keep's inhabitants. Soth became a death knight and his followers became skeleton warriors. The three elf-maids became banshees, cursed to remind him of his folly every night.

=== War of the Lance ===
Several centuries later, the evil goddess Takhisis launched the War of the Lance to conquer Krynn and wanted Lord Soth to assist her armies. Soth informed Takhisis he would only be willing to serve the Dragon Highlord (Takhisis's top generals) with enough courage and strength to survive one night in Dargaard Keep. Only the Dragon Highlord known as the Blue Lady, Kitiara Uth Matar, accepted this challenge. Kitiara survived the night, winning Soth's service.

Lord Soth would soon prove an invaluable ally to Kitiara. It was Soth that prevented Emperor Ariakas from executing Kitiara for the defeats she suffered in the Vingaard Campaign, and it was Soth who effected the successful kidnapping of Laurana, the Golden General of the Good Armies (who also happened to be Kitiara's romantic rival for the heart of Tanis Half-Elven.)

Soth became obsessed with Laurana, whose radiant elven beauty reminded him so much of Isolde, so he entered into a conspiracy with Kitiara where he would help her obtain the Crown of Power from Ariakas in exchange for her having Takhisis grant him the soul of Laurana, who would then suffer in undeath with him for all eternity. Thus at the Council of Highlords in Neraka, Soth personally carried the captive Laurana, who had been tightly wrapped into a cocoon of winding cloth, to Kitiara. The Dragon Highlord then cut Laurana out of the cocoon, offered her up as a gift to Takhisis and received Takhisis's blessing for the elfmaid's soul to be granted to Lord Soth.

However, Soth's desire would be frustrated when Tanis Half-Elven assassinated Emperor Ariakas and then Laurana escaped as the Dragonarmies began fighting amongst themselves. Soth eliminated the Green and Black Dragon Highlords, Kitiara's potential rivals for the Crown of Power, during this fighting but failed to obtain Laurana's soul, as Kitiara allowed Tanis and Laurana to escape. Soth mocked Kitiara for this apparent act of mercy, but Kitiara then told the death knight she did it only so she would always live in Tanis' heart, which would forever taint his relationship with Laurana. Soth accepted this answer and then presented Kitiara with the Crown of Power while vowing his undying service to her.

=== Blue Lady's War ===
Several years after the end of the War of the Lance, Lord Soth would again assist Kitiara during the Blue Lady's War. Under his command, a great number of undead creatures (including his skeletal warriors and banshees with wyvern-carried chariots) breached Palanthas the Unconquered City. However, Soth had his own motivations. He had become completely obsessed with Kitiara (whose self-serving nature and survival-instinct had somehow rekindled his undead heart), and decided to make her become his eternal consort. Thus Soth waited until the dark elf wizard, Dalamar, struck Kitiara down during the fighting and then claimed Kitiara's body. Once Soth had Kitiara's body, he had his forces withdraw from Palanthas. Without their undead allies, the rest of Kitiara's forces were soon defeated by the Palanthians. However, due to the treachery of one of Soth's servants, Caradoc, his plan to obtain Kitiara's soul failed. The role-playing video game Death Knights of Krynn, in which Soth was featured, also happened during this era.

=== Ravenloft ===
The Mists of Ravenloft plucked Soth and Caradoc from Krynn while the two battled. His soul was brought to the domain of Barovia; wanting to return to Krynn, Soth sought out Strahd von Zarovich, the ruler of the domain, in the hope Strahd would help him. Strahd tried to use Soth to his advantage but this only cost him a red dragon which was one of his castle guardians. After a series of adventures with the Vistani girl, Magda, and the were-badger Azrael Dak, Soth had found out that Strahd was hiding Caradoc from him. Soth attacked Strahd unceasingly and the vampire had no choice but to release Caradoc in order to keep his domain in one piece. Soth then pursued Caradoc until he finally caught him at the edge of the mists.

Soth was then given the domain Sithicus ("land of spectres" in the elven tongue) in Ravenloft by the Mists after he exacted his vengeance on Caradoc's ghost. His new castle, Nedragaard Keep (Solamnic, meaning: "not Dargaard"), was made as mockery of Dargaard in Krynn with a continually changing form so Soth could not maintain the military order he was accustomed to. During the Grand Conjunction he briefly returned to his Krynn body.

Soth's experiences in Sithicus had changed him only slightly. Throughout his time in the Dread Realm, Soth found himself entering mirror worlds, each which contained a portion of his past. Through these he lived in worlds of fantasy, ignoring the world beyond his keep. It is believed that his refusal to face his past sins and his willingness to suffer his curse led to his release from the Mists; Soth simply withdrew and ignored Sithicus until he was released.

The story of his ascension is told in Knight of the Black Rose, the story of his temporary release is told in World of Krynn, and the story of his final release is told in Spectre of the Black Rose.

=== War of Souls ===
In the 2002 book Dragon of a Vanished Moon, upon his return to Krynn, Mina, Chosen of Takhisis, attempted to recruit Soth to lead the Dark Queen's armies. Soth had dwelt too long in solitude. This was time enough for him to come to peace with himself; to know how he had wronged his wife and child. He refused the goddess' invitation. In retaliation for this insult, Takhisis ironically delivered Lord Soth one final blessing: she restored his mortality. The Dark Queen then destroyed his keep, crushing him to death beneath its rubble. The fallen knight perished with a measure of his honor restored, vowing that he would forever search for the elf maid and his son in the afterlife. He hoped, that in this search, he would be redeemed.

== Reception ==
Lauren Davis of io9 commented that "Lord Soth is one of those great, classically styled villains. The undead man in a suit of armor is nothing new, but Soth is played to nicely creepy effect, and he comes with a horrific backstory straight out of a dark fairytale, one filled with wife murder and lost honor. That he's not even the main villain of the piece speaks to Weis and Hickman's ability to balance a host of powerful and terrible characters."

Lord Soth was #10 on Game Rant's 2020 "10 Must-Have NPCs In Dungeons & Dragons Lore To Make Your Campaigns Awesome" list — the article states that "As an NPC, Lord Soth can prove to be a formidable opponent against an adventuring party. Lord Soth not only has a skeletal army serving him, he can also simply point at living thing and kill them by uttering "Die.""

Lord Soth appeared on the 2018 Screen Rant top list at #12 on "Dungeons & Dragons: The 15 Most Powerful Villains, Ranked", and Scott Baird highlighted that "Lord Soth was a death knight from the Dragonlance setting, who later became one of the Darklords of Ravenloft, before returning to his homeland."

== Other media ==
=== Video games ===
Lord Soth was the main antagonist in Death Knights of Krynn. In a review of the game in Computer Gaming World, Soth is described as a "necrophiliac" who enjoys nothing as much as "animating some hapless corpse and sending it out to wreak grave consequences on the world."

Lord Soth also appears as a non-playable character in the video game Iron & Blood: Warriors of Ravenloft.

== Sources ==
- Weis, Margaret; Hickman, Tracy (2000). Dragons of Autumn Twilight: Chronicles vol. I. Wizards of the Coast. ISBN 0-7869-1574-9.
- Weis, Margaret; Hickman, Tracy (2000). Dragons of Winter Night: Chronicles vol. II. Wizards of the Coast. ISBN 0-7869-1609-5.
- Weis, Margaret; Hickman, Tracy (2000). Dragons of Spring Dawning: Chronicles vol. III. Wizards of the Coast. ISBN 0-7869-1589-7.
- Weis, Margaret; Hickman, Tracy (2000). Time of the Twins: Legends vol. I. Wizards of the Coast. ISBN 0-7869-1804-7.
- Weis, Margaret; Hickman, Tracy (2000). War of the Twins: Legends vol. II. Wizards of the Coast. ISBN 0-7869-1805-5.
- Weis, Margaret; Hickman, Tracy (2000). Test of the Twins: Legends vol. III. Wizards of the Coast. ISBN 0-7869-1806-3.
- Weis, Margaret; Hickman, Tracy (2002). Dragons of a Lost Star: The War of Souls vol. II. Wizards of the Coast. ISBN 0-7869-2706-2.
- Weis, Margaret; Hickman, Tracy (2003). Dragons of a Vanished Moon: The War of Souls vol. III. Wizards of the Coast. ISBN 0-7869-2950-2.
- Several (2003). The Cataclysm: Tales vol. V. Wizards of the Coast. ISBN 1-56076-430-9.
- van Belkom, Edo (2004). Lord Soth: The Warriors vol. VI. Wizards of the Coast. ISBN 0-7869-0519-0.
- Lowder, James; Whitney-Robinson, Voronica (1999). Spectre of the Black Rose (Ravenloft). ISBN 0-7869-1333-9.
- Michael Gray. (1988). "Dargaard Keep": World of Krynn. Wizards of the Coast.
