= Darksword =

Role-playing game books (1987–1998)

- Forging the Darksword (1987); Doom of the Darksword (1988); Triumph of the Darksword (1988); Legacy of the Darksword (1998)
- Author: Margaret Weis and Tracy Hickman
- Cover artist: Larry Elmore
- Country: United States
- Language: English
- Genre: Fantasy, Role-playing game
- Publisher: Bantam Books; Random House
- Published: 1987—1988, 1998
- Media type: Print
- No. of books: 4
- Preceded by: Dragonlance Chronicles
- Website: penguinrandomhouse.com

The Darksword series consists of the initial three books of The Darksword Trilogy, a supplemental role-playing volume, and a single-volume sequel. It was written by Margaret Weis and Tracy Hickman with cover art by Larry Elmore. It is the story of a young man, born without magic in a society where magic is life, who has been prophesied to destroy the world. The books are published by Bantam Spectra, the science fiction division of Random House. Each book of the trilogy reached the New York Times best seller list.

== Overview ==
The Darksword Trilogy consists of Forging the Darksword (December 1, 1987), Doom of the Darksword (May 1988), and Triumph of the Darksword (September 1988). A fourth book is a sequel, Legacy of the Darksword (June 1998). The role-playing game is Darksword Adventures (December 1988).

== Reception ==
Forging the Darksword reached 15 on the New York Times bestseller list on December 27, 1987.

Doom of the Darksword reached 9 on the New York Times bestseller list on May 1, 1988.

Triumph of the Darksword reached 12 on the New York Times bestseller list on August 21, 1988.
