= Amber and Iron =

2006 novel by Margaret Weis

- Author: Margaret Weis
- Cover artist: Matthew Stawiki
- Language: English
- Series: Dark Disciple Trilogy, Dragonlance book series
- Genre: Fantasy novel
- Publisher: Random House
- Publication date: February 1, 2006
- Publication place: United States
- Media type: Print (Hardback & Paperback)
- Pages: 376 pp (first edition, hardback)
- ISBN: 0-7869-3796-3 (first edition, hardback)
- OCLC: 63207937
- Dewey Decimal: 813/.6 22
- LC Class: PS3573.E3978 A85 2006
- Preceded by: Amber and Ashes (2004)
- Followed by: Amber and Blood

Amber and Iron is a fantasy novel in the Dragonlance book series by Margaret Weis, co-creator of the world of Dragonlance, and is the second of a trilogy based around the character Mina. It is the fifteenth novel in the series.

== Publication history ==
Amber and Iron was written by Margaret Weis and published in November 2006. Other books in the series include Amber and Ashes (Volume 1) and Amber and Blood (Volume 3).

== Plot introduction ==
The novel begins with where Amber and Ashes leaves off. Former Majere monk Rhys Mason is trying to escape the clutches of the death knight Auseric Krell after Rhys has the kender Nightshade, in the guise of a Khas piece, recover the imprisoned soul of Ariakan for his mother, the god Zeboim.

Mina, as enigmatic as ever, escapes imprisonment to set off on a quest that will test even her considerable will. All the while, evil spreads across the land, gaining ground with each new day. With so much at stake, with the very soul of Krynn on the line, champions must be found even in the darkest places.

== Plot summary ==
Rhys Mason, former monk of Majere, begins the novel trying to escape death knight Auseric Krell. Rhys, having retrieved the soul of the Dark Knight Ariakan imprisoned by Chemosh in a khas piece, hands the piece over to Zeboim. She sends Rhys and Nightshade back to Solace. Once there, the sheriff, Gerard, seeks others for counsel about the mounting Beloved situation. Rhys agrees with Gerard to stay in Solace and help in any way possible.

After an encounter with a Beloved, Rhys, Nightshade, and Atta (Rhys' dog) head after the creature, eventually ending up in New Port. Here, Rhys finally finds his brother Lleu, a Beloved introduced in the first Dark Disciple novel, who he has been tracking ever since. Elsewhere, Mina has been imprisoned in a new tower of magic in Istar, at the bottom of the Blood Sea. It has been newly erected by the dark god of magic, Nuitari. At a Conclave of Wizards meeting, Nuitari reveals to his cousins about his tower. The three agree to erect three Towers of High Sorcery again, one for each of them. Back in the Tower, Mina begins her task set before her by Chemosh of searching for the Solia Febalas (Hall of Sacrilege). Once she has found it, she is unable to take anything for Chemosh because she becomes so overwhelmed by the god-presence in the Hall. Finally, Nuitari returns and gives Mina over to Zeboim who had begun an assault upon the Tower.

Zeboim takes Mina first to New Port where Rhys and his brother are at to have them meet. While there, Mina has a vision of Rhys and insists he knows the truth about her. Rhys' brother also pleads with Mina to take his life as a Beloved because he wishes it no longer. Before Mina can answer, Zeboim gives her back to Chemosh, who is irate with Mina for not getting any artifacts for him. He has been growing increasingly agitated that the Beloved will only follow her command and resist any by him or Krell. Rhys again tails his brother and finally confronts him again along with New Port authority when his brother tries to kill a woman. The woman's child attacks the Beloved on behalf of his mother and the Beloved is instantly destroyed, leaving the child in a coma-like state. Krell decides it would be in Chemosh's best interest if Krell would kill Mina, who is now being imprisoned by Chemosh. As he tries to follow through with his plan, Mina does something extraordinary; she makes him a human again. Then, because she believes Chemosh would want it, she pulls the Tower of Istar from the sea bottom and places it on top on an island in the middle of the ocean. Passing out from such exertion, the novel ends with all of the major and minor gods showing up and pondering over the nature of the unconscious Mina. Majere finally reveals that Mina is in fact a god like them, one of light, who was swayed and corrupted somehow by the Dark Queen Takhisis.

== See also ==
- List of Dragonlance novels
