= Dragons of the Hourglass Mage =

2009 novel by Margaret Weis and Tracy Hickman

- Cover
- Authors: Tracy Hickman; Margaret Weis
- Cover artist: Matthew Stawicki
- Language: English
- Series: Lost Chronicles trilogy
- Genre: Fantasy literature
- Publisher: Wizards of the Coast
- Publication date: August 4, 2009 (mass market hardback)
- Publication place: United States
- Media type: Print (Hardcover)
- Pages: 352 pp
- ISBN: 978-0-7869-4916-8
- OCLC: 178287132
- Dewey Decimal: 813/.54 22
- LC Class: PS3573.E3978 D7535 2009
- Preceded by: Dragons of the Highlord Skies

Dragons of the Hourglass Mage is a fantasy novel by Margaret Weis and Tracy Hickman, based on the Dragonlance fictional campaign setting. It is the third installment in the Lost Chronicles trilogy, which occurs between the storyline of the individual books (Dragons of Autumn Twilight, Dragons of Winter Night, and Dragons of Spring Dawning) which compose the Chronicles trilogy. The events of this novel entirely take place during the same time frame as the events described in Dragons of Spring Dawning.

== Plot introduction ==
Dragons of the Hourglass Mage reveals the motivations behind Raistlin's aspirations to become a god.

After Raistlin Majere became a wizard of the Black Robe, he travels to Neraka, the lord city of the Dark Queen, under the excuse of joining her forces, but in reality, he plots his own rise to power. When Takhisis discovers that the dragon orb has entered her city, she dispatches Draconians to find it and to destroy the wizard who protects it. However, Raistlin uncovers Takhisis' plot to seize control of all magic, and he moves to stop her. Meanwhile, Kitiara uth Matar, Raistlin's older sister, follows Takhisis' orders to set a trap for the Gods of Magic on the Night of the Eye.

== Characters ==
- Raistlin Majere
- Kitiara uth Matar
- Iolanthe
- Talent Orren
- Mari
- Lord Soth
- Par-Salian
- Justarius
- Ladonna

== Reception ==
The book chronicles the significant maturation of the character between his introduction in Dragons of Spring Dawning and later appearances, addressing many previously-unanswered questions.

Bookwatch praised the narration of the audiobook version by Sandra Burr, saying, "Any fantasy audio library will welcome this."
