= Darksword Adventures =

Tabletop fantasy role-playing game

Cover art by Larry Elmore

Darksword Adventures is a book by Margaret Weis and Tracy Hickman that was published by Bantam/Spectra in 1988. It describes the world of Thimhallen, the setting the Darksword trilogy written by Weis and Hickman. Most of the book describes the world and its history. The final chapter, "Phantasia", describes a fantasy role-playing game that is set in Thimhallen.

== Description ==
Darksword Adventures is a book that describes a role-playing game set in Thimhallen, the world of Margaret Weis and Tracy Hickman's Darksword novels. The rules for the game are largely found in the final chapter of the book, while the previous chapters give an in-depth background of the world:

- The first chapter describes the universe as well as a travelogue of Thimhallen.
- The second chapters provides a detailed chronology of Thimhallen's history, including events of the Darksword trilogy.
- The third chapter describes magic and its economic and social repercussions.
- The fourth chapter describes the "mysteries", the abilities that new player characters will have.

The final part of the book, titled "Phantasia", contains the rules to a fantasy role-playing system.

Characters are defined by only five "mysteries": Combat, Prowess, Information, Shape, and Life. The game includes rules for movement, combat, and magic; statistics for important characters from the novels; and scenarios written in story form. The resolution mechanics are based on a hand-signal system. This system measures success according to a scale named for the in-universe game of Tarok: Total, Almost, Reasonable, Off, Canceled.

== Publication history ==
Margaret Weis and Tracy Hickman wrote the popular Darksword fantasy trilogy in 1987 and 1988. They then released a fourth book, Darksword Adventures, a mass market paperback published by Bantam/Spectra in 1988 that featured cover art by Larry Elmore and interior art by Stephen D. Sullivan.

== Reception ==
In his 1990 book The Complete Guide to Role-Playing Games, game critic Rick Swan wondered at the concept behind the role-playing game, since "The rules are so closely tied to the novels that adapting the material to other systems such as AD&D or RuneQuest is all but impossible. Worse, they're so detailed and jargon-heavy that role-playing novices won't know where to begin." Swan was extremely critical of what he saw as an unnecessary invention of new words to describe ordinary concepts, using as an example the word for distance. "Movement rates are given in mila per hour; a mila is about the same as a mile, so why the new word?" Swan noted that "when all the verbiage is cleared away, 'Phantasia' is a pretty good little RPG ... featuring an especially nice magic system." Swan concluded by giving the game a rating of 2.5 out of 4, saying that by linking the game so closely to the novels, "they've limited the game's appeal to a very narrow group; namely, advanced role-players who've thoroughly digested all three of the novels and are willing to learn a difficult game system that's essentially useless in any setting other than the Darksword universe."
