= Dragons of the Highlord Skies =

Fantasy novel by Margaret Weis and Tracy Hickman

- Cover of the first edition
- Authors: Tracy Hickman; Margaret Weis
- Cover artist: Matthew Stawicki
- Language: English
- Series: Lost Chronicles trilogy
- Genre: Fantasy novel
- Publisher: Wizards of the Coast
- Publication date: July 2007 (mass market hardcover)
- Publication place: United States
- Media type: Print (Hardcover and Paperback)
- Pages: 456 pp
- ISBN: 978-0-7869-4333-3
- OCLC: 126889349
- Dewey Decimal: 813/.54 22
- LC Class: PS3573.E3978 D753 2007
- Preceded by: Dragons of the Dwarven Depths
- Followed by: Dragons of the Hourglass Mage

Dragons of the Highlord Skies is a fantasy novel by Margaret Weis and Tracy Hickman, based on the Dragonlance fictional campaign setting. It is the second of the Lost Chronicles trilogy, designed to "fill-in" the gaps in the storyline between the books in the Dragonlance Chronicles trilogy (Dragons of Autumn Twilight, Dragons of Winter Night, and Dragons of Spring Dawning). The events of the novel entirely take place during the same time frame as the events described in Dragons of Winter Night.

== Plot ==
The Dragon Emperor Ariakas devises a plan to corrupt the Knights of Solamnia and sends Dragon Highlord Kitiara uth Matar to tempt a power-hungry knight, Derek Crownguard, with the location of a Dragon Orb, which Ariakas believes the Knights will not be able to control. A disguised Kitiara convinces Derek that Dragon Orbs can be used to help the Knights resist the invasion of their homeland, so Derek, along with fellow knights Brian Donner and Aran Tallbow, sets out to the former seaport of Tarsis to find more information about the Dragon Orbs.

Kitiara then travels to the city of Haven to investigate the possible involvement of her friends and family in the death of the Dragon Highlord Verminaard. Kitiara quickly confirms that her former lover, Tanis Half-Elven, and her half-brothers Raistlin and Caramon Majere were involved in Verminaard's death. Kitiara also learns that Tanis is traveling with his former girlfriend, the incredibly beautiful elven princess Laurana, and consumed by jealousy, becomes dangerously obsessed with Laurana.

Kitiara travels to Icewall Castle and a rivalry is formed between her and the dark elf wizard, Feal-Thas, the Dragon Highlord of the White Army. She insists Feal-Thas allow the Dragon Orb under his care to be taken by the knights when they arrive, and Feal-Thas insists she first defeats the horrible guardian of the Orb. Kitiara does so and then travels to the city of Tarsis to seek out her former companions.

Derek and his companions are also in Tarsis. There, Brian falls in love with an Aesthetic named Lilith, who directs them to the kender Tasslehoff Burrfoot who helps the knights decipher a book that confirms that there is a Dragon Orb being kept in Icewall Castle. Before the knights can do anything with this knowledge though the city of Tarsis is attacked by the Red Dragonarmy.

The Companions, who are also in Tarsis, are split up when the Dragonarmy attacks the city. Tanis Half-Elven, Caramon, Raistlin, Tika Waylan, Riverwind, and Goldmoon travel with Alhana Starbreeze to the Elvish kingdom of Silvanesti (their journeys being described in detail in Dragons of Winter Night). Kitiara meanwhile has located the remaining Companions consisting of Sturm Brightblade, Flint Fireforge, Tasslehoff Burrfoot, Elistan, Gilthanas, and Laurana. After secretly observing Laurana, Kitiara decides the elven princess is much too beautiful a rival to let live and orders her forces to attack the Companions while she ambushes Laurana.

Kitiara attacks Laurana from behind, taking the elfmaid by surprise. Kitiara expects an easy victory over a rival she dismisses as just a pampered princess, but Laurana fights back ferociously, and it is only with the help of the sivak draconian, Slith, that Kitiara is finally able to subdue Laurana. Meanwhile, the rest of Kitiara's forces are being defeated by Elistan and Sturm. Kitiara and Slith drag Laurana off into a nearby alley, but before Kitiara can kill Laurana, she is driven off by the arrival of Derek Crownguard's group of knights and Elistan. Derek's knights then join with the rest of the Companions to seek the Dragon Orb from Icewall Castle (the details of which are only briefly discussed or alluded to in Dragons of Winter Night).

More is learned about the bitter rivalry between Sturm Brightblade and Derek Crowngaurd, the latter of which is the main reason Sturm was unable to complete his trials to become a knight. Aran and especially Brian begin to sympathize with Sturm.

Kitiara is tormented with dreams of the dark Goddess Takhisis and a death knight named Lord Soth. Little does she know, at the time, that Takhisis is attempting to gain the service of Soth in the Dragonwars, and Soth will only serve a Dragon Highlord with the courage to spend one night in his castle. He makes her return to the Dragon Army command in the city of Sanction.

Suspicion spreads about Kitiara's possible role in the death of Verminaard and her connection to the Companions. Emperor Ariakas fears she may be attempting a power-grab, and has her investigated. Kitiara is found guilty, due in part to the testimony of Feal-Thas, and imprisoned.

For the first time, Kitiara prays to Takhisis and promises to do anything, even confront Lord Soth, if her life were spared. She is overheard, via scrying, by Ariakas's other lover, Iolanthe. Iolanthe frees Kitiara and binds her to her promise regarding Lord Soth, feeling Kitiara would ultimately triumph in the power struggle with Ariakas.

Sturm, Derek, and the rest of the company meet the natives of Icewall and ask for their help in defeating Feal-Thas. Laurana devises a plan to use Elistan's magic to help them attack Feal-Thas's stronghold, Icewall Castle, and the Icefolk agree to help. The Icefolk also give Laurana a Frost Reaver, a magic battle axe made of ice, for the upcoming battle.

The Companions and their Icefolk allies successfully attack Icewall Castle and confront Feal-Thas. Aran and Brian fall to Feal-Thas's wolves but then Laurana uses the Frost Reaver to slay Feal-Thas. As detailed in Dragons of Winter Night, the Companions find not only the Dragon Orb, but a frozen good dragon and a broken dragonlance.

Kitiara makes her way to the castle of Lord Soth, battles many of his guardians, and stands up to him before falling unconscious. Lord Soth is impressed, gives her protection from his guardians as she sleeps, and agrees to join Takhisis's army under the command of Kitiara.

== Characters ==
=== Heroes of the Lance ===
- Laurana Kanan, Daughter of the Speaker of the Suns and princess of the Qualinesti Elves. Love interest of Tanis Half-Elven
- Sturm Brightblade, a squire to the Knights of Solamnia and deeply honorable man.
- Flint Fireforge, a gruff old dwarf and grandfather figure to the companions.
- Tasslehoff Burrfoot, a happy-go-lucky, innocent, and genial kender.

=== Knights of Solamnia ===
- Derek Crownguard, Knight of the Rose and antagonist to Sturm Brightblade.
- Brian Donner, long-time friend and companion of Derek.
- Aran Tallbow, old friend of the other knights, sent along to moderate Derek's behaviour.

=== Villains ===
- Kitiara uth Matar, Highlord of the Blue Dragonarmy and second only to Ariakas. Former lover of Tanis Half-Elven.
- Ariakas, self-proclaimed "Emperor of Ansalon" and commander-in-chief of the Dragonarmies.
- Feal-Thas, a dark elf wizard and opponent to Kitiara's plans.
- Iolanthe, Ariakas' witch and willing lover.

== Publication history ==
Dragons of the Highlord Skies was published in July 2007. The audiobook version of the novel is narrated by Sandra Burr. Other books in the series include Dragons of the Dwarven Depths (Volume I).

== Reception ==
Peter Cannon of Publishers Weekly stated that "Weis and Hickman have once again produced an entertaining high fantasy adventure".

Jackie Cassada of Library Journal wrote: "Returning to their beloved world of the Dragonlance novels, Weis and Hickman discover new tales of familiar heroes. The follow-up to Dragons of the Dwarven Depths should satisfy long-time series fans and attract new ones of all ages. Recommended for most fantasy collections."

California Bookwatch called Burr's narration of the audiobook "compelling [and] smooth".
