= Dragons of a Lost Star =

2001 novel by Margaret Weis and Tracy Hickman

- Cover of Dragons of a Lost Star
- Author: Margaret Weis and Tracy Hickman.
- Cover artist: Matthew Stawicki
- Language: English
- Series: War of Souls
- Genre: Fantasy novel
- Publisher: Wizards of the Coast
- Publication date: April 2001
- Publication place: United States
- Media type: Print (Paperback)
- Pages: 560
- Preceded by: Dragons of a Fallen Sun

Dragons of a Lost Star is a NY Times Best Seller fantasy novel by Margaret Weis and Tracy Hickman. It is the second novel published in the War of Souls trilogy and part of the large Dragonlance series.

== Plot summary ==
A messenger arrives with news for Targonne, leader of the Knights of Neraka, that the Silvanesti shield has fallen and the dragon Beryl has invaded the Citadel of Light in search of an artifact of the Fourth Age. In an attempt to escape Beryl’s forces, Palin Majere and Tasslehoff Burrfoot use the Device of Time Journeying only to have it fall apart. They delay the draconians forces by using magic from the pieces of the device but are trapped with no other means of escape. When all hope seems lost, they find themselves in the Tower of High Sorcery, saved by the elf wizard Dalamar. Meanwhile, Gilthas, King of the Qualinesti, prepares for the evacuation of his people from Beryl’s approaching army. Supporting the elves, Marshal Medan of the Neraka Knights sends the Solamnic Knight Sir Gerard away for aid, knowing that it will never arrive. With Gerard gone, Gilthas and his mother, Laurana confront a traitor who was employed by Medan in their household. Unmasked, the traitor Kalindas strikes Laurana only to be slain by his own brother Kelevandros. Within the city of Silvanesti, Mina performs miracles in the name of the One God gaining the support of the elves. Only the Kirath elves remain wary, but their warnings go unheeded. Silvanoshei, King of Silvanesti meets with Samar, his mother’s servant, and learns that his mother Alhana has returned and is asked to join her. Silvanoshei refuses to leave for he has fallen in love with Mina and sends Samar away. Seeing the approaching threat to his authority from Mina’s rising fame, Targonne plots to assassinate her. Enthralled by Mina, Silvanoshei receives a ring along with a note signed in his mother’s name promising the wearer of the ring will love him in return. After wearing the ring given by Silvanoshei, Mina is poisoned and seemingly dies, which is all part of Targonne’s plot. Hearing news of Mina’s death, Targonne flies to Silvanesti to attend her funeral only to have his treachery exposed by the revived Mina. After beheading Targonne, Mina and her knights journey to Nightlund while her remaining forces loot and subjugate Silvanesti. During the confusion, Silvanest is rescued by Alhana’s soldiers but soon leaves them to follow Mina. Within the Tower of High Sorcery, Palin attempts to escape but drowns in the souls of the dead surrounding the tower only to be saved by Tasslehoff. While Palin and Dalamar search for ways to leave, Tasslehoff leaves the tower after discovering the pieces of the Device of Time Journeying returned to him. With the support of the dwarves, Gilthas begins evacuating his people through tunnels dug beneath the city. Arriving at Solanthus, Gerard is captured by Solamnic Knight Odila after being mistaken as a dragonrider. Reaching Nightlund, Mina visits Dalamar in the Tower of High Sorcery and arranges a meeting with a future visitor. Tasslehoff eventually finds himself in the city of Solanthus where he joins Goldmoon and attempts to convince the Knights’ Council of Gerard’s innocence. Meeting with Gilthas and Medan, Laurana informs her son that she will remain behind with the defense while Gilthas must leave with his people. Laurana and Medan then enter the elven treasury where she recovers the dragonlance and gives the Lost Star, a magical sword, to Medan. Mina meets with the blue dragon Skie and after a heated discussion; Mina fatally wounds him and leaves him for dead. Mirror, a blind dragon and guardian of the Citadel of Light heals Skie as he requires answers from him. Gerard and Tasslehoff awake in prison to find everybody else asleep and are freed by Goldmoon who wishes to use Gerard’s dragon Razor. Following their tracks, Odila finds Gerard who insists on joining the battle with the approaching Dark Knights. Disguising himself as a Knight and Odila as his prisoner, Gerard and Odila manage to slip pass the army and return to the city. After a brief battle, the Solamnic Knights lose the city of Solanthus after caught completely unprepared by Mina’s forces, the souls of the dead. While Laurana and Medan are preparing for the dragon’s arrival, Medan is slain by Kelevandros as revenge for his brother. Facing the dragon alone, Laurana manages to wound Beryl and the elves’ trap is set into motion; Beryl is dragged to the ground with magically strengthened rope. However, the plan goes amiss when the evacuation tunnels collapse, bringing down the city along with the dragon. Arriving at the Tower of High Sorcery, Goldmoon meets with Mina who asks that Goldmoon worship the One God. Learning the name of the One God, Goldmoon dies after refusing to support Takhisis, Queen of Darkness.

== Reception ==
The novel debuted at number 12 on the NY Times Best Seller list.

== Reviews ==
- Science Fiction Chronicle

== See also ==
- War of Souls
