= The War of Souls =

Dragonlance novel series by Margaret Weis and Tracy Hickman

- Dragons of a Fallen Sun; Dragons of a Lost Star; Dragons of a Vanished Moon
- Author: Margaret Weis and Tracy Hickman
- Country: United States
- Language: English
- Genre: Fantasy
- Publisher: Wizards of the Coast
- Published: April 2000 - July 2002
- Media type: Print (Paperback)
- No. of books: 3
- Preceded by: Dragons of Summer Flame
- Followed by: Dark Disciple

The War of Souls is a trilogy of New York Times best selling novels published between 2000 and 2002. The trilogy focuses on the titular fictional war (the War of Souls) set in the popular Dragonlance fictional universe. Like many Dragonlance novels, the War of Souls trilogy can be read as stand alone novels or in series order. The three books in the series are Dragons of a Fallen Sun, Dragons of a Lost Star, and Dragons of a Vanished Moon, all of which were co-authored by Margaret Weis and Tracy Hickman. Dragons of Fallen Sun debuted on the New York Times best seller list at 14, Dragons of Lost Star at 12, and Dragons of Vanished Moon at 10.

== Plot ==
=== Background ===
The world of Krynn became a very different place with the disappearance of the gods. Dragons, much larger and more malicious than any native to Krynn, appeared and claimed much of the continent of Ansalon, calling themselves Dragon Overlords. Most of the native dragons are either dead or enslaved. The metallic dragons have disappeared. With the loss of the gods comes the loss of magic, and the Wizards' Conclave had been disbanded years ago. Although sorcery, discovered by Palin Majere, was adopted, it is slowly fading for reasons unknown. Everyone, including the Dragon Overlords, experience the effect. The Knights of Takhisis, with the loss of their Queen, became the Knights of Neraka, a somewhat less honorable outfit than their predecessors, led by Lord of the Night Morham Targonne. Goldmoon, one of the few remaining Heroes of the Lance, has established the Citadel of Light on the island of Schallsea. In the elven realm of Qualinesti, Gilthas, the "puppet king", rules only in title, while the nation is truly run by the occupying Knights of Neraka. Their cousins, the Silvanesti, have banished their heir, Silvanoshei, his mother, and his father. With the gods gone, the time period, fittingly, is known as the "Age of Mortals" as said by Fizban in chapter 32 (title: Rain. Autumn. Farewell.)

=== Story ===
The War of Souls begins in 421 AC, 38 years after the events of Dragons of Summer Flame. A small band of Knights of Neraka meet Mina, a mysterious woman who appeared during a freak storm. Through incredible feats, she convinces them to pledge themselves to "the One God" and follow her to march on the besieged city of Sanction.

Over and over, Mina is able to convert her opponents and save the day. The city of Sanction is retaken by the Solamnic Knights, and the old gods return to the world. The elven nations, now under the reign of Gilthas, seek a new home. Paladine, now mortal, takes on the name Valthonis and joins with Gilthas' fate. Her new followers all return to their lives with a new outlook.

== Reception ==
In his review of Dragons of a Vanished Moon, James Voelpel of mania.com noted that "although never quite a fan of the Dragonlance novels, the War of Souls trilogy seemed quite different from all the previous books". He noted that "Weis and Hickman's writing style has improved immensely since their beginning way back in '85" and considered the novel great for fans of fantasy fiction and a must for hardcore Dragonlance fans.

Similarly Josh Fink of fictionfactor.com review of Dragons of a Vanished Moon rated the final novel of the trilogy 5 stars and stated it was reminiscent of the original Dragonlance released 15 years prior. He commented that "The story is so well written, that it flows from the book into your mind in an endless flow of elven wine—a wine so smooth that you beg for more, and never place the book down, whenever you can help it."

Reviewer Peter Cannon of Publishers Weekly wrote that Dragons of a Vanished Moon is "another admirable addition to the history, lore and ways of Krynn".

== Bibliography ==
- Dragons of a Fallen Sun (April 2000), by (ISBN 0-7869-1807-1)
- Dragons of a Lost Star (April 2001), by Margaret Weis and Tracy Hickman, (ISBN 0-7869-2706-2)
- Dragons of a Vanished Moon (January 2002), by Margaret Weis and Tracy Hickman, (ISBN 0-7869-2950-2)
