= Dragons of a Vanished Moon =

2002 novel by Margaret Weis and Tracy Hickman

- Cover of the first edition
- Authors: Margaret Weis; Tracy Hickman
- Language: English
- Series: The War of Souls
- Genre: Fantasy literature
- Publisher: Wizards of the Coast
- Publication date: July 2002
- Publication place: United States
- Media type: Print (Paperback)
- Pages: 640
- ISBN: 978-0786929504

Dragons of a Vanished Moon is a 2002 fantasy novel by Margaret Weis and Tracy Hickman. It became a New York Times Best Seller.

== Premise ==
The novel is part of The War of Souls trilogy. It begins with Palin Majere and Dalamar trapped inside the Tower of High Sorcery trying to find a way out.

== Reception ==
The novel debuted at number 10 on The New York Times Best Seller list.

In his review, James of mania.com noted that "although never quite a fan of the DRAGONLANCE novels, the WAR OF SOULS trilogy seemed quite different from all the previous books". He noted that "Weis and Hickman's writing style has improved immensely since their beginning way back in '85" and considered the novel great for fans of fantasy fiction and a must for hardcore Dragonlance fans.

Similarly, Josh Fink of fictionfactor.com review of Dragons of a Vanished Moon rated the final novel of the trilogy 5 stars and stated it was reminiscent of the original Dragonlance released 15 years prior. He commented that "The story is so well written, that it flows from the book into your mind in an endless flow of elven wine—a wine so smooth that you beg for more, and never place the book down, whenever you can help it."

== Reviews ==
- Publishers Weekly
