= Dragons of a Fallen Sun =

2000 novel by Margaret Weis and Tracy Hickman

- Cover of the first edition
- Authors: Margaret Weis; Tracy Hickman.
- Language: English
- Series: War of Souls
- Genre: Fantasy literature
- Publisher: Wizards of the Coast
- Publication date: April 2000
- Publication place: United States
- Media type: Print (Paperback)
- Pages: 624
- ISBN: 978-0786918072
- Preceded by: Dragons of Summer Flame

Dragons of a Fallen Sun is a fantasy novel by American writers Margaret Weis and Tracy Hickman. It is the first novel published in The War of Souls trilogy and part of the large Dragonlance series.

== Summary ==
The Gods have abandoned Krynn, and dragons rule the continent, where nations are divided among them. The dragons resist war only on a weak treaty that states that the little magic in Krynn is divided equally among them. Caramon Majere is on his deathbed, and sends a Solamnic Knight, Gerard on a quest with the kender Tasslehoff Burrfoot, who has come back by means of the Device of Time Traveling, to find Dalamar. They set out on their dangerous quest by going to Qualinesti, where they can find Palin Majere, who could possibly know where Dalamar could be. Meanwhile, the Qualinesti are threatened with destruction by their dragon ruler who knows that the most powerful magical artifact is in her nation, and therefore rightfully hers. Alhana Starbreeze continues to try to penetrate the protective shield around Silvanesti, put in place by their green dragon tyrant, which is believed to be a great, wise, and beautiful elf. Silvanoshei, Alhana's son, finds his way through the barrier and into Silvanost, where he is rightfully made king. The Knights of Neraka (formerly known as the Dark Knights) have been overtaken by the mysterious power of a seventeen-year-old girl Mina, who has come to lead them to the victory of the world by the one true God, from which Mina obtains all her power. Mina's clan joins the siege of Solamnia, and when they defeat the Solamnic Knights by means of Mina, they are sent to attack Silvanesti. By the power of Mina's one true God, the Knights make their way safely through Blöde, and miraculously through the Silvanesti shield.

== Reception ==
Kirkus Reviews states "Kirkus, having previously remarked on the inexplicable popularity of the Weis-Hickman combo, has nothing to add."

The novel debuted at number 14 on the NY Times Best Seller list.

Dragons of a Fallen Sun won the Origins Awards for Best Game-Related Novel of 2000.

== Reviews ==
- Review by Brian Murphy (2000) in Realms of Fantasy, August 2000

== See also ==
- War of Souls
