= B. Dalton =

American retail bookstore chain

B. Dalton Bookseller
- Type: Subsidiary
- Industry: Retail
- Founded: 1966; 60 years ago (original); February 2022; 4 years ago (revival)
- Founder: Bruce Dayton
- Defunct: February 2013; 13 years ago (original)
- Fate: Liquidation
- Headquarters: Minneapolis, Minnesota, United States
- Number of locations: 779 at peak; approx. 50 at liquidation; 1 (2022)
- Area served: United States
- Key people: Richard Hagen, president
- Products: Books
- Parent: Barnes & Noble

B. Dalton Bookseller was an American retail bookstore chain founded in 1966 by Bruce Dayton, a member of the same family that operated the Dayton's department store chain. B. Dalton expanded to become the largest retailer of hardcover books in the United States, with 779 stores at the peak of the chain's success. Located mainly at indoor shopping malls, B. Dalton competed primarily with Waldenbooks. Barnes & Noble acquired the chain from Dayton's in 1987 and continued to operate it until a late 2009 announcement that the last 50 stores would be liquidated by January 2010. B. Dalton was later revived by rebranding a Barnes & Noble location in 2022.

== History ==
Bruce Dayton, a member of the family that operated Dayton's, a department store chain based in Minneapolis, Minnesota, founded the B. Dalton chain in 1966. He named the bookstore chain after himself, but substituted an L for the Y in his surname. The name B. Dalton was also chosen because it "connoted quality, dependability and authority."

The first store opened in nearby Edina in August of that year, followed by a second in St. Louis, Missouri. Although the chain was originally intended to operate in downtowns and suburban areas, the majority of the stores were opened inside regional shopping malls. In 1969, Dayton's merged with Hudson's of Detroit and became Dayton Hudson Corporation (now Target Corporation).

B. Dalton expanded throughout the 1960s and 1970s, going from twelve stores in 1968 to 125 five years later, peaking at 798 locations in 1986. In 1968, the chain acquired Pickwick Books; they merged in 1979. B. Dalton had stores in 43 of 50 states in 1978, and was second to Waldenbooks (then the U.S.'s largest bookstore) in store numbers, but posted higher profits than its rival. A flagship store opened in Manhattan in December 1978, and between 1983 and 1986, the chain revived the Pickwick name as a discount bookstore.

=== 1980s and 1990s ===
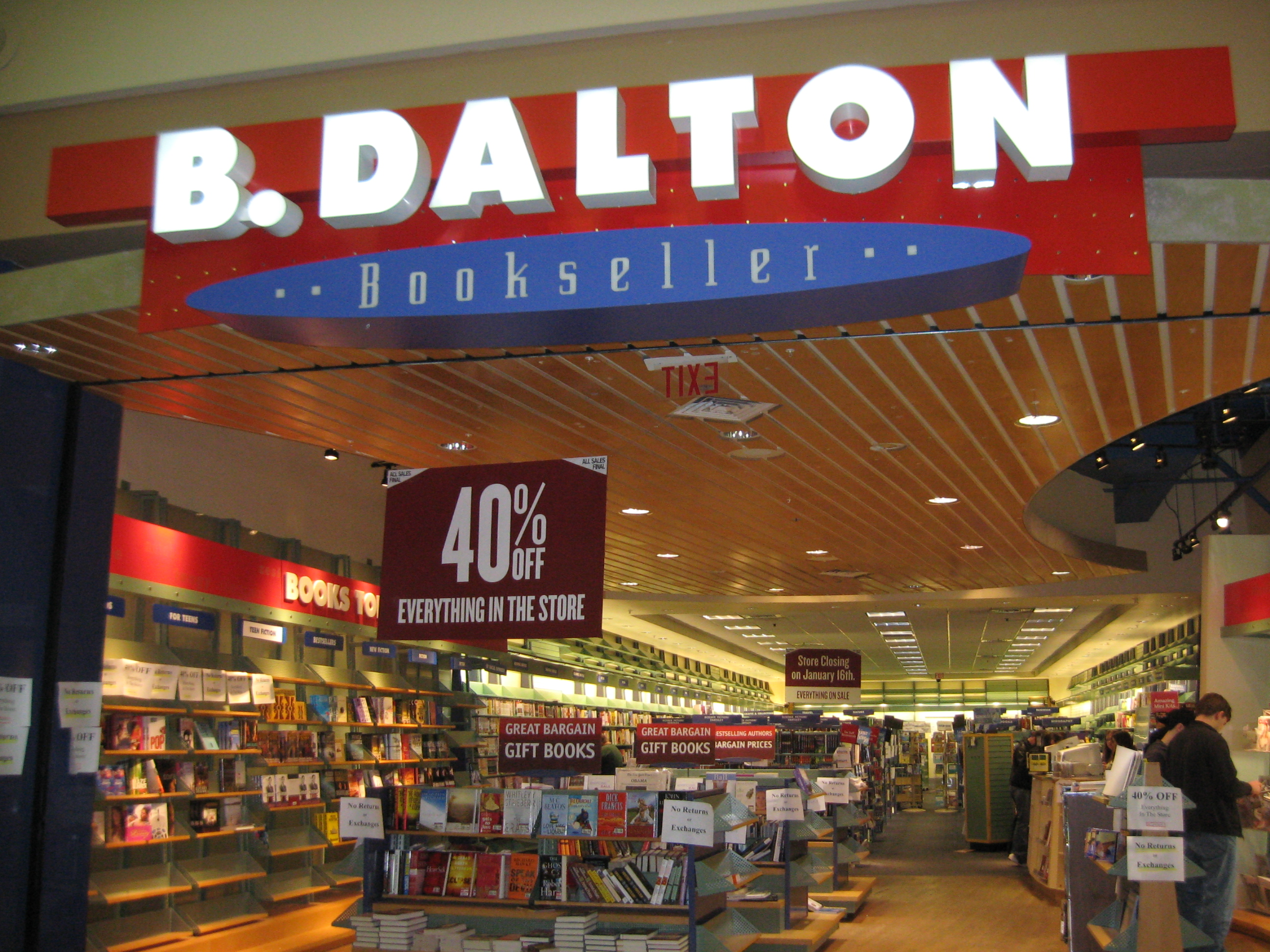
A B. Dalton store in Slidell, Louisiana, a few weeks before it closed in January 2010

By 1986, discounting practices by rival book chains had caused declining profits for B. Dalton stores, as had the decrease in new shopping malls. As a result of the declining profits, Dayton Hudson Corporation sold the B. Dalton chain to Barnes & Noble. Under Barnes & Noble's ownership, B. Dalton acquired Scribner Book Stores, Inc. from Rizzoli International Bookstores in 1989, and began a video game store called Software, Etc. (now GameStop). At the same time, the chain began closing outlets and relocating others, while opening other prototypes. By 1997, the chain had shrunk to 528 locations, and continued to close many more over the next decade.

In January 2010, Barnes & Noble closed the last 50 B. Dalton locations, except for the stores at Union Station in Washington, D.C., and Roosevelt Field Mall in Garden City, New York. The Roosevelt Field Mall location closed in January 2012 and the Union Station location closed at the end of February 2013.

In February 2022, Barnes & Noble rebranded its Oviedo Mall location as B. Dalton, reviving the brand.

== Format ==
Initially, B. Dalton targeted middle-class suburban customers, with stores that featured parquet flooring and wide aisles. Later the store switched to a mass-market approach, allowing for a wider range of titles. B. Dalton was also one of the first chains to display hardcover and paperback books side by side. B. Dalton was also a sponsor of the PBS TV series Reading Rainbow from 1985 to 1987.

== Software Etc. ==
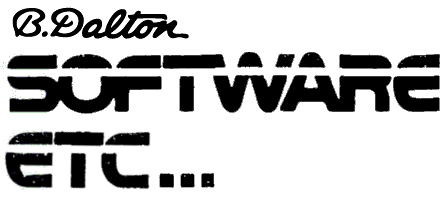
Software Etc.'s logo when launched by B. Dalton in 1985

In 1985, B. Dalton opened the first Software Etc., which sold computer books, magazines, and software products. Software Etc. initially began operating inside B. Dalton bookstores but was spun off in 1987 and began focusing on standalone stores. In 1994, Software Etc. successfully merged with competitor Babbage's. In 1996, NeoStar Retail Group Inc., then owner of Software Etc. and Babbage's, filed for Chapter 11 bankruptcy and put the two chains up for sale. By November, NeoStar had failed to find a buyer and announced that all 707 stores owned by the company would close in the next year. By November 26, the plan to close the stores was halted, as NeoStar's assets were sold to an investor group led by retailer Leonard Riggio. In 1999, the newly formed Babbage's Etc. launched the GameStop chain and was sold to Barnes & Noble. The sale reunited the Software Etc. chain with its original parent company, B. Dalton. Barnes & Noble purchased Funco, Inc. in 2000 and merged Babbage's Etc. to become a wholly owned subsidiary of Funco. Funco changed its name to GameStop, Inc. and became independent from Barnes & Noble by 2004. Since then, GameStop has phased out the Software Etc. name from its stores.
