= Waldenbooks =

Defunct American bookstore chain

Walden Book Company, Inc.
- Trade name: Waldenbooks
- Type: Subsidiary
- Industry: Retail
- Founded: March 4, 1933; 93 years ago in Bridgeport, Connecticut
- Founder: Lawrence Hoyt; Melvin Kafka
- Defunct: July 18, 2011; 15 years ago
- Fate: Liquidation as a result of bankruptcy of the Borders Group
- Headquarters: Ann Arbor, Michigan
- Number of locations: 1
- Area served: United States
- Products: Books, magazines, comic books, maps, calendars, gift cards
- Parent: Borders
- Website: waldenbooks.com at the Wayback Machine (archived September 28, 2002)

Walden Book Company, Inc., doing business as Waldenbooks, was an American shopping mall-based bookstore chain. In its later years it was a subsidiary of Borders. The chain also ran a video game and software chain under the name Waldensoftware, as well as a children's educational toy chain under Walden Kids. In 2011, the chain was liquidated in bankruptcy.

== History ==
On March 4, 1933, Lawrence Hoyt (1902–1982), a former sales manager for Simon & Schuster, and Melvin T. Kafka (1905–1992) opened a rental library within leased space inside a Bridgeport, Connecticut, department store under the name Walden Book Company (named for Henry David Thoreau's Walden, a meditation on simple living in natural surroundings). The pair believed that their business would help people cope with the effects of the Great Depression. Books were lent out for three cents per day to save customers the cost of purchasing the books while providing affordable entertainment. By 1948, Hoyt and Kafka had opened 250 book rental locations.

Waldenbooks logo c.1960s

Hoyt opened the first Walden bookstore in Pittsburgh in 1962. Within 15 years, the company had grown to over 250 locations in leased locations within various department stores. With the increased availability of low-cost paperbacks after the Second World War, rental library services were eventually replaced with retail book selling.

=== Acquisitions ===
By the 1970s, the company had sales of just under $200 million. In 1969, it was purchased by the Broadway Hale Stores, a California-based department-stores holding company that was later renamed Carter Hawley Hale in 1974. For the stand-alone bookstores, the company initially traded under the name Walden Books, written as two words. During the 1970s, the company gradually changed its trade name to Waldenbooks, written as a single word.

In 1984, Waldenbooks acquired three stores that were located in upscale neighborhoods from the bankrupted Brentano's chain with the original intent of converting the stores to the Waldenbooks brand, however, Waldenbooks discovered that when they continued to operate the newly acquired stores as Brentano's, the new stores were generating more sales than equivalent Waldenbooks, so Waldenbooks decided to continue and expand the Brentano's brand in select upscale neighborhoods.

In 1984, Waldenbooks itself was acquired by Kmart after Carter Hawley Hale needed to get cash to defend itself from a hostile takeover attempt. At that time, Waldenbooks was the largest retail bookstore chain. Under Kmart's ownership, Walden attempted to expand and diversify its business. In 1985, it opened a discount book outlet chain called Reader's Market by converting five existing stand-alone Waldenbooks stores. A year later, Walden discontinued the discount bookstores after disappointing sales figures. Walden later tried this concept within selected Kmart stores.

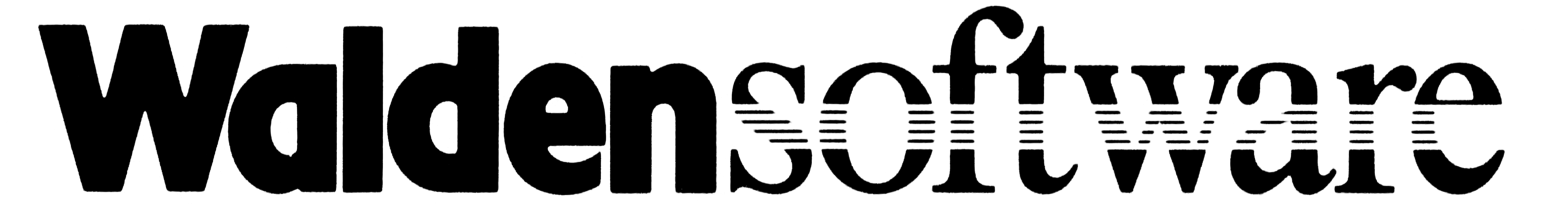
WaldenSoftware logo (c. 1997)

Waldenkids logo (c. 1987)

After terminating the discount book strategy, Walden began experimenting with larger stores by opening Waldenbooks & More stores that included merchandise beyond books, WaldenSoftware computer software stores, and WaldenKids educational toys stores. In 1987, Waldenbooks acquired the U.S. stores of the Canadian bookstore chain Coles Book Stores Ltd. and gradually converted the stores to Waldenbooks. By 1990, Waldenbooks began to convert Waldenbooks & More into even larger Waldenbooks & More Books stores with a greatly expanded book selection.

In 1992, Walden opened nine book superstores under the Basset Book Shop name; ultimately these stores were converted to Borders locations after the merger.

Kmart expanded its bookstore holdings by acquiring Borders in 1992. At that time, Kmart kept Borders and Waldenbooks separate, but converted Waldenbooks' Bassett stores to the Borders brand.

When Kmart decided to spin off its noncore subsidiaries in 1994, Kmart merged Waldenbooks, Brentano's, and Borders to form the Borders-Walden Group. At that time, Waldenbooks had 1,216 stores in all 50 states. In 1995, the renamed Borders Group was able to buy back its company shares and it was listed independently on the New York Stock Exchange.

Beginning in 2004, many Waldenbooks locations were rebranded as Borders Express stores. Borders Group, in an attempt to increase profits and lower the overall expense of their Waldenbooks brand, also announced that it was downsizing the Waldenbooks chain to respond to the current "competitive environment". In January 2010, 200 stores, almost two-thirds of the total, were closed.

On July 18, 2011, Borders Group filed for liquidation to close all of its remaining Waldenbooks and other stores. Liquidation commenced on July 22, 2011.

== In popular culture ==
- On July 16, 2018, streaming service Netflix released a teaser for the upcoming third season of its hit series Stranger Things. The ad was made in the style of a 1985 mall advertisement, and includes an image of a "newly opened" Waldenbooks store among its offerings. In reality, the crew of Stranger Things did a cosmetic restoration of a portion of the Gwinnett Place Mall in Duluth, Georgia, returning authentic signage and storefronts to the mall to represent many businesses that have since ceased to exist.

== See also ==
- List of defunct retailers of the United States
