= List of Werewolf: The Apocalypse books =

A comprehensive list of Werewolf: The Apocalypse books by White Wolf Publishing, including production code and ISBN.

== Werewolf: The Apocalypse ==
Book name	White Wolf Product Number	ISBN	Date Published
Werewolf: The Apocalypse (1st Edition)	WW3000	ISBN 1-56504-027-9	1992
Werewolf Screen (1st Edition)	WW3001	ISBN 1-56504-035-X	1992
Rite of Passage	WW3002	ISBN 1-56504-036-8	1992
Ways of the Wolf	WW3050	ISBN 1-56504-044-9	1993
Tribebook: Black Furies (1st Edition)	WW3051	ISBN 1-56504-093-7	1994
Tribebook: Bone Gnawers (1st Edition)	WW3052	ISBN 1-56504-094-5	1994
Tribebook: Children of Gaia (1st Edition)	WW3053	ISBN 1-56504-141-0	1994
Tribebook: Fianna (1st Edition)	WW3054	ISBN 1-56504-325-1	1994
Tribebook: Get of Fenris (1st Edition)	WW3055	ISBN 1-56504-326-X	1995
Tribebook: Glass Walkers (1st Edition)	WW3056	ISBN 1-56504-327-8	1995
Tribebook: Red Talons (1st Edition)	WW3057	ISBN 1-56504-328-6	1995
Tribebook: Shadow Lords (1st Edition)	WW3058	ISBN 1-56504-329-4	1995
Tribebook: Silent Striders (1st Edition)	WW3059	ISBN 1-56504-330-8	1996
Tribebook: Silver Fangs (1st Edition)	WW3060	ISBN 1-56504-331-6	1997
Tribebook: Stargazers (1st Edition)	WW3061	ISBN 1-56504-332-4	1997
Tribebook: Uktena (1st Edition)	WW3062	ISBN 1-56504-333-2	1998
Hengeyokai: Shapeshifters of the East	WW3063	ISBN 1-56504-338-3	1998
Project Twilight	WW3064	ISBN 1-56504-310-3	1995
Freak Legion: A Player's Guide to Fomori	WW3066	ISBN 1-56504-350-2	1995
Axis Mundi: The Book of Spirits	WW3067	ISBN 1-56504-315-4	1996
Rage Across the World Volume 1	WW3069	ISBN 1-56504-319-7	1996
Rage Across the World Volume 2	WW3070	ISBN 1-56504-320-0	1996
Rage Across the World Volume 3	WW3071	ISBN 1-56504-324-3	1996
Kinfolk: Unsung Heroes	WW3074	ISBN 1-56504-308-1	1997
Breedbook: Bastet	WW3075	ISBN 1-56504-335-9	1997
Breedbook: Nuwisha	WW3076	ISBN 1-56504-336-7	1997
Breedbook: Corax	WW3077	ISBN 1-56504-337-5	1998
Tribebook: Wendigo (1st Edition)	WW3078	ISBN 1-56504-334-0	1998
Breedbook: Gurahl	WW3079	ISBN 1-56504-339-1	1998
Breedbook: Ratkin	WW3080	ISBN 1-56504-342-1	1999
Breedbook: Mokolé	WW3081	ISBN 1-56504-306-5	1999
Breedbook: Ananasi	WW3082	ISBN 1-56504-359-6	2000
Breedbook: Rokea	WW3083	ISBN 1-56504-364-2	2001
Breedbook: Nagah	WW3084	ISBN 1-56504-348-0	2001
Rage Across New York	WW3100	ISBN 1-56504-040-6	1992
Valkenburg Foundation	WW3101	ISBN 1-56504-047-3	1993
Under a Blood Red Moon	WW3102	ISBN 1-56504-049-X	1993
Dark Alliance: Vancouver	WW3103	ISBN 1-56504-059-7	1993
Rage Across the Amazon	WW3104	ISBN 1-56504-061-9	1993
Rage Across Russia	WW3105	ISBN 1-56504-077-5	1993
Rage Across Australia	WW3106	ISBN 1-56504-127-5	1994
Rage Across Appalachia	WW3107	ISBN 1-56504-313-8	1995
The Werewolf Players Guide (2nd Edition)	WW3108	ISBN 1-56504-352-9	1998
Book of the Wyrm (2nd Edition)	WW3109	ISBN 1-56504-356-1	1998
Rage Across the Heavens	WW3110	ISBN 1-56504-309-X	1999
Umbra (Revised Edition)	WW3111	ISBN 1-56504-361-8	2001
Croatan Song	WW3112	ISBN 1-56504-388-X	2000
Book of the Wyld	WW3113	ISBN 1-56504-367-7	2001
Rage Across Egypt	WW3114	ISBN 1-58846-301-X	2001
Book of the Wyrm (1st Edition)	WW3200	ISBN 1-56504-041-4	1993
Caerns: Places of Power	WW3201	ISBN 1-56504-066-X	1993
Werewolf Players Guide (1st Edition)	WW3202	ISBN 1-56504-057-0	1993
Monkeywrench: Pentex	WW3203	ISBN 1-56504-060-0	1994
Werewolf Storytellers Handbook	WW3205	ISBN 1-56504-131-3	1994
Werewolf Chronicles Volume 1	WW3207	ISBN 1-56504-321-9	1996
Werewolf Chronicles Volume 2	WW3208	ISBN 1-56504-322-7	1997
Book of the Weaver	WW3209	ISBN 1-56504-311-1	1998
The Silver Record	WW3210	ISBN 1-56504-307-3	1999
Subsidiaries: A Guide to Pentex	WW3211	ISBN 1-56504-358-8	2000
Guardians of the Caerns	WW3212	ISBN 1-56504-360-X	2000
A World of Rage	WW3213	ISBN 1-56504-362-6	2000
Litany of the Tribes Volume 1	WW3380	ISBN 1-56504-302-2	1997
Litany of the Tribes Volume 2	WW3381	ISBN 1-56504-303-0	1998
Litany of the Tribes Volume 3	WW3382	ISBN 1-56504-304-9	1998
Litany of the Tribes Volume 4	WW3383	ISBN 1-56504-305-7	2000
Who’s Who Among Werewolves: Garou Saga	WW3401	ISBN 1-56504-140-2	1994
Rage: Warriors of the Apocalypse	WW3403	ISBN 1-56504-318-9	1996
Chronicle of the Black Labyrinth	WW3404	ISBN 1-56504-314-6	1996
Werewolf: The Apocalypse (2nd Edition)	WW3600	ISBN 1-56504-112-7	1994
Werewolf Screen (2nd Edition)	WW3601	ISBN 1-56504-113-5	1994
Werewolf: The Wild West	WW3700	ISBN 1-56504-340-5	1997
Frontier Secrets: Werewolf: The Wild West Screen and Book	WW3701	ISBN 1-56504-341-3	1997
Ghost Towns	WW3703	ISBN 1-56504-343-X	1998
Wild West Companion	WW3704	ISBN 1-56504-344-8	1998
Tales from the Trails: Mexico	WW3705	ISBN 1-56504-345-6	1998
Werewolf: The Apocalypse (Revised Limited Edition)	WW3799	ISBN 1-56504-366-9	2000
Werewolf: The Dark Ages	WW3800	ISBN 1-56504-357-X	1999
Werewolf: The Apocalypse (Revised Edition)	WW3801	ISBN 1-56504-365-0	2000
Werewolf Storytellers Companion (Revised Edition)	WW3802	ISBN 1-56504-323-5	2001
Art of Werewolf: The Apocalypse	WW3803	ISBN 1-58846-302-8	2000
Werewolf Storytellers Handbook (Revised Edition)	WW3804	ISBN 1-58846-304-4	2002
Players Guide to Garou	WW3806	ISBN 1-58846-313-3	2003
Players Guide to the Changing Breeds	WW3807	ISBN 1-58846-318-4	2003
Possessed: A Players Guide	WW3810	ISBN 1-58846-307-9	2002
Umbra: The Velvet Shadow	WW3204	ISBN 1-56504-076-7	1993
Book of the City	WW3811	ISBN 1-58846-310-9	2002
Book of Auspices	WW3812	ISBN 1-58846-315-X	2003
Hammer and Klaive	WW3813	ISBN 1-58846-317-6	2003
Past Lives	WW3814	ISBN 1-58846-319-2	2003
Tribebook: Black Furies (Revised Edition)	WW3851	ISBN 1-56504-389-8	2001
Tribebook: Bone Gnawers (Revised Edition)	WW3852	ISBN 1-58846-300-1	2001
Tribebook: Children of Gaia (Revised Edition)	WW3853	ISBN 1-58846-303-6	2002
Tribebook: Fianna (Revised Edition)	WW3854	ISBN 1-58846-306-0	2002
Tribebook: Get of Fenris (Revised Edition)	WW3855	ISBN 1-58846-312-5	2002
Tribebook: Glass Walkers (Revised Edition)	WW3856	ISBN 1-58846-308-7	2002
Tribebook: Red Talons (Revised Edition)	WW3857	ISBN 1-58846-309-5	2002
Tribebook: Shadow Lords (Revised Edition)	WW3858	ISBN 1-58846-311-7	2002
Tribebook: Silent Striders (Revised Edition)	WW3859	ISBN 1-58846-314-1	2003
Tribebook: Silver Fangs (Revised Edition)	WW3860	ISBN 1-58846-316-8	2003
Tribebook: Stargazers (Revised Edition)	WW3861	ISBN 1-58846-320-6	2003
Tribebook: Uktena (Revised Edition)	WW3862	ISBN 1-58846-321-4	2003
Tribebook: Wendigo (Revised Edition)	WW3863	ISBN 1-58846-322-2	2003
Wild West Poker Deck	WW3938	ISBN 1-56504-349-9	1997
Apocalypse	WW3999	ISBN 1-58846-323-0	2004
Dark Ages: Werewolf	WW3800	ISBN 1-58846-284-6	2003

Tribebook
Shadow Lords

Shadow Lords Tribebook is a supplement published by White Wolf Publishing in 1995 for the modern-day horror role-playing game Werewolf: The Apocalypse. Shadow Lords Tribebook, a softcover book written by Brian Campbell and illustrated by Andrew Bates, Mike Chaney, James Daly, Matthew Milberger, Steve Prescott, Alex Sheikman, and Dan Smith, is one of thirteen "Tribebooks"; each one describes one of the werewolf tribes. This book details the history and culture of the tribe known as the Shadow Lords. In three chapters and three appendices, it explores their reputation and status around the world, their most famous members and game statistics for their unique abilities.

- Chapter 1: their history
- Chapter 2: tribal politics and their social order
- Chapter 3: their relationships and interactions with the other twelve tribes
- Appendix A: peculiarities of the tribe
- Appendix B: archetypes of characters within the tribe
- Appendix C: notable personalities who were members of this tribe, including Rasputin

The book includes a blank character sheet. In the July 1996 edition of Arcane, Mark Barter gave this book a thumbs up and an above average rating of 8 out of 10 and saying, "Recommended for all referees who either have a Shadow Lord player in their group, or intend to bring the tribe into their games in some way, and especially for players of Shadow Lord characters."

=== New Books within the Onyx Path ===
As of 2011 White Wolf Publishing started to publish new material for the cWoD. These books are available only as Print on Demand or limited-run deluxe editions, therefore they lack ISBN.

During GenCon 2012 it was announced that Onyx Path Publishing has the license to publish table-top RPG material for all classic World of Darkness lines. They will produce the titles previously announced by White Wolf.

Book name	White Wolf Product Number	Date Published	Notes
Werewolf Translation Guide	-	April 10, 2012	Exclusive at DriveThruRPG
Werewolf: The Apocalypse (20th Anniversary Edition)	-	March 6, 2013	Core Rulebook (abbreviated W20); Since the Kickstarter ended exclusive at DriveThruRPG
W20 Skinner	-	November 21, 2013	Adventure/Module - Exclusive at DriveThruRPG
W20 Changing Breeds	-	November 21, 2013	Sourcebook - Exclusive at DriveThruRPG
W20 Rage Across the World	-	December 30, 2013	Sourcebook - Exclusive at DriveThruRPG
W20 Cookbook	-	January 16, 2014	Cookbook - Exclusive at DriveThruRPG
W20 Wyld West Expansion	-	June 27, 2014	Conversion Sourcebook - Exclusive at DriveThruRPG
W20 White Howlers Tribebook	-	November 5, 2014	Splatbook - Matches design of 1st Edition Tribebooks; Exclusive at DriveThruRPG
W20 Umbra: The Velvet Shadow	-	November 12, 2014	Sourcebook - Exclusive at DriveThruRPG
W20 Book of the Wyrm	-	November 13, 2014	Sourcebook - Exclusive at DriveThruRPG
W20 Art of Changing Breeds: A Visual Guide to the Fera	-	June 3, 2015	Art Book - Exclusive at DriveThruRPG
W20 Storyteller Screen	-	March 23, 2016	Gamemaster's Screen - Exclusive at DriveThruRPG
W20 Kinfolk: A Breed Apart	-	October 5, 2016	Sourcebook - Exclusive at DriveThruRPG
W20 Shattered Dreams	-	November 16, 2016	Sourcebook - Exclusive at DriveThruRPG
W20 Changing Ways	-	December 20, 2017	Sourcebook - Exclusive at DriveThruRPG
W20 Pentex Employee Indoctrination Handbook	-	January 17, 2018	Sourcebook - Exclusive at DriveThruRPG
W20 Art of Werewolf the Apocalypse	-	November 6, 2019	Art Book - Exclusive at DriveThruRPG
W20 Auspice Gift Cards	-	November 13, 2019	Gaming Aid - Exclusive at DriveThruRPG
W20 The Apocalyptic Record	-	June 7, 2023	Sourcebook - Exclusive at DriveThruRPG
W20 Howls of Apocalypse	-	July 19, 2023	Sourcebook - Exclusive at DriveThruRPG
W20 Icons of Rage	-	January, 2024	Sourcebook - Exclusive at DriveThruRPG

=== Licensed Books ===
In 1993 Steve Jackson Games released Werewolf: the Apocalypse, among other classic World of Darkness lines, as a setting for GURPS. The softcover has 208 pages and ISBN 1-55634-276-4.

== Known Errors ==
Some copies of Rage Across the Amazon have ISBN 1-56504-041-4 which is the same as Book of the Wyrm (1st Edition).

== Novels ==
Title	Production Number	ISBN
Breathe Deeply	WW11300	ISBN 1-56504-881-4
Call To Battle: Book 1 in The Saga Of Jay No-Name	WW11304	ISBN 1-56504-885-7
The Silver Crown	WW11301	ISBN 1-56504-882-2
Werewolf Tribe Novel 1: Shadow Lords & Get of Fenris	WW11150	ISBN 1-56504-855-5
Werewolf Tribe Novel 2: Silent Striders & Black Furies	WW11151	ISBN 1-56504-883-0
Werewolf Tribe Novel 3: Red Talons & Fianna	WW11152	ISBN 1-56504-884-9
Werewolf Tribe Novel 4: Bone Gnawers & Star Gazers	WW11153	ISBN 1-56504-886-5
Werewolf Tribe Novel 5: Children of Gaia & Uktena	WW11154	ISBN 1-58846-812-7
Werewolf Tribe Novel 6: Silver Fangs & Glass Walkers	WW11155	ISBN 1-58846-813-5
Werewolf Tribe Novel 7: Black Spiral Dancers & Wendigo	WW11156	ISBN 1-58846-822-4
The Last Battle	WW11911	ISBN 1-58846-856-9

Note: Breathe Deeply and The Silver Crown were marketed under the Rage-Logo.
Note: Breathe Deeply makes use of the Amazonas setting, as detailed in the game supplement Rage across the Amazon (1993; ISBN 1-56504-061-9).
Note: Call to Battle was intended as first of a series about the main character (as written on the cover), but no follow-up was published. The book also makes use of material from the game line Mage: The Ascension.
Note: The Tribe Novel Series refers to the content of The Silver Crown, while The Last Battle refers to the content of the Tribe Novel Series. Many of the main characters in those novels are considered signature characters of the game line.

=== Novels published by HarperCollins ===
Werewolf: Conspicuous Consumption	ISBN 0-06-105471-2
Werewolf: Hell-Storm, by James A. Moore	ISBN 0-06-105675-8
Werewolf: Watcher	ISBN 0-06-105672-3
Werewolf: Wyrm Wolf	ISBN 0-06-105439-9

=== Novels published by Onyx Path Publishing ===
The Poison Tree, by Mike Lee	Originally announced as part of W20 Kickstarter as "Houses of the Moon"

=== Licensed Books ===
Pinnacle Entertainment released three installments of its Dime Novel series set in the world of its roleplaying game Deadlands, that contained a single crossover story with Werewolf: The Wild West. The issues are named „Strange Bedfellows”, „Savage Passage” and „Ground Zero”. All are available in an electronic version on DriveThruRPG. Two issues have conversion guidelines between both games in their respective appendix.

== Anthologies ==
When Will You Rage (1st Edition)	WW11002	ISBN 1-56504-087-2
When Will You Rage (2nd Edition)	WW11901	ISBN 1-56504-903-9
Drums around the Fire	WW3400	ISBN 1-56504-058-9
World of Darkness: Strange City	Harper	ISBN 0-06-105668-5

World of Darkness: Strange City contained some of the Werewolf: the Apocalypse short stories also found in When Will You Rage?, together with stories based on White Wolf's games Vampire: the Masquerade and Wraith: the Oblivion.

The following Books each contain one novel based on Werewolf:The Apocalypse and other novels based on other games set in the same fictional world:

The Essential World of Darkness	White Wolf Publishing, 1997	ISBN 1-56504-864-4
The Quintessential World of Darkness	White Wolf Publishing, 1998	ISBN 1-56504-880-6

=== Anthologies published by Onyx Path Publishing ===
Rites of Renown: When Will You Rage II	January 9, 2014	Electronic and Print on Demand

== Comics ==
Partly retrieved from "http://www.moonstonebooks.com"

Note: These are stand-alone publications. There are also comic strips as introduction elements in the 1st Edition series of Tribebooks, as well as in the Breedbooks and in the 2nd Edition Core Rulebook.

=== Single Stories ===
Bone Gnawer	Moonstone 2001	ISBN 0-9710129-2-X
Black Furies	Moonstone 2002	ISBN 0-9712937-2-4
Children of Gaia	Moonstone 2002	ISBN 0-9712937-5-9
Fianna	Moonstone 2002	ISBN 0-9710129-5-4
Get of Fenris	Moonstone 2003	ISBN 0-9721668-9-0

=== Compilations ===
Fang & Claw Volume 1	Moonstone 2003	ISBN 0-9721668-7-4	Compilation of Bone Gnawer, Black Furies and Children of Gaia
Fang & Claw Volume 2	Moonstone 2003	ISBN 0-9726443-4-2	Compilation of Fianna, Get of Fenris and the new issue Glasswalker
Nightmares in our Midst: Vampires and Werewolves	Moonstone 2004	ISBN 0-9712937-7-5	Compilation of 'Black Furies' together with the comics 'Toreador' and 'Theo Bell' based on the Vampire game by White Wolf Publishing
