= Werewolf fiction =

Fantasy genre

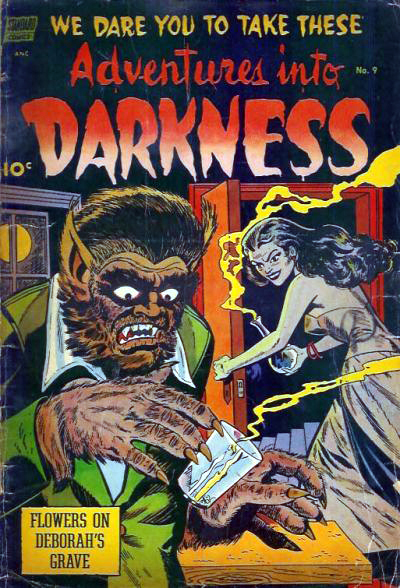
Adventures into Darkness, a Golden Age comic book series that ran for 10 issues from August 1952–1954

Werewolf fiction denotes the portrayal of werewolves and other shapeshifting therianthropes, in the media of literature, drama, film, games and music. Werewolf literature includes folklore, legend, saga, fairy tales, Gothic and horror fiction, fantasy fiction and poetry. Such stories may be supernatural, symbolic or allegorical.

An early cinematic example of the theme is The Wolf Man (1941) which along with Frankenstein's Monster and Count Dracula comprise some notable modern horror works. Werewolf fiction is an exceptionally diverse genre however, with ancient folkloric roots and manifold modern re-interpretations.

== Literary origins ==
In Greek mythology, there is a story of an Arcadian King called Lycaon who tested Zeus by serving the god a dish of his own slaughtered and dismembered son to see if Zeus was really all-knowing. As punishment for his trickery, Zeus transformed Lycaon into a wolf and killed his 50 sons by lightning bolts, but supposedly revived Lycaon's son Nyctimus, who the king had slaughtered and who succeeded his father in the kingdom of Arcadia.

In medieval romances, such as Bisclavret and Guillaume de Palerme, the titular werewolf is presented as relatively benign in comparison to others, appearing as the victim of evil magic and aiding knights errant.

However, in most legends influenced by medieval theology, the werewolf was a Satanic beast with a craving for human flesh. This appears in such later fiction as "The White Wolf of the Hartz Mountains": an episode in the novel The Phantom Ship (1839) by Frederick Marryat, featuring a demonic femme fatale who transforms from woman to wolf.

Sexual themes are common in werewolf fiction; the protagonist kills his girlfriend as she walks with a former lover in the film Werewolf of London (1935), suggesting sexual jealousy. The writers of The Wolf Man (1941) were careful in depicting killings as motivated out of hunger.

The wolf in the fairy tale "Little Red Riding Hood" has been reinterpreted as a werewolf in many works of fiction, such as The Company of Wolves (1979) by Angela Carter (and its 1984 film adaptation) and the film Ginger Snaps (2000), which address female sexuality. 2011 also saw the release of Red Riding Hood with Amanda Seyfried in the main role, with the character name of Valerie.

== Folklore ==
In folk and fairy tale traditions all over the world, humans who can shapeshift at will into both human and lupine forms appear in several fairy tales. According to the Aarne-Thompson-Uther Index, they can appear in this capacity in the following tale types:

- Aarne-Thompson-Uther Index tale type ATU 409, "The Girl as Wolf": a tale type more commonly found in the folklore of Estonia and Finland, a human hunter finds a woman in the woods and hides her animal (wolf) skin. Years later, after the wolf-maiden has given birth to children, one of them finds her wolf skin and returns it to her. She puts it back and disappears, never to return.
- Aarne-Thompson-Uther Index tale type ATU 425, "The Search for the Lost Husband" and ATU 425A, "The Animal Bridegroom": a maiden is betrothed to an animal bridegroom (a wolf, in several variants), who comes at night to the bridal bed in human form. The maiden breaks a taboo and her enchanted husband disappears. She is forced to search for him. Example: The White Wolf, Belgian fairy tale; Prince Wolf, Danish fairy tale.
- Aarne-Thompson-Uther Index tale type ATU 425C, "Beauty and the Beast": a father has three daughters, the youngest the most beautiful and the most loved by her parent. He needs to go on a journey and asks his daughter what presents should he bring them, the youngest suggest something simple, but very or nearly impossible to find. Near the end of his journey, he finds the wished-for object in the garden of a (seemingly) abandoned castle, when a booming voice interrupts him. The voice belongs to a fierce creature (sometimes explicitly described as a wolf by the narrative) who demands "his most precious gift" in return: the youngest daughter. She willingly offers herself to the beast and discovers he is an enchanted prince. She helps him break the curse and they both live happily ever after.
- Aarne-Thompson-Uther Index tale type ATU 552, "The Girls who married Animals": a bankrupt nobleman or a poor farmer is forced to wed his daughters to three animal suitors, who are actually enchanted princes under a curse. In some variants, one of the suitors is a wolf.

== 19th century ==
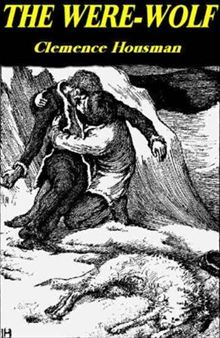
The Were-Wolf by Housman

Nineteenth-century Gothic horror stories drew on previous folklore and legend to present the theme of the werewolf in a new fictional form. An early example is Hugues, the Wer-Wolf by Sutherland Menzies, published in 1838. The year after in 1839, Frederick Marryat's book The Phantom Ship was published, which included one of the first stories about a female werewolf, and is often reprinted as a stand-alone short story called The White Wolf of the Hartz Mountains. In another, Wagner the Wehr-Wolf (1847) by G. W. M. Reynolds, we find the classic subject of a man who, although a kind-hearted man himself, accepts a Deal with the Devil to become a werewolf for 18 months accompanying Dr. Faustus and killing humans, in exchange for youth and wealth. "The Man-Wolf" (1831) by Leitch Ritchie yields the werewolf in an 11th-century setting, while Catherine Crowe penned what is believed to be the first werewolf short story by a woman: "A Story of a Weir-Wolf" (1846). Other werewolf stories of this period include The Wolf Leader (1857) by Alexandre Dumas and Hugues-le-Loup (1869) by Erckmann-Chatrian.

A later Gothic story, Robert Louis Stevenson's Strange Case of Dr Jekyll and Mr Hyde (1886), has an implicit werewolf subtext, according to Colin Wilson. This has been made explicit in some recent adaptations of this story, such as the BBC TV series Jekyll (2007). Stevenson's Olalla (1887) offers more explicit werewolf content, but, like Strange Case of Dr Jekyll and Mr Hyde, this aspect remains subordinate to the story's larger themes.

Charles De Coster's 1867 novel The Legend of Thyl Ulenspiegel and Lamme Goedzak includes an extensive episode where the Flemish town of Damme is terrorized by what seems a rampaging werewolf, the numerous victims' bodies bearing what seems the mark of a wolf's fangs - thought ultimately they turn out to have been killed by a completely mundane serial killer, clever and ruthless, who used metal blades to simulate these wolf's tooth marks.

A rapacious female werewolf who appears in the guise of a seductive femme fatale before transforming into lupine form to devour her hapless male victims is the protagonist of Clemence Housman's acclaimed The Were-wolf published in 1896.

== 20th and 21st centuries ==
=== In literature ===
The 20th century saw an explosion of werewolf short stories and novels published in both England and America. The famed English supernatural story writer Algernon Blackwood wrote a number of werewolf short stories. These often had an occult aspect to them. English author Gerald Biss published the 1919 werewolf novel The Door of the Unreal. American pulp magazines of the 1920 to 1950s, such as Weird Tales, include many werewolf tales, written by such authors as H. Warner Munn, Seabury Quinn and Manly Wade Wellman. Robert E. Howard made his own contribution to the genre in "Wolfshead".

The most renowned werewolf novel of the 20th century was The Werewolf of Paris (1933) by American author Guy Endore. This novel has been accorded classic status and is considered by some to be the Dracula of werewolf literature. It was adapted as The Curse of the Werewolf in 1961 for Hammer Film Productions. The novel The Wolf's Bride: A Tale from Estonia written by the Finnish author Aino Kallas was published in 1928 and it tells the story of the forester's wife living in Hiiumaa in the 17th century who became a werewolf under the influence of a malevolent forest spirit. A more recent example is Moon of the Wolf (1967) by Les Whitten, which the 1972 movie of the same name, Moon of the Wolf, was based on.

The book series Goosebumps featured an assortment of werewolves ranging from the bipedal werewolves to the quadrupedal werewolves that resemble larger wolves. The book The Werewolf of Fever Swamp featured Will Blake who also appeared in the films Goosebumps and Goosebumps: Haunted Halloween. The book A Shocker on Shock Street featured Wolf Boy and Wolf Girl who were from a horror movie franchise called Shock Street. The book Werewolf Skin reveals the titular item can turn its wearers into werewolves like it did with Alex Hunter's Aunt Mart and Uncle Colin. Give Yourself Goosebumps featured werewolves in Night in Werewolf Woods, The Werewolf of Twisted Tree Lodge, and All-Day Nightmare. The book The Werewolf in the Living Room features Ben Grantley who was responsible for biting Aaron Friedlus.

In the Harry Potter stories (1997 to 2007), the characters Remus Lupin (Defence Against the Dark Arts teacher during Harry's third year at Hogwarts, who becomes one of Harry's friends), and Fenrir Greyback (a villain), are werewolves.

=== In films ===
In cinema during the silent era, werewolves were portrayed in canine form in such films as The Werewolf (1913) and Wolf Blood (1925). The first feature film to portray an anthropomorphic werewolf was Werewolf of London in 1935 (not to be confused with the 1981 film of a similar title), establishing the canon that the werewolf always kills what he loves the most. The main werewolf of this film was a dapper London scientist who retained some of his style and most of his human features after his transformation.

However, he lacked warmth, and it was left to the tragic character Laurence Stewart "Larry" Talbot played by Lon Chaney Jr. in 1941's The Wolf Man to capture the public imagination. This catapulted the werewolf into public consciousness. The theme of lycanthropy as a disease or curse reached its standard treatment in the film, which contained the now-famous rhyme:

Even a man who is pure in heart
And says his prayers by night
May become a wolf
When the wolfbane blooms
And the autumn moon is bright.

This movie draws on elements of traditional folklore and fiction, such as the vulnerability of the werewolf to a silver bullet (as seen for instance in the legend of Beast of Gévaudan), though at the climax of the film, the Wolf Man is actually dispatched with a silver-handled cane.

While the process of transmogrification is sometimes portrayed in such films and works of literature to be painful, other works omit this aspect in favor of a loss of consciousness during the change and even an inability to recall the event. Regardless, the resulting wolf is typically cunning but merciless, and prone to killing and eating people without compunction, regardless of the moral character of the person when human.

Lon Chaney Jr. himself became somewhat typecast as the Wolf Man and reprised his role in several sequels for Universal Studios. In these films, the werewolf lore of the first film was clarified. In Frankenstein Meets the Wolf Man (1943) it is firmly established that the Wolf Man is revived from the dead at a night of the full moon after his grave was disturbed. In House of Frankenstein (1944), silver bullets are used for the first time to dispatch him. Further sequels were House of Dracula (1945) and the parodic Abbott and Costello Meet Frankenstein (1948).

The success of Universal's The Wolf Man prompted rival Hollywood film companies and to bring out their own, now somewhat obscure, werewolf films. The first of these was The Mad Monster (1942) from Poverty Row studio Producers Releasing Corporation, followed later the same year by Fox Studios' The Undying Monster, adapted from Jessie Douglas Kerruish's eponymous 1936 novel. Other entries were Columbia Pictures's The Return of the Vampire (1943) and Cry of the Werewolf (1944).

In 1981, two prominent werewolf films, The Howling and An American Werewolf in London, both drew on themes from the Universal series. While the werewolves in The Howling resembled bipedal wolves, the one in An American Werewolf in London had a more quadrupedal form with longer claws, a short tail, and finger-like structures on its front paws. The latter had a follow-up called An American Werewolf in Paris.

The films Ginger Snaps, Ginger Snaps 2: Unleashed, and Ginger Snaps Back: The Beginning featured werewolves. While the werewolf in the first film was depicted as a larger and nearly hairless wolf, the werewolves in the latter had more fur on them. Ginger Fitzgerald (portrayed by Katharine Isabelle) and Brigitte Fitzgerald (portrayed by Emily Perkins) are known werewolves in this franchise.

The climatic scene of the film Dark Shadows revealed that Carolyn Stoddart (portrayed by Chloë Grace Moretz) is a werewolf. This depiction shows her almost similar to Larry Talbot, but with more wolf-like legs. It was revealed by the witch Angelique Bouchard (portrayed by Eva Green) that she sent a werewolf to bite Carolyn while she was an infant.

The 2024 film Werewolves reveal that a certain Supermoon has been turning anyone exposed to its lights into werewolves. They resemble large, furry, bulky, and broad-shouldered humanoids with wolf-like heads, no tails, and remnants of their human forms like clothing fragments, earrings, and tattoos.

=== In television ===
- The So Weird episode "Werewolf" featured a werewolf named Laura (portrayed by Chantal Conlin). Her werewolf form was not seen except for some glowing red eyes in the dark. At a young age, she was left on the doorstep of bed-and-breakfast owners Carl and Judy Whittaker (portrayed by Greg Michaels and Merilynn Gann). When a beast was attacking their chickens, they are unaware that it's Laura's werewolf form. When her family visits this bed-and-breakfast, Fiona "Fi" Phillips befriends Laura. Fi later learns the truth and Laura admits that she can't control her werewolf form which also explains why she has to sneak out at night and was found napping a lot. By the end of the episode, it is implied that Carl and Judy learned of her condition and persuaded their neighbors to be supportive of them.
- Teen Wolf, an American supernatural teen drama developed by Jeff Davis for MTV, reimagined the 1985 film. Tyler Posey stars as a young werewolf protecting his California town from supernatural threats. The series aired from June 5, 2011, to September 24, 2017, spanning six seasons.
- The television film adaption of Escape from Mr. Lemoncello's Library featured a werewolf (performed by Brin Alexander) residing in the horror section that came from an unidentified story.
- In the TV series Creepshow, there is a story called "Bad Wolf Down" where outnumbered soldiers gain the ability to become werewolves to take out their Nazi pursuers after befriending a locked-up woman who is a werewolf. There is also a Christmas special that is an adaption of the book Shapeshifters Anonymous where the main character turns out to be a werewolf. The season four episode "To Grandmother's House We Go" featured a werewolf that stalks a gold digger and her adoptive granddaughter when en route to the latter's grandmother.
- The short-lived TV series Wolf Pack featured both bipedal and quadrupedal werewolves.
- The animated series Wolf King, which is based on the novel, Wereworld, features Drew Ferran who's the last werewolf.
- In the Rick and Morty episode "Mort: Ragnarick", a werewolf that might be Larry Talbot was among the monsters in the Pope's clutches.
  - The "Ex" episode of the spin-off series President Curtis had President Andre Curtis contending with a werewolf syndicate that is against the monster reform programs done by President Curtis' ex-wife Beverly Mills. The werewolf syndicate was defeated at the cost of Special Agent Alan Chomps (voiced by Dan Bakkedahl) becoming a werewolf. Since the incident, Chomps has served as Curtis' first paranormal agent while struggling to get control of his werewolf form.

=== In Internet culture ===
In the early 2020s, werewolves have seen a resurgence through memes spread on platforms like TikTok. They are often ironic and satirical in nature, typically in mockery of online alpha male and lone wolf archetypes.

=== In games ===
As a well-known and iconic creature type, lycanthropes, and particularly werewolves, are central to a variety of games, including board games, role-playing games, and video games.

These include a number of games where lycanthropes are either incidental villains, or the primary villain of the game, as well as games that allow players to play as a lycanthrope. It has been noted with respect to video games in particular that werewolves are "most often presented in videogames as mindless, slavering enemies", though some games do provide a more nuanced presentation.

In more rare cases, they feature as NPCs, such as the character Witherfang from Dragon Age: Origins (2009), who is not strictly evil and was created as an act of revenge, or even the game's protagonist, as in the case of Bigby Wolf from The Wolf Among Us (2013), a noir adventure game based on the eponymous comic book series that includes characters inspired by fairy tales. The Legend of Zelda: Twilight Princess (2006) causes the series' recurring main character, Link, to become a werewolf, a transformation induced by a magical "Twilight" that has spread across the realm. In wolf form, he is ridden and guided by the imp Midna. While the idea was praised as fun to control, it also proved divisive, seen as a "gimmick" in comparison to controlling Link as a sword-wielding human.

Werewolves have long been a race in the tabletop game Dungeons & Dragons. In the game's 5th edition, its most recent version, werewolves are weak to silver, and can shift between human, wolf, and hybrid humanoid forms, being able to use weapons in both human and hybrid form.

==== Dungeons & Dragons ====
Lycanthrope
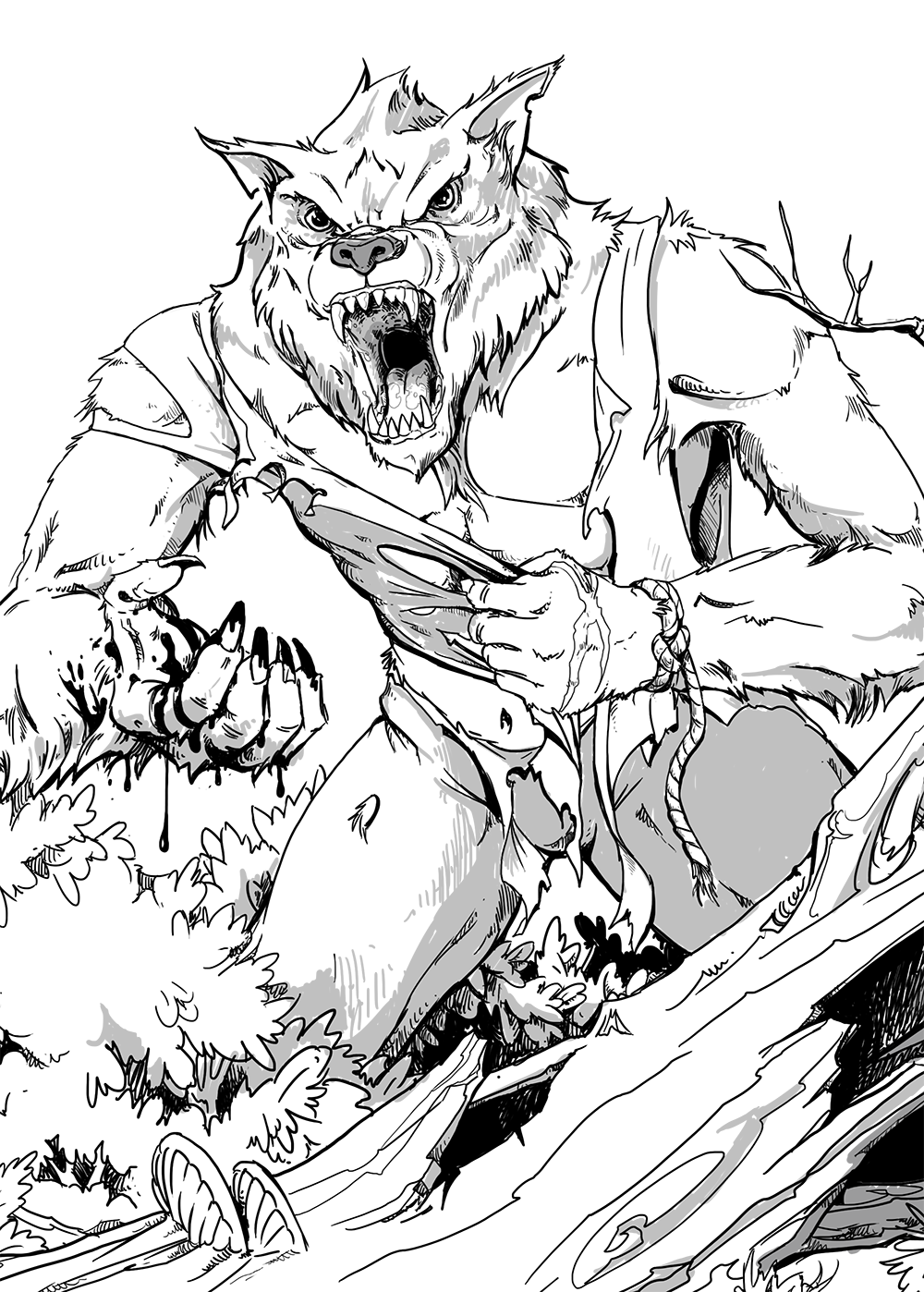
- Drawing based on the depiction of a werewolf in Dungeons & Dragons.
- First appearance: the original Dungeons & Dragons "white box" set (1974)
- Based on: Shapeshifting

In-universe information
- Type: Humanoid

In Dungeons & Dragons, a lycanthrope (/ˈlaɪkənθroʊp/ LY-kən-throhp or /laɪˈkænθroʊp/ ly-KAN-throhp) is a humanoid shapeshifter based on various legends of lycanthropes, werecats, and other such beings. In addition to the werewolf, in Dungeons & Dragons, weretigers, wereboars, werebears and other shapeshifting creatures similar to werewolves and related beings are considered lycanthropes, although strictly speaking, the term "lycanthrope" refers to a wolf-human combination exclusively. The presence of lycanthropes in the gaming system is one of the elements that has led Christian fundamentalists to condemn Dungeons & Dragons and to associate it with the occult.

In the standard Dungeons & Dragons rules, lycanthropy is both hereditary (the children of lycanthropes are lycanthropes of the same type) and infectious (victims of lycanthrope bites become lycanthropes themselves, of the same type as the attacker). The rules distinguish between natural and afflicted lycanthropes, according to the cause of lycanthropy, and handle them by different rules.

Hereditary lycanthropes can change shape at will, and retain their personality, being in control of their actions. Infected lycanthropes' shapechanges are affected by the full moon. They usually are not aware of their actions and act as aggressive predators. Lycanthropes can assume the form of an animal/humanoid hybrid, in addition to their animal form. Most lycanthropes in animal form can communicate with animals of their type. In humanoid form, they can use any weapon, and in animal form they use natural weapons like the corresponding animals, but each type has a different fighting style in hybrid form. An illustration in one edition of the Monster Manual implied that the beast in Disney's Beauty and the Beast was a lycanthrope, with a creature having a resemblance to the Beast attacking a human resembling that film's antagonist, Gaston.

Screen Rant has described the operation of lycanthropy in the game as an aspect that "makes no sense" because it is often a positive development for a character. "It is possible for a character to be infected with lycanthropy in Dungeons & Dragons and it comes highly recommended, as the benefits outweigh the negatives". It notes that "[i]n exchange for learning how to control your condition, you gain Damage Reduction, +2 to your Wisdom stat, the Scent ability, Low-Light Vision, a new Hit Dice, the Iron Will feat, and the ability to transform into a more powerful form". Like many examples of werewolves in modern fiction, D&D's werewolves and other lycanthropes are vulnerable to silver and highly resistant to other kinds of harm.

The archetypal lycanthrope, the werewolf, was ranked sixth among the ten best low-level monsters by the authors of Dungeons & Dragons For Dummies. The authors described the werewolf as "a classic monster" and "the best illustration of a monster with damage reduction; unless characters have a silver weapon, they will have a hard time hurting this creature". The authors also note that "Werewolves are shapechangers, which means players can never be entirely sure whether that surly villager might indeed be the great black wolf who attacked their characters out in the forest." The werewolf is also fully detailed in Paizo Publishing's book Classic Horrors Revisited (2009), on pages 58–63.

==== Werewolf: The Apocalypse ====
Another role-playing game featuring the creature is Werewolf: The Apocalypse from the Classic World of Darkness line by White Wolf Publishing. Other related products include the Collectible card games named Rage and several novels (including one series). In the game, players take the role of werewolves known as "Garou" (from the French loup garou). These werewolves are locked in a two-front war against both the spiritual desolation of urban civilization and supernatural forces of corruption that seek to bring about the Apocalypse. Game supplements detail other shapeshifters.

Along with the other titles in the World of Darkness, Werewolf was discontinued in 2004. Its successor title within the Chronicles of Darkness line, Werewolf: The Forsaken, was released on March 14, 2005. A fifth edition is in development. The books have been reprinted since 2011 as part of the "Classic World of Darkness" line.

==== Video games ====
Numerous video games have featured lycanthropes, both as antagonists of the player, and as playable characters.

- Knight Lore (1984)
- Altered Beast (1988) allows the player to take various creature forms over the course of the game, including a wolf, dragon, bear, tiger, and golden wolf.
- Werewolf: The Last Warrior (1990)
- Shining Force (1992)
- Contra: Hard Corps (1994) features a "cyborg werewolf" wearing "rad sunglasses" and named Brad Fang
- Darkstalkers (1994), features a playable werewolf named Jon Talbain
- Nightmare Creatures (1997)
- Castlevania: Legacy of Darkness (1999)
- The Legend of Zelda: Twilight Princess (2006)
- Wolf Team (2007)
- Sonic Unleashed (2008) is another of the few games to feature another form of lycanthrope, with the protagonist turning into a werehog
- Legendary (2008)
- Dragon Age: Origins (2009)
- Castlevania: Lords of Shadow (2010)
- The Elder Scrolls V: Skyrim (2011)
- Keyboard Drumset Fucking Werewolf (2011), a promotional video game made for the band Fucking Werewolf Asso
- Blood of the Werewolf (2013)
- The Wolf Among Us (2013–2014)
- Bloodborne (2015)
- The Order: 1886 (2015)
- Werewolves Within (2016)
- Werewolf: The Apocalypse – Earthblood (2021)
- The Quarry (2022)
- Deadlock features a hero named Silver, who is a werewolf

Some games have been noted to feature werewolf-like creatures, but without the element of lycanthrope. For example, in Pokémon, Zoroark has such an appearance as the final form of what previously appears as another creature.

==== Other kinds of games ====
Ultimate Werewolf, a card game designed by Ted Alspach and published by Bézier Games, is based on the social deduction game, Werewolf, which is Andrew Plotkin's reinvention of Dimitry Davidoff's 1987 game, Mafia. The Werewolf game appeared in many forms before Bézier Games published Ultimate Werewolf in 2008.

== See also ==
- List of werewolves
- Werewoman
