= Werewolf (comics) =

Werewolf, in comics, may refer to:

- Werewolf (Dell Comics), a superhero werewolf published by Dell Comics
- Werewolf, the name of a number of Marvel Comics characters:
  - There are rings known as the "Werewolf rings" that were obtained along with other magic items by Joshua Kane that were allegedly from Aelfric. After Kane's death, his executor Geraldo Kabal gave one of the rings to Lou Hackett who used it to become an intelligent werewolf; it was apparently destroyed along with him. The second ring was taken from Kabal by Jack Russell, and it allowed him to retain his intellect (but not speak) until he lost it in Baron Thunder's building. The rings appeared in Werewolf by Night vol. 1 #20-21.
  - A Hungarian who developed the bloodlust when he was exposed to a drop of water in Uncanny Tales vol. 1 #23 was known as Werewolf.
  - In Marvel Tales vol. 1 #108, there is a werewolf who was married to a vampire.
- Werewolf: The Apocalypse, Moonstone Books comics based on the games of the same name
- "Werewolf", a story arc in Legends of the Dark Knight #71-73

== See also ==
- Werewolf comics, for a list of appearances of werewolf characters
- Werewolf (disambiguation)
- Warwolf, a werewolf member of Nick Fury's Howling Commandos
