= Jesper Myrfors =

American artist

Jesper Myrfors (born c. 1964 in Sweden) is a founding member of Hidden City Games and Clout Fantasy.

== Career ==
He was the original art director for Magic: The Gathering, and several of that game's initial expansions, as well as for the original set of Shadowfist. He also has several game designs to his credit, including the Magic expansion The Dark and The Hills Rise Wild (co-designed by John Scott Tynes). Myrfors graduated from Cornish College of the Arts with a BFA in illustration and is a two-time winner of the GAMA award for graphic design and art direction.

Myrfors lived in Snohomish, Washington, while working as chief creative officer for Hidden City Games, publisher of the game he created in 2005, Clout Fantasy. He later moved to Mercer Island, Washington, where he works as chief creative officer for Aspect Arts Studio.

== Roleplaying game credits ==
- Talislanta Fantasy Roleplaying Game, 4th Ed. (2001)
  - Publisher: Shooting Iron Design
  - Credit: Interior Artist
- Rage: Warriors of the Apocalypse (Werewolf: The Apocalypse) (1996)
  - Publisher: White Wolf
  - Credit: Interior Artist
- Rapture: The Second Coming (1995)
  - Publisher: Quintessential Mercy Studio
  - Credit: Interior Artist
- The Anarch Cookbook (Vampire: The Masquerade) (1993)
  - Publisher: White Wolf
  - Credit: Interior Artist
- Chicago by Night, 2nd Ed. (Vampire: The Masquerade) (1993)
  - Publisher: White Wolf
  - Credit: Interior Artist
- Knights: Strategies in Motion (Primal Order) (1993)
  - Publisher: Wizards of the Coast
  - Credit: Production Director
- Sentinels (Role Aids) (1993)
  - Publisher: Mayfair Games Inc.
  - Credit: Interior Artist
- Vampire Players Guide, 2nd Ed. (Vampire: The Masquerade) (1993)
  - Publisher: White Wolf
  - Credit: Interior Artist

== Other game credits ==
- Bella Sara 2007
  - Publisher: Hidden City Entertainment
- Clout Fantasy 2005
  - Publisher: Hidden City Entertainment
  - Credit:Creator
- Magic: The Gathering, 9th Ed. (2005)
  - Publisher: Wizards of the Coast
  - Credit: Original Graphic Design
- Magic: The Gathering, 7th Ed. (2001)
  - Publisher: Wizards of the Coast
  - Credit: Original Graphic Design
- Ice Age (Magic: The Gathering) (1995)
  - Publisher: Wizards of the Coast
  - Credit: Art Director and Graphic Design
- Rage (1995)
  - Publisher: White Wolf
  - Credit: Card Art
- Savage Attack (Rage) (1995)
  - Publisher: White Wolf
  - Credit: Interior Artist
- Antiquities (Magic: The Gathering) (1994)
  - Publisher: Wizards of the Coast
  - Credit: Card Art / Art Director
- Eternal Struggle: A Player's Guide to Jyhad (Vampire: The Eternal Struggle) (1994)
  - Publisher: White Wolf
  - Credit: Card Textures
- Legends (Magic: The Gathering) (1994)
  - Publisher: Wizards of the Coast
  - Credit: Card Art / Art Director
- Arabian Nights (Magic: The Gathering) (1993)
  - Publisher: Wizards of the Coast
  - Credit: Card Art / Art Director
