= Nuwisha =

Nuwisha is a 1997 role-playing game supplement published by White Wolf Publishing for Werewolf: The Apocalypse.

== Contents ==
Nuwisha is a supplement in which the werecoyotes are introduced—trickster figures aligned with humor and mischief rather than militant fury. Unlike the stern Garou, Nuwisha battle corruption through fatal pranks and gain renown not for valor, but for wit. The book builds on material from The Werewolf Players Guide, and sets its tone with an introductory comic that hints at future releases. It includes an oral-style historical section, while the depiction of coyotes expands beyond the American West. Creative integration ideas allow Nuwisha to appear in diverse chronicles, including Mage and Changeling.

== Reception ==
Adam Tinworth reviewed Nuwisha for Arcane magazine, rating it an 8 out of 10 overall, and stated that "The lively writing style, interesting and well thought out information and rib-tickling artwork all add up to make an extremely enjoyable and useful supplement. While nobody will be running an entirely Nuwisha-based chronicle, a werecoyote is guaranteed to liven up the dullest of Werewolf games."

== Reviews ==
- Envoyer
