= Mighty MonsterWheelies =

American animated television series

- Created by: Kyel White
- Voices of: Tru Valentino; Grace Lu; Cal Brady; Matt Lowe; Sandra Saad; Chester Rushing; Dee Bradley Baker
- Opening theme: "Mighty MonsterWheelies"
- Ending theme: "Mighty MonsterWheelies" (instrumental)
- Composers: Alex Geringas; Jano Manzali
- Country of origin: United States
- Original language: English
- No. of seasons: 2
- No. of episodes: 52

Production
- Running time: 12–13 minutes
- Production companies: Universal Television; DreamWorks Animation Television

Original release
- Network: Netflix
- Release: October 14, 2024 – May 5, 2025

Mighty MonsterWheelies is an American animated children’s television series inspired by the Universal Monsters, produced by DreamWorks Animation Television for Netflix. The first season was released on Netflix on October 14, 2024. The second season was released on May 5, 2025.

== Premise ==
The series is focused on the titular "Mighty MonsterWheelies", a team of six emergency vehicles with powers and appearances themed after several horror movie monsters from iconic films by Universal Pictures. The team does its best to help out in the town of Motorvania whenever the citizens are in a pinch, called to the job by Mayor Van Helsing ringing the bell atop their garage base.

== Characters ==
=== Main ===
- Tru Valentino as Bolts Frankenstein, a brave and bold Frankenstein's Monster-themed fire engine and the team leader. Bolts' powers are strength-related, and in addition to a water cannon and net, he can extend his ladder arms to reach great distances.
  - Valentino also voices Wyacht, an easygoing catamaran yacht who lives at Blacktop Lagoon.
- Grace Lu as Axyl Bride, an inventive and collected tow truck themed after the Bride of Frankenstein and the team's mechanic. Axyl can swap out parts of her right arm for a different tool, and in addition to her towing rig, lift things with her forklift, she can generate and fire bolts of electricity from her skullcap.
  - Lu also voices Kid Car.
- Cal Brady as Sonnie Dracula, a light-hearted and confident Count Dracula-themed vehicle who can transform between a motorcycle and a helicopter. Sonnie is equipped with a searchlight and tow cable in addition to creating powerful winds via their rotors, and they can detect people through echolocation.
  - Brady also voices Baby Car.
- Matt Lowe as Sweeps Wolfman, a cheery and playful street sweeper and garbage truck hybrid themed after The Wolf Man. In addition to his paws containing sweeper brushes, Sweeps can go much faster than normal to reach others and is a very fast digger.
  - Lowe also voices Subrina's brother, a submersible, a car carrier, and a semi-truck.
- Sandra Saad as Gill. E Creature, a friendly and excitable lifeguard ATV with a submersible mode themed after The Creature from the Black Lagoon. Gill. E is equipped with a grappling hook, creature crawl, and life preserver. In water, she dives and uses her turbo bubbles to go fast, and out of water can drive on vertical surfaces.
  - Saad also voices Mom Car.
- Chester Rushing as Wraps Stretcher, a soft-hearted mummy-themed ambulance and the team's medic. Wraps is capable of deploying a scarab beetle-themed quadcopter named Sand-E to reach others but primarily uses his ability to stretch his arms and wheels to reach others. He uses band aids or bandages to fix holes and pump them up. If there's a dent, he uses a dent popper. He also uses a hot or cold pack, offers them water, uses a thermometer to check if someone's not feeling well, and he can also use bandages as ropes.
  - Rushing also voices Kid Car.
- Dee Bradley Baker as Sparky Sparks, a robot dog and the newest member of the MonsterWheelies.

=== Recurring ===
- "Weird Al" Yankovic as Mayor Van Helsing, a mail truck and the mayor of Motorvania. He is named after the main human protagonist of Dracula, and is the car responsible for alerting the MonsterWheelies with his Monsterwheelies alert phone to any disaster or emergency. Van Helsing is the only character aside from the MonsterWheelies themselves to appear in the series regularly.
- Ozioma Akagha as Briggs Parkington, a parking attendant three-wheeler and deputy mayor of Motorvania and she works for the mayor.
  - Akagha also voices Cabbie, a celebrity singer car, and a pickup truck.
- Scott Menville as Junior Scoots, a young motor scooter who lives in Motorvania.
  - Menville also voices a Balloon Vendor, Motorvanian Green SUV, a Motorvanian Orange Truck, and Passenger 2.
- Kimberly Brooks as Miss Buster, a school bus who works as a teacher in Motorvania.
  - Brooks also voices Subrina, a young submersible who lives under the waters of Blacktop Lagoon.
- Sarah-Nicole Robles as S.S. Rita, a large cargo ship who delivers cargo and passengers to Motorvania from afar.
  - Robles also voices Margoe, a large yellow cargo plane.
- Janell Bass as Ranch Rover Jane, a cowgirl truck who owns 5 broncos.
- Kari Wahlgren as Little Old Lady Car, an old car and with her cat.
  - Wahlgren also voices Subrina's Sister, a submersible, and a semi-truck.
- Darin De Paul as Dr. Jalopy/Mr. Ride, a crawler crane with a wrecking ball and an inventor operating out of the Motorvania junkyard when he goes crazy he’s glasses off and then calms down and put his glasses back on.
  - De Paul also voices Dad Car.
- Samia Mounts as Spinner, a reverse tricycle motorcycle and the leader of the Extreme Riders stunt team.
- Jonah Platt as:
  - Drillbert, a mole drill (mole\minecart hybrid) and Drillette's brother.
  - Flames McGuire, an elderly fire engine and Motorvania's most famous firefighter, and Bolts’ personal hero.
  - Ed, a quiet car who has luck from his cat.
  - Sprocky, a retired blue monster truck and Sweeps' personal hero.
  - Rollbarro Speed, a purple monster truck.
  - Dennis, a large green tracked logging tractor.
  - Alpert Swiss, a skier car and Skiana's father.
- Jentel Hawkins as Drillette, a mole drill (mole\minecart hybrid) and Drillbert's sister.
  - Hawkins also voices Sedanny, a young orange sedan.
- Alison Jaye as Dee Dee, a delivery truck.
- David Errigo Jr. as Revin Revinito, a green car and famous racer.
  - Errigo Jr. also voices the Shopkeeper.
- Krystina Alabado as Wendy Weathervane, a news van and storm chaser who works as Motorvania's weather reporter.
- Kendell Byrd as Skiana Swiss, a car who loves to ski and Alpert's daughter.
- Mia Paige as Carly Cruz, a blind black motorcycle and famous cave explorer who navigates with the help of Tank, her yellow seeing-eye dog sidecar.
- Tom Taylorson as Snowy, a Abominable Snowman-themed snowcraft and Icy's friend.
- Lisa Gilroy as Icy, a Abominable Snowman-themed snowcraft and Snowy's friend.
- Emily Hampshire as Sky, a white skywriter aircraft who led her four skywriter planes to the sky writing show.
- Keith Silverstein as Tyler, a white and blue mail train and Darla’s twin brother.
- Maria Bamford as Darla, a white and purple train and Tyler’s twin sister.
- Mimi Woods as Stella, a yellow and blue jet ski and Gill. E’s personal hero.
- Kimiko Glenn as Star, a young white and light blue UFO.

=== Antagonists ===
Despite having antagonistic characters, the antagonists in the series are typically anti-villains.

- Ashley Park as Phantom Freeze, an ice cream truck themed after The Phantom of the Opera. Phantom Freeze is notorious in Motorvania for controlling others through hypnosis with music played by a built-in pipe organ, typically to make sure that people still desire her ice cream and she snaps her fingers to undo the hypnosis, the only thing she can’t hypnotize is animals.
- Sean Astin as Invisible Van, a white cargo van themed after The Invisible Man. Named after his ability to turn invisible on demand and going visible when he appears, Invisible Van is notoriously narcissistic, often only committing his crimes to serve himself but never deliberately meaning to cause harm to others.

== Episodes ==
=== Series overview ===
Season	Episodes	Originally released
1	26	October 14, 2024
2	26	May 5, 2025

=== Season 1 (2024) ===
No. overall	No. in season	Title	Written by	Original release date
1	1	"Welcome to Motorvania"	Kyel White	October 14, 2024
The team has to save a new family moving into Motorvania when they get lost on the Mountain Road.
2	2	"No Need for Speed"	Annie Nishida	October 14, 2024
Miss Buster's brakes suffer a mysterious mechanical failure, and it's up to the Monsterwheelies to bring her to a stop so Axyl can fix them.
3	3	"Rock, Rock. Who's There?"	Andi Shu Hester	October 14, 2024
Sonnie and Bolts are sent to investigate a mysterious loud noise preventing Motorvanians from sleeping in peace.
4	4	"Escape from the Car Wash"	Andi Shu Hester	October 14, 2024
Gill E. and Sweeps are sent to save Briggs from the Motorvania car wash when it mysteriously begins to malfunction.
5	5	"Heatwave"	Andi Shu Hester	October 14, 2024
During one of the worst heat waves in Motorvanian history, Sonnie is sent to help the citizens reach the safety of the shade. Unfortunately, he got himself overheats while escorting the last one, and the other Monsterwheelies have to try and help him without getting stuck on surfaces superheated by the heat wave.
6	6	"Meteor Shower"	Shari Coleman	October 14, 2024
The entire team is deployed to protect Motorvania when three meteors from a meteor shower make a beeline towards the town.
7	7	"Wild, Wild, WesternWheelies"	Jo Patrick Winters	October 14, 2024
After Briggs and the mayor accidentally scare the broncos off, the Monsterwheelies have to round up Ranch Rover Jane's runaway broncos.
8	8	"Bridging the Gap"	Andi Shu Hester	October 14, 2024
Axyl, Gill E. and Wraps find themselves in a dire situation when Briggs gets stranded on a broken bridge.
9	9	"The Big Bounce"	Andi Shu Hester	October 14, 2024
The Monsterwheelies are deployed to stop a giant bouncy ball accidentally created by Dr. Jalopy, but the ball is much harder to stop than they originally thought.
10	10	"High Fliers and Extreme Riders"	Holly Housen	October 14, 2024
A loose show tent ends up endangering the Extreme Riders before their stunt show can begin, prompting Sonnie and Gill E. to get involved.
11	11	"Let's Get Kraken"	Kalynn Harrington	October 14, 2024
Gill E. is sent to the depths of Blacktop Lagoon to investigate a mysterious distress alarm on the mayor's systems, and she has Crabby and Subrina's full help in finding out.
12	12	"It's Raining Tires"	Andi Shu Hester	October 14, 2024
The Monsterwheelies have to round up a new shipment of tires during a wind storm before the town's big race, but one of the racers ends up making a mistake that requires Sweeps to help him fix.
13	13	"Under Pressure"	Patrick Rieger	October 14, 2024
The team sets out to help Motorvania in the midst of a series of unexplained pipe failures causing the city to flood.
14	14	"The Big Wave"	Andi Shu Hester	October 14, 2024
Gill E. leads the team as they prepare Blacktop Lagoon to be safe before a tidal wave hits, but one ends up needing rescue in the middle of the wave hitting.
15	15	"Solid as a Rock"	Bella Cosper	October 14, 2024
With the other Monsterwheelies out of commission for 24 hours due to their tune-up, Sweeps and Wraps are left to clear a blocked tunnel, but their clashing approaches cause more trouble than initially present.
16	16	"A Case of the Honk-Ups"	Jo Patrick Winters	October 14, 2024
Axyl is sent to fix Mayor Van Helsing’s honk-ups before he is to sing in a talent show, but the mayor's case of the honk-ups may prove to be her most difficult repair job yet.
17	17	"Overheated"	Meghan McCarthy	October 14, 2024
Bolts's attempts to attend to every emergency himself puts him out of action when the constant effort causes him to overheat, forcing him to sit out of the next rescues until he fully recovers.
18	18	"Tossed Out"	Kalynn Harrington	October 14, 2024
Axyl finds herself in a panic when she mistakenly throws out Sweeps's childhood toy, the full moon ball named Larry, but her decision not to tell him right away causes a close call that requires them to call for backup.
19	19	"Lost and Found"	Ellie Guzman	October 14, 2024
Sonnie has to find the other Monsterwheelies & the other motorvanian after the Phantom Freeze hypnotizes everyone.
20	20	"All Shook Up"	Senibo Myers	October 14, 2024
Axyl, Bolts, and Sweeps set out to find out why brand new cases of fizzy waters constantly burst when opened.
21	21	"Marooned"	Melissa Oskouie	October 14, 2024
Gill E. and Wraps are sent to find out why Rita and her passenger, a famous singer, Cabbie, are missing, and upon seeing the Phantom Freeze everyone sets out to bring them home.
22	22	"The Art of Deception"	Kyle White	October 14, 2024
The Invisible Van swipes the various art pieces meant for an art show in Motorvania, and his powers give Sweeps, Bolts, and Sonnie a challenge in trying to catch him.
23	23	"Blown Away"	Kiana Noelle Johnson	October 14, 2024
The Monsterwheelies are paired up to help keep Motorvanians safe in a wind storm, but Sweeps is forced to learn that not every job is a solo job.
24	24	"The Wobbly Lighthouse"	Scott Gray	October 14, 2024
Gill E. and Axyl are sent to help stabilize and fix Blacktop Lagoon lighthouse, but disaster strikes when the only bulb is broken.
25	25	"Haunted Halls"	Jen Bardekoff	October 14, 2024
Motorvania city hall is suddenly becoming haunted, Axyl and Bolts have to uncover the truth behind the supernatural shenanigans.
26	26	"The Creature of Blacktop Lagoon"	Meghan McCarthy	October 14, 2024
Wraps, Gill E. and Bolts are sent to investigate monster sightings at Blacktop Lagoon, and the latter's skepticism on the supernatural are put to the test.

=== Season 2 (2025) ===
No. overall	No. in season	Title	Written by	Original release date
27	1	"This Wheels Wrong"	Robert C. Ramirez and Kyel White	May 5, 2025
Yikes! There's a runaway Ferris wheel on the loose in Motorvania, and it's up to the Monsterwheelies have to stop it before it's too late.
28	2	"Zip Zip Hooray"	Andi Shu Hester	May 5, 2025
When a couple of cars crash while snow skiing, it's up to Axyl, Wraps and Sonnie to lead a mountaintop rescue mission... but what's that rumbling noise?
29	3	"Going Up"	Kiana Noelle Johnson	May 5, 2025
Bolts, Sweeps and Sonnie have to pull off a rescue when a pickup truck is stuck inside a rickety old building needs some help during a big storm.
30	4	"Precious Cargo"	Kiana Noelle Johnson	May 5, 2025
A Margo’s plane door won't close, and heavy crates are falling all over Motorvania! The Monsterwheelies have to act fast before someone gets hurt.
31	5	"WeatherMania"	Joe Winters	May 5, 2025
When a super cloud forms over Motorvania, the Monsterwheelies team up with a brave storm chaser to figure out how to put a stop to the wacky weather.
32	6	"Tank Us Outta Here"	Bella Cosper	May 5, 2025
When legendary cave explorer, Carly Cruz and her loyal guide dog, Tank get lost in a maze of caves, the Wraps and Sonnie have to head underground to rescue them.
33	7	"Keep On Monstertruckin’"	Marty Isenberg	May 5, 2025
The Mighty Monsterwheelies help an aging truck get back into racing shape to compete against some flashy new racers.
34	8	"Out of Power"	Patrick Rieger	May 5, 2025
When Dr. Jalopy accidentally causes all of Motorvania to lose power, Axyl, Sweeps and Sonnie have to race to get the city's power back on.
35	9	"From Mighty to Mini"	Kiana Noelle Johnson	May 5, 2025
After accidentally activating Dr. Jalopy's latest invention, Bolts, Sweeps and Sonnie are miniaturized. How are they going to get back to normal?
36	10	"Lost Geode Road"	Kyel White	May 5, 2025
A sneaky thief known as the Invisible Van puts his criminal ways on pause to help, Bolts, Axyl and Invisible Van off to rescue Mayor Van Helsing.
37	11	"The Trembling"	Ami Boghani	May 5, 2025
After rescuing the Moles, that trapped in the Motorvania junkyard, the Monsterwheelies discover a mysterious rumble coming from below the ground.
38	12	"Where in Motorvania Is Bolts Frankenstein?"	Kalee StClair	May 5, 2025
After Bolts and an Abominable Snowcraft accidentally float away on a block of ice during a rescue, Axyl, Wraps, Sonnie and an Abominable Snowcraft work together to track them down.
39	13	"Sand-E Bugs Out"	Kyel White	May 5, 2025
Wraps calls Monsterwheelies for help when his airborne assistant, Sand-E starts acting strangely.
40	14	"The Junior Rescue Team"	Jim Nolan	May 5, 2025
The Monsterwheelies team up to help three eager-to-please members of the Junior Rescue Team earn their official badges.
41	15	"The Legend of BigTrack"	Johanna Stein	May 5, 2025
Mayor Van Helsing needs the Monsterwheelies's help delivering a package to the tippy top of Carpathian Mountain. Can they level up and get the job done?
42	16	"Bad Luck Boulevard"	Jen Bardekoff	May 5, 2025
Sonnie, Wraps and Sweeps have a wild string of bad luck while chasing a black "cattery" named Duchess Fluffington around Motorvania.
43	17	"No Way Out Park"	Senibo Myers	May 5, 2025
Just as Wraps starts to feel like he's not as important as the other Monsterwheelies, Mayor Van Helsing asks for help with a very specific problem.
44	18	"Scoots to the Rescue"	Jen Bardekoff	May 5, 2025
Scoots really wants to be a Monsterwheelie, but the gang doesn't think he's quite ready. Are there other ways he can help around town?
45	19	"The Race to Space"	Kevin Burke and Chris Wyatt	May 5, 2025
All of Motorvania is excited for the town's new space-themed carnival ride. But when important parts go missing, will the fun stop before lift-off?
46	20	"Interruption Disruption"	Shari Coleman	May 5, 2025
After noticing they have a tendency to interrupt each other when they get excited, the Monsterwheelies try to take turns talking.
47	21	"Playing It Safe"	Annie Nishida	May 5, 2025
When Motorvania decides to hold a parade of lights, the Monsterwheelies pull together to keep the residents safe from traffic accidents.
48	22	"The Great Movie Screen Mystery"	Jim Nolan	May 5, 2025
When a mysterious Bolts-shaped hole appears in Motorvania's movie screen, some wonder if Bolts accidentally caused the damage.
49	23	"Accidental Hero"	Jim Nolan	May 5, 2025
When the Invisible Van starts doing nice things around Motorvania, the Monsterwheelies consider letting him join the team.
50	24	"Trading Places"	Johanna Stein	May 5, 2025
Ice cream truck Phantom Freeze is jealous of Bolts and all the positive attention he receives, so she serves up a plan to take his place as town hero.
51	25	"Bolts Meets His Hero"	Dimitry Pompée	May 5, 2025
Legendary fire truck Flames McGuire returns to Motorvania, where Bolts — his biggest fan — can't wait to meet him.
52	26	"Mystery in the Mists"	Kalynn Harrington	May 5, 2025
An exciting new novel about a famous explorer inspires Axyl and her friends to read together and imagine themselves as book characters.

== Production and development ==
The series was first announced back in 2023, targeted for a young audience's first encounter.

== Reception ==
=== Critical reception ===
MovieGuide.org wrote: "The series' first six episodes have an overall moral and biblical worldview, with the premise of helping those in need, working as a team, and being kind. On the other hand, there is a subtle occult worldview, as the characters resemble traditional Halloween monsters, and even their city has a monster-based name." Fernanda Camago of Common Sense Media wrote: "If your kid loves cars, monsters, and action-packed adventures, it's a solid choice. Characters are kind, the CGI is impressive, and the scripts include instances of emotional intelligence by teaching to stay calm and positive in difficult situations."

=== Accolades ===
Year	Award	Category	Nominee(s)	Result	Ref.
2025	Leo Awards	Best Art Direction in an Animation Series	Garnet Syberg-Olsen (for "Welcome to Motorvania")	Nominated	
