= Werewolfism =

Werewolfism may refer to:

- Lycanthropy, the condition of being a werewolf
- Clinical lycanthropy, a mental disorder in which the patient believes he or she is a werewolf
- Werewolf syndrome, a medical condition characterized by excessive facial and bodily hair

== See also ==
- Werewolf (disambiguation)
