= Gurahl =

Gurahl is a 1998 role-playing game supplement published by White Wolf Publishing for Werewolf: The Apocalypse.

== Contents ==
Gurahl is a supplement which describes the changing breed of Were-bears, known as the Gurahl.

== Reviews ==
- SF Site
- Backstab #14
