= Bella Sara (video game) =

2008 video game

- Box art
- Developer(s): Hidden City Games
- Publisher(s): Codemasters
- Platform(s): Nintendo DS, Windows
- Release: Nintendo DS: EU: October 3, 2008; AU: October 17, 2008; NA: October 28, 2008; Windows: AU: October 17, 2008; NA: October 28, 2008; EU: October 31, 2008
- Genre(s): Life simulation, puzzle

Bella Sara is a life-simulation puzzle video game released for Nintendo DS and Microsoft Windows in North America and the PAL region in October 2008. The game is based on the trading card and website for girls Bella Sara. It will immerse the player in a world filled with fantasy horses, with the ability to ride, care for, accessorize and trade those horses with friends over Wi-Fi. In addition, players will be able to discover secret items, exclusive cards and codes to activate on the official website.

== Reception ==
Jack DeVries of IGN gave Bella Sara a score of 6.5/10, saying that the game is good for enthusiasts of the card trading game but more likely to get everyone else playing it "bored in a week".
