= Mokolé =

Role-playing game supplement

- Publishers: White Wolf Publishing
- Publication: 1999
- Genres: Tabletop role-playing game supplement
- Systems: Storyteller System
- Parent games: Werewolf: The Apocalypse
- Series: World of Darkness
- ISBN: 1-56504-306-5

Mokolé is a 1999 role-playing game supplement for Werewolf: The Apocalypse published by White Wolf Publishing.

== Contents ==
Mokolé is a supplement in which the reptilian Mokolé breed of changers are detailed.

== Reception ==
Mokolé was reviewed in the online second version of Pyramid which said "Mokole and Ratkin are the latest Breedbooks for Werewolf: The Apocalypse. The Breedbooks have succeeded in being very good sourcebooks and very good reads, even if the characters they describe are supposed to be rare as hen's teeth."

== Reviews ==
- Backstab #19
- Dragão Brasil #30 (Sep 1997) p. 40-41
- Dragão Brasil #77 (Aug 2001) p. 4
- Dragão Brasil #84 (Mar 2002) p. 4
