= Rage Across New York =

Role-playing game supplement

Rage Across New York is a 1992 role-playing supplement for Werewolf: The Apocalypse published by White Wolf Publishing.

== Contents ==
Rage Across New York is a supplement in which New York City is detailed as a setting.

== Reception ==
Berin Kinsman reviewed Rage Across New York in White Wolf #37 (July/Aug., 1993), rating it a 4 out of 5 and stated that "Because of the mature themes, I would only suggest this product for serious gamers who feel they can handle the subject matter. Fans of the fear genre in particular should take a look at Rage Across New York to see how effective horror can be done in a game."

== Reviews ==
- Australian Realms #10
- Roleplayer Independent (Volume 1, Issue 6 - May 1993)
- Casus Belli V1 #75 (May-Jun 1993) p. 26
- Casus Belli V1 #94 (May 1996) p. 26-29
- Saga #20 (Mar 1993) p. 5
