= Hengeyokai: Shapeshifters of the East =

Role-playing game supplement

- Publisher: White Wolf Publishing
- Publication date: 1998

Hengeyokai: Shapeshifters of the East is a 1998 role-playing game supplement published by White Wolf Publishing for Werewolf: The Apocalypse.

== Contents ==
Hengeyokai: Shapeshifters of the East is a supplement in which Asian werecreatures are detailed.

== Reviews ==
- Backstab #11 (Sep-Oct 1998) p. 45
- SF Site
- Casus Belli V1 #116 (Oct-Nov 1998) p. 18
- Dragão Brasil #41 (Aug 1998) p. 4
- Dragão Brasil #95 (Feb 2003) p. 6-7
- SF Site
- Dosdediez V2 #6 (Oct 1998) p. 18
- Dosdediez V2 #15 (Aug 2000) p. 17
- Dosdediez V2 #15 (Aug 2000) p. 30
- Lider V3 #6 (Aug 2000) p. 11
