= Book of the Wyrm =

Tabletop role-playing game

- Cover art for the first edition
- Publishers: White Wolf Publishing (ed. 1–2); Onyx Path Publishing (ed. 3)
- Publication: 1993 (ed. 1)
- Genres: Tabletop role-playing game supplement
- Systems: Storyteller System
- Parent games: Werewolf: The Apocalypse
- Series: World of Darkness
- ISBN: 1-56504-041-4 (ed. 1): 1-56504-356-1 (ed. 2)

Book of the Wyrm is a tabletop role-playing game supplement originally released by White Wolf Publishing in 1993 for their game Werewolf: The Apocalypse.

== Contents ==
Book of the Wyrm is a sourcebook containing information on The Wyrm, enemy of the Garou Nation.

== Reception ==
Berin Kinsman reviewed Book of the Wyrm in White Wolf #38 (1993), rating it a 3 out of 5 and stated that "This is an excellent sourcebook, but as much as I think the Wyrm makes a challenging villain, I've also found it to be one of the more contrived elements of the game. Where Vampire took all the various legends about bloodsuckers and forged them into a coherent mythos, Werewolf is made up largely of whole cloth. Because the Storyteller System is horror-based, a Cthulhuoid menace was almost mandatory, but I'd have preferred defining it in a generic accessory, along the lines of the World of Darkness series, to making it an integral part of the Garou mythos."

The reviewer from the online second volume of Pyramid stated that "Starting with a short story entitled "Ill Winds," the book is packed full of attitude, information, and background of the Wyrm. Readers will find inside the history of not only the Black Spiral Dancers, but full tribal information as well. In addition, the corporation of Pentex is described with enough detail to choke a horse."

Alex Lucard reviewed the 20th anniversary edition for DieHard GameFan in 2014, and commented that "Book of the Wyrm is easily the best release for W20 besides the core rulebook so far, and it's also the best release by Onyx Path Publishing this year."

== Reviews ==
- Casus Belli V1 #76 (Jul-Aug 1993)
- Casus Belli V1 #93 (Apr 1996)
- Casus Belli V1 #94 (May 1996)
- Casus Belli V1 #117 (Dec 1998)
