= Rage Across Egypt =

Rage Across Egypt is a 2001 role-playing game supplement published by White Wolf Publishing for Werewolf: The Apocalypse.

== Contents ==
Rage Across Egypt is a supplement in which information is presented on Egypt and the Silent Striders.

== Reviews ==
- Pyramid
- Backstab
- Envoyer #61 (Nov 2001)
- Dosdediez V2 #29 (Jun 2004) p. 22
- D20 #3 p. 14-16
- D20 #4 p. 15-18
