= Bella Sara =

Collectible cards game

- Cardback of the Bella Sara CCG
- Created by: Jesper Myrfors
- Owners: Gitte Brændgaard and the Bella Sara Company, Previously Hidden City Games and Concept Card

Official website
- Official website

Bella Sara was a children's trading card and online game that combined a world of magical horses with game play. Published in the United States by Seattle-based game company Hidden City Entertainment in 2007, Bella Sara began as a trading card game that expanded into an international product line. Having three set releases each year, all trading cards had images of illustrated horses, characters and magical friends with positive, inspirational messages on them. The vision of the company and cards, as created by Gitte Odder was to bring positive messages to empower young girls on the fundamental Philosophy of Life: "We’re all creating our life by our thoughts, attracting the kind of energy we represent."

Each card pack included secret codes that could be redeemed on the website to care for and nurture magical horses online. Select Bella Sara products included these secret codes to expand the magical world. Players could upload cards to redeem tokens that were used to buy merchandise from the online Bazaar.

It was reported June 16, 2013 that the Bella Sara Company would be ceasing all operations and moved from its office in the United States to the creator's home in Denmark.

The company was quiet with no new updates or products until 2020. As of April 2020, the creators have rebooted the website removing all games and replacing them with new content focused around a card collection app. The creator cited that the old functions of the website were not functional by 2020 standards; this coincides with the end of Adobe Flash, upon which the website games were based. Although no update or information has been given on the future direction of the company, an online community is working to restore the website in its entirety.

== History ==
Bella Sara was started in Denmark by Gitte Odder Brændgaard, who intended to create an alternative to other popular trading card games, such as Pokémon and Magic: The Gathering, that would be more suited to girls and lack the element of competition present in the other games. This card game pulled from Gitte Odder's history as a social worker who was caring for mentally disabled young people in Denmark. After the game proved successful in Scandinavia, the cards were released on a trial run to United States consumers in Seattle and San Diego at the end of 2006. Sales during that trial run were high enough to convince retailers to take the cards national in March 2007. The cards continued to grow in popularity with children until the company ceased operations.

== Card availability ==
Cards could be purchased in booster packs, value boxes, and tins, each of which contained a random assortment of cards. Card packs could be purchased online or at a number of retailers worldwide. All cards were published for a limited time in sets. There are eighteen sets of cards, as well as other collectible merchandise. These include:

“First Series” (silver-bordered cards) (October 2006)
64 total cards: 36 common cards, 9 rare cards, 10 energy cards and 9 foil cards with silver background
“Second Series” (light yellow-bordered cards) (March 2007)
124 total cards: 58 common cards, 27 rare cards, 12 energy cards and 27 foil cards with gold background
“Northern Lights” (blue-bordered cards) (July 2007)
72 total cards: 28 common cards, 17 rare cards, 10 energy cards and 17 foil cards with pale blue background
“Ancient Lights” (pink-bordered cards) (October 2007)
72 total cards: 28 common cards, 17 rare cards, 10 energy cards and 17 foil cards with pink background
“Native Lights” (purple-bordered cards) (February 2008)
72 total cards: 28 common cards, 17 rare cards, 10 energy cards and 17 foil cards with textured lavender background
“Magical Friends” (lavender border) (June 2008)
123 total cards: 37 common cards, 37 rare cards, 12 energy cards and 37 foil cards with solid lavender background
“Baby Bella” (green border) (October 2008)
129 total cards: 43 common cards, 37 rare cards, 12 energy (toy) cards and 37 foil cards with green background
“Treasures” (turquoise border) (March 2009)
110 total cards: 55 common cards (5 common "Treasures" cards), 55 foil cards (5 foil "Treasures" cards).
“Royalty” (light purple border) (June 2009)
110 total cards: 55 common cards, 55 foil cards, 5 common energy (treasure) cards and 5 foil energy (treasure) cards.

- “Royalty” was the first set to omit rare cards. From this set forward, rare cards are no longer included and is the first set to include the "Bella Sara Ticket" card in each package. Ticket cards may be gold, silver or copper.
- Each "Bella Sara Ticket" activated awards horses, horseshoes, and prizes to play with in your online cottage.

“Bella's Ball” (orchid border) (October 2009)
110 total cards: 50 common cards, 55 foil cards, 5 character cards.
“Sunflowers” (gold- border) (March 2010)
110 total cards: 45 common cards, 55 foil cards, 10 character cards.
“Moonfairies” (blue border) (June 2010)
110 total cards: 45 common cards, 55 foil cards, 10 story cards.
“Starlights” (light blue border) (October 2010)
110 total cards: 45 common cards, 55 foil cards, 10 story cards.
“Spring Carnival” (mint-green border) (February 2011)
110 total cards: 45 common cards, 55 foil cards, 10 story cards.
“Summer Camp” (yellow border) (May 2011)
110 total cards: 45 common cards, 55 foil cards, 10 story cards.
“Winter Festival” (ice blue border) (October 2011)
110 total cards: 45 common cards, 55 foil cards, 10 story cards.
“Best of Bella Sara” (purple border) (February 2012)
110 total cards: 55 common cards, 55 foil cards.
"Herds from North of North" (yellow orange border) (October 2012)
110 total cards: 55 common cards: 55 foil cards.

Bella Sara cards were available in the United States, Canada, Denmark, Sweden, Norway, Finland, Italy, the United Kingdom, the Netherlands, Germany, France, Luxembourg, Belgium, Switzerland, Spain, Slovakia, the Czech Republic, Croatia, Slovenia, Australia, Mexico, Poland and South Africa.

Bella Sara received numerous awards from child development and parenting authorities, including the “National Parenting Center Seal of Approval” for 2009, the National Parenting Publications "Honors Award" for 2009, the "Toy of the Year" and the “Seal of Excellence” from Creative Child Magazine for 2008 and 2009, the “Excellent Product” and “Outstanding Product” designations from iParenting Media, and the “Best Products” award from Dr. Toy.

== Licensed products ==
Other Bella Sara licensed products include: Bees and Jam sleepwear and intimate apparel, Jakks Pacific toy varieties, Codemasters DS & PC game, Paradise Kids Pose-able Horses, Simply Fun Treasure Trot, HarperCollins Stories and Activity Books, MasterPieces Activities, Trends International Posters, Ultra Pro portfolios, and other international product lines.

== See also ==
- List of fictional horses

== Reviews ==
- Pyramid
