= Chronicle of the Black Labyrinth =

Chronicle of the Black Labyrinth: A Forbidden Tome of Wyrmish Lore is a supplement published by White Wolf Publishing in 1997 for the horror role-playing game Werewolf: The Apocalypse.

== Contents ==
Chronicle of the Black Labyrinth is a 104-page softcover book designed by Sam Inabinet, with artwork by Ron Brown, Mike Chaney, Matt Milberger, John Cobb, Andrew Mitchell Kudelka, and Larry MacDougall. It is written from the point of view of an occultist named Frater, and includes journal entries, collections of lore, and personal memoirs of magic and arcana that all center around the Wyrm and other key concepts in the Werewolf: The Apocalypse game setting.

== Reception ==
In the June 1996 edition of Arcane (Issue 7), Mark Barter was ambivalent about the book, saying it was "Recommended for hardcore Werewolf campaigns only."

In the November 1996 edition of Dragon (Issue #235), Rick Swan thought this book "goes out of its way to flaunt its eccentricity... You've never seen anything like it." Swan admitted that the book did evoke "an atmosphere that is genuinely disturbing." But he concluded by giving the book only an average rating of 4 out of 6, saying, "Much of it borders on the incomprehensible... If you’re a connoisseur of the bizarre, Black Labyrinth belongs in your library, even though it's likely to make your other books recoil in disgust."

== Reviews ==
- Casus Belli V1 #94 (May 1996)
- Envoyer #33 (Jul 1999)
- Envoyer #34 (Aug 1999)
