= Wendigo Tribebook =

1998 role-playing game supplement for Werewolf: The Apocalypse

Wendigo Tribebook is a 1998 role-playing game supplement published by White Wolf Publishing for Werewolf: The Apocalypse.

== Contents ==
Wendigo Tribebook is a supplement in which the Wendigo tribe is detailed.

== Reviews ==
- Backstab #11 (Sep–Oct 1998) p. 37
- SF Site
- Backstab #47 (Mar–May 2004) p. 45
- Dragão Brasil #89 (Aug 2002) p. 6
- SF Site
