= Werewolf: Conspicuous Consumption =

1995 novel by Stewart Wieck

Werewolf: Conspicuous Consumption is a novel written by Stewart Wieck under the pseudonym Stewart von Allmen, published by Boxtree Ltd in 1995.

== Plot summary ==
Werewolf: Conspicuous Consumption is a Werewolf: The Apocalypse novel in which a group werewolves has formed a pack, and work to defend a small cairn located nearby the Midwestern town of Little River.

== Reception ==
Andy Butcher reviewed Werewolf: Conspicuous Consumption for Arcane magazine, rating it a 5 out of 10 overall. Butcher comments that "It's not that Conspicuous Consumption is a bad book – it's just not a great one."

== Reviews ==
- Review by John D. Owen (1996) in Vector 189
