= Silent Striders Tribebook =

Silent Striders Tribebook is a 1996 role-playing game supplement published by White Wolf Publishing for Werewolf: The Apocalypse.

== Contents ==
Silent Striders Tribebook is a supplement in which the nomadic, secretive messengers known as the Silent Striders are detailed. The tribe is characterized as wanderers haunted by the dead, with roots tracing back to ancient Egypt and a deep animosity toward the Followers of Set. They are portrayed as cultural outsiders, aligned with Romani traditions and steeped in storytelling, secret languages, and spiritual journeys. Structured around the education of a Strider pup, the book mixes narrative shifts—campfires, roadways, spirit realms—to echo the tribe's transient lifestyle. It includes sections on history, culture, travel encounters, mechanics, and a tribal weakness. A comic strip adds to the supplement, and the appendices provide gifts, totems, and character templates.

== Reception ==
Mark Barter reviewed Silent Striders Tribebook for Arcane magazine, rating it a 7 out of 10 overall, and stated that "The style is informal and easy to read without being flippant, and a strong vein of dark humour is very welcome. This is a sound piece of work, clearly laid out, full of good ideas and dark moody artwork. It brings colour to one of the most elusive tribes, and after reading this | wanted to play one."

== Reviews ==
- Fractal Spectrum (Issue 15 - Spring 1997)
- Ringbote (Issue 13 - Jul/Aug 1997)
- Dosdediez V2 #3 (Dec 1997) p. 15
- D20 #12 p. 6-7
