= A Romance of Old Baghdad =

1922 film

- Directed by: Kenelm Foss
- Based on: Miss Haroun al Rashid by Jessie Douglas Kerruish
- Starring: Matheson Lang; Manora Thew; Roy Travers
- Production company: Astra Films
- Distributed by: Astra Films
- Release date: March 1922
- Country: United Kingdom

A Romance of Old Baghdad is a 1922 British silent drama film directed by Kenelm Foss and starring Matheson Lang, Manora Thew and Roy Travers. It is an adaptation of the novel Miss Haroun al Rashid by Jessie Douglas Kerruish. In nineteenth century Mesopotamia a series of romantic entanglements ensue. The Hollywood actress Evelyn Brent was originally intended to star but did not ultimately appear in the finished film.

== Cast ==
- Matheson Lang as Prince Omar
- Manora Thew as Sourna
- Roy Travers as Harvey P. Wilbur
- Henry Victor as Horne Jerningham
- George Bellamy as General Walters
- Barbara Everest as Mrs Jocelyn
- A. Harding Steerman as Mr Jocelyn
- Douglas Munro as Abdul Bey
- Clyne Dacia as Rathia
- George Foley as Kadi
- Rolf Leslie as Haji
- Victor McLaglen as Miski
- Jack Minister as Piers Blessington
- Lorna Rathbone as Evelyn Jerningham
- Beatie Olna Travers as Salti

== Bibliography ==
- Kear, Lynn & King, James. Evelyn Brent: The Life and Films of Hollywood's Lady Crook. McFarland & Co, 2009.
