= Werewolf Storytellers Companion =

2001 role-playing game supplement

Werewolf Storytellers Companion is a 2001 role-playing game supplement published by White Wolf Publishing for Werewolf: The Apocalypse.

== Contents ==
Werewolf Storytellers Companion is a supplement in which Stargazers, other Fera, caern and sept life, antagonists, weapons, Renown, and more are expanded, and includes a four-panel reference screen to streamline running the game.

== Reviews ==
- Rue Morgue #20
- Backstab #28
- Casus Belli V1 #112 (Feb-Mar 1998) p. 14
- Envoyer #52 (Feb 2001)
- D20 #4 p. 18-19
- D20 #12 p. 7-8
