= Guardians of the Caerns =

Guardians of the Caerns is a 2000 role-playing game supplement published by White Wolf Publishing for Werewolf: The Apocalypse.

== Contents ==
Guardians of the Caerns is a supplement in which the sacred spaces of the Garou are detailed.

== Reviews ==
- Pyramid
- Backstab
