= Rage: Warriors of the Apocalypse =

Role-playing game supplement

Rage: Warriors of the Apocalypse is a 1996 role-playing game supplement for Werewolf: The Apocalypse published by White Wolf Publishing.

== Contents ==
Rage: Warriors of the Apocalypse is a sourcebook which contains Werewolf: The Apocalypse game statistics as well as background information for characters featured in the Rage collectible card game, and for other Werewolf characters.

== Reception ==
Mark Barter reviewed Rage: Warriors of the Apocalypse for Arcane magazine, rating it a 6 out of 10 overall. Barter comments that "The quality of the material deserves a higher rating, but the questionable value for money knocks off a couple of points."

== Reviews ==
- Dragon #234 (Oct 1996)
