= Red Talons Tribebook =

1995 RPG supplement

Red Talons Tribebook is a 1995 role-playing game supplement for Werewolf: The Apocalypse published by White Wolf Publishing.

== Contents ==
Red Talons Tribebook is a supplement which provides the history of the tribe with their customs and beliefs, as well as unique abilities and templates that can be used for members of the tribe.

== Reception ==
Mark Barter reviewed Red Talons Tribebook for Arcane magazine, rating it a 7 out of 10 overall. Barter comments that "This material is not essential to play the game, but it brings more life and colour to the most intriguing of the tribes. You, a human, will play the role of a wolf who lives to slaughter humans in revenge for their slaughter of wolves, and see your own species from a different perspective. For me, this is the epitome of what makes roleplaying so challenging and inspiring."

== Reviews ==
- Dragão Brasil #58 (Jan 2000)
- Australian Realms #29
