= Wolf Girl =

Wolf Girl may refer to:

- Wolf Girl (film), a 2001 Canadian/Romanian horror film
- Wolf Girl (band), an indie pop band from London, England
- Wolf Girl and Black Prince, a Japanese shōjo manga series written by Ayuko Hatta
- WLFGRL, a 2014 album by Machine Girl

== See also ==
- Wolf (disambiguation)
- Wolf man (disambiguation)
- Werewolf (disambiguation)
- Princess Mononoke, film in which a girl is raised by wolves
