= Valkenburg Foundation =

Valkenburg Foundation is a 1993 role-playing adventure for Werewolf: The Apocalypse published by White Wolf Publishing.

== Plot summary ==
Valkenburg Foundation is an adventure in which an asylum in the Wyoming wilderness is used to treat Garou madness.

== Reception ==
Berin Kinsman reviewed Valkenburg Foundation in White Wolf #38 (1993), rating it a 5 out of 5 and stated that "I was very pleased with Valkenburg Foundation. There are some tales well worth telling here, and it's a nice change of pace from the overt 'Wyrm menace of the week' cliché. Although it wasn't left open for one, I'd like to see a sequel."

== Reviews ==
- Saga #20 (Mar 1993) p. 5
