= Jessie Douglas Kerruish =

British writer (1884–1949)

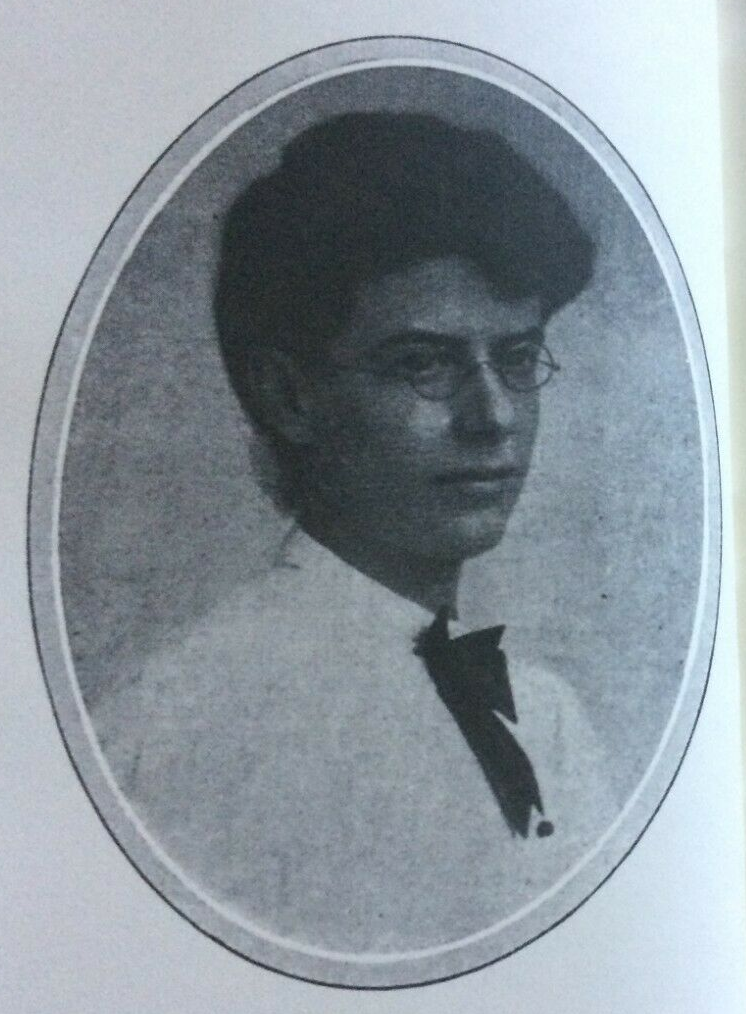
- Born: 1884; Seaton Carew
- Died: 1949 (aged 64–65); Hove
- Occupation: Writer

Jessie Douglas Kerruish (1884 – 1949) was a British writer best known for her werewolf novel The Undying Monster: A Tale of the Fifth Dimension (1922), which was adapted for film as The Undying Monster (1942).

== Early life ==
Jessie Douglas Kerruish was born in 1884 in Seaton Carew, County Durham, England. Her father was Manx.

== Career ==
Kerruish's earliest known publication is the story "Lancelot James and the Dragon" in The Novel Magazine in 1907. She published frequently in the Weekly Tale-Teller and perhaps other publications edited by Isabel Thorne for Shurey's Publications. Many were supernatural stories like "The Swaying Vision" (1915), about a scrying sorcerer, and the horror story "The Swaying Vision" (1915). (The extent of Kerruish's work in these periodicals is unknown because many were lost during the World War II bombings of England.)

Kerruish won first prize in Hodder & Stoughton's "One Thousand Guineas Novel Competition" for her debut novel, Miss Haroun al-Raschid (1917). It was adapted as the silent film A Romance of Old Baghdad (1922). She followed this with other middle eastern-themed fantasy works, the novel The Girl from Kurdistan (1918) and the story collection Babylonian Nights' Entertainment: A Selection of Narratives from the Text of Certain Undiscovered Cuneiform Tablets (1934).

Later in her career she contributed short stories to the Not at Night anthologies by Christine Campbell Thomson, including "The Wonderful Tune" (1931) and "The Seven-Locked Room" (1933), the latter about the discovery of the Holy Grail. She also continued to publish in magazines like 20-Story Magazine.

== Bibliography ==
- The Raksha Rajah; or, The King of the Ogres (for children), [London, England], c. 1911.
- Miss Haroun al-Raschid (novel), Hodder & Stoughton (London), 1917.
- The Girl from Kurdistan (novel), Hodder & Stoughton, 1918.
- The Undying Monster: A Tale of the Fifth Dimension (novel), Heath Cranton (London), 1922, Macmillan (New York City), 1936.
- Babylonian Nights' Entertainment: A Selection of Narratives from the Text of Certain Undiscovered Cuneiform Tablets, Archer (London), 1934.
