= Werewolf: The Apocalypse – Earthblood =

2021 video game

- Key art, featuring Cahal
- Developer: Cyanide
- Publisher: Nacon
- Director: Julien Desourteaux
- Writers: Martin Ericcson; Caroline Froment; Simon Decottignies Renard
- Series: Werewolf: The Apocalypse
- Engine: Unreal Engine 4
- Platforms: Microsoft Windows; PlayStation 4; PlayStation 5; Xbox One; Xbox Series X/S
- Release: February 4, 2021
- Genre: Action role-playing
- Mode: Single-player

Werewolf: The Apocalypse – Earthblood is a 2021 action role-playing game developed by Cyanide and published by Nacon. The game is based on White Wolf Publishing's tabletop role-playing game Werewolf: The Apocalypse, and is part of the larger World of Darkness series. The story follows Cahal, an eco-terrorist werewolf who has been banished from his werewolf tribe, and who fights against the Pentex corporation and the pollution it causes. The player, as Cahal, traverses areas in the American Northwest, and can shapeshift into a wolf, human or werewolf form to perform various tasks, such as exploration, conversation and combat.

Werewolf: The Apocalypse – Earthblood was released for PlayStation 4, PlayStation 5, Windows, Xbox One, and Xbox Series X/S on February 4, 2021. The game received generally mixed reviews from critics.

== Gameplay ==
Werewolf: The Apocalypse – Earthblood is a third-person, single-player action role-playing game in which the player takes the role of an eco-terrorist werewolf named Cahal. The player explores various areas in the American Northwest, in the form of large hub worlds. Within these areas, the player plays through missions, which may have effects on the game world, including leading to secondary missions getting unlocked. The player also goes to Penumbra, a place between the physical world and the spirit world, where they can receive sidequests or challenges from the Great Spirit of the Waterfall, who gives the player rewards for completing them, such as opening shortcuts between areas.

Cahal, who is a werewolf and shapeshifter, and can take on the forms of a wolf and a human in addition to his werewolf form. Each form has its own gameplay mechanics tied to it: the wolf form is used for exploration, tracking, spying, and stealth, as well as being able to pass through narrow passages; the human form is used for interactions, such as using machines and conversing with people; and the werewolf form is used for combat. When in the human form, other characters are not aware that the player character really is a werewolf, allowing the player to go undercover. The player develops the werewolf through a skill tree, where they can choose between different archetypes connected to different weaknesses and strengths. The player also has access to various supernatural power-ups, which are drawn from nature.

The gameplay involves management of the player character's rage: the werewolf's rage rises as he learns about problems humans have caused, such as pollution and greed. If the player lets the werewolf's rage overflow, the werewolf will enter a frenzy state and turn into a violent, monstrous beast. When in the frenzy state, the werewolf is more powerful, but also finds it more difficult to parse information, such as whether a character is an enemy or an innocent, and will draw the attention of enemies. Once in the frenzy state, the only way to break out of it is to kill all who are present, regardless of if they are enemies or not.

== Synopsis ==
=== Setting ===
Earthblood takes place in the American Northwest, and is set in the World of Darkness, where supernatural beings, such as vampires and werewolves, secretly struggle for power. The world is ruled by three entities: the Wyld, a chaotic, creative force that creates life and oversees nature; the Weaver, which is tasked to give form to the Wyld's creativity, organizing Earth; and the Wyrm, which originally existed as a balancing force between the Wyld and the Weaver, originally a force of breakdown and renewal, but which has become like a black hole trying to destroy everything due to how powerful the Weaver has gotten, and which corrupts humans easily.

The game focuses on werewolves, known as Garou, whose nation consists of thirteen tribes called the Garou Nation. Whereas vampires integrate into human societies, werewolves are recluses, and are portrayed as the "immune system of the planet", working to protect nature. Different tribes have different views on how to achieve this and how to deal with humanity: for example, the Glass Walkers think that humanity can get out of environmental problems with the use of technology; the Black Furies fight for feminism, women's rights and gender equality; the Bone Gnawers care about social class and fight for economically oppressed people; and the Red Talons would like to wage war against humanity to see who will survive. Due to their varying perspectives, there is a lot of in-fighting between the tribes.

=== Plot ===
The game follows the werewolf Cahal, a member of the familial Fianna tribe of Irish werewolves, who are fighting against an oil subsidiary called Endron, whose president, Richard Wadkins; willingly serves the Wyrm to disrupt the balance of Gaia. In one of their missions, Cahal, along with his packmates, Cahal's brother-in-law Rodko, Ava, and his wife Ludmilla infiltrate an Endron facility. Their plan tampers with the data of their oil extraction and force them to pull out of the region. During the raid, Ludmilla is killed, and Cahal soon accidentally kills another packmate, Rafiq; and partially blinds Rodko. Ashamed, Cahal leaves the pack.

Five years later, Cahal works freelance. After a raid on an energy corp in Washington State, Cahal returns to his homeland in Tarker's Mill, along with his partner, Dusk. There he finds his former tribe is at war with Endron's militia, led by Major Graner. After fighting off an attack that injures Rodko, Cahal is sent to dismantle an Endron training center before reuniting with his daughter Aedana. He learns that Ava has founded the human eco-terrorist group Lambda Mankind, who are operating to dismantle Endron from within. They discover that Endron has created a new toxin called Earthblood, used to mutate their militia into super-soldiers.

While a new raid is planned to expose Endron, Aedana is kidnapped by Wadkins, and Rodko gives into his rage. Cahal is forced to kill Rodko when the two transform and fight. Wadkins reveals that he allowed the pack's espionage so that he could kidnap Aedana. Cahal manages to kill Graner, driving the Wyrm from his homeland. Cahal plans to rescue Aedana by infiltrating a prison in Nevada, where Erdron is conducting experiments on inmates.

In Nevada, Cahal escapes the prison with a werewolf named Onawa, regrouping with her Red Talon tribe who are at stalemate in their own war with Endron. He learns that Aedana was taken to Endron headquarters. Upon infiltrating the facility with Lambda Mankind's assault, Wadkins releases Earthblood gas, causing environmental damage, and mutating the Lambda Mankind activists. Wadkins is able to escape when a Red Talon werewolf attacks Cahal; Onawa reveals she is working for Endron in exchange for her pack's safety. Their guardian spirit has also been infected by Wyrm, but they are freed from its influence when Cahal bests them in battle.

Tracking Aedana down to an Endron oil rig, Cahal regroups with Ava and learns of Endron's plans to spread the Wyrm by releasing Earthblood as an alternative to oil. In the final siege, Cahal finds Aedana is heavily mutated by Wadkin's experiments. Cahal is forced to mercy kill his daughter; she dies in his arms. Cahal is presented with a choice to take revenge on Watkins, or save Ava and the activists from Endron's militia.

If Cahal chooses to confront Watkins, he corners the CEO, who mutates himself with Earthblood. Cahal manages to kill Watkins after a fight but discovers that Ava and her team have been slaughtered. Cahal manages to destroy the facility with explosives, postponing Earthblood's release. Lambda Mankind and the pack are denounced as terrorists by the media. If Cahal saves Ava, Wadkins flees the rig while Cahal and Ava bring down the facility. The media has a much better reception of the group and Endron publicly abandons its plans after discovering Wadkin's actions, forcing him into hiding. Regardless of the ending, it is implied that Endron's leadership, Pentex, plans to continue Wadkins' research.

== Development and release ==
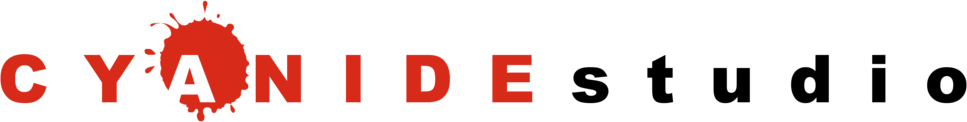
The game was developed by Cyanide.

Werewolf: The Apocalypse – Earthblood was developed by Cyanide in the game engine Unreal Engine 4, with cooperation from White Wolf Publishing to help make the game stay true to White Wolf's Werewolf: The Apocalypse tabletop role-playing game that Earthblood is based on. The game is directed by Julien Desourteaux, with Martin Ericsson serving as lead writer. The entire level design team from Cyanide's earlier game Styx: Shards of Darkness also worked on Earthblood, and there were according to Desourteaux a lot of things carrying over from Shards of Darkness into Earthblood, although they had to develop combat from scratch.

Prior to the start of development of the game, the developers considered various genres for an adaptation of Werewolf: The Apocalypse, such as a brawler or an isometric role-playing game, before deciding on an action role-playing game. Early questions they asked, that would form the game, included "When will you rage?", "When will you use violence?", "When will you have had enough?", and "What is the price of changing the world through violence?"; they wanted to avoid giving out answers considered correct, and wanted to let the player think about it for themselves and come up with answers.

According to Desourteaux, this question of rage management is the main theme of the game; a branching narrative was considered to facilitate the exploration of these questions, but eventually the developers decided on a largely linear story with minor branches. Ericsson described the game as being strongly focused on its narrative, and therefore having a defined protagonist, and a fixed story with themes such as family, estrangement, cynicism, and idealism.

Pre-production of the game began around late 2016, following Paradox Interactive's purchase of White Wolf in 2015.

In January 2017, Paradox Interactive AB announced the video game's partnership with Focus Home Interactive, under the title Werewolf: The Apocalypse – The Official Video Game. The game was originally to be published by Focus Home Interactive, but switched publishers to Nacon in 2018 following Nacon's purchase of Cyanide. It was presented for the first time at E3 2019 in Los Angeles in June 2019, and was exhibited at PDXCON 2019 in October.

In June 2019, the game's release title was changed to Werewolf: The Apocalypse – Earthblood. Werewolf: The Apocalypse – Earthblood was released for PlayStation 4, PlayStation 5, Windows, Xbox One, and Xbox Series X/S on February 4, 2021.

== Reception ==
Reception

Aggregate score
Aggregator	Score
Metacritic	56/100 (PC); 42/100 (PS4); 54/100 (PS5); 58/100 (XSXS)

Review scores
Publication	Score
Destructoid	5/10
Game Informer	5/10
IGN	4/10
PC Gamer (US)	79/100
PCGamesN	4/10
Push Square	5/10
RPGamer	2.5/5
VentureBeat	3/5

Werewolf: The Apocalypse – Earthblood received positive previews at E3 2019, with Paste calling it one of their favorites of the show. However, upon launch the game received "mixed or average" reviews from critics for most platforms, except for the PlayStation 4 version which received "generally unfavorable" reviews, according to review aggregator website Metacritic.

IGN gave the game a negative review saying, "Werewolf: The Apocalypse – Earthblood has decent stealth going for it, but its weak story forces you into painfully mediocre combat too often to be worthwhile." Destructoid liked the game's combat, but felt the mission design and stealth was repetitive, with the reviewer stating that the game felt like "around 10 to 12 hours of the exact same stealth mission". Eurogamer wrote that the game itself was fine, but heavily criticized the plot of the game, writing that Earthblood had "A lacklustre story and characters that are so superficial, it's hard to forge any emotional connections with any of them". PC Gamer enjoyed the werewolf form, liking the intensity it brought to fights, writing "Combat is rather simple—AI isn't exactly Deep Blue level, and it's a bit button-bashy—but dammit it's fun". PCGamesN felt that low-quality character models and environments brought the game down, while the music looped "endlessly until you clear out each section of a level".

In a review of Werewolf: The Apocalypse – Earthblood in Black Gate, Andrew Zimmerman Jones said "Overall, it is great to see one of my favorite roleplaying games realized this completely in a video game format. With two kids, I am rarely the one who picks the video games or gets time in front of the Xbox, but I’ve definitely enjoyed claiming it to get a chance at this game. Both my kids, who have never played Werewolf as an RPG, also enjoyed the video game. It really has something for everyone."
