= Werewolf (disambiguation) =

A werewolf, in folklore, is a mythical being described as a person who shapeshifts into a wolf-like creature during the nights of a full moon.

Werewolf may also refer to:

== Film ==
- The Werewolf (1913 film), a 1913 American silent film
- The Werewolf (1956 film), a 1956 American film
- Werewolf (1996 film), a direct-to-video horror film featured on Mystery Science Theater 3000
- Werewolf (2016 film), a 2016 Canadian film
- Werewolf, a 2018 Polish film screened at the 2019 Toronto After Dark Film Festival
- Werewolves (film), a 2024 action horror film
- Werwulf, 2026 gothic horror film by Robert Eggers, set in 13th-century England

== Television ==
=== Episodes ===
- "Werewolf", Barney Miller season 3, episode 6 (1976)
- "Werewolf", Digimon Ghost Game episode 35 (2022)
- "Werewolf", Lost Tapes season 2, episode 4 (2009)
- "Werewolf", Roger Ramjet season 2, episode 1 (1966)
- "Werewolf", So Weird season 2, episode 8 (1999)
- "Werewolf", Superboy season 3, episode 19 (1991)
- "Werewolf", Undead Murder Farce episode 9 (2023)
- "Werewolf", Voyage to the Bottom of the Sea season 3, episode 2 (1966)
- "Werewolves", CSI: Crime Scene Investigation season 6, episode 11 (2006)
- "Werewolves", In Search of... (2002) episode 3a (2002)
- "Werewolves", Murdoch Mysteries season 2, episode 12 (2009)
- "Werewolves", Mystery Hunters season 1, episode 17a (2002)
- "The Werewolf", Kolchak: The Night Stalker episode 5 (1974)
- "The Werewolf", Tracy Beaker Returns series 1, episode 11 (2010)

=== Shows ===
- Werewolf (TV series), an American horror series on Fox network from 1987

== Music ==
- "Werewolf", a song by Fiona Apple from The Idler Wheel...
- "Werewolf", a song by Michael Hurley from Armchair Boogie, covered by Cat Power on You Are Free
- "Werewolf", a song by CocoRosie
- "Werewolf", a song by the Five Man Electrical Band
- "Werewolf", a song by Krokus from Pain Killer
- "Werewolf", a song by Lil Uzi Vert featuring Bring Me the Horizon from Pink Tape, 2023
- "The Werewolf", a song by Paul Simon from Stranger to Stranger
- The Werewolfs, a band featuring Derf Scratch

== Literature ==
=== Comics ===
- Werewolf (Dell Comics), a 1966-1967 character
- Werewolf by Night, a Marvel Comics character debuting in 1972
- Werewolf (DC Comics), a comics supervillain in the DC Universe

=== Fiction ===
- The Were-wolf, an 1896 novel by Clemence Housman
- The Werewolf (French: Le Loup-garou), a 1924 novel by Alfred Machard
- Werewolf, a 1926 novel by Max Brand
- The Werewolf (Danish: Varulven), a 1958 novel by Aksel Sandemose
- "The Werewolf", a short story featured in The Bloody Chamber and Other Stories, a 1979 collection by Angela Carter
- Werewolf!, a 1979 short story anthology edited by Bill Pronzini
- Werewolf: Horror Stories of the Man-Beast, a 1987 short story anthology edited by Peter Haining
- Werewolf, a 2001 World of Darkness novel by Gherbod Fleming; the third installment in the Predator & Prey series

=== Non-fiction ===
- The Werewolf, a 1933 treatise by Montague Summers
- Werewolf: A True Story of Demonic Possession, a 1991 non-fiction book by Ed Warren

== Games ==
- Werewolf (social deduction game), a party game
- Werewolf: The Apocalypse, a role-playing game
  - Werewolf: The Forsaken, a role-playing game, its successor
- Werewolf: The Last Warrior, a video game for Nintendo Entertainment System
- Werewolf (Dungeons & Dragons), a lycanthrope in the Dungeons & Dragons game
- Werewolf, a video game, part of a 1995 compilation Werewolf vs. Comanche

== Other uses ==
- Kamov Ka-50, a helicopter
- VMFA-122, a U.S. Marine Corps squadron
- Libahunt ("The Werewolf"), a 1912 Estonian play written by August Kitzberg
- Werewolf, a codename for a Fedora operating system release
- Werewolf, a variant of the Wolfsangel symbol

== See also ==
- Werwolf, a plan for a Nazi commando unit for the defence of Germany
- Werewolf syndrome, an abnormal amount of hair growth over the body
- Wolf man (disambiguation)
- Wolf Girl (disambiguation)
