= The Undying Monster =

1942 American mystery horror film by John Brahm

- Theatrical release poster
- Directed by: John Brahm
- Screenplay by: Lillie Hayward; Michel Jacoby
- Based on: The Undying Monster by Jessie Douglas Kerruish
- Produced by: Bryan Foy
- Starring: James Ellison; Heather Angel; John Howard
- Cinematography: Lucien Ballard
- Edited by: Harry Reynolds
- Music by: David Raksin
- Distributed by: Twentieth Century-Fox
- Release date: November 27, 1942
- Running time: 63 minutes
- Country: United States
- Language: English

The Undying Monster, also known as The Hammond Mystery, is a 1942 American mystery horror film directed by John Brahm and written by Lillie Hayward and Michel Jacoby, based on Jessie Douglas Kerruish's 1922 novel of the same name. The film stars James Ellison, Heather Angel and John Howard, and focuses on a series of mysterious deaths within the wealthy Hammond family.

== Plot ==
In the coastal chalk hills of southeast England, the Hammond family home has been cursed since the Crusades, with family members dying or committing suicide under mysterious circumstances. Now, at the turn of the century, twenty years after the last Hammond casualty, two people, including Oliver Hammond, are attacked by an unknown creature. A Scotland Yard scientist, Robert Curtis, and his sidekick Christy are dispatched to investigate. Although the local townspeople are convinced that the attacks are the result of the curse of Hammond Hall - "When stars are bright on a frosty night, Beware thy bane in the rocky lane" - Curtis seeks a more scientific explanation.

Curtis' investigation at the Hammond household reveals a number of unusual circumstances, including slamming doors and clanking chains, a recently entered secret room supposedly locked for years, and a statue of a strange dog-like creature in the Hammond family crypt. During his investigation, one of the initial victims of the attack dies (after being in a coma), and the case is sent to a coroner's jury for judgement. Upon hearing testimony from members of the Hammond family and their associates, the jury rules that the victim died at the hand of an unknown person or creature of unknown species.

After the ruling, Curtis looks for evidence upon the victim's body. He finds a hair that he later identifies as a wolf's, but the hair disappears mysteriously soon after he analyzes it. The monster attacks again, this time kidnapping Helga Hammond, but Curtis and the police chase him down. When shot, the monster transforms into Oliver Hammond.

Afterward, Dr. Jeff Colbert, a friend of the Hammonds, reveals that they have been afflicted with lycanthropy for generations — that is, they are werewolves — and he had been attempting to cure them of the disease. He also explains that the deaths and suicides are so that the family do not harm innocent people.

== Cast ==
- James Ellison as Robert Curtis
- Heather Angel as Helga Hammond
- John Howard as Oliver Hammond
- Bramwell Fletcher as Dr. Jeff Colbert
- Heather Thatcher as Christy
- Aubrey Mather as Inspector Craig
- Halliwell Hobbes as Walton the butler
- John Rogers as Tom Clagpool
- Matthew Boulton as Coroner
- Holmes Herbert as Chief Constable

== Production and release ==
Production started in August 1942 with retakes early in September the same year.

The film was released to the theaters in the United States on 27 November 1942. The Hollywood Reporter explained that Twentieth Century-Fox had planned to release The Undying Monster so as to exhibit it on a double bill with Dr. Renault's Secret. On Kino Lorber's 2016 Blu-ray of the movie, the full story of its production and release is told by audio commentators Tom Weaver, Robert J. Kiss and Sumishta Brahm, the latter the daughter of its director John Brahm.

== Reception ==
Modern response for The Undying Monster has been mixed to positive. Film critic Leonard Maltin awarded the film two and a half out of four stars, commending the film's atmospheric photography while also stating that it added nothing new to the genre. Dennis Schwartz of Ozus' World Movie Reviews gave the film an A−, praising the film for its atmosphere, cinematography, and suspense, calling it "[a] Superior telling of a werewolf". Schwartz's only criticism was directed towards the film's comedy relief, which he felt was unnecessary. Time Out magazine commended the film's atmosphere, cinematography, performances, and direction, while also criticizing the film's plot. Chris Coffel from Dread Central offered the film similar praise, while also commending the film's mystery aspects and plot, favorably comparing it to Universal Horror films.

Alternately, Stuart Galbraith IV from DVD Talk stated that, while it featured great atmosphere, and was well-made and directed, overall the film was "disappointing" due to its less than stellar cast and illogical plot twist. Michael Barrett of PopMatters rated the film a mixed score of five out of ten stars. In his review, Barrett pointed out that the film's title monster as the film's major fault, stating that special effects used to for the monster were ineffective and of poor quality, and the final explanation of the family "curse" was unsatisfactory. TV Guide gave the film two out of five stars, stating that while the film contained effectively "eerie atmosphere" and great location work, it was still just a knock off of Universal's Wolf Man.

== Sources ==
- Meehan, Paul (2010). Horror Noir: Where Cinema's Dark Sisters Meet. McFarland & Company. ISBN 978-0-7864-4597-4.
