= The Werewolf Players Guide =

Role-playing game supplement

- Publisher: White Wolf Publishing
- Publication date: 1993

The Werewolf Players Guide is a 1993 role-playing game supplement published by White Wolf Publishing for Werewolf: The Apocalypse.

== Contents ==
The Werewolf Players Guide is a supplement for players to use for their Garou player characters.

== Reviews ==
- SF Site
- Backstab #9 (May-Jun 1998) p. 53
- Casus Belli V1 #94 (May 1996) p. 26-29
- Dragon #210 (Oct 1994) p. 91-92
- The Last Province (Issue 5 - Aug / Sept 1993)
- Dragão Brasil #26 (May 1997) p. 38-39
- Dragão Brasil #34 (Jan 1998) p. 48-49
- Dragão Brasil #39 (Jun 1998) p. 3
- Dragão Brasil #58 (Jan 2000) p. 3
- Dragão Brasil #60 (Mar 2000) p. 2
- Australian Realms #11 (May-Jun 1993) p. 44
- Australian Realms #13 (Sep-Oct 1993) p. 5
- Magia i Miecz #1999-05 p. 8
- DXP #2 (Apr 2000) p. 2
- Dosdediez V2 #4 (Apr 1998) p. 16
- Dosdediez V2 #6 (Oct 1998) p. 15
- Dosdediez V2 #6 (Oct 1998) p. 24
- La Runa #3 (Jan-Mar 1999) p. 12
- The Last Province #5 (Aug-Sep 1993) p. 8
