= Wolf man =

Wolf man or Wolfman may refer to:

- A werewolf, also known as a lycanthrope

== Arts and entertainment ==
=== Film ===
- The Wolf Man (1924 film), a silent drama
- The Wolf Man (franchise), a horror film series
  - The Wolf Man (1941 film)
  - The Wolfman (film), 2010, a remake of the 1941 film
  - Wolf Man (2025 film), a reboot of The Wolf Man franchise
- The Wolfman, a 2007 documentary film about British wolf researcher Shaun Ellis

=== Other uses in arts and entertainment ===
- Wolfman (video game), 1988
- Tooth and Nail (novel) originally entitled Wolfman, a 1992 Inspector Rebus novel by Ian Rankin
- The Wolf Man, a 1977 novelization of the 1941 film by Ramsey Campbell
- Wolfman, a Kinnikuman character
- Wolfman, a character from the video game Darkwood

== People ==
- Bernard Wolfman (1924–2011), American law professor
- Marv Wolfman (born 1946), American comic book writer
- Wolfman Jack (Robert Weston Smith, 1938–1995), American disc jockey
- Peter Wolfe (musician) (born 1968), nickname Wolfman, English musician
- David Williams (rugby league, born 1986), nickname Wolfman, Australian rugby league player
- The Wolfman (wrestler) (Vilmos Farkas, 1935–2016), Hungarian/Canadian professional wrestler
- Alex Story (singer) (born 1974), nickname Wolfman, American singer
- Wolf Man, pseudonym of Sigmund Freud's patient Sergei Pankejeff

== See also ==
- The Astounding Wolf-Man, a superhero comic book series published by Image Comics
- Man-Wolf, a Marvel Comics character
- Wolf Girl (disambiguation)
- Werewolf (disambiguation)
