= Hidden City Entertainment =

Game publishing company

Hidden City Entertainment was a game publisher founded in 2004 (as Hidden City Games, Inc.) by Jesper Myrfors and Paul Peterson to develop and market the chip-throwing game, "Clout Fantasy." After Clout was developed the company recruited Peter Adkison as CEO.

In June 2006, Hidden City Games signed a five-year agreement with Danish game publisher Conceptcard to market the card game Bella Sara outside Conceptcard's Scandinavian market. In November 2006, Hidden City Entertainment secured $15 million in venture funding from Rustic Canyon Partners and Trinity Ventures, intended to significantly grow the online portion of the business.

In April 2007, Hidden City discontinued development of Clout Fantasy to focus on marketing Bella Sara. In June 2011, after its five-year contract to market Bella Sara ended, Hidden City games shut down.

== Products ==
- Clout Fantasy (released Fall 2005)
  - Defenders of the Undersea (Spring 2006)
  - Redbeard's Revenge (Summer 2006)
- Bella Sara (a horse themed entertainment property for girls)
  - First Edition - 85 horse cards, 12 energy cards and 27 extra-rare shiny cards with silver background
  - Second Series - 97 horse cards and 27 extra-rare shiny cards with gold background
  - Northern Lights - 45 horse cards, 10 extra-rare shiny cards and 17 extra-rare shiny cards with pale blue background
  - Ancient Lights - 45 horse cards, 10 energy cards and 17 extra-rare shiny cards with pink background
  - Native Lights - 45 horse cards, 10 energy cards, and 17 extra-rare shiny cards with textured lavender background.
  - Magical Friends - 74 regular horse cards (each with a unique magical friend), 12 energy cards, and 34 extra-rare shiny cards with solid lavender background
  - Baby Bella - 80 horse cards with 22 parent cards, 48 foal cards and 10 teacher cards, 12 energy cards and 37 extra-rare shiny cards, green background
  - Treasures - 50 horse cards, 5 treasure cards, and 55 extra-rare shiny cards with turquoise background. Each pack comes with a sticker card, a tattoo card, and a mini-game.
  - Royalty - 49 horse cards, 1 Sara card, 5 castle cards, and 55 extra-rare shiny cards with yellow background. Each pack comes with a sticker card, a tattoo card, and a Bella Sara Ticket.
  - Bella's Ball - 50 horse cards, 5 character cards, 5 ballroom cards, and 55 extra-rare shiny cards with orchid background. Each pack comes with a secret code and a sticker card.
  - Sunflowers - 45 horse and/or character cards, 10 character cards, and 55 extra-rare shiny cards. Each pack comes with a secret code and a sticker card.
  - Miniatures Series 1, 2, and 3 - Velvety horses now in the palm of your hand.
  - Collectors Tins - Including school tin, holiday 2008 tins, holiday 2009 tins, and a brand-new horse keepsake case this April 2010.

== Sources ==
- "Announcement of license to produce Bella Sara" Hidden City website
- "Announcement of Marvel License signing" Hidden City website
- Chiu, Lisa (May 6, 2006). ""Wizards" conjuring up old magic: making games". The Seattle Times. Archived from the original on September 29, 2007.
- Hidden City website
- "Hidden City Games Closes $15 Million Round from Rustic Canyon Partners and Trinity Ventures" Hidden City website
- "With Ponies, Unicorns and Secret Codes, an Effort to Unleash a Craze for Girls" New York Times Business Section November 12, 2006
- "Wrapping Up Clout" April 17, 2007
- "Hidden City Games Closes Up" Game Salute News July 12, 2011
