= Rage (collectible card game) =

Collectible card game

- Cardback of the Rage CCG
- Designers: Mike Tinney, Stephan Wieck
- Publishers: White Wolf, FRPG
- Players: 2+
- Setup time: Build a deck= 20-40 minutes. Actual physical setup, less than 2 minutes.
- Playing time: 30 minutes for 2 player. Add roughly 15 minutes to time for each additional player.
- Chance: Low. Some deck types are more affected by random draws than others.
- Skills: Card playing

Rage is an out-of-print collectible card game originally published by White Wolf in May 1995 based on the role-playing game Werewolf: The Apocalypse. The game is based around packs of werewolves battling each other and various evil monsters while trying to save the world.

== Product information ==
=== White Wolf ===
Rage had five sets of cards:

- Limited/Unlimited
- Umbra
- Wyrm
- War of the Amazon
- Legacy of the Tribes

The game was discontinued by White Wolf after Legacy of the Tribes. Three months later, Five Rings Publishing Group (FRPG) obtained a license from White Wolf to publish a new version.

The initial release consisted of over 300 cards sold in 60-card starter decks and 12-card booster packs.

The first expansion set was called Umbra, with its 90 cards sold in 12-card booster packs.

=== Five Rings ===
Freelance game designer Luke Peterschmidt, who had previously been lead designer at FRPG, was contracted to design a new version of the game for FRPG. It had the same card backs and set in the same world, but with completely different mechanics making it incompatible with the first version of the game. The second version of the game had seven card sets.

The first six sets, which were numbered and released monthly, were Get of Fenris, Wendigo, Bone Gnawers, Red Talon, Silent Striders, and Shadow Lords. They were known as Phase 1 through 6. Each 80-card set was sold in 60-card starter decks and 15-card booster packs. The final set, Equinox, combined three of the smaller numbered sets (7-9) into one larger set.

=== Various producers ===
FRPG was bought out by Wizards of the Coast (the makers of Magic: The Gathering), who were in turn bought out by Hasbro. Hasbro discontinued many of the games it had acquired in the take over, including Rage. The license for the game lapsed back to White Wolf.

Azrael Productions, who produced an online magazine, acquired permission from White Wolf to provide tournament support for both versions of Rage. However, Azrael was unable to acquire the license to bring Rage back into print. While under Azrael's care, there were two notable developments. The first version of Rage came to be called "Rage: Apocalypse" and the second version "Rage: Tribal War" so people would not be confused as to which version people were talking about.

Azrael Productions also assembled a group of dedicated fans to start designing new cards for the game. They started playtesting these cards before Azrael eventually abandoned the project. Azrael gave up rights to the partially tested cards, leaving the path clear for the playtesters to produce fan-made sets of cards.

The first set of these fan made cards, Intermezzo, was released in 2003. A total of five fan made sets for Rage: Apocalypse (Intermezzo, Periphery, Gauntlet, and Coda. They are collectively known as the New England Block. War Council is the fifth set and starts the Ahadi block.) and two for Tribal War (Web of Deceit and Christmas Present '04) have been released since then. The cards are hosted on the official Rage site, Entrail Rend, but are considered legitimate by White Wolf and are allowed in regular tournaments and for use in online play. They are not hosted on the main White Wolf server due to copyright issues with the artwork.

== Online play ==
Rage was available for online play for several years via the gatlingEngine, produced by CCG Workshop. They had a licensing agreement with White Wolf allowing them to develop online versions of White Wolf's CCG properties (Rage, Vampire: the Eternal Struggle, and Arcadia: the Wyld Hunt). That platform is now defunct.

Due to complex legal issues, only Rage: Apocalypse is available for online play. Hasbro retains some partial rights to Rage: Tribal War and was unwilling to license it to CCG Workshop.

While Rage is currently out of print, it can be played online using a program called LackeyCCG. Instructions on how to get started are at the Rage website. It runs on both PC and Mac and includes all printed cards, all fan sets and sets in playtesting.

== Changes since online play began ==
A major rules overhaul for Rage's rules was released in March 2006. The update clarified many card interactions and converted rulings about individual cards to global rulings. There was an additional update (Rage's Least Wanted) that introduced erratas for the 18 most broken cards in the game and introduced new rules for Past Lives that returned them to play.

November 2006 saw the release of the first set in the Ahadi block, War Council. This set introduced updates to the frenzy rules, Moot and Board Meeting rules, changed when the first combat hand was drawn, and allowed some Prey and Allies access to additional Gifts. War Council also introduced a new Wyrm faction to the game, the Unbound, and made the 7th Generation part of a larger faction, Cults. Additional Gaia and Wyrm factions will be introduced throughout the Ahadi block.

September 2007 has a flurry of Rage activity. Rainmakers, the second set in the Ahadi block, was released. It introduced the new Ajaba (werehyena) faction, fleshed out the Pentex Executives and Mokole, and introduced the first of the new Rogue characters. The new Revised rules were introduced. These were largely a reorganization of the old rules book, but also introduced a new timing system. The long overdue rewrite to the rules for Battlefields was also released for Beta testing.

Hellcats (2011) introduced the Simba (werelions) and Bagheera (wereleopards) to Rage, as well as the eponymous Hellcats. This mixture of corrupted Caelican and fallen Simba was only briefly mentioned in Apocalypse and Rage expanded significantly on the source material. Curse of Set (2012) introduced a new subfaction of Cults, the vampiric Walid Set.

Call of the Sea is a four set block released in 2013 and 2014 with a semi-constructed deck format. It was also intended as a new introductory set for new or returning players which would make it easier to learn the game. Three faction decks and one combat set were released for use in either regular or sealed deck format. Chulorviah introduced a new Cults faction featuring mind controlling squid beasts. (Chulorviah originally appeared in World of Darkness: Blood Dimmed Tides source book). Rokea expanded the shark shapeshifters to a full playable faction. Sea Dogs was a split deck with one captain each for Gaia and WYrm with most of the rest of the characters being Rogues, so would be either Gaia or Wyrm characters depending on which captain you selected for your ship. The combat set works with any of the three decks, but had six cards for each deck that were specially marked as working best with that faction.

2014 also saw rerelease of Least Wanted with a second update to account for additional rules updates and the new sets that had been released in the previous 8 years.

2015 the 20th anniversary rules update was released along and a major overhaul of errata for previous sets was started. Conclave block entered playtesting and the first set of the Conclave block was released at the end of the year. Rise of Kupala expanded the Cults faction to include infernalists. A fan vote was held at end of the year to determine new members of the Silver Pack for the Conclave block.

The New England block was revised and remastered in higher quality in 2016. Updated errata was released for most sets. An update to how political actions (Moots & Board Meetings) was playtested along with the rest of Conclave block, which dealt heavily with political actions. An updated rules set for Battlefields was released.

To War! the second set in the Conclave block was released in 2017. War Council was updated to a higher resolution. The updated rules for Moots were officially released.

Sets/rules changes currently in production, as of Nov. 2017:

- Something Old, Something New (Tribal War)- Abandoned due to legal issues.
- Conclave (Apocalypse) - A four part block focusing on a grand moot- open beta for remaining two sets
- Beast Courts (Apocalypse)- This is a block with multiple sets. It deals with the Far East. Initial design phase

== Game sets and expansions ==
Apocalypse

- Rage Limited (1995)
- Rage Unlimited (1995)
- The Umbra (1995)
- The Wyrm (1995)
- The War of the Amazon (1996)
- Legacy of the Tribes (1996)
- Intermezzo (fan set- New England block 2003)
- Periphery (fan set- New England block 2004)
- Gauntlet (fan set- New England block 2004)
- Coda (fan set- New England block 2005)
- Rage's Least Wanted (virtual reprint/2nd edition- reprints of the 18 most broken cards with total redone wording to fix all mechanical problems- 2006)
- War Council (fan set- Ahadi block 2006)
- Rainmakers(fan set- Ahadi block 2007)
- Rainfall (fan set- Ahadi block 2008)
- Sahel (fan set- Ahadi block 2009)
- Hellcats (fan set- Ahadi block 2011)
- Ambush at the Apophis Pipeline (fan set- Ahadi block 2012)
- Curse of Set (fan set- Ahadi block 2012)
- Call of the Sea- combat set (fan set 2013)
- Chulorviah deck (fan set Call of the Sea block 2013)
- Rokea deck (fan set Call of the Sea block 2013)
- Sea Dogs deck (fan set Call of the Sea block 2014)
- Rise of Kupala (fan set Conclave block 2015)
- To War! (fan set Conclave block 2017)

Tribal War

- Rage across Las Vegas: Phase 1 (1998)
- Rage across Las Vegas: Phase 2 (1998)
- Rage across Las Vegas: Phase 3 (1998)
- Rage across Las Vegas: Phase 4 (1998)
- Rage across Las Vegas: Phase 5 (1998)
- Rage across Las Vegas: Phase 6 (1998)
- Rage across Las Vegas: Equinox (1999)
- Web of Deceit (fan set 2004)
- Christmas Present (fan set 2004)

=== Rage Limited ===
Rage Limited was a limited edition print run of the base set for the Rage CCG. It contained 321 cards total, in common, uncommon, rare, and "chase" rarities. The chase cards were available only in the Booster boxes. All other cards were available both as boosters as starters.

Limited edition can be distinguished from Unlimited edition by the silver holograms in the lower right corner. A few cards changed artwork between Limited and unlimited. Some cards also changed text slightly, but most of these changes were relatively small. A few cards changed card types.

Limited edition, despite the name, can still be easily found on eBay for prices below its original street value.

== List of card artists ==
Apocalypse

- Barbara Armata
- Ash Arnett
- Andrew Bates
- Stuart P. Beel
- John Bridges
- Dennis Calero
- Hank Carlson
- Mike Carter
- Steve Carter aka 'SCAR'
- Richard Case
- Mike Chaney
- Mark Chiarello
- John Cobb
- Michael Scott Cohen
- James Daly
- Mike Danza
- Tony DiTerlizzi
- Erin Dixon
- Robert "Shaggy" Dixon
- Mike Dringenburg
- Brian "Chippy" Dugan
- Jason Felix
- Richard Kane Ferguson
- Lee Fields
- Scott Fischer
- Doug Alexander Gregory
- Dærick Gröss Sr.
- Rebecca Guay
- Matt Haley
- Scott Hampton
- Tony Harris
- Jeff Holt
- Quinton Hoover
- Brian Horton
- Mark Jackson
- Andrew Mitchell Kudelka
- Clint Langley
- Brian LeBlanc
- Paul Lee
- Larry MacDougall
- Robert MacNeill
- Anson Maddocks
- John Matson
- Katie McCaskill
- Chris McDonough
- Ken Meyer Jr.
- Mike Mignola
- Matt Milberger
- Aileen E. Miles
- Jeff Miracola
- Christopher Moeller
- Kevin Murphy
- Jesper Myrfors
- Ted Naifeh
- William O'Connor
- John E. Park
- Shea Anton Pensa
- Omaha Perez
- Alan Pollack
- Michelle Prahler
- Steve Prescott
- Jeff Rebner
- Adam Rex
- Kathleen Ryan
- Antoinette Rydyr aka 'SCAR'
- John K. Schneider
- Alex Sheikman
- Tom Simmons
- E. Allen Smith
- Roger Smith
- Lawrence Snelly
- John K. Snyder III
- Ron Spencer
- Ron States
- James Stowe aka 'Sto'
- Richard Thomas
- Joshua Gabriel Timbrook
- Jamie Tolagson
- Drew Tucker
- John Van Fleet
- Jos Weymer
- Lawrence Allen Williams

Tribal War

- Shino Arihara
- Barbara Armata
- Andrew Bates
- Thomas Baxa
- Stuart P. Beel
- Blake Beasley
- Theodor Black
- Aaron Boyd
- John Bridges
- Ron Brown
- Dennis Calero
- Steve Carter aka 'SCAR'
- Steve Casper
- Mike Chaney
- Richard Clark
- John Cobb
- Joe Corroney
- James Daly
- Michael Danza
- Tony DiTerlizzi
- Jason Edmiston
- Veme Edwards
- Vincent Evans
- Jason Felix
- Richard Kane Ferguson
- Lee Fields
- Scott Fischer
- Jon Foster
- Tom Fowler
- Darren Fryendall
- Michael Gaydos
- Daniel Gelon
- Dærick Gröss Sr.
- Pia Guerra
- Matt Haley
- Fred Harper
- Henry Higgenbotham
- Anthony Highwater
- Anthony Hightower
- James Holt
- Jeff Holt
- Quinton Hoover
- Brian Horton
- Horley
- Sam Hubbell
- Jeremy Jarvis
- Kirby Kiser
- Patrick Kochakji
- Clint Langley
- Brian LeBlanc
- Larry MacDonugall
- Corey Macourek
- Craig Maher
- John Matson
- Katie McCaskill
- R. Dean McCreary
- Chris McDonough
- Paul Mendoza
- Alfredo Mercado
- Matt Milberger
- Aileen Miles
- Ian Miller
- Jeff Miracola
- William O'Connor
- Shea Anton Pensa
- Omaha Perez
- Steve Prescott
- Jeff Rebner
- Andrew Ritchie
- Matt Roach
- Antoinette Rydyr aka 'SCAR'
- Alex Sheikman
- Tom Simmons
- Lawrence Snelly
- Ron Spencer
- Ron States
- James Stowe aka 'Sto'
- Richard Thomas
- Joshua Gabriel Timbrook
- Drew Tucker
- Anthony Waters
- Conan Venus
- Brain Wackwitz
- Lawrence Allen Williams

Fansets

- Andrea L. Adams
- Timothy Albee
- Kelly Bedson
- Ruth "Brushfire" Blais
- Matther Bradbury
- Simon D. Brewer
- Victoria Champion
- Denise Chan
- Christine "Mayshing" Chong
- Frances Cofill
- Tallulah Cunningham
- Cypherwolf
- Tallison D. Daemontruse
- Ferdz Decena
- Darby Dozier
- Alex Eckman-Lawn
- Eric Euler
- Juaina Ahmad Faszil
- Meghan Farrell
- Fabin Fernandez
- Feros
- Shelby Fetterman (Harliban)
- Josh Fontenot aka 'Maglot'
- Eric Garcia
- Roz Gibson
- Joshua Eli Gilley
- Ed Harris
- Christiee Hochstine
- Katie Hofgard
- Odis Holcomb aka 'Ryngs Rakune'
- Horationhellpop
- R. Hrynkiewicz
- Sam Hudson
- Markku Immonen
- David "Mutley" James
- Nathalie Jean-Bart
- Jidane
- Amanda "Hyena" Johnson
- Wes Jones
- Brienne "Ayanna" Jones
- Daria Kamiñska
- I.C. Kessler
- Caroline Kinsella
- Maja Krzyzanowska
- Mikko Lahti
- Lissanne Lake
- Emma Lazauski
- J.C. - KaTing Lang
- Andreas Larsson
- Therese Larsson
- Renee LeCompte
- Kimberly LeCrone
- Reagan Lodge
- Jordan Lorenz
- Stina Lovkvist aka 'Spocha'
- Katelyn Malmsten
- Ira Martin
- Mel Matthews
- Patrick McEvoy
- Jérome Merriaux
- Sarah Mezger
- Minstrar
- Cara Mitten
- Mutedfaith
- Dark Natasha
- R. Noke
- Northwolf
- Melissa O'Brien
- Lee O'Connor
- H. C. O'Neill aka 'Fenris Lorsrai'
- Wakka Ookami
- Cathey Osborne
- Star
- Otto Pessanha
- Yvonne M. Poslon
- Pseudomanitou
- Amy L. Rawson
- Gilda Rimessi
- Chella Reaves
- Allison Reed
- Revontulet
- Sitthideth
- Stephen Sloan
- Amber Smith-Cochrane
- Jess Stoncius
- Swiftrat
- Trevor Tang
- Kim Taylor
- Allison Theus
- Trantsiss
- Twisha
- Matthew Vega
- Traci Vermeesch
- Ursula Vernon
- Courtney "Hellcorpceo" Via
- Victory
- Jeff Waltersdorf
- Florence Wong
- Dani "Zippermouth" Zim
- Beth Zyglowicz

== Reception ==
Jimmie W. Pursell reviewed Rage for Pyramid magazine and stated that "Rage is a fast-paced, high production value, collectible card game. The cards themselves are, in my opinion, the best on the market. The game plays fast and furious with a premium on combat. The variable playtime and increased player control make for a refreshing diversion when you're tired of Vampire marathons. On the whole, I highly recommend Rage, especially to those interested in the White Wolf line."

Andy Butcher reviewed The War of the Amazon expansion set for Rage for Arcane magazine, rating it an 8 out of 10 overall. Butcher comments that "The War Of The Amazon is another excellent expansion that offers a great deal for any dedicated player."

Andy Butcher reviewed Legacy of the Tribes for Arcane magazine, rating it an 8 out of 10 overall, and stated that "In short, then, another excellent expansion for one of the better CCGs around. Rage has never seemed to be a massive hit, which is a shame, because it's been one of the most consistently high quality games around, and is ideally suited to multiplayer games. In fact, this is its only real problem - it's a much better game with three or four players than with only two."

== Reviews ==
- Rollespilsmagasinet Fønix (Danish) (Issue 9 - August/September 1995)
- Legacy of the Tribes expansion set in The Duelist #15 (February 1997)
- Backstab #14 (Rage across Las Vegas: Phase 5 and 6)
- Backstab #15 (Rage across Las Vegas: Phase 7, 8, 9)
