= Werewolf: The Apocalypse =

Tabletop role-playing game

- Revised Edition cover
- Designers: Mark Rein·Hagen
- Publishers: White Wolf (1992–2004); Onyx Path Publishing (2012–)
- Publication: 1992 (ed. 1); 1994 (ed. 2); 2000 (Revised Edition); 2013 (20th Anniversary Edition); 2023 (5th Edition)
- Genres: Savage horror
- Systems: Storyteller System

Werewolf: The Apocalypse is a role-playing game of the Classic World of Darkness game series by White Wolf Publishing. Other related products include the collectible card games named Rage and several novels (including one series). In the game, players take the role of werewolves known as "Garou". These werewolves are locked in a two-front war against both the spiritual desolation of urban civilization and supernatural forces of corruption that seek to bring the Apocalypse. Game supplements detail the other therianthropic shape-shifters, known as the "Fera" or "Changing Breeds".

Along with the other titles in the World of Darkness, Werewolf was discontinued in 2004. Its successor title within the Chronicles of Darkness line, Werewolf: The Forsaken was released on March 14, 2005.

The books have been reprinted since 2011 as part of the "Classic World of Darkness" line. A series of 48-page comic books was published quarterly beginning in November 2001 by Moonstone Books.

== Premise ==
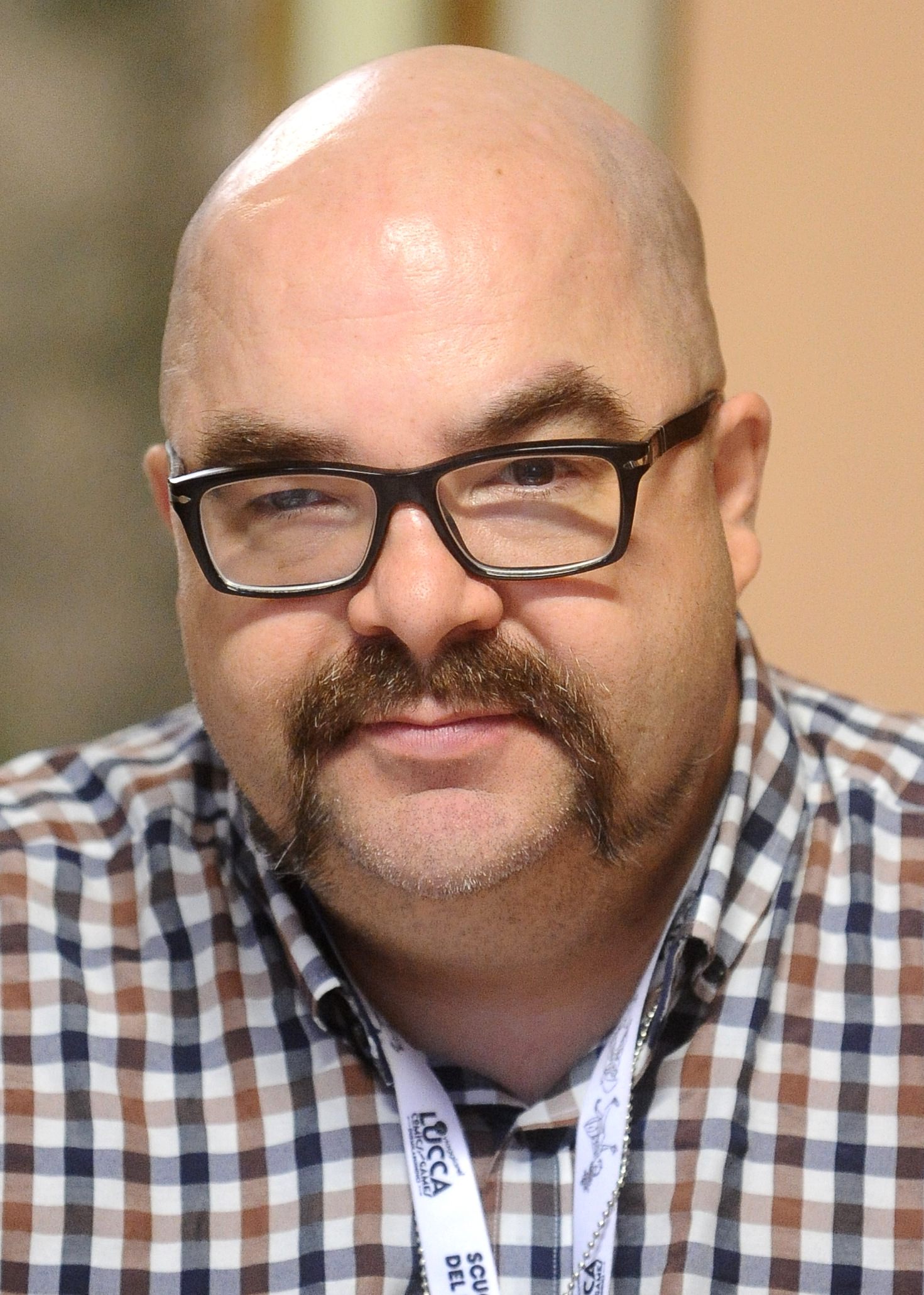
Mark Rein-Hagen designed Werewolf: The Apocalypse.

The basic premise of the game is that the player characters are Garou, or werewolves, who have undergone some training and succeeded in a rite of passage. After this, they advance in rank by working together to gain fame.

The five main forms of the Garou are: Homid (human), Glabro (wolfman), Crinos (war-form), Hispo (near-wolf) and Lupus (wolf).

The game takes place in a fictional world where werewolves, vampires, and other legendary creatures secretly live beside humans. This setting is a dark reflection of the real world filled with corruption, apathy, violence, and hopelessness. The setting is also described as "Gothic-Punk."

The Garou battle to maintain this world before all the negativity leads to a total collapse, the titular "apocalypse". They hide it from the public eye and live in secret from humanity in general. In their war, the Garou often hunt down and kill humans and supernatural creatures that either actively pursue the apocalypse or unwittingly contribute to it, due to their parasitic nature. This includes fallen Garou, vampires, evil spirits, mages, and humans (and other creatures) possessed by demons. In doing so, the Garou regard themselves as the immune system of the planet.

Other themes of the game include the inability of the Garou to live as humans, although they were born in human form due to "the curse"; and interaction with spirits that are separated from the physical world in a realm that the Garou can enter. This is part of an ornate game mythology.

== Player character creation ==
Players are given the opportunity to create Garou, the werewolves of the setting, or their allies or rivals. Lycanthropy in the World of Darkness setting is an inherited trait, and thus players are born with their abilities. However, these abilities only manifest in what is called the “first change”: an event, generally occurring during puberty, that causes the character's latent powers to surface. Players are given the opportunity to have their character inherently know that the Garou exist, or be an effective “orphan” from Garou society, necessitating discovery by others. It is after this point that they join that society and cut off their ties to their previous worlds, except to make sure their blood relatives remain safe.

There are three archetypes that the player can use that define how their character was born, referred to as a "breed" in the games. A Garou's parents are generally one Garou and a non-Garou human or wolf with strong Garou heritage, referred to as kinfolk. Garou with human parentage are called "homid", and Garou of wolf parentage are "lupus", that gain intelligence and the ability to turn into humans. There is also the option to play as a "metis", a Garou born from the union of two Garou parents; metis are born already transformed, have horns, and are infertile and deformed, and can result in the death of the mother. Such unions are forbidden in Garou society. Each breed has its own benefits and disadvantages. In addition to these variables, players select the lunar phase under which the character was born (the “auspice”) and the tribe to which the character belongs. Each of these contributes to the advantages the character may enjoy. More advanced rules include references to other “changing breeds” in this world.

== Publication history ==
The first title in the series, Werewolf: The Apocalypse, was published by White Wolf Publishing in 1991. The game was the second to integrate the fictional universe in a game system (the Storyteller System) which had been introduced in the Vampire: The Masquerade line, released earlier in the year. The Second Edition of the game line came out in 1994, followed by a Revised Edition in 2000. In 2012 a 20th Anniversary Edition was released through Onyx Path Publishing.

Starting in 2011, as part of the "Classic World of Darkness" series, Werewolf: The Apocalypse books have been sold digitally through DriveThruRPG. DriveThru has also made some older books available as print on demand. New titles in the series have also been released, such as the Werewolf Translation Guide in April 2012.

Werewolf: The Apocalypse is among the White Wolf properties licensed to be developed by Onyx Path Publishing.

In January of 2017, Paradox Interactive AB announced a video game adaptation of the franchise with Focus Home Interactive, under the title Werewolf: The Apocalypse – The Official Video Game. The release title would become Werewolf: The Apocalypse – Earthblood around June 2019.

A fifth edition of the game was released in August 2023. It is planned to be supported by the online toolset World of Darkness Nexus, which includes rules and lore compendium, tools for creating and managing characters, matchmaking, and video chat functionality.

== Reception ==
Mike Nystul reviewed Werewolf: The Apocalypse in White Wolf #33 (Sept./Oct., 1992), rating it a 4 out of 5 and stated that "I highly recommend Werewolf, especially to gamers who bought Vampire and never got around to playing it."

Rick Swan reviewed the game twice in the magazine pages of Dragon.

- In the April 1993 edition (Issue 192), Swan was not impressed by the editing: "Much of the book is haphazardly organized; the section on storytelling precedes the chapter on character creation, breed types are introduced in Chapter Two but not detailed until Chapter Six, and I had to search three chapters to round up all the pertinent material about Renown. Skills lack adequate descriptions; specialties are barely described at all.” However, he still gave the game a thumbs up, saying, "With its emphasis on storytelling over mechanics, Werewolf gets closer to the heart of what role-playing's supposedly all about than any new game I've seen in a long time."
- However, 18 months later, in the October 1994 edition (Issue 210), Swan had revised his opinion after a long play-test. He said "I couldn't keep track of the complicated mythology (What the heck is the Impergium?), my players weren't sure how their characters were supposed to behave (What is it you do with totems again?), and none of us were able to keep the tribes straight (Are the Shadow Lords trying to overthrow the Silver Fangs, or vice versa?). The Werewolf game was great, to be sure. But it made us feel stupid. So we gave up." Swan did give a thumbs up to the recently published Werewolf Player's Guide, which he called "a handy—make that indispensable—tome that clarifies the game's murkier concepts."

Dustin Wright reviewed 2nd Edition for Pyramid #10 (November 1994) and stated that "Overall, Werewolf: The Apocalypse 2nd Edition is much better than the first book. Bill Bridges and the pack are to be congratulated for putting out an outstanding product; I heartily recommend it to those out there already playing the first edition. For those of you who have not tried playing Werewolf yet, I suggest picking this game up and giving it a try. Go rage!"

=== Awards ===
- In 1995, Werewolf: The Apocalypse was nominated for Casus Belli's award for the best role-playing game of 1994, and ended up in second place after Chimères.
- In a 1996 reader's poll conducted by Arcane magazine to determine the 50 most popular roleplaying games of all time, Werewolf: The Apocalypse was ranked 33rd. Editor Paul Pettengale commented: "Being the second game in the Storyteller series - which includes Vampire, Mage, Wraith and Changeling - Werewolf shares the same system and setting, the World of Darkness. It contains lots of background for the Garou, and their struggle to fight the forces of the Wyrm. It can be fast, vicious, or tragic and thought-provoking."

== Reviews ==
- Backstab #26
- Backstab #34 (as "Loup-garou: l'Apocalypse") (3e edition)
- Casus Belli #72 (Nov 1992)
- Coleção Dragão Brasil
- Dosdediez (Número 8 - Jul 1996)
- Pyramid - Revised Edition
- Rollespilsmagasinet Fønix (Danish) (Issue 3 - July/August 1994)
- Świat Gier Komputerowych #53
- Valkyrie #1 (Sept., 1994)

== Tie-ins/adaptations/pop culture ==
- In 1995, White Wolf Publishing released Rage, a collectible card game based on the Werewolf property.
- In October of 1996, Slipknot released a demo album entitled Mate.Feed.Kill.Repeat. Many of the lyrics and the album's title are inspired by the role-playing game.
- A PC adventure game named Werewolf: The Apocalypse – Heart of Gaia were developed by DreamForge Intertainment and ASC Games but the companies went bankrupt before it finished.
- A PlayStation/Sega Saturn game by Capcom titled Werewolf: The Apocalypse was announced but cancelled in early 1997.
- Werewolf: The Apocalypse – Heart of the Forest, a visual novel role-playing video game developed by Different Tales, was released on October 13, 2020.
- Werewolf: The Apocalypse – Earthblood, an action role-playing video game, was developed by Cyanide and released on February 4, 2021, for Microsoft Windows, PlayStation 4, PlayStation 5, Xbox One and Xbox Series X.
