= List of Wraith: The Oblivion books =

Game books for Wraith: The Oblivion

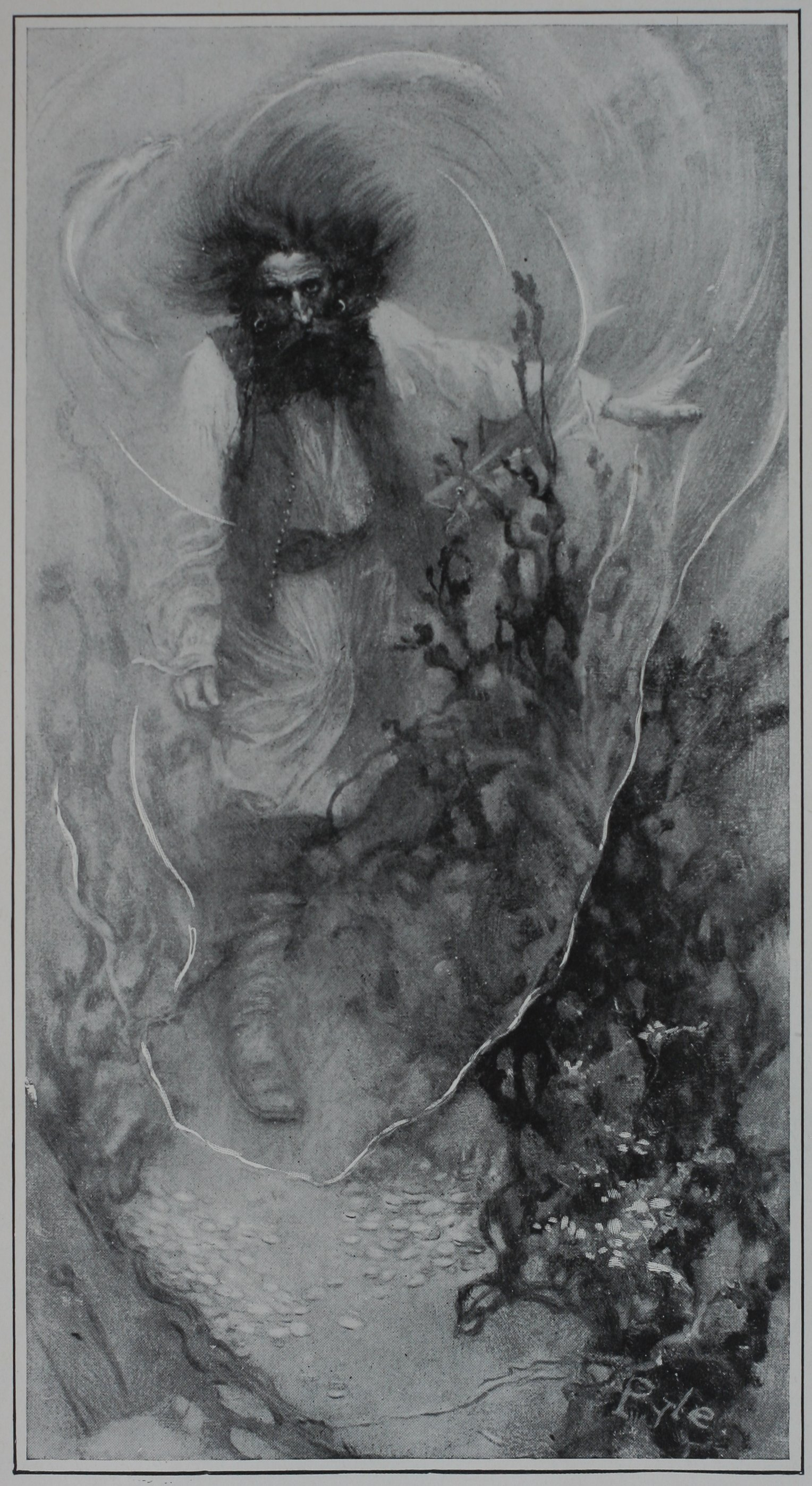
A 1902 illustration of a pirate ghost, by Howard Pyle. In Wraith: The Oblivion, players take the roles of wraiths.

Wraith: The Oblivion is the fourth game in the World of Darkness series of horror tabletop role-playing games. They share the same setting – a dark, gothic-punk interpretation of the real world, rife with corruption, where supernatural beings exist. These are featured as the playable characters; in the case of Wraith: The Oblivion, players take the roles of wraiths in the afterlife.

The game was first released by White Wolf Publishing in 1994, and was published in new editions in 1996 (second edition) and 2018 (20th Anniversary Edition), which updated the game rules. These have been supported with supplementary game books, expanding the game mechanics and setting. The books from the game's original run were published by White Wolf Publishing, sometimes under their imprint Black Dog Game Factory for books considered more adult. Supplements for the 20th Anniversary Edition were published by Onyx Path Publishing, a company formed by ex–White Wolf Publishing staff.

The supplements include the Guildbook series, describing wraith guilds; sourcebooks about character types; books describing locations as they are portrayed in the setting; game guides; and various other books. The line was critically well received for its mood and consistency, but still underperformed commercially during its original run, which led to its cancellation in 1998; the adventure module Ends of Empire was published a year later to give the game an ending. On the other hand, the 20th Anniversary Edition was successful, overperforming at Onyx Path Publishing's crowdfunding campaign for its production.

== Books ==
=== First edition (1994–1996) ===
Game books for Wraith: The Oblivion's first edition
Title	Original release	ISBN	Publisher	Notes
Wraith: The Oblivion	August 18, 1994	1-56504-133-X	White Wolf Publishing	Core rulebook for the game's first edition. Went under the working title Ghost.
Wraith Character Kit	September 1994	1-56504-132-1	White Wolf Publishing	Booklet about character creation and archaic firearms. Bundled with small storyteller (Note: The person leading the game is called the "storyteller" in World of Darkness games, a role called "gamemaster" or "dungeon master" in other role-playing games.) screen.
Haunts	December 1994	1-56504-610-2	White Wolf Publishing	Sourcebook for haunted locations where wraiths seek shelter
Midnight Express	1994	1-56504-156-9	White Wolf Publishing	Sourcebook for the Midnight Train, and a collection of six adventures
Necropolis: Atlanta	1994	1-56504-164-X	White Wolf Publishing	Sourcebook for the land of the dead in Atlanta. Crossover with Vampire: The Masquerade.
Wraith Storytellers Kit	1994	1-56504-168-2	White Wolf Publishing	Booklet about character creation and crossover play with other World of Darkness games. Bundled with storyteller screen.
Love Beyond Death	February 1995	1-56504-611-0	White Wolf Publishing	Sourcebook for romance, and a collection of adventures
The Sea of Shadows	April–May 1995	1-56504-612-9	White Wolf Publishing	Sourcebook for the Tempest, the ocean of the land of the dead
The Quick & the Dead	July 1995	1-56504-613-7	White Wolf Publishing	Sourcebook for ghost hunters
The Hierarchy	August 1995	1-56504-614-5	White Wolf Publishing	Sourcebook for the bureaucracy of the land of the dead
Dark Reflections: Spectres	November 1995	1-56504-650-1	White Wolf Publishing	Sourcebook for malevolent entities. Published under the Black Dog Game Factory imprint.
Dark Kingdom of Jade	1995	1-56504-615-3	White Wolf Publishing	Sourcebook for the land of the dead in Asia, with a focus on China
Wraith Players Guide	1995	1-56504-601-3	White Wolf Publishing	Guide to the game for players
Guildbook: Artificers	January 1996	1-56504-661-7	White Wolf Publishing	Sourcebook for the Artificers guild
Dark Kingdom of Jade Adventures	March 1996	1-56504-617-X	White Wolf Publishing	Sourcebook for locations in Asia, and a collection of adventures
Guildbook: Sandmen	March 1996	1-56504-662-5	White Wolf Publishing	Sourcebook for the Sandmen guild
The Risen	June 1996	1-56504-663-3	White Wolf Publishing	Sourcebook for dead spirits who have returned to their bodies

=== Second edition (1996–1999) ===
Game books for Wraith: The Oblivion's second edition
Title	Original release	ISBN	Publisher	Notes
Wraith: The Oblivion	August 8, 1996	1-56504-600-5	White Wolf Publishing	Core rulebook for the game's second edition
Guildbook: Masquers	September–December 1996	1-56504-604-8	White Wolf Publishing	Sourcebook for the Masquers guild
Buried Secrets	1996	1-56504-603-X	White Wolf Publishing	Companion to the core rulebook, including playing advice and an adventure set in Atlanta
Shadow Players Guide	January–March 1997	1-56504-602-1	White Wolf Publishing	Guide for playing as Shadows
Charnel Houses of Europe: The Shoah	March–April 1997	1-56504-651-X	White Wolf Publishing	Sourcebook for World War II. Published under the Black Dog Game Factory imprint.
Guildbook: Haunters	April–May 1997	1-56504-604-8	White Wolf Publishing	Sourcebook for the Haunters guild
Mediums: Speakers with the Dead	September–October 1997	1-56504-619-6	White Wolf Publishing	Sourcebook for spirit mediums
Guildbook: Pardoners and Puppeteers	October–November 1997	1-56504-665-X	White Wolf Publishing	Sourcebook for the Pardoners and Puppeteers guilds
The Book of Legions	December 1997	1-56504-652-8	White Wolf Publishing	Sourcebook for the Hierarchy's legions
Guildbook: Spooks and Oracles	February 1998	1-56504-666-8	White Wolf Publishing	Sourcebook for the Spooks and Oracles guilds
Ghost Towns	April 1998	1-56504-343-X	White Wolf Publishing	Sourcebook for ghost towns. Crossover with Werewolf: The Wild West.
Doomslayers: Into the Labyrinth	June 1998	1-56504-635-8	White Wolf Publishing	Sourcebook for wraiths who hunt spectres and other malevolent entities
Renegades	August–October 1998	1-56504-636-6	White Wolf Publishing	Sourcebook for wraith revolutionaries
Ends of Empire	August–October 1999	1-56504-618-8	White Wolf Publishing	Adventure about the Sixth Great Maelstrom engulfing the Underworld, and an ending to Wraith: The Oblivion

=== 20th Anniversary Edition (2018–2019) ===
Game books for Wraith: The Oblivion 20th Anniversary Edition
Title	Original release	ISBN	Publisher	Notes
Handbook for the Recently Deceased	July 11, 2018	—	Onyx Path Publishing	Booklet introducing new players and storytellers to the game and setting
Wraith: The Oblivion 20th Anniversary Edition	August 8, 2018	—	Onyx Path Publishing	Core rulebook for the game's 20th Anniversary Edition
The Book of Oblivion	August 14, 2019	—	Onyx Path Publishing	Sourcebook for shadows, spectres, and the game's setting
