= List of World of Darkness video games =

Video games in the World of Darkness series

Series logo

World of Darkness is a series of tabletop role-playing games by White Wolf Publishing, and the name of their shared setting. Several of the tabletop games – primarily Vampire: The Masquerade – have been adapted into video games by different developers, covering genres including role-playing games, action games, and adventure games. Critical reception of the games has varied, (Note: See Metacritic: Vampire: The Masquerade – Redemption, Hunter: The Reckoning – Redeemer, Vampire: The Masquerade – Bloodlines, and Hunter: The Reckoning.) with Vampire: The Masquerade – Bloodlines standing out, being described by video game publications as a cult classic (Note: See USgamer, GamesRadar+, and Polygon.) and a "flawed masterpiece". (Note: See Rock, Paper, Shotgun, PC World, and Escapist Magazine.)

Video game adaptations of the series began in the 1990s with unreleased Werewolf: The Apocalypse and Mage: The Ascension games; the first World of Darkness video game to be released was Vampire: The Masquerade – Redemption in 2000, which was followed by three Hunter: The Reckoning games in 2002–2003, and Bloodlines in 2004. During the next decade, another Werewolf project and the online game World of Darkness were started and canceled, but no further video games in the series were released until 2017's World of Darkness Preludes. Since then, several video games have been developed, based on Werewolf, Wraith: The Oblivion, Hunter, and Vampire, including Bloodlines 2.

== Vampire: The Masquerade ==
Game	Details
Vampire: The Masquerade – Redemption Original release date: June 7, 2000	Release years by system: 2000 – Windows; 2001 – MacOS
Vampire: The Masquerade – Redemption Original release date: June 7, 2000	Notes: Developed by Nihilistic Software; Published by Activision for Windows and by MacSoft for MacOS; Role-playing game
Vampire: The Masquerade – Bloodlines Original release dates: NA: November 16, 2004; EU: November 19, 2004	Release years by system: 2004 – Windows
Vampire: The Masquerade – Bloodlines Original release dates: NA: November 16, 2004; EU: November 19, 2004	Notes: Developed by Troika Games and published by Activision; Action role-playing game; Released in an unfinished state with technical problems, necessitating the use of unofficial, fan-made patches; Described as a cult classic and "flawed masterpiece" by video game publications
Vampire: The Masquerade – Coteries of New York Original release date: December 11, 2019	Release years by system: 2019 – Windows; 2020 – Linux, MacOS, Nintendo Switch, PlayStation 4, Xbox One
Vampire: The Masquerade – Coteries of New York Original release date: December 11, 2019	Notes: Developed and published by Draw Distance; Visual novel; Received the stand-alone expansion Shadows of New York in 2020
Vampire: The Masquerade – Shadows of New York Original release date: September 10, 2020	Release years by system: 2020 – Linux, MacOS, Nintendo Switch, PlayStation 4, Windows, Xbox One
Vampire: The Masquerade – Shadows of New York Original release date: September 10, 2020	Notes: Developed and published by Draw Distance; Visual novel; Stand-alone expansion to Coteries of New York
Vampire: The Masquerade – Night Road Original release date: September 24, 2020	Release years by system: 2020 – Android, iOS, Linux, MacOS, web browsers, Windows
Vampire: The Masquerade – Night Road Original release date: September 24, 2020	Notes: Developed and published by Choice of Games; Interactive fiction game; Received expansions in 2020 and 2021 adding further playable vampire clans and extending the story
Vampire: The Masquerade – Out for Blood Original release date: July 29, 2021	Release years by system: 2021 – Android, iOS, Linux, MacOS, web browsers, Windows
Vampire: The Masquerade – Out for Blood Original release date: July 29, 2021	Notes: Developed and published by Choice of Games; Interactive fiction game
Vampire: The Masquerade – Parliament of Knives Original release date: October 28, 2021	Release years by system: 2021 – Android, iOS, Linux, MacOS, web browsers, Windows
Vampire: The Masquerade – Parliament of Knives Original release date: October 28, 2021	Notes: Developed and published by Choice of Games; Interactive fiction game
Vampire: The Masquerade – Sins of the Sires Original release date: March 24, 2022	Release years by system: 2022 – Linux, MacOS, Windows
Vampire: The Masquerade – Sins of the Sires Original release date: March 24, 2022	Notes: Developed and published by Choice of Games; Interactive fiction game
Vampire: The Masquerade – Heartless Lullaby Original release date: April 21, 2022	Release years by system: 2022 – Windows
Vampire: The Masquerade – Heartless Lullaby Original release date: April 21, 2022	Notes: Developed during the one-month game jam Vampire Jam 2021, and later published by Entalto Studios as an official World of Darkness game; Role-playing game
Vampire: The Masquerade – Bloodhunt Original release date: April 27, 2022	Release years by system: 2022 – PlayStation 5, Windows
Vampire: The Masquerade – Bloodhunt Original release date: April 27, 2022	Notes: Developed by Sharkmob; Battle royale game; Released as an early-access game on September 7, 2021, ahead of the full release
Vampire: The Masquerade – Swansong Original release date: May 19, 2022	Release years by system: 2022 – Nintendo Switch, PlayStation 4, PlayStation 5, Windows, Xbox One, Xbox Series X/S
Vampire: The Masquerade – Swansong Original release date: May 19, 2022	Notes: Developed by Big Bad Wolf and published by Nacon; Role-playing game
Vampire: The Masquerade – Justice Original release date: November 2, 2023	Release years by system: 2023 – Android (Meta Quest 2, Meta Quest 3), PlayStation 5 (PlayStation VR2)
Vampire: The Masquerade – Justice Original release date: November 2, 2023	Notes: Developed by Fast Travel Games; Virtual reality horror game
Vampire: The Masquerade – Reckoning of New York Original release date: September 10, 2024	Release years by system: 2024 – Nintendo Switch, PlayStation 4, PlayStation 5, Windows, Xbox One, Xbox Series X/S
Vampire: The Masquerade – Reckoning of New York Original release date: September 10, 2024	Notes: Developed by Draw Distance and published by Dear Villagers; Visual novel
Vampire: The Masquerade – Bloodlines 2 Original release date: October 21, 2025	Release years by system: 2025 – PlayStation 5, Windows, Xbox Series X/S
Vampire: The Masquerade – Bloodlines 2 Original release date: October 21, 2025	Notes: Initially developed by Hardsuit Labs; production was moved to The Chinese Room by February 2021; Published by Paradox Interactive; Action role-playing game
Vampire: The Masquerade – Clans of London Original release date: April 16, 2026	Release years by system: 2026 – Android, iOS
Vampire: The Masquerade – Clans of London Original release date: April 16, 2026	Notes: Developed by Well Played Games and published by Phoenix Games; Digital collectible card game
Vampire: The Masquerade – Oaths and Ashes Proposed release date: 2026	Proposed system release: 2026
Vampire: The Masquerade – Oaths and Ashes Proposed release date: 2026	Notes: Developed by Revive The Spark; Visual novel
Vampire: The Masquerade – Eternal Whispers Proposed release date: TBA	Proposed system release: TBA
Vampire: The Masquerade – Eternal Whispers Proposed release date: TBA	Notes: Developed by Flyos; CRPG

== Hunter: The Reckoning ==
Game	Details
Hunter: The Reckoning Original release dates: NA: May 21, 2002; EU: July 5, 2002	Release years by system: 2002 – Xbox, GameCube
Hunter: The Reckoning Original release dates: NA: May 21, 2002; EU: July 5, 2002	Notes: Developed by High Voltage Software and published by Interplay Entertainment; Hack-and-slash game; Added to the backward compatibility functionalities for the Xbox 360 in 2007 and for the Xbox One in 2018; Movie rights for the game were acquired by Uwe Boll in 2004
Hunter: The Reckoning – Wayward Original release dates: NA: September 8, 2003; EU: October 17, 2003	Release years by system: 2003 – PlayStation 2
Hunter: The Reckoning – Wayward Original release dates: NA: September 8, 2003; EU: October 17, 2003	Notes: Developed by High Voltage Software and published by Vivendi Games; Hack-and-slash game
Hunter: The Reckoning – Redeemer Original release dates: NA: October 28, 2003; EU: November 21, 2003	Release years by system: 2003 – Xbox
Hunter: The Reckoning – Redeemer Original release dates: NA: October 28, 2003; EU: November 21, 2003	Notes: Developed by High Voltage Software and published by Vivendi Games; Hack-and-slash game
Hunter: The Reckoning – The Beast of Glenkildove Original release date: January 16, 2025	Release years by system: 2025 – Android, iOS, Linux, MacOS, web browsers, Windows
Hunter: The Reckoning – The Beast of Glenkildove Original release date: January 16, 2025	Notes: Developed and published by Choice of Games; Interactive fiction game
Hunter: The Reckoning – Deathwish Proposed release date: Q2/Q3 2027	Proposed system release: 2027 – Personal computers, Xbox Series X/S
Hunter: The Reckoning – Deathwish Proposed release date: Q2/Q3 2027	Notes: Developed by Teyon and published by Nacon; First-person action game

== Werewolf: The Apocalypse ==
Game	Details
Werewolf: The Apocalypse – Heart of the Forest Original release date: October 13, 2020	Release years by system: 2020 – Linux, MacOS, Windows; 2021 – Nintendo Switch, PlayStation 4, Xbox One
Werewolf: The Apocalypse – Heart of the Forest Original release date: October 13, 2020	Notes: Developed by Different Tales and published by Walkabout Games; Visual novel role-playing game
Werewolf: The Apocalypse – Earthblood Original release date: February 4, 2021	Release years by system: 2021 – PlayStation 4, PlayStation 5, Windows, Xbox One, Xbox Series X/S
Werewolf: The Apocalypse – Earthblood Original release date: February 4, 2021	Notes: Developed by Cyanide and published by Nacon; Action role-playing game
Werewolf: The Apocalypse – The Book of Hungry Names Original release date: April 25, 2024	Release years by system: 2024 – Android, iOS, Linux, MacOS, web browsers, Windows
Werewolf: The Apocalypse – The Book of Hungry Names Original release date: April 25, 2024	Notes: Developed and published by Choice of Games; Interactive fiction game
Werewolf: The Apocalypse – Purgatory Original release date: July 23, 2024	Release years by system: 2024 – iOS, Linux, MacOS, Windows
Werewolf: The Apocalypse – Purgatory Original release date: July 23, 2024	Notes: Developed and published by Different Tales; Visual novel role-playing game
Werewolf: The Apocalypse – Rageborn Proposed release date: 2027	Proposed system release: 2027 – Nintendo Switch 2, personal computers, PlayStation 5, Xbox Series X/S
Werewolf: The Apocalypse – Rageborn Proposed release date: 2027	Notes: Developed by Crea-ture; Metroidvania game

== Wraith: The Oblivion ==
Game	Details
Wraith: The Oblivion – The Orpheus Device Original release date: October 29, 2020	Release years by system: 2020 – Android, iOS, smart speakers
Wraith: The Oblivion – The Orpheus Device Original release date: October 29, 2020	Notes: Developed by Earplay and published by Paradox Interactive; Voice-controlled audio adventure game; Played with the virtual assistants Amazon Alexa or Google Assistant, or with the developer's mobile app
Wraith: The Oblivion – Afterlife Original release date: April 22, 2021	Release years by system: 2021 – Android (Oculus Quest 2), PlayStation 4, Windows
Wraith: The Oblivion – Afterlife Original release date: April 22, 2021	Notes: Developed by Fast Travel Games; Virtual reality horror game

== Other ==
Game	Details
World of Darkness Preludes: Vampire and Mage Original release date: February 15, 2017	Release years by system: 2017 – Android, iOS, Linux, MacOS, Windows
World of Darkness Preludes: Vampire and Mage Original release date: February 15, 2017	Notes: Developed by White Wolf Entertainment and Fula Fisken; Published by White Wolf Entertainment for personal computers and by Asmodee for mobile phones; A set of interactive fiction games: Vampire: The Masquerade – We Eat Blood and Mage: The Ascension – Refuge; The first Vampire: The Masquerade video game to be released in over a decade

== Canceled games ==
Game	Details
Werewolf: The Apocalypse Cancellation date: 1997	Proposed system release: PlayStation, Sega Saturn
Werewolf: The Apocalypse Cancellation date: 1997	Notes: Developed by Capcom Production Studio 8; Isometric beat 'em up game; Announced in 1995 as the first in a planned series of video game collaborations between Capcom and White Wolf Publishing; Never officially released, although a prototype of the Sega Saturn version was found and shared through the internet
Mage: The Ascension Cancellation date: 1999–2001	Proposed system release: Personal computers
Mage: The Ascension Cancellation date: 1999–2001	Notes: Developed by HyperBole Studios and White Wolf Publishing; 3D role-playing game in first and third person with single-player and online multiplayer modes; Announced in April 1998, with the developers still looking for a publisher and distributor by 1999; The game's official website had been taken down by 2001
Werewolf: The Apocalypse – The Heart of Gaia Cancellation date: January 2000	Proposed system release: Personal computers
Werewolf: The Apocalypse – The Heart of Gaia Cancellation date: January 2000	Notes: Developed by DreamForge Intertainment and published by ASC Games; Action-adventure game; Announced in September 1998, and delayed multiple times until the publisher shut down in January 2000
Werewolf: The Apocalypse Cancellation date: 2004–2005	Proposed system release: Unknown
Werewolf: The Apocalypse Cancellation date: 2004–2005	Notes: Developed by Troika Games; A werewolf-themed follow-up to Vampire: The Masquerade – Bloodlines by the same development team; Produced as a playable prototype following the completion of Bloodlines
World of Darkness Cancellation date: April 14, 2014	Proposed system release: Unknown
World of Darkness Cancellation date: April 14, 2014	Notes: Developed by CCP Games; Massively multiplayer online role-playing game; In development from 2006 until its cancellation in 2014, after which 56 staff were laid off
