= BattleTech Compendium: The Rules of Warfare =

BattleTech Compendium: The Rules of Warfare is a 1994 game supplement for BattleTech published by FASA.

== Contents ==
BattleTech Compendium: The Rules of Warfare is a supplement in which rules for ground combat are included, compiled from previous releases.

== Reception ==
Robert DeVoe reviewed BattleTech Compendium: The Rules of Warfare in White Wolf Inphobia #52 (Feb., 1995), rating it a 4.5 out of 5 and stated that "This is a very handy sourcebook."

== Reviews ==
- Dragon #216
- Science Fiction Age
- Australian Realms #20
- Armadillo Droppings, Issue 30 (Summer/Fall 1994, p. 17)

== See also ==
- Battletech Field Manual: Draconis Combine
