= Charnel Houses of Europe: The Shoah =

Tabletop role-playing game supplement

- Cover art
- Publishers: White Wolf Publishing
- Publication: March–April 1997
- Genres: Tabletop role-playing game supplement
- Systems: Storyteller System
- Parent games: Wraith: The Oblivion
- Series: World of Darkness
- ISBN: 1-56504-651-X

Charnel Houses of Europe: The Shoah is a supplement published by the Black Dog imprint of White Wolf Publishing in March–April 1997 for the horror role-playing game Wraith: The Oblivion, itself part of the series of horror role-playing games known as World of Darkness.

== Contents ==
Charnel Houses of Europe: The Shoah relates the facts of The Holocaust and addresses the consequences in the setting of the flood of deaths on the Underworld. As Guide du Rôliste Galactique notes, "It is necessary to differentiate the supernatural influences of the Dark World from historical reality: the creatures did not cause the Shoah in this universe, they only profited from it."

== Publication history ==
White Wolf Publishing released Wraith: The Oblivion in 1994 as a part of the World of Darkness series of role-playing games and supported it with many supplements. One of these, 1997's Charnel Houses of Europe: The Shoah, was published by White Wolf's Black Dog imprint, which was used for adult-oriented material. As game historian Shannon Appelcline explained in his 2014 book Designers & Dragons: The '90s, White Wolf "used the Black Dog imprint to put out World of Darkness supplements that would otherwise have been considered too adult", and that "In many ways, these Black Dog books represented a return to form for White Wolf. They offered up new ways to present innovative material, just as Vampire had been cutting edge back when it appeared on the gaming scene in 1991. Some of that innovation was noticed. Charnel Houses of Europe: The Shoah—which adapted the Holocaust for Wraith—and the four-volume, award-winning Giovanni Chronicles (1995–1999)—which traced a family from the 1400s to the modern day—both earned attention and acclaim for White Wolf."

Charnel Houses of Europe is a 126-page softcover book designed by Jonathan Blacke, Richard Dansky, and Robert Hatch with Janet Berliner serving as consultant. The book was illustrated by Larry MacDougall, George Pratt, and Andrew Ritchie, with cover art by Matthew Milberger and Larry Snelly. It was published in March–April 1997.

== Reception ==
In Issue 18 of Arcane, Adam Tinworth was very impressed by this book, saying, "In balancing the emotion with the facts and yet still providing an effortlessly usable supplement, White Wolf has produced a masterpiece. Whether you feel the slaughter of millions is suitable fare for a game is up to you. I for one applaud this first step into adulthood for roleplaying." Tinworth concluded by giving this book an excellent rating of 9 out of 10.

The May–June 1997 issue of Backstab published two reviews:

- "Croc"—the alias of Backstab's editor—was outraged by the concept of the game, saying, "The ugly black dog now offers us a Wraith supplement where we can play it as victims of the Shoah [...] the author offers us a text which is intended to be informative but it is no more than a 3rd grade history book [...] He is incapable of describing in simple words all of the horror of Nazi crimes." Croc concluded by giving the book a rating of 1 out of 10 for the paper which it was written on, and giving it a rating of 0 out of 10 on principle, predicting that the book would soon be forgotten, saying, "It is certain that we will never forget the genocide of the Jews by their Nazi executioners, but this will certainly not be the case with this supplement, nor will it be the case with its author."
- Arnoud Bailly disagreed to some extent, commenting, "Like everyone else, I was initially shocked that someone might have come up with the idea of doing a game based on the Holocaust. And then I read it. And it seems clear to me today that the author did not want Charnel Houses of Europe to be a role-playing supplement [...] but a simple, honest and effective book on the greatest tragedy that humanity has known. A book which tells of the horror of the Nazi machinery, the weakness of the collaborators, the heroism of rebellions, the simple humanity of millions of victims." Bailly concluded that he would never play Wraith using this material, giving it a rating of 8 ouf 10 for its historical content, but 0 out of 10 as a game supplement.

== Other recognition ==
A copy of Charnel Houses of Europe is held in the collection of the Strong National Museum of Play (object 110.2521).

== Other reviews ==
- Casus Belli #104 (Apr 1997) p. 24
- Pyramid V1, #25 (May/June, 1997)
- Envoyer #8
