= HoL (role-playing game) =

Tabletop role-playing game

HoL: Human Occupied Landfill
- Designers: Todd Shaughnessy, Daniel Thron, Chris Elliott
- Publishers: Black Dog Game Factory
- Publication: 1994 (1st edition); September 1, 2002 (2nd edition)
- Genres: Science fiction, comedy
- Systems: Custom

HoL (Human Occupied Landfill, sometimes written as "HōL") is a role-playing game created by Dirt Merchant Games and produced by Black Dog Game Factory, a subsidiary of White Wolf which produced adult oriented RPGs. The HoL Core Rulebook was published in 1994, and was followed up by one other supplement Buttery Wholesomeness in 1995. Although HoL is playable, it was meant as a satire of RPGs. The pages of the books are written by hand, and the authors freely take stabs at other popular role-playing games, particularly Vampire: The Masquerade and Dungeons & Dragons, and those who play them.

== History ==
HoL was first published by Dirt Merchant Games in 1994 and was acclaimed as an independent work of satire. In the 2011 book Designers & Dragons, Shannon Appelcline commented that the game was "funny and profane – even offensive – and it went against the tropes of many RPGs. Though it was probably never played that extensively, HoL did prefigure the wacky directions that indie RPGs would take in the 2000s". White Wolf Publishing published HoL in 1995 as their second new role-playing game not related to the World of Darkness. Hol was adult enough that White Wolf was concerned it could affect their reputation as a publisher geared toward young adults, so White Wolf created the Black Dog Game Factory imprint, which published HoL and its single supplement, Buttery Wholesomeness (1995).

The game was published as a 140-page perfect-bound softcover book, with design by Todd Shaughnessy, Daniel Thron, and Chris Elliot, and cover art by Simon Kono.

== Setting ==
HoL is a science fiction game set in the very distant future where mankind has colonized the entire galaxy. Characters in the game have been either trapped or imprisoned on the planet HoL (The Human Occupied Landfill), which is located outside the galaxy as far away as possible from everyone else. HoL is a penal colony for the scum of the galaxy as seen in the eyes of the C.O.W. (Confederation of Worlds), which is the ruling government body of the human territories.

Over the centuries, mankind has colonized space through the use of the Quazi-Dimensional stardrive, which is powered by energy produced through the mating rituals of Jumpslugs, giant slugs that feed on human corpses and are tended by social rejects in full-body containment suits. The enemy of C.O.W. are the aliens known as the S.N.E.E. (Sedud Neerg Elttil Esoht, or "Those Little Green Dudes" backwards) who constantly plot to take over the universe.

The C.O.W. also uses HoL as a dumping ground for trash, so the entire landscape is covered with mountains of rotting debris, from candy bar wrappers and starship hulls to toxic nuclear waste and used medical syringes. HoL is a breeding ground for cute little bulbous creatures called "Wastems", which characters can capture as pets, eat as tasty pudding snacks, or use for target practice. Beware of the ones with an evil gleam in their eye, however; it could be a Wastit, the carnivorous man-eating version of the timid creatures. Not every critter on HoL is cute and furry, especially the subterranean horrors called Fleshtenders. Victims of Fleshtenders (if they happen to survive) only remember seeing two evil eyes and very big teeth. HoL is also a cesspool of gangs and criminal psychopaths.

Given this world of "kill or be killed", the main goals of characters in HoL are survival and escape. They can be attacked at any time by just about anything from ax-wielding maniacs to mutant creatures. It is a place of all kinds of unimaginable horror – and entertainment, for the citizens of C.O.W. who like to spend their free time watching holographic channels dedicated to the viewing of the non-stop slaughter via explosive robotic cameras called Crickets.

Although it is never verified in any of the HoL game books, some fans of the game have speculated that Hol was once Earth.

== Conception ==
The concept of HoL derived from a conversation Thron had with Cape Cod Community College classmate Duane Waters while driving to school in the winter of 1990–1991. Both were longtime RPGers. Thron, a self-taught graphic artist, was reading a copy of DC Comics' Lobo and Waters remarked that it would be cool if there were a role playing game similar to the comic. It could be called, Waters said, Human Occupied Landfill. Thron took the idea and played around with the concept for months.

Todd Shaughnessy was brought in as a third major writer, with Chris Elliott contributing artwork and writing. Shaughnessy and Elliot refined the gaming system. The game was play tested in the spring of 1992 at Cape Cod Community college with the Dragons Club members and a gaming conventions (Cape Con) on Cape Cod, the University of Rochester, and the U.S Military Academy at West Point, NY.

== Overview of Game Mechanics ==
A few samples of the HoL core rules are given here. HoL uses two six-sided dice (2d6) for all task and combat resolutions. The Game Master in HoL is known as the HoLmeister.

=== Making Characters ===
The HoL core rulebook does not provide a system of character generation, instead offering a set of pre-generated characters, including a young boy with an oversized plasma gun whose survival is completely inexplicable, a pedophile priest, a gamer geek, Elvis Presley, and parodies of two Marvel Comics superheroes: the Silver Surfer and the Incredible Hulk.

The Buttery Wholesomeness supplement provides the rules for creating new characters of the player's design. With that book, players pick a Totem that lists the basic personality of their character. Picking the "Bush Baby" Totem, for example, creates fast, nimble characters. Those of the "Sloth" Totem are generally smart, but slow and lazy in action. The character creation system is as much of a disturbing joke as the system, full of charts that tell players to roll on other charts, and like the character generation system of Traveller (of which it is a parody), a character can die during creation.

=== Stats ===
Each character in HoL has five Stats:

- Greymatta: Intellectual capacity (if any)
- Meat: Physical strength
- Feets: Dexterity
- Mouth: Charisma
- Nuts: Spiritual resolve

Stats are typically rated from −2 (terrible) to +10 (nigh godly), though both higher and lower ratings are possible.

=== Skills ===
Each stat has a number of skills associated with it. Given a world of senseless violence, most skills in HoL are simply there to better bash someone's head in, or blast them to oblivion with weapons. Useful skills include:

- Operate Starship and Chew Gum at the Same Time: A Greymatta skill that says it all.
- Repair Toasters 'n' Stuff: A Greymatta skill for fixing things.
- Turn Radios into Howitzers: A Greymatta skill for MacGyvering things.
- Organize Fundraiser: The Mouth skill based art of coaxing money and other goodies out of people.
- Make Someone Stop Living With Your Fist: The Meat skill for bashing in skulls while unarmed.
- Making Sharp Things Go Through Soft Things That Scream and Bleed: A Meat skill. Self-explanatory.
- Scathing (Ooooo, Big Word!) Sarcasm: A Mouth skill for humiliating your foes into piles of tears.
- Whining Until You Get What You Want: A Mouth skill that forces victims to give in to your demands.
- Make Everything You Say Sound More Important Than the Voice of God: A Mouth skill for fast talking and persuasion.
- That Psycho Bruce Lee Shit: A Feets skill for dazzling your enemy with martial arts.
- Withstand/Enjoy Hellish Agony: A Nuts skill for remaining conscious after being tortured by watching Barney & Friends for 24 hours straight. Closely related to "Withstand Bagpipes."
- Spot Wastit: A Greymatta skill. Only useful if you enjoy keeping your face intact. As stated in the core rulebook, a character without this skill cannot tell the difference between a wastem and a wastit, even if the wastit is walking away from a mutilated body with a bloody knife in its hands.

=== Task Resolution ===
Resolving the success or failure of a task involves rolling two six-sided dice (2d6) and adding the character's Stat rating and related Skill values, plus a difficulty modifier set by the HoLmeister. Difficulty typically scales between +4 (Easier than a Cheap Streetwalker) to −4 (Bogusly Difficult), although higher and lower modifiers are possible. A total of 15 or above is a success, 14 or lower is a failure; more detail is given by the General Chart (one of many charts in HoL).

Die rolls of 2, "Snake Eyes", are always a very, very bad thing (regardless of bonuses), and results in whatever horrors the twisted mind of the HoLmeister decides to inflict upon the character. HoLmeisters are encouraged to take out pent up aggressions in these situations. Players may also randomly roll to determine the character's fate on another chart, where they might get lucky and only snap a groin muscle.

Die rolls of 12, "Box Cars", are always a very good thing, and allow the player to reroll the dice and add it to the twelve they've just rolled. Rerolls also add a point to the "Grace of God" Pool (see below) which can save a character in moments of certain, otherwise unavoidable death. Multiple rerolls are possible, as is getting a snake eyes on a reroll.

=== Combat ===
When two HoL characters meet, they usually end up trying to kill each other, so combat is just one of those things a character could face every minute of their HoL life. As in most RPG systems, opposing forces roll for initiative (a d6 roll + Feets Stat) to see who goes first.

There are two kinds of attacks in HoL, Melee (with hand-to-hand weapons) and Ranged (with projectile weapons). Attackers attack, and Defenders either Dodge or Parry the attack. The Attacker rolls 2d6 + Stat + Skill to attack, rolling on the Combat Chart (which is similar to the General Chart, i.e. rolls lower than 15 miss). The total attack roll is modified by the Defender's Feets Stat + 2d6 (this acts as the base Difficulty Modifier against the attack) plus any other modifiers the HoLmeister sees fit (e.g. for cover).

Range attacks are modified by range. Things that are really close get a +4 bonus to hit, and extremely far get a −4 (or worse) penalty.

=== Damage ===
Weapons in HoL can be anything; a rolled-up newspaper, broken bottle, Enemy-B-Gone™, Kitty Kitty Bang Bangs™ or whatever. Every weapon has an Anguish Value and a Damage Number. Anguish Values are rated from 1 (staple in a finger) to 20 (Unprotected Re-entry into the Atmosphere). The higher the number, the more the weapon "hurts" the character, and is strictly for the enjoyment of role-playing. Damage Numbers have no upper limit.

Everyone in HoL has 20 Wound Levels that start at zero and increase according to how much damage they have taken. To figure out damage, the character's Meat Stat + Armor Value (if any) is subtracted from the weapon's Anguish Value. Once that number is determined the character finds the number on a Damage Multiplier Chart and rolls a d6 to determine the intensity of the multiplier of the weapon's Damage Number. The weapon's Damage Number is then multiplied that many times (from x1 to x5) and added to the character's current Wound Level.

Characters suffer Stat penalties that worsen according to how many Wound Levels they have taken:

Wounds	Penalty
5+	−1 to all rolls (Hurtin')
10+	−2 (Smoking the pain pipe)
14	−3 (Need a doctor)
15	−4 (Feasting with agony)
16	−5 (Feeling imminent doom)
17+	Unconscious
20+	The Big Dirt Nap!

=== Rewards ===
Surviving is the best reward. A more generous HoLmeister can reward players P.R.I.C.Kudos, which can raise a Skill point by one or add another first level Skill to a character's sheet. They can also reward Big P.R.I.C.Kudos that can raise a Stat by one.

Another feature of the game is the "Grace of God" pool. Each character is given a random number of GoG points at creation, rolled by the HoLmeister, but never revealed to the player. In situations of the direst peril, a player can utter the words "Praise Jesus" and spend a GoG point. This sets into action a series of seemingly random and freakish events that prove to be the character's salvation from their current predicament. The example given in the core rulebook depicts a space station's re-entry into HoL's atmosphere being broken by a fruitfly, thus saving the character. Because the player has no idea how many GoG points the character has, it is likely that eventually the rule will be invoked without any GoG points actually left in the GoG pool. This garners the character one "Wrath of God" point. Some HoLmeisters activate the WoG point immediately after the situation the characters were in is resolved by the GoG mechanic, while others save the resolution of the WoG point for later, but in either case, the character is marked for the most unfair, heinous and unforgiving fate the HoLmeister can dream up. These situations are clearly defined as "worse than any snake-eyes roll" and the section explaining the WoG reminds the players once again that "the HoLmeister is allowed to cheat. Whenever he wants to. Period."

== Reception ==
In the November 1994 edition of Pyramid (Issue #10), Derek Pearcy recommended the game, saying, "Enter Hol, you won't be sorry."

In the May 1995 edition of Dragon (Issue 217), Lester Smith called the game "a shockingly, breath-takingly hilarious read." Smith enjoyed that "The designers poke merciless fun at gamers, the hobby in general, related hobbies, other games, ... corporate America, and even themselves." Smith agreed that the humor was the focus of the book, saying, "I hardly think the game's the point." However, he did believe a game was possible "if you are lunatic enough."

In a 1996 poll of Arcane readers to determine the 50 most popular roleplaying games of all time, HoL was ranked 39th. Editor Paul Pettengale commented: "People often buy game books purely to read, but with Hol that's pretty much the point, although there is supposed to be a rules system in there."

== Reviews ==
- Shadis #27 (May, 1996)
- Rollespilsmagasinet Fønix (Danish) (Issue 8 – May/June 1995)
- Casus Belli #87
- Australian Realms #23
