= Guildbook: Spooks and Oracles =

Cover art by John Cobb and Eric Lacombe, 1998

Guildbook: Spooks and Oracles is a supplement published by White Wolf Publishing in 1998 for the horror role-playing game Wraith: The Oblivion.

== Contents ==
Guildbook: Spooks and Oracles is the sixth in a series of supplements that describes the history of the Arcanos (wraithly powers) and the societies that surround each. This book covers the Spook and Oracle Guilds, and details their powers, and provides templates for characters.

The book is divided into two separate sections, one devoted to Spooks, and the other to Oracles.

=== Spook Guild ===
The Spook section begins with a short story, "A Road to Steel and Souls", a continuation of a short story published previously in Guildbook: Pardoners and Puppeteers. A Prologue that introduces the narrator is then followed by four chapters:

1. . "Those Honor Bound": The internal organization of the Guild
2. . "Inquiries (A History)": The history of the Guild.
3. . "The Job and How to Do It": Ten new powers, ten new qualities, and eight relics and artifacts.
4. . "The Rank and File": Five pre-generated characters.

An appendix describes several important members of the Guild, and gives a blank character sheet.

=== Oracle Guild ===
The Oracle Guild section continues the short story "A Road of Steel and Souls", and then is divided into five chapters:

1. . "Deja Vu": An overview of the Guild.
2. . "Inside the Unblinking Eye": Various methods for making divinations and predictions.
3. . "And It Was Written": A history of various predictions and divinations which have guided the Guild in the past.
4. . "Secrets": A description of recent events.
5. . "(Un) familiar Faces": Five pregenerated characters.

The section concludes with a blank character sheet.

== Publication history ==
From 1995 to 1998, White Wolf published a series of six Guildbook splatbooks that described the Arcanos (wraithly powers) and the cultures that form around them. The sixth and final book of that series was Guildbook: Spooks and Oracles, a 152-page perfect-bound book written by Mark Cenczyk and Dawn Kahan, with illustrations by John Cobb, Mike Danza, Pia Guerra, Fred Harper, Henry Higgenbotham, Eric Lacombe, and Jill Thompson, with cover art by John Cobb and Eric Lacombe.

== Reception ==
In the July 1998 edition of Dragon (Issue #249), Ray Winninger called the previous books in the Guildbook series "outstanding, and Spooks and Oracles is no exception." Although Winninger criticized a few of the Oracle templates as "a tad too self-referential and hokey", he concluded with a strong recommendation, saying, "this book is still a must for Wraith fans."
