= Wraith: The Oblivion – The Orpheus Device =

- Promotional art
- Developer(s): Earplay
- Publisher(s): Paradox Interactive
- Producer(s): Eddy Webb
- Artist(s): Aerin Artessa
- Writer(s): Richard Dansky; Dave Grossman (narrative designer)
- Composer(s): Xiao'an Li
- Series: Wraith: The Oblivion
- Platform(s): Android, iOS, smart speakers
- Release: October 29, 2020
- Genre(s): Audio, adventure
- Mode(s): Single-player

Wraith: The Oblivion – The Orpheus Device is an audio-based adventure video game developed by Earplay and published by Paradox Interactive on October 29, 2020 for Android, iOS, and smart speakers, and is played using the virtual assistants Amazon Alexa or Google Assistant, or the Earplay mobile app. It is based on White Wolf Publishing's tabletop role-playing games Wraith: The Oblivion (1994) and Orpheus (2003), and is part of the larger World of Darkness series.

The story sees the player take the role of an investigator who communicates with dead spirits to help them and learn how they died. The game was written by Richard Dansky and Dave Grossman, and was developed as an adaptation of the Choose Your Own Adventure game book format for voice recognition technology. It was well received for having an innovative concept.

== Overview ==
The Orpheus Device is a voice-controlled, audio-based adventure game set in the World of Darkness; depending on the virtual assistant used, the player can also alternatively type their responses rather than speaking with their voice. The player takes the role of an investigator who uses stolen credentials to access a machine called the Orpheus Device, which enables one to communicate with the dead. The investigator uses the device to talk to the Marten family, whose spirits remain in their house from when they were still alive, to learn how they died, and to help them resolve unfinished business and move on to a better place. Depending on what the player says to the characters, the story sometimes branches, with different outcomes to conversations and eventually different endings.

== Development ==
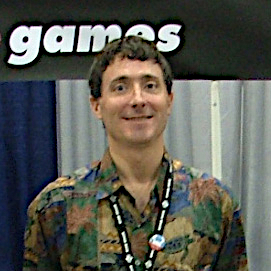
The game was written by Dave Grossman (pictured in 2007) and Richard Dansky.

The Orpheus Device was developed by Earplay, based on White Wolf Publishing's tabletop role-playing game Wraith: The Oblivion (1994), along with the related tabletop game Orpheus (2003); it was also designed to be accessible to newcomers to the World of Darkness series, targeting anyone who likes ghost stories. It was written by narrative designer Dave Grossman and author Richard Dansky, the latter of whom was a writer for the Wraith: The Oblivion tabletop game, and produced by Eddy Webb, with visuals by Aerin Artessa and music by Xiao'an Li.

The game was developed as an adaptation of the Choose Your Own Adventure game book format for voice recognition technology. Earplay met the publisher Paradox Interactive through Webb, who had previously worked at White Wolf Publishing, and the two parties thought that voice-controlled digital stories and tabletop role-playing games had a lot in common, leading to a partnership. Dansky was brought onto the project for his experience as a game writer and as a developer of the tabletop game, and ran the tabletop game for Earplay staff to make sure that they could evoke the original.

The developers described challenges and advantages with the game's format: the audio interface had to work together with the rest of the audio, fitting in but also being distinct enough that its function is clear to players; but being audio-based, the developers were not limited by what they could show visually, and instead could rely on players' imaginations and use word choices, sound design, and tone of voice. Because of the format, Dansky found it important to keep the writing tight and focused, to make sure that they keep the player's attention. Due to some heavy themes in the game, such as the character Hector's alcoholism, the developers took care to do research beforehand, to be able to depict the subjects accurately and respectfully. The branching dialogue had to be planned out carefully, as each branching point would drastically increase the amount of dialogue; Grossman mapped out the structures of the conversations, which Dansky then filled out with dialogue.

== Release and reception ==
A teaser for the game was first shown in September 2016 at the Grand Masquerade, an annual World of Darkness event held in New Orleans, and the game was announced in October the same year, with a demo released on October 31. The game was planned to see a full, paid release later that year, but was delayed several times to account for advances in technology and related services, and then again to let the developers put more time into the Jurassic Park game they were also making. Following this, Earplay's license to develop a Wraith: The Oblivion game had expired, and so they had negotiate a new deal with Paradox Interactive; during this time, they also made tweaks to the story to make sure that it would match up with the virtual reality game Wraith: The Oblivion – Afterlife that was also in development.

The full game was eventually released for free by Paradox Interactive on October 29, 2020, for Android, iOS, and smart speakers, on which it is played using the virtual assistants Amazon Alexa or Google Assistant, or the Earplay mobile app.

Gamasutra found the game intriguing, describing it as "charting relatively unexplored territory", and as something for game developers to take note of due to the involvement of Grossman and Dansky, due to their past work on video games including The Secret of Monkey Island, Day of the Tentacle, Tom Clancy's The Division, and Trials of the Blood Dragon. Voicebot.ai found the game fun and "appropriately spooky", and considered it one of the best voice-based games of 2020.
