= Battletech Field Manual: Draconis Combine =

Battletech Field Manual: Draconis Combine is a 1996 tabletop game supplement published by FASA for BattleTech.

== Contents ==
Battletech Field Manual: Draconis Combine is a supplement in which the military force of House Kurita—the Draconis Combine Mustered Soldiery (DCMS)—is explored. The DCMS distinguishes itself by adhering to the code of Bushido, reflecting the cultural inheritance of the Kuritan people through a strong emphasis on honor and personal dignity. The manual opens by examining the military's central position within the Combine's five-pillar structure, and how Bushido has evolved over the last century to adapt to the changing nature of warfare across the Inner Sphere. The book proceeds with an in-depth look at the organization of DCMS assets, from BattleMechs to Aerospace forces, infantry, and armor divisions. It also explores rank insignia, uniforms, decorations, and outlines military career progression through the Combine's academies and training schools. New BattleMech models, pieces of equipment, battle armor, and warships are introduced with accompanying record sheets and backstories. The main part of the manual is a comprehensive registry of DCMS regiments, including prestigious elite units like the Swords of Light, regional District regulars, specialized groups such as the Sun Zhang regiments, and the Ghost regiments—formed from the Yakuza underworld by Theodore Kurita. Each unit is presented with its historical background, strength profile, and unique insignia, adding color and identity to their narrative.

== Reception ==
Alex Bund reviewed Field Manual: Draconis Combine for Arcane magazine, rating it a 9 out of 10 overall, and stated that "Complete with eight pages of colour artwork, Draconis Combine is another excellent release for a game which continues to grow in both strength and depth."

== Reviews ==
- Australian Realms #30
