= Renegades (Wraith: The Oblivion) =

1998 role-playing game supplement

- Cover art by D. Alexander Gregory
- Publishers: White Wolf Publishing
- Publication: August–October 1998
- Genres: Tabletop role-playing game supplement
- Systems: Storyteller System
- Parent games: Wraith: The Oblivion
- Series: World of Darkness
- ISBN: 1-56504-636-6

Renegades is a tabletop role-playing game supplement released by White Wolf Publishing in August–October 1998 for use with the horror game Wraith: The Oblivion, and is part of the World of Darkness series.

== Contents ==
Renegades describes characters in the world of Wraith who rebel against the Hierarchy and the Heretics. The book covers the history of how the revolution in the Shadowlands occurred, the main types of renegades (protesters, political opponents, idealists, philosophical opponents, outlaws, and deserters), and describes tactics, skills, abilities and archetypes. The book also provides five ready-to-play characters and biographies of six famous renegades.

== Publication history ==
Renegades was written by P. D. Cacek, Jackie Cassada, Tom Deitz, and Nicky Rea, with interior art by Jason Felix, Tom Fowler, Darren Frydendall, Fred Harper, Leif Jones, Brian LeBlanc, and Matt Roach, and cover art by D. Alexander Gregory. It was released by White Wolf Publishing in August–October 1998, as a 128-page softcover book. It has since also been released as an e-book.

== Reception ==
The reviewer from the online second volume of Pyramid stated that "this Wraith book really captures the ironic, self-referential humor that marks the better White Wolf books. As Richard Dansky's last turn as Wraith line editor, it's an unpretentious romp about the most interesting of the Wraiths, full of great ideas with the occasional bit of self-mocking grandeur to add levity."

== Other reviews ==
- Backstab #11 (Sep-Oct 1998) p. 37
