= Guildbook: Masquers =

Guildbook: Masquers is a 1995 role-playing game supplement published by White Wolf Publishing for Wraith: The Oblivion.

== Contents ==
Guildbook: Masquers is a supplement in which postmortem society is explored, focusing on the Masquers Guild and their mastery of Moliate—a supernatural art that lets wraiths shape plasm, the ethereal substance that replaces flesh. This plasm is described as a mix of soul, belief, and game mechanics, far more adaptable than the corporeal form it replaces. Masquers are figures of great influence and ambiguity. Their ability to reshape themselves and others makes them versatile—capable of becoming assassins, spies, or artisans. But such power breeds unease in the Shadowlands because of their talent for transforming fellow wraiths into grotesque decor. The sourcebook begins with a short story that feeds into a metaplot continuing from previous guildbooks. It then delves into the guild's history and structure, their uneasy ties with other supernatural beings, inventive applications of Moliate, and finally, character templates.

== Reception ==
Adam Tinworth reviewed Guildbook: Masquers for Arcane magazine, rating it a 7 out of 10 overall, and stated that "While [its] shortfalls do take the edge off an otherwise excellent sourcebook, Guildbook Masquers does make significant inroads into developing wraith society, and the very different nature of postmortem existence. As such, it's a valuable addition to any Wraith storyteller's library."

== Reviews ==
- Casus Belli V1 #98 (Oct 1996) p. 8
- Dosdediez V2 #16 Nov 2000) p. 19
