= The Complete Book of Elves =

Sourcebook for fantasy role playing game

The Complete Book of Elves is a supplementary sourcebook published by TSR in 1993 for the 2nd edition of the Advanced Dungeons & Dragons fantasy role playing game.

== Contents ==
The Complete Book of Elves was created to give players a deeper understanding of the Elven race within the world of Advanced Dungeons and Dragons, from day-to-day life, culture, myths and religion, to new abilities and spells.

=== Table of contents ===
Elven Lore
Chapter	Titles	Notes
One	The Creation of Elves	-
Two	Variations on a Theme	Aquatic Elves, Dark Elves, Grey Elves, High Elves, Sylvan Elves, Half-Elves, Elves of the Worlds.
Three	Physical Attributes	Physiology, Stages of Life, Diet, Elven Interfertility, The Elven Bond, Elven Music.
Four	Mental Attributes	Outlook, Individual worth, Emotion and Logic, Generational Splits, Attitudes Towards Other Races.
Five	Elven Society	The Elven Language, Livelihood, Rituals, Eleven Holy Days.
Six	The Elven Myths	The Legend of Fiona Cassiltenirra, Jarsali and the Treant, Halimath's Pride, Haranavei Koehlanna, Caelestis.
Seven	The Death of Elves	Accidental or Violent Death, Funeral Ceremonies
Eight	Elven Dwellings	The Grey Elves' City, The High Elves' Tree Town, The Sylvan Elves' Encampment.

Elven Role-Playing
Chapter	Titles	Notes
Nine	Optional Rules	Level Limit Expansion, Extra Proficiencies, Combat Modification, Archery Modifications, Using Bows as Weapons, Arrow Breakage and Loss.
Ten	Character Creation and Kits	Standard Elf Abilities, The Elf Subraces, Elf PC Kits.
Eleven	Elven Equipment	Feywine, Elven Harp, Honey Leather, Sashling, Thistledown, Elven Bow, Arrows(Useful), Elven Armor
Twelve	The Magic of Elves	New Elf Spells, Magical Items, Artificial Limbs
Thirteen	Elven Campaigns	Campaign Worlds
	Appendices	Index, MC: Avariel (Winged Elf), MC: Cooshee, Character Record Sheets

== Publication history ==
In 1989, TSR published the three core rulebooks for the second edition of their role-playing game Dungeons & Dragons. The company immediately followed this with a long series of supplementary splatbooks outlining new powers and abilities for all races and classes. One of these was The Complete Elves Handbook, written by Colin McComb and published in 1993, with interior color illustrations by Brom, Larry Elmore, and John and Laura Lakey, and black and white art by Terry Dykstra. It was originally advertised in TSR's 1992 Fall/Winter catalog as "a detailed look at the culture, society, habits, strengths, and weaknesses of the many nations of elves."

In Dragon, The Complete Book of Elves was mentioned throughout the series of magazines. Where a player Brian J. Van Court showed concern for the missing magical cards that could be implemented including such sources in a letter to the magazine. In Bruce A. Heard's piece Lord of the Skies touched based on that of the "winged-elves" which were adapted from the Avariel in The complete book of Elves and Dragons Magazines issue #51.

The Complete Book of Elves was also asked about by the community in Dragon Magazine Sage Advice Asking a series of questions on the use of multiple actions to combine on that of quick-draw and double-arrow shot. As well further detail on the use of trick shots by one reader. While another reader enquired about the use of that of the huntsmen to be given a "smaller penalty" when tracking "other non-rangers" as there was a hole in the kit's description on what the reduction of the penalty was.

Thirty years after its publication, author Colin McComb admitted The Complete Book of Elves was "dreadful", and acknowledged the negative influence the book had on the 2nd edition of AD&D, apologizing for "making elves so incredibly powerful and unbalanced that all of our AD&D games were henceforth ruined until 3rd Edition D&D came to save us."

== Reception ==
In Issue 10 of Australian Realms, Brad Smart found the descriptions of the various subraces "too short for my liking, providing little additional information over what is set out in the individual campaign source books." He also pointed out that "the vast majority of the information on elven life, society, attitudes, culture and legends is useful only to players in generic 'standard' AD&D campaigns [...] I found it useless for an elf in say a Dark Sun world." Smart found the color plates "a pleasure to look at" but found the black and white illustrations "very bland." He concluded, "Compared with the other handbooks, The Complete Book of Elves holds its own, but does not stand out, useful for elf players, and those who buy every release, but otherwise read someone else's."

In the March 1994 issue of Magia i Miecz, Maciel Kocuj reviewed the large number of "splatbooks" published by TSR, and found The Complete Book of Elves "very similar in content [to other 2nd Edition splatbooks]. In some places the material is weaker, in some place stronger, and it brings a lot of both curiosities and boring repetitions."

== Reviews ==
- Casus Belli #92
