= Guildbook: Pardoners and Puppeteers =

1997 tabletop role-playing game supplement

- Cover art by John Cobb
- Publishers: White Wolf Publishing
- Publication: October–November 1997
- Genres: Tabletop role-playing game supplement
- Systems: Storyteller System
- Parent games: Wraith: The Oblivion
- Series: World of Darkness
- ISBN: 1-56504-665-X

Guildbook: Pardoners and Puppeteers is a tabletop role-playing game supplement released in October–November 1997 by White Wolf Publishing for use with their horror game Wraith: The Oblivion, and is part of the World of Darkness series.

== Contents ==
Guildbook: Pardoners and Puppeteers is a sourcebook intended to be used with the tabletop role-playing game Wraith: The Oblivion, where players take the roles of wraiths. It is the fifth in a series of supplements that describes the history of the Arcanos (wraithly powers) and the societies that surround each. This book covers the Pardoner and Puppeteer Guilds, the former being "ghostly healers" and the latter being "renegade body jumpers". The book is divided into two separate sections, one devoted to Pardoners, and the other to Puppeteers.

=== Puppeteer Guild ===
The Puppeteer section begins with a short story, "A Road to Steel and Souls", a continuation of a short story published previously in Guildbook: Haunters. Four chapters then follow:

1. . "No Strings Attached": An overview of the Puppeteer Guild.
2. . "The Puppeteers and the Risen": How members of the Guild return to the real world by using a body that resembles a vampire.
3. . "Pulling Strings": Two new arts available to Guild members.
4. . "Behind the Puppet Show Curtain": Five pre-generated characters.

An appendix describes four important members of the Guild, and gives a blank four-page character sheet.

=== Pardoner Guild ===
The Pardoner Guild section continues the short story "A Road of Steel and Souls", and then is divided into six chapters:

1. . "Spiritual Exercises": How new members join the Guild.
2. . "The Pardoner's Tales (history)": An overview of the history of the Guild.
3. . "True Confessions": Describes the inner workings of the Guild, its structure, and relations with various other Arcanos powers.
4. . "Secrets": A description of recent events.
5. . "The Art of Castigation": Eight new powers, and four new artifacts.
6. . Five pregenerated characters.

The section concludes with a blank character sheet.

== Production and release ==
Guildbook: Pardoners and Puppeteers was written by Jackie Cassada, Elizabeth Ditchburn, Heather Grove, and Nicky Rea, with illustrations by Richard Clark, John Cobb, Fred Harper, Anthony Hightower, Fred Hooper, Matthew Mitchell, Chuck Regan, Christopher Shy, and Ron Spencer, with cover art by John Cobb and Eric Lacombe. It is part of the Guildbook line of books, but is at 160 pages longer than previous ones, as it covers two guilds.

The book was released by White Wolf Publishing in October–November 1997 as softcover book, and has since been re-released as an e-book.

== Reception ==
Rick Swan reviewed Guildbook: Pardoners and Puppeteers for Dragon #244. Swan comments that "There's plenty of useful campaign material, including several new artifacts (soul lantern, hoodoo doll) and merits (storm warning, friends in high places). But what lingers in the mind are the characters: angst junkies, sin eaters, serial killer skin-riders. Creepy stuff. And when it comes to Wraith, the creepier, the better."
