= The Risen =

- Cover art by Larry MacDougall
- Illustrators: John Cobb, Eric Lacombe, Brian J. LeBlanc, Larry MacDougall, Andrew Ritchie, Joshua Gabriel Timbrook
- Writers: Elizabeth Ditchburn; Heather Grove; Richard Dansky
- Publishers: White Wolf Publishing
- Publication: June 1996
- Genres: Tabletop role-playing game supplement
- Systems: Storyteller System
- Parent games: Wraith: The Oblivion
- Series: World of Darkness
- ISBN: 1-56504-663-3

The Risen is a tabletop role-playing game supplement published by White Wolf Publishing in June 1996 for use with the horror game Wraith: The Oblivion. It adds the risen as playable characters: wraiths that inhabit dead bodies to become walking dead.

== Description ==
The Risen is a sourcebook intended to be used with the horror tabletop role-playing game Wraith: The Oblivion, where players take the role of the wraiths of dead characters, and introduces the risen as playable characters. Usually wraiths exist in the Shadowlands and cannot affect the land of the living, but these characters have died with such unrealized dreams or passions that they gain the ability to attempt to inhabit a dead body to rise and become a walking dead to fulfill its unfinished business. In addition, each character is also haunted by a Shadow, a malevolent spirit of the force known as Oblivion, which seeks to take over the character to turn it into an evil Spectre.

== Production and release ==
The Risen was developed by Richard Dansky and written by Elizabeth Ditchburn and Heather Grove, with interior artwork by John Cobb, Eric Lacombe, Brian J. LeBlanc, Andrew Ritchie, and Joshua Gabriel Timbrook, and cover art by Larry MacDougall. It was designed with a theme of obsession, with the titular risen so compelled by their passions that they more than any other character type in Wraith: The Oblivion are willing to take big risks. The risen were written to defy zombie tropes, being driven, articulate revenants who often can pass for humans.

The supplement was released by White Wolf Publishing in June 1996 as an 80-page softcover book, and has since also been released as an e-book.

== Reception ==
The Risen was critically acclaimed: (Note: See Arcane, d8, Dragon, Shadis) d8 called the book "brilliant", and considered it "a mandatory purchase for any Wraith player or storyteller", and Dragon called it an essential guide for players looking to role-play as zombie characters. Arcane gave it 9 out of 10 and described it as inspiring, and said that the one thing keeping them from giving the book a perfect score was that it is not as useful in an on-going campaign, as risen are not intended to make up an entire party of player characters.

Critics found the book useful, and liked the addition of risen, considering them an interesting alternative with its own niche, that feel differentiated from both vampires and wraiths, and push the boundaries of what can be done in a Wraith: The Oblivion campaign. They also appreciated the larger cross-over potential with other World of Darkness games that The Risen brought, enabling more interaction with the rest of the World of Darkness setting and giving opportunities to mix the themes and gameplay systems of Wraith: The Oblivion and Vampire: The Masquerade.

The rules for risen characters were well received for being easy to understand and use; Arcane liked how they connect to both the main Wraith: The Oblivion rules and to the risen's drive, as they must pursue their passions to acquire Pathos, which is what powers them. Shadis thought that this made it easy for storytellers to run intense and motivated stories around a risen, although noted that this meant they were primarily useful in one-on-one campaigns with a storyteller and just one player; for group play, they considered risen player characters mostly useful in groups that otherwise consist of vampire characters. Arcane agreed, finding risen to facilitate dramatic storytelling as Vampire: The Masquerade player characters, as Werewolf: The Apocalypse opponents or allies, or as endings for Wraith: The Oblivion characters. Australian Realms found the coverage of the risen comprehensive, but thought a problem with the character type was that once a risen has dealt with their unfinished business, they have nothing more to work toward.

The writing and presentation were well received, with critics praising the backgrounds and examples. Arcane called the book an involving read, and liked its execution of the zombie concept, with tragic and driven revenants rather than the typical mindless creatures of horror films. d8 found both the writing and illustrations excellent, and Arcane called the gritty artwork "splendidly evocative". Dragon particularly mentioned MacDougall's cover art as appealing, wishing for a poster of it. Cyril Pasteau, the former director of the French game magazine Backstab, found the illustrations sub-par, however, considered the book to have too much "noise" surrounding the information that is directly usable when playing.

== Reviews ==
- Australian Realms #29
