= Necropolis: Atlanta =

1994 tabletop role-playing game supplement

- Cover by Gerald Brom
- Designers: Jennifer Hartshorn
- Illustrators: Thomas Berg, Gerald Brom, Robert Dixon, Darryll Elliott, Anthony Hightower, Larry MacDougall, E. Allen Smith, Richard Thomas, Joshua Gabriel Timbrook
- Writers: Sam Chupp; James A. Moore
- Publishers: White Wolf Publishing
- Publication: 1994
- Genres: Tabletop role-playing game supplement
- Systems: Storyteller System
- Parent games: Wraith: The Oblivion; Vampire: The Masquerade
- Series: World of Darkness
- ISBN: 1-56504-164-X

Necropolis: Atlanta is a tabletop role-playing game supplement released in 1994 by White Wolf Publishing for use with their games Wraith: The Oblivion and Vampire: The Masquerade, and is part of the larger World of Darkness series. It covers the city of Atlanta as it is portrayed in the series, with descriptions of its supernatural population and its history and geography.

The book was developed by Jennifer Hartshorn and written by Sam Chupp and James A. Moore, with a theme of rebirth following ruin, and the confrontation of a history of slavery. It was critically well received for its coverage of Atlanta, its theme, and its potential for cross-over play between World of Darkness games. The cover art, painted by Gerald Brom, left a great impression on game designer Shane Lacy Hensley and inspired him to design the role-playing game Deadlands.

== Overview ==
Necropolis: Atlanta is a setting sourcebook intended to be used with the horror tabletop role-playing games Wraith: The Oblivion and Vampire: The Masquerade, where players respectively take the roles of wraiths and vampires, although primarily written for Wraith. It describes the city of Atlanta as it is portrayed in the World of Darkness series' setting, where it is reinterpreted as having a population of wraiths and vampires, and covers its history in the human world and the land of the dead, starting before the arrival of European settlers, and going through the American Civil War and until modern day.

The book also describes the local geography, including major haunted locations, neighborhoods, and modes of transport, and the supernatural characters residing there. This includes various factions and groups of wraiths, including an antagonist group, the white supremacists the Sons of the Imperial Dragon, and the hierarchy of wraiths ruling over the city's undead. The vampire population and intrigues relating to them are described in the 16-page segment "Atlanta by Night".

== Production ==
Necropolis: Atlanta was developed by Jennifer Hartshorn and written by Sam Chupp and James A. Moore. Richard Thomas was the art director for the project, and worked together with an art team including Thomas Berg, Gerald Brom, Darryll Elliott, Anthony Hightower, Larry MacDougall, E. Allen Smith, and Joshua Gabriel Timbrook. Brom was in charge of the cover art, and painted it at the gaming convention Gen Con '94 based on a design by Robert Dixon.

The production team designed the book with a theme of rebirth following ruin. They decided that they could not ignore the existence of white supremacists in the portrayal of Atlanta and its history of slavery, so they chose to portray white supremacy and other forms of bigotry while condemning them, and depicted the city with an "almost tangible" sense of passion and rage building over its past that needs to be confronted. The setting was written to exemplify Southern Gothic, with a sense of "crumbling splendor" uncommon to modern American cities.

The supplement was released by White Wolf Publishing in 1994, as a 120-page softcover book, and has since also been released as an e-book. It remained the only Wraith: The Oblivion book released to focus on one city in the land of the dead, although was also intended to be usable as a template or example for storytellers (Note: The person leading the game is called the "storyteller" in World of Darkness games, a role called "gamemaster" or "dungeon master" in other role-playing games.) creating original settings for their Wraith: The Oblivion campaigns.

== Reception and legacy ==
Necropolis: Atlanta was critically well received: the French game magazine Casus Belli described it in 1996 as one of four Wraith: The Oblivion supplements particularly worth reading, along with Dark Reflections: Spectres, Haunts, and The Hierarchy. The Danish Rollespilsmagasinet Fønix similarly described it as the most important and useful Wraith: The Oblivion book, for its coverage of a major Wraith location, and as something that shows what White Wolf Publishing is good at.

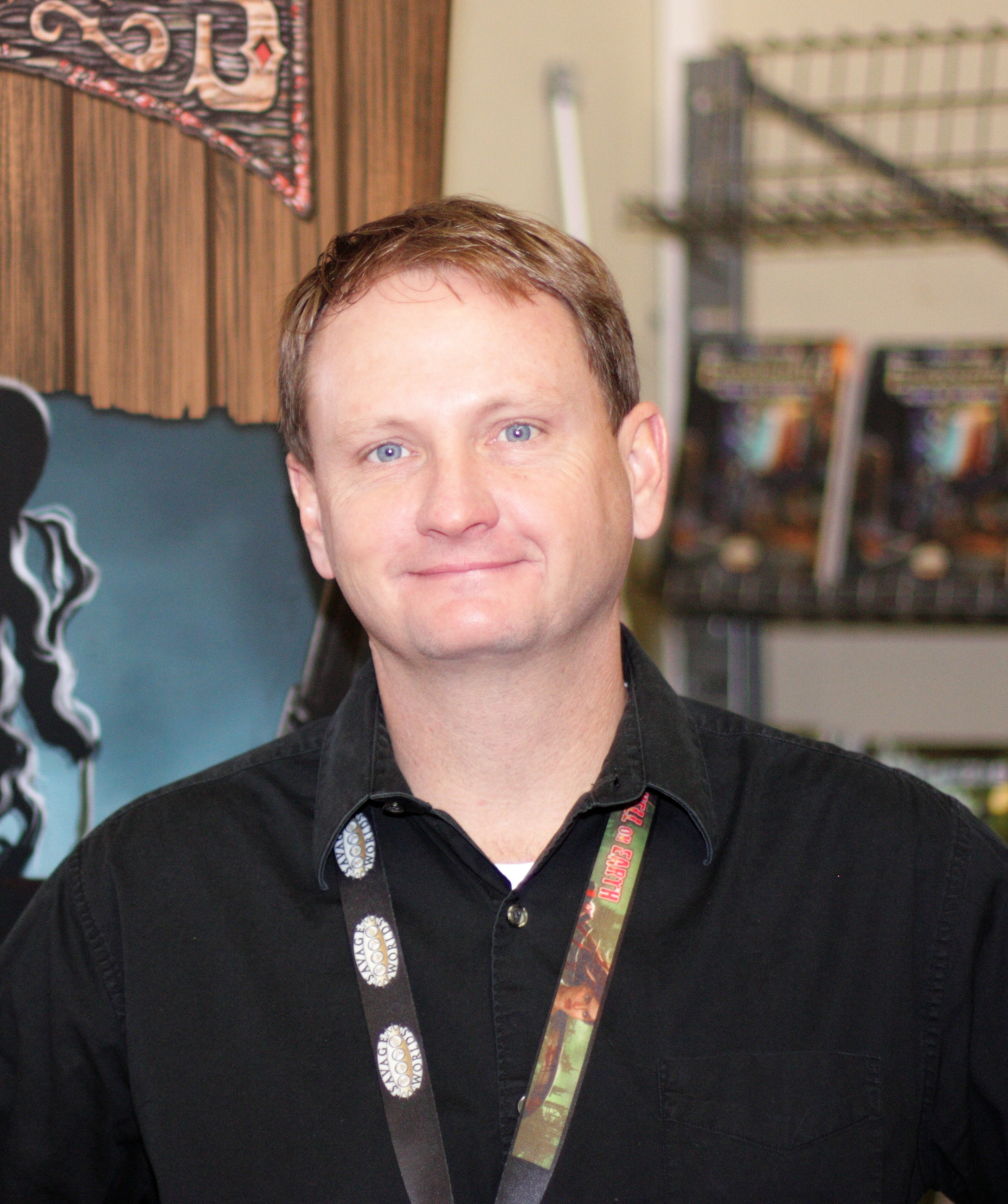
The cover art inspired Shane Lacy Hensley to write the game Deadlands.

Critics liked the book's setting, with Rollespilsmagasinet Fønix praising the thoroughness of the coverage of Atlanta and the descriptions of the supernatural inhabitants and history, while Casus Belli thought it was a good setting sourcebook in the style of Vampire: The Masquerade's By Night series of city books, and that it gives readers a good sense of what a necropolis can look like. The atmosphere and style were also well received: the Italian magazine Computer + Videogiochi liked the dark tone, and Rollespilsmagasinet Fønix found the gothic style and laid-back atmosphere appealing. The book was also praised for its cross-over potential between different World of Darkness games due to its coverage of an Atlanta vampire community and its compatibility with the other games in the series; Rollespilsmagasinet Fønix wished to see that type of cross-over possibility more often in World of Darkness books.

The book's cover art was influential on game designer Shane Lacy Hensley: he saw Brom painting it at Gen Con '94, and the horror of the Confederate vampire depicted left such an impression on him that he kept thinking about it throughout his fourteen-hour drive home from the convention, as he began to envision a game about zombies and cowboys. He wrote a draft based on the concept, which eventually became the Western game Deadlands. Pinnacle Entertainment Group released it in 1996 as its first role-playing game, and also used cover art by Brom.
