= Black Dog Game Factory =

Former publisher of adult-themed RPG books

Black Dog Game Factory was a publishing label founded in 1995 by White Wolf, Inc. for the publication of a number of adult-themed books in their original World of Darkness RPG line. Although several products were critically acclaimed, the audience was limited, and Black Dog ceased publication in 2002.

== Publication history ==
White Wolf Publishing published Vampire: The Masquerade in 1991, the first in a series of horror role-playing games titled World of Darkness. In 1994, Dirt Merchant Games published the satirical RPG HoL that used several adult themes like sex and drugs. White Wolf Publishing was interested in republishing HoL, but they were concerned it might damage the company's reputation as a publisher of entertainment intended for young adults. For that reason, White Wolf created the Black Dog Game Factory imprint, lifting the name from a company mentioned in Werewolf: The Apocalypse (1991).

White Wolf also used the Black Dog imprint to release more adult-themed supplements for Vampire, Werewolf, Mage, and Wraith in 1995. After that initial flurry of activity, output from Black Dog decreased to an average of two books a year. As game historian Shannon Appelcline noted in 2014's Designers & Dragons, "In many ways, these Black Dog books represented a return to form for White Wolf. They offered up new ways to present innovative material, just as Vampire had been cutting edge back when it appeared on the gaming scene in 1991. Some of that innovation was noticed. Charnel Houses of Europe: The Shoah (1997)—which adapted the Holocaust for Wraith—and the four-volume, award-winning Giovanni Chronicles (1995–1999)—which traced a family from the 1400s to the modern day—both earned attention and acclaim for White Wolf."

The constant friction between pushing the envelope and damaging White Wolf's reputation eventually led to the end of Black Dog. Appelcline explained that "Despite that critical acclaim, Black Dog's smaller audience and the chance that it could still damage the reputation of White Wolf with its more intense and grittier subject matter eventually spelled the end for the imprint. Like Streetfighter, Black Dog was another attempt to break new ground in the late '90s that ultimately went nowhere." The last publication produced under the Black Dog name was in 2002.

== Description ==
Books published by Black Dog had adult or mature themes, though not all Black Dog-published books dealt with sexual material. Some are labeled as adult because they deal with themes of strong violence or evil (such as Hunter Book: Wayward), religious themes (Cainite Heresy), or controversial subject matter (the Holocaust-based Charnel Houses of Europe: The Shoah).

Books published by Black Dog include:

Name	Game line	Release date
The Giovanni Chronicles, a four-part series Part I Part II Part III Part IV	Vampire: The Masquerade	? April 1, 1996; March 12, 1998; April 291 1999
Montreal by Night	Vampire: The Masquerade	November 1, 1996
Clanbook: Baali	Vampire: The Dark Ages	June 1, 1998
The Cainite Heresy	Vampire: The Dark Ages	February 24, 1999
Freak Legion: A Player's Guide to Fomori	Werewolf: The Apocalypse	December 1, 1995
Destiny's Price	Mage: The Ascension	December 1, 1995
Charnel Houses of Europe: The Shoah	Wraith: The Oblivion	February 1, 1997
Dark Reflections: Spectres	Wraith: The Oblivion	December 1, 1995
Dead Magic	Mage: The Ascension	July 2000
HoL: Human Occupied Landfill	HoL	1995 (re-release)
Hunter Book: Wayward	Hunter: The Reckoning	January 28, 2002

The imprint also published Eternal Hearts, an erotic novel set in the universe of Vampire: The Masquerade. A book for Aberrant, titled Cults of Personality, was planned for release, but the game line was cancelled before the book made it to print.
