= Guildbook: Haunters =

Role-playing game supplement

- Cover art by John Cobb
- Illustrators: John Cobb, Fred Hooper, Darren Fryendall, Eric Lacombe, Henry Higginbottom
- Writers: Lucein Soulban
- Publishers: White Wolf Publishing
- Publication: 1997
- Genres: Tabletop role-playing game supplement
- Systems: Storyteller System
- Parent games: Wraith: The Oblivion
- Series: World of Darkness
- ISBN: 1-56504-604-8

Guildbook: Haunters is a supplement published by White Wolf Publishing in 1997 for the horror role-playing game Wraith: The Oblivion.

== Content ==
Guildbook: Haunters describes The Haunters, a Guild that frequently crosses and influences the mortal world, with hopes of one day tearing down the barrier between them altogether.

The book starts with a short story, a continuation of one that appeared in a previous publication, Guildbook: Masquers. The book is then divided into four chapters:

1. . "The recruiting process": A description of the guild, and the four factions that compete over potential members.
2. . "History": Describes the history of the guild, its grand alliance with the "Wyld" in the 19th century, and its much reduced influence in the present day.
3. . "It's all about the Wyld": Introduces new uses for Pandemonium, as well as new virtues and faults, and a powerful artifact.
4. . "So you want to be a haunted...": Five pre-generated characters.

The book also contains an appendix with descriptions of four important members of the guild, and a blank 4-page character sheet.

== Publication history ==
From 1995 to 1998, White Wolf published a series of six Guildbook splatbooks that described the Arcanos (wraithly powers) and the cultures that form around them. Guildbook: Haunters is the fourth book of the series, a 72-page square-spined softcover book written by Lucein Soulban, with interior art by John Cobb, Fred Hooper, Darren Fryendall, Eric Lacombe and Henry Higginbottom, and cover art by John Cobb. It was published by White Wolf in 1997.

== Reception ==
In the June 1997 edition of Arcane (Issue 20) Adam Tinworth claimed that as a stand-alone product, the book had "little use", but then stated that, when used with the other Guildbooks, that it was "absolutely essential for the serious Wraith referee". Tinworth concluded by giving the book an average rating of 7 out of 10, the same score given to the previously reviewed Guildbook: Sandmen.

== Other reviews ==
- Fractal Spectrum, Summer 1997 (Issue 16)
