= Freak Legion: A Player's Guide to Fomori =

Freak Legion: A Player's Guide to Fomori is a supplement published by White Wolf Publishing in 1995 for the horror role-playing game Werewolf: The Apocalypse.

== Contents ==
Freak Legion is a supplement which details the Fomori, a type of mutant created when a Bane spirit possesses a human, and how players can create a fomor player character. The book consists of six chapters and an appendix, prefaced by a comic and introduction:

- Comic: "Food for Wyrms" tells the story of Mort, a human who becomes a fomor (Artwork by Steve Prescott)
- Introduction: Content warning, and introduction to the concept of the Fomori.
1. Character creation
2. Breeds
3. Supernatural Fomori
4. Recruitment: Groups that create or use fomori
5. Low Society: Fomori society
6. Storytelling: Advice for Storytellers
- Appendix: Some of the banes that possess humans

== Description ==
Freak Legion is a 112-page book that was created for White Wolf's "Black Dog Game Factory" label, which produced content labelled for mature audiences due to explicit descriptions of death, disfiguring illness, and violence. It was written by Steve Brown, Phil Brucato, John Scott Burrows, Jacki Cassada, Jim Comer, Lucien Dark, Beth Fischi, Christopher Howard, Jenn Lindberg, Jim Moore, Nicky Rea, and Richard Watts. Interior art was by Richard Thomas, Steve Prescott, Mike Chaney, Anson Maddocks, and Matt Milberger; and cover art was by Aileen E. Miles.

== Reception ==
In the January 1996 edition of Arcane (Issue 2), Andy Butcher found that "For experienced World of Darkness referees – especially those with a regular Werewolf group – Freak Legion has a lot to offer. It's not exactly required reading, and definitely not for the squeamish or easily offended. But if you're on the lookout for something that's a little different (or a lot more yucky) to pit against your players, there's a lot on offer here." Butcher gave it an average rating of 7 out of 10 overall.

In the February 1996 edition of Casus Belli (Issue 91), Fabrice Colin commented that in terms of usable content, "Freak Legions turns out to be an excellent supplement, and in 112 pages, does the trick." However, Colin found the explicitly grisly descriptions weakened the book: "The voluntarily gory introduction and comic strip [...] made me laugh a little: this kind of pre-teen provocation always has a pathetic side."

== Reviews ==
- Casus Belli V1 #94 (May 1996)
