= Haunts (Wraith: The Oblivion) =

1994 tabletop role-playing game supplement

- Cover by Henry Higginbotham and George Pratt
- Designers: Jennifer Hartshorn
- Illustrators: Dave Allsop, Stuart Beel, Tom Berg, John Cobb, Brian Dugan, Henry Higginbotham, Anthony Hightower, George Pratt, E. Allen Smith, Richard Thomas, Joshua Gabriel Timbrook, Drew Tucker
- Writers: Bill Bridges, Jackie Cassada, Richard Dansky, Harry Heckel, Ian Lemke, Judith McLaughlin, James A. Moore, Ehrik Winters
- Publishers: White Wolf Publishing
- Publication: December 1994
- Genres: Tabletop role-playing game supplement
- Systems: Storyteller System
- Parent games: Wraith: The Oblivion
- Series: World of Darkness
- ISBN: 1-56504-610-2

Haunts is a tabletop role-playing game supplement released in December 1994 by White Wolf Publishing for use with their game Wraith: The Oblivion, and is part of the larger World of Darkness series. It covers haunts – locations where the border between the lands of the living and the dead is particularly weak, allowing the player-character wraiths to take form in the human world – with instructions for creating new haunts for one's campaigns, and descriptions of ones already existing in the game's setting.

The book was developed by Jennifer Hartshorn, with art direction by Richard Thomas. Several writers and artists worked on the book, and based the haunts on real-world locations in North America and Europe; among the writers were Richard Dansky, who had never written commercial work before, but would go on to join White Wolf Publishing and become one of their most prolific writers and a major influence on the Wraith: The Oblivion game line. The supplement was well received for its usefulness to storytellers, (Note: The person leading the game is called the "storyteller" in World of Darkness games, a role called "gamemaster" or "dungeon master" in other role-playing games.) and for the international scope of its setting, but criticized for being uneven in its quality.

== Overview ==
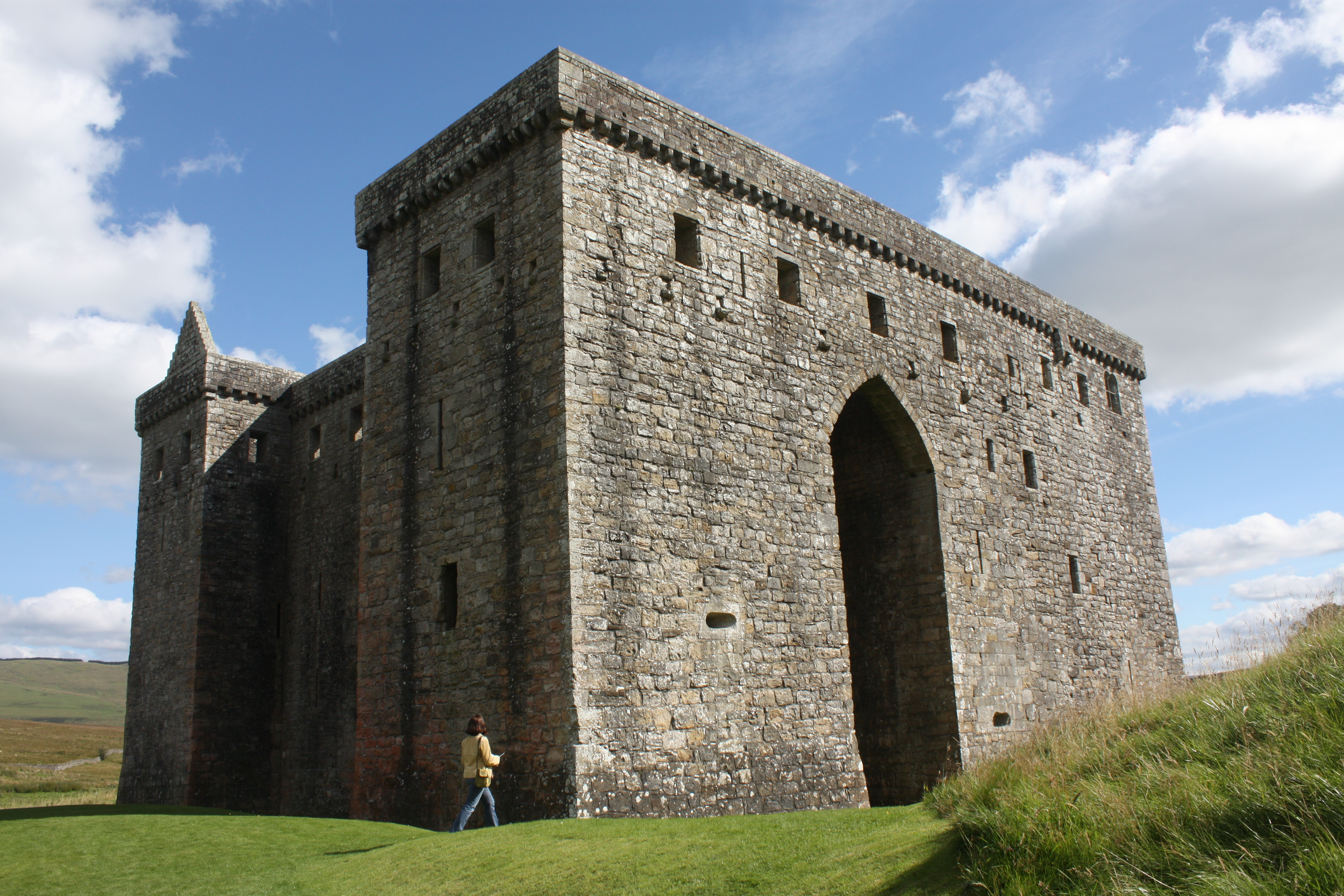
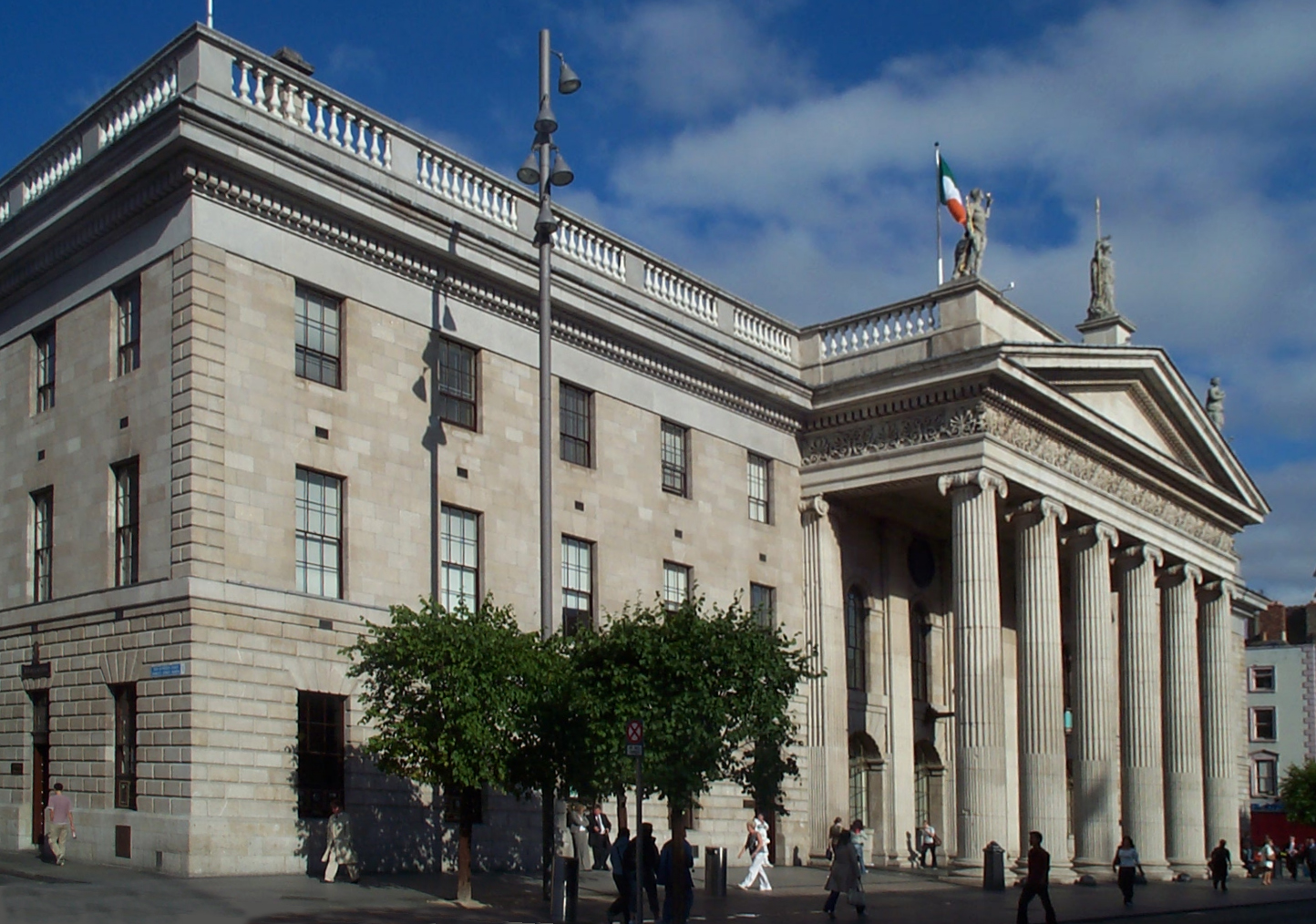
The haunts are based on real places, such as Hermitage Castle (top) and the Dublin General Post Office.

Haunts is a sourcebook for use with the horror tabletop role-playing game Wraith: The Oblivion, where players take the roles of wraiths – dead people's spirits. The book covers haunts, which are locations in the game's setting where the shroud separating the land of the dead and the land of the living is thin enough to allow wraiths to reach through and materialize, and where they seek shelter.

The book gives storytellers instructions on how to construct new haunts for their Wraith: The Oblivion campaigns; it also contains descriptions of established haunts in the game's setting, for how they exist both in the land of the living and the land of the dead, along with information on their history and the characters appearing there, and plot hooks to inspire scenario creation.

The eight haunts described include the Tillinghast Mansion in Providence, Rhode Island; Hermitage Castle in Scotland; the Virginia State Capitol in Richmond; The Hanging Gardens Hotel and Casino in Atlantic City, New Jersey; the Chapel of St. John the Divine in the Algarve, Portugal; Blackbeard's death site in Ocracoke, North Carolina; the General Post Office in Dublin, Ireland; and the former village of Khatyn in Belarus.

== Production ==
Haunts was developed by Jennifer Hartshorn, and was written by Bill Bridges, Jackie Cassada, Richard Dansky, Harry Heckel, Ian Lemke, Judith McLaughlin, James A. Moore, and Ehrik Winters. The art director for the project was Rich Thomas; the art team also included interior artists Dave Allsop, Stuart Beel, Tom Berg, John Cobb, Brian Dugan, Anthony Hightower, E. Allen Smith, Richard Thomas, Joshua Gabriel Timbrook, and Drew Tucker, and the cover artists Henry Higginbotham and George Pratt.

Each of the book's chapters had its own creative team of writers and artists who gave the chapters their own styles, and based each of the haunts on real-world locations. Haunts was Dansky's first commercial writing; Hartshorn knew him from college, and contacted him about working on Wraith: The Oblivion due to his academic writing about horror writer H. P. Lovecraft. Dansky wrote his parts for Haunts as a freelancer while proctoring SAT practice tests, and would later come to join publisher White Wolf Publishing, becoming one of their most prolific writers and a big influence on the Wraith: The Oblivion game line.

The supplement was released by White Wolf Publishing in December 1994 in the form of a 128-page softcover book, as one of the first releases for Wraith: The Oblivion's first edition. It has since also been released as an e-book, and saw a Spanish release in 2002.

== Reception ==
Reception
Review scores
Source	Rating
Dosdediez	5/5 stars
Rollespilsmagasinet Fønix	2.5/5 stars

The French game magazine Casus Belli liked the book, describing it in 1996 as one of four Wraith: The Oblivion supplements particularly worth reading, along with Dark Reflections: Spectres, The Hierarchy, and Necropolis: Atlanta; the Spanish magazine Dosdediez similarly considered the book "essential" for Wraith: The Oblivion players, and particularly liked the Lovecraftian portrayal of the Tillinghast Mansion, and the ghost pirates of Blackbeard's death site.

Casus Belli found the book helpful to storytellers seeking to add things onto their campaigns or to create new scenarios for their players, and considered haunt creation easy. They considered the haunted location concept it adds to the game essential for the genre, and found the writing to be varied and managing to avoid tired clichés. They also liked the book's international scope, with its multiple locations across Europe, compared to other books in the World of Darkness series that often focus solely on the United States. The Danish publication Rollespilsmagasinet Fønix was more critical: they too found the locations interesting, but considered the quality of the chapters very uneven, and thought that it at times does not fit well thematically in the Wraith: The Oblivion game line.
