= Orpheus (role-playing game) =

Tabletop role-playing game

- Cover art
- Designers: Bryan Armor; John Chambers; Genevieve Cogman; Richard Dansky; B. D. Flory; Harry L. Heckel; Ellen Kiley; James Kiley; Matthew McFarland; Dean Shomshak; Colin A. Suleiman
- Publishers: White Wolf Publishing
- Publication: September 2, 2003
- Systems: Storyteller System

Orpheus is a tabletop role playing game by White Wolf Publishing, set in a microcosm of the World of Darkness. Unlike the other World of Darkness game lines, Orpheus has a specifically planned metaplot and a set number of published books. Although it uses the same system as White Wolf's other games, ghosts and spirits are the exclusive focus of this story. Other supernatural creatures in the World of Darkness are strongly discouraged from entering the events of Orpheus. It is, however, tied with Wraith: The Oblivion, White Wolf's previous game dealing with the afterlife; some of the events in Orpheus are related to Ends of Empire, the final book in the Wraith: The Oblivion line.

== Volumes ==
There are six books in total in the Orpheus line; the first is the main rulebook, which holds the rules used throughout the series. The five that follow carry out a specific, albeit optional, plotline, told through fiction and roleplaying, and expand on the roleplaying tools presented in the first game. They are, in chronological order:

Title	White Wolf Product Number	ISBN
Orpheus	WW21000	1-58846-600-0
Crusade of Ashes	WW21001	1-58846-601-9
Shades of Gray	WW21010	1-58846-602-7
Shadow Games	WW21011	1-58846-603-5
Orphan-Grinders	WW21012	1-58846-604-3
End Game	WW21015	1-58846-605-1

Orpheus is noteworthy in that it began the trend of White Wolf creating game series with a limited number of supplements. This cont continued with the Chronicles of Darkness games Promethean: The Created, Changeling: The Lost, Hunter: The Vigil, and Geist: The Sin-Eaters, all of which were initially planned as limited releases.

There also was an anthology based on Orpheus named Orpheus: Haunting the Dead (WW11905 / ISBN 1-58846-837-2).

== Character types ==
Characters in Orpheus are either living individuals capable of astral projection (via meditation or cryonics) or are ghosts of the recently deceased. It is assumed that characters work for the Orpheus Group, a company that employs the talents of projectors and spirits to investigate and clear ghostly activity and perform other tasks difficult for those without access to the world of the dead. The way a person manifests as a ghost is called the Lament; two Laments are projection-based, while two are based on a person being dead.

- Skimmers use drugs and meditative techniques to temporarily eject their souls from their bodies. While they can enter and exit the spirit world quickly, their close connection to their empty shells means damage they take as a ghost manifests on their bodies.
- Sleepers are cryonically frozen; once the body reaches a certain temperature, it is "dead" and ejects the spirit. While in stasis, the body is treated with special drugs to keep necrosis from setting in. While it keeps sleepers from the close connections skimmers have that allows them to be injured, the process means that both entering and leaving the world of ghosts is a slow process.
- Spirits are your run-of-the-mill dead person, souls who have unfinished business that allow them to remain on earth. Most who work for Orpheus have a high degree of independence because of the remarkable willpower they held in life that transitions to death; not all spirits can keep their independent attitudes when they die and become doomed to repeat themselves endlessly.
- Hues are spirits with one major difference; while alive, they took the designer drug pigment. Pigment keeps a spirit from feeling ultimately fulfilled, so while a hue may be as stubborn as a spirit, they have more fragile forms and are closer to their dark sides.

Each character has a set of special traits, called a Shade, which determine how they manifest and what ghostly powers they can use and which ones they cannot. There are eight Shades in total; the first five were introduced in the Orpheus corebook, while the remaining three were introduced in three of the supplements.

- Banshees are the empathetic shades, full of compassion. They manifest their abilities of emotional manipulation, physical damage, and looking into the future through their voices.
- Haunters are those who care for things over people. This focus allows them to manipulate inanimate objects and machines to a disturbing degree.
- Poltergeists are usually full of rage, either quiet or overt. This allows them to pick up objects without touching them directly, and also to alter their own forms in violent ways.
- Skinriders are control freaks. They are granted the ability to possess the bodies of others and bend them to their will.
- Wisps are the trickster shade. They have abilities that allow them to draw attention, escape in a flash, or manipulate ghostly items.
- Phantasms, introduced in Shades of Gray, are the artists and dreamers. They can see and manipulate the dreams of the living.
- Orphan-Grinders, introduced in The Orphan-Grinders, are ghosts who gave in to their dark sides, and then came back. They can use the abilities of the dark ghosts, or Spectres.
- Marrow, introduced in End Game, can adapt to any situation. Appropriately, they are shapeshifters and also have a rapport with animals.

== Antagonists ==
Along with ghosts as antagonists, there are also rival projection companies, such as Terrel and Squib, and a new designer drug called pigment or black heroin that allows users to see the spirits of the dead. There are also dark spirits called Spectres, some of which are corrupted spirits and hues, and others that have spawned from an unknown but powerful source. These create much of the storyline and challenges the players must face as they move through the series.

== Reviews ==
- Backstab #46
- Realms of Fantasy
