= Giovanni Chronicles =

Role-playing game supplements

- Giovanni Chronicles II cover art
- Type: Tabletop role-playing game supplements
- Creator: Daniel Greenberg
- Publisher: White Wolf Publishing
- First release: Giovanni Chronicles: The Last Supper; 1995
- Latest release: Giovanni Chronicles IV: Nuova Malattia; 1999
- Parent series: World of Darkness

Giovanni Chronicles is a series of adventure modules by White Wolf Publishing for their tabletop role-playing game Vampire: The Masquerade. The series spans four books: Giovanni Chronicles: The Last Supper (1995), Giovanni Chronicles II: Blood & Fire (1996), Giovanni Chronicles III: The Sun Has Set (1998), and Giovanni Chronicles IV: Nuova Malattia (1999).

== Contents ==
Giovanni Chronicles II: Blood & Fire is an adventure set in the year 1666 in which the player characters become caught up in the plans of the Giovanni.

== Production ==
The Last Supper was designed by Daniel Greenberg. The series was created for White Wolf's "Black Dog Game Factory" label.

The first two books were re-released in 2000 in the compilation Giovanni Saga I.

== Reception ==
The series was popular among Vampire: The Masquerade players.

Andy Butcher reviewed Giovanni Chronicles II: Blood & Fire for Arcane magazine, rating it a 7 out of 10 overall. Butcher comments that "Blood & Fire has great potential, especially if the same group has previously played The Last Supper and the players reprise their previous roles."

== Reviews ==
- Rollespilsmagasinet Fønix (Danish) (Issue 10 - October/November 1995)
- Envoyer (German) (Issue 45 - Jul 2000)
- Backstab #10 (Giovanni Chronicles III)
