= World of Darkness (video game) =

Canceled massively multiplayer online role-playing game

- Promotional art
- Developer: CCP Games
- Director: Reynir Hardarson
- Producer: Chris McDonough
- Artist: Erling Sævarsson
- Series: World of Darkness
- Release: Canceled
- Genre: Massively multiplayer online role-playing
- Mode: Multiplayer

World of Darkness, also known as World of Darkness Online, was a cancelled massively multiplayer online role-playing game (MMORPG) in development by CCP Games from 2006 until its cancellation in 2014. It was based on the World of Darkness series of tabletop role-playing games by White Wolf Publishing.

Players were to have assumed the roles of humans who could be turned into vampires of one of seven vampire clans with various abilities. The gameplay was going to be nonlinear and focus on social interaction and politics, with goals reached both through combat and through players forming alliances with each other.

The development was long and troubled, with organizational and managemental issues, including staff being moved to other CCP Games projects for months at a time, significantly slowing down progress and leading to work being abandoned and redone repeatedly. The team size was also significantly decreased throughout the production, with several rounds of layoffs.

Although World of Darkness was considered one of the highest-profile games to have been canceled in the 2010s, the cancellation and layoffs were not unusual for the video game industry, something The Guardian considered a scandal in itself. Preview impressions of the game were generally positive, particularly of its visuals and experimental gameplay, while later impressions based on leaked screenshots were less favorable.

== Gameplay ==
The gameplay involved players using vampiric abilities, and forming alliances. In this screenshot, a vampiric player character feeds on a human character's blood.

World of Darkness was planned to be an open world, single-server massively multiplayer online role-playing game. It was meant to take place at night and have a supernatural horror theme, and was based on the World of Darkness series' setting – the shared fictional universe of several of White Wolf Publishing's tabletop role-playing games, including Vampire: The Masquerade. Players were planned to start the game as humans, with the possibility of being turned into a vampire from one of seven vampire clans with access to various vampiric powers, such as sucking blood, running quickly, and leaping high in the air. Other World of Darkness character types such as werewolves or mages were not planned to be playable at launch, but would possibly appear as non-player characters (NPCs) or as player characters in an expansion pack or in a separate game; ghouls were planned to be included as minions to the player characters, which could be sent on missions.

The gameplay was going to be nonlinear, and focused on social interaction and politics among players, with web-based communication tools available. The game was to emulate the politics of World of Darkness tabletop games, allowing players things such as achieving the role of a vampire prince by being voted into office and rule a stylized version of one of several real-life capital cities, and communicate with other cities. Cities were to be divided into different kinds of zones, including social zones like a coffeehouse district where players could meet up, and zones where players could fight territory battles. Like in Vampire: The Masquerade, combat and killing was not going to be necessary, as players instead were to be able to reach their goals through creating alliances with other players; player-versus-player and player-versus-environment combat was however also going to be to an option, and permanent death would be applied to player characters who die. The game was also planned to include tools to create items, distinctly different from typical item crafting systems in games.

== Development ==
=== Production and cancellation ===
World of Darkness was developed by CCP Games from 2006 until its cancellation in 2014.

World of Darkness was developed by the Icelandic developer CCP Games, and was directed by Reynir Hardarson and produced by Chris McDonough, with concept art by Erling Sævarsson. The game was said to be in its early planning stages during the announcement of CCP Games' merger with White Wolf in late 2006; in June 2007, CCP Games estimated that the game would take them four to five years to finish. The game was eventually unveiled three years later, along with a trailer and concept art, at White Wolf's Grand Masquerade event in New Orleans in 2010, with a planned release date of 2012.

The next year, CCP Games laid off 20% of its staff, about 120 people, as they had been stretching their resources too thin; they moved their focus to their MMORPG Eve Online, but did not cancel World of Darkness, instead letting its development continue with a significantly reduced development team; by 2012, the game was still in its pre-production phase, with a team of 60 working full-time on it. The team had grown to 70 by early 2013, 15 of which were laid off later in the year. By early 2014, CCP Games described the game as still "years away". In April of the same year, the game was canceled, and 54 staff members at CCP Atlanta were laid off, with remaining staff there shifting to working on Eve-related games.

According to World of Darkness staff, the cancellation came after a troubled development, which they described as having issues relating to management and organization; staff often had to switch to working on other projects for 3–6 months, and at times the entire World of Darkness team was working on Eve projects, particularly leading up to the 2009 Eve expansion Apocrypha. Because staff kept getting moved between World of Darkness and other projects, progress was significantly slowed down, and partially finished features and systems ended up getting abandoned and re-started several times. According to former CCP Games developer Nick Blood, very little of the core game was implemented five years into the production, with nothing to appreciate for people who were not already fans of the setting. After Paradox Interactive acquired the World of Darkness series in 2015, including the produced assets from the video game, they said that the art and ideas that had been created for it would be used in other World of Darkness projects.

=== Design ===
CCP Games wanted the game to be more similar to live action role-playing games than massively multiplayer online games; to achieve this, they focused on encouraging human interactions and social gameplay by rewarding players for creating social networks, similarly to those in the World of Darkness tabletop games. Comparing it to Eve Online, they were hoping to attract a larger number of female players, citing Eve Online's lack of accessibility, its complexity, and bad game design as reasons women would be less likely to be interested in it, as well as its science-fiction setting compared to World of Darkness's supernatural horror.

Influenced by the games DayZ and Rust, CCP Games wanted World of Darkness to have an open world and unstructured game mechanics, allowing for natural player interactions. The developers also wanted the game to focus on traversal and movement in a vampiric, "super-powered individual" manner, something McDonough described as akin to a "vampire simulator"; they did not plan to put much focus on developing functionality for human player characters at launch, but considered developing expansions for human characters who are hunters or mages.

The developers chose to set the game in the original World of Darkness setting rather than its successor, Chronicles of Darkness, despite the original World of Darkness line of tabletop games already having ended; this was because of how Vampire: The Masquerade was what White Wolf was known for, and was the more influential game, even though some tabletop players might care more about the Chronicles of Darkness setting.

== Reception ==
Although GameSpot described World of Darkness as one of the most notable games to have been canceled in the last few years as of 2019, other publications found it typical for the industry: The Guardian wrote that the "real scandal" was that job cuts like those are common in the video game industry, Polygon described it as neither shocking nor unusual, and Kotaku called it disappointing but unsurprising.

Preview impressions of World of Darkness were positive, praising its visuals and how it felt new and experimental; PCGamesN considered it one of the most interesting MMOs in development at the time, with a lot of potential, and IGN described it as "super-stylish". Following the cancellation, Polygon echoed these sentiments, calling the experience it was promising unique, and noting its freedom and ability to manipulate game politics interesting; because of this, and how there were no future World of Darkness games expected at the time, they thought the cancellation hit particularly hard for fans of the series. Following the emergence of leaked screenshots and a manual from the game, however, Rock, Paper, Shotgun thought that the game looked poor, describing it as feeling "too MMORPG-y" and not enough like World of Darkness, lacking its mystique, sexiness and excitement. Gamereactor similarly considered it a good example of the lacklusterness of CCP Games' projects outside of Eve Online.
