= Guildbook: Sandmen =

1996 tabletop role-playing game supplement

- Cover art
- Publishers: White Wolf Publishing
- Publication: March 1996
- Genres: Tabletop role-playing game supplement
- Systems: Storyteller System
- Parent games: Wraith: The Oblivion
- Series: World of Darkness
- ISBN: 1-56504-662-5

Guildbook: Sandmen is a tabletop role-playing game supplement released in March 1996 by White Wolf Publishing for use with their horror game Wraith: The Oblivion, and is part of the World of Darkness series.

== Contents ==
Guildbook: Sandmen is a sourcebook intended to be used with the tabletop role-playing game Wraith: The Oblivion, where players take the roles of wraiths. It is the second release in the Guildbook line of books, which develop the culture and societies of each of the wraith guilds. This book describes Sandmen, a cult of ancient spirits with backgrounds in classical theatre, who can shape the dreams of unwary sleepers into bizarre "Dreamscapes" that affect other mortals.

== Production and release ==
Guildbook: Sandmen was written by Beth Fischi. It was published by White Wolf Publishing in March 1996 as a softcover book, and has since been re-released as an e-book.

== Reception ==
Reception
Review scores
Source	Rating
Arcane	7/10

Adam Tinworth of Arcane was ambivalent about this book, saying "This book is by no means an essential buy, as the ideas won't suit every group's style of play. But for any campaign that features a Sandman, it is a useful source of inspiration and colour in an environment that, by nature, lacks either."

Rick Swan of Dragon thought that the book "delivered a crypt-full of chills." He concluded "For experienced 'Wraith-ers', this is role-playing at its most chilling."
