= Wraith: The Oblivion – Afterlife =

- Developer: Fast Travel Games
- Publisher: Fast Travel Games
- Director: Erik Odeldahl
- Designer: Daniel Kihlgren Kallander
- Programmer: Casper Renman
- Series: Wraith: The Oblivion
- Platforms: Android (Oculus Quest); Microsoft Windows; PlayStation VR
- Release: Oculus Quest & Rift; April 22, 2021; Steam VR; May 25, 2021; PlayStation VR; October 27, 2021; PICO 4; March 3, 2023
- Genre: Survival horror

Wraith: The Oblivion – Afterlife is a virtual reality survival horror video game developed and published by Swedish studio Fast Travel Games, released in 2021. It is based on White Wolf Publishing's 1994 tabletop role-playing game Wraith: The Oblivion, and is part of the larger World of Darkness series. The game was released for Microsoft Windows, Oculus Quest, PlayStation 4, and PICO 4.

The player takes the role of a wraith that has recently died, as they explore the Barclay Mansion and uncover mysteries of the afterlife. It is made as an exploration of what it means to be human, and is influenced by the horror in games like Amnesia: The Dark Descent and Alien: Isolation.

== Gameplay ==
The game takes place in a mansion, and focuses on first-person exploration and stealth.

Wraith: The Oblivion – Afterlife is a survival horror video game played with a virtual reality (VR) headset. The game is narrative-driven, and is focused on exploration and stealth in a first-person perspective; although not a focus of the game, it also features combat.

The player takes the role of a wraith, who grows and gains new abilities as they explore the game world, which can be used to interact physically with the environment. Abilities include wraithgrasp, allowing the player to manipulate objects from a distance and to change their environment; sharpened senses, allowing them to hear whispers in the distance and to track other spirits; and insubstantiality, allowing them to walk through walls.

== Synopsis ==
The game is set in the modern Barclay Mansion in the World of Darkness, an urban fantasy setting shared with games including Vampire: The Masquerade and Werewolf: The Apocalypse, where monsters secretly exist within human society. The story follows a recently dead person's spirit in the Shadowlands – a reflection of the land of the living, where the dead exist unseen, side by side with the living – who uncovers mysteries of the afterlife after having died in the mansion, including the reason for their death.

In the beginning of the game, the protagonist awakes without remembering how they died, and is guided into the mansion by their shadow – a sinister voice representing a wraith's self-destructive aspects and dark subconscious. As they explore the mansion, they meet other apparitions and specters.

== Development ==
Afterlife is developed by the Swedish studio Fast Travel Games, and is directed by Erik Odeldahl, designed by Daniel Kihlgren Kallander, and programmed by Casper Renman. It is based on White Wolf Publishing's 1994 tabletop role-playing game Wraith: The Oblivion; and is the first time World of Darkness is adapted as a VR game. It is however still designed to be accessible to players who are new to Wraith: The Oblivion and World of Darkness, intended to be enjoyable by fans of story-driven horror in general and serving as an introduction to the setting.

Odeldahl was influenced by horror games like Amnesia: The Dark Descent (2010) and Alien: Isolation (2014), and felt that their type of horror would work well in a VR game; the developers described the horror design as psychological and "under-your-skin" rather than reliant on jump scares. Odeldahl had wanted to create this in the form of a World of Darkness game, and thought that Wraith: The Oblivion was particularly well suited, due to its mystique and the richness of its setting. The particulars of VR influenced the game's design: whereas other exploration-based games often let the player find and read documents throughout the game world as a way to learn backstory, this would be less doable in a VR game. The developers also found that cinematic cutscenes do not normally work well in VR, and had to find another way of handling them.

Although Paradox Interactive, the owner of the World of Darkness series, were the ones who approached Fast Travel Games about developing a Wraith: The Oblivion game, Odeldahl had thought about adapting Wraith before, and had written a concept document for a Wraith video game adaptation when Fast Travel Games was formed, although Afterlife ended up using a different concept. As he saw Wraith: The Oblivion as being about personal horror, this was also used as the starting point for Afterlife's story, with the game seeking to explore what it means to be human by letting the player take the perspective of a monster. The game is not designed to follow all gameplay rules from the tabletop game, but does use its lore.

The game was announced in June 2020 with a teaser trailer, and was unveiled at Gamescom in August 2020 with a gameplay trailer. The game was released for Oculus Rift and Oculus Quest on April 22, 2021, followed by SteamVR on May 25, 2021, and a PlayStation 4 version for PlayStation VR on October 27, 2021.

== Reception ==
Reception

Aggregate score
| Aggregator | Score |
|---|---|
| Metacritic | 76/100 |

Review score
| Publication | Score |
|---|---|
| IGN | 8.2/10 |

In previews, Destructoid liked the game's concept, hoping that the developers would succeed in realizing it, while Rock, Paper, Shotgun considered it a game of interest for those who can handle horror games in VR. FZ looked forward to the game, calling VR horror an effective concept.

Wraith: The Oblivion – Afterlife received "generally favorable reviews" according to review aggregator Metacritic. UploadVR praised the horror atmosphere of the game's mansion, "Afterlife is clever, opting to take a psychological approach, which admittedly lacks those major frights at times, but Barclay Mansion is a deeply unpleasant setting... Afterlife's builds fear through atmosphere, and it's well-executed". While liking the story, Road to VR criticized the manual checkpoint system as the reviewer felt it hurt the pacing, "I would regularly go out of my way to backtrack to a save point... because I wasn't offered a convenient one in the area. I wished it had a more intelligent checkpoint system so I could focus on objectives and the narrative more clearly".
