= Geist: The Sin-Eaters =

Tabletop role-playing game

- Cover of Geist: The Sin-Eaters
- Designers: Ethan Skemp
- Publishers: White Wolf
- Publication: August 2009
- Genres: Personal horror
- Systems: Storytelling System

Geist: The Sin-Eaters is a tabletop roleplaying game and setting for White Wolf Game Studio's Chronicles of Darkness line released in August 2009. In the setting, a Geist is a spirit bound to a once-dead human resulting in a Sin-Eater.

== Overview ==
=== Premise ===
A Geist is a kind of spirit that was once a ghost but has given up their mortal identity. Instead they have become an embodiment of the ideas and imagery of their own deaths.

Players portray Sin Eaters who have died and returned to the world of the living. Unlike vampires, however, Sin Eaters (also called the Bound) are not undead, but rather living beings bound to fundamental forces of death. Upon the first death, every Sin Eater is approached by a Geist, an embodiment of an aspect or personification of death. In exchange for being returned to life, Sin Eaters allow the Geist to accompany them, effectively merging into each other in a symbiotic relation with the "human" in control. Upon this return to life, the Bound discover that they can see and interact with the restless shades of the dead, and must choose what to do with their second chance at life. In all instances, Sin Eaters are forced to deal with the dead, whether through altruism, greed, or just the plain fact that the dead will not leave them alone.

=== Thresholds ===
Every Sin Eater has a Threshold, relating to the way in which they died. Thresholds can be somewhat fluid, depending on what aspect of death the Sin Eater-to-be focused on at the moment of death. For example, someone who drowns could be either one of the Prey, who are killed by nature, or one of the Silent, who die from deprivation (a lack of oxygen), or even one of the Torn, if they are held under water. There are five Thresholds.

- The Torn: The Torn are called the Bleeding Ones, and the victims of Malice, and they are those who die from violence. Their patron is the Red Horseman, and they are those who are killed by murder or violent means, such as stabbing, shooting, or particularly traumatic and damaging deaths. The Torn often attract angry and vengeful Geists, and they have an affinity for Stigmata and Passion powers.
- The Silent: The Silent are called the Starving Ones, and the victims of Neglect, and they die from deprivation, such as suffocation, starvation, and heartbreak. Their patron is the Black Horseman, and they attract hungry and needy geists. They have an affinity for the powers of the Cold Wind and Stillness.
- The Prey: The Prey are the Eaten and the Drowned, and the victims of the Elements. They are those taken by the wild, from exposure, animal attacks, and drowning. Their patron is the Pale Horseman, and of all the Sin Eaters, their geists are the most elemental and inhuman. They have an affinity for Primeval and Grave-Dirt powers.
- The Stricken: The Stricken are called the Ravaged Ones, and the victims of Plague. They are those who died of disease, illness, or poison. Their patron is the White Horseman, and in defiance of their demise they become very hardy in nature, seeking out challenges to beat. The mementos of this threshold feel unclean or disease ridden. They are affiliated with the powers of the Phantasmal and Tear-Stained Keys.
- The Forgotten: The Forgotten are called the Lightning-Struck, and the victims of Misfortune. They are victims of random chance. Their patron is the Gray Horseman, and they often see the world as random and tend to gamble more because of that. Their mementos feel as if they could kill by accident at any given moment. They possess the powers of the Industrial and Pyre-Flame Keys.

=== Archetypes ===
A sin-eater's archetype refers to their personal views on what has happened to them and how they are going to deal with it.

- Advocate: Advocates are sin-eaters who dedicate their second lives to helping the dead, either out of a sense of obligation or because it will make their dealings with the dead easier.
- Bonepicker: Bonepickers focus on the material comforts they can gain with their powers, and keep good track of what they're owed by whom.
- Celebrant: Celebrants embrace their second life and everything that it has to give, typically as adrenaline junkies or pleasure seekers.
- Gatekeeper: Gatekeepers believe it is their duty to police the boundaries between life and death, standing against ghosts who meddle with the living and the living who meddle with the dead.
- Mourner: Mourners are obsessed with the fact that they died, and they feed off the emotions of those who are in mourning. Some believe they are still dead.
- Necromancer: Necromancers use ghosts and sometimes trips into the Underworld to gain occult lore and knowledge of the past.
- Pilgrim: Pilgrims focus on the spiritual side of death, and try to help people avoid the Underworld by destroying the connections that could form anchors.
- Reaper: Reapers try to make the world a better place, either by murdering the guilty or haunting them until they change their ways.

== Mechanics ==
=== Powerstat: "Psyche" ===
Psyche is the power trait of this venue, and it is a measure of the combined will of the sin-eater and their geist, and the strength of the bond between them. As with other power traits, it can be added to contested rolls against supernatural powers. Psyche is increased by constant work with the dead, resolving fetters, and traveling to the Underworld. High psyche sin-eaters require anchors to tie them into the mortal world, and regular visits to the Underworld to maintain their connection to the dead.

=== Energy: "Plasm" ===
Plasm is what sin-eaters use to fuel their powers. It can be collected at Haunts, cenotes ("low places" with a connection to death, such as a graveyard), and Avernian Gates. It can also be gained by eating the corpus of a ghost, but few sin-eaters will ever resort to this. Death masks are a type of memento that naturally collects Plasm, and wearing one allows the sin-eater to access that plasm. Acting in resonance with one's threshold to the point of jeopardizing one's health or synergy can generate plasm. Finally, releasing a ghost from its anchors and helping it move on will completely refill a sin-eater's plasm bank. The amount of Plasm a sin-eater can hold and spend in a turn is determined by their Psyche rating.

=== Morality: "Synergy" ===
Synergy takes the place of morality for the sin-eater, and measures how well a sin-eater and geist work together. The higher the synergy, the more united the two are in pursuing a goal. This is not always a good thing, as geists don't usually care about right and wrong, so acting in accordance with their wishes may be harmful. In this way, a sin-eater could be a serial killer and still have high synergy. Synergy goes down when a sin-eater causes discord with their geist.

=== Powers: "Keys" ===
Keys are what a sin-eater uses to "unlock" a manifestation. The type of key used determines how the manifestation works. Two sin-eaters using the same manifestation but different keys will have different results. Each key has an associated skill for making activation rolls, though the skill may change depending on which manifestation is used. A sin-eater starts with two keys, one of which must be associated their threshold, and both of which must reflect their death or their geist in some way. More keys may be purchased later with experience points.

- Elemental keys; Associated Skill: Occult. Each elemental key is a separate key that must be purchased alone. Each one is associated with an element combined with death and decay. They are the Cold Wind key, the Grave-dirt key, the Pyre Flame key, and the Tear-stained key. In general, each key can only be used in an elemental environment favorable to it, while using it in an opposing elemental environment is difficult.
- The Industrial Key; Associated Skill: Crafts (Except for use with Oracle manifestation, when it is Investigation). This key grants influence and control over technology and machinery. However, technology that is too new is difficult to influence. This key works best on older or archaic technology.
- The Passion Key; Associated Skill: Empathy (Except when used with Rage manifestation, when it is Intimidation). This key has to do with the influencing, shaping, and control of emotions of people, places or things. Use of this key can, as a side effect, alter the sin-eater's own emotions.
- The Phantasmal Key; Associated Skill: Persuasion (Intimidation when used with Rage, Investigation when used with Oracle). This key lets the sin-eater create illusions. At higher manifestations, they can drive a man mad or kill with it. The side effect of this key is that sin-eater will also experience fleeting hallucinations.
- The Primeval Key; Associated Skill: Animal Ken (Survival when used with Oracle). This key allows a sin-eater to influence or control plants and animals. It also grants control over certain fertility rites and allows the sin-eater to take on animal traits. It causes the sin-eater to become more feral, though they do not lose their ability to think.
- The Stigmata Key; Associated Skill: Occult (Medicine when used with Curse). This key allows the sin-eater to influence or control ghosts or spirits through the use of blood and sacrifice. A sin-eater using this key may choose to take bashing instead of spending plasm, or lethal instead of spending willpower. The damage must be deliberately caused by the sin-eater for this purpose.
- The Stillness Key; Associated Skill: Stealth (Subterfuge in Boneyard, Occult with Marionette, Investigation with Oracle). This key helps the sin-eater in matters of stealth and subterfuge. This key works best when the sin-eater remains still and silent. Most who use this key will even avoid speaking to friends while it's active.
- The Stygian Key; Associated Skill: Medicine. This key give the sin-eater influence or control over death, decay and rot. This key requires that a sacrifice be made before unlocking any manifestation, and can only be learned from a Kerberos after crossing three rivers and drinking from each.

=== Powers: "Manifestations" ===
A sin-eater is able to access their geist's power through manifestations. They are rated 1-5. Each manifestation is associated with a specific attribute. The properties of the manifestation are determined by the key used. The roll to activate is (associated attribute)+(associated skill)+(manifestation rating). Unless otherwise stated, the manifestation lasts for a scene.

- Boneyard; Attribute: Wits. By bleeding plasm into the ground, the sin-eater is granted influence over a large area. The sin-eater's body must remain in a trance-like state while this manifestation is active. While active, a sin-eater can sense any person or thing they wish to find if it is within the boneyard, and affect it with other manifestations. (Note: The Rage manifestation cannot be used in this way.)
- Caul; Attribute: Stamina. The sin-eater allows the geist to merge with their physical body, changing it in a way defined by the Key used to unlock it. All forms of the Caul affect the sin-eater directly, rather than anyone around the sin-eater. The manifestation lasts till the end of the scene, or until the sin-eater dismisses it.
- Curse; Attribute: Presence. This manifestation places a hex on another person, which is carried out by the geist. Typically, only the area around the cursed person is affected, rather than affecting the person directly. The length of the curse is determined by the activation successes. A condition may be placed on the curse's activation, and the cursed person gets an automatic resistance roll.
- Marionette; Attribute: Manipulation. The sin-eater can control people, animals, or objects. The victim retains free will, but cannot control their actions. The nature of the control depends on what key is used. Control typically ends when line of sight is broken, unless used with oracle or boneyard.
- Oracle; Attribute: Intelligence. This manifestation alters a sin-eater's perception, according to the key used to unlock it. Anyone who can see plasmic energy knows a sin-eater who has activated the oracle on sight. In some cases, the astral self leaves the body, while in others, a bonus is added to wits based rolls to perceive anything associated with the key.
- Rage; Attribute: Strength. This is a direct attack on another person by the geist. With a few exceptions, the rage is invisible, though the effects are known by the target and anyone with the ability to see such things (such as mage sight). The range of the rage is 10 yds per dot of Psyche. The level of rage determines what kind of damage is done.
- Shroud; Attribute: Resolve. Plasm envelops the sin-eater, creating a form of armor. The form of the armor depends on the key. It is invisible to the physical, except to those who have supernatural sights. The armor bonus is equal to the shroud rating, and there are special effects added on based on the key.
- Pit; Attribute: Composure. Using the cursed plasm that shapes the Underworld, a sin-eater can remove some aspect of the target, or force some aspect of the world to ignore him. Unlocking this manifestation is a level 7 synergy sin. Also, only Underworld plasm can fuel this ability. If the Sin-eater wants to use an Archetypal manifestation, he must be within one yard of an Avernian Gate.

=== Merit: "Ceremonies" ===
Ceremonies are rituals to achieve specific effects. All ceremonies are extended actions, and all have a target number of successes equal to 2+ ceremony rating, unless otherwise stated. Purchase of this merit, however, is only important at character creation. The number of dots in this merit are equal to the total number of dots for ceremonies a starting character can have. For example, a starting character with 3 dots in the ceremony merit may have one 3-dot ceremony, three 1-dot ceremonies, or one 1-dot and one 2-dot ceremony. After this, ceremonies may be purchased at 2 xp per dot. The number of dots in the ceremony merit does not indicate a cap on how high a level ceremony you may purchase, and the new ceremonies are not treated as an expansion of the merit.

=== Merit: "Haunt" ===
A Haunt is a place with a strong connection to the Underworld. Sin-eaters may use such places to harvest plasm or to open an Avernian Gate. Any place with strong death energy can become a haunt. Haunts have three factors, each of which is treated as a separate merit. Utility is the size, security, accessibility, and mundane usefulness. Fluidity represents how strong the connection to the Underworld is and how easily an Avernian Gate can be opened at the Haunt. A modifier of +1 per dot in fluidity is added to all attempts to open an Avernian Gate at the location. Residue represents how well the Haunt collects plasm. each dot in residue represents a dot of plasm per week. Because of how well connected the haunt is to the Underworld, sleeping in a Haunt will not allow the sin-eater to regain spent Willpower or being well rested due to nightmares.

=== Merit: "Memento" ===
Mementos, also called memento mori, are items that contain a connection to death and act as a focal point of power. All sin-eaters have at least one memento, their keystone, which is given to them by their geist. The Keystone grants access to one threshold and two keys. This memento is free at character creation, and is typically kept in the Twilight. All other mementos must be purchased as separate merits. A memento cannot be improved—it is what it is. There are 5 other kinds of mementos:

- Charms: Level one mementos that grant access to one threshold. The death energy in a charm is unfocused, but use of the "Dedicate charm" ceremony can focus the energy into a Key associated with the charm's threshold. A charm that has been dedicated grants a +1 bonus to all manifestation rolls involving that Key. Having an impressive charm or a large number of charms adds +3 too all social rolls with the Bound.
- Vanitas: Level two mementos that allow the sin-eater to regain spent willpower. The sin-eater must make their own vanitas, and it can be anything they wish it to be. The threshold of a vanitas is the threshold of the sin-eater. Meditating on a vanitas and the nature of their own death allows the sin-eater to regain spent willpower by making a resolve+composure roll. Doing so takes a full scene. Destroying the vanitas of another sin-eater grants full willpower. A sin-eater may only have one vanitas at a time.
- Fetters: Level three mementos that have one threshold and one key. A +2 bonus is given to manifestation rolls using this key. A fetter is created by binding a ghost to its own anchor. The ghost may or may not be pleased with the arrangement. The ghost is no longer able to affect the physical realm or use their numina. However, once per scene, the sin-eater may channel a numen through their own body. Each fetter has only one numen associated with it and the roll is attribute+skill, all of which is determined at the formation of the fetter by the ST.
- Deathmasks: Level four mementos that are the physical remains of a geist. They have one threshold, one key, and one associated skill. They supply a +1 bonus to ceremonies relating to the threshold, a +2 bonus to manifestation rolls using the key, and a +1 bonus to rolls involving the associated skill. In addition, the deathmask retains a memory of the second key, which can be accessed as a manifestation. The deathmask holds 5 plasm, and replenishes spent plasm at the rate of 1 plasm a night. The plasm cannot be drawn into the sin-eater's own reservoir but may be used in place of it. The sin-eater must be wearing the deathmask to access any of the bonuses, and cannot have more deathmasks than half their psyche rating.
- Memorabilia: Level five mementos that are connected to the death of a famous person, and are more powerful charms because of this. They come with a threshold and can be dedicated to a key, granting a +1 bonus to manifestations used with that key. They grant the +3 bonus to social rolls; however, these rolls now have 9 again. If the memorabilia is a piece of equipment, it grants a +5 equipment modifier. If it is not equipment, it has an associated skill to which is grants a +3 bonus if the sin-eater focuses for a round. Using this memento will result in nightmares the following sleep period, and when carried gives a -3 penalty to dealing with regular humans.

== Antagonists ==
=== Ghosts ===
Ghosts are what remains of a person who refused to move on after death because of some unfinished business. If they exist in the mortal realm, then they are found in the Twilight state unless manifesting. These ghosts have anchors which tie them to the mortal realm. An anchor can be any person, place, or thing that held great significance to the ghost in life. A ghost can have many anchors or only one. When the last of these are gone, either from being destroyed or simply disappearing with time, and the ghost has not resolved their unfinished business, they are sent to the Underworld. Sin-eaters can attempt to help a ghost move on, either from the Twilight or from the Underworld, by resolving whatever business the ghost has left. Most ghosts do not understand their own condition, many are far less than coherent, and some simply don't want to move on, so they often try to fight any sin-eaters that are trying to help them.

=== Geists ===
No one is quite certain where geists come from, or what makes a geist, though there are several theories. Many believe that they were ghosts who, having lost all of their anchors and found themselves in the Underworld, latched on to some archetype of death and created an anchor with it. Others believe that they traveled through the Underworld to the Avernian Gates that open into the Shadow, and devoured a spirit. Whatever they are, and wherever they come from, they are most certainly not human anymore. For mechanical purposes, they are treated as a ghost-spirit hybrid. The geist does not control the sin-eater. The geist may tempt, threaten and otherwise attempt to get the sin-eater to go along with its desires, but the choice is ultimately up to the sin-eater. Unfettered geists do not typically present a problem, and most sin-eaters will never deal with them. However, some who have been without a bargain for a long time may become desperate to gain one, and will go to drastic lengths to get one, often leaving a trail of deaths in their wake.

=== The Sacrosanct ===
Take any two krewes (groups of sin-eaters) and you will usually find very different philosophies run each group. Usually krewes stay out of each other's way, except when there are disputes about territory, or when philosophical difference are so great that conflict cannot be avoided. For the most part, however, the krewes are content to ignore each other as long as they keep to their own sides. This is not the case for Sacrosanct. Sacrosanct krewes are fanatical believers, seeing their way as the only way, and viewing other krewes as dangerous cults that must be stopped. They will even hunt down and kill krewes with beliefs similar to their own, because they believe theirs is the true channel, and the other is being influenced by demons in disguise.

=== Abmortals ===
Abmortals can be made from any number of means, most of which are unknown. An abmortal is a person who, either by accident or through some dark ritual, has become immortal and lost its humanity. Most sustain this status by killing others in their place. Some have even been known to make slaves out of the ghosts of their victims. Each abmortal kills its victims in a different way, according to the ritual that grants it immortality. Most abmortals can be killed by interference with their ritual. However, other times a quicker way to deal with the abmortal must be found to stop the deaths. Coming into the world as they do, most abmortals are ignorant of the supernatural world in general.

=== The Wretched ===
The Wretched are sin-eaters who have reached synergy 0. This means that they can no longer work or communicate with their geist. This does not sever the original bargain, however. Wretched end up suffering from a form of multiple personality disorder, as two souls are sharing one body. Eventually, the geist will completely overpower the human soul, gaining full and total control of the body. For obvious reasons, this is a fate to be avoided. Surprisingly enough, most geists wish to avoid this as well, as such a state ultimately fails to last, and the geist will soon have to seek a new merger if it is not destroyed by angry sin-eaters. Synergy can be restored through serious attention by the sin-eater and their krewe or neighboring sin-eaters.

=== The Vacant ===
The Vacant are sin-eaters who have either destroyed their own geist or had their geist destroyed by another. Because of how deep the bond between sin-eater and geist goes, this leaves the sin-eater with a gaping hole in their soul, which they are driven to fill through any means possible. They often try to force unfettered geists (those who are in between mergers) into a bargain. This rarely works out, either because the geist doesn't want anything to do with someone who's already destroyed their geist, or because the synergy of such a bond begins as 0, with little hope for increasing it. Their other method is to attempt to steal a geist from another sin-eater, usually killing them in the process.

=== Kerberoi ===
The Underworld has many layers and dominions, and each of these dominions has a Kerberos attached to it. Kerberoi are the guardians of the Underworld and enforcers of the "old laws", the rules that govern each dominion. Many times, the old laws are hidden, confusing, and arbitrary, meaning that many trips end with fleeing a Kerberos. They often take vaguely humanoid forms, but could never be mistaken for a human. They are extremely powerful, and rarely communicate with sin-eaters except to inform them of a broken law and the penalty for breaking it. Most Kerberoi are hesitant to kill except for the most serious crimes against the laws. Most prefer to give the transgressors a type of quest (Return an object other transgressors have stolen, get information about a certain thing, etc.). It's possible to defeat a Kerberos, but their power is so great that attempts to do so are discouraged.

=== Chthonians ===
Chthonians are strange and alien inhabitants of the Underworld. No one knows where they come from; some think they are ancient ghosts who have lost all vestiges of humanity, some say that they are the result of killing the Kerberoi, and some think they are the ghosts of pre-human races. Chthonians are completely inhuman and hideous. Even their actions seem to only vaguely follow the needs of survival, and their behavior is illogical and unpredictable. It is possible to communicate with a chthonian after they have recently devoured a ghost, but even then the communication is haphazard at best.

== Special: "Symbiology: The effects of being Bound" ==
=== New Life, New Body, New Health ===
- A sin-eater can never be incapacitated or made unconscious from damage. No matter type, source, or how much damage they suffer, the geist will always force them to remain conscious. Wound penalties still apply.
- The blood of a sin-eater has trace amounts of ectoplasm in it. This helps the sin-eater fight off the effects of poison or disease. Add psyche rating to any roll to resist the effects of poison or disease. Note: Only that which is harmful to the sin-eater's health is affected. Alcohol, recreational drugs, and helpful medicines will not activate this defense.
- A sin-eater may spend plasm in a 1:1 ratio to negate damage taken. The type and source of damage are irrelevant. Damage negated in this fashion is marked in the health box as a dot. At the end of the scene all dots are converted to bashing. If new damage is taken before the end of the scene, that damage replaces the dots, rather than moving them down. (Note: This is only if the new damage is not negated in the same fashion.) There cannot be more dots than health boxes. If all health boxes have dots in them, any new damage cannot be negated and replaces the dots.
- If a sin-eater is wounded and has no plasm to spend, they can regain health by "old death" or "new death".
  - "Old Death" is the destruction of a memento. The death energy of a memento is drawn into the sin-eater, restoring health equal to twice the memento's rating. A resolve+occult roll is required. Keystone mementos cannot be destroyed in this fashion.
  - "New Death" is the cold-blooded murder of another person. The death cannot be self-defense or accidental. All health is restored, but the sin-eater automatically loses a point of synergy.
- A geist needs the sin-eater to experience the living world, and does not give them up easily. If a sin-eater dies, the geist will automatically resurrect them on the next sunrise or sunset. The sin-eater automatically loses a point of synergy, and their max synergy goes down by 2. Because someone is supposed to die, in order to create balance Death will take someone else in the sin-eater's place. The sin-eater awakens with the memory of their replacement's last moments. Due to the trauma of the dead's last memory, the sin-eater takes a -2 die penalty to resist derangements due to loss of synergy from being resurrected. A sin-eater who dies of old age cannot be resurrected in this fashion.

=== Dealing with Ghosts ===
- A sin-eater can always see ghosts unless actively trying not to. They can spot a ghostly possession on sight. If a ghost is actively hiding, either by moving behind an object or turning invisible, a Perception roll is required. To shut off this ability, a synergy roll is required. Success means that the Sight is turned off for the scene, unless the sin-eater chooses to turn it back on.
- A sin-eater can always speak to and hear ghosts unless actively trying not to. Language is not a barrier. A synergy roll can shut off this ability.
- While a sin-eater can see and hear ghosts at all times, this does not mean they are seeing the Twilight. In order to interact with the Twilight, a sin-eater can "reverse possess" their geist. This allows them to physically interact with anything in the Twilight. Weapons and objects aside from the Keystone memento do not transfer over. The sin-eater's body still moves according to their actions, which can create interesting problems in a crowded area. Because any weapons used in twilight are in Twilight, a battle with a ghost in Twilight will not harm bystanders in the physical unless they walk into the sin-eater's physical body, or their physical fist. A -3 penalty is added to all rolls to perceive events in the physical world.
- If a ghost uses a numina to affect the living world within 30 yds of the sin-eater, the sin-eater may make a wits+occult+psyche roll to notice, regardless of whether they have deactivated their sight. Likewise, ghosts can always sense a sin-eater and the use of manifestations in range.
- Ghosts are drawn to the death energies within a sin-eater. All ghosts within 10 yds of a sin-eater gain a +1 bonus to manifest, plus one more for each memento the sin-eater is carrying, to a maximum of +5.
- Using a drop of blood and a point of plasm, a sin-eater can re-energize a ghost to being an echo of their former self. This lasts for a scene. Assume that Int= Power.
- As mentioned, a sin-eater can gain plasm by eating the corpus of a ghost. This must be done after the ghost has been defeated, but before the corpus fades away. The ghost must either have been manifested, or the sin-eater must be possessing their geist. The sin-eater is allowed 3 resolve+stamina rolls, and gains 1 plasm per success. This is a synergy 6 sin. This method is avoided by most sin-eaters, partly because the corpus tastes like rotting meat, partly because it makes dealings with ghosts more difficult, but mostly because of the metaphysical implications.
- A sin-eater can eat a geist. This give a -3 penalty to the resolve+stamina rolls. If a sin-eater can accumulate 5 successes, they may purchase their next manifestation for new dots ×5. In order to eat a geist that has bonded to a host, the host must first be killed, then the geist defeated. This is taboo among sin-eaters for obvious reasons.

=== Deathly Knowledge ===
- A sin-eater can tell on sight the exact age of a person, down to the hour. Non-human impostors, such as Vampires, will register the approximate age of the body. Also, with reflexive wits+composure roll, the sin-eater can tell a person's health. Undead such as Vampires register as dead.
- A sin-eater can sense "Death stains": places where people have died. The stain registers as a chill. The more recent or violent the death, the colder the chill is. A wits+psyche roll can determine the age of the stain to the year, month, day, or hour, depending on how old the stain is.
- A sin-eater can make a wits+medicine roll to determine the cause of death of a corpse. The death is felt, not seen, so deaths with little physical sensation induce a -3 penalty. The sin-eater must be touching the corpse or a part of it. Age and amount of corpse are irrelevant.

== Publication history ==
- The Return of Mr. Monster (June 2009) Quickstart Guide, distributed as part of Free RPG Day
- Geist: The Sin-Eaters (August 2009)
- Dem Bones* (PDF Only) (August 2009)
- The House Always Wins* (PDF Only) (August 2009)
- Book of the Dead (October 2009)
- Through the Ebon Gate* (PDF Only) (December 2009)
- Ready-Made Player Characters: The Crossroads Drifters (November 2014)
- Geist: The Sin-Eaters Second Edition (March 2020)
- Memento Mori (April 2020)
- One Foot in the Grave: A Jumpstart for Geist: The Sin-Eaters Second Edition (March 2021)

== Reviews ==
- Black Gate #15 (Spring 2011)
- Realms of Fantasy

== See also ==
- Sin-eater
