= Australian Realms =

- Editor: Corey Swallow
- Categories: Video games
- Frequency: Monthly or bi-monthly
- Publisher: Planar Games
- First issue: 1988
- Final issue: 1996
- Country: Australia
- ISSN: 1031-5241

Australian Realms was an Australian magazine featuring role-playing games (RPGs). Its first issue was published in 1988 by Planar Games at Willetton, Western Australia with Corey Swallow as editor and Mark Hendley as assistant editor.

The publication had the following regular columns: Reviews, Letters, Monster Gallery, and News. Featured articles of the magazine included a spoof comic strip of the Dungeons and Dragons (DnD) games called “The Adventures of the A-Team” as well as a series about the Shadowrun tabletop game and the world of Unae. Notable games also covered were the following: Masque of the Red Death (Ravenloft), The Risen, and The Complete Book of Elves.

Australian Realms contributors included Kyla Ward, Ditmar Award nominees Jason Towers and Kiera McKenzie, Colin Taber, and Ian Cote.

The magazine had 30 issues published either monthly or bi-monthly the last of which was printed in 1996.
