= Wraith: The Oblivion =

1994 tabletop role-playing game by Mark Rein-Hagen

- Second edition cover
- Designers: Mark Rein-Hagen, Sam Chupp, Jennifer Hartshorn
- Publishers: White Wolf Publishing
- Publication: August 18, 1994 (ed. 1); August 8, 1997 (ed. 2); August 8, 2018 (20th Anniversary)
- Genres: Horror
- Systems: Storyteller System
- Series: World of Darkness
- ISBN: 1-56504-133-X (ed. 1): 1-56504-600-5 (ed. 2)

Wraith: The Oblivion is a tabletop role-playing game designed by Mark Rein-Hagen. It is set in the afterlife of White Wolf Publishing's World of Darkness setting, in which the players take on characters who are recently dead and are now ghosts.

Wraith: The Oblivion features a depiction of the afterlife and strong emotional themes, but was the least commercially popular of the World of Darkness games. Both its first edition released in 1994 and second edition in 1997 were the product of White Wolf Publishing. White Wolf discontinued their production of the game line in 1999, leaving some planned material unpublished. In 2018 a 20th Anniversary Edition was released by Onyx Path Publishing.

Following the game's cancellation in 1999, White Wolf revisited some of Wraith's themes in their role-playing miniseries Orpheus. Their 2009 release, Geist: The Sin-Eaters, worked as something of a spiritual successor to Wraith: the Oblivion. In 2011, online role-playing game store DriveThruRPG.com began offering the Wraith: the Oblivion books in a print on demand format through the DriveThruRPG website, making all books available for purchase once again.

== Main concept ==
The game of Wraith: The Oblivion sets the players as characters who have recently died and found themselves within a grim afterlife. Characters have the options of struggling to find a means of ascending into a 'true' afterlife (referred to in the game as Transcendence), becoming embroiled in the politics of the afterlife's denizens, or gradually succumbing to the dreaded Oblivion that seeks to devour all newly deceased souls.

Wraiths draw their strengths from the passions that held them to the living world. In game-terms, each character possesses Fetters, representing an object, place or person which binds them to the world of the living, and Passions, representing an emotion that they have not resolved. Fetters allow a Wraith to remain close to the world of the living, while Passions allow them to gain emotional energy to sustain themselves. However, each Wraith also possesses a secondary personality called a Shadow. Their Shadow, often portrayed by another player, works to assert dominance over the character. The Shadow's motives are always self-destruction of the Wraith. With a mix of emotional fetters and the confrontational play style that the Shadow presents, games of Wraith: The Oblivion are often powerfully emotive.

== Setting ==
Wraith: The Oblivion primarily takes place in the Deadlands of the western world. There are two main regions of the afterlife within the game's setting. The first is referred to as the Shadowlands, which is a darkened reflection of the living world. Wraiths can explore the landscapes and cities as they were during their mortal life, but are unable to interact with it in any meaningful way without the use of special ghostly powers called Arcanoi.

Deeper into the underworld is the Tempest, a perpetually churning chaotic sea of darkness. Within the Tempest are several islands of stable reality, the largest one of which in the western world is the Empire of Stygia (also called the Dark Kingdom of Iron), a massive city-state founded by the legendary Charon. Stygia's authoritarian governing body, The Hierarchy, stands opposed to the disparate Renegades, who challenge its rulership for any number of political reasons, and to the Heretics, cults formed in search of Transcendence (officially proclaimed by the Hierarchy to be neither possible nor desirable). Unaffiliated wraiths are referred to as Freewraiths. The game permits the players to select any of these factions as playable options.

All Wraiths are constantly at risk from Spectres, beings which serve Oblivion and lurk within the seas of the Tempest. Most Spectres are the result of a Shadow taking complete control over a Wraith's personality. They are ruled in sections by ultra-powerful beings known as Malfeans (nightmarish eldritch entities that exist outside of reality). Ferrymen also exist, lone pathfinders who exist above political concern, act as guides through the Tempest and withstand the threat of the Spectres.

Because of the risk of the Spectres, the Hierarchy maintains their own standing army, divided into multiple different Legions based on cause of death. As well as striving to drive back the threat of the Spectres, each Legion's commanding Lord or Lady vies for control over Stygia for their own ends. The slave trade is highly active within the Hierarchy, with many Wraiths bought and sold for trade. Also, as physical objects rarely exist within the afterlife, some unfortunate Wraiths may be subjected to 'Soulforging', a process that renders them into inanimate objects - for example, each coin that exists for trade within Stygia is created from one forged Wraith.

Other Dark Kingdoms also exist in the Tempest, each claiming dominion over the Wraiths of a particular geographical region, such as the Bush of Ghosts, also known as the Dark Kingdom of Ivory, which holds sway over Africa's dead, and the Yellow Springs, also known as the Dark Kingdom of Jade, which rules over the dead of China and surrounding countries.

== System ==
Wraith: The Oblivion uses White Wolf's Storyteller System. As in all Storyteller System games, there are several special rules and systems that support the theme of the game. The most notable are:

Pathos
Pathos is an emotional energy that the Wraith is able to draw from their Passions. They can use this to power their various Arcanoi abilities, to resist their Shadow, and to heal their Corpus.

Corpus (Health)
As the characters are already dead, they do not necessarily sustain physical damage from attacks. Instead, they have a rating score called Corpus which measures their ability to maintain physical integrity. When Corpus falls to zero, a wraith may undergo a Harrowing, a nightmarish psychodrama which pits the wraith against their Shadow in a battle for control.

Arcanoi
Arcanoi, the magical abilities Wraiths can use, are open to most of them, with members of secret groups called Guilds specializing in their use. Although membership within a Guild is outlawed by the oppressive Hierarchy, they still exist in secret and are playable options within the game. The Arcanoi and their respective Guilds are:

- Inhabit: the art of possessing inanimate objects, a skill of the Artificers' Guild.
- Keening: the art of inducing emotion through song, a skill of the Chanteurs' Guild.
- Argos: the art of Underworld travel, especially in the Tempest, a skill of the Harbingers' Guild.
- Pandemonium: the art of causing chaos in the traditional "ghostly" manner, a skill of the Haunters' Guild.
- Moliate: the art of bodily transfiguration (similar to Soulforging), a skill of the Masquers' Guild.
- Lifeweb: the art of manipulating Fetters and their connections to the Wraiths who possess them, a skill of the Monitors' Guild.
- Fatalism: the art of reading a Wraith's past, present, and future, a skill of the Oracles' Guild.
- Castigate: the art of taming the Shadows of other Wraiths, a skill of the Pardoners' Guild.
- Embody: the art of manifesting in the mortal world, a skill of the Proctors' Guild.
- Puppetry: the art of possessing mortals, a skill of the Puppeteers' Guild.
- Phantasm: the art of interacting with the dreams of mortals, a skill of the Sandmen's Guild.
- Outrage: the art of using telekinetic force, usually manifesting as traditional "poltergeist" activity, a skill of the Spooks' Guild.
- Usury: the art of manipulating and drawing on the emotional power of Pathos, a skill of the Usurers' Guild.

Other Arcanoi exist in the possession of minor Guilds and other Dark Kingdoms. Spectres also possess their own Dark Arcanoi in addition to the standard wraithly Arcanoi.

== Release ==
Wraith: The Oblivion was originally published by White Wolf Publishing on August 18, 1994, at the Gen Con gaming convention. They followed it with a second edition two years later on August 8, 1996, also at Gen Con. Onyx Path Publishing, a company formed by ex–White Wolf Publishing staff, financed production of Wraith: The Oblivion 20th Anniversary Edition through a very successful crowdfunding campaign in 2014, and released it on August 8, 2018.

The game has been supported with a line of supplementary game books, which expand the game's mechanics and setting. Among these are the Guildbook series, describing the wraith guilds; books describing locations in the setting; books for various character types; and game guides.

== Reception ==
Adam Tinworth of Arcane gave Wraith: The Oblivion's second edition a score of 9/10, calling it "one of the most mature and involving" role-playing games ever. He appreciated how the gameplay systems work to create a dark atmosphere, how the single-dice-roll action mechanic allowed for degrees of success or failure while remaining simple to use, and how the concept of a player character having a Shadow controlled by another player allowed for players to remain active even when their own character was not the focus of a scene; he did however criticize the combat system rules as confusing, something he called a recurring problem with games using the Storyteller System. He also noted that the game's "horrific" background, and the Shadow system's potential for player abuse, meant that both players and the storyteller would need to put in effort to keep the game from being too depressive and hopeless.

The French release of the first edition did not perform well commercially.

=== Awards ===
- In 1995, Wraith: The Oblivion was nominated for Casus Belli's award for the best role-playing game of 1994, and ended up in seventh place.
- The game was ranked 13th in the 1996 reader poll of Arcane magazine to determine the 50 most popular roleplaying games of all time. The magazine's editor Paul Pettengale commented: "Deep, strange and not exactly cheerful, Wraith is nonetheless an interesting RPG. The game's background provides a setting rich in ideas, and breaks away from many of the traditional ghost stereotypes. Wraith is not a game well suited to casual play, but given a group that's prepared to put some effort in, it can be very challenging." The second edition of the game received Arcane's "seal of approval", and was together with Dragon Storm the magazine's "pick of the month" of August 1996.

== Reviews ==
- Valkyrie #13 (1997)
- Dragon #213 (Jan., 1995)
- Dragão Brasil #3 (1994) (Portuguese)
- Dosdediez (Número 6 - Oct/Nov 1994)
- Rollespilsmagasinet Fønix (Danish) (Issue 3 - July/August 1994)
- Rollespilsmagasinet Fønix (Danish) (Issue 5 - November/December 1994)
- Australian Realms #20

== Related media ==
Wraith: The Oblivion – The Orpheus Device, an audio game developed by Earplay, was published by Paradox Interactive on October 29, 2020, for Android, iOS, and smart speakers. Wraith: The Oblivion – Afterlife, a virtual reality (VR) horror video game was developed by Fast Travel Games and was released in 2021 for Microsoft Windows and PlayStation 4.
