= List of Earthdawn books =

A list of the English-language Earthdawn books with their SKUs. Earthdawn has also had German, French, Japanese and Polish editions.

The first edition of Earthdawn was created and published by FASA Corporation from 1993 to 1999. It was subsequently licensed to three companies, Living Room Games, who published the second edition from 2001 to 2006, and RedBrick, who published a revised first edition called Earthdawn Classic from 2005 to 2008 and a third edition from 2009 until 2012. FASA Games Inc., a wholly owned subsidiary of FASA Corporation, published a fourth edition through Kickstarter in 2013, that was released in 2014. The third company was Vagrant Workshop, who published the Age of Legend edition in 2016.

== FASA releases - first edition ==
- Earthdawn Game System. 6000 (hardcover) / 6001 (softcover)
- Earthdawn Gamemaster Pack (1993). 6002.
- Barsaive (1993)(boxed set). 6100.
- Denizens of Earthdawn, Volume 1. 6101
- Denizens of Earthdawn, Volume 2. 6102
- Legends of Earthdawn, Volume 1. 6103
- Parlainth: The Forgotten City (1994)(boxed set). 6104.
- Creatures of Barsaive. 6105
- The Adept's Way. 6106
- Horrors. 6107
- Sky Point & Vivane (boxed set). 6108
- The Serpent River. 6109
- The Book of Exploration. Legends of Earthdawn, Volume 2. 6110
- Throal: The Dwarf Kingdom. 6111
- Earthdawn Survival Guide. 6112
- The Blood Wood. 6113
- The Theran Empire. 6114
- Secret Societies of Barsaive. 6115
- Crystal Raiders of Barsaive. 6116
- Ork Nation of Cara Fahd. 6117
- Earthdawn Companion (1994). 6200.
- Magic: A Manual of Mystic Secrets (1994). 6201.
- Arcane Mysteries of Barsaive. 6202.
- Mists of Betrayal. 6301
- Terror in the Skies. 6302
- Infected. 6303
- Parlainth Adventures. 6304
- Shattered Pattern. 6305
- Sky Point Adventures. 6306
- Blades. 6307
- Throal Adventures. 6308
- Prelude to War. 6401
- Earthdawn novels (see below).
- Three Promo-Flyers

== Living Room Games releases - first edition ==
- Path of Deception. LRG-100. ISBN 1-55560-450-1
- Barsaive at War. LRG-101. ISBN 0-9704191-0-4

== Living Room Games releases - second edition ==
- Earthdawn Rulebook, Second Edition. LRG-200. ISBN 0-9704191-1-2
- Earthdawn Companion. LRG-201. ISBN 0-9704191-2-0
- Barsaive in Chaos. LRG-202. ISBN 0-9704191-3-9
- The Gamemaster's Screen. LRG-203. ISBN 0-9704191-4-7
- Scourge Unending. LRG ED-204. ISBN 0-9704191-5-5.
- Way of War: Makers of Legend Vol 1. LRG-205. ISBN 0-9704191-7-1
- The Book of Dragons. LRG-206. ISBN 0-9704191-8-X
- The Wanderer’s Way: Makers of Legend Vol. 2. LRG-207. ISBN 0-9755206-3-6
- Dangerous Goods. LRG-208. Unpublished
- Way of Will: Makers of Legend Vol. 3. LRG-209. Unpublished
- Corrupted Lands. LRG-210. Unpublished
- Cities of Barsaive. LRG-211. Unpublished

== RedBrick releases - classic edition ==
- Earthdawn Player's Compendium. RBL-100.
- Earthdawn Gamemaster's Compendium. RBL-101.
- Earthdawn Character Folio. RBL-102.
- Earthdawn Adventure Log. RBL-103.
- Earthdawn Name-giver's Compendium. RBL-200.
- Nations of Barsaive: Volume One. RBL-201
- Kratas: City of Thieves. RBL-202
- Ardanyan's Revenge. RBL-300.
- Earthdawn Adventure Compendium. RBL-301.
- Burning Desires. RBL-302.
- Shards Collection: Volume One. RBL-303.
- Kaer Tardim. RBL-500.
- Character Record Sheets. RBL-501.
- Spell Library. RBL-502.
- Spell Design. RBL-503.
- Discipline Design. RBL-504.
- Barsaive Map. RBL-505.
- Rites of Protection and Passage. RBL-506.
- Kratas Character Codex. RBL-507.
- Journey to Lang: An Earthdawn Shard. RBL-700.
- Runvir's Tomb: An Earthdawn Shard. RBL-701.
- Kept in the Dark: An Earthdawn Shard. RBL-702.
- Pale River: An Earthdawn Shard. RBL-703.
- Tournament Troubles: An Earthdawn Shard. RBL-704.
- Blackout: An Earthdawn Shard. RBL-705.
- Betrayal's Sting: An Earthdawn Shard. RBL-706.
- Westhrall's Passage: An Earthdawn Shard. RBL-707
- A Tear for Jaspree: An Earthdawn Shard. RBL-708
- FASA eBooks.
- Earthdawn novels (see below).

RedBrick also published the following Savage Worlds editions:

- Earthdawn Player's Guide (Savage Worlds Edition) [RB12001], 2012.
- Earthdawn Game Master's Guide (Savage Worlds Edition) [RB12002], 2012.

== RedBrick releases - third edition ==
These third edition releases were published under the Flaming Cobra imprint of Mongoose Publishing.

=== Corebooks ===
- Earthdawn Player's Guide. MGP6141
- Earthdawn Gamemaster's Guide. MGP6142
- Earthdawn Player's Companion. MGP6147
- Earthdawn Gamemaster's Companion. MGP6148
- Misguided Ambitions - An Introduction to Earthdawn.

=== Sourcebooks ===
- Kratas: City of Thieves. MGP6150
- Namegivers of Barsaive. MGP6151
- Nations of Barsaive 1: Throal. MGP6158
- Nations of Barsaive 2: Serpent River. MGP6159
- Nations of Barsaive 3: Cara Fahd. MGP6189
- Nations of Barsaive 4: Crystal Raiders. MGP6198
- Cathay: The Five Kingdoms Player's Guide. MGP 6175
- Cathay: The Five Kingdoms Gamemaster's Guide MGP 6176

=== Adventures ===
- Ardanyan's Revenge. MGP6153
- Shards Collection Volume One. MGP6154
- Shards Collection Volume Two. MGP6166
- Kratas Adventures. MGP6170
- Burning Desires. MGP6191

== RedBrick/FASA Games releases - revised third edition ==
=== Corebooks ===
- Earthdawn Player's Guide. FAS11001P

=== Sourcebooks ===
- Mists of Betrayal. FAS11101P

== FASA Games releases - fourth edition ==
=== Corebooks ===
- Earthdawn Quick Start, FAS14100
- Earthdawn Player's Guide, FAS14101
- Earthdawn Gamemaster's Guide, FAS14102
- Earthdawn Player's Companion, FAS14103
- Earthdawn Game Master's Screen, FAS14104
- Earthdawn Character Journal, FAS14105
- Earthdawn PDF Fillable Form Character Journal, FAS14106

=== Sourcebooks ===
- Travar: The Merchant City, FAS14201
- Elven Nations, FAS14202
- Questors, FAS14203
- The Adept's Journey: Mystic Paths, FAS14204
- Iopos: Lair of Deceit, FAS14205
- Empty Thrones, FAS14206
- Vasgothia, FAS14207
- Grand Bazaar, FAS14208
- Dance with the Serpent, FAS14209

=== Adventures ===
- Legends of Barsaive 00A: Characters, FAS14401
- Legends of Barsaive 00: Haven, FAS14402
- Legends of Barsaive 01: Toys in the Attic, FAS14403
- Legends of Barsaive 02: Lip Service, FAS14404
- Legends of Barsaive 03: Separation Anxiety, FAS14405
- Legends of Barsaive 04: That Which Was Lost, FAS14406
- Legends of Barsaive 05: Games of the Hungry, FAS14407
- Legends of Barsaive 06: Glass Houses, FAS14408
- Legends of Barsaive 07: Heavy Metal Queen, FAS14409
- Legends of Barsaive 08: Brain Scratch, FAS14410
- Legends of Barsaive: Haven Volume 1, FAS14601

== Vagrant Workshop releases - The Age of Legend edition ==
=== Corebook ===
- Earthdawn: The Age of Legend, v20160428

=== Sourcebook and adventures ===
- Darranis: Details the town of Darranis, and provides three adventures in Darranis and its surrounding environs.

== Novels ==
- Christopher Kubasik
  - The Longing Ring, 1993, ISBN 0-451-45277-1
  - Mother Speaks, 1994, ISBN 0-451-45297-6
  - Poisoned Memories, 1994, ISBN 0-451-45329-8
- Sam Lewis (editor), Talisman: A Short Story Anthology, 1994, ISBN 0-451-45389-1
- Carl Sargent & Marc Gascoigne, Shroud of Madness, 1995, ISBN 1-55560-275-4
- Greg Gorden, Prophecy, 1994, ISBN 0-451-45347-6
- Nigel D. Findley, Lost Kaer, 1998 ISBN 1-55560-274-6
- Jak Koke
  - Liferock: A Lost Novel of Earthdawn, 2003, ISBN 0-9745734-1-8
  - Liferock: An Earthdawn Novel, 2010, RedBrick
- Caroline Spector, Immortals trilogy: Since the original Earthdawn novel series was canceled as the books were being written, the first two were first published as French and German translations in the 1990s.
  - Scars: A Lost Novel of Earthdawn, 2005, ISBN 0-9745734-2-6
    Scars: An Earthdawn Novel, 2010, RedBrick
  - Little Treasures
  - Worlds Without End, 1995, ISBN 0-451-45371-9 & 2003, ISBN 0-451-45496-0, as the 18th Shadowrun novel.
- Tim Jones, Anarya's Secret, 2007, RedBrick
- Hank Woon, Cathay:
  - Dark Shadows of Yesterday, 2008, RedBrick
  - Immortal Twilight, 2009, RedBrick
- Donovan Winch, Defiler's Curse, 2011, RedBrick
