= Barsaive Campaign Set =

Tabletop fantasy role-playing game supplement

- Designers: Christopher Kubasik
- Publishers: FASA
- Publication: 1993; 33 years ago
- Genres: Fantasy

Barsaive Campaign Set is a supplement published by FASA in 1993 for the fantasy role-playing game Earthdawn.

== Publication ==
Barsaive Campaign Set, the first major supplement for Earthdawn, was designed by Christopher Kubasik, with contributions from Rob Cruz, Tom Dowd, Sam Lewis, Mike Mulvihill, Diane Piron-Gelman and Louis Prosperi.

== Contents ==
This supplement details the fictional land of Barsaive. It comes as a boxed set that includes

- an Explorer's Guide
- a Gamemaster's Book
- a poster map
- cardstock sheets containing 36 new monster and treasure cards
- a cardboard sextant

Content about the land of Barsaive includes geography; its people, societies and social norms; laws; secret societies; notable personalities; and politics.

== Reception ==
In the May 1994 edition of Dragon (Issue #205), Rick Swan admitted that he hadn't been enamored of Earthdawn when he first reviewed it three issues previously, calling it "a warmed-over version of the AD&D game." But Swan found that the Barsaive supplement successfully moved "the Earthdawn game away from light fantasy and toward [a] sophisticated setting-based approach." Swan concluded, "With the Runequest game on the ropes, the Earthdawn game may be poised to take its place, especially if [FASA] continues with supplements as strong as this."

In the May 1994 edition of Pyramid (Issue #7), Scott Haring gave the game a thumbs up, saying, "This is an excellent game supplement, reasonably priced. For people who play Earthdawn more than once a year or so, it's an absolute must-have. For everybody else, it's just a must-have."

Kevin Montanaro reviewed Barsaive Campaign Set in White Wolf #47 (Sept. 1994), rating it a 4 out of 5 and stated that "Barsaive is an excellent campaign supplement; the map is well designed, the text is plentiful and the information is invaluable."

== Reviews ==
- Valkyrie #1 (Sept. 1994)
- Backstab #5
- Rollespilsmagasinet Fønix (Danish) (Issue 2 - May/June 1994)
- Casus Belli #80
- Australian Realms #16

== See also ==
- Other Earthdawn publications
