= Aysle =

1990 role-playing game supplement

Aysle is a supplement published by West End Games in 1990 for the near-future alternate reality role-playing game Torg.

== Contents ==
Torg is a multi-dimensional role-playing game in which trans-dimensional aliens have invaded Earth, and have divided it up into various alternate realities called "cosms". In essence, this means that the referee can set adventures in almost any genre and time by switching from cosm to cosm. Aysle is a 144-page sourcebook that defines a heroic fantasy world setting for Torg, a cosm that has been laid over the United Kingdom and Scandinavia by the alien House Daleron.

=== Geography ===
The world of Aysle has the shape of a torus (a doughnut). The sun rises up and down through the central hole of the torus, meaning that the seas closest to the hole are boiling, while those at the edge of the torus are frozen. Both sides of the torus have continents and populations. Below the surface is where dwarves dwell.

=== Magic ===
The basic magic system of the game was described in Torg. This book delves into the magic system in much more detail and also lists a large number of spells for advanced characters.

In Aylse, all people have magical abilities, which are determined by the stars at their birth. Magic is at the heart of the economy, with the standard "coin" being a 1-hour conjuration spell.

=== Missions ===
Several short adventures or missions are outlined for the referee to use.

== Reception ==
In the May 1991 edition of Dragon (Issue 169), Ken Rolston questioned whether the magic system would work well, saying, "The presentation is so abstract and wordy that I have a hard time figuring out what part is rules and what part is just gas... The only folks who’ll ever find out whether the system works will have put a lot more work into the process than most of us are willing to expend." Rolston also found the adventures published for the Aysle setting to be "dull and uninspiring... These anthologies of two- or three-page adventure outlines don't bring much drama or tone to a setting." Overall, despite its problems, Rolston concluded that "This campaign is satisfactory, perhaps even superior, as a heroic fantasy setting."

== Reviews ==
- Casus Belli #71 (Sep 1992)

== See also ==
- The Storm Knights' Guide to the Possibility Wars
- The Land Below
- Kanawa Heavy Weapons
- Creatures of Aysle
