= City of Demons (Torg) =

City of Demons is a 1992 role-playing adventure for Torg published by West End Games.

== Plot summary ==
City of Demons is an adventure in which Los Angeles is occupied by Tharkold, and the player characters must ally with the regent of Orrorsh.

== Reception ==
S. John Ross reviewed City of Demons in White Wolf #32 (July/Aug., 1992), rating it a 3 out of 5 and stated that "The adventure is a series of interesting fight scenes and generally dramatic roleplaying encounters that build toward a fantastic climax. However, just at the climactic scene, the adventure switches from a dramatic narrative and becomes almost a simplistic boardgame as the actual 'race' commences."
