= Sky Point Adventures =

Fantasy role-playing adventure for Earthdawn RPG

- Cover art by Doug Andersen
- Designers: Carl Sargent; Teeuwynn Woodruff; Chris McCubbin
- Illustrators: Doug Andersen; Joel Biske; Kent Burles; Larry MacDougall
- Publishers: FASA
- Publication: 1995
- Genres: Fantasy

Sky Point Adventures is a collection of three adventures published by FASA in 1995 for the fantasy role-playing game Earthdawn that introduces players to the fortress of Sky Point and its environs.

== Contents ==
Sky Point and the nearby city of Vivane, both described in a previous FASA publication, Sky Point & Vivane, are the only parts of Barsaive that are still under the thumb of the evil Theran Empire. Three short adventures, designed for parties of about six players, introduce the players to those locations:

1. "Chasing the Snakeskin Boots": In the city of Vivane, the characters must retrieve an object stolen by a thief who has fled to a still-ruined sector of the city. It is an opportunity to explore some of the more clandestine parts of the city and its society. For second- and third-tier characters.
2. "A Message to Vivane": The adventurers are hired to courier an important scroll past Theran guards into the city of Vivane, but must recover it without alerting Theran authorities when it falls into the wrong hands. For third-tier characters.
3. "Shadows": The adventurers must help an old friend rescue his son, who is being held by slavers in Vrontok, "a wretched sprawl of ramshackle wharves, scruffy drinking dens, and diseased slaveyards" that lies at the foot of the Sky Point fortress. For third-and fourth-tier characters.

== Publication history ==
FASA published the fantasy role-playing game Earthdawn in 1993, and produced many adventures and supplements for it over the next five years. Three collections of short adventures — Parlainth Adventures (1994), Sky Point Adventures (1995), and Throal Adventures (1996) — were designed to introduce players to various locations in the province of Barsaive. Sky Point Adventures, an 80-page softcover book with cover art by Doug Andersen, interior art by Joel Biske, Kent Burles, and Larry MacDougall, and cartography by Aldo Pinkster, was designed by Carl Sargent, Teeuwynn Woodruff, and Chris McCubbin.

== Reception ==
In Issue 3 of the British game magazine Arcane , Andy Butcher called the first scenario "a simple, linear story, consisting of little more than a linked series of encounters that can be finished in a single session quite easily." Butcher found the second scenario was more interesting, noting, "some degree of thought and diplomacy will be required for players to reach the end of this story with their characters' hides intact." Butcher thought the third scenario was "perhaps the most interesting of the adventures in the book, but still suffers from being a little too rigid in its plotting." Butcher concluded by giving the book a rating of 8 out of 10, saying, "In all, Sky Point Adventures is a fairly even mix of good and bad. There are some great adventure ideas here, but to do them justice will require a fair amount of work from the referee."

In Issue 225 of Dragon (January 1996), Rick Swan called this book "a collection of terrific scenarios." Swan thought that the third scenario was the best, noting that it "centers on a fiendish wizard and a den of creepy arachnids." Swan concluded, "Nothing revolutionary here, just frisky, inventive fantasy."
