= Earthdawn Survival Guide =

Tabletop fantasy role-playing game supplement

- Cover art by John Howe
- Designers: Robin D. Laws
- Publishers: FASA
- Publication: 1996; 30 years ago
- Genres: Fantasy

Earthdawn Survival Guide is a supplement published by FASA in 1996 for the fantasy role-playing game Earthdawn.

== Contents ==
Earthdawn Survival Guide is a 184-page softcover book designed by Robin D. Laws, with illustrations by Janet Aulisio, Tom Baxa, Joel Biske, Kent Burles, Liz Danforth, Jeff Laubenstein, and Larry MacDougal, with cover art by John Howe. Through a series of essays purportedly written by residents of the world of Earthdawn, the book provides details on adventuring in Barsaive. Topics covered include

- the hazards of
  - travel in general
  - the Wilds (mountains, jungles, forests and ruins)
  - underground exploration
  - places of legend and peril (the Badlands, Death's Sea, the Mist Swamps, the Wastes)
- healing and injury, including herbs, poisons and disease

== Reception ==
In the March 1997 edition of Arcane, Andy Butcher thought that "Referees running a heroic, high fantasy game where the emphasis is on adventure and cinematic action may find their games will become bogged down in the detail presented here." On the other hand, Butcher thought the book could be "a valuable resource" for "a gritty, nastier style of game that pays more attention to the hazards of life in a fantasy world." He concluded by giving the book a below average rating of 6 out of 10.

In the December 1997 edition of Dragon (Issue #242), Rick Swan enjoyed the essay-style design of the book, saying, "the whimsical writing style makes it as inviting as a book of fairy tales. [...] Kinda makes you want to curl up in a chair with a cup of hot chocolate." Swan liked the fact that all of the game mechanics were moved to the end of the book, "meaning you can peruse most of the book without stumbling over a single number." However, he criticized the lack of reference points: "Without an index or a comprehensive table of contents, it’s difficult to locate specifics; the only way to find, say, data about explosive gas is to page through the book." He also noted that despite detailing many different places, the book did not contain a single map. He also questioned the high price of the book, at $18. He concluded by giving the book an average rating of 4 out of 6, commenting that the generic nature of the information in the book could be a source of ideas for gamemasters running other fantasy role-playing games such as AD&D.

== Reviews ==
- Valkyrie #14 (1997)
- Shadis #35 (1997)
- Casus Belli #102

== See also ==
- Other Earthdawn publications
