= Arcane Mysteries of Barsaive =

- Series: Earthdawn
- Publisher: FASA
- Publication date: 1997

Arcane Mysteries of Barsaive is a 1997 role-playing game supplement published by FASA for Earthdawn.

== Contents ==
Arcane Mysteries of Barsaive is a supplement in which magic is expanded extensively, as a companion to Magic: A Manual of Mystic Secrets. Organized into three distinct sections—Spells, Talent Knacks, and Magical Items—it delivers an array of options for players. The Spells section introduces over 200 new enchantments distributed among the four Disciplines: Elementalist, Illusionist, Nethermancer, and Wizard. Notably, it includes the first officially published spells of Circle 13 and beyond, along with enhancements to the concept of Named Spells. Talent Knacks receive a major expansion. With more than 70 new Knacks, players can improve their existing Talents to yield new effects—from Matched Weapons for dual-wielding adepts to By the Fingernails, offering Scouts a desperate last grab in failed climbs. The book also outlines custom Knack creation. The section on Magical Items offers a wide range of additions, from minor comfort-enhancing charms like temperature-regulating bedrolls to formidable artifacts such as the sword Truefang.

== Reception ==
Andy Butcher reviewed Arcane Mysteries of Barsaive for Arcane magazine, rating it a 6 out of 10 overall, and stated that "If you really feel that your Earthdawn campaign would benefit from several hundred new magical bits and pieces – perhaps your group is particularly experienced and looking for new toys, for example – then I'd recommend this very highly indeed. On the other hand, new gaming groups, or those wanting to keep things a little simpler, can safely do without it."

== Reviews ==
- Valkyrie #14 (1997)
- Casus Belli #105
