= Parlainth: The Forgotten City =

1994 tabletop fantasy role-playing game supplement

Parlainth
The Forgotten City
- Designers: Shane Lacy Hensley; Robin D. Laws; John Terra
- Publishers: FASA
- Publication: 1994; 32 years ago
- Genres: Fantasy

Parlainth: The Forgotten City is a 1994 role-playing game supplement published by FASA for Earthdawn.

== Contents ==
Written by Shane Lacy Hensley, Robin D. Laws, John Terra, Parlainth: The Forgotten City is a supplement detailing the ruined city of Parlainth.

== Reviews ==
- Dragon #216 (April 1995)
- Black Gate
- Backstab #12
- Valkyrie (Volume 1, Issue 4 - Dec 1994)
- Casus Belli (Issue 84 - Dec 1994)
- Australian Realms #21
- Rollespilsmagasinet Fønix (Issue 6 - January/February 1995)

== See also ==
- Other Earthdawn publications
