= Earthdawn Gamemaster Pack =

Tabletop fantasy role-playing game supplement

- Designers: Greg Gorden; Louis Prosperi
- Publishers: FASA
- Publication: 1993; 33 years ago
- Genres: Fantasy

Earthdawn Gamemaster Pack is a supplement published by FASA in 1993 for the fantasy role-playing game Earthdawn.

== Contents ==
Earthdawn Gamemaster Pack contains:

- a 64-page booklet designed by Greg Gorden and Louis Prosperi, with illustrations by Jennell Jaquays (Note: Credited as Paul Jaquays.), Jeff Laubenstein, Joel Biske, and Robert Nelson, that contains rules for non-player characters, tips for designing adventures, optional combat rules, new treasures, and an essay about blood magic.
- a gamemaster's screen
- nine new treasure cards
- errata from the main Earthdawn rulebook

== Reception ==
In the February 1994 edition of Dragon (Issue #202), Rick Swan was unimpressed by this supplement. He felt that the gamemaster's screen "does an adequate job collecting key tables from the rulebook, but in itself isn't worth the price of the package." Likewise, Swan didn't feel the information contained in the booklet was crucial, and thought that the errata sheet only contained one worthwhile correction.

Kevin Montanaro reviewed Earthdawn Gamemaster Pack in White Wolf #42 (April, 1994), rating it a 4.5 out of 5 and stated that "All material is useful and plentiful. The booklet is rather thick in comparison to similar products; the screen is of good quality and there are additions that spill out upon opening. As far as screen packs go, this is a good buy."

== Reviews ==
- Australian Realms #15

== See also ==
- Other Earthdawn publications
