= Horror =

Horror may refer to:

== Arts, entertainment, and media ==
=== Genres ===
- Horror fiction, a genre of fiction
  - Psychological horror, a subgenre of horror fiction
  - Christmas horror, a subgenre of horror fiction
  - Analog horror, a subgenre of horror fiction
  - Erotic horror, a subgenre of horror fiction
  - Space horror, a subgenre of horror fiction
  - Folk horror, a subgenre of horror fiction
  - Japanese horror, Japanese horror fiction
  - Korean horror, Korean horror fiction
- Horror film, a film genre
  - Art horror, a subgenre of horror film
  - Body horror, a subgenre of horror film
  - Comedy horror, a subgenre of horror film
  - Erotic horror film, a subgenre of horror film
  - Slasher film, a subgenre of horror film
  - Splatter film, a subgenre of horror film
  - Supernatural horror film, a subgenre of horror film
  - Psychological horror film, a subgenre of horror film
  - Postmodern horror, a subgenre of horror film
  - Indonesian horror, Indonesian horror film
  - Thai horror, Thai horror film
- Horror comics, comic books focusing on horror
- Horror punk, a music genre
- Horrorcore, a subgenre of hip hop music based on horror
- Horror game, a video game genre
  - Survival horror, a video game subgenre of horror and action-adventure
- Horror podcast, a podcast genre

=== Films ===
- Horror (2002 film), an American film by Dante Tomaselli
- #Horror, a 2015 American film by Tara Subkoff
- Horror, Italian title for the 1963 Italian-Spanish film The Blancheville Monster

=== Fictional characters ===
- Horror (Garo), fictional monsters in the tokusatsu series Garo

=== Music ===
==== Groups and labels ====
- Ho99o9 (pronounced Horror), an American hip hop group
- The Horrors, an English rock band

==== Albums and EPs ====
- Horror (Cannae album), 2003
- Horror (With Blood Comes Cleansing album), 2008
- The Horror, a 2003 album by RJD2
- The Horrors (EP), 2006 EP by the Horrors
- Horror, a 2019 album by Exhumed

=== Other arts, entertainment, and media ===
- Horror and terror, two concepts in Gothic literature and film
- Horror Channel, a former name of the British television channel Legend
- Horrors (Earthdawn), a 1995 supplement for role-playing game Earthdawn
- "The horror! The horror!", a line uttered by Kurtz in Joseph Conrad's 1899 novella Heart of Darkness and its 1979 film adaptation Apocalypse Now

== Other uses ==
- "The horrors", a nickname for delirium tremens, or, acute delirium caused by alcohol withdrawal

== See also ==
- Horror vacui (disambiguation)
