= Legends of Earthdawn, Volume Two: The Book of Exploration =

Tabletop fantasy role-playing game supplement

The Book of Exploration
- Designers: Diane Piron-Gelman; Greg Gorden; David R. Henry; Angel Leigh McCoy; Jim Nelson; Andrew Ragland; Rich Warren
- Publishers: FASA
- Publication: 1996; 30 years ago
- Genres: Fantasy

The Book of Exploration is a supplement published by FASA in 1996 for the fantasy role-playing game Earthdawn.

== Contents ==
The Book of Exploration presents over twenty stories involving maps, clues, descriptions of monsters, myths and legends. These stories are designed to be of inspiration to referees looking for ideas for their Earthdawn campaign. The second half of the book analyses each story, with specific suggestions on how it could be turned into an adventure.

== Publication history ==
The Book of Exploration, the second volume in the Earthdawn Legends series, was written by Diane Piron-Gelman, Greg Gorden, David R. Henry, Angel Leigh McCoy, Jim Nelson, Andrew Ragland, and Rich Warren.

== Reception ==
In the July 1996 edition of Arcane (Issue 8), Andy Butcher gave this volume a below average rating of only 5 out of 10, saying that it suffered from the same problem as the first volume of Earthdawn legends: "There are a lot of good ideas here, but even the best of them require work to turn into something useful. If you're completely stumped for inspiration, or need a plot quickly for some reason, then this may be of use. Otherwise, steer clear."

In the November 1996 edition of Dragon (Issue 235), Rick Swan called the stories "well-written and tightly edited, they go down as easy as potato chips." However, he questioned why the stories were released as a relatively expensive ($10 in 1996) large format softcover, saying, "This is essentially a collection of short stories. So why not publish it as a paperback book and knock the price down a few bucks?"

== Reviews ==
- Envoyer #49
- Australian Realms #29

== See also ==
- Other Earthdawn publications
