= The Nile Empire =

Cross-genre tabletop role-playing game supplement

- Cover art by Daniel Horne, 1990
- Designers: Ray Winninger
- Publishers: West End Games; Ulisses Spiele
- Publication: 1990 1st edition WEG; 2020 2nd edition Ulisses Spiele
- Genres: cross-genre
- Systems: TORG

Cover of Torg Eternity edition, 2020

The Nile Empire is a supplement published by West End Games in 1990 for the cross-genre role-playing game Torg. A second edition was published for the Torg Eternity role-playing game in 2020.

== Description ==
Earth has been invaded by the High Lords, alien beings who have imposed different realities, called "cosms", on various parts of Earth. One of the aliens, styling itself Pharaoh Mobius, has imposed a reality of 1930s pulp fiction across Africa. In this reality, a new Nile Empire has arisen, armed with 1930s technology, magical astronomy and "weird science" powers and gizmos. The player characters are Storm Knights, who must enter the reality of the cosm to thwart the plans of the evil Pharaoh Mobius in the hopes of sending him back to his own alien plane.

This book details the cosm, the history of Pharaoh Mobius, how the empire is structured, the various cities, and several areas to be explored. The book also outlines new rules for this cosm, as well as new skills, powers, devices, magic, miracles, creatures and equipment. Each city and area has adventure hooks that the gamemaster can use.

== Publication history ==
West End Games originally published the cross-genre role-playing game Torg in 1990, and quickly followed up the same year with The Nile Empire, a 126-page softcover paperback written by Ray Winninger with additional material by Greg Farshtey and Michael Stern, interior illustrations by Bob Dvorak, Link Mahone, Francis Mao, Allen Nunis, Dan Panosian, and Tim Wright, and cover art by Daniel Horne.

Thirty years later, in 2020, Ulisses Spiele published an 80-page hardcover revision for the Torg Eternity rules that included ten adventures written by Greg Gorden, Miranda Horner, Steve Kenson, Wendy Reischl, Bill Slavicsek, Ed Stark, John Terra, Tracy Sizemore, John Wick, Scott Alan Woodard, and Camdon Wright, with art by Ben Acevedo, Emma Beltran, Chris Bivins, and Donald Crank.

== Reception ==
Stewart Wieck reviewed the product in the October–November 1990 issue of White Wolf. He praised the product's quality and informative value, stating that, "If you play Torg, then this product is a must have." He rated it a 4 of 5 possible points.

In the February 1991 edition of Dragon (Issue #166), Jim Bambra thought that "Fans of pulp adventure and the Indiana Jones movies will find this supplement very much to their tastes [...] Characters can wander the streets of Cairo or enter the surrounding deserts, seeking to thwart the schemes of Dr. Mobius and his unscrupulous henchmen."
