= Infiniverse Campaign Game Update Volume I =

Infiniverse Campaign Game Update Volume I is a 1992 role-playing supplement for Torg published by West End Games.

== Contents ==
Infiniverse Campaign Game Update Volume I is a supplement in which spells, adventures and additional material are collected.

== Reception ==
S. John Ross reviewed Infiniverse Campaign Game Update (Volume 1) in White Wolf #34 (Jan./Feb., 1993), rating it a 4 out of 5 and stated that "It's an exhausting eyeful, and bound to be useful to any TORG play group. I recommend it."
