= Digital Burn =

Digital Burn is a 2002 role-playing game supplement published by Living Room Games for d20 Modern.

== Contents ==
Digital Burn is a supplement in which a cyberpunk setting is presented.

== Reviews ==
- Pyramid
- Backstab
- The Gaming Herald (Vol 1, No 0 - Aug 2002)
