= Kanawa Heavy Weapons =

Kanawa Heavy Weapons is a 1991 role-playing supplement for Torg published by West End Games.

== Contents ==
Kanawa Heavy Weapons is a supplement in which weapons are detailed with illustrations and game statistics.

== Reception ==
S. John Ross reviewed Kanawa Heavy Weapons Catalog in White Wolf #31 (May/June, 1992), rating it a 1 out of 5 and stated that "So, you have all of the graphic problems of the previous catalog, compounded with the fact that the weapons are almost useless to the average group of Storm Knights. Unless your campaign focuses on the hard-core military aspects of the Possibility Wars, you will find this book to be so much wasted paper. And even if you ARE fond of military hardware, you could do much better than this book."
