= Tharkold =

Cross-genre tabletop role-playing game supplement

- Publishers: West End Games
- Publication: 1992
- Genres: cross-genre
- Systems: TORG

Tharkold is a 1992 role-playing supplement for Torg published by West End Games.

== Contents ==
Tharkold is a supplement in which the Tharkold realm built from occupied Los Angeles is detailed.

== Reception ==
S. John Ross reviewed Tharkold in White Wolf #32 (July/Aug., 1992), rating it a 4 out of 5 and stated that "The book, while very long, is a good read nonetheless. The writing is a step above previous Torg sourcebooks, and both the atmosphere and humor have a mark of intelligence that other Torg products have sometimes lacked."

== Reviews ==
- Saga (Issue 16 - Sep 1992)
- Challenge (Issue 66)
- Windgeflüster (Issue 20 - Nov 1992)
- Dragon (Issue 184 - Aug 1992)
