= Risus =

Role-playing game

Risus: The Anything RPG is a rules-light generic role-playing game (RPG) written, designed and illustrated by S. John Ross of Cumberland Games & Diversions. Risus is available free on the web. It was first published online in 1993. Earlier versions of the game were titled GUCS: The Generic Universal Comedy System (a parody of GURPS) and were distributed privately beginning in 1989.

== History ==
Risus (Latin for “laughter”) is a comedy game (often described by its creator as a "joke game") and uses a cliché (character class) system inspired by the broad "career scale" skills in Greg Gorden's DC Heroes RPG (Mayfair Games), and later influenced by Atlas Games' Over the Edge. The core systems of Risus owe their largest debt to the Ghostbusters RPG published by West End Games, and to Tunnels and Trolls by Ken St. Andre. The game itself also cites GURPS as an influence, along with FUDGE, another free RPG released to the web a year earlier. Several more recent games have been, in turn, influenced by Risus.

Despite the game's small size and admittedly joking nature, there are more than 30 fan-authored websites devoted to Risus, some including several rules variants, simple worldbooks, and wholly rewritten adaptations of the game. Risus itself has been translated into Chinese, Croatian, Czech, Danish, Dutch, Esperanto, French, German, Italian, Japanese, Korean, Norwegian, Polish, Portuguese, Russian, and Spanish. In December, 2003, Cumberland Games began to support the free game with commercial supplements, beginning with the Risus Companion and the founding of the International Order of Risus. An example of another commercial product is A Kringle in Time, "an adventure about saving Christmas from ancient evil."

New Risus won the 2001 inaugural RPGnet award for Best Free RPG.

== Risus Companion ==
The Risus Companion is the first commercial supplement of Risus. S. John Ross wrote and published the Risus Companion on the 10th anniversary of Risus on the World Wide Web, in order to provide a foundation for Risus as a commercial venture. Risus itself remains free of charge, allowing Risus fans the option to support Risus if they choose and be materially rewarded for doing so. The Risus Companion is an electronic document in PDF form, made available to all members of the International Order of Risus.

== Reception ==
In a review of Risus in Black Gate, Ryan Harvey said "I can enthusiastically recommend Risus to anybody with an imagination, regardless of his or her experience with those funny-sided dice. Not only are the rules so slim that they fit onto six pages (with two dedicated to optional rules), but the system runs entirely on clichés that any one who has seen a movie, read a book, or gotten around more than St. Symeon the Stylite, will recognize and know how to act out."
