= The Living Land =

Cross-genre tabletop role-playing game supplement

The Sourcebook of Primitive Reality
- 1st edition cover by Daniel Horne
- Designers: Christopher Kubasik
- Publishers: West End Games; Ulisses Spiele
- Publication: 1990 1st edition WEG; 2018 2nd edition Ulisses Spiele
- Genres: cross-genre
- Systems: TORG
- ISBN: 9780874313048

2nd edition cover by Gunship Revolution

The Living Land is a cross-genre tabletop role-playing supplement, written by Christopher Kubasik, with cover art by Daniel Horne and interior illustrations by Jeff Menges, and published by West End Games in 1990. The first sourcebook published for Torg, detailing the mist-filled jungle and its primitive dinosaur people that had invaded two areas of North America. It received mixed reviews in game periodicals including Games International, White Wolf, and Dragon. A rewritten version was published in 2018 by Ulisses Spiele for Torg Eternity.

== Contents ==
In 1990, West End Games released Torg, a game in which aliens had overlaid a psychic landscape on various areas of the Earth, forcing reality to change to their whims. The Living Land, published the same year, was the first supplement, and describes the prehistoric realm that the alien overlord Baruk Kaah has laid over the reality of the east and west coasts of North America. The result is a world of dinosaurs versus humanity where some Americans have reverted to primitive savagery, and others have resisted. The setting reminded reviewer Paul Mason of Arthur Conan Doyle's The Lost World or Edgar Rice Burrough's Pellucidar.

The second half of the book explains rules for dealing with the lack of technology, and lists adventure ideas and new character templates.

== Publication history ==
Originally published in 1990 by West End Games as a 128-page book, it was rewritten in 2018 by Ulisses Spiele for Torg Eternity, after a Kickstarter. It was developed into a series of products:

- UNA10020 - The Living Land (Sourcebook), 2018
- UNA10021 - The Living Land GM Screen and Archetypes, 2018
- UNA10022 - The God Box (A Living Land Campaign), 2018
- UNA10024 - Delphi Missions - Living Land (11 Living Land adventures), 2018
- UNA10025 - The Living Land Threat Blips & Cards (GM accessories), 2018
- UNA10026 - The Living Land Map Pack 1, 2018
- UNA10027 - The God Box Soundtrack (background music for The God Box), 2018
- UNA10028 - The Living Land Map Pack 2, 2018

== Reception ==
In the July 1990 edition of Games International (Issue No. 16), Paul Mason called the tone of this supplement "too relentlessly pulpish to allow for subtle characterisation."

Stewart Wieck reviewed the product in the August–September 1990 issue of White Wolf (Issue No. 22). He stated that he "found this product to be entirely lackluster", rating it a total of 2 out of 5 possible points. He thought that chapter 8 on character interactions was most useful.

In the February 1991 edition of Dragon (Issue No. 166), Jim Bambra was ambivalent about this product, saying, "Although well written, the setting comes across as a limited one. After getting lost in the deep mist of the Living Land a few times and fighting rampaging lizardmen, its possibilities for adventure come across as fairly narrow."
