= Central Valley Gate =

Central Valley Gate is a 1992 role-playing adventure for Torg published by West End Games.

== Plot summary ==
Central Valley Gate is an adventure in which the player characters are in the isolated California small town Redside.

== Reception ==
S. John Ross reviewed Central Valley Gate in White Wolf #33 (Sept./Oct., 1992), rating it a 3 out of 5 and stated that "Despite a few annoyingly gratuitous hedge scenes, and a heavy focus on combat, Central Valley Gate is a good mystery scenario, and the Orrorshan horror element has a lot of surprise potential if your group is used to Core Earth and the Living Land. While it's not the best of the TORG adventures I've read, it's bound to be worth a few entertaining evenings."
