= The Serpent River =

Tabletop fantasy role-playing game supplement

- Publishers: FASA
- Publication: 1996; 30 years ago
- Genres: Fantasy

The Serpent River is a 1996 supplement published by FASA for their Earthdawn fantasy role-playing game.

== Contents ==
The Serpent River is a supplement in which an expansive and detailed guide is offered to the pivotal waterway through Barsaive's landscape. At over 2,000 miles long, the Serpent River serves not just as a trade route, but is integral to the region's commerce, politics, and intrigue—especially among the influential t'skrang trading houses. Rather than a mere passage between destinations, the river becomes the setting for campaigns full of conflict and exploration. The book is divided into sections covering the South Reach, Coil River, Mid Reach, and North Reach, each with its own distinctive trading houses, communities, and notable figures. Legends, myths, and regional customs offer gamemasters material for faction-driven storytelling or local color. Political maneuvering and economic rivalries offer schemes, while traditional adventuring opportunities remain abundant. The latter chapters shift focus to mechanical support: stats and descriptions for common river vessels, a streamlined system for naval combat, over 20 unique creatures—including exotic flora—and a catalog of magical treasures that can be discovered or purchased along the river's course.

== Reception ==
Andy Butcher reviewed The Serpent River for Arcane magazine, rating it an 8 out of 10 overall, and stated that "The Serpent River is a good, solid sourcebook for Earthdawn which is packed from cover to cover with plenty of information, bright ideas and inspiration. It's largely well written, easy to read and well illustrated. Most importantly, the great majority of the book is of direct use to the referee, rather than simply being interesting fluff to pad out the background of the game. Referees with business-minded players will find it of particular use, because an interesting campaign could be built around an independent merchant vessel which is plying its trade along the river."

== Reviews ==
- Dragon (German Issue 9 - Jul/Aug 2000)
- Magia i Miecz (Issue 88 - Apr 2001)
- Australian Realms #29
- Envoyer

== See also ==
- Other Earthdawn publications
