= Creatures of Barsaive =

Tabletop fantasy role-playing game supplement

Denizens of Earthdawn
- Designers: Fraser Cain
- Publishers: FASA
- Publication: 1994; 32 years ago
- Genres: Fantasy

Creatures of Barsaive is a supplement published by FASA in 1994 for the fantasy role-playing game Earthdawn.

== Contents ==
Creatures of Barsaive, by Fraser Cain, is a bestiary describing fifty more creatures found in Barsaive. The information is provided by the great dragon Vasdenjas, who is dictating his reminiscences to a dwarven scribe.

Some of the creatures are original creations, some are more traditional creatures that are given a background suited to the Earthdawn setting.

== Reception ==
In the July 1995 edition of Dragon (Issue #219), Allen Varney noted that like other Earthdawn supplements, this book "takes a creative approach to its well-worn subject." Varney thought using a dragon's point-of-view "reveals much about draconic psychology, and his dialogues with the scribe make the text a delight to read."

== Reviews ==
- Rollespilsmagasinet Fønix (Danish) (Issue 8 - May/June 1995)
- Świat Gier Komputerowych #107

== See also ==
- Other Earthdawn publications
