= Prelude to War (Earthdawn) =

- Editor: Dave Renton
- Publisher: FASA
- Publication date: 1996

Prelude to War is a 1996 role-playing game supplement published by FASA for Earthdawn.

== Contents ==
Prelude to War is a supplement in which the rising tensions between Barsaive and the Theran Empire, Barsaive's former ruler, set the stage for imminent war. Structured into four detailed mini-campaigns, the book immerses players in the unfolding crisis: "The Theran Behemoth" heralds conflict with the arrival of a massive Theran airship; "The King is Dead!" thrusts young Prince Neden into power following an assassination, sparking military retaliation; "The Dragon's Daughter" entangles Theran ambitions with the mysterious interest of powerful dragons; and "Rise of the Ork Nation" captures a moment of self-determination, as oppressed orks claim territory and identity.

== Reception ==
Andy Butcher reviewed Prelude to War for Arcane magazine, rating it an 8 out of 10 overall, and stated that "In many ways this book represents the ideal way for a referee to deal with changes in the gameworld. It presents the information in a way that not only allows the players to become involved in the action, but also enables the referee to tailor the events to their own tastes. Rather than being dictated to by the game designer, the referee here has a lot of choice and control over how his or her campaign proceeds. In short, this is not only a well-designed book packed with possible adventure ideas, it's also something of a must for any regular Earthdawn referee."

== Reviews ==
- Valkyrie #14 (1997)
- Envoyer
