= Kanawa Land Vehicles =

Science fiction role-playing game supplement

Wheels for the Possibility Wars
- Cover art by Erik Van der Palen
- Designers: Nigel Findley
- Publishers: West End Games
- Publication: 1992; 33 years ago
- Genres: Science fiction
- Systems: Torg
- ISBN: 0-87431-330-9

Kanawa Land Vehicles, subtitled "Wheels for the Possibility Wars", is a supplement published by West End Games (WEG) in 1992 for the multi-genre role-playing game Torg.

== Contents ==
Kanawa Land Vehicles lists over sixty vehicles available for use in a Torg campaign or adventure with descriptions and game statistics. A few are horse-drawn carriages from the Victorian era such as the sulky. A few internal combustion vehicles from the first half of the twentieth century such as the 1905 Oldsmobile Coach and the 1936 Rolls Royce Phantom are also covered, but the widest range of vehicles is from the latter part of the 20th century. In addition, some high tech "science fiction" vehicles are outlined as well.

Each vehicle has its own page, and is described in detail, with precise characteristics and a schematic drawing.

The book also includes ten pages of new Torg rules that cover pursuits, accidents, maneuvers and vehicle combat.

== Publication history ==
WEG published the multi-genre role-playing game Torg in 1990, and followed up with a variety of supplements and adventures, including 1992's Kanawa Land Vehicles, a 128-page softcover book designed by Nigel Findley, with interior artwork by Rob Caswell, Stephen Crane, Cathleen Hunter, John Paul Lona, Francis Mao, and Tom Peters, and cover art by Erik Van der Palen.

== Reception ==
S. John Ross reviewed Kanawa Land Vehicles in White Wolf #33 (Sept./Oct. 1992), rating it a 3 out of 5 and stated that "If you already have all the books you need, then by all means pick it up. If not, it's no great loss. I only hope that future Kanawa books achieve this level of quality."

In the April 1993 edition of Dragon (Issue 192), Rick Swan found Kanawa Land Vehicles "disappointing... Kanawa doesn't manage anything more interesting than an armored carriage or a Chevrolet Sportvan." He concluded that it was "A curiously flat effort."

In Issue 6 of RPG Review, Lev Lafayette found the new rules for vehicles "particularly useful", but noted that "As with previous publications of this ilk, the page-per-vehicle is quite wasteful."
