= The Temple of Rec Stalek =

1992 role-playing adventure

The Temple of Rec Stalek is a 1992 role-playing adventure for Torg published by West End Games.

== Plot summary ==
The Temple of Rec Stalek is an adventure in which the player characters (Storm Knights) must deal with a death-worshipping cult.

== Publication history ==
Shannon Appelcline explained how Shane Lacy Hensley started working on the gaming industry with West End Games: "He sent them an unsolicted Torg adventure he had written. It was soon published as The Temple of Rec Stalek (1992). That first sale was quickly followed by more work for FASA, TSR and West End over the next few years."

== Reception ==
S. John Ross reviewed The Temple of Rec Stalek in White Wolf #32 (July/Aug., 1992), rating it a 3 out of 5 and stated that "Overall, this is a well-paced and exciting adventure supplement. It has a nice mix of combat, roleplaying opportunities, and investigation. It also has the distinction of being a major challenge for your group of Storm Knights."
