= Creatures of Aysle =

Creatures of Aysle is a 1991 role-playing supplement for Torg published by West End Games.

== Contents ==
Creatures of Aysle is a supplement in which game statistics for fantasy creatures are presented.

== Reception ==
S. John Ross reviewed Creatures of Aysle in White Wolf #31 (May/June, 1992), rating it a 3 out of 5 and stated that "In short, this book is an excellent source of ideas and inspiration for any TORG player, provided you don't mind shelling out the cash for the format (or can't think of any other use for your money)."
