= Operation: Hard Sell =

Operation: Hard Sell is a 1991 role-playing adventure for Torg published by West End Games.

== Plot summary ==
Operation: Hard Sell is an adventure in which a Kanawa plot intends to control the west coast of the United States.

== Reception ==
S. John Ross reviewed Operation: Hard Sell in White Wolf #29 (Oct./Nov., 1991), rating it a 3 out of 5 and stated that "Ample opportunities for characters to show off their combative and non-combative skills are present. It is good for even beginning players, due to the 'by the nose' philosophy inherent in the adventure. Players of other espionage or military games (particularly Twilight: 2000) will find the adventure adaptable on many levels."
