= The Land Below =

The Land Below is a 1991 role-playing supplement for Torg published by West End Games.

== Contents ==
The Land Below is a supplement in which underground jungle lands inhabited by dinosaurs and giant insect creatures are detailed.

== Reception ==
S. John Ross reviewed The Land Below in White Wolf #31 (May/June, 1992), rating it a 4 out of 5 and stated that "Separate chapters detail the inhabitants, landmarks, creatures, and axioms of the land. The collection of mini-adventures rounds the book out nicely, and has some interesting ideas waiting to be fleshed out for your players."
