= Orrorsh =

Cross-genre tabletop role-playing game supplement

- Publishers: West End Games
- Publication: 1991; 35 years ago
- Genres: Cross-genre
- Systems: TORG

Orrorsh is a 1991 role-playing supplement for Torg published by West End Games.

== Contents ==
Orrorsh is a supplement in which the reality known as Orrorsh is detailed.

== Reception ==
S. John Ross reviewed Orrorsh in White Wolf #31 (May/June, 1992), rating it a 3 out of 5 and stated that "Orrorsh fails as horror when compared to other TORG settings, which is particularly sad. The face is that Nippon Tech and especially the Cyberpapacy present worlds that are far richer in complex, atmospheric, intelligent horror than Orrorsh can claim, and it is there that GMs should look for feat in TORG. Orrorsh still offers great potential for interesting dark fantasy, however, and it is for that quality that interested GMs should probably consider it."

== Reviews ==
- Challenge (Issue 69)
- Windgeflüster (Issue 20 - Nov 1992)

== See also ==
Creatures of Orrorsh - A creature supplement for this book
