= Earthdawn Companion =

Tabletop fantasy role-playing game supplement

- Designers: Greg Gordon; Louis J. Prosperi
- Publishers: FASA
- Publication: 1994; 32 years ago
- Genres: Fantasy

Earthdawn Companion is a supplement published by FASA in 1994 for the fantasy role-playing game Earthdawn.

== Contents ==
Earthdawn Companion is a 168-page softcover book designed by Greg Gordon and Louis J. Prosperi, with additional material by Christopher Kubasik and Allen Varney, and illustrations by Janet Aulisio, Joel Biske, Steve Bryant, Earl Geier, Jeff Laubenstein, Larry MacDougal], Darrell Midgette, Robert Nelson, Mike Neilsen, Tony Szczudlo, and Karl Waller.

The book adds rules to the first edition of Earthdawn for characters of the 9th through 15th Circles, supplementary rules regarding magic and spells, rules for designing new disciplines and creatures, and rules for ship-to-ship combat. There are also optional rules for combat, talents and abilities, and Supporters.

Cover of the 2nd edition

For each of the second, third and fourth editions of Earthdawn, FASA published an updated Companion book with a new cover.

== Reception ==
Kevin Montanaro reviewed Earthdawn Companion in White Wolf #46 (Aug. 1994), rating it a 4 out of 5 and stated that "The book offers over 150 pages of useful information. This is an essential sourcebook for Earthdawn players, particularly those who are serious enough about their game to advance beyond Eighth Circle."

In the October 1994 edition of Dragon (Issue #210), Rick Swan did question the addition of even more content for the already complex game magic, pointing out that "the last thing the convoluted magic system needed was more rules." But overall, Swan thought the book was "a must for hardcore Earthdawn gamers."

In Issue 17 of the Australian game magazine Australian Realms, Malcolm Adler commented "The Earthdawn Companion is a good enough product, but one that is far from being necessary to play the game. For those who have enjoyed Earthdawn and are now ready for more depth you should enjoy this release, but don't expect any surprises."

=== Other reviews ===
- Backstab #4
