= Throal Adventures =

1996 role-playing game

Throal Adventures is a 1996 role-playing game adventure published by FASA for Earthdawn.

== Plot summary ==
Throal Adventures is an adventure in which a collection of three scenarios for characters of 3rd to 6th circle, serves as a companion to Throal: The Dwarf Kingdom. The adventures—"Purloined Provisions", "Deep Trouble", and "The Way Out"—all center on subterranean exploration beneath Throal. Each offers narrative twists: escorting a caravan that leads to an underground river, investigating mysterious tremors entwined with noble intrigue, and charting paths toward the Serpent River.

== Reception ==
Andy Butcher reviewed Throal Adventures for Arcane magazine, rating it a 7 out of 10 overall, and stated that "All three adventures are fairly straightforward and a touch linear, but all have at least one interesting twist which raises them above the typical 'crawl through underground' passages. With a little work from an enterprising referee any one of them could end up providing some memorable sessions of play. The only real problem with the adventures is apparent when you look at them together - all three involve the players exploring the tunnels and caverns beneath Throal, and so they're not well-suited to being run one after the other. Interspersed into an on-going campaign, though, the stories in Throal Adventures will provide a lot of enjoyment."

== Reviews ==
- Valkyrie #14 (1997)
