= The Storm Knights' Guide to the Possibility Wars =

The Storm Knights' Guide to the Possibility Wars is a 1992 role-playing supplement for Torg published by West End Games.

== Contents ==
The Storm Knights' Guide to the Possibility Wars is a supplement in which an optional system is provided for character creation.

== Reception ==
S. John Ross reviewed The Storm Knights' Guide to the Possibility Wars in White Wolf #31 (May/June, 1992), rating it a 3 out of 5 and stated that "This is a good book. Any player using it will probably find themselves with a much more interesting character than they would create with the rules in the boxed set, and non-GMs who don't want to shell out the money for the boxed set will find it worth their while. However, it is far from being a 'must-have' for any TORG player. The rules here are completely optional, and your TORG campaign will not suffer for the lack of them."
