= Creatures of Orrorsh =

Role-playing game supplement

- Publishers: West End Games
- Publication: 1992
- Genres: cross-genre
- Systems: TORG

Creatures of Orrorsh is a supplement published by West End Games in 1992 for the multi-genre role-playing game Torg.

== Contents ==
In the game Torg, transdimensional aliens have taken over Earth, and have transformed various areas into alternate realities called "cosms" that allow the gamemaster to move the players from genre to genre. The cosm of Orrorsh is a horror genre.

Creatures of Orrorsh is a book written by Bill Smith and Ed Stark that details sixty gruesome creatures that can be used by the gamemaster. Each creature is described in a two-page spread that includes an illustration, a map of where the creature lurks, and game statistics.

== Reception ==
S. John Ross reviewed Creatures of Orrorsh in White Wolf #33 (Sept./Oct., 1992), rating it a 3 out of 5 and stated that "the book would be a surefire '4' if not for the wasteful layout. The artwork is very good, with the illustrations by Tom Dow being some of the best TORG art I've seen, but the book still could have had another 60 (or more!) entries for all the space taken up by it. If that sort of thing doesn't bother you, then this book is highly recommended. Otherwise, you could get a lot more TORG material for your money."

In the October 1992 edition of Dragon (#186), Rick Swan gave the book a thumbs up, and described it as "beasts, creeps and freaks that comprise the most stomach-turning menagerie this side of a splatter-film festival... all of it nicely done." Swan also noted that "The book's authors are the winners of a contest sponsored by West End's Infiniverse newsletter that challenged the readers to come up with 'the most loathsome, hideous, evil, repulsive, repugnant, horrifying, and disgusting creatures ever created for a role-playing game.' Mission accomplished."

== See also ==
Orrorsh - A sourcebook that details the creatures' world
