= Horrors (Earthdawn) =

Earthdawn role playing game supplement, 1995

- Cover art by Nick Smith
- Designers: Robin D. Laws; Teeuwynn Woodruff; Greg Gorden; Sam Witt; Allen Varney; Chris McCubbin; Caroline Spector; Fraser Cain
- Publishers: FASA
- Publication: 1995; 31 years ago
- Genres: Fantasy

Horrors is a supplement published by FASA in 1995 for the fantasy role-playing game Earthdawn.

== Contents ==
In the world of Earthdawn, horrors are extra-dimensional astral creatures that ravaged the world for 400 years while humanity sheltered in underground cities. Horrors, supposedly written by the sage Merrox, details the fifteen most powerful horrors, six of lesser power, and three monsters created by the horrors. The book also includes sixteen pages of color plates.

== Production history ==
FASA first produced the role-playing game Earthdawn in 1993. Horrors was the eighth supplement, published by FASA in 1995 as a 112-page softcover book written by Robin D. Laws, Teeuwynn Woodruff, Greg Gorden, Sam Witt, Allen Varney, Chris McCubbin, Caroline Spector, and Fraser Cain, with additional material by Louis J. Prosperi, Rob Cruz, Diane Piron-Gelman, Andrew Raglan, and Rich Warren. Black and white illustrations were created by Joel Biske, Kent Buries, Jeff Laubenstein, Larry MacDougall, Jim Nelson, Mike Nielsen, and Mark Tedin, and color plates were by Tom Baxa, Jeff Laubenstein, Jeff Miracola, and Nick Smith; Smith also created the cover art.

== Reception ==
In the October 1995 edition of Dragon (Issue #222), Rick Swan admitted there was a already a plethora of fantasy monster collections on the market, but argued that this one was needed for the Earthdawn campaign because so little had been previously published about the horrors that are central to this role-playing game. Swan complimented the writing, which he found "strong throughout",. However he found many of the illustrations "muddy and indistinct. Which, considering the stomach-churning physiognomy of some of these guys, may be a good thing."

== Other reviews ==
- Rollespilsmagasinet Fønix, Issue 10 (October/November 1995, p.56, in Danish)
- Ringbote, Issue 13 (Jul/Aug 1997, p.84, in German)
- Envoyer, Issue 3 (Jan 1997, p.33, in German)
- Rebel Times, Issue 52 (Jan 2012, p.38, in Polish)
- Backstab #8
- Casus Belli #89

== See also ==
- Other Earthdawn publications
