= The A to Z of Babylon 5 =

1997 book

- Author: David Bassom
- Language: English
- Genre: Science fiction
- Published: 1997
- Publisher: Dell
- Pages: 320
- ISBN: 9780440223856

The A to Z of Babylon 5 is a book by David Bassom published by Boxtree.

== Contents ==
The A to Z of Babylon 5 is a guide to Babylon 5, listing entries alphabetically from the first two seasons and beginning of the third season of the show.

== Reception ==
Matt Bielby reviewed The A to Z of Babylon 5 for Arcane magazine, rating it a 6 out of 10 overall. Bielby comments that "It's ideal both for newcomers to the show and for referees developing scenarios for a GURPS-based Babylon 5-themed affair of their own, or for the official Babylon 5 game." Neil Jones of Interzone described it as "only for the real Babylon devotees". He criticized its photo selection, and general visual design.

== Reviews ==
- Review by Liz Holliday (1996) in Valkyrie, Issue 12
