= Mother Speaks =

Mother Speaks is a 1994 Earthdawn novel written by Christopher Kubasik, published by Roc Books.

== Plot summary ==
Mother Speaks is a novel in which a spellcaster leaves a note to her sons about past events from their childhood.

== Reception ==
Kevin Montanaro reviewed Mother Speaks in White Wolf Inphobia #50 (Dec., 1994), rating it a 4 out of 5 and stated that "For [the price] this isn't a bad book. It has a solid story and remains true to the Earthdawn world."

== Reviews ==
- Australian Realms #17
