= Blades (Earthdawn) =

Role-playing game supplement

Blades is a collection of five adventures published by FASA in 1995 for the fantasy role-playing game Earthdawn. The adventures involve a set of seven magical daggers and a team of player characters who must discover the knowledge to use them. The book received very different reviews, from enthusiastic to highly critical.

== Contents ==
Blades is a 104-page softcover book designed by Louis Prosperi, Robin Laws, Sam Witt, Teeuwynn Woodruff, Nicole Lindros Frein, and Diane Piron-Gelman, with interior art by Kent Burles and John Dollar, and cover art by Steve Bryant. The book contains five adventures, each designed to be completed in a single role-playing session of Earthdawn. The adventures involve a set of seven magical daggers and a team of player characters must discover the knowledge to be able to use them.

== Reception ==
In the March 1996 edition of Arcane (Issue 4), Andy Butcher found a host of problems with this book, saying, "Blades is fundamentally flawed and won't work for most groups. There are some good ideas here, though, and taken individually the component adventures serve as useful examples of the kind of thing you should be running when your players want to learn about a particular magical item. Whether that's worth the asking price, though, is a debatable question." Butcher concluded by giving Blades a very poor rating of 4 out of 10.

In the October 1996 edition of Dragon (Issue #234), Rick Swan was enthusiastic about Blades, calling it "not only the best-ever anthology for Earthdawn, it’s among the best-ever fantasy anthologies, period." Despite the many different contributors, Swan thought "the characters, encounters, and other basics are handled with effortless aplomb...The tone remains grim, the dangers ever present." He concluded by giving the anthology a top rating of 6 out of 6.

== Reviews ==
- Backstab #15 (as "Les dagues de Cara Fahd")
- Rollespilsmagasinet Fønix (Danish) (Issue 12 - Mar/Apr 1996)
- Envoyer #19
