= Throal: The Dwarf Kingdom =

Tabletop fantasy role-playing game supplement

- Publishers: FASA
- Publication: 1996; 30 years ago
- Genres: Fantasy

Throal: The Dwarf Kingdom is a 1996 role-playing game supplement published by FASA for Earthdawn.

== Contents ==
Throal: The Dwarf Kingdom is a supplement in which the heart of culture, governance, and scholarship within the land of Barsaive is detailed. As the central force in post-Scourge reconstruction, the dwarven kingdom of Throal is presented as a rich setting for ambitious campaigns, filled with political intrigue, historical depth, and social complexity. Structured across thematic chapters, the book explores Throal's founding and development, its economic systems, royal lineage, and political dynamics. It delves into cultural life—arts, education, religious devotion to the Passions—and maps out key regions including Bartertown and the surrounding mountain settlements. Campaign support includes adventure outlines, character tables, and a glossary of local terminology.

== Reception ==
Andy Butcher reviewed Throal: The Dwarf Kingdom for Arcane magazine, rating it a 7 out of 10 overall, and stated that "This is a good book that's just a bit too large for its own good. If you want to set a campaign here or fancy involving your players in the politics of Barsaive, this is а must. Those wanting a simple overview of the Kingdom, though, will be overwhelmed with detail."

== Reviews ==
- Dragon #242 (Dec., 1997)
- Shadis #32 (1996)
- Australian Realms #30
- Dragon (German Issue 5 - Nov/Dec 1999)

== See also ==
- Other Earthdawn publications
