= Mists of Betrayal =

- Publisher: FASA
- Publication date: 1993

Mists of Betrayal is a 1993 role-playing adventure for Earthdawn published by FASA.

== Contents ==
Mists of Betrayal is an adventure in which the player characters seek to unlock the potential of a magical amulet.

== Publication history ==
Mists of Betrayal was the first adventure published for Earthdawn.

== Reception ==
Kevin Montanaro reviewed Mists of Betrayal in White Wolf #43 (May, 1994), rating it a 4.5 out of 5 and stated that "An excellent adventure and intriguing story. [The price] is an adequate price for this 101-page introduction of sorts to Earthdawn."

== Reviews ==
- Dragon #202 (Feb., 1994)
- Backstab (Issue 2 - Mar/Apr 1997) (as "Les brumes de la trahison")
