= GURPS Grimoire =

1994 supplement for the GURPS role-playing game

Tech Magic, Gate Magic, and Hundreds of New Spells for All Colleges
- Cover art by Peter Scanlan
- Designers: Daniel U. Thibault; S. John Ross
- Publishers: Steve Jackson Games
- Publication: 1994; 32 years ago
- Genres: Fantasy
- Systems: GURPS third edition

GURPS Grimoire is an fantasy sourcebook for the GURPS (Generic Universal Role-Playing System), written by Daniel U. Thibault and S. John Ross, and published by Steve Jackson Games in 1994. It is a companion volume for the third edition of GURPS Magic, and in 2004 was merged into GURPS Magic third edition.

== Contents ==
GURPS Grimoire has around four hundred new spells and introduces two new Colleges, Gate and Tech. It also doubles the number of elixirs available to the alchemist.

== Publication history ==
GURPS Grimoire was written by Daniel U. Thibault and S. John Ross, and published by Steve Jackson Games (SJG).. Cover art by Peter Scanlan.

Most of its contents are also included in the fourth edition of GURPS Magic, but for players using the third edition it still is useful, especially for its updated flowcharts including spell prerequisites.

== Reception ==
Rick Swan reviewed GURPS Grimoire for Dragon magazine #210 (October 1994). Swan comments: "This imaginative collection of spells for the GURPS game adds hundreds of options to the already lengthy list in the GURPS Magic supplement. Animal, Elemental, Gate, Necromantic, and Sound are among the nearly two dozen categories; sample effects include rain of stones, accelerate time, and cloud vaulting. A fascinating section of technological spells allows post-industrial mages to expel radioactive breath, create sentient computers, and speak with lawn mowers. Though everything's in GURPS-speak, a diligent referee should be able to convert it all to the system of his choice."

== Reviews ==
- Coleção Dragão Brasil

== See also ==
- List of GURPS publications
