= The Destiny Map =

Tabletop role-playing game supplement

- Cover art by David Dorman, 1990
- Designers: Christopher Kubasik
- Publishers: West End Games, Ulisses Spiele
- Publication: 1990 The Destiny Map WEG; 2020 The Destiny Map Redux Ulisses Spiele
- Genres: cross-genre
- Systems: TORG
- ISBN: 978-0874313093

Relics of Power Redux published by Ulisses Spiele in 2020.

The Destiny Map is an adventure published by West End Games in 1990 for the cross-genre role-playing game Torg.

== Description ==
The Storm Knights (player characters) in the United States (now a part of the primitive pseudo-reality of Baruk Kaah) discover a fragment of an ancient map that may lead to weapons the Storm Knights can use against the invading aliens. The Storm Knights must follow clues across the world to uncover more fragments of the map before their enemies can.

The original [West End Games publication also included a gamemaster's screen.

== Publication history ==
[West End Games published the Torg role-playing game in 1990, and quickly followed up with a series of supplements and adventures, including The Destiny Map, a 64-page book written by Christopher Kubasik, with interior art by Thomas Baxa, and cover art by David Dorman. A cardstock gamemaster's screen was also included.

The Destiny Map was the first scenario in the Relics of Power adventure trilogy, and was followed by The Possibility Chalice and The Forever City, both also published in 1990.

The entire Relics of Power trilogy was revised for Torg Eternity and published as Relics of Power Redux by Ulisses Spiele in 2020.

== Reception ==
In the July 1990 edition of Games International (Issue 16), Paul Mason commended the "non-stop action", and called the adventure "detailed and tightly plotted." But he noted the pulp magazine tone of the adventure and warned players, "Whether you'll enjoy it depends on how you feel about the pulpishness of the background."

Craig Schaefer reviewed the product in the December 1990-January 1991 issue of White Wolf. He stated that various factors make it "a perfect introduction to the Torg game for players and GMs alike. Good B&W artwork and a helpful gamemaster's screen round off this strong opening adventure". He rated it a 4 out of 5 possible points.
