= Caliver Books =

Game publisher

Caliver Books is a UK company specializing in resources for military history and wargaming. They operate a physical bookstore in Eastwood, Nottinghamshire and own a publishing division called Partizan Press and a miniature figurines distributor called Minifigs.

== Partizan Press ==
Partizan Press is a publisher of military history, especially about the English Civil War. Partizan published the quarterly roleplaying magazine Valkyrie Quarterly from 1994 to 2003.

== Minifigs ==
Minifigs (Miniature Figurines Ltd.) was founded in 1964 in Newark-on-Trent, later moving to Southampton. It was run by Neville Dickinson and was the first company to sell fantasy wargaming miniatures. In 1975, TSR Inc. cut its first licensing deal with Miniature Figurines to manufacture models of Dungeons & Dragons monsters. Caliver acquired Minifigs in 2009.
