= Living Room Games =

Living Room Games was an American game company, active between 2000 and 2006, that produced role-playing games, game supplements and books, for Earthdawn, Digital Burn, and Capcom World Tournament.

== Description ==
Living Room Games licensed Earthdawn from FASA Corp in 2000, and published second edition of the game in 2001, and a revised second edition in 2005. FASA also granted RedBrick a parallel Earthdawn license. RedBrick called their product line EarthDawn Classic to differentiate from those of Living Room Games, and to indicate that they were modeling the art styles and setting used in the original FASA products.

Living Room Games also published Digital Burn, Tony Digerolamo's Complete Mafia for D20, and Capcom World Tournament. The Capcom World Tournament was canceled in 2006, and no further items were produced after that year. The company has since dissolved, and its domain belongs to a different, unrelated company called "Living Room Games Online", which focuses primarily on online slots and casinos.

== Publications ==
- Barsaive At War - 2001
- Barsaive in Chaos - 2002
- Cities of Barsaive - unpublished
- Corrupted Lands - unpublished
- Dangerous Goods - unpublished
- Earthdawn (2nd Edition) - 2001
- Earthdawn (2nd Edition, Revised) - 2005
- Earthdawn Companion (2nd Edition) - 2001
- Earthdawn Companion (2nd Edition, Revised) - 2006
- Gamemaster's Screen w/Into the Breach (2nd Edition) - 2002
- Makers of Legend #1 - The Way of War - 2003
- Makers of Legend #2 - The Wanderer's Way - 2005
- Makers of Legend #3 - Way of Will - unpublished
- Path of Deception - 2000
- Scourge Unending - 2003
- The Book of Dragons (Revised, Expanded) - 2004
