= GURPS Russia =

Tabletop fantasy role-playing game supplement

- Cover by Gene Seabolt
- Designers: S. John Ross
- Publishers: Steve Jackson Games
- Publication: 1988; 38 years ago
- Genres: Historical fantasy
- Systems: GURPS

GURPS Russia is a role-playing game supplement by S. John Ross, published by Steve Jackson Games in 1998 for the GURPS (Generic Universal Role-Playing System) rule set.

== Description ==
This book enables gamemasters to design a GURPS campaign set in medieval Russia. Chapters include:

- Life in medieval Russia: Life in a Russian village, city life, social organizations, Cossack society, notable locations, geography, and climate.
- Russians: Creating player characters, and equipping them.
- Russian history
- Religion
- Fantasy Russia: Various mythical locations, with descriptions of folklore, magic, and notable legendary figures
- Bestiary, including domestic, feral and supernatural creatures
- The Russian Campaign: How to design and implement a campaign setting in medieval Russia

Twelve ideas for adventures are also included, some using strictly historical background, others using mythical fantasy.

== Publication history ==
In the 2014 book Designers & Dragons: the '80s, game historian Shannon Appelcline noted that after Steve Jackson Games (SJG) published the unusual In Nomine in 1997, SJG decided to try experimenting with GURPS: GURPS Russia, released on February 28, 1998 was the most controversial experiment. Because retailers were unwilling to order a game on medieval Russia in more than token numbers, Jackson released GURPS Russia through a new 'straight line' program that made it available only through SJG's website. There was considerable anger and distress over this, from fans and retailers alike. As Jackson expected, the book did well, and it was later reprinted for release through the standard distribution network."

GURPS Russia is a 128-page book designed by S. John Ross, with additional material provided by Romas Buivydas, Graeme Davis, Steffan O'Sullivan, and Brian J. Underhill, with interior art by Heather Bruton, Eric Hotz, and Ramon Perez, and cover art by Gene Seabolt. SJG published it in 1998.

== Reception ==
In the August 1998 edition of Dragon (Issue #250), Ray Winninger called this "quite a bit better than the average GURPS historical sourcebook." Winninger found some of the historical material dry, and suggested that replacing some of it with more material on "designing and running Russian campaigns would have made for a much better book." Despite this, he concluded that "GURPS Russia still boasts plenty of useful tidbits between its covers."

== Reviews ==
- Backstab #9
- Fishbaugh, Brent (July 1998). "GURPS Russia". InQuest. No. 39. Wizard Entertainment. p. 36.
