= The Possibility Chalice =

Cross-genre tabletop role-playing game adventure

- The Possibility Chalice published by West End Games in 1990. cover by David Dorman.
- Designers: Douglas Kaufman
- Publishers: West End Games; Ulisses Spiele
- Publication: 1990 1st edition WEG; 2020 2nd edition Ulisses Spiele
- Genres: cross-genre
- Systems: TORG

Relics of Power Redux published by Ulisses Spiele in 2020.

The Possibility Chalice is the second of three adventures in the Relics of Power trilogy published by West End Games (WEG) in 1990 for the cross-genre role-playing game Torg.

== Description ==
In The Destiny Map, Part One of the Relics of Power trilogy, the Storm Knights (player characters) tracked down fragments of an ancient map that may lead to weapons the Storm Knights can use against the invading aliens. In the sequel, The Possibility Chalice, the Storm Knights try to reach an ancient artifact before their enemies can.

== Publication history ==
WEG published the Torg role-playing game in 1990, and quickly followed up with a series of supplements and adventures, including the three-part Relics of Power adventures. The second adventure, The Possibility Chalice, was a 64-page saddle-stapled book written by Douglas Kaufman, with interior art by Tim Wright, and cover art by David Dorman, and published by WEG in 1990.

The Possibility Chalice was followed by the final part of the trilogy, The Forever City, also published in 1990.

The entire Relics of Power trilogy was revised for Torg Eternity and published by Ulisses Spiele in 2020 as Relics of Power Redux.

== Reception ==
In the November–December 1990 issue of White Wolf, Craig Schaefer thought that this product compared poorly to its predecessor, stating "The Destiny Map was gripping and tightly written [but] The Possibility Chalice is a sad relapse to 'hack and slash' adventuring." Schaefer gave it a poor rating of only a 2 out of 5.
