= Uresia: Grave of Heaven =

Fantasy world for role-playing games

Uresia: Grave of Heaven is an anime-inspired fantasy world for role-playing games written by S. John Ross. Originally published for the Big Eyes, Small Mouth role-playing game, the most recent edition published in 2012 is systemless. Like the previous edition, it includes maps drawn by the author. Uresia was originally published by Guardians of Order.

Uresia is a world in which all the gods destroyed themselves in a heavenly war that sent the godly realms crashing towards Earth, destroying the continents and killing most of the population. Now, centuries later, new civilizations have arisen on the spray of islands left behind, influenced by the nature of the dead gods.

Obvious influences include the Slayers and Record of Lodoss War anime series, and other fantasy works including the Zork computer games, the gamebooks of Joe Dever, and the Discworld novels. The world's apocalyptic origins are, according to the author, inspired by the opening scene of Project A-Ko.

It includes a wide variety of sentient races, from fantasy standards to things like cat-girls (and other felinoids), Slimes similar to those seen in the Dragon Quest series of video games, sapient snowmen, and more. It is also notable for a depiction of sexuality that is much freer and more open than other similar settings.

The first Big Eyes, Small Mouth version of Uresia was published in 2003 and a new edition, adapted to the d20 System published by Wizards of the Coast, appeared in 2004. An online publisher of electronic gaming material, Cumberland Games and Diversions, is owned by S. John Ross and has published both font and electronic-book supplements for Uresia, first under license, and then as Uresia's sole publisher after acquiring the rights in 2005. Ross also maintains Blue Lamp Road, a homepage dedicated to the fantasy world, and featuring fan-written expansions and characters. The most recent version, published by Cumberland, was released in late September, 2012 through the Lulu print-on-demand system and on PDF.

In September 2012, S. John Ross released a new version of Uresia as part of his All-Systems Library series of gaming material. The new version of Uresia is written as all setting, with no single specific role-playing game required to use it.
