= Terror in the Skies (Earthdawn) =

Role-playing game adventure

Terror in the Skies is a 1994 role-playing adventure for Earthdawn published by FASA.

== Plot summary ==
Terror in the Skies is an adventure in which the player characters join an airship patrol in Travar, which are attacked by the fire-breathing Rakken.

== Reception ==
Kevin Montanaro reviewed Terror in the Skies in White Wolf Inphobia #55 (May, 1995), rating it a 4.5 out of 5 and stated that "Beyond an entertaining adventure, Terror in the Skies features new rules for airship combat, new magical treasures and reusable critters. [The price] might seem somewhat steep for an adventure book, though."

A review for Świat Gier Komputerowych calls the Polish edition of the adventure (Koszmar z przestworzy) well-designed, addressing a common difficulty players face with the game’s unusual setting by clearly presenting the designers’ intended vision of the world. The adventure is praised for combining setting-specific elements with familiar fantasy motifs, including historical lore, a powerful antagonist, urban intrigue, exploration of ancient sites, and airship combat. The reviewer highlights the plot structure, noting the effective escalation of tension from a modest opening to a climactic finale, and commends the smooth progression from small-scale events to heroic actions. While the scenario is described as linear and therefore best suited to less experienced player groups, the review suggests that an experienced game master can adapt it successfully for more veteran players. Additional materials included in the supplement—particularly rules for airship combat and a selection of new magical items—are seen as valuable resources beyond the adventure itself. Overall, the review concludes that the adventure is a solid and enjoyable scenario that serves as a useful tool for moderately experienced game masters and their groups.
