= Sky Point & Vivane =

Tabletop fantasy role-playing game supplement

- Publishers: FASA
- Publication: 1995; 30 years ago
- Genres: Fantasy

Sky Point & Vivane is a 1995 role-playing game supplement for Earthdawn published by FASA.

== Publication history ==
Sky Point & Vivane is the third boxed Campaign Set for Earthdawn.

== Contents ==
Sky Point & Vivane is a supplement which focuses on the city of Viviane, as well as the nearby Sky Point military base and the Vivane Province surrounding them, and the supplement also presents new information regarding the Theran Empire and its lands.

== Reception ==
Andy Butcher reviewed Sky Point & Vivane for Arcane magazine, rating it an 8 out of 10 overall. Butcher comments that "Sky Point & Vivane is a great supplement. The central conflict makes the place hugely interesting, and it's packed full of enough information and ideas to provide a solid base for a whole campaign."

== Reviews ==
- Dragon #225 (Jan., 1996)
- Envoyer #20
- Australian Realms #27

== See also ==
- Other Earthdawn publications
