= Cumberland Games & Diversions =

Electronic publishing company

Cumberland Games & Diversions is an electronic publishing company specializing in indie roleplaying games and TrueType fonts.

== History ==
In 1993, S. John Ross wrote a light-hearted role-playing game called Risus: The Anything RPG. Six years later, in 1999, he founded Cumberland Games & Diversions to publish Risus, as well as the HexPaper mapping font. Ross uses it to publish indie role-playing games such as Uresia: Grave of Heaven, assisted by his wife Sandra, and by freelance creators including friend and artist Dan Smith.

Cumberland offers several commercial titles in multiple lines, including more than a dozen fonts called Sparks which produced simple paper models to be used as gaming miniatures. Other commercial lines include the All-Systems Library of rules-free resource books.

== Reception ==
The website RPG Resource called Cumberland Games & Diversions "a shining example of how the Internet has opened up the games market to those with ideas and talent, but who do not have the resources, time or inclination to go into business in a big way... Here, S. John Ross shares RPGs and other goodies via PDF files, many being free downloads and others for a small charge."

== Publications ==
=== Roleplaying Games ===
- Encounter Critical: A Science-Fiction Fantasy Role Play Game
- Pokéthulhu Adventure Game
- Risus: The Anything RPG
- Uresia: Grave of Heaven
