= Magic: A Manual of Mystic Secrets =

Tabletop role-playing game supplement

Magic
A Manual of Mystic Secrets
- Cover art by John Zeleznik
- Designers: Louis Prosperi; Steve Kenson; Loren Coleman
- Publishers: FASA
- Publication: 1996; 30 years ago
- Genres: Fantasy

Magic: A Manual of Mystic Secrets is a supplement published by FASA in 1996 for the fantasy role-playing game Earthdawn.

== Contents ==
Magic: A Manual of Mystic Secrets is a 144-page softcover book designed by Louis Prosperi, Steve Kenson, and Loren Coleman, with cover art by John Zeleznik. It explores the force of magic which binds the world together, going into further detail on information previously provided in the original rules and supplements such as Barsaive, and presenting new magical powers and abilities.

== Reception ==
In the May 1996 edition of Arcane (Issue 6), Andy Butcher liked the book, saying, "the book helps to give referees and players alike a better 'feel' for the Earthdawn world and how it 'works'." He concluded by giving the book an above average rating of 8 out of 10.

In the July 1996 edition of Dragon (Issue 231), Rick Swan liked that this book simplified Earthdawn's original complex magic system. Swan did find that some sections were not as good as others: How to create magic items was "comprehensive but confusing"; Astral space "isn't all that different from the physical world"; and the book's tour of the planes was "about as exciting as a wheelchair race at a rest home." However, Swan gave the book an above average rating of 5 out of 6, saying "Barsaive veterans should consider this an essential purchase: the Manual of Mystic Secrets finds the holes in Earthdawn and fills them up."

== Reviews ==
- Envoyer #21
- Casus Belli #94
- Australian Realms #28
