= Christopher Kubasik =

American writer and game designer

Christopher Kubasik, also known as Chris Kubasik, is an American author of role-playing games, sourcebooks, adventures and fiction novels set in them, as well as a screenwriter and creator of the TV series The Booth At The End.

== Career ==
Kubasik worked at FASA Corporation for five years from 1987 to 1992. Kubasik has contributed to Earthdawn, BattleTech, Shadowrun, Star Wars, Torg, and Advanced Dungeons & Dragons role-playing games. He has written tie-in novels for Earthdawn, BattleTech and Shadowrun. Greg Gorden designed the rules for Earthdawn, while Kubasik created the world for the game.

Kubasik has done screenwriting for New Line Cinema. In 2006 he worked as the Head Writer for the Internet show "Stranger Adventures," which was nominated for three Emmy Awards for Broadband Entertainment in 2006. He also was the creator and head writer of the television series The Booth At The End. In 2008, he compared the Internet's effect on film-making to the Wild West, saying "It's like we are in California 100 years ago, with a movie camera and a tent setting up on the side of a river, saying: 'OK, what are we going to shoot today?'"

=== Works ===
- Battletech novels
  - Ideal War, 1993, ISBN 0-451-45212-7
- Earthdawn novels
  - The Longing Ring, 1993, ISBN 0-451-45277-1
  - Mother Speaks, 1994, ISBN 0-451-45297-6
  - Poisoned Memories, 1994, ISBN 0-451-45329-8
- Shadowrun novels
  - Changeling, 1992, ISBN 0-451-45163-5
- Torg supplements
  - The Living Land, 1990
  - The Destiny Map, 1990
