= Masters of Dragonlance Art =

2002 fantasy artbook

Masters of Dragonlance Art is a 2002 book edited by Mark Sehestedt.

== Contents ==
Masters of Dragonlance Art is a book in which full color art from various Dragonlance publications is presented.

== Reviews ==
- Chronicle
- Review by Karen Haber (2003) in Locus, #505 February 2003
