= Horror vacui =

Horror vacui can refer to:

- Horror vacui (art), a concept in art approximately translated from Latin fear of empty spaces
- Horror vacui (philosophy), a philosophical theory about physics
- Horror Vacui (film), a 1984 German satirical film
- Horror Vacui (album), by Linea 77
- Horror Vacui, a composition by Jonny Greenwood
