= GURPS Warehouse 23 =

Role-playing game supplement

- Designers: S. John Ross
- Publishers: Steve Jackson Games
- Publication: December 1997; 29 years ago
- Genres: Weird science, conspiracy
- Systems: GURPS

GURPS Warehouse 23 is a 1997 role-playing game supplement written by S. John Ross, and published by Steve Jackson Games for their GURPS system.

== Contents ==
GURPS Warehouse 23 is a supplement in which a secret government warehouse is filled with mythic artifacts and conspiracy-laced relics. Structured into six sections, it begins with the warehouse's fictional backstory, complete with NPCs and maps. Alternate settings are also explored, expanding the concept into different genres and game worlds. The core of the book dives into cataloging the mysterious contents inside: legendary items such as the Ark of the Covenant and the Spear of Destiny, strange creatures like Yetis and lost dinosaurs, and bizarre technologies associated with The Conspiracy. Later sections add skills, genre adaptations, and a comprehensive timeline interweaving countless conspiracy theories.

== Reception ==
Andy Butcher reviewed GURPS Warehouse 23 for Arcane magazine, rating it an 8 out of 10 overall, and stated that "The idea of the warehouse itself is excellent, but even if you don't use the place as a whole, the vast array of secrets presented is fascinating in itself. Excellent stuff."

== Reviews ==
- Backstab #3
- Casus Belli #104
- The Unspeakable Oath #16/17 (2001 Digest)
- Ringbote (Issue 13 - Jul/Aug 1997)
