= Pyramid (magazine) =

American gaming magazine (1993–2018)

- Issue 1, 1993
- Categories: Gaming
- Publisher: Steve Jackson Games
- Founded: 1993
- First issue: 1993; 33 years ago
- Final issue Number: December 2018; Volume 3, 122
- Country: United States
- Based in: Austin, Texas
- Language: English

Pyramid was a US gaming magazine, publishing articles primarily on role-playing games, but including board games, card games, and other sorts of games. It began in 1993 as a print publication of Steve Jackson Games for its first 30 issues, and was published on the Internet from March 1998. Print issues were bimonthly; the first online version published new articles each week; the second online version was monthly, published until December 2018. Pyramid was headquartered in Austin, Texas. It replaced Steve Jackson Games' previous magazine Roleplayer.

Pyramid published general gaming articles by freelance authors, as well as Designer's Notes by Steve Jackson Games product developers, industry news, cartoons, and gaming product reviews. Although articles tended to concentrate on Steve Jackson Games products such as GURPS, it published articles on other games such as d20 System, Talisman, Nobilis, Hero System, and published various comic strips and single-panel cartoons. Steve Jackson Games also briefly published another online magazine, d20 Weekly for several months using a very similar model to that of Pyramid. However, the venture was not a success, and was eventually folded into a slightly expanded Pyramid.

The online subscription system used for Pyramid also granted access to subscriber forums, a dedicated chat server, and occasional pre-publication playtest material for Steve Jackson Games and other companies' products. In 2008 this was changed: Pyramid became available as a PDF download from e23 (online service), and the subscriber forums were discontinued.

In late 2018, it was announced on the Pyramid page of the Steven Jackson Games website that "we are closing down Pyramid magazine later this year. The December 2018 issue will be the final issue of the magazine, and effective immediately, we are no longer accepting subscriptions."

== Publication history ==
Shannon Appelcline noted that Steve Jackson Games stopped publishing Roleplayer magazine with issue #30 in 1993, "but only so that Steve Jackson Games could start a new magazine. Pyramid debuted in May 1993. It was an ironic return to the generalist magazine industry—though it also promised to incorporate the SJG material that had once been printed in Autoduel Quarterly and Roleplayer." Appelcline noted that the magazine covered SJG games including Car Wars, but covered GURPS so strongly that "SJG always had problems selling Pyramid as a non-house organ. Contrariwise Car Wars quickly faded away. The new magazine also looked quite nice, with glossy pages and some full color pages—luxuries that Space Gamer had enjoyed only briefly. It soon became entirely color, as SJG's star continued to rise over the next few years." Appelcline concluded that Steve Jackson Games began "having concerns over the profitability of publishing a generalist magazine. They finished up Pyramid's print run with #30 (March/April 1998), and began publishing 'volume two' of Pyramid as an online, weekly, subscription-based magazine and were able to successfully do so for 10 years." Appelcline also noted that as the company was moving to PDF publications, Steve Jackson Games ended the HTML second volume of Pyramid and reinvented it in 2008 as a PDF-only third volume of Pyramid.

== Editors ==
- Derek Pearcy—Print issues 1–2.
- Jeff Koke—Print issues 3–4.
- Scott Haring—Print issues 5–30. Online edition March 1998 – February 2000.
- S. John Ross—Online edition 1998.
- Steven Marsh—Online edition February 2000 – December 2018.

== Awards ==
- 2001: Origins Award Best Professional Game Magazine of 2000
- 2004: Origins Award Gamer's Choice: Best Electronic Product of 2003
- 2005: Origins Award Best Non Fiction Publication of 2004

== List of issues ==
=== Volume 1 ===
the printed version, retroactively referred to as Pyramid Classic:

- 01: May–June 1993
- 30: March 1998, same cover art as GURPS Wizards

=== Volume 2 ===
There are 1877 samples of articles released in it.

Issues:

- 001: April 1998
- 558: November 2008

Articles:

- 1: A Minor Emergency
- 7: Electronic Gaming News
- 8: Warehouse 23
- 91: Autoduel Japan
- 1002: Suppressed Transmission published August 13, 1999
- 2630: When Good LARPers Go Bad published March 1, 2002

=== Volume 3 ===
- 01: Tools of the Trade - Wizards, November 2008
- 02: Looks Like a Job for . . . Superheroes, December 2008
- 03: Venturing Into the Badlands - Post Apocalypse, January 2009
- 04: Magic on the Battlefield, February 2009
- 05: Horror & Spies, March 2009
- 06: Space Colony Alpha, April 2009
- 07: Urban Fantasy, May 2009
- 08: Cliffhangers, June 2009
- 09: Space Opera, July 2009
- 10: Crime and Grime, August 2009
- 11: Cinematic Locations, September 2009
- 12: Tech and Toys, October 2009
- 13: Thaumatology, November 2009
- 14: Martial Arts December 2009
- 15: Transhuman Space, January 2010
- 16: Historical Exploration, February 2010
- 17: Modern Exploration, March 2010
- 18: Space Exploration, April 2010
- 19: Tools of the Trade: Clerics, May 2010
- 20: Infinite Worlds, June 2010
- 21: Cyberpunk, July 2010
- 22: Banestorm, August 2010
- 23: Action Adventures, September 2010
- 24: Bio-Tech, October 2010
- 25: Epic Magic, November 2010
- 26, Underwater Adventures, December 2010
- 27: Monsters in Space, January 2011
- 28: Thaumatology II, February 2011
- 29: Psionics, March 2011
- 30: Spaceships, April 2011
- 31: Monster Hunters, May 2011
- 32: Fears of Days Past, June 2011
- 33: Low-Tech, July 2011
- 34: Alternate GURPS, August 2011
- 35: Aliens, September 2011
- 36: Dungeon Fantasy, October 2011
- 37: Tech and Toys II, November 2011
- 38: The Power of Myth, December 2011
- 39: Steampunk, January 2012
- 40: Vehicles, February 2012
- 41: Fantasy World Building, March 2012
- 42: Noir, April 2012
- 43: Thaumatology III, May 2012
- 44: Alternate GURPS II, June 2012
- 45: Monsters, July 2012
- 46: Weird Science, August 2012
- 47: The Rogue's Life, September 2012
- 48: Secret Magic, October 2012
- 49: World-Hopping, November 2012
- 50: Dungeon Fantasy II, December 2012
- 51: Tech and Toys III, January 2013
- 52: Low-Tech II, February 2012
- 53: Action, March 2012
- 54: Social Engineering, April 2013
- 55: Military Sci-Fi, May 2013
- 56: Prehistory, June 2013
- 57: Gunplay, July 2013
- 58: Urban Fantasy II, August 2013
- 59: Conspiracies, September 2013
- 60: Dungeon Fantasy III, October 2013
- 61: Way of the Warrior, November 2013
- 62: Transhuman Space II, December 2013
- 63: Infinite Worlds II, January 2014
- 64: Pirates and Swashbucklers, February 2014
- 65: Alternate GURPS III, March 2014
- 66: The Laws of Magic, April 2014
- 67: Tools of the Trade: Villains, May 2014
- 68: Natural Magic, June 2014
- 69: Psionics II, July 2014
- 70: Fourth Edition Festival, August 2014
- 71: Spaceships II, September 2014
- 72: Alternate Dungeons, October 2014
- 73: Monster Hunters II, November 2014
- 74: Wild West, December 2014
- 75: Hero's Jackpot, January 2015
- 76: Dungeon Fantasy IV, February 2014
- 77: Combat, March 2015
- 78: Unleash Your Soul, April 2014
- 79: Space Atlas, May 2015
- 80: Fantasy Threats, June 2015
- 81: Horrific Creations, July 2015
- 82: Magical Creations, August 2015
- 83: Alternate GURPS IV, September 2015
- 84: Perspectives, October 2015
- 85: Cutting Edge, November 2015
- 86: Organizations, December 2015
- 87: Low-Tech III, January 2016
- 88: The End Is Nigh, February 2016
- 89: Alternate Dungeons II, March 2016
- 90: After the End, April 2016
- 91: Thaumatology IV, May 2016
- 92: Zombies, June 2016
- 93: Cops and Lawyers, July 2016
- 94: Spaceships III, August 2016
- 95: Overland Adventures, September 2016
- 96: Tech and Toys IV, October 2016
- 97: Strange Powers, November 2016
- 98: Welcome to Dungeon Fantasy, December 2016
- 99: Death and Beyond, January 2017
- 100: Pyramid Secrets, February 2017
- 101: Humor, March 2017
- 102: Epic, April 2017
- 103: Setbacks, May 2017
- 104: Dungeon Fantasy Roleplaying Game, June 2017
- 105: Cinematic Magic, July 2017
- 106: Dungeon Fantasy Roleplaying Game II, August 2017
- 107: Monster Hunters III, September 2017
- 108: Dungeon Fantasy Roleplaying Game II, October 2017
- 109: Thaumatology V, November 2017
- 110: Deep Space, December 2017
- 111: Combat II, January 2018
- 112: Action II, February 2018
- 113: Dungeon Fantasies, March 2018
- 114: Mind Over Magic, April 2018
- 115: Technomancer, May 2018
- 116: Locations, June 2018
- 117: Hot Spots, July 2018
- 118: Dungeon Trips, August 2018
- 119: After the End II, September 2018
- 120: Alternate GURPS V, October 2018
- 121: Travels and Tribulations, November 2018
- 122: All Good Things, December 2018

== Reviews ==
- Dragon #212 (December 1994) p94
