= Daniel Horne =

American artist

- Born: 1960; Pittsburgh, Pennsylvania, United States
- Known for: Fantasy art

Daniel Horne is an artist whose work has appeared in role-playing games.

== Early life ==
Daniel R. Horne was born in Pittsburgh, Pennsylvania in 1960.

== Works ==
Daniel Horne has produced interior and cover illustrations for role-playing game books since 1986. In addition to several covers for Dragon and Dungeon magazine, Horne illustrated the covers of several Dungeons & Dragons books, including Talons of Night (1987), The Shattered Statue (1987), Fate of Istus (1989), Dark and Hidden Ways (1990), and the World Builder's Guidebook (1996). Horne also did role-playing game work for Iron Crown Enterprises, West End Games, Alderac Entertainment Group, and Troll Lord Games.

Horne also illustrated cards for the Magic: The Gathering collectible card game.

His work is included in the book Masters of Dragonlance Art.

He is also an illustrator of children's books, including Young Merlin by Robert D. San Souci. One reviewer wrote that his "bold illustrations shimmer with magic", and another said that his "stunning color illustrations are appropriately dark and mysterious."

== Bibliography ==
- The Paradise War (1993)
- Zorro: The Daring Escapades (2020)
