= Greg Gorden =

American game designer

- Occupation: Game designer

Greg Gorden is an American game designer who has worked primarily on role-playing games.

== Career ==
Greg Gorden has worked for several gaming companies:

- For Victory Games he participated, during the early 1980s, in the design of the James Bond 007 role-playing game (1983).
- For Mayfair Games he was in 1985 the main designer on the DC Heroes role-playing game. Also for Mayfair Games, partnering with White Wolf, he designed D.O.A., but the game was not published.
- For West End Games Gorden brought help to Greg Costikyan and the WEG team in the design of all the editions of Star Wars: The Roleplaying Game (1987, 1992 and 1996). For the same game, in the supplements' list, he was the main author of The Star Wars Rules Companion (1989) and the Imperial Sourcebook (First Edition: 1989, Second Edition: 1994). Also for West End Games, and with help from Douglas Kaufman and Bill Slavicsek, Gorden designed Torg (1990).
- For FASA, Gorden designed the rules of the role-playing game Earthdawn (1993).
- For the Pinnacle Entertainment Group, Shane Lacy Hensley (founder of the company) wrote a draft for his Deadlands game and flew his friends Gorden and Matt Forbeck to Virginia; Gorden and Forbeck liked the draft and asked if they could buy into Hensley's company, although Gorden left because of personal reasons.
- Gorden's Dungeons & Dragons work (edited by different companies, from TSR to Wizards of the Coast) includes Castle Greyhawk (1988), Elder Evils (2007), Dungeon Master's Guide 2 (2009), and Monster Manual 2 (2009).
