= Torg =

Cross-genre tabletop role-playing game

The Battle for a Reality-Torn Earth
- Box cover by Daniel Horne
- Designers: Greg Gorden; Bill Slavicsek
- Publishers: West End Games; Ulisses Spiele
- Publication: 1990 (original); 1992 (updated rules 1.1); 2005 ("Revised & Expanded" 1.5); 2017 ("Torg: Eternity")
- Genres: Cross-genre
- Systems: TORG

Torg is a cinematic cross-genre tabletop role-playing game created by Greg Gorden and Bill Slavicsek, with art by Daniel Horne. It was first published by West End Games (WEG) in 1990. Game resolution uses a single twenty-sided die, drama cards and a logarithmic results table, which later formed the basis for WEG's 1992 sci-fi RPG Shatterzone and 1994 universal RPG Masterbook. WEG produced over fifty supplements, novels and comics for the first edition. A revised and expanded core rule book was produced in 2005, with a single adventure.

After WEG closed in 2010, Torg was sold to Ulisses Spiele, who, after a successful crowdfunding campaign, published a new edition called Torg: Eternity in 2018.

== Overview ==
Torg takes place in a near future setting, known officially as "the near now". At the starting point in the game setting, Earth has been subjected to an inter-dimensional invasion by a series of "High Lords", who have changed the natural laws of large swaths of the planet, to reflect those of their home dimensions. The players assume the role of "Storm Knights": heroes from Earth and the various invading realms, who possess limited reality-altering abilities used to oppose the plans of the High Lords. The game's title, Torg, refers to an ultimate in-game title that individual leaders of the invasion strive to achieve.

== Game mechanics ==
Torg branded itself as a "cinematic" game and tried to emphasize game play in a manner similar to adventure films such as Indiana Jones or Land of the Lost. Terminology used in the game reflects this fact. For example, encounters are divided into sub units known as "acts" and "scenes". Conflict resolution also reflects the cinematic nature of the game. Actions are resolved by a player rolling a twenty-sided die, resulting in a modifier which is applied to the relevant attribute or skill, which is compared against a difficulty number. The degree by which the total exceeds the difficulty number of the task influences how successful the player is at the action. Rolls of 10 or 20 allow the player to roll again, adding their new total to the previous. This can be continued indefinitely as long as the player rolls a 10 or 20, allowing for fantastic feats in a cinematic style. The wound system, which stresses incapacitating damage over lethal kinds, also mimics the style of adventure films, wherein the hero may often be incapacitated, but is rarely killed.

In addition, Torg uses an unusual card-based system to augment gameplay. From Torg's unique "Drama Deck", a hand of 4 cards are dealt to each player at the beginning of the game. The rest are stacked in front of the game master. Cards can be used by both players and game masters to influence play. Whenever a combat encounter begins, the game master flips over a card which dictates certain advantages and disadvantages for the players and the non-player characters (NPCs). Players can also use cards to give themselves advantages, or even plotlines, which could result in extra points.

Players are rewarded with "possibility points", which can be spent to improve the characters abilities, similar to many other role-playing games. However, unlike in most role-playing games, possibility points (or "possibility energy") also exists as an in-game phenomenon, and characters may spend these points to achieve certain effects, such as healing, or changing results during play.

Character creation is limited. Both the basic set, as well as subsequent supplements, provide several character templates based on general archetypes such as "Eidenos Hunter", "Vengeful Human" or "Werewolf". These come complete with a general background story and a pre-set roster of attributes and possessions. Character customization is limited to distributing points among an array of dictated skills. Even though there is a simplified instruction to create templates in the back of the core rulebook, further supplements allow for more freedom in designing characters.

== Characters ==
Player characters are dubbed "Storm Knights". These are heroes who are able to alter reality in limited ways. Storm Knights can come from all of the different realities in the game, and oppose the invaders for various personal reasons. Although one can play as a normal human, some of the Storm Knights are natives of the invaders' home worlds, and some are natives of Earth who have "flipped" to the invaders' reality, allowing them to use abilities and technology as if born to that reality. A person becomes a Storm Knight by experiencing a reality crisis, which links them to a particular invading reality that 'washes' over them during the initial invasion.

The primary way in which Storm Knights are able to shape reality is the ability to impose the rules of their own reality on a limited area of another reality. Each reality, or "cosm", has a set of four "axioms", which delineate what could be achieved under its rules. The most important of these for gameplay are the social, technological, magical, and spiritual axioms. For ordinary people, violating the laws of a reality is improbable, and becomes increasingly impossible over time. For example, when the Neolithic reality of The Living Land invades North America, soldiers find that their guns and radios no longer work because the tech-axiom of the cosm only allows for a Neolithic level of technology. Storm Knights, however, carry their own reality with them. Normally, they can perform under their own reality wherever they go, sometimes requiring a check against their reality skill, the key skill possessed by all Storm Knights, to accomplish feats which particularly violate the rules of a reality.

Storm Knights can also spend possibility energy in order to influence reality. One way they can do this is to impose their own reality temporarily on a limited area around them. The most common use of possibility energy is to effect rapid healing or create contradictions, allowing higher tech weapons to work in a lower tech realm. It is possible for a character to disconnect from their own reality, through forcing changes with the Reality skill, and actually change physically, into a denizen of the new cosm; from a human into an Elf or caveman for example. They are then considered a native to the laws of the new realm and must alter skills and abilities to fit the new paradigm.

== Notable features ==
Torg is designed to allow players to derive enjoyment from how characters, equipment, and environments of the various realities interact, such as having Terminator-style futuristic cyborgs adventure alongside Dungeons & Dragons–style mages in an Indiana Jones–style pulp setting. It also allows playing a game with an explicitly epic or 'cinematic' overtone (as in Star Wars or Buffy the Vampire Slayer, as opposed to RPGs like Vampire: The Masquerade or Dungeons & Dragons).

Torg uses a unified mechanics system designed to support different fictional settings; character attributes and game mechanics use a shared sliding scale, where the same numerical values can represent different types of measurements, skills, or resources. The game uses a unified method of task resolution involving a 20-sided die.

Torg also features an open-ended die mechanic in which a single twenty-sided die roll is converted into a bonus using a chart. Under certain circumstances, the die may be rolled again, with additional results added to the original roll when a 10 or 20 is rolled. Further modifiers may be gained through spent possibilities, card play, and other game elements, affecting the results of character actions.

The game's backstory involves 'possibility energy', which can be used by Storm Knights to achieve heroic feats. In the game mechanics a spent possibility gives a player a chance to make an additional die roll, potentially leading to greater success. Similarly, an included deck of cards provides bonus rolls or skill points and contains ideas for additional character interaction. Some of these cards can be used instead of Possibility energy. It places an emphasis on groupwork and character interaction by exchange and giving of cards, coordination rules, and the use of "group powers".

At the time of its release Torg's 'Infiniverse' campaign was an ambitious attempt at creating an interactive campaign setting. Subscribers to West End's Infiniverse magazine received response forms, through which they could inform WEG of the progress of their campaigns. Player input actually influenced the campaign setting through a 'rumor' system ('rumors' were introduced in Infiniverse magazines and published adventures, and the majority of responses would determine whether that rumor was 'true' or not). The Infiniverse campaign ran until April 1994.

== Setting ==
The game setting describes a number of different realities, each a different genre, self-contained but with two elements common to all: a Darkness Device and its linked ruler, the High Lord. Together each is an individual cosm with its own four axioms and three World Laws. Each cosm survives by invading other realms and converting them to its reality. The inhabitants of most invaded realms transform into those of the invading cosm, while a few become Storm Knights. Storm Knights are the player characters of Torg. The conversion drains possibility energy which feeds the Darkness Device and High Lord. Earth is an unusual realm rich in possibility energy and the only way to access all of it was to have a number of cosms invade at once. This was organized by The Gaunt Man, High Lord of Orrorsh, the most successful and powerful of the High Lords. Initially six cosms invaded, all are detailed in the Worldbook, then in their own sourcebook.

=== Core Earth ===
A near future Earth with basic magic and religious miracles, and without a Darkness Device and High Lord. Its alternate history has the United States government taken over by a shadowy cabal known as the Delphi Council. Core Earth is detailed in The Delphi Council Worldbook Volume I.

=== The Living Land ===
A primitive, mist-filled Lost World-style jungle that covers two separate areas of North America; a strip on West coast, and a larger area on the east coast. The invading cosm, Takta Ker is home to humanoid dinosaurs called edeinos, ruled by the High Lord Baruk Kaah and its Darkness Device, a huge forest called Rec Pakken. Technology and magic are almost nonexistent, but the inhabitants' religion gives them powerful miracles. The Living Land sourcebook was the first published for Torg in 1990.

=== The Nile Empire ===
A pulp action cosm combined a restored Ancient Egypt that invaded North Africa. It is characterized by 1930s technology working side by side with Egyptian magical astronomy and "weird science" powers and gizmos. Costumed Mystery Men patrolled the alleyways of Cairo. Ruled by Dr. Mobius, also known as Pharaoh Mobius, one of the most devious High Lords. His darkness device was a crocodile-headed idol called Kefertiti. The Nile Empire sourcebook was the second published for Torg in 1990.

=== Aysle ===
Aysle, is a magical cosm with many of the elements of traditional fantasy fiction, including knights, dwarves and dragons. It covers most of the United Kingdom and parts of Scandinavia. Aysle is ruled by the High Lord Pella Ardinary and her Darkness Device, an ornate crown called Drakacanus. High magic and low-technology are the dominant axioms, with Aysle having its own internal war between light and dark. The Aysle sourcebook was the third published for Torg in 1990.

=== The Cyberpapacy ===
Covering France, this is a realm which was initially a repressive, medieval theocracy (that wielded real miracles). En route to Core Earth it melded with a virtual reality and gained cyberpunk technology and attitudes. Ruled by the Cyberpope Jean Malreaux I, his darkness device Ebenuscrux took the shape of a prototypical circuit cross, the symbol of the realm's strange transhumanist version of Gallican Catholicism. This "GodNet" was realm of circuitry and mind, an artificial reality contained within the networked computers of the realm, and stylized as a jazzed-up realm of churches and religious artifacts. Storm Knights unlucky enough to be defeated here could be jacked into the virtual Hell, from which no one ever returned.

=== Nippon Tech ===
An ultra capitalist nightmare society covering most of Japan where lies and betrayal were as common as breathing, and where martial artists, computer hackers, and yakuza fought to bring down the corporate-controlled government. Ruled by 3327, who was assisted by a darkness device named Daikoku that took the form of a laptop computer.

=== Orrorsh ===
A Gothic horror realm ("Orrorsh" is an anagram of "horrors") set in Indonesia where the realm's Victorians considered it their White Man's Burden to protect the natives from the unspeakable monsters roaming the countryside. The greatest enemy in Orrorsh, however, was the enemy within: the realm would attempt to seduce Storm Knights to the side of Wickedness. Originally ruled by the greatest of the High Lords, Lord Byron Salisbury (aka The Gaunt Man) from his sinister holdfast, Illmound Keep. His darkness device, Heketon, took the shape of an enormous human heart. He also possessed a powerful artifact, a mirror named Wicked, that permitted him to gain insight into the Nameless One. Early in the war, the actions of several Storm Knights locked The Gaunt Man into a kind of reality bubble; during this interregnum several monstrous beings known collectively as the Hellion Court ruled in his place.

As the game progressed, more realms were added:

=== The Land Below ===
Not a realm per se but a pocket dimension created as an experiment between the Nile Empire and the Living Lands. This dimension featured primitive tribesmen, giant apes, and hostile native animals, all similar to the Pellucidar and Tarzan books of Edgar Rice Burroughs. Later this dimension intruded upon Core Earth's reality in the eastern United States ("The Land Above"), supplanting some of the Living Lands.

=== Space Gods ===
A high-technology, spacefaring society out of Chariots of the Gods that had visited South America centuries before. The Akashans had their own colonial empire of alien races which could be added to the game at the game master's discretion. This realm introduced advanced biotech and psionics to the Possibility Wars. it also introduced the idea of reality trees, a non-invasive organic device capable of merging two realities without damaging the inhabitants. This realm was not controlled by a High Lord. However, a sentient group-mind virus known as the Comaghaz had infected some percentage of the Akashan population, including one of its highly placed citizens, Sarila, and sought to perpetuate itself. The Akashans have no darkness device or means of creating inter-cosmic portals, but came this cosm through naturally occurring wormholes called stargates; many of them do not even realize they are in a different cosm, thinking they have only found another galaxy.

=== Tharkold ===
The home of a race of magic and technology-using demons that lead a thousand-year war against their world's native human population. Tharkold has been compared to something of a cross between The Terminator and Hellraiser movies. In the game, the Tharkoldu originally planned to invade the Soviet Union, but the Soviet Army defeated them with the help of an Earth psychic. They later established a small realm in Los Angeles, and subsequently took partial control of Berlin, splitting their reality with the New Nile Empire. Ruled by Jezrael, a human slave/soldier who took control after the previous High Lord, the technodemon Kranod, failed in his invasion attempts. The darkness device took the form of a carved rod and was named Malgest.

=== Terra ===
Not an invading realm but rather the home cosm of the invaders from the Nile Empire, this was a more straightforward pulp realm without the ancient Egyptian trappings and magic.

According to the cosmology of Torg, in the beginning each dimension, or cosm, was separate from every other. However, a ravenous entity known as The Nameless One, who fed on the energy of the cosms, created several intelligent machines known as Darkness Devices and scattered them throughout the cosms. Wherever they landed, the Darkness Devices bonded with an inhabitant of the cosm, giving him great power. Those who possessed Darkness Devices were known as High Lords. Through the power of his Darkness Device, a High Lord could rip open a portal to other cosms. By sending an invasion force through the portal, the High Lord could slowly remake the target cosm into a duplicate of his own while concurrently draining the target cosm of its possibility energy. Because the invader's reality remade the physical laws of the beachhead, his armies were much more effective in combat than the target's defense force. For instance, if a low-tech, high-magic cosm invaded a higher-tech cosm, the defenders' guns would stop working while the invaders would have access to spells for which the defenders had no known defense. In this way, invading other cosms provided both new lands to conquer and tremendous power which a High Lord could use to extend his lifespan, give himself new abilities, and even modify the physical laws of his home cosm. Amongst the cosms known in Torg, the most successful and powerful High Lord was The Gaunt Man, High Lord of Orrorsh. He had been invading and destroying other cosms for thousands of years before the game opened. According to the backstory of Torg, the Gaunt Man stumbled across the cosm of Earth in his travels and was astounded by the amount of possibility energy available for the taking. Unfortunately for him, that same amount of energy made it impossible for the Gaunt Man to simply invade Earth as he had so many others; the energy backlash would have overwhelmed his portal. The Gaunt Man therefore began forming alliances with the High Lords of several other worlds. They would all invade Earth near-simultaneously, spreading the energy backlash across all their fronts. This invasion is the setting for the game—each invader brings his own, strikingly different realm to Earth so that different physical locations across the globe also have different laws of reality.

Players could design characters for any of these realms, so a party of adventurers might contain a magician, a cop, a vampyre hunter, a super-hero, a cybernetically-enhanced gunrunner, a dwarf miner, a six-foot dinosaur priest, or a beetle-like alien with a bad temper, and any of these characters might eventually learn sword fighting, kung fu, magic, or net-hacking.

== Game history ==
TORG Revised & Expanded, 2005. Cover by Talon Dunning.

The title was originally an acronym for the in-house development name: The Other Roleplaying Game. Unable to find a better name, the name was adopted as the official name and applied to the game. Names that were considered but rejected include Shadow Wars, Shadow Spawn, Twilight Shadows, and Endless Earth.

Torg initially achieved some success in a saturated market. Reviews (both contemporary to the release of Torg and since then) generally cited the uniqueness of the cinematic elements (e.g., the drama deck), the flexibility of rules system, and the expansiveness of the setting. However, various factors such as poor quality control in new products, a large amount of required game material to purchase, and lack of support from publications outside the WEG studio, meant that by 1994 only a few hardcore fans remained. Various attempted sales of the property and failed attempts at revising and resurrecting the game ensued. In 1995, Omni Gaming Products released the first issue of a new Infiniverse magazine, ignoring many of the series-ending events of WEG's final published adventure War's End in the interest of continuing the game under their own management. This quickly fell through.

By 2004, Torg was again under ownership of West End Games (although WEG itself was under new ownership) and a new version was under development. An announcement by WEG's then-current owner on the official Torg forums explained further:

To that end, we are beginning our "countdown to the new Torg" event at GenCon 2005; at this event we will have at least two products designed for established Torg fans, but which will hopefully be approachable enough for new people who would want to get started in the grandeur of the Torg universe early.

Ultimately, 2005 came and went without the arrival of the new Torg game. Due to expending resources and time to developing and publishing the new D6 games also by WEG (D6 Fantasy, D6 Adventure, & D6 Space), it became necessary to push Torg into 2006. The new release date was to be in the Fall of 2006.

Without giving too much away, this will be the beginning of a grassroots effort to get people excited and thinking about Torg again. Those waiting for next year's second edition will get a well-tested system and a universe ready for multi-genre action, and fans who want to come along for the ride through the coming year will learn more about the secrets and mysteries of the Torg universe than they've ever known before.

In addition to an upcoming second edition ("Torg 2.0"), WEG released Torg Revised & Expanded (dubbed Torg 1.5), in order to invigorate interest among longtime fans and to generate interest in backstock of first edition Torg merchandise. This book was released in May 2005 as a PDF file, and was slated to be released as a limited-edition hardback in June 2005, though the release date was subsequently pushed back to July and finally released in August. A limited run of leftover softcover editions, printed for distribution at the 2005 Origins RPG convention, were also made available on WEG's website. The announced Torg 2.0 was never produced.

== Publications ==
=== Sourcebooks ===
- WEG20501 Torg boxed set, includes Rulebook, Adventure Book, Worldbook, 156 Drama deck cards + 10 blank cards, and 1d20, 1990.
- WEG20505 The Living Land, sourcebook and adventures in a lost world realm, 1990.
- WEG20506 The Nile Empire, sourcebook and adventures in a pulp fiction age, 1990.
- WEG20507 Aysle, sourcebook and adventures in the fantasy realm, 1990.
- WEG20508 Cyberpapacy, sourcebook and adventures during a Cyberpunk inquisition, 1990.
- WEG20509 Nippon Tech, sourcebook and adventures in Manga espionage run Japan, 1991.
- WEG20510 Orrorsh, sourcebook and adventures in the Horror realm, 1991.
- WEG20511 Space Gods, sourcebook and adventures in a future Aztech biotech reality, 1991.
- WEG20512 Tharkold, sourcebook and adventures of the demoniac techno-horror Hellraiser kind, 1992.
- WEG20513 The Delphi Council, Worldbook Volume 1, sourcebook and adventures in a sundered core Earth, 1992.
- WEG20515 Terra, sourcebook and adventures in the pulp heroic world that spawned the Nile Empire, 1994.

=== Supplement ===
- WEG20556 The GodNet, new rules locations and equipment for Cyberpapacy's virtual reality, 1991.
- WEG20559 Pixaud's Practical Grimoire, new spells, indexes and revisions to the Magic system, 1991.
- WEG20560 Kanawa Personal Weapons, list of various light weapons with descriptions and statistics, 1991.
- WEG20562 The Land Below, rules, maps and adventures in the fringe reality beneath the realms, 1991.
- WEG20564 Kanawa Heavy Weapons, list of various heavy weapons with descriptions and statistics, 1991.
- WEG20570 Creatures of Aysle, description and stats of various creatures in Aysle, 1991.
- WEG20577 Ravagons, details on the realm and playing of Ravagons, 1991.
- WEG20567 Kanawa Land Vehicles, list of various vehicles with descriptions and statistics, 1992.
- WEG20568 Infiniverse Campaign Game Update Volume I, update on the first 18 months of the Infiniverse, 1992.
- WEG20569 The Storm Knights' Guide to the Possibility Wars, 1992.
- WEG20570 Los Angeles, Citybook, characters and adventures in Los Angeles, 1992.
- WEG20574 Creatures of Orrorsh, description and stats of various creatures in Orrorsh, 1992.
- WEG20575 Creatures of Tharkold, description and stats of various creatures in Tharkold, 1993.
- WEG20571 Character Collection, ready made characters, 1993.
- WEG20582 Infiniverse Campaign Game Update Volume II, update on the third year of the Infiniverse, 1993.
- WEG20585 The High Lords' Guide to the Possibility Wars, 1993.
- WEG20523 Tokyo, Citybook, characters and adventures in Tokyo, 1993.
- WEG20586 Clerics, an exploration of religion in the realms, 1994.
- WEG20587 Infiniverse Campaign Game Update Volume III, update on the fourth year of the Infiniverse, 1994.
- WEG20525 Berlin, Citybook, characters and adventures in Berlin, 1995.

=== Adventures ===
- WEG20501 The Lizard and the Lightning, choose-your-own adventure included in Rulebook, 1990.
- WEG20551 The Destiny Map, gamemaster screen and part 1 of the Relics of Power adventure trilogy, 1990.
- WEG20552 The Possibility Chalice, part 2 of the Relics of Power adventure trilogy, 1990.
- WEG20553 The Forever City, part 3 of the Relics of Power adventure trilogy, 1990.
- WEG20554 The Cassandra Files, a host of adventures from the secret files of the Delphi council, 1990.
- WEG20555 Queenswrath, adventures in Aysle, 1990.
- WEG20557 The High Lord of Earth, the battle for Core Earths reality, 1991.
- WEG20558 Full Moon Draw, adventures across the six realms, 1991.
- WEG20561 Operation - Hard Sell, espionage in Nippon and the Living Land, 1991.
- WEG20563 The Crucible of Pain, mureder maddness and mayhem in the six realms, 1991.
- WEG20565 City of Deamons, Earth is besieged by beings from another realities, 1992.
- WEG20566 Cylent Scream, adventures in the six realms, 1991.
- WEG20572 The Temple of Rec Stalek, an adventure in the Living Land, 1992.
- WEG20573 Central Valley Gate, relieve a small California town of 3 invading realms, 1992.
- WEG20580 When Axioms Collide, save the GodNet from an Orroshian nightmare, 1992.
- WEG20581 the Gaunt Man Returns, travel the realms to stop the Gaunt Man, 1992.
- WEG20578 No Quarter Given, enter Orrorsh to defeat a competing group of adventurers, 1993.
- WEG20590 Wars End, how will the reality war end, you decide, 1995.

== Torg: Eternity ==
When West End Games ceased operations in July 2010, Torg was sold to a German game company, Ulisses Spiele. The July 31, 2014, email newsletter from DriveThruRPG announced that Ulisses Spiele were planning new Torg titles for 2015. Meanwhile, the company had made most of the back catalog available for purchase as PDF downloads in their webstore, aside from the original boxed set.

In 2016 Ulisses Spiele announced that new edition would be released in 2017 under the title, Torg: Eternity.

Ulisses Spiele started a Kickstarter on May 31, 2017, for the new edition of Torg, named "Torg Eternity". The Kickstarter succeeded, generating $355,992 against a goal of $8,000.

Ulisses Spiele continued to run Kickstarters for the release of additional sourcebooks. Early setting changes included the renaming of Nippon Tech to Pan-Pacifica, and Tharkold's permanent arrival in Russia as part of the original invasion of the cosm.

=== Sourcebooks ===
The following core sourcebooks have been produced to date.

- UNA10000 Core Rules (2017), ISBN 9783957526830
- UNA10020 The Living Land
- UNA10045 The Nile Empire
- UNA10058 Ruins of the Living Land
- US82017 Aysle
- US82039 The Cyberpapacy
- US82058 Heroes of the Possibility Wars Volume 1
- US82065 Tharkold
- US82112 Orrorsh
- US82129 Pan-Pacifica

=== Adventures ===
The following supplements have been produced to date.

- UNA10004 Day One (2017), ISBN 9783957526861
- UNA10007 Delphi Missions - Rising Storm (2017), ISBN 9783957529091
- UNA10022 The God Box
- UNA10024 Delphi Missions - Living Land
- UNA10047 The Fires of Ra
- UNA10049 Delphi Missions - Nile Empire
- US82021 Revenge of the Carredon
- US82022 Delphi Missions - Aysle
- US82034 When Cosms Collide
- US82043 Unhallowed Data
- US82044 Delphi Missions - Cyberpapacy
- US82056 Relics of Power Redux
- US28067 Blood on the Blasted Lands
- US82068 Delphi Missions - Tharkold
- US82131 Operation: Soft Sell
- US82132 Delphi Missions - Pan-Pacifica

== Drawbacks ==
While the breadth of Torg was one of its most exciting features, it could also cause significant problems. Because the scope of the game was so broad, and it incorporated such a wide variety of skills, the game became unwieldy to some players. Further, in some cases simple rules given in the basic set were thrown out or expanded in sourcebooks, so that players moving between campaigns sometimes found the rules were not what they were used to; even some of the character templates from the boxed set were not completely compatible with the rules in the sourcebook for their home cosm. This breadth of scope also served to ratchet up the game's expense: each of the game's realms was detailed in its own sourcebook, and those sourcebooks included rules that were not covered in the main rulebook. For instance, if a character wanted to build his own magic spells, the player needed to own (or at least have access to) the Aysle sourcebook. Likewise, psionics were covered in the Space Gods sourcebook, martial arts in the Nippon Tech book, pulp powers and gizmos in The Nile Empire and Terra sourcebooks, and cyberware/bionics in the Cyberpapacy's. Note, however, that if a Cyberpapacy character wanted to hack the GodNet, they needed yet another supplement for those rules. While this allowed a group to take their game in any direction they wished, it made it difficult to keep up with all the rules. This is especially true because long-term campaigns tend to lead to cross-genre characters, such as mages with cybernetics, or espionage agents who learned the Occult. It reached a point where even published adventures would forget, ignore, or skim over previously established rules.

Successive materials suffered from power creep: as more books were released, the rules and equipment tended to escalate the relative level of power available to player characters and NPCs alike. The Living Lands Sourcebook, while initially formidable, was soon superseded by advanced alien weaponry, more powerful miracles, cybernetics, occult magic, and psionics published in subsequent books.

The later material displayed a penchant for humor, often at the cost of breaking the mood. The edeinos of the Living Lands proved a popular target, transforming to other realities and becoming among other things "Skippy the Edeinos" (who in the campaign setting came complete with an action figure), a Nile Empire "Rocket Ranger" named Captain Verdigris, and an Elvis impersonator. Supplements such as The High Lords Guide to the Possibility Wars went so far as to address this issue and advise readers to read the original material on edeinos to make them more dangerous/serious and ignore the trend WEG had itself established. The Nile Empire also often slipped from the genre of pulp heroes into outright self-referential parody. For example, Nile Empire ninja engaged in elaborate martial art moves and high-pitched battle cries, compared to their stealthy Nippon Tech counterparts who would mock them. Scene titles in the published adventures were often elaborate puns, and there was a Five Realms role-playing game-within-the-game where the author Jeff Mills was a parody of game designer Greg Gorden, and who eventually went on to help save the world in the final published adventure, War's End.

One advantage of the game was that with a virtual army of "Storm Knights", player characters could be fit in to anywhere on the planet. However, this led to a huge "supporting cast" of characters. The initial characters featured in the first trilogy of novels were implied to have great destinies but for the most part slid into obscurity. Individual writers and artists had their own preferred cast of characters they featured in the published supplements, novels, and adventures they worked on. One supplement, the Character Collection, featured a contest of reader submissions for best characters. The five winners were then incorporated into a subsequent published adventure. The result was an overly large cast of characters where no one individual or group made an impression or could be identified as the primary identifiable characters of the game.

Another problem stemmed from the fact that visiting other realms meant travelling to geographic locations and cultures with which many players and gamemasters were not familiar. For example, there is a specific reference to 1930s gangsters "with an Arab slant", though most players simply did not know how to give such a "slant". Similarly, a lot of references were made to the culture clash between the Victorians and Indonesians, without specific information. In practice, this tended to be ignored in the game's own adventure modules, despite the vague references to culture in the rules books. Also, as not surprising for a U.S. game aimed at U.S. customers, Torg was highly U.S.-centric. At one time or another every invading cosm except one occupied part of the United States, and most of the real-world political focus was on the U.S. government, which was taken over in a political coup by a fascist Senator. Four of the ten book-length adventure modules were set in the United States, with three of those (City of Demons, Operation: Hard Sell, Central Valley Gate) set in California. The final major act of the concluding adventure, War's End, was also set in California.

Finally, in some quarters the game was criticized for its alleged anti-Japanese sentiment, as the Nippon Tech realm played into many of the fears and concerns of Japanese business dominating the U.S. industries in the late 1980s/early 1990s. The portrayal of the Cyberpapacy provoked claims of anti-Catholicism as well with its papacy that among other things spread an artificial AIDS virus. It has to be said that within the game it was actually the Core Earth Japanese and Catholics who were "good guys" fighting evil invaders who embodied these stereotypes. However, that distinction was often lost upon many, and WEG did heavily promote these stereotypical elements in their gaming products even while attributing them to fictional invaders.

== Reception ==
Stewart Wieck reviewed Torg in White Wolf #21 (June/July 1990), rating it a 5 out of 5 and stated that "In conclusion, I can only say that Torg receives my highest possible recommendation. This game is going to set a standard which may remain unequaled for a long time. The emphasis on storytelling, fun mechanics, and an engrossing setting combine to create a nearly unbeatable RPG experience."

In the July 1990 edition of Games International (Issue 16), Paul Mason found the combat mechanics fairly pedestrian, saying, "All that can be said of this is that it is serviceable and not overly complex." He also found that "the artwork is weak for a product of this prestige." He concluded, "the game reminds me just a little too much of Pacesetter's doomed introductory product Sandman, which featured a similar heady, eclectic blend."

In the February 1991 edition of Dragon (Issue 166), Jim Bambra liked the multi-genre aspect of the game, in which players could be immersed in a medieval fantasy London one session and in a cyberpunk Paris the next. He also liked the quick resolution for skill checks and combat; although it did require some table checking, it was fast and adaptable. He noted that magic and healing were "neatly handled and fit into the system with a minimum of fuss." Bambra criticized the varying quality of the rules, saying, "some places are very clear, but re-readings are needed to grasp to what is being said in other areas." He also found the quality of artwork varied greatly. Overall, Bambra thought Torg was "a major addition to the role-playing games currently available."

In the July 1992 edition of Dragon (Issue 183), Martin Wixted called Torg "one of the most gripping role-playing games I have ever encountered." However, he cautioned that it was "not for the rule-dependent gamer."

In the August 1992 edition of Dragon (Issue 184), Rick Swan reviewed Tharkold, a supplement describing the demons invading Los Angeles. Of Tharkold, Swan said that West End designers "have hit their stride". He noted that "absent in previous TORG products but delightfully present here is an undercurrent of black humor."

In a retrospective review of Torg in Black Gate, Matthew David Surridge said "The possibility energy that made the player characters heroes was, in essence, imagination. Torg, as a game, was literally driven by imagination on numerous different levels."

In his 2023 book Monsters, Aliens, and Holes in the Ground, RPG historian Stu Horvath noted, "[The game's] expansive possibilities both make Torg attractive to players and stifle its playability." Horvath pointed out that players needed to purchase a new sourcebook for each of the separate regions of Torg, saying "Seemingly every new Torg book introduced a new system, decentralizing the game's mechanics and raising the overall power level. Coupled with the rapidly advancing metaplot, Torg was expensive to jump into and dizzying to keep up with." Horvath also found "The production values are also surprisingly low. The boxed set is adequate, but many subsequent books have inferior illustrations, which distinctly disadvantage Torg when compared to the strong aesthetics of Rifts and Shadowrun.

== Reviews ==
- Challenge #44 (1990)
- Review in Shadis #8
