= Valkyrie (magazine) =

- Categories: Role-playing magazine
- Frequency: Quarterly
- Founded: 1994
- Final issue Number: 2003; 28
- Company: Partizan Press
- Country: UK

Valkyrie is a UK role-playing magazine that was published between 1994 and 2003.

== Publication history ==
The magazine was started in 1994. Angus Abranson was one of the people involved in the creation of Valkyrie, and continued to report news for the magazine while he was working at Leisure Games. It was published by Partizan Press and edited originally by David "Stig" Renton (original editor of Role Player Independent) and then taken over by Jay Forster. Renton held the post from 1994 to 1998 and Forster from 1999 to 2003.

Some claimed that it was the successor to White Dwarf amongst the UK role-playing community, with numerous contributors from across the hobby, including Phil Masters and Marcus Rowland.

The magazine was resurrected as a quarterly with issue 19 and ran for several years before ceasing publication with issue 28. It folded in 2003.

On 15 September 2019, the first edition of an all new Valkyrie magazine was launched in 2019, but its ownership, contents, style and target market are completely different. In other words, apart from the name, the new magazine has nothing to do with the original.
