= S. John Ross (game designer) =

American game designer

- Born: Samuel John Ross Jr. Cumberland, Maryland, U.S.
- Occupations: Writer, game designer, graphic artist
- Spouse: Sandra Ross
- Writing career
- Period: 1990-
- Genres: Discordianism, Role-playing games, fantasy, wargames

Samuel John Ross Jr. known as S. John Ross, is an American designer and owner of Cumberland Games & Diversions. He wrote the early indie role-playing game Risus: The Anything RPG.

== Career ==
Ross began his professional writing career in 1990, writing role-playing material for Avalon Hill, Flying Buffalo, Guardians of Order, Last Unicorn Games, Steve Jackson Games, TSR, West End Games, White Wolf, and Wizards of the Coast in addition to his own company, Cumberland Games & Diversions.

Ross designed Uresia: Grave of Heaven (2003) as an original setting published for the Big Eyes, Small Mouth role-playing game; it was similar to the style of Swords & Sorcery anime. Ross created Risus: The Anything RPG and Sparks paper miniatures. He also created the retro-science fiction-fantasy role-playing game Encounter Critical, and maintains the All-Systems Library.

His fonts have appeared on television, books and billboards. They have been used by Anheuser-Busch, Atheist Bus Campaign, Comedy Central, Disney Italy, Office Depot, Penguin Books and Ariane Sherine.

In Discordianism, he wrote Novus Ordo Discordia, the Gospel of St. Pesher the Gardener, which was included in Apocrypha Discordia, and the "foreplay" or foreword for Ek-sen-trik-kuh Discordia: The Tales of Shamlicht., both under the name Patriarch Wilhelm Leonardo Pesher-Principle.

He was nominated for an Origins Award for a short stint as editor of Pyramid magazine, and was named to the Order of the Pineapple along with author Adam Gorightly in 2013. Risus 1.5 was named Best Free RPG at RPGnet in 2001 and he contributed to Pulp Hero which received a Silver ENnie for Best Writing in 2006.

Ross has been a named guest at several conventions including Technicon in 1995, 1997, and 1998; A-Kon in 2004 and 2009; and Starland Gamefest in 2013. Ross was a special guest at GameFest held in May 2014.

== Personal life ==
S. John Ross was born to Sam and Donna Ross and his full name is Samuel John Ross Jr. While he lived in various parts of the United States and in Japan, as of early 2014 he lived in Denver, Colorado, with his wife Sandra Ross.

== Works ==
S. John Ross wrote these works:

- GURPS Russia as well as GURPS Warehouse 23 published by Steve Jackson Games (also, co-authored GURPS Grimoire and GURPS Black Ops)
- Among the Clans: The Andorians as well as the Star Trek Narrator's Toolkit published by Last Unicorn Games
- Uresia: Grave of Heaven published by Guardians of Order
- Encounter Critical, originally published as hoax purportedly designed in the 70s.
- Risus: The Anything RPG and Points in Space published by Cumberland Games & Diversions
- The Pokethulhu Adventure Game published by Squishy Brain Games
- Treasures of a Slaver's Kingdom which won the XYZZY Award 2007 for the best NPC
- “The Big List of RPG Plots”

Ross worked as the editor and developer on The Silicon Valley Tarot, as well as the 2nd Edition of the game Murphy's Rules.

Ross is the owner as well as the creator of the web-based electronic publisher Cumberland Games and Diversions, which specializes in documents for games as well as TrueType fonts.
