= Earthdawn =

Tabletop fantasy role-playing game

- Gamemaster's Compendium, RedBrick edition
- Designers: Greg Gorden
- Publishers: FASA (First Edition); Living Room Games (Second Edition); RedBrick (Classic, Third, Revised Third Editions); FASA (Fourth Edition); Vagrant Workshop (Age of Legend Edition)
- Publication: 1993 (First Edition); 2001 (Second Edition); 2005 (Classic Edition); 2009 (Third Edition); 2012 (Revised Third Edition); 2015 (Fourth Edition); 2016 (Age of Legend Edition)
- Genres: Fantasy
- Systems: Step System; Freeform Universal

Earthdawn is a fantasy role-playing game, originally produced by FASA in 1993. In 1999 it was licensed to Living Room Games, which produced the Second Edition. It was licensed to RedBrick in 2003, who released the Classic Edition in 2005 and the game's Third Edition in 2009 (the latter through Mongoose Publishing's Flaming Cobra imprint). The license is now held by FASA Games, Inc. (from FASA), who have released the Fourth Edition, with updated mechanics and an advanced metaplot timeline. Vagrant Workshop released the Age of Legend edition in 2016 using alternative rules-lite mechanics.

The game is similar to fantasy games like Dungeons & Dragons, but draws more inspiration from games like RuneQuest. The rules of the game are tightly bound to the underlying magical metaphysics, with the goal of creating a rich, logical fantasy world. Like many role-playing games from the nineties, Earthdawn focuses much of its detail on its setting, a province called Barsaive. It was also originally written as a prequel to Shadowrun, mirroring its setting of returning magic with one where magic has just recently dropped from its peak. However, after Shadowrun was licensed out to a different publisher, the ties between the two were deliberately severed.

== History ==
Between 1993 and 1999, FASA released over 20 gaming supplements for Earthdawn, and several novels and short-story anthologies. In late 1999, FASA granted Living Room Games a licensing agreement to produce new material for the game.

The second edition did not alter the setting, though it did update the timeline to include events that took place in Barsaive. There were a few changes to the rules in the second edition; some classes were slightly different or altered abilities from the original. The changes were meant to allow for more rounded characters and better balance of play. Living Room Games' last publication was in 2005 and they no longer have an Earthdawn license.

In 2003 a license was granted to RedBrick, who released the original FASA books in PDF form, and developed their own edition based on the FASA products. They published the Earthdawn Classic Player's Compendium and the Earthdawn Classic Gamemaster's Compendium which are compatible with the original FASA publications. Each book has 524 pages and summarizes much of what FASA published; game mechanics, setting, narrations, and stories. Errata was incorporated into the text and provided rules clarifications.

While RedBrick tried to remain faithful to FASA's vision and visual style, they revised almost everything and introduced new material to fill the gaps. RedBrick published new Earthdawn novels in 2007. In 2009, RedBrick announced the third edition of the game, and published it through Mongoose Publishing's Flaming Cobra imprint. The first two books were released in July 2009. In 2012, RedBrick announced the return of the Earthdawn license to FASA Games, Inc.

In 2014, FASA announced the Earthdawn fourth edition and launched a successful Kickstarter to support the project. The fourth edition is described as a reworking of the game mechanics, with redundancies eliminated, and a simpler success level system. The game world is advanced five years, past the end of the Barsaive-Thera War. The first Fourth Edition title—the Player's Guide—was released in early 2015. In 2014, FASA gave permission for Impact Miniatures to return the original Heartbreaker Hobbies & Games Official Earthdawn Miniatures range to production. In order to fund this, Impact Miniatures launched a successful Kickstarter project.

In 2016, Vagrant Workshop released the Age of Legend edition using a permutation of the rules-lite mechanics of the Freeform Universal RPG system. With its rules-lite mechanics the Age of Legend edition is marketed as being "ideal for one-shots, convention games, and introductory games — even for kids!"

== Setting ==
In Barsaive, magic is cyclical. As the magic level rises, it allows aliens called Horrors to cross from their distant, otherworldly dimension into ours. The Horrors come in a large variety—from simple eating machines that devour all they encounter, to intelligent and cunning foes that feed off the negative emotions they inspire in their prey.

In the distant past of Earthdawn's setting, an elf scholar discovered that the time of the Horrors was approaching, and founded the Eternal Library in order to discover a way to defeat them — or at the very least, survive them. The community that grew up around the library developed wards and protections against the Horrors, which they traded to other lands and eventually became the powerful Theran Empire, an extremely magically advanced civilization and the main antagonist of the Earthdawn setting.

The peoples of the world built kaers, underground towns and cities, which they sealed with the Theran wards to wait out the time of the Horrors, which was called the Scourge. Theran wizards and politicians warned many of the outlying nations around Thera of the coming of the Horrors, offering the protection of the kaers to those who would pledge their loyalty to the Empire. Most of these nations agreed at first though some became unwilling to fulfill their end of the bargain after the end of the Scourge, wanting to have nothing to do with the bureaucratic nation run on political conflict and powered by slavery. After four hundred years of hiding, the Scourge ended, and the people emerged to a world changed by the Horrors. The player characters explore this new world, discovering lost secrets of the past, and fighting Horrors that remain.

The primary setting of Earthdawn is Barsaive, a former province of the Theran Empire. Barsaive is a region of city-states, independent from the Therans since the dwarven Kingdom of Throal led a rebellion against their former overlords. The Theran presence in Barsaive has been limited to a small part of south-western Barsaive, located around the magical fortress of Sky Point and the city of Vivane.

The setting of Earthdawn is the same world as Shadowrun (i.e. a fictionalized version of Earth), but takes place millennia earlier. The map of Barsaive and its neighboring regions established that most of the game takes place where Ukraine and Russia are in our world. However, the topography other than coastlines and major rivers is quite different, and the only apparent reference to the real world besides the map may be the Blood Wood, known as "Wyrm Wood" before the Scourge and similar in location and extent to the Chernobyl (Ukrainian for "wormwood") zone of alienation. Note should be made that game world links between Earthdawn and Shadowrun were deliberately broken by the publisher when the Shadowrun property was licensed out, in order to avoid the necessity for coordination between publishing companies. FASA has announced since then, that there are no plans to return Shadowrun to in-house publication, nor to restore the links between the game worlds.

Three Earthdawn supplements cover territories outside Barsaive. The Theran Empire book (First Edition) covers the Theran Empire and its provinces (which roughly correspond to the territories of the Roman Empire, plus colonies in America and India). Cathay: The Five Kingdoms (Third Edition) covers the lands of Cathay (Far East).Vasgothia (Fourth Edition) covers the Theran Province in more detail than originally presented in First Edition (Germany).

=== Races ===
Known as Namegivers, the setting of Earthdawn features several fantasy races for characters and NPCs:

1. Dwarf: Dwarfs in Earthdawn are similar in appearance to the classic D&D or Tolkien dwarfs. They are the predominant race in Barsaive, and the dwarf language is considered the common language. Their culture, especially of the dominant Throal Kingdom, can be considered more of a Renaissance-level culture than in most other fantasy settings, and forms the main source of resistance to a return of Thera's rule in Barsaive.
2. Elf: Elves in Earthdawn fit the common fantasy role playing convention; they are tall, lithe, pointy-eared humanoids who prefer living in nature. Elves in Earthdawn naturally live a very long time; some are thought to be immortal. Such immortal Elves feature in many cross-pollinated storylines with Shadowrun. A subrace of Earthdawn elves are called the Blood Elves. The blood elves rejected the Theran protective magic, and attempted their own warding spells. These wards failed, and a last-ditch ritual caused thorns to thrust through the skin of the blood elves. These ever-bleeding wounds caused constant pain, but the self-inflicted suffering was enough to protect the blood elves from the worst of the Horrors.
3. Human: Humans in Earthdawn are physically similar to humans in our own real world. Human adepts are granted a special Versatility talent to make them more mechanically appealing. Humans in Earthdawn are considered to be somewhat warlike in general outlook.
4. Obsidiman: Obsidimen are a race of large, rock-based humanoids. They stand over 7 feet (2.1 m) tall and weigh over 900 pounds. Their primary connection is to their Liferock, which is a large formation of stone that they emerge from. Obsidimen are loyal to the community around their Liferock, and eventually return to and re-merge with it. Obsidimen can live around 500 years away from their Liferock, and their ultimate lifespan is unknown, as they generally return to it and remain there. Due to their rocky nature and long lives, Obsidimen are rather slow moving and deliberate in both speech and action, and can have difficulty understanding the smaller races' need for haste. However, if aroused by a threat to self, friend, or community, obsidimen are fearsome to behold.
5. Ork: The ork race in Earthdawn is physically similar to other depictions of orcs in fantasy role-playing. They are tribal, nomadic and often barbaric humanoids, with olive, tan, beige or ebony skin. They are relatively short-lived, and as a result many attempt to leave a legacy marked by a memorable death—preferably one that leaves no corpse. Before the Scourge, almost all orks were enslaved by other races.
6. Troll: The troll race in Earthdawn is also similar in appearance to many other fantasy role-playing depictions of trolls. They are very tall humanoids, with hardened skin and horns. Socially, they form clans to which they are fiercely loyal. Troll clans often raid one another, and a significant subset of the troll race are crystal raiders, commanding many of the airships of Barsaive. Other trolls, known as lowland trolls, have merged with mixed communities around Barsaive, although most retain the fierce cultural and personal pride of their less-civilized cousins.
7. T'skrang: The t'skrang are lizard-like, amphibious humanoids with long tails and a flair for the dramatic. Many of them exhibit the behaviors and characteristics stereotypical of a "swashbuckler". T'skrang are often sailors, and many t'skrang families run ships up and down the rivers of Barsaive. A rare subrace of t'skrang, the k'stulaami, possess a flap of skin much like a flying squirrel's patagium, allowing them to glide. While k'stulaami can be born as a random mutation in any t'skrang line, they tend to congregate into communities filled with their own kind.
8. Windling: The windlings are small, winged humanoids; similar to many depictions of fae creatures, they resemble one- to two-foot-tall elves with dragonfly-like wings. They can see into the astral plane, and are considerably luckier than the other races. Windlings are often somewhat mischievous, hedonistic, and eager for new experiences, and are culturally similar to the Kender of Krynn, but without the same kleptomaniacal tendencies.
9. Leafer: A race native to the Dark Forest of Vasgothia, leafers are sentient plant people.
10. Ulkmen: Another race unique to Vasgothia, the ulkmen have been merged with Horrors. In addition to their talents, ulkman adepts gain a Horror power every four Circles. Despite their origins and horrific appearance, the ulkmen are a largely peaceful people.
11. Jubruq: The only 'half-race' in Earthdawn, jubruq are half human or ork and half elemental spirit. They are native to the Sufik tribes of Marak.
12. Jackelmen: Native to Creana, jackalmen have human bodies and jackal heads. They are a warrior people and are thought to practice cannibalism.
13. Gar: An elf-like race with a considerably shorter lifespan, primarily due to their violent lifestyle and high rate of infant mortality. While native to the Cathay region, they have mostly been driven out and live around the outskirts of the Five Kingdoms. A Gar's primary loyalty is to their tribe, with personal glory being a close second.
14. Ki Mao: The Ki Mao are another elven race native to the Cathay region that inhabit the Jungle of Endless Wandering. One distinguishing characteristic setting the Ki Mao apart from their elven cousins is their uncanny resemblance to tigers. They have cat-like eyes and striped patterning along their bodies which resembles tiger stripes.
15. Po Na: Also found in the Jungle of Endless Wandering, the Po Na are a humanoid race with long, prehensile tails and faces that resemble a cross between a monkey and a human. Po Na tend to be driven heavily by curiosity and admire quick wit and word play, engaging in verbal jousts as a type of sport.
16. Storm Children: At first glance they appear to be abnormally pale humans with solid black hair; their eyes, a solid bluish white without pupils, are a strikingly inhuman-looking. The Storm Children are born during particularly terrible storms where a lightning bolt will strike the earth leaving behind a naked, genderless, fully-grown humanoid. They are born knowing Cathayan and are driven by a ravenous hunger for knowledge, but for the most part they are subject to the same merits and vices as every other race.

== Game mechanics ==
The Earthdawn Companion second edition cover shows Throal, the capital of Barsaive

Earthdawn has a unique approach to skill tests. Players wanting to perform an action determine their level or "step" for the skill, talent, or ability to be used. This step can then be looked up in a list of dice to be thrown; it is the next-highest integer of the average roll of the dice(s) in question. For example, two six-sided dice will on average yield a result of 7 (due to the bonus dice mechanic it is 8.4, thus the step number 8 means that 2d6 will be rolled. The consequence is that each such dice roll has a 50% chance of yielding a result at least as high as the corresponding step number.

The result of each die is added (dice which reach their maximum value are thrown again, adding each maximum to the tally, along with the final result below maximum) and compared to a value decided by the game master/storyteller according to the difficulty of the task. This approach means it is always technically possible to succeed with a low step number, yet leaves room for failure on high step numbers. This will sometimes make combat last longer than in other games. As per the above, the difficulty value where the odds of success are perfectly even is identical to the step number.

The third edition changed this by removing d4s and d20s from the system. Steps 6 through 12 (as listed above) form the basis of a 7-Step cycle. To add 7 Steps from then on, simply add 1d12.

The fourth edition change this by making Steps 8 through 18 form the basis of an 11-Step cycle. To form Steps 19–29, add 1d20. To form Steps 30–41, add 2d20, and so on.

The Age of Legend edition departed from the Step System mechanics of previous Earthdawn editions and instead uses a permutation of the rules-lite mechanics of the Freeform Universal RPG system by Nathan Russell. In the Age of Legend permutation a six-sided die ("d6") is used with "but..." and "and..." situational modifiers added to four of the six die faces, and conditionally up to six additional Fudge dice of two differing colors which can alter the initial result of the main d6 die. (Alternatively, the Age of Legend edition can be played with just seven standard d6 dice, ideally of three differing colors.) Dice rolls in the Age of Legend edition answer closed yes–no questions, with the default question being "Do you get what you want?" subsequent to a character's attempt to elicit a desired outcome.

== Reception ==
Stewart Wieck reviewed Earthdawn in White Wolf #37 (July/Aug. 1993), rating it a 3 out of 5 and stated that "Earthdawn is a solid game, but the 'innovations' seem like unnecessary complications. The world is fun, but not fresh. This is not the fantasy game to leave your current campaign for unless you want to bank on the ever-fulfilled FASA promise - an extensive line of support material, much of which will be very good and will undoubtedly add a lot to the game."

Chris W. McCubbin reviewed Earthdawn in Pyramid #3 (Sept./Oct. 1993), and stated that "Although it never becomes bogged down in cliches and avoids outmoded concepts, Earthdawn is, at heart, a very traditional heroic fantasy RPG."

In the February 1994 edition of Dragon (Issue 202), Rick Swan liked the high production values "highlighted by striking illustrations and FASA’s usual state-of-the-art graphics", and found that "Thanks to clear writing and sensible organization... it's an easy read." But Swan also found the game setting insubstantial compared to others. "Despite workable rules and a clever setting, Earthdawn is more frosting than cake, with little of substance to distinguish it from the competition." Nevertheless, he found himself drawn to the game. "In a greasy pizza, let’s-not-take-this-too-seriously kind of way, Earthdawn holds its own."

In a 1996 reader poll conducted by Arcane magazine to determine the 50 most popular roleplaying games of all time, Earthdawn was ranked 24th. Editor Paul Pettengale commented: "Very good indeed. Earthdawn combined traditional fantasy with Call of Cthulhu-style horror and a detailed background to create an evocative and interesting setting. Combined with a clear, well-designed rules system and an impressive range of supporting supplements and adventures, this is an excellent fantasy game. It's also of special interest to fans of Shadowrun, because it describes the past of the same gameworld."

In 1999 Pyramid magazine named Earthdawn as one of The Millennium's Most Underrated Games. Editor Scott Haring noted (referring to the FASA edition) that "Earthdawn had an original, inventive magic system (no mean trick given the hundreds of fantasy RPGs that came before), and a game world that gave you the classic "monsters and dungeons" sort of RPG experience, but made sense doing it."

In Issue 12 of the Australian game magazine Australian Realms, Malcolm Adler thought the rules would satisfy both new and experienced players: "The rules are written in a simple enough form and with plenty of examples so that a new gamer should not get lost. For more experienced gamers there is enough depth in the system to keep the average player happy." Adler liked the ability of gamemasters to go in new directions, saying, "One of the biggest positives on Earthdawn's side is the continual encouragement to do with it what you will." Adler concluded, "My opinion is that the game is going to be big. I suspect the second biggest RPG in the market is about to arrive. Consequently you owe it to yourself to check it out when it becomes available in August. Give it a good look over and then make your own judgement."

In his 2023 book Monsters, Aliens, and Holes in the Ground, RPG historian Stu Horvath noted, "In a fantasy world, one of the most difficult tasks is conveying that sense of the fantastic. The design of Earthdawn, through its careful presentation in both art and text, gives players the necessary details to bring to life a world of wonders as easily as they might conjure a game set in the real world. Once there, players can go forth and forge their own legends."

== Other reviews and commentary ==
- Shadis #10 (Dec. 1993)
- Shadis #24 (Feb. 1996)
- Pyramid – Second Edition
- Rollespilsmagasinet Fønix (Danish) (Issue 1 – March/April 1994)
- Envoyer (German) (Issue 62 – Dec 2001)
- Backstab #33
