= List of Fading Suns books =

This is a list of sourcebooks and expansions for the Fading Suns role-playing game.

== Sourcebooks ==
Victory Point System:

- 1996 First Edition Rulebook, ISBN 978-1-888906-00-4 (OOP)
- 1996 Gamemasters Screen First Edition, ISBN 978-1-888906-01-1 (OOP)
- 1996 Forbidden Lore: Technology, ISBN 978-1-888906-03-5
- 1996 Byzantium Secundus, ISBN 978-1-888906-02-8
- 1997 Players Companion, ISBN 978-1-888906-07-3
- 1997 Lords of the Known Worlds, ISBN 978-1-888906-11-0 (OOP)
- 1997 The Dark between the Stars, ISBN 978-1-888906-08-0
- 1997 Merchants of the Jumpweb, ISBN 978-1-888906-09-7
- 1997 Weird Places, ISBN 978-1-888906-05-9
- 1997 Priests of the Celestial Sun, ISBN 978-1-888906-06-6 (OOP)
- 1998 Children of the Gods, ISBN 978-1-888906-10-3
- 1998 Sinners & Saints, ISBN 978-1-888906-04-2
- 1999 Second Edition Rulebook, ISBN 1-888906-18-9 (OOP)
- 1999 Gamemaster's Screen and Complete Pandemonium, ISBN 978-1-888906-19-6
- 1999 Legions of the Empire, ISBN 978-1-888906-16-5
- 1999 Imperial Survey 1: Hawkwood Fiefs, 1-888906-15-4 (OOP)
- 1999 Imperial Survey 2: al Malik Fiefs, ISBN 978-1-888906-17-2
- 1999 War in the Heavens: Lifeweb, ISBN 1-888906-12-X
- 2000 Star Crusade, ISBN 978-1-888906-20-2
- 2000 War in the Heavens 2: Hegemony, ISBN 978-1-888906-25-7
- 2000 Imperial Survey 3: Hazat Fiefs, ISBN 978-1-888906-22-6
- 2001 Alien Expeditions: Vorox, ISBN 978-1-888906-27-1
- 2001 Secret Societies: Spies & Revolutionaries, ISBN 978-1-888906-29-5
- 2001 Into the Dark, ISBN 978-1-888906-28-8
- 2001 Imperial Survey 4: Li Halan Fiefs, ISBN 978-1-888906-26-4
- 2001 Imperial Survey 5: Decados Fiefs, ISBN 978-1-888906-30-1
- 2002 Star Crusade 2: Lost Worlds, ISBN 978-1-888906-21-9
- 2002 Secret Societies: Heretics & Outsiders, ISBN 978-1-888906-31-8
- 2002 Lord Erbian's Stellar Bestiary, ISBN 978-1-888906-34-9
- 2003 Alien Expeditions: Orphaned Races Hironem & Ascorbites, ISBN 978-1-888906-38-7
- 2003 Imperial Survey 6: Imperial Fiefs (PDF, as a free download)

Collections:

- 2000 Lords & Priests, ISBN 978-1-888906-24-0 (contains Lords of the Known World and Priests of the Celestial Sun)
- 2002 Aliens & Deviltry, ISBN 1-888906-33-2 (contains Children of the Gods and The Dark Between the Stars)
- 2003 Worlds of the Realm, ISBN 978-1-888906-35-6 (contains: Hawkwood Fiefs, al Malik Fiefs, Hazat Fiefs, Li Halan Fiefs, and the previously unprinted Imperial Fiefs)

d20 System:

- 2001 Fading Suns: d20, ISBN 978-1-888906-32-5
- 2003 d20 Character Codex, ISBN 978-1-888906-37-0

Passion Play:

- Passion Play: Fading Suns Live-Action Roleplaying, ISBN 978-1-888906-23-3

Fiction:

- 1998 Tales of the Sinful Stars, ISBN 978-1-888906-14-1 (OOP)

=== RedBrick Publications ===
- 2007 Second Edition Revised Rulebook (not to be confused with 2012's Fading Suns Player's Guide Revised Edition Core Rulebook)
  - Editors: Alex Wichert, Carsten Damm, Kathy Schad, James D. Flowers
  - Description: Mostly identical to Second Edition main rulebook. The layout was changed slightly, the index was expanded, important tables were gathered and printed in an appendix. Another adventure (called Pandemonium Unchained) was added.
- 2007 A Road So Dark (PDF; included in the 2011 collection Shards)
  - Author: Angus McNicholl
  - Description: an adventure about a previously unknown jumproute between two stellar systems.
- 2007 Imperial Survey Vol. 7: Church Fiefs
  - Author: Mat Wakefield
  - Description: this details the Church planets Artemis, Holy Terra, Pentateuch, De Moley, and Pyre
- 2007 Kraken's Loom (PDF; included in the 2011 collection Shards)
  - Author: Angus McNicholl
  - Description: this adventure leads the characters into barbarian space in search of a lost heirloom, but the situation is complicated by being the strangers in a strange land.
- 2008 Arcane Tech
  - Authors: Bill Bridges, Alan Bryden, Brian Campbell, Andrew Greenberg, Lee Hammock, Dave Harrison, Samuel Inabinet, Bill Maxwell, Angus McNicholl, Angelus Michaels, Laura Poplin, Rustin Quaide, Sandra Schneider, Nicky Rea, Jay Verkuilen, James Walker-Bumcrot, Mat Wakefield, Martin Welnicki, Alex Wichert, Gabriel Zarate
  - Description: this sourcebook contains reprinted and refreshed material from "Forbidden Lore: Technology", as well as new technological items, ranging from alien technology to weird tech to new weapons and gear.
- 2008 Ruinous Folly (PDF; included in the 2011 collection Shards)
  - Author: Angus McNicholl
  - Description: this adventure takes the characters from a private auction to the turbulent atmosphere of Gargantua in search of a lost treasure, but the treasure has ideas of its own.
- 2008 Dead End (PDF; included in the 2011 collection Shards)
  - Author: Thomas Baroli
  - Description: this adventure takes the characters from a religious ceremony, to an obscure plot of murder and intrigue
- 2011 Fading Suns Shards Collection Volume One (Print and PDF Release)
  - Author: Thomas Baroli, Angus McNicholl
  - Description: compiles and updates the previously released PDF adventures Dead End, Ruinous Folly, Kraken's Loom, and A Road So Dark into one volume.

=== FASA Games Publications ===
- 2012 Fading Suns Player's Guide - Revised Edition Core Rulebook. (not to be confused with 2007 Fading Suns Second Edition Revised Rulebook) -- produced by RedBrick, published by FASA Games, Inc.
  - Author: Todd Bogenrief, Vidar Edland, Chris Wiese, Andrew Greenberg, Bill Bridges, Phil Cameron, Richard Ashley, Thomas Baroli, Ruben Ramos, Mark Stout, James Sutton
  - Description: Similar in places to the Fading Suns Second Edition, with rules extensively re-written (especially combat rules). Updates and additions throughout.
- 2013 Fading Suns Game Master's Guide - Revised Edition Core Rulebook
  - Authors: Todd Bogenrief, Vidar Edland, Richard Ashley, Thomas Baroli, Brandon van Buren, Phil Cameron, Tristan Lhomme, Ruben Ramos, Mark Stout, James Sutton, Dennis Watson, and Chris Wiese, with reused material by Bill Bridges, Brian Campbell, Andrew Greenberg, Robert Hatch, Jennifer Hartshorn, Chris Howard, Sam Inabinet, Ian Lemke, Jim More, Rustin Quade
  - Description: Chapter 1 - Game Mastering; Chapter 2 - Hazard; Chapter 3 - Antagonists; Chapter 4 - Fiefs & Planets; Chapter 5 - Hawkwood Fiefs; Chapter 6 - al-Malik Fiefs; Chapter 7 - Hazat Fiefs; Chapter 8 - Li Halan Fiefs; Chapter 9 - Decados Fiefs; Chapter 10 - Imperial Fiefs; Chapter 11 - Pandemonium;
- 2015 Criticorum Discord - A Fading Suns Drama Book
  - Description: Three dramas for Fading Suns provide the backdrop to the beginnings of an uprising in the Known Worlds. The al-Malik world of Criticorum is highlighted, with each drama taking place on the planet itself, or within the star system.

=== Ulisses Spiele GmbH ===
- On November 1, 2016, Holistic Design announced that Ulisses Spiele GmbH has taken over publishing the Fading Suns roleplaying game.
- In 2020, Ulisses started a Kickstarter campaign for several new books.
- In August 2020, Kickstarter backers received the electronic version of the new Fading Suns third edition "Universe Book".
- In October 2020, Kickstarter backers received the electronic version of the new "Character Book", the new "Gamemaster Book" and the new "Intrigues and Escapades".
