= Machiavelli in popular culture =

Niccolò Machiavelli, Italian diplomat and secretary of the Florentine Republic, has been a popular figure and thus widely represented in culture since the posthumous distribution of his political tract, The Prince.

== Renaissance drama ==
In English Renaissance theatre (Elizabethan and Jacobian), the term "Machiavel" (from 'Nicholas Machiavel', an "anglicization" of Machiavelli's name based on French) was used for a stock antagonist that resorted to ruthless means to gain and preserve royal authority, and is an archaic variant of the word "Machiavellian".

Christopher Marlowe's play The Jew of Malta (ca. 1589) contains a prologue by a character called Machiavel, a Senecan ghost based on Machiavelli. Machiavel expresses the cynical view that political power is gained by wickedness, saying:

I count religion but a childish toy,
And hold there is no sin but ignorance.

Marlowe's play The Massacre at Paris is also an example of the genre.

William Shakespeare's titular character, Richard III, refers to Machiavelli in Henry VI, Part III, as the "murderous Machiavel". William Shakespeare's tragic plays, such as Othello, Macbeth, and Richard III, feature characters whom are an example of the stage Machiavel, a type of character whom advances themselves politically via devious means.

The level of Machiavelli's influence on Shakespeare has divided scholars, and many have attempted to reconcile the connection between the two authors. The research by John Roe explored a typical "Machiavel" character in the form of Richard III, while also juxtaposing Machiavelli in relation to Shakespeare's rendition of more conventionally just rulers, such as Henry V, as well as other kings such as Richard II, Henry IV, and King John. Although Shakespeare's focus is primarily on the history of the subject, his fictionalized figures like Hamlet and Macbeth are also commented on.

== Modern culture ==
Somerset Maugham's last book Then and Now fictionalizes Machiavelli's interactions with Cesare Borgia, which formed the foundation of The Prince.

Niccolò Machiavelli plays a vital role in the young adult book series The Secrets of the Immortal Nicholas Flamel by Michael Scott. He is immortal, and is working in national security for the French government.

Machiavelli is also featured in The Family, a fiction novel on the Borgia family, written by Mario Puzo and published posthumously in 2001 by his longtime girlfriend, Carol Gino. The Family is effectively his last novel, but released two years after his death.

Niccolò Machiavelli aids Cesare Borgia and protagonist Nicholas Dawson in their dangerous intrigues in Cecelia Holland's 1979 historical novel City of God. David Maclaine writes that in the novel, Machiavelli "is an off-stage presence whose spirit permeates this work of intrigue and betrayal ... It is a brilliant introduction to the people and events that gave us the word 'Machiavellian.'" Machiavelli appears as an Immortal adversary of Duncan MacLeod in Nancy Holder's 1997 Highlander novel The Measure of a Man, and is a character in Michael Scott's novel series The Secrets of the Immortal Nicholas Flamel (2007–2012). Machiavelli is also one of the main characters in The Enchantress of Florence (2008) by Salman Rushdie, mostly referred to as "Niccolò 'il Macchia", and the central protagonist in the 2012 novel The Malice of Fortune by Michael Ennis.

Television dramas centring on the early Renaissance have also made use of Machiavelli to underscore his influence in early modern political philosophy. Machiavelli has been featured as a supporting character in The Tudors (2007–2010), Borgia (2011–2014) and The Borgias (2011–2013), and the 1981 BBC mini series The Borgias. In the 2011 television series The Borgias, Machiavelli (portrayed by Julian Bleach) is depicted as a high-ranking official in Florence and counselor to the Medici family, he weighed the alliance proposals from Cardinal della Rovere and Cesare Borgia with great care. Della Rovere advocated for Florence to grant the French army safe passage to Rome. He was displeased when the Medici family, facing imminent devastation by French forces, capitulated to the King of France's demands. Subsequently, he formed an alliance with Cesare Borgia, offering counsel on matters concerning Savonarola and the whereabouts of Medici gold shipments for Cesare to seize.

A highly fictionalised version of Machiavelli appears in the BBC children's TV series Leonardo (2011–2012), in which he is "Mac", a black streetwise hustler who is best friends with fellow teenagers Leonardo da Vinci, Mona Lisa, and Lorenzo di Medici. In the 2013 episode "Ewings Unite!" of the television series Dallas, legendary oil baron J. R. Ewing wills his copy of The Prince to his adopted nephew Christopher Ewing, telling him to "use it, because being smart and sneaky is an unbeatable combination." In Da Vinci's Demons (2013–2015) – an American historical fantasy drama series that presents a fictional account of Leonardo da Vinci's early life – Eros Vlahos plays a young Niccolò "Nico" Machiavelli, although the character's full name is not revealed until the finale of the second season.

The 1967 The Time Tunnel episode "The Death Merchant" stars character actor Malachi Throne as Niccolò Machiavelli, who has been time-displaced to the Battle of Gettysburg.

Machiavelli is played by Damian Lewis in the 2013 BBC radio play The Prince written by Jonathan Myerson. Together with his defence attorney Lucrezia Borgia (Helen McCrory), he presents examples from history to the devil to support his political theories and appeal his sentence in Hell.

Rapper Tupac Shakur read The Prince while in prison recovering from an attempt on his life. After he was released he used a pseudonym "Makaveli", referencing Machiavelli. Death Row Records released The Don Killuminati: The 7 Day Theory, the first posthumous album by Shakur under the name of Makaveli.

In the 1993 crime drama A Bronx Tale, local mob boss Sonny tells his young protégé Calogero that while he was doing a 10-year sentence in jail, he spent his time reading Machiavelli, which helped him pass time and stay out of trouble. He describes Machiavelli as "a famous writer from 500 years ago". He then tells him how Machiavelli's philosophy, including his famous advice about how it is preferable for a leader to be feared rather than loved if he cannot be both, has made him a successful mob boss.

Machiavelli also appears as a young Florentine spy in the third season of Medici, where he is portrayed by Vincenzo Crea. He is addressed as "Nico" in all appearances except the season finale, where he reveals his full name.

There is a board game with the name Machiavelli. In the 1980 book The Complete Book of Wargames, game designer Jon Freeman praised the game, stating that "Machiavelli is one of the most attractive games available; color is rampant, and the counters, each with the particular emblem of the country involved, are spectacular." Freeman noted however that the only problem was there was lack of "a system for handling religion, a prime motivating factor of the times." Freeman gave this game an Overall Evaluation of "Good", concluding, "Yet Machiavelli is still good fun."

Some 20th-century Italian-American mobsters were said to have cited quotes from The Prince. John Gotti and Roy DeMeo would regularly quote selective phrases from The Prince.

=== Video games ===
Machiavelli appears in the popular historical video games Assassin's Creed II (2009) and Assassin's Creed: Brotherhood (2010), in which he is portrayed as a member of the secret society of Assassins. He is voiced by Shawn Baichoo. Shortly after recovering the Apple of Eden from Rodrigo, Ezio meets with Mario, Leonardo, and Machiavelli to discuss what to do in order to protect the artifact, ultimately deciding to send it to Caterina Sforza in Forlì. However, when Ezio and Machiavelli arrive in the city, they find it under siege by an army of mercenaries led by Checco and Ludovico Orsi, who have been hired by Rodrigo to obtain a map made by Caterina's late husband showing the locations of Altaïr's Codex pages, which in turn lead to the Vault. In the second game, Ezio convinces Machiavelli that he can lead The Order of Assassins, recruiting people for the Brotherhood and restoring it to its former strength.

Merchant Prince is video game developed by HDI and released in 1994 by QQP; it was then released as the Machiavelli: The Prince in 1995 by MicroProse. It is the first game of the Merchant Prince video game series. A sequel, Merchant Prince II, was released in 2001.

He appears in Sid Meier's Civilization VII as a playable leader.
