= Bill Bridges (game designer) =

American author and game designer

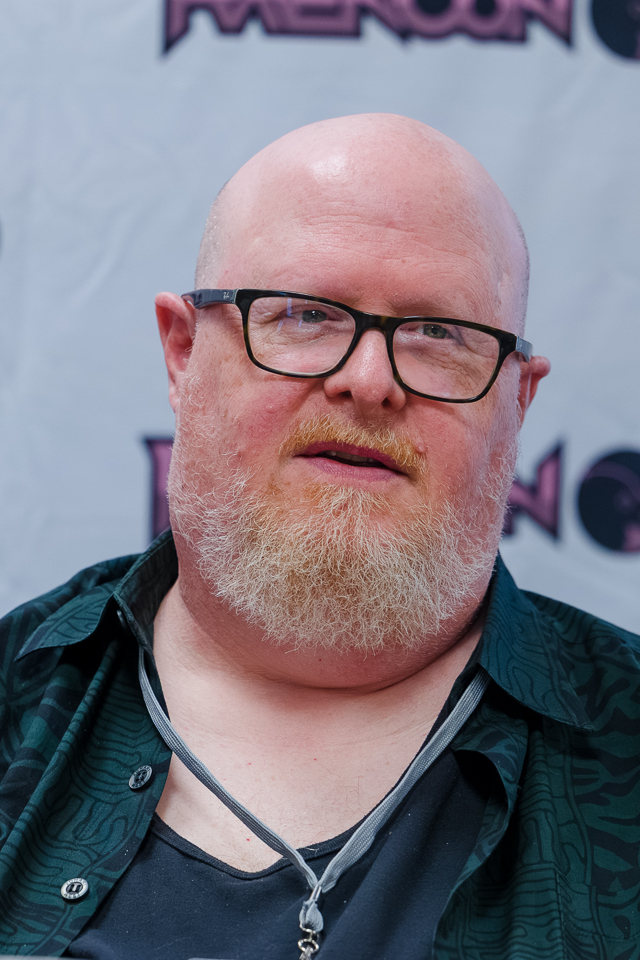
- Bridges at RavenCon in 2026
- Born: 17 September 1965 (age 61)
- Occupations: Writer; Game designer
- Notable work: Werewolf: The Apocalypse; Mage: The Ascension; Promethean: The Created; Fading Suns
- Website: bill-bridges.com

Bill Bridges (born September 17, 1965) is an American role-playing game developer and fantasy author. He designed the role-playing games Werewolf: The Apocalypse, Mage: The Ascension, and Promethean: The Created. He additionally worked on a video game based on his Fading Suns role-playing game Emperor of the Fading Suns. He is currently a developer at Holistic Design.

== Career ==
=== Early career ===
Bill Bridges was an original developer for White Wolf Publishing from 1992 to 1995, where he contributed to Werewolf: The Apocalypse. Bridges was the line editor for Werewolf and as one of the early World of Darkness developers, he was a key figure in developing the look and tone of the productions for the setting. He worked on the Storytelling system rules for all the World of Darkness games. It was his goal to present werewolves as something besides accursed humans, an idea which has since been echoed in some popular contemporary novel series. He was a part of the original Mage: The Ascension design team. He has many writing credits encompassing most of the second edition World of Darkness games, and helped design Rage, the Werewolf collectible card game.

=== 1995 to 2000 ===
He left White Wolf Publishing in 1996 to join Holistic Design (HDI), where he co-created Fading Suns with Andrew Greenberg. Bridges received inspiration for the setting from The Book of the New Sun by Gene Wolfe and Foundation by Isaac Asimov. Bridges' largest were his Alustro's Journals, a series of "Marco Polo" style diaries featuring the travels of the pilgrim Alustro and his companions. He was the primary author of the War in the Heavens series, which revealed the secrets of the Symbiots and the Vau. Minor literary similarities can be seen between the Symbiots and the 'defenders of Gaia' Garou in Werewolf: the Apocalypse.

His other work includes writing for Chaosium, the development of the Star Trek: The Next Generation and Star Trek: Deep Space Nine role-playing games for Last Unicorn Games, Emperor of the Fading Suns for Segasoft (based on Fading Suns,), co-writing scripts for Viacom's "interactive horror movie" Dracula Unleashed, and work on Starfleet Academy for Interplay.

=== 2000 to date ===
Bridges moved back to White Wolf Publishing on February 12, 2002, replacing Jess Heinig as the developer for the revised edition of Mage: The Ascension. Bridges saw the game he created through to its conclusion in the Time of Judgment. Bridges and Ken Cliffe developed the book, The World of Darkness (2004), a single rulebook to cover the new version of the World of Darkness setting and rule system. For the new World of Darkness edition, he worked on the new core rules and was a designer, author, and developer on Mage: The Awakening. He later moved on to Promethean: The Created, which won several awards.

Bridges also co-chairs the presenter programming for the biannual myth-based academic conference and performance festival, Mythic Journeys. His published novels include The Silver Crown, and The Last Battle, both of which are set in the Werewolf: The Apocalypse setting.

== Publications ==
=== Books ===
- Hobby Games: The 100 Best (Green Ronin), contributor
- My Time Among The Stars
- The Silver Crown

=== Role-playing games ===
- Fading Suns (Holistic Design, Inc.)
- Werewolf: the Apocalypse (White Wolf)
- Mage: the Awakening (White Wolf)
- Mage: the Ascension (White Wolf)
- New World of Darkness (White Wolf)
- Classic World of Darkness (White Wolf)
- Afghanistan d20: Real-Life Roleplaying (HDI)
- Carnage (HDI)
- Creature Collection (White Wolf)
- Columbia d20: Real-Life Roleplaying (HDI)
- FBI d20: Real-Life Roleplaying (HDI)
- Fist of God (HDI)
- Pendragon (Chaosium)
- Rapture (HDI)
- Savage Mountains (Pendragon) (Chaosium)
- Scion: Hero (White Wolf)
- Street Fighter (White Wolf)
- Street Fighter Screen (White Wolf)
- Street Fighter Players Guide (White Wolf)
- Secrets of Shadowloo (Street Fighter) (White Wolf)
- Somalia d20: Real-Life Roleplaying (HDI)
- Star Trek: the Next Generation (Last Unicorn)
- Star Trek: Narrator’s Toolkit (Last Unicorn)
- Star Trek: Deep Space Nine (Last Unicorn)

=== Video games ===
- Dracula Unleashed (Viacom)
- Star Trek: Starfleet Academy (Interplay)
- Emperor of the Fading Suns (SegaSoft)
- Final Liberation: Warhammer 40K (SSI)
- Hammer of the Gods (New World)
- Merchant Prince II (Take-Two Interactive)
- Mall Tycoon (Take-Two Interactive)
