= Byzantium Secundus =

Byzantium Secundus is a supplement published by Holistic Design in 1996 for the science fiction space opera role-playing game Fading Suns.

== Contents ==
Byzantium Secundus, the first supplement published for the Fading Suns role-playing game, is a 128-page softcover book designed by Christopher Howard, Andrew Greenberg, and Bill Bridges, with interior art by John Bridges, Tim Callender, Mike Chaney, Michael Gaydos, Craig Gilmore, Anthony Hightower, Mark Jackson, Brian Mead, Joshua Gabriel Timbrook, and J. Chadlee Stowe, and cover art by John Poreda.

The planet Byzantium Secundus is the capital of a dangerous galactic segment of the Fading Suns setting. This supplement provides details of the planet in five chapters and an appendix:

- "History" gives a historical background of the planet, and its rise and fall in power and influence.
- "Places" details the geography of the planet.
- "People" provides details on a list of notable personalities, including their personalities, aspirations, and game statistics. It also provides information about some of the indigenous creatures of the planet.
- "Conspiracies" describes the many plots that are percolating among the rich and powerful.
- "Drama" lists a number of plot ideas and story hooks that a referee could use to design a campaign.
- The appendix gives information about the "Imperial Eye", the Emperor's secret intelligence service, and also suggests how players could design a character who is a member of the Imperial Eye.

== Reception ==
In the January 1997 edition of Arcane (Issue 15), Andy Butcher called Byzantium Secundus "a very promising start for the Fading Suns system... There's very little here that isn't useful in some way." The only downside Butcher foresaw was the amount of local politics detailed in the supplement: "If you're not really interested in politics, the book becomes much less useful... If you want your Fading Suns games to be space opera, and so simplify the issues, a lot of this book is wasted." However, Butcher concluded by giving it a rating of 7 out of 10, calling it "a well-written, interesting sourcebook for a game with a great deal of potential, and if you do want your Fading Suns games to concentrate on politics, it really is a must."

In the August 1997 edition of Dragon (Issue 238), Rick Swan said this supplement "contains all the ingredients for a thrilling campaign", giving it an above average rating of 5 out of 6.

== Reviews ==
- Backstab #43
- Świat Gier Komputerowych #104
