= Battles of Destiny =

1992 video game

- Developer(s): Holistic Design
- Publisher(s): Quantum Quality Productions
- Designer(s): Ken Lightner
- Programmer(s): Ken Lightner
- Artist(s): Ty Pike
- Composer(s): Rob Lefebvre
- Platform(s): MS-DOS
- Release: 1992
- Genre(s): Turn-based strategy
- Mode(s): Single-player, multiplayer

Battles of Destiny is a 1992 strategy video game developed by Holistic Design (as "Several Holistic Dudes") and published by Quantum Quality Productions.

== Gameplay ==
Battles of Destiny is turn-based, and takes place on maps that represent the earth or fictional worlds. Cities on these maps allow players to produce units; production requires time rather than money, as more sophisticated units take longer to manufacture. Twenty different unit types are available in the game, including land, sea and air units.

== Development ==
In its January 1993 issue, Computer Gaming World reported that Quantum Quality Productions (QQP) had "recently" purchased Battles of Destiny from an unnamed developer in Atlanta, Georgia. The game was accepted through QQP's "unsolicited submissions" program, which had previously resulted in Solitaire's Journey by designer Andrew Visscher. Battles of Destiny was developed by Holistic Design, then under the name Several Holistic Dudes. It was the team's first computer game. The game was announced at the 1992 Consumer Electronics Show, alongside Conquered Kingdoms. It was released in 1992.

== Reception ==
The game received a score of 4/5 from Lee Buchanan of Game Players PC Entertainment. In Computer Gaming World, William R. Trotter offered Battles of Destiny a positive review, calling it "seductively easy-to-learn and quite addictive to play." The Chicago Tribune's Dennis Lynch praised the game.

Brian Walker of Computer Games Strategy Plus called Battles of Destiny "a fine game, and one that warrants repeated play as well as offering a serious cerebral challenge."

=== Legacy ===
Holistic Design later released Battles of Destiny as freeware. Noting that it could be emulated with DOSBox, writer Jerry Pournelle wrote in 2011 that Battles of Destiny "holds up pretty well if you like that sort of thing".
