= Merchant Prince (video game) =

1994 video game

- Developer: HDI
- Publishers: QQP; MicroProse (Machiavelli)
- Designer: Ed Pike
- Programmers: Ken Lightner; Rob Lefebvre; Andrew Hackett
- Artists: Ed Pike; Cris-Jon Lindsay; Kathy Nielson
- Composer: Rob Lefebvre
- Platform: MS-DOS
- Release: 1994
- Genre: Turn-based strategy
- Modes: Single-player, Multiplayer

Merchant Prince is video game developed by HDI and released in 1994 by QQP; it was then released as the Machiavelli: The Prince in 1995 by MicroProse. It is the first game of the Merchant Prince video game series. A sequel, Merchant Prince II, was released in 2001.

== Gameplay ==
The map the player receives from uncle Niccolo resembles those of the period: it is highly accurate close to Venice but grows much less so the further one goes. The mechanic has been praised by reviewers: "Though its gameplay was nowhere near as sophisticated as that of its near contemporary Civilization, Merchant Prince/Machiavelli did a better job of capturing what exploring is really like. Very rarely in the human experience are people pushing into an entirely blank unknown space. There are always rumors, always guesses, always some advice either from locals or past chronicles."

== Reception ==
Computer Gaming World called it "an excellent game of strategy and intrigue". Computer Game Review gave it a platinum triad award (high marks from three reviewers) before naming it the magazine's 1994 strategy game of the year. The Swedish magazine High Score scored it as 100%, calling it "a completely brilliant strategy game" (ett fullkomligt lysande strategispel). The German magazine Power Play gave the game a 79%, calling it "a true gem in the genre of economic games" (eine wahre Perle im Genre der Wirtschaftsspiele) and principally faulting its simplistic graphics. On the other hand, PC Player gave it a rating of 56, finding it essentially similar to The Patrician and Hanse, and Game Bytes considered it "almost great", given that the AIs—while otherwise competent—were unable to negotiate and interact at the level of Master of Orion, released the same year.

Merchant Prince was a runner-up for Computer Gaming World's "Strategy Game of the Year" award, which ultimately went to Master of Orion. The editors called Merchant Prince "a strategy game that captures the greed and treachery of medieval Italy even more than the classic Machiavelli boardgame from The Avalon Hill Game Company."

David Cook complained that "Machiavelli quickly becomes a game of doing the same old thing over and over" and that "for a game that touts its historical basis... it just doesn't mine the richness of their period". Jay & Dee reviewing it for the Dragon magazine gave it 3 of 5 stars.

Next Generation reviewed the game, rating it three stars out of five, and stated that "there's more than enough here to keep strategy fans happy."

=== Later views on the series ===
It has subsequently earned praise compared to other turn-based strategy games, including by professors of history. By 2009, Troy Goodfellow was enthusing, "Merchant Prince/Machiavelli is one of the very few strategy games that gave you partial information and very few games since have picked up that torch. Fog of war generally applies to enemy troop positions, of course, but map information in strategy games is generally either perfect or perfectly unknown. Exploring is less about moving hesitantly to what you think is there and more about walking boldly into the darkness because you know that the next civilization can't be too close or that no one ever starts more than a few seconds from a gold mine."

== Bibliography ==
Carter, Tim (July 1994), "Machiavellian Machinations", Computer Gaming World, No. 120 (PDF), pp. 128–132.
