= Machiavelli (disambiguation) =

Niccolò Machiavelli (1469–1527) was an Italian political philosopher, musician, poet and romantic comedic playwright.

Machiavelli may also refer to:

- Machiavelli: The Prince, a computer game centered on trading and skullduggery
- Machiavelli (card game), the Dutch version of Citadels
- Machiavelli (Italian card game), a card game derived from Rummy
- Machiavelli (board game), a board game set in Renaissance Italy
- Machiavelli (surname), an Italian surname

== See also ==
- Macchiavelli (disambiguation)
- Machiavel (band), a Belgian rock group
- Makaveli, a pseudonym adopted by the late American rapper Tupac Shakur
