= Lost Admiral Returns =

1991 video game

- The logo for LAR.
- Developer(s): Fogstone
- Platform(s): Windows
- Release: NA: January 18, 1991; PAL: January 20, 1991
- Genre(s): Turn-based strategy
- Mode(s): Single-player, Multiplayer

Lost Admiral Returns is a turn-based naval strategy game by Fogstone, the creator of The Grandest Fleet, Lost Admiral 2, Lost Admiral, and Conquered Kingdoms. The game has game play similar to rock paper scissors, except with ships

== Gameplay ==
The gameplay is very similar to chess, but with a much larger map, a wider variety of units, and a greater level of detail. Combat uses a rock/paper/scissors system to determine outcomes. There are three phases of play during a turn: the navigation map, the battle map, and the end of turn overview. Ships on the navigation map can be identified by its corresponding image or hull classification symbol

=== Battleship ===
Battleships are robust vessels used for aggressively attacking the enemy. They have 12 hit points and can deal up to 6 points of damage. They are extremely vulnerable to submarine attacks. Their heavy armor makes machinegun fire ineffective against battleships.

=== Carrier ===
Carriers are defensively weak fleet vessels with 7 hit points. They have 2 attack strength but all vessels nearby get an extra attack point due to fleet airplanes. The planes on board appear to be Douglas TBD Devastators. Carriers are extremely vulnerable to all vessels but the passive damage buff for nearby vessels and their extended sight range makes the carrier an essential element of any fleet.

=== Cruiser ===
Cruisers are like small versions of battleships. With eight hit points they have less firepower than battleships but come equipped with a depth charge launcher to repel submarine assaults. They can deal two points of damage towards submerged submarines.

=== Destroyer ===
Destroyers are fast multipurpose vessels used to harass enemy transports and disrupt sea routes. They have six hit points. They are most effective against submerged submarines with their multi-depth charge launcher which deals six hit points of damage to submerged submarines.

=== Submarine ===
Submarines in Lost Admiral Returns are modeled after German U-boats. They have six hit points which makes them very vulnerable to a destroyer's depth charge attack. Because of this a suggested tactic is to surface the sub. When surfaced, the destroyer's guns deal four points of damage, giving the sub a chance to escape. During battle phase, the submarine fires three torpedoes against enemy ships. There is no ammunition limit for submarines.

=== Patrol Boat ===
Patrol boats are light and fast boats used for reconnaissance and transport raid. They deal only one point of damage, which is enough to sink a transport ship in one turn, but not enough to engage in a duel with an armored transport ship. They are armed with machineguns and are boosted greatly by the presence of a carrier.

- Armored Transport
- Transport
- Flagships

== See also ==
- Hull classification symbol
- Fogstone
