= Passion Play (game) =

Live action role-playing game

Passion Play is a live action role-playing game created by Bill Bridges and Bill Maxwell and first published by Holistic Design in 1999. Passion Play is based on the 1996 table top role-playing game Fading Suns.

== Reviews ==
- Pyramid
- Envoyer #57

== See also ==
- Fading Suns
