= Machiavelli (surname) =

Machiavelli is a surname. Notable people with the name include:

- Niccolò Machiavelli, an Italian political philosopher, musician, poet and romantic comedic playwright
- Nicoletta Machiavelli, an Italian film actress
- Zanobi Machiavelli, an Italian painter and illuminator

== See also ==
- Machiavelli (disambiguation)
- Macchiavelli (surname)
