= Lords of the Known Worlds =

- Publisher: Holistic Design
- Publication date: 1997

Lords of the Known Worlds is a 1997 role-playing game supplement published by Holistic Design for Fading Suns.

== Contents ==
Lords of the Known Worlds is a supplement in which the role of nobles within its neo-feudal sci-fi universe is spotlighted. Among the setting's four key power blocs—Nobles, the Universal Church, the Merchant League, and the Emperor—the noble Houses exert the most influence, steering the politics and daily operations of the Known Worlds. After a short fictional prologue, the book outlines noble identity and mechanics with new Benefices and Afflictions tailored for aristocratic characters. It then delves into individual chapters on the five major Houses—Hawkwood, Decados, Hazat, Li Halan, and al-Malik—offering each one's history, ethos, political alliances, holdings, and notable figures. Minor Houses and alien nobles follow in shorter, similarly structured entries. Throughout, the sourcebook intersperses rules enhancements, such as new combat options and the introduction of the Kossack troops from House Decados, alongside adventure hooks to fuel noble-centric plots.

== Publication history ==
Lords of the Known Worlds is the third sourcebook published for Fading Suns.

== Reception ==
Andy Butcher reviewed Lords of the Known Worlds for Arcane magazine, rating it a 7 out of 10 overall, and stated that "like Byzantium Secundus, the book is best suited to political campaigns where social interaction is emphasised over physical combat and adventure. However, it does have more to offer even the most action-packed of campaigns, because nobles make both excellent player characters and NPC patrons."

== Reviews ==
- Backstab #39 (as "Les Seigneurs des Mondes Connus")
- Casus Belli #104
