= War in the Heavens: Hegemony =

War in the Heavens: Hegemony is a 2000 role-playing game adventure published by Holistic Design for Fading Suns.

== Plot summary ==
War in the Heavens: Hegemony is an adventure in which the mysterious aliens called the Vau are featured.

== Reviews ==
- Pyramid
- Backstab
