= Forbidden Lore: Technology =

Role-playing game supplement

Forbidden Lore: Technology is a 1996 role-playing game supplement published by Holistic Design for Fading Suns.

== Contents ==
Forbidden Lore: Technology is a supplement in which the status of science and technology in its decaying universe is explored. Set in a future where knowledge is suppressed by the Church and Noble Houses to preserve their power, the book delves into both the ideological and mechanical aspects of this decline. It offers new game equipment and expanded rules, including additions like starship combat. Structured across six chapters and an appendix, the book begins with a narrative prologue and an overview of science in the setting. It then moves into content such as equipment for civilians and military forces, rules for vehicle combat, cybernetics, and robotic entities called golems. The starship chapter contains a detailed approach to ships, gear, economics, and character creation options. "Weird Tech" introduces exotic items such as psychic tools, alien artifacts, and Church relics. The final chapter examines ecclesiastical control over science, while the appendix introduces Church Preceptors—a faction committed to restoring education.

== Reception ==
Andy Butcher reviewed Forbidden Lore: Technology for Arcane magazine, rating it a 7 out of 10 overall, and stated that "Forbidden Lore: Technology is another good book for this promising system. The starships chapter alone makes it worthwhile for most refs, but all of the info contained here is useful stuff that's likely to be handy for any group."

== Reviews ==
- Rollespilsmagasinet Fønix (Issue 17 - June 1997)
- Ringbote (Issue 13 - Jul/Aug 1997)
