= Passion play (disambiguation) =

Passion Play is a dramatic presentation depicting the Passion of Christ.

Passion Play may also refer to:

== Literature ==
- Passion Play, a 1979 novel by Jerzy Kosiński
- Passion Play, a 1992 novel by Sean Stewart
- Passion Play, a 2010 novel by Beth Bernobich

== Music ==
=== Albums ===
- A Passion Play, a 1973 album by Jethro Tull, about the journey of a recently deceased man through the afterlife
- Passion Plays (album), a 1985 compilation album by The Passions
- Passion Play (album), a 1994 record album by Teena Marie
- Dark Passion Play, a 2007 Nightwish album

=== Songs ===
- "Passion Play", a 1981 song by Janis Ian from Restless Eyes
- "Passion Play", a 1983 song by Night Ranger from Midnight Madness
- "Passion Play (When All the Slaves Are Free)", a 1991 song by Joni Mitchell from Night Ride Home
- "Passion Play", a 1995 song by Papas Fritas from Papas Fritas

== Other uses ==
- Passion Play (film), a 2010 film directed by Mitch Glazer
- Chokher Bali: A Passion Play, a 2003 Indian drama film
- Passion Play (game), a live-action role-playing game, based on the table top role-playing game Fading Suns
- Passion (musical), a 1994 musical by Stephen Sondheim

== Stage plays ==
- Oberammergau Passion Play, performed since 1634
- Passion Play (play), a 1981 stage play by Peter Nichols (also known as Passion for US production)
- Passion Play, a 2003/2004 stage play by Sarah Ruhl

== See also ==
- Passion (disambiguation)
