= Chris Wiese =

American role-playing game designer

- Occupation: Role-playing game designer.

Chris Wiese is a role-playing game designer.

== Career ==
Chris Wiese began in the gaming industry as the marketing director and acting CEO of Holistic Design. He is one of the current partners in the company. He has made contributions to a number of their products, most particularly in the design of deck plans such as the Letters of Marque starship line, along with Space Station Cirrus. He is the co-designer (with Ken Lightner) of Noble Armada, a miniatures game based on the flagship Holistic RPG Fading Suns. He also was the primary developer for their other miniatures lines including Carnage and Fantasy Encounters.

He has also worked heavily with the miniatures company Metal Express LLC.

Under his tenure as vice president of GAMA, he more than doubled the income of the Origins Game Fair. With the retirement of the previous president, he was elected president. However, controversy over the wording over reforms to the GAMA charter, in part due to an effort led by Ryan Dancey, led to a complete changeover of personnel the following year.

Weise is the co-author of Dark Between the Stars and Merchants of the Jumpweb. His other credits include the Living Force Campaign Guide (2001) for the Star Wars Roleplaying Game Revised Edition, and the Fading Suns Player's Guide (Revised Edition, 2012)

Holistic shut down production in 2003, at which point Wiese remained as the company President, and continued to spend his time with both GAMA and the new company he started, World Builders.
