= The Perfect General =

1991 video game

- Developer: White Wolf Productions
- Publishers: NA: Quantum Quality Productions; EU: Ubi Soft; Kirin Entertainment (3DO); Killer Bee Software (Windows)
- Designer: Mark Baldwin
- Platforms: MS-DOS, Amiga, 3DO, Windows
- Release: 1991: MS-DOS, Amiga; 1996: 3DO; 2003: Windows
- Genre: Wargame
- Modes: Single-player, multiplayer

The Perfect General is a computer wargame published in 1991 by Quantum Quality Productions for the Amiga and MS-DOS. A 3DO port by Game Guild adds new scenarios and was published in 1996 by Kirin Entertainment.

The rights for the original version were purchased by Mark Kinkead in 2002, The Perfect General Internet Edition for Windows was published in 2003 by Killer Bee Software.

== Gameplay ==
The game is a turn-based map-oriented military simulation game. Players take on the role of a military commander, managing resources and engaging in tactical battles in a hexagonal grid-based map.

Along with Modem Wars and Populous, it was one of the early games to offer an online multiplayer mode for real-time-matches via telecommunication networks. The original online-game was played via modem or null modem serial connection.

== Reception ==
The Perfect General sold 75,000 copies by June 1993. Computer Gaming World in 1992 described The Perfect General as "a wonderful game system with a mediocre AI and great two-player potential", and later named it the best wargame of the year. A 1993 survey in the magazine of wargames gave the game three-plus stars out of five, stating that it "sacrifices realism for playability". A 1994 survey gave the Greatest Battles of the 20th Century two-plus stars out of five, noting the game's ease of use and "enjoyable", but inaccurate, scenarios.

In 1996, Computer Gaming World declared The Perfect General the 107th-best computer game ever released. The magazine's wargame columnist Terry Coleman named it his pick for the 12th-best computer wargame released by late 1996.

== Legacy ==
A sequel, The Perfect General II, was released in 1994.
