= Noble Armada =

Board game published by Holistic Design in 1998

Noble Armada is a board game published by Holistic Design in 1998.

== Gameplay ==
Noble Armada is a science fiction miniatures wargame involving spaceship combat, compatible with the Fading Suns role-playing game. The game also featured shipside boarding with soldiers fighting in the interiors of enemy ships.

== Publication history ==
Shannon Appelcline explained that Noble Armada, "co-designed by Holistic founder Ken Lightner and marketing guy Chris Wiese", was the first of "a slew of tabletop miniatures game releases" in 1998 from Holistic Design. Holistic also published a fully supported line of miniatures for the game. A second edition of the game was published in 2002. Two sets of deckplans for Noble Armada were released, one in 2005 and one in 2006.

Mongoose Publishing began producing a new version of the game called A Call to Arms: Noble Armada (2011). This version used the "Call to Arms" system from Mongoose in the Fading Suns universe which was licensed by their partner RedBrick Limited.

== Reception ==
Shannon Appelcline noted that in publishing this game, Holistic was "figuring out how to take advantage of the lucrative miniatures market" and that the game's high "price point and muddy rules marred the first edition of Noble Armada, but they weren't enough to stand in the way of the game's success. Better, both of these elements would be resolved in a second edition (2002), which cleaned up the rules and lowered the price point by splitting the Ships of the Line miniatures apart from the rules. Because of Noble Armada's success, work also began on a computer adaptation, which would have been the second Fading Suns computer game."

== Reviews ==
- Pyramid
- Envoyer
- Backstab #11
