= Mall Tycoon =

2002 video game

- Developer(s): Holistic Design
- Publisher(s): Take-Two Interactive
- Director(s): Andrew Greenberg
- Producer(s): Timothy Beggs
- Designer(s): Andy Harmon
- Programmer(s): Ken Lightner; Edward Glamkowski
- Artist(s): John Bridges
- Platform(s): Windows
- Release: February 6, 2002
- Genre(s): Business simulation
- Mode(s): Single-player

Mall Tycoon is a business simulation game, released in 2002 for Windows 95/98/ME. It was developed by Holistic Designs and published by Take-Two Interactive. It has two sequels: Mall Tycoon 2 (which also had a "Deluxe" extended edition) and Mall Tycoon 3.

== Gameplay ==
The game begins with an empty plot of land upon which the player develops their mall. The player can build shops, customize decorations, organize special events such as fashion shows, and manage mall employees. It is important for the player to work out what is profitable and what is not to ensure the survival of the fledgling mall. The mall may become overrun with zombies or aliens which can be eradicated when the player calls upon the Men in Black.

== Development ==
The game was developed by Holistic Design, creator of the Merchant Prince series.

== Reception ==
Reception

Aggregate score
Aggregator	Score
Metacritic	41/100

Review scores
Publication	Score
Computer Gaming World	1/5 stars
GameSpot	46/100
GameZone	75/100
IGN	47/100
Computer Games Magazine	30/100

In the United States, Mall Tycoon sold 420,000 copies and earned $7.6 million by August 2006, after its release in January 2002. It was the country's 36th best-selling computer game between January 2000 and August 2006. Combined sales of all Mall Tycoon series entries released between January 2000 and August 2006 had reached 820,000 units in the United States by the latter date.

The game received "generally unfavorable" reviews, according to video game review score aggregator Metacritic. Computer Gaming World criticized the game for its wonky camera and frustrating interface. The magazine opined that even the poorly received Airport Tycoon is a better game than Mall Tycoon.

== Sequels ==
=== Mall Tycoon 2 ===
- Developer(s): Fusion Digital Games; Virtual Playground
- Publisher(s): Global Star Software
- Designer(s): Holistic Design, Inc.
- Engine: PC (Windows)
- Platform(s): Windows 95/98/ME
- Release: NA: September 24, 2003
- Genre(s): Business simulation game
- Mode(s): Single-player

Mall Tycoon 2 is a business simulation game, released in 2003. It is the sequel to Mall Tycoon, which allows the gamer to construct, expand and thereafter manage a shopping mall. It describes itself as the "Ultimate Mall Experience".

The Mall is visited by many types of customers, from children to seniors. There are also criminals among the clientele, who should be caught by the mall's security guards, and visits by dogs, which indicates a low level of hygiene and security. Staff can be hired to perform these duties, such as janitors for cleaning floors, but some of the hiring specifications require background checks, which cost money and affect bottom line.

The number of stores and the rating also affect the number of customers the mall gets. For every store, five people can fit into your shopping mall, and the higher the rating, the more people come to your mall. The game provides a wide variety of stores. They include electronics, clothing, food, entertainment, sports and services. Many of the more advanced stores need to be researched before they can be constructed. A player can build a mall atrium and arrange monthly events to promote the mall. Such promotions include car shows, a mall oasis and a circus. An "owner" also can build restaurants, movie theaters, bowling alleys and arcades to attract customers. As with hiring research, these new additions also must be researched and evaluated.

Floors may be changed easily and can be customised. Wood is the most common flooring medium, but other types include a puzzle floor for the kids' area and tiles for the food court. Adding floors to the mall is expensive, but is a necessary investment when all vacant areas have been occupied and expanded to their limits.

The Deluxe version of Mall Tycoon 2 adds certain scenarios, more customer types and other new features.

=== Mall Tycoon 3 ===
- Developer(s): Cat Daddy Games
- Publisher(s): Global Star Software
- Engine: Cat Daddy 2005 Dev Build 3124
- Platform(s): Windows 2000/XP
- Release: NA: October 26, 2005
- Genre(s): Business simulation game
- Mode(s): Single-player

Mall Tycoon 3 is a business simulation game, released in 2005. It was developed by Cat Daddy Games and published by Global Star Software. It is the third and final installment in the Mall Tycoon series, after the original Mall Tycoon and Mall Tycoon 2. The game was released to mixed reviews, getting lower than the previous games.

After selecting to play in sandbox mode, three starting locations are given. The player may build a mall in a neighborhood, a big city, or beside the beach. One may also choose to play a campaign game instead, and select from several different challenges.

Interior view of mall in Career Mode

Unlike in the previous installments of the series, Mall Tycoon 3 allows players to create customized stores. Over 40 types of stores of various types are available for placement in a pre-made store or a player may design their own, putting in everything from sale signs to the merchandise racks. Also customizable are the employees; their job capabilities and personal appearances are adjustable. In addition to regular in-line stores, there are also a handful of kiosks, such as one that sells cellular phones.

In the first two Mall Tycoon games, stores were created by placing the set store size, and then adding a store to them. In Mall Tycoon 3, the player paints the floor to create a store, allowing for them to be of any shape or size.

Mall Tycoon 3 features a total of 5 buildable mall levels.
