= Battles in Time =

1995 video game

- Developer(s): Quantum Quality Productions; American Laser Games
- Publisher(s): Quantum Quality Productions
- Platform(s): PC
- Release: 1995
- Genre(s): Strategy
- Mode(s): Single player

Battles in Time is a PC video game and was the only product co-developed by Quantum Quality Productions and American Laser Games. The game is a time travel-based strategy game.

== Plot ==
In the far future, humans no longer needed war. When aliens decide to invade the planet, a test is made up to provide commanders for the army. Four time periods are used: 2025, World War II, the Roman Empire, and prehistoric times. Succeeding in these four missions will allow the player to take on the alien threat.

== Reception ==
Reception

Review score
Publication	Score
Computer Game Review	51/35/62

The game received a largely negative review from Computer Game Review.
