= Hammer of the Gods (video game) =

1994 video game

- Developer: Holistic Design
- Publisher: New World Computing
- Producers: Mark Caldwell; Deane Rettig
- Programmers: Rob Lefebvre; Ken Lightner
- Composers: Rob Lefebvre; Bruce Nunley
- Platform: MS-DOS
- Release: NA: 1994
- Genres: Turn-based strategy, 4X
- Modes: Single-player, multiplayer

Hammer of the Gods is a turn-based strategy video game developed for MS-DOS by Holistic Design and published in 1994 by New World Computing. It takes place in Viking Age Europe, with a Norse fantasy setting. Hammer of the Gods is one of the main games that spawned the creation of the Heroes of Might and Magic strategy series.

== Gameplay ==
Hammer of the Gods is an empire-building game with a focus on military strategy. The goal of the game is to build an empire through expansionism while completing a set of goals that are specified by the gods of Norse mythology. The game is won when a player completes the quest of Odin, the highest god in the Norse pantheon. Upon starting the game, each player chooses to control one of four races: human, elf, troll, or dwarf. Each race has unique characteristics for military units, and each is presented with a different hierarchy of gods which set different goals to meet. When the player meets each of these goals, the gods will present the player with a reward at the end of that turn. These rewards vary in nature, and can include powerful military units, magical flying ships for fast transportation, or higher income from conquered towns, to name a few examples.

Before beginning the game, the player chooses one of two world map layouts. One choice is to play on a representation of Europe during the Viking golden age beginning in 700AD. The other is a computer-generated map, which will be different for each campaign started. Each player starts the game with control of one town, and must explore the world to conquer new towns for income and military security.

In addition to military conquest, players can manage diplomacy between their respective empires. Each player's relations are labelled as peaceful, neutral, or at a state of war. Trade can be initiated between empires with neutral or peaceful relations.

When two armies meet on the world map, a battlefield is displayed showing the player's and enemy's units. Players moves their units during their turns, with the goal of completely eradicating the enemy's units or forcing a retreat. Most units can only attack other units that are adjacent on the battlefield, but archers and wizards can attack from a distance. When a town or a castle is attacked, the defending player may have fortifications established, which can greatly influence the outcome of the battle.

Although the main gameplay consists of military conquest, the goal of each player is to meet goals set forth by the gods of the Norse Edda. Between turns, a tree representing the pantheon for each race is displayed, and the player chooses from available gods to try to meet their goals. Generally, the higher the god is on the tree, the more difficult the goal will be to accomplish. Some are very straightforward, such as "go to the ruins of Stonehenge and defeat the dragon there," while some are more complicated and require multiple turns to complete, such as requiring the player to conquer a number of towns.

== Reception ==
The game was reviewed in 1995 in Dragon #221 by Jay & Dee in the "Eye of the Monitor" column. Jay gave the game 4 out of 5 stars, while Dee gave the game 3 stars.

Reception

Review scores
Publication	Score
Computer Gaming World	3.5/5
Dragon	4/5 (Jay); 3/5 (Dee)
