= Street Fighter: The Storytelling Game =

Tabletop role-playing game

Street Fighter
The Storytelling Game
- Designers: Bill Bridges, Phil Brucato, Brian Campbell, Sean. Lang, Mike Tinney and Stephan Wieck
- Publishers: White Wolf Publishing
- Publication: 1994
- Genres: martial arts, superhero fiction
- Languages: English
- Systems: Storytelling System

Street Fighter: The Storytelling Game is a role-playing game based on the Street Fighter video game series. It uses most of the basic game mechanics from White Wolf's World of Darkness games. It was released in 1994 and contains most of the characters from Super Street Fighter II. The Storytelling Game is currently out of print, as are all games using the original Storytelling System.

== Character generation ==
Character generation was similar to White Wolf's other games (Vampire, Werewolf, Mage, etc.). The character has nine attributes divided into three categories (Physical, Mental, Social). The player then distributed points among these stats and selected a Concept, Demeanor, and various skills and backgrounds. Like the class-analogues of the other Storytelling System games, Street Fighter characters selected a martial art based on the fighting styles of the characters from the game. The character's style determined which techniques the character could learn by spending fewer points. For example, practitioners of Shotokan karate and kung fu could learn the Fireball technique more easily than someone who selected sambo as his style. The character's style also determined how much Chi and Willpower the character started with. Certain special moves required the character to spend Chi or Willpower. In addition, characters also had an Honor score. Honor helped the character regain Chi; a character with high Honor recovered Chi more easily than a character with low Honor.

== Game mechanics ==
Gameplay was based on previous White Wolf games. The player rolled a number of ten-sided dice based on their skill level, attribute score, or both and needed to achieve a number of "successes" based on the difficulty of the feat in question. In addition to skills found in many other White Wolf games (Drive, Computer, Survival, etc.) several new skills were introduced. For example, a Style Lore skill that allowed a character to determine what fighting style an opponent is using and what his approximate level of skill is. Players also distributed points to Punch, Kick, Grab, Athletics, Focus, and Block techniques. These techniques not only increased the character's fighting ability but served as prerequisites for some martial arts special maneuvers.

A new addition to gameplay was a Combat Card system.

== Products ==
A total of one basic module and five supplement books were released for this game. (In White Wolf Code order)

- Street Fighter: The Storytelling Game (1994, ISBN 1-56504-118-6)
- Secrets of Shadowloo (1994, ISBN 1-56504-153-4)
- Street Fighter Storyteller's Screen (1994, ISBN 1-56504-162-3)
- Street Fighter Player's Guide (1994, ISBN 1-56504-550-5)
- The Perfect Warrior (1995, ISBN 1-56504-552-1)
- Contenders (1995, ISBN 1-56504-551-3)

== Reception ==
Ian Williams for Vice said that "Street Fighter stands as an oddity of innovative design, shrewd licensing, and wild-eyed worldbuilding."
