= The Entrance to the Grand Canal, Venice =

Painting by Canaletto

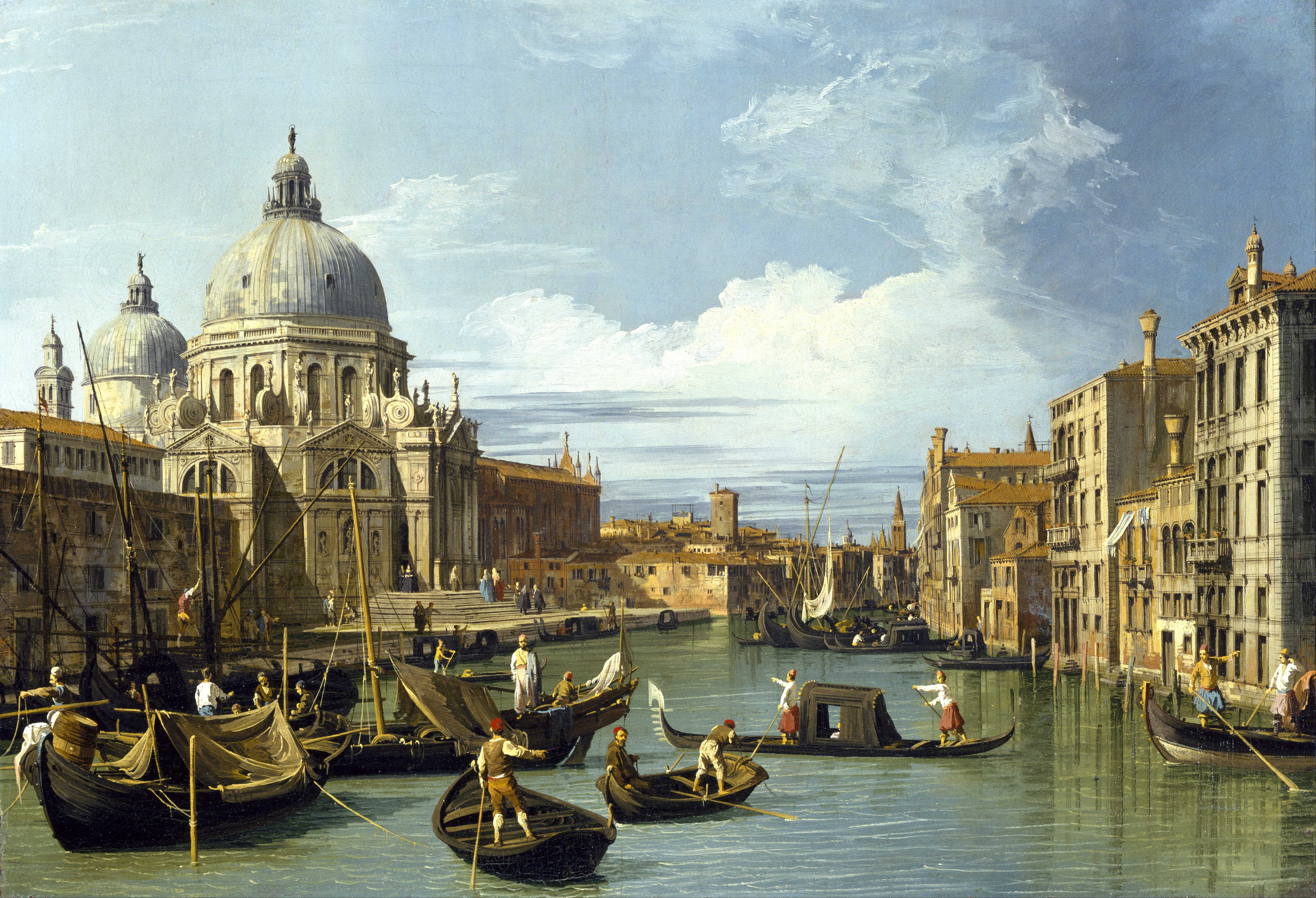
- Artist: Canaletto
- Year: c. 1730
- Medium: Oil on canvas
- Dimensions: 49.6 cm × 73.6 cm (19.5 in × 29.0 in)
- Location: Museum of Fine Arts, Houston, Houston

The Entrance to the Grand Canal, Venice, is a c. 1730 oil painting by Italian painter Canaletto. It is a Rococo landscape painting measuring 49.6 by 73.6 centimeters (19.5 in × 29.0 in) currently held as part of the Robert Lee Blaffer Memorial Collection in the Audrey Jones Beck Building at the Museum of Fine Arts, Houston, in Houston, Texas, and was a gift to the museum from Sarah Campbell Blaffer. The large church at the left of the painting is the Basilica of Santa Maria della Salute. A variant of the painting with a larger church tower and an additional building is used as the Venetian screen in the 2001 video game Merchant Prince II.

== See also ==
- List of works by Canaletto
