= The Pure Wargame =

1995 video game

- Developer: Quantum Quality Productions
- Publisher: Quantum Quality Productions
- Platform: MS-DOS
- Release: 1995
- Genre: Strategy
- Mode: Single-player

The Pure Wargame: Death From Above, Volume 1 is a 1995 strategy video game developed and published by Quantum Quality Productions for MS-DOS-compatible computers.

== Gameplay ==
The Pure Wargame is a wargame which focuses on airborne assaults that happened in World War II.

== Reception ==
Reception

Review scores
Publication	Score
Computer Game Review	71/100
Computer Gaming World	2/5
Hyper	72/100
Next Generation	3/5
PC Gamer (US)	82%
Gambler	85%
PC Joker	42%
Power Play	69%
Secret Service	75%
World Village (Gamer's Zone)	3/5

Next Generation gave it three stars out of five and stated, "Even war gaming newbies should be able to get into Death From Above with no trouble. There's some question, however, about whether or not they'll want to. For someone unfamiliar with the wargaming experience, this one can be overwhelming."

Mike Robel of Computer Games Strategy Plus recommended it as "excellent" for its fast pace, ease of learning, and higher replay value over the richer and more detailed V for Victory: Market-Garden.

The game was in the 40 top strategy/war games in terms of both dollars and units sold, according to PC Data.
