= Mike Tinney =

American game designer

- Occupation: Game designer

Mike Tinney is a game designer who has worked primarily on role-playing games.

== Career ==
Mike Tinney was running his own live action role-playing games and working as one of the editors for White Wolf's Mind's Eye Theatre when he became the line manager for Mind's Eye Theatre. Tinney later became vice president of licensing and marketing for White Wolf, and based on his proposal White Wolf started the "ArtHaus" imprint in the late 1990s which was intended to produce more affordable game supplements.

Tinney was one of the contributors to the Creature Collection from White Wolf's Sword & Sorcery imprint. In 2002, Steve Wieck stepped down as president of White Wolf, and Tinney became the new president; under Tinney, White Wolf underwent big changes, starting with significant alternations and updates to the World of Darkness.Tinney was the co-developer of Street Fighter: The Storytelling Game (1994).

On 11 November 2006, CCP Games and White Wolf jointly announced a merger between the two companies during the keynote address at the Eve Online Fanfest 2006. White Wolf Publishing became a wholly owned independent subsidiary of CCP with Tinney remaining as the president of CCP North America | White Wolf, until he left in 2012 to join a games-health startup.
