= The Red Crystal: The Seven Secrets of Life =

1994 video game

- Developer(s): Quantum Quality Productions
- Publisher(s): Quantum Quality Productions
- Platform(s): MS-DOS
- Release: 1994
- Genre(s): Role-playing

The Red Crystal: The Seven Secrets of Life is a role-playing video game for MS-DOS developed and published by Quantum Quality Productions in 1994.

== Reception ==
Reception

Review scores
Publication	Score
PC Gamer (US)	75%
PC Zone	43/100
PC Player	21/100

Computer Gaming World in March 1994 described The Red Crystal as "Gauntlet gone amuck". A longer review in April 1994 criticized the game's many "pointless" random encounters, necessity to reroll for "demi-godlike" attributes and use "cowardly hit-and-run" combat tactics to survive, poor documentation, abruptly unwinnable moments, and other flaws. The magazine concluded "we can't believe that it says QQP on this game's box". Reviewing the game for PC Gamer US, Neil Randall wrote, "Despite some clumsy interface elements, Red Crystal is worthwhile. It's fast, fun, and refuses to take itself too seriously." PC Zone offered a negative review, concluding, "Don't ask your friends to play this if you want to keep them." Jörg Langer of Germany's PC Player summarized The Red Crystal as "a very bad game" and a "tragedy". He criticized its sound and found it "disappointing" from a technical angle, calling the collision detection and mouse control "amateurly programmed". Langer argued, "After no more than five minutes, an immense boredom sets in."

In 1996, Computer Gaming World named The Red Crystal the 22nd worst game ever made. The editors called it "deadly proof that QQP should have stuck to strategy/wargames."
