= Ken Lightner =

American game designer

Ken Lightner is a game designer with experience in multiple fields. His primary area of expertise is in computer games.

== Career ==
Ken Lightner is the founder of Holistic Design. Lightner co-designed a tabletop miniatures spaceship combat game with Chris Wiese called Noble Armada (1998), designed to be compatible with the role-playing game Fading Suns. Lightner was head of programming for video games at Holistic, while Andrew Greenberg directed development for video games. Lightner created additional game lines specifically for publication using the d20 System, including modern world military adventures such as Afghanistan (2002). Among his more notable successes with Holistic include Battles of Destiny, Hammer of the Gods, Final Liberation, Machiavelli the Prince, Merchant Prince II, Emperor of the Fading Suns, and Mall Tycoon. He also worked heavily on a computer game called Noble Armada that never materialized. He has worked as a third-party developer for very large companies such as Mindscape, Take Two Interactive, Red Storm, MicroProse, and Segasoft. Mall Tycoon was arguably his largest game, which sold extremely well. The Merchant Prince series was highly critically acclaimed.

He was the line developer for their Real-Life Roleplaying series covering d20 Afghanistan, d20 Columbia, d20 Somalia and the d20 FBI. He also contributed heavily towards the flagship rpg product Holistic Design produced Fadings Suns, being the principal author of the military supplement Legions of the Empire. He also worked in conjunction with Chris Wiese to design the miniature based game Carnage and Noble Armada (upon which the aforementioned Computer Game was based). He also contributed fiction to the Book of All Flesh by Eden Studios.

Holistic shut down all of its production on role-playing game lines in 2003, and Lightner later co-founded the computer game company Blue Heat Games. This new company specializes in cell phone games, and some of his credits with them include MLB Baseball 2004, NHL Hockey and Sega Snowboarding. He has also had a short story published in an anthology produced by Eden Studios, Inc.

== See also ==
- Merchant Prince (series)
