= Final Liberation: Warhammer Epic 40,000 =

1997 video game

Final Liberation
- Developer: Holistic Design
- Publisher: Strategic Simulations
- Directors: Andrew Greenberg; Ken Lightner
- Producer: John Eberhardt
- Programmer: Ken Lightner
- Artist: Brian Mead
- Composer: The Samsara Project
- Series: Warhammer 40,000
- Platform: Microsoft Windows
- Release: November 20, 1997
- Genre: Turn-based tactics
- Modes: Single-player, multiplayer

Final Liberation is a turn-based tactics video game released for Microsoft Windows in 1997, and re-released on GOG.com in 2015 and Steam in 2026. The game is best known as the first video game based on Epic, a table-top wargame set in the fictional Warhammer 40,000 universe. The game borrows heavily in terms of rules and style from the table-top game in an attempt to recreate the table-top experience on a computer as opposed to using the setting as a backdrop for different genres of videogames.

== Gameplay ==
The game features two modes, campaign and skirmish. In the campaign mode, the player works through a series of linked games to eradicate the Ork presence on the planet Volistad. The recruitment of new units has an experience point system attached, meaning newly recruited units are less effective than seasoned veterans. The campaign mode is only single-player, and only the Imperium of Man is available to the player. In the Skirmish mode, the player can set up a battle which pits the player against an array of computer or human-controlled opponents via a hot-seat mode, or network play over a local network or the Internet. Such battles can be played on maps ranging in size from vast to small. Unlike the campaign, Orks are fully playable in this mode.

Each battle in the game operates a turned based system where players carry out all actions for all of their available units, or where players take alternate turns acting with one unit at a time.

The campaign features a non-linear story line where the player controls the Imperial forces to liberate the planet of Volistad from Ork raiders. The territory controlled at each stage determines the points available for the replacement and repair of units.

Unit and formation selection plays a large part of the campaign mode of the game. Both sides, the Orks and the Imperium, are presented with a wide variety of units. These units include a large selection of infantry, ground vehicles (tanks, armoured personnel carriers, and artillery) and aircraft drawn from the Warhammer 40,000 universe. Winning certain maps gives access to specialist units such as superheavy tanks or Titans.

The game also includes live action cutscenes mixed with CGI.

== Reception ==
Reception

Review scores
Publication	Score
Computer Gaming World	4/5
PC Gamer (US)	86%
Computer Games Strategy Plus	3.5/5

PC Gamer US's T. Liam McDonald wrote, "Final Liberation is a fun, tactically challenging game that faithfully captures the Warhammer system for the first time on PC." Although he criticized its graphics, he concluded that "computer gaming finally has a game worthy of the Warhammer name." In Computer Gaming World, Tim Carter echoed McDonald's criticism of the graphics, calling Final Liberation "perhaps the ugliest game I have seen in ages." However, he enjoyed the game, and summarized, "Other than better graphics, what more could you ask for?"

Phil Thé of Computer Games Strategy Plus felt that the game contained "quirks and idiosyncrasies", criticizing its artificial intelligence, interface and full motion video cutscenes. However, he concluded, "If you're a 40K fan, you're probably going to buy this game; if you're not, perhaps you should."

Final Liberation was a runner-up for GameSpot's 1997 "Best Cinematics" award, which went to The Curse of Monkey Island. The editors wrote, "SSI's conversion of the popular science fiction tabletop war game packs a special surprise: full-motion-video cinematics to rival those of the biggest-budgeted game release you could think of."
