= RedBrick Limited =

Role-playing game publisher

RedBrick Limited was a New Zealand game company that produced role-playing games and game supplements. The company moved to the United States in 2010 and established business as RedBrick LLC. In 2018, RedBrick Publishing – the successor to RedBrick's earlier incarnations – started operations.

== History ==
FASA Corp granted RedBrick Limited an Earthdawn license in 2005 after they submitted a proposal. RedBrick named their line "Earthdawn Classic" to differentiate it from an Earthdawn edition published by Living Room Games and to emphasize that they were emulating the original art styles and setting of the original FASA products. RedBrick began publication on this line with their Earthdawn Player's Companion (2005). Earthdawn had two companies in 2005 and 2006 simultaneously publishing material for the setting, but it was not long before RedBrick was the only remaining publisher of the game. Holistic Design licensed Fading Suns to RedBrick Limited in 2007, and RedBrick stated their intention to publish new supplements utilizing the original Victory Point System, along with a third edition of the game, and began releasing adventures in PDF in 2007. RedBrick continued to publish their edition of Earthdawn through 2009, at which time they published a third edition of Earthdawn using the Flaming Cobra program at Mongoose Publishing for distribution. RedBrick Limited brought several of their publications to Mongoose to publish through Flaming Cobra, starting with their third edition of Earthdawn. RedBrick LLC officially ceased operations in 2012 after RedBrick's owners set up a new business with one of the founders of FASA Corporation, transferring their licenses to the nascent FASA Games, Inc.
