= Merchant Prince II =

2001 video game

- Developer: Holistic Design
- Publisher: TalonSoft
- Director: Andrew Greenberg
- Producer: Ashton Fletcher
- Programmers: Ken Lightner; Edward Glamkowski
- Artist: Mike Snyder
- Series: Merchant Prince
- Platform: Windows
- Release: NA: April 30, 2001; EU: May 25, 2001
- Genre: Turn-based strategy
- Modes: Single-player, Multiplayer

Merchant Prince II is a 2001 turn-based strategy game of economic, political, and military conquest. The game is developed by Holistic Design and published by Take-Two Interactive under TalonSoft label. It is the sequel to the 1994 video game Merchant Prince. (Note: Computer Games Magazine mistakenly claimed that the original Merchant Prince was released in "1995".)

== Reception ==
Reception

Aggregate score
Aggregator	Score
Metacritic	57/100

Review scores
Publication	Score
AllGame	3/5
Computer Games Magazine	2.5/5
Computer Gaming World	1.5/5
EP Daily	6.5/10
GameSpot	5.2/10
GameSpy	75%
GameZone	7/10
IGN	7.3/10
Next Generation	3/5
PC Gamer (US)	50%

Merchant Prince II received "mixed" reviews according to the review aggregation website Metacritic. So little was added to gameplay that it was properly a rerelease rather than a sequel, and the changes to the graphics were considered uglier, with a zoomed-in and less user-friendly interface. ("End turn", for instance, was represented by an unlabeled wine glass.) It was largely panned by critics and even the positive review by IGN called it a "cheap reissue" and pardoned it only because of the difficulty of finding the original DOS games. Computer Gaming World opened its review, "Merchant Prince 2 is the kind of title that gives strategy gaming a bad name," and concluded with, "Mainstream consumers pulled in by the fascinating topic are—once again—going to feel ripped off, confused, dumb, and jaded toward turn-based strategy games." Kent Conrad found the implementation of the research tree "half-baked" and ended his review with "There is a good game hiding inside of Merchant Prince II, and that game is Machiavelli: The Prince. Get that instead." Kevin Rice of NextGen, however, said of the game, "It's virtually the same game it was eight years ago, designed to run under Windows instead of DOS, but in the end it's still an entertaining, unique turn-based strategy."
