= Macchiavelli (surname) =

Macchiavelli is an Italian surname. Notable people with the surname may include:

- Francesco Maria Macchiavelli (1608-1653), Italian cardinal
- Loriano Macchiavelli (born 1934), Italian author

== See also ==
- Machiavelli (disambiguation)
