= Rapture: The Second Coming =

Tabletop role-playing game

Rapture: The Second Coming is a role-playing game published by Quintessential Mercy Studio in 1995, with a second edition by Holistic Design in 2002.

== Description ==
Rapture: The Second Coming is a post-apocalyptic religious role-playing game.

== Publication history ==
Rapture: The Second Coming was written by William Spencer-Hale and published by Quintessential Mercy Studio in 1995.

Andrew Greenberg produced the new d20 edition of Rapture: The Second Coming of Holistic Design in 2002.

== Reception ==
Pyramid magazine reviewed Rapture: The Second Coming and stated that "Among the various theologicals on the market right now, Rapture: The Second Coming isn't the most esoteric or the most extreme game out there, but its probably the most in-your-face. The game takes its inspiration from various orthodox Christian views of the Apocalypse - the end of the world prophesied in the Bible, particularly in the Book of Revelations."

== Reviews ==
- Casus Belli #90
