= Merchant Prince =

Video game series

Merchant Prince is a turn-based 4X strategy video game franchise set in the Republic of Venice during the Renaissance. The first Merchant Prince was published in Europe in 1993, and North America in 1994; Machiavelli the Prince (Note: Also written Machiavelli: The Prince and Machiavelli, The Prince.) in 1995; and Merchant Prince II (Note: Also written Merchant Prince 2.) in 2001. All three were developed by Holistic Design (HDI) but had separate publishers. The first two use MS-DOS; the third Windows. All three support up to four players and differ chiefly in their graphics and user interface.

In general, the games are trade simulators where items are bought low, transported, and sold high. They achieved notability, however, for their representation of Venetian and papal politics, with players able to bribe senators and cardinals for political, military, and religious power. Overt attacks against other players can destroy one's popularity and influence, but the game offers a thieves' den where covert options include arson, rumor-mongering, and assassination. The games are won after a predetermined number of turns (years) by the player with the highest net worth, including the value of bribed senators and cardinals.

The game's world map has been praised as "capturing what exploring is really like", as the player expands beyond the known and certain world into distant seas and lands which have been filled in only by rumor, legend, and wild speculation.

== Story ==
The games begin with a letter from the player's wealthy uncle Niccolo announcing that he has died and left the majority of his estate to his daughters. He has left the player a yearly stipend of 100 florins (i.e., ducats), a map of the known world, at least one trading vessel, and some advice reminiscent of Machiavelli: "you must stick to the good so long as you can but if compelled by necessity you must be ready to use other means" and the "Golden Rule" that "he who has the gold makes the rules". The player's goal—over one lifetime or several—is to improve his family's standing.

== Gameplay ==
Players choose a family crest and surname rather than an individual name. Play begins in AD 1300 and can last (in the first two titles) as late as 1492, the year of Columbus's rediscovery of the Americas. The default map covers all of Afro-Eurasia and permits the rounding of the Cape of Good Hope but not the North Cape. This can be replaced by randomized maps with variable amounts of ocean, forest, desert, etc. The game is won by the first player to acquire a million florins or by the player with the highest net worth at game's end.

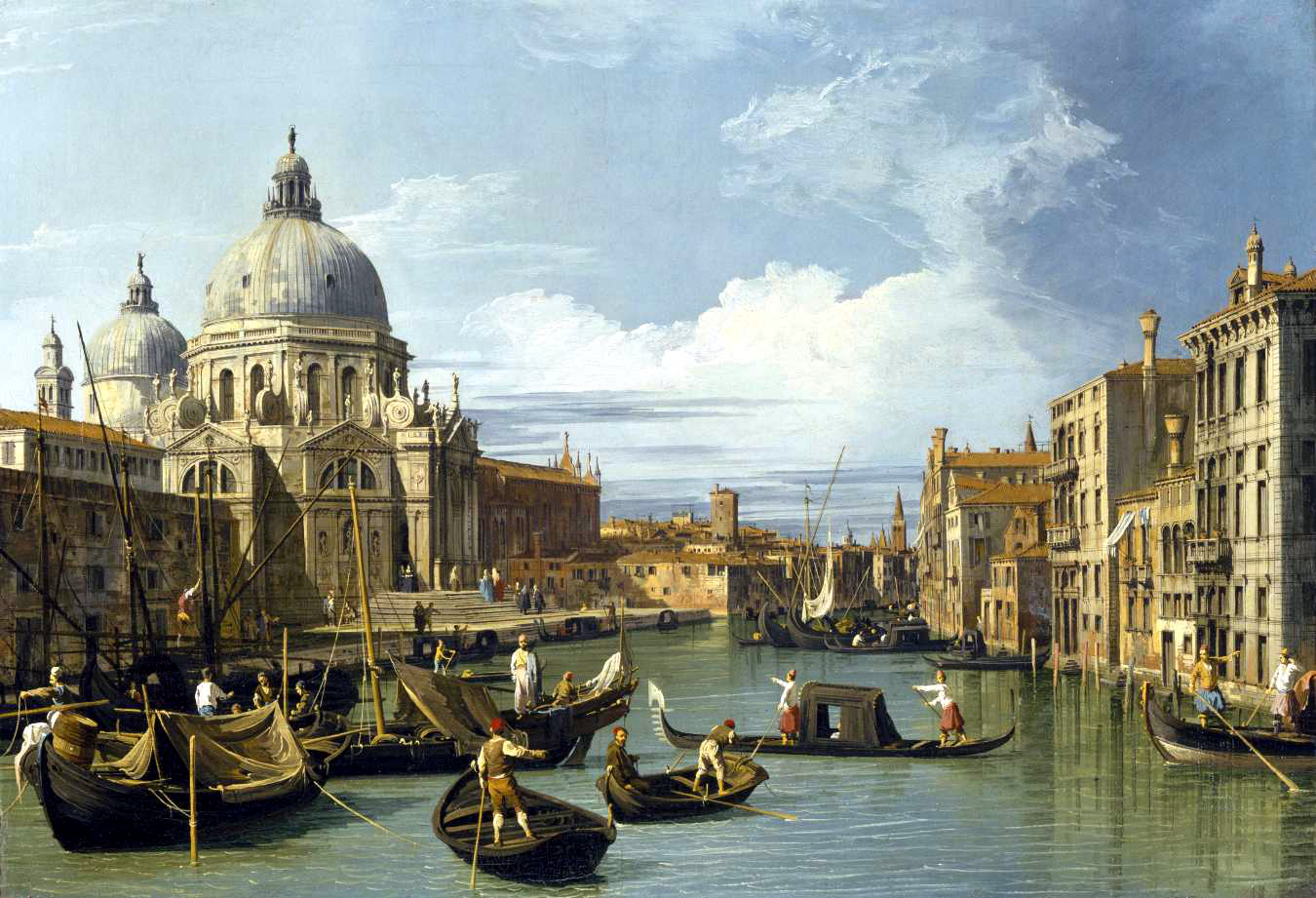
Canaletto's Entrance to the Grand Canal (c. 1730), a variant of which serves as the Venetian screen in Merchant Prince II

=== Venice ===
The player competes with three other families—either other humans or AIs of variable difficulty—to be the most successful clan in Venice. Opponents may be negotiated or allied with, aided, or threatened. The Council of Ten may all be bribed into service, allowing the player to be appointed as Venice's council head, general, admiral, or minister of construction. A family may only hold one office at a time, but any family with a senator must receive a post. Funds may be well-used or embezzled; those without access to the city's army may still hire large mercenary forces at the Campanile. The council head receives no funds but may try senators for treason. Support from a majority of the council at the decennial election allows one to hold the office of doge, controlling other appointments and Venice's taxation. Popularity can be improved by donations to the church, by throwing lavish masquerades, or by funding major works of sculpture, painting, and architecture. Defeating brigands and pirates in battle is also well received. The wealthiest families may purchase ecclesiastical benefices, providing income and influence in the college of cardinals. Enough influence at a conclave gives a player control over the papacy itself. Popes may embezzle church funds, "excommunicate" (i.e., place an interdict upon) Christian cities, and gather crusading armies. In some games, overindulgence in indulgences provokes an earlier Reformation, turning northern cities against Italy and its traders. Direct attacks against friendly cities or fellow Venetians, when proven, is highly unpopular and must be compensated through fines. For the devious, impatient, or wrathful, "den of iniquities" permits players to burn others' warehouses and homes, destroy reputations with rumormongering, (Note: The rumors are reported along with other messages and are easily customized.) or to assassinate senators, cardinals, doges, and popes. Being tied to the act can destroy one's reputation, but other players can be framed as well.

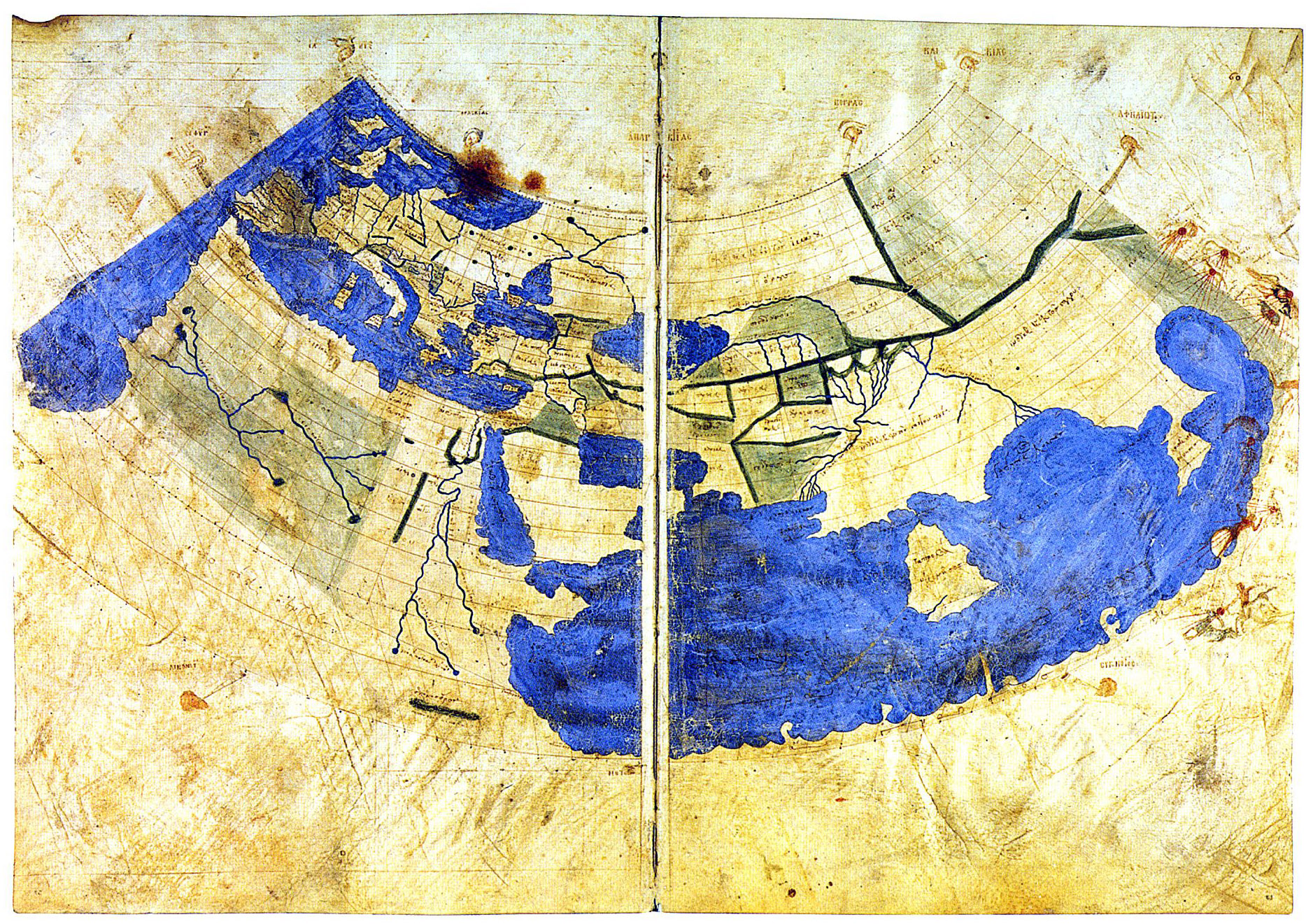
The world map from Ptolemy's Geography, rediscovered by the Byzantine monk Maximus Planudes c. 1300. Note the largely accurate treatment of the Mediterranean, while Scandinavia disappears, Scotland is placed at a right angle to England, Sri Lanka swells to a larger size than India, and the placement of the western shore of the World Ocean remains uncertain.

=== Exploration ===
The map the player receives from uncle Niccolo resembles those of the period: it is highly accurate close to Venice but grows much less so the further one goes. The mechanic has been praised by reviewers: "Though its gameplay was nowhere near as sophisticated as that of its near contemporary Civilization, Merchant Prince/Machiavelli did a better job of capturing what exploring is really like. Very rarely in the human experience are people pushing into an entirely blank unknown space. There are always rumors, always guesses, always some advice either from locals or past chronicles."

An accurate map of the world in a historical game of Machiavelli, along with a series of the maps bequeathed to players at game start by their deceased uncles. Note that, while Italy remains consistently accurate, distant features such as India and Japan shift, disappear, or become separate continents. Even nearby Anatolia sometimes mutates as well. The effect upon gameplay is pronounced when such maps are the only guide to exploration of randomly-generated worlds.

The player must send out trade or military units to explore the world, facing pirates, brigands, and storms at sea and in the desert, or negotiate with the other families to purchase more accurate maps from them. Many cities are initially closed to foreign traders and their leaders must be bribed or forcibly removed to open them to trade. Defeating a city with Venice's armed forces or one's own mercenaries permits one to control it (closing it to rivals) or to negotiate its status as a freeport (left open to rivals but providing a large boost to popularity). The time and effort exploration takes is somewhat compensated by the occasional discovery of extremely valuable relics—such as a head of John the Baptist—that are sold to the cathedral at Venice.

=== Trade ===
In addition to uncle Niccolo's stipend, the player can earn income from indulgences and government offices. Ultimately, the most profitable course is to begin trading various commodities among the world's major cities. Trade is possible via small or large galleys (fast and nimble but frail in storms), small or large cogs (slow and unable to use small rivers but resistant to storms at sea), donkey teams (resistant to rockslides), or camel caravans (resistant to sandstorms). Up to 15 units may be purchased and used together. The commodities include Venetian glass, French wine (as "grog"), relics from the Holy Land, African gold and ivory, Chinese silk, and Indonesian spices, (Note: The placement and graphics of the goods are set but the in-game descriptions are easily modified in the first two games. In Merchant Prince II, the names of the goods can be edited as well.) though not salt or slaves. The cities include major centers such as Venice and Khanbaliq (misspelled "Kahnbalig"), along with oddities like Antioch and imaginary locales like Shangri-La (as "Xiangrala"). (Note: The city names can be modified in Merchant Prince II.) Depending on the difficulty level, brigandry and piracy may be rampant and each successful attack makes them stronger still. Guards may be hired to deal with them but can be quite expensive and, if unpaid, will turn to brigandage. Goods become extremely valuable in times of crisis: during interdicts from the pope (driving away pious traders), outbreaks of plague (which usually begin a decade or two into the game), and wartime. Trading under such conditions can be highly profitable but risky: plague may destroy one's trading units and they may be attacked by rival or renegade armies. All three games support automated trading routes, although the path selection and bugginess varies among the versions.

The player graph from a game of Machiavelli, showing its progress up to 1343. Relics found during exploration gave the blue player an early lead. An alliance with red then permitted a rapid expansion following his election as both doge and pope. The descent of Italy into plague and war permitted red to start catching up, while the expense of early feuding has kept yellow and green from growing at the same speed.

=== History ===
The games begin in the year 1300. The default is for them to end in AD 1400, but they may be set to end after 15, 30, 60, 100, 150, or 192 years as well. The manual includes an overview and glossary of this period and incorporates aspects of the era both directly and through game mechanics. The Venetian–Genoese Wars, corsairs, Black Plague, condottieri, and indulgences appear and the players' actions may instigate an early Reformation, recreate the ignoble Fourth Crusade, or mirror the struggles of the Medicis, travels of Marco Polo, or precepts of Machiavelli. On historical maps, the rounding of Africa and assaults on Turkey, Persia, and India may be achieved by the players or AI ahead of the Portuguese, but there is no effect on the prosperity of Venice. The Hundred Years' War, Turco-Venetian wars, and Tatar invasions appear in minor form. Game mechanics push players into adopting a coasting trade for galleys, large caravans and convoys for important routes, and working for the good of all Venetians in public while covertly bribing officials and sabotaging rivals.

Numerous items, however, are simplified: the doges were appointed for life but the Ten served only one-year terms and could only have a single family member serving at a time. The Republic of Venice maintained its allegiance to Rome throughout the Western Schism but the earlier Avignon Papacy goes unmentioned. Cities only occasionally and randomly close themselves to trade. Florence is treated as a seaport in place of Pisa and Constantinople is given its earlier and terser name Byzantium.

Merchant Prince II included a few cut scenes and five new scenarios in addition to Afro-Eurasia and the random map generator. They were the Hanse (the Hanseatic League in the North and Baltic seas), the Mediterranean (a Venetian family), the Orient (a Shanghainese trader in the Far East), Marco Polo (along the Silk Road), and a fantasy treatment of Atlantis (represented as a single island city in the Atlantic). The scenarios were not differentiated apart from their maps, however: players continued to see Venetian gondolas and St Mark's in "Atlantis" and "compete[d] to become the Doge of China or the Pope of Asia".

== Game history ==
Merchant Prince was written by Several Dudes Holistic Gaming and released by Quantum Quality Productions (QQP) in 1993. Ed Pike credited his rereading of Machiavelli's Prince during the 1992 US presidential election, along with post-Watergate American politics generally, for his concept of the game. Pike said he aimed to "provide food for thought about our current times while remaining entertaining and not overly depressing". HDI also considered setting the game during the Roman Republic, but decided against that due to the numerous other Roman games then on the market.

In 1995, the renamed Holistic Design (HDI) and Microprose re-released it under the name Machiavelli the Prince. (Notwithstanding that Machiavelli was a Florentine and not a Venetian, the change was necessary owing to copyright issues.) Cities no longer accepted unlimited amounts of goods, particularly for high-value goods like relics and precious metals. The graphics were improved, along with aspects of the interface that (e.g.) permitted easier grouping of units, clarified the trade status of cities, and displayed the routes of long-distance ships. Ending the turn no longer required visiting Venice first. Machiavelli was released in two boxes: a thinner purple box with just the game and a thicker black box that included George Bull's Penguin translation of Machiavelli's Prince. Out of the box, the game usually crashed almost immediately if computer opponents were set at any difficulty except Novice. A patch (v.1.1) was released to fix the bug.

HDI and TalonSoft (an imprint of Take-Two) released Merchant Prince II in 2001. Only small galleys and light guards were available at game start; other aspects of the game now had to be unlocked via payments to a Leonardo figure. Additional new "technologies" made the units further resistant to disasters or weakened opponents. Players who wanted to focus on trade could disable this feature and play with the units of the earlier games. Merchant Prince II attempted to allow simultaneous movement in multiplayer games but the option was notoriously buggy. A patch (v.1.1) was also released to fix several bugs, particularly with its TCP/IP multiplayer mode.

== Multiplayer ==
Merchant Prince offered three multiplayer options: taking turns at a single computer (hotseat) or connecting two computers via cable (null modem) or internet (modem). Hotseat play supports up to four players; cable and modem play are limited to two human players against two computer opponents. Machiavelli added features to ease play by e-mail (PBEM), which supports up to four players. Merchant Prince II introduced TCP/IP support, but some players reported difficulties, including buggy trade routes.

== Reception ==
While warning that the game emphasized trade and popularity over conquest or destroying enemies, Computer Gaming World stated in April 1994 that "Merchant Prince is a finely balanced, well presented, and intensely enjoyable game" with random maps and online play giving it "considerable replay value". In June 1994 it was a finalist for the magazine's Strategy Game of the Year award, losing to Master of Orion. The editors wrote that the game "captures the greed and treachery of medieval Italy even more than the classic Machiavelli boardgame". Computer Game Review gave it a platinum triad award (high marks from three reviewers) before naming it the magazine's 1994 strategy game of the year.

== See also ==
- Republic of Venice and the State of the Sea
- Timeline, History, Military history, and Economic history of Venice
- The Patrician series
- Lists of 4X & business-simulation video games
