= Conquered Kingdoms =

1992 video game

- Developer(s): Quantum Quality Productions
- Publisher(s): Quantum Quality Productions
- Platform(s): PC DOS/MS-DOS
- Release: 1992
- Genre(s): Strategy

Conquered Kingdoms is a fantasy strategy computer game developed by Quantum Quality Productions for PC DOS/MS-DOS in 1992.

== Plot ==
The player commands human and fantasy units, using them to seize more territory, and players gain points by occupying other towns, obtaining castles, and triumphing over enemy units.

== Development ==
The game was announced at the 1992 Consumer Electronics Show, alongside Battles of Destiny.

== Reception ==
Conquered Kingdoms was reviewed in 1993 in Dragon #194 by Hartley, Patricia, and Kirk Lesser in "The Role of Computers" column. The reviewers gave the game 4 out of 5 stars. In a 1993 survey of pre 20th-century strategy games, Computer Gaming World gave the game two-plus stars out of five, stating "While gameplay is high, this reviewer admits to a distaste for obscuring decent wargames with fantasy elements". A reviewer who called Conquered Kingdoms "a gem of a game" disliked Scenario Disk #1, stating that the expansion's maps were not as good as the original's.
