= Solitaire's Journey =

1992 video game

- Developer: Quantum Quality Productions
- Publisher: Quantum Quality Productions
- Platforms: Amiga, MS-DOS
- Release: NA: 1992
- Genres: Card, puzzle

Solitaire's Journey is a collection of video card games that developed and published by Quantum Quality Productions. It was released in 1992 for Amiga and MS-DOS.

== Gameplay ==
Solitaire's Journey includes a variety of solitaire games, which can be played in the campaign style of either transcontinental trip or haunted house.

== Development ==
Solitaire's Journey was designed by Andrew Visscher, who pitched it as an "unsolicited submission" to Quantum Quality Productions.

== Reception ==
Allen L. Greenberg reviewed the game for Computer Gaming World, and stated that "Journey will prove an effective way of satisfying that primal appetite for entertainment."

According to Computer Gaming World, Solitaire's Journey was a commercial success. Jeff Koke reviewed Solitaire's Journey in Pyramid #1 (May/June, 1993), and stated that "This is not the type of game that eats your brain for 10 hours a day, but it's not meant to be. Instead it's a game that provides a new twist on a very old pastime, and does it admirably."

In 1996, Computer Gaming World declared Solitaire's Journey the 72nd-best computer game ever released.
