= The Grandest Fleet =

1993 video game

- Developer: Fogstone Enterprises
- Publisher: Quantum Quality Productions
- Platform: MS-DOS
- Release: 1993
- Genre: Turn-based tactics
- Modes: Single-player, multiplayer

The Grandest Fleet is a turn-based naval tactics game developed by Fogstone Enterprises for MS-DOS and published by Quantum Quality Productions in 1993.

== Gameplay ==
The Grandest Fleet involves turn-based combat between opposing forces. Players also need to control and build up coastal cities to increase income, obtain ship building capabilities, and earn victory points.

The game includes a random map generator as well as numerous modern historical, fictional, and what-if naval battles from World War I to the fall of the Soviet Union.

Players can also pursue a "career" by earning points over the course of many games. These points can be used to purchase naval and civilian ranks which allow the player to bring in a personal super aircraft carrier flagship into all games. The ability of the player's flagship depends on the player's rank.

== Reception ==
Computer Gaming World rated The Grandest Fleet ("a game, and not a simulation") four stars out of five. Approving of its "replayability and variety", the magazine concluded that "most gamers should find [it] well worth the time and effort". It was later a nominee for the magazine's 1994 "Strategy Game of the Year" award, which ultimately went to UFO: Enemy Unknown. The editors wrote of Fleet, "The game goes beyond The Lost Admiral with a solid economic model, brisk scenarios, and demanding naval campaign."
