= Andrew Greenberg =

American game designer

- Occupation: Game designer
- Years active: 1991–present
- Notable work: Vampire: The Masquerade; Mage: The Ascension; Fading Suns; Final Liberation

Andrew Greenberg is a game designer of tabletop role-playing games and role-playing video games.

== Career ==
Greenberg was one of White Wolf Publishing's original developers on Vampire: The Masquerade (1991). He was the line editor for Vampire, and as one of the early World of Darkness developers, he helped develop the look and tone of that series. He authored the supplement Chicago by Night. After years with White Wolf, he joined Holistic Design, Inc. (HDI), where he co-created Fading Suns (1996) with Bill Bridges. Greenberg managed video game development at Holistic and worked on computer games such as Emperor of the Fading Suns and Mall Tycoon. He was a co-writer of Dracula Unleashed. Greenberg produced the second edition of the role-playing game Rapture: The Second Coming (2002), which incorporated a d20 System.

Greenberg helped found the Mythic Imagination Institute and is co-chair of the Mythic Journeys convention. In 2007, he began teaching video game design classes at the Art Institute of Atlanta.

== Sources ==
- Appelcline, Shannon (2011). Designers & Dragons. Mongoose Publishing. ISBN 978-1-907702-58-7.
