= Quantum Quality Productions =

Quantum Quality Productions (also known by their initials QQP) was a computer games company specializing in strategy games and war games.

Run by Bruce Williams Zaccagnino and Mark Baldwin it produced a number of games that achieved "cult status", most prominently The Perfect General.

Computer Gaming World reported in March 1994 that QQP was as "a very satisfying wellspring of entertainment", although its "fine games" had "below average documentation". In 1994, due to financial difficulties, QQP accepted a buy-out from American Laser Games. ALG "unceremoniously" closed the studio in December 1995, according to Computer Game Review.

== Partial list of games produced by QQP ==
- Battles in Time
- Battles of Destiny
- Bridge Olympiad
- Conquered Kingdoms
- Dealer's Choice Collection
- Erben des Throns
- Grandest Fleet
- Heirs to the Throne (German import)
- Lucky's Casino Adventure
- Lost Admiral
- Merchant Prince
- Perfect General II
- Perfect General
- Pure Wargame
- Solitaire's Journey
- The Red Crystal: The Seven Secrets of Life
- WWII: Battles of the South Pacific
- Zig Zag
