= Emperor of the Fading Suns =

1997 video game

- Developer: Holistic Design
- Publisher: SegaSoft
- Platform: Microsoft Windows
- Release: NA: January 23, 1997
- Genres: Turn-based strategy, 4X
- Modes: Single-player, multiplayer

Emperor of the Fading Suns is a turn-based strategy 4X video game developed by Holistic Design, based on their in-house role-playing game setting Fading Suns. It was released for Microsoft Windows in January 1997.

The game had a wide array of units and a complex back-story but was rushed to market and released with numerous severe flaws and several features underdeveloped. After official support ended, numerous unofficial, fan-made mods continued to be released. On October 19, 2020, it was made available on GOG.com.

== Gameplay ==
The game is played on a galactic map and specific planet maps. Planet maps use a hexa-grid system for movement. Individual units and buildings take up a single grid space. Several menus handle diplomacy, chat, and documentation. In the game, the player controls a feudal lord of a noble house amongst the ruins of a galactic empire. The player must battle other noble houses and rally enough support to be crowned Emperor of the galaxy. The player can start as one of five houses; each has its own advantages and disadvantages. During game setup, the player can customize their house, taking some negative traits such as insanity in exchange for more positive traits, like having all the player's units start out better trained. Each house starts on its respective home planet, and houses starting on temperate planets have an early-game advantage over houses that start on frozen or jungle planets. There are several non-player groups in the game, including the Symbiots, Vau, the Guild, and the Church. In total, there are forty-three planets that can be explored, colonized, and fought over.

== Reception ==
Reception

Review score
Publication	Score
PC Gamer (US)	75%

Next Generation rated it four stars out of five, and stated that "With everything from basic combat to diplomatic backstabbing, Emperor of the Fading Suns has a depth of play that is worthy of a classic strategy game." Personal Computer Magazine described the game as "destined to be a classic" in their 1997 review, but also noted that the game suffered from bugs.

== Reviews ==
- Gamezilla (1997)
- GameSpot (Mar 25, 1997)
- The Duelist #14
- The Duelist (August 1997)

== Legacy ==
After the end-of-support by the developer, the fan-community took over the support by creating player-made unofficial patches for the game. These try to fix bugs and/or enhance the game by adding new units and balancing out old ones (modding). For example, the "Hyperion patch" makes it possible for the Symbiots to build additional organic spaceships, so they are not stranded on their home planet if their initial fleet is destroyed.
