= Machiavelli (board game) =

Board wargame published in 1977

- Cover of original Battleline edition, 1977, also used by Avalon Hill in 1980
- Designers: S. Craig Taylor and James B. Wood
- Publication: 1977
- Players: 4-8
- Setup time: 5-10 minutes
- Playing time: 4-12 hours
- Chance: None-Low
- Age range: 12+
- Skills: Tactics; Strategy; Psychology; Negotiation

Machiavelli is a board game published by Battleline Publications in 1977. Set in Renaissance Italy, the board is controlled by the Republic of Florence, the Republic of Venice, the Duchy of Milan, the Kingdom of Naples, the Papacy, Valois France, Habsburg Austria, and the Ottoman Turks.

The game shares most of the basic rules of its predecessor Diplomacy, and introduces many new rules such as money, bribery, three seasons per year, garrisons, and random events such as plague and famine. It features scenarios tailored for as little as four and as many as eight players.

== Overview ==
Machiavelli is designed to be played by a group of 4 to 8 players. Each one of the players controls one of the available powers.

The game board is a map of the Italian Peninsula and its nearby countries, including the southeast of France, Switzerland, Austria, Hungary, the coasts of the Adriatic Sea, Tunis, and the Mediterranean islands Corsica and Sardinia. The board is divided in 73 different areas. There are two types of areas: provinces and seas. Some of the provinces have a city, that in some cases can be fortified. Some of these fortified cities have a port.

Each player has a set of tokens that represent three types of military units: armies, fleets and garrisons. All of a player's tokens have the same color. Also, the game includes other tokens, such as assassination tokens, rebellion tokens, famine tokens and ducats, the coinage in Machiavelli.

Machiavelli includes two 6-sided dice that are used only with some optional or advanced rules, such as natural disasters or assassinations.

The game includes a rulebook and eight cheatsheets, one for each player.

== Playing the game ==
To win a game of Machiavelli, a player must get the control of a certain number of provinces before the other players. Usually, the game ends when a player gets the control of 15 provinces, though a longer game can be agreed in which the winner needs to control half of the provinces (i.e. 23 provinces).

A game is divided in years and each year in three seasons (spring, summer and fall). Each season is, in fact, a game turn. The turns of all the players are played simultaneously; they must secretly write down their orders and these orders are read aloud when all the players have finished. This system makes Machiavelli a suitable game to play by mail.

The rule book describes four official scenarios that explain the initial setup of the military units of each player.

In the basic game, in which no advanced or optional rules are applied, every year is played by the following sequence:

1. Spring
  1. Update the control of provinces
  2. Adjust military units
  3. Diplomacy
  4. Orders writing
  5. Conflict resolution
  6. Retreats
2. Summer
  1. Diplomacy
  2. Orders writing
  3. Conflict resolution
  4. Retreats
3. Fall
  1. Diplomacy
  2. Orders writing
  3. Conflict resolution
  4. Retreats

In the orders writing phase, the player can assign an order to each one of his units. The available orders are Hold, Advance, Besiege, Support and Convoy.

The advanced game adds the following rules:

- Finances
- Expenses, including bribes
- Rebellions
- Assassinations

Also there are some optional rules to make the game more fun and add some randomness:

- Excommunication (1995 edition only)
- Natural disasters (famine and plague)
- Special units
- Strategic movement (1995 edition only)
- Money lenders
- Conquest

Avalon Hill's 1995 edition with cover art by Kurt Miller

== Publication history ==
Machiavelli was designed by S. Craig Taylor and James B. Wood, and released commercially in 1977 by Battleline Publications.

In 1980 Battleline was taken over by Avalon Hill, who subsequently republished the game under their logo but using the same cover art as the Battleline edition.

In 1995, Avalon Hill reissued the game with new cover art by Kurt Miller.

== Reception ==
In Issue 38 of Moves, Steve Ulberg and Steve Curley found the game "both interesting and highly playable. Negotiation-type games are particularly enjoyable, as there is little 'dead time': all players are constantly involved, whether in negotiating or watching to see the result of their best-laid plans." Ulberg and Curley did warn "For the player who truly desires to control his own fate, there is probably a little too much luck in Machiavelli; however, this random element does accurately simulate the uncertain nature of warfare in Renaissance Italy, and so Machiavelli is surprisingly 'realistic,' considering the simplistic combat system." The pair concluded, "This is an easy game to learn, a tough game to win, and an exciting game to play. In our opinion, it is one of the best multi-player games around."

John Jackson commented, "Machiavelli is a somewhat more complex game than Diplomacy and while there is more chance involved, there are more options, more variety, and more scope for decision making."

In the 1980 book The Complete Book of Wargames, game designer Jon Freeman liked the components, commenting, "Machiavelli is one of the most attractive games available; color is rampant, and the counters, each with the particular emblem of the country involved, are spectacular." He did note one issue, saying, "The only major lack is a system for handling religion, a prime motivating factor of the times." Freeman found the game was well-balanced — perhaps too well-balanced. "In most of the scenarios — especially those with fewer players — an initial period of land-grabbing is followed by endless turns of stalemate, as most countries assume positions of unmovable strength. In essence the game is too well balanced, and only an unusual change of fortune can move it." Freeman gave this game an Overall Evaluation of "Good", concluding, "Yet Machiavelli is still good fun."

In Issue 7 of Zone of Control, Ed Ericson called this game "basically Diplomacy with some modifications and lots of advanced and optional rules to adapt the system to Renaissance Italy. As such, there's not a whole lot that is dramatically new." Despite this, Ericson found the game "a nuanced, tangled affair in which eight roughly equal powers repeatedly make (and break) alliances in desperate efforts to secure peace and prosperity ... by dominating everyone else." Ericson concluded, "Historical accidents and the balance of power thwart the ambitions of even the most talented Prince. In other words, it's painfully hard to win."

Machiavelli was chosen for inclusion in the 2007 book Hobby Games: The 100 Best. Mike Breault explained "With all this depth, richness, and historical context, Machiavelli's gameplay still flows smoothly and swiftly along. It's a tribute to its outstanding design and development that Machiavelli works so well on so many levels. From a basic rule set that itself surpasses any other game of its type, multiple gameplay-enhancing layers can be added as desired, to weave a tapestry of intrigue and interaction unrivaled in hobby games."
