= Fading Suns =

Tabletop role-playing game

- Fading Suns (2nd edition) cover
- Designers: Bill Bridges, Andrew Greenberg
- Publishers: Holistic Design, Inc.
- Publication: 1996 (1st edition); 1999 (2nd edition); 2001 (d20 edition); 2007 (2nd edition Revised Rulebook); 2012 (Revised edition - Player's Guide); 2013 (Revised edition - Game Master's Guide); 2020 (3rd edition)
- Genres: Science fiction
- Systems: Victory Point System, d20 System

Fading Suns is a science fiction space opera role-playing game introduced in 1997. It is published by Ulisses Spiele and previously until 2016 by Holistic Design. The setting also features in a PC game (Emperor of the Fading Suns), a live action role-playing game (Passion Play), and a space combat miniature game (Noble Armada).

== History ==
After their success with computer game Machiavelli the Prince, Holistic Design looked to try something new - a space strategy computer game, which ultimately became Emperor of the Fading Suns (1996). Holistic commissioned Andrew Greenberg and Bill Bridges to use their world building experience to create a universe for the game, which would also be used as the setting for a tabletop role-playing game to be released simultaneously. Greenberg and Bridges had previously helped define the style of White Wolf Publishing's World of Darkness and, according to Shannon Appelcline, people noticed this game's similarity to the "White Wolf style". Appelcline comments further: "Fading Suns is unique mainly for its distinctive setting. It is a hard science-fiction game, but much of the universe has fallen back to Medieval technology: noble houses, guilds and a monolithic church control most of the power in the universe. Many people compare the universe to that of Frank Herbert's Dune, though Bridges points to Gene Wolfe's The Book of the New Sun, Isaac Asimov's Foundation and others as his inspiration." Fading Suns was well supported with supplements for a few years and in that time the line sold well. Holistic released the table-top miniatures game Noble Armada (1998), which was designed by Ken Lightner and Chris Wiese as a spaceship combat game intended to be compatible with Fading Suns. Passion Play (1999) was a live action role-playing game for Fading Suns. Holistic published a d20 version of Fading Suns (2001), and published their later Fading Suns supplements with dual sets of statistics to use them for both d20 and their own "Victory Point System". Over the next few years, Holistic announced that they were working on a third edition of Fading Suns, as well as new games which would have been designed using the d20 Modern rules and explored different periods in the history of Fading Suns, none of which were released. In 2007, Holistic Design licensed Fading Suns to the publisher RedBrick, and in 2012, the license passed to FASA Games, Inc, which released a revised edition of Fading Suns later that year. In 2014, FASA Games announced they would be releasing a new version of Noble Armada. In 2016, Holistic Design licensed the publishing rights for Fading Suns to German publisher Ulisses Spiele, who announced they were planning a new edition, with products published in both English and German. FASA Games retained the license for Noble Armada products and miniatures.

== Game setting ==
The action is set in the Known Worlds, a future medieval-analogue empire built on the remains of a previous, more sophisticated human space-faring civilization made possible by ancient "jumpgates". The jumpgates are relics left by the mysterious Anunnaki, an ancient civilization (or civilizations) which seem to have influenced the evolution of lesser species, such as humans, for their own end, and waged a devastating war many millennia ago using them as tools and weapons.

The atmosphere is strongly reminiscent of Frank Herbert's Dune and of the Hyperion stories by Dan Simmons, but is influenced by many other science fiction and horror books and movies as well, including the Cthulhu Mythos. The Known Worlds are a very superstitious and dangerous place.

Power is administered by five major Noble Houses, five major guilds within the Merchants League, and six major sects of the Universal Church of the Celestial Sun.

Although many role-playing scenarios are shaped by the strict codes and regulations governing everyday life within the empire, the Imperial Age offers numerous opportunities for adventure. Following the collapse of the old regime and centuries of darkness and warfare, most worlds have experienced technological decline, leaving them at a level comparable to 21st-century Earth. Beyond the borders of the Known Worlds, several alien threats pose ongoing dangers to humanity. These include the mutagenic Symbiots, the ancient and mysterious Vau, and the barbarian empires of the Kurgan and Vuldrok, each waiting for an opportunity to plunge humanity back into chaos and darkness.

Players can take the role of either a member of a Noble House, of one of the various merchant guilds, or a member of one of the numerous religious sects. A number of alien species, most notably the human-like 'psychic' Ukar and Obun, and the six-limbed, bestial Vorox, are also available as player characters.

Two separate types of occult abilities exist within the game universe: psychic powers and Theurgy. Psychic powers manifest, generally, from the practitioners' own mental abilities. Psionicists, castigated as 'demon worshippers' and heretics, are often hunted down and killed by the Church, or enrolled in the Church's ranks (after a good bit of 're-training'). Theurgy is a kind of ordained divine sorcery practiced by the Church through various approved rites and is capable of producing miracles, often by calling on the assistance of various saints and angels.

A large library of supplements provides descriptions of locales (planets, space stations, whole sections of space), alien societies, minor houses, guilds and sects, monsters and secret conspiracies, thus expanding the thematic possibilities offered by the setting.

== Game system ==
The Fading Suns engine uses a simple attribute and skill, level and classless, single d20-powered system, called the Victory Point System (VPS). The second edition of the game's rules solved many issues raised by the earlier rule book, while increasing the amount of data available. The current Revised Edition further updated and streamlined the VPS mechanics.

While generally stereotypical in their template-like form, characters are easily personalized through either life path or points-buy systems.

In 1999, Holistic Design has released a LARP version of Fading Suns entitled Passion Play.

In 2000, an adaptation of the setting to the popular third edition OGL system was also published - D20 Fading Suns. For several years, supplements carried rules for both systems.

Fading Suns: Pax Alexis is the fourth edition, helmed by original writer Bill Bridges and published by Ulisses Spiele in 2020 via a Kickstarter campaign.

== Authors ==
Fading Suns was written by Andrew Greenberg and Bill Bridges, known for their involvement with the original Vampire: The Masquerade and Werewolf: The Apocalypse role-playing games, both games published by White Wolf Publishing.

== Reception ==
Andy Butcher reviewed Fading Suns for Arcane magazine, rating it an 8 out of 10 overall, and stated that "Fading Suns is an impressive and well put together game, with a unique background that sets it apart from the other sci-fi games currently available. If you're looking for a darker future for your players, this is worth the money."

In the August 1997 edition of Dragon (Issue 238), Rick Swan liked the somber setting, but criticized the task resolution system: "Inexplicably, the designers pile on the numbers, adding stuff like effect dice, effect numbers, and complementary actions, all of which are intended to make task resolution more realistic, but just make it more confusing." However, Swan liked the rest of the game, and gave it a rating of 5 out of 6, saying, "Although Fading Suns fails to scale the heights of Traveller — the setting isn't as rich, and the rules, though solid, aren't nearly as elegant — it succeeds on its own terms, evoking a vividly imagined future where street smarts count more than computer literacy, where betrayal and despair are more common than sunshine. With nearly 50 pages of background to digest, it's not the easiest game to get into. But for players who like a little anguish with their space opera, it's worth the effort."

In his 2023 book Monsters, Aliens, and Holes in the Ground, RPG historian Stu Horvath commented that Fading Suns inspired several later videogames, pointing out, "In addition to Mass Effect, there are glimmers of Fading Suns in other science fiction videogames, like StarCraft and the Dead Space series."

== Other reviews and commentary ==
- Review in Shadis #29
- Backstab #37
- Pyramid #24
- Syfy (d20)
- Realms of Fantasy
