= Holistic Design =

Game publisher

Holistic Design, Inc. (HDI), is an American game company.

It was founded in 1992 as Several Dudes Holistic Gaming. The company has developed many computer games in its history, including Battles of Destiny, Hammer of the Gods, Final Liberation, Merchant Prince series, Emperor of the Fading Suns, and Mall Tycoon. HDI also has a number of miniatures games in its inventory, including Noble Armada, Carnage and Combat Zone.

Their most famous product is perhaps its role-playing game Fading Suns, but they also have a number of other RPGs to their credit, such as Rapture: The Second Coming, and their Real-Life Roleplaying series covering Afghanistan, Colombia, Somalia, and the FBI. In 2011, the company entered into an arrangement with RedBrick to continue the creation and publication of Fading Suns as a tabletop RPG. The company also announced a tablet game called Noble Armada which has not yet been released.

In 2014, the company made arrangements for FASA Games to continue the same arrangement, which has produced a new core rulebook with plans for reprinting old ones. Only one of the original partners is still with the company, Ken Lightner, though the other current partners bring a broad array of game design skills to the firm, most notably Bill Bridges, Andrew Greenberg and Chris Wiese.
