= List of D6 System books =

List of D6 System books is a listing of commercially released books from West End Games, its successors, and licensees for the D6 System role-playing game. This does not include various free downloads, fan-made works or forthcoming releases. Accessories such as card decks, screens and miniatures are also not listed. All books are print editions unless noted as otherwise.

- Ghostbusters: A Frightfully Cheerful Roleplaying Game (1986)
  - Ghost Toasties w/GM Screen (1986)
  - Hot Rods of the Gods (1986)
  - Scared Stiffs (1987)
  - Ghostbusters International (1989)
  - ApoKERMIS Now! (1989)
  - Ghostbusters II - The Adventure w/GM Screen (1989)
  - Tobin's Spirit Guide (1989)
  - Lurid Tales of Doom (1990)
  - Pumpkin Patch Panic (1990)
- The Star Wars Roleplaying Game (1987)
  - The Star Wars Sourcebook (1987)
  - Campaign Pack (1988)
  - Tatooine Manhunt (1988)
  - Imperial Sourcebook (1988)
  - Strike Force: Shantipole (1988)
  - Battle for the Golden Sun (1988)
  - Starfall (1989)
  - Otherspace (1989)
  - Otherspace II: Invasion
  - Scavenger Hunt (1989)
  - Riders of the Maelstrom (1989)
  - Crisis on Cloud City (1989)
  - The Far Orbit Project (1998)
  - Black Ice
  - The Game Chambers of Questal
  - Domain of Evil (1991)
  - The Isis Coordinates (1990)
  - Death in the Undercity
  - Rebel Alliance Sourcebook (1989)
  - Graveyard of Alderaan (1989)
  - Death Star Technical Companion (1991)
  - Cracken's Rebel Field Guide
  - Flashpoint! Brak Sector (1995)
  - The Rules Companion
  - Galaxy Guide 1: A New Hope
  - Galaxy Guide 2: Yavin and Bespin
  - Galaxy Guide 3: The Empire Strikes Back
  - Galaxy Guide 4: Alien Races
  - Galaxy Guide 5: The Return of the Jedi
  - Galaxy Guide 6: Tramp Freighters
  - Galaxy Guide 7: Mos Eisley
  - Galaxy Guide 8: Scouts
  - Galaxy Guide 9: Fragments from the Rim
  - Galaxy Guide 10: Bounty Hunters
  - Galaxy Guide 11: Criminal Organizations
  - Galaxy Guide 12: Aliens - Enemies and Allies
  - Fantastic Technology: Guns and Gear
  - Planets of the Galaxy Volume 1
  - Planets of the Galaxy Volume 2
  - Planets of the Galaxy Volume 3
  - Wanted by Cracken
  - Dark Force Rising Sourcebook
  - Heir to the Empire Sourceook
  - The Last Command Sourcebook
  - Thrawn Trilogy Sourcebook
  - Dark Empire Sourcebook
  - The Movie Trilogy Sourcebook
  - Creatures of the Galaxy
  - Cracken's Rebel Operatives
  - Han Solo and the Corporate Sector Sourcebook
  - Heroes and Rogues
  - Goroth - Slave of the Empire
  - The Planets Collection
  - Platt's Starport Guide
  - Alliance Intelligence Report
  - Hideouts and Strongholds
  - Rules of Engagement: The Rebel SpecForce Handbook
  - Fantastic Technology: Droids
  - Shadows of the Empire Sourcebook
  - Secrets of the Sisar Run
  - Cracken's Threat Dossier
  - Platt's Smugglers Guide
  - Pirates and Privateers
  - Stock Ships
  - Wretched Hive of Scum and Villainy
  - Black Sands of Socorro
  - Fantastic Technology: Personal Gear
  - Alien Encounters
  - Lords of the Expanse
  - The Player's Guide to Tapani
  - The Darkstryder Campaign
  - Darkstryder: Endgame
  - Darkstryder: The Kathol Outback
  - Darkstryder: The Kathol Rift
  - Tales Of The Jedi Sourcebook
  - Gamemaster's Guide
  - Truce At Bakura Sourcebook
  - Jedi Academy Trilogy Sourcebook
  - Movie Trilogy Special Edition Sourcebook
  - The Star Wars Roleplaying Game, 2nd Edition (1992)
  - The Star Wars Roleplaying Game, 2nd Edition Revised & Expanded (1996)
- The D6 System: The Customizable Roleplaying Game (1996)
  - Indiana Jones Adventures (1996)
- Men in Black (1997)
  - The Director's Guide (1997)
  - Aliens Recognition Guide #1 (1997)
  - Introductory Adventure Game (1998)
- The Hercules & Xena Roleplaying Game_{1} (1998)
- DC Universe_{1} (1999)
  - DC Universe Narrator's Screen (1999)
  - Daily Planet Guide to Gotham City, The (2000)
  - Daily Planet Guide to Metropolis, The (2000)
  - Gotham City Sourcebook (2000)
  - JLA Sourcebook (2000)
  - Metropolis Sourcebook (2000)
  - Department of Extranormal Operations Agent Manual, The (2001)
  - Department of Extranormal Operations: Directive on Superpowers (2001)
  - JSA Sourcebook (2001)
  - Magic Handbook (2001)
- Metabarons (2001)
  - Gamemaster Screen (2001)
  - Guidebook #1 - Path of the Warrior (2002)
- Psibertroopers
- D6 Adventure (PDF only, 2003)
  - D6 Adventure Rulebook (2004)
  - Bloodshadows Worldbook (2004)
  - Adventure Locations (2004)
  - Adventure Creatures (2005)
- D6 Space Opera (PDF only, 2003)
  - D6 Space Rulebook (2004)
  - Space Ships (2004)
  - Space Aliens 1 (2005)
  - Fires of Amatsumara Worldbook (2005)
- D6 Fantasy Rulebook (2004)
  - Fantasy: Locations (2004)
  - Fantasy: Creatures (2005)
- Khepera Publishing
  - Godsend Agenda D6
    - Godsend Agenda: Mythos
    - D6 Powers
    - Godsend Agenda: U.S.E.R.'s Most Wanted
    - Godsend Agenda: Godmaker
- West End Games
  - Bill Coffin's Septimus_{2} (2009)

_{1}uses Legend System (aka D6 Prime) variant
_{2}uses OpenD6 -- the D6 System, released under OGL v1.0
