= Star Wars Instant Adventures =

Tabletop space opera role-playing game supplement

Star Wars
Instant Adventures
- Cover art by Lucasfilm
- Designers: Tim O'Brien; Peter Schweighofer; George Strayton; Paul Sudlow; Eric S. Trautmann; Floyd Wesel
- Publishers: West End Games
- Publication: 1997; 29 years ago
- Genres: Space opera
- Systems: D6 System
- ISBN: 978-0874312935

Instant Adventures is an anthology of short adventures published by West End Games (WEG) in 1997 for Star Wars: The Roleplaying Game, itself based on the Star Wars franchise.

== Description ==
Star Wars Instant Adventures is a collection of nine short adventure scenarios for the Star Wars role-playing game that can be added to a campaign, introduced as a link between other adventures, or used anytime the gamemaster needs a short interlude. The book also includes 32 full-color adventure cards that provide illustrations of some of the ships, vehicles and aliens and people encountered in the scenarios.

The adventures include:

- "The Argovia Strike" by Paul Sudlow
- "Agent Nallok is Missing" by Peter Schweighofer
- "Heavy Lifting" by Floyd Wesel
- "Into the Heat of Battle" by Peter Schweighofer
- "Family Problems" by Floyd Wesel
- "Meltdown" by George Strayton
- "New Recruits and Rebel Guns" by Peter Schweighofer
- "The Treasure of Celis Mott" by Timothy S. O'Brien
- "Operation: Shadowstrike" by Eric Trautmann

== Publication history ==
In 1987, to celebrate the 10th anniversary of Star Wars, Lucasfilm licensed WEG to produce a role-playing game based on the first three Star Wars movies. The result was Star Wars: The Roleplaying Game, which used the same D6 System created for their Ghostbusters role-playing game in 1986. This was updated by a second edition in 1992 that expanded to use material from Star Wars novels being written by Timothy Zahn and others. In 1997, WEG published Instant Adventures, a 64-page book with adventures written by six different authors, with interior art by Mike Chen, Paul Daly, Ray Lederer, Christopher Trevas, Christina Wald, and Loston Wallace, and cover art by Lucasfilm. Adventure card illustrations were done by Robert Duchlinski, Brian Schomburg, Christopher Trevas, and Christina Wald.

== Reception ==
Andrew Rilstone reviewed Star Wars Instant Adventures for Arcane magazine, rating it a 7 out of 10 overall, and stated that "In short, Star Wars Instant Adventures does exactly what it says on the label."

In the December 1997 edition of Dragon (#242), Rick Swan liked the idea of "bite-sized adventures [...] each playable in an afternoon." He particularly liked "Agent Nallok is Missing" by Peter Schweighofer. Swan concluded, "Add a set of 32 reference cards (bound in the back of the book), and you've got a keeper."
