= Operation: Elrood =

Operation: Elrood is a 1996 role-playing game adventure published by West End Games for Star Wars: The Roleplaying Game.

== Plot summary ==
Operation: Elrood is an adventure in which Radell Mining Corporation, painted as relatively benign, becomes the target of an aggressive takeover by the malevolent Imperial Mining Ltd.—whose tactics include hiring pirates and orchestrating bombings. The Rebel Alliance, lured by the promise of critical resources, allies with Radell, only to have their initial operatives kidnapped. That is when player characters get involved. Despite its corporate setup, the adventure escalates, featuring space dragons, planetary crises, and high-stakes confrontations. Other moments include a planet littered with derelict starships ruled by someone with a palace made from a salvaged Walker, encounters in a tranquil "thinking garden" disrupted by violence, and a livestock delivery to an alien zoo.

== Reception ==
Andrew Rilstone reviewed Operation: Elrood for Arcane magazine, rating it an 8 out of 10 overall, and stated that "There is varied action set across many worlds, lots of aliens and far-fetched environments, chases, fire fights, even a spot of gladiatorial combat and, inevitably, a climax involving a huge space ship going bang. This is very much what a Star Wars scenario ought to be."

== Reviews ==
- Fractal Spectrum (Issue 17 - Winter 1997)
