= 1988 Origins Award winners =

The following are the winners of the 15th annual (1988) Origins Award, presented at Origins 1989:

Category	Winner	Company
Best Pre-20th Century Board Game	Gettysburg	The Avalon Hill Game Company
Best 1900-1946 Board Game	Kremlin	The Avalon Hill Game Company
Best 1947-Modern-Day Board Game	The Hunt for Red October	TSR
Best Fantasy / Sci-Fi	Sky Galleons of Mars	GDW
Best Graphic Presentation of a Board Game	Sky Galleons of Mars	GDW
Best Play-By-Mail Game	Kings & Things	Andon Games
Best Role-Playing Game	GURPS Basic Set, 3rd Edition	Steve Jackson Games
Best Role-Playing Game Adventure	Star Wars: Battle for the Golden Sun	West End Games
Best Role-Playing Supplement	GURPS Space	Steve Jackson Games
Best Graphic Presentation of an RPG	Call of Cthulhu: Petersen’s Field Guide to Cthulhu Monsters	Chaosium
Best Historical Miniatures Series	1200AD Line - The Aztec Army	Ral Partha
Best Fantasy / Sci-Fi Miniatures Series	TSR’s AD&D Series	Ral Partha
Best Vehicular Miniatures Series	BattleTech Mechs	Ral Partha
Best Miniatures Rules	To the Sound of the Guns	GDW
Best Fantasy / Sci-Fi Computer Game	Pool of Radiance	Strategic Simulations
Best Military / Strategy Computer Game	F-19 Stealth Fighter	Microprose
Best Screen Graphics in a Home Computer Game	F-19 Stealth Fighter	Microprose
Best Professional Adventure Gaming Magazine	Strategy & Tactics	3W
Best Amateur Adventure Gaming Magazine	Sorcerer’s Scroll	Tori Berquist
