= Scott Palter =

American game designer (died 2020)

- Died: February 17, 2020
- Occupation: Game designer

Daniel Scott Palter (died February 17, 2020) was a game designer who worked primarily on wargames and role-playing games.

== Early life and education ==
Palter was educated at Dartmouth, where he obtained a Bachelor of Arts, and from Stanford where he obtained a JD in 1972. He joined the New York State Bar before working at his family's company, Bucci Imports, an importer of Italian shoes and accessories. Prior to founding West End Games, Palter was also involved in the playtesting of wargames for several publishers, such as Simulation Publications, the RAND Corporation, Morningside Games, among others.

== West End Games ==
In 1974, Palter used some of the financial resources of Bucci Imports to found West End Games (WEG) in New York. Initially, WEG published wargames, including some of Palter's own designs such as Marlborough at Blenheim (1979).

In 1983, Palter hired Ken Rolston, Eric Goldberg and Greg Costikyan as game designers, and WEG's focus turned away from traditional wargames. Costikyan's 1983 game Bug-Eyed Monsters brought WEG into the science-fiction and fantasy genres. Then Costikyan and Goldberg brought Palter a manuscript for a role-playing game that originally had been conceived by their friend Dan Gelber. Palter agreed to buy the rights to the game, and after some editing and polishing by Rolston, it was released at Gencon in 1984 as WEG's first role-playing game, Paranoia. In 1985, Paranoia won WEG an Origins Award for "Best Roleplaying Rules of 1984".

In 1986, Palter was able to acquire the license from Columbia Pictures to produce an RPG based on the popular film Ghostbusters. WEG's game designers created a new rules system for Ghostbusters: A Frightfully Cheerful Roleplaying Game that used only six-sided dice rather than the polyhedral dice favored by other role-playing game companies. WEG would use this D6 System for many of their licensed products.

In January 1987, again using funds from Bucci Imports, WEG was able to purchase the games license for Star Wars, and immediately published Star Wars: The Roleplaying Game. Later that year, Greg Costikyan and Eric Goldberg left WEG after a disagreement with Palter.

Experiencing high expenses and low margins, Palter made the decision in 1988 to move WEG from New York to the more rural Honesdale, Pennsylvania.

In 1990, WEG released a new role-playing game, Torg. Palter liked the game's system of dice and cards and decided to develop a new generic games rules system called Masterbook. Palter used this new system for in a series of licensed role-playing adaptions of popular franchises: Indiana Jones, Necroscope, Species, Tales from the Crypt, Tank Girl, The World of Aden, and WEG's final product, the Hercules & Xena Roleplaying Game.

The finances of WEG and the Bucci Retail Group were complex and intertwined; when Bucci filed for bankruptcy in 1998, it was a huge blow to WEG's cash flow. According to one WEG employee, Palter announced to employees on July 2, 1998, that he would be unable to pay them the following week, and that all WEG employees were terminated immediately. That same week, Palter confirmed plans to file for a Chapter 11 reorganization of the company's finances. As a result, LucasFilm pulled their Star Wars license, selling it to rival Wizards of the Coast. Former WEG designers Costikyan and Goldberg took Palter to court over ownership of Paranoia, and in 2000, the courts ruled that the license should revert to Costikyan and Goldberg.

== Yeti Entertainment ==
Palter looked for someone to bail the company out, and on March 23, 1999 he announced that the French company Yeti Entertainment (itself owned by Humanoids Publishing) had purchased West End, creating a new entity called D6 Legends Inc. After a court-supervised sale of WEG products and assets to pay off debts, Yeti purchased West End's remaining intellectual property and trademarks, as well as licensing contracts for Indiana Jones, Star Wars and Xena, and brought in Palter in to manage them. Palter announced that D6 Legends would be publishing a third edition of Paranoia and a Bug Sector supplement, but these were never released. Palter was able to acquire the role-playing game license to DC Comics and D6 Legends was able to publish the DC Universe Roleplaying Game (1999).

In 2001, Palter oversaw the release of The Metabarons Roleplaying Game based on the French-language Jodoverse comic books created by Alexandro Jodorowsky. The project was a commercial failure, and Humanoids Publications decided to exit from the role-playing game market. Subsequently, Palter was let go.

== Final Sword Productions ==
Palter immediately founded Final Sword Productions. Humanoids announced a "West End Games House Systems" license, and their first licensee was Palter; he soon put out a mecha game called Psibertroopers (2002).

Other products included the aerial combat board game Battle Skies, the Changeverse role-playing game (based on S.M. Stirling's Emberverse novels), and various Honorverse tactical board game products (based on the military science fiction novels of David Weber).

=== Novelist ===
In 2017, although suffering from recurring bouts of serious illness, Palter used Final Sword Productions to publish his alternate history novel, The Reich Without Hitler: The Falcons of Malta, set in a world where in June 1940, Hitler dies accidentally while returning to Berlin after signing the Armistice with France at Compiègne. The following year, Palter published a science fiction novel, Dead Night of Space: The Hybrid Crew (2018). His final novel, Reich without Hitler: Deaths on the Nile (2019), was a sequel to his first book. Palter was writing the third novel in his Reich without Hitler series when he fell ill and died on February 17, 2020.
