= Star Wars Live-Action Adventures Gamemaster Toolkit =

Star Wars Live-Action Adventures Gamemaster Toolkit is a 1996 role-playing game supplement published by West End Games for Star Wars: The Roleplaying Game.

== Contents ==
Star Wars Live-Action Adventures Gamemaster Toolkit is a supplement in which the "referee’s primer" section offers practical advice for running freeform games, including alternatives to dice-based skill resolution. The described setting is Old Mynock Freeport, with four fully developed scenarios anchored there, built on familiar Star Wars tropes—apprentice force users, corrupted Jedi, and techno-mystical curiosities.

== Reception ==
Andrew Rilstone reviewed Star Wars Live-Action Adventures Gamemaster Toolkit for Arcane magazine, rating it an 8 out of 10 overall, and stated that "What you need is clear, well described characters with solid, easily grasped goals, and that is what this book provides."
