= Starfall (Star Wars: The Roleplaying Game) =

Tabletop fantasy role-playing game supplement

Star Wars
Starfall
- Designers: Rob Jenkins; Michael Stern
- Publishers: West End Games
- Publication: 1989; 37 years ago
- Genres: Space opera
- Systems: D6 System
- ISBN: 978-0874311051

Starfall is a role-playing adventure published by West End Games in 1989 for Star Wars: The Roleplaying Game, which itself is based on Star Wars.

== Plot summary ==
In Starfall, the players take on the roles of Rebels who are being held prisoner aboard a Star Destroyer. They are given a chance to escape when an attack damages the ship, but must also take with them and safeguard an important Rebel, Walex Bissel.

== Publication history ==
Starfall was written by Rob Jenkins and Michael Stern, and was published by West End Games in 1989 as an 40-page booklet that also included a large color map of the Star Destroyer, and two cardboard counter sheets. It was later reprinted with Strike Force: Shantipole and The Game Chambers of Questal in Classic Adventures Vol 5 for the 2nd Revised and Expanded edition in 1998.

== Reception ==
Stewart Wieck reviewed Starfall in White Wolf #15 (April/May 1989), rating it a 3 out of 5 and stated that "I was very skeptical of this adventure when I first read the premise [...] but the adventure turned out to be well balanced and fit some role-playing encounters in between the action."

In the March 1990 edition of Dragon (Issue #155), Jim Bambra complimented "the copious background information provided in the text [that] makes it easy for the GM to run this adventure even when the Rebels head off in totally unexpected directions." Bambra also noted that "Much of this information is reusable, further adding to the usefulness of this adventure." He concluded with a strong recommendation, commenting, "It does an excellent job of turning scenes from the movies into a good slice of adventure gaming."

== Other recognition ==
A copy of Starfall is held in the collection of the Strong National Museum of Play (object 110.2604).
