= Star Wars Introductory Adventure Game =

- Publisher: West End Games
- Publication date: 1997

Star Wars Introductory Adventure Game is a 1997 role-playing game supplement published by West End Games for Star Wars: The Roleplaying Game.

== Contents ==
Star Wars Introductory Adventure Game is a supplement in which the design is meant for absolute beginners. It begins with a "Player's Book", offering a filled-in character sheet and a solo scenario of just 12 paragraphs. This approach mimics a skilled referee walking a player through the basics—players are dropped into situations, prompted to make decisions, and learn rules like a blaster attack only when they are needed. The rest of the book introduces character generation and skill roles, building understanding gradually. As players move to the "Adventure Book", the experience expands into a six-scenario campaign. The story follows a rebel group surviving an Imperial assault and trying to reach their headquarters, with an of escalation in both narrative and player resources: a land speeder is a coveted prize early on, and later scenes involve salvaging gear from a capital ship teetering over a cliff. Mechanically, the game introduces opposed roles and difficulty ratings slowly, providing clarity and confidence for the novice. Sidebars explain concepts, boxouts offer practical advice (like sound effects and how to challenge players without punishing them).

== Reception ==
Andrew Rilstone reviewed Star Wars Introductory Adventure Game for Arcane magazine, rating it a 9 out of 10 overall, and stated that "This is one of the best intros to RPGs I've ever seen. If you have a non-roleplaying friend or a younger brother or sister who you want to corrupt, your best bet is still to take them along to the club or run a scenario for them yourself. But if that isn't possible, then this would make a great birthday present. And you can always nick the maps and cards for your own дате...” "

== Reviews ==
- Fractal Spectrum (Issue 16 - Summer 1997)
- Casus Belli #105
- Pyramid (Issue 26 - Jul 1997)
