= Star Wars Gamemaster Screen, Revised =

Role-playing game supplement

Star Wars Gamemaster Screen, Revised is a 1996 role-playing game supplement published by West End Games for Star Wars: The Roleplaying Game.

== Contents ==
Star Wars Gamemaster Screen, Revised is a supplement in which a sturdy fold-out cardboard barrier is designed to hide the gamemaster's notes. Printed on both sides, it also provides quick reference info for players, such as item costs, saving time and table space. Accompanying this screen is a 64-page booklet filled with useful materials for the gamemaster, including skill summaries, starship stats, standard character profiles, a timeline of the Star Wars universe, and fresh character templates.

== Reception ==
Andrew Rilstone reviewed Star Wars Gamemaster Screen Revised for Arcane magazine, rating it a 4 out of 10 overall, and stated that "And all for only [the price]."

== Reviews ==
- Casus Belli #102
- Fractal Spectrum (Issue 15 - Spring 1997)
- Ringbote (Issue 13 - Jul/Aug 1997)
