= The Kathol Rift =

Tabletop space opera role-playing game supplement

Star Wars: The DarkStryder Campaign
The Kathol Rift
- Cover art by Douglas Shuler
- Publishers: West End Games
- Publication: 1996; 30 years ago
- Genres: Space opera
- Systems: D6 System
- ISBN: 978-0874312737

The Kathol Rift is a series of adventures published by West End Games (WEG) in 1996 for the science fiction role-playing game Star Wars: The Roleplaying Game, itself based on the Star Wars franchise. It is the second set of adventures in The DarkStryder Campaign.

== Description ==
In The Darkstryder Campaign, the crew of the New Republic ship FarStar are pursuing Imperial Moff Sarne. This chase now leads them to the dangerous Kathol Rift. This book contains five scenarios that bring this campaign arc to a close: (Note: Due to a continuity error, the back cover states that it contains six adventures; however only five adventures are actually present in the book.)

- Harm's Way: The FarStar must visit an abandoned science outpost to replenish food supplies.
- Rogue Element: The ship faces mutiny.
- Waystation: A team is sent to explore a mysterious structure.
- Home: A passenger native to a planet the ship is visiting starts to change.
- Showdown: The ship responds to a distress call from a seemingly uninhabited planet.

== Publication history ==
Game historian Shannon Appelcline, in the 2014 book Designers & Dragons: The '80s, noted that after West End Games published a second edition of the Star Wars role-playing game in 1992, "The Star Wars line was even enjoying something of a renaissance, with some innovative material going to press, notably the DarkStryder Campaign (1996), which took a darker look at the Star Wars universe." This boxed set was followed by the sequel The Kathol Rift, a 96-page book designed by Chris Doyle, Anthony P. Russo, Lisa Smedmane, George R. Strayton, and Paul Sudlow, with interior art by Storn A. Cook, Dan Day, David Day, Tim Eldred, Ray Lederer, Christopher J. Trevas, and Michael Vilardi, and cover art by Zoltán Boros and Gábor Szikszai. It was published by WEG in 1996.

== Reception ==
In Issue 234 of Dragon (November 1996), Rick Swan found that some of the encounters were underdeveloped, and the tone was uneven, which he ascribed to the large number of people on the design team. He also noted the high lethality of the adventures, warning that players should have "a tolerance for dead player characters." Despite this, he recommended Kathol Rift as "a solid collection", although "Familiarity with the [previously published] Darkstryder box is mandatory." He concluded by giving this book an above average rating of 5 out of 6.

In Issue 10 of Arcane (September 1996), Andrew Rilstone noted that these adventures are very character driven, and will demand much from the players, saying, "It features complex, multi-layered plots which push the envelope of roleplaying scenario design and still gives you a good chance to shoot some Stormtroopers." Rilstone gave a nuanced recommendation, asking, "Will the referee really be able to keep track of exactly how the complicated plot impacts on this exceptionally large cast of characters? If the answer is yes, then I strongly recommend this book." He concluded by giving the book an average rating of 7 out of 10.

== Reviews ==
- Australian Realms #30
