= Endgame (Star Wars: The Roleplaying Game) =

Tabletop space opera role-playing game supplement

Star Wars
Endgame
- Designers: Timothy O’Brien; George Strayton; Eric S. Trautmann
- Publishers: West End Games
- Publication: 1996; 30 years ago
- Genres: Space opera
- Systems: D6 System
- ISBN: 0874312876

Endgame is an adventure published by West End Games in 1996 for the science-fiction role-playing game Star Wars: The Roleplaying Game.

== Plot summary ==
Endgame, by Timothy O’Brien, George Strayton, and Eric S. Trautmann, is the fourth and last part of The Darkstryder Campaign. The crew of the spaceship FarStar — which is featured in the first three chapters of the campaign — continues to seek the truth as this adventure brings the entire campaign to a conclusion, and reveals secrets of the Darkstryder homeworld.

== Reception ==
In the January 1997 edition of Arcane (Issue #15), Andrew Rilstone thought this book had good and bad points. On the bad side, Rilstone found it very pre-plotted, with the players railroaded through certain situations, various incidents of deus ex machina, and the gamemaster forced to keep certain non-player characters alive so they can move certain plot points forward later in the adventure. He also thought that the adventure was too ambitious, and would place a strain on both gamemaster and players to be able meet those ambitions. On the plus side, Rilstone enjoyed its epic sweep, and "It also ties the plot threads together into a satisfying conclusion, and the secret of Darkstryder is sufficiently interesting to make the extremely long, journey to discover it seem worthwhile." He concluded by giving the book an above average rating of 8 out of 10, saying, "if you played the whole thing right through - you might just find that you'd played in a RPG that felt more like Star Wars than the actual movies."

In the August 1997 edition of Dragon (Issue #238), Rick Swan called Endgame a "must-buy". He agreed that $18 made the book relatively expensive, but said, "So skip a few pizzas; the most engaging Star Wars campaign to date is worth the money."
