= The Politics of Contraband =

Star Wars role-playing game supplement

- Designers: Gary Haynes, Paul Arden Lidberg, Brian J. Murphy, William Olmesdahl, Eric S. Trautmann
- Publishers: West End Games
- Publication: 1992
- Systems: d6

The Politics of Contraband is a 1992 role-playing supplement for Star Wars: The Roleplaying Game published by West End Games.

== Contents ==
The Politics of Contraband is a supplement in which five brief adventures are intended for smuggler player characters.

== Summary ==
This was a 1992 Star Wars roleplaying game supplement. It is now out of print.

== Reception ==
Chris Hind reviewed The Politics of Contraband in White Wolf No. 35 (March/April 1993), rating it a 4 out of 5 and stated that "The Politics of Contraband contains above-average adventures for smugglers, free traders, and (with a little modification) most other character types."

== Reviews ==
- Dragon #199 (Nov. 1993)
- InQuest Gamer #9
