= Shadows of the Empire Sourcebook =

Tabletop space opera role-playing game supplement

Shadows of the Empire Sourcebook is a 1996 role-playing game supplement published by West End Games for Star Wars: The Roleplaying Game.

== Contents ==
Shadows of the Empire Sourcebook is a supplement in which the novel Shadows of the Empire is adapted into playable content. Set between The Empire Strikes Back and Return of the Jedi, it centers on Prince Xizor, a formidable crime lord and rising figure in the Emperor's court, who schemes to eliminate Luke Skywalker and frame Darth Vader to usurp him. The book provides statistics blocks and game details for novel characters like Xizor's bodyguard Guri, who has 10D Martial Arts, as well as new ships like the Stinger and updated specifications for familiar vehicles such as the Millennium Falcon. Beyond character and ship stats, it explores Xizor's criminal syndicate, The Black Sun, offers a glimpse into the Emperor's throneworld, and even details Darth Vader's private fortress.

== Reception ==
Andrew Rilstone reviewed Shadows of the Empire Sourcebook for Arcane magazine, rating it a 5 out of 10 overall, and stated that "It's possible that some people will find that information about the Emperor's throneworld, to say nothing of a description of the castle which is Darth Vader's home, does not diminish the magic of the Star Wars mythos. If, and only if, you are one of those people, you might enjoy Shadows of the Empire."

== Reviews ==
- Envoyer (Issue 1 - Nov 1996)
