= Star Wars Classic Adventures Volume Three =

Star Wars Classic Adventures Volume Three is a 1996 role-playing game adventure published by West End Games for Star Wars: The Roleplaying Game.

== Plot summary ==
Star Wars Classic Adventures Volume Three is an adventure in which three previously released scenarios are updated to align with second edition rules:

- "Tatooine Manhunt" launches players into a pursuit of Adar Tallon, a legendary rebel believed dead. The chase draws bounty hunters from across the galaxy and drags the player characters through locales like the Mos Eisley Cantina and the perilous Jundland Wastes.
- "Riders of the Maelstrom" dumps the party onto a star-cruiser teeming with corruption. What begins as luxury soon turns into danger, as imperial Moffs conspire and pirates strike, plunging the characters into high-stakes espionage.
- "Death in the Undercity" unfolds on the Mon Calamari homeworld, where a vital floating city is targeted by sabotage. After a botched shuttle approach and a politically charged double murder accusation, the PCs must unravel a conspiracy and dodge a lynch mob.

== Reception ==
Andrew Rilstone reviewed Star Wars Classic Adventures Volume Three for Arcane magazine, rating it a 7 out of 10 overall, and stated that "Chases, explosions, far-fetched locations, a fair smattering of double-crossing and intrigue. These scenarios recapture the flavour of the Star Wars movies well. They're very well explained, if a bit too contrived. Good value for any Star Wars referee."

== Reviews ==
- Dragon #234 (Oct., 1996)
