= No Disintegrations =

- Publisher: West End Games
- Publication date: April 1, 1997
- ISBN: 9780874312966

No Disintegrations is a 1997 role-playing game adventure published by West End Games for Star Wars: The Roleplaying Game.

== Plot summary ==
No Disintegrations is an adventure in which five scenarios are tailored for campaigns where all players assume the role of bounty hunters. These adventures allow players to engage in missions like rescuing a crime lord's bride-to-be, retrieving a sacred artifact, and executing hits on criminals such as terrorists and murderers.

== Reception ==
Andrew Rilstone reviewed No Disintegrations for Arcane magazine, rating it a 7 out of 10 overall, and stated that "Traveller and D&D characters used to spend most of their time hanging around bars hoping that mysterious 'patrons' would give them missions. And that's what bounty hunters will be doing, too. Typical player characters in typical RPG adventures. It may say Star Wars on the cover of this adventure pack, but most of these adventures could be happening anywhere."

== Reviews ==
- Casus Belli #105
- Shadis #40
