= Pirates & Privateers =

Tabletop space opera role-playing game supplement

- Publishers: West End Games
- Publication: 1997; 28 years ago
- Genres: Space opera
- Systems: D6 System
- ISBN: 0874312949

Pirates & Privateers is a 1997 role-playing game supplement published by West End Games for Star Wars: The Roleplaying Game.

== Contents ==
As the title implies, Pirates & Privateers is a supplement about both space pirates as well as privateers whose activities have been sanctioned by a government or faction.

== Reception ==
Andrew Rilstone reviewed Pirates and Privateers for Arcane magazine, rating it an 8 out of 10 overall, and stated that "it's mostly background information — if you want to run a pirate campaign, this book will give you all the starships, weapons, NPCs and settings you could need - but it won't tell you how to run one if you like the idea but aren't sure how to go about it. That said, this is the best Star Wars supplement I've seen in a while."

The reviewer from Pyramid #28 (Nov./Dec., 1997) stated that "I had heard good things about this book before I received it, and I have to say that the buzz on the streets was correct. The new Star Wars: Pirates & Privateers is a great book for many different kinds of campaigns. You might wonder why at first, but trust me it's worth a read if you are a Star Wars gamer."
