= Galaxy Guide 2: Yavin and Bespin =

Tabletop space opera role-playing game supplement

Galaxy Guide 2
Yavin and Bespin
- Designers: Jonatha Caspian; Christopher Kubasik; Bill Slavicsek; C.J. Tramontana
- Publishers: West End Games
- Publication: 1989; 36 years ago
- Genres: Space opera
- Systems: D6 System
- ISBN: 0874311268

Galaxy Guide 2: Yavin and Bespin is a supplement published by West End Games in 1989 for the science fiction role-playing game Star Wars: The Roleplaying Game, which itself is based on Star Wars.

== Description ==
From 1989 to 1995, West End Games published twelve "Galaxy Guide" supplements. Galaxy Guide 2: Yavin and Bespin is the second of these, and describes two planets: the Rebellion-held ruins on the forest planet Yavin, and the Cloud City and mines of the planet Bespin. Unlike its predecessor, Galaxy Guide 1: A New Hope, this guide does not present the details of characters found in the film. Instead, it gives details of the two planetary systems, important sites, and the native life forms.

== Publication history ==
Galaxy Guide 2: Yavin and Bespin was written by Jonatha Caspian, Christopher Kubasik, Bill Slavicsek, and C.J. Tramontana, and published by West End Games in 1989 as an 80-page book. In 1995, with the publication of the second edition of Star Wars: The Roleplaying Game, West End Games released second editions of all the Galaxy Guides, including Galaxy Guide 2.

== Reception ==
In the March 1990 edition of Dragon (Issue #155), Jim Bambra thought this book was well-written. He liked the mixture of "colorful vignettes and factual, game-oriented information, making it easy to absorb and fun to read." Bambra concluded that with its "eye to detail and entertaining writing styles, the Galaxy Guide provides an excellent source of reference and background material for the Star Wars universe."

In the June 1990 edition of Dragon (Issue #230), Rick Swan reviewed the second edition of Galaxy Guide 2 and gave it a high recommendation, saying, "Packed with blueprints, anecdotes, and campaign ideas, the book's a banquet for gamemasters and players alike.

== Reviews ==
- Casus Belli #62 (1991)
