= Tales of the Jedi Companion =

- Publisher: West End Games
- Publication date: 1996
- ISBN: 0-87431-289-2

Tales of the Jedi Companion is a 1996 role-playing game supplement published by West End Games for Star Wars: The Roleplaying Game.

== Contents ==
Tales of the Jedi Companion is a supplement in which the Tales of the Jedi comic series is the basis, and explores events set 4,000 years before the original film. It presents a time when space travel was slower, blasters had not been invented, and Jedi wielded pulse wave weapons. Despite the era's supposed peace and justice, the narrative reveals a darker past—some Jedi allied with the Sith and were consumed by a malevolent force even more sinister than the dark side. It includes an exhaustive catalog of characters, weapons, ships, and alien races from the comics.

== Publication history ==
Shannon Appelcline noted that in its final years, "West End Games still had just one successful game, Star Wars – which had just been reprinted in a revised second edition (1996). The Star Wars line was even enjoying something of a renaissance, with some very innovative material going to press, notably the DarkStryder Campaign (1996), which took a darker look at the Star Wars universe. West End was also happily supporting the ever-growing 'expanded universe' by printing books like the Shadows of the Empire Planets Guide (1996) and the Tales of the Jedi Companion (1996)."

== Reception ==
Andrew Rilstone reviewed Tales of the Jedi Companion for Arcane magazine, rating it a 3 out of 10 overall, and stated that "Fans of the comic - and presumably there were some - will possibly find it interesting stuff if they've always hankered to run a game set in that milieu. Aside from that, this is another supplement that's for completists only."

== Reviews ==
- Ringbote (Issue 13 - Jul/Aug 1997)
- Shadis #38
- Casus Belli #101
- Dragon #241
