= Shadows of the Empire Planets Guide =

Shadows of the Empire Planets Guide is a 1996 role-playing game supplement published by West End Games for Star Wars: The Roleplaying Game.

== Contents ==
Shadows of the Empire Planets Guide is a supplement in which concise descriptions are provided for four featured worlds—Rodia, Bothawi, Kothlis, and Vergesso—each with local details and one or more scenario hooks. Rodia is a jungle world linked to Greedo, Bothawi and Kothlis offer insight into the espionage-driven Bothan culture, and Vergesso serves as a chaotic pirate haven perfect for encounters. Overall, the guide combines setting summaries with adventure seeds.

== Publication history ==
Shannon Appelcline noted that in its final years, "West End Games still had just one successful game, Star Wars – which had just been reprinted in a revised second edition (1996). The Star Wars line was even enjoying something of a renaissance, with some very innovative material going to press, notably the DarkStryder Campaign (1996), which took a darker look at the Star Wars universe. West End was also happily supporting the ever-growing 'expanded universe' by printing books like the Shadows of the Empire Planets Guide (1996) and the Tales of the Jedi Companion (1996)."

== Reception ==
Andrew Rilstone reviewed Shadows of the Empire Planets Guide for Arcane magazine, rating it a 6 out of 10 overall, and stated that "It's a nice little book that could form the basis for a fun campaign."

== Reviews ==
- Dragon #238
