= Crisis on Cloud City =

Star Wars RPG adventure

- Cover art by Ralph McQuarrie
- Designers: Christopher Kubasik
- Illustrators: Ralph McQuarrie
- Publishers: West End Games
- Publication: 1989
- Genres: Star Wars

Crisis on Cloud City is a role-playing game adventure published by West End Games (WEG) in 1989 for Star Wars: The Roleplaying Game, itself based on the Star Wars franchise.

== Plot summary ==
Crisis on Cloud City is a role-playing game adventure using the d6 System rules. A simple escort mission takes the player characters to Cloud City, which floats above the planet of Bespin. The adventurers have been tasked with making a routine presentation of a prototype droid, but instead find themselves embroiled in a dark tale, accused of theft and murder. A chase across the city ensues as they strive to prove their innocence. The six chapters of the adventure involve a crazy super-droid, an Imperial spy and a virus. A cut-out deck of cards and a printed set of rules introduce the game Sabacc, which the players must play during the adventure.

== Publication history ==
West End Games acquired the game license for Star Wars in 1987, and published Star Wars: The Roleplaying Game, which largely used the rules for WEG's previously published Ghostbusters RPG. Several supplements and adventures followed, including 1989's Crisis on Cloud City, a 40-page book written by Christopher Kubasik, with a cover by Ralph McQuarrie. A French language version translated by Jean Balczesak, Crise dans la Cité des Nuages, was published by Descartes Editeur in 1993.

== Reception ==
In Issue 25 of Southern Enclave, Debbie Kittle thought the only good thing about this adventure was the included game of Sabacc, writing, "It's a lot of fun. It's frustrating — just when you have a winning hand (sabacc or close to it), your hand can change and you hope the other person doesn't call. I love it."

In Issue 14 of the British games magazine Games International, Lee Brimmicombe-Wood disagreed that Sabacc was the best thing about this adventurer, noting "an excessive random element appears to constantly mess up the bidding. However, I'm sure that enterprising referees can ... introduce a greater element of skill and bluff." Concerning the actual adventure, Brimmicombe-Wood questioned whether it even belonged in the Star Wars universe, pointing out "though Crisis on Cloud City tries to be a little different, it ends up being a little closer to horror or cyberpunk film than the true spirit of Star Wars ... There are some good ideas and the plot flows along quite smoothly, but the horror element, however mild, ruins much of the scenario's flavour and may have to be excised by the referee to stay true to the Star Wars feel." Brimmicombe-Wood concluded by giving the adventure a rating of only 4 out of 10, writing, "The [Sabacc] card deck and West End's usual excellent production make Crisis an attractive package. I just wonder, though, when they are going to bring out more scenarios that ring true to the Star Wars universe, and don't just ape other SF games and themes."

In Issue 2 of Diary of the Doctor Who Role-Playing Game, Nick Seidler recommended Crisis in Cloud City as an adventure that could be easily adapted to the Doctor Who Roleplaying Game, saying "The players come to the interesting setting of Star Wars' Cloud City to meet a scientist and his new droid ... Take the plot, the characters, the maps, and disregard the mechanics of the system."

== Reviews ==
- Games Review (Volume 2, Issue 9 - Jun 1990)
