= The Abduction of Crying Dawn Singer =

The Abduction of Crying Dawn Singer is a 1992 role-playing adventure for Star Wars: The Roleplaying Game published by West End Games.

== Plot summary ==
The Abduction of Crying Dawn Singer is an adventure in which Crying Dawn Singer is kidnapped and the Rebellion is blamed.

== Reception ==
Chris Hind reviewed The Abduction of Crying Dawn Singer in White Wolf #33 (Sept./Oct., 1992), rating it a 4 out of 5 and stated that "the problem-solving aspects [...] are handled well - providing an air of mystery without slowing down the action. The single (and very minor) flaw with The Abduction lies in the overly contrived presentation of a certain clue."
