= Galaxy Guide 8: Scouts =

Tabletop space opera role-playing game supplement

Galaxy Guide 8
Scouts
- Designers: William Olmesdahl; Bill Smith
- Publishers: West End Games
- Publication: 1993; 33 years ago
- Genres: Space opera
- Systems: D6 System
- ISBN: 978-0874311884

Galaxy Guide 8: Scouts is a supplement published by West End Games in 1993 for Star Wars: The Roleplaying Game, which is itself based on Star Wars.

== Contents ==
Galaxy Guide 8: Scouts is an 80-page book designed by William Olmesdahl and Bill Smith, with artwork by John Paul Lona and Michael Vilardi. It describes the explorers who make first contact with the inhabitants of newly discovered planets. The book is divided into ten chapters:

1. . "The Scout Service" describes the profession of scouts, whether they be corporate, independent or New Republic scouts.
2. . "The Scout Mentality" then focuses on the advantages and disadvantages of the three types.
3. . "The Border" details the vast unexplored space, and includes a table for generating adventures.
4. . "Exploration Ships" details nine types of space ships.
5. . "Equipment" presents equipment used by scouts.
6. . "Base Explorations" describes typical border posts, colonial bases and military detachments.
7. . "Aliens, Creatures, and Planetary Details" gives a system for gamemasters to quickly create aliens.
8. . "The exploration" presents the steps that scouts have to complete.
9. . "System creation" allows the gamemaster to randomly generate a planet.
10. . "The Jackpot" is a four-part adventure involving a medallion accidentally acquired by one of the player characters.

== Reception ==
In the November 1993 edition of Dragon (Issue #199), Rick Swan liked the chapter on designing space ships, but otherwise was not impressed by this book, calling it "a disappointing effort. The chapter on scout bases barely fills two pages, the guidelines for creating alien species lean too heavily on die-rolls, and the gamemastering tips favor generalities over specifics. (Is the table for random adventure themes — Survival, Exploration/Survey, and so on — intended for the imagination impaired?)" Swan concluded with a thumbs down, saying, "Skip this one."
