= Lords of the Expanse =

Tabletop space opera role-playing game supplement

- Cover art by Brian Schomburg
- Designers: Chris Doyle; Paul Sudlow
- Illustrators: Thomas J. Biondolillo; Tim Bobko; Jacen Burrows; Thomas O'Neill; Christina Wald
- Publishers: West End Games
- Publication: 1997; 29 years ago
- Genres: Space opera
- Systems: D6 System
- ISBN: 978-0874312973

Lords of the Expanse is a supplement published by West End Games (WEG) in 1997 for Star Wars: The Roleplaying Game, itself based on the Star Wars franchise.

== Contents ==
Lords of the Expanse is a guide detailing the Tapani Sector and the political machinations of its noble houses. The boxed set contains:

- an 80-page "Campaign Guide" for the gamemaster that contains suggestions for how to set up a Rebel base of operations, some notable places the player characters can explore, and notable non-player characters. An introductory adventure, "Hunting Grounds", is also included.
- a 72-page "Gamemaster Guide" that outlines political and social organizations, the justice system, and also lists a number of adventure hooks.
- a 48-page "Sector Guide", intended for the players, that gives a short history of the sector, highlights the most influential noble houses, the major planets in the sector, and an overview of ships and equipment.
- a large double-sided map of the sector, character sheets, and 16 character cards.

Players can choose to be a character native to the sector such as a noble, house guard or entrepreneur, in addition to the usual roster of Rebel pilots and soldiers.

== Publication history ==
In 1987, WEG acquired the rights to publish role-playing games about the Star Wars franchise, and Star Wars: The Roleplaying Game was the result. WEG published many supplements and adventures based on the movies and also some of the related novels. Ten years later, WEG tried to breathe new life into the game by introducing a new region of space, the Tapani Sector, as well as a more morally ambiguous background where "a self-ruling network of noble houses ... vie for economic dominance and political control. Treachery and betrayal are not only tolerated, but encouraged."

WEG also released a companion volume, Star Wars Players Guide: Tapani that provided an express summary of the sector's history and the main ruling houses in this region of space, as well as important worlds, extraterrestrial races, and templates for player characters.

== Reception ==
In Issue 243 of Dragon (January 1998), Rick Swan commented that this new setting "succeeds as an inventive fusion of setting and character." Swan thought the "Gamemaster Guide" contained a number of intriguing adventure hooks, and the "Campaign Guide" included "all the elements necessary to get a campaign going." Swan also thought the included adventure was "terrific ... fast-paced and solidly written." However, Swan complained about the lack of an index in the booklets, the lack of enough character sheets and an absence of usable information on the sector map. Despite this, Swan concluded by giving this book a rating of 5 out of 6, saying, "I applaud West End’s efforts to nudge Star Wars in new directions."

In the January 1998 issue of Science Fiction Age, Eric Baker commented, "If your Star Wars: The Roleplaying Game adventures need a little boost, if your players are getting upset because of a lack of the finer things, if you need a new world to set your game on — may we suggest a trip to the Tapani Sector?"

The French games magazine Casus Belli commented "After the good Rebels against the evil Empire, then the smugglers and explorers in space where-no-one-hears-you-roll-the-dice, we have a small galactic sector full of noble houses that hate each other, and political shenanigans. In short, a little Fading Suns ready to be painlessly inserted into your campaign." But the magazine noted, "Ultimately, our Star Wars specialist found Lords of the Expanse 'not bad, but a little disappointing.' Coming from someone who usually idolizes every WEG supplement, this is rather worrying."

In Issue 7 of the French games magazine Backstab, Philippe Tessier was not impressed with the companion volume Star Wars Players Guide: Tapani, giving it a rating of only 6 out of 10, saying, "The overall product is not of very high quality, compared to what West End Games generally produces for Star Wars. It would perhaps have been more useful to devote less space to ship diagrams in order to give more useful information to the players."
