= Han Solo and the Corporate Sector Sourcebook =

Tabletop space opera role-playing game supplement

Han Solo and the Corporate Sector Sourcebook is a 1993 role-playing supplement for Star Wars: The Roleplaying Game published by West End Games.

== Contents ==
Han Solo and the Corporate Sector Sourcebook is a supplement in which life in the Corporate Sector is detailed.

== Reception ==
Scott Haring reviewed Han Solo and the Corporate Sector Sourcebook for Pyramid magazine and stated that "The Han Solo and the Corporate Sector Sourcebook is not quite as good as the Movie Trilogy Sourcebook, mainly because it doesn't have any photos from movies to use as illustration. [...] The coverage is just as excellent as in the Movie Trilogy Sourcebook, though -- every character, no matter how minor; first person accounts (even an 'interview' with Solo conducted by the historian author of the book, Voren Na'al); a complete rundown on all the major companies of the Corporate Sector and how they interact; and complete game stats on all sorts of starships, ground vehicles, weapons, droids and more. This book has less broad appeal than the Movie Trilogy Sourcebook, and will be enjoyed most by Star Wars RPG players wanting to bring the Corporate Sector into their campaigns, and readers who are fans of Daley's novels."

Chris Hind reviewed Han Solo and the Corporate Sector Sourcebook in White Wolf Inphobia #50 (Dec., 1994), rating it a 4.5 out of 5 and stated that "Quite Simply, Han Solo and the Corporate Sector Sourcebook is a great buy."

== Reviews ==
- Rollespilsmagasinet Fønix (Issue 2 - May/June 1994)
