= Supernova (Star Wars: The Roleplaying Game) =

Supernova is a 1993 role-playing adventure for Star Wars: The Roleplaying Game published by West End Games.

== Plot summary ==
Supernova is an adventure in which five short adventures are set in and near the red giant Demophon.

== Reception ==
Chris Hind reviewed Supernova in White Wolf #38 (1993), rating it a 3 out of 5 and stated that "In the end, Supernova is an admirable attempt at linking together a collection of mini-adventures. However, the content of this product was unable to change my low opinion of the mini-adventure in general."

== Reviews ==
- Dragon #199
