= Mission to Lianna =

Mission to Lianna is a 1992 role-playing adventure for Star Wars: The Roleplaying Game published by West End Games.

== Plot summary ==
Mission to Lianna is an adventure in which the player characters go to the planet where TIE Fighters are manufactured to stop the development of a cloaking shield.

== Reception ==
Chris Hind reviewed Mission to Lianna in White Wolf #33 (Sept./Oct., 1992), rating it a 2 out of 5 and stated that "On the whole, I was disappointed. But GMs who need some good layouts and are willing to flesh-out the scenes could still use Mission to Lianna."
