= Death Star Technical Companion =

Tabletop space opera role-playing game supplement

Death Star Technical Companion is a 1991 role-playing supplement for Star Wars: The Roleplaying Game published by West End Games.

== Contents ==
Death Star Technical Companion is a supplement in which the Death Star is described in detail.

== Reception ==
Chris Hind reviewed Death Star Technical Companion in White Wolf #30 (Feb., 1992), rating it a 3 out of 5 and stated that "Death Star Technical Companion's strongest point is its completeness. It contains every important fact concerning the Death Star, without going into excessive detail. GMs of Star Wars find good layouts and descriptions that they can use in their games. This product also has much to offer fans of the movies who are simply curious about the largest armored space station ever created."

== Reviews ==
- Challenge #61
- Excalibur (Year 2, Issue 1 - Feb 1992)
- Papyrus (Issue 16 - April Fools 1995)
- Future Wars - (Issue 30)
