= The Movie Trilogy Sourcebook =

Tabletop space opera role-playing game supplement

- Publisher: West End Games
- Publication date: 1993
- ISBN: 9780874311983

The Movie Trilogy Sourcebook is a 1993 role-playing supplement for Star Wars: The Roleplaying Game published by West End Games.

== Contents ==
The Movie Trilogy Sourcebook is a supplement in which material from previous books is revised and expanded.

== Reception ==
Scott Haring reviewed The Movie Trilogy Sourcebook for Pyramid magazine and stated that "It all makes for very entertaining reading. Couple that with lots of stills taken directly from the movies, and bonuses like full-color reproductions of all the different movie posters and 'concept art' done during each film's pre-production phase, and you've got a package that goes far beyond a mere game supplement. Star Wars fans everywhere will thoroughly enjoy this book, whether they play the RPG or not. And that's why these books are West End's 'franchise' -- they do sell (and quite well, thank you) to a large number of non-gamers."

Chris Hind reviewed The Movie Trilogy Sourcebook in White Wolf #47 (September 1994), rating it a 3 out of 5 and stated that "Unless you already own Galaxy Guides 1, 3 and 5, you should probably buy The Movie Trilogy Sourcebook."

== Reviews ==
- Dragon #203
- Shadis #11
