= Galaxy Guide 12: Aliens - Enemies and Allies =

Tabletop space opera role-playing game supplement

Galaxy Guide 12
Aliens - Enemies and Allies
- Designers: Craig Robert Carey; Douglas S. Carey; Harry L. Heckel IV; Pablo Hidalgo; Jean Rabe; Peter Schweighofer; Lisa Smedman; Trevor J. Wilson
- Publishers: West End Games
- Publication: 1993; 33 years ago
- Genres: Space opera
- Systems: D6 System
- ISBN: 978-0874312638

Galaxy Guide 12: Aliens - Enemies and Allies is a 1993 role-playing game supplement published by West End Games in 1993 for Star Wars: The Roleplaying Game, itself based on the popular Star Wars franchise.

== Contents ==
From 1989 to 1993, West End Games published twelve "Galaxy Guide" supplements. Galaxy Guide 12: Aliens - Enemies and Allies, the final sourcebook in the series, is an 80-page book written by Craig Robert Carey, Douglas S. Carey, Harry L. Heckel IV, Pablo Hidalgo, Jean Rabe, Peter Schweighofer, Lisa Smedman, and Trevor J. Wilson, with artwork by Steve Bryant and Michael Vilardi.

The book provides information about 38 alien species found in the Star Wars universe, including details of their ecology, culture and personalities.

== Reception ==
In the June 1990 edition of Dragon (Issue #230), Rick Swan called Galaxy Guide 12 "a great read and a good resource." However, Swan pointed out that it could have been even better if the authors had included some adventure hooks for gamemasters.
