= Galaxy Guide 3: The Empire Strikes Back =

Tabletop space opera role-playing game supplement

Galaxy Guide 3
The Empire Strikes Back
- First edition cover
- Designers: Michael Stern; Pablo Hidalgo (2nd edition)
- Publishers: West End Games
- Publication: 1989 1st edition (40039); 1997 2nd edition (40125)
- Genres: Space opera
- Systems: D6 System
- ISBN: 0874312663

Galaxy Guide 3: The Empire Strikes Back is a supplement published by West End Games in 1989 for the science fiction role-playing game Star Wars: The Roleplaying Game, which is itself based on Star Wars.

== Description ==
Galaxy Guide 3: The Empire Strikes Back is the third Galaxy Guide supplement, and presents descriptions and game statistics for the characters featured in the film The Empire Strikes Back, with illustrations and detailed histories for each character. The book is presented as report made after the Battle of Hoth by a member of the Rebel Alliance. In addition to an introduction and conclusion, the book is divided into six chapters:

1. . "Hoth Profiles": Report on Imperial Probe Droids, a Wampa, various Imperial troops such as Shock Troop Snow Soldiers and AT-AT Pilots, and detailed profiles of various Rebel characters seen in the movies.
2. . "Imperial Fleet Profiles" presents detailed reports on Imperial officers seen in the movie, as well as Darth Vader.
3. . "The Bounty Hunters" describes the bounty hunters seen in the movie, including Boba Fett and his ship, the Slave I.
4. . "The Swamp Planet" describes Jedi Master Yoda.
5. . "The Bespin Profiles" covers Lando Calrissian and other characters of the Cloud City seen in the movie.
6. . "The Heroes of Yavin" profiles Leia Organa, Han Solo, Luke Skywalker, C-3PO and R2-D2.

== Publication history ==
From 1989 to 1995, West End Games published twelve "Galaxy Guide" supplements. Galaxy Guide 3: The Empire Strikes Back was written by Michael Stern, with illustrations by Michael Manley and Ralph McQuarrie, and published by West End Games in 1989 as an 80-page book.

In 1995, with the publication of the second edition of Star Wars: The Roleplaying Game, West End Games released second editions of all the Galaxy Guides. In Galaxy Guide 3, in addition to updating content to match second edition, the book also added three more chapters: Echo Base, The Battle of Hoth, and Hoth Wastes.

== Reception ==
2nd edition cover by Brian Schomburg

In the March 1990 edition of Dragon (Issue #155), Jim Bambra thought this book was well-written and did "a thorough job of detailing the major and minor characters." He liked the mixture of "colorful vignettes and factual, game-oriented infoirmation, making it easy to absorb and fun to read." Bambra did note that many of the profiled characters had actually been killed in The Empire Strikes Back, "thereby reducing their usefulness as straight role-playing aids"; but he admitted that including them "as a means of elaborating and expanding the Star Wars universe" was very helpful." Bambra concluded that with its "eye to detail and entertaining writing styles, the Galaxy Guide provides an excellent source of reference and background material for the Star Wars universe."

In the August 1997 edition of Dragon (Issue #238), Rick Swan reviewed the second edition of Galaxy Guide 3 and called it "more good stuff for the Star Wars game... Essential reading for role-players wishing to recreate scenes from the film." However, he did warn that the book largely duplicated material found in the previously published Movie Trilogy Sourcebook.

== Reviews ==
- Casus Belli #62 (1991)
