= Cracken's Rebel Field Guide =

Role-playing game supplement

Cracken's Rebel Field Guide is a 1991 role-playing supplement for Star Wars: The Roleplaying Game published by West End Games.

== Contents ==
Cracken's Rebel Field Guide is a supplement in which technology is compiled in catalog form by the Alliance General Airen Cracken.

== Reception ==
Chris Hind reviewed Cracken's Rebel Field Guide in White Wolf #30 (Feb., 1992), rating it a 2 out of 5 and stated that "Considering a GM only uses about half of this product, I can't recommend spending [the price] on what is essentially 40 pages."

== Reviews ==
- Amiga Fun #12
