= Star Wars Adventure Journal =

Roleplaying-game magazine

The Star Wars Adventure Journal was a publication distributed by West End Games between 1994 and 1997. Fifteen issues were printed, containing short stories set in the Star Wars expanded universe by both well-known and relatively unknown Star Wars authors (short stories by author Charlene Newcomb depicting the adventures of Alexandra "Alex" Winger, a one-time love interest of Luke Skywalker); adventures and source material for the West End Games version of the Star Wars role-playing game; Galaxywide NewsNets were fictional news reports from throughout the galaxy; interviews with personalities from all walks of Star Wars literature; and reviews of new and upcoming Star Wars products.

== Published issues ==
- Star Wars Adventure Journal 1
- Star Wars Adventure Journal 2
- Star Wars Adventure Journal 3
- Star Wars Adventure Journal 4
- Star Wars Adventure Journal 5
- Star Wars Adventure Journal 6
- Star Wars Adventure Journal 7
- Star Wars Adventure Journal 8
- Star Wars Adventure Journal 9
- Star Wars Adventure Journal 10
- Star Wars Adventure Journal 11
- Star Wars Adventure Journal 12
- Star Wars Adventure Journal 13
- Star Wars Adventure Journal 14
- Star Wars Adventure Journal 15

== Cancelled issues ==
- Star Wars Adventure Journal 16
- Star Wars Adventure Journal 17
- Star Wars Adventure Journal 18

== Reception ==
Chris Hind reviewed Star Wars Adventure Journal Volume 1, Issue 1 in White Wolf Inphobia #53 (March, 1995), rating it a 3.5 out of 5 and stated that "Thanks to its format, the Adventure Journal is the equivalent of a 140-page, standard product - the equivalent of [a higher priced] value."

Pyramid magazine reviewed Star Wars Adventure Journal and stated that "I've paid twice as much for products with half the substance of one Star Wars Adventure Journal. These books are crammed full of great short stories, Star Wars RPG adventures, great adventure hooks, interesting non-player characters, new ships and equipment, thoughtful source articles, solitaire adventures, interviews, and more."

Andrew Rilstone reviewed The Best of the Star Wars Adventure Journal for Arcane magazine, rating it a 4 out of 10 overall. Rilstone comments that "If you like the writing of Zahn and Tyers, then this book is probably worth having for the fiction; but if it's roleplaying material you are after, there are better things to spend your credits on."
