= JLA Sourcebook =

Role-playing game supplement

JLA Sourcebook is a 2000 role-playing game supplement published by West End Games for DC Universe Roleplaying Game.

== Contents ==
JLA Sourcebook is a supplement in which Justice League characters, equipment, locations, team rosters, bases, and adversaries are detailed, including Young Justice.

== Reviews ==
- Pyramid
- Polyhedron #144
