= Planets of the Galaxy: Volume One =

Tabletop space opera role-playing game supplement

Planets of the Galaxy: Volume One is a 1991 role-playing supplement for Star Wars: The Roleplaying Game published by West End Games.

== Contents ==
Planets of the Galaxy: Volume One is a supplement in which a planet generation system is presented.

== Reception ==
Chris Hind reviewed Planets of the Galaxy: Volume One in White Wolf #32 (July/Aug., 1992), rating it a 3 out of 5 and stated that "If you like the idea of a Planet Generation System, you might consider buying this first volume of Planets of the Galaxy just for that - and the rest of the material is not bad either."

== Reviews ==
- Excalibur (Year 2, Issue 3 — Apr 1992)
