= The Darkstryder Campaign =

Tabletop space opera role-playing game supplement

Star Wars
The Darkstryder Campaign
- Designers: Peter Schweighofer; Doug Shuler; Bill Smith; Eric Trautmann; Timothy Zahn; Daniel Scott Palter; Richard Hawran; Stephen Crane; Paul Sudlow; Pablo Hidalgo; Miranda Horner
- Publishers: West End Games
- Publication: 1996; 29 years ago
- Genres: Space opera
- Systems: D6 System
- ISBN: 0-87431-551-4

The Darkstryder Campaign is an adventure published by West End Games in 1996 for the science fiction role-playing game Star Wars: The Roleplaying Game.

== Publication history ==
Shannon Appelcline, in the 2014 book Designers & Dragons: The '80s, noted that after West End Games published a second edition of the Star Wars role-playing game in 1992, "The Star Wars line was even enjoying something of a renaissance, with some innovative material going to press, notably the DarkStryder Campaign (1996), which took a darker look at the Star Wars universe."

The Darkstryder Campaign is a boxed set that was designed by Peter Schweighofer, Doug Shuler, Bill Smith, Eric Trautmann, Timothy Zahn, Daniel Scott Palter, Richard Hawran, Stephen Crane, Paul Sudlow, Pablo Hidalgo, and Miranda Horner, with illustrations by Tim Bobko, David Day, Terry Pavlet, Brian Schomburg, Philip Tan, David Deltrick, Christopher Moeller, Doug Shuler, and Mike Vilardi.

The boxed set consists of

- 96-page softcover Campaign Book (describes in detail the starship FarStar and its crew)
- 96-page softcover Adventure Book (includes an overview of the Kathol Sector, and six sequentially linked adventures)
- 52 character and ship cards
- a 22’ x 34’ double-sided poster map

== Plot ==
Imperial warlord Moff Sarne has set about to conquer a large part of the galaxy. The players take on the roles of characters who board the decrepit starship FarStar and attempt to track him down.

== Gameplay ==
Players are encouraged to play several pregenerated characters at the same time.

== Reception ==
In the June 1996 edition of Dragon (Issue #230), Rick Swan called this set of adventures "one of the most dramatic turning points in the game's history [...] Forget your cuddly Ewoks, your bumbling droids, your kiddie show aliens. DarkStryder conjures a harsher, drearier universe, a Star Wars for grown-ups." Swan was intrigued by this new darker tone, saying, "The campaign features villains who murder, allies who backstab, and heroes who die. A haze of despair hangs over DarkStryder, which is both intriguing and disturbing. It’s like visiting Oz and finding alcoholic Munchkins." He called the illustrated cards of notable personalities "a nice touch, useful for players and gamemasters alike." He thought the linked adventures were "well-staged and easy-to-run adventures, offering a satisfying blend of action, problem-solving, and role-playing." However, Swan was troubled that the campaign "doesn't really go anywhere; it's all set-up and no climax." He concluded by giving the boxed set an average score of 4 out of 6, saying, "With its unresolved plot lines and unanswered questions, it feels incomplete. The designers still seem to be groping for a style, as if they’re not quite sure how far they can go. Consequently, DarkStryder doesn't plunge Star Wars into darkness; it merely draws the shades a bit. Next time, I hope they throw caution to the wind really go for the grit. For now, DarkStryder stands as a promising beginning, a rich, involving expansion that opens up an RPG on the verge of rusting shut."

== Reviews ==
- Rollespilsmagasinet Fønix (Danish) (Issue 10 - October/November 1995)
- Australian Realms #28
