= Planets of the Galaxy, Volume 2 =

Tabletop space opera role-playing game supplement

- Author: West End Games
- Language: English
- Series: Star Wars: The Roleplaying Game
- Subject: Role-playing game supplement
- Genre: Science fiction
- Publisher: West End Games
- Publication date: 1992
- Publication place: United States
- Media type: Print (softcover)

Planets of the Galaxy, Volume 2 is a 1992 role-playing supplement for Star Wars: The Roleplaying Game published by West End Games.

== Contents ==
Planets of the Galaxy, Volume 2 is a supplement in which eight new planets are detailed.

== Reception ==
Chris Hind reviewed Planets of the Galaxy: Volume Two in White Wolf #34 (Jan./Feb., 1993), rating it a 4 out of 5 and stated that "In the end, Planets of the Galaxy: Volume Two is better than its predecessor (but still with room for improvement), presenting an interesting and diverse selection of the myriad worlds which exist in the Star Wars galaxy."

== Reviews ==
- Dragon 199
