= Galaxy Guide 9: Fragments from the Rim =

Tabletop space opera role-playing game supplement

Galaxy Guide 9: Fragments from the Rim is a 1993 role-playing supplement for Star Wars: The Roleplaying Game published by West End Games.

== Contents ==
Galaxy Guide 9: Fragments from the Rim is a supplement in which ideas and game statistics are provided relating to the Outer Rim Territories.

== Reception ==
Chris Hind reviewed Galaxy Guide 9: Fragments from the Rim in White Wolf #38 (1993), rating it a 4 out of 5 and stated that "I usually dislike 'hodgepodge' sourcebooks. However, Galaxy Guide 9: Fragments from the Rim is a well-designed and highly imaginative compilation of good ideas. Credit should also go to Mike Vilardi, whose interior illustrations go a long way toward bringing the Star Wars galaxy to life."
