= Dark Empire Sourcebook =

Tabletop space opera role-playing game supplement

- Designers: Michael Allen Horne
- Publishers: West End Games
- Publication: 1993; 33 years ago
- Genres: Space opera
- Systems: D6 System
- ISBN: 978-0874311945

Dark Empire Sourcebook is a supplement published by West End Games in 1993 for the science fiction role-playing Star Wars: The Roleplaying Game.

== Contents ==
In 1987, four years after the release of the third (and at the time, the final) Star Wars movie, Return of the Jedi, West End Games published the popular Star Wars: The Roleplaying Game. However, by 1992, having published many supplements and adventures, West End Games was finding it increasingly difficult to create original material out of the original trilogy of movies; they decided to release a second edition of the game based on other material that had been published. The third supplementary sourcebook to be published for the second edition, Dark Empire Sourcebook, is based upon the Dark Empire comic series by Tom Veitch and Cam Kennedy.

Dark Empire Sourcebook is a 126-page softcover book written by Michael Allen Horne and Carol Hutchings, with graphics, illustrations and cover art by John Paul Lona, Dave Dorman and Cam Kennedy. The sourcebook gives biographical profiles of notable personalities from the comics, a brief overview of the history of the New Republic, an essay on the Force, and brief profiles of planets and aliens mentioned in the comics. It also includes a 16-page color insert, and several sidebars covering various incidents.

== Reception ==
In the November 1993 edition of Dragon (Issue #199), Rick Swan called sections of this book "dreary" and found that there was an overlap of material previously published in other second edition sourcebooks. He liked the "imaginative sidebars", which he found to be "competently written and liberally illustrated with artwork from the comics". Overall, Swan thought the book "makes an engaging side trip for players on vacation from the New Republic." He gave Dark Empire Sourcebook an average rating of 4 stars out of 6, saying that "players on a budget" could probably get along without it.

Chris Hind reviewed Dark Empire Sourcebook in White Wolf #38 (1993), rating it a 5 out of 5 and stated that "In summation, the Dark Empire Sourcebook is an excellent adaptation of the Dark Horse Comics series. Those who own the comics will find this product very helpful in setting a campaign during these turbulent times. Other gamemasters will find new thrills and plot ideas. Finally, this beautiful book should make a welcome addition to the collections of Star Wars fans in general."
