= Galaxy Guide 6: Tramp Freighters =

Tabletop space opera role-playing game supplement

Galaxy Guide 6: Tramp Freighters is a 1990 role-playing supplement for Star Wars: The Roleplaying Game published by West End Games.

== Contents ==
Galaxy Guide 6: Tramp Freighters is a supplement in which rules are provided for free trader player characters.

== Reception ==
Chris Hind reviewed Galaxy Guide 6: Tramp Freighters in White Wolf #31 (May/June, 1992), rating it a 5 out of 5 and stated that "I strongly recommend Tramp Freighters. It is self-contained, complete, and filled with Star Wars adventure."

== Reviews ==
- Challenge #52
- Saga (Issue 12 - February 1992)
- The Gamer (Issue 2 - March 1992)
- Voyages to the Worlds of SF Gaming (Issue 15 - 1991)
