= Miranda Horner =

American game designer and editor

- Born: Waukegan, Illinois, United States
- Occupations: Editor, author
- Writing career
- Genres: Role-playing games, fantasy

Miranda Horner is an American game designer and editor who has worked on a number of products for various role-playing games, including Dungeons & Dragons and the Star Wars roleplaying game.

== Biography ==
Miranda Horner was born in Waukegan, Illinois, was raised in Texas, and moved to Kansas City shortly before attending college there. Growing up, she read fantasy books such as TSR's Endless Quest series, and the Dragonlance Chronicles trilogy, and she also watched the Dungeons & Dragons cartoon; this led to an interest in role-playing games. She originally wanted to be an accountant, but after taking classes on Accounting and other business subjects, she decided she would rather study History and English Literature as she wanted to edit fantasy books: "Since TSR was close to my grandparents' house in Illinois, I made it my goal to somehow get into TSR." Horner began making contacts in the gaming industry at Gen Con, and met her future husband Shaun at a role-playing convention.

== Career ==
West End Games hired Horner as an editor in 1994, shortly after she got married. She began working for TSR eight months later. She worked on several Dungeons & Dragons game products from 1996-2000. Horner edited many game books for TSR, particularly for D&D and Dragonlance, and also wrote short stories. She later worked as an editor with the role-playing games R&D group at Wizards of the Coast. After that, she began producing materials for several third-party publishers. In late September 2013, she began working for Steve Jackson Games where she became a managing editor.
