= The Thrawn Trilogy Sourcebook =

Tabletop space opera role-playing game supplement

- Publisher: West End Games
- Publication date: 1996
- ISBN: 0874312809

The Thrawn Trilogy Sourcebook is a 1996 role-playing game supplement published by West End Games for Star Wars: The Roleplaying Game.

== Contents ==
The Thrawn Trilogy Sourcebook is a supplement in which the Thrawn trilogy by Timothy Zahn is adapted into game material. The supplement translates the characters, creatures, locations, and technology from the novels into game-ready stats and schematics, offering insight into rules for Sabaac, background on Kashyyyk, and layouts of places like Mount Tantiss.

== Publication history ==
The Thrawn Trilogy Sourcebook was written by Bill Slavicsek and published by West End Games for Star Wars: The Roleplaying Game.

== Reception ==
Andrew Rilstone reviewed The Thrawn Trilogy Sourcebook for Arcane magazine, rating it a 5 out of 10 overall, and stated that "there is an overwhelming feeling that this is Star Wars at third hand - Bill Slavicsek's version of Timothy Zahn's version of George Lucas' version. The spark, the purity of vision, the sheer oomf that made Star Wars the only good thing to happen in the 1970s has been diluted so much that you can hardly taste it. Shame."

== Reviews ==
- Casus Belli #95
- Dragon #233
