= The Jedi Academy Sourcebook =

Tabletop space opera role-playing game supplement

The Jedi Academy Sourcebook is a 1996 role-playing game supplement published by West End Games for Star Wars: The Roleplaying Game.

== Contents ==
The Jedi Academy Sourcebook is a supplement in which the Jedi Academy trilogy by Kevin J. Anderson is adapted into a roleplaying format. Luke Skywalker trains a new generation of Jedi on Yavin IV, even as a lingering dark presence plots to lure his students to the Dark Side. Simultaneously, Han Solo and Chewbacca are embroiled in a dangerous escapade on Kessel that uncovers an ex-Imperial plan involving a hidden Death Star prototype—tucked deep within a nest of black holes. Poison plots against Mon Mothma and the threat of young Anakin Solo's kidnapping add to the peril and intrigue. It includes setting details, stats for major characters, and visuals like floorplans—including one for Admiral Ackbar's Mon Calamari sea pod.

== Reception ==
Andrew Rilstone reviewed The Jedi Academy Sourcebook for Arcane magazine, rating it a 3 out of 10 overall, and stated that "This is well drawn, well written and well thought-out. But 1 cannot imagine what any roleplayer is going to do with it."

== Reviews ==
- Casus Belli #95
