= Star Wars Gamemaster Kit =

Tabletop space opera role-playing game supplement

Star Wars Gamemaster Kit is a 1991 role-playing adventure for Star Wars: The Roleplaying Game published by West End Games.

== Plot summary ==
Star Wars Gamemaster Kit is an adventure in which a gamemaster's screen accompanies a campaign adventure.

== Reception ==
Chris Hind reviewed Gamemaster Kit in White Wolf #30 (Feb., 1992), rating it a 4 out of 5 and stated that "Overall, the screen is attractive and useful, and the campaign material is top-notch. Every GM should buy the Gamemaster Kit, even if he already owns the Campaign Pack."

== Reviews ==
- Dragon #181
