= Galaxy Guide 4: Alien Races =

Tabletop space opera role-playing game supplement

Galaxy Guide 4: Alien Races is a 1989 role-playing supplement for Star Wars: The Roleplaying Game published by West End Games.

== Contents ==
Galaxy Guide 4: Alien Races is a supplement in which game statistics and descriptions are provided for various alien species.

== Publication history ==
Galaxy Guide 4: Alien Races was written by Troy Denning with Andria Hayday and Stephen D. Sullivan, and published by West End Games in 1990 as an 80-page book.

== Reception ==
Chris Hind reviewed Galaxy Guide 4: Alien Races in White Wolf Inphobia #53 (March, 1995), rating it a 3 out of 5 and stated that "For those who own the first edition of GG4, the second edition's changes probably aren't extensive enough to warrant another purchase. It's not too difficult to work out revised stats. I did so for my favorite race, the Duros, and prefer my stats to those provided by this book."

== Reviews ==
- Voyages to the Worlds of SF Gaming (Issue 11 - Apr 1990)
- Games Review (Volume 2, Issue 9 - Jun 1990)
