= Hercules & Xena Roleplaying Game =

Tabletop fantasy role-playing game

The Hercules & Xena Roleplaying Game is a role-playing game based on the Hercules & Xena TV programs.

== Publication history ==
The Hercules & Xena Roleplaying Game was written and developed by George Strayton and published by West End Games in 1998.

West End Games designed the d6 System (1996) based on its Star Wars: The Roleplaying Game, and from that developed a variant of the system they called "d6 prime", and the first game published to make use of this new d6 prime system was The Hercules & Xena Roleplaying Game (1998), although this game wound up being one of the final publications by West End Games. West End Games had cut its production by late June 1998 to just three d6 lines: Star Wars, Men in Black: The Roleplaying Game and Hercules & Xena.

The Hercules & Xena Roleplaying Game was the last title released by the original West End Games before their bankruptcy, as well as the first to use a modified D6 System based resolution engine that would later be known as the Legend System.

== Reception ==
The reviewer from the online second volume of Pyramid stated that "The Hercules & Xena Roleplaying Game is a good starter game for beginning roleplayers." Chris Doyle, in a review for Inquest, stated that the game "is action packed" and an "excellent game for first-timers" but "a little simplistic for hardcore players".

== Reviews ==
- Casus Belli #115
- Realms of Fantasy
