= Star Wars: Escape from the Death Star =

1990 West End Games board game

Star Wars: Escape From The Death Star is a board game published in 1990 by West End Games.

== Contents ==
Escape From The Death Star is a game in which Luke Skywalker, Han Solo, Princess Leia and Chewbacca attempt to find their way through the vast Death Star's sectors.

== Reception ==
Richard Ashley reviewed Escape From The Death Star for Games International magazine, and gave it a rating of 4 out of 10, and stated that "On the whole, a good try at converting this subject to a solitaire game, but a waste of time as a competitive multiplayer game."
