= Cracken's Threat Dossier =

Supplement for Star Wars: The Roleplaying Game

Cracken's Threat Dossier is a supplement published by West End Games in 1997 for the science fiction role-playing game Star Wars: The Roleplaying Game.

== Description ==
Cracken's Threat Dossier is a 144-page softcover book designed by Drew Campbell, Matt Hong, Timothy S. O’Brien, Jen Seiden, and Eric S. Trautmann, with illustration by Storn Cook, and cover art by Tom O'Neill.

The content is divided into three chapters, each based on novels set in the Star Wars universe:

1. "The Haptan Cluster", based on The Courtship of Princess Leia by Dave Wolverton
2. "The Black Fleet Crisis", based on The Black Fleet Crisis trilogy by Roger MacBride Allen (Before the Storm / Shield of Lies / Tyrant's Test)
3. "Corellian Incident", based on The Corellian Trilogy by Roger MacBride Allen (Ambush at Corellia / Assault at Selonia / Showdown at Centerpoint)

The content is presented as a series of field reports written by the intelligence service of the New Republic. Further information is provided about groups that use the Dark Side of the Force, including the Witches of Dathomir and the Fallani.

== Reception ==
In the June 1998 edition of Dragon (Issue #248), Chris Pramas was not impressed by the design of the book: "The layout attempts to support the text by simulating a datapad, but it severely undermines this tactic by using white and gray text boxes on a black background. Instead of a slick, technological look, Cracken’s Threat Dossier appears more like a cut-and- paste board." Although Pramas was not a fan of the "mediocre" novels on which this supplement is based, he conceded that "As a resource for the GM, Cracken’s Threat Dossier is actually quite good." He concluded by giving the book an average rating of 4 out of 6, saying, "There is a wealth of information in this book that can be used in your Star Wars campaign, especially if your players have become jaded."

== Reviews ==
- Shadis (Issue 42 - Nov 1997)
