= Strike Force: Shantipole =

Tabletop space opera role-playing game supplement

Star Wars: The Roleplaying Game
- Designers: Ken Rolston; Steve Gilbert
- Publishers: West End Games
- Publication: 1988; 37 years ago
- Genres: Space opera
- Systems: D6 System
- ISBN: 978-0874310917

Strike Force: Shantipole is an adventure published by West End Games in 1988 for the space opera role-playing game Star Wars: The Roleplaying Game.

== Plot summary ==
In Strike Force: Shantipole, a rebel group hidden in an asteroid belt and led by Commander Ackbar has developed prototype B-wing fighters. Up to six player characters are tasked with delivering a message to Ackbar. Then as Imperial forces attack the rebel base, the player characters must stall the attack long enough for evacuation to proceed. They then must escort the B-wing fighters to Alliance High Command before the Empire captures or destroys the project.

== Publication history ==
West End Games published the licensed Star Wars: The Roleplaying Game in 1987, and quickly released adventures and supplements for the game. One of these was the adventure Strike Force: Shantipole written by Ken Rolston and Steve Gilbert, and published by West End Games in 1988 as a 32-page book, with a large color map.

== Reception ==
James Wallis reviewed Strike Force: Shantipole for Games International magazine, and stated that "Strike Force: Shantipole runs well as a Star Wars adventure, but it lacks depth and, apart from the new alien race and the upgraded B-Wings it contains little of any great consequence, not even an interesting NPC. All in all, it is a useful package for those who don't want to write their own material for Star Wars but by no means an essential buy." Wallis concluded by giving the game an average rating of 3 1/2 stars out of 5.

In Issue 37 of Challenge, Julia Martin called this "a series of episodes of breath-taking, nonstop adventure in the usual Star Wars style." Martin was impressed by the organization of the adventure, commenting, "the module concentrates on providing a good storyline and useful referee aids. Once more we have a map that we can actually use, and even cues to the referee in the text of the module as to the most opportune times to show it to the players." Martin pointed out that this module was largely set in space, noting, "The adventure itself will make Brash Young Pilots, Smugglers, and other space combat-oriented characters very happy." The only complaint Martin had was that some of the artwork, although excellent, had been used and reused in previous products. Despite this, Martin concluded, "Overall, the module is easily worth its price and will provide many evenings of enjoyment to referees and players of Star Wars alike."

In the March 1990 edition of Dragon (Issue 155), Jim Bambra noted that this adventure "has an excellent Star Wars feel to it. This time around, the vastness of space and an asteroid field are given the star treatment." Bambra commented that the fight for the rebel base is "desperate", and "tensions run high." Bambra concluded, "The action moves swiftly, and the non-player character interaction works well. Strikeforce: Shantipole is another fine Star Wars product."
