= Battle for the Golden Sun =

Tabletop space opera role-playing game supplement

Star Wars
Battle for the Golden Sun
- Cover by Greg Guler and James Bauer
- Designers: Douglas Kaufman
- Publishers: West End Games
- Publication: 1988; 37 years ago
- Genres: Space opera
- Systems: D6 System
- ISBN: 978-0874311037

Battle for the Golden Sun is an adventure published by West End Games in 1988 for the science fiction role-playing game Star Wars: The Roleplaying Game.

== Publication history ==
Battle for the Golden Sun was written by Douglas Kaufman, with a cover by Greg Guler and James Bauer, and illustrations by Jeff Dee, and was published by West End Games in 1988 as a 40-page booklet, a 4-page pamphlet, and a large color map.

== Plot summary ==
This adventure is set on a water planet in the Star Wars universe populated by an alien race that is being threatened by Imperial forces. Part of the adventure takes place underwater.

== Reception ==
Stewart Wieck reviewed Battle for the Golden Sun in White Wolf #15 (April/May 1989), rating it a 4 out of 5 and stated that "This is a good adventure for the 'Star Wars' game [...] many of the classic elements of a good adventure are here [...] The drama is fast-moving and well-coordinated."

In the March 1990 edition of Dragon (Issue #155), Jim Bambra "approached this adventure with high expectations", given that it had been awarded best RPG at the 1988 Origins Awards. However, Bambra was somewhat disappointed in the product. He conceded that it did contain "some nice elements". He liked its use of the Force, saying this was "the best use of the Force in any Star Wars adventure, making the Force an integral part of the story instead of just a means for PCs to employ magical powers." But Bambra was ambivalent about the scripting of the adventure, which was "pretty tight, reducing the options of the player characters, but it moves along nicely and contains some well-staged combat sequences." He was not impressed by the underwater aspect of the adventure, which he felt suffered from a lack of specifics about "how to successfully stage underwater settings." He also felt there were not enough details about either the planet or the alien race. Bambra concluded that the adventure "moves at a rapid pace but at the cost of a more fully realized setting."

== Awards ==
Battle for the Golden Sun won the Origins Award for Best Roleplaying Adventure of 1988.
