= Star Trek: The Adventure Game =

Board game

Star Trek: The Adventure Game is a 1985 board game published by West End Games.

== Gameplay ==
Star Trek: The Adventure Game is a game based on the original Star Trek series, which takes place in the Organian Treaty Zone between the Federation and the Klingon Empire.

== Reception ==
Tony Watson reviewed Star Trek: The Adventure Game in Space Gamer No. 76. Watson commented that "If you like Star Trek, you should get this game. the spirit of the show is captured admirably; all that seeking out of new worlds and civilizations is right there. This is not the game that FGU's Star Explorer (based on a pale imitation of the 'Trek' universe) tried to be, and it's much closer to the series than those 'armadas in space' titles put out by Task Force. This game is entertaining, simple, colorful and a lot of fun . . . not much different from the television series it's based on."

Frederick Paul Kiesche III reviewed Star Trek: The Adventure Game for Different Worlds magazine and stated that "Overall I enjoyed this game. I have, on numerous occasions, found myself without an opponent and I'm sure that others have found themselves in similar situations. I'd recommend this game for those people (instead of use in a two-player situation). I hope that West End comes out with more games of this style; this will certainly fill a welcome niche on my game shelf!"

Phil Frances reviewed Star Trek: The Adventure Game for White Dwarf #81, and stated that "Star Trek: The Adventure Game can be played again and again. There are – even solitaire rules if you need them – this isn't a pushover to play, and I'd rank it with Valley of the Four Winds, Cosmic Encounter and all those other lovable classics."

== Reviews ==
- Games #65
- Analog Science Fiction and Fact
- Game News #6 (Aug., 1985)
