= Western Front Tank Leader =

1987 board game

Western Front Tank Leader is a 1987 board game published by West End Games.

== Gameplay ==
Western Front Tank Leader is a game in which a platoon/company-level tactical game uses command cards to manage movement, combat, and cohesion across variable terrain.

== Reviews ==
- Casus Belli #40
- Jeux & Stratégie #52
