= Star Wars Sourcebook =

Tabletop role-playing game supplement

Star Wars Sourcebook is a supplement published by West End Games (WEG) in 1987 for Star Wars: The Roleplaying Game, itself based on the Star Wars movies.

== Contents ==
Star Wars Sourcebook is a campaign setting and game supplement, featuring art from the film productions. It includes statistics and information for various starships, droids, vehicles and equipment, aliens and other creatures, stormtroopers and rebels, Imperial and rebel bases, and presents statistics for the major film characters such as Luke Skywalker, Princess Leia, Han Solo, and Darth Vader.

== Publication history ==
In 1987, WEG acquired a license from LucasFilm to produce a role-playing game based on the Star Wars franchise. In addition to the role-playing game, WEG also released Star Wars Sourcebook a 144-page hardcover book written by Bill Slavicsek and Curtis Smith.

In the 2014 book Designers & Dragons, games historian Shannon Appelcline noted that in 1986, Bill Slavicsek began working on Star Wars: The Roleplaying Game as developer and editor, then "Early in 1987, Slavicsek was also working on another important release: The Star Wars Sourcebook (1987), which he coauthored with Curtis Smith. This exhaustive sourcebook was one of the first references to really detail the Star Wars universe; even giving the names of some alien races for the first time. In many ways, it marked the start of the Star Wars Expanded Universe. The Sourcebook was released simultaneously with the Star Wars RPG later in the year."

== Reception ==
In Issue 4 of The Games Machine (March 1988), John Woods thought that any Star Wars RPG player would "really need the extra material in The Star Wars Sourcebook, which is packed with information on droids, weapons, aliens, starships and the like, price lists and plans for a rebel base and an Imperial garrison." However, he warned that the background material was far from complete, noting that "Even with the Sourcebook, though, you’ll have to improvise a lot to recreate the universe of the movies. Most notably, there are no star maps or even remotely comprehensive lists of planets." He also called the lack of an index "annoying". Despite these quibbles and the book's relatively high price, he concluded that "The Sourcebook is something of a luxury, but still worthwhile."

In the August 1988 edition of Dragon (Issue #136), Jim Bambra noted the book was "crammed with interesting background on the Star Wars universe." Bambra thought that the material about Imperial Stormtroopers and their equipment was "invaluable, as are the descriptions of the rebel bases." He concluded with a strong recommendation, saying, "With this book, Star Wars: The RPG becomes even better."

== Awards ==
At the 1988 Origins Award, Star Wars Sourcebook won "Best Roleplaying Adventure of 1987".

== Reviews ==
- Challenge #32
- Casus Belli #43 (Feb 1988)
- Jeux et Stratégie #56 (as "Star Wars: Le Guide")
