= Galaxy Guide 1: A New Hope =

Tabletop space opera role-playing game supplement

Galaxy Guide 1
A New Hope
- Designers: Grant Boucher
- Publishers: West End Games
- Publication: 1989; 36 years ago
- Genres: Space opera
- Systems: D6 System
- ISBN: 0-87431-125-X

Galaxy Guide 1: A New Hope is a supplement published by West End Games in 1989 for Star Wars: The Roleplaying Game, which is based on Star Wars.

== Contents ==
Galaxy Guide 1: A New Hope describes the characters and locations featured in the film Star Wars: A New Hope, with illustrations and detailed personal histories provided for each character. This information is given in the form of a report by a rebel named Voren.

The book is divided into an Introduction, followed by five chapters:

1. "The Researcher's Odyssey": A quick summary of events that took place in Star Wars: A New Hope
2. "Tatooine Profiles": Details and descriptions of many characters seen in A New Hope, including Obi-Wan Kenobi, Owen and Beru Lars, Greedo, many clients of the Cantina, and details of the Tusken Raiders, the Jawas, various droids, and the desert stormtroopers.
3. "Death Star Profiles": Details of the various officers aboard the Death Star, including Grand Moff Tarkin, as well as information about the interrogation droid, and the Dianoga monster who inhabits the garbage collector.
4. Yavin Profiles: Description of the Rebel leaders and their troops.
5. "Interviews with the Heroes of Yavin": Interviews with the main characters of the film: Luke Skywalker, Leia Organa, Han Solo and Chewbacca

Gamemasters can use this background to develop a campaign set on Tatooine or Yavin.

== Publication history ==
West End Games published the licensed Star Wars: The Roleplaying Game in 1987. Galaxy Guide 1: A New Hope, released two years later as an 80-page book, was written by Grant Boucher, with artwork by Michael Manley, Ralph McQuarrie, and Al Williamson.

== Reception ==
Stewart Wieck reviewed Star Wars Galaxy Guide 1 in White Wolf #15 (April/May 1989), rating it a 3 out of 5 and called it a "delightful book" and noted the "very carefully detailed backgrounds" of the characters.

In the March 1990 edition of Dragon (Issue #155), Jim Bambra thought this book was well-written and did "a thorough job of detailing the major and minor characters." He liked the mixture of "colorful vignettes and factual, game-oriented infoirmation, making it easy to absorb and fun to read." Bambra did note that many of the characters had actually been killed in the first movie, "thereby reducing their usefulness as straight role-playing aids"; but he admitted that including them "as a means of elaborating and expanding the Star Wars universe" was very helpful. Bambra concluded that with its "eye to detail and entertaining writing styles, the Galaxy Guide provides an excellent source of reference and background material for the Star Wars universe."

== Other recognition ==
A copy of Galaxy Guide 1: A New Hope is held in the collection of the Strong National Museum of Play (object 110.2616).

== Other reviews ==
- Casus Belli #62 (1991)
