= Carbon Grey =

Comic book mini-series

- Cover art for Carbon Grey #1 (April 2011 reprint). Art by Hoang Nguyen, Khari Evans & Kinsun Loh.

Publication information
- Publisher: Image Comics
- Schedule: Monthly (as solicited)
- Format: Ongoing series
- Genre: Epic fantasy/Alternate history
- Publication date: March 2011 to present
- No. of issues: 10
- Main character(s): Giselle Grey; Mathilde Grey; The Wolf General; Alena von Medeim; Dina Cumming

Creative team
- Created by: Hoang Nguyen; Khari Evans; Mike Kennedy
- Written by: Paul Gardner
- Artist(s): Khari Evans, Hoang Nguyen
- Colorist: Kinsun Loh

Carbon Grey is a comic book mini-series created by artist Hoang Nguyen (Punisher: War Zone, Alien Legion), and published by Image Comics. Set against the backdrop of a great war. The series follows twin sisters Mathilde and Giselle Grey, members of a noble family dedicated to protecting the Kaiser of Mitteleuropa, as they struggle to reconcile duty with their own beliefs and ambitions. When the Kaiser is killed a vast conspiracy is uncovered, centered on a prophecy made long ago by Gottfaust, father to the Greys and hero of Mitteleuropa, that the 13th sister – the Carbon Grey – will one day spark a revolution.

== Setting and style ==
Carbon Grey has been variously described as belonging to the steampunk genre, or its subgenre Dieselpunk. Although the series evokes a style and period strongly reminiscent of the First World War there are notable differences, especially in the anachronistic technology (including modern weaponry and aircraft) that populates the world, and later becomes a major plot-point as the series progresses. Nguyen describes the setting of Carbon Grey as a world "a few degrees away from our own."

== Publication history ==
Series creator Hoang Nguyen first conceived of the series in 2002, inspired by a sketch he had drawn of a young female soldier. He began developing the concept further in his spare time, recruiting writer Mike Kennedy (Lone Wolf 2100, Superman: Infinite City, Bleedout) to help flesh out the story. Soon after, artist Khari Evans (Daughters of the Dragon, Thor, Harbinger) joined the project as Principal Artist. Nguyen, Evans and Kennedy are together credited as co-creators. Nguyen found Malaysian painter and colorist Kinsun Loh through online art forum CGTalk, and described the results of a test piece he produced as "spectacular". With Mike Kennedy tied up on other projects Nguyen approached writer Paul Gardner (Afro Samurai, Splatterhouse) to revise the storyline and write the script. The book was picked up by Image Comics at the 2010 WonderCon in San Francisco, after artist Jimmy Palmiotti introduced Nguyen to Image Comics Publisher Eric Stephenson. The first issue shipped in March 2011.

== Volume one: Sisters at War ==
The sisters of the Greys; descendants of Gottfaust – Godlike hero of the nation's Golden Era. For over three hundred years their family have protected and counseled the Kaiser, ruler of Mitteleuropa. The sisters are beautiful, wise and deadly; bred for purity and groomed to perfection. Through generations there have always been three – one for Strength, one for Grace and one for Wisdom. But this is a different time. 1915 - At the beginning of the industrial age a great war is raging. As the myth of glory in battle is cut to ribbons on the frontlines of Mitteleuropa twin sisters - Mathilde and Giselle Grey - come of age. One of these two sisters is the 13th Grey – the Carbon Grey, prophesied by Gottfaust to bring about a renaissance, and restore the nation to glory. Both are flawed - imperfect in different ways. Giselle is disobedient, stubborn - but her faults are hidden. Mathilde does not share the physical perfection of her sisters, something she cannot hide - and an exposed flaw can be exploited. This war is a diversion, orchestrated by the ruthless Alena von Medeim - consort to the Kaiser, and Mitteleuropa's Queen. She conspires to manipulate Mathilde, twisting Gottfaust's prophecy to turn sister against sister - all to gain possession of the Stone, the source of Gottfaust's godlike power. When the Kaiser is murdered Giselle must run, traveling west across the scorched battlefields of Mitteleuropa on a mission to deliver a mysterious letter into the heart of enemy territory. Pursued by the sisters and hunted by the enemy Giselle must discover the prophecy's true meaning before the Cossack queen harnessed the power of the stone to rewrite history itself.

Issue one
Released 2 March 2011
To a noble family twins are born; Mathilde and Giselle, the Sisters Grey. For generations the Sisters have protected and counseled the Kaiser, ruler of Mitteleuropa. But this is a different time. At the birth of the industrial age a great war is raging. When the Kaiser is assassinated Giselle is accused. Pursued by her sisters and hunted by the enemy Giselle must unravel the prophecy of the Carbon Grey before history itself is rewritten.

Issue two
Released 13 April 2011
The General moves to arrest the sisters, as the twins turn to their mentors. The Baron has a hand in Pepper and Dina's escape, and Howard is convinced he is blessed. As the Greys search for Giselle, Eva becomes concerned about her sister's allegiances. Who is manipulating the Kaiser's legacy?

Issue three
Released 25 May 2011
Giselle heads west, as Howard answers a higher calling. The Greys close in on their wayward sister and the General suspects he has been deceived. Mathilde learns that Gottfaust's rock is more than a metaphor. As Arc One draws to a close the truth surrounding the Kaiser's death is revealed...

Vol. 1 trade paperback
A trade paperback of volume one was released on 14 September 2011. Additional content included a scene cut from issue three, and a map of Mitteleuropa.

== Carbon Grey Origins ==
The first volume was followed by spin-off series Carbon Grey Origins, an anthology of short stories set in the larger world of Carbon Grey. These served to flesh out the back-story of a number of important characters. For Carbon Grey Origins the cover price was increased to $3.99. Alongside the established team of Nguyen, Evans, Loh and Gardner the two issues of Origins feature a number of artists and writers new to the series, including Pop Mhan, Joffrey Suarez, Bryan Johnston, Tanya Landsberger and Thomas Redfern.

Issue one
Released 16 November 2011
An anthology of short stories set in the universe of Carbon Grey. A boy becomes a god and two sisters become killers.

Issue two
Released 28 March 2012
A second anthology of short stories set in the Carbon Grey universe. Mysterious events are investigated by "Marshal and Marshall" and a refugee becomes a queen in the tale of "Raisa."

== The Art of Carbon Grey ==
Released 1 February 2012
In December 2011 Image announced The Art of Carbon Grey, a hardcover large-format book detailing, through interviews and pre-production art, the development of the series and the team's working process.

== Volume two: Daughters of Stone ==
The second three-issue volume of Carbon Grey subtitled "Daughters of Stone" launched in July 2012. Although solicited on a monthly schedule, the second and third issues were released in December 2012 and February 2013 respectively. The long delay between issues was attributed by Nguyen to "...scheduling conflicts with other projects."

Issue one
Released 18 July 2012
Months have passed since the events of volume one. By order of the Queen an expedition force sets out in search of the real stone of Gottfaust. Anna hunts down the conspirators behind an assassination attempt on Her Majesty. What has become of the sisters in exile, Eva and Giselle?

Issue two
Released 19 December 2012
In Kernow Lady Fermoy works to unravel the riddle of the Kaiser's letter, while Waldstatten receives a delegation from Her Majesty's homeland. Far away in a desolate outpost on the edge of the Empire Mathilde and her team make a horrific discovery. Is the stone's power more than a myth?

Issue three
Released 27 February 2013
As arc two draws to a close the Queen declares war on her homeland, and things thought long buried return to haunt her. In KOL the true purpose of Giselle's mission is revealed, and both sides realize too late that the power of Gottfaust's stone is not so easily tamed.

Vol. 2 trade paperback
A trade paperback of volume two was released on 2 October 2013. The collection includes all three issues of volume two, along with stories "Raisa" and "Marshal and Marshall" (first published in Carbon Grey Origins #2), and other original material.

== Volume three: Mothers of Revolution ==
The third and final volume of Carbon Grey subtitled "Mothers of Revolution" launched in December 2013.

Issue one
Released 4 December 2013
Long ago, a child fled a revolution. She stole another's name, betrayed a king, took his country to war, and turned sister against sister—all to reclaim her Father's throne. She is Raisa Vasilyeva, illegitimate child of a Czar, Queen of Mitteleuropa, and now... destroyer of all things. The Sisters Grey return for the final devastating chapter of CARBON GREY.

Issue two
Released 15 January 2014
The war, which not long ago was everything, now seems insignificant in the face of the unimaginable destructive power of the stone. But there is still hope, for even as the world unravels, mortal enemies unite and the true meaning of Gottfaust's prophecy is revealed in this, the double-length finale to our EPIC saga.

Vol. 3 trade paperback
A trade paperback for volume three was released on 10 September 2014. The collection includes both issues of volume three, along with stories "A Test of Faith" and "Gottfaust - Man of Stone" (first published in Carbon Grey Origins #1 and #2), and additional new content.

== Translated Editions ==
In Fall 2013 publisher Panini Comics released translated editions of Carbon Grey volume one: Sisters at War. The book was translated into FIGS (French, Italian, German and Spanish).
Panini released translated editions of Carbon Grey volume two: Daughters of Stone in Spring 2014. The book was again translated into FIGS.
Translated editions of Carbon Grey volume three: Mothers of Revolution were published by Panini Comics in May 2015. The final volume was published only in French, German and Italian editions.

== Themes ==
Nguyen has described Carbon Grey as "...a story about the potential in humanity to be creative or destructive", and as "...our creation myth." Other recurring themes include tradition, duty and honor, and the conflict between ideology and pragmatism.

== Characters ==
- The Twins

The twins, Giselle and Mathilde, were fiercely loyal to each other, close enough that they were thought to possess some innate method of silent communication, until something pushed them apart.

- Lady Giselle Grey

The protagonist of the first volume, Giselle is an instinctive fighter, with an improvisational style.
Giselle is introspective, watchful - speaking only when necessary. She knows her own mind, the only sister to resist the brainwashing of her training, and is skeptical of the rituals and traditions that dictate her life. She nevertheless remains loyal to the Kaiser, grateful to him for sparing Mathilde's life as a child. During her escape following the Kaiser's death, Giselle's hair becomes stained red with blood, symbolizing her separation from her sisters and the beginning of a new life free from tradition.

- Lady Mathilde Grey

Giselle's twin sister, Mathilde is considered the ‘runt’ of the Greys. Her dark hair is unique among the sisters, and is enough for them to treat her with suspicion. As a result Mathilde embraces the family's rhetoric, desperate to feel a part of it. As a child Mathilde was highly creative, a quality incompatible with her role and as a consequence brutally suppressed. Like her sister an expert fighter, Mathilde however favors words over action, and would rather attempt to resolve conflict through negotiation.

- Lady Anna Grey

Anna is Strength - impulsive and violent. A zealot who unquestioningly accepts the Queen's rhetoric, Anna is the most dangerous of the Greys. In their role as the Kaiser's enforcers Anna believes it is the Greys who truly hold the power in Mitteleuropa.

- Lady Eva Grey

Stately, beautiful, Eva is Wisdom. The Matron Sister of the Greys, Eva is the wisest of the sisters, and so elegant a killer that the blood of her victims will not dare stain her clothes. Her greatest failing is her blind faith in the infallibility of His Majesty the Kasier.

- The Wolf General

In his role as Lord High Marshal of Mitteleuropa the Wolf General is responsible for the internal security of Mitteleuropa. Long ago he was a fervent advocate of the Kaiser, and of Gottfaust, but his experiences have led him to adopt a more pragmatic, long-term view. Now he serves only the people, believing them to be the true source of the nation's strength - more important than any king, politician or god. The General has a strange connection to Gottfaust's stone of power, and as a consequence possesses the uncanny ability to read the memories of the dead.

- His Imperial Majesty the Kaiser

Hind Von Medeim is ruler of Mitteleuropa, and the last in a line stretching back for almost a millennium. The people of Mitteleuropa consider him a living god, a single consciousness transferred from father to son, from vessel to vessel. Like Giselle the Kaiser feels constrained by duty, and this shared burden has created a deep, unspoken bond between them. A benevolent and just leader, the Kaiser married late, having dedicated his life to his people. His greatest failing is his devotion to Alena, a love that clouds his judgment, and blinds him to her malign influence.

- Alena von Medeim/Raisa Vasilyeva

Raisa Vasilyeva is the illegitimate daughter of Ursa's Czar. When her half-sister the Princess Alena was lost fleeing Ursa's revolution Raisa took her name and her title, rising through the ranks of society to eventually become the Kaiser's consort. Like the General Raisa too has been touched by the power of Gottfaust's stone – her hands scarred, cursed to corrupt with her anger anything she touches. With the help of her Governess Nana, Raisa conspires to avenge her Father and return home to claim Ursa's throne.

- Elliot Pepper

Former US airman Elliot Pepper is a fugitive and a conman, wanted by the Allies for desertion and by the Axis authorities for theft and fraud. A handsome, beguiling character, Pepper survives within Mitteleuropa itself by stealing and adopting the lives of others. Pepper likes to consider himself a free spirit, yet in practice he is nothing more than a war profiteer and a drunk. Yet it's his weakness for women and booze that presents him with the chance for redemption, in the voluptuous form of Miss Dina Cumming.

- Dina Cumming/Lady Fermoy

Formerly a Secret Agent for the Allies, Dina disappeared off the map after losing faith in the decisions of her superiors. As a rogue operative Dina is determined to create small pockets of instability within the Kaiser's territories. In order to gain access to confidential intelligence Dina seduced and married the Baron, a member of the Kaiser's inner circle. Enraged by his wife's deception the Baron brutally attacked Dina. But he had underestimated her, and in the fight that ensued the Baron was left horribly wounded.

- The Baron

The Baron is a member of the Cabal - a committee that advises the Kaiser, and represents the interests of the wealthiest families in his court. He has lived a privileged life, and always suffered from an inflated sense of worth. But his marriage to Dina and the injuries she inflicted have changed him, made him bitter, and cruel. He is driven by his desire for retribution, and willing to sacrifice the lives of his men in order to preserve his own.

- Gottfaust - Father of the Greys

Inspired by a stone that fell from the heavens a peasant boy became a great warrior. In time the stone became a symbol of his strength. The Kaiser named him Gottfaust, and he became the people's champion, ushering in Mitteleuropa's golden age. His strength and wisdom became legend, and the stories told about him give Gottfaust – and the stone – their power. For almost six hundred years Mitteleuropa was the dominant world power. Gottfaust sired three daughters. In time they too came to serve the Kaiser, as bodyguards and advisers. The last Kaiser of the Golden Age died, and was succeeded by his son. And then everything changed...

- Marshal & Marshall
- Marshal

The Marshal is a member of the Wolf General's entourage, a detective partnered with the boy Marshall to investigate strange anomalies in the fabric of reality known as ‘continuity errors’.

- Marshall

Partnered with the Marshal, Marshall is a young acolyte of the Wolf General, and a product of the anomalies they have been tasked with investigating. Marshall has the ability to step outside of the borders of the world and perceive the effect Gottfaust's stone has had on history. This talent places a great burden – both physical and emotional - on poor Marshall.

== Kickstarter campaigns ==
In March 2012 co-creator Hoang Nguyen announced a campaign on the crowd-funding website Kickstarter, raising money to finance a second volume of Carbon Grey. The campaign launched 15 March 2012, and received considerable media interest and support. The campaign successfully concluded on 14 April 2012, having surpassed its target amount of $40,000 to reach a final total of $45,215. The campaign was later praised in on-line press for its successful efforts to engage with fans.

A second Kickstarter campaign to fund a third and final volume was announced on Carbon Grey's official Facebook page on 20 February 2013. The campaign went live on 14 May 2013, exceeding its funding goal of $45,000 and reaching a total of $56,000 by its close on 13 June 2013.

The official soundtrack to Carbon Grey was released in 2013 as a Kickstarter promotion, produced by the artist CONTAINHER.

== Reception ==
Carbon Grey #1 was released on 2 March 2011. The book received generally favorable reviews, with the artwork in general (and Khari Evan's contribution in particular) singled out for praise. Ryan Lindsay at Comic Book Resources gave the book four out of five stars, describing Carbon Grey as "...a dark fairy tale with a cornucopia of delights and horrors", while Rich Johnson at Bleeding Cool called the book his new "guilty pleasure". However, Chris Murphy at Comics Alliance was concerned by what he perceived as Nazi iconography in the series, and the emphasis of "blood and bare flesh over story".

Later that month Image Comics released a press release announcing that issue one had sold out and would receive a second print run. The second edition, with an original cover, was released to coincide with the publication of the second issue.
