= Men in Black: The Roleplaying Game =

Tabletop role-playing game

Men in Black
- Cover art by Tim Bobko with photographs from Columbia Pictures
- Designers: Greg Farshtey; Peter Schweighofer; George R. Strayton; Nikola Vrtis
- Illustrators: Tim Bobko; Thomas ONeill; Brian Schomburg
- Publishers: West End Games
- Publication: 1997
- Genres: Science fiction

Men in Black: The Roleplaying Game is a licensed role-playing game published by West End Games (WEG) in 1997 that is based on the movie Men in Black.

== Description ==
Men in Black describes the rules to a role-playing game that uses the D6 System. The 144-page book is divided into ten sections:

1. "Who are the Men in Black?": The daily lives and work of the agents.
2. An introductory solo adventure
3. Character creation rules
4. Skills
5. Weapons and equipment
6. Combat rules
7. Advice to gamemasters
8. "Report on Known Aliens": Nine alien races seen in the film. Also rules for creating new aliens.
9. Alien technology
10. Scenario – "Revenge of the Geek": PCs investigate strange events in Pennsylvania high school

The book also includes five pregenerated characters and two blank character sheets.

== Publication history ==
Following the release of the film Men in Black in 1997, WEG acquired the role-playing game license. The result was the 144-page softcover book Men in Black: The Roleplaying Game, designed by Greg Farshtey, Peter Schweighofer, George R. Strayton and Nikola Vrtis, with artwork by Tim Bobko, Thomas ONeill and Brian Schomburg.

Shannon Appelcline in his book Designers & Dragons commented that "it was Men in Black (1997) that truly showed West End's new commitment to d6, as it was released exclusively using that system – marking an end to years of licensed MasterBook games."

WEG followed up with a number of supplements and adventures, including:

- The Director's Guide (1997)
- Aliens Recognition Guide (1997)
- Introductory Adventure Game (1998)

== Reception ==
The reviewer from Pyramid #28 (Nov./Dec., 1997) stated that "Using a dark sense of humor akin to that of their first RPG hit Paranoia, West End gives roleplayers all they need to become super-secret government agents charged with policing Earth's burgeoning (extra-terrestrial) alien population. Some 1,500 immigrants from the stars have immersed themselves in human society, using Earth as an apolitical middle ground, and the PCs constantly ride the ragged edge of disaster trying to keep the peace."

In Issue 5 of the French games magazine Backstab, Michaël Croitoriu commented, "Frankly, the game is very fun to read, even if the rules, practically copied verbatim from West End Games' other licensed products, Star Wars: The Roleplaying Game and Ghostbusters. Reading it is therefore a real pleasure. The question remains whether it's actually playable. Creating a character isn't a problem, nor is playing a first adventure. Designing and running a campaign (or at least several scenarios one after the other) is more debatable." Croitoriu concluded by giving the game a poor rating of 4 out of 10, saying, , "I don't think this game offers more than a good read and a fun game on an evening when the players are too distracted to play anything else."

In Issue 108 of the French games magazine Casus Belli, Patrice Mermoud noted, "The characters possess only symbolic psychological depth, perfectly represented by their names reduced to a simple initial. The more or less outlandish gadgets (including neuralyzers that erase the memories of inconvenient witnesses) are memorable, as are the alien races." Mermoud concluded, "Like its humorous predecessors, MIB probably isn't suited to a sustained campaign, but it does offer a welcome change of pace for a single game."

== Reviews ==
- Dragão Brasil #33
