= Kremlin (board game) =

Boardgame

- Cover
- Publication: 1986
- Genres: strategy

Kremlin is a board game satire of power struggles within the pre-glasnost Soviet Union government of the 1980s. The game takes its name from the Kremlin in Moscow, the location associated with the central Soviet government offices. The original German-language edition was designed by Urs Hostettler and released in 1986 by the Swiss board game company Fata Morgana Spiele under the name Kreml. An English translation of the game with slightly modified rules was published by Avalon Hill in 1988. Kremlin won a 1988 Origins Award for Best Boardgame Covering the Period 1900-1946.

== Gameplay ==
Each player controls a number of politician cards depicting caricatures of Soviet politicians. These are arranged in a pyramid on the game board, representing a hierarchy of power. Players promote, demote and exile these politicians in order to maneuver their own politicians to the top of the pyramid. Each turn, the Party Chief "waves" from the rostrum during a military parade in Red Square. If a player's politician waves during three non-consecutive years, that player wins. Additionally, politicians age and each year there is a chance they will die. If no player is able to wave three times, the player with the highest ranking politician at the end of the health phase of the 11th turn wins the game.

== Publication history ==
- 1986 1st edition (originally titled Kreml) by Fata Morgana Spiele (German language)
- 1988 2nd edition by Avalon Hill
- 1989 expansion by Avalon Hill, adding cards depicting the real people and events at the birth of the Soviet Union
- 2014 3rd edition by Jolly Roger Games, which included a new modern scenario
- 2014 Limited edition by Jolly Roger Games with alternate box art and promotional cards

== Reception ==
In the October 1988 edition of Games International (Issue 1), Brian Walker reviewed the Avalon Hill version as the magazine's "Game of the Month." Walker thought the production values of the components were "quite superb", and admired the game rules. He concluded by giving the game a perfect rating of 5 out of 5, saying, "It is difficult to determine the skill/luck ratio in this strange game, but who cares? The important thing is that it is such fun to play."

In the December 1993 edition of Dragon (Issue 200), Allen Varney reviewed Avalon Hill's 1988 edition and the 1989 expansion set favorably, saying, "Makes for backbiting, double-crossing fun, and Avalon Hill’s advanced rules work well."

Kremlin was chosen for inclusion in the 2007 book Hobby Games: The 100 Best. Lester Smith commented, "Kremlin invites us to look back on the Soviet era and put it in perspective through laughter. The humor in Kremlin is gallows humor, of course, as anyone who lived through the 1980s would attest. But the satire isn't constrained by its ties to the past, or to one political superpower; with the minimum of imagination, Kremlin can easily be seen as a pointed jab at any corrupt and treacherous bureaucracy populated by ambitious old men."

== Reviews ==
- Games #96

== Awards ==
At the 1989 Origins Awards, Kremlin won the award for Best Boardgame Covering the Period 1900-1946.
