= Star Wars Miniatures Battles =

1989 West End Games game

Star Wars Miniatures Battles is a tabletop wargame produced by West End Games in 1989.

== Publication history ==
The game was first produced by West End Games in 1989 and republished in a 2nd edition version in 1990. West End Games lost the license to produce any more "Star Wars" games in 1999, and the license was subsequently picked up by Wizards of the Coast the following year. Star Wars Miniatures Battles should not be confused with WOTC's Star Wars Miniatures.

Star Wars Miniatures Battles core rulebook was written by Stephen Crane and Paul Murphy, published by West End Games in January 1989. The rules included are for playing battles using the metal miniatures produced by West End Games. The stats included in the book can be easily converted to use with its Star Wars role-playing game

The Star Wars Miniatures Battles Companion, published in 1994, was the first supplement and added vehicle rules and flight rules to the game. It also included errata and rules revisions, as well as new and optional rules, new equipment, a section detailing unit insignia and organization, and a collection of game scenarios.

The Imperial Entanglements book, published in 1996, was primarily a scenario supplement, but also contained updated errata and new squad stats.

Both the core rulebook and companion were repackaged in two boxed sets along with some miniatures, The Star Wars Miniatures Battles Starter Set and Star Wars Vehicles Starter Set respectively. A third set, the Mos Eisley Adventure Set which was targeted primarily to the RPG aspect, included not only some miniatures and maps, but a small supplement with a Miniatures Battles scenario. Also, the short run series of the Star Wars Adventure Journal had a few articles pertaining to the miniatures rules.

== Reception ==
Chris Hind reviewed Star Wars Miniatures Battles in White Wolf #27 (June/July, 1991), rating it a 3 out of 5 and stated that "All in all, Miniatures Battles is a useful supplement for Star Wars miniatures collectors and GMs of Star Wars: The Roleplaying Game. However, to get full enjoyment out this product (and tabletop battles in general), a potential buyer should be prepared to invest extra money and time in collecting and painting miniatures."

Chris Hind reviewed Star Wars Miniatures Battles in White Wolf #46 (Aug., 1994), rating it a 3 out of 5 and stated that "As it stands, Miniatures Battles is useful for players who want to supplement roleplaying scenarios with the occasional battle. Those who are strictly wargamers have to invest in the upcoming vehicle rules and in plenty of miniatures."

It was winner of the 1991 Origins Award for Best New Miniatures Rules.

=== Reviews ===
- Challenge #58
- White Wolf #31 (May/June, 1992)
- Australian Realms #28

== Imperial Entanglements ==
Imperial Entanglements is a supplement published by West End Games in 1996. It is a collection containing nine adventure scenarios.

=== Reception ===
Andrew Rilstone reviewed Imperial Entanglements for Arcane magazine, rating it a 6 out of 10 overall. Rilstone comments that "There's [...] a tree-top battle between forces that survived the battle of Endor, in which you get to kill large numbers of Ewoks. It must surely be the high-point of this game."
