= Bug-Eyed Monsters =

Bug-Eyed Monsters is a 1983 board game published by West End Games.

== Gameplay ==
Bug-Eyed Monsters is a science fiction board game which takes place in 1951, involving alien invaders kidnapping women in one scenario, and presidential hopeful Dwight Eisenhower in the other scenario.

== Reception ==
Matt Costello reviewed Bug-Eyed Monsters in Space Gamer No. 68. Costello commented that "The overall quality of the rules, counters, and the attractive, helpful mapboard is first-rate. The scenarios play marvelously. Bug-Eyed Monsters even proves to be an excellent solitaire game."
