= DC Universe Roleplaying Game =

- DC Universe
- Designers: Fred Jandt and Nikola Vrtis
- Publishers: West End Games
- Publication: 1999
- Genres: Superhero
- Systems: Legend System (variant D6 System)

The DC Universe Roleplaying Game is a Legend System-based role-playing game set in the DC Comics universe and published by West End Games.

== History ==
The game system had several supplementary publications in print during the 1999–2002 timeframe, including:

- Sourcebooks, devoted to covering the key characters, organizations and technologies of the DC Universe setting. Published volumes were thematically organized (e.g. Superman-related characters in the Metropolis Sourcebook, Batman-related characters in the Gotham City Sourcebook, etc.).
- A series of Daily Planet Guides, sourcebooks designed to resemble travel guide to the fictional settings they detailed, written from the points-of-view of assorted characters known to either live in or regularly visit those backdrops. Published volumes in this line of sourcebooks covered Gotham City and Metropolis.
