= Fractal Spectrum =

Role-playing game magazine

Fractal Spectrum was a magazine about role-playing games that was published by Fractal Dimensions Publishing.

== Contents ==
Fractal Spectrum, edited by Donald Redick and Kathleen Seymour, included interviews of game designers, game reviews, industry news and variants of rules for various role-playing games.

== Reception ==
In the October 1997 edition of Dragon (#240), Rick Swan admitted the artwork was "so-so", and the articles were "too-specialized-for-their-own-good". But Swan thought, "What puts this periodical on the must-read list is the comprehensive news section. The latest issue (#13) offers close to 125 (!) reports covering every aspect of game-related publishing."

== Reviews ==
- Knights of the Dinner Table Magazine #18, p.83, "Zine Scene"
