= Star Wars: The Roleplaying Game =

Tabletop space opera role-playing game

Star Wars
The Roleplaying Game
- Cover based on the original movie poster by Tom Cantrell, 1977.
- Designers: Greg Costikyan
- Publishers: West End Games; Fantasy Flight Games
- Publication: 1987 1st edition; 1992 2nd edition; 1996 2nd edition Revised and Expanded; 2018 30th Anniversary edition
- Genres: Space opera
- Systems: D6 System
- The core system is based on that of WEG's Ghostbusters RPG.

Star Wars: The Roleplaying Game is a role-playing game set in the Star Wars universe, written and published by West End Games (WEG) between 1987 and 1999. The game system was slightly modified and rereleased in 2004 as D6 Space, which used a generic space opera setting. An unrelated Star Wars RPG was published by Wizards of the Coast from 2000 to 2010. From 2012 to 2020, the official Star Wars role-playing game is another unrelated game, the Star Wars Roleplaying Game, published by Fantasy Flight Games 2020). Since 2020, EDGE Studio have held the games's license.

== Development ==
The game, based on WEG's earlier Ghostbusters RPG, established much of the groundwork of what later became the Star Wars expanded universe, and its sourcebooks are still frequently cited by Star Wars fans as reference material. Lucasfilm considered the West End Games' Star Wars sourcebooks so authoritative that when Timothy Zahn was hired to write what became the Thrawn trilogy, he was sent a box of West End Games Star Wars books and directed to base his novel on the background material presented within. Many of the first uses of Star Wars alien names (such as the Twi'lek, Rodian, and Quarren) appeared for the first time in WEG's Star Wars books. Even after Disney's reboot of the Star Wars Expanded Universe in 2014, much of this nomenclature still exists in new canon works.

In 1992 West End Games published the second edition of the game, in which the title remained unchanged. In 1996 a revision of the second edition appeared, but its title was slightly changed from Star Wars: The Roleplaying Game - Second Edition to The Star Wars Roleplaying Game: Second Edition - Revised and Expanded.

By the end of the game's run around 140 sourcebook and adventure supplements had been published for the game during its run through three editions.

In addition fifteen issues of a magazine series, the Star Wars Adventure Journal, were published between 1994 and 1998. The Adventure Journal was published in novel format with around 280 pages, and consisted of adventures and articles for the game, plus short stories intended to provide inspiration for gamemasters and news relating to Star Wars.

WEG's license to produce Star Wars material was lost after the company declared bankruptcy in 1998, and the license was later acquired by Wizards of the Coast, who held it until 2010.

Fantasy Flight Games (a subsidiary of Asmodee), held the licence from 2012 to 2020. In 2018, they published the 30th Anniversary edition comprising the original core rulebook, and The Star Wars Sourcebook in a deluxe slipcase format. EDGE Studio (another subsidiary of Asmodee), has held the licence since 2020.

== Fantasy Flight Games reprint ==
In 2018, Fantasy Flight Games, the current holders of the Star Wars RPG licence, released a re-print of the original core book, in a deluxe slipcase format, along with the Sourcebook supplement.

== Game system ==
Star Wars: The Roleplaying Game uses the D6 System, originally developed for the Ghostbusters roleplaying game.

== Reception ==
Richard Thomas reviewed Star Wars: The Roleplaying Game in White Wolf #10 (1988), rating it a 10 out of 10 and stated that "you have a truly superior product. This is a game which is presented with style and humor as well as a great sense of fun and I heartily recommend it."

Chris Hind reviewed Star Wars: The Roleplaying Game (second edition) in White Wolf #34 (Jan./Feb., 1993), rating it a 5 out of 5 and stated that "in summary, Star Wars Second Edition is a great improvement over the original, and it's now one of the strongest SF roleplaying games on the market."

Andy Butcher reviewed Star Wars: The Roleplaying Game Second Edition Revised and Expanded for Arcane magazine, rating it a 9 out of 10 overall, and stated that "this Revised and Expanded edition of The Star Wars Roleplaying Game is the best version yet of a game that's always been great. Rather than a simple re-print of the second edition, it's clear that the designers at West End Games have made every effort to improve the game as much as they possibly can. It's perhaps best summed up by the first (and most important) piece of advice it gives to referees: 'Your goal is to make sure everyone has fun. If you and the players are having а good time, nothing else matters.' Fast-paced, easy to understand rules, a well-designed and written book, loads of helpful advice, and one of the most atmospheric and action-packed fictional settings ever devised. What more could you want?"

In a 1996 reader poll conducted by the UK magazine Arcane to determine the fifty most popular roleplaying games of all time, Star Wars: The Roleplaying Game was ranked 9th. The magazine's editor Paul Pettengale commented, "The rich and varied background already created by the movies helps a great deal, but there have been many games based on great fiction, and few of them work nearly as well as Star Wars: The Roleplaying Game. Everything about the system has been designed to complement the setting's unique blend of fantasy, science fiction and myth, and to recreate the same feel and atmosphere as the movies. [...] The rules system is beautiful in its simplicity, yet ably copes with everything from vicious space battles to speedy chases through narrow canyons. A clever set of guidelines covers the use of the Force, complete with details of both its Light and Dark sides, enabling characters to make heroic efforts and pull off the kind of stunts that are vital to what Star Wars is all about. [...] Perhaps the perfect system for introducing new players to roleplaying, and yet offering more than enough to keep even the most jaded gamers happy.

Pyramid magazine reviewed The Star Wars Roleplaying Game, Second Edition and stated that "Though I'm sure that the Emperor has foreseen it, and you probably did, too, a new edition of The Star Wars Roleplaying Game hit the stores recently and the Force is with it. Of course, it's not exactly a new edition. Rather it's the Second Edition, Revised and Expanded."

In his 2023 book Monsters, Aliens, and Holes in the Ground, RPG historian Stu Horvath noted, "Everything about the system is arranged around building momentum to a climactic finish, and it joins Toon in actively encouraging GMs to throw rules out if they endanger the flow of the action and the story."

== Awards ==
At the 1988 Origins Awards, Star Wars: The Roleplaying Game won in the category Best Roleplaying Rules of 1987.

== List of core rulebooks ==
Second edition (1992)

Second Edition, Revised and Expanded (1996)

First edition rules

- Star Wars: The Roleplaying Game (1987) ISBN 0-87431-065-2

Second edition rules

- Star Wars: The Roleplaying Game - Second Edition (1992) ISBN 0-87431-181-0
- The Star Wars Roleplaying Game: Second Edition - Revised and Expanded (1996) ISBN 0-87431-268-X

== List of supplements ==
- The Star Wars Sourcebook (1987)
- Campaign Pack (1988)
- Tatooine Manhunt (1988)
- Strike Force: Shantipole (1988)
- Battle for the Golden Sun (1988)
- Imperial Sourcebook (1988)
- The Star Wars Rules Companion (1989)
- Starfall (1989)
- Otherspace (1989)
- Otherspace II: Invasion (1989)
- Scavenger Hunt (1989)
- Riders of the Maelstrom (1989)
- Crisis on Cloud City (1989)
- Galaxy Guide 1: A New Hope - 1st Edition: 1989, 2nd Edition: 1995.
- Galaxy Guide 2: Yavin and Bespin - 1st Edition: 1989, 2nd Edition: 1995.
- Galaxy Guide 3: The Empire Strikes Back - 1st Edition: 1989, 2nd Edition: 1996.
- Galaxy Guide 4: Alien Races - 1st Edition: 1989, 2nd Edition: 1994, ISBN 0-87431-208-6
- Rebel Alliance Sourcebook (1990)
- Black Ice (1990)
- The Game Chambers of Questal (1990)
- The Isis Coordinates (1990)
- Death in the Undercity (1990)
- Galaxy Guide 5: The Return of the Jedi - 1st Edition: 1990, ISBN 0-87431-140-3, 2nd Edition: 1995, ISBN 087431-267-1
- Galaxy Guide 6: Tramp Freighters - 1st Edition: 1990, ISBN 087431-146-2, 2nd Edition: 1994, ISBN 087431-212-4
- Cracken's Rebel Field Guide (1991)
- Death Star Technical Companion (1991)
- Domain of Evil (1991)
- Graveyard of Alderaan (1991)
- Gamemaster Kit (1991)
- Planets of the Galaxy: Volume One (1991)
- Heir to the Empire Sourcebook (1992)
- Dark Force Rising Sourcebook (1992)
- Planets of the Galaxy Volume 2 (1992)
- Mission to Lianna (1992)
- Planet of the Mists (1992)
- The Abduction (1992)
- The Politics of Contraband (1992)
- Gamemaster's Screen (1992)
- Gamemaster Handbook (1993)
- Movie Trilogy Sourcebook (1993)
- Dark Empire Sourcebook (1993)
- Planets of the Galaxy Volume 3 (1993)
- Han Solo and the Corporate Sector Sourcebook (1993)
- Supernova (1993)
- Wanted by Cracken (1993)
- Twin Stars of Kira (1993)
- Galaxy Guide 7: Mos Eisley (1993)
- Galaxy Guide 8: Scouts (1993)
- Galaxy Guide 9: Fragments from the Rim (1993)
- Galaxy Guide 10: Bounty Hunters (1994)
- Galaxy Guide 11: Criminal Organizations (1994)
- The Last Command Sourcebook (1994)
- The Planets Collection (1994)
- Creatures of the Galaxy (1994)
- Cracken's Rebel Operatives (1994)
- Classic Campaigns (1994)
- Star Wars Adventure Journal 1–15 (1994–1997)
- Classic Adventures Vol 1 (1995)
- Classic Adventures Vol 2 (1995)
- Flashpoint! Brak Sector (1995)
- Galaxy Guide 12: Aliens - Enemies and Allies (1995)
- Galladium's Fantastic Technology: Guns and Gear (1995)
- Heroes and Rogues (1995)
- Platt's Starport Guide (1995)
- Goroth - Slave of the Empire (1995)
- Alliance Intelligence Report (1995)
- The Darkstryder Campaign (1995)
- The Thrawn Trilogy Sourcebook (1996)
- Shadows of the Empire Sourcebook (1996)
- Shadows of the Empire Planets Guide (1996)
- Star Wars Gamemaster Screen, Revised (1996)
- Tales of the Jedi Companion (1996)
- The Jedi Academy Sourcebook (1996)
- Truce At Bakura Sourcebook (1996)
- Classic Adventures Vol 3 (1996)
- The Best of Star Wars Adventure Journal Issues 1-4 (1996)
- Operation: Elrood (1996)
- Instant Adventures (1996)
- Darkstryder: The Kathol Outback (1996)
- Darkstryder: The Kathol Rift (1996)
- Darkstryder: Endgame (1996)
- Star Wars Trilogy Sourcebook - Special Edition (1997)
- Rules of Engagement: The Rebel SpecForce Handbook (1997)
- Cynabar's Fantastic Technology: Droids (1997)
- Secrets of the Sisar Run (1997)
- Cracken's Threat Dossier (1997)
- Platt's Smugglers Guide (1997)
- Pirates & Privateers (1997)
- Stock Ships (1997)
- The Player's Guide to Tapani (1997)
- Wretched Hives of Scum and Villainy (1997)
- The Black Sands of Socorro (1997)
- Lords of the Expanse (1997)
- Gundark's Fantastic Technology: Personal Gear (1997)
- Classic Adventures Vol 4 (1997)
- Mos Eisley Adventure Set (1997)
- No Disintegrations (1997)
- Star Wars Introductory Adventure Game (1997)
- Tapani Sector Instant Adventures (1997)
- Hideouts and Strongholds (1998)
- Alien Encounters (1998)
- The Far Orbit Project (1998)
- Classic Adventures Vol 5 (1998)

== Spinoffs ==
Star Warriors board game cover (1987, art by Ralph McQuarrie).

Four board games were published to coincide with the role-playing game, all of them by West End Games:

- Star Wars: Star Warriors (1987)
- Star Wars: Escape from the Death Star (1990, not to be confused with the 1977 game)
- Star Wars: Assault on Hoth (1988)
- Star Wars: Battle for Endor (1989, based on the battle from Return of the Jedi, not the similarly titled Ewok movie)

A miniature wargame was also written in 1989:

- Star Wars Miniatures Battles.

Five gamebooks were published by West End Games in the 1990s:

- Scoundrel's Luck (a Han Solo adventure) and Jedi's Honor (a Luke Skywalker adventure), both published in 1990, were the two only gamebooks of a series titled Solitaire Adventure, a type of Choose Your Own Adventure books.
- The Imperial Doublecross, published in 1997, was not part of the Solitaire Adventure series and used the Star Wars D6 rules and characters' die codes.
- The Lightsaber Dueling Pack and Starfighter Battle Book were picture gamebooks, presenting viewpoint series of pictures and the possible next courses of action, similar to Ace of Aces.

In the early 1990s, before the advent of the modern Internet, the FidoNet Star Wars Echo ran a message forum for playing the West End Games Star Wars Roleplaying Game on-line on computer bulletin board systems. The game also gathered a large Internet following via mailing lists such as the SW-RPG Mailing List.
