= Andrew Rilstone =

Role-playing game designer

- Occupation: Game designer

Andrew Rilstone is a game designer and blogger who has worked primarily on role-playing games.

== Career ==
Andrew Rilstone was the editor of the influential fanzine Aslan in the 1980s and early 1990s.

James Wallis, Rilstone and Richard Lambert created the story-telling card game Once Upon a Time in 1990. Once Upon a Time was finally published by Atlas Games in 1993, and was the first release from Atlas in the board and card game genre.

Wallis and Rilstone co-founded the RPG magazine Inter*action, the first issue of which was published in Summer 1994. Wallis founded Hogshead Publishing in October 1994; the company had three members of staff initially - Wallis, Rilstone, and Jane Mitton. Wallis and Rilstone changed the name of Inter*action to Interactive Fantasy due to issues with the trademark beginning with its second issue, which was the first publication from Hogshead. The Dying of the Light, a scenario pack for Warhammer Fantasy Roleplay published by Hogshead in 1995, included adventures by Wallis, Rilstone, Phil Masters, Chris Pramas, and other authors.
