= D6 System =

Tabletop role-playing game system

The D6 System
The Customizable Roleplaying Game
- Designers: Various authors
- Publishers: West End Games
- Publication: 1996
- Genres: Universal
- Systems: The D6 System

The D6 System is a role-playing game system published by West End Games (WEG) and licensees. While the system is primarily intended for pen-and-paper role-playing games, variations of the system have also been used in live action role-playing games and miniature battle games. The system is named after the six-sided die, which is used in every roll required by the system.

== System ==
=== Attributes and skills ===
Characters in the D6 System are defined by attributes and skills. Attributes represent the raw ability of a character in a certain area. Most D6 System games utilize anywhere from six to eight attributes, though these can vary greatly in number and name by the game in question. Acumen, Intellect, Knowledge, Perception, Presence and Technical are examples of mental attributes; Agility, Coordination, Mechanical, Physique, Reflexes and Strength are examples of physical ones. Skills are the trained abilities of the character and are associated with a specific attribute (e.g., driving, acrobatics, and climbing might be skills based on the Reflexes attribute). Each attribute and the skills under it are rated in values of Dice and Pips; Dice equal the number of dice rolled and Pips equal a one or two point bonus added to the roll to determine the result. The more dice and pips in the rating the better the character is at that skill or attribute. A character with a Strength rating of 4D+2 is stronger than a character with a Strength rating of 3D+1, for example.

=== Actions and resolution ===
Character actions are resolved by making dice rolls against a difficulty number. There are two types of difficulties, standard and opposed. To perform a standard difficulty action, the gamemaster calls for the player to roll the dice for a certain attribute or skill. The value of each die is totalled and the pips are added to the die roll to get a total. This total along with any GM or system imposed modifiers is compared against a target difficulty number. To perform an opposed roll action, the two parties involved (usually the player and a gamemaster controlled character) both roll their appropriate skills dice, total them and any modifiers and compare the results. If the first party's roll is higher than that of the second, he wins the contest and the rest of the result is resolved. If the second party equals or exceeds his opponent's roll, then the second party wins the contest.

==== Wild die ====
One of the dice rolled for each skill or attribute check or for damage is considered to be the "wild die", and is treated somewhat differently from the other dice. This mechanism was added in 2nd Edition. If an initial six is rolled on the wild die, then the die "explodes", meaning you add the six to the total plus re-roll the wild die, adding the result to the total. You get to keep rolling as long as you get sixes. If an initial one is rolled on the wild die, you disregard both it and the highest regular die from the total, often making you fail. Then you re-roll the wild die. If it comes up another one, a critical failure or complication occurs, usually with bad results for the character. Use of the wild die tends to make the game feel more cinematic.

==== Improving rolls ====
In order to increase their characters' effectiveness, players may spend character points and fate points. The exact number of character points that may be spent is limited by the quantity possessed by the character, and the situation that they are used in, with two being the typical limit. Each character point spent adds an extra wild die to one skill or attribute roll. A roll of one has no negative effect with wild dice generated from character points. Alternatively, a character may spend one fate point on an action. Characters have fewer fate points than character points, but the expenditure of them doubles the number of dice rolled on an action.

=== Variant resolution systems ===
Most D6 System games use the resolution system described above, which is sometimes called The D6 Classic System, though some variants exist. In one variant, The Legend System, instead of adding the die totals up, the dice showing 3, 4, 5 or 6 are each counted as a success. Use of a skill requires rolling a certain number of such successes. Pips are not used in the Legend System. This variation of the system was referred to, in jest, as "The D6 variant for the mathematically challenged" on WEG's own discussion forum. The Legend System has been utilized in the Hercules & Xena Roleplaying Game and the DC Universe Roleplaying Game. Other variants, such as those featured in the Star Wars Live Action Adventure Game and the Star Wars Miniatures Battles game, involve rolling a single six sided die and adding the result to a skill or attribute. This total is then compared to a difficulty number, as with the other variants.

== History ==
=== West End Games' early cinematic RPGs ===
A precursor to the D6 System first appeared in Ghostbusters: A Frightfully Cheerful Roleplaying Game, designed by Chaosium alumni Sandy Petersen, Lynn Willis and Greg Stafford, which was published by WEG in 1986. The following year, Greg Costikyan, Curtis Smith and Bill Slavicsek reworked elements from the Ghostbusters game into Star Wars: The Roleplaying Game. For a decade, West End Games published over 140 titles for the Star Wars Universe including a magazine, The Star Wars Adventure Journal.

=== D6 System standalone games ===
In 1996, WEG released The D6 System: The Customizable Roleplaying Game, written by George Strayton, which was the first core D6 System book not tied to a specific licensed or original property. Allowing total freedom to create any kind of roleplaying game through variation in attributes, skills, and every other game element all centered around the core mechanic of rolling six-sided dice against a difficulty number, the D6 System book shared as much in common with the role-playing game toolkit Fudge as it did with other universal systems like GURPS. WEG followed the D6 core book with Indiana Jones Adventures (a reworking of the earlier MasterBook setting) and the stand-alone Men in Black RPG. Another licensed game, the Hercules & Xena Roleplaying Game was the last title released by the original West End Games before their bankruptcy, as well as the first to use a modified D6 System based resolution engine that would later be known as the Legend System. A half-finished draft of a D6 System based Stargate SG-1 role playing game remained unpublished as a result of the bankruptcy.

=== Humanoids Publishing era ===
Following the bankruptcy, WEG was merged with French company Yeti, a subsidiary of Humanoids Publishing. Most of WEG's earlier licenses were terminated at this point, but the reconstituted company acquired another one from DC Comics. This license resulted in a new Legend System game, the DC Universe Roleplaying Game, which released a few titles from 1999 until 2001. As Humanoids Publishing was the publisher of the Metabarons graphic novels, they utilized the D6 System to release an RPG based upon that setting. Ron Fricke and former WEG publisher Scott Palter's Psibertroopers, the first licensed third party D6 System product, also saw release during this period. Humanoids began the process of releasing PDF format versions of many of the earlier WEG titles, converting some to the D6 System in the process. Humanoids released a PDF version of the Shatterzone Universe Guide containing an early version of D6 Space Opera. An initial PDF version of D6 Adventure was released as a rules lead in for the eventual re-release of Bloodshadows.

=== Purgatory Publishing era ===
In November 2003, shortly after the PDF release of D6 Adventure, the WEG assets changed hands once again. The new owner, Purgatory Publishing, re-released the game in the form of three hardcover rulebooks. The rulebooks, each written by Nikola Vrtis, were actually three separate games. Each shared the same core mechanics, but utilized different attributes, skill sets, equipment lists and power systems. D6 Adventure, an expanded hardcover release of the earlier PDF, covered wild west, pulp, espionage, low-powered super heroes, and other modern or near modern games. D6 Space shared much in common with the earlier Star Wars line, and detailed space opera and cyberpunk game rules. D6 Fantasy dealt with sword & sorcery, high fantasy and swashbuckling campaign models. Khepera Publishing's licensed D6 System super hero game Godsend Agenda was released shortly thereafter. In 2007, WEG announced Septimus, a new standalone D6 System game with a setting designed by Bill Coffin and a rules system paralleling that of Star Wars: The Roleplaying Game. Near the end of the year, WEG publisher Eric Gibson tentatively announced that the D6 System would soon be adopting a free license. At the end of the month of March, 2008, West End Games announced that the "Septimus" product would not be released due to cost issues. In August 2009, West End Games released most of the 51000 series of D6 book with attached OGL license officially classifying them and the D6 System as Open under the OGL v1.0. This re-release was in anticipation for a formal launch of the OpenD6 website portal and workstation, meant to aid publishers and players alike in creating, archiving, and searching the wealth of D6 rules and variants. Additionally, August 13, 2009, saw the long-awaited release of Bill Coffin's Septimus which itself was the first formal release of new material under the OpenD6 label.

=== Nocturnal Media era ===
In April 2016, The D6 System, together with West End Games, was bought by Nocturnal Media. The D6 books were made available on DriveThruRPG, and development for the system was mentioned. In 2017, The D6 System was licensed forward to Gallant Knight Games to publish a new edition for the system. GKG published a Zorro RPG that was based on the D6 System, which will continue to be finalized in D6 System: Second Edition.

In 2019, Nocturnal Media signed a development license with Lion Forge LLC to create new titles using the D6 system. The first title released under this license was Carbon Grey: The Roleplaying Game in 2022, based on the graphic novel series created by Hoang Nguyen. This title was published by Lion Forge subsidiary Magnetic Press under the new gaming imprint Magnetic Press Play. The game updated some of the core D6 rules and added a new set of rules as part of the "D6MV" (Magnetic Variant) System. Carbon Grey was nominated for an ENnie award for Best Production Value in 2022. Several other D6MV titles have been hinted at in 2023.

== Reviews ==
- Casus Belli #98

== See also ==
- List of D6 System books
- "Wiedźmin – Gra Wyobraźni" – a Polish role-playing game based on the Witcher books uses a system inspired by WEG's 'D6 system.
