= West End Games =

American tabletop role-playing game publisher

- Type: Private
- Industry: Role-playing, board, wargaming
- Founded: 1974
- Fate: Bankruptcy 1998. Partially merged 1999 and fully acquired in 2001 by Humanoids Inc. Acquired 2003 by Purgatory Publishing. Remnants acquired 2016 by Nocturnal Media.
- Successor: D6Legends, Inc. (a Humanoids Inc. unit, 1999–2003); Purgatory Publishing (2003–2016); Nocturnal Media (2016–present)
- Headquarters: New York City, New York, United States
- Key people: Daniel Scott Palter (founder)

West End Games (WEG) was a company that made board, role-playing, and war games. It was founded by Daniel Scott Palter in 1974 in New York City, but later moved to Honesdale, Pennsylvania. Its product lines included Star Wars, Paranoia, Torg, DC Universe, and Junta.

== History ==
Scott Palter received a JD from Stanford in 1972 and joined the New York State Bar before he began work at the family firm, Bucci Imports. Drawing on this financial connection, Palter was able to found West End Games, named after the bar in which the meeting that finalized its founding occurred: the West End Bar near Columbia University.

Initially a producer of board wargames, In 1983, Palter hired Ken Rolston, Eric Goldberg and Greg Costikyan as game designers, and WEG's focus turned away from traditional wargames. Costikyan's 1983 game Bug-Eyed Monsters brought WEG into the science-fiction and fantasy genres. Then Costikyan and Goldberg brought Palter a manuscript for a role-playing game that originally had been conceived by their friend Dan Gelber. Palter agreed to buy the rights to the game, and after some editing and polishing by Rolston, it was released at Gencon in 1984 as WEG's first role-playing game, Paranoia. In 1985, Paranoia won WEG an Origins Award for "Best Roleplaying Rules of 1984".

The high production values demanded by the wargames industry made them one of the few companies who could compete with TSR, and they were able to acquire the license from Columbia Pictures to produce an RPG based on the film Ghostbusters. This game, Ghostbusters: A Frightfully Cheerful Roleplaying Game, formed the basis of the D6 System which was to be heavily used in many of their licensed products.

In 1987, the company released their Star Wars role-playing game. Since the films had been released some years previously, and there was (at the time) no new media forthcoming, the success of these books came as a surprise. The game established much of the groundwork of what later became the Star Wars expanded universe. Lucasfilm considered their sourcebooks so authoritative that when Timothy Zahn was hired to write what became the Thrawn trilogy, he was sent a box of West End Games Star Wars books and directed to utilize the background material presented within. Zahn's trilogy, in turn, renewed interest in the franchise and provided further sales for West End Games, which released sourcebooks for Zahn's three novels from 1992 to 1994.

1990 saw the release of the Torg roleplaying game, followed in 1994 by the Masterbook system, which was mostly used in licensed RPG adaptations: Indiana Jones, Necroscope, Species, Tales from the Crypt, Tank Girl, and The World of Aden. Another licensed game, the Hercules & Xena Roleplaying Game, was the last title released by the initial version of the company: in July 1998, West End Games went into bankruptcy, following mismanagement between West End Games and its then-parent company, shoe importer Bucci Retail Group. When the parent company filed for bankruptcy, West End Games was forced to go under as well, despite an attempt by Palter to perform a Chapter 11 reorganization of the company's finances. As a result, former WEG designers Costikyan and Goldberg took Palter to court over ownership of Paranoia, and in 2000, the courts ruled that the license should revert to Costikyan and Goldberg.

=== D6 Legends ===
The bankrupt West End Games became WEG / Creative Design Group while a new West End Games (D6 Legends, Inc.) was formed in partnership with Yeti, a French design house and publisher and subsidiary of Humanoids Publishing, in March 1999. Under court supervision, WEG/Creative Design Group sold off product and assets to pay off debt. WEG/Creative Design Group sold to the new company intellectual property, the Paranoia licensing contracts, and the trademarks. Licensing contracts for Indiana Jones, Star Wars and Xena remained with Creative Design Group, though the Star Wars license was soon lost to Wizards of the Coast, who released their own Star Wars game in 2000.

At the 1999 GAMA Trade Show, the new West End Games announced a third edition of Paranoia for late June or early July of that year, followed by a Bug Sector supplement, but these were never released. The DC Universe license was acquired and a new RPG was also announced at that time, which was published in 1999.

As Humanoids Publishing was the publisher of the Metabarons graphic novels, they utilized the D6 System to release an RPG based upon that setting. The project was a commercial failure, and Humanoids Publications decided to exit from the role-playing game market and sell off West End Games at the end of 2002.

On July 1, 2002, the company made its systems—D6 Classic, D6 Legend, MasterBook, and Torg—available via license to any publisher.

=== Purgatory Publishing ===
In November 2003 West End Games was bought by Eric J. Gibson's Purgatory Publishing. He moved the company to Downingtown, Pennsylvania, in 2004. Under his tenure, Torg received a revised edition and a generic version of the D6 System was produced, which led to a line of irregularly produced supplements and met with general approval from fans. However, this did not translate into high sales; in a post on the official West End forums in 2008 Gibson announced that none of the D6 products produced since he acquired West End had turned a profit, and West End's other RPG lines were not performing as well as he had expected, leading to losses of hundreds of thousands of dollars.

West End also expanded back into board games, beginning with a new edition of Junta, which according to Gibson was one of the few products that did turn a profit.

In 2007, the company announced a new science-fiction RPG by Bill Coffin called Septimus, offering preorders, but following delays it was publicly cancelled by Gibson in March 2008. Gibson stated in July 2008 that West End Games could not afford to provide refunds to customers who preordered the cancelled Septimus product, and indeed could not even afford to pay the postage to ship books to individuals who were willing to accept a refund in the form of products instead of money. Following the Septimus cancellation and fan backlash, Gibson said that he was planning on selling all of WEG's properties, although this did not occur at that time. WEG eventually released Septimus via PDF and print on demand.

Gibson stated in a 2010 podcast interview that he was "perhaps foolishly optimistic" in assuming sales would be higher than they turned out to be because "the name West End Games would carry a lot of weight". He further stated that this led him to print more books than he could sell, books which he eventually had to destroy in order to save on storage costs. Gibson planned to release the d6 System under the terms of the Open Gaming License (OGL) to increase sales but also "to protect it from myself", meaning that if the company had to be sold or go out of business, the system would still be available to the general public. In 2009, West End Games moved forward with these plans, with the resulting license known as OpenD6.

Following the Septimus project, Purgatory Publishing sold off most of their properties. In June 2010, Torg was sold to German game company Ulisses Spiele, while in July 2010 the Masterbook system, Shatterzone, and Bloodshadows were sold to Precis Intermedia. West End Games itself and its remaining properties—which by then consisted primarily of the D6 System—was purchased in April 2016 by Nocturnal Media, White Wolf Publishing founder Stewart Wieck's gaming company.

=== Nocturnal Media ===
Nocturnal intended to keep the West End Games brand alive, and their first project using this branding was a revised edition of Greg Costikyan's 1984 WEG boardgame, Web and Starship. A Kickstarter was launched in April 2016 and was successfully funded, but the death of Nocturnal owner Stewart Wieck in June 2017 ultimately resulted in the cancellation of that project. A licensing deal to publish a Second Edition of the D6 System was made with Gallant Knight Games in October 2017.

Company founder Scott Palter fell ill and died on February 17, 2020.

== Associated designers ==
Game designers previously affiliated with West End Games over its long history include:

- Joe Balkoski
- Jeff Briggs
- Greg Costikyan
- Dan Gelber
- Eric Goldberg
- Greg Gorden
- Paul Murphy
- Ken Rolston
- Bill Slavicsek
- Bill Smith
- Jon Southard
- Steve Gilbert

== Systems developed ==
- D6 System – Used in games like Star Wars, Ghostbusters, and Men in Black.
- Masterbook – The Masterbook system grew out of the system used in the game Torg. It was further developed and became the basis for games such as Necroscope and Tales from the Crypt. Sold to Precis Intermedia.
- Torg – Sold to Ulisses Spiele.

== Role-playing games ==
- Paranoia (1984 original designed by Greg Costikyan, Dan Gelber, and Eric Goldberg; 3rd Edition 1999)
- Ghostbusters (1986)
- Price of Freedom (1986)
- Star Wars: The Roleplaying Game (1987)
- Ghostbusters International (1989, second edition of Ghostbusters: A Frightfully Cheerful Roleplaying Game)
- Torg (1990)
- Shatterzone (1993, sold to Precis Intermedia)
- The World of Indiana Jones (1994)
- The World of Necroscope (1995)
- The World of Tank Girl (1995)
- The D6 System: The Customizable Roleplaying Game (1996)
- Indiana Jones Adventures (1996, conversion of The World of Indiana Jones to the D6 System)
- The World of Tales from the Crypt
- Shatterzone (1997, sold to Precis Intermedia)
- Men in Black (1997)
- Hercules & Xena (1998)
- Stargate SG-1 role-playing game (1999, aborted due to bankruptcy)
- DC Universe (1999, published under Humanoids Inc.)
- Metabarons (2001, published under Humanoids Inc.)
- Septimus (2007, published via print-on-demand)

== Board games ==
- Bug-Eyed Monsters (1983)
- Junta (1985, third edition. The first edition was released in 1978, but not by West End Games) (1997)
- Web and Starship (1984)
- Tales of the Arabian Nights (1985)
- Star Trek: The Adventure Game (1985)
- Kings and Things (1986)
- Star Wars: Star Warriors (1987)
- Star Wars: Assault on Hoth (1988)
- Star Wars: Battle for Endor (1989)
- Star Wars: Escape from the Death Star (1990, not to be confused with the 1977 game by Kenner)

== Wargames ==
Historical boardgames.

- Against the Reich (1986)
- Air and Armor (1986)
- Air Cav (1985)
- The Battle of Shiloh (1984)
- Chickamauga (1986)
- Desert Steel (1989)
- Druid (1984)
- Eastern Front Tank Leader (1986)
- Fire Team (1987)
- Imperium Romanum II (1985)
- Kamakura (1982)
- Killer Angels (1984)
- The Last Panzer Victory (1983)
- Marlborough at Blenheim (1979)
- Operation Badr (1983)
- RAF (1986)
- Salerno: Operation Avalanche (1977)
- Soldiers: Man-to-Man Combat in World War II (1987)
- South Mountain: Prelude to Antietam (1984)
- St. Lo (1986)
- Western Front Tank Leader (1987)

== Other games ==
- Social Disorder (2005) card game
- Star Wars Miniatures Battles (1989) miniatures game
- Zoon (1999) card game
