= Indiana Jones and the Rising Sun =

Role-playing game supplement

Indiana Jones and the Rising Sun is a supplement published by West End Games (WEG) in 1994 for the action-adventure role-playing game The World of Indiana Jones, itself based on the Indiana Jones movie franchise.

== Description ==
Indiana Jones and the Rising Sun provides information about using Japan in the 1930s as a setting. Content includes an overview of Japan at that time, the military, society and culture, martial arts, and equipment that would be found in Japan at that time. There is also a chapter titled "Unearthly Nippon" that outlines various Japanese supernatural phenomena and creatures. New role-playing material includes several new player character types such as local guide, spy, and street kid.

The book includes a complete adventure, "Indiana Jones and the Masamune Blade": The player characters must trace the whereabouts of an archaeology professor, who has gone missing during an expedition to Japan to search for a rare artifact. A pair of cardstock gamemaster's screens come with the book.

== Publication history ==
After WEG developed a standard role-playing game system in 1994 called Masterbook, they used it for licensed role-playing games based on Necroscope, Species, Tales from the Crypt, Tank Girl, World of Aden, and Indiana Jones. (TSR had actually held the license for Indiana Jones in 1984, but their product The Adventures of Indiana Jones Role-Playing Game was not a big hit and TSR allowed the license to expire in 1994.) When WEG gained the license, they immediately published The World of Indiana Jones in 1994.

The game's first supplement, Indiana Jones and the Rising Sun, was published the same year, a 96-page book designed by Bill Olmesdahl and David Pulver, and developed and edited by Greg Farshtey, with interior art by Paul Daly, Jaime Lombardo and Ron Hill, and cover design by Tim Bobko.

== Reception ==
In the March 1995 edition of Dragon (#215), Rick Swan thought the book offered "a good mix" of material, and called the included adventure "compelling" and "creepy". Although Swan found the martial arts chapter "lackluster", he especially liked the "Unearthly Nippon" chapter about supernatural Japan. He concluded by giving the book an average rating of 4 out of 6, saying, "Indiana Jones and the Rising Sun is a must for aficionados of supernatural pulp."

== Other reviews ==
- Rollespilsmagasinet Fønix, Issue 7 (March/April 1995, p. 56, in Danish)
