= D6 Adventure =

- D6 Adventure Rulebook
- Designers: Nikola Vrtis
- Publishers: Purgatory Publishing, Inc. d.b.a. West End Games
- Publication: 2004
- Genres: Action adventure, pulp, espionage, western
- Systems: The D6 System

D6 Adventure is a generic role-playing game system based on the D6 System. D6 Adventure is published as a stand-alone rulebook (not dependent upon or requiring any other D6 System rulebooks) and is supported by its own line of supplements.

== Setting ==
Being a generic system, D6 Adventure contains no setting information, and provides rules material for playing in a wide variety of modern or near-modern cinematic settings, including action adventure, pulp, espionage, western, and low-powered superhero games. West End Games has released one world book for D6 Adventures, a reworking of the Masterbook title Bloodshadows.

== System ==
D6 Adventure uses the D6 Classic System for resolution, and is compatible with most games that use that system. As with all D6 System games, there are differences from other related games. D6 Adventure uses the attributes of Reflexes, Coordination, Physique, Knowledge, Perception and Presence. Two optional attributes, Psionics and Magic, are also possible.

Psionics is a presented as a new rigidly defined power system. Although in part derived from the special effects system from Masterbook, this skill based system is unique to D6 Adventure. A magic system is also presented, which is identical to the one found in D6 Fantasy.

Modern and pulp-era equipment is presented in D6 Adventure, and firearms are covered in more specific detail than in D6 Space. Statistics for generic modern non-player characters are also provided.

== History ==
Eric J. Gibson reworked the D6 System into a more generic rules system, as the third iteration of West End Games published a series of three core hardcover books, D6 Adventure (2004), D6 Fantasy (2004) and D6 Space (2004), and supplements to these genre books focusing on creatures and locations were published in 2004 and 2005.

D6 Adventure was originally released in 2003 as a PDF format ebook of the same name by Humanoids Publishing. It was sold as a core rulebook for their line of PDF re-releases. This was greatly expanded and revised by author Nikola Vrtis into the current D6 Adventure Rulebook (ISBN 1-932867-00-7), released in 2004 by Purgatory Publishing imprint West End Games. At present, D6 Adventure is supported by three source books.

- Bloodshadows redesigned by Nikola Vrtis, based on the works of various authors (ISBN 1-932867-06-6)
- D6 Adventure Locations by various authors (ISBN 1-932867-05-8)
- D6 Adventure Creatures by various authors (ISBN 1-932867-10-4)

Bloodshadows is a setting that crosses film noir with fantasy and horror elements, and is set on the alternate world of Marl. The Locations book describes an assortment of fictional unusual locations designed as a travel guide. The Creatures supplement details an assortment of monsters and encounters for modern and near-modern settings.

D6 Powers, an additional supplement by licensee Khepera Publishing, is also available. This book revises the advantages, disadvantages and special abilities from D6 Adventure, as well as super powers derived from the DC Universe Roleplaying Game, into a sourcebook for running superhero or other high power games with the D6 System rules.

== Reviews ==
- Pyramid

== See also ==
- D6 Fantasy
- D6 Space
