= Shatterzone =

Tabletop space opera role-playing game from 1993

The Roleplaying Game
- 1st edition box set cover (1993)
- Designers: Ed Stark
- Publishers: West End Games (1993-1997), Precis Intermedia (2011-Present)
- Publication: 1993 (1st Edition) West End Games; 2011 (Classic Reprint Edition) Precis Intermedia
- Genres: Science fiction, Cyberpunk
- Systems: MasterDeck System
- The core system is a variant of WEG's TORG RPG.

Shatterzone is a 1993 space opera role-playing game by West End Games. The game went out of print in 1997 after the company went bankrupt. It came back in 2011, published by Precis Intermedia.

The universe of Shatterzone shares some structural similarities to the Star Wars expanded universe including an intergalactic government called the Consortium (like the Republic from Star Wars) run from a central region of space known as the Core Worlds, large megacorps that run galactic affairs (a theme common in the cyberpunk genre of storytelling), and a super-industrialized capital world, called Centaurus, but similar to Star Wars' Coruscant. Likewise, there is a sentiment of xenophobia in the setting similar to that of the Empire in Star Wars. Humans, Glahns, and Ishantras, the three ruling races of the Consortium and a few others are given full citizen status while other races suffer under prejudice and second-class-citizenship. In an interview with the creator of Shatterzone, Scott Palter, he refuted the connection stating that his intention was for a "darker setting, more to my tastes than Star Wars" citing inspiration instead from C. J. Cherryh’s Company Wars.

The namesake feature of the setting is the "Shatterzone", an uncharted and mysterious sector of space consisting of dark matter and strange gravitational phenomena as well as strange energy storms and asteroid fields. The Shatterzone is home to cult worshippers, bands of alien exiles called "bolters" seeking to flee Armagon oppression, and groups of deep space miners looking to make a fortune off the rare minerals to be had in this unusual sector of space.

== Alien races ==
In Shatterzone there are three classes of race: Citizens, which only Humans, Glahns, and Ishantras have the right to become; Allied, which consist of races who have signed nonaggression pacts with the Consortium, but which have no rights to representation; and Hostile/Unidentified, which are considered suspicious and are treated with caution.

- Glahns - one of the three ruling races in the galaxy, blue skinned humanoids organized into clans
- Ishantras - another ruling race, immensely varied due to cross-species gene-engineering, who lost their homeworld in an ancient cataclysm
- Armagons - an incredibly powerful alien empire of various races which rule from beyond the Shatterzone, pillaging and destroying one world after another
- Yithras - a disagreeable race whose thin, wood-like bodies emanate chill rather than warmth
- Kestarians - golden-skinned, four-armed matriarchical humanoids who use their allure to influence others
- Rednas - reptilian humanoids with traditions of violence, whose pre-spacefaring civilization is prized for its metalwork.
- Veronians - shapeshifters from an unidentified homeworld nearly eradicated by other races out of paranoia
- Reavers - aggressive humanoids allied with the Armagons as shock troops

== Planets and regions ==
- Xenos Sector - a little-explored region near the Shatterzone
- Planet Haven - torn apart in a civil war, now a staging ground for pirates and mercenaries
- Planet Bartonrealm - corporate owned world, home of BartonCorp
- Planet Ral Sikkim - desert frontier world claimed by an alliance of pirate organizations
- Planet Centaurus - superpopulated capital world, Core World and center of civilization
- Planet Delera - home to a race of technophobes
- Planet Mandamus - mining planet that produces terraforming compounds
- Planet Vantage Point - old corporate world overthrown by colonists
- Planet Aureus - arid world populated by mystics who disbelieve in space travel

== Timeline ==
The current era is the 25th Century.

The development of coldsleep technology and mastery of nuclear fusion engines enable easy travel within the Solar System, and the possibility of extrasolar colonization. The overwhelming desire to escape the restrictions of life on Earth drive some to establish illegal "black" colonies without the consent of the government. The Secessionist Wars ensue and the first intergalactic fleets of warships are created.

2276: Humans discover a derelict alien space vessel, and while the science of how its quantum drive (or Q-Drive) functions is beyond the grasp of human science, it is a relatively simple mechanism which researchers are soon able to recreate and mass-produce. Using the new alien technology, human ships become capable of reaching speeds 365 times the speed of light. Abundant faster-than-light engines allow a phenomenon called the Diaspora, in which the world population drops from 25 billion to 500 million over the next two centuries as extrasolar colony worlds become genuine home worlds to large populations of humans.

2320: First contact with the Glahn.

2486: The establishment of the Consortium of Worlds, a joint government of the homeworlds of the Humans, Glahn, and Ishantra.

== Rules ==
The system uses a pair of d10 dice rather than a d6 or d20.

Most rolls are made with two d10 (noted as 2d10). The results are added together, with "0" being equivalent to "10" and two "0"s being equal to "20". A natural "10" result is a Critical Success (called an "Explosion" in the rules). Like the "Wild Die" in Savage Worlds, the player can roll an additional time per Critical until they get a result lower than "10". Then the player adds the numbers together as the roll's result. (Note: Example: A roll of "2" and "0" would be a total of "12", with one die "exploding". The player then re-rolls the Exploding Die and gets a "7", which adds "7" to the base result (12 + 7) for a total of "19".)

It also uses a deck of 108 cards called the MasterDeck that was later used in the generic MasterBook system. Similar to WEG's earlier TORG Drama Deck and later influencing the Savage Worlds Action Deck, it came in three types of effects. The 83 black Enhancement cards are handed in by the player for random benefits, like a bonus on a character's task roll, temporarily allowing extra actions, or granting extra Life Points. The 17 red Subplot cards are used immediately by the Game Master to create a random event or encounter. The four Picture cards (Disaster, Opportunity, Wild, and Interloper) are Wild Cards that can provide special effects that the gamemaster can tailor to their needs. The remaining 4 were two blank cards and 2 blank Picture cards. Expansions to the MasterDeck come with 12 blank cards and 24 Plot Development Cards, which are Subplot cards that the players control that potentially could grant extra Skill Points.

=== Characters ===
Like WEG's earlier Star Wars: The Roleplaying Game and TORG, the player chooses from archetypal templates (like "Megacorp Freelancer" or "Old Scout") rather than create a custom character. The player can also create an altered or new template, but like most template games (like FASA's Shadowrun or White Wolf's World of Darkness), it is very hard to alter or build them with the rules as they are. The advantage to template characters is speed of play. Players who are unfamiliar with Shatterzone or want to play a pickup game can jump into play without struggling with generating a character first. Meanwhile, more experienced players can easily replace a deceased character in an ongoing adventure or campaign.

If the player wants to build a template using a point-based system, they get the same 65 Attribute Points and 20 Skill points (which roughly converts to 28 Life Points (Note: To clarify, Life Points are experience points that can be spent to increase Attributes or Skills. They are not the character's Health or Hit Points, which are based on the character's Toughness score.)) as the basic templates. For those who want to take their chances, they can roll 2d10 on a table and get a random number of beginning Attribute and Skill points.

==== Attributes ====
The eight Shatterzone character Attributes (Note: In comparison to other West End Games rpgs, Ghostbusters uses four Traits: Brains, Muscle, Moves, and Cool. Star Wars TRPG uses six Attributes: Dexterity, Perception, Knowledge, Strength, Mechanical, and Technical. The generic D6 System uses seven Attributes: Agility, Strength, Knowledge, Perception, Mechanical, and Technical - with the optional Metaphysical attribute covering paranormal abilities like magical and psychic powers.) are like the six Ability Scores used in Dungeons & Dragons. (Note: The six Dungeons & Dragons Ability Scores are Dexterity, Strength, Constitution, Intelligence, Wisdom, and Charisma. Advanced Dungeons & Dragons temporarily added a seventh: Comeliness (the character's physical attractiveness).) Some are divided into two similar Attributes (perhaps to balance the Skill List). Attribute values range from 5 to 13. The average value of an attribute is about 7 or 8, a value of 13 is considered exceptional (the ceiling for unenhanced characters), and a value of 14 or higher is considered supernormal.

The four Physical Attributes are Agility, Dexterity, Strength, and Endurance. Agility and Dexterity are like D&D's Dexterity, except Agility controls reflexes and fine motor control tasks and Dexterity is used for coordination and gross motor control tasks (much like they are in Pinnacle Entertainment's Classic Deadlands). Endurance (like D&D's Constitution) helps the character resist pain and shock. Strength (like D&D's Strength) helps determine how much you can lift and carry or how much damage you can do in unarmed or armed melee combat.

The four Mental Attributes are Intellect, Mind, Charisma, and Confidence. Intellect (taking the place of D&D's Intelligence) is about problem-solving and comprehension while Mind (taking the place of D&D's Wisdom) is about using what you learned through experience. Charisma and Confidence are like D&D's Charisma; both have similarly themed skills except they have different methods. Charisma is based on personality and human engineering (getting others to believe you and manipulating or convincing them into doing what you want). Confidence is based on cunning and willpower (believing in yourself and making people do what you want).

Toughness, the character's innate resistance to damage, is Shatterzone's equivalent to Hit Points. It is a derived attribute calculated from adding double the character's Endurance level to their Strength level and dividing the result by three. (Note: Formula: [((END*2)+STR) ÷ 3]. Example: Endurance 7 and Strength 8 = [((7*2)+8)÷3] = [(14+8)÷3] = [22 ÷ 3] = 7.33 (rounded down to 7) = Toughness 7.)

Backgrounds are crunchy bits of character flavor. "Advantages" (which are self-explanatory) give the character an edge of some kind. "Compensations" (the term for disadvantages in Shatterzone) hold back the character in some way. They usually balance out (a -1 for every +1) and are geared towards the character template and its concept. For example, the "Old Scout" template, an experienced and salty Fleet veteran, has Increased Skill Adds: +4 [4], which adds +4 Skill points for the cost of 4 Attribute points. This is paired with and opposed by Skill Limitation: Charm [-4], which blocks the character from putting points in the Charm skill or any of its Specializations, but frees up 4 Attribute Points.

==== Skills ====
There are two classes of skills (Untrained & Trained) and three types of skills (Skills, Macro skills and Specializations).

Untrained skills are ones that the average person is at least familiar with, and can be used at a default. They cost 1 Skill Point for the first level and cost a multiple of the next level in skill points. Perception, (Note: Perception concerns the senses (sight, hearing, smell/taste, and touch) and general situational awareness.) an Untrained skill, would cost 1 Skill point at first level, 2 at second level, and 3 at third level for a total cost of 5 skill points.

Trained skills require that the person has to study or practice for a long time to familiarize themselves. They have to be bought for the character to use them. They cost 10 Skill Points for the first level and cost double the number of the next level. Science, a Trained skill, would cost 10 points at first level, 4 points at 2nd level, and 6 points at third level for a total cost of 20 skill points.

Macro skills and Specializations are like lenses.
Macro skills are wide focus. They are a skill group (like Language (Note: The Language Macro Skill is more like Linguistics and its Facets would be individual languages (like French or Klingon). It is also used to intuit what a being whose language you don't know is trying to convey through reading their tone, body language and gestures.) or Navigation (Note: Navigation would cover navigation in general, while its Facets could be Orienteering, Cartography, or operating and programming a starship's navigation computer.)) with related sub-skills (called "Facets") attached to them. This makes it easier for a character to do things with a catchall skill (like Beast Riding or Vehicle Piloting) without paying for an expensive collection of individual skills the character may rarely use. For example, a person with Beast Riding would know how to tame and break a wild animal to allow it to be ridden, to ride the animal and attempt stunt riding tricks, use melee or ranged weapons while mounted, (Note: A Beast Riding roll would grant a bonus to an attack for a success and a penalty to an attack for a failure.) and calm or control it if it became spooked or aggressive.

Specializations are narrow focus. They could be a sub-set of a skill's focus like a mechanic who specializes in just repairing internal-combustion-engine vehicles or a character with Heavy Energy Weapons who specializes in using Plasma Flamers. Or they could be a "facet" (sub-skill) of a Macro skill, like a person with Science skill taking a Specialization in Biology, Marine Biology or Cetology. Because they have restrictions, they cost half as much as regular skills during character template design but are the same price afterwards during play.

A beginning character's skill levels range from a minimum of "0" (no experience or training in the skill) to a maximum of "3" (advanced training). This cap prevents a character from being too specialized to be playable. The rating of a skill is equal to the corresponding Attribute level plus the skill's level; this combined result is the skill rating number. For example, a character with an Untrained or Trained skill at level 0 based on an Agility of 9 would have a rating of "9" (and would be considered a default Skill of 9). A character with an Untrained or Trained skill at level 3 based on an Agility of 9 would have a rating of "12" (and it would be written down under Agility as Skill: 12). Players can buy skill levels higher than "3" after their characters earn experience through gameplay.

Studying with a tutor or master for training during play reduces Skill Point cost by half. This can also happen if another character in the party has the Scholar: Teaching macro skill facet and a higher level in the desired skill.

=== Skill rolls ===
The player has to add a sum of the character's Attribute level plus Skill Adds and Specialization Adds bonuses and subtract the Difficulty Modifier (DM) number. The harder the task, the higher the DM number. A DM 3 is a very easy task, a DM 9 is an average task, and a DM 22 would be an almost impossible task. Trying to perform a task or action that requires a rating in a Trained skill that the character does not have does so at an additional DM +8 (more if it requires a Facet or Specialty). Then 2d10 are rolled and the results checked on a modifier table, (Note: Modifier Table examples: a result of 2 is a "-10" penalty, 9 or 10 is a "0" (or neutral) result, and 20 is a "+9" bonus. There are bonuses up to "+14" for a die roll result of 41 through 45. Higher results are figured by adding an additional "+1" bonus per every extra 5 points on the dice roll (like a "+15" bonus for a result of 50).) with the result being added or subtracted from the base sum. The larger the success margin, the greater the result; this is converted into Result Points, which are read on another table to determine the result.

Another modifier is drawn from the Value System, which is similar to the Mayfair Exponential Game System found in Mayfair's DC Heroes and Underground. A Value number is assigned to a geometrically-increasing amount of time, distance, or mass (for instance, a Value of 15 is equal to 1000 units, which could be seconds, meters, or kilograms). The big trip-up is that minutes and hours are figured in blocks of 60 rather than 100, days are figured in blocks of 24 hours (and are more or less hours than that on other planets), and so on. The conversion rules to figure out time values in Shatterzone are complex and still don't work. (Note: Rick Swan in his review in Dragon Magazine #203 (p.84) offered a simple homebrew rule. Time in Shatterzone is divided into 10-second "rounds" of play. That would make 6 rounds per minute and 360 rounds per hour. Round up to the nearest Value number for the Value System number modifier.)

There are also modifiers derived from the General Push Table, which is when you want to drive faster, keep moving while fatigued or wounded, or exert more effort in lifting a heavy object. The character gets an increase in Result Points at the cost of a penalty (like a damaged engine, a septic wound, or thrown-out back-muscles respectively).

=== Life Points and Skill Points ===
Life Points are experience points and can be spent to increase Attributes or buy Advantages. You begin play with 5 Life Points and earn more after completing adventures. Skill Points are spent to improve skills. They are created by converting them from Life Points; 1 Life Point converts to 3 Skill Points.

You can spend a point to affect a die-roll, like Fate Points in FATE Core or Fate Chips in Classic Deadlands. They have different results depending on what type of point you use.

- You can spend a Life Point before you make a die roll to grant a +1d10 bonus to the result. Each roll of a natural "10" on this bonus die allows the player to roll again and add to the result. A Life Point can also be spent to cancel out up to 3 levels of damage or shift a die roll result on one of the dozens of charts.
- You can spend a Skill Point to re-roll after you make a bad roll.

== Reception ==
Chris Hind reviewed a prepublication copy of Shatterzone in White Wolf #36 (1993), rating it a 2 out of 5 and stated that "Shatterzone offers nothing new. West End has simply combined and recycled its other games. Pretty pictures in the final version might bump the rating to a '3,' simply because of production quality."

In the March 1994 edition of Dragon (Issue 203), Rick Swan was not impressed with the overly-complex rules system of this game, saying, "reading the rulebook is about as much fun as staring into a light bulb." He did like the setting, commenting that it "combines high-tech grit with fairy-tale whimsy to create a role- playing arena of remarkable invention." But he found the rest of the rules "a minefield of charts and numbers." He concluded by giving the rules system a poor rating of 2 out of 6, although he gave the setting of the game 4 out of 6.

== Reviews ==
- Challenge #76 (1995)
- Casus Belli #78

== See also ==
- Shatterzone RPG
  - Crosshairs - planetary atlas supplement for the planet Texaiter, a polluted mining planet. They export raw materials and natural resources and import industrial waste.
  - The River of God - novel released before the game
  - Beyond the 'Zone - novel released in 1993
  - Brain Burn - adventure released in 1993
  - Zeenarchs - supplement released in 1993
  - Arsenal - supplement released in 1993
  - Fringers Guide - supplement released in 1993
  - Grimsyn Sector - supplement released in 1993
  - Techbook: Ships - supplement released in 1994
- Star Wars: The Roleplaying Game (West End Games)
- TORG
- Masterbook Each box set came with a copy of the MasterBook rules, a worldbook, a MasterBook deck, and a pair of 10-sided dice.
  - Bloodshadows (1994)
  - The World of Indiana Jones (1994)
  - The World of Necroscope (1995)
  - The World of Species (1995)
  - The World of Tank Girl (1995)
  - The World of Aden (1996)
  - The World of Tales from the Crypt (1996)
- Alliance–Union literary universe by C. J. Cherryh
  - Company Wars series
