= Indiana Jones and the Tomb of the Templars =

- Cover
- Designers: Ken Cliffe, Greg Farshtey, Teeuwynn Woodruff
- Publishers: West End Games
- Publication: 1995
- Genres: Period adventure/alternate history
- Systems: Custom

Indiana Jones and the Tomb of the Templars is a collection of adventures published by West End Games in 1995 for the action-adventure role-playing game The World of Indiana Jones, itself based on the popular Indiana Jones media franchise.

== Description ==
Indiana Jones and the Tomb of the Templars is a collection of three adventures, all set in Great Britain in the mid to late 1930s.

1. "Tomb of the Templars": The lost treasure of the Knight Templars is hidden somewhere in Scotland, and involves Rosslyn Chapel, travel through tunnels supposedly used by Robert the Bruce and a confrontation with a demon called Baphomet.
2. "The Druid's Curse": The players follow Druidic ley lines and battle Nazis.
3. "Sword in the Stone": The players search for King Arthur's sword Excalibur.

Each adventure includes non-player characters, maps, background material and suggestions for further adventures.

== Publication history ==
TSR acquired the first license in 1984 for a role-playing game based on Indiana Jones and produced The Adventures of Indiana Jones Role-Playing Game, but the game did not sell well and after ten years, TSR allowed the license to expire. West End Games immediately acquired the rights to publish their own Indiana Jones role-playing game, The World of Indiana Jones using their Masterbook game system. Their first set of scenarios for the game, published in 1995, was Indiana Jones and the Tomb of the Templars, written by Ken Cliffe, Greg Farshtey, and Teeuwynn Woodruff, with artwork by Tim Bobko, Paul Daly, Ron Hill, Jaime Lombardo, Tom O'Neill and Brian Schomburg.

== Reception ==
In Issue 26 of Australian Realms, Lee Sheppard thought that the supernatural element was so strong that "With a bit of tweaking, some of these adventures could also make excellent Call of Cthulhu sessions, and fans of that game might also want to have a look at this release." However, Sheppard was not pleased with the "sloppy editing", citing numerous typographical errors. Sheppard also pointed out a number of modern American cultural references slipping into the British 1930s setting, commenting, "All in all, it smacks of a too hasty release schedule." Sheppard concluded, "This is the world of pulp adventure, with stereotypical villains, last second escapes from certain death and pure unadulterated excitement - a task the Masterbook game system handles well. Good fun."

== Other reviews and commentary ==
- Rollespilsmagasinet Fønix, Issue 9 (August/September 1995, p.56, in Danish)
