= D6 Fantasy =

Tabletop role-playing game

- D6 Fantasy Rulebook
- Designers: Nikola Vrtis
- Publishers: West End Games
- Publication: 2004
- Genres: Fantasy
- Systems: The D6 System

D6 Fantasy is a generic fantasy role-playing game (RPG) based on the D6 System. D6 Fantasy is published as a stand-alone rulebook (not dependent upon or requiring any other D6 System rulebook) and is supported by its own line of supplements.

== Setting ==
Being a generic game, D6 Fantasy contains no setting information, instead providing rules material for playing in a wide variety of cinematic high fantasy, sword and sorcery and swashbuckling settings. A setting supplement Otherwheres was completed but is awaiting cover art. Another setting Sundered World is in the planning phases.

== System ==
D6 Fantasy is a D6 Classic System game, and shares many of the rules from other games using that system. The attribute set is defined as Agility, Coordination, Physique, Intellect, Acumen and Charisma. Two optional extranormal attributes, Magic and Miracles are also possible.

A new power system for Miracles is presented, which builds upon the Magic system also contained within. These are both derived from the Special Effects system from MasterBook (which, in turn, was based on the magic system from Torg). Miracles are a power set exclusive to D6 Fantasy; Magic as presented in the rulebook is identical to the system in D6 Adventure.

The skill list is smaller than most other D6 System games and the ability to read and write is treated as a skill, rather than an assumed ability. In addition, rules and equipment listings for sea going vessels are included, as is a basic monster construction system.

== History ==
Eric J. Gibson reworked the D6 System into a more generic rules system, as the third iteration of West End Games published a series of three core hardcover books, D6 Adventure (2004), D6 Fantasy (2004) and D6 Space (2004), and supplements to these genre books focusing on creatures and locations were published in 2004 and 2005.

The D6 Fantasy Rulebook was released in 2004 by the Purgatory Publishing imprint of West End Games, and designed by Nikola Vrtis. D6 Fantasy is the first D6 System roleplaying game to cover the fantasy genre (the earlier Hercules & Xena Roleplaying Game used the Legend System variant). At present, D6 Fantasy is supported by two source books: D6 Fantasy Creatures and D6 Fantasy Locations. The former (released in 2004) presents more than eighty creatures for use in fantasy games, most adapted from myth, legend or the Torg RPG. The latter (released in 2005) details castles and settlements, and provides systems for generating dungeons.

== See also ==
- D6 Adventure
- D6 Space
