= D6 Space =

Role-playing games supplement

- D6 Space Rulebook
- Designers: Nikola Vrtis
- Publishers: West End Games
- Publication: 2004
- Genres: Science fiction
- Systems: The D6 System

D6 Space is a generic science fiction role-playing game (RPG) based on the D6 System. Although derived, in part, from material originally presented in The Star Wars Roleplaying Game, D6 Space is published as a stand-alone rulebook (not dependent upon or requiring other D6 System or Star Wars rulebooks) and is supported by its own line of supplements.

== Setting ==
Being a generic system, the D6 Space Rulebook contains no setting information, and provides rules material for playing in a wide variety of cinematic space opera and cyberpunk settings. One setting, Fires of Amatsumara is currently available from West End Games. Another, Dead Night of Space, by licensee Final Sword Productions is compatible with these rules.

== System ==
D6 Space uses the D6 Classic System ruleset, and is thus compatible with other games using those rules. Some differences do exist between D6 Space and other related games. D6 Space uses Agility, Mechanical, Strength, Knowledge, Perception and Technical as its attributes. Apart from Agility replacing Dexterity, this is the same attribute set previously used by The Star Wars Roleplaying Game. A seventh optional attribute, Metaphysics, is also possible.

The Metaphysics attribute is used by a new free-form power system. This is based on the Special Effects system from Masterbook (which was derived from the magic system from Torg). This replaces the system for using The Force from The Star Wars RPG, and the Psionics system used in the earlier D6 Space Opera PDF.

Scaling (a method of determining how combat is handled between combatants and objects of starkly different sizes) uses a numeric modifier in D6 Space, and does not conform to the ship class names used in The Star Wars RPG. This new scaling system is also present in D6 Fantasy and D6 Adventure, though the benchmark names for the values listed differ between the three games.

A disadvantages, advantages and special abilities system not present in The Star Wars RPG, is included, as is a system for using special abilities as Cybernetic implants.

A basic star ship construction system is presented (which is expanded upon in the Space Ships supplement). This system differs from the systems presented throughout The Star Wars RPG line.

== History ==
Eric J. Gibson reworked the D6 System into a more generic rules system, as the third iteration of West End Games published a series of three core hardcover books, D6 Adventure (2004), D6 Fantasy (2004) and D6 Space (2004), and supplements to these genre books focusing on creatures and locations were published in 2004 and 2005.

D6 Space was originally released in 2003 as a PDF format ebook under the name D6 Space Opera by Humanoids Publishing. It was sold as a core rulebook for their line of Shatterzone PDF re-releases. This was greatly expanded and revised by author Nikola Vrtis into the current D6 Space Rulebook (ISBN 978-1-932867-01-5), released in 2004 by Purgatory Publishing imprint West End Games.

When the cover art was first announced for D6 Space, there was some negative reaction to the original version of the art. The original had the female principal nude (although genitalia and nipples were not visible), in a cyberpunk motif. In response to the reaction, West End Games revised the cover to its current form.

At present, D6 Space is supported by three source books.

- D6 Space Ships by various authors (ISBN 978-1-932867-07-7)
- D6 Space Aliens Volume 1 by various authors (ISBN 978-1-932867-11-4)
- Fires of Amatsumara concept by Fred Jandt, by various authors (ISBN 978-1-932867-16-9)

The Ships supplement contains expanded rules for star ship creation, and new rules for planet generation. The Aliens supplement demonstrates species templates for a variety of alien races and creatures, and methods for creating more. Fires of Amatsumara is a setting book, mixing elements of space opera and frontier westerns, comparable to Firefly.

== See also ==
- D6 Adventure
- D6 Fantasy
