= Crosshair (disambiguation) =

A crosshairs, also called a crosshair, is a type of reticle. Other meanings include:

== Media ==
- "Crosshair", a song by the Danish band Blue Foundation
- Cross Hair (G.I. Joe), fictional G.I. Joe character
- Crosshairs (Transformers), several robot superhero characters in the Transformers robot superhero franchise
- Crosshair (Star Wars), a deformed clone trooper and former member of The Bad Batch in the Star Wars franchise
- "Crosshairs" (The Punisher), an episode of The Punisher

== Other uses ==
- Crosshairs, a feature of some screen magnifiers
- ASUS Crosshair, a line of computer motherboards for AMD processors
- Crosshairs (Shatterzone), a 1993 supplement for the role-playing game Shatterzone

== See also ==
- Corsair (disambiguation)
