= Indiana Jones and the Temple of Doom Adventure Pack =

Role-playing game supplement

Indiana Jones and the Temple of Doom Adventure Pack is an adventure published by TSR in 1984 for the action-adventure role-playing game The Adventures of Indiana Jones Role-Playing Game, itself based on the Indiana Jones movie franchise.

== Description ==
This role-playing adventure recreates the events of the movie Indiana Jones and the Temple of Doom. Players are expected to use pre-generated characters that are based on the characters from the movie.

== Publication history ==
In 1984, TSR gained the license to make a role-playing game based on Indiana Jones, and released The Adventures of Indiana Jones Role-Playing Game the same year. Over the next two years, TSR supported the game with six adventures, the first being IJ1 Indiana Jones and the Temple of Doom Adventure Pack, a 32-page softcover book with a large map and outer folder written by Tracy Hickman and Michael Dobson. Photographs from the movie were taken by Keith Hampshire and Ralph Nelson, and cartography was by David S. "Diesel" LaForce

The Indiana Jones role-playing game did not sell well, and TSR eventually ceased publication and allowed the license to expire. In 1994, West End Games acquired the rights to publish their own version of a role-playing game, The World of Indiana Jones.

== Reception ==
In Issue 22 of Imagine, Paul Mason reviewed the first two adventures in the series, Indiana Jones and the Temple of Doom Adventure Pack and Raiders of the Lost Ark Adventure Pack, and felt the adventures should have branched out away from the movie storylines, saying, "My major gripe is that they both stick too closely to the films apart from the odd occasion here and there, the modules attempt to steer the characters into replaying the exact events of the films. Given that anyone playing In these scenarios has almost certainly seen the films, I'd anticipate the game being somewhat spoiled by such rigid adherence to the films' plots."

Russell Grant Collins reviewed Indiana Jones and the Temple of Doom Adventure Pack and Raiders of the Lost Ark Adventure Pack for Different Worlds magazine and stated that "Temple of Doom suffers from the fact that Indy has to make the correct choices to even get into the main adventure; if he leaves town by car instead of plane or heads directly to Delhi instead of the village, he can miss the whole thing. This module tells the gamemaster to force the players in the correct direction, if necessary using dozens of thuggee thugs. On the other hand, Indy might not live to reach the adventure, because he has to get the antidote and survive the plane crash and river ride and the various dangers of the journey and the assassin before reaching the temple in question. Each of these requires a number of attribute rolls to achieve (and there are more to come). If he continually fails his rolls, well, bye-bye Indy! The worst of the system is highlighted in this concatenation of attribute rolls disguised as an adventure. The designer should have realized that it's no fun for anyone if Indy and company are killed in the crash on their way to the Temple of Doom and simply said that any even half-way plausible scheme to survive would succeed well enough to enable our heroes to arrive at the village intact."
