= Raiders of the Lost Ark Adventure Pack =

Tabletop role-playing game adventure

Raiders of the Lost Ark Adventure Pack is a tabletop role-playing game adventure published by TSR in 1984 for the action-adventure role-playing game The Adventures of Indiana Jones Role-Playing Game, itself based on the Indiana Jones movie franchise.

== Description ==
This role-playing adventure recreates the events of the movie Raiders of the Lost Ark. Players are expected to use pre-generated characters that are based on the characters from the movie.

== Publication history ==
In 1984, TSR gained the license to make a role-playing game based on Indiana Jones, and released The Adventures of Indiana Jones Role-Playing Game the same year. Over the next two years, TSR supported the game with six adventures, the first being IJ1 Indiana Jones and the Temple of Doom Adventure Pack, followed by IJ2 Raiders of the Lost Ark Adventure Pack the same year. Raiders is a 32-page softcover book with a large map and outer folder written by Douglas Niles. Art was by Jeff Easley, and cartography was by David S. "Diesel" LaForce.

The Indiana Jones role-playing game did not sell well, and TSR eventually ceased publication and allowed the license to expire. In 1994, West End Games acquired the rights to publish their own version of a role-playing game, The World of Indiana Jones.

== Reception ==
In Issue 22 of Imagine, Paul Mason reviewed the first two adventures in the series, Indiana Jones and the Temple of Doom Adventure Pack and Raiders of the Lost Ark Adventure Pack, and felt the adventures should have branched out away from the movie storylines, saying, "My major gripe is that they both stick too closely to the films apart from the odd occasion here and there, the modules attempt to steer the characters into replaying the exact events of the films. Given that anyone playing In these scenarios has almost certainly seen the films, I'd anticipate the game being somewhat spoiled by such rigid adherence to the films' plots."

Russell Grant Collins reviewed Indiana Jones and the Temple of Doom Adventure Pack and Raiders of the Lost Ark Adventure Pack for Different Worlds magazine and stated that "Of the two modules, Raiders is definitely the better one. The gamemaster is given the situation and told how to handle most common deviations from the movie (once Indy is recruited, his actions invariably lead him to Nepal and thence to Cairo; what happens after that varies a bit but the only difficulty I see is what happens if Indy is killed, a drawback to every adventure in this game)."
