= Dragonship (disambiguation) =

Dragonship or dragon ship may refer to:

- Dragonship, a Viking ship prowed with a dragonhead, see Longship
- Dragonships of Vindras, a fantasy-adventure novel series by American writers Margaret Weis and Tracy Hickman
- Dragon boat, a traditional Chinese watercraft now used exclusively in racing
- SpaceX Dragon 2, the SpaceX Dragon 2 Crew Dragon variant, sometimes called Dragonship
- Crew Dragon Endeavour, the first operational Crew Dragon reusable spacecraft, sometimes called Dragonship Endeavour
