= Indiana Jones Judge's Survival Pack =

Tabletop role-playing game supplement

Cover art by Clyde Caldwell, 1985

Indiana Jones Judge's Survival Pack is a supplement published by TSR in 1985 for the action-adventure role-playing game The Adventures of Indiana Jones Role-Playing Game, itself based on the Indiana Jones movie franchise.

== Contents ==
Indiana Jones Judge's Survival Pack is a 16-page booklet with a cardstock cover and cardstock inserts that includes:

- a Combat Computer to help players with calculations
- cardstock models that can be cut apart and assembled, including a truck, a motorcycle and side car, and a jeep
- cardstock cut-out furniture, floors, idols, railway crossing signs, and traffic barriers
- expanded character generation rules
- maps of generic ruins
- advice for gamemasters
- the cardstock bifold cover acts as a gamemaster's screen

== Publication history ==
In 1984, TSR gained the license to make a role-playing game based on Indiana Jones, and the result was The Adventures of Indiana Jones Role-Playing Game. A number of adventures and supplements were subsequently published, including 1985's Indiana Jones Judge's Survival Pack, a 16-page booklet with a cardstock cover and cardstock models sheet designed by Harold Johnson, with contributions by Ed Carmien. The cut-out figures and interior art were created by Dennis and Marsha Kauth, cartography was by Dave Sutherland, and cover art was by Clyde Caldwell.

The Adventures of Indiana Jones Role-Playing Game did not sell well, and TSR eventually allowed the license to expire, and publication stopped.

In 1994, West End Games acquired the rights to publish their own Indiana Jones role-playing game, The World of Indiana Jones.

== Reception ==
In Issue 29 of Imagine, Paul Mason was not impressed by the Indiana Jones Judge's Survival Pack, saying "this accessory pack doesn't provide anything that makes it particularly worth the price and much of what it does contain should have been included in the original game anyway. But if you're a mad keen Indiana Jones player, you'll probably find it indispensable."

== Other recognition ==
A copy of Indiana Jones Judge's Survival Pack is held in the collection of the Strong National Museum of Play (object 110.2082).
