= The Fourth Nail =

The Fourth Nail is a 1985 role-playing game adventure published by TSR for The Adventures of Indiana Jones Role-Playing Game.

== Plot summary ==
The Fourth Nail is an adventure in which Indiana Jones sets out in search of one of the fabled nails used in the crucifixion of Christ. His journey spans continents, beginning in Australia and culminating in Barcelona. The scenario accommodates both solo play and group sessions.

== Publication history ==
IJ6 The Fourth Nail was written by Tracy Raye Hickman with a cover by Clyde Caldwell and published by TSR in 1985 as a 16-page book, a 4-page pamphlet, map, viewer film, cardstock miniatures, and two outer folders.
