= Crystal Death =

Role-playing game adventure

- Designers: Tracy Hickman
- Illustrators: Jeff Easley
- Publishers: TSR
- Publication: 1984
- Genres: Action adventure

Crystal Death is a collection of chronologically-linked short adventures published by TSR in 1984 for the action adventure role-playing game The Adventures of Indiana Jones Role-Playing Game, itself based on the Indiana Jones franchise.

== Plot summary ==
Crystal Death is a collection of linked short adventures that starts in France and ends in the dense jungles of Africa, and features Indiana Jones against Nazi antagonists. It features a unique "Magic Viewer" tool—a physical gameplay element designed for one player and the gamemaster—which conceals parts of the map and narrative until revealed using a colored film.

== Publication history ==
In 1984, TSR gained the license to make a role-playing game based on Indiana Jones, and the result was The Adventures of Indiana Jones Role-Playing Game. TSR also published a number of adventures for the game, one of them being IJ3 Crystal Death, written by Tracy Hickman with art by Jeff Easley and published by TSR in 1984 as a 16-page book plus map, "evidence sheet", viewer film, and an outer folder.

The Indiana Jones game was savaged by critics and did not sell well, and TSR eventually allowed the license to expire, and publication stopped.

== Reception ==
In Issue 32 of Abyss, Dave Nalle called this "a collection of mini-scenarios produced with some flash and some tacky gimmicks." Nalle called the scenarios "childish and unimaginative, and between the style and the gimmicks I'd say this was aimed at an audience of 10 year olds with little imagination or interest in role-playing." Nalle concluded "If I were publishing products aimed at this sort of audience, I'd seriously reassess my personal value system"
