= Nepal Nightmare Adventure Pack =

Nepal Nightmare Adventure Pack is a 1985 role-playing game adventure published by TSR for The Adventures of Indiana Jones Role-Playing Game.

== Plot summary ==
Nepal Nightmare Adventure Pack is an adventure in which Indiana Jones and Marion Ravenwood embark on a globe-spanning quest to find her missing father, journeying from the ancient, myth-shrouded labyrinth of Crete to the icy peaks of the Himalayas.

== Publication history ==
IJ5 Nepal Nightmare Adventure Pack was written by Marlene Weigel with a cover by Clyde Caldwell and published by TSR in 1985 as a 16-page book, large map, cardstock miniatures, and two outer folders.
