= Harold Johnson (game designer) =

American game designer and editor

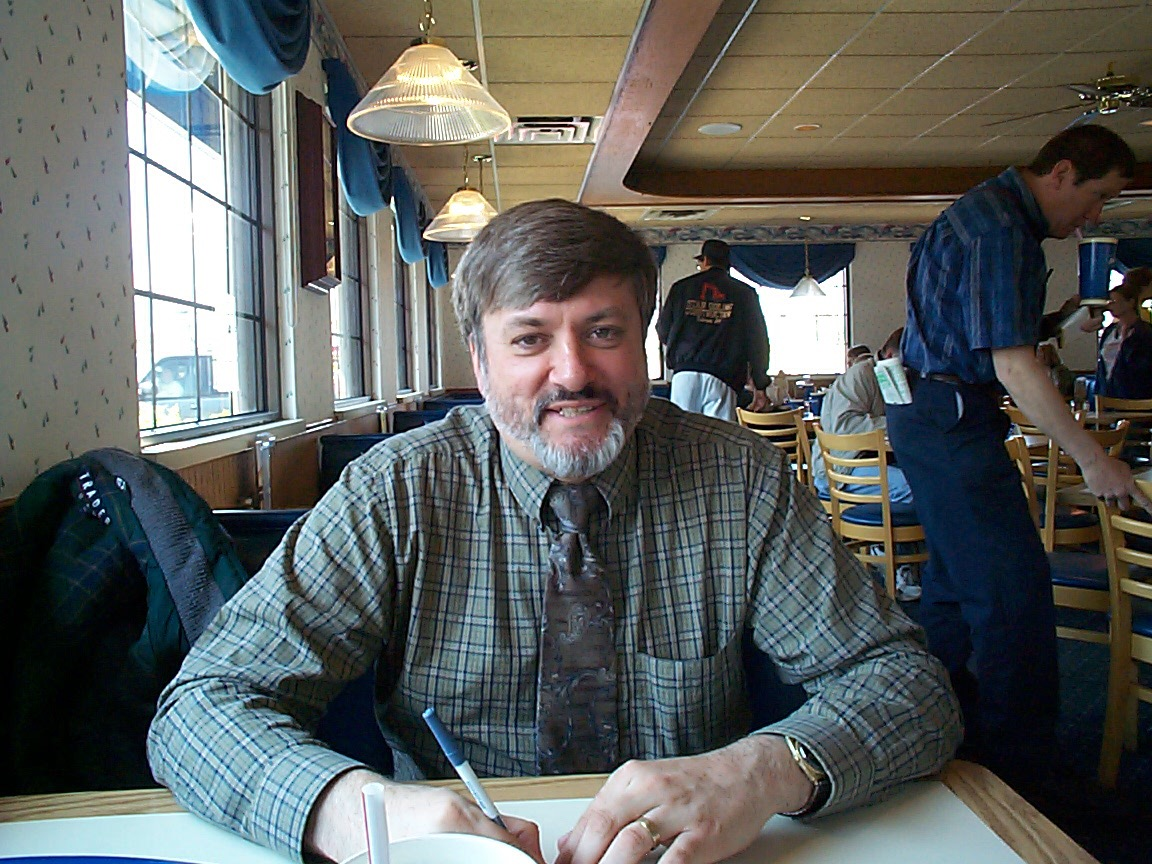
- Harold Johnson in Lake Geneva, Wisconsin (2000).
- Born: Evanston, Illinois
- Occupation(s): Game designer, editor, author
- Spouse: V.J. (1982–present)
- Children: Allison

Harold Johnson is an American game designer and editor, and author of several products and articles for the Dungeons & Dragons fantasy role-playing game from TSR.

== Early life and education ==
Harold Johnson was born in Evanston, Illinois. Johnson attended Northwestern University and got his B.S. in Biology in 1977. Johnson played his first game of Dungeons & Dragons in 1976; he soon became an avid player, and attended his first Gen Con convention in Lake Geneva in 1977. "I was very surprised to find that TSR was located so close to Chicago." After graduating from college, Johnson continued to work odd jobs, and play games.

== Career ==
In the fall of 1978, Johnson responded to an ad in Dragon magazine for a job as a games editor at the magazine's publisher, TSR. He was not selected for the job after the interview, but applied for another job with TSR as a game designer, but instead TSR hired him as an editor. His first assignment was as a copy editor on the original Dungeon Masters Guide, to which he also contributed some rules. He also began working on a tournament module which would later become C1, Hidden Shrine of Tamoachan. "That was to prove to the company I could write."

Johnson was promoted to Manager of Production less than seven months after being hired by TSR. He had responsibility for editing, layout, and dealing with the printers—from design turnover to manufacturing turnover. In the following years, Johnson worked as Assistant to the Vice President for Research & Development, Manager of Game Design, and Manager of Editing. In 1982, Johnson was promoted to Director of Games Research & Development. The same year, Johnson married his wife V.J., and in 1984 they had their first child, Allison.

Johnson supervised all of the staff game designers for TSR, and also managed the company's Acquisition Department. Johnson was responsible for hiring many new game designers during his tenure with TSR, including Frank Mentzer, Jon Pickens, and Tracy Hickman. His co-creation of the concept for the Dragonlance line is among his credited roles in many projects. Johnson was the first to join in Hickman's "Project Overlord" and became the biggest proponent of the project to the upper management of TSR; he also convinced Hickman to expand Dragonlance beyond his initial concept of a being just a trilogy of adventures.

Harold Johnson designed the modules The Hidden Shrine of Tamoachan (1980), and Secret of the Slavers Stockade (1981), and also wrote the IJAC1 Judge's Survival Pack, and IJ4 The Golden Goddess for the Indiana Jones role-playing game. He was part of the design team for several early Dragonlance modules and products. He also worked on other product lines, such as Forgotten Realms, Spelljammer, and Ravenloft, and worked as an editor and project coordinator on numerous D&D products throughout the 1980s and 1990s, and provided some design contributions early in the game's third edition.
