= Starshield =

Starshield may refer to:

- Starshield (fiction), a proposed trilogy of science fiction novels
- SpaceX Starshield, a SpaceX satellite model for incorporating military or civil-government payloads
- King Starshield (Walston Shield) – singer of Saint Kitts and Nevis
