= The World of Aden =

Role-playing games supplement

The World of Aden is a 1995 role-playing game supplement published by West End Games for MasterBook.

== Contents ==
The World of Aden is a setting intended for Masterbook and D6 System, and uses background featured in two SSI video games, Thunderscape and Entomorph. Shane Lacy Hensley wrote the world book, which was later converted into a tabletop roleplaying game by West End Games. When SSI sold off its assets, The World of Aden was not included. Shane Hensley received an official transfer of the intellectual property from the former president of SSI, and eventually sold it to Kyoudai Games, who publishes the current version of the tabletop RPG (as of February 2022).

== Publication history ==
Shannon Appelcline commented that "The World of Bloodshadows (1994), a noir fantasy, was West End's only original setting for MasterBook; everything else was licensed. The World of Indiana Jones (1994) and The World of Necroscope (1995) might have been good licenses. However, the same can't be said of The World of Aden (1996), The World of Species (1995), The World of Tales from the Crypt (1996), or infamously The World of Tank Girl (1995)".

The supplement The World of Aden: Campaign Chronicles was published in 1996.

== Reception ==
Andy Butcher reviewed The World of Aden for Arcane magazine, rating it a 6 out of 10 overall. Butcher comments that "unfortunately, while the book succeeds at sketching out the basics of the world, it rarely finds the space to go into detail. There are a lot of good ideas here, and an inventive referee looking for a slightly different setting could do a lot worse than to pick this up, whether you're familiar with the Masterbook and D6 systems or not".

== Reviews ==
- Australian Realms #30
