= Van Richten's Guide to Fiends =

1995 role-playing game accessory by Teeuwynn Woodruff

- Cover
- Author: Teeuwynn Woodruff
- Genre: Role-playing games
- Publisher: TSR
- Publication date: May 1995
- ISBN: 978-0-7869-0122-7

Van Richten's Guide to Fiends is an accessory for the 2nd edition of the Advanced Dungeons & Dragons fantasy role-playing game.

== Contents ==
Van Richten's Guide to Fiends, a supplement for the Ravenloft campaign setting discusses the nature, powers and motivations of fiends.

== Publication history ==
Van Richten's Guide to Fiends was written by Teeuwynn Woodruff, and published by TSR, Inc.

== Reviews ==
- Rollespilsmagasinet Fønix (Danish) (Issue 10 - October/November 1995)
