= Corsaire =

Corsaire (French for "corsair" or "pirate") may refer to:

- Le Corsaire, a ballet by Joseph Mazilier to music by Adolphe Adam et al., first performed in 1858
- Le corsaire, an overture composed by Hector Berlioz in 1844
- Le Corsaire (film), an unfinished 1939 French film
- Mauboussin M.120 Corsaire, a trainer and touring aircraft built in France beginning in the 1930s
- Corsaires de Dunkerque, a French ice hockey team

== See also ==
- Corsair (disambiguation)
