= Masterbook Companion =

1996 role-playing game supplement

MasterBook Companion
- 1st edition, West End Games
- Publishers: West End Games
- Publication: 1996
- Genres: Generic role-playing

MasterBook Companion is a 1996 role-playing game supplement published by West End Games (WEG) for the role-playing system MasterBook.

== Contents ==
MasterBook Companion is a supplement that streamlines MasterBook gameplay by bringing together material published in previous sourcebooks. It also introduces new content. The book begins with character creation enhancements followed by new skills and equipment. A chapter on magic features ready-made spells and guidance for crafting custom ones, and vehicle combat rules (originally from The World of Tank Girl) are also featured.

The book also acts as an interface between WEG's two game systems, MasterBook and d6 System, allowing conversion from one to the other and back again.

== Publication history ==
In 1994, WEG published a generic role-playing game system titled MasterBook that was an update to their Torg role-playing system. In 1996, WEG published the MasterBook Companion supplement.

When WEG went out of business, the rights to MasterBook were acquired by Precis Intermedia, who subsequently republished several titles, including MasterBook Companion.

== Reception ==
In Issue 14 of the British role-playing magazine Arcane, Andy Butcher commented, "You can't really fault the MasterBook Companion. It achieves what it sets out to do, providing MasterBook referees with a range of new material and previously published rules in a convenient form." Butcher concluded by giving the book a rating of 7 out of 10 overall, and stated that "It's certainly not a particularly exciting release, but it is a worthwhile one."
