= Teeuwynn Woodruff =

American game designer (1966–2023)

- Born: October 25, 1966
- Died: August 28, 2023 (aged 56)
- Occupation: Game designer

Teeuwynn Woodruff (October 25, 1966 – August 28, 2023) was an American writer and game designer who worked primarily on role-playing games, television writing and interviewing, and trading card games.

== Freelancer ==
Teeuwynn Woodruff was introduced to role-playing games at an early age, playing her first game of Dungeons & Dragons when she was 11, according to Woodruff. In an interview with internet podcast called Midnight Express, Woodruff said that after college, she met some employees of TSR while attending a games convention in 1992, which led to the idea of a career as a freelance fantasy writer; subsequently she sent some material to TSR and one of her monster designs appeared in the Advanced Dungeons & Dragons adventure Assault on Raven's Ruin, while her adventure A Way with Words, co-authored with Tim Beach, appeared in Dungeon magazine in its May/June 1993 issue. Woodruff also wrote for West End Games, including the Galitia Citybook for Masterbook: Bloodshadows and Indiana Jones and the Tomb of the Templars for the Indiana Jones RPG.

== White Wolf and WotC ==
Woodruff said in an internet podcast interview that she was hired by White Wolf in 1993 as their first female game designer. While there, she wrote World of Darkness: Gypsies and contributed to White Wolf's Vampire: the Masquerade, Werewolf: the Apocalypse, Mage: the Ascension and Wraith: the Oblivion lines.

In 1995, she moved to Seattle to join the staff of Wizards of the Coast (WotC), and claimed to have been their first female game designer. Woodruff was part of the design team on a multitude of projects including BattleTech, Netrunner, Magic: The Gathering (7th edition), Duel Masters, Dreamblade, and Pokémon Trading Card Game. After WotC bought TSR in 1997, she also contributed to several Dungeons & Dragons projects including Masters of the Wild. Woodruff was on the design team with Wolfgang Baur and Mike Selinker for a role-playing game based on Magic: The Gathering, but Wizards cancelled this project in 1996. She was also on the design team for Betrayal at House on the Hill.

== Lone Shark ==
In 2005, she left WotC to form Lone Shark Games. Lone Shark also specialized in creating giant puzzles at events like Gencon, Microsoft's annual three-day employee picnic, and other industry events such as the launch party for Uncharted: Drake's Fortune.

While working at Lone Shark, Woodruff continued to freelance, interviewing participants and producers of various reality shows such The Amazing Race and Survivor, then publishing articles for now defunct RealityNewsOnline.

== Female game designer ==
Woodruff's presence in the male-dominated games industry was mentioned by a columnist Nicole Brodeur in the Local News section of the Seattle Times, who wrote, "Woodruff brings a female sensibility [...] to the male-dominated world of games and puzzles. And that is rare. [Co-founder of Lone Shark Games Mike] Selinker couldn’t name five female game designers, something he blames on 'institutional biases,' and the belief that women 'can’t handle' mathematics." In the article, Woodruff commented that "Women do play games [...] They’re just not games that men count."

== Reception to her works ==
Galitia Citybook: In the March 1995 edition of Dragon (Issue 215), Rick Swan reviewed Woodruff's book Galitia Citybook (written for West End Game's Bloodshadows RPG), and commented that "most of it's interesting, but there's nothing noteworthy." He gave the book an average rating of 3 out of 6, saying, "The lack of an adventure and the awkward narrative [...] make this an iffy buy."

Star Sisterz: Kidzworld reviewed Woodruff's collectible charm game and gave it a rating of four out of five stars, praising the game's bracelet charms and cards, but stating that the game needed multiple players to be fun and that "some of the card challenges are really lame".

== Personal life ==
Woodruff was born in 1966, and died from a cardiac arrest on August 28, 2023.

== Bibliography ==
=== RPGs sourcebooks (sole author) ===
- Galitia Citybook (Masterbook, 1994)
- Van Richten's Guide to the Created (Advanced Dungeons & Dragons 2nd edition, 1994)
- The World of Species (MasterBook, 1995)
- World of Darkness: Gypsies (WoD, 1995)
- Van Richten's Guide to Fiends (Advanced Dungeons & Dragons/Ravenloft, 1995)

=== Games (author) ===
- Star Sisterz (collectible charm game, 2004)

=== RPG adventures (author) ===
- A Way with Words (with Tim Beach), Dungeon magazine #41
- With Dead Desire, White Wolf Magazine #46 (Wraith: The Oblivion)
- Into the Midnight, White Wolf Magazine #47 (Wraith: The Oblivion)

=== Short non-fiction ===
- Bazaar of the Bizarre: Wonderful & powerful, indeed – new figurines of wondrous power (Dragon Issue 196, August 1993)
- "Lord of the Rings" (in Hobby Games: The 100 Best, edited by James Lowder, Green Ronin, 2007)
- "Boggle" (in Family Games: The 100 Best, edited by James Lowder, Green Ronin, 2010)

=== Short fiction ===
- Good Wood (2018)
