= Indiana Jones and the Sky Pirates and other Tales =

Indiana Jones and the Sky Pirates and other Tales is a 1996 role-playing game adventure published by West End Games for MasterBook.

== Plot summary ==
Indiana Jones and the Sky Pirates and other Tales is an adventure in which the material draws heavily from three novels—Peril at Delphi, Unicorn's Legacy, and Sky Pirates. The first part of the book summarizes the plots and characters from these stories, offers background on their settings, and suggests ways to adapt them into roleplaying adventures. It also includes hooks to involve player characters and two follow-up mini-adventures based on the novels' events.

== Reception ==
Lucya Szachnowski reviewed Indiana Jones and the Sky Pirates and other Tales for Arcane magazine, rating it a 6 out of 10 overall, and stated that "The artwork, design and production quality are generally good, but the supplement could have done with a thorough proofread. At the pivotal point of one cliff-hanger scene we are told: 'Failure to hang on results in one very messy (and very fatal) splat.' Not highly recommended."

== Reviews ==
- Fractal Spectrum (Issue 17 - Winter 1997)
