= Wamphyri (MasterBook) =

1996 role-playing game supplement

Wamphyri is a 1996 role-playing game supplement published by West End Games for MasterBook.

== Contents ==
Wamphyri is a supplement in which the Necroscope setting spotlights vampires—grotesque symbiotic entities that meld with human hosts to create powerful, twisted beings known as Wamphyri. Building upon the foundations laid in The World of Necroscope, this book furthers the mechanics for portraying vampiric infection, including detailed rules for the psychological battle between host and parasite and a host of unique vampiric abilities. Structured into three chapters and a full-length adventure, the supplement first explores the stages and effects of infection, introduces new Advantages and Compensations for vampiric characters, and expands the skill set available to them. Woven through the rule sections is a fictional diary of an agent undergoing transformation. The adventure, "Monumental Problems", spans half the book.

== Reception ==
Andy Butcher reviewed Wamphyri for Arcane magazine, rating it an 8 out of 10 overall, and stated that "As with all of the Necroscope books, Wamphyri assumes that you have read at least some (and preferably all) of Lumley's Necroscope series. Assuming you have, this is a well designed and written book that not only captures the atmosphere of the novels, but provides solid game mechanics to mode! their events. This is splendidly realised and truly horrible stuff."

== Reviews ==
- Pyramid V1, #25 (May/June, 1997)
- Fractal Spectrum (Issue 17 - Winter 1997)
