= Sick Little Sagas =

Sick Little Sagas is a 1996 role-playing game supplement published by West End Games for Masterbook.

== Contents ==
Sick Little Sagas is a supplement in which a quartet of horror adventures is presented for The World of Tales from the Crypt, with each scenario standing alone in its eerie setting and tone:

- "Bad Day at Hanging Hill" plunges players into a Wild West tale with a deranged rancher and his grotesque creations.
- "The Medusa Tree" features mysterious phenomena linked to the Delaware River, hinting at submerged horrors.
- "...But Fear Itself" drops characters into an asylum that harbors threats beyond psychological trauma.
- "Tracks of My Fears" transforms a routine train ride into a journey with no safe destination.

The adventures employ the "Shell Body" mechanic, enabling fluid character switching.

== Reception ==
Andy Butcher reviewed Sick Little Sagas for Arcane magazine, rating it an 8 out of 10 overall, and stated that "Although designed for Tales from the Crypt, all of these adventures could be fairly simply converted to a variety of horror roleplaying systems. All of them make use of the 'Shell Body' game mechanic, which allows players of The World of Tales from the Crypt to jump into the roles of many different characters, but this isn't a problem if they're to be played as one-shot adventures, and it doesn't take much to adjust the stories to fit them into an ongoing campaign. Good stuff."

== Reviews ==
- Dragon #240
