= Brain Burn =

Brain Burn is a 1993 role-playing adventure for Shatterzone published by West End Games.

== Plot summary ==
Brain Burn is an adventure in which the game setting is detailed.

== Publication history ==
Brain Burn was the first Shatterzone supplement.

== Reception ==
Jeff Cisneros reviewed Brain Burn in White Wolf #41 (March, 1994), rating it a 4 out of 5 and stated that "A very good value, this supplement provides additional information on the universe and a good adventure with additional adventure fragments [...] It's worth the price."
