= The Golden Goddess =

Tabletop roleplaying game supplement

Cover art by Clyde Caldwell, 1985

The Golden Goddess is a solo adventure published by TSR in 1985 for the action-adventure role-playing game The Adventures of Indiana Jones Role-Playing Game, itself based on the Indiana Jones movie franchise.

== Description ==
The Golden Goddess is an adventure for one player, who takes on the role of Indiana Jones in a quest to reclaim the Golden Idol that Rene Belloq took from Jones in the first few minutes of Raiders of the Lost Ark. In order to avoid spoilers, the player uses a "Magic Viewer" to read the correct paragraphs of text, following the adventure from page to page much like a Fighting Fantasy adventure.

Although the adventure is designed for solo play, reviewer Paul Mason noted that a gamemaster could adapt the adventure for use with a typical group of players.

== Publication history ==
In 1984, TSR gained the license to make a role-playing game based on Indiana Jones, and released The Adventures of Indiana Jones Role-Playing Game the same year. Over the next two years, TSR supported the game with six adventures, the fourth one being IJ4 The Golden Goddess, a 16-page softcover book with a map, viewer film, cardstock miniatures, and two outer folders written by Ed Carmien, with interior art by Jeff Easley, Jayne Hoffmann, Dennis Kauth, and Marsha Kauth, and cover art by Clyde Caldwell.

The Indiana Jones role-playing game did not sell well, and TSR eventually ceased publication and allowed the license to expire. In 1994, West End Games acquired the rights to publish their own version of a role-playing game, The World of Indiana Jones.

== Reception ==
In Issue 30 of Imagine, Paul Mason was not impressed by this adventure, calling it "actually quite a drab plot" and rating the 16-page adventure "remarkably short and dull." He concluded by suggesting players give this adventure a miss, saying, "Solo scenarios are supposed to be designed for gamers who can't find other players. Quite frankly, if you can't find players you'd be better off spending your money on trips to the cinema than buying this module."
