= Eric J. Gibson =

Game designer

- Occupation: Game designer

Eric J. Gibson is a game designer who has worked primarily on role-playing games.

== Career ==
Eric J. Gibson through his company Purgatory Publishing purchased West End Games, and the deal was announced by previous owner Humanoids Publishing on November 14, 2003. Gibson becoming the new owner of West End involved the Masterbook, D6 System and its derivative D6 Legend systems, as well as the Bloodshadows, Shatterzone and Torg settings, as well as the West End trademark. As part of his contribution to West End, Gibson made the d6 classic system into a more generic rules system. Gibson intended to publish a new edition of Torg, but only produced two Torg PDFs.

West End began having difficulty financing their publications, so Gibson offered to Bill Coffin to publish his Septimus role-playing game, but even after taking preorders Gibson did not have enough money to print the book, and announced in 2008 that Septimus was cancelled and he was dissolving West End Games. Gibson ultimately released Bill Coffin's Septimus (2009) in PDF, which would be the last product from West End Games. Gibson released his core genre books using the OGL, making the D6 system available for use to other publishers. Gibson sold the remaining properties for West End, selling Torg to German company Ulisses Spiele, and the Masterbook system with the Bloodshadows and Shatterzone settings to Precis Intermedia.

In April 2016, he sold the rest of West End Games and the D6 System to Nocturnal Media.
