= The River of God =

1992 novel

The River of God is a 1992 novel published by West End Games.

== Plot summary ==
The River of God is a novel in which a team of mercenaries find themselves in the mysterious Shatterzone.

== Publication history ==
The River of God featured the setting of the Shatterzone role-playing game, and was released before the game as the first in a novel series about the game universe.

== Reception ==
Chris Hind reviewed The River of God in White Wolf #35 (March/April, 1993), rating it a 3 out of 5 and stated that "As for this novel - The River of God - you could 'steal' ideas from it for, say, a Star Wars adventure. And if you are in the market for a science fiction RPG, maybe you should spend [the price] as a preview to Shatterzone. You might save money in the long run."
