= Galitia Citybook =

Role-playing game supplement

Cover art, 1994

Galitia Citybook is a supplement published by West End Games in 1994 for the fantasy-noir role-playing game Bloodshadows, using the generic role-playing rules of Masterbook.

== Contents ==
The original Bloodshadows campaign setting (1994) was based in the city of Selastos. Galitia Citybook describes the sister city of Galitia, with details of its thousand-year history, city districts, and notable people. The book also includes new monsters and some suggested adventure hooks, although it does not include a full adventure.

== Publication history ==
West End Games originally published the generic Masterbook set of role-playing game rules in 1994, quickly followed by the fantasy-noir Bloodshadows setting. The Bloodshadows supplement Galitia Citybook also appeared in 1994, a 128-page softcover book written by Teeuwynn Woodruff, with artwork by Tim Bobko, Tom O'Neill and Brian Schomburg.

== Reception ==
In the March 1995 edition of Dragon (Issue #215), Rick Swan was ambivalent about the book, commenting "most of it's interesting, but there's nothing noteworthy." Swan didn't like the lack of a full adventure, and criticized the writing style as "awkward". He concluded by giving this book an average rating of 3 out of 6, calling it "an iffy buy."

== Reviews ==
- Australian Realms #25
