= Rose of the Prophet =

Fantasy trilogy by Tracy Hickman and Margaret Weis

- The Will of the Wanderer (1988); The Paladin of the Night (1989); The Prophet of Akhran (1989)
- Author: Tracy Hickman and Margaret Weis
- Cover artist: Larry Elmore
- Country: United States
- Language: English
- Genre: Fantasy
- Publisher: Bantam Spectra
- Published: 1988 – 1989
- Media type: Print
- No. of books: 3

Rose of the Prophet is a trilogy of fantasy novels by Tracy Hickman and Margaret Weis. Cover art and interior illustrations by Larry Elmore.

== Reception ==
Jared Shurin of Pornokitsch has lauded the series for its progressive, inclusive characterization and its nuanced setting, while faulting its plot and dialogue; ultimately, Shurin judged it to be "yet another epic fantasy" — "silly and inclusive; diverse and dumb; enjoyable, commercial, and utterly ordinary" — whose value is its mediocrity.

== The series ==
The novels were originally published in the United States by Bantam Spectra, the Science-Fiction division of Random House.

Volume 1: The Will of the Wanderer (1988)
Volume 2: The Paladin of the Night (1989)
Volume 3: The Prophet of Akhran (1989)

== Plot ==
The Rose of the Prophet series is set in Sularin, a fictional world ruled by a slate of twenty gods, each a facet of the central god, Sul. In the normal course of events, common to fantasy literature, the values of the gods balance each other out; however, as the series begins, the gods have turned away from the Sul and the world is in peril of falling apart. Each god is worshipped by people on the mortal realm and their strength corresponds with the strength and faith of their people. At the start of the series, each god and their foil rule over certain areas in the mortal realm.

One god in particular, Quar, the god of city dwellers in a Middle Eastern style land, has decided to move to seize more and more power. Akhran, the foil of Quar, learns of Quar's ambitions and warns the rest of the gods because upsetting the balance will affect them all. The other gods mostly ignore him, unconcerned because Quar's mortal domain is far away from their own. Akhran does not have the safety of distance and decides to take his own precautions and orders the djinns of the Sheiks of the two largest nomadic tribes to marry off their children to unite the tribes. Unfortunately for all involved, the two largest tribes have had years upon years of animosity and hate each other with a passion.

The story follows Khardan, the son of one of the tribes and Zohra, the daughter of the other as they seek to save their people from Quar's ambitions. Joining them is Mathew, a traveler from a distant land and a follower of Promenthas.

== Main characters ==
- Abul Qasim Qannadi: "The Amir", General of Quar and King of the city of Kich.
- Achmed: Khardan’s brother and follower of Akhran.
- Auda ibn Jad: Dark Paladin of Zhakrin; slave-trader.
- Feisal: Known as "The Imam", priest of Quar and fanatical mujahideen.
- Khardan: Calif of the horse-herding Akar and son of Sheikh Majiid, prophet of Akhran.
- Mathew: Young wizard and follower of Promenthas.
- Zohra: Daughter of Sheikh Jaafar, of the sheep-herding Hrana, follower of Akhran.

== Immortals ==
- Asrial: Immortal of Promenthas, also Mathew’s guardian angel.
- Fedj: Djinn of Akhran devoted to Jafaar al Widjar, Zohra's father.
- Kaug: 'Efreet of Quar and main Immortal antagonist.
- Pukah: Djinn of Akhran, Pukah is the young and impetuous servant of Khardan.
- Raja: Djinn of Akhran, he serves Zeid al Saban, Sheykh of the Aran
- Sond: Djinn of Akhran, he serves Majiid al Fakhar, Khardan's father.
- Usti: Djinn of Akhran, he serves Zohra.

== The Gods ==
In the world of Sularin, there are 21 gods: Sul (the Truth) is the light of truth, and the other 20 are facets of the Truth. The nature of each god is informed by an icosahedral jewel composed of 20 triangular facets the 12 vertices of which represent divine philosophies (Good at the extreme closest to Law, Mercy, Faith, Charity, and Patience; then Evil with Chaos, Intolerance, Reality, Greed, and Impatience). This structure creates three categories of god: Good (the five facets with Good at one vertex), Evil (the five facets with Evil at one vertex), and Neutral (the other ten facets). The powers a god has depends on how many followers that god has as well as their level of devotion. Every god has his or her own plane of existence that resembles who they are. Akhran, the god of the desert nomads, mostly rides on his mighty horse in a desert he made himself. When a god grows less powerful, his plane of existence also starts to disappear.

Many of these gods seem to be patterned after the gods of various Earthly cultures.

Sul
The center of the 20-sided jewel, of which each god is a facet. It also used to mean the Sun, the Universe, the Jewel, and the God of Truth.

Akhran
Nomad-God of Chaos, Impatience, and Faith. The series centers on his followers, who live more or less bedouinesque lives. Akhran wears practical riding gear and disdains formality. His realm seems to reflect a blend of Central Asian and Arabian nomadic cultures: his followers play baigha, which bears a striking resemblance to buzkashi, and drink qumiz, commonly transliterated kumis (fermented mare's milk), and their language contains basic elements of Persian (e.g., bale = yes, spahi = a kind of horseman), Arabic (e.g., use of the honorifics Hazrat and sidi to refer to respected figures), and more. His plane of existence is a desert. When the belief in him has faded, he lost his plane of existence and was forced to enter the planes of other gods in order to communicate with them.

Quar
God of Reality, Greed, and Law. Quar, known occasionally as "the Lawful," wears stereotypical and ornate garb of a burnoose and silk turban. The main antagonist of Akhran. This god almost took over the entire world through his priest Feisal. The latter started an entire jihad in order to make Quar the only god in existence. He is also very opportunistic and cowardly. His plane of existence is a beautiful palace garden. When his powers are waning, the garden starts to rot away.

Promenthas
God of Goodness, Charity, and Faith. Promenthas shares similarities with a standard Roman Catholic image of God: white beard, cassock and surplice, and hosts of angels and archangels. One of the few gods to encourage independence and study of the natural world by limiting personal contact with divine entities (such as Immortals). His plane of existence is a cathedral.

Zhakrin
God of Evil, Intolerance, and Reality. Seems to be killed by Evren at the beginning of "Will of the Wanderer." Later, however, it is revealed that Quar imprisoned Zhakrin's and Evren's essences inside two fish. Zhakrin's knights, the Black Paladins, got their hands on the fish and planned to restore Zhakrin's powers through a dark ritual. Mathew successfully stops the ritual, but the essences of both gods are freed.

Evren
Goddess of Goodness, Mercy, and Faith. She seems to die from exhaustion (from killing Zhakrin) at the beginning of "Will of the Wanderer." Later, however, it is revealed that Quar imprisoned Zhakrin's and Evren's essences inside two fish. Zhakrin's knights, the Black Paladins, got their hands on the fish and planned to restore Zhakrin's powers through a dark ritual. Mathew successfully stops the ritual, but the essences of both gods are freed. It is revealed that Evren sends Asrial temporarily away from Mathew so the young wizard would end up at castle Zhakrin in order to free both gods.

Benario
"The Thief" God of Faith, Chaos, and Greed.

Kharmani
Wealth-God of Faith, Mercy, and Greed.

Hammah
Warrior-God (attributes unknown) who wears animal skins and a horned metal helmet.

Shistar
God (attributes unknown) who sits in a tea-garden surrounded by cherry trees. Probably somewhat related to Buddhism.

Chu-lin
Meditative God (attributes unknown).

Hurishta
Underwater Goddess (attributes unknown) of the seas. Sailors throw golden rings into the sea as sacrifices to her; dolphins are considered her daughters and sharks her sons. She and Inthaban feud and their fights cause storms, according to superstitious sailors.

Inthaban
Water-God (attributes unknown) of distant seas. Sailors throw iron rings into the sea in order to appease him and his "sons," whales, so that he might not grow jealous of their treatment of Hurishta.

Astafas
Demon-God of Evil, Greed, and Reality, an enemy to Promenthas. He mostly resembles the well-known depictions of Satan. His plane of existence is pure darkness. Some of his Immortals are called imps.

Mimrim
Goddess of the Ravenchai who lives on a cloudy mountain.

Uevin
Law, Patience, and Reality. God who ruled the Bas. Bas live like ancient Greeks. Focus on politics and technology, with a Government system of City-States. His Immortals were made into 'sub-gods', each for one aspect of human life, just like the Greeks had one god for wealth, another for war etc.
