= Dragonships of Vindras =

Fantasy novel series by Margaret Weis and Tracy Hickman

- Author: Margaret Weis and Tracy Hickman
- Cover artist: Michael Komarck
- Country: United States
- Language: English
- Genre: High fantasy, Action, Adventure, Romance
- Publisher: Tor Books (US)
- Published: January 6, 2009
- Media type: Print (hardcover)

Dragonships of Vindras is a fantasy-adventure novel series by American writers Margaret Weis and Tracy Hickman.

Hickman has characterized the story as being "a modern fantasy Odyssey".

The first book, Bones of the Dragon, was released in hardcover on January 6, 2009. Book Two, titled Secret of the Dragon was released on March 16, 2010. The third book Rage of the Dragon was released on April 24, 2012. The series, originally planned for six books, was published by Tor Books. It concluded with the release of the fourth title, Doom of the Dragon, in 2016.

The authors stated in an afterword in Bones of the Dragon that the series was dedicated to Weis and Hickman's long-time friend, editor, and mentor, Brian Thomsen. Thomsen died of heart failure at 54 years old as Bones of the Dragon was going to press.

== Novels ==
- Bones of the Dragon (2009)
- Secret of the Dragon (2010)
- Rage of the Dragon (2012)
- Doom of the Dragon (2016)
