= Starshield (fiction) =

Book series

- Author: Tracy Hickman; Margaret Weis
- Genre: Galactic fantasy
- Publisher: Del Rey Books
- Published: 1996–1998
- No. of books: Two

Starshield was a proposed trilogy of galactic fantasy novels written by Tracy Hickman and Margaret Weis, and was envisioned to spin off a tabletop roleplaying game and an online strategy game. Only two of the three novels were released.

== Background ==
The backstory of Starshield involved the concept of "quantum weather", which posits that the physical laws of the Starshield universe are not universal, and can change in certain locations and conditions. In the Starshield universe, there exists a multitude of different regions with loosely fixed borders where the physical laws are completely different. In the first Starshield novel, the main character is part of Earth's first extra-solar exploration mission, and discovers the dynamism of the universe when his team crosses a border to find themselves in a region where magic not only exists, but effectively replaces Earth's own physics.

While the Starshield trilogy was meant to set the stage for future Starshield projects, the novels were not meant to live in a vacuum. Unlike other properties where derivative products are not considered official canon, Starshield was meant to strongly integrate the roleplaying game, online game, and novels into a single stream of continuous lore. In this manner, player actions in the online game would affect the state of the universe, and therefore affect future novels and roleplaying game products, while author and developer changes would filter back to the online game.

== Books ==
Only two of three Starshield novels were ever released. Initial sales of the series did not meet the publisher's expectations, and the publisher occasioned additional confusion by changing the title and requesting additional rewrites of the first book between the hard cover and mass market paperback release, and then demanded that the contract be renegotiated by the second book. Before the third book could be written, the publisher unilaterally informed the authors that the contract was being cancelled—although the contract has never been officially terminated and remains in legal limbo.

The series consists of two novels:

1. Starshield: Sentinels aka Mantle of Kendis Dai (1996) ISBN 978-0345397607
2. Nightsword (1998) ISBN 978-0345397621

== Roleplaying Game ==
New Millennium Entertainment (NME) was selected to write the Starshield roleplaying game. A reasonably complete draft of the core roleplaying game rulebook was written by Ricko Dakan, and NME intended to showcase the game at GenCon '97. The game included contribution from Alex Jurkat and Bernard Trombley at NME, though the unfinished draft was still revisions away from being publish-worthy. Beta testing and development sessions for the game included Kenneth Eitelman, Ed Healy, Frank Torkel, and Matthew Willemain, all of whom were participants of the Starshield project.

Ultimately, regular development/testing sessions stopped after NME explained to the team that Tracy Hickman had not ironed out all the contract details, and NME refused to continue work on the project without a completed contract in hand. By mid-1997, all work on the roleplaying game stopped.

== Online Game ==
The online component to Starshield was commonly referred to as the Empire Playing Game (EPG). The EPG was meant to be a web-based game in which players could populate a region of the universe with a player-created race and underlying physical laws. The core game would play much like the BBS door game Trade Wars, albeit with more player interaction through collaborative storytelling; players were urged to work with one another to develop storylines, political alliances, etc. The core rules would form the foundation for what a player's empire was capable of resource-wise, while the stories developed by the players would add depth to player encounters. Many of the concepts behind EVE Online are reminiscent of the EPG, though EPG's interface was not meant to be as graphically intensive.

All online components of the Starshield project were initially handled by InfoMagic, though even before InfoMagic's departure from the project in 1998, most of the online content for Starshield was managed by unpaid participant volunteers. Nearly all of the official canon produced outside the Starshield novels were approved and managed by these so-called "Sifters", who were selected by Tracy Hickman after a short application process.

After InfoMagic, Twin Forces was selected to work on the EPG. The EPG would have been Twin Forces' first online game, which was envisioned to work via a series of Java applets. As Twin Forces' initial design work continued, they drastically changed the direction of the game to a close-ended format, without the perpetual continuity originally promised players. Twin Forces ultimately left the project as well.

Pat Garaelb of Golden Hydra Industries pitched the idea of a BBS door game to Tracy Hickman, maintaining the close-ended gameplay Twin Forces proposed earlier. After significant community complaints, Tracy Hickman looked instead to a company promising a more graphical interface, but little further information was ever revealed.

== Final Negotiations ==
After commercial interest in the Starshield project ceased, a group of Sifters proposed forming an independent company to contract work on the various Starshield components. With Tracy Hickman's blessing, the Immersive Entertainment Group (ImEG) was formed, marking the first time an entity with appropriate background and understanding of the project was ready to tackle Starshield's future. ImEG was composed of Daniel Pond, Thomas Schruefer, and Frank Torkel. The group was responsible for refining the roleplaying game, creating maps of the Starshield universe, and significantly adding to Starshield's creative content. Despite making significant headway in developing Starshield, however, ImEG's contract negotiations with Tracy Hickman's agency proved futile, as heavy monetary investments by Hickman's agency were requested up-front, rather than considering long-term payoffs. Unable to make these payments, ImEG was not awarded an official contract. No company since has offered to develop Starshield further.

== Mars Project ==
While not tied to Starshield's canon, the Mars Project was nonetheless one of Hickman's intents. In it, Starshield's financial success would help fund the future colonization of Mars. While noted numerous times by Hickman in online meetings with Starshield participants, little additional information on the Mars Project was ever given.

In December 2022, Elon Musk's company SpaceX announced a program also called Starshield that would fund colonization of Mars by building custom military satellites.
