= Beyond the 'Zone =

Beyond the 'Zone is a 1993 novel published by West End Games.

== Plot summary ==
Beyond the 'Zone is a novel in which the space station Shatterzone One is being constructed to find a passage beyond the Shatterzone.

== Reception ==
Chris Hind reviewed Beyond the 'Zone in White Wolf #38 (1993), rating it a 3 out of 5 and stated that "Through Beyond the 'Zone is fascinating and elusive to pursue for 348 pages, the prize is finally disappointing. Read it for a couple of days of pure escapism. Just don't get too attached to any of the characters. Life is hard, after all."
