= Corsair =

A corsair is a privateer or pirate, especially:

- Barbary corsair, Ottoman and Berber privateers operating from North Africa
- French corsairs, privateers operating on behalf of the French crown

Corsair may also refer to:

== Arts and entertainment ==
=== Comic books ===
- Corsair (character), Marvel Comics character
- Corsairs Squad, a training squad in New X-Men (2004 series)

=== Novels ===
- Corsair, a 1987 nautical historical novel by Dudley Pope
- Corsair (Bunch novel), a 2001 fantasy novel by Chris Bunch
- Corsair (Cussler novel), a 2009 adventure novel by Clive Cussler

=== Music ===
- Il corsaro (The Corsair), an 1848 opera by Giuseppe Verdi
- Le Corsaire (overture), 1844, by Hector Berlioz
- The Corsairs, a 1960s doo-wop group
- "Corsair", a song on the 2002 album Geogaddi by Boards of Canada
- "Corsair", a 2007 song from the EP Voyage by In Fear and Faith

=== Video games ===
- Corsairs: Conquest at Sea, a 1999 game by Microïds
- Corsairs (Freelancer), a fictional criminal organization in Freelancer
- Corsair, an evolution to the Gambler class in Final Fantasy XI: Treasures of Aht Urhgan
- The Corsair, a persona in the Assassin's Creed: Revelations multiplayer game
- Corsair class in Black Desert Online

=== Other arts and entertainment ===
- The Corsair, an 1814 poem by Lord Byron
- Le Corsaire, an 1856 ballet based on Byron's poem
- Corsair (film), a 1931 American gangster film

== Companies ==
- Corsair Gaming (formerly Corsair Components), an American computer peripherals and hardware company
- Corsair International (formerly Corsairfly and Corsair), a French airline
- Corsair Marine, a builder of trimaran sailboats
- Corsair, an imprint of publisher Constable & Robinson

== Military ==
- Vought F4U Corsair, a US Navy World War II and Korean War fighter aircraft
- Vought SBU Corsair, a US Navy biplane dive bomber first flown in 1933
- Vought O4U Corsair, the name of two experimental biplane scout-observation aircraft, neither of which entered regular service
- LTV A-7 Corsair II, a US Navy and later US Air Force jet attack aircraft
- Vought O2U Corsair, a US Navy biplane scout and observation aircraft
- Corsair, a subclass of the Tench-class submarine, a US Navy World War II class
  - USS Corsair (SS-435), a US Navy submarine
- USS Corsair (SP-159), a private steam yacht briefly chartered by the US Navy in World War I

== Transportation ==
=== Air ===
- Cessna 425, a light aircraft originally known as Corsair
- Corsair International, a French airline subsidiary of the TUI Group
- Corsair (G-ADVB), a Short Empire flying boat flown by Imperial Airways and BOAC

=== Land ===
- Edsel Corsair, an American automobile of the late fifties
- Ford Corsair, a British car model of the late 1960s, and an Australian model of the late 1980s
- Corsair motorcycle, built by Cotton
- Corsair, a GWR Bogie Class broad gauge locomotive that was built for and run on the Great Western Railway between 1849 and 1873
- Corsair, locomotive No. 3037 of the GWR 3031 Class that was built for and run on the Great Western Railway between 1894 and 1908
- Lincoln Corsair, a compact American crossover
- Phantom Corsair, a prototype two-door sedan built in 1938

=== Sea ===
- Corsair I, a yacht built by William Cramp and Sons for Charles J. Osborn and bought by J. P. Morgan in 1882
- Corsair II, a yacht built for J. P. Morgan in 1891, which served as USS Gloucester during the Spanish–American War
- Corsair III, a yacht built in 1898 for J. P. Morgan (the last he owned), which served the US Navy in World Wars I and II, in the latter as USS Oceanographer
- Corsair IV, a yacht built for J. P. Morgan Jr. in 1930, the largest built in the US
- Corsair (dinghy), a class of sixteen-foot three-handed sailing dinghies

== Other uses ==
- Corsair (Novell), a former operating system and user interface project for NetWare
- Onitsuka Tiger Corsair, a type of running shoe from Onitsuka Tiger
- Corsair Bay, a bay in Lyttelton Harbour, Canterbury New Zealand
- The Corsair (Santa Monica College newspaper), the student newspaper of Santa Monica College, California
- The Corsair (Pensacola State College newspaper), the student newspaper of Pensacola State College, Florida

== See also ==
- Corsaire (disambiguation)
- Corsaren (The Corsair), a 19th-century Danish satirical and political weekly magazine
- Korsaren (The Corsair), a late 19th-century/early 20th-century Norwegian satirical magazine
- Corsar, a Ukrainian anti-tank missile
