= Crosshairs (Shatterzone) =

Role-playing game supplement

Crosshairs is a supplement published by West End Games in 1993 for the dystopian science fiction role-playing game Shatterzone.

== Contents ==
Crosshairs is a 64-page softcover sourcebook by Shane Hensley, with illustrations by Jamie Lombardo, Ron Hill, and Karl Waller, with cover art by Stephen Crane. The book details the planet Texaiter, where mining is the main activity, home to industrial waste and corporate corruption, and includes random encounters with notable residents.

== Reception ==
Jeff Cisneros reviewed Crosshairs in White Wolf #40 (1994), rating it a 4 out of 5 and stated that "This supplement is a valuable addition to any Shatterzone judge's campaign. The price is fair, and the amount of information imparted is worth the price. This supplement gets its primary value from the atmosphere it generates. I recommend this for all Runners who want to get a feel for the game universe."

In the March 1994 edition of Dragon (Issue #203), Rick Swan was complimentary, giving it a rating of 3.5 stars out of 6 and saying, "Of the first batch of [Shatterzone] supplements, Crosshairs is the stand-out."
