= Tracy Hickman =

American writer and game designer

- Hickman at home in 2026
- Born: Tracy Raye Hickman; November 26, 1955 (age 70); Salt Lake City, Utah, U.S.
- Occupations: Novelist, game designer
- Spouse: Laura Curtis (m. 1977)
- Children: 4
- Writing career
- Period: 1984–present
- Genre: Fantasy fiction
- Website: trhickman.com

Tracy Raye Hickman (born November 26, 1955) is an American fantasy author and designer of games and virtual reality (VR) experiences. He co-authored the original Dragonlance novels with Margaret Weis as well as numerous other books. He also designed and created role playing game material while working for TSR and has cowritten novels with his wife, Laura Hickman. He is the author or co-author of over 60 books.

== Early life ==
Tracy Hickman was born and raised in Salt Lake City, Utah. His parents instilled in him a love of reading; he recalls visiting the local bookmobile with them. Hickman took a particular interest in the science fiction genre. He graduated from Provo High School in 1974. His major interests were drama, music, and Air Force JROTC.

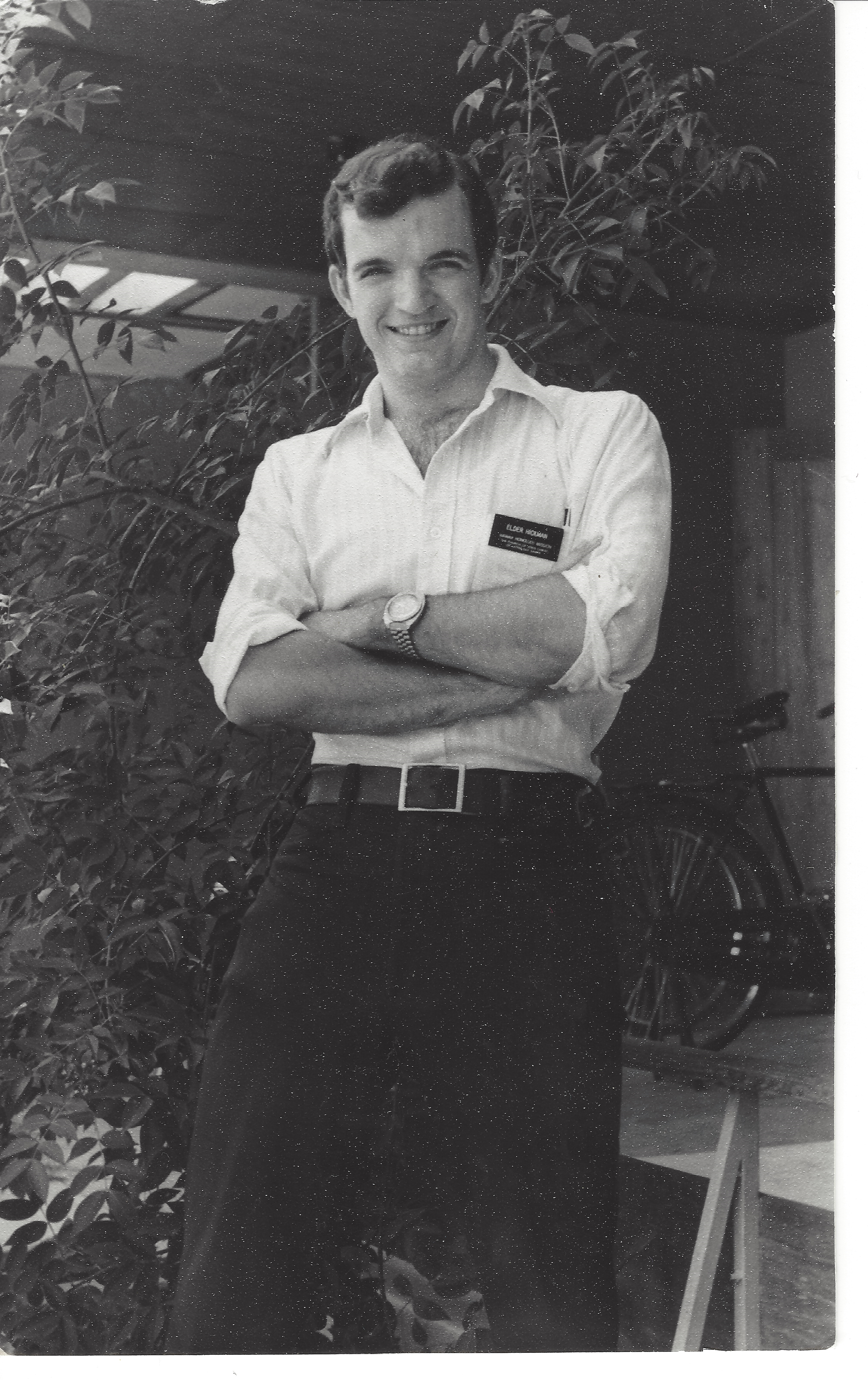
Elder Tracy Hickman as a missionary in Bandung, Indonesia circa 1976

In 1975, Hickman began two years of service as a missionary for the Church of Jesus Christ of Latter-day Saints (LDS Church). He served in Hawaii for six months while awaiting visa approval for travel to Indonesia, where he served in Surabaya, Jakarta, and the mountain city of Bandung until 1977.

Within four months of his return to the United States, Hickman married his high school sweetheart, Laura Curtis. Laura first introduced him to Dungeons & Dragons (D&D) shortly after they were married. She gave him the game that year for his birthday. Speaking on his discovery of D&D, Hickman said, "I spent part of my student loan money to buy game materials. It turned out to be the best career investment any of that money was ever used for." Laura was also the inspiration for Tracy's character Lauralanthalasa (Laurana) Kanan.

Hickman attended Brigham Young University. In an interview, he stated that he "nearly failed [his] creative writing course" in college.

== Career ==
Hickman had many jobs before joining TSR, Inc. (the publisher of Dungeons & Dragons) in 1982, including working as a supermarket stocker, a movie projectionist, a theater manager, a glass worker, a television assistant director, and a drill press operator in a genealogy center.

=== TSR ===
Together, Tracy and Laura wrote the original versions of the adventure modules Rahasia and Pharaoh, publishing them privately. Pharaoh was originally published by DayStar West Media in 1980. In 1981, Tracy entered into a business arrangement to produce an arcade immersion game, but his associate disappeared, leaving the Hickmans with $30,000 in debt. Tracy approached TSR with the modules Rahasia and Pharaoh, "literally so that I could buy shoes for my children". TSR bought the modules, and wanted to hire Tracy as well. Tracy recalls, "They said it would be easier to publish my adventures if I was part of the company. So, we made the move from Utah to Wisconsin. It was a terrifying experience. We had no money. My parents begged us not to venture into such foreign territory to pursue such a bizarre career. My father wrote that there was a secure job as a fry cook in Flagstaff (where my parents were living), and he pleaded with me to come take it."

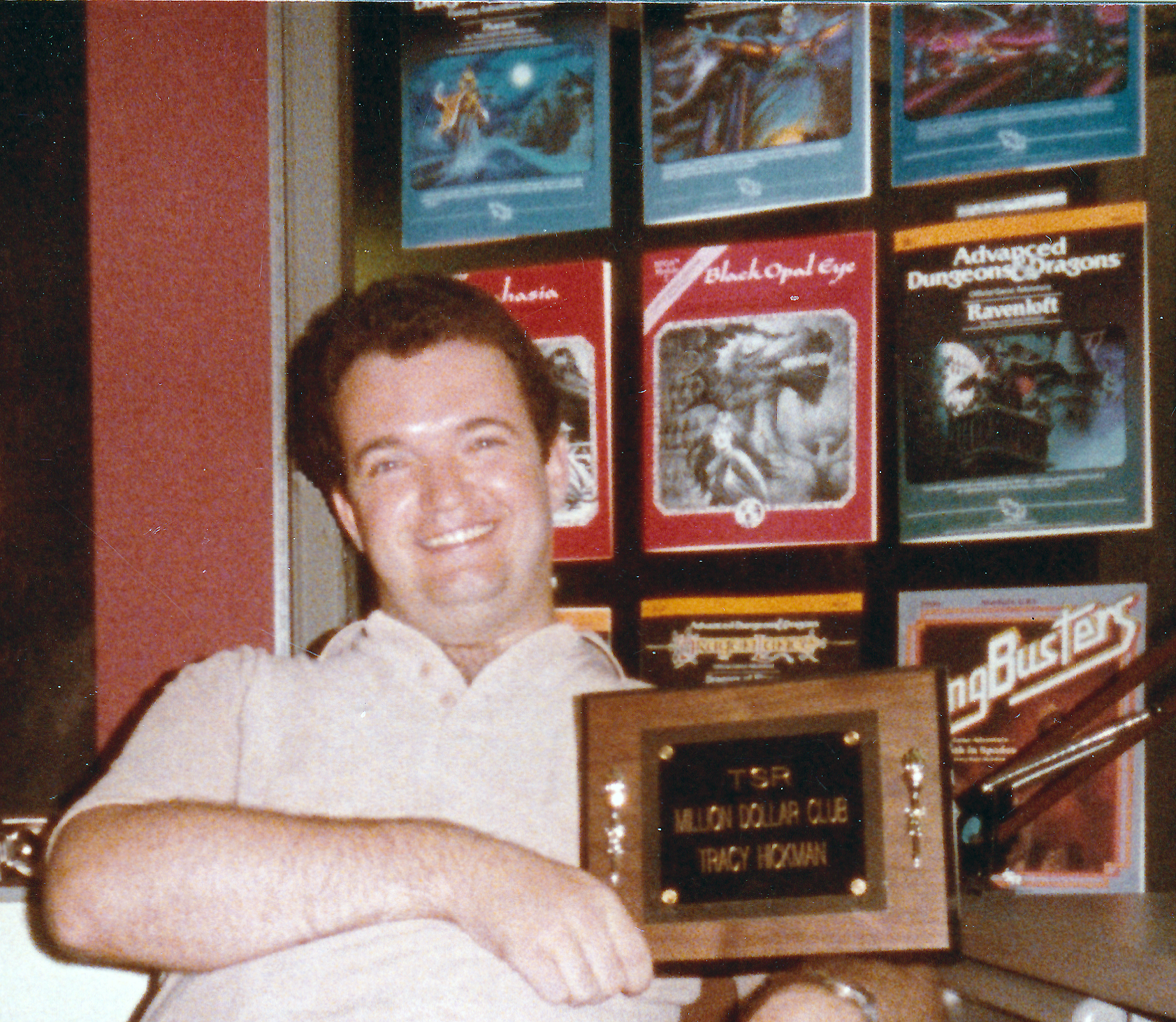
Tracy Hickman displays his "Million Dollar Club" award from TSR, Inc.

When Tracy and Laura Hickman came to TSR, they brought Pharaoh with them. It was published as the first part of TSR's Desert of Desolation series (1982–1983). Ravenloft (1983) was also written by Tracy and Laura Hickman. Hickman also wrote two supplements for TSR's Gangbusters role-playing game. Tracy and Laura Hickman's contributions to the D&D module portfolio are credited with initiating a fundamental shift in the RPG module design sensibilities, away from pure dungeon crawl and towards more "cerebral" adventures centered on intriguing plots. He also designed the Indiana Jones adventures, Crystal Death and The Fourth Nail.

=== Dragonlance ===
As he was traveling from Utah to Wisconsin to join TSR, Hickman thought of the idea for a setting in which dragons would be fearsome once again. At TSR he found other creators who were interested in his project, which was dubbed "Project Overlord". Harold Johnson was the first to join the project and brought it to upper management, and talked Hickman into expanding further upon his idea of only a trilogy of three adventures. Soon after, TSR management announced its intention to develop Hickman's series of dragon-based role-playing adventures. Hickman's proposal resulted in the Dragonlance Chronicles, which led to his association with Margaret Weis. Jean Black, the managing editor of TSR's book department, assigned Hickman and Weis to write first the novel Dragons of Autumn Twilight and then continue with the rest of the Dragonlance Chronicles series. This was the first project TSR had undertaken that would include adult novels as well as games, calendars, and other spin-off products. It was also Hickman's first novel writing experience. The original Dragonlance team was formed under Hickman's leadership. The project began with a novel and three game modules. It eventually expanded a trilogy of books (written by Weis and Hickman) and 15 companion modules. After completing the Dragonlance Chronicles, Hickman and Weis next wrote the Dragonlance Legends trilogy, which was published in 1986. Dragonlance eventually expanded to include dozens of books, many written by other authors. By 1987, the Dragonlance project had sold two million books and half a million adventure modules. It garnered "a large and engaged fan base". Hickman and Weis developed a system of co-writing in which Weis is the writer and Hickman is the "storyteller and world builder" for the project. The last Dragonlance books to be published were released in 2007.

In March 2019, Hickman and Weis were contracted by Wizards of the Coast, the new publisher of Dungeons and Dragons, to write another installment of the Dragonlance series. A new trilogy of books was planned to be published by Random House. Wizards of the Coast reportedly approved the first manuscript in the beginning of 2020, and Hickman and Weis had also finished the draft for the sequel. Wizards of the Coast then put a stop to the project, and Hickman and Weis responded by suing the publisher for breach of contract on October 16, 2020, requesting $10 million in compensation. The authors later dropped the lawsuit in December 2020 and announced that Del Rey Books would publish the new Dragonlance trilogy, with a publication date to be announced. Hickman and Weis see the new trilogy as "the capstone to their life's work". In December 2021, it was announced that the first novel of the new series, Dragonlance: Dragons of Deceit, is scheduled for release on August 9, 2022.

=== Novelist ===
==== Gaming fiction ====
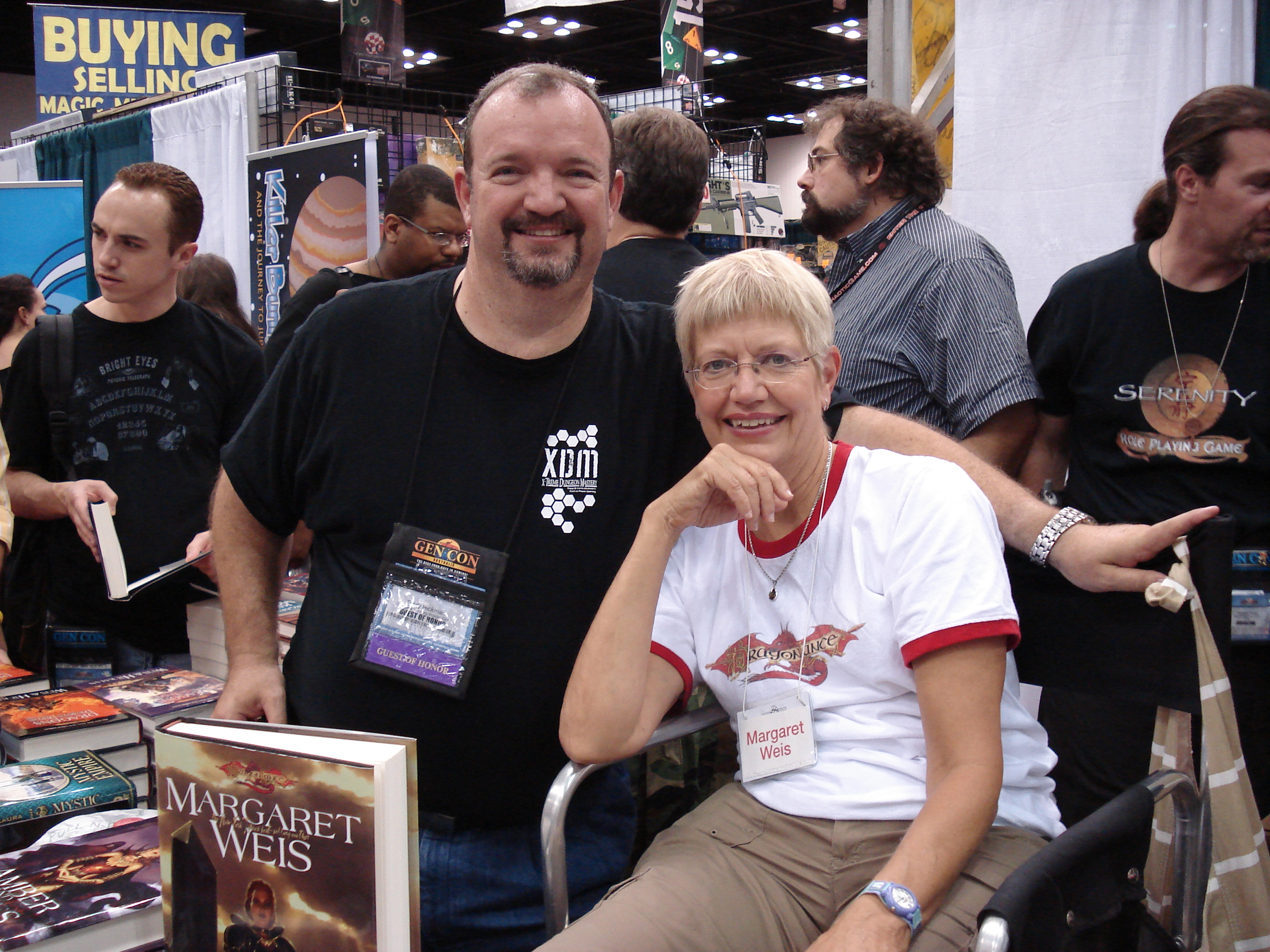
Tracy Hickman (left) and Margaret Weis at Gen Con Indy 2008.

Hickman left TSR in 1987. He has published more than 30 novels with Margaret Weis. Together they wrote the Darksword trilogy and The Death Gate Cycle, and collaborated on the Rose of the Prophet series (1988–1989). Weis and Hickman later returned to TSR to write more new fiction, although TSR turned their intended trilogy into a single novel, Dragons of Summer Flame, published in 1995.

Tracy and Laura Hickman have been publishing game designs together for over 30 years, including the popular and innovative Dungeons & Dragons Ravenloft module in 1983. The Hickmans originally developed Ravenloft as a way to entertain their friends every Halloween. Says Hickman of the original module, and its 1986 sequel, Ravenloft II: The House on Gryphon Hill, "I still believe the original Ravenloft modules were perhaps the best that ever had my name on them." Ravenloft was revived with the release of the Hickmans' Curse of Strahd module in 2016.

For the Starshield Project, Hickman and Weis produced the Del Rey Books-published novels Sentinels (later retitled Mantle of Kendis-Dai) and Nightsword. Hickman also wrote a story set in the Starshield universe for Dragon #250 called "Dedrak's Quest". Of his and Weis's fictional setting, he said, "Starshield is a universe where a society of dragons can confront blaster-armed spacemen or wizards wielding magic staves with computer targeting", and that the Starshield Project "grew out of [his] desire to share the creation process with all [their] fans." According to Hickman, Starshield's ultimate purpose, and his biggest dream, was to finance a permanent colony on the planet Mars by 2010. Readers were able to freely download both the first novel in the series and the Starshield roleplaying game from Hickman's website.

In the late 1990s, Larry Elmore asked Weis and Hickman to write novels for his fantasy world of Loerem, and they agreed to produce the Sovereign Stone trilogy. With encouragement from Peter Adkison, Wizards of the Coast published a new trilogy of Dragonlance novels by Weis and Hickman called War of Souls, beginning with Dragons of a Fallen Sun (2000).

In 1999, Pyramid magazine named Tracy Hickman one of The Millennium's Most Influential Persons, "at least in the realm of adventure gaming". The magazine stated that Tracy Hickman and Margaret Weis were "basically responsible for the entire gaming fiction genre". Hickman was inducted into the Origins Hall of Fame in 2002, recognized in part for "one game line turned literary sensation: Dragonlance". Tracy and Laura Hickman wrote the adventure Out in the Black (2006) for the Serenity Role Playing Game for Margaret Weis Productions.

In 2009, Hickman released XDM: X-Treme Dungeon Mastery, a guide for DMs based on his years of experience in the trade. Written with his son Curtis Hickman and illustrated by online comic artist Howard Tayler, the book calls itself "the cure for the common game". The Hickmans have hosted "Killer Breakfasts", popular role-playing game experiences, at Gen Con conventions in various locations.

==== Miscellaneous writing ====
In spring 1996, Hickman's first two solo novels, Requiem of Stars and The Immortals, were published. The Immortals is a science fiction novel about "AIDS concentration camps in Utah". Of the novel, Hickman said: "I was absolutely driven to write that book. I was able to say many things that I felt strongly about and still do. It is perhaps my finest work." Tracy and Laura Hickman published their first joint novel, Mystic Warrior, in 2004.

Hickman then released two new fantasy series: the four-book Dragonships of Vindras series (co-written with his longtime writing partner Margaret Weis), and the three-book Annals of Drakis series (co-written with his wife, Laura).

In 2010, Tracy and Laura Hickman launched a direct-to-internet serialized fantasy series, "Dragon's Bard", which merged serial publishing techniques (such as those employed with Charles Dickens' A Tale of Two Cities) with modern internet distribution. Eventide, the first book in the Tales of the Dragon's Bard series, was subsequently published by Shadow Mountain Publishing in 2012. Hickman has said that Eventide was his favorite project to work on.

While primarily known for his work in epic fantasy, Hickman once wrote a Batman novel for DC Comics titled Wayne of Gotham (June 2012). The book explores the characters of Bruce Wayne's parents.

=== Other work ===
Tracy and Laura Hickman produced their DragonHearth podcast until about December 2010. Hickman founded the Parsec Awards alongside Mur Lafferty and Michael Mennenga in 2006.

Hickman wrote the screenplay for, produced, and edited the first science-fiction film shot completely in space, Apogee of Fear. In August 2008, it was announced that Hickman would travel to the International Space Station, where his digitized DNA and samples of his writing would be stored in a capsule as part of "Operation Immortality", sponsored by NCSoft. Game developer Richard Garriott gathered information from people around the world (contributed through a website) to store in the capsule. On the topic of the project, Hickman said, "I have lived my entire life dreaming of space. 'Operation Immortality' is essentially a celebration of that same adventuring spirit and an offering of hope for the future. I am deeply honored to participate."

On March 15, 2013, Hickman joined Richard Garriott's team as lead story designer for Shroud of the Avatar: Forsaken Virtues. Shroud of the Avatar is the "spiritual successor" to Garriott's previous work in the fantasy role-playing genre, the Ultima series of video games.

On March 16, 2016, Hickman announced that he had become the Director of Story Development at The Void, a virtual reality gaming experience franchise, working with his son Curtis in designing interactive adventures.

== Personal life ==
Hickman married Laura Curtis in 1977, and together they have four children. In addition to the books he has co-written with his wife, Hickman has collaborated with her on ideas for his works since the beginning of his career. The two have worked closely together on numerous projects. Tracy and Laura Hickman have appeared together at multiple conferences and conventions, including the Writing and Illustrating for Young Readers conference.

Hickman is a devout member of the LDS Church. He has stated that he likes writing in the fantasy genre because it "is about ethical and moral choices—the questions of good and evil" and because it reflects "the story of all of us on our journey through mortality and our seeking to return home to Christ". Hickman has said that his faith often inspires his work. As of 1998, the family resides in St. George, Utah.

== Appearances ==
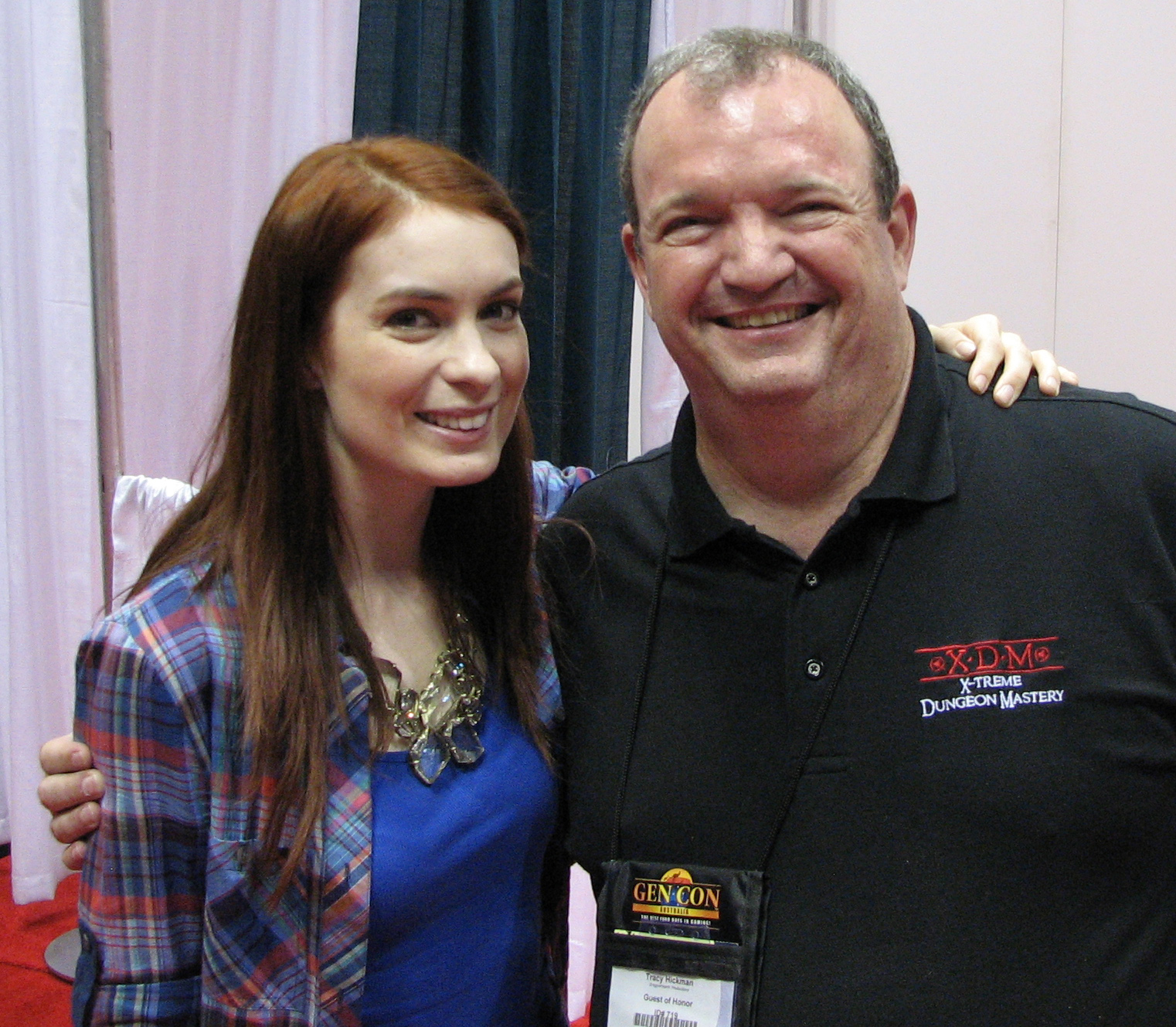
Felicia Day & Tracy Hickman at Gencon 2010

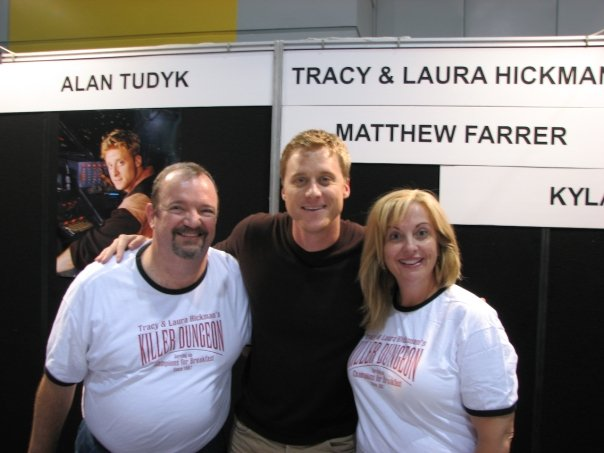
Tracy Hickman, Alan Tudyk and Laura Hickman at the Gencon OZ Convention

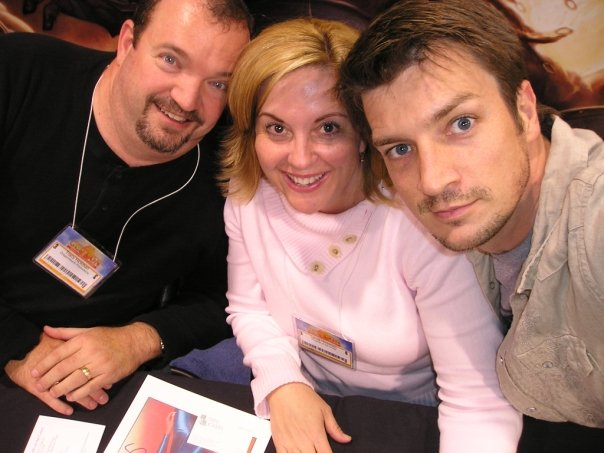
Tracy Hickman, Laura Hickman and Nathan Fillion at Gencon SoCal

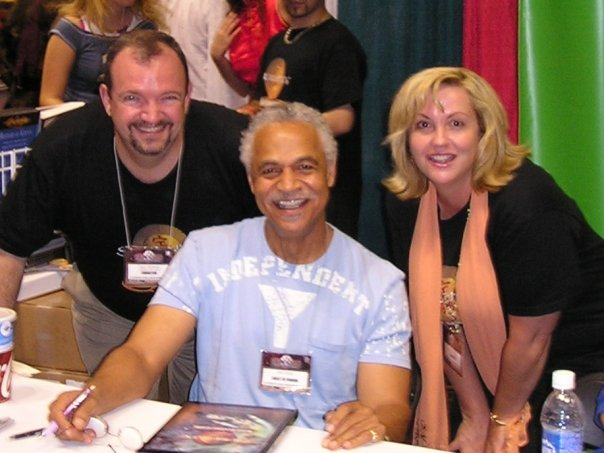
Tracy Hickman, Ron Glass and Laura Hickman at Gencon

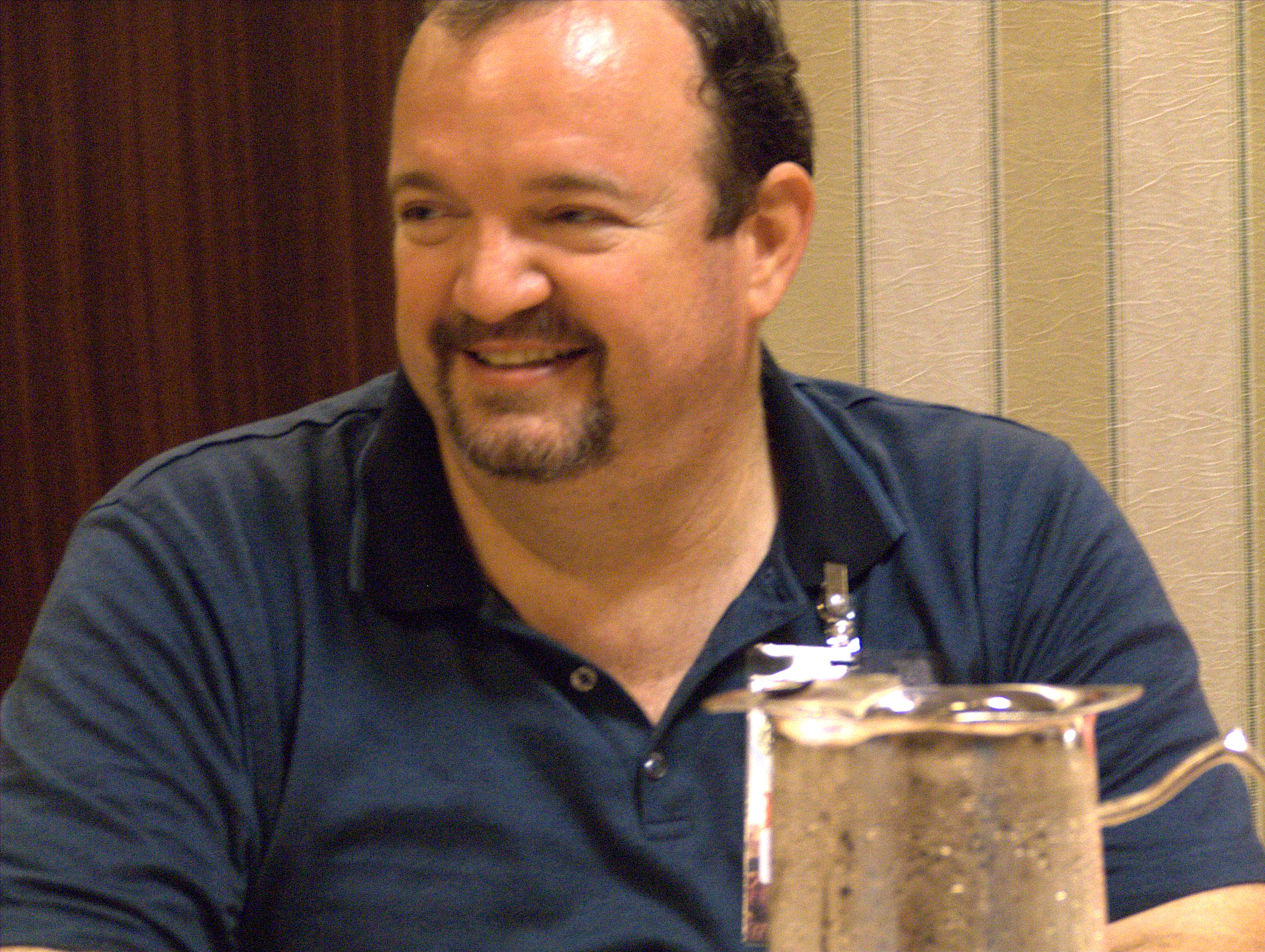
Tracy Hickman at DragonCon 2006
