= The World of Indiana Jones =

- Publishers: WEG
- Publication: 1994
- Genres: Period adventure/alternate history
- Systems: MasterBook, D6 System

The World of Indiana Jones is a role-playing game published by West End Games, based on the Indiana Jones franchise. West End Games acquired the rights to publish an Indiana Jones role-playing game ten years after the publication of TSR's The Adventures of Indiana Jones Role-Playing Game (1984).

== History ==
A role-playing game based on the Indiana Jones movies was produced by West End Games (WEG) in 1994, called The World of Indiana Jones. It was designed by Brian Sean Perry and was offered in a boxed set, and several adventure modules were written for it. Two sets of pewter miniatures were marketed for use with the game.

== Setting ==
The setting of the game is historical, 1930s pulp era. Players can choose to set aspects of the game at any point in the mid-to-late 1930s. Some adventure packs establish a particular timeline, while others are left to the player's discretion.

== System ==
WEG published The World of Indiana Jones game using its Masterbook system. The supplement Indiana Jones Adventures (1996) included conversion rules for using the D6 System instead.

=== Characters ===
The game gave players the option of creating their own characters for The World of Indiana Jones setting.

=== Themes ===
The source books were very detailed with information that went beyond what was seen in the films.

== Reception ==
In Issue 17 of Shadis, Jolly Blackburn commented "I've become enthralled with West End Games' new role-playing game, The World of Indiana Jones ... Here's one movie tie-in worthy of the effort. I could hardly wait to crack the box and begin exploring fabulous ruins while Nazis followed closely on my heels." However, Blackburn thought there was not enough background material, commenting, "The books are almost completely devoid of any material on ancient ruins or tombs in which the characters can don their pith helmets and khakis and get down to some serious dungeon crawling."

== Products ==
- Indiana Jones and the Rising Sun. Bill Olmesdahl & David Pulver (WEG, 1994)
- Raiders of the Lost Ark. Peter Schweighofer (WEG, 1994)
- Indiana Jones and the Tomb of the Templars. Ken Cliffe, Greg Farshtey & Teeuwynn Woodruff (WEG, 1995)
- Indiana Jones and the Lands of Adventure. Sanford Berenberg, Bill Smith & John Terra (WEG, 1995)
- Indiana Jones and the Golden Vampires. James Estes, Evan Jamieson, Brian Sean Perry & Lisa Smedman (WEG, 1995)
- Indiana Jones and the Temple of Doom. Adam Gratun, Evan Jamieson, Richard Meyer (WEG, 1996)
- Indiana Jones Adventures. John Robey, Peter Schweighofer, George Strayton, Paul Sudlow, Eric S. Trautmann(WEG, 1996)
- Indiana Jones Artifacts. Scott Baron & John Terra (WEG, 1996)
- Indiana Jones and the Sky Pirates and other Tales. Greg Farshtey & John Terra (WEG, 1996)
- Indiana Jones Magic & Mysticism; The Dark Continent. Lee Garvin (WEG, 1997)
