= The Adventures of Indiana Jones Role-Playing Game =

Pulp adventure role-playing game

- Designers: David Cook
- Publishers: TSR, Inc.
- Publication: 1984
- Genres: Period adventure/alternate history
- Systems: Custom

The Adventures of Indiana Jones Role-Playing Game is a licensed pulp style action-adventure role-playing game published by TSR in 1984 that is based on the Indiana Jones movie franchise.

== Publication history ==
In 1984, TSR gained the license to make a role-playing game based on Indiana Jones. It was released as a boxed set designed by John Byrne and David "Zeb" Cook, with artwork by Robert Amsel, Larry Elmore, Dennis Kauth, and Dave "Diesel" LaForce. A set of pewter miniatures was also marketed in 1984 for use with the game, which the players could choose to use instead of the cardboard cutouts that were provided with each book.

Although a number of adventures and supplements were published in 1984 and 1985, the game did not sell well. The company eventually allowed the license to expire, and publication stopped. All unsold copies of the game were destroyed at that time. (Employees at the UK office of TSR Hobbies mounted a portion of the burnt remains of the last copy in a small pyramid trophy made of Perspex. Beginning in 2000, the trophy became known as the "Diana Jones Award for Excellence in Gaming".)

In 1994, West End Games acquired the rights to publish their own Indiana Jones role-playing game, The World of Indiana Jones.

== Setting ==
The setting of the game is historical, 1930's pulp era. Players can choose to set aspects of the game at any point in the mid-to-late 1930s. Some adventure packs establish a particular timeline, while others are left to the player's discretion.

== System ==
Designed for 2 to 8 players, the game is run and scenes are laid out by a game master, called a referee. Each adventure pack specifies which of pre-made characters are available to be played, and provide a character dossier which displays their attributes, abilities, and a health chart. Provided maps, tables, and cut-out game pieces represent the setting and characters, and are used to determine character positioning, range, line of sight, and movement.

=== Characters ===
The players choose one of seven pre-made characters based on those from the movies: Indiana Jones, Marion Ravenwood, Short Round, Willie Scott, Sallah (the digger), Jock Lindsay (the pilot), or Wu Han (an old friend of Indy's).

Each character has seven attributes to decide basic factors in the game: Strength (physical strength), Movement (action speed), Prowess (manual dexterity, coordination), Backbone (courage, determination), Instinct (perception, intuition), and Appeal (personality, physical attractiveness). When a particular feat is attempted, a check is made against the character's appropriate attribute by rolling a d100. Modifiers to the roll or attribute may be applied by the referee, based on game circumstances. If one rolls lower than their modified attribute score, the action is successful. If it is higher, the action fails. Outcome is determined by the referee.

The character generation rules for the TSR game was introduced in the accessory pack IJAC1, Judge's Survival Guide, a year after the game was introduced.

=== Combat ===
Combat is done in turns, each of which equals five seconds of in-game time. Players with the highest movement attribute have the chance to act first with a check against that attribute. Whether one is able to land a blow depends on a check against their prowess attribute, and the amount of damage done is determined by a "Modified Check Table" provided in the game rules. There are three levels of damage: light, medium, and serious. The reversed number rolled for the prowess check, looked up on the provided "Action Results Table" determines where the blow landed, if not otherwise decided by the referee. Other forms of combat, such as shooting are done in the same way, only the provided maps must be used to determine range and line of sight. No formal system of hit points or determining actual character death is put forth, and instead is left to the referee as a role-play element.

=== Themes ===
Most of the themes of the game are centered on the movies and comics, with Indiana Jones and his companions procuring items of archeological importance, while battling Nazis, rival archeologists, violent natives, gangsters, and anything else the referee chooses to put forth in the storyline. Even in the prepared adventure packs, sequence results are largely left open to player determination based on referee guidance.

Many of the modules published had no specific year in which the adventure took place; however, the setting of Temple of Doom was in 1935, and the setting of Raiders of the Lost Ark was in 1936. Material from the comic series, Further Adventures of Indiana Jones was used for plots in some of the TSR publications.

== Products ==
=== Adventure packs ===
- IJ1 - Indiana Jones and the Temple of Doom Adventure Pack. Tracy Hickman & Michael Dobson (TSR, 1984)
- IJ2 - Raiders of the Lost Ark Adventure Pack. Douglas Niles (TSR, 1984)
- IJ3 - Indiana Jones, Crystal Death. Tracy Hickman (TSR, 1984)
- IJ4 - Indiana Jones, the Golden Goddess. Ed Carmien (TSR, 1985)
- IJ5 - Indiana Jones, Nepal Nightmare Adventure Pack. Marlene Weigel (TSR, 1985)
- IJ6 - Indiana Jones, Fourth Nail Adventure Pack. Tracy Hickman (TSR, 1985)

=== Accessory packs ===
- IJAC1 - Indiana Jones, Judge's Survival Johnson, Harold. (TSR, 1985)

== Reception ==
In Issue 31 of Abyss, Dave Nalle called this "a curious beastie ... the first virtually contentless RPG." Nalle pointed out that because all the events in the game are lifted directly from scenes in the movie, there is no role-playing or decision-making involved. Nalle concluded "Look, it isn't easy to review this game, there's just too much wrong for this little space."

Paul Mason reviewed The Adventures of Indiana Jones for Imagine magazine, and stated that "while the game structure is spot on, the execution is poor, making me feel overall that the game is a missed opportunity."

In Issue 22 of the French games magazine Casus Belli , Dennis Gerfaud noted "The originality of the game lies in the fact that we do not create characters: they are already there. We can only play Indiana Jones and his friends: the 'good guys' in the film." Gerfaud found the system that allows a player to use accumulated Player Points to limit combat damage "an interesting experience system." Gerfaud concluded, "Obviously, this game is aimed at true fans of Indiana Jones and Raiders of the Lost Ark.

In Issue 30 of the French games magazine Jeux & Stratégie Michel Brassinne found that the game had "all the ingredients that have made suspense films, humor and non-stop action successful. The only drawback is that the characters are defined once and for all and that they risk 'wearing out' quite quickly."

Adrian Knowles reviewed The Adventures of Indiana Jones for White Dwarf #61, giving it an overall rating of 7 out of 10, and stated that "Although I found the game to be quite enjoyable (but then I had spend [sic] the evening propping up a bar before tackling it) it only has appeal as a 'one-off' game - good for a break but unlikely to have lasting appeal. It is fun, however, and no matter what crazy stunt you attempt, Indy will survive."

Steve Crow reviewed The Adventures of Indiana Jones in Space Gamer No. 73. Crow commented that "Indiana Jones is so locked into the concept of the two movies that it is practically useless for anything outside of reenacting the movies or similar plots. FGU's Daredevils and Hero Games' Justice Inc. both take a broader look at the genre of 30s roleplaying, giving you a chance to take your life into your own hands with characters of your own creation. Indiana Jones does neither."

Russell Grant Collins reviewed The Adventures of Indiana Jones Role-Playing Game for Different Worlds magazine and stated that "In conclusion, avoid this game; if you play some other system that is set in this time period and are willing to do the conversions, the modules might be worth it, especially Raiders of the Lost Ark."

In his 1990 book The Complete Guide to Role-Playing Games, game critic Rick Swan noted the difficulty of playing with a large group, since everyone wants to play the titular character. He concluded by giving the game a rating of 2.5 out of 4, saying, "For small groups of fans willing to share the lead [role], Indiana Jones can be a lot of fun."

Five years later, while reviewing West End Games' The World of Indiana Jones in Dragon #215, Swan recalled TSR's product, and blamed its quick demise on both the "elementary mechanics" and the lack of a character creation system, pointing out that "Instead of dreaming up your own PC, you simply assumed the role of your favorite character from the films. Thus, the game ensured a flurry of fist-fights as players squabbled over who got to be Indy."

Writing for Gizmodo, Ed Grabianowski called this "absolutely terrible, a game with poorly designed rules and such a strange narrow focus, it was nearly unplayable".
