= Bloodshadows =

Role-playing game setting

Bloodshadows is a campaign setting for role-playing games, published originally in 1994 by West End Games. It was the first setting book for WEG's MasterBook generic rules engine. Bloodshadows was reprinted in 2011 by Precis Intermedia, who then published a reworked version in 2016.

== Background ==
The game is set in the world of Marl, a setting influenced by dark fantasy, urban fantasy, and pulp fiction influenced by writings of H.P. Lovecraft, Robert E. Howard, and Edgar Rice Burroughs and the roman noir of Dashiell Hammett and Raymond Chandler. It has an early 20th century industrial age base in which the technology is blended with magic.

Marl is controlled by three factions: Order, Chaos, and the Oathbreakers. Order and Chaos are like their equivalents in Michael Moorcock's Eternal Champion cycle. Order represents stability and obedience while Chaos is randomness and freedom. Neither side should get complete control, because it would mean the end of reality into total stasis or formless entropy. The conflict between them, which is played out between their followers across infinite worlds and realities, is called the GodWar. Marl last fought in the GodWar 900 years ago during their Iron Age. The conflict, in which armies from outside Marl fought there, led to the deaths of billions that devastated the planet. The Oathbreakers are pawns of Order or Chaos who renounced their former masters. Some follow a god of Order or Chaos who has broken ranks, while others reject the gods and wish to use their patrons' gifts against them. The Oathbreakers' true goals and intentions remain unknown but their actions are dragging Marl back into the GodWar.

The character races are humans and Unnaturals. Human characters don't need to take Compensations (disadvantages) unless their player wishes it. Unnaturals are the non-human races (spirits, undead, demons, and shape-shifters) who have abilities and powers but balance them off with Compensations. Humans dislike and fear the Unnaturals, who are second-class citizens. Certain Unnaturals can pass as human, can manipulate or control Humans into doing their bidding, or have useful powers that balance out their inhuman status.

Humans hide behind the walls of city-states separated by savage wilderness. The default campaign takes place in Selastos, a wilderness boom town surrounded by a desert. It is connected to the other city-states of Galitia by portals so that commerce can bypass the dangers of the desert. Selastos runs the mines and recovers GodWar-era artifacts in exchange for food and water from Galitia. Factions include god cults and wizards' guilds as well as the Oathbreakers. Galitia remains indifferent to local politics and events since Selastos keeps being profitable.

== Rules ==
The game was the first gameworld for the MasterBook system and was the only original property in the lineup. It used two ten-sided dice (d10) and a MasterBook deck of 108 cards (100 regular cards, 4 Picture cards, 2 blank cards, and 2 blank Picture cards). There were unique Picture cards for the Bloodshadows MasterBook deck ("Chaos" and "Order") that gave gameworld-unique results.

=== 1st Edition (WEG 1994) ===
==== The World of Bloodshadows (1994) (ISBN 0874313791) ====
This box set contained the softcover MasterBook rules, the softcover Bloodshadows core book, a MasterBook card deck and two ten-sided dice.

==== Sourcebooks ====
- Galitia Citybook (1994) – details the city-state of Galitia, the largest city on Marl.
- Mean Streets (1994) – this came with game-master screens and a campaign pack with NPCs, typical adventure locations with maps, and a gazetteer about the city-state of Albredura.
- The Unnaturals (1994) – details on Unnatural races and rules for creating new Unnaturals.
- Fires of Marl (1995) – background essays, short fiction, and adventures dealing with the myths and legends of Marl.
- Padarr Citybook (1995) – details the city-state of Padarr.
- Shadows of Selastos (1995) – campaign that collects the adventures Flight of Fear, The Lady is a Vamp, All That Glistens, and Trail of Riches set in the city-state of Selastos. Also includes twelve new Human and Unnatural templates.
- Sorcerer's Crib Sheet (1995) – details and expands the magic rules and adds new spells. Also contains three new character templates.
- Wilderness (1995) – a self-explanatory sourcebook.

==== Novels ====
- Hell's Feast (1994) by Greg Farshtey - gumshoe Jack Deacon gets in over his head in a case that involves a vampire client, a spellcaster hitman out to get him, and a frame-up for a crime he didn't commit.
- Blood of Tarrian (1994) by Shane Lacy Hensley - a Buck Granger mystery.
- The Fifth Horseman (1994) by Ed Stark
- Demon's Dream (1996) by Greg Farshtey - another Jack Deacon mystery.

=== 2nd Edition (WEG 2004) ===
==== D6 Bloodshadows Worldbook (2004) [ISBN 1932867066] (Softcover) ====
A conversion of the source material to using WEG's more popular D6 system. It was only published for a short time before the company went under.

=== 3rd Edition (Precis Intermedia Games 2016) ===
==== Bloodshadows: Fantasy-Noir Roleplaying (2016) ====
A rewriting and reworking of the original gamebook to fit Precis Intermedia's third edition of their genreDiversion rules system. It has conversion rules for a number of their other systems.

==== Modules ====
- Whisper of Destruction (2017) – continues the plot of the game fiction and gaming examples in the core book.

=== 4th Edition (Battlefield Press International LLC, 2022) ===
This version is being written for the Savage Worlds Adventure Edition (SWADE). It focuses on the weird mystical City of Guf, and creates new content for the setting. This version is officially licensed by Battlefield Press, Inc. from Precis Intermedia Games and was released in August 2022.

==== Bloodshadows: Chronicles of Guf (2022) ====
Core rules that cover character creation and special settings rules. Introduces the City of Guf, which recently appeared out of nowhere. One of its many mysteries is that it is populated by the remembered dead. Every loved one, friend, rival or foe a visitor has ever had resides here, but seem unaware of their past or their demise.

==== Sourcebooks ====
- Adversaries and Abominations - a sourcebook detailing powerful non-player-characters and monsters for the setting.

== Reception ==
James Estes reviewed Bloodshadows in White Wolf #48 (Oct., 1994), rating it a 4 out of 5 and stated that "I hope that other people will give Bloodshadows the chance it deserves. You might be surprised by how fun pulp-noir fantasy can be. If you already like Pulp, then Bloodshadows is a definite treat."
