= Masterbook =

Tabletop role-playing game

- Cover art by Stphen Crane, 1994
- Designers: Ed Stark
- Illustrators: Paul Daly, Jamie Lombardo, Ron Hill, Karl Waller, Brian Schomburg, Stephen Crane
- Publishers: West End Games
- Publication: 1994
- Genres: Role-playing game
- Languages: English
- Chance: Medium (dice rolling)
- Skills: Strategy, tactics, probability

Masterbook is a generic role-playing game that was published by West End Games (WEG) in 1994.

== Description ==
The generic rules of Masterbook, which do not have a specific campaign setting, use rules from both WEG's multi-genre role-playing game Torg (1990), and WEG's science fiction role-playing game Shatterzone (1993).

Like Torg, the Masterbook system utilizes two complementary forms of in-game conflict resolution: a unified dice mechanic, which is based on a roll of two ten-sided dice, and a game-specific deck of cards (the MasterDeck, similar to the Drama Deck in Torg) that is used to influence random number generation, character actions, and the game's plot.

== Publication history ==
Masterbook is a 176-page softcover book that was designed by Ed Stark, with interior art by Paul Daly, Jamie Lombardo, Ron Hill, Karl Waller, and Brian Schomburg, and cover art by Stephen Crane. It was published by WEG in 1994. A limited-edition 483-page hardbound version was made that also included the World of Bloodshadows and World of Indiana Jones material in one volume.

It was designed for use with the MasterBook Deck (also designed by Ed Stark), which contained a 108-card deck of playing-card size. It came in three types of effects. The 83 black Enhancement cards are handed in by the player for random benefits, like a bonus on a character's task roll, temporarily allowing extra actions, or granting extra Life Points. (Note: To clarify, Life Points are experience points that can be spent to increase Attributes or Skills. One Life Point can be converted into 3 Skill Points. They can also be used to add a bonus to a skill roll before it's rolled, negate wounds, or shift a result on a table.) The 17 red Subplot cards are used immediately by the Game Master to create a random event or encounter. The four Picture cards (Disaster, Opportunity, Wild, and Interloper) are Wild Cards that can provide special effects that the gamemaster can tailor to their needs. The remaining 4 were two blank cards and 2 blank Picture cards. The deck was sold separately from the standalone rule book, but a free deck was enclosed with each worldbook box set. Expansions to the MasterDeck come with 12 blank cards and 24 Plot Development cards, which are Subplot cards that the players control that potentially could grant extra Skill Points. (Note: Skill points are experience points that can be spent to increase skills. They can also be spent to reroll a failed skill roll)

=== MasterBook 1E (1994) ===
The Masterbook system was used for several licensed properties. It was also used for their proprietary fantasy-noir setting Bloodshadows. Each softcover worldbook came in a box set with a copy of the MasterBook rules, a MasterBook deck, and a pair of 10-sided dice.

- The World of Bloodshadows box set (1994)
  - Galitia Citybook (1994) - Details the City-State of Galitia, the largest city on Marl.
  - Mean Streets (1994) - GM companion. Comes with 2 two-panel game-master screens and a campaign pack with NPCs, typical adventure locations with maps, and a gazetteer about the City-State of Albredura.
  - The Unnaturals (1994) - Details the non-Human Unnatural races and contains rules for creating new Unnaturals.
  - Fires of Marl (1995) - A mix of background essays, short fiction, and adventures dealing with the myths and legends of Marl.
  - Padaar Citybook (1995) - Details the City-State of Padaar.
  - Shadows of Selastos (1995) - Collects the adventures Flight of Fear, The Lady is a Vamp, All That Glistens, and Trail of Riches set in the City-State of Selastos. Also includes twelve new Human and Unnatural templates.
  - Sorcerer's Crib Sheet (1995) - Details and expands the magic rules for Bloodshadows and adds new spells. Also contains three new character templates.
  - Wilderness (1995) - Details the unexplored Wilderness outside the City-States.
- The World of Indiana Jones box set (1994)
  - Raiders of the Lost Ark Sourcebook (1994 Hardcover)
  - Indiana Jones and the Rising Sun (1994) - Details 1930s Japan. Contains the adventure Indiana Jones and the Masamune Blade
  - Indiana Jones and the Golden Vampires (1995) - Details 1930s San Francisco. Includes the adventure Indiana Jones and the Golden Vampires set in San Francisco's Chinatown.
  - Indiana Jones and the Lands of Adventure (1995) - Details Europe, the Middle East, South America and the Orient in the 1930s.
  - Indiana Jones and the Tomb of the Templars (1995) - A collection of three adventures: The Druid's Curse, The Sword in the Stone, and The Tomb of the Templars.
  - Indiana Jones and the Temple of Doom Sourcebook (1996 Hardcover)
  - Indiana Jones Artifacts (1996) - Magic items.
  - Magic & Mysticism: The Dark Continent (1997) - Magic rules. Also has rules for the creation of PCs and NPCs with magical powers.
- The World of Aden box set (1995) - Includes conversion notes from the MasterBook system to the D6 System.
  - The World of Aden: Campaign Chronicles (1996) - A rules companion that helps immerse the game master and players in the gameworld.
- The World of Necroscope box set (1995) - A worldbook based on the horror fiction of Brian Lumley's Necroscope series.
  - Deadspeak Dossier (1995) - A gamemaster companion for The World of Necroscope that further details the espionage horror/thriller gameworld. It also contains new espionage skills and abilities.
  - Wamphyri (1996) - A guidebook detailing the Wamphyri race.
  - The E-Branch Guide to Psionics (1996) - Psionics rules and new equipment. Includes 15 psychic character templates and a MasterBook to D6 System conversion guide.
  - Operation: Nightside (1997) - A globe-spanning campaign for The World of Necroscope.
- The World of Species box set (1995)
- The World of Tank Girl box set (1995)
- The World of Tales from the Crypt box set (1996)
  - Cryptic Campaigns (1996) - New adventures for use with the worldbook.
  - Sick Little Sagas (1996) - More new adventures

=== MasterBook 2E (2011) ===
In 2011, MasterBook was re-printed by Precis Intermedia Gaming. They are currently working on an improved second edition, called MasterBook 2E, (Note: As of October 13, 2020 the MasterBook 2E rules are still in a Beta form. They are currently in an annotated Playtest version. This is available in a PDF bundle with the reprinted MasterBook 1E rules.) and have released a free simplified version, called MasterBook EZ. (Note: As of September 22, 2020 the MasterBook EZ rules are currently in Version 2.5 .)

In 2016 Precis Intermedia printed the new Bloodshadows 3rd Edition worldbook. It has conversion rules for use with the Active Exploits and MasterBook EZ rules.

== Reception ==
In the March 1995 edition of Dragon (Issue #215), Rick Swan was not enthusiastic about the rules, which he found too derivative of the rules from Shatterzone that he had roundly criticized in a previous edition of Dragon. But while Swan found the rules less complex than the original Shatterzone rules, he still found that "while less confusing [than Shatterzone, Masterbook] can't get over its love affair with charts and numbers." He did find several strong elements, including "a well-written text, an intriguing selection of skills, [and] a clever use of cards." And he lauded the included card deck, which he found "inventive, fun to use, and in contrast to the rest of the rulebook, blessedly succinct." He concluded by giving the book an average rating of 4 out of 6, saying, "even with its flaws, the Masterbook system remains a solid, versatile game with strong characters and clever concepts. The designers just didn’t know when to quit."

Pyramid magazine reviewed MasterBook and stated that "MasterBook is West End's entry into the generic RPG sweepstakes. Mechanically, it's more traditional West End than state of the art (or, if you prefer, trendy). West End games are traditionally a bit rules heavy, and MasterBook carries on that tradition, rather than trying to buy into the rules-lite paradigm of hot systems like Storyteller and its ilk. Complexity wise, the game falls squarely in the familiar generic territory staked out by Hero, GURPS and Role Master."

== Publications ==
There were two core rule books. One was included with the boxed sets and the other was sold separately. Apart from the cover, they were both identical. A Masterbook Companion book also compiled rules from the boxed set world books. The world books were only available in their dedicated box sets. This may have had an effect on sales, due to the world books not being available separately.

There were several licensed properties released using the Masterbook, but only Bloodshadows and World of Indiana Jones found success. These two were both later rewritten for West End Games D6 system, which had been adapted from their more popular Star Wars: The Roleplaying Game.

== Other reviews ==
- Shadis #26 (April, 1996)
