= 1985 Origins Award winners =

Gaming award winners

The following are the winners of the 12th annual (1985) Origins Award, presented at Origins 1986:

== Charles Roberts Awards ==
Category	Winner	Company	Designer(s)
Best Pre-20th Century Game of 1985	Pax Britannica	Victory	Greg Costikyan
Best 20th Century Game of 1985	World In Flames	Australian Design Group	Greg Pinder, Harry Rowlands
Best Fantasy or Science Fiction Game of 1985	Wabbit Wampage	Pacesetter	Mark Acres
Best Professional Boardgaming Magazine of 1985	The Wargamer	World Wide Wargaming	Keith Poulter ed
Best Adventure Game for Home Computer of 1985	Silent Service	Microprose	Sid Meier
Best Graphic Presentation of 1985	Pax Britannica	Victory	Ted Koller, Jim Talbot
Best Amateur Magazine of 1985	VIP of Gaming	DTI	

== The H.G. Wells Awards ==
Category	Winner	Company	Designer(s)
Best Historical Figure Series of 1985	25mm Samurai	Ral Partha	Bob Charrette, Dennis Mize
Best Fantasy or Science Fiction Figure Series of 1985	Dragon of the Month	Grenadier Models	Andy Chernak, John Dennett
Best Vehicular/Accessory Series of 1985	1/3900 Starship Miniatures	FASA	Ab Moshar
Best Miniatures Rules of 1985	AD&D Battlesystem	TSR	Doug Niles
Best Roleplaying Rules of 1985	DC Heroes RPG	Mayfair Games	Greg Gordon
Best Roleplaying Adventure of 1985	Yellow Clearance Black Box Blues (for Paranoia)	West End Games	John M Ford
Best Roleplaying Supplement of 1985	Pendragon Campaign	Chaosium	Greg Stafford
Best Professional Roleplaying Magazine of 1985	Dragon Magazine	TSR	Kim Mohan ed
Best Professional Miniatures Magazine of 1985	The Courier	Courier Publishing	Dick Bryant ed
Best Play-by-Mail Game of 1985	Illuminati	Adventure Systems	Draper Kauffman
