= Tobin's Spirit Guide (West End Games) =

Role-playing game supplement

Tobin's Spirit Guide is a 1989 role-playing game supplement published by West End Games for Ghostbusters, which is based on the popular movie Ghostbusters.

== Contents ==
Tobin's Spirit Guide was first mentioned in the 1984 movie as a reference guide to common types of ghosts; it was also mentioned in the 1986–1989 animated series The Real Ghostbusters. This supplement for the role-playing game was named after the fictional book and presents Ghostbusters International game statistics for nearly fifty supernatural creatures.

== Publication history ==
Tobin's Spirit Guide was written by Kim Mohan with Robert S. Babcock, with art by Timothy Mullen, and was published by West End Games in 1989 as an 80-page book.

In 2016, Insight Editions published an unrelated book of the same title written by Erik Burnham to tie in with the release of the Ghostbusters reboot movie. The book features concept art from the new movie and interviews with some of the actors and producers.

== Reception ==
Stewart Wieck reviewed Tobin's Spirit Guide for White Wolf #20, and gave it a perfect rating of 5 out of 5 overall, stating that "If you play GBI [Ghostbusters International], this supplement is a better buy than any adventure West End Games could possibly produce for the game."

In the September 1990 edition of Dragon (Issue #161), Jim Bambra gave the book a strong recommendation, saying, "Here's lots more of the pesky slimes for your Ghostbusters to trap."
