= GURPS Alternate Earths =

1996 supplement for the GURPS role-playing game

- Designers: Kenneth Hite; Craig Neumeier; Michael S. Schiffer
- Publishers: Steve Jackson Games
- Publication: 1996; 30 years ago
- Genres: Alternate histories
- Systems: GURPS third edition

GURPS Alternate Earths is a GURPS role-playing game supplement by Kenneth Hite, Craig Neumeier, and Michael S. Schiffer, which was published by Steve Jackson Games in 1996. It presents six alternate histories from the real world, and background material for creating adventures for each of these worlds.

== Contents ==
GURPS Alternate Earths presents six versions of Earth possessing alternate histories from that of our own world, as well as a number of less-detailed alternate settings scattered throughout the book in sidebars. Attention is given to the ways in which agents of the Infinity Patrol presented in GURPS Time Travel and their rivals from the mysterious parallel known as Centrum attempt to influence the course of history in each parallel. There is a sequel volume, GURPS Alternate Earths II, and the concept of the conflict between the Infinity Patrol and Centrum across the many parallel Earths was made central to the Fourth Edition of GURPS as the default setting in the Basic Set and in the supplement GURPS Infinite Worlds.

=== Dixie ===
Dixie posits an alternate history where the Southern filibuster William Walker, as President of Nicaragua, chose to protect Cornelius Vanderbilt's Accessory Transit Company rather than turn on his tycoon supporter. Without Vanderbilt's opposition to his regime in this timeline, Walker was able to conquer Cuba and make his Nicaragua the most powerful nation in Latin America. During the American Civil War, Walker's ships ran the Union blockade and ensured that Southern troops were well-supplied, leading to their victory over Northern forces and the independence of the Confederate States of America. In turn, the United States allied themselves with Germany and took most of Canada from the Confederacy's British supporters while the Confederates absorbed Mexico and most of Central America.

The current year in Dixie is 1985, with the world dominated by the US, the C.S.A., the moribund German Empire, the nascent Russian Republic, and the rapidly modernizing United Republic of India. Technology is more advanced than at the same date in our world, with personal hovercraft and supersonic transports commonplace, and the presence of nuclear-armed orbital weapons platforms and the juxtaposition of the progressive "Yankees" and the stratified "Southron" society adds to the tension caused by the "Long Drum Roll" (the US-C.S.A. analogue to the Cold War).

=== Reich-5 ===
Reich-5 (so named because it was the fifth parallel world discovered by the Infinity Patrol in which Nazi Germany had won World War II) takes as its point of divergence from real history the successful assassination of president-elect Franklin D. Roosevelt by Giuseppe Zangara in 1933. While vice president-elect John Nance Garner attempted to implement Roosevelt's New Deal, he was unable to unify the country. U.S. politics seesawed back and forth between radical left- and right-wing administrations under Henry Wallace and Charles Lindbergh, with the country as a whole mired in isolationism and a continuing Great Depression, while Germany and Japan fought and won World War II, conquering the Allies without American involvement. In 1944, following Japanese attacks against American targets across the Pacific, including Pearl Harbor and the West Coast, Vice President William Dudley Pelley seized control of the nation after the assassination of Republican president Charles Lindbergh; the German invasion of Canada in the following year gave Pelley an excuse to arrogate to himself dictatorial powers. His theft of the 1948 election from Robert Taft (running on a combined Republican/Democratic ticket) prompted a Second American Civil War that was ended by a Nazi invasion of the United States and their development and use of the atomic bomb in 1950 against American cities.

The "current year" in Reich-5 is 1995. Greater Germany dominates Europe, Africa, and India, while the U.S.A. is little more than a puppet state of Nazi Germany, with a resistance movement only just recovering from a brutal defeat in the Uprising of '76. The Japanese Empire controls China, Southeastern Asia, Australia, New Zealand, Oceania, the Eastern Soviet Union, and the entire Pacific Rim.

=== Roma Aeterna ===
Roma Aeterna diverged from real history when Nero Claudius Drusus survived his German campaigns and founded a different Julio-Claudian dynasty than in our history. Their patronage of the Heronian Academy led to a more rapid development of industry, which produces in the Roma Aeterna setting a very different world in which the Third Roman Empire based in Hesperia (roughly corresponding to Mexico and Texas) rules much of North and South America, Northern Africa, Europe, the Middle East, and India. The only other significant political entities in the world are Serica (China) and its North American kingdom Fu-Sang (centered on San Francisco), Taehan (a growing empire based on the Korean Peninsula), and the isolationist South American kingdom of Huaraca. The "current year" in Roma Aeterna is 1878.

=== Shikaku-Mon ===
Shikaku-Mon ("four-cornered world" in the local version of Japanese, because of the four super-power nations that dominate it) is a setting proceeding from a point of divergence in the early 16th century - the survival of Juan of Aragon, son of Ferdinand II of Aragon and Isabella I of Castile, to ascend the throne of Spain as John III. Without the Spanish throne to inherit from John's sister Joanna of Castile, Holy Roman Emperor Charles V was unable to fight France, the Ottoman Empire, and the Protestants of Europe as he did in our history. Combined with the redirection of Sebastian of Portugal's attentions from Inquisition and Crusade to missionary activity in Asia, especially Japan, the changes to world history are innumerable.

The "current year" in Shikaku-Mon is 2015 (the same as "Homeline" Earth, setting for the "Infinity Patrol" reality, thus making it of particular interest to the IP). The Westernized and Christian Japanese Empire controls 40% of the globe but 65% of its inhabitants, most of whom are ethnically non-Japanese subjects held to be inferior peoples. The totalitarian "synarchist" Swedish Empire is similar to the Soviet Union; it controls much of the upper half of North America and exiles dissenters against the state to labor camps in the far north. The Empire of Brazil is a relatively progressive nation which dominates South America. The Kingdom of France is a scientifically and technologically advanced nation with a permanent settlement on the Moon. Shikaku-Mon can be said to partake of its own brand of cyberpunk themes.

=== Ezcalli ===
Ezcalli is dominated by the Tenochca (Aztec) Empire. In this world, Carthaginian explorers landed in South America in 580 B.C., two millennia before contact between the Old World and the New in our history. The early exchange of biota resulted in the decimation of the American peoples by Eurasian diseases, but the low technological disparity between the two continents at the time meant the newcomers could not take full advantage of this before new populations with resistance to the diseases developed. More importantly, the introduction of American animals and crops (especially the potato) gave peasant farmers a greater ability to feed themselves and prevented potentates from controlling their subjects through grain imports. This caused the nascent Roman Empire to fly apart in the 1st century CE, and the successor states were still squabbling a millennium later when the hordes of the Mongol Empire arrived.

Europe and Asia are now covered with a half-dozen Mongol khanates (the greatest of which is the Khanate of Ch'in) and dozens of semi-independent petty kingdoms that are easy targets for steam-powered Tenochca slave raids. The Tenochca have coaling stations around the world and their continental lands now stretch from the Ohio River to the northern Andes. North of the Tenochca Empire's American territories are the iron mines and weapons factories of the Hotinosavannah League (the Iroquois) to the east and the Tlingit Confederacy to the west. Africa is home to Zoroastrian Egypt, the rapidly arming southern state of KwaZulu and the Songhay Empire, inheritors of Christianity and Roman civilisation. The "current year" in Ezcalli is 1840.

=== Gernsback ===
Gernsback is a parallel that seems drawn straight from a 1930s science fiction adventure story (it is named for the editor Hugo Gernsback, founder of Amazing Stories in which many such tales appeared). Its point of divergence is the marriage of Nikola Tesla to Anne Morgan, daughter of banker and financier J. P. Morgan. In our history the pair were friends, but Tesla died penniless; in Gernsback, their marriage stabilized Tesla, whose inventions went on to revolutionize the world, especially his perfection of a technique for broadcasting electrical power wirelessly. Tesla's brother-in-law J. P. Morgan, Jr. and his companies became instrumental in helping the world's economies recover from the ensuing stock market crash. German and American influence was crucial to the success of the League of Nations in Gernsback; when atomic power was developed in the late 1930s, its World Science Council was placed in charge of nuclear research.

Joseph Stalin's Soviet Union saw the potential of atomic energy as a weapon, but the League of Nations sought to forestall the misuse of knowledge in this manner by invading in 1951. The "current year" in Gernsback is 1965; the League of Nations dominates a world which is economically dominated by the World Science Council and socially frozen (especially in matters of race and gender) in the 1930s. The appeal of Gernsback as a setting is less in its alternative history than in its alternative science and retro-futuristic style; its technological development followed a completely different path in the 20th century than did our world (flying cars are ubiquitous, but the transistor has yet to be developed).

== Publication history ==
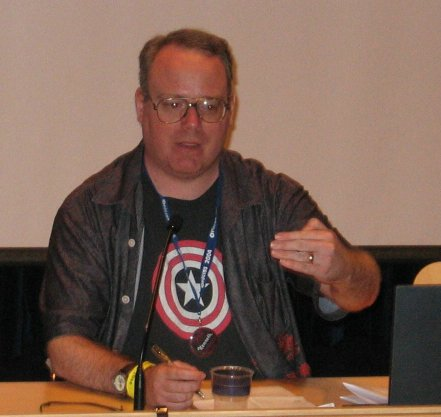
Hite in 2006

GURPS Alternate Earths was published by Steve Jackson Games in 1996, and written by Kenneth Hite, Craig Neumeier and Michael S. Schiffer. A sequel, GURPS Alternate Earths II was published in 1999.

== Reception ==
Jim Swallow reviewed GURPS Alternate Earths for Arcane magazine, rating it a 7 out of 10 overall, and stated that "Each chapter gives us a fresh Earth presented in a common format. Sections include a political world map, a history, a list of important locales, details of technology and society, ideas on character types and adventure seeds. While the material inside Alternate Earths could be created by any ref with time to study, that luxury isn't often available, and this book makes a fine resource."

Rick Swan reviewed GURPS Alternate Earths for Dragon magazine #236 (December 1996). He called the book an "off-the-wall, one-of-a-kind" game supplement which turned out to be one of "the best in many a moon". He stated that "Alternate Earths presents six parallel worlds with haywire history, such as the Confederate States of America (where the Omaha Black Sox play the Mexico City Aztecs in the World Series) and Reich-5 (where you-know-who won World War II)." Swan also noted that the book is "adaptable", saying that the material "translates to other game systems with a minimum of tweaking", and also that the book is funny: "Alternate Earths features rock star Jerry Lee Swaggart and time traveling Nazis".

== Other reviews ==
- Valkyrie #13.
- Alarums & Excursions #261.
- Shadis #30 (1996)
- Casus Belli #98
- Australian Realms #30

== See also ==
- List of GURPS publications
