= Scared Stiffs =

Tabletop comedy role-playing game supplement

An Ethereal Adventure
- Cover art by Fred Oppenheimer
- Designers: John M. Ford; Bill Slavicsek
- Publishers: West End Games
- Publication: 1987; 38 years ago
- Genres: Comedy
- Systems: D6 System
- ISBN: 0-87431-062-8

Scared Stiffs is an adventure published by West End Games in 1987 for the light-hearted role-playing game Ghostbusters, itself based on the movie of the same title.

== Contents ==
The Ghostbusters (player characters) are going to be the guest speakers at the first annual convention of the Quasi-Unearthly Association of Clairvoyants, Kismetologists and Spiritologists (QUACKS for short), but soon find themselves at the center of an alien plot to steal Earth's ghosts.

== Publication history ==
Following the success of the 1984 movie Ghostbusters, West End Game published the licensed role-playing game in 1986, and immediately followed that with two adventures the same year, Hot Rods of the Gods and Ghost Toasties. A third adventure, Scared Stiffs was released in 1987, a 32-page softcover book with a cardstock map, written by John M. Ford and Bill Slavicsek, with interior art by Timothy Meehan and cover art by Fred Ottenheimer.

== Reception ==
Graeme Davis reviewed Scared Stiffs for White Dwarf #92, and stated that "A nice adventure, exactly in the spirit of both film and game, Scared Stiffs is well worth a look from all Ghostmasters. But then you didn't need me to tell you that."

== Other reviews ==
Gateways Vol. 2 Issue 5 (August 1987, p.27)
