= Jack Crane (artist) =

- Known for: Fantasy art

Jack Crane is an artist whose work has appeared in role-playing games.

== Early life and education ==
Jack Crane enlisted in the United States Air Force and during the Vietnam War he worked for four years as an intelligence analyst, spending one of those years in the region during the Tet Offensive. After being honorably discharged he started taking classes at the Philadelphia College of Art and won their 1975 Illustration Department's Senior Class Competition.

== Career ==
Jack Crane showed some samples of his artwork to Kim Mohan of Dragon at a local fantasy and science fiction convention, and Mohan invited him to contribute black and white illustrations and six color covers for the magazine during the 1980s. After that, he did covers and spot illustrations for numerous magazines and newspapers including Esquire, The Philadelphia Inquirer, the Philadelphia Evening Bulletin, Philadelphia Magazine, and the Detroit Free Press.
