= GURPS Alternate Earths II =

1999 supplement for the GURPS role-playing game

- Designers: Kenneth Hite; Craig Neumeier; Michael S. Schiffer
- Publishers: Steve Jackson Games
- Publication: 1999; 27 years ago
- Genres: Alternate histories
- Systems: GURPS third edition

GURPS Alternate Earths II is a supplement for the GURPS role-playing game by Kenneth Hite, Craig Neumeier and Michael S. Schiffer. It was published in 1999 by Steve Jackson Games.

== Contents ==
Like GURPS Alternate Earths, Alternate Earths II presents a half-dozen parallel Earths with alternate histories, though one of these parallels is the world of Centrum which had previously appeared only as the mysterious and little-detailed home parallel of the antagonists from the GURPS Time Travel supplement to which both Alternate Earths titles are supplementary. The conflict between the Infinity Patrol and Centrum across the multiplicity of parallel Earths was made central to the fourth edition of GURPS as the default setting in the Basic Set and in the supplement GURPS Infinite Worlds.

=== Cornwallis ===
Cornwallis takes as its point of divergence from our history the decision of Anne Robert Jacques Turgot to not criticise the extravagances of Marie Antoinette as he did in the real world. Without the queen's enmity, King Louis XVI heeded his advice against interference in the American Revolution over that of the anti-British Charles Gravier, and also implemented Turgot's Six Reforms, which prevented the French Revolution in this timeline.

Without French support the American colonies' cause failed and the Tories in Britain acquiesced to a Second Restoration of true royal power. Monarchism became the order of the day in Europe, which eventually came under the sway of Czar Alexander II's Russian Empire. By the mid-1960s Russia found itself facing a Quintuple Alliance comprising the United Kingdom, Prussia, Austria, France, and Spain; the Great War ended in 1976 by the flight of the Romanovs and the establishment of the Russian Republic (which eventually became the Russian Dominate under General and self-declared First Citizen Boris Gromov).

The "current year" in Cornwallis is 1984, and the world is carved into colonial slices by Russia (which holds Korea, Japan and Alaska) and the Five Thrones. Mercantilist economic theory holds sway, resulting in a restrictive network of tariffs, rail gauge changes and state monopolies throughout the globe (although the theories of Friedrich Hayek are having a stimulating effect in his native Austria). The American colonies are pinned between the Atlantic and treaty boundaries set by Britain to protect the Native American peoples of the interior. Oregon Country has been used for decades a dumping ground for undesirables of all sorts (including Jeremy Bentham, Eric Blair and survivors of the "Lincoln-Lee" rebellion of 1861). Russia has been generally ignored by the Five Thrones after its defeat, but First Citizen Gromov has rebuilt its industry and plots to export revolution throughout the world.

=== Ming-3 ===
Ming-3 is a parallel universe almost entirely dominated by a Chinese empire whose fleets of exploration under Zheng He (Jeng Ho in the text) were never scrapped as they were in our history; the scenario credits the mother of the Xuande Emperor with having persuaded her son to put a final end to his voyages (her husband, the Hongxi Emperor, having opposed them during his short reign), and posits a plague that ended her life and her influence over Xuande. The plague also forces the imperial household to remain in the southern port city of Nanjing instead of moving to Beijing; accordingly, Zheng He's fleets were sustained, reached every corner of the Indian Ocean and rounded the Cape of Good Hope. Amphibious delivery of soldiers and supplies was developed out of necessity during a war with Annan province (Vietnam), which stood China in good stead when it found the need to pacify the lands in its naval trading sphere: Indonesia, the Malay Peninsula, southern India, various Arabian ports, and the eastern coast of Africa from Mogadishu to Mozambique.

When Portuguese vessels entered the Indian Ocean and seized the port of Goa in defiance of Chinese authority, a fleet was sent to round the Cape of Good Hope, captured European ports on the west coast, and landed at Lisbon in 1519. War with Portugal led to war with Spain under King Charles I which ended in victory for the Chinese and the seizure of Spain's Mexican possessions and their gold. The kings of France became the Holy Roman Emperors, but their dominance in Christian Europe came to an end when Emperor Louis II attacked what he believed to be a weakly garrisoned Iberian province. Louis and the French could not sustain the war economically; a similar fate befell England after its ships raided a Mexican silver shipment.

The "current year" is 1859; Nanjing is the effective capital of the world, the vassal realm of Datsin controls Europe from Poland to the Pyrenees, southern Africa is a de facto independent nation and a cosmopolitan outpost of Chinese culture on the edge of relatively unexplored central Africa, and the Americas are increasingly being populated with Asian rather than native subjects of the Empire. Unfortunately, imperial control is beginning to break down and many fear the Emperor has lost the Mandate of Heaven.

=== Midgard ===
Midgard diverges from real history in 860, when the Viking captains Hoskuld and Tyri set out to sack Mikligardr (Constantinople) while emperor Michael III "the Drunkard" was campaigning against the Saracens. In our history their fleet turned back; in Midgard they captured the city and were given the secret of Greek fire by religious dissidents, enabling them to destroy the Byzantine fleet on its return. With the riches of the city, a garrison left to hold it, and Greek fire, the Vikings' future raids against southern Europe were vastly more successful. Combined with the effects of the invasions of Europe by the Bulgars and Magyars, Christian Europe had no hope of survival.

The "current year" is 1412; the pre-eminent Norse powers are Danemark (Denmark), Svearika (Sweden), Gardarika (a Varangian-founded territory stretching across northern Eurasia), and Vinland in North America. Christianity still exists, but it must compete with Norse paganism and "Thorism", a syncretic religion where Thor fights on man's behalf in Heaven in return for fealty in the afterlife. Other political entities of note include the Ming Empire, the Yanomami Caliphate and the Kingdom of Sikel.

=== Caliph ===
Caliph is perhaps the strangest of the Alternate Earths settings. The "current year" is only 1683 but the world is technologically far in advance of our present day. The point of divergence which made this possible is the invention of the printing press in the Abbasid Caliphate during the 9th century, which enabled the emergence of an Islamic Renaissance and consequent technological development about seven centuries ahead of real history. Calculus was devised in the early 11th century, oil-powered steamships were first built in the mid-13th century, and man first walked on the Moon in 1434. The globe is divided between Dar al-Islam, the House of Islam (which comprises the four Muslim caliphates, the allied Christian Firanj (France and Germany) and China) and Dar al-Harb, the House of War, or those lands not governed by the dictates of the Ulama and the Islamic Shari'a law they define and apply to the Dar al-Islam. The secular Jamahariya Alliance (based in the New World) controls a third of the globe along with its ally, the totalitarian Caliphate of Hind (India); they are currently pushing for further conquest in an ultra-tech world that has not seen global war in centuries.

Humanity has also spread to the rest of the Solar System and to colony worlds in four other star systems accessible through FTL stargates. All humans living "beyond planetary atmospheres" are claimed as subjects of the corporation-dominated Rightly Guided Stellar Caliphate (which did so ostensibly to preserve humanity in case the fighting on Earth became genocidal in nature). Along with the reality of extraterrestrial life, the Stellar Caliphs also recently developed mainframe artificial intelligence agents called djinn, who are accepted as equals in Muslim society.

=== Aeolus ===
Aeolus breaks with our history in 1688, when the favourable winds which allowed William of Orange to safely cross the English Channel and invade England in the real world never materialized and his fleet was lost in the attempt. King James II was therefore never driven from his throne, and subsequently executed the anti-Catholic parliamentarians who had invited William to take the throne for treason. After this victory, James' Catholic sympathies were displayed openly as he ignored Parliament and allied with France. The eventual reunion of the Church of England with the Church of Rome in 1745 drove British Protestants to North America en masse; a series of succession crises and wars throughout the 19th century left 20th century Europe discontented and dissatisfied. Central Europe experienced a series of republican revolutions in the 1940s; the Republican Alliance that emerged is pinned between the Habsburg Dominions across northern Eurasia and the Bourbon Dominions of western Europe. In North America the Kingdom of Louisiane under the House of Orleans controls the most territory, though the Grand Duchy of Aleska and Mexique are also of considerable size. The American Commonwealth, a near-theocratic Protestant nation governed by a Lord Protector appointed for life, is smaller, of a size with Nouvelle France, the sole remaining colonial possession in North America.

The character of Aeolus is of a world with near-modern technology (the "current year" is 1941) in which political thought is many years behind its course of development in our world. Fortunately for the Republican Alliance, the presence of Mikhail Gurevich and Henri Coanda has given them sole possession of jet aircraft technology and, indeed, the only airplanes on the planet.

=== Centrum ===
Centrum is detailed in Alternate Earths II in greater detail than before in the GURPS line. Its point of divergence is the successful crossing of the White Ship, meaning that William Adelin, the sole male heir of King Henry I of England, was never drowned. This not only prevented the succession struggle between his sister Matilda and Stephen of Blois (and the Anarchy which followed Stephen's accession to the throne), but also led to Eleanor of Aquitaine becoming even more important to Centrum's history than she was to ours. Married not to Henry II of England but to William Adelin's son Robert the Crusader, Eleanor ruled in her husband's absence and during their son's infancy, establishing an incredibly powerful Anglo-French Empire by her death in 1204. When Mongol invasions prevented expansion into central Europe, the Anglo-French explored the Atlantic Ocean and discovered the New World. Chinese technology imported by the Mongols and royal patronage of Roger Bacon's scientific inquiries meant that, although scientific progress in Centrum was slower than in our history, it maintained a head start of around a century.

Eventually, the Anglo-French Empire dominated not only Europe but most of the globe. In 1902 the nuclear obliteration of London by parties unknown decapitated the AFE and kicked off a decade of civil war that killed more than half the world's population (mostly through unrestricted biowarfare). A military-industrial cabal based in Terraustralis (Australia), the Centrum, imposed draconian social controls in order to survive this Last War, and eventually ventured out with the aim of reconquering the globe and incorporating all humanity into a single, rational culture and social order. The development of "parachronics", the parallel-jumping technology central to the GURPS Time Travel setting, enabled Centran society to quickly recover from the war.

The "current year" in Centrum is 2015, and much of Centrum's efforts focus on resisting the influences of "Secundus" (the "Homeline" parallel which the Infinity Patrol calls home) over the parallels Centrum itself can reach and manipulate.

== Publication history ==
GURPS Alternate Earths II was published by Steve Jackson Games in 1999. Written by Kenneth Hite, Craig Neumeier and Michael S. Schiffer, it is a sequel to their earlier book GURPS Alternate Earths.

== Reviews ==
- Backstab #19

== See also ==
- List of GURPS publications
