= Send in the Clones =

Send in the Clones may refer to:

- "Send in the Clones", an episode of The Adventures of Jimmy Neutron, Boy Genius
- "Send in the Clones" (DuckTales episode), an episode of DuckTales
- "Send in the Clones" (Johnny Bravo), an episode of Johnny Bravo
- "Send in the Clones" (The Simpsons), a segment of the episode "Treehouse of Horror XIII"
- "Send in the Clones", an episode of the 6th season of Xena: Warrior Princess
- Send in the Clones (Paranoia), an adventure for the Paranoia role-playing game
- "Send in the Clones", a parody of the Stephen Sondheim song "Send In the Clowns" from A Little Night Music

== See also ==
- Send In the Clowns (disambiguation)
