= L'Empereur =

1990 video game

- North American NES cover art
- Developer: Koei
- Publisher: Koei
- Platforms: MSX, PC-88, PC-98, X1, X68000, NES, MS-DOS
- Release: MSX, PC-88, PC-98; 1990; NES: JP: May 23, 1991; NA: November 1991; MS-DOS: NA: 1991; EU: 1991
- Genre: Turn-based strategy
- Mode: Single-player

L'Empereur (Note: Japanese: ランペルール, Hepburn: Ranperūru) is a 1990 turn-based strategy video game developed and published by Koei for MSX, PC-88, PC-98, and Sharp X1. Nintendo Entertainment System, X68000, and MS-DOS versions were published in 1991.

The user controls Napoleon Bonaparte during the Napoleonic Wars of the late 18th and early 19th Centuries. The goal is to conquer Europe. The game begins with Napoleon as an army officer, but with victories in combat, the user may get promoted to Commander-in-Chief, First Consul, and finally Emperor of the French, with more powers and actions available at each level. As Emperor, the user also controls Napoleon's brothers, Louis, Jérôme, Lucien, and Joseph, as well as Napoleon's stepson, Eugene Beauharnais. The game has both military and civilian aspects. The user can lead armies, act as mayor of cities, and depending on the level achieved, engage in diplomacy with other nations. This historically accurate game reproduces many historical figures and the militaries of Europe with great detail.

Hamster Corporation released the NES version as part of their Console Archives series for the Nintendo Switch 2 and PlayStation 5 in June 2026.

== Gameplay ==
The player chooses from one of four scenarios (or loads a saved game) that starts off in different years. The earliest scenario has Napoleon as a Commander in Marseille in 1796, and historically has him poised for his invasion of Italy. The second scenario has Napoleon in St. Malo as Commander-in-Chief in 1798. The third scenario, arguably the easiest starting point, has Napoleon as First Consul of France in 1802. The final scenario, which has Napoleon as Emperor, starts in 1806, and in this mode the player can control Napoleon's siblings and stepson as well.

Each turn lasts one full month per year, for a total of 12 turns per year. Although the years change every January, it's in March that most gameplay elements are affected by the game engine (such as the drafting of soldiers and officers, the termination of certain diplomatic agreements, and the collection of taxes). In each month, the player (as well as all other commanders of cities) manage military and civil affairs for their respective cities. Additionally, every three months (starting in March), national leaders may carry out diplomatic and national affairs.

The crux of the gameplay rests in the actual battles, which take place on special tiled battlefields arranged in hexes. Opposing commanders place their armies accordingly, and then maneuver them around the battlefield into battle. Defenders have the responsibility of keeping city hexes under control while repelling the enemy while attackers have to either take all the city hexes or annihilate the defenders before they run out of food and are forced to retreat. A number of terrain features add depth to the gameplay, such as swamps, forests, hills, mountains, rivers, and tundra. Also, the seasons and weather affect battle, with invasions in the winter months causing bodies of water to freeze over and generally slowing the movement of troops. Troops on frozen water can fall if they are bombarded, as happened at the Battle of Austerlitz.

Each army may consist of three types of units: basic infantry (which can build and explode bridges), cavalry (which can charge an enemy, allowing them to repeatedly attack a unit in a single turn), and artillery (which can bombard enemies from afar). Each unit has three main factors determining how well they fight: strength, which can go up to 200 soldiers per unit; training, which affects how accurate the unit's attacks are and the speed at which the unit moves; and morale, which determines how well the unit is at absorbing attacks and avoiding falling into crippling disorder. Additionally, the unit's commanding officer, with ratings from A to D in leadership and experience commanding a unit of that type (infantry, cavalry, artillery), affects the unit's attack/defense power and morale.

As Napoleon, the player's goal is to conquer Europe. the time and size of the task requires planning and strategizing to accomplish. Each scenario presents an easier goal to achieve, which is to have Napoleon be promoted from Commander to C-in-C to First Consul to Emperor.

== Historical qualities ==
L'Empereur features a large number of historical figures, including Emperor Alexander I of Russia, King George III of Britain, the Duke of Wellington, Marshal Kutusov of Russia, General Blücher of Prussia, and Archduke Charles of Austria. Many French generals, such as Masséna, MacDonald, Davout, Soult, Lannes, Oudinot, and Berthier also appear (and give a significant advantage to France). Political figures also make appearances, such as Talleyrand, Godoy, and Metternich.

The game models several nations other than Republican and Imperial France, including the Kingdom of Naples, the Republic of Venice, Prussia, Britain, Holland, Bavaria, Spain, Portugal, the Ottoman Empire (as Turkey), Austria, Denmark, Sweden, and Russia.

Some historical events are portrayed, such as Napoleon's Invasion of Egypt, his divorce from Josephine and his marriage to Marie Louise. Napoleon's overthrowing of Barras is also portrayed, although in some events Napoleon can overthrow him peacefully.

Also modeled are Russian Cossacks and Spanish guerrillas, greatly complicating invasions of their respective countries. The Plague can also appear as a disaster.

The game further permits a recreation of the Battle of Trafalgar, which occurs whenever Napoleon attempts to invade England (or Gibraltar) from sea. In it, Nelson is killed but England gets a free naval victory over France. If the French naval force is too small, the English automatically win the combat but Lord Nelson does not die.

== Reception ==
Famitsu gave the game a 25/40 score.

Computer Gaming World disliked the game's historical inaccuracies, describing it as disappointing to those seeking a computer version of Empires in Arms or a miniature wargame. In a 1993 survey of pre 20th-century strategy games the magazine gave the game one-plus stars out of five, stating that it had "little of the ambience of the Napoleonic era" including unrealistic artillery ranges.
