= Hot Rods of the Gods =

Tabletop comedy role-playing game supplement

They're Back and They Wanna Race
- Cover art by Richard Johnson
- Designers: Daniel Greenberg
- Publishers: West End Games
- Publication: 1986; 39 years ago
- Genres: Comedy
- Systems: D6 System
- ISBN: 0-87431-052-0

Hot Rods of the Gods is an adventure published by West End Games in 1986 for the light-hearted role-playing game Ghostbusters, which is itself based on the comedy movie Ghostbusters.

== Plot summary ==
After the Ghostbusters are summoned to help a local family whose teenage daughter is mysteriously levitating, the Ghostbusters accidentally summon a gang of intergalactic juvenile delinquents to come back to the Earth. In the distant past, these aliens had started neolithic humans on the path to civilization so that the humans would build tall buildings that the aliens could then knock over. To prevent the aliens from vandalizing the Manhattan skyline, the Ghostbusters must engage them in a flying car demolition derby.

== Publication history ==
Two years after the 1984 hit film Ghostbusters, West End Games (WEG) was granted the license to publish the Ghostbusters role-playing game. WEG then published Ghost Toasties (1986) followed quickly by the second separate adventure for the game, Hot Rods of the Gods, a 48-page book with a cardstock map written by Daniel Greenberg, with interior illustrations by Timothy Meehan, and cover art by Richard Johnson.

WEG followed this up with Scared Stiffs (1987).

== Reception ==
In the August 1987 edition of Dragon (Issue #124), Ken Rolston called this adventure "a fine example of role-playing humor and staging."

== Other reviews ==
- Casus Belli #39 (Aug 1987, p.22, in French)
- Gateways, Vol.2 Issue 5 (Aug 1987, p.27)
