= Under the Wheel =

Under the Wheel is a science fiction novel anthology compiled by Elizabeth Mitchell and published by Baen Books in 1987.

== Plot summary ==
Under the Wheel is the third volume in the "Alien Stars" series, and includes "As Big As The Ritz" by Gregory Benford, "Fugue State" by John M. Ford, and "Chance" by Nancy Springer.

== Reception ==
J. Michael Caparula reviewed Under the Wheel in Space Gamer/Fantasy Gamer No. 82. Caparula commented that "I found Benford to be refreshing in short story form, away from his usual sprawling epics" and that "Ford [...] provides a surprising gem to this set" and "Springer's lively prose effectively explores the myths and realities of the female in a time governed by male principles of war and honor."

== Reviews ==
- Review by Orson Scott Card (1987) in The Magazine of Fantasy & Science Fiction, July 1987
- Kliatt
