= GURPS Infinite Worlds =

2005 supplement for the Fourth Edition of the GURPS role-playing game

- Designers: Kenneth Hite; Steve Jackson; John M. Ford
- Publishers: Steve Jackson Games
- Publication: 2005; 21 years ago
- Genres: Science fiction, Pulp, Multiple Worlds
- Systems: GURPS

GURPS Infinite Worlds is a supplement for the fourth edition of the GURPS role-playing game, published by Steve Jackson Games in 2005 and written by Kenneth Hite, Steve Jackson, and John M. Ford. It expands upon the campaign setting of conflict between the Infinity Patrol, which is the dimension-jumping agency on "our" Earth, referred to as Homeline, and Centrum across a multiplicity of alternate history Earths.

== Contents ==
GURPS Infinite Worlds builds on the idea of player characters travelling from one world to another, even across genres, for the fourth edition of GURPS.

GURPS Infinite Worlds is divided into eight chapters. Infinity Unlimited, describes the world of Homeline, one of two worlds of a parallel universe. Enemies Everywhen, describes Homeline's adversaries and hazards. Present at the Creation, describes how to create an alternate reality setting. Worlds Enough, describes 28 of the alternate worlds in the setting. ...And Time, deals with the many theories of Temporal Physics both real and fictional. Infinite characters, has setting rules and character templates Infinite Campaigns, covers the campaign's scope and direction. Alternate Infinities, provides alternatives to the Infinity setting.

== Publication history ==
GURPS Infinite Worlds was designed by Kenneth Hite, Steve Jackson, and John M. Ford, and published by Steve Jackson Games in 2005. This was presented in the Fourth Edition GURPS Basic Set (and originated in the third edition supplements GURPS Time Travel, GURPS Alternate Earths, and GURPS Alternate Earths II).

== Reception ==
GURPS Infinite Worlds won the 2005 Origins Award for Best Game Supplement.

== See also ==
- List of GURPS books
- List of campaign settings
