= The Final Reflection =

1984 novel by John M. Ford

- Cover
- Author: John M. Ford
- Language: English
- Series: Star Trek: TOS #16
- Genre: Science fiction
- Publisher: Pocket Books
- Publication date: May 1984
- Publication place: United States
- Media type: Print (Hardcover, Paperback)
- Pages: 256
- ISBN: 0-671-47388-3
- OCLC: 10739293
- Preceded by: Corona
- Followed by: Star Trek III: The Search for Spock

The Final Reflection is a 1984 science fiction novel by American writer John M. Ford, part of the Star Trek franchise. The novel provided the foundation for the FASA Star Trek role-playing game sourcebooks dealing with the Klingon elements of the game. Although not considered canon because of later developments in the Star Trek movies and TV series, the presentation of Klingon culture in this novel and Ford's 1987 follow-on, How Much for Just the Planet? is highly popular in fanon alternate depictions of Klingon society and culture. In particular, the fictional Klingon language klingonaase is introduced here, in advance of the creation of the canon version of the Klingon language, tlhIngan Hol.

== Plot ==
Particular aspects of Klingon society depicted include:

- A strong Klingon emphasis on battle-related games. The title refers to a move in klin zha, a Klingon game with similarities to chess; in this particular variation, the "reflective" game, both players take turns playing one set of pieces.
- Games played with living players.
- Military strategy is the particular province of a military class known as "thought admirals," who hone their skills in "the game with living pieces." They also seek to learn how other societies think militarily by studying the games of those people.
- The distinction between empire-building races—such as the Klingons, the Humans and Vulcans with their Federation, and the Romulans—and less driven races, whom the Klingons use as servants (kuve).

The novel concerns an intergenerational conflict within the Klingon government, between a faction wanting war with the Federation and a faction desiring accommodation for fear of Klingon defeat. The Klingon ambassador and his associates play a surprising role in this conflict, one which remains secret until the publication of a "tell-all" book forty years later, one which is read by Captain James T. Kirk in the "framing" story.

== Influence ==
In "Requiescat in Pace, John M. Ford", Eric Burns suggests that the popularity of Ford's inside look at Klingon culture, and his positive portrayal of Klingons as an honorable people by their own lights (not simply stock villains), also influenced the canonical depiction in later incarnations of Star Trek, paving the way for honor-driven Klingons like Worf, and episodes that would likewise explore Klingon culture in more depth than the original series had done.

In the Next Generation novel A Singular Destiny, Keith R. A. DeCandido includes The Final Reflection in a list of Klingon literature.

The 2017 TV series Star Trek: Discovery officially canonized at least one element introduced in the novel, the "Black Fleet" (as part of the Klingon spiritual belief in the afterlife) in its premiere episode, "The Vulcan Hello."

Season 2 of Star Trek: Picard canonized the main character when the Federation fleet arrives and one of the ships is the USS Rustazh (NCC-86503), an Inquiry-class Federation starship in service to Starfleet during the early 25th century. The ship was later seen in Season 3 as well. Production Designer Dave Blass noted that the ship was named after Krenn sutai-Rustazh as a nod to the book.

Actor Kenneth Mitchell, who played the Klingon Kol in the first season of Discovery, read The Final Reflection to prepare for the role.
