= Send In the Clowns (disambiguation) =

"Send In the Clowns" is a song by Stephen Sondheim from the musical A Little Night Music (1973).

Send In the Clowns may also refer to:

- Send In the Clowns (1974 Sarah Vaughan album)
- Send In the Clowns (1981 Sarah Vaughan album)
- "Send In the Clowns", a 2000 song by American band Cold on their album 13 Ways to Bleed on Stage

== Television ==
- "Send In the Clown", an episode of the TV series Super Mario World
- "Send in the Clowns" (Cow and Chicken), a 1999 television episode
- "Send in the Clowns", an episode of the TV series Midsomer Murders

== See also ==
- Send in the Clones (disambiguation)
