= Web of Angels =

1980 novel by John M. Ford

- First edition
- Author: John M. Ford
- Cover artist: Terrance Lindall
- Genre: Science fiction
- Published: 1980
- Publisher: Pocket Books
- ISBN: 978-0812509595

Web of Angels is a novel by John M. Ford. Written in 1980, the novel investigates the life of a hacker of the Web, an instantaneous communications network that allows some users to retrieve and store data, write computer programs, and even travel between different human worlds.

Web of Angels is often considered a proto-cyberpunk novel, predating the publication of William Gibson's 1984 cyberpunk novel Neuromancer by four years.
