= Wilderness Survival Guide =

1986 role-playing game supplement by Kim Mohan

- Author: Kim Mohan
- Genre: Role-playing game
- Publisher: TSR
- Publication date: 1986
- Media type: Print (Hardcover)
- Pages: 128

The Wilderness Survival Guide is a supplement to the Advanced Dungeons and Dragons (AD&D) role-playing game, written by Kim Mohan and published by TSR, Inc. in 1986 (ISBN 088038-291-0).

== Contents ==
The Wilderness Survival Guide provides detailed information for wilderness adventures, such as rules and guidelines relating to weather and its effects, encumbrance and movement outdoors, hunting, camping, first aid, naturally occurring hazards, fatigue for characters, pack animals, and handling wilderness combat and magic. The book also details new equipment and skills, called proficiencies, pertaining to the wilderness. The book provides an overview of the types of wilderness, including: desert, forest, hills, mountains, plains, coastal areas, and swamps.

The book details the wildness environment, including types of terrains, significant hazards, and weather. The book also covers resources for player characters, such as: expanding the proficiency system presented in the Dungeoneer's Survival Guide; appropriate clothing for various climates; clarifying normal vision, infravision and ultravision; details on how to use mounts; and rules regarding encumbrance and movement rates in the wilderness.

The book also details how the environment affects the activities of the PCs, and includes new information on survival techniques, travel on the air and water, combat in unusual outdoor circumstances, and magic.

In addition to new abilities, the Wilderness Survival Guide introduces difficulties and handicaps player characters can face, such as how sleeping in their armor may affect them and exploring how easily a fire can go out of control.

The book includes a short section called Starting from Scratch that shows how to design topography using a step-by-step method to construct a viable environment. It includes tables regarding encumbrance (for characters and animals), effects of wind on ranged weapons and statistics for waterborne vehicles, modifiers for the climbing rates for thief characters, climbing for characters other than thieves, the effects and damage caused by various temperatures, how to handle the reactions of animals, and what effects characters suffer from lack of sleep. Most of these tables are reprinted in the back of the book, along with three pages presenting different hex sizes.

== Publication history ==
Kim Mohan began working on the Wilderness Survival Guide in early April 1986, and he spent his time researching the wilderness and figuring how to translate this knowledge into rules for AD&D. The book features cover art by Jeff Easley, and was published by TSR in 1986 as a 128-page hardcover. The book features interior illustrations by Mark Nelson, Jim Holloway, Easley, Larry Elmore, and Valerie Valusek.

As it was a first edition AD&D title rendered out-of-date with the release of second edition AD&D, the book was discounted and re-packaged with the new Wild Things adventure pack in 1990 to clear out remaining stock.

In 1999, a paperback reprint of the first edition was released.

== Reception ==
In Issue 85 of White Dwarf (January 1987), Carl Sargent pointed out that this type of rulebook was harder to write than a dungeon adventures, but felt that "Mohan has pulled it off brilliantly." Sargent called the weather system "splendid", and felt that the rules on encumbrance and movement rates "make sense and work easily". He noted some odd details, such as a draft horse being able to carry 80% of the load of an elephant, and the fact that druids gain wilderness proficiencies slower than any other class. However, he felt that "for every error there are a dozen good points of details; the WSG gets proficiency checks 'right', correcting a major DSG error". He felt that the book provides valuable material not only for AD&D, but for any D&D, RuneQuest, or Middle-earth Role Playing game master. Sargent praised Kim Mohan's writing style, calling the book "the best written rulebook I've ever read; indeed, for style and content the WSG is the best AD&D book to date". Sargent concluded, "This book will revolutionize wilderness adventuring. It makes the wilderness more challenging, dangerous and exciting than almost any dungeon … Simply, the Wilderness Survival Guide is absolutely terrific."

In Issue 7 of the British magazine Adventurer (February 1987), Robin Parry pointed out the need for a DM to be prepared to deal with facts concerning the natural (and unnatural) world in order to run a credible campaign: "No book can completely alleviate the need to develop the odd interest in, say, geology or obscure tribal customs, but the Wilderness Survival Guide answers most of the questions likely to be asked when players venture in the wilds." He commented that the book "deals with the many aspects of outdoor adventuring [...] with comprehensive clarity". He called the Starting from Scratch section "sensible" and wondered "why this section is reserved for the Dungeon Master's eyes only, as it is no more revealing of pertinent facts than the rest of the book". Parry felt that the information on weather "is dealt with, as completely as anyone but the most niggling simulationist could wish. The system presented is eminently usable and covers (as do all the climatic bits) the tropic, the arctic, and everything in between." Parry found some of the tables particularly useful, "although all the tables should prove valuable sooner or later". Parry complimented the look of the book: "Another admirable Jeff Easley illustration graces the cover, the drawings inside range from good to poor. Printing and production are, as usual, good; no typos or glaring gaps." Parry concluded, "Kim Mohan has written a worthy companion volume to Doug Niles' Dungeon Survival Guide, especially considering that the subject is much broader."

In Issue 4 of the game magazine Gateways, Patricia Davis thought the book was totally focused on the wrong aspects of the game, sarcastically stating, "Instead of wasting your time allowing the players to follow a storyline, go up in levels, advance in character development and other such things, you can watch them gather dinner, set up their complex shelters (while taking into account factors like moisture and wind resistance), purify their water, and presumably take care of each others nutritional deficiencies." Davis also pointed out "All together too much space is devoted to the weather, AD&D's favorite dead horse topic." Davis concluded, "unless you really are a DM out to eliminate the players and cause them as much discomfort as possible, this is a book you can feel comfortable without."

In Issue 36 of the French games magazine Casus Belli, Pierre Rosenthal was disappointed with this book, calling it "woeful ... This supplement isn't serious; it's just fluff and filler, offering barely two or three good ideas."
