= Elise Matthesen =

American poet (born 1960)

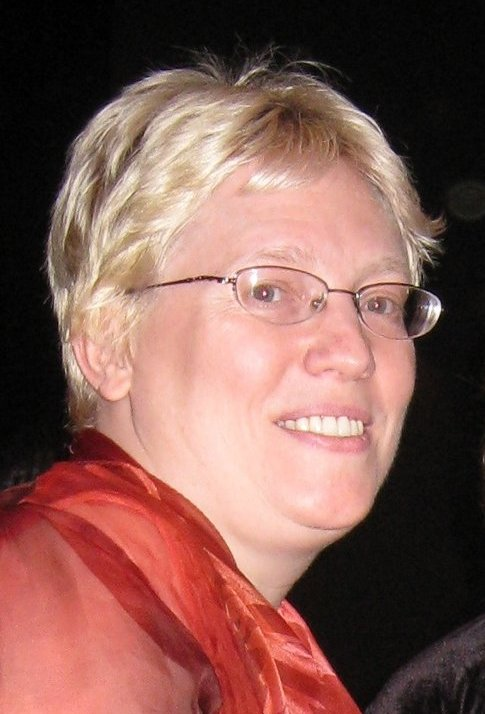
- Elise Matthesen, 2008
- Born: Elise Krueger; 1960 (age 65–66); Wisconsin United States
- Known for: Journalism, science-fiction, bisexual rights
- Movement: Interstitial Arts Movement, Bisexual Rights

Elise Matthesen (née Krueger; born 1960) is an American essayist, journalist, poet, and fiction writer (primarily of science fiction and fantasy; she is an active supporter of the interstitial arts movement), an award-winning maker of art jewelry, and a longtime bisexual rights activist. For 13 years, she was the companion of the late John M. Ford, until his death in September 2006. She lives in Minneapolis, Minnesota, and is a member of the First Universalist Church there.

== Early life ==
Matthesen was born in Wisconsin.

== Career ==
She is an anorexia nervosa survivor as well as a speaker, facilitator, and activist on issues of body acceptance, bisexuality, polyamory, and issues of self-esteem. She was one of the original contributors to the groundbreaking 1991 bisexual anthology Bi Any Other Name, has written for local LGBTQ magazine Lavender, and is an active member of science fiction fandom.

In 1993, Jane Yolen published Matthesen's short story "The Stone Girl" in the Xanadu anthology, together with works by Tanith Lee and Ursula K. Le Guin. In 2008, Catherine Lundoff published Matthesen's short story "Focus of Desire" in an anthology of lesbian ghost stories.

== Awards ==
In 2009, Matthesen was a World Fantasy Award nominee for the Special Award - Non-Professional "for setting out to inspire and for serving as inspiration for works of poetry, fantasy, and SF over the last decade through her jewelry-making and her 'artist's challenges'."

In 2020, she won the Hugo Award for Best Fan Artist, the first artist in a 3-D medium to do so.
