= Send in the Clones (Paranoia) =

Role-playing game adventure

Cover art by Jim Holloway, 1985

Send in the Clones is an adventure written by Allen Varney and Warren Spector, published in 1985 by West End Games for the light-hearted science-fiction role-playing game Paranoia. It was written by Allen Varney and Warren Spector, and consists of three short adventure scenarios involving the broadcasting star Teela O'Malley. It received positive reviews in game periodicals including White Dwarf, Casus Belli, and Different Worlds.

== Plot summary ==
Send in the Clones contains three linked mini-scenarios:

1. Sewerworld: The Troubleshooters are sent to apprehend and execute the traitors who are broadcasting subversive songs through Alpha Complex's communication system. They are saved from execution themselves by the broadcasting star Teela O'Malley.
2. Bureaucracyworld: The Troubleshooters must find and eliminate Teela as a traitor, as well as test pieces of new equipment and deal with bureaucratic red tape.
3. Entertainmentworld: The Troubleshooters become contestants in a televised game show, and discover the source of Teela's incredible popularity.

Six pregenerated characters are available for players, and each player is allowed five "lives" (clones), should their character die multiple times. The adventure also comes with a mini-boardgame, "Date with Death"; an "Information Inquiry Form"; and the Alpha Complex Songbook.

== Publication history ==
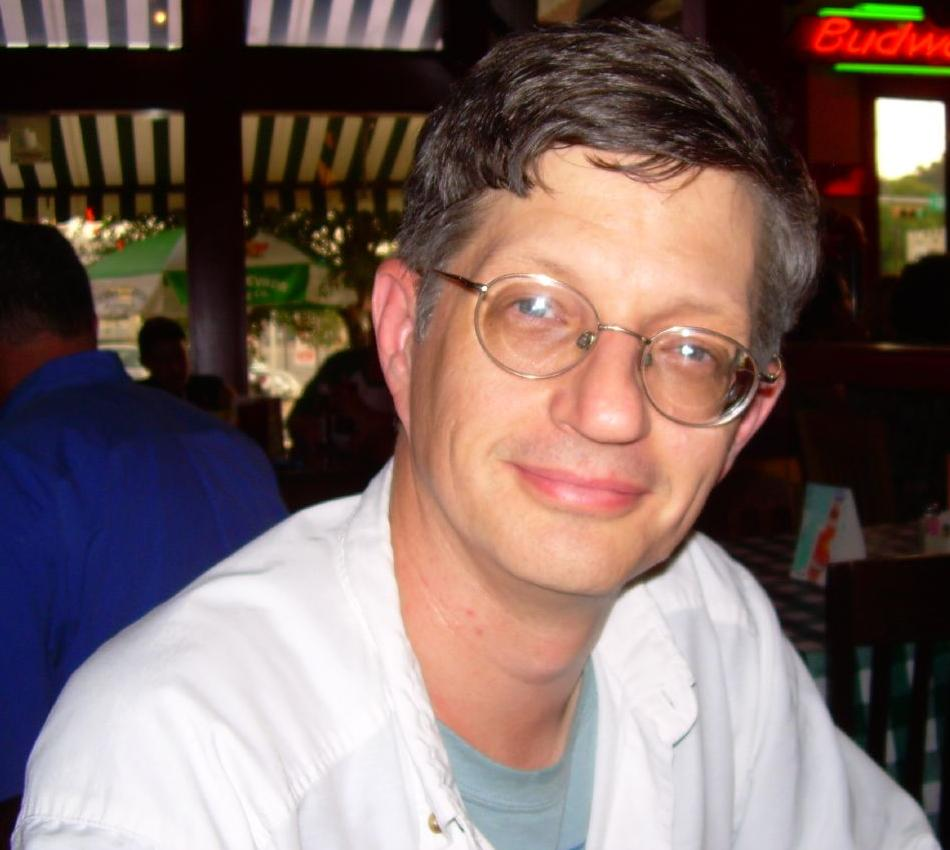
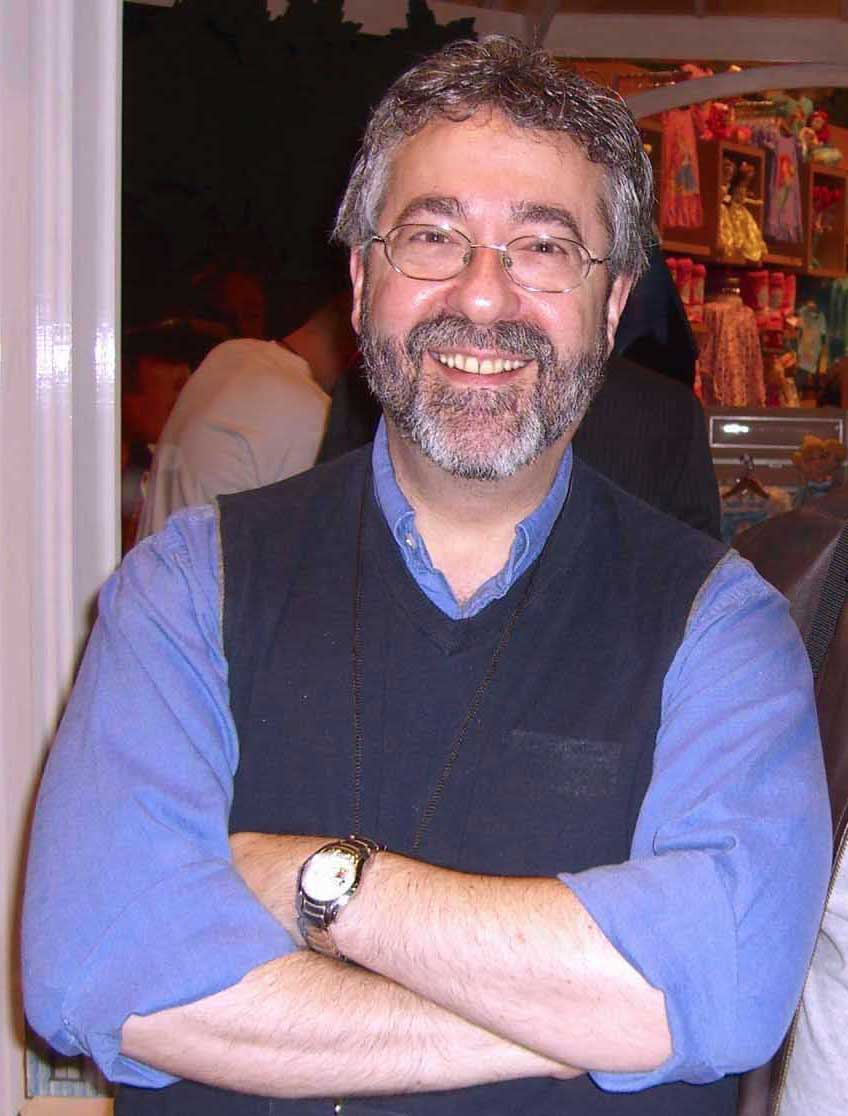
The book was designed by Allen Varney and Warren Spector.

West End Games published the first edition of Paranoia in 1984, and over the next two years, released eight adventures and supplements, including Send in the Clones, a 48-page book written by Allen Varney and Warren Spector, with art by Jim Holloway.

In his 2014 book Designers & Dragons: The 80s, game historian Shannon Appelcline noted that "Paranoia received a number of notable early supplements, including John M. Ford's award-winning adventure The Yellow Clearance Black Box Blues (1985) and Warren Spector and Allen Varney's Send in the Clones (1985)".

== Reception ==
In the April 1986 edition of the British magazine White Dwarf (Issue 76), Marcus L. Rowland found this adventure a bit too formulaic, noting that "As usual it builds into a no-win situation for the players." He also thought that it was not as funny as the previously published The Yellow Clearance Black Box Blues. He concluded by giving the game a below average rating of 6 out of 10, saying, "Too many of the situations are obviously contrived jokes, rather than logical (if absurd) results of previous actions."

In the April 1986 edition of the British magazine Adventurer (Issue 1), James Wallis thought that this adventure fit in well with the tone of previous adventures, commenting, "Like all Paranoia scenarios, Send In The Clones is well presented with humorous artwork and is very amusing to read." However, he warned that its storyline was complex, and a challenge for gamemasters. He concluded with an ambivalent recommendation, liking the adventure but railing against the price of American game products in the U.K., saying, "For experienced Paranoia GMs Send In The Clones is a good package, and I would have no hesitation in recommending it completely if it were not for the price. £6.95 for 48 pages is extremely expensive, even for a US import with a colour cover, and a fortune awaits the person who can produce a range of quality role-playing products at realistic prices."

In the Fall 1987 edition of Different Worlds (Issue 47), the reviewer warned players that this was a lethal adventure: "Clones is aptly named, because it is potentially one of the most deadly of Paranoia scenarios, too. Players had better expect to use up a sizable number of their characters' five clones before this set of related troubleshooter missions is over." The reviewer concluded by giving this adventure a perfect rating of 4 out of 4, saying, "In short, Send In The Clones is an excellent, bizarro adventure for Paranoia.

== Awards ==
- At the 1987 Origins Awards, Send in the Clones was nominated for "Best Role-Playing Adventure of 1986," eventually losing to another Paranoia adventure, The Yellow Clearance Black Box Blues.

== Other recognition ==
A copy of Send in the Clones is held in the collection of the Strong National Museum of Play (object 110.2388).

== Other reviews ==
- Game News October 1985 (Issue 8, p. 6)
- The VIP of Gaming July 1986 (Issue 4, p. 24)
- Casus Belli April 1986 (Issue 32, p. 24) and February 1987 (Issue 36, p. 20)
- Jeux & Stratégie #43 (as "Envoyez les Clones")
