= Winter Solstice, Camelot Station =

Poem by John M. Ford

"Winter Solstice, Camelot Station" is a poem by John M. Ford, about the Knights of the Round Table at a train station in Camelot. It was first published as Ford's Christmas card, and came to broader attention after Jane Yolen submitted it to Parke Godwin for inclusion in the 1988 anthology Invitation to Camelot.

== Reception ==
"Winter Solstice, Camelot Station" won the 1989 World Fantasy Award—Short Fiction, and the 1989 Rhysling Award for Best Long Poem (tied with Bruce Boston's "In the Darkened Hours").
