= Aspects (novel) =

Unfinished fantasy novel by John M. Ford

- First edition
- Author: John M. Ford
- Cover artist: Marisa Aragón Ware
- Language: English
- Genre: Fantasy
- Published: 2022
- Publisher: Tom Doherty Associates
- Publication place: United States of America
- Pages: 352
- ISBN: 9781250269034
- Website: https://us.macmillan.com/books/9781250269034/aspects

Aspects is a fantasy novel by John M. Ford. Unfinished at the time of Ford's death in 2006, it was published by Tor Books in 2022, with an introduction by Neil Gaiman.

When interviewed in 2002, Ford described it as "a sociopolitical story — the society and politics are vaguely Georgian, though the technology is steam-era Victorian — in a place where magic happens to work," further stating that he intended it to be "very long", and that it would "be done... well, when it's done."

== Synopsis ==
In the city of Lystourel, capital of the land of Lescouray, Varic is a Coron representing his people in Parliament who falls in love with Longlight, a fellow Coron. Legal reforms regarding magic and monarchy are pursued, and Varic and Longlight vacation together at Strange House.

The novel has seven chapters, and eight paragraphs of the eighth; it also includes six sonnets by Ford, each of which was intended to be the epigraph of a separate novel in a series, of which Aspects would have been the first.

== Reception ==
The Strand Magazine lauded it as "startling and beautifully deft in its execution" and a "masterpiece" in which "(p)oetic sorcery and dueling nobility have never felt so grounded, real, and alive," and considered that "the final chapters of [Aspects] are more satisfying unfinished than those of many completed novels."

Publishers Weekly praised it as "a showcase for [Ford's] lambent prose and imaginative worldbuilding", with "well-crafted characters" and "a clever story line packed with action and intrigue."

In Locus, Paul Di Filippo extolled its "infinite charm and variety" and its "vital, deftly limned characters" whose "natures are conveyed in colorful, sparkling dialogue", and noted that the depiction of full gender equality is "understated (...) but very effective and potent".

Cory Doctorow called it a work of "quiet — but stunning — erudition", in which "(e)very aspect of Ford's world – its politics, its history, its geography, its magic, its technology, its economics, its mythos – rings true", comparing the guest-house scene to "mainlining the entire Callahan's series along with every story of the Algonquin Roundtable", and the "haunting" nature of the novel's truncated ending to that of Mervyn Peake's unfinished Gormenghast novel.
