= How Much for Just the Planet? =

Novel by John M. Ford

- First edition cover
- Author: John M. Ford
- Language: English
- Series: Star Trek: TOS #36
- Genre: Science fiction
- Publisher: Pocket Books
- Publication date: October 1987
- Publication place: United States
- Media type: Print (Hardcover, Paperback)
- Pages: 251
- ISBN: 0-671-62998-0 (first edition, paperback)
- OCLC: 16851935
- Preceded by: The Romulan Way
- Followed by: Bloodthirst

How Much for Just the Planet? is a 1987 science fiction novel by American writer John M. Ford, part of the Star Trek franchise.

== Plot ==
In the novel, large deposits of dilithium are detected on a colony planet, and delegations are sent by the United Federation of Planets and the Klingon Empire to negotiate for mining rights (neither able to openly fight against the other because of the "Organian Lightbulbs", a reference to the Organians from the original series). They find the planet Direidi and its inhabitants to be very strange indeed. The planet's inhabitants occasionally break into song to explain their narratives or seemingly attack the visitors. Both crews (as well as the three-person crew of the Federation prospector that found the planet in the first place) get into various adventures with the planet's inhabitants and each other. In the end, it turns out that the inhabitants have set everything up according to "Plan C"—Comedy. All of the adventures the two crews encountered were designed to soften them up so that they wouldn't mine the whole planet, but would be willing to work with the inhabitants and each other.

== Klingons ==
The Klingons in this novel are based in the historical and cultural backstory created by Ford for his earlier novel The Final Reflection, which differs in many respects from the Klingon culture developed independently in later Star Trek television series. However, Ford uses elements from the Marc Okrand-developed Klingonese (which became the canonical Klingon language) mixed with Ford's own invented Klingonaase.

== U.S.S. Smith ==
The USS Jefferson Randolph Smith (NCC-29407), a prospector Sulek-class Federation starship, is under the command of Captain Tatyana Trofimov. John Ford named this ship after nineteenth century con artist and fraudster Jefferson Randolph Smith, alias Soapy Smith.

== Writers appearing as characters ==
A number of real-life people show up in the book as characters (tuckerizations).

- Princess DeeDee the First: Diane Duane
- Pete Blackwood: Peter Morwood
- Ilen the Magian: Neil Gaiman
- Pam: Pamela Dean
- Janeka: Janet Kagan
- Lieutenant "Ann" (walk-on, belowdecks): Ann Crispin
- The Stage Manager: John M. Ford

== Reception ==
J. Michael Caparula reviewed How Much for Just the Planet? in Space Gamer/Fantasy Gamer No. 84. Caparula commented that "The ending is all too predictable, but the reader is having too much fun by then to care. It's all light reading on the lighter side of Star Trek... which is perhaps the best side of all."

== Reviews ==
- Review by Don D'Ammassa (1988) in Science Fiction Chronicle, #101 February 1988
- Review by Ken Lake (1988) in Paperback Inferno, #75
- Review by Glen Engel-Cox (1998) in First Impressions, Installment Forty-One
- Review by Graham Sleight (2012) in Locus, #615 April 2012
