= Ghostbusters International =

Ghostbusters International is a 1989 role-playing game supplement published by West End Games for Ghostbusters.

== Contents ==
Ghostbusters International is a supplement in which the original Ghostbusters role-playing game is expanded with material inspired by Ghostbusters II, adding more rules, equipment, and guidance for new players and gamemasters while keeping the system fast and accessible, and it includes a featured adventure titled "Dead Guys on Parade".

== Publication history ==
Ghostbusters International was written by Aaron Allston and Douglas Kaufman with Bill Slavicsek (based on Sandy Petersen and Lynn Willis with Greg Stafford) and published by West End Games in 1989 as a boxed set containing a 144-page book, a 16-page pamphlet, and dice.

Appelcline explained that by 1989, "Ghostbusters was looking somewhat better thanks to the release of its second edition, Ghostbusters International (1989). The line was heavily supported through 1990 with almost a half-dozen products - as West End tried to get in on the marketing for the Ghostbusters II (1989) movie - but afterward the license expired and West End declined to renew it."

== Reception ==
Ken Cliffe reviewed Ghostbusters International in White Wolf #18 (Nov./Dec., 1989), rating it a 3 out of 5 and stated that "It's roleplaying, manic and plain silly fun. Is GBI worth buying? Yes, but only if you don't already have the original game. Those that do may find they've just bought something they already have."

Paul Mason reviewed Ghostbusters International for Games International magazine, and gave it 4 stars out of 5, and stated that "All in all, Ghostbusters GBI is still a good game. However, it's now trying to be a 'proper' game, with encumbrance rules and the like, and this sits uneasily with the wacky elements."

Jim Bambra reviewed the Ghostbusters International edition in the September 1990 edition of Dragon (Issue 161). Bambra commented that the new edition "retains the flavor of the original game." He also noted that there were many new rules, but "Whether those new rules are needed depends on your taste. I thought the [original] game worked fine as it was." He concluded "The new rules look like they'll work just fine, so if you've never experienced the thrill of getting 'slimed' or blasting away with a proton pack, here's your chance."

In his 1990 book The Complete Guide to Role-Playing Games, game critic Rick Swan reviewed Ghostbusters International. Swan was not sure if Ghosbusters International was an improvement on the original, pointing out that it "is more intimidating for novices ... and much less improvisational." He concluded by giving it the same 3 out of 4 rating as the original game, saying, "Since bigger isn't necessarily better, I'd pass on the new game if I were comfortable with the original."

Lawrence Schick in his book Heroic Worlds found the game "still pretty quick and simple" and most of the information for beginning players and gamemasters "quite well done", commenting that the included scenario "has to be good".

== Reviews ==
- Games Review (Volume 2, Issue 3 - Dec 1989)
- Polyhedron (Issue 49 - Vol. 9, No. 5)
- Knights of the Dinner Table Magazine (Issue 152 - Jun 2009)
- The Widow (February 1990). "Ghostbusters International". GamesMaster Magazine. 2 (6): 20. Review
