= John M. Ford =

American writer, game designer, and poet

John Milo Ford
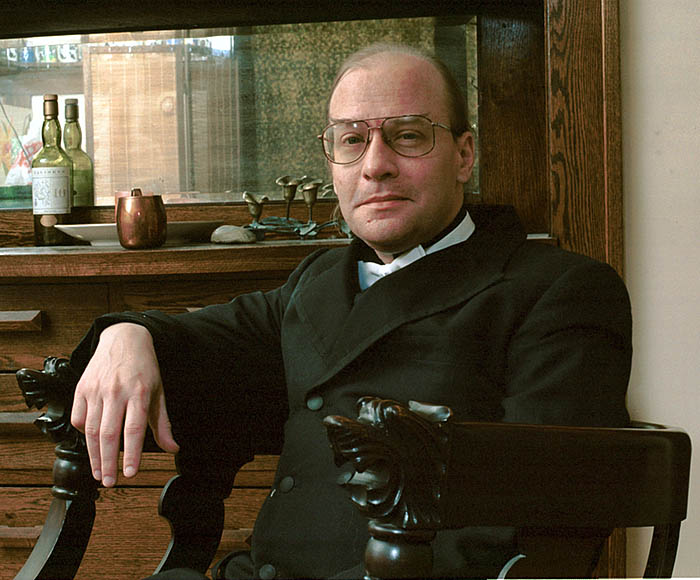
- Ford in 2000
- Born: April 10, 1957; East Chicago, Indiana, US
- Died: September 25, 2006 (aged 49); Minneapolis, Minnesota, US
- Occupations: Novelist; writer; game designer
- Partner: Elise Matthesen
- Writing career
- Genres: Science fiction, fantasy, cyberpunk

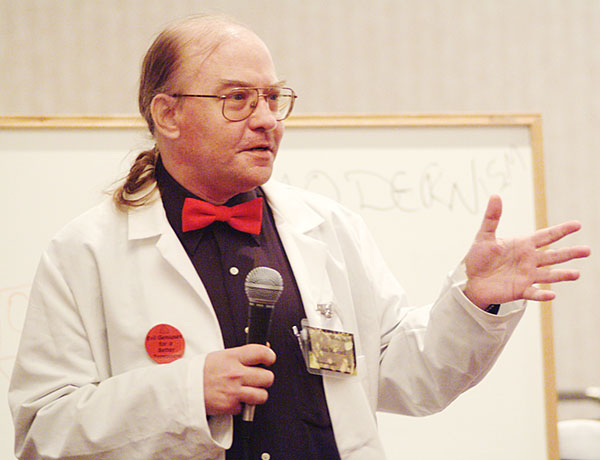
Ford at Minicon 38 in 2003

John Milo "Mike" Ford (April 10, 1957 – September 25, 2006) was an American science fiction and fantasy writer, game designer, and poet.

A contributor to several online discussions, Ford composed poems, often improvised, in both complicated forms and blank verse; he also wrote pastiches and parodies of many other authors and styles. At Minicon and other science fiction conventions he would perform "Ask Dr. Mike", giving humorous answers to scientific and other questions in a lab coat before a whiteboard.

== Life ==
Ford was born in East Chicago, Indiana, and raised in Whiting, Indiana. In the mid-1970s he attended Indiana University Bloomington, where he was active in the IU science fiction club and Society for Creative Anachronism (using the name Miles Atherton de Grey); while there, he published his first short story "This, Too, We Reconcile" in the May 1976 Analog.

Ford left IU and moved to New York to work on the newly founded Isaac Asimov's Science Fiction Magazine, where, starting in mid-1978, he published poetry, fiction, articles, and game reviews. Although his last non-fiction appeared there in September 1981, he was tenth most frequent contributor for the 1977–2002 period. About 1990, he moved to Minneapolis. In addition to writing, he worked at various times as a hospital orderly, computer consultant, slush pile reader, and copy editor.

Ford suffered from complications related to diabetes since childhood and also had renal dysfunction which required dialysis and, in 2000, a kidney transplant, which improved his quality of life considerably. He was found dead from natural causes in his Minneapolis home on September 25, 2006, by his partner since the mid-1990s, Elise Matthesen. He was a prominent member of the Friends of the Minneapolis Public Library, which established a John M. Ford Book Endowment after his death with the donations to be used as interest-generating capital for yearly purchase of new books.

== Work ==
Ford's works were varied in setting and style. Several were of the Bildungsroman (coming-of-age) type: in Web of Angels, The Final Reflection, Princes of the Air, Growing Up Weightless, and The Last Hot Time, Ford wrote variations on the theme of growing up, learning about one's world and one's place in it, and taking responsibility for it – which involves taking on the power and wisdom to influence events, to help make the world a better place.

Ford spent part of his career working in other people's universes. His 1983 book The Klingons for FASA's Star Trek: The Role Playing Game had an influence on subsequent productions from Paramount. He also wrote a comedic novel set in the Star Trek universe called How Much for Just the Planet?, where the Enterprise crew compete with a Klingon crew for control of a planet whose unhappy colonists defend their peace in inventive and farcical ways. The book includes song lyrics that satirize many 20th century stage musicals.

Ford authored the award-winning adventure The Yellow Clearance Black Box Blues (1985) for West End Games' Paranoia role-playing game.

Ford used a variety of styles to suit the world, characters, and situations he chose to write about. Author and critic John Clute wrote in the 1993 Encyclopedia of Science Fiction that "two decades into his career, there remains some sense that JMF remains unwilling or unable to create a definitive style or mode; but his originality is evident, a shifting feisty energy informs almost everything he writes, and that career is still young."

Ford was much respected by his fellow writers, editors, critics and fans. Robert Jordan, Ford's lifelong close friend, called Ford "the best writer in America – bar none." Neil Gaiman called Ford "my best critic ... the best writer I knew." Patrick Nielsen Hayden said, "Most normal people had the slight sense that something large and super-intelligent and trans-human had sort of flown over ... There would be a point where basically the plot would become so knotted and complex he would lose all of us."

After his death, almost all of Ford's work was out of print. The rights to his work had reverted to his legal heirs, but no one had managed to get in touch with them. After an investigation by a journalist, Isaac Butler, Ford's editors at Tor Books were able to reconnect with his family, and in November 2019 an agreement was reached to reissue all his published works, starting in 2020 with The Dragon Waiting.

== Bibliography ==
=== Fiction ===
==== Novels and novellas ====
- Web of Angels (1980, Pocket Books, ISBN 0-671-82947-5; 1992, Tor Books, ISBN 0-8125-0959-5), an early exploration of some topics that would later be described as cyberpunk
- The Princes of the Air (1982, Pocket Books, ISBN 0-671-44482-4; 1991, Tor Books, ISBN 0-8125-0958-7), a space opera
- The Dragon Waiting (1983, Timescape Books, ISBN 0-671-47552-5; 1985, Avon Books, ISBN 0-380-69887-0; 2002, Gollancz, ISBN 0-575-07378-0; 2020, Tor Books), a fantasy alternate history combining vampires, the Medicis, and the convoluted English politics surrounding Edward IV and Richard III; winner of the 1984 World Fantasy Award
- The Scholars of Night (1988, Tor Books, ISBN 0-312-93051-8; 1989, ISBN 0-8125-0214-0), a high tech Cold War thriller involving an undiscovered Christopher Marlowe play
- Fugue State (1990, Tor Books, ISBN 0-8125-0813-0), a longer version of the novella of the same name, published as Tor SF Double No. 25 with The Death of Doctor Island by Gene Wolfe
- Growing Up Weightless (1993, Spectra; 2022, Tor Books)
- The Last Hot Time (2000, Tor Books, ISBN 0-312-85545-1; 2001 paperback, ISBN 0-312-87578-9), urban fantasy set in a magical Chicago, Illinois.
- Aspects (2022, Tor Books, ISBN 9781250269034), An unfinished novel published posthumously.

==== Collections ====
- Casting Fortune (1989, Tor Books, ISBN 0-8125-3815-3). Stories set in the Liavek shared world, reprints "A Cup of Worrynot Tea" and "Green Is the Color" and original story "The Illusionist".
- From the End of the Twentieth Century (1997, NESFA Press, ISBN 0-915368-74-9, ISBN 0-915368-73-0), a collection of short stories, poetry, and essays
- Timesteps (1993, Rune Press). Poetry.
- Heat of Fusion and Other Stories (2004, Tor Books, ISBN 0-312-85546-X). Short stories and poetry. Finalist for the World Fantasy Award in 2005

==== Star Trek tie-in novels ====
- The Final Reflection (1984, Pocket Books, ISBN 0-671-47388-3; 1985, Ultramarine, ISBN 0-318-37547-8; 1985, Gregg Press, ISBN 0-8398-2885-3; 1991, Pocket Books, ISBN 0-671-74354-6), a Star Trek tie-in novel; (also 2004, Pocket Books, ISBN 0-7434-9659-0 [in omnibus Signature Edition, The Hand of Kahless])
- How Much for Just the Planet? (1987, Pocket Books, ISBN 0-671-62998-0; 1990, ISBN 0-671-72214-X; 1991, ISBN 0-671-03859-1), a Star Trek tie-in novel

==== Nonfiction ====
- On Writing Science Fiction: The Editors Strike Back!, with Darrell Schweitzer and George H. Scithers.(1981, Owlswick Press, ISBN 0-913896-19-5; Wildside Press 2000, ISBN 1-880448-78-5). A book on writing craft with examples provided by short fiction first sales to Isaac Asimov's Science Fiction Magazine.

=== Short works and poetry ===
- "A Cup of Worrynot Tea" in Liavek: The Players of Luck (1986, edited by Emma Bull and Will Shetterly)
- "Green Is the Color", "Eel Island Shoals" (song), "Pot-Boil Blues" (song) in Liavek: Wizard's Row (1987, edited by Emma Bull and Will Shetterly)
- "Winter Solstice, Camelot Station" (in Invitation to Camelot, edited by Parke Godwin)
- "Riding the Hammer" in Liavek: Spells of Binding (1988, edited by Emma Bull and Will Shetterly)
- "The Grand Festival: Sestina" (poem), "Divination Day: Invocation" (poem), "Birth Day: Sonnet" (poem), "Procession Day/Remembrance Night: Processional/Recessional" (poem), "Bazaar Day: Ballad" (poem), "Festival Day: Catechism" (poem), "Restoration Day: Plainsong" in Liavek: Festival Week (1990, edited by Emma Bull and Will Shetterly)
- "Scrabble with God", IASFM October 1985, reprinted in From the End of the Twentieth Century

=== Other work ===
- Ford published some children's fiction under pseudonyms he chose not to make public. He also authored two children's gamebooks under the house names. These are Star Trek: Voyage to Adventure, part of the Which Way Books series, as by "Michael J. Dodge" and the 1985 Blackstone's Magical Adventures: The Case of the Gentleman Ghost, tying in with the stage magician Harry Blackstone Jr. and published by Tor Books in 1985, which Ford authored under the name "Milo Dennison".
- Ford plotted three issues of the alternative history comic book Captain Confederacy in the late 1980s and wrote #10, "Driving North."
- Ford supplied cartography for a number of fantasy works by other authors, including The World of Robert Jordan's The Wheel of Time (2001, Tor Books, ISBN 0-312-86936-3), the latter at the behest of its author, a friend of Ford.

=== RPG and board games ===
- Work for Traveller.
- The Yellow Clearance Black Box Blues (1985, West End Games, ISBN 0-87431-027-X). An adventure for the Paranoia roleplaying game.
- The Sherwood Syndrome, part of the Star Trek III solitaire game set, with Greg Costikyan and Doug Kaufman (1985, West End Games).
- GURPS Time Travel with Steve Jackson (1991, Steve Jackson Games, ISBN 1-55634-115-6), a resource book for the GURPS roleplaying game.
- GURPS Y2K with Steve Jackson et al. (1999, Steve Jackson Games, ISBN 1-55634-406-6). A sourcebook.
- GURPS Traveller: Starports (2000, Steve Jackson Games, ISBN 1-55634-401-5), A sourcebook for GURPS Traveller roleplaying game.
- GURPS Infinite Worlds with Steve Jackson and Kenneth Hite (2005, Steve Jackson Games, ISBN 1-55634-734-0. A sourcebook.
- Scared Stiffs with Bill Slaviscek (1987, West End Games, ISBN 0874310628), an adventure for the Ghostbusters RPG.
- Ford wrote information concerning the Klingons FASA's Star Trek tabletop roleplaying game, and a number of RPG articles, which appeared in Autoduel Quarterly, Pyramid, Roleplayer, Space Gamer, and Journal of the Travellers' Aid Society.
- Klin zha, a chess-like game described in The Final Reflection, has been adopted by Klingon fandom.

== Awards ==
- 2005 Origins Award for Role-Playing Game Supplement of the Year – GURPS Infinite Worlds 4th Edition
- 1998 Minnesota Book Award for Fantasy & Science Fiction
- 1993 Philip K. Dick Award – Growing Up Weightless
- 1991 Origins Award for Best Roleplaying Supplement – GURPS Time Travel
- 1989 World Fantasy Award for Best Short Fiction – "Winter Solstice, Camelot Station" (in Invitation to Camelot, edited by Parke Godwin)
- 1989 Rhysling Award for Long Poem – also "Winter Solstice, Camelot Station"
- 1985 Origins Award for Best Roleplaying Supplement – The Yellow Clearance Black Box Blues
- 1984 World Fantasy Award for Best Novel – The Dragon Waiting

=== Nominations ===
- 2005 World Fantasy Award for Best Collection – Heat of Fusion and Other Stories
- 1996 Nebula Award for Best Novelette – "Erase/Record/Play" (in Starlight 1, edited by Patrick Nielsen Hayden)
- 1996 Theodore Sturgeon Award – also "Erase/Record/Play"
- 1995 Rhysling Award for Long Poems – "Troy: The Movie" (in Weird Tales, Spring 1994)
- 1991 Rhysling Award for Long Poems – "Bazaar Day: Ballad" (in Liavek: Festival Week, edited by Will Shetterly and Emma Bull) and "Cosmology: A User’s Manual" (in Isaac Asimov's Science Fiction Magazine, January 1990)
- 1990 Rhysling Award for Long Poems – "A Holiday in the Park" (in Weird Tales, Winter 1988/1989)
- 1987 Nebula Award for Best Novelette (final ballot) – "Fugue State" (in Under the Wheel, edited by Elizabeth Mitchell)
