= Empires in Arms =

1983 board game

The cover of the original AH Empires in Arms board game

Empires in Arms is an out-of-print board game by Harry Rowland, published by the Australian Design Group in 1983. It was licensed to the Avalon Hill Game Company (now a subsidiary of Hasbro Inc.) in 1985.

A computer version of the game was released by Matrix Games in late 2007.

== Gameplay ==
Empires in Arms is a "grand strategy" wargame, focusing on warfare in the Napoleonic era of 1805–1815. Up to seven players can participate, each assuming control of a Great Power (France, Great Britain, Russia, Austria, Prussia, Spain and Turkey). Variants have been developed that cover other time periods and allow for additional players by elevating a neutral country to a playable power.

Although classified as a war game, the object of the game is to achieve international prestige (measured by "victory points," as described below). Although successful military campaigns contribute to a player's prestige, there are other ways of gaining prestige, such as creating diplomatic alliances and improving the country's internal economy. A shrewd player can win the game without ever declaring war.

Victory is achieved by a given player when that player accrues a particular number of victory points. The number of victory points required is determined at the start of the game, when each player bids a certain number of victory points for each country. The player that bids the most for a given country plays that country. As a result, although not all seven countries are of equal strength, the weaker countries have a competitive advantage if the players bid a sufficiently low number of victory points for them.

Leader chits from each Great Power: Napoleon, Wellington, Charles, Kutusov, Pechlivan Khan, Castaños, and Brunswick. The numbers represent their strategic rating (ability to outflank/withdraw), their (head-to-head) tactical rating, and the number of corps they can manage. The letter indicates their order of precedence among fellow leaders.

Each power has a unique mix of economic and military power. Additionally the properties of the available forces and generals vary widely. Although Great Britain's regular infantry have high morale, France in general possesses the largest and highest-quality military.

The full game lasts 132 turns, one turn for each month, playing time can be 200–250 hours or more. Each month is split into four (sometimes five) phases:

- The Diplomatic phase where players negotiate deals, forge alliances etc.
- The Reinforcement phase where each player in sequence adds previously purchased reinforcements.
- The Naval phase where each player conducts naval moves in sequence.
- The Land phase where each player moves and fights with his armies in sequence.
- An Economic phase every three months, where players collect resources, purchase reinforcements, and earn victory points.

Winning the game is done through earning victory points. These are scored in the economic phase and are based on each nation's political status. The political status of a nation is influenced by a number of factors, but mainly by winning or losing wars and battles. Battles are won by a combination of generals available, the quality of the troops in the armies and a battlefield strategy selected prior to the battle. Troops are divided into elite guards, cavalry, infantry, artillery, militia and feudal troops.

Northwest portion of map (about 10% of total map size) showing early-game moves

The troops have different abilities but differ mainly in their morale. Most battles are won by reducing the opponents morale to zero rather than by destroying all factors in the army. With few exceptions, wars can only be won through a surrender and the appropriate time and conditions of a surrender is one of the key elements of the game.

== Reception ==
Empires in Arms was chosen for inclusion in the 2007 book Hobby Games: The 100 Best. Alessio Cavatore commented "Anyone who knows the game Empires in Arms (EiA) would agree that it is a monster. It is one of the longest, most complicated, and most demanding board games that has ever been produced. It's certainly the longest I've ever played, and I've played quite a few. However, EiA has also been the most exciting, engrossing, and rewarding board-gaming experience of my life."

Games included Empires in Arms in its top 100 games of 1986, calling it a "vivid game of the Napoleonic Wars. While land and sea conflicts are important, diplomacy and economic decisions play crucial roles too."

It was nominated for the Charles S. Roberts Award Best Professional Game of the Year at Origins '84.

== Video game ==
A video game adaptation for Windows titled, Empires in Arms: The Napoleonic Wars of 1805–1815, was released in 2007 by Matrix Games. Armchair General reviewed the game and called it "an easy recommendation for veterans of the boardgame and those who want to learn".
