= Kim Mohan =

American author, editor and game designer (1949–2022)

- Born: Kim Rudolph Mohan; May 4, 1949; Chicago, Illinois, U.S.
- Died: December 12, 2022 (aged 73)
- Occupations: Game designer, editor
- Writing career
- Period: 1979–2013
- Genre: Role-playing games
- Notable works: Dragon magazine, Wilderness Survival Guide

Kim Rudolph Mohan (May 4, 1949 – December 12, 2022) was an American author, editor and game designer best known for works related to the Dungeons & Dragons role-playing game.

== Early life and education ==
Mohan was born in Chicago, Illinois, on May 4, 1949. His family moved to Williams Bay, Wisconsin, when he was five. In high school, he became an avid science-fiction and fantasy reader, and also played wargames. He graduated third in his class and enrolled at Beloit College. However, he could not find a focus, switching majors several times from philosophy to mathematics and other subjects.

== Career ==
=== Reporter ===
Not finding what he needed at college, Mohan dropped out and decided to be a writer, finding a job as a reporter for the Lake Geneva Regional News. After a few months, he joined the staff of the Beloit Daily News. Over nine years, Mohan worked as everything from a sports writer, an editorial writer, the state editor, and the wire service editor. After nine years, he left the newspaper business to become a freelance writer for various newspapers.

=== TSR ===
In the summer of 1979, at the age of 30, Mohan went to the TSR Periodicals headquarters in Lake Geneva, Wisconsin. After completing an interview and some test freelance editing assignments, Mohan was hired by TSR as part of a three-man staff. Mohan was soon promoted to assistant editor of Dragon magazine, and became editor-in-chief with issue #49 (May 1981). Mohan also worked on other TSR projects: he was the co-designer of the TSR board game Food Fight, performed managerial duties for Strategy & Tactics and Amazing Stories magazine, served as editor and "general handyman" for the Unearthed Arcana rule book, authored the Wilderness Survival Guide rulebook, and edited Saga of Old City (Gary Gygax's first novel).

=== New Infinities Productions ===
In late 1985, Gary Gygax lost a boardroom struggle for control of TSR and left the company, forming rival company New Infinities Productions. Mohan and Frank Mentzer both left TSR to join Gygax at New Infinities. While there, Mohan was the author of the Cyborg Commando sequence of novels with Pamela O'Neill. Based on an outline by Gygax, the trilogy included Planet in Peril (1987), Chase into Space (1988) and The Ultimate Prize (1988). However, New Infinities was unable to procure enough outside investment to survive until their various projects came to market, and the company failed in 1989. Luke Gygax, son of Gary, later wrote, "[He] left TSR and went to work with my Dad because he believed in him and his capabilities. He did that at great risk to his family and it was a gamble that didn't pay off."

=== Return to TSR ===
Following the closure of New Infinities, Mohan returned to TSR and became editor of Amazing Stories (1992–2001), receiving several Locus Poll Award nominations for "Best Editor" and "Best Magazine or Fanzine". He also became editor of Dragon again from 1993 to 1995.

=== Wizards of the Coast ===
In 1996, TSR ran into financial difficulties, and was taken over by Wizards of the Coast (WotC) the following year. Mohan agreed to stay on, and became the lead editor of the 3rd edition of Dungeons & Dragons. He was then promoted to managing editor during the second half of the design stage (with Julia Martin finishing the project).

Mohan appeared in the 1999 History Channel special In Search of History: The Truth About Science Fiction, which featured Harlan Ellison and Larry Niven in a discussion about science fiction literature and movies.

== Later life and death ==
Mohan retired from WotC on May 31, 2013, aged 64. He continued to make contributions to material for both the 4th and 5th editions of D&D, becoming one of the few people to have writing or editing credits for all five editions. His final credit was as an editor for the 5th edition adventure Waterdeep: Dungeon of the Mad Mage in 2018.

Mohan died after suffering from lung problems, on December 12, 2022, at the age of 73.

== Writing credits ==
=== Role-playing games ===
- Wilderness Survival Guide (Advanced Dungeons & Dragons 1st Edition) (1986)
- Cyborg Commando (1987, with Gary Gygax and Frank Mentzer)
- Tobin's Spirit Guide (Ghostbusters RPG) (1989)

=== Board games ===
- Food Fight (1980)

=== Novels ===
- Planet in Peril (1987, with Pamela O'Neill) (Cyborg Commando trilogy)
- Chase Into Space (1988, with Pamela O'Neill) (Cyborg Commando trilogy)
- The Ultimate Prize (1988, with Pamela O'Neill) (Cyborg Commando trilogy)
- Four from Cormyr: 4 Forgotten Realms Adventures for Characters of Levels 9-12 (Adventure) (1997, with John Terra)

== Editor credits ==
- Dragon, 1984–1994
- Amazing Stories, 1991–1995, 1998–2000
- More Amazing Stories, 1998
- Sword and Fist: A Guidebook to Fighters and Monks, 2001, managing editor
- Psionics Handbook, 2001, managing editor
- Waterdeep: Dungeon of the Mad Mage, 2018, contributing editor
