= Star Trek III (board game) =

Board game

Star Trek III is a board game published by West End Games.

== Gameplay ==
Star Trek III is package which contains three separate solo games: The Kobayashi Maru, Free Enterprise, and The Sherwood Syndrome.

== Reception ==
J. Michael Caparula reviewed Star Trek III in Space Gamer/Fantasy Gamer No. 79. Caparula commented that "I suppose finding that winning formula is what makes this package so attractive. [...] This is a terrific value."

== Reviews ==
- 1986 Games 100
- Analog Science Fiction and Fact
