= Ghostbusters (role-playing game) =

Tabletop comedy role-playing game

A Frightfully Cheerful Roleplaying Game
- First edition cover
- Designers: Sandy Petersen; Lynn Willis; Greg Stafford
- Publishers: West End Games
- Publication: 1986 (Ghostbusters); 1989 (Ghostbusters International)
- Genres: Comedy
- Systems: D6 System
- ISBN: 0874310431
- System became the signature mechanic of the D6 System

Ghostbusters, subtitled "A Frightfully Cheerful Roleplaying Game", is a comedy role-playing game published by West End Games (WEG) in 1986 that is based on the 1984 film Ghostbusters.

== Setting ==
The Ghostbusters role-playing game is set in the same fictional universe as the Ghostbusters films, but in a period sometime after the first film. In the game, the original Ghostbusters have created a corporation known as Ghostbusters International, which sells Ghostbusters franchises to individuals around the world.

Most player characters in the Ghostbusters role-playing game are franchisees who operate in cities outside the film's New York locale. The game does, however, include profiles of the original four Ghostbusters for gamers who wish to role-play the cinematic characters or have them appear as non-player characters.

While the Ghostbusters films limit the Ghostbusters to combating ectoplasmic entities such as ghosts and demons, the Ghostbusters game expands the setting to pit Ghostbusters against numerous other paranormal creatures and incidents. Ghostbusters characters may encounter creatures as diverse as vampires, extraterrestrials, and time-travelers.

== System ==
Ghostbusters features an intentionally minimalist rules system. The game's main rulebook, the Operations Manual, does not include rules for subjects like movement rates and weapon ranges; it explicitly states that they are unnecessary for play.

Character generation in Ghostbusters begins with a simple character point mechanic for assigning character attributes, which it calls Traits. Each character begins with 12 points, which the character's player assigns to the four Traits: Brains, Muscle, Moves, and Cool, giving each Trait a score between 1 and 5.

Each character must also be assigned four Talents. Talents (skills) are organized into groups based on which of the four Traits they're most associated with; each character has one Talent from each group. The character's score in each Talent is three points higher than the associated Trait. For example, one might have a Cool of four with Convince as his talent, making his dice pool on Convince rolls seven.

In some cases, certain equipment or circumstances might add additional dice to the pool. For example, one could have a Muscles of two with Brawl as his talent, for a dice pool of five. This could be further improved by picking up a wrench to use as a club in melee combat for two more dice, for a total dice pool of seven.

Most tasks in Ghostbusters are resolved by determining which Trait or (if appropriate) Talent is most relevant to the task at hand, and rolling a number of six-sided dice equal to that Trait or Talent's score. The results of the dice rolled are added, and the sum compared to a difficulty number assigned to the task by the Ghostmaster (gamemaster). If the player's roll equals or exceeds the difficulty number, the character succeeds at the task.

This basic dice pool mechanic has two additional game mechanics. The first, the Ghost Die, is a special die that represents bad luck, and can cause even successful actions to have negative effects for player characters. It has the Ghostbusters logo instead of a six, and when it comes up causes some unfortunate mishap. When a ghost is rolled for a villain, the mishaps rebound in their favor or temporarily make their powers more effective.

The second mechanic, Brownie Points, represent the character's accumulated "good karma", and can be used to increase the number of dice used in a task resolution roll, or even change the effects of a roll that would have otherwise failed. The points must be spent before rolling, however-one may not spend brownie points to obtain additional dice to roll once a roll has already failed. Each character begins the game with a pool of 20 Brownie Points, which decreases as they are used in play. In the first edition Brownie Points are also lost when characters are injured. Players earn replacement points for their characters by succeeding in Ghostmaster-appointed tasks, achieving their character's personal goal (for instance, Egon's is "Advancing the Cause of Science"), and as rewards for good roleplaying.

The task resolution system in Ghostbusters was influential on the development of other West End Games systems. A more detailed version of the system was used in Star Wars: The Roleplaying Game, and became the signature mechanic of the D6 System. As the first known "dice pool" system it had an influence on other role-playing games, too: after producing Ars Magica, Jonathan Tweet and Mark Rein-Hagen were inspired by Ghostbusters to each design their own game based on "dice pool" resolution mechanics. Tweet produced the cult hit Over the Edge, while Rein-Hagen came up with Vampire: The Masquerade, the system of which would go on to drive the World of Darkness roleplaying games as well as Exalted and many other White Wolf Publishing games.

== History ==
=== First Edition ===
The original Ghostbusters: A Frightfully Cheerful Roleplaying Game boxed set (ISBN 0-87431-043-1) was designed by Sandy Petersen, Lynn Willis and Greg Stafford and published by WEG in 1986. It contains a 24-page Training Manual for the players, a 64-page Operations Manual for the gamemaster, six six-sided dice (5 regular and 1 Ghost Die), and various handouts. WEG published three accessories for the original Ghostbusters rules:

- Hot Rods of the Gods adventure module by Daniel Greenburg. (ISBN 0-87431-052-0)
- Scared Stiffs adventure module by John M. Ford and Bill Slavicsek. (ISBN 0-87431-062-8)
- Ghost Toasties adventure module (with included "Ghostmaster's Screen") by Scott Haring. (ISBN 0-87406-137-7)

=== Second Edition ===
In 1989, WEG published a second, revised version of Ghostbusters, titled Ghostbusters International (ISBN 0-87431-223-X). The second version of the game was published both to capitalize on that year's release of the film Ghostbusters II, and to satisfy players who requested a more detailed set of rules. This boxed set contains a single, 144-page rule book, six six-sided dice (5 regular and 1 Ghost Die), and handouts. WEG published five accessories for the Ghostbusters International rules:

- ApoKERMIS Now! adventure module by Bill Slavicsek and Paul Balsamo. (ISBN 0-87431-201-9)
- Ghostbusters II: The Adventure adventure module (with included updated "Ghostmaster's Screen") by C.J. Tramontana. (ISBN 0-87431-204-3)
- Lurid Tales of DOOM! adventure module by Jonatha Ariadne Caspian. (ISBN 0874312035)
- Pumpkin Patch Panic adventure module by Grant Boucher. (ISBN 0-87431-202-7)
- Tobin's Spirit Guide reference supplement by Kim Mohan (ISBN 0-87431-259-0)

Ghostbusters and all of its supplements are currently out of print.

== Reception ==
In the July 1986 edition of White Dwarf (Issue #79), Marcus Rowland liked the game's humorous approach, as well as the lightweight rules and easy character generation. However, he questioned the relatively high cost of the game compared to the other less expensive light-hearted RPGs already on the market, Toon and Paranoia, saying, "It remains to be seen if the cost of this game will be justified by the quality of future scenarios; with the exception of the film tie-in, the system offers few advantages over Paranoia and Toon, and will be a good deal more expensive."

In the February–March 1987 edition of Space Gamer/Fantasy Gamer (Issue No. 77), Terry Paul commented that "Ghostbusters, the Roleplaying Game is an all round quality product which is fun to read and even more fun to play and it is indeed well worth the price of purchase."

In Issue 37 of the French games magazine Casus Belli, Frédéric Blayo and Pierre Lejoyeu noted the simplicity of the game mechanics, writing, "It is designed for games of 1 to 3 hours, the rules are very simple, which allows novices to discover role-playing gently and beginners to take a break from the games they usually play." They concluded, "Although very simple, the game is very funny as long as you get in the mood. It is not repetitive and allows for many short but intense games."

Jim Bambra reviewed both the original Ghostbusters. In the April 1987 edition of Dragon (Issue 132), he called Ghostbusters "a fast-action game that encourages good role-playing and the destruction of large chunks of real estate with proton packs." Bambra also admired the production values, saying, "With its high-quality components and breezy writing style, the Ghostbusters game is very accessible." He liked the light-weight rules and the emphasis on having fun, concluding, "Fast, dramatic fun that drips slime at every turn helps the Ghostbusters game take the humor of the movie to new heights [offering] a neat, simple design which provides hours of cheerful fun."

In Issue 7 of The Games Machine, John Woods liked the high quality of the components, and the light-hearted humor of the rules, which he still found "simple in the extreme but have a number of really nice touches." He called it "a fast-paced game that is easy to learn but provides plenty of scope for hilarious action," and concluded, "If you fancy a spot of light-hearted modern-day roleplaying and laughed more than twice at the movie, you'll love this."

In his 1990 book The Complete Guide to Role-Playing Games, game critic Rick Swan reviewed both Ghostbusters. He called it "an oddball of a game, but it's an appealing oddball for a couple of reasons. First, it can be learned in half an hour ... Second, like the 1984 blockbuster movie of the same name, it's irresistibly silly." Swan gave the game a rating of 3 out of 4, warning, "Those will a low tolerance for corny humor will have problems with Ghostbusters. Even for young players, the game works best in small doses, as it lacks the depth to sustain a lot of replay."

In a retrospective review in the March 1996 edition of Arcane, James Wallis asked "Is Ghostbusters really a classic? Members of the jury, consider this: its open-system has influenced game designs ever since, including Star Wars, Shadowrun and White Wolf's diametrically opposed World of Darkness series. All this, and it's still the only RPG in which you can snog Sigourney Weaver." Later that year, in a reader poll conducted by Arcane to determine the 50 most popular roleplaying games of all time, Ghostbusters was ranked 37th. Magazine editor Paul Pettengale commented: "Ghostbusters sports a wacky collection of stats, a wild way of handling skills and combat, and instead of experience you earn Brownie Points. Really rather clever."

In 1999, Pyramid magazine named Ghostbusters as one of The Millennium's Most Underrated Games. Editor Scott Haring noted that Ghostbusters was "the first-ever RPG to use the dice pool mechanic" and "the game did a great job of catching the zany feel of the movies."

In his 2023 book Monsters, Aliens, and Holes in the Ground, RPG historian Stu Horvath noted, "The game does a good job of channeling the source material. It's funny, and the humor works on many levels ... While much of the game feels like it's meant to be taken as a slapstick version of Call of Cthulhu, it is, in many ways, (like the original film) a zany small business comedy." Horvath also quotes WEG game designer Bill Slavicsek that this game's success "led [West End Games] to pivot from a board game company to an RPG company."

== Awards and other recognition ==
At the 1987 Origins Awards, Ghostbusters won the H.G. Wells Award for Best Roleplaying Rules of 1986.

Ghostbusters was included in the 2007 book Hobby Games: The 100 Best. James Wallis commented: "Ghostbusters: A Frightfully Cheerful Roleplaying Game remains a unique and audacious oddity, the brilliant forerunner of an entire genre that should have been and never was."

== See also ==
- InSpectres
