= The Yellow Clearance Black Box Blues =

Role-playing game supplement

The Yellow Clearance Black Box Blues was one of the first true missions for the Paranoia role-playing game. It was written by John M. Ford and won the H. G. Wells Award for Best Role-Playing Adventure of 1985.

== Plot summary ==
The Yellow Clearance Black Box Blues is a four-part scenario in which the troubleshooters repeatedly try to get hold of a mysterious black box. Their quest pits them against the various secret societies of Alpha Complex (including the Death Leopards and the Sierra Club) and eventually leads them to the Outside and an ancient rock 'n' roll cult.

The Yellow Clearance Black Box Blues consists of 4 sub-missions that aren't related at all, save for the constant appearance of a mysterious Black Box. Each of the PC Troubleshooters have orders to capture the box for their secret society. Unfortunately, everyone else they meet has the same orders. This leads to a constant, massive brawl for the box, despite no one really knowing what is inside.

== Legacy ==
Several concepts in this adventure have become Paranoia staples:

- Everyone (not just the PCs) vying for a single MacGuffin, often leading to...
- Massive firefights with a half-dozen or more groups battling it out (with the PCs caught in the crossfire).
- Situations of pure madness in which the PCs can either flail about helplessly or sit back and try to survive. (In this case, the Dance Routine From Hell.)
- A series of escalating gags at the briefings.
- Seemingly fatal events that the PCs can survive, provided they don't do anything (like try to survive).
- Two endings, a semi-serious one and a bring-the-house-down one. (Literally; Alpha Complex doesn't survive the latter.)

== Publication history ==
The Yellow Clearance Black Box Blues was written by John M. Ford, with art by Jim Holloway, and was first published by West End Games in 1985 as a 48-page book with an outer folder.

The Yellow Clearance Black Box Blues was one of the early supplements for Paranoia, along with Warren Spector and Allen Varney's Send in the Clones (1985).

== Reception ==
Marcus L. Rowland reviewed The Yellow Clearance Black Box Blues for White Dwarf #77, giving it an overall rating of 7 out of 10, and stated that "John M Ford, the author of this adventure, should be justifiably proud. It's a must for any Paranoia referee."

The Yellow Clearance Black Box Blues won the H.G. Wells Award for Best Role-playing Adventure of 1985.

An article in Locus Magazine from 2012 by Graham Sleight also mentions it as "surely the funniest RPG scenario ever."

== Reviews ==
- Casus Belli (Issue 32 - Apr 1986)
- Jeux et Stratégie #48 (as "Blues en Jaune pour une Boîte Noire")
