= Australian Design Group =

The Australian Design Group is a game company that specializes in wargames and strategic board games.

== History ==
The Australian Design Group was formed in 1982 by a group of Canberra gaming enthusiasts in order to publish the game Empires in Arms. The game was designed by Harry Rowland, who was thirteen years old at the time. Empires in Arms was published in 1983 and proved to be an almost instant success, receiving a nomination for Game of the Year at Origins in 1984. The game was licensed to the Avalon Hill Game Company in 1985, and still sells strongly.

The Australian Design Group went on to produce the international smash hit World in Flames, a popular game based on the Second World War, which won the Game of the Year, State of the Art, Best 20th Century Game and Game of the Decade awards.

Since then, the Australian Design Group has produced Days of Decision, Rub Out, World Cup Football, America in Flames, Patton in Flames, 7 Ages and numerous World in Flames kits.
