= World in Flames =

1985 board wargame designed by Harry Rowland

- World In Flames - 4th edition
- Designers: Harry Rowland
- Publishers: Australian Design Group (ADG)
- Players: 2-6
- Setup time: 30-120 minutes, depending on campaign
- Playing time: 20-180 hours, depending on campaign and rules version
- Chance: Low, Dice
- Skills: Strategy, tactics, resource management

World in Flames is a grand strategy game on the Second World War which was first released in 1985 by the Australian Design Group, and currently holds the title of the world's largest commercially available board game. It was designed by Harry Rowland and is currently in its eighth edition, World in Flames - Collector's Edition. Each new edition features changes to the rules, maps and counters.

The game is a strategic-level recreation of both the European and Pacific theatres of World War II. The grand campaign begins with the German invasion of Poland, although several other scenarios are included. The game contains rules determining when the Soviet Union, United States, and Italy may choose to enter the conflict.

== Game mechanics ==
World in Flames game mechanics take into account many aspects of the World War II conflict. There are three main combat types; land combat, air combat and naval combat. The game is designed in such a way that these different combat types may influence each other. Thus, it is possible that a battle may consist of a number of engagements involving air, land and naval units, even if it is taking place in the land combat phase of an impulse. The rules are designed to be able to cope with different types of activity without invoking new concepts for each situation. For example, strategic bombing of factories and resources is handled by the same rules that handle tactical bombing, paradrops and naval bombing. Attacks on convoys are handled by the same rules that handle ship-to-ship and air-to-ship warfare.

== Major Powers and sides ==
The game is played with the Commonwealth (consisting of the United Kingdom, Canada, India, Australia, South Africa and numerous territories and colonies), France, China, USSR and the United States of America forming the Allies and Germany, Italy and Japan forming the Axis. China is divided into Chinese Nationalists and Chinese Communists. Each major power can be played by one player; in practice two or more major powers on the same side are usually played by each player. If there is more than one player on the Allied side, the Chinese communists are controlled by the USSR player.

== Major Power neutrality and entry into the war ==
At the beginning of the game, Germany must declare war on Poland. France and the British Commonwealth must subsequently declare war on Germany on their next move. At this time, Japan is at war with China. All other Major Powers are neutral. Future declarations of war between the Major Powers influences US Entry and US Tension, which are abstractions of when United States of America can declare war. Generally, more aggressive and successful play from the Axis side will hasten the entry of the US into the war. Aggressive Allied play - such as declaration of war on neutral minor countries - will slow US entry.

However, these required political actions can be quite different if you play with Days of Decision, as an expansion to this game. Days of Decision starts gameplay in 1936 and allows for a far greater range of actions in the political spectrum.

== Production and industrial output ==
The ability of a Major Power to produce military units is abstracted by three factors. Production points from on-map factory complexes are combined with resource points from on-map natural resources. For each pair of points successfully combined (by railing or shipping a resource-point to a factory), the nation gains a number of build points equal to its production multiplier. This multiplier represents how well geared the nation's industry is towards war-time production. As the war proceeds, all production-multipliers go up. The build points can be spent to purchase units for land, sea and air warfare.

== Turn length, initiative and impulses ==
The side with the higher initiative roll decides which side will have the first of several moves in a turn. The roll is modified for one of the sides by a +1 or +2 on a ten-sided die, reflecting the side's ability to execute quick and well-coordinated offensives with enough resources. The initiative modifier shifts if one side asks for a reroll or if one side has the first and the last move in one turn. After initiative is determined, the winner chooses an impulse type (see below) and moves their units, and resolves different types of combat according to rules. After the impulse is ended, the impulse marker is advanced on a track with a number determining how likely the entire turn is to end. A die is rolled to see if this is the end of the turn; if not, the other side takes their impulse. The process is repeated until the end of turn die-roll indicates the end of the turn.

== Weather ==
Weather is determined at the start of the initiative winner's impulse using the Weather Chart, which is a function of the time of year and a die roll. The map is divided into six different weather zones, and each zone is assigned its own weather based on the Weather Chart result. The weather influences combat modifiers, naval ability to spot enemy fleets, supply range, aircraft mission eligibility, land unit movement allowance and how fast the end of turn impulse marker advances after each impulse. Weather greatly influences turn length and what can be accomplished in terms of offensives.

== Supply ==
Supply is an important "World in Flames" concept. Each unit must be able to trace a line to a primary supply source, which is any friendly-controlled city in its home country or a cooperating Major Power, or to a secondary supply source which is itself in supply. The line cannot pass through an enemy-controlled hex, or the hex next to an enemy corps (which exerts a Zone of Control) unless this is occupied by a friendly land unit. (Each hex is controlled by whichever side passed a land unit into or through it most recently.) This line can only be four hexes long on the European map or two on the Asian/Pacific map, and is further restricted in bad weather or desert, but it may cross any number of sea zones free of uncontested enemy naval units or naval bombing factors. A supply path may only have one seaborne section, which must always pass from the source through a port, and through another port at the receiving end unless the unit is on a seacoast.

A secondary supply source is any headquarters unit or capital of a country controlled by the same Major Power as the unit, or any headquarters unit or capital of a conquered country controlled by a cooperating Major Power. The supply requirements for secondary supply sources are the same as for regular units, except that the path from a secondary to a primary supply source may be extended by any length of railroad (which is a permanent feature of the map) subject to the same enemy interference as the other hexes on the path.

An out-of-supply unit cannot attack and cannot move without being flipped over or "disrupted". A disrupted, out of supply unit is very easy to destroy.

== Impulse type ==
At the start of each Major Power move, the controlling player must choose an impulse type. This represents that Major Power's current allocation of resources and planning. The possible choices are: Land impulse, Naval impulse, Air impulse, Combined impulse, and Pass impulse. Choosing a Land impulse will allow the player to move any number of land units, some air units and no naval units. Correspondingly, a Naval impulse will allow the movement of any number of naval units, some air units and no land units. The Air impulse allows the movement of any number of air units, but no other moves. A Combined impulse allows a limited number of land, air and naval movements, and restricts the number of land attacks that can be performed. The exact number of movements allowed depends on the Major Power and reflects its overall size and organisation. Larger and more powerful Major Powers like the US have more moves available in each category then, for instance, Italy. The Pass impulse allows no moves or attacks. If two or more Major Powers choose this option, the chance for ending the turn increases.

== Land combat ==
Land combats are resolved by determining odds. Odds are determined by comparing combat factors on the attacking and defending side. Combat factors are influenced by unit strength and supply situation, terrain, tactical bombing factors, shore bombardment from naval units, and artillery. After the odds are determined as the ratio of attacking versus defending combat factors, a die roll is performed adding combat modifiers from unit disruption, weather conditions and other factors. The resulting modified die-roll is cross-referenced on the appropriate odds column of the combat result table. This table gives losses for the attacker and defender and provides information about whether the attacking units are disrupted, if a breakthrough is achieved, if the defender has to retreat, and other results.

== Air combat ==
Air combats are fought between fighter units from each side or between fighter units and other units, like strategic, naval or tactical bombers. The non-fighter unit types are generally easily destroyed in air-to-air combat, and air-combats are usually fought to hinder the opposing player's non-fighter aircraft in performing a bombing, resupply or paradrop mission. Each side divides its aircraft units into fighters and either bombers or air transports, in two sequences of units numbered from first to last. The first unit is called the "front fighter" or "front bomber".

Each air unit has an air-to-air combat factor. The air-to-air combat strength of each side is the strength of its front fighter, which can be increased by having other fighters behind it. A side with no fighters uses the unmodified air-to-air combat strength of its front bomber; also, all remaining non-fighters belonging to the other side are "cleared through" to their targets, that is, are able to reach their targets unhindered.

A round of air-to-air combat consists of both sides determining odds by subtracting the opposing side's modified air-to-air combat factor from their own value and summing the rolls of two ten-sided dice. The appropriate odds-column in the air-combat results table is consulted and results implemented. Results include the "clearing through" of enemy aircraft, aborting enemy front fighters or bombers (which are then forced to land on eligible hexes and turn face down), and destroying enemy front fighters or bombers. At the beginning of each round of air-to-air combat, each side can opt to abort its remaining aircraft and return them to an eligible hex.

== Naval combat ==
To initiate combat, two fleets in the same sea area either commit or submerge their submarines, then perform die rolls to determine whether the units (which can also include land-based and carrier-based aircraft) spot each other, which side has the element of surprise and to what degree. The way that surprise points are spent can have a decisive impact on the course of events. If at least one stack of units is deemed to spot the enemy fleet and neither side uses surprise to evade the other, combat is initiated.

There are three types of naval combat: naval air combat (one or both sides attacking the other side's ships and aircraft using fighters and naval bombers), submarine combat (submarines attacking convoys and being attacked by anti-submarine warfare (ASW)) and surface combat (ships and submarines attacking each other directly). The right to select the combat type is conferred firstly by surprise, secondly by aircraft, and thirdly by submarines facing enemy convoys. If these conditions are either not present or not invoked by either side, a surface combat will be fought.

Naval air combat requires that an air-to-air battle is fought if either player has fighters allocated to defending their units. Any bombers cleared through are then subject to anti-aircraft fire from the defending ships. Surviving naval bombing factors are then used to determine what damage is inflicted on the enemy fleet. Surface or submarine combat is decided by adding the combat factors of all involved ships or subs on each side. ASW is provided by surface warships (each of which is assumed to always have a screen of destroyers), by naval bombing factors or, in the late war, by Western Allied convoys. The sum of the relevant type of combat factors is cross referenced with the number of units in the opposing fleet to determine results. Surprise can at this point be used to increase the amount of damage inflicted, to decrease the amount of damage sustained and/or to choose a specific target -- carriers and loaded troop ships being popular choices. In naval air combat, the first and subsequent odd-numbered targets are selected by the owner of the attacking bombers.

Inflicted damage takes the form of one or more instances of units immediately "aborted" to a friendly port, "damaged" or "destroyed". Each result must be assigned to a unit, which then makes a roll to determine if its armour reduces the damage by one level. A ship can be chosen to suffer more than one hit, but two "damage" results will destroy it. As can be expected, battleships are more likely to reduce damage successfully than more lightly armoured units.

After all results are assigned, each side has the option of aborting all remaining ships in the combat, returning them to an eligible port and flipping them. If neither side aborts, they roll again to spot each other and combat can occur again. Any round in which there is no hostile contact ends the naval combat phase for that sea zone.

== Reception ==
In the November 1989 edition of Games International (Issue 10), Mike Siggins greatly admired the production values, saying, "The box [...] contains 1000 counters, maps and play aids and these are all among the best you will see in the hobby." Although he found the rules long and complex, he admitted that they "make an acceptable job of conveying the system to the reader, and their length is partly due to the copious examples, which is no bad thing". He pointed out that this is a monster game that would take large amounts of time, saying, "my estimate is that at least twenty hours once you know the system". He concluded by giving the game an above-average rating of four out of five, commenting, "World in Flames won't be everybody's cup of tea [...] but if you're a fan of strategic Second World War games and want the whole works, this is undoubtedly the one to buy".

== Editions and Expansions ==
- Classic Editions: 1st-5th
- Final Edition: 6th-7th
- Collector's Edition: 8th
- Patton in Flames, a game postulating a WWIII between the Western Allies and Communist Powers.
- America in Flames, a game postulating an Axis victory and subsequent invasion of the United States in 1944.
- Days of Decision, a game that covers the diplomacy of the years 1936-1946. It can be played with both World in Flames and stand-alone.
- Territories in Flames, an expansion for WiF 8 that includes colonial, volunteer, and infrastructure units, as well as others.
- Divisions in Flames, an expansion for WiF 8 that includes artillery, divisions, special forces, and Guard Banner Armies, as well as others.
- Ships in Flames 1995, later 1997, an expansion for WiF 5-6 that includes additional naval units, such as cruisers and additional units to represent the submarine war, as well as a "Task Force Display" that introduces an element of the fog of war to the game. Later version were released specifically for the 7th and 8th editions of World in Flames.
- Planes in Flames 1993, later Gold 1996, 2000, and finally 2017, an expansion for WiF 5-8 that introduces a plethora of pre-war and post-war planes, as well as the Atomic Bomb.
- Africa in Flames 1993, later Gold 1994, an expansion for WiF 5-7, that included a map of Africa and many of the components of Territories in Flames.
- Asia in Flames 1993, later Gold 1994 an expansion for WiF 5-7, originally included a map of Southeast Asia, but was subsequently released with a map of Scandinavia when the WiF map was expanded for the 6th edition. It included many of the components for Divisions in Flames.
- Mech in Flames 1995, later 2007, an expansion for WiF 5-7, introduced Mechanized and Motorized Infantry to the game. These units are now fully incorporated in the WiF 8 base game.
- Convoys in Flames, an expansion for WiF 7, included units to add more realism and complexity to the submarine war. It is now incorporated in WiF 8 Ships in Flames.
- Cruisers in Flames, an expansion for WiF 7, expanded the WiF fleet to now include every warship to participate in WWII from Battleships to Light Cruisers, as well as hypothetical units. It is now incorporated in WiF 8 Ships in Flames.
- Leaders in Flames 1998, an expansion for WiF 5-7, was part of the 1997-98 annual, bearing the same name. It included military leader units for WiF, as well as Russian Guard Banner Armies and late war units for various countries. The Guard Banner Army units are now included in Divisions in Flames, and the late-war units are now included in the WiF 8 base game.
- Politics in Flames, an expansion for WiF 7-8, was part of the millennium annual, bearing the same name. It included a political system for WiF, less complex than Days of Decision, but more flexible than the standard system. Heavy weapons units for China and the USSR (the two countries that did not receive additional units from America in Flames, published in 1999), additional SS foreign volunteers (now included in Territories in Flames), and several other pieces were included.
- Factories in Flames, an expansion for WiF 7-8, was part of the 2008 annual, bearing the same name. It included a more complex economic system for WiF, additional political options for Days of Decision, and special forces units (now included in Divisions in Flames).

== Largest Board Game ==
Harry Rowland explained what a great achievement receiving the world record was, “World in Flames: the Collector’s edition was released in 2018 as a hard-mounted board game unlike previous versions which, like most games in this genre, use paper maps. It has four 850mm x 574mm hard-mounted maps and three 420mm x 297mm hard-mounted mini-maps and displays, totaling 2.3279 sqm. It also includes, in the Deluxe version, 4900 counters and 192 pages of rules, 22 campaigns, and players’ & designer’s notes, that makes World in Flames a hobby in a box.”

“World in Flames: the Collector’s Edition is the culmination of millions of hours testing the game to its limits by tens of thousands of gamers over the years; we couldn’t have done it without their help. The award is as much a tribute to our players’ enthusiasm, comments and suggestions as it is to the printers and company, many people deserve this award and I thank you all."

“The international nature of modern gaming is clearly displayed in this project with artists contributing from Mexico, the USA, Germany, Czechia and Australia; rules, testing and editing from around the world, and design in Mapleton."

“We are also very pleased with the outstanding efforts of our printing partners, EFKO, based in Prague. They are one of the few companies in the world that could take on a project as massive as this, particularly in the creation of the hard-mounted maps which have immense technical difficulties making terrain features align exactly across the map joins. EFKO have given World in Flames: the Collector’s Edition the lavish attention this game deserves to make this award possible.”

EFKO owner, Mirek Kotik, said that his company was proud to have taken part in the project to make history with this world record, “It is a deserved recognition of our team’s professional approach to printing the most complex projects in a time critical manner, paying attention to the smallest detail in every game we produce.”

== Awards ==
At the 1986 Origins Awards, World in Flames won the 1985 Charles S. Roberts Award for Best 20th Century Game.

== Computer Game ==
Matrix Games World in Flames
- Designers: Steven Hokanson, Chris Marinacci
- Publishers: Matrix Games
- Players: 1-6
- Setup time: 30-120 minutes, depending on campaign
- Playing time: 20-180 hours, depending on campaign and optional rules
- Chance: Low, RNG
- Skills: Strategy, tactics, resource management

A computerised version of World in Flames had been under development for decades. The initial version, known as CWiF (Computer World in Flames), was programmed by Chris Marinacci in the 1990s with poor graphics and no AI, and until 2002 this version was downloadable at little or no cost from various websites. In 2005 Matrix Game acquired a licence from the game owners to develop a new computerised version known as MWiF (Matrix World in Flames) designed around version seven of the WiF rules. This product was programmed by Steven Hokanson, and released in 2013 with three high quality hardbound game manuals but no AI, although AI as well as a PBEM (play by e-mail mode) are planned.

A support pack of physical maps showing the gameboard is also available for purchase.
