= Ghost Toasties =

Tabletop comedy role-playing game supplement

- Designers: Scott Haring
- Publishers: West End Games
- Publication: 1986; 40 years ago
- Genres: Comedy
- Systems: D6 System
- ISBN: 0-87406-137-7

Ghost Toasties is an adventure published by West End Games in 1986 for the light-hearted role-playing game Ghostbusters, itself based on the movie Ghostbusters.

== Plot summary ==
Ghost Toasties is an adventure in which the deity Hagost seeks a crystal holding his life-force that became hidden in a breakfast cereal package. The player characters must enter Hagost's pocket universe, overcome guardians that resemble popular cartoon animals of the time before confronting Hagost. The overall scenario is broken down into six mini- adventures; in each, the player characters deal with a different phenomenon, but eventually grasp that all of the phenomena are caused by a single source.

Four pages of the 24-page booklet are player handouts. A 3-panel gamemaster's screen is also included.

== Publication history ==
West End Games first published the Ghostbusters role-playing game under license in 1986, and immediately followed up with three adventures for the game, one of them being Ghost Toasties. The 24-page adventure was written by Scott Haring, with art by Russ Steffens.

== Reception ==
Fiona Lloyd reviewed Ghost Toasties for White Dwarf #81, and stated that "Overall, the screen is nice, if not essential. Played for giggles, this is a good package."

In Issue 39 of Abyss, Jon Schuller called this "a game which is more marketing than mechanics and oriented towards a juvenile audience ... There are some amusing moments, but it all felt forced to me and I found myself shuddering more often than laughing." Schuller pointed out, "This is an adventure scenario for the kiddies, but even children like drama and conflict and this sort of pandering doesn't do credit to the potential theme of the game." Schuller concluded, "Sometimes Ghost Toasties is cute. Sometimes it is interesting. Generally it is predictable and childish. I really can't recommend it."
