= GURPS Time Travel =

Tabletop role-playing game supplement

- Cover by John Zeleznik
- Designers: Steve Jackson; John M. Ford
- Publishers: Steve Jackson Games
- Publication: 1991; 35 years ago
- Systems: GURPS

GURPS Time Travel is a sourcebook for GURPS. It was written by Steve Jackson and John M. Ford and published by Steve Jackson Games in 1991.

== Contents ==
GURPS Time Travel presents options to allow gamemasters to create systems to match their campaigns, including the way that time streams work. GURPS Time Travel also involves player characters travelling to different worlds.

== Publication history ==
GURPS Time Travel was designed by Steve Jackson and John M. Ford, and published as a 128-page softcover book by Steve Jackson Games. The book was edited by Loyd Blankenship, and features additional material by Chris McCubbin, J.M. Caparula, Walter Milliken, David Pulver, Daniel U. Thibault, and Dale F. Reding. Illustrations are by Dan Frazier, Michael Barrett, Timothy Bradstreet, Topper Helmers, Karl Martin, Doug Shuler, and Dan Smith, with a cover by John Zeleznik.

== Reception ==
GURPS Time Travel won the Origins Award for Best Roleplaying Supplement of 1991.

Rick Swan reviewed GURPS Time Travel for Dragon magazine #191 (March 1993). According to Swan, "GURPS Time Travel borrows ideas from everyone from H.G. Wells to Dr. Who and blends them into a cohesive whole, resulting in the most comprehensive take on time travel to date. Though intended for the GURPS system, the material is generic enough for any system, presuming the referee does his homework. Bursting with baffling jargon and giddy analyses of nonsensical concepts, GURPS Time Travel is exactly the type of book that makes civilians think role-players are out of their minds. Consider that a recommendation."

== Reviews ==
- Dragão Brasil #1 (1994) (Portuguese) (as "Viagem no tempo")
- Envoyer #15

== See also ==
GURPS Infinite Worlds
