= List of Paranoia books =

A list of books for the Paranoia role-playing game, with their ISBN numbers.

== First edition ==
Title	Author(s)	Pub. Date	ISBN	Notes
Paranoia	Dan Gelber, Greg Costikyan, and Eric Goldberg	1984	ISBN 978-0-87431-025-2	First edition of the game. Consists of Player Handbook, Gamemaster Handbook, and Adventure Handbook with introductory adventure Destination: CBI Sector. Boxed set also includes two 10-sided dice.
Paranoia (Games Workshop)	Dan Gelber, Greg Costikyan, and Eric Goldberg	1986	ISBN 978-1-869893-01-9	A Games Workshop printing of the first edition. Contains all three books of the basic set in one hardcover volume, as well as the three short adventures (Robot Imana-665-C, The Trouble with Cockroaches and Das Bot: Nearly a Dozen Meters Beneath the Sea) from the first edition Gamemaster Screen.
Acute Paranoia	Ken Rolston and various	1986	ISBN 978-0-87431-034-4	Articles on supplementary rules and flavor material, including Sanity Tests, Playing Robots, New Secret societies and Better Living Through Chemistry. Contains the full-length adventure Me and My Shadow, Mark IV, mini-adventures Botbusters, Warriors of the Nightcycle and The Harder They Clone, and 8 short missions designated "Code 7": An ARD Day's Night, Reboot Camp, Whitewash, The Second Coming, Plumber's Helper, Miami Laser, Paranoid Clones in Savory Vulture Stew, and Outland-ISH. "Code 7" refers to a mission that takes Troubleshooters seven clones to finish; therefore, with a finite six clone family limit, they are suicide missions.
Clones in Space	Erick Wujcik	1986	ISBN 978-0-87431-042-9	An adventure in which the player characters are sent into space by The Computer. The covers are not stapled to the rest of the book and may be used as a small gamemaster's screen (the reference tables for this adventure are printed on the inside covers).
Double Paranoia	John M. Ford and Curtis Smith	1986	ISBN 978-1-869893-03-3	Contains The YELLOW Clearance Black Box Blues and Vapours Don't Shoot Back (British spelling) reprinted in one volume by Games Workshop in the UK.
Gamemaster Screen	Ken Rolston and Steve Gilbert	1985		Gamemaster's screen and three short adventures: Robot Imana-665-C, The Trouble with Cockroaches and Das Bot: Nearly a Dozen Meters Beneath the Sea. The player side of the screen contains reference tables for players.
HIL Sector Blues	Ken Rolston	1986	ISBN 978-0-87431-051-1	A campaign pack for playing and gamemastering Blue-clearance Internal Security troopers. Contains three short adventures: First Blood and Then Some, IntSec Agents at the Earth's Core, and One of Our Petbots Is Missing. Also includes "Cardstock Commies" (cardboard stand-up figures) and rules for using miniatures. The name of the supplement references Hill Street Blues. The covers are not stapled to the rest of the book and may be used as a small gamemaster's screen (new reference tables are printed on the inside covers).
Orcbusters	Ken Rolston	1986	ISBN 978-0-87431-050-4	An adventure in which an inter-dimensional portal causes a stereotypical fantasy roleplaying dungeon and its residents to appear in Alpha Complex. Dungeons & Dragons parody, takes place in the "DND sector". The covers are not stapled to the rest of the book and may be used as a small gamemaster's screen (the reference tables for this adventure are printed inside).
Send in the Clones	Warren Spector and Allen Varney	1985	ISBN 978-0-87431-033-7	An adventure in which the player characters track Commie traitors through the sewers while someone is singing treasonous old hit songs over the Alpha Complex public address system. The covers are not stapled to the rest of the book and may be used as a small gamemaster's screen (the reference tables for this adventure are printed inside).
Vapors Don't Shoot Back	Curtis Smith	1985	ISBN 978-0-87431-026-9	An adventure containing three missions in which the player characters attempt to carry out contradictory, incomprehensible, and usually lethal instructions from The Computer and a High Programmer. The covers are not stapled to the rest of the book and may be used as a small gamemaster's screen (the reference tables for this adventure are printed inside).
YELLOW Clearance Black Box Blues, The	John M. Ford	1985	ISBN 978-0-87431-027-6	An adventure in which every secret society is after a black box of unknown content. Winner of the H.G. Wells Award for Best Role-playing Adventure of 1985. Includes a two-page cardboard gamemaster's screen with reference tables for this adventure.

== Second edition ==
(Note: Part of the "Secret Society Wars" arc.) (Note: Part of "The Crash" arc, also called the "MegaWhoops".) (Note: Part of the "ReBoot Alpha" arc.) (Note: Part of the "Vulture Warriors of Dimension X" arc.)

Title	Author(s)	Pub. Date	ISBN	Notes
Paranoia Second Edition	Dan Gebler, Greg Costikyan, Eric Goldberg, and Ken Rolston	1987	ISBN 978-0-87431-063-4	Second edition of the game. Includes new introductory adventure Into the Outdoors with Gun and Camera. Boxed set also includes one 20-sided die.
Paranoia Second Edition (Games Workshop)	Dan Gelber, Greg Costikyan, and Eric Goldberg	1987	The ISBN printed on the cover (1-869893-21-1) is invalid	A Games Workshop printing of the second edition of the game. Same as the West End Games original, but hardcover.
Alice Through the Mirrorshades	Ed Bolme	1989	ISBN 978-0-87431-154-9	First adventure in the "Vulture Warriors of Dimension X" arc. Crossover with Cyberpunk as the player characters travel back in time to pre-Alpha San Francisco.
Alpha Complexities	Ed Bolme	1988	ISBN 978-0-87431-080-1	An adventure that takes the player characters into the Outdoors hunting for invisible Commies.
At Your Service, Citizen...	West End Games	1992	N/A	A series of official Paranoia newsletters with articles by various authors. Five issues published from 1992 to 1993 in addition to the issue "zero" that appeared in The Paranoia Sourcebook.
Bot Abusers' Manual, The	Ed Bolme	1992	ISBN 978-0-87431-164-8	Revised rules for bot player characters (updates those in Acute Paranoia for ReBoot Alpha). Also contains the adventure Been Hurt: A Sporting Adventure for Mostly Bots.
Compleat Troubleshooter, The	Steven Gilbert and Doug Kaufman	1987	ISBN 978-0-87431-018-4	Introduces Mandatory Bonus Duties for Troubleshooters. Included with the 2nd edition boxed set.
Computer Always Shoots Twice, The	Ken Rolston, Warren Spector and Allen Varney	1988	ISBN 978-0-87431-087-0	Consists of Send in the Clones and Orcbusters updated for second edition.
Crash Course Manual	Doug Kaufman and Jonatha Caspian	1989	ISBN 978-0-87431-153-2	The Post-MegaWhoops (crash of The Computer) campaign setting. Includes introductory adventure A Passage to NDA Sector by Ed Bolme and Peter Corless.
Death, Lies and Vidtape	Allen Varney	1990	ISBN 978-0-87431-159-4	The final "Secret Society Wars" adventure, in which Elizabeth-R is trying to bring the secret societies together to form a government in Post-MegaWhoops Alpha.
DOA Sector Travelogue, The	Steve Gilbert	1989	ISBN 978-0-87431-078-8	A campaign pack detailing the DOA sector of Alpha Complex. Contains some background for the "Secret Society Wars". Includes a poster-sized map of DOA sector.
Don't Take Your Laser to Town	Malcom Mouvis and Vern G. Hargett	1988	ISBN 978-0-87431-104-4	An adventure set in old WST sector, an Alpha Complex re-creation of the American Old West (based on movie clichés) for amusement of citizens.
Form Pack	Steven Gilbert	1988	ISBN 978-0-87431-079-5	Contains multiple copies of three Alpha Complex forms in triplicate, and a short bureaucratic adventure, A Hole in The Complex, which revolves around filling and filing these forms.
Gamma-LOT	Grant Boucher	1990	ISBN 978-0-87431-158-7	An adventure in which a part of medieval England has been teleported to the LOT sector of Post-MegaWhoops Alpha. A sequel to Orcbusters. Contains parody of King Arthur, Knights of the Round Table and Robin Hood.
Iceman Returneth, The	Sam Shirley	1989	ISBN 978-0-87431-152-5	An adventure featuring a frozen High Programmer from the past, who tries to "fix" The Computer. Includes one possible explanation for The Crash, which also forms the basis for Alice Through the Mirrorshades. Part 3 of the "Secret Society Wars".
Mad Mechs	Paul Murphy	1991	ISBN 978-0-87431-160-0	An adventure featuring the return of The Computer after the Crash, and in which the player characters are sent to Australia to bring back a former Commie mutant traitor in order to save Alpha Complex. A parody of Mad Max.
More Songs About Food Vats	Karl Hughes	1989	ISBN 978-0-87431-151-8	An adventure in which the player characters are assigned to prevent sabotage to the Food Vats. Part 2 of the "Secret Society Wars".
On Ne Vit que Six Fois		1987		An adventure published in France by Jeux Descartes.
Paramilitary	Dave Lemon	1993	ISBN 978-0-87431-167-9	A campaign setting for player characters in the Armed Forces of ReBoot Alpha.
Paranoia Excessory Pack	West End Games	1987	ISBN 978-0-87431-064-1	Contains a gamemaster's screen for the 2nd edition rules, 12 character sheets, 9 forms in triplicate (three different forms with three copies of each), and "Cardstock Commies" (cardboard stand-up figures). The player side of the screen contains reference tables for players and lyrics for "Alpha Complex Battle Hymn" (a parody of The Battle Hymn of the Republic).
Paranoia Sourcebook, The	Ed Bolme	1992	ISBN 978-0-87431-163-1	Campaign setting and sourcebook "update" for the world of ReBoot Alpha (where The Computer has returned but does not control all of the pre-MegaWhoops Alpha Complex). Includes Emergency Services Manual and issue "zero" of the Paranoia newsletter At Your Service, Citizen....
Paranormal / CTV	Ed Gibson, Charles Ginsburg, Brian Schomburg, Jesse Van Valkenburg, and Bill Olmesdahl	1994	ISBN 978-0-87431-169-3	An adventure flip-book. Contains three short adventures in the world of TV and two short adventures in the world of the paranormal.
People's Glorious Revolutionary Adventure, The	Ed Bolme	1989	ISBN 978-0-87431-150-1	An adventure in which the player characters are Commies in the CCCP (Communist Controlled Complex Population), under supervision of Tovarich Computer. Part 1 of the "Secret Society Wars".
R&D Catalog, The	Ed Bolme and C. J. Tramontana	1990	ISBN 978-0-87431-157-0	A catalog of items sold by R&D in the Computer-less Post-MegaWhoops Alpha. Includes the mini-adventure Have Gizmo, Will Travel.
Recycled Pack	West End Games	1989	N/A	Contains multiple forms in triplicate, "Cardstock Commies" (cardboard stand-up figures), and a selection of 56 plastic miniatures. The contents of each pack are different.
Twilightcycle: 2000	Sam Shirley	1990	ISBN 978-0-87431-155-6	"Vulture Warriors of Dimension X", part 2. Crossover with Twilight 2000 as the player characters travel back in time to World War III.
Vulture Warriors of Dimension X	Joseph Anthony and David Avallone	1990	ISBN 978-0-87431-156-3	Time-travelling campaign pack, including the adventure Dr. Whom and the Paranoids of Alpha ("Vulture Warriors of Dimension X", part 3). A parody of Doctor Who.

== Fifth edition ==
Title	Author(s)	Pub. Date	ISBN	Notes
Paranoia: the Fifth Edition	Ed Stark, Greg Farshtey, and Daniel Scott Palter	1995	ISBN 978-0-87431-171-6	Main rulebook of the "Fifth Edition". Contains new introductory adventure Back from the Outdoors, which is a sequel to the 2nd edition adventure Into the Outdoors with Gun and Camera.
Creatures of the Nightcycle	Jennifer Brandes and Chris Hepler	1997	ISBN 978-0-87431-172-3	An adventure spoofing Vampire: The Masquerade. The player characters are turned into "vampclones".
BUG Sector	Chris Helper and Jennifer Brandes	N/A	N/A	An unreleased adventure. The manuscript has been leaked on the Internet.

== Paranoia XP ==
Title	Author(s)	Pub. Date	ISBN	Notes
Paranoia XP	Allen Varney and various	2004	ISBN 978-1-904854-26-5	Main rulebook of the "Paranoia XP" edition. Reprinted in 2005 with errata as Paranoia XP Service Pack 1. "XP" dropped from later printings, making the final title of this edition just Paranoia. Contains the new introductory mission Mr. Bubbles by Dan Curtis Johnson.
Alpha Complex Nights	Gareth Hanrahan	2007	ISBN 978-1-906103-06-4	Three missions: My First Treason, Sweep of Unhistory, and Spin Control.
Alpha Complex Nights 2	Gareth Hanrahan	2008	ISBN 978-1-906103-80-4	Two missions: Viva La Revolution! and The Communist Cafeteria Conspiracy.
Big Book of Bots, The	Gareth Hanrahan	2008	ISBN 978-1-906103-60-6	A sourcebook on bots in Alpha Complex, including rules for bot characters. Includes a Mission Unthinkable, an adventure for bot characters.
Citizen's Guide to Surviving Alpha Complex	Mongoose Publishing	2009	N/A	A condensed version of the basic rules and Alpha Complex background, and the introductory mission Tube Jam.
Crash Priority!	Traitor Recycling Studio	2004	ISBN 978-1-904854-35-7	Five short missions showcasing the different styles of play introduced in Paranoia XP: Stealth Train (Straight), Traitor Backup (Straight), Patch Job (Straight/Classic), Random Access Mission (Classic), and Nyuk Nyuk Nyuk (Zap). The Zap-mission Nyuk Nyuk Nyuk takes inspiration from The Three Stooges.
Criminal Histories	Bill O'Dea and the Traitor Recycling Studio	2006	ISBN 978-1-905176-80-9	Supplemental rules for character background generation. The new rules replace the chapter on character creation in the main rulebook, and include the optional additions from Service, Service! and The Mutant Experience. Also includes Prehistory Pachinko, a set of over 50 tables for random background generation.
Extreme Paranoia	Traitor Recycling Studio	2005	ISBN 978-1-905176-24-3	Supplemental rules for characters of security clearances higher than Red. After an introduction to security clearances in Paranoia, there is a section on each security clearance from Orange through Indigo. The Blue section contains a condensed and updated version of HIL Sector Blues, including two short missions.
Flashbacks	Various	2005	ISBN 978-1-904854-40-1	Updated versions of the adventures Robot Imana 665-C, The Trouble with Cockroaches, Das Bot, Vapors Don't Shoot Back, The YELLOW Clearance Black Box Blues, Send in the Clones, Me and My Shadow Mark 4, Alpha Complexities, An ARD Day's Night, Reboot Camp, Whitewash, and the new introductory mission Pre-Paranoia by Jeff Groves. Updates to old missions include removal of puns from character names, but the original names are given in an appendix.
Flashbacks II	Various	2007	ISBN 978-1-905850-04-4	Updated versions of the adventures Orcbusters, Clones in Space, and The People's Glorious Revolutionary Adventure. Does not include the original pre-generated player characters of any mission.
Gamemaster's Screen & Mandatory Fun Enforcement Pack	Aaron Allston, Allen Varney and members of Paranoia-Live.net	2004	ISBN 978-1-904854-49-4	A gamemaster's screen and the Mandatory Fun Enforcement Pack, which includes 6 forms and "Mission Blender" tables for generating random missions. The player side of the screen contains humorous one-liners ("fortune cookies") about the game.
Little RED Book, The	Allen Varney	2006	ISBN 978-1-905471-56-0	Abridged core rules containing just the information cleared for players (designated "RED clearance" in Paranoia materials; hence the title).
Mandatory Mission Pack	Gareth Hanrahan	2008	ISBN 978-1-906103-81-1	Gamemaster ideas and aids for constructing Paranoia missions.
Mutant Experience, The	R. Eric Reuss	2005	ISBN 978-1-904854-65-4	A sourcebook on mutants in Alpha Complex. Introduces new mutant powers and elaborates on the ones described in the main rules. Also includes rules for mutagens and medications affecting mutant powers.
Sector Zero	Gareth Hanrahan, Saul Resnikoff, and Jeff Groves	2006	ISBN 978-1-905471-52-2	Contains three Classic-style "Sector Zero" missions: Bubblegum Run, The Dinner Party, and Lightning Rod. The term "Sector Zero" is introduced as jargon for punishment duty, or a dispiriting assignment nobody else wanted.
Service, Service!	Traitor Recycling Studio	2005	ISBN 978-1-905176-72-4	A sourcebook on the service groups and service firms of Alpha Complex. Contains eight Classic-style missions, one for each service group: Spurious Targets (Armed Forces), The Lightbulb Missions (CPU), Rockumentary (HPD&MC), Nightcycle Shift (Internal Security), Going Postal (PLC), Both Sides Now (Power Services), Troublebots (R&D), and Three Up, Three Down (Technical Services).
STUFF	Eric Minton and the Traitor Recycling Studio	2005	ISBN 978-1-904854-86-9	A sourcebook of equipment available for purchase in Alpha Complex, presented for players in the form of "CBay" listings with comments from "other buyers".
STUFF 2: The Gray Subnets	Eric Minton and the Traitor Recycling Studio	2007	ISBN 978-1-906508-16-6	A sourcebook of (mostly) illegal/treasonous equipment, presented for players in the form of "CBay" listings with comments from "other buyers". The gamemaster's section lists the "real" properties of the same items.
Sweep of Unhistory / My First Treason	Gareth Hanrahan	2007	ISBN 978-1-906103-04-0	A flip-book containing the adventures Sweep of Unhistory and My First Treason. The adventures were re-published in Alpha Complex Nights together with Spin Control.
Thin Green Line, The	Gareth Hanrahan	2008	ISBN 978-1-906103-76-7	A sourcebook on running missions for player characters in the Armed Forces. Includes One Man Army, a short mission for Armed Forces characters.
Traitor's Manual, The	Gareth Hanrahan	2004	ISBN 978-1-904854-27-2	A sourcebook on secret societies, detailing all 16 secret societies presented in the main rulebook of this edition. Includes the short Classic-style mission Down and Out in Alpha Complex.
Underplex, The	Paul Baldowski	2006	ISBN 978-1-905471-13-3	A sourcebook on the abandoned and forgotten parts beneath and between the populated sectors of Alpha Complex. Includes the short Classic-style mission The One.
War on [Insert Noun]	Gareth Hanrahan	2009	ISBN 978-1-905850-60-0	Three linked missions: Null Mission, War on [Insert Noun Here], and Heck of a (Screw) Job Citizen. In these missions the player characters are assigned to an entirely new service group, "Department of Complex Operational Defence".
WMD	Traitor Recycling Studio	2005	ISBN 978-1-905176-14-4	Four Straight-style missions: Infohazard, Hunger, WMD, and Hot Potato. Hunger is based on The Great Leap Forward of the People's Republic of China, and places the player characters in charge of a new "miraculous" method of food production.

== 25th Anniversary Edition ==
Title	Author(s)	Pub. Date	ISBN	Notes
Paranoia: Troubleshooters	Allen Varney and Gareth Hanrahan	2009	ISBN 978-1-906508-55-5	Self-contained rulebook for Paranoia games involving Troubleshooter player characters. Includes two missions: Robot Imana-665-C (from the 1st edition Gamemaster Screen supplement), and The Quantum Traitor (new).
Paranoia: Troubleshooters: Black Missions	Allen Varney and Gareth Hanrahan	2009	ISBN 978-1-906508-62-3	A limited edition (1,000 copies) of Paranoia: Troubleshooters, featuring a black cover and including a CD-ROM with interviews of Paranoia authors, a selection of Paranoia sound effects, a Paranoia screensaver for Microsoft Windows, and PDF versions of most supplements published for the previous edition (Paranoia XP).
Paranoia: High Programmers	Gareth Hanrahan	2010	ISBN 978-1-907218-09-5	Self-contained rulebook for Paranoia games with Ultraviolet-clearance High Programmers as player characters. Includes the mission Disaster Management.
Paranoia: High Programmers: White Washes	Gareth Hanrahan	2010	N/A	A limited edition (100 copies) of Paranoia: High Programmers, featuring a white cover in the same style as Troubleshooters: Black Missions.
Paranoia: Internal Security	Gareth Hanrahan	2009	ISBN 978-1-906508-69-2	Self-contained rulebook for Paranoia games with Internal Security Troopers as player characters. Includes two short introductory missions: Six Clones Before Breakfastcycle (new), and IntSec Agents at the Earth's Core (from HIL Sector Blues, but tweaked).
Paranoia: Internal Security: Blue Line	Gareth Hanrahan	2009	N/A	A limited edition (100 copies) of Paranoia: Internal Security, featuring a blue cover in the same style as Troubleshooters: Black Missions.
Flashbacks Redux	Various	2011	ISBN 978-1-907702-09-9	Updated reprint of the Mandatory Mission Pack and the following adventures for Troubleshooter player characters: Clones in Space, Orcbusters, My First Treason, Yellow Clearance Black Box Blues, Me and My Shadow Mark IV, Pre-Paranoia, Vapours Don't Shoot Back, and the short "Code 7" missions from Acute Paranoia.
Flashbacks Redux Redux	Various	2011	ISBN 978-1-907702-33-4	Updated reprints of the following adventures for Troubleshooter player characters: Spin Control, Citizens' Guide to Surviving Alpha Complex, My First Treason, Sweep of Unhistory, The Communist Cafeteria Conspiracy, Viva la Revolution!, and The Peoples' Glorious Revolutionary Adventure.
Flashbacks Redux Redux - Materials Treacherously Deleted	Various	2012	N/A	Contains The Great Outdoors—a sourcebook for adventuring outside Alpha Complex—as well as reprints of the following adventures for Troubleshooter player characters: Alpha Complexities, Das Bot, Send in the Clones, and The Trouble with Cockroaches. The adventures were supposed to appear in Flashbacks Redux Redux but were accidentally left out; this supplement was offered to customers as recompense.
A Funny Thing Happened on the Way to the Termination Booth	Gareth Hanrahan	2010	ISBN 978-1-907218-17-0	A mission for Troubleshooter player characters, who are ordered to escort a noted traitor to his public execution. The cover incorrectly states that the adventure is "for use with Internal Security", even though the adventure is for Paranoia: Troubleshooters.
Mr. Bubbles	Dan Curtis Johnson	2010	ISBN 978-1-907218-41-5	A mission for Troubleshooter player characters, involving trouble with e-mail spam, scrubbots and malware. Originally published in Paranoia XP as the introductory mission.
None of This Is My Fault	Gareth Hanrahan	2010	ISBN 978-1-907218-22-4	Two missions and a minigame for High Programmer player characters: Joy in the Morningcycle where the player characters fight over the services of a famous chef, The Iceman Returneth (Again) in which a member of the Computer's original support staff is found cryogenically frozen (a remake of the 2nd edition The Iceman Returneth from a High Programmer perspective), and the minigame When Things Were Interesting in which each player character manages their own FunBall team.
Paranoia Forms Pack	Gareth Hanrahan	2009	ISBN 978-1-906508-85-2	A collection of Alpha Complex forms. Includes 9 generic forms, 6 forms for Troubleshooters, 6 forms for Internal Security, and 3 forms for High Programmers. Unlike the 2nd edition Form Pack, the forms are presented as a book, not as actual forms in triplicate.
Paranoia Games Master's Screen	Gareth Hanrahan	2010	ISBN 978-1-906508-67-8	A game master's screen for Troubleshooters, Internal Security, and High Programmers.
Termination Quota Exceeded	Gareth Hanrahan	2009	ISBN 978-1-906508-71-5	Three missions for Paranoia: Internal Security: Where's the Beef about the theft of a genetically engineered organism, The Survivor, in which a team of Troopers ends up in an isolated town inspired by The Prisoner, and Termination Quota Exceeded, in which a large number of termination vouchers must be used before they expire in a matter of hours.
Treason in Word and Deed	Gareth Hanrahan	2009	ISBN 978-1-906508-70-8	Three missions for Paranoia: Troubleshooters: Treason in Word and Deed, in which a team of Troubleshooter characters is locked in a vault for 72 hours of loyalty tests, Heroes of Our Complex, in which a vid-show action hero is assigned to a series of suicide missions along with the player characters, and Little Lost Scoutbot, in which the Troubleshooters are sent outdoors to find a missing bot or its remains.

== Red Clearance Edition ==
Title	Author(s)	Pub. Date	ISBN	Notes
Paranoia - Red Clearance Starter Set	James Wallis, Grant Howitt, Paul Dean	2017	ISBN 978-1-908460-64-6	Core set required to play the Red Clearance Edition. Includes Player's Handbook, Gamesmaster's Handbook, Mission Book with three missions, 110 playing cards, and character cards
Implausible Deniability	Gareth Hanrahan	2017	ISBN 978-1-908460-72-1	A mission in which the players investigate food vats
Yellow Clearance Black Box Blues (Remastered)	John M. Ford	2017	ISBN 978-1-908460-71-4	An updated version of the classic 1st edition adventure
Acute PARANOIA	W J MacGuffin, Amanda Cherry, Greg Ingber, Dan Curtis Johnson, Ed Turner	2019	ISBN 978-1-908460-79-0	A self-described "massive upgrade" featuring bot troubleshooters, health insurance, insanity bingo cards, the outdoors, the underplex, and more. Includes the Troubleshooter's Survival Guide, Gamesmaster's Despotic Powers Book, Mission Book 2.0, Bot Character Cards, Mental Disorder Bingo Cards, and a new deck of cards with a variety of new equipment, mutant powers, and more.
Truth or Dare	Greg Ingber	2019	ISBN 978-1-908460-82-0	An adventure in which players go undercover to infiltrate the Death Leopard secret society
Project Infinite Hole	W J MacGuffin, Jason Brick, Keith Garrett, Lara Turner, Jamie Brewer, Eran Aviram, Stephen Whitehead	2021	ISBN 978-1913076269	An expansion launched on Kickstarter in March 2020, focussing on R&D

== Paranoia Perfect Edition ==
Title	Author(s)	Pub. Date	ISBN	Notes
Paranoia Core Book, The	WJ MacGuffin, Keith Garrett	2023	ISBN 978-1-913076-92-4	The core rule book for Paranoia Perfect Edition.
Paranoia 404 Compendium	WJ MacGuffin, Keith Garrett, Greg Ingber	2023	ISBN 978-1-916675-15-5	A compendium containing generic NPCs, mission complications, secret society flyers, a character-generation mini-game, and more.
Paranoia Brave New Missions	WJ MacGuffin, Keith Garrett, Greg Ingber	2023	ISBN 978-1-916675-07-0	A mission book with five playable missions for Paranoia Perfect Edition including Certifiable, In The Clouds, Meet'n'Greet, Stealth Train Redux, and Viva VEG Sector.
The Paranoia Accomplice Book	WJ MacGuffin, Keith Garrett, Greg Ingber	2023	ISBN 978-1-913076-93-1	An additions guide with information on using rules from older editions, ways of creating your own missions, Alpha Complex celebrities (such as Teela-O-MLY), customizable rules, and more.
Paranoia Gamemaster's Screen	WJ MacGuffin, Keith Garrett	2023	ISBN 978-1-913076-93-1	A game master's screen for Paranoia Perfect Edition that includes charts and tables for various mechanics.
Citizen In Name Only	WJ MacGuffin	2024	ISBN 978-191-667519-3	An adventure
Mandatory Fun	WJ Macguffin	2024	ISBN 978-191-667520-9	An adventure

== Other Game Products ==
Title	Author(s)	Pub. Date	ISBN	Notes
Paranoia: The Mandatory Card Game	Steve Gilbert	2005	N/A	A card game for 3 to 8 players. Won Gamer's Choice Best Traditional Card Game of the Year, 2005 Origins Awards

== Fiction ==
- Hanrahan, Gareth. Paranoia S1 Reality Optional. Ultraviolet Books. ASIN B006K1FG0W.
- MacGuffin, WJ. Paranoia A1 The Computer is Your Friend. Ultraviolet Books. ASIN B0076FQT9I.
- Varney, Allen. Paranoia T1 Stay Alert (The Troubleshooter Rules). Ultraviolet Books. ASIN B006K1FIW8.
- MacGuffin, WJ. Paranoia Y1 Traitor Hangout. Ultraviolet Books. ASIN B006PCTOOK.

=== Novels ===
- Bolme, Ed (1993). Title Deleted for Security Reasons. West End Games. ISBN 978-0-87431-165-5.
- Rolston, Ken (1991). Extreme Paranoia: Nobody Knows The Trouble I've Shot. West End Games. ISBN 978-0-87431-162-4.
- Lidberd (1993). Stormshooters and Troubleknights. West End Games. ISBN 978-0-87431-168-6. (A Paranoia/Torg crossover novel)

=== Comics ===
- O'Connor, Paul (1992). Paranoia. 1–6. Adventure Comics (A Malibu Comics division).
