= 2005 in games =

This page lists board and card games, wargames, miniatures games, and tabletop role-playing games published in 2005. For video games, see 2005 in video gaming.

== Games released or invented in 2005 ==
- Arkham Horror (originally released in 1987 by Chaosium)
- Anachronism
- Australia: Aufbruch ins Abenteuer
- Axis & Allies Miniatures
- Beowulf: The Legend
- Bonaparte at Marengo
- Breakscore
- Capes
- Case Closed Trading Card Game
- Caylus
- ChiZo Rising
- Codename: Kids Next Door Trading Card Game
- Cyberpunk V3 (role-playing game)
- d20 Apocalypse (role-playing game supplement)
- d20 Past (role-playing game supplement)
- Dark Millennium
- Dawning Star (role-playing game)
- Descent: Journeys in the Dark
- Diamant
- Diceland: Cyburg
- Diceland: Dragons
- ’’Dinosaur King’’
- Dragon Booster Trading Card Game
- Dragons of Kir
- EcoFluxx
- EinStein würfelt nicht
- Embassy chess
- Epic Battles
- Euphrates and Tigris Card Game
- Fairy Tale
- Federation Commander: Klingon Border
- Family Fluxx
- Fjords
- Fullmetal Alchemist Trading Card Game
- Glory to Rome
- Gundam War Collectible Card Game
- GURPS Infinite Worlds
- Hecatomb (collectible card game)
- Hollyworld (role-playing game)
- Infinite Armies
- Infinity (wargame)
- Inkan aarre
- Key Largo
- Khet: The Laser Game
- Kruzno
- Louis XIV
- Manila
- Nexus Ops
- The Nightmare Before Christmas Trading Card Game
- Panzer Grenadier: Eastern Front
- Panzer Grenadier: Road to Berlin
- Parthenon: Rise of the Aegean
- Pentago
- Pimp: The Backhanding
- PÜNCT
- Railroad Tycoon
- RoboRally (second edition)
- Rocketmen: Axis of Evil
- Runebound
- Saganami Island Tactical Simulator
- Serenity (role-playing game)
- Shadow Hunters
- Shadows over Camelot
- Sleeping Queens
- Sonic X Trading Card Game
- Starship Troopers: The Miniatures Game
- Starship Troopers: The Roleplaying Game
- Star Wars Risk: The Clone Wars Edition
- Terakh
- Ticket to Ride Europe
- TransEuropa
- Truth & Justice (role-playing game)
- Tsuro
- Twilight Imperium (third edition, first released in 1998)
- Twilight Struggle
- Usagi Yojimbo Role-Playing Game
- Vegas Showdown
- WARMACHINE Apotheosis
- Weapons of the Gods (role-playing game)
- Werewolf: The Forsaken (role-playing game)
- Wits and Wagers
- World of Warcraft: The Board Game
- Xiaolin Showdown Trading Card Game
- Zatch Bell! The Card Battle

== Game awards given in 2005 ==
- Game of the Year and Gamers Choice for Best Miniatures (Origins Awards): WARMACHINE Apotheosis
- Games: Australia

== Deaths ==
Date	Name	Age	Notability
January 2	Frank Kelly Freas	82	illustrator
January 29	Ephraim Kishon	80	Writer who also designed games
March 9	Redmond A. Simonsen	62	wargame designer
March 11	Karen Wynn Fonstad	59	cartographer of fictional worlds
March 12	Edward E. Simbalist	61	RPG designer, co-creator of Chivalry & Sorcery
June 6	David C. Sutherland III	56	illustrator, known for work on Dungeons & Dragons
October 26	Keith Parkinson	47	illustrator, known for work on Dungeons & Dragons

== See also ==
- 2005 in video gaming
