= Pimp (disambiguation) =

A pimp is someone who finds and manages clients for prostitutes and engages them in prostitution in order to profit from their earnings.

Pimp or pimping may also refer to:

== Films ==
- Pimp (2010 film), a British film
- Pimp (2018 film), an American film
- Iceberg Slim: Portrait of a Pimp (2012), a biographical documentary film produced by Ice-T

== Music ==
- Pimp C, a rapper
- "Pimp", a song by hHead from Jerk (1994)
- "P.I.M.P." (2003), a hip hop single by 50 Cent
- "Pimpin'", a song by Hollywood Undead from Swan Songs (2008)
- "The Pimp" (2002), an EP by Fatboy Slim
- "The Pimp" (2006), a song by The Fratellis

== Other uses ==
- Pimp: The Backhanding, a card game
- Pimp: The Story of My Life (1967), autobiography by Iceberg Slim
- Pimping (in baseball), showboating for fans
- Solanum pimpinellifolium, a wild species of tomato

== See also ==
- PMIP (disambiguation)
