= Twilightcycle: 2000 =

1990 role-playing game adventure

Twilightcycle: 2000 is a 1990 role-playing game adventure for Paranoia published by West End Games.

== Plot summary ==
Twilightcycle: 2000 is an adventure in which a crossover for Paranoia and Twilight: 2000 has the player characters time travel back to the 21st Century.

== Publication history ==
Twilightcycle: 2000 was written by Sam Shirley, with art by Russ Steffens, and was published by West End Games in 1990 as a 40-page book.

Shannon Appelcline explained that Twilightcycle: 2000 was the second of three time travel Paranoia adventures (the first being Alice through the Mirrorshades, and the last being Vulture Warriors of Dimension X) published after destruction of the Computer in Crash Course Manual (1989). While the goal of these adventures was for the player characters to reboot the Computer, the adventures also featured crossovers between role-playing games, a rare element in the world of roleplaying.

== Reception ==
Games International magazine reviewed Twilightcycle: 2000 and stated that "after the wackiness of the Paranoia/Cyberpunk team-up Alice Thru the Mirrorshades it just had to be another Vulture Warriors of Dimension X adventure. You really should play Alice first, so whether you get this or not depends on whether you liked part one."

S. John Ross reviewed Twilightcycle: 2000 in White Wolf #27 (June/July, 1991), rating it a 3 out of 5 and stated that "If you have Alice Through the Mirrorshades, and liked it, then you will find this a worthy sequel. If you are anybody else, you may only be confused."
