= Catino (disambiguation) =

Catino is a village in the commune of Poggio Catino, Rieti, Italy.

Catino may also refer to:

- Sacro Catino, an artifact
- Gregory of Catino (1060–aft. 1130), a monk of the Abbey of Farfa
- Charlie Catino, designer of the 2005 board game Nexus Ops

== See also ==
- Cataño
