= 1I =

1I may refer to:

- 1i Productions, an American board game publisher
- SSH 1I (WA), part of which became Washington State Route 525
- 1I/2017 U1 (ʻOumuamua), abbreviated 1I, the first observed interstellar object passing through the Solar System.
- One eye

== See also ==
- CACNA1I
- I1 (disambiguation)
