= 2005 Origins Award winners =

The following are the winners of the 32nd annual Origins Award, held in 2006:

| Category | Winner | Company | Designer(s) |
|---|---|---|---|
| Game of the Year | WARMACHINE: Apotheosis | Privateer Press, Inc. | Matt Wilson, Jason Soles, and Rob Stoddard |
| Board Game of the Year | Parthenon: Rise of the Aegean | Siren Bridge Publishing, Inc. & Z-Man Games, Inc | Andrew Parks and Jason Hawkins |
| Collectible Card Game or Expansion of the Year | Ravnica: City of Guilds expansion for Magic: The Gathering | Wizards of the Coast | Mark Rosewater, Aaron Forsythe, Tyler Bielman, Richard Garfield, and Mike Elliott |
| Traditional Card Game of the Year | Gloom | Atlas Games | Keith Baker |
| Role-Playing Game of the Year | Artesia | Archaia Studios Press | Mark Smylie |
| Role-Playing Game Supplement of the Year | GURPS Infinite Worlds 4th Edition | Steve Jackson Games | Kenneth Hite, Steve Jackson, and John M. Ford |
| Miniatures Game or Expansion of the Year | ATZ - All Things Zombie | Two Hour Wargames | Ed Teixeira |
| Miniatures of the Year | Wargods of Aegyptus | Crocodile Games | Chris FitzPatrick |
| Historical Board Game of the Year | Lock ‘N Load: Band of Heroes | Matrix Games | Mark H. Walker |
| Historical Miniature Game or Expansion of the Year | Gutshot | Hawgleg Publishing | Mike Mitchell, Mike Murphy and Paul Mauer |
| Historical Miniatures of the Year | 10mm WWII Personality Set | Game Figures, Inc | David Higgs |
| Nonfiction Publication of the Year | Historical Miniature Gamer Magazine | Legio X, Inc. | Kathy Plamback and Mike Cosentino |
| Game Accessory of the Year | The 13th Hour - Roleplaying Soundtrack | Midnight Syndicate Soundtracks | Edward Douglas and Gavin Goszka |
| Vanguard Innovative Game Awards | Darter | Future Magic Games | Jason Conkey and Dove Byrne |
| Vanguard Innovative Game Awards | Perplex City | Mind Candy | Michael Smith and Adrian Hon |
| Vanguard Innovative Game Awards | Polarity | Temple Games, Inc. | Doug Seaton |
| Vanguard Innovative Game Awards | XIG: The Four Elements | GT2 Fun & Games Inc. | Greg Scott, Greg Waring, Tor Nawrot, and Tim Huesken |
| Vanguard Unique Game Awards | Battleground: Fantasy Warfare | Your Move Games, Inc. | Robert Dougherty and Chad Ellis |
| Vanguard Unique Game Awards | Infinite Armies | BTRC | Greg Porter |
| Vanguard Unique Game Awards | Rocketmen: Axis of Evil | WizKids | Jordan Weisman, Jon Leitheusser, and Shane Small |
| Vanguard Unique Game Awards | World at War | Matrix Games | Gary Grigsby |
| Gamer's Choice Best Board Game of the Year | Shadows Over Camelot | Days of Wonder | Authors: Bruno Cathala and Serge Lage Illustration and Graphic Design: Cyrille Daujean and Julien Delval |
| Gamer's Choice Best Collectible Card Game of the Year | Anachronism | TriKing Games | Michael Brown |
| Gamer's Choice Best Traditional Card Game of the Year | Paranoia: The Mandatory Card Game | Mongoose Publishing | Steve Gilbert |
| Gamer's Choice Best Historical Game of the Year | Axis and Allies Collectible Miniatures Game | Avalon Hill / Wizards of the Coast | Richard Baker (lead), Paul Barclay, Aaron Forsythe, Devin Low, and Jonathan Tweet |
| Gamer's Choice Best Role Playing Game of the Year | Serenity | Margaret Weis Productions, Ltd | Jamie Chambers |
| Gamer's Choice Best Miniatures of the Year | WARMACHINE: Apotheosis | Privateer Press, Inc. | Matt Wilson, Jason Soles, and Rob Stoddard |

== Hall of Fame inductees ==
- Aaron Allston
- Jolly R. Blackburn
- Rodger MacGowan
- Dennis Mize (posthumous)
- Mike Pondsmith
- James Ernest

== Hall of Fame Game inductees ==
- Star Fleet Battles
