= Vapors Don't Shoot Back =

Tabletop role-playing game adventure

Vapors Don't Shoot Back is an adventure published by West End Games in 1985 for the humorous dystopian science-fiction role-playing game Paranoia.

== Plot summary ==
Vapors Don't Shoot Back is a set of three short connected scenarios, where the Orange-Clearance player characters unwittingly become involved in a deadly (and illegal) annual competition between several High Programmers for the coveted Big Ashtray of the Hilton.

== Publication history ==
West End Games published the light-hearted role-playing game Paranoia in 1984. The next year, West End released the first full-length Paranoia adventure, Vapors Don't Shoot Back, a 32-page book written by Curtis Smith, with art by Jim Holloway. The book came with a detachable front cover that could serve as a gamemaster's screen.

== Reception ==
In the November 1985 edition of White Dwarf (Issue #71), Marcus L. Rowland thought Vapors Don't Shoot Back was "a fun adventure with no obvious flaws." He did warn that combat encounters were especially lethal, and suggested that playing with any less than five characters "is fairly ludicrous." He concluded by giving this adventure an average overall rating of 7 out of 10.

== Other reviews ==
- Casus Belli Aug 1985 (Issue 27, "Têtes d'Affiche" [in French])
- Casus Belli #34 (Aug 1986)

== Other recognition ==
A copy of Vapors Don't Shoot Back is held in the collection of the Strong National Museum of Play (object 117.82).
