= Orcbusters =

Role-playing game supplement

Orcbusters is a 1986 role-playing game adventure for Paranoia published by West End Games.

== Contents ==
Orcbusters is an adventure which features a dungeon crawl and other fantasy roleplaying elements.

== Reception ==
Marc Gascoigne reviewed Orcbusters for White Dwarf #82, and stated that "Ken Rolston [...] was a designer for TSR. He's certainly used this adventure to get it all out his system – he doesn't let slip a single opportunity to squeeze yet another brain-wrenching joke out of his material. But he does this while still maintaining a plot so creaky it ought to be a door in Call of Cthulhu."

Don Towers reviewed Orcbusters in Space Gamer/Fantasy Gamer No. 78. Towers commented that "Orc-busters, while good, does not fully match the standards set [by previous Paranoia releases]."
