= The Bot Abusers' Manual =

The Bot Abusers' Manual is a 1992 role-playing supplement for Paranoia published by West End Games.

== Contents ==
The Bot Abusers' Manual is a supplement in which bots are detailed as player character troubleshooters.

== Reception ==
S. John Ross reviewed The Bot Abusers' Manual in White Wolf #34 (Jan./Feb., 1993), rating it a 4 out of 5 and stated that "I don't mind the lack of deadliness - that's not what made Paranoia funny in the past. I DO mind the lack of roleplaying potential."
