= Tales of the Arabian Nights (board game) =

Tales of the Arabian Nights is a board game published by West End Games in 1985 based on One Thousand and One Nights.

== Publication history ==
Tales of the Arabian Nights was designed by Eric Goldberg, and published by West End Games in 1985. It was re-issued in 2009 by Z-Man Games in a revised and much expanded form.

== Gameplay (West End Games edition) ==
Tales of the Arabian Nights is a paragraph-based storytelling board game where each player travels through the Arabian desert, experiencing adventures taken from the original One Thousand and One Nights. Players gain and lose statuses from these adventures, earning Story Points and Destiny Points. After earning enough points to become a sultan, the player can return to Baghdad to win the game.

== Reception ==
In the September-October edition of Space Gamer (No. 76), Wayne D. Yee gave a thumbs-up, saying, "Tales of the Arabian Nights is excellent. It has something for everyone. Do not be put off by the steep price; this game is worth it."

Larry DiTillio reviewed Tales of the Arabian Nights for Different Worlds magazine and stated that "to sum up, if you're a sucker for wild-eyed efreeti, wicked viziers, magical treasures, and just plain gosh-darn-Arabian-Nights-style fun, then Tales of the Arabian Nights should be your oasis in the desert. It wears as many hats as a hydra and marvelously blends them all into a game that merits both your time and your money. Trust in Allah, toss down your shekels and enjoy! Wa-Salamm-Alaikum!"

In the December 1993 edition of Dragon (Issue 200), Allen Varney gave the game a balanced review: "The rules are a bit clunky, and there’s little interaction, but the real fun lies in watching your friends join Bedouin tribes, fight a roc, or get sex-changed. If your group thinks fast and likes theater, you’ll have a good loud time with this storytelling game."

This game was chosen for inclusion in the 2007 book Hobby Games: The 100 Best. Jeff Grubb commented, "Tales of the Arabian Nights succeeds because its rules match its subject matter so well. The paragraph system within the Book of Tales nicely mirrors the type of original storytelling in content, framework, and descriptive language. The original One Thousand and One Nights (translated into English many times, from the bowdlerizing E.W. Lane to the bawdy Sir Richard Francis Burton) were a collection of short adventures, sometimes spun out serially, but just as often nested one within the other like Russian matryoshka dolls. The game experience is similar: your encounter with the friendly hunchback can lead you to a kindly efreet, who in turn gives you the opportunity to enter a place of power in the distant islands to the north (Stonehenge). The tales naturally spin out of each other, each being short and self-contained. The game similarly stresses the episodic nature of these magical tales."

== Reviews ==
- Casus Belli #38 (June 1987)
- Jeux & Stratégie #45 (as "Le Jeu des Mille et Une Nuits")
- 1985 Games 100
