= Commando (role-playing game) =

Tabletop military role-playing game

Cover art by David Wenzel

Commando is a role-playing game published by Simulations Publications, Inc. (SPI) in 1979.

== Description ==
Commando is a man-to-man tactical combat game that simulates commando operations from World War II to the present. Although it was marketed as a role-playing game, reviewers called it primarily a board wargame with a set of role-playing rules grafted onto it. The role-playing rules include character creation, skills, cooperative fire teams, and hero characters.

=== Components ===
The game box contains:

- twelve geomorphic 11" x 17" double-sided paper maps with a square grid scaled at 3 m per square
- 47-page wargame rulebook
- 23-page role-playing rulebook
- two copies of 8-page booklet of charts
- addenda sheet dated September 1979
- two 20-sided dice
- four small six-sided dice

=== Gameplay ===
If using the role-playing rules, a group of players create commando characters to be sent out on missions presented by a gamemaster. The players can increase the hero rating of their character at the end of each successful mission. These can be used to gain special abilities.

== Publication history ==
Commando was designed by Eric Goldberg as the first commercial role-playing game with a modern military theme. It was published by SPI in 1979 as a boxed set with cover art by David Wenzel and graphic design by Redmond A. Simonsen. After publication, the game appeared on SPI's Top Ten Bestseller list for four months, rising as high as #4.

== Reception ==
In Moves #57, Ian Chadwick liked the game, saying, "It's a good game, a remarkably smooth system which has accepted the compromise of a lightweight framework in exchange for a well designed, complete tactical system."

In Issue 65 of Fire & Movement, Jeff Petraska wrote, "Commando uses no counters and has square grid maps and at first glance looks a bit unwieldy. With some play experience however, the game shows itself to be a lot of fun and a good simulation of commando operations."

Joe Scolari, writing a retrospective review in Simulacrum #6, recalled that the game could be played as both a straight two-player wargame, or as a role-playing game, but noted unlike many modern games, Commando had a plethora of optional rules and charts. He concluded, "Commando furnishes all the details, charts, and rules you'd expect from a wargame from back then, which makes it the kind of game that tends to send today's gamers running in terror!"

== Other reviews and commentary ==
- Phoenix #24
- Campaign #97
- The American Wargamer Vol.7 #6
- Fantastic Science Fiction v27 n10

== Awards ==
At the 1980 Origins Awards, Commando won the H.G. Wells Award for "Best Roleplaying Rules of 1979."
