= The Iceman Returneth =

Humorous tabletop role-playing adventure

- Cover by Bret Blevins
- Designers: Sam Shirley
- Publishers: West End Games
- Publication: 1989; 37 years ago
- Genres: Humor; science fiction
- Systems: custom

The Iceman Returneth is a humorous adventure written by Sam Shirley, for the dystopian science fiction role-playing game Paranoia.

== Plot summary ==
The Troubleshooters (player characters) are tasked with taking a bag full of "Communist propaganda" to the trash, and on their way, they hear a loud explosion. Upon investigating, they discover a cryogenic box from which emerges one of the Complex's original programmers, Clem. The Troubleshooters are immediately arrested and charged with causing the explosion and being in possession of Communist propaganda. They are sentenced to be executed live on the "Alpha Team Show". They are rescued by Clem, and accompany him to Des Moines to gather the resources needed to reboot the Computer. When the Troubleshooters follow Clem's instructions, The Computer crashes permanently.

This programming error was called "The MegaWhoops" in later Paranoia adventures. Subsequent adventures took place in the era known as "PostMegaWhoops."

== Publication history ==
The Iceman Returneth was written by Sam Shirley, with a cover by Bret Blevins, and illustrations by Valerie Valusek, and was first published by West End Games in 1989 as a 40-page book.

In 2010, a sequel to this adventure by Allen Varney, The Iceman Returneth Again, appeared in the three-adventure anthology None of This is My Fault published by Mongoose Publishing for their reboot of the Paranoia franchise. In the introduction, Varney calls the "MegaWhoops" plotline of the original adventure "massively controversial", saying that it "heralded the impending wipe-out of Paranoia’s viability as a continuing game line."

== Reception ==
In the March-April 1990 edition of Space Gamer/Fantasy Gamer (No. 88), Leo Eric Shepherd liked this scenario, saying, "The adventure is well-written and quite humorous, and the illustrations, though a departure from the stark Paranoia norm, are well-done. The players get exposed to a bewildering variety of life-threatening events, sure to confuse even the cleverest player."

In a 2010 article about adapting various role-playing adventures to the Doctor Who Role-Playing Game, Nick Seidler suggested The Iceman Returneth would be a good candidate for this, noting, "Played by itself the game is a bit of a comedy, importing it to Doctor Who, a GM can keep it a comedy or make it high drama."
