= On Ne Vit que Six Fois =

On Ne Vit que Six Fois is a 1987 role-playing game adventure published by Jeux Descartes for Paranoia.

== Plot summary ==
On Ne Vit que Six Fois is an adventure in which Red to Yellow clearance player characters, after eliminating a traitor, must race against time to find a missing person amid hidden complications.

== Reviews ==
- Casus Belli #42
- Jeux & Stratégie #49
