= Paranoia Form Pack =

Tabletop role-playing game accessory

Paranoia Form Pack is a 1988 role-playing game accessory for Paranoia published by West End Games.

== Contents ==
Paranoia Form Pack includes ten Form Request Forms, four Equipment/Weapon/Vehicle Request Forms, and four Equipment Complaint Forms for damaged equipment.

== Reception ==
Don Towers reviewed Paranoia Form Pack in Space Gamer/Fantasy Gamer No. 83. Towers commented that "You should be selective as to whether you want to include this accessory into your games. The humor might wear off too quickly to be of lasting value, whereas the money spent on the usually well-written modules is of better value."

== Reviews ==
- Challenge #34 (1988)
- Dragon #144 (April, 1989)
