= I1 =

I1, i1, or I-1 may refer to:

- Haplogroup I-M253, a human Y-chromosome haplogroup occurring at greatest frequency in Scandinavia
- Japanese submarine I-1, a 1926 Imperial Japanese Navy submarine
- Motorola i1, a smartphone by Motorola
- LB&SCR I1 class, a 1906 British class of 4-4-2 steam tank locomotives
- Polikarpov I-1, a 1923 Soviet monoplane fighter
- I1, a rank-into-rank axiom in mathematical set theory

== See also ==
- 1I (disambiguation)
