= Paranoia Excessory Pack =

Tabletop role-playing game supplement

Paranoia Excessory Pack is a 1987 role-playing game supplement for Paranoia published by West End Games.

== Contents ==
Paranoia Excessory Pack is a supplement which provides three copies of the following forms in triplicate with carbon paper: the R&D Experimental Equipment report form, the Equipment/Weapon/Vehicle request Form, and the Accusation of Treason/Termination Voucher Request Form.

== Reception ==
Richard A. Edwards reviewed Paranoia Excessory Pack in Space Gamer/Fantasy Gamer No. 81. Edwards commented that "I think West End has given us a selection of gimmicks for which no GM will hold off on obtaining, but I wish they would have included an adventure, a mini-adventure even, to make me feel like I was getting more for my money than some extra copies of forms."

== Reviews ==
- Dragon #132
