= Don't Take Your Laser to Town =

Don't Take Your Laser to Town is an adventure published by West End Games in 1988 for the light-hearted dystopian post-apocalyptic science fiction role-playing game Paranoia.

== Publication history ==
Don't Take Your Laser to Town is a 32-page book that was written by Malcolm Mouris and Vern C. Hargett, and published by West End Games in 1988.

== Plot summary ==
Don't Take Your Laser to Town is an adventure scenario intended for Yellow Clearance troubleshooters (player characters) that takes place in the WST Sector, where the outlaw Black Bot menaces the townsfolk; the adventure uses many cliches and historical personalities of the Wild West genre.

== Reception ==
In the April 1989 edition of Dragon (Issue #144), Jim Bambra called this a "fast-moving adventure that fairly rips along", but noted that "at times it moves too fast for its own good, with staging and GM tips suffering slightly in the process." Bambra thought it was "a fun supplement, but it lacks the unique charm which characterized earlier Paranoia adventures." He concluded, "While not first class, Don't Take Your Laser to Town will certainly keep your clones amused."

In the 2007 book Designers & Dragons: The '80s, Shannon Applecline commented that this was one of the final Paranoia adventures to do well commercially, saying, "Though some post-Rolston releases like the pre-crash Don't Take Your Laser to Town (1988) and the time travel Alice through the Mirrorshades did well commercially, the uneven humor of the early '90s and the metaplot issues would eventually doom the [Paranoia] line."
