= The Paranoia Complex =

1989 unlicensed video game

- Publisher: Gremlin Graphics
- Platforms: Amiga, Amstrad CPC, Commodore 64, ZX Spectrum
- Release: 1989
- Genre: Role-playing

The Paranoia Complex is an unlicensed video game based on the pen and paper role-playing game Paranoia. It was released in 1989 by Magic Bytes for Amiga, Amstrad CPC, Commodore 64 and ZX Spectrum. It takes the form of a top-down maze shooter and reviews at the time pegged it as mediocre to poor.

It was re-released in 1990 under the title "Cyber World". with certain terms changed to no longer match the pen-and-paper game, and imagery of electric chairs (which did not appear in the pen-and-paper game) removed.

The player is required to move around a maze using a stun gun to apprehend "traitors", while attempting to arrange their own escape. At regular intervals the character is forced to answer yes/no questions to demonstrate loyalty and submissiveness to the regime.
