= Glory to Rome =

2005 card-based board game

Glory to Rome is a 2005 card-based board game designed by Ed Carter and Carl Chudyk and published by Cambridge Games. It received positive reviews, but in 2010s it became infamous due to being out of print which led to greatly inflated prices in the secondary market.

== Gameplay ==
Glory to Rome is a card-based resource management game, with a theme of rebuilding the city of Rome in the aftermath of the Great Fire. The game used a novel mechanic of multi-purpose cards which can be used to lead actions or as various types of resources.

== History ==
The game was first published in 2005. It received a second English edition in 2007 and a third in 2010, as well as several translations (Polish, German, Italian, Spanish, French and Hungarian in 2011). However, the fourth 2012 English edition, successfully crowdfunded on Kickstarter, was badly mismanaged, resulting in the publisher going bankrupt and the Kickstarter project suffering major delays. Subsequently, due to the company's unclear legal status, the game, despite its ongoing popularity, was not reprinted in English. This has caused the out-of-print English editions of the game to rise in price, and copies of the game were reported as selling for over $300 on the secondary market (several times the game's original price). The English publishing debacle did not affect some reprints of foreign translations, licensed to different companies, and some reviewers and fans even suggested that desperate customers may want to acquire a foreign edition and modify it with English text. One journalist summed up the game's history as "A glorious game; a terrible Kickstarter horror story".

Many of Glory to Rome mechanics have been reimplemented in the 2015 Buddhist temple-themed game by Chudyk, Mottainai.

== Reviews and reception ==
The first edition received generally good reviews and became highly popular, ranking for many years in the Top 150 most popular board games (however, according to the popularity list maintained by the BoardGameGeek portal; it has dropped to Top 200 by early 2021). Many reviewers and journalists writing about the game referred to it in superlatives such as "glorious" and "beloved".
