= Eric Goldberg (game designer) =

American game designer

- Occupation: Game designer

Eric Goldberg is an American game designer who has worked primarily on role-playing games.

== Career ==
Eric Goldberg designed Commando, a man-to-man game of tactical combat which also included systems for character creation and skills, published by Simulations Publications, Incorporated (SPI). Goldberg also designed DragonQuest (1980), the largest role-playing game from SPI. Goldberg also contributed to Thieves' World (1981) from Chaosium. Goldberg had been friends with Greg Costikyan for years and also worked at SPI with him, and they talked to Dan Gelber about making a professional game out of the role-playing game design that Gelber called "Paranoia" and ran for his local game group. Gelber gave Goldberg and Costikyan his notes and they developed those ideas into a full manuscript for an RPG. During his time working at SPI, Goldberg also designed Eric Goldberg's KURSK which was subsequently published in 1980; this project was the 2nd Edition of SPI's original KURSK game (1971). Goldberg started working for West End Games in 1983 as its new Vice President of Research & Development. Gelber, Costikyan, and Goldberg were therefore able to license their Paranoia game to West End Games, and Ken Rolston helped rewrite the rules before it was published in 1984. Goldberg designed Tales of the Arabian Nights (1985) for West End, a storytelling board game based on written paragraphs.

Costikyan and Goldberg left West End Games in January 1987, forming the short-lived game company Goldberg Associates. West End Games declared bankruptcy in 1998, so Costikyan and Goldberg tried to recover the rights to Paranoia but West End Games founder Scott Palter resisted, and a judge gave the rights back to the creators in 2000. Costikyan and Goldberg licensed Paranoia to Mongoose Publishing, which began producing new books for the game in 2004. In writing the new edition called Paranoia XP, Varney, Goldberg and Costikyan reached out to and actively collaborated with Paranoia's online fan community through an official blog and through Paranoia-Live.net.

In 2019, Goldberg and Raph Koster founded a new company, Playable Worlds, and are currently developing the MMO Stars Reach.
