= Fairy Tale (game) =

Card game

- Designers: Satoshi Nakamura
- Illustrators: Yoko Nachigami
- Publishers: Z-man
- Players: 2-5
- Playing time: 10-30 minutes
- Skills: drafting, strategy

Fairy Tale is a non-collectible card drafting game originally released in Japan where it was nominated for a Japan Boardgame Prize in 2005. It is printed in North America by Z-Man Games.

== Gameplay ==
The game is played in four rounds with each round being played out in the same manner.

Each person is dealt a hand of five cards, then drafting occurs. When drafting each person chooses one card from their hand to keep and then passes the remaining four to their left and their neighbor does the same. This continues until everyone has five cards that they kept.

Next, each player simultaneously chooses one of their five cards, places it face down, then all cards are revealed simultaneously and "Hunt", "unflip", and "Flip" effects take place in that order (most cards have none of these abilities).

Hunt: Causes cards played in the same round to immediately be flipped face-down without their abilities taking effect. This type of card can only be found in expert rules.

Unflip: Allows a player to flip one of their face-down cards face-up. May be specific to a certain type of card.

Flip: Causes the player or all players (as specified on the card) to flip certain cards face-down.

The objective of the game is to keep one's cards face-up, which will give points to the player at the end of each round. A round ends when each player has played three cards, where the other two are discarded.

The game ends when four rounds have been played and the players' score are calculated. The winner is the player with the most points.

== Artwork ==
All artwork was done by Mariano Iannelli, Yoko Nachigami, and Satoshi Nakamura. The artwork is noted for its anime style and bright pastel colors.

== Release ==
Fairy Tale comes packaged in a box with two complete decks and contains 100 Cards (split into two decks/84 colored cards/16 black cards) and an instruction sheet.

The first edition was printed in 2005 and a Second edition was printed in 2008 in North America.

== Reception ==
The game has been praised for its simplicity and easily learned gameplay. It is light and small enough to take on the go and can be played on any flat surface without taking up space. Its artwork has been praised but its light tone and white text have been criticized for being hard to see and indistinguishable against equally light colored cards (except for the black).
