= ChiZo Rising =

Collectable tile game

- Publishers: Temple Games
- Players: Two to Four
- Setup time: < 2 minutes
- Playing time: ~ 30 minutes
- Chance: Some
- Age range: 8 and up
- Skills: Card playing Arithmetic

ChiZo Rising is a collectable tile game that combines the elements of a collectable game with a German-style board game. The game’s name is created by shortening the words Chinese zodiac to ‘ChiZo’. The Chinese zodiac is the inspiration for the game’s theme and gameplay.
