= PMIP =

PMIP may refer to:

- Paleoclimate Modelling Intercomparison Project
- Pan-Malaysian Islamic Party
- Pathology Messaging Implementation Project
- Proxy Mobile IPv6
