= Crash Course Manual =

Crash Course Manual is a 1989 role-playing game supplement for Paranoia published by West End Games.

== Contents ==
Crash Course Manual is a supplement in which the Computer has crashed in the Alpha Complex.

== Publication history ==
Crash Course Manual was edited by Doug Kaufman, with a cover by Robert Larkin, and was published by West End Games in 1990 as a 96-page book.

Shannon Appelcline commented that metaplots for Paranoia "kicked off with the 'Secret Society Wars' in The DOA Sector Travelogue (1989), which seemed OK, but then things took a dramatic wrong turn with Crash Course Manual (1989), which introduced MegaWhoops Alpha Complex where the Computer was gone!"

== Reception ==
James Wallis reviewed Crash Course Manual for Games International magazine, and gave it a rating of 3 out of 10, and stated that "If you still play Paranoia, you'll want this, but if your copy is gathering dust on a shelf, Crash Course Manual is not a good enough reason to pick it up again."
