= Paranoia Mandatory Bonus Fun! Card Game =

Custom card game

Cover art by Jim Holloway, 2005

Paranoia Mandatory Bonus Fun! Card Game was the first card game published by Mongoose Publishing in 2005, and is based on the Paranoia role-playing game.

== Description ==
Paranoia Mandatory Bonus Fun! Card Game, set in the Alpha Complex world of the Paranoia role-playing game, is designed for 3 to 8 players, and uses a custom 150-card deck as well as wound and treason tokens. Each player starts with a "Troubleshooter" of the lowest security clearance rank, Red. Troubleshooters are sent out on missions that frequently turn out to be lethal, and Troubleshooters can also accumulate Treason tokens, which can lead to summary execution. For this reason, players are given six clone cards to use to replace a dead Troubleshooter. After completing missions, Troubleshooters may be promoted to the next higher security clearance.

=== Victory conditions ===
When any player has to lose their sixth and last clone card, the Troubleshooter with the highest security clearance wins the game.

== Publication history ==
The dystopian role-playing game Paranoia was first published by West End Games in 1984, and quickly gained a following. When West End Games went bankrupt, the rights to the role-playing game were acquired by Mongoose Publishing, who published a new edition in 2004.

The following year, Mongoose came out with their first card game, Paranoia Mandatory Bonus Fun Card Game, designed by Steve Gilbert and Gareth Hanrahan, and illustrated by Jim Holloway. The game was not a bestseller for Mongoose, who later admitted, "It [did] okay, but [was] not really in a market we knew as well as we should have done."

== Reception ==
The game was reviewed in the online second volume of Pyramid.

Leeman Kessler called this "a fast-paced, no prep, stripped down version of the experience one gets while playing the RPG." Kessler noted the inherent non-cooperative aspect of the game, writing, "Much like Munchkin, the game nominally has the players on the same team but if one player does too well, it behooves the rest to tackle him to the ground. This creates a nice level of tension where each players wants to do well but not Too well lest they be blasted into a greasy smear." Kessler concluded, "the game moves at a decent clip and requires a healthy ego and sense of humour to not get to upset when people start teaming up against you. Betrayal is necessary and encouraged and the game does a good job of keeping everything just ridiculous enough that no-one should start crossing their arms and making a harrumph face."

== Awards ==
At the 2005 Origins Award, Paranoia Mandatory Bonus Fun! Card Game won "Gamer's Choice Best Traditional Card Game of the Year."
