= Australia (board game) =

2005 board game

- Players: 2–5
- Setup time: < 1 min
- Playing time: About 90 minutes
- Chance: Medium
- Age range: 10 +
- Skills: Dice rolling, Political strategy.

Australia: Aufbruch ins Abenteuer (English title: Australia: Depart for the Adventure of Lifetime) is a family board game published by Ravensburger in 2005 that simulates national development in Australia in the 1920s.

== Description ==
Australia is a game for 2–5 players aged 10 or older, each of whom takes on the role of a politician in Australia in the 1920s who is trying to set up national parks but also kickstart the nation's industrial base. Each politician controls a group of Rangers and directs them to take on various conservation and industrialisation projects.

=== Setup ===
Each player receives an airplane, one or more Rangers (number depends on the number of players), a player board that lists possible actions, and two cards from the shuffled deck. Industrialisation tiles and conservation tiles are randomly placed in each of the 24 regions, the conservation tiles facedown.

=== Gameplay ===
On their turn, each player can do two of three things:

- Fly to a region and turn over the industrialisation tile, revealing the number of rangers required to industrialise the region
- Play a card to collect money and/or place Ranger(s) in a region
- Move up to four Rangers off the board (back to Supply)

=== Collecting points ===
- Conservation: When a region is completely surrounded on its borders by Rangers, it becomes a national park. Each player scores 1 point for each of their Rangers on the border, or 2 points if this is a port. The player who placed the final Ranger scores a bonus 3 points.
- Industrialisation: When the required number of Rangers is placed in an industrial project (defined by the number of the industry tile in the region), then each player scores 1 point for each of their Rangers in the region, or 2 points if this is a port. The player who placed the final Ranger scores a bonus 3 points.

=== Advanced game ===
When an industry counter displaying the windmill symbol is revealed, the windmill is moved to another region, and adds 1 point to its own value. When a region is scored, the nature or industry counter is moved to the Windmill Track. When the Windmill Track is filled with counters, a special Windmill Scoring Round takes place — the player able to move the most Rangers onto a special Ranger Track scores the number of points the Windmill is worth.

=== Victory conditions ===
The game ends when the deck of cards is exhausted and then a player runs out of cards. At that point each player adds any remaining dollars they have to their Points score. The player with the highest score is the winner.

== Publication history ==
Australia was designed by Wolfgang Kramer and Michael Kiesling, and was published by Ravensburger in 2005. It was also published by Rio Grande Games.

== Reception ==
Writing for Lautapeliopas (Board Game Guide), Mikko Saari thought this game worked best with three players, "when the game has some semblance of control." He noted that many players prefer to play the Basic game without the extra randomness introduced by the Windmill. He also warned that games could take longer than the advertised "60–90 minutes", saying, "You should be prepared to wait for your turn for a long time, especially if one of the players is prone to analysis paralysis."

Rick Heli, writing for Spotlight on Games, felt the rules were too constraining, commenting "I kept seeing perfect moves without having the chance to do anything about them." Heli also found the Windmill favoured those who happened to be close to it. He concluded that the game seemed to be tailored to a particular type of player, saying, "Overall, I think Australia will be best appreciated by those who play with flair, who love to plan in detail and pull off a dramatic power play because frequently a single move can set off a chain reaction of scoring."

The Dutch website Bordspelmania (Board Game Mania) rated this game a 4 out of 10 for Luck and 6 out of 10 for strategy, and gave it an average overall score of 6.3 out of 10, saying, "Good planning, surprising tactics and flexibility keep your opponents at a safe distance."

Claudia Schlee and Andreas Keirat, writing for the German site Spielphase, thought "The game is well thought out and fun in every aspect." They agreed that luck played a part in the game, "but since there are hardly any regions that are not scored, this is put into perspective sooner or later in the scores." They concluded by rating the game 5 out of 6, calling it a "beautiful and well thought-out game."

Beate Fixl, writing for the Austrian site Spieltest, called it, "All in all a nice game and nice components," but she noted that due to the lack of player interaction, there are games better suited for tacticians "and those who like to thwart other players. [...] You cannot influence your opponent's moves, but you can forestall them." She felt the optimal number of players was 3 because "with increasing number of players Australia becomes more and more abstract and the waiting times increase."

== Awards ==
- In 2006, Games Magazine named Australia its "Game of the Year"
- Australia was a finalist for the 2005 Nederlandse Spellenprijs
- It was also a finalist for a 2005 Japan Boardgame Prize in the category "Foreign Game for Advanced Players"
