= Infinity (wargame) =

Tabletop wargame

Infinity the Game
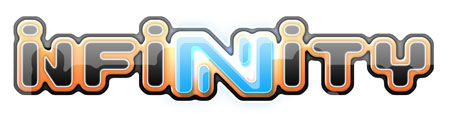
- Current Infinity the Game logo
- Manufacturers: Corvus Belli
- Designers: Gutier Lusquiños Rodríguez, Alberto Abal, Fernando Liste and Carlos Torres
- Publishers: Corvus Belli
- Years active: 2005 to present
- Genres: Wargaming
- Players: 2+
- Website: www.infinitytheuniverse.com/games/infinity

Infinity (also known as Infinity the Game) is a tabletop miniature wargame with 28mm scale metal miniatures that simulates combat and special operations in a Science fiction environment created by Gutier Lusquiños Rodríguez, Alberto Abal, Fernando Liste and Carlos Torres of Corvus Belli. The games aesthetics are largely inspired by Manga, particularly the work of Masamune Shirow.

Each player controls a set of miniatures to represent soldiers on a tabletop battlefield, taking actions during play to achieve their set goals and prevent their opponent from achieving theirs, while also seeking to destroy their opponent's soldiers.

== Setting ==
Infinity is set in a richly detailed and expansive science fiction universe that blends high-tech intrigue with deep socio-political dynamics. The game unfolds in a future where humanity has expanded across the galaxy, resulting in a diverse and complex array of factions, each with its own unique characteristics and motivations.

=== The Human Sphere ===
At the heart of Infinity's universe is the Human Sphere, a collection of human-controlled star systems that are the primary focus of the game. The Human Sphere is a nexus of advanced technology, political power struggles, and cultural diversity.

The Human Sphere is the relatively small region of space in which the game takes place, including just a few star systems. These include the Sol System, the Concilium System, Fareedat, Yu Jing, Dawn, and Paradiso. Much of the storyline in 2nd Edition or "N2" took place on Paradiso. This continued in N3, although the setting expanded further to Dawn, the home system of Ariadna. In N4, the storyline shifted focus primarily to the Concilium and Dawn systems.

=== Factions ===
The Human Sphere is divided into several major factions, each representing different human societies and their technological advancements.

- PanOceania: A powerful and technologically advanced superstate known for its high-tech military forces and ambitious exploration programs. Its society is marked by a blend of corporate power and democratic ideals.
- Yu Jing: A rising power with a rich cultural heritage, Yu Jing combines traditional values with cutting-edge technology. It is known for its strong military and espionage capabilities.
- Ariadna: A frontier world with a rugged and resilient populace, Ariadna's military is characterized by a mix of old-fashioned tactics and modern innovations. Its society is shaped by its history of colonization and isolation.
- Nomads: A collection of nomadic spacefaring tribes that roam the stars in massive, self-sufficient ships. The Nomads are known for their independence, technological prowess, and unorthodox methods.
- Haqqislam: A faction with a focus on cultural and scientific advancement, Haqqislam combines ancient traditions with futuristic technologies. Its society values knowledge and innovation, often engaging in high-stakes scientific and philosophical debates.
- JSA (Japanese Secessionist Army): A breakaway faction from Yu Jing, the JSA represents a powerful and autonomous military force with its own agenda. Inspired by Meiji-era Japan and corporate culture, Japan became a full faction with the release of N5.
- ALEPH: A sophisticated AI and powerful entity that controls a vast array of assets and maintains order across the Human Sphere. ALEPH's influence extends into various factions, manipulating events from behind the scenes to ensure stability and its own interests.
- Combined Army: An alien coalition dedicated to infinite expansion in order to gain more data. The Combined Army is a major antagonist force in the game, seeking to conquer and subjugate the Human Sphere using advanced technology and intense force. They are broken into sub-races, based on the numerous alien polities subsumed by the EI or "Evolved Intelligence."
- O-12: A powerful and neutral interstellar organization that acts as a diplomatic and regulatory body in the Human Sphere. O-12 strives to maintain balance and order among the factions, often acting as mediators in conflicts and enforcers of galactic laws.
- Tohaa: an advanced alien civilization in an open war with the EI and its Combined Army. Custodians of one of the greatest treasures in existence, the Tohaa have resisted the EI’s attacks for longer than any other race in the universe. Tohaa shine in the use of biotechnology, having fearsome viral weapons and tough symbiotic armors, but they are also capable of modifying other races to give them a higher intelligence and make them fight at their direction.

== Gameplay ==
Infinity is played on a game table, usually one hundred and twenty centimeters on a side, typically between two players. Each player controls a force of soldiers, called troopers, with the objective of the game being dependent on the scenario, which may be chosen from pre-designed lists, or invented by the players. Objectives could include eliminating the enemy, or accomplishing specific tasks like kidnapping a high-value target, obtaining supplies, or stealing data. Players will conduct attacks or defend their troops with various tools such as firearms, melee weaponry, hacking devices, explosives, or smoke grenades. The effects and interactions of these tools will be modified further by the skills and equipment of the troopers using them, or those being targeted by them.

=== Turn Structure ===
Once the table is set, the players start the game by deploying their miniatures and markers on the gaming table. The game is organized through a series of game rounds, each comprising two alternating player turns. During their active turn, a player generates a resource called orders, which are spent to activate their troopers, allowing them to move about the table, attack enemy troopers, and accomplish objectives. The active turn player's opponent is in their reactive turn. This player may not spend orders, but may react to the active player's actions by attacking, avoiding, or otherwise attempting to thwart their progress. Thus the active player may spend an order to move a model forward and attack an enemy trooper, with their opponent given the opportunity to attack in response, or to avoid the attack by other means.

=== Dice Rolls ===
When a dice roll is required, players roll twenty-sided dice with the goal of rolling a number equal to, or under, a success value determined by their trooper's abilities, as well as positive and negative modifiers such as weapon ranges or penalties imposed by evasive targets. When troopers attempt to affect each other, such as two troopers attacking one another, they will do so with what is called a face-to-face roll. These rolls follow rules similar to Blackjack, as the goal is to roll as high as possible without exceeding one's success value, with each player's successful rolls eliminating any of their enemy's lower valued rolls.

=== Private Information ===
Unlike most competitive tabletop miniature wargames, there are several things that a player keeps hidden from their opponent in Infinity. For example, many troopers are represented by a "camouflage marker" instead of a miniature, with very little information about them available to the opposing player until the model is revealed by some means. Other models that do not deploy at the beginning of the game, such as paratroopers, are not publicly revealed the opponents.

=== Terrain ===
Another important aspect of Infinity is the significance of terrain to provide cover for miniatures, which gives a bonus to their armor statistic and a negative to the opponents rolls to hit. Terrain is also necessary to hamper longer range weapons such as sniper rifles. This can require significantly more physical terrain on a board than other wargames, and boards frequently resemble dense cities.

The importance of terrain has led to Corvus Belli making partnerships with several third-party companies to create official terrain for Infinity.

== The Infinity Tournament System ==
Corvus Belli operates the Infinity Tournament System, which facilitates the hosting and participation of tournaments by players. Players are capable of arranging their own tournaments using an online portal to assist in tracking the results of the matches. This is accomplished with publicly purchasable packs containing both a single-use access code to this online system, as well as various prizes for participants. The results of each tournament are then included in an online database where the results are used to rank the participants against players around the world.

== Reception ==
In Issue 19 of The Ancible, Robey Jenkins noted, "it is Infinity's force-building philosophy that is its most radical ... Their philosophy – within fairly broad parameters – is 'pick the miniatures you like and then play with them'. Some armies are harder to master the use of than others, but all armies can be potential winners. It makes for a highly dynamic play environment." Jenkins also noted the action pool mechanic, the reactions system and the critical hit mechanic, commenting "none of [these] are original or innovative but [they] are combined in a way that makes the game especially appealing to serving and former military personnel for the way it replicates the unpredictable and dangerous environment of real-life urban warfare."

In 2013 popular wargaming hobby site Beasts Of War ran an Infinity Week, featuring videos and articles on how to start playing and previews of new products, along with interviews with the creators of the game. In 2014, Beasts of War ran an Infinity 3rd Edition Week, promoting the upcoming new edition of the game. In 2016, Beasts of War ran an "Infinity: Human Sphere N3 Week", featuring interviews with Carlos Llauger (Bostria) and demo games spotlighting updated rules.

Military.com published a spotlight article on Infinity explaining the game setting and gameplay features for their readership

Starting with the release of N4 in 2021, the game's popularity increased. Infinity was featured on more mainstream gaming news websites like Polygon.com.

In late 2024, an animated series by LEX+OTIS was teased.

The fifth edition of the game N5, has a planned 2024 released.
