= Wargods of Ægyptus =

Tabletop combat game

Cover of the 1st edition, 2001

War Gods of Ægyptus is a tabletop combat game published by Crocodile Games in 2001 that uses armies of collectible metal miniatures.

== Description ==
War Gods of Æegyptus is a set of rules for tabletop miniatures combat set in a pseudo-historical Bronze Age Egypt. Players collect and paint miniatures that correspond to the combatants listed in the book and then use the figures to fight tabletop battles.

Using a point-buy system, each player creates an army from lists in the book that represents one of the gods of Ægyptus: Anubis, Bast, Horus, Set, Ptah, Khanum, Sobek, Thoth, Isis or Osiris. Each army is led by a Harbinger, who has been given a particular gift from their god.

=== Setting ===
Battles are set in the Antediluvian Age after the fall of Atlantis and before the Great Flood.

=== Gameplay ===
Once armies have been set up on the tabletop according to the scenario, combat uses an orders system, where players place orders facedown for each army unit. The players roll for initiative, and the winner can activate 1–3 units, which can be their own or their opponent's. Orders for the activated units are then revealed, and the actions are taken.

=== Campaign game ===
A campaign game allows the players to increase the powers of their Harbingers and armies with each victory.

== Publication history ==
Wargods of Ægyptus is a 220-page book designed by Chris Fitzpatrick and Allen Thomas and published by Crocodile Games in 2001 at the same time as 25 mm metal miniatures of all of the combatants mentioned in the book were offered for sale so that players could then collect and paint for them use with the game rules. Crocodile published a revised second edition of the book in 2002.

In 2007, Crocodile released Wargods of Olympus that added Greek gods, mythological beasts and armies to the combat system.

== Reception ==
At the 2006 Origins Awards, Wargods of Ægyptus won "Miniatures of the Year".

== Reviews ==
- Backstab #34
- Backstab #48
