= Kruzno (board game) =

Strategy board game

Kruzno is a two-player abstract strategy board game played on a hexagonal board, first published in 2005 by the company of the same name.

== Gameplay ==
In the most common variant of the game, players start with nine pieces each (three rooks, three knights and three bishops). Though the game is played with chess pieces it is actually a variant of hexagonal checkers, albeit with three unusual features.

The first of these is intransitive capturing – rooks capture knights, knights capture bishops and bishops capture rooks. This is somewhat similar to Stephen Addison's Breakthrough where commanders capture generals, generals capture majors and majors capture commanders.

The second unusual feature is jumping without capturing. Like in checkers, a piece can either move one space or can make a series of jumps, but unlike checkers a piece can jump (but not capture) other pieces on its own side and opponent pieces of its own type. For example, a black rook could jump and capture a white knight and could jump but not capture a white rook, a black knight, a black bishop or another black rook. In other words, a piece can jump any piece that cannot capture it.

The third feature is a limitation on moves in the perimeter. If a piece moves onto the outer ring of hexagons, it must move back toward the center on the next turn unless blocked from doing so.

== See also ==
- Draughts
