= HIL Sector Blues =

Role-playing game supplement

HIL Sector Blues is a 1986 role-playing game supplement for Paranoia published by West End Games.

== Contents ==
HIL Sector Blues is a campaign supplement in which the player characters are blue-level and function as Internal Security Troopers.

== Reception ==
Marc Gascoigne reviewed HIL Sector Blues for White Dwarf #86, and stated that "you've got a package that will provide you and your players with a lot of entertainment – over and over again!"

J. Michael Caparula reviewed HIL Sector Blues in Space Gamer/Fantasy Gamer No. 79. Caparula commented that "In the end, this mixed bag is just that, a mixed bag."

== Reviews ==
- Jeux & Stratégie #52 (as "Les Bleus du Secteur MIT")
