= The Paranoia Sourcebook =

The Paranoia Sourcebook is a 1992 role-playing supplement for Paranoia published by West End Games.

== Contents ==
The Paranoia Sourcebook is a supplement in which the Computer has returned in a new form.

== Publication history ==
Shannon Appelcline noted that "The computer was 'rebooted' in The Paranoia Sourcebook (1992) but by now the line had spun wildly out of control and was almost unrecognizable. Though some later releases like the pre-crash Don't Take Your Laser to Town (1988) and Alice through the Mirrorshades itself did well commercially, the uneven humour of the early '90s and the metaplot issues would eventually doom the line."

== Reception ==
S. John Ross reviewed The Paranoia Sourcebook in White Wolf #32 (July/Aug., 1992), rating it a 2 out of 5 and stated that "is it a good game? To be certain, it is less intelligent than the old Paranoia. West End is clearly aiming for a much younger and more general market. They seem willing to sacrifice a lot of smart comedy to acquire that market."

== Reviews ==
- Dragon (Issue 183 - Jul 1992)
