= Terakh =

- Designers: Terence Wong; Akhil Patel
- Publishers: Stoneplay
- Years active: 2005–present
- Genres: Abstract board game
- Players: 2–6
- Setup time: 5–10 minutes
- Playing time: 15 mins – 2 hours
- Chance: Medium (dice rolling, card drawing)
- Skills: Strategy, tactics

Terakh is a board game produced by Stoneplay and originally released in 2005. The game is named after its Canadian inventors Terence Wong and Akhil Patel.

Terkah is a turn-based game for two to six players. The game is played on a variable board composed of triangularly shaped panels pieced together by players. Each panel contains sixteen triangular tiles. When combined, the board serves as a battlefield upon which players combat one another's troops, relying on a combination of strategies and elements of luck. Each troop is made up of six units and a leader. The primary objective of the game is to "be the last to remain", or, to have the strongest leader standing, and in doing so, eliminating all other leaders controlled by opponents.

== History ==
The history of Terakh dates back to 1999, when Wong first began conceptualizing the game. Since Terakh's release in 2005, several revisions of the manual have been made available.

== Equipment ==
- Six triangular panels (Battle Planes): Each panel has 16 triangular tiles. Some of these tiles are marked with runes.
- Six colored sets of six game pieces (Inkas): Each piece is double-sided. There is a Guard symbol on one side, and a Ready symbol on another.
- Six marked chips (Orbs): Each Orb has a color that matches one of the 6 colored sets. These are to be placed on top of game pieces.
- Six Spec Cards: Each Spec Card corresponds to one colored Orb. These Spec Cards describe the capabilities of 6 different characters; they are: Guardian (blue), Hydra (red), Keeper (yellow), Ranger (green), Shade (grey) and Sorceress (purple).
- Twenty-four rubber bands (Mods): A-mods are red; D-mods are black. They are to be attached to character pieces (i.e. game pieces with an Orb on top) as attack strength and defence strength endowment indicators.
- Six four-sided dice (D4, Elder): To be used as game pieces.
- Six eight-sided dice (D8): To be used for rolling.
- Five mana stones: Currency for energy expenditure. To be used when accounting for the cost of actions.
- Seventy-two Cast Cards: Some cards contain runic symbols that correspond to those printed on the tiles of the Battle Planes.

== Setup ==
1. Piece together as many triangular panels as there are players to construct a game board, in any configuration with at least one edge of a panel adjoining another.
2. Place the deck of Cast Cards face-down after shuffling.
3. Each player chooses a colored set with 6 double-sided game pieces, 1 eight-sided die (D8), 1 four-sided die (D4), 1 Orb and 1 Spec Card that corresponds to the Orb.
4. Taking turns, each player places a game piece on a vacant tile, with the Guard side facing up, until all 6 pieces have been placed on the game board.
5. Each player places his Orb on one of his game pieces.
6. Each player places his four-sided die (D4) on a vacant tile, with the number 4 showing at the top.

== Play overview ==
The tetrahedron piece (D4) is called an Elder. He is the leader of a player's troop. The objective of the game is for players to protect their Elders from being attacked. The D4 serves as an endurance indicator for the Elder. Starting with 4 Hit Points (HP), 1 HP is taken off for each time that the Elder has been successfully attacked. A player is eliminated from game play when his Elder has lost all 4 HPs. The player with his Elder remaining, after having defeated all other Elders controlled by opponents, is the winner.

Each player deploys his game pieces to protect the Elder, in a manner similar to pawns serving to divert attackers from checkmating their king in a game of chess. Game pieces are called Inkas. An Inka can acquire a special Orb to augment his abilities. There are 6 different kinds of Orbs. Each Orb gives its holder a unique set of capabilities. Upon acquisition of an Orb, an Inka is said to have been transformed into an Idol, who could be one of these characters (depending on the color of the Orb): Guardian, Hydra, Keeper, Ranger, Shade or Sorceress. An Idol's ability to attack or defend is endowed after he himself or a member of his troop (i.e. Inka or Elder) has declared and won a combat.

Players roll an eight-sided die (D8) to generate scores for each attack or defence. These scores are modified according to the characteristics of the units involved in the combat to determine the ultimate strengths of the attack or defence. Victory is achieved when the attack strength is greater than the defence strength. The defeated game piece is taken off the game board.

Strength table
Unit type	Attack strength	Defence strength
Inka (Ready)	D8 score	D8 score
Inka (Guard)	D8 score - 1	D8 score + 1
Elder	D8 score - 2	D8 score + 2
Idol	D8 score + A-mod(s)	D8 score + D-mod(s)

== Game mechanics ==
At the beginning of each round, each player rolls his D8. The highest roller tosses the Direction Coin, and draws 1 Cast Card from the top of the deck. The player sitting next to him in the direction indicated by the Direction Coin will draw 1 Cast Card next, followed by the next player, and so on. After all the players have drawn 1 Cast Card each, the highest roller will begin his turn. Players will take their turns in the same order as they have drawn their Cast Cards. A round is completed when each player has taken his turn.

== Player turn ==
At the start of each turn, a player is given 5 mana stones. Mana stones are currencies for energy expenditure. There are 7 actions available to the player during his turn. Each action costs 0 to 2 mana stones. A player may perform as many actions as he wishes during his turn, in any combination and order he chooses to perform them, for as long as he has sufficient mana stones to pay for the actions. His turn is over when he declares that he has no more actions to perform. It is not necessary for the player to use up all 5 mana stones. Any unused mana stones will be forfeited at the completion of the player's turn.

Making a move (Cost: 1 mana stone)
Each game piece or D4 piece (Elder) can move onto an adjacent tile provided that there is no other game piece or D4 piece (Elder) already occupying the space. Game pieces with an Orb resting on them (Idols) may have special move privileges according to the Orb's corresponding Spec Card. Game pieces may jump from one specially marked portal (located at the center of each panel) to another on a different panel as a legitimate move.

Using a Cast Card (Cost: 0 mana stone)
A player can use any Cast Cards in his hand at any time during his turn (provided that the conditions specified on the Cast Card are met at the time of casting).

Rotating a panel (Cost: 2 mana stones)
The player's D4 piece (Elder) must be on the panel that he wishes to rotate. The panel can be rotated in any direction as long as the configuration of the game board remains the same.

Flipping a game piece (Cost: 1 mana stone)
Each game piece (Inka) is double-sided. It has a Guard side and a Ready side. A player can flip any game piece under his control to signify its change from one mode to another.

Acquiring an Orb (Cost: 1 mana stone)
If a player's game piece is resting on a tile with an Orb (of any color), he has the choice to acquire that Orb by picking it up and placing it on that game piece. He will also take with him the Spec Card that corresponds to that Orb.

Declaring a combat (Cost: 2 mana stones)
A player can declare an attack on an opponent's game piece or D4 piece (Elder) that is adjacent to a game piece or D4 piece (Elder) under his control. A game piece with an Orb on it (Idol) may have special combat powers according to the Spec Card. First, the player needs to declare which units are involved in the combat. Then, he and his opponent will roll their D8s to generate scores of the attack and defence, respectively, which are modified according to the characteristics of the game pieces involved, in order to determine the ultimate attack and defence strengths.

Reviving a game piece (Cost: 2 mana stones)
Following a combat, defeated game pieces are taken off the game board. A player can revive a game piece during his turn by placing it on a specially marked tile as long as the space is not occupied. The revived game piece (Inka) can start with either Guard-side up or Ready-side up.

== Rules ==
- A player must reveal his Cast Card when he decides to use it and return it to the bottom of the deck afterwards.
- If a Cast Card has a rune image on it, the player must have at least one of his game pieces (or D4 piece) occupying a matching runic tile in order to use the Cast Card.
- An Inka or an Elder can only declare an attack on an adjacent unit. An Idol may declare attacks on units that are not adjacent to him provided that such attacks are permitted according to its corresponding Spec Card.
- In a combat, victory is achieved when the attack strength is greater than the defence strength. When the two strengths are equal, the attack is not considered victorious.
- When any members of a troop has declared and won a combat, the troop's Idol (i.e. Orb holder) may be endowed with either an A-mod or a D-mod (to be chosen by the player), until a maximum of 3 Mods have been acquired.
- When a D4 piece (Elder) has been successfully attacked, 1 HP is taken off; it is defeated when all 4 HPs are lost.
- A defeated game piece is taken off the game board.
- Upon defeat, an Idol leaves its Orb on the tile where he last stands. Any A-mods or D-mods he possesses are taken away.
- An Inka or an Elder must advance to the tile from which the defeated unit has been removed.
- An Idol remains at the same location upon successful attacks.
- An Inka may acquire an Orb whose color differs from his own, and be transformed into the corresponding Idol. In this case, the player (with this Idol) may also control Inkas of that different color. [For example, a green Inka has acquired a yellow Orb. The player with the green troop may also control yellow Inkas for as long as his green Inka holds the yellow Orb.]

== Strategies ==
- Cast cards can be used at any time (provided that the conditions specified on the card have been met) to deter an opponent's manoeuvres.
- A D4 piece (Elder) has endowed defensive power and diminished offensive power. It would be more advantageous if a player deploys other members of his troop to perform attacks.
- An Idol, with its special capabilities, makes a good candidate in combats.
- Game pieces may jump from one specially marked portal (located at the center of each panel) to another on a different panel, saving the player time and energy units required for the pieces to traverse across the game board.
- A player may choose to place his D4 piece (Elder) near the edge of a panel, and rotate the panel to shield it from potential enemies coming from an adjoining panel.

== Sources and influences ==
Chess
Each player controls a set number of pieces.
The object of the game is to checkmate the opponent's king.

Risk
There are multiple phases to a player's turn.
Attacks can only take place between two adjacent territories.

Magic: The Gathering
Cards contain spells that players can cast on their opponents.
Game play contains mystical characters such as Hydra, Sorceress and Guardian.

Dungeons & Dragons
Game play employs polyhedral dice.
Players rely on dice rolling to determine the attack and defence strengths of their characters.

Ludo (Fei Xing Qi)
When a game piece lands on a portal, it can skip to another with a matching color.
Player may bring his ousted game piece back into play at a cost.

Uno
The order of play can be clockwise or counter-clockwise, and varies often throughout the game.
Wild card exempts a player from having to play a card with a matching color.
