= Parthenon: Rise of the Aegean =

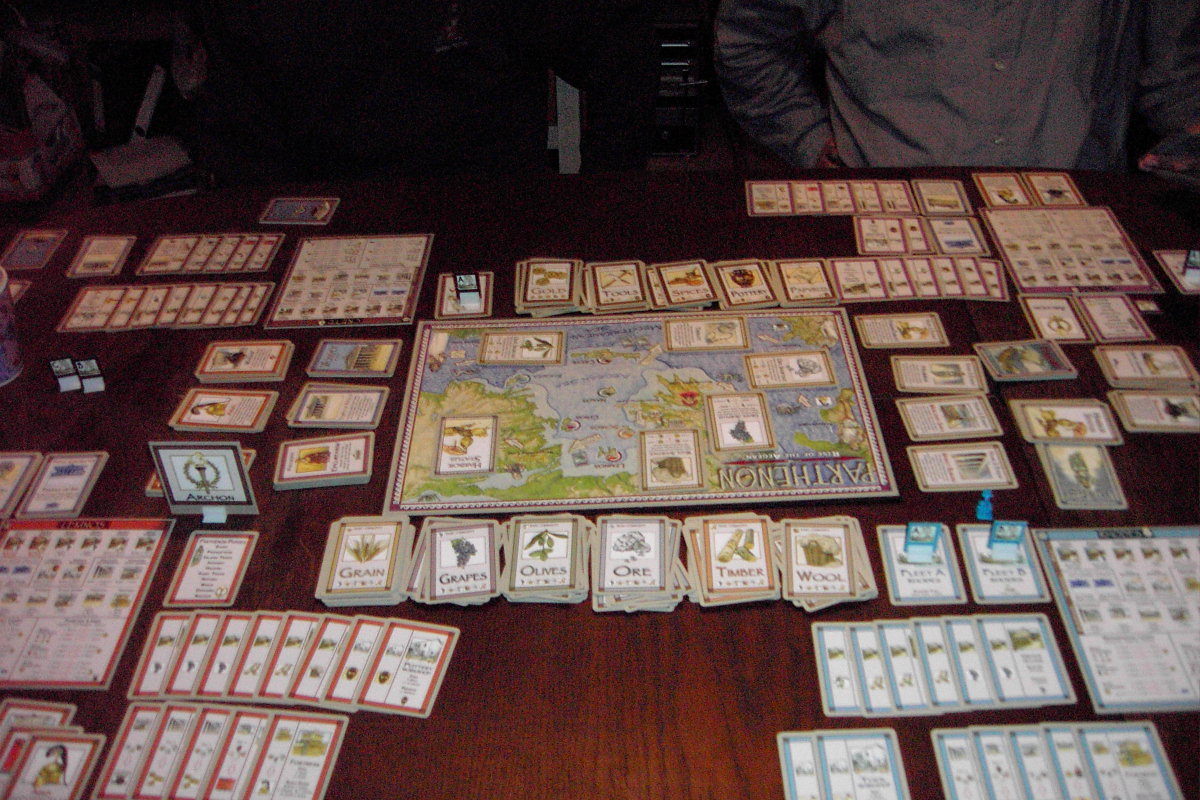
A game in progress.

Parthenon: Rise of the Aegean is a historical board game.

== Gameplay ==
Parthenon simulates commerce in the Aegean Sea around 600 B.C. 3–6 players begin with control of two villages and a fleet of ships on an island within the Aegean. Each player develops their island through trade, adding villages and structures. A game represents three years of time, and each year is divided into four seasons of ten phases. The winner is the first to complete all structures.

== Publication history ==
The game is published by Siren Bridge Publishing and Z-Man Games, Inc. It was designed by Andrew Parks and Jason Hawkins.

== Reception ==
Parthenon: Rise of the Aegean won "Board Game of the Year" during the 32nd annual Origins Award.

== Contents ==
Components include a game board, 6 reference cards, 18 counters and 440 cards.
