= Pimp: The Backhanding =

2005 card game

- Pimp: The Backhanding packaging
- Designers: J.C. Lira
- Publishers: White Wolf Publishing
- Players: 2 to 4
- Setup time: < 3 minutes
- Playing time: 60 to 90 minutes
- Chance: Some
- Age range: 18+
- Skills: Card playing Arithmetic

Pimp: The Backhanding is a card game published in 2005 by Arthaus Games, an imprint of White Wolf Publishing, as part of their One Hit Wonders line. Game design by J.C. Lira, with art by Skottie Young and Brian Glass. Pimp: The Backhanding can be played by two to four players using a single box set, as it contains all the cards and game pieces required, with the exception of dice. Release of Pimp: The Backhanding created some controversy three years after its publication over the game's subject matter by individuals from the White Wolf Publishing Community Forums who felt the game was disrespectful to women and advocated workers in the illegal sex trade industry.

The game represents a media-stereotyped passage of 1970's American pimp culture, with players assuming the roles of typecast pimps who seek consolidation of their criminal holdings and prostitutes to become the largest criminal ring in the city. Score points are symbolized as profit earned from prostitutes peddling their trade.
