= Dragons of Kir =

Strategy board game

Dragons of Kir is a 2005 strategy board game from Future Magic Games and 1i Productions. Dragons of Kir is a 2-player strategy game. The object of the game is to create systems of tiles to force one of four Dragons of Kir to destroy an opponent's war tent, while defending one's own. Tiles represent the forces of nature and of man and create a changing landscape. The battlefield is edgeless ("wraparound") for unlimited flow.

Dragons of Kir is a sequel to Darter, winner of the 2005 Origins Vanguard Innovative Game Award.

== Reception ==
Previous limited edition versions of the game came with handmade wood tiles, the version now available comes on 1/8" card stock. The rules have been modified from earlier versions for easier game play. The gameplay is described as a cross between RoboRally and Chess. Reviews of the game have been generally positive.
