= Nexus Ops =

Board game

Nexus Ops is a board game, designed by Charlie Catino and released in 2005 by Avalon Hill.

Players attempt to mine the fictitious metal "rubium" on a moon far off in space. Each player uses rubium to recruit units to mine and fight for the player. Players can employ humans, as well as fungoids, crystallines, rock striders, lava leapers, and rubium dragons. Each creature has a different attack value, and some of them have special abilities. The goal is to get 12 victory points, which are obtained by winning battles and accomplishing secret missions. The number of victory points can be changed to make for a longer or shorter game.

The board consists of three homebase hexes for each player, in addition to nineteen hexes outside of the players' homebases. The hex in the center of the board is always the "monolith" (an elevated cardboard structure) which can give a player bonuses and serves to give the game something of a king-of-the-hill flavor.

The modular board (along with randomly placed exploration tiles) serves to give the game a somewhat randomized feel, although the composition of the board tiles restricts their placement in some manners.

Fantasy Flight Games released a reprint of Nexus Ops in January 2012. The reprint contains a modified rule book which contains many new optional rules and ways to play.
