= List of Dragonlance novels =

This is a list of the published novels set in the fantasy world of Dragonlance, which was originally created as a setting for the Dungeons & Dragons tabletop role-playing game.

== Novels ==
Title	Author	Publication date	ISBN	Series	Notes
1980s
Dragons of Autumn Twilight	Margaret Weis and Tracy Hickman	November 1984	ISBN 0-88038-173-6	The Chronicles	
Dragons of Winter Night	Margaret Weis and Tracy Hickman	April 1985	ISBN 0-88038-174-4	The Chronicles	
Dragons of Spring Dawning	Margaret Weis and Tracy Hickman	November 1985	ISBN 0-88038-175-2	The Chronicles	
Time of the Twins	Margaret Weis and Tracy Hickman	February 1986	ISBN 0-7869-1804-7	Dragonlance Legends	
War of the Twins	Margaret Weis and Tracy Hickman	May 1986	ISBN 0-7869-1805-5	Dragonlance Legends	
Test of the Twins	Margaret Weis and Tracy Hickman	August 1986	ISBN 0-7869-1806-3	Dragonlance Legends	
The Legend of Huma	Richard A. Knaak	March 1988	ISBN 0-88038-548-0	Heroes	First appearance of Kaz the Minotaur whose story is continued in Kaz the Minotaur, the short story Kaz and the Dragon's Children from The Dragons of Krynn and in Land of the Minotaurs.
Stormblade	Nancy Varian Berberick	August 1988	ISBN 0-88038-597-9	Heroes	
Weasel's Luck	Michael Williams	December 1988	ISBN 0-7869-3181-7	Heroes	First appearance of Galen Pathwarden, whose story is continued in Galen Beknighted and concluded in The Oath and the Measure.
Darkness and Light	Paul B. Thompson and Tonya Carter Cook	April 1989	ISBN 0-7869-2923-5	Preludes	This series' story take place the five years before the beginning of Chronicles trilogy.
Kendermore	Mary Kirchoff	August 1989	ISBN 0-7869-2947-2	Preludes	
Brothers Majere	Kevin Stein	December 1989	ISBN 0-88038-776-9	Preludes	
1990s
Riverwind the Plainsman	Paul B. Thompson and Tonya C. Cook	January 1990	ISBN 0-7869-3009-8	Preludes	
Flint the King	Mary Kirchoff and Douglas Niles	May 1990	ISBN 0-7869-3021-7	Preludes	
Kaz the Minotaur	Richard A. Knaak	July 1990	ISBN 0-7869-3231-7	Heroes	Continues the story of Kaz the Minotaur from The Legend of Huma. The short story Kaz and the Dragon's Children from The Dragons of Krynn and the novel Land of the Minotaurs continue Kaz's story further.
The Gates of Thorbardin	Dan Parkinson	July 1990	ISBN 0-7869-3254-6	Heroes	
Tanis, the Shadow Years	Barbara Siegel and Scott Siegel	November 1990	ISBN 0-7869-3039-X	Preludes	
Galen Beknighted	Michael Williams	December 1990	ISBN 0-7869-3400-X	Heroes	Continues the story of Galen Pathwarden from Weasel's Luck. The novel The Oath and the Measure concludes Galen's story.
Firstborn	Paul B. Thompson and Tonya C. Cook	February 1991	ISBN 1-56076-051-6	Elven Nations	
Kindred Spirits	Mark Anthony and Ellen Porath	April 1991	ISBN 1-56076-069-9	Meetings Sextet	This series focuses on the first meetings of the heroes and the foundations of their friendships, and predates Preludes series.
The Kinslayer Wars	Douglas Niles	August 1991	ISBN 1-56076-113-X	Elven Nations	
Wanderlust	Mary Kirchoff and Steve Winter	September 1991	ISBN 1-56076-115-6	Meetings Sextet	
The Qualinesti	Paul B. Thompson and Tonya C. Cook	November 1991	ISBN 1-56076-114-8	Elven Nations	
Dark Heart	Tina Daniell	January 1992	ISBN 1-56076-116-4	Meetings Sextet	
The Oath and the Measure	Michael Williams	May 1992	ISBN 1-56076-336-1	Meetings Sextet	This is an indirect sequel to the other Brightblade family related novels by the same author, as it tells the tale of the last adventure of Galen Pathwarden in a flashback. It is also a prequel to the novel Darkness and Light.
Steel and Stone	Ellen Porath	September 1992	ISBN 1-56076-339-6	Meetings Sextet	
The Companions	Tina Daniell	January 1993	ISBN 1-56076-340-X	Meetings Sextet	
The Covenant of the Forge	Dan Parkinson	February 1993	ISBN 1-56076-558-5	Dwarven Nations	
Before the Mask	Michael Williams and Teri Williams	April 1993	ISBN 1-56076-583-6	Villains	
Hammer and Axe	Dan Parkinson	July 1993	ISBN 1-56076-627-1	Dwarven Nations	
The Black Wing	Mary Kirchoff	September 1993	ISBN 1-56076-650-6	Villains	
Leaves from the Inn of the Last Home	Margaret Weis and Tracy Hickman	November 1993	ISBN 0-88038-465-4	Leaves from the Inn of the Last Home	This is an expanded version of the original 1987 edition. This series serves more as sourcebooks and accessories for the role-playing game, rather than novels.
Emperor of Ansalon	Douglas Niles	December 1993	ISBN 1-56076-680-8	Villains	
The Swordsheath Scroll	Dan Parkinson	January 1994	ISBN 1-56076-686-7	Dwarven Nations	
Hederick the Theocrat	Ellen Dodge Severson	February 1994	ISBN 1-56076-817-7	Villains	
Night of the Eye	Mary Kirchoff	April 1994	ISBN 1-56076-840-1	Defenders of Magic	
Lord Toede	Jeff Grubb	July 1994	ISBN 1-56076-870-3	Villains	
The Medusa Plague	Mary Kirchoff	October 1994	ISBN 1-56076-905-X	Defenders of Magic	
The Dark Queen	Michael Williams and Teri Williams	December 1994	ISBN 1-56076-925-4	Villains	
The Kagonesti (A Story of the Wild Elves)	Douglas Niles	January 1995	ISBN 0-7869-0091-1	Lost Histories	
The Second Generation	Margaret Weis and Tracy Hickman	February 1995	ISBN 0-7869-2694-5		
Knights of the Crown	Roland J. Green	March 1995	ISBN 0-7869-0108-X	The Warriors	Knights of the Crown, Knights of the Sword, Knights of the Rose and The Wayward Knights tell a continuing story, although each novel stands on its own.
The Irda (Children of the Stars)	Linda P. Baker	June 1995	ISBN 0-7869-0138-1	Lost Histories	
Maquesta Kar-Thon	Tina Daniell	July 1995	ISBN 0-7869-0134-9	The Warriors	
The Seventh Sentinel	Mary Kirchoff	August 1995	ISBN 0-7869-0117-9	Defenders of Magic	
The Dargonesti	Paul B. Thompson and Tonya C. Cook	October 1995	ISBN 0-7869-0182-9	Lost Histories	
Dragons of Summer Flame	Margaret Weis and Tracy Hickman	November 1995	ISBN 0-7869-2708-9		
Knights of the Sword	Roland J. Green	December 1995	ISBN 0-7869-0202-7	The Warriors	Knights of the Crown, Knights of the Sword, Knights of the Rose and The Wayward Knights tell a continuing story, although each novel stands on its own.
Land of the Minotaurs	Richard A. Knaak	January 1996	ISBN 0-7869-0472-0	Lost Histories	Continues the story of Kaz the Minotaur from The Legend of Huma, Kaz the Minotaur and the short story Kaz and the Dragon's Children from The Dragons of Krynn.
Theros Ironfeld	Don Perrin	March 1996	ISBN 978-0-7869-0481-5	The Warriors	
The Gully Dwarves	Dan Parkinson	June 1996	ISBN 0-7869-0497-6	Lost Histories	Continues the short story The Promised Place from The War of the Lance. The connected short stories Off Day and Ogre Unaware from The Reign of Istar and The Cataclysm respectively serve as an indirect prelude to The Promised Place and The Gully Dwarves.
Knights of the Rose	Roland J. Green	July 1996	ISBN 0-7869-0502-6	The Warriors	Knights of the Crown, Knights of the Sword, Knights of the Rose and The Wayward Knights tell a continuing story, although each novel stands on its own.
The Dawning of a New Age	Jean Rabe	September 1996	ISBN 0-7869-2842-5	Dhamon Saga/Dragons of a New Age	The story of Dhamon Grimwulf, one of the main antagonists. The first series coincided with Dragonlance: The Fifth Age and had its logo, but it was dropped from the reprint and the second series.
The Dragons	Douglas Niles	October 1996	ISBN 0-7869-0513-1	Lost Histories	The short story Aurora's Eggs from The Dragons at War serves as a prequel to The Dragons.
The Doom Brigade	Don Perrin and Margaret Weis	November 1996	ISBN 0-7869-0785-1	Chaos War	In 2003 re-released as Volume One of the Kang's Regiment Duology.
Lord Soth	Edo Van Belkom	December 1996	ISBN 0-7869-0519-0	The Warriors	
The Day of the Tempest	Jean Rabe	August 1997	ISBN 0-7869-2857-3	Dhamon Saga/Dragons of a New Age	
Vinas Solamnus	J. Robert King	August 1997	ISBN 0-7869-0787-8	Lost Legends	
Fistandantilus Reborn	Douglas Niles	October 1997	ISBN 0-7869-0708-8	Lost Legends	
The Wayward Knights	Roland J. Green	October 1997	ISBN 0-7869-0696-0	The Warriors	Knights of the Crown, Knights of the Sword, Knights of the Rose and The Wayward Knights tell a continuing story, although each novel stands on its own.
Tales of Uncle Trapspringer	Dixie Lee McKeone	November 1997	ISBN 978-0786907755	Lost Legends	
The Soulforge	Margaret Weis	January 1998	ISBN 0-7869-1314-2	The Raistlin Chronicles	
The Eve of the Maelstrom	Jean Rabe	February 1998	ISBN 0-7869-2860-3	Dhamon Saga/Dragons of a New Age	
The Last Thane	Douglas Niles	June 1998	ISBN 0-7869-1172-7	Chaos War	
Spirit of the Wind	Chris Pierson	July 1998	ISBN 0-7869-1174-3	Bridges of Time	
Tears of the Night Sky	Linda P. Baker and Nancy Varian Berberick	October 1998	ISBN 0-7869-1185-9	Chaos War	
Legacy of Steel	Mary H. Herbert	November 1998	ISBN 0-7869-1187-5	Bridges of Time	
The Silver Stair	Jean Rabe	January 1999	ISBN 0-7869-1315-0	Bridges of Time	
The Puppet King	Douglas Niles	February 1999	ISBN 978-0-7869-1324-4	Chaos War	
The Rose and the Skull	Jeff Crook	March 1999	ISBN 0-7869-1336-3	Bridges of Time	
Reavers of the Blood Sea	Richard A. Knaak	May 1999	ISBN 0-7869-1345-2	Chaos War	This is an indirect sequel to the other minotaur related novels by the same author, as it tells the tale of a descendant of Kaz the Minotaur featured in The Legend of Huma, Kaz the Minotaur, the short story Kaz and the Dragon's Children from The Dragons of Krynn and the novel Land of the Minotaurs.
Dezra's Quest	Chris Pierson	June 1999	ISBN 0-7869-1368-1	Bridges of Time	
The Odyssey of Gilthanas (Dragonlance Reader's Companion)	Douglas Niles, Stever Miller and Steven (Stan!) Brown	July 1999	ISBN 0-7869-1446-7	Odyssey of Gilthanas	
Brothers in Arms	Don Perrin and Margaret Weis	August 1999	ISBN 0-7869-1429-7	The Raistlin Chronicles	
The Siege of Mt. Nevermind	Fergus Ryan^{t}	September 1999	ISBN 0-7869-1381-9	Chaos War	
Murder in Tarsis	John Maddox Roberts	October 1999	ISBN 0-7869-1587-0	Classics	
The Annotated Chronicles	Margaret Weis and Tracy Hickman	December 1999	ISBN 0-7869-1870-5	The Chronicles	New edition
2000s
Dalamar the Dark	Nancy Varian Berberick	January 2000	ISBN 0-7869-1565-X	Classics	
Dragons of a Fallen Sun	Margaret Weis and Tracy Hickman	April 2000	ISBN 0-7869-1807-1	The War of Souls	
More Leaves from the Inn of the Last Home	Margaret Weis and Tracy Hickman	June 2000	ISBN 0-7869-1516-1	Leaves from the Inn of the Last Home	
The Clandestine Circle	Mary H. Herbert	July 2000	ISBN 0-7869-1610-9	Crossroads	The story of Linsha Majere continues in The Linsha Trilogy and the short story The Eight from Dragons of Time.
The Citadel	Richard A. Knaak	August 2000	ISBN 0-7869-1683-4	Classics	
Children of the Plains	Tonya C. Cook and Paul B. Thompson	September 2000	ISBN 0-7869-1391-6	Barbarians	
Bertrem's Guide to the Age of Mortals	Nancy Varian Berberick, Paul B. Thompson and Steven (Stan!) Brown	October 2000	ISBN 0-7869-1437-8	Bertrem's Guide	
Draconian Measures	Don Perrin and Margaret Weis	November 2000	ISBN 0-7869-1678-8	Kang's Regiment	
The Thieves' Guild	Jeff Crook	December 2000	ISBN 0-7869-1681-8	Crossroads	
The Messenger	Douglas Niles	February 2001	ISBN 0-7869-1571-4	Icewall	
Downfall	Jean Rabe	March 2001	ISBN 0-7869-1814-4	Dhamon Saga/Dragons of a New Age	
Dragons of a Lost Star	Margaret Weis and Tracy Hickman	April 2001	ISBN 0-7869-2706-2	The War of Souls	
The Inheritance	Nancy Varian Berberick	May 2001	ISBN 0-7869-1861-6	Classics	
Dragon's Bluff	Mary H. Herbert	July 2001	ISBN 0-7869-1877-2	Crossroads	
Brother of the Dragon	Tonya C. Cook and Paul B. Thompson	August 2001	ISBN 978-0-7869-1873-7	Barbarians	
Bertrem's Guide to the War of Souls, Volume One	Jeff Crook, Mary H. Herbert, Nancy Varian Berberick, and John Grubber	September 2001	ISBN 0-7869-1882-9	Bertrem's Guide	
Chosen of the Gods	Chris Pierson	November 2001	ISBN 0-7869-1902-7	Kingpriest	
Conundrum	Jeff Crook	December 2001	ISBN 0-7869-1949-3	Age of Mortals	
Dragons of a Vanished Moon	Margaret Weis and Tracy Hickman	January 2002	ISBN 0-7869-2950-2	The War of Souls	
The Golden Orb	Douglas Niles	February 2002	ISBN 0-7869-2692-9	Icewall	
Betrayal	Jean Rabe	April 2002	ISBN 0-7869-2718-6	Dhamon Saga/Dragons of a New Age	
Sister of the Sword	Tonya C. Cook and Paul B. Thompson	May 2002	ISBN 0-7869-2789-5	Barbarians	
The Lioness	Nancy Varian Berberick	August 2002	ISBN 0-7869-2752-6	Age of Mortals	The Lioness is also featured in the short story Freedom's Pride from Rebels and Tyrants set prior to The Lioness.
Divine Hammer	Chris Pierson	October 2002	ISBN 0-7869-2807-7	Kingpriest	
Bertrem's Guide to the War of Souls, Volume Two	Mary H. Herbert, Don Perrin and Steven (Stan!) Brown	November 2002	ISBN 0-7869-2816-6	Bertrem's Guide	
The Dragon Isles	Stephen D. Sullivan	December 2002	ISBN 0-7869-2827-1	Crossroads	
The Doom Brigade	Don Perrin and Margaret Weis	2003	ISBN 0-7869-0785-1	Kang's Regiment	Kang's Regiment is first introduced in the short stories The First Dragonarmy Bridging Company and The First Dragonarmy Engineer's Secret Weapon from The Dragons of Krynn and The Dragons at War respectively. The short story To Convince the Righteous of the Right from Heroes and Fools bridges the events between The Doom Brigade and Draconian Measures.
Winterheim	Douglas Niles	January 2003	ISBN 0-7869-2911-1	Icewall	
A Warrior's Journey	Paul B. Thompson and Tonya C. Cook	May 2003	ISBN 0-7869-2965-0	Ergoth	
Night of Blood	Richard A. Knaak	June 2003	ISBN 0-7869-2938-3	Minotaur Wars	
The Middle of Nowhere	Paul B. Thompson	July 2003	ISBN 0-7869-3061-6	Crossroads	The overall story is a reinterpretation off the movie Seven Samurai and its Western remake The Magnificent Seven now set in the world of Dragonlance.
City of the Lost	Mary H. Herbert	August 2003	ISBN 0-7869-2986-3	Linsha	This series continues the story of Linsha Majere from The Clandestine Circle. Continued in the short story The Eight from Dragons of Time.
The Annotated Legends	Margaret Weis and Tracy Hickman	September 2003	ISBN 0-7869-2992-8	Dragonlance Legends	New edition
Redemption	Jean Rabe	October 2003	ISBN 0-7869-3006-3	Dhamon Saga/Dragons of a New Age	The story is continued in The Lake of Death from the Age of Mortals series.
Dark Thane	Jeff Crook	November 2003	ISBN 0-7869-2941-3	Age of Mortals	
Sacred Fire	Chris Pierson	December 2003	ISBN 0-7869-3036-5	Kingpriest	
The Wizard's Fate	Paul B. Thompson and Tonya C. Cook	February 2004	ISBN 0-7869-3214-7	Ergoth	
Tides of Blood	Richard A. Knaak	April 2004	ISBN 0-7869-3637-1	Minotaur Wars	
Prisoner of Haven	Nancy Varian Berberick	June 2004	ISBN 0-7869-3327-5	Age of Mortals	The short story Lost Causes from Rebels and Tyrants serves as a prequel to Prisoner of Haven.
Wizards' Conclave	Douglas Niles	July 2004	ISBN 0-7869-3351-8	Age of Mortals	
Amber and Ashes	Margaret Weis	August 2004	ISBN 0-7869-3257-0	Dark Disciple	
Flight of the Fallen	Mary H. Herbert	September 2004	ISBN 0-7869-3245-7	Linsha	
The Lake of Death	Jean Rabe	October 2004	ISBN 978-0-7869-3364-8	Age of Mortals	Continues the story of Dhamon Grimwulf, the main antagonist from Dragons of a New Age and The Dhamon Saga.
A Hero's Justice	Paul B. Thompson and Tonya C. Cook	December 2004	ISBN 0-7869-3397-6	Ergoth	
Return of the Exile	Mary H. Herbert	February 2005	ISBN 0-7869-3628-2	Linsha	
Lord of the Rose	Douglas Niles	March 2005	ISBN 0-7869-3146-9	Rise of Solamnia	
Blades of the Tiger	Chris Pierson	April 2005	ISBN 0-7869-3569-3	Taladas	
Empire of Blood	Richard A. Knaak	May 2005	ISBN 0-7869-3978-8	Minotaur Wars	
The Annotated Legends	Margaret Weis and Tracy Hickman	September 2005	ISBN 0-7869-3974-5	Dragonlance Legends	Trade Paperback. This annotated version of Time of the Twins, War of the Twins, and Test of the Twins contains extensive notes by Weis and Hickman.
Sanctuary	Paul B. Thompson and Tonya C. Cook	October 2005	ISBN 978-0-7869-3817-9	Elven Exiles	
Saving Solace	Douglas W. Clark	January 2006	ISBN 0-7869-3977-X	Champions	
Amber and Iron	Margaret Weis	February 2006	ISBN 0-7869-3796-3	Dark Disciple	
Trail of the Black Wyrm	Chris Pierson	April 2006	ISBN 0-7869-3979-6	Taladas	
The Crown and the Sword	Douglas Niles	June 2006	ISBN 0-7869-3788-2	Rise of Solamnia	
Dragons of the Dwarven Depths	Margaret Weis and Tracy Hickman	July 2006	ISBN 0-7869-4099-9	The Chronicles: The Lost Chronicles Trilogy	This series fills in the gaps in the Chronicles trilogy storyline.
The Alien Sea	Lucien Soulban	August 2006	ISBN 0-7869-4082-4	Champions	Continues the short story Song of the Mother from Dragons of Time.
Alliances	Paul B. Thompson and Tonya C. Cook	October 2006	ISBN 978-0-7869-4076-9	Elven Exiles	
Dragonlance Chronicles: Special Edition	Margaret Weis and Tracy Hickman	October 2006	ISBN 0-7869-4298-3	The Chronicles	New edition
The Measure and the Truth	Douglas Niles	January 2007	ISBN 0-7869-4247-9	Rise of Solamnia	
The Great White Wyrm	Peter Archer	March 2007	ISBN 0-7869-4260-6	Champions	The novel is a reinterpretation of Herman Melville's classic book Moby Dick now set in the world of Dragonlance.
Shadow of the Flame	Chris Pierson	June 2007	ISBN 0-7869-4254-1	Taladas	
Dragons of the Highlord Skies	Margaret Weis and Tracy Hickman	July 2007	ISBN 0-7869-4860-4	The Chronicles: The Lost Chronicles Trilogy	
The Rebellion	Jean Rabe	August 2007	ISBN 0-7869-4280-0	The Stonetellers	
Destiny	Paul B. Thompson and Tonya C. Cook	September 2007	ISBN 0-7869-4273-8	Elven Exiles	
Protecting Palanthas	Douglas W. Clark	October 2007	ISBN 0-7869-4808-6	Champions	
The Secret of Pax Tharkas	Douglas Niles	November 2007	ISBN 0-7869-4789-6	Dwarf Home	
Lost Leaves from the Inn of the Last Home	Margaret Weis	December 2007	ISBN 1-931567-78-6	Leaves from the Inn of the Last Home	
The Black Talon	Richard A. Knaak	December 2007	ISBN 0-7869-4299-1	Ogre Titans	
The Sellsword	Cam Banks	April 2008	ISBN 0-7869-4722-5	Anvil of Time	
Amber and Blood	Margaret Weis	May 2008	ISBN 0-7869-5001-3	Dark Disciple	
Death March	Jean Rabe	August 2008	ISBN 0-7869-4917-1	The Stonetellers	
The Heir of Kayolin	Douglas Niles	October 2008	ISBN 0-7869-5003-X	Dwarf Home	
The Survivors	Dan Willis	November 2008	ISBN 0-7869-4723-3	Anvil of Time	
The Fire Rose	Richard A. Knaak	December 2008	ISBN 0-7869-4968-6	Ogre Titans	
Renegade Wizards	Lucien Soulban	March 2009	ISBN 0-7869-5065-X	Anvil of Time	
The Forest King	Paul B. Thompson	June 2009	ISBN 0-7869-5123-0	Anvil of Time	
Dragons of the Hourglass Mage	Margaret Weis and Tracy Hickman	August 2009	ISBN 978-0-7869-4916-8	The Chronicles: The Lost Chronicles Trilogy	
Goblin Nation	Jean Rabe	October 6, 2009	ISBN 0-7869-5153-2	The Stonetellers	
The Gargoyle King	Richard A. Knaak	December 2009	ISBN 0-7869-5238-5	Ogre Titans	
2010s
The Fate of Thorbardin	Douglas Niles	January 2010	ISBN 978-0-7869-5150-5	Dwarf Home	
Dragonlance Chronicles Trilogy: A Dragonlance Omnibus	Margaret Weis and Tracy Hickman	July 2010	ISBN 0-7869-5553-8	The Chronicles	New edition
Dragonlance Legends Trilogy	Margaret Weis and Tracy Hickman	September 2011	ISBN 0-7869-5839-1	Dragonlance Legends	New edition
2020s
Dragons of Deceit	Margaret Weis and Tracy Hickman	August 2022	ISBN 9781984819321	Destinies	
Dragons of Fate	Margaret Weis and Tracy Hickman	August 2023	ISBN 9781984819383	Destinies	
Dragonlance Chronicles	Margaret Weis and Tracy Hickman	February 2024	ISBN 978-0593977156	Dragonlance Chronicles	40th Anniversary Edition
Dragons of Eternity	Margaret Weis and Tracy Hickman	August 2024	ISBN 9781984819420	Destinies	
Dragonlance Legends	Margaret Weis and Tracy Hickman	February 2026	ISBN 9798217094592	Dragonlance Legends	
War Wizard	Margaret Weis and Tracy Hickman	August 4, 2026	ISBN 9798217090716	War Wizard	

== Anthologies ==
The Dragonlance short story collections are mainly divided into the two publishing lines Tales and Dragons Anthologies. With most recent collections the dividing line has been somewhat erased. In the following are the short story collections listed in chronological order of their publishing dates.

=== Tales I ===
Title	Release	ISBN	Notes
The Magic of Krynn	March 1987	ISBN 0-88038-454-9	Edited by Margaret Weis and Tracy Hickman; Featuring short stories by Michael Williams, Barbara Siegel & Scott Siegel, Roger E. Moore, Warren B. Smith, Nick O'Donohoe, Richard A. Knaak, Nancy Varian Berberick, Mary Kirchoff, and Margaret Weis & Tracy Hickman
Kender, Gully Dwarves, and Gnomes	August 1987	ISBN 0-88038-382-8	Edited by Margaret Weis and Tracy Hickman; Featuring short stories by Nancy Varian Berberick, Morris Simon, Barbara Siegel & Scott Siegel, Danny Peaky, Harold Bakst, Richard A. Knaak, Margaret Weis & Tracy Hickman, Michael Williams, and Nick O'Donohoe
Love and War	November 1987	ISBN 0-88038-519-7	Edited by Margaret Weis and Tracy Hickman; Featuring short stories by Harold Bakst, Barbara Siegel & Scott Siegel, Nick O'Donohoe, Nancy Varian Berberick, Richard A. Knaak, Paul B. Thompson & Tonya R. Carter, Laura Hickman & Kate Novak, Margaret Weis & Dezra Despain, Kevin Randle, and Michael Williams

=== Tales II ===
Although some versions refer to these three books as the Tales II trilogy, others refer to them belonging to the original Tales trilogy, continuing from volume IV (this is because they were originally published as two trilogies and later renumbered as one six-book series).

Title	Release	ISBN	Notes
The Reign of Istar	April 1992	ISBN 1-56076-326-4	Edited by Margaret Weis and Tracy Hickman; Featuring short stories by Michael Williams, Richard A. Knaak, Nick O'Donohoe, Roger E. Moore, Douglas Niles, Nancy Varian Berberick, Dan Parkinson, and Margaret Weis & Tracy Hickman
The Cataclysm	July 1992	ISBN 1-56076-430-9	Edited by Margaret Weis and Tracy Hickman; Featuring short stories by Michael Williams & Teri Williams, Mark Anthony, Todd Fahnestock, Nick O'Donohoe, Richard A. Knaak, Dan Parkinson, Roger E. Moore, Paul B. Thompson & Tonya R. Carter, Douglas Niles, and Margaret Weis & Tracy Hickman
The War of the Lance	November 1992	ISBN 1-56076-431-7	Edited by Margaret Weis and Tracy Hickman; Featuring short stories by Michael Williams, Roger E. Moore, Nick O'Donohoe, Dan Parkinson, Jeff Grubb, Nancy Varian Berberick, Mark Anthony, Richard A. Knaak, Douglas Niles, and Margaret Weis & Tracy Hickman

=== Dragons Anthologies ===
Title	Release	ISBN	Notes
The Dragons of Krynn	March 1994	ISBN 1-56076-830-4	Edited by Margaret Weis and Tracy Hickman; Featuring short stories by Michael Williams & Teri Williams, Nancy Varian Berberick, Mickey Zucker Reichert, Douglas Niles, Robert E. Moore, Nick O'Donohoe, Jeff Grubb, Janet Pack, Amy Stout, Don Perrin, Dan Harnden, Richard A. Knaak, Linda P. Baker, Margaret Weis, and Kevin Stein
The Dragons at War	May 1996	ISBN 0-7869-0491-7	Edited by Margaret Weis and Tracy Hickman; Featuring short stories by Michael Williams, Mark Anthony, Adam Lesh, Chris Pierson, Linda P. Baker, Janet Pack, Kevin T. Stein, Teri McLaren, J. Robert King, Jeff Grubb, Nick O'Donohoe, Don Perrin & Margaret Weis, Roger E. Moore, and Douglas Niles
The Dragons of Chaos	January 1998	ISBN 0-7869-0681-2	Edited by Margaret Weis and Tracy Hickman; Featuring short stories by Sue Weinlein Cook, Mark Anthony, Linda P. Baker, Richard A. Knaak, Kevin T. Stein, Adam Lesh, Teri McLaren, Jean Rabe, Janet Pack, Nick O'Donohoe, Roger E. Moore, Chris Pierson, Jeff Grubb, Margaret Weis & Don Perrin, and Douglas Niles

=== Tales of the Fifth Age ===
Title	Release	ISBN	Notes
Relics and Omens	April 1998	ISBN 0-7869-1169-7	Edited by Margaret Weis and Tracy Hickman; Featuring short stories by Douglas Niles, Nancy Varian Berberick, Richard Knaak, Robyn McGrew, Janet Pack, Kevin T. Stein, Nick O'Donohoe, Jean Rabe, William W. Connors & Sue Weinlein Cook, Jeff Crook, Jeff Grubb, Paul B. Thompson, Roger E. Moore, and Margaret Weis & Don Perrin
Heroes and Fools	July 1999	ISBN 0-7869-1346-0	Edited by Margaret Weis and Tracy Hickman; Featuring short stories by Janet Pack, Miranda Horner, Giles Custer & Todd Fahnestock, Jeff Grubb, Nancy Varian Berberick, Paul B. Thompson, Kevin James Kage, Nick O'Donohoe, Linda P. Baker, Richard A. Knaak, Jean Rabe, Douglas Niles, Roger E. Moore, and Margaret Weis & Don Perrin
Rebels and Tyrants	April 2000	ISBN 0-7869-1676-1	Edited by Margaret Weis and Tracy Hickman; Featuring short stories by Scott M. Buraczewski, Paul B. Thompson, Don Perrin, Linda P. Baker, Kevin T. Stein, Jeff Crook, Kevin Kage, Jean Rabe, Nancy Varian Berberick, John Grubber, Chris Pierson, Richard A. Knaak, and Margaret Weis

=== Tales/Dragons from the War of Souls/World of Krynn ===
These three collections are presented as a trilogy by their outer appearance as well as by their title constructions.

Title	Release	ISBN	Notes
The Search for Magic: Tales from the War of Souls	October 2001	ISBN 0-7869-1899-3	Edited by Margaret Weis and Tracy Hickman; Featuring short stories by Brian Murphy, Nancy Varian Berberick, Linda P. Baker, Nick O'Donohoe, Paul B. Thompson, Jeff Crook, Kevin T. Stein, Jean Rabe, Richard A. Knaak, Don Perrin, Donald Bingle
The Players of Gilean: Tales from the World of Krynn	February 2003	ISBN 0-7869-2920-0	Edited by Margaret Weis and Tracy Hickman; Featuring novellas by Douglas Niles, Fergus Ryan^{t}, Paul B. Thompson, Donald J. Bingle, Richard A. Knaak, Aron Eisenberg & Jean Rabe
The Search for Power: Dragons from the War of Souls	May 2004	ISBN 0-7869-3193-0	Edited by Margaret Weis; Featuring short stories by Mark Sehestedt, Richard A. Knaak, Nancy Varian Berberick, John Helfers, Jamie Chambers, Dan Willis, Douglas W. Clark, Jean Rabe, Jeff Grubb, Lucien Soulban, Miranda Horner, Kevin T. Stein, Paul B. Thompson, and Douglas Niles

=== Further Dragons Anthologies ===
Title	Release	ISBN	Notes
Dragons: Worlds Afire	June 2006	ISBN 0-7869-4166-9	Featuring 4 novellas by R. A. Salvatore, Margaret Weis & Tracy Hickman, Keith Baker and Scott McGough.; The four novellas take place in the worlds of Forgotten Realms (Salvatore), Dragonlance (Weis & Hickman), Eberron (Baker), and Magic: The Gathering (McGough).
Dragons of Time	April 2007	ISBN 0-7869-4295-9	Edited by Margaret Weis and Tracy Hickman (Hickman is only mentioned on the cover, not inside the book.); Featuring short stories by Lizz Weis, Cam Banks, Paul B. Thompson, Jean Rabe, Douglas W. Clark, Rachel Gobar, Jake Bell, Kevin T. Stein, Richard A. Knaak, Lucien Soulban, Mary H. Herbert, and Miranda Horner & Margaret Weis

=== Best Of Anthologies ===
Title	Release	ISBN	Notes
The Best of Tales, Volume One	February 2000	ISBN 0-7869-1567-6	Edited by Margaret Weis and Tracy Hickman; Containing material from the first three Tales anthologies and one new story by Margaret Weis & Aron Eisenberg.
The Best of Tales, Volume Two	January 2002	ISBN 0-7869-2700-3	Edited by Margaret Weis and Tracy Hickman; Containing material from the second three Tales anthologies and one new RPG adventure by Tracy Hickman.
Dragons in the Archives: The Best of Weis and Hickman Anthology	November 2004	ISBN 978-0-7869-3669-4	Aside from the short stories by Margaret Weis and Tracy Hickman taken mostly from different Tales and Dragons Anthologies, the book also features short flashbacks by Jeff Grubb, Douglas Niles, Michael Williams, Jean Blashfield Black, and Jamie Chambers, mostly on how Dragonlance originally came to be.

^{t}: Fergus Ryan is a pen name for author Michael Williams

== Young Adult Readers Novels ==
=== Young Adult Chronicles ===
These novels are adaptions of the original Chronicles Trilogy to a format specifically targeted at young readers.

- A Rumor of Dragons (June 2003), by Margaret Weis and Tracy Hickman, (ISBN 0-7869-3087-X)
- Night of the Dragons (June 2003), by Margaret Weis and Tracy Hickman, (ISBN 0-7869-3090-X)
- The Nightmare Lands (October 2003), by Margaret Weis and Tracy Hickman, (ISBN 0-7869-3093-4)
- To the Gates of Palanthas (October 2003), by Margaret Weis and Tracy Hickman, (ISBN 0-7869-3096-9)
- Hope's Flame (December 2003), by Margaret Weis and Tracy Hickman, (ISBN 0-7869-3099-3)
- A Dawn of Dragons (March 2004), by Margaret Weis and Tracy Hickman, (ISBN 0-7869-3102-7)

=== Elements ===
- Pillar of Flame (January 2007), by Ree Soesbee, (ISBN 0-7869-4248-7)
- Queen of the Sea (July 2007), by Ree Soesbee, (ISBN 0-7869-4281-9)
- Tempest's Vow (April 2008), by Ree Soesbee, (ISBN 0-7869-4796-9)

=== Elidor Trilogy ===
- Crown of Thieves (November 2005), by Ree Soesbee, (ISBN 0-7869-3833-1)
- The Crystal Chalice (March 2006), by Ree Soesbee, (ISBN 978-0-7869-3994-7)
- City of Fortune (July 2006), by Ree Soesbee, (ISBN 0-7869-4026-3)

=== Goodlund Trilogy ===
- Warrior's Heart (November 2006), by Stephen D. Sullivan, (ISBN 0-7869-4187-1)
- Warrior's Blood (May 2007), by Stephen D. Sullivan, (ISBN 0-7869-4300-9)
- Warrior's Bones (November 2007), by Stephen D. Sullivan, (ISBN 0-7869-4268-1)

=== New Adventures ===
- Temple of the Dragonslayer (July 2004), by Tim Waggoner, (ISBN 0-7869-3321-6)
- The Dying Kingdom (July 2004), by Stephen D. Sullivan, (ISBN 0-7869-3324-0)
- The Dragon Well (September 2004), by Dan Willis, (ISBN 0-7869-3354-2)
- Return of the Sorceress (November 2004), by Tim Waggoner, (ISBN 0-7869-3385-2)
- Dragon Sword (January 2005), by Ree Soesbee, (ISBN 0-7869-3578-2)
- Dragon Day (March 2005), by Stan Brown, (ISBN 0-7869-3622-3)
- Dragon Knight (May 2005), by Dan Willis, (ISBN 0-7869-3735-1)
- Dragon Spell (July 2005), by Jeff Sampson, (ISBN 0-7869-3744-0)

=== Suncatcher Trilogy ===
- The Wayward Wizard (September 2006), by Jeff Sampson, (ISBN 0-7869-4163-4)
- The Ebony Eye (March 2007), by Jeff Sampson, (ISBN 978-0-7869-4255-8)
- The Stolen Sun (September 2007), by Jeff Sampson, (ISBN 0-7869-4291-6)

=== Trinistyr Trilogy ===
- Wizard's Curse (October 2005), by Christina Woods, (ISBN 0-7869-3794-7)
- Wizard's Betrayal (January 2006), by Jeff Sampson, (ISBN 0-7869-3993-1)
- Wizard's Return (May 2006), by Dan Willis, (ISBN 0-7869-4025-5)

== Related stories ==
The following two books are crossovers in which Lord Soth and others are transported to the Ravenloft world.

- Knight of the Black Rose (December 1991), by James Lowder, (ISBN 1-56076-156-3)
- Spectre of the Black Rose (March 1999), by James Lowder and Voronica Whitney-Robinson, (ISBN 0-7869-1333-9)

Six novels set in the Spelljammer universe were published by TSR before TSR was incorporated into Wizards of the Coast. The novels were interconnected and formed "The Cloakmaster Cycle". The novels tell the story of Teldin Moore, a 'groundling' farmer on Krynn who has a powerful and apparently cursed magical cloak that was given to him. The series puts the character on a quest, and showcases the Spelljammer universe.

- Beyond the Moons by David Cook, (July, 1991) (ISBN 1-56076-153-9)
