= The Gully Dwarves =

Novel by Dan Parkinson

- Cover of the first edition
- Author: Dan Parkinson
- Language: English
- Genre: Fantasy novel
- Publication place: United States
- Media type: Print (Paperback)
- ISBN: 0-7869-0497-6

The Gully Dwarves is a fantasy novel by Dan Parkinson, set in the world of Dragonlance, and based on the Dungeons & Dragons role-playing game. It is the fifth novel in the "Lost Histories" series. It was published in paperback in June 1996. It continues the short story The Promised Place from The War of the Lance. The connected short stories Off Day and Ogre Unaware from The Reign of Istar and The Cataclysm respectively serve as an indirect prelude to The Promised Place and The Gully Dwarves.

== Plot summary ==
The Gully Dwarves details the historical roots and struggles of the Aghar, the lowly dwarves of Krynn.
