= Mary Kirchoff =

American novelist

- Born: Mary L. Kirchoff; Lake Geneva, Wisconsin, U.S.
- Education: Lawrence University (BA)
- Occupations: Author, editor
- Spouse(s): Steve Winter (September 1985-); Mark Hamilton
- Writing career
- Genres: Role-playing games, fantasy

Mary L. Kirchoff is an American author of fantasy and young adult novels.

== Biography ==
Kirchoff was born and raised in Lake Geneva, Wisconsin, the city where the Dungeons & Dragons role-playing game was invented. "I went to school with Ernie Gygax and a number of people who later worked for TSR... I was vaguely aware of the people who played things like the D&D game at school. Then I went away to college and learned more about roleplaying games. I realized [they] were coming from my home town." Kirchoff graduated from Lawrence University with a B.A. in English. She was hired by TSR as the editor of the Polyhedron newszine in 1982, shortly after its second issue. Kirchoff also did graphic design for Dragon magazine, and worked with Roger Moore on TSR's Ares science-fiction magazine.

Kirchoff's first published book, Light on Quests Mountain, was set in Gamma World for TSR's Endless Quest series. She later wrote other books in the collection. Kirchoff decided to write full-time, supported by her then-boyfriend, TSR game editor and designer Steve Winter. In September 1985, Kirchoff married Steve Winter. She worked on books such as The Art of the Dragonlance Saga and Leaves from the Inn of the Last Home, and later left then rejoined the company as a full-time editor. Meanwhile, Kirchoff began looking for a new Forgotten Realms book to follow Darkwalker on Moonshae: "I went to the slush pile and read the first 30 pages of a book called Echoes of the Third Magic by a guy named Bob Salvatore. The story didn't really fit what we were looking for, but there was something about the writing that grabbed me."

Kirchoff wrote and published a short story and six novels for the Dragonlance series, including Wanderlust, Flint the King, Kendermore, "The Black Wing," and the Defenders of Magic trilogy. She also co-created the Dark Sun setting with Troy Denning and Tim Brown. After Wizards of the Coast purchased TSR, Peter Adkison brought her back as the manager of TSR's division for book publishing. She was eventually promoted to head of the book department: "Every book we published hit numerous bestseller lists -- it was a golden time." After five years of writing Dragonlance novels at night and running the book department by day, she withdrew to spend more time with her children; five years later, she returned as executive editor of the restructured book-publishing program. She rose to Vice President of Marketing, Publishing, and Tabletop Games, with brand and financial responsibility for all that had once been TSR, as well as the Avalon Hill brand of board games.

Kirchoff has been the head of Wizards of the Coast's Book Publishing division. She left Wizards of the Coast in December 2004. She went on to become Chief Marketing Officer at start-up video game company 38 Studios for nearly three years.

Her works have been translated into more than nine languages.

She later became an acquiring editor for TOR Books.
