= IRDA =

IRDA may refer to:

- Infrared Data Association, an interest group for developing infrared data communication protocols
- Insurance Regulatory and Development Authority, a government agency in India
- Intermittent rhythmic delta activity, a type of abnormal brain wave
- Iskandar Regional Development Authority, Malaysia
- International Reborn Doll Artists, a group promoting the making of reborn dolls
- Irda (Dragonlance), a fictional species in the Dragonlance series
- The Irda, a Dragonlance novel by Linda P. Baker
