= The Dragons at War =

1996 anthology novel edited by Margaret Weis and Tracy Hickman

- Cover
- Editors: Margaret Weis; Tracy Hickman
- Language: English
- Series: Dragons Anthologies
- Genre: Fantasy novel
- Published: 1996
- Publication place: United States
- Media type: Print (Paperback)

The Dragons at War is a fantasy anthology novel edited by Margaret Weis and Tracy Hickman, set in the world of Dragonlance, and based on the Dungeons & Dragons role-playing game. It is the second novel in the "Dragons Anthologies" series. It was published in paperback in May 1996, (ISBN 0-7869-0491-7).

== Contents ==
The book features short stories by Michael Williams, Mark Anthony, Adam Lesh, Chris Pierson, Linda P. Baker, Janet Pack, Kevin T. Stein, Teri McLaren, J. Robert King, Jeff Grubb, Nick O'Donohoe, Don Perrin & Margaret Weis, Roger E. Moore, and Douglas Niles.

== Reception ==
Jonathan Palmer reviewed The Dragons at War for Arcane magazine, rating it a 5 out of 10 overall. He describes the anthology as "A new collection of tales to follow The Dragons of Krynn and featuring some of TSR's better known writers, such as Mark Anthony, Douglas Niles and including a collaboration by Margaret Weis herself. The lead is taken by Michael William's poem Dream of the Namer, which calmly sets the tone of the anthology, but this edition is essentially a showcase for up-and-coming writers and, unfortunately, they're not all particularly good. It's not that they can't write, but you get the impression they don't know what they should be writing about. There are good ideas, such as Jeff Grubb's 'gnomite', a rock, which when refined produces 'Plus-Gnomium': a pound of this stuff will produce an explosion capable of creating a crater half a mile wide and a fire storm of four to six miles across. The gnomes have developed cold fusion. This is an amusing tale, but some of the other tales, though they wander articulately, too often tend to go nowhere for 20 pages and then end." He continues: "So, as you move from story to story, this produces a jarring distinction between those writers who are obviously comfortable in Krynn and those others who still have something to prove. Mark Anthony's use of the first person for the magic user, in the atmospheric People of the Dragon, is an example of the former. Some of the others leave you with the impression of having been produced by TSR's reserve team, though - newer, less experienced writers who will have to improve to make it in this genre. There are definitely some highlights among the tiros, though." Palmer concludes his review by saying, "Janet Pack's Proper Tribute is a prickly piece about how the enmity between dragon and rider turns to friendship in battle, while Chris Pierson's first published Dragonlance story demonstrates the affection for Krynn he is reported to have had since he was 12 - we'll see more of him, no doubt. But we may not see some of the other bards at Margaret Weis' storytellers' gathering at the Inn of the Last Home again."
