= Weasel's Luck =

1988 fantasy novel

- Cover of the first edition
- Author: Michael Williams
- Language: English
- Series: Dragonlance Heroes
- Genre: Fantasy
- Publisher: TSR, Inc.
- Publication date: 1988
- Publication place: United States
- Media type: Print (Paperback)
- ISBN: 0-7869-3181-7
- Followed by: Galen Beknighted

Weasel's Luck is a fantasy novel by Michael Williams. It is the first of the two Dragonlance novels starring Galen "Weasel" Pathwarden and Sir Bayard Brightblade.

== Setting ==
Weasel's Luck takes place about one century prior to the adventures of the original trilogy (Dragons of Autumn Twilight, Dragons of Winter Night, Dragons of Spring Dawning). The book includes a map of the lands where the action takes place.

== Summary ==
This is the story of Sir Bayard Brightblade, ancestor of Sturm Brightblade, an epic quest of valorous knights against an ancient evil. Nevertheless, the story is told from the point of view of Galen Pathwarden, nicknamed Weasel, his cowardly and reluctant squire.

Sir Bayard Brightblade is a knight of Solamnia bound by a prophecy to win the hand of Enid Di Caela, last heir to the Di Caela family. Before he can properly ask her, though, he needs a new squire. For this reason, he traveled to the remote province of Coastlund and paid a visit to Sir Andrew Pathwarden, father of three boys.

A black-robed mage, known only as the Scorpion, is plotting against Sir Bayard. He bribes Galen with half a dozen opals from Estwilde (they will become important in the sequel) and steals the knight's armour. Then, he stirs mayhem in the Pathwarden estate, turning the villagers hostile and pushing the swamp centaurs into a war against newcoming satyrs. Sir Bayard manages to overcome these obstacles and gets on the road to Castle di Caela, but he is delayed again by an ogre knight blocking a pass on the Vingaard Mountains.

Meanwhile, at Castle di Caela, Sir Robert declares a tournament to find the most suitable husband for his daughter Enid. Knowing the prophecy, he is waiting for Sir Bayard Brightblade, who is supposed to lift the curse on the Di Caela family. That knight being late, he starts the tournament, that is won by a creepy black-hooded knight who goes by the name of Sir Gabriel Androctus.

At last, Sir Bayard arrives at the castle, where he discovers the true identity and motivation of Sir Gabriel, alias the Scorpion. The hooded knight kidnaps Lady Enid and flees from the castle to the East, all the way across Solamnia and Central Estwilde. He is pursued by Sir Bayard, Sir Robert di Caela, Sir Ramiro of the Maw, and the three Pathwarden brothers: Galen, Brithelm, and Alfric.

After an epic battle in the Scorpion's stronghold, the villain is killed, the curse is lifted, the damsel in distress is rescued, she gladly marries Sir Bayard, and they lived happily ever after... until the sequel, "Galen Beknighted".

== Legacy ==
The novel received a sequel, Galen Beknighted, written by the same author, Michael Williams, and published two years later, in 1990. Later, in 1992, M. Williams wrote a third novel, The Oath and the Measure, that focuses on the descendant of Bayard Brightblade, but it also includes many episodes that reference Weasel's Luck and the events after Galen Beknighted.

== Reception ==
In the Io9 series revisiting older Dungeons & Dragons novels, Rob Bricken commented that "The more I write this, the more reasons I find to dislike Weasel's Luck, and yet, somehow it kept me more interested than some of the other Dungeons & Dragons novels I've reread. That said, I'm not particularly enthused to check out the sequel, titled Galen Beknighted. I believe I've gotten my fill of Weasel, who rolls a 10. It's not a particularly lucky number, but guess what? Along with no Heroes or Dragonlances, Weasel doesn't really have any luck, either."

== Reviews ==
- Review by Andy Sawyer (1989) in Paperback Inferno, #81
- Review by Jim Milner (1990) in The British Fantasy Newsletter, Winter 198

== See also ==
- List of Dragonlance novels
