= The Forest King =

2009 fantasy novel by Paul B. Thompson

- Cover of the first edition
- Author: Paul B. Thompson
- Language: English
- Genre: Fantasy novel
- Publisher: TSR, Inc.
- Publication date: June 2009
- Publication place: United States
- Media type: Print (Paperback)

The Forest King is a fantasy novel by Paul B. Thompson, set in the world of Dragonlance, which is based on the Dungeons & Dragons fantasy role-playing game. The novel chronicles the travels of Balif Thraxenath, Chosen Chief of House Protector, First Warrior of the Great Speaker, following the trial of Vedvedsica.

== Plot summary ==
After the trial of Vedvedsica, General Balif is sent on a mission to ascertain the true danger of a new race of small humanoids infiltrating the eastern borders of Silvanesti.

He travels east with an unlikely group. His two loyal servants, Lofotan and Artyrith, both formidable warriors, and Mathi, and Treskan unsure where their loyalties lie.

== Characters ==
- Balif Thraxenath, Chosen Chief of House Protector, First Warrior of the Great Speaker. General Balif, also known as Camaxilas.
- Uristathan Cavolax also known as Vedvedsica. A wizard charged with creating an abomination.
- Lofotan
- Artyrith, the generals cook, and a warrior in his own right.
- Mathani Arborelinex a ward of Quenesti Pha from the Haven of the Lost.
- Treskan of Woodbec, a scribe.
- Amaranthe
- The Longwalker, the nominal leader of the kender.
- Rufus Wrinkelcap

== Other books ==
The Forest King is part of the Anvil of Time series, which also includes:

- The Sellsword (April 2008), by Cam Banks, (ISBN 0-7869-4722-5)
- The Survivors (November 2008), by Dan Willis, (ISBN 0-7869-4723-3)
- Renegade Wizards (March 2009), by Lucien Soulban, (ISBN 0-7869-5065-X)
