= Dwarf (Dungeons & Dragons) =

Fictional playable humanoid race

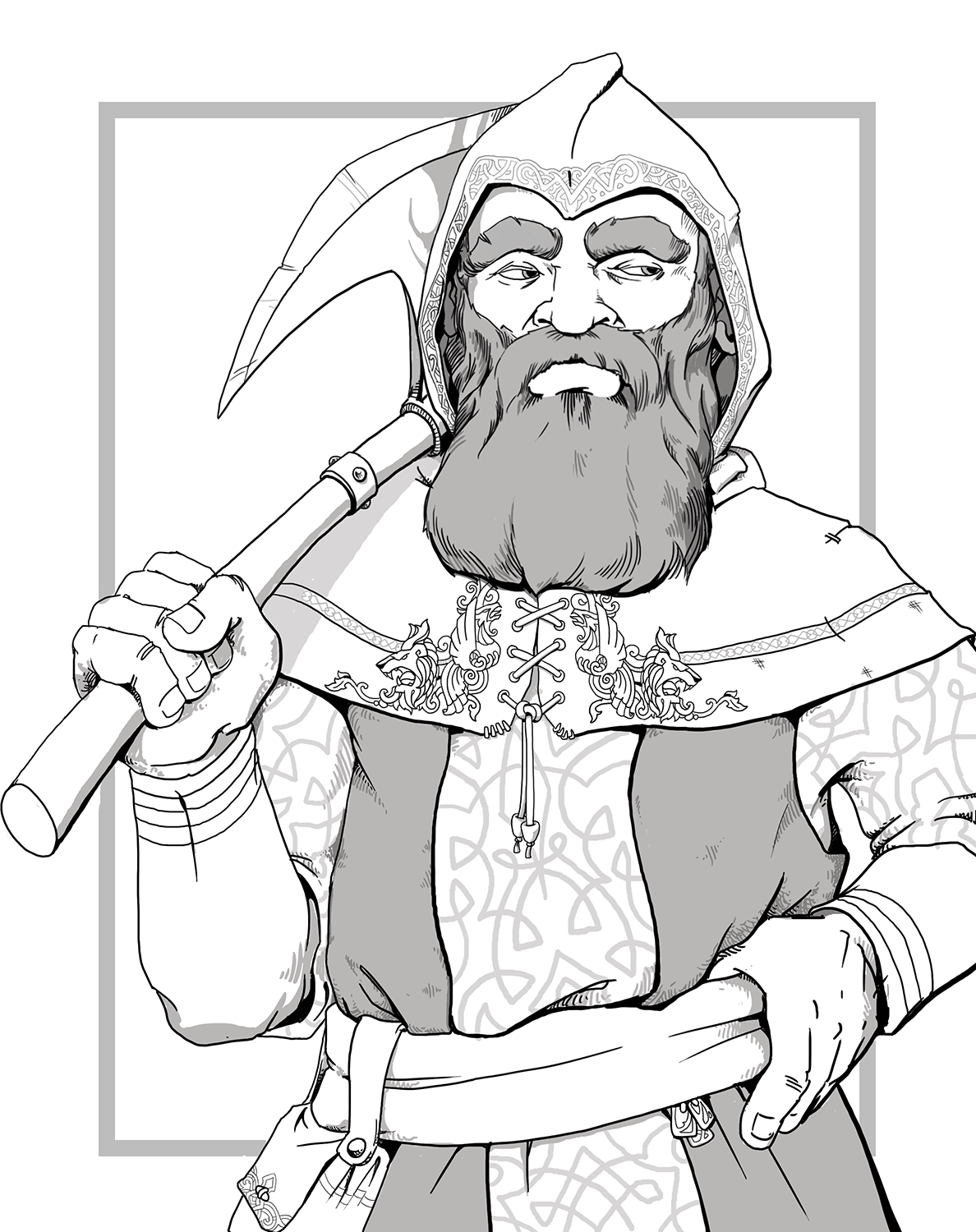
- An illustration of a dwarf
- First appearance: the original 1974 edition of Dungeons & Dragons
- Based on: Dwarf

In-universe information
- Type: Natural Humanoid
- Alignment: Often Lawful Good

A dwarf, in the Dungeons & Dragons (D&D) fantasy roleplaying game, is a humanoid race, one of the primary races available for player characters. The idea for the D&D dwarf comes from the dwarves of European mythologies and J. R. R. Tolkien's novel The Lord of the Rings (1954–1955), and has been used in D&D and its predecessor Chainmail since the early 1970s. Variations from the standard dwarf archetype of a short and stout demihuman are commonly called subraces, of which there are more than a dozen across many different rule sets and campaign settings.

== History ==
The concept of the dwarf comes from Norse and Teutonic mythology. In particular, the dwarves in the Germanic story The Ring of the Nibelungen and the Brothers Grimm fairy tale "Rumpelstiltskin" have been called "ancestors" of Dungeons & Dragons dwarves. Along with giants, dwarves were one of the first types of non-humans to be introduced into the Chainmail game, the forebear of D&D, when miniature figures of varying sizes were used together in the same wargame. The dwarf in D&D is based on Tolkien's version of the dwarf.

The dwarf first appears as a player character race in the original 1974 edition of Dungeons & Dragons, with a design that is strongly influenced by the dwarves of Poul Anderson's 1961 novel Three Hearts and Three Lions. This early version of the D&D dwarf is limited to playing a fighter, and can not progress beyond the sixth level. With the release of the first supplement, Greyhawk, in 1976, they were then allowed to play a thief with no level restriction. Beginning with the 1981 revision of the Dungeons & Dragons Basic Set, and continuing also in all subsequent revisions, demi-humans such as dwarves were treated as their own classes. Dwarves were only permitted a maximum level of 12 (compared to the Halfling's 8, the Elves' 10, and the human classes 36). With the arrival of Advanced Dungeons & Dragons, the dwarf was returned to a player character race in the Player's Handbook (1978) and detailed as a monster in the original Monster Manual (1977). A number of dwarven subraces are presented as character races in the original Unearthed Arcana (1985).

In 1989, the hill dwarf, the most common dwarven subrace, appears as a character race in the second edition Advanced Dungeons & Dragons Player's Handbook and as a monster in the Monstrous Compendium Volume Two. Dwarves are detailed as a race for the Forgotten Realms setting in Dwarves Deep (1990). Several dwarven races are detailed as player character races in The Complete Book of Dwarves (1991). The dwarf appears as a character race in the third edition Player's Handbook (2000), the 3.5 revised Player's Handbook (2003), the fourth edition Player's Handbook (2008), and the fifth edition Player's Handbook (2014). The arctic dwarf, gray dwarf, gold dwarf, shield dwarf, urdunnir, and wild dwarf are all detailed in Races of Faerûn (2003). Dwarves are one of the races detailed in Races of Stone (2004). The dwarf, including the dwarf bolter and the dwarf hammerer, appears as a monster in the fourth edition Monster Manual (2008).

== Description ==
Dwarves average four feet in height, with stout, broad bodies. Male dwarves grow thick facial hair. The female dwarves in The Lord of the Rings novels, which greatly inspired D&D, were able to grow beards as well. Some authors, such as R. A. Salvatore, have followed suit in their writing. This was reflected in game mechanics as well, but the game rules' official position was rarely concrete or specific, and it varied by dwarven culture or ancestry. In The Complete Book of Dwarves, women amongst the deep dwarves "wear their beards long, unlike other dwarf women (who are typically cleanshaven)." Additionally, in specific campaign settings the potential for female dwarven facial hair sees much variation: In the World of Greyhawk, all dwarves—including females—grow and wear beards, but only a portion of females are known to shave, in the Forgotten Realms they can grow full beards but also usually shave, and in Eberron they do not grow facial hair at all. The art of various editions (especially later editions), however, has frequently portrayed dwarven women as beardless. In the preview for the fourth edition of Dungeons and Dragons, Wizards Presents: Races and Classes, artist William O'conner discussed how the design team gave him specific direction to change the way female dwarves were depicted. Rob Heinsoo also said in the same book that O'Conner's art "gifted us with a magnificent new look for dwarf women. Strong, sensual, earthy and feminine, with an exotic beauty that no one would think to splash a beard on." However, this was not reflected in fourth edition rules, only in art, and still varied depending on the campaign setting.

Philip J. Clements listed the dwarves' skill in metalworking and fondness for ale as cultural characteristics.

The book Three Hearts and Three Lions by Poul Anderson strongly influenced Dungeons & Dragons, having a dwarf named Hugi with a Scottish accent. Most popular portrayals of dwarves feature such an accent. Dwarves tend to be more useful for combat-oriented players, as they gain a number of special abilities and bonuses in combat, mostly related to their hardiness and smaller stature compared to humans. Dwarves are also resistant to poison and magic, can see in the dark (a skill called infravision in earlier editions and darkvision beginning with third edition), and can detect different types of mining-related features underground, such as sloping tunnels. The dwarven ability to detect a sloping passage underground is also taken directly from Anderson's book.

Dwarves are generally good in alignment. Ilan Mitchell-Smith wrote that dwarves, along with other races allowed for use by players such as elves and halflings, are "defined in terms of subjectivity, and ultimately, humanity" as opposed to many other creatures who serve as a type of "monstrous other". Philip J. Clements observed that dwarves "tend to embody an extreme vision of masculinity".

Dwarves usually worship Moradin, whom they believe is their creator. According to their legends, Moradin fashioned the dwarves into a likeness of himself using gems and metal. He then breathed life into them. In many campaign settings, the dwarven pantheon of gods consists of the leader Moradin, as well as Abbathor, Berronar Truesilver, Clanggedin Silverbeard, Dugmaren Brightmantle, Dumathoin, Muamman Duathal, and Vergadain, and Laduguer is god of the duergar. Several gods including Hanseath were introduced in Races of Stone. Other dwarven gods may be present in different campaign settings.

Dwarves get along well with gnomes, who are often regarded as close cousins of the dwarven race. Dwarves are accepting of humans, half-elves and halflings. Dwarves often do not get to know humans well as they live longer than the average human, and prefer to become friendly with the human's family in general. Dwarves do not trust half-orcs, and fail to appreciate elves, with whom they only ally in their many battles against orcs, goblins, evil giants and trolls.

=== Dethek script ===
In the first edition Cyclopedia of the Realms, released with the Forgotten Realms Campaign Set in 1987, the dwarves are described having a runic-type script called Dethek, which translates directly into "Common". It is said they prefer to not write on that which can perish, and thus inscribe on metal or stone. Books can be made from bound metal sheets. The stone tablets they write on are called "runestones" in common tongue and described as being diamond-shaped, about an inch thick, and of some very hard rock. Inscriptions spiral around the edge, being read from the outer edge toward the center.

Words are separated by spaces, sentences by crossed lines; and capital letters have a line drawn above them. If any glyphs are painted, names of beings and places are commonly picked out in red, while the rest of the text is colored black or left as unadorned grooves. A numbering system also exist, essentially a variation of pentadic numerals, as well as ideographs for clans, tribes and races. Some tablets bare reliefs and can be used as stamps for various purposes.

== Subraces ==
Over the history of D&D publications and rules editions, more than a dozen subraces of dwarf have been described. Hill dwarves are the standard dwarven race. Mountain dwarves live deeper underground and have fairer skin than hill dwarves. Aleithian dwarves are deep-dwelling psionic dwarves who follow the dragon god Sardior. In the 1st, 2nd, and 3rd editions of D&D, Azers physically resembled dwarves, though they were unrelated. In the 4th Edition of the game, they are a product of the enslavement of dwarves by giants and titans. Badlands dwarves have adapted to life in the inhospitable wastes, developing a natural knack for finding water and tolerance to heat and thirst. Deep dwarves dwell underground and have a greater ability to see in the dark, but are sensitive to light. They are more resistant to magic and poison than standard dwarves. Dream dwarves are contemplative dwarves in touch with the world around them, which they call the "earth dream." The duergar, or "gray dwarves", are an "evil and avaricious" subrace that live in the Underdark. The name duergar is derived from Norse mythology, while Aardy R. DeVarque saw gnomes described by Paraclesus, "malicious, greedy, and miserable" "earth elementals", as inspiration for their character. with a Bleeding Cool editor Gavin Sheehan praised the more detailed background for duergar in Mordenkainen's Tome of Foes, "with their own set of goals and reasoning behind what they [as] both exciting and horrifying", called "their lore [...] fascinating and intriguing" and declared them "a force to be dealt with" in no easy way. Frost dwarves are extra-planar dwarves who reside on the Iron Wastes of the Infinite Layers of the Abyss. They were once duergar enslaved by frost giants. Glacier dwarves reside in cold glaciers, mining a special material known as blue ice. These dwarves have great skill at crafting with ice and magical ice, and are tolerant to cold weather. Seacliff dwarves make their home in high seaside cliffs and are excellent swimmers.

=== In campaign settings ===
On Athas, the planet of the Dark Sun campaign setting, dwarves stand less than 5' tall and weigh nearly 200 lbs. Each dwarf pursues a singular obsession, called a focus, that requires at least a week to complete. Athasian dwarves do not live underground, but some communities focus on unearthing long-lost dwarven strongholds. Physically, the dwarves of Athas are unique among their kind, having no hair at all. Athasian dwarves can breed with humans to produce muls, who are sterile offspring that share the strength and resiliency of dwarves with the size of humans.

In the Dragonlance setting, the dwarves are divided into three distinct groups, which are sub-divided into clans. Hill dwarves consist of a single clan called the Neidar. They are very similar to the mountain dwarves but are slightly more forthcoming towards other races and cultures. Flint Fireforge, one of the Heroes of the Lance, is a Neidar. Mountain dwarves consist of several clans, two of these being the Hylar and the Daewar clans. Gully dwarves, or Aghar ("the Anguished") are thought to be the offspring of gnomes and dwarves. Gully dwarves are first referred to in the Dragonlance Chronicles, by Margaret Weis and Tracy Hickman, as a "miserable lot." Several clans live together, following the rule of their chieftains or one particular powerful leader. Gully dwarves are known to be vicious fighters when cornered. They are generally stupid and often hold menial jobs. They have been characterized as "a tiny, dirty, unorganized folk", but as having heart. The highest an average gully dwarf can count is 2, though some have become smart enough to count to 3. They are smaller than normal dwarves. They have no land of their own and live in ruined cities, sewers, and dirty parts of cities. Blogger Graeme Barber criticized their portrayal as "unintelligent sub-humanoids" who are "profoundly mentally disabled to the point of not really even having a language" as stereotypical. Gully dwarves could be used as player characters in the D&D game. They were by design weaker than other character options, and so only appealing to few players who "enjoy the underdog status" they provided.

The Forgotten Realms world of Faerûn has several major dwarven subraces. Shield dwarves, also known as mountain dwarves, are the dominant dwarves in the northern parts of Faerûn. These dwarves tend to be fatalistic due to generations of declining numbers. Gold dwarves, also known as hill dwarves, are the dominant dwarves in southern Faerûn. They are generally a more upbeat group than their northern cousins. They primarily reside in and around the Deep Realm, an underground realm surrounding a Grand Canyon-like gorge. Arctic dwarves (also known as the Inugaakalikurit), found in the northernmost reaches of Faerûn, are smaller and stronger than most other dwarves, and immune to cold. Urdunnir, also known as orecutter dwarves, have the magical ability to shape metal and stone, and can walk through the latter. Wild dwarves are short, primitive dwarves found in the deep jungles of Faerûn. Gray dwarves, or duergar, are mainly found in the Underdark, and have an aversion to light. Bruenor Battlehammer, a Shield Dwarf, is the king of Mithril Hall in the Forgotten Realms setting who reclaims his homeland from monsters including a shadow dragon named Shimmergloom that he kills single-handedly. Their gods include Deep Duerra, Gorm Gulthyn, Haela Brightaxe, Marthammor Duin, and Thard Harr.

In the World of Greyhawk setting, the group of humans known as Flan call dwarves dwur. They are found throughout the Flanaess, and are particularly numerous in the Lortmils, Principality of Ulek, Glorioles, Iron Hills, Crystalmists, and Ratik. Lord Obmi is a notable dwarf of the setting, a servant of Iuz and member of the Boneshadow organization.

Dwarves in the Spelljammer campaign setting operate in huge spacefaring asteroids, honeycombed with tunnels.

== Novels ==
D&D novels prominently featuring dwarves include the following:

- Dragonlance
  - Dragons of the Dwarven Depths (July 2006), by Margaret Weis and Tracy Hickman, (ISBN 0-7869-4099-9)
  - The Last Thane by Douglas Niles
  - Dark Thane by Jeff Crook
  - The Dwarf Home trilogy by Douglas Niles
  - The Dwarven Nations trilogy by Dan Parkinson
  - The Gates of Thorbardin by Dan Parkinson
  - Gully Dwarves by Dan Parkinson
  - Kender, Gully Dwarves, and Gnomes (August 1987), edited by Margaret Weis and Tracy Hickman, (ISBN 0-88038-382-8)
- Forgotten Realms
  - The War of the Spider Queen series by R.A. Salvatore
  - The Icewind Dale Trilogy by R.A. Salvatore

== Legacy ==
Next to J.R.R. Tolkien's work, being a core player character race in Dungeons & Dragons has contributed significantly to popularizing the concept of the dwarf in contemporary culture.

The depiction of dwarves in Dungeons & Dragons has been cited as the inspiration for the dwarves in World of Warcraft.

Environmental humanities scholar Matthew Chrulew considered the dwarves division into subraces as an option "to customize a campaign, [...] based on relationship to place".

== Reception ==
Gus Wezerek, for FiveThirtyEight, reported that of the 5th Edition "class and race combinations per 100,000 characters that players created on D&D Beyond from" August 15 to September 15, 2017, dwarves were the third most created at 9,507 total. The three most popular class combinations with the dwarf were Cleric (2,199), Fighter (2,009), and Barbarian (1,323). Wezerek noted "some of the common character choices can be explained by the game's structure of racial bonuses".
