= The Gates of Thorbardin =

1990 novel by Dan Parkinson

- Author: Dan Parkinson
- Language: English
- Genre: Fantasy novel
- Publisher: TSR, Inc.
- Publication date: 1990
- Publication place: United States
- Media type: Print (Paperback)
- Pages: 310
- ISBN: 0-88038-912-5

The Gates of Thorbardin is the second novel in the Heroes II trilogy of the Dragonlance novels. It was written in 1990 by Dan Parkinson.

== Synopsis ==
The Gates of Thorbardin is a novel in which the main characters are the dwarves Chane Feldstone and Jillian Firestoke, with additional characters including the kender Chestal Thicketsway and the unwanted unexploded spell named Zap which accompanies and even talks to him, and an incurably insane gnome named Bobbin who was banished from his colony.

According to Parkinson, the challenge with this novel was "to bring these people, who are of a different race than I am, very much to life to make them as much as possible three-dimensional people and show them as being the best of what they are, and not necessarily the best of what they would be if they were human." Parkinson says that the book is essentially "the story of Chane, a Thorbardin dwarf, and his quest to find the Helm of Grallen and to seal the secret entrance of Thorbardin against incursion by magic".

== Plot summary ==
The major plotline of The Gates of Thorbardin is that there once existed a hidden entrance to the Dwarven realm of Thorbardin. During the War of the Lance, this gate could be used as an entrance by the forces of Takhisis to destroy the Dwarven kingdom.

The major character in this novel is a Dwarf by the name of Chane Feldstone. Chane comes to the knowledge of the secret entrance to Thorbardin through a dream. Chane doesn't know of his heritage, but he learns that he is a direct descendant of Grallen of Thorbardin who died fighting the mage Fistandantilus years before. Chane learns that his ancestor Grallen was attempting to seal the hidden entrance to Thorbardin using a powerful artifact known as Spellbinder which was once used in conjunction with another Gemstone named by the Dwarves Pathfinder to contain the magic of the Graygem of Gargath.

The main character picks up a number of other characters such as Wingover, Chestal Thicketsway, Bobbin, and Jillian Firestoke in his travels. Among other notable events, Chane comes across the original location of the Graygem in Waykeep Valley and encounters the Irda. He also encounters the remains of the Hill Dwarves and Mountain Dwarves encased in ice since the Dwarfgate Wars. Chane also finds the Helm of Grallen in the remains of rubble which were blown away from the tower of Zhaman.

A secondary plot line revolves around the renegade mage Caliban who was hunted down and killed years before by members of the three orders of magic. Caliban pulled his own heart out during the encounter and his shriveled heart remained as a power artifact used by the major antagonist in the story Kolanda Darkmoor. Caliban through Kolanda seeks the death of the three mages that hunted him down and killed him years before. Glenshadow the Wanderer, who wears the Red robes of Neutrality was one of the three mages to survive the encounter with Caliban. Caliban and Glenshadow encounter each other near the end of the novel.

At the end of the novel Chane with the help of his traveling companions is able to discover the location of the hidden entrance, which is near Sky's End Peak near Northgate, by using the gem Pathfinder and the Helm of Grallen. Chane places Spellbinder inside the hidden entrance and the entrance is sealed from the outside as the result of a terrible magic storm.

All the major benefactors in the story survive, the hidden entrance is sealed against magic (through Spellbinder which is now buried) and the Helm of Grallen passes into the realm of Thorbardin.

== See also ==
- List of Dragonlance novels
