= The Kagonesti =

1995 novel by Douglas Niles

- Cover of the first edition
- Language: English
- Genre: Fantasy novel
- Publication place: United States
- Media type: Print (Paperback)
- ISBN: 0-7869-0091-1

The Kagonesti is a fantasy novel by Douglas Niles, set in the world of Dragonlance, and based on the Dungeons & Dragons role-playing game. It is the first novel in the "Lost Histories" series. It was published in paperback in January 1995.

== Plot summary ==
The Kagonesti (A Story of the Wild Elves) details the historical roots and struggles of the Kagonesti, the wild elves of Krynn.

== Reviews ==
- Kliatt
