= New Tales: The Land Reborn =

Fantasy tabletop role-playing adventure

- Code: DLT1
- First published: 1993

New Tales: The Land Reborn is an adventure for the 2nd edition of the Advanced Dungeons & Dragons fantasy role-playing game, published in 1993.

== Contents ==
The module comprises four scenarios and supports Dragon Lance: New Tales.

== Publication history ==
The module's author is Jim Musser and it was published by TSR.

== Reception ==
Gene Alloway reviewed New Tales in a 1994 issue of White Wolf. On a scale of 1 to 5, he rated the module a 3 for Appearance, Concepts, and Value, a 2 for Complexity, and a 4 for Playability. He stated, "It’s a solid set of adventures, but no new rules are used. ... The value of The Land Reborn is average. ... Overall, The Land Reborn is a standard product." Overall, Alloway rated it a 3 out of 5.
