= The Dragons (novel) =

Novel by Douglas Niles

- Cover of the first edition
- Author: Douglas Niles
- Language: English
- Genre: Fantasy novel
- Publication place: United States
- Media type: Print (Paperback)
- ISBN: 0-7869-0513-1

The Dragons is a fantasy novel by Douglas Niles, set in the world of Dragonlance, and based on the Dungeons & Dragons role-playing game. It is the sixth novel in the "Lost Histories" series. It was published in paperback in October 1996. The short story Aurora's Eggs from The Dragons at War serves as a prequel to The Dragons.

== Plot summary ==
The Dragons details the historical roots and struggles of the dragons of Krynn.
