= Shadow Sorcerer =

1991 video game

- Cover art by Larry Elmore
- Developer: U.S. Gold
- Publishers: Strategic Simulations; U.S. Gold
- Producer: Mike Wilding
- Designers: George MacDonald; Jeff Groteboer
- Programmer: Graham Lilley
- Artist: Kevin Bulmer
- Composers: George Alistair Sanger; Martin Walker
- Series: Dragonlance
- Platforms: Amiga, Atari ST, MS-DOS
- Release: 1991
- Genre: Role-playing
- Mode: Single-player

Shadow Sorcerer is a role-playing video game published in 1991 by Strategic Simulations. The game is the sequel to Heroes of the Lance and Dragons of Flame. It is based on the third and fourth Dragonlance campaign modules, Dragons of Hope and Dragons of Desolation.

== Plot ==
The plot is a faithful representation of the third and fourth module of Dragonlance, Dragons of Hope and Dragons of Desolation. The same two modules were also adapted into a novel, Dragons of the Dwarven Depths.

== Reception ==
Reception

Review scores
Publication	Score
Zero	87% (MS-DOS)
CU Amiga	81% (Amiga)
The One	77% (Amiga)

Matt Regan of CU Amiga noted that Shadow Sorcerer largely lacked role-playing elements, but summarized that "for AD&D junkies this is an amusing diversion with a novel outlook for the genre". In Zero, David Wilson called the game "a marked improvement in AD&D computer gaming" compared to other output from Strategic Simulations, aside from Eye of the Beholder. He concluded that "Shadow Sorcerer is another sign that SSI is finally getting its act together to produce games that justify the mighty AD&D licence".

The One gave the Amiga version of Shadow Sorcerer an overall score of 77%, beginning their review by stating that 'it's a pity' that Shadow Sorcerer "doesn't offer as much" as Eye of the Beholder, furthermore saying that "Shadow Sorcerer fails in that there is either too much or too little going on at one time". The One expresses that the refugees the player must protect "move at such a slow pace that you can't help getting bored waiting for them" and if the player leaves them to explore, the player is punished in that the refugees are open to attack, and isn't able to get back to them in time. The One criticises Shadow Sorcerer's combat, stating that the computer has no sense of simple strategy; the players will often get into combat and prepare the wizard to cast a fireball spell, only to find that the rest of the characters have run into the fight and got in the way, completely wasting it. The One calls Shadow Sorcerer good "to a certain extent", and expresses that it "never quite reaches [what] other RPGs have managed to".

The game is generally regarded as much superior to any early D&D action games, and is considered a big step forward in playability for AD&D action games.
