= Dragons in the Archives: The Best of Weis and Hickman Anthology =

- Cover of the first edition
- Language: English
- Genre: Fantasy novel
- Publication place: United States
- Media type: Print (Paperback)
- ISBN: 978-0-7869-3669-4

Dragons in the Archives: The Best of Weis and Hickman Anthology is a fantasy anthology published in November 2004, set in the world of Dragonlance, and based on the Dungeons & Dragons role-playing game.

== Contents ==
Aside from the short stories by Margaret Weis and Tracy Hickman taken mostly from different Tales and Dragons Anthologies and Dragon magazine itself, the book also features short flashbacks by Jeff Grubb, Douglas Niles, Michael Williams, Jean Blashfield Black, and Jamie Chambers, mostly on how Dragonlance originally came to be. The anthology ends with an interview with Weis and Hickman about the history and future of the fictional world.

Among the stories included in the anthology are "The Silken Threads", "True Knight", "The Traveling Players of Gilean", "Honor and Guile", and "The Story That Tasslehoff Promised He Would Never, Ever Tell".

== Reception ==
Ginger Armstrong of Kliatt magazine gave the anthology a positive review, saying that the stories were "fast-paced [and] addictive". She felt the book would be enjoyable for both old fans and people new to the fictional world of Dragonlance, noting that the essays and interviews provided interesting background information.
