= The Swordsheath Scroll =

1993 novel by Dan Parkinson

The Swordsheath Scroll is a fantasy novel by Dan Parkinson, set in the world of Dragonlance, and based on the Dungeons & Dragons game.

== Plot summary ==
The Swordsheath Scroll is a novel in which the dwarves of Thorbadin have grown isolated in their mountain stronghold and have lost much of their unity. Outside their realm, a corrupt human empire has risen to power and enslaved the Neidar dwarves, threatening what remains of the ancient dwarven nations. A young Hylar dwarf emerges from among the enslaved and, with the aid of an elven wizard, leads a revolt that frees the captives. He then sets out to reclaim the old dwarven territories, gradually reuniting the fractured clans. Through his victories and leadership, he brings renewed purpose to the dwarves of Thorbadin and ultimately becomes the ruler of all dwarvenkind.

== Reception ==
Hugh M. Flick for Kliatt called this the third novel in "a fine series".

== Reviews ==
- Review by Pam Allan (1995) in ConNotations, Winter 1995
