= DragonStrike (video game) =

1990 video game

- Commodore 64 cover art
- Developer: Westwood Associates
- Publisher: Strategic Simulations
- Designers: Louis Castle; Brett Sperry
- Composers: Paul Mudra (MS-DOS, NES); Frank Klepacki (NES); Yasuhiro Kawasaki (PC-98); Yoshio Kobayashi (PC-98)
- Platforms: Amiga, Commodore 64, MS-DOS, PC-9801, X68000, NES
- Release: 1990: Amiga, C64, MS-DOS; March 1992: PC-98, X68000; August 1992: NES
- Genre: Combat flight simulation
- Mode: Single-player

DragonStrike is a 1990 flight simulator based on the Dungeons & Dragons fantasy tabletop role-playing game. It is set in the Dragonlance campaign setting.

== Gameplay ==
Gameplay screenshot (Amiga)

DragonStrike is a flight simulator in a high fantasy setting. The player character is a knight who flies on the back of a metallic dragon equipped with a lance and various magic items (among other things a magic orb that acts as a radar in the game). The player's dragon can use its recharging magical breath to attack and can also attack with its claws or bite if the dragon passes closely above enemies (likewise, should the dragon pass closely beneath enemies, the player character might attack with his sword). Opponents in the game include evil dragons with and without riders and other flying monsters such as manticores, wyverns, sivak draconians and beholderkin known as gas spores. Flying too close to the ground is another hazard for the player as enemy archers are present in some areas.

Completing successful missions provides the character with more hit points and the opportunity to obtain a more powerful dragon. Depending on what dragon the player chooses (between a bronze, a silver, or a gold dragon) the ending and missions become slightly different.

== Plot ==
The game is set in Krynn, world of the Dragonlance saga, during the War of the Lance. The main character is a young knight of Solamnia who progressively climbs the ranks of knighthood and is assigned to different dragon mounts. The story starts halfway through the action of the previous title, War of the Lance, after the metallic dragons joined the fight alongside the Knights of Solamnia, and it ends roughly at the same time, with a major victory of the forces of the god Paladine.

On the other hand, the main character of the NES remake is a dragon without any rider. The action starts at the same time as the original, but it ends later, featuring an ending that is different from the one in the novels and in the tabletop modules.

== Development ==
Westwood Studios had ported other SSI products, but DragonStrike was its first original game for SSI. It was designed by Louis Castle and Brett Sperry. The game was first released in 1990.

== Ports ==
The NES version is a scrolling shooter.

Ports of DragonStrike for the PC-9801 and X68000, developed by Crosstalk, were published in 1992.

A game of the same title was published by Pony Canyon for the Nintendo Entertainment System in 1992. Despite an almost identical title screen and box cover, it is noticeably different from versions of the game for other systems: instead of being a first-person flight simulator, it is a top-down scrolling shooter, with only 14 missions instead of the original 40.

== Reception ==
SSI sold 34,296 copies of DragonStrike. The game was reviewed in 1990 in Dragon #161 by Hartley, Patricia, and Kirk Lesser in "The Role of Computers" column. The reviewers gave the game 5 out of 5 stars. Computer Gaming World in 1990 called DragonStrike "a superlative and innovative product" that appealed to both fantasy and simulation gamers, although the magazine wished that it could import Gold Box characters. In a 1992 survey of science fiction games, the magazine gave the title four of five stars, stating that as a clone of Dragonriders of Pern, it did not receive the attention unlike the latter; a 1994 survey of strategic space games set in the year 2000 and later gave the game three-plus stars.

A reviewer at GameSpy stated that "Westwood [Studios] was finally hitting its stride as a developer with another forgotten classic and badly underrated DragonStrike". The reviewer also said that the game "looked great for its time, with beautiful VGA graphics and primitive fractals used as a terrain engine, and unlike later dragonflight games, it rewarded thinking, strategizing, and taking the time to assess the situation before striking rather than pure reflexes" and that while the flight model was a bit simplistic, "DragonStrike is long overdue for a remake".

== See also ==
- I of the Dragon - another dragon-sim
- Magic Carpet - a game with similar gameplay
- Drakan: Order of the Flame
- Dragon Spirit - a top down scrolling shooter by Namco in which the player character is a blue dragon
- Dragon Saber - a sequel to the above
