= Dragonlance Adventures =

1987 role-playing game supplement by Tracy Hickman and Margaret Weis

- Cover of the first edition
- Author: Tracy Hickman & Margaret Weis
- Subject: Dungeons & Dragons rules
- Publisher: TSR
- Publication date: 1987
- ISBN: 0-88038-452-2
- OCLC: 17651951
- Dewey Decimal: 794 19
- LC Class: GV1469.62.D84 H53 1987

Dragonlance Adventures is a 128-page hardcover book for the Dragonlance campaign setting for the first edition of the Advanced Dungeons & Dragons fantasy role-playing game.

== Contents ==
Dragonlance Adventures is a supplement which details the history, characters, gods and races, monsters, and magic items of Krynn.

Dragonlance Adventures provides information for a Dungeon Master running adventures in Krynn, including how to create characters for the setting or import them from other campaigns. The book encourages players to create characters who adventure during or after the War of the Lance, or in the distant past before the Cataclysm. Options for player characters include the Knights of Solamnia, kender, gnomes, and Wizards of High Sorcery. The book introduces changes for magic-users which were later intended to be made in the second edition of AD&D, as well as a new alignment system similar to that of the AD&D game revision. Three pantheons of gods (good, evil, and neutral) are detailed, including the philosophies and structures, history, game statistics, godly Sphere of Influence, special powers granted to followers, and additional spells each god's follower gains over and above his daily allotments. Creatures native to Krynn are described, including the draconians, gully dwarves, shadowpeople, dreamwraiths, spectral minions, and thanoi. The Timeline of Krynn covers the major events of the world's past, from its creation through the War of the Lance, and details on the major personalities of the world's history are given along with game statistics.

== Publication history ==
Dragonlance Adventures was written by Tracy Hickman and Margaret Weis, with cover art by Jeff Easley and interior illustrations by George Barr, and was published by TSR in 1987 as a 128-page hardcover. Dragonlance Adventures was written in response to the desire of fans for all the background for the Dragonlance game world in one book.

This book was published in the same format as other Dungeons & Dragons manuals of its time.

== Reviews ==
- Casus Belli #41
- Australian Realms #1
