= Dragonlance: Fifth Age =

Tabletop fantasy role-playing game accessory

- Genre: Role-playing games
- Publisher: TSR
- Publication date: 1996
- Media type: Boxed set

Dragonlance: Fifth Age is an accessory for the SAGA System, published in 1996. It uses the setting of Dragonlance, which originally was used in the Advanced Dungeons & Dragons fantasy role-playing game.

== Contents ==
Dragonlance: Fifth Age is a diceless role-playing game, where players use cards instead of dice for character creation, determining whether characters succeed in their actions, and resolving encounters in combat. Each player holds a hand of cards with values on them from 1 at the lowest to 10 at the highest, with the size of a player's hand determined by how many adventures completed by that player's character. Any time a character needs to make a skill test or a combat chance resolved, the player plays a card and adds the value of the card to the appropriate attribute number; the character succeeds if the total is higher than the value determined by the gamemaster. The importance of the dramatic roles of characters in the Dragonlance saga is emphasized throughout the manual, and assumes that mundane actions such as purchasing standard gear are not necessary to role-play. The game features an open spell system rather than a set list of spells, where players describes what their heroes want to do using the magical abilities open to them, and the gamemaster decides how successful the hero is.

Dragonlance: Fifth Age was published in a boxed set, which contained three books, a deck of cards, a map of Krynn, a two-panel quick reference card, and eighteen character cards. The books were The Book of the Fifth Age, Dusk or Dawn, and Heroes of the New Age. The Fate deck was made up of eighty two cards in nine suits, with eight suits consisting of nine cards and the last one having ten.

=== Setting ===
This set takes place 30 years following the second Cataclysm of Krynn, with the old gods having abandoned Krynn after the destruction caused by Chaos. The game is based in the era known as the Fifth Age of Krynn, or the Age of Mortals. Dragon Overlords have taken over most of Ansalon, and killed the other dragons to take their lifeforce. Although the Dragon Lords remain in Ansalon, humans are now the dominant force. The old magic of the world is now gone, and creatures including the good dragons, silvanesti elves, and kender live in fear. The world is in chaos, as rival factions seek power while the Dragons desperately try to regain their control.

=== Adventure ===
The 48-page "Heroes of a New Age" booklet contains a sample adventure scenario intended for beginning heroes, who must defend against an attack by a green dragon, and explore their way through dwarven caverns to recover a valuable stolen gem.

=== Development ===
Dragonlance: Fifth Age was developed because TSR was looking to sell a non-Dungeons & Dragons type game.

Sue Weinlein Cook liked the idea of a more story based game.

== Publication history ==
Dragonlance: Fifth Age was published as a boxed set and released in 1996. Dragonlance: Fifth Age was written by William W. Connors and Sue Weinlein Cook. The set included three booklets (128 pages, 96 pages, and 48 pages), a deck of 82 Fate Cards, 18 character sheets depicting characters from the novels, and a map of Ansalon where the game takes place.

Dragonlance: Fifth Age was in planning before Dragons of Summer Flame was out.

Heroes of Steel is the first boxed expansion for the Dragonlance: Fifth Age campaign world.

== Reception ==
Paul Pettengale reviewed Dragonlance: Fifth Age for Arcane magazine, rating it an 8 out of 10 overall. He commented that "Dragonlance comes of age with the release of a game dedicated entirely to this heroic gameworld. And it's nothing like AD&D." He compares the Saga Rules System to AD&D: "Where AD&D is complex, verbose, highly detailed and rule-bound, the diceless Dragonlance system is flexible, quick and stresses the importance of playing heroic roles in the world of Kyrnn rather than replicating a quasi-reality and trouncing anything which is uglier than you are." He felt that using cards instead of dice "cuts out the randomness of dice throws, enabling the player to keep the high-point cards in his hand ready for when he really needs them." He explained that the changes in the setting make for "a turbulent, often bitter campaign world, but one in which the strong prevail" and noted that it is the players "who have enjoyed the novels who are most likely to revel in this game". He surmised that, despite the openness of things such as the spell system imply that an experienced referee is recommended to run this game, it is "a system that can be easily adapted by anyone - it gives you the freedom to get out of it exactly what you want, rather than pinning you down to a certain style of play". He concluded by saying: "Fifth Age is an able system, which stresses dynamic play, cuts out the randomness of dice throws, and which is set in a colourful campaign setting (with bags of novel-based background to draw on). It won't be to everyone's tastes, but I for one thought it was fun, fast and replicated the feel of what Dragonlance is all about."

In a review of Dragonlance: Fifth Age for Pyramid #23 (January/February 1997), the reviewer was originally skeptical of the game: "When Harold Johnson first told me about the new Dragonlance line early in 1996, I had my doubts. I was told that the Fifth Age line was to be a completely new card-based roleplaying system [...] Now that I have both read and played Dragonlance: Fifth Age, I can say that my initial reaction was dead wrong. Simply put, it's a darn fine game."

Dragonlance: Fifth Age was met with mixed feeling as it made many changes to the world of Krynn. Many of the complaints concerned dislike over the setting changes. Of Fifth Age's fans, some liked it for the same reason: that it moved the setting forward.

Financially, Fifth Age was a failure. TSR in the mid-90s had developed a reputation for not budgeting well and releasing a blizzard of products onto the market with little support or advertising. Whether TSR would have continued the project is unknown; as a more narrative-focused game, expansion material would inherently more involve the setting rather than the system. When the Wizards of the Coast acquisition of TSR closed in 1997, the first thing that Wizards did was take inventory of TSR's products, and stopped production of the money-losing ones. This included Fifth Age.

== Reviews ==
- Dragon #237
- Shadis #27
- Dragão Brasil
