= The Irda =

Novel by Linda P. Baker

- Cover of the first edition
- Language: English
- Genre: Fantasy novel
- Publication place: United States
- Media type: Print (Paperback)
- ISBN: 0-7869-0138-1

The Irda is a fantasy novel by Linda P. Baker, set in the world of Dragonlance, and based on the Dungeons & Dragons role-playing game. It is the second novel in the "Lost Histories" series. It was published in paperback in June 1995.

== Plot summary ==
The Irda (Children of the Stars) details the historical roots and struggles of the Irda, the high ogres of Krynn.

== Reviews ==
- Kliatt
