= Hederick the Theocrat =

Hederick the Theocrat is a fantasy novel by Ellen Dodge Severson, set in the world of Dragonlance, and based on the Dungeons & Dragons game.

== Reviews ==
- Kliatt
- Australian Realms #17
- Review by Pam Allan (1995) in ConNotations, Winter 1995
