= Night of Blood =

2003 novel by Richard A. Knaak

- Cover of the first edition
- Author: Richard A. Knaak
- Language: English
- Series: Minotaur Wars
- Genre: Fantasy novel
- Published: 2003
- Publication place: United States
- Media type: Print (Paperback)
- ISBN: 0-7869-2938-3

Night of Blood is a fantasy novel by Richard A. Knaak, set in the world of Dragonlance, and based on the Dungeons & Dragons role-playing game. It is the first novel in the "Minotaur Wars" series. It was published in paperback in June 2003.

== Plot summary ==
Night of Blood is a follow-up to The War of Souls trilogy, and deals with the minotaurs of Krynn.

== Review ==
- Chronicle
- Publishers Weekly
