= The Raistlin Chronicles =

Pair of novels

The Raistlin Chronicles is a pair of novels, The Soulforge and Brothers in Arms, set in the Dragonlance campaign setting of the Dungeons & Dragons fantasy role-playing game.

== The Soulforge ==
The Soulforge
- Author: Margaret Weis
- Cover artist: Larry Elmore
- Language: English
- Series: The Raistlin Chronicles
- Genre: Fantasy
- Publisher: Wizards of the Coast
- Publication date: January 1998
- Publication place: United States
- Media type: Print (Hardback & Paperback)
- Pages: 408
- ISBN: 0-7869-1314-2
- Followed by: Brothers in Arms

The Soulforge is a fantasy novel written by Margaret Weis and set in the Dragonlance campaign setting. The novel was first published in January 1998, and covers the early life of the character Raistlin Majere.

Margaret Weis has acknowledged Terry Phillip's The Soulforge gamebook for Advanced Dungeons & Dragons as the inspiration for the novel.

Power Metal band Blind Guardian wrote a song about The Soulforge, titled "The Soulforged", on their album A Night at the Opera.

=== Reviews ===
- Review by Wayne MacLaurin (1998) in SF Site, May 1998, (1998)

== Brothers in Arms ==
The Raistlin Chronicles
- Authors: Margaret Weis; Don Perrin
- Cover artist: Daniel Horne
- Language: English
- Series: The Raistlin Chronicles
- Genre: Fantasy
- Publisher: Wizards of the Coast
- Publication date: August 1999
- Publication place: United States
- Media type: Paperback
- Pages: 476
- ISBN: 0-7869-1429-7
- Preceded by: The Soulforge

Brothers in Arms is a Dragonlance book, the second of the Raistlin Chronicles, written by Margaret Weis and Don Perrin.

Brothers in Arms begins where The Soulforge left off, after Raistlin Majere has passed the Test of High Sorcery. Raistlin and Caramon Majere have decided to be hired as mercenaries, and are attempting to go to Langtree, the base of the army of Baron Ivor of Langtree. Antimodes goes with them part of the way. On the way, Raistlin's horse throws him while fording a river, and Raistlin catches pneumonia. He is taken to Haven, where he is healed by his friend, Lemuel. Antimodes leaves the brothers there. They winter in Haven, setting out in the spring towards Langtree.

At the same time, Kitiara uth Matar, the twins' sister, is in Sanction, trying to advance in the ranks of the Dragonarmy. To prove her worth, Ariakas sends her on a special mission: convince the red dragon Immolatus to come to Ariakas in Sanction, where he will receive orders from him. Kitiara succeeds, and the orders are to go to the city of Hope's End, and find the hiding place of the Gold and Silver Dragon Eggs.

Meanwhile, the twins have joined the Army of the Baron Ivor, and are trained: Raistlin as a war mage by Master Horkin, Caramon as a warrior. They also meet Scrounger, a half-kender and fellow recruit, and forge a friendship with him. Finally, they receive marching orders: the army has been hired by Good King Wilhelm of Blodehelm to destroy the city of Hope's End whose citizens have rebelled against the king.
