= The Art of the Dragonlance Saga =

- Language: English
- Publisher: TSR
- Publication date: 1987

The Art of the Dragonlance Saga is a 1987 book published by TSR.

== Contents ==
The Art of the Dragonlance Saga is a book in which an art book features 125 pages of color and black-and-white illustrations from TSR's artists, showcasing imagery from across the Dragonlance saga. The artwork previously appeared in adventure modules, calendars, and posters, with a few new production sketches included.

== Reception ==
James Wallis reviewed The Art of the Dragonlance Saga for Adventurer magazine and stated that "This book is a wonderful thing to own, but bear in mind that you could buy a new RPG for the same amount."

== Reviews ==
- G.M. The Independent Fantasy Roleplaying Magazine #2
