= The Annotated Chronicles =

2002 collection of fantasy stories

The Annotated Chronicles is a fantasy omnibus novel by Tracy Hickman and Margaret Weis, set in the world of Dragonlance, and based on the Dungeons & Dragons game.

== Plot summary ==
The Annotated Chronicles is a novel in which notes are included in the margins from the authors including an omnibus volume of Dragons of Autumn Twilight, Dragons of Winter Night, and Dragons of Spring Dawning.

== Reviews ==
- Science Fiction Chronicle
- Review by Gahan Wilson (2000) in Realms of Fantasy, February 2000
- Publishers Weekly
