= Heroes of Steel =

Role-playing game supplement

- Cover
- Genre: Role-playing game
- Publisher: TSR
- Media type: Print

Heroes of Steel is a supplement to the 2nd edition of the Advanced Dungeons & Dragons fantasy role-playing game.

== Contents ==
Heroes of Steel is the first boxed set published as an expansion to Dragonlance: Fifth Age, and consists of two books and a full color map. The first book adds guidelines on how to handle complicated actions, and the second book titled "The Rising Storm" consists of the first part of the Dragons of a New Age adventure series.

== Publication history ==
Heroes of Steel was published by TSR, Inc. in 1996.

== Reception ==
David Comford reviewed Heroes of Steel for Arcane magazine, rating it a 7 out of 10 overall. He commented that in the first book, "Shortcuts through unfamiliar territory, charging into combat, shield slamming an opponent and group activities can all be found. New weapons tables are included and both these and the rules are simple to grasp. Continuing with the focus on roleplaying over rules, book one includes bonus and penalty modifiers to inflict on your group should anyone not act in character." He continued, "However, Heroes is mainly a warriors sourcebook, and the first book delves into the roles available for fighters including the knightly orders of Takhisis, Solamnia and The Legion. Advantages and disadvantages accompany each, and all are highly playable." Comford concluded the review by saying, "The adventure is well planned, easily played and exciting, but it's over far too soon and should have been developed into a detailed campaign."

== Reviews ==
- Backstab (Issue 2 - Mar/Apr 1997)
- Casus Belli #101
