= Leaves from the Inn of the Last Home =

1987 role-playing game accessory by Tracy Hickman and Margaret Weis

- Author: Tracy Hickman and Margaret Weis
- Publisher: TSR
- Publication date: 1987

Leaves from the Inn of the Last Home is an accessory for the Advanced Dungeons & Dragons fantasy role-playing game.

== Contents ==
Leaves from the Inn of the Last Home is a collection of Dragonlance essays, legends, and recipes. Astinus of Palanthas discusses the creation of Krynn, Bertrem explains the difference between kender and gully dwarves, and Lord Gunthar shares his notes on dragon tactics. A short story by Weis and Hickman sheds light on the first meeting of Flint, Tanis, and the other Dragonlance companions.

Leaves from the Inn of the Last Home is a supplement which presents essays regarding the history of Krynn and the many races who live there. The book includes information about the main heroes of the Dragonlance series, as well as runic and numerological details regarding their personalities and backgrounds. It also includes information on herbalism and details the useful herbs of Krynn. The book contains a selection of poetry by author Michael Williams, with scores for accompaniment including a piece for Bass voice and the Bassoon. One section of the book is filled with extracts from the fictional cookbook of Tika Waylan.

== Publication history ==
Leaves from the Inn of the Last Home was edited by Margaret Weis and Tracy Hickman, and first published by TSR, Inc. in 1987. This is a 256-page soft-bound book, subtitled "The Complete Krynn Sourcebook". A revised edition, with additional material, was published in 1993.

== Reception ==
Phil Gallagher reviewed Leaves from the Inn of the Last Home for White Dwarf #91. He starts the review by saying "As the saying goes, 'All good things must come to an end' - but the Dragonlance series just goes on and on..." He cautions that fans of the epic series hoping for "all the information that should have been in DL5 Dragons of Mystery are going to be disappointed". He did note that a DM devoted to the setting would find the essays on the history of legends of Krynn and its races "invaluable in recreating the atmosphere of the place". He went on to say: "Unfortunately, all this praiseworthy material - splendidly illustrated and presented though it is - has been lumped together with an odd-ball assortment of Dragonlance trivia." Gallagher complained that with the "so-called 'authentic'" runic and numerological analyses of the Dragonlance heroes "no attempts are made to explain how such occult charts are generated or interpreted!" and that the section on herbalism included "no suggestions as to how these might be incorporated into the campaign or what their effects in terms of game mechanics might be". He concluded the review by saying: "You may have guessed that I'm not one of the greatest Dragonlance fans, and maybe my lack of involvement in the series is the reason why I can't see the relevance (or even the interest) of much of this material. Be that as it may, there is no way I can recommend this book to anyone other than Dragonlance fanatics and completists.

Rick Swan reviewed Leaves from the Inn of the Last Home for Dragon magazine #206 (June 1994). According to Swan, "this delightful collection [...] perfectly captures the fairy tale ambiance of the original novel trilogy". As for the recipes, he notes that "Flamestrike's Soup tastes like a beefy minestrone, bland but filling. Also, I'd substitute melted baking chocolate for the powdered cocoa in the Nuitari cookies."
