= The Soulforge =

Fantasy novel written by Margaret Weis

- Author: Margaret Weis
- Cover artist: Larry Elmore
- Language: English
- Series: Dragonlance: The Raistlin Chronicles
- Genre: Fantasy
- Publisher: Wizards of the Coast
- Publication date: January 1998
- Publication place: United States
- Media type: Print (hardback & paperback)
- Pages: 408 pp
- ISBN: 0-7869-1314-2
- Followed by: Brothers in Arms

The Soulforge is a fantasy novel written by Margaret Weis and set in the Dragonlance campaign setting. The novel was first published in January 1998, and covers the early life of the character Raistlin Majere.

== Plot summary ==
The story begins from Raistlin's childhood, and follows his progress through magic school. Many things occur that foreshadow the great power that he would one day attain, and offer an explanation as to why he is often vindictive and power hungry. The book concludes with Raistlin's test at the Tower of High Sorcery of Wayreth. The account of the test conflicts somewhat with a story that appeared in one of the books of the Dragonlance Legends trilogy, but gives a much more detailed account of how Raistlin came by his golden skin and hourglass eyes, and also how he bested the ancient archmage, Fistandantilus, from the time before the fall of Istar.

== Inspiration ==
Margaret Weis has acknowledged Terry Phillip's The Soulforge gamebook for Advanced Dungeons & Dragons as the inspiration for the novel.

== Cultural references ==
Power Metal band Blind Guardian wrote a song about the novel, titled "The Soulforged", on their album A Night at the Opera.

== Reviews ==
Review by Wayne MacLaurin (1998) in SF Site, May 1998, (1998)
