= Dragons of the Dwarven Depths =

2006 novel by Margaret Weis and Tracy Hickman

- Dragons of the Dwarven Depths book cover
- Authors: Tracy Hickman; Margaret Weis
- Cover artist: Matt Stawicki
- Language: English
- Series: The Lost Chronicles
- Genre: High fantasy
- Publisher: Wizards of the Coast
- Publication date: 2006 (mass market hardback and paperback)
- Publication place: United States
- Media type: Print (Hardcover and Paperback)
- Pages: 438
- ISBN: 978-0-7869-4099-8
- OCLC: 70216504
- Dewey Decimal: 813/.54 22
- LC Class: PS3573.E3978 D752 2006
- Followed by: Dragons of the Highlord Skies

Dragons of the Dwarven Depths is a fantasy novel by Margaret Weis and Tracy Hickman, set in the Dragonlance fictional campaign setting. It is the beginning of the Lost Chronicles trilogy, designed to fill in the gaps in the storyline between the books in the Chronicles trilogy (Dragons of Autumn Twilight, Dragons of Winter Night, and Dragons of Spring Dawning). The events in the book take place between the events of Dragons of Autumn Twilight and Dragons of Winter Night. While parts of the book foreshadow some of the events to take place in the Dragonlance Legends trilogy, the novel is otherwise free of spoilers.

== Publication history ==
Dragons of the Dwarven Depths was written by Margaret Weis and Tracy Hickman and published in May 2007.

== Plot introduction ==
The novel is set in the period between Dragons of Autumn Twilight and Dragons of Winter Night. The book continues with the adventures of the Heroes of the Lance, after they free the slaves from Pax Tharkas. The title alludes to the plot of the book, as the heroes must enter Thorbardin in order to obtain the Hammer of Kharas. The heroes are trying to lead the refugees to safety in Thorbardin, as well as attempting to obtain the Hammer of Kharas. All the while, they are being pursued by the Dragonarmy. Although the story includes the Companions, its main focus is on Flint Fireforge and his choices.

== Plot summary ==
After the Companions help the slaves escape and kill the Dragon Highlord Verminaard, they lead the refugees into a defensible valley for the winter. Debate begins on what to do next; whereas some would prefer to wait out winter in the valley, others feel the proximity to Pax Tharkas leaves them too vulnerable to attacks from the Dragonarmies. With rumours and legends of the dwarven kingdom of Thorbardin present in their minds, the Companions set out in search of some entrance to the fabled kingdom. Raistlin Majere, Caramon Majere, and Sturm Brightblade head to Skullcap, while Flint Fireforge and Tanis Half-Elven head towards a secret dwarven pass leading to Thorbardin.

Finding an enchanted helm, Sturm unlocks the key to entering the dwarven kingdom. While Tanis and Flint find a path for the refugees to follow to the gates of Thorbardin, the refugees themselves are taken along the path, led by Riverwind, when the Dragonarmy attacks their camp. The refugees flee into a mountain pass and, using an old dwarven trap, close the pass so that the Dragonarmy cannot follow.

The Companions, meanwhile, enter the gates of Thorbardin and are immediately captured by a group of dwarves who are horrified to see the enchanted helm that Sturm uncovered in Skullcap, proclaiming that it is cursed. They arrest the Heroes of the Lance under suspicion of being the vanguard of an invading army, and take them before the dwarven council. Some of the dwarven council are under the influence of the Dragonarmy and are supplying it with much-needed steel for weapons. Flint is persuaded to help Arman Kharas, the self-proclaimed reincarnation of the ancient dwarven hero Kharas, to retrieve the legendary Hammer of Kharas, on condition that his friends be released regardless of what happens to him.

Tanis, Sturm, Caramon and Raistlin fake death after the dwarven guards give them poisoned mushrooms for their dinner, and manage to overcome the draconians and dwarves that examine the 'corpses'. Taking a draconian as proof that the Dragonarmy is at the gates of Thorbardin, they manage to show the thane of the Hylar clan of the conspiracy between the Theiwar, Daergar and the Dragonarmy before the draconian escapes.

Meanwhile, Arman Kharas and Flint, followed by Tasslehoff Burrfoot, enter the sacred valley of thanes to retrieve the Hammer of Kharas from the tomb of Kharas. Flint struggles internally over the fate of the Hammer, as it is needed to forge the legendary dragonlances, but can also unite the dwarven clans under one leader, putting to rest the risk of civil war developing in the kingdom. Retrieving the Hammer, Flint, Arman and Tasslehoff join the dwarven thanes in the Temple of the Stars, only to be attacked by draconian forces, allied with the Theiwar dwarves. The dwarven forces, supported by the disillusioned Daergar clan, overcome the invading draconians and, regaining the Hammer, the icon of their race, graciously provide the human refugees with shelter.

== Background ==
There was a fifteen-year hiatus between novels about the Companions before Dragons of the Dwarven Depths was released. After the original Chronicles novels were completed in 1991, co-authors Margaret Weis and Tracy Hickman had a lot of material about them remaining, but moved on to writing about new characters. In 2004, Weis told Hickman she wanted to return to the main protagonists of the Dragonlance world. When the pair contacted their editors, they enthusiastically agreed.

Weis described the experience of returning to writing about the characters as "like going back and meeting old friends". She said that while it was satisfying to return to the Companions, it was also difficult, as she had forgotten many details of the stories over the years. She got in touch with and received significant help from the series' large fan base, who, she said, "know more about it than I do."

== Reception ==
The print version of the book reached the top 300 of the national bestseller list in August 2006. The audiobook version of Dragons of the Dwarven Depths received very positive reviews. Narrator Sandra Burr's performance received mixed reviews, with Kliatt magazine saying that the author "captures the nuances of these well-known characters through her range of accents, growls, and tones," while Internet Bookwatch wrote that the novel "comes to life under veteran Sandra Burr's voice as it provides a fast-paced fantasy listen."

Reviewer Lance Eaton disagreed, calling Burr's performance "disappointing", continuing that while her general narration is adequate, her character voices are "comical caricatures". Eaton said the story itself "evokes ambivalence". While he enjoyed the feelings of nostalgia the book provoked, he said that in places the story feels forced, with too much foreshadowing of future events. He also said readers new to the series would be confused by events, though old fans would "finish sooner than they want".

Heather Dieffenbach, reviewing the audiobook for the School Library Journal, commented that "This recording will be in demand by fans of the previous books, but it will not draw in new listeners."
