= Intermittent rhythmic delta activity =

Type of abnormal brain wave

Intermittent rhythmic delta activity (IRDA) is a type of brain wave abnormality found in electroencephalograms (EEG).

== Types ==
It can be classified based on the area of brain it originates from:

- frontal (FIRDA)
- occipital (OIRDA)
- temporal (TIRDA)

It can also be

- Unilateral
- Bilateral

== Cause ==
It can be caused by a number of different conditions, some benign, unknown reasons, but also is commonly associated with lesions, tumors, and encephalopathies. Association with periventricular white matter disease and cortical atrophy has been documented and they are more likely to show up during acute metabolic derangements such as uremia and hyperglycemia.

== Diagnosis ==
Intermittent rhythmic delta activity (IRDA) is diagnosed on routine scalp EEG by visually identifying brief trains of rhythmic delta (≈1–4 Hz) with relatively uniform morphology that recur intermittently against an otherwise typical background. Assessment includes confirming the topography (frontal, occipital, or temporal predominance), reactivity to state or stimuli (often accentuated in drowsiness and attenuated by alerting or eye opening), and absence of ictal evolution (progressive change in frequency, amplitude, or spatial spread).

Diagnostic interpretation depends on the regional pattern:

- FIRDA (frontal IRDA): frontally maximal, usually a nonspecific marker of diffuse cerebral dysfunction (e.g., toxic–metabolic encephalopathy, raised intracranial pressure), though unilateral FIRDA may indicate focal pathology.
- OIRDA (occipital IRDA): posterior-dominant rhythmic delta, classically in children; often attenuates with eye opening and is frequently associated with idiopathic generalized epilepsies (e.g., childhood absence epilepsy).
- TIRDA (temporal IRDA): rhythmic delta confined to one or both temporal regions, typically in drowsiness/light sleep; has strong lateralizing value and is associated with temporal lobe epilepsy.

Because IRDA is defined by intermittency and regional predominance, common mimics must be excluded during interpretation, including generalized rhythmic delta activity (GRDA), polymorphic delta slowing, periodic discharges, benign variants such as subclinical rhythmic EEG discharges of adults (SREDA), and ocular or movement artifacts; evaluation across bipolar and referential montages with EOG/ECG channels and alerting maneuvers is recommended.

Case-based literature illustrates typical recognition and clinical correlation, including attenuation with eye opening and associations with systemic/metabolic disturbances or intracranial pressure changes.

== Use of automated and quantitative EEG tools ==
Commercial quantitative EEG (qEEG) packages and research algorithms are increasingly used to assist recognition of rhythmic delta activity during review, but they do not by themselves establish a diagnosis of intermittent rhythmic delta activity (IRDA). Most systems compute rhythmicity/periodicity trends and automatically flag rhythmic delta activity (RDA) according to the American Clinical Neurophysiology Society (ACNS) critical care EEG terminology; the final determination of intermittency, regional predominance (frontal/occipital/temporal), and reactivity requires expert visual interpretation of the raw EEG.

Contribution to workflow

Several tools (e.g., NeuroTrend/encevis and comparable qEEG displays) can screen long recordings by highlighting segments with rhythmic/periodic patterns, directing the reviewer to likely RDA runs that may represent IRDA when intermittent and regionally maximal. Prospective and retrospective studies demonstrate that such tools can improve time efficiency for screening continuous EEG while preserving clinically useful detection of rhythmic/periodic patterns when coupled with expert review.

Reported efficacy

qEEG-assisted review can reach moderate-to-high accuracy for clinically prioritized endpoints. In ICU cohorts, expert interpretation of qEEG displays plus targeted raw review identified seizures with sensitivities around 63–68% and low false-positive rates per hour; trained ICU nurses using qEEG achieved higher screening sensitivity with good specificity, enabling rapid triage before physician confirmation. Studies focused specifically on automated recognition of rhythmic/periodic patterns (RPPs) report that algorithmic flags help reviewers detect ACNS-defined RDA and related patterns under strict time limits, supporting screening use cases.

Limitations

Automated systems generally detect RDA broadly rather than diagnosing IRDA subtypes; determining intermittency, topography (FIRDA/OIRDA/TIRDA), and state dependence (e.g., eye-opening attenuation) still requires human assessment. Performance varies by vendor, settings, and patient population; artifacts and non-ictal rhythmic phenomena can trigger false positives, and sensitivity may decline for low-amplitude or slowly evolving patterns. Most validation studies prioritize seizure or generic RPP detection rather than IRDA specifically, so external validity for IRDA classification is limited.

Guidance for use

Professional guidance recommends that automated/qEEG outputs supplement, not replace expert review of the raw EEG and that pattern labels conform to ACNS terminology. Suggested practices include: (i) use qEEG/rhythmicity trends to triage long recordings and surface candidate segments; (ii) verify intermittency, field, and reactivity on the raw tracings across bipolar and referential montages; (iii) document findings using standardized ACNS terms; and (iv) integrate results with clinical context and neuroimaging. Continuous EEG and qEEG screening are endorsed for critically ill patients, with staffing/training to ensure that automated detections receive timely expert confirmation.
