= Dan Willis (author) =

American author

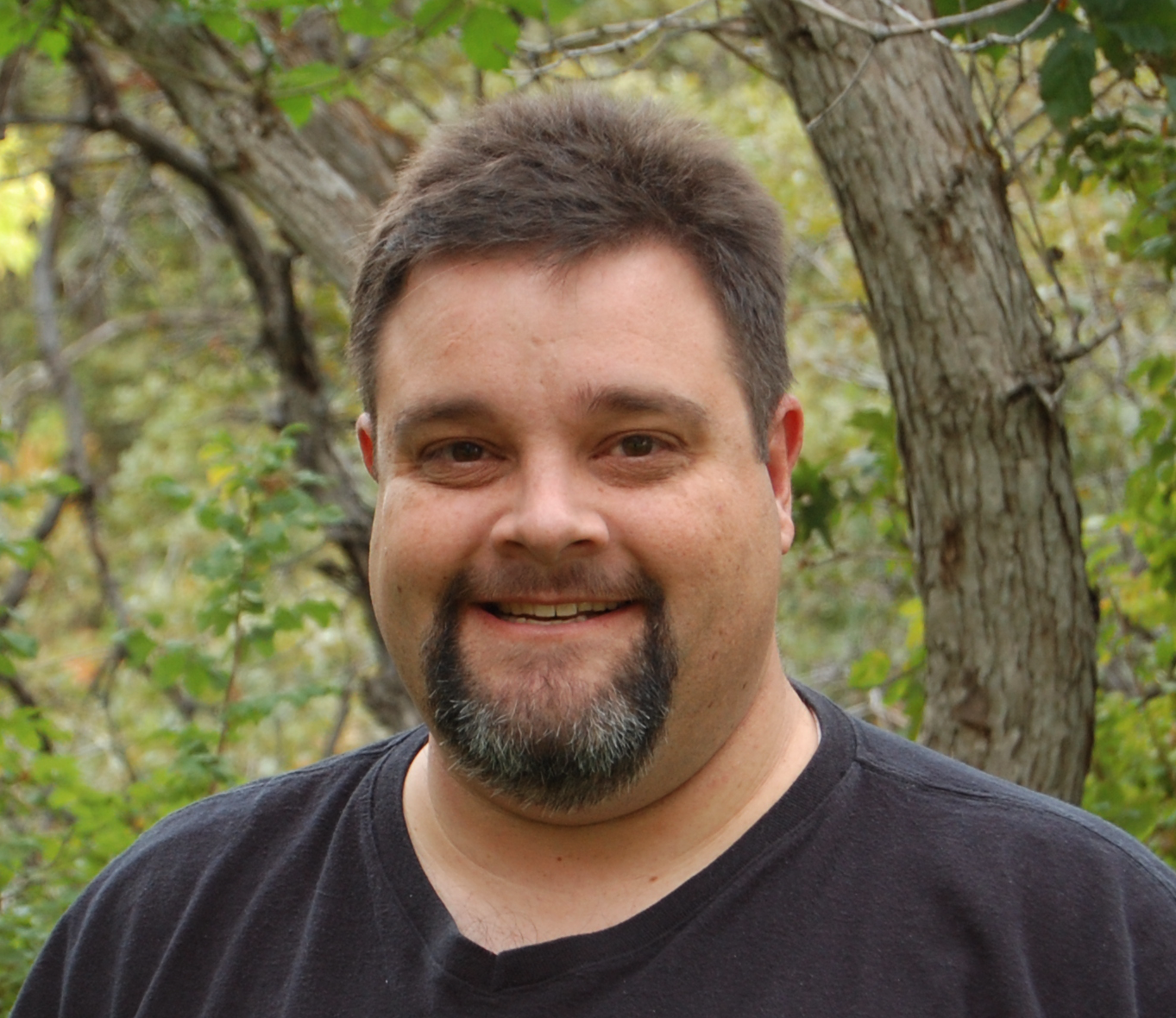
- Born: Washington, D.C., U.S.
- Occupation: Writer
- Writing career
- Genre: Fantasy
- Website: www.danwillisauthor.com

Dan Willis is an American author of young adult and other fantasy novels in the Dragonlance series created by Margaret Weis and Tracy Hickman. He lives in Utah.

== Biography ==
His Dragonlance fantasy novels were his first books published by a major publisher, and his first young adult works as well. All three of his Dragonlance: The New Adventures books are on the accelerated reading list for a junior high school in Utah.

Willis lives in Utah with his wife and four children. In addition to writing, Willis is a web designer and columnist, and a computer programmer.

== Bibliography ==
=== Novels ===
Dragonlance: The New Adventures series
Written for readers age 10 and up.

- The Dragon Well (vol.3), ISBN 0-7869-3354-2, September 1, 2004. The Dragon Well was Willis's first young adult novel.
- Dragon Knight (vol.7), ISBN 0-7869-3735-1, May 3, 2005
- Wizard's Return (Trinistyr Trilogy vol.3), ISBN 0-7869-4025-5, May 9, 2006

The Anvil of Time series

- The Survivors (vol.2), ISBN 0-7869-4723-3, November 4, 2008

The Shattered West series

- The Flux Engine (vol.1), ISBN 978-1482762792, April 16, 2013

Arcane Casebook series
Dead Letter, a prequel to the series, was released in December 2018.

1. In Plain Sight (December 2018, ISBN 978-1-72914-250-9)
2. Ghost of a Chance (March 2019, ISBN 978-1-79750-165-9)
3. The Long Chain (September 2019, ISBN 978-1-68809-872-5)
4. Mind Games (February 2020, ISBN 979-8610878003)
5. Limelight (May 2020, ISBN 979-8648666023)
6. Blood Relations (October 2020, ISBN 979-8551184676)
7. Capital Murder (April 2021, ISBN 979-8734651919)
8. Hostile Takeover (forthcoming, April 2022)

=== Short works ===
- "Lake of Death", pp. 127–152, collected in The Search for Power: Dragons from the War of Souls, edited by Margaret Weis, ISBN 0-7869-3193-0, 2004-05-01

== Critical reception ==
Dragon Knight, the seventh volume in an eight-volume series, has been described as the best in the series. The Dragon Well was given a 2Q (out of 3Q) by Geri Diorio of the Voice of Youth Advocates, a professional journal for librarians.
