= War of the Lance (video game) =

1989 video game

- Cover art by Jeff Easley
- Developer: Strategic Simulations, Inc.
- Publishers: NA: Strategic Simulations, Inc.; EU: U.S. Gold
- Designers: David Landrey; Chuck Kroegel
- Platforms: MS-DOS, Commodore 64, Apple II
- Release: 1989 (Apple II); 1990 (DOS & Commodore 64)
- Genre: Strategy game
- Modes: Single-player, multiplayer

War of the Lance is a strategy game developed by Strategic Simulations, Inc. in 1989, based on the Advanced Dungeons & Dragons Dragonlance campaign setting. The gameplay is based on the War of the Lance in the Dragonlance series.

== Gameplay ==
War of the Lance is presented in a top-down view. In single player mode, the player plays the Whitestone side to fight the evil forces of the Highlord (controlled by the computer). In a two-player game, the second player plays as the Highlord forces.

This game is a turn-based strategy game. The player controls various units and heroes of an army against enemy forces. The game can be won in two ways. The player can win by controlling the enemy capitals (the Highlord capital is Neraka, and the Whitestone capitals are the four Knight-countries: Solanthus, Caergoth, Gunthar, and Northern Ergoth), plus the Clerist Tower near Palanthus. If neither side can capture the enemy capitals by the end of the game (Mar/Apr 354 AC), the side with more points (calculated from the size of their forces) wins. Each game-year has five turns.

== Plot ==
The game can be played with one of two starting-points. The Campaign game starts at the beginning of the year 348 AC, with the Highlord controlling Neraka only, and the Whitestone Alliance not even formed yet. The Whitestone player will need to build it up from scratch.

The Scenario game starts in the year 349 AC, with each side having possession of a few countries, and the Whitestone player starting the game in medias res, during the height of the war. In particular, one of the Whitestone countries, elven Silvanesti, will be besieged by a swarm of dragon and enemy troops.

== Reception ==
War of the Lance was unsuccessful for SSI, with approximately 15,255 copies of the game ultimately being sold. The game was reviewed in 1990 in Dragon Magazine #158 by Hartley, Patricia, and Kirk Lesser in "The Role of Computers" column. The reviewers gave the game four out of five stars.

According to GameSpy, War of the Lance is "a proud addition to SSI's legacy" and "is still fun to play today".
