= Dan Parkinson (author) =

American novelist

Daniel Edward Parkinson (March 19, 1935 – May 10, 2001) was an American author who produced over 40 books published in several genres, including naval fiction, westerns (over twenty, of which three were published posthumously), science fiction and fantasy novels. He was born in Liberal, Kansas.

== Westerns ==
- The Texians (1980)
- Slanted Colt (1984)
- Blood Arrow (1985)
- Calamity Trail (1985)
- Brother Wolf (1985)
- The Sundown Breed (1986)
- Thunderland (1987)
- Shadow of the Hawk (1988)
- The Way to Wyoming (1988)
- Gunpowder Glory (1988)
- The Westering (1988)
- A Man Called Wolf (1989)
- Ride the Devil's Trail (1990)
- Drifter's Luck (1991)
- Dust on the Wind (1992)
- The Guns of No Man's Land (1992)
- The Last Long Rifle (1995)
- Silver Spur (2004)
- Jubilation Gap (2004)
- Summer Land (2004)

== The Patrick Dalton Series ==
His naval fiction included a series featuring the character Patrick Dalton and is set during the American War of Independence. Dalton is an Irishman and a lieutenant in the Royal Navy, falsely accused of treason. Throughout the four-volume series, Dalton remains loyal to Britain. Unfortunately, Parkinson died in 2001, and so did not have an opportunity to write one (or more) subsequent novels that would have resolved a number of open issues.

- The Fox and The Faith (Apr 1987)

This novel is set in 1777. After Dalton is accused of treason, he escapes from British-held New York in the schooner Faith.

- The Fox and The Fury (May 2000)

Still on the run, and still loyal to Britain, Dalton acquires a ketch, and a cargo of cannon from the Chesapeake. He then faces an array of enemies: the Royal Navy, the British Army, rebel privateers and navy, loyalist raiders, and Spanish pirates. Dalton eventually captures the Fury.

- The Fox and The Flag (May 1990)

Dalton avers his loyalty to the Flag, despite still being sought for treason. Dalton, in his vessel Fury, escorts merchant ships through North American waters, protecting them from English and rebel ships.

- The Fox and The Fortune (Feb 2001)

This novel is set in 1778. In the novel Dalton fights a pirate who has taken advantage of the disorder that the American War of Independence has caused to prey on merchant vessels.

== The Dwarven Nations Series ==
- The Covenant of the Forge (Feb 1993).
- Hammer and Axe (July 1993).
- The Swordsheath Scroll (Jan 1994).
- The Gates of Thorbardin (1990)
- The Gully Dwarves (1996)

== The Gates of Time Series ==
- The Whispers (Apr 1998).
- Faces of Infinity (Mar 1999).
- Paradox Gate (Sept 1999).

== Timecop Series ==
Parkinson wrote adventure spin-off trilogy based on ABC's short-lived Timecop series, which was inspired by the successful Jean-Claude Van Damme film, Timecop, from Universal Studios. The trilogy continues the adventures of TEC agent Jack Logan as he hunts down rogue travelers and brings them to justice before they can alter the past.

Title	Original Year of Publication	Publisher
The Scavenger	August 1998	Del Rey
Viper’s Spawn	September 1998	Del Rey
Blood Ties	March 1999	Del Rey
