= Michael Williams (author) =

American author

Michael Williams is an American author. He is known as an author of Dragonlance novels.

== Biography ==
Williams was born and lives in Louisville, Kentucky. He has lived in Vermont, New York, New Jersey, Wisconsin, Ireland and England. Approximately 200 people left TSR due to rounds of layoffs that occurred between 1983 and 1984; as a result Williams joined CEO John Rickets, as well as Mark Acres, Andria Hayday, Gaye Goldsberry O'Keefe, Gali Sanchez, Garry Spiegle, Carl Smith, and Stephen D. Sullivan in founding the game company Pacesetter on January 23, 1984. His first novel, Weasel's Luck, was published in 1988, followed by Galen Beknighted (1990), Arcady (1996), Allamanda (1997), Trajan's Arch (2010) and Vine: An Urban Legend (2012). His novel Dominic's Ghosts was published through Seventh Star Press in August 2018 followed by a re-issue of Vine: An Urban Legend in October 2018.

== Novels ==
=== Original works ===
==== From Thief To King ====
- A Sorcerer's Apprentice (1990) – ISBN 0-445-21054-0
- A Forest Lord (1991) – ISBN 0-446-36146-1
- The Balance of Power (1992) – ISBN 0-446-36244-1

==== City Quartet ====
- Trajan's Arch (2010) – ISBN 978-0-9827149-4-2
- Vine: An Urban Legend (2012) – ISBN 978-1-61318-125-6
- Dominic's Ghosts (2018) – ISBN 978-1-948042-58-1
- Tattered Men (2019) – ISBN 978-1-948042-86-4

==== Arcady ====
- Arcady (1996) – ISBN 0-451-45598-3
- Allamanda (1997) – ISBN 0-451-45609-2

=== Franchise ===
==== Dragonlance novels ====
- Dragonlance Heroes Vol 3: Weasel's Luck (1988) – ISBN 0-88038-625-8
- Dragonlance Heroes Vol 3, II: Galen Beknighted (1990) – ISBN 0-88038-921-4
- Dragonlance Meetings 4: The Oath and the Measure (1992) – ISBN 1-56076-336-1, sequel to the previous two novels.
- Dragonlance Villains Vol 1: Before the Mask (1993) – ISBN 0-09-931571-8 ISBN 1-56076-583-6
- Dragonlance Villains Vol 6: The Dark Queen (1994) – ISBN 1-56076-925-4
