= Dragonlance =

Dungeons & Dragons fictional campaign setting

- The original Dragonlance logo
- Designers: Margaret Weis and Laura and Tracy Hickman
- Publishers: TSR, Inc. Wizards of the Coast Sovereign Press
- Publication: March 1984; 42 years ago
- Years active: 1984–2011, 2022–present
- Genres: Fantasy
- Languages: English
- Systems: AD&D 1st/2nd Edition SAGA System D&D 3.5 Edition D&D 5th Edition
- Chance: Dice rolling
- Media type: Novels, game accessories, film, audiobooks

Dragonlance is a shared universe created by the American fantasy writers Laura and Tracy Hickman, and expanded by Tracy Hickman and Margaret Weis under the direction of TSR, Inc. into a series of fantasy novels. The Hickmans conceived Dragonlance while driving in their car on the way to TSR for a job interview. Tracy Hickman met his future writing partner Margaret Weis at TSR, and they gathered a group of associates to play the Dungeons & Dragons role-playing game. The adventures during that game inspired a series of gaming modules, a series of novels, licensed products such as board games, and lead miniature figures.

In 1984, TSR published the first Dragonlance game module, Dragons of Despair, and the first novel, Dragons of Autumn Twilight. The novel began the Chronicles trilogy, a core element of the Dragonlance world. While the authoring team of Tracy Hickman and Margaret Weis wrote the setting's central books, numerous other authors contributed novels, short stories and game supplements to the setting. Over 190 novels have used the Dragonlance setting; the Dragonlance campaign setting has also been used for multiple editions of Dungeons & Dragons and for the SAGA System. Following Wizards of the Coast's acquisition of TSR in 1997, Wizards licensed Dragonlance to Margaret Weis's company Sovereign Press to produce game materials; this licensing agreement ran from 2001 to 2007. Dragonlance returned in 2022 with a new adventure module and the start of a new novel trilogy.

The fictional Dragonlance world of Krynn contains numerous characters, an extensive timeline, and a detailed geography. The history of Krynn consists of five ages. The novels and related game products are primarily set in the fourth age, The Age of Despair. Since the publication of Dragonlance: Fifth Age in 1996, the fifth age, the Age of Mortals, has been used. The Heroes of the Lance, created by Weis and Hickman, are the popular protagonists of the Chronicles trilogy. Along with D&D's world of the Forgotten Realms, Dragonlance is one of the most popular shared worlds in fiction.

== Publication history ==
=== Creation ===
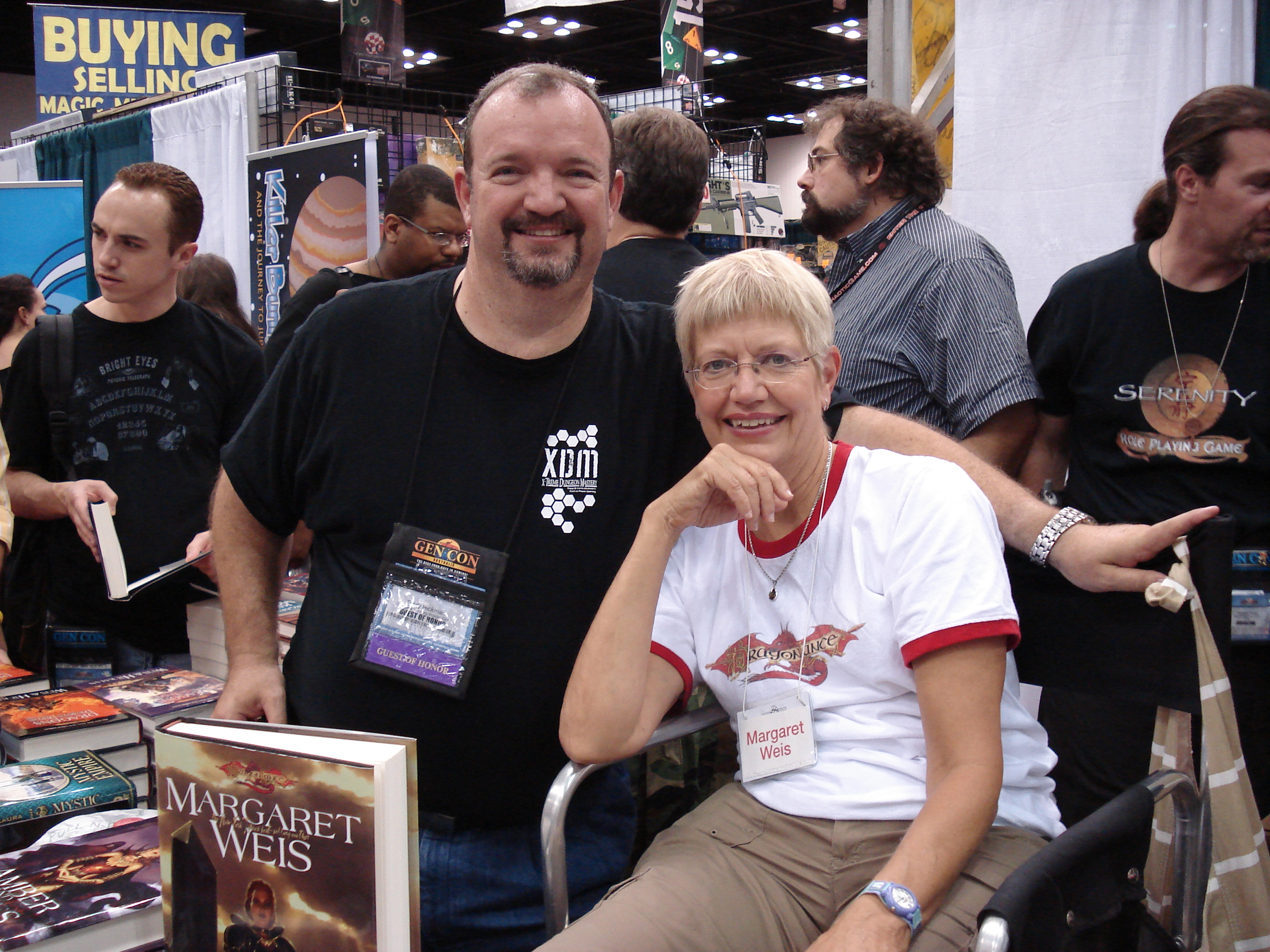
Tracy Hickman and Margaret Weis at Gen Con 2008

Hickman developed his world creation technique by writing and self-publishing with his wife Laura the adventure modules Rahasia (1979) and Pharaoh (1980), and writing TSR's Ravenloft module (1983). He was unemployed in 1982, and TSR offered him a job based on his submission of several modules. That year, while driving from Utah to Wisconsin to start a job with TSR, Hickman and his wife created the Dragonlance universe concept. During the trip, Hickman and his wife discussed two ideas they had had for several years: an entire world used to support a storyline, and a world dominated by dragons.

Their ideas were well received by TSR, whose marketing department felt they had enough dungeons, but not enough dragons. Hickman suggested a series of twelve modules, each featuring a different dragon. TSR employee Harold Johnson suggested that Hickman should try to get additional support from other TSR staff members and, after a period of months, Hickman had the support of Jeff Grubb, Larry Elmore, Roger Moore, Doug Niles, Michael Williams, and others with whom they discussed ideas for the project. Meanwhile, Weis was editing and writing various Endless Quest books for TSR. The Dragonlance group decided that novels should accompany the game modules; TSR reluctantly agreed and hired a writer. Hickman became the design coordinator for Project Overlord, the cover name for what would later be known as the Dragonlance saga.

TSR decided to create a franchise, including modules, board games, lead figures, and - for the first time - novels. Weis had been hired as an editor; with Hickman, she began working with the author hired to write the novels. They weren't satisfied with the author, and decided they should be the ones to write the books. They collaborated over a weekend, writing the prologue for the first five chapters of the first novel, Dragons of Autumn Twilight, based on the module Dragons of Despair. TSR liked their treatment and gave them the assignment, firing the author. After two years of development, TSR released the module Dragons of Despair and the novel Dragons of Autumn Twilight in March and November 1984, respectively. TSR had doubts about the finished novel's sales potential, and attempted to order thirty thousand copies, ultimately ordering the minimum print run of fifty thousand. The success of the novel prompted TSR to publish more copies to meet demand. The novel was written after the completion of the first Dragonlance game modules. Weis and Hickman felt this was constraining and made the novel feel too episodic, so they reversed the process for the next books and completed the novels before the related modules were written. Dragonlance received support products such as novels, calendars, computer games, and books of artwork.

=== Further development ===
The second Dragonlance logo, used on most of the books and supplements since 1995 with the 5th Age

In the mid to late 1980s, a rift developed between TSR and the authors. Weis and Hickman were feeling under-appreciated and, when TSR turned down their Darksword series of novels, they went to Bantam Books. Bantam made them an offer, which they accepted, and they stopped writing Dragonlance novels for TSR. They returned to write Dragons of Summer Flame for TSR in 1995, thinking it would be their final Dragonlance novel. At the time, Dragonlance gaming had been converted to the SAGA System, with limited success, and that, combined with TSR's general financial troubles, put the setting's future in doubt. Wizards of the Coast bought the troubled TSR in 1997, and Weis and Hickman then proposed the War of Souls trilogy, which was published in 2000-2002. All three novels made the New York Times bestseller list, and the setting was commercially revitalized. By 1998, the original Dragonlance trilogy had sold well over three million copies worldwide and spawned dozens of sequels. The central books of the Dragonlance series were written by the authoring team of Weis and Hickman, but many other writers have made contributions, including Richard A. Knaak, Douglas Niles, Roger E. Moore, Don Perrin, Jean Rabe, Paul B. Thompson, Tonya C. Cook, Michael Williams, Nancy Varian Berberick, and Chris Pierson.

In 2001, Wizards of the Coast licensed Sovereign Press to publish further Dragonlance game materials. This began with the newly revised Dragonlance Campaign Setting in 2003, which used the new Dungeons & Dragons 3rd Edition rules. In April 2007, Wizards of the Coast had not renewed Sovereign's license, and Dragonlance RPG game supplements and accessories were only released through the end of the year.

In October 2020, Weis and Hickman filed suit against Wizards of the Coast for breaching a licensing deal with Weis and Hickman for a new Dragonlance novel trilogy. Boing Boing reported that "according to the lawsuit, Weis and Hickman agreed with Wizards of the Coast to produce the new novels in 2017, capping off the series and giving fans a final sendoff, but the company pulled the plug in August 2020". In December, Weis and Hickman filed to voluntarily dismiss without prejudice their lawsuit, and "the filing noted that Wizards of the Coast had not formally answered their lawsuit, nor had they filed for a summary judgement". Weis and Hickman's publishing agent affirmed a few weeks following this that a new trilogy of Dragonlance novels was in the works; the first of the new trilogy was released in August 2022.

In December 2022, the first Dragonlance adventure module, titled Dragonlance: Shadow of the Dragon Queen, for 5th Edition was released. The module is set during the War of the Lance; Wizards of the Coast has stated that the module does not require prior knowledge of the setting or the novels to play the module. An integrated board game, titled Dragonlance: Warriors of Krynn, was released in 2023, designed by Stephen Baker and Rob Daviau. Dragonlance: Warriors of Krynn is a wargame that focuses on military battles during the War of the Lance. Both games can be played independently, but the adventure module includes rules for using the board game to resolve the military battles that occur in the narrative.

== Media ==
=== Campaign setting ===
Dragonlance Adventures, the first Dragonlance campaign setting sourcebook

TSR created Dragonlance as a campaign setting for the Advanced Dungeons & Dragons (AD&D) roleplaying game in 1982, publishing the first of a series of modules, Dragons of Despair, in March 1984. They published the first world-spanning sourcebook, Dragonlance Adventures, in 1987. When AD&D was updated to the 2nd edition in 1989, the Dragonlance campaign setting was updated as well. However, in 1996, Dragonlance was converted to use the new SAGA System, which uses cards to determine the effects of actions, with the publication of the Dragonlance: Fifth Age roleplaying game.

When the 3rd edition of Dungeons & Dragons was released in 2000, Dragonlance was not initially updated for the new edition. In 2002, Margaret Weis's company Sovereign Press acquired the license to publish 3rd Edition Dragonlance material. The official update, Dragonlance Campaign Setting, was published in 2003 for the 3.5 Edition. Wizards of the Coast turned over all responsibility for maintaining the Dragonlance setting to Sovereign Press until 2007. The campaign setting was not supported during the 4th Edition era (2008-2013) of Dungeons & Dragons.

In March 2022, Wizards released the PDF Heroes of Krynn which is part of the "Unearthed Arcana" public playtest series for the 5th Edition of Dungeons & Dragons. Polygon commented that this "all but confirmed" the return of the Dragonlance setting. The setting was revisited in December 2022 with a new adventure module for the 5th Edition. On December 6, Wizards released the adventure book Dragonlance: Shadow of the Dragon Queen.

=== Novels ===
The main storyline of the original Dragonlance series has been predominantly written by Margaret Weis and Tracy Hickman.

- The Chronicles trilogy relates the events since the meeting of the Companions until the end of the War of the Lance and the defeat of the Dragonarmies of Ansalon.
- The Lost Chronicles trilogy is a companion to the original Chronicles. Each book of the trilogy tells a story hinted at in the Chronicles but previously left untold.
- The Legends trilogy covers the Blue Lady's War, as well as the past adventures of Raistlin and Caramon Majere, culminating in Raistlin's attempt to achieve godhood.
- The Raistlin Chronicles is a two-book series (The Soulforge and Brothers in Arms), that follow the early life of Raistlin Majere, with his twin brother Caramon and their half-sister Kitiara uth Matar, on his journey from sickly child to powerful mage.
- The Second Generation is a single compilation book with five novellas that tell the stories of the children of the original Companions. This book is considered to be part of the main storyline, and develops characters that would later be seen in the War of Souls.
- Dragons of Summer Flame covers the Chaos War, also known as the Second Cataclysm. The gods and mortals join forces to defeat Chaos in his attempt to destroy Krynn, resulting in the withdrawal of Chaos and the gods of Krynn.
- Kang's Regiment consists of two novels (The Doom Brigade and Draconian Measures), which tell the story of Kang and his draconian regiment following the end of the War of the Lance and into the aftermath of the Chaos War. The series explores the draconians' search for identity, legitimacy, and a homeland.
- The Destinies trilogy follows Destina Rosethorn, a noblewoman who embarks on a dangerous quest involving time travel, bringing her into conflict with legendary figures and disrupting the balance of the world.
- Dragons in the Archives: The Best of Weis and Hickman Anthology is another compilation of short stories which were previously published in other anthologies. These stories take place at different points of time in the world of Krynn. This book provides backstory to some of the characters and situations presented in the War of Souls trilogy.
- The War of Souls trilogy begins as a strange storm courses through Krynn, heralding the War of Souls. The end of the war brings the return of the gods, Takhisis's death, and the departure of Paladine.
- The Dark Disciple trilogy follows the death of Takhisis and the departure of Paladine, when the lesser gods strive to maintain dominance.

=== Video games ===
Dragonlance video games
| 1988 | Heroes of the Lance (Silver Box) |
| 1989 | Dragons of Flame (Silver Box) |
| 1989 | War of the Lance |
| 1990 | DragonStrike |
| 1990 | Champions of Krynn (Gold Box) |
| 1991 | Shadow Sorcerer (Silver Box) |
| 1991 | Death Knights of Krynn (Gold Box) |
| 1992 | DragonStrike (NES) |
| 1992 | The Dark Queen of Krynn (Gold Box) |

Eight video games are set in the Dragonlance world. They belong in six different genres and were released within five years, from 1988 to 1992.

DL01 - Dragons of Despair and DL02 - Dragons of Flame (corresponding to the events in the first novel, Dragons of Autumn Twilight) were adapted into the video games Heroes of the Lance and Dragons of Flame, respectively. Instead of being role-playing video games, they are platform games using the Silver Box game engine. DL03 - Dragons of Hope and DL04 - Dragons of Desolation (corresponding to the events between the first and the second novel) were adapted into the video game Shadow Sorcerer. Released in 1991, this early real-time strategy game is a direct sequel to the first two games and a prequel to War of the Lance (1989). DL11 - Dragons of Glory is a self-contained tabletop strategy game (corresponding to the events in the background of the third novel, Dragons of Spring Dawning) that was adapted into the turn-based strategy game War of the Lance.

DragonStrike is a 1990 combat flight simulation game whose plot begins halfway through the previous video game. The 1992 NES remake is a scrolling shooter that features an ending different from the one in the novels, but following and fixing a "bad ending" from DL14 - Dragons of Triumph. Neither game is based directly on any tabletop module. The Gold Box trilogy (Champions of Krynn, Death Knights of Krynn, and The Dark Queen of Krynn) are the only role-playing video games based on Dragonlance. They tell an original story that begins shortly after the events in the 14 tabletop modules.

Apart from those, the MUSH game DragonLance is based on Krynn during the final stage of the War of the Lance.

=== Other ===
The series has inspired mention in music as well, including "Wishmaster", a song by Nightwish based partially on the master and apprentice relationship between Raistlin Majere and Dalamar. The Swedish metal band Lake of Tears also recorded a song called "Raistlin and the Rose" on their 1997 album Crimson Cosmos, while the German group Blind Guardian wrote "The Soulforged", another song inspired by Raistlin's story, which appeared on the band's 2002 album A Night at the Opera. Also Danish/American band Pyramaze recorded in their 2008 album Immortal song "Caramon's Poem". A Russian concept album (2009-2010) and musical (premiered 2014) based on Raistlin's story, The Last Trial, was created by Anton Kruglov and Yelena Khanpira.

In 2008, Dragonlance: Dragons of Autumn Twilight, an animated film based on the first Dragonlance book of the same name, was released direct-to-video. The animation was produced by Toonz Animation, and featured the voices of Lucy Lawless, Kiefer Sutherland, Michael Rosenbaum, and Michelle Trachtenberg. In late 2011, Holysoft Studios Ltd. released the first part of a German audio adaption of the Chronicles Trilogy, with subsequent releases of the later trilogies being announced.

In comics, Krynn has been represented on the 1988 Dragonlance series by DC Comics and TSR. More recently, Devil's Due Publishing and Wizards of the Coast have also produced a number of comic book series: The Legend of Huma (2003), Chronicles (2005) and Legends (2008).

== World ==
The Dragonlance world is described in dozens of books and novels. The setting contains numerous characters, an extensive timeline, and a detailed geography.

=== Setting ===
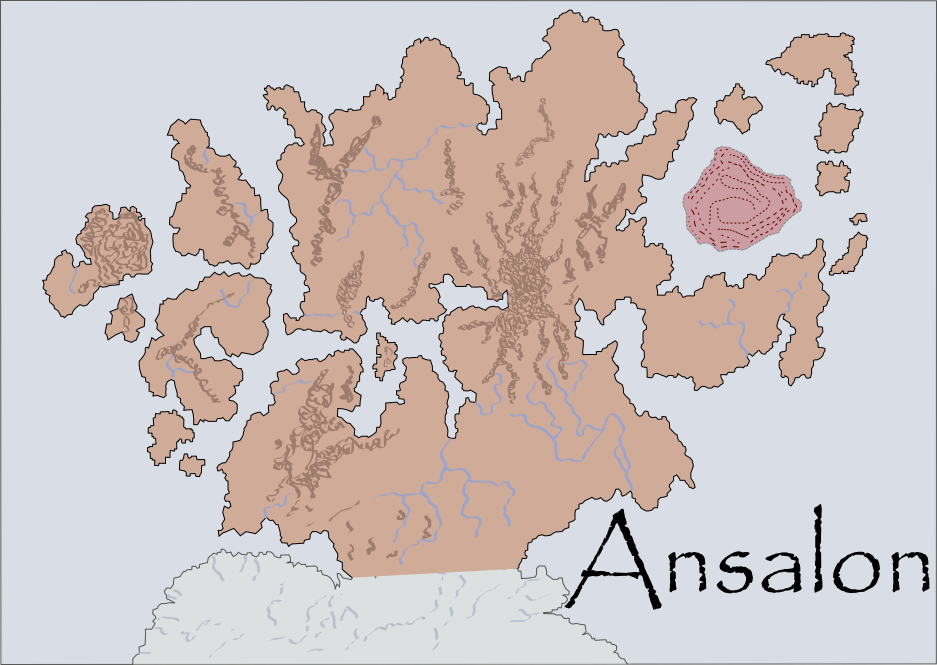
Map of Ansalon, where the majority of the novels take place

Dragonlance is set on the world of Krynn. Most of the novels take place in the regions of Ansalon, a small continent, though some have taken place on the continent of Taladas, located northeast of Ansalon. The world's major gods are the High God and his children: good Paladine, neutral Gilean, and evil Takhisis. The gods are opposed by Chaos, who seeks to destroy Krynn. Depending on the period, the evil chromatic and the good metallic dragons are rare or plentiful. Humans are Krynn's most common humanoid race, but elves, dwarves, kender, gnomes, and minotaurs occupy the world as well. Clerics derive magical powers from their gods, and wizards derive power from the three moon gods, good Solinari, neutral Lunitari, and evil Nuitari. Hickman had previously served as a Mormon missionary in Java for two years and used Indonesian in Dragonlance spells. During Krynn's various wars, armies of draconians are used as troops. Draconians are created by corrupting a dragon egg, creating a reptilian humanoid. Any dragon egg can be used to make a draconian, although the ones most commonly used are good dragon eggs because the evil kings want more evil dragons to hatch.

Other gods of the setting include the gods of good Branchala, Habbakuk, Kiri-Jolith, Majere, and Mishakal; the gods of neutrality Chislev, Reorx, Shinare, Sirrion, and Zivilyn; and the gods of evil, Chemosh, Hiddukel, Morgion, Sargonnas, and Zeboim.

=== Fictional history ===
The history of the world of Krynn, and thus the settings for both the novels and gaming supplements, is roughly split into five separate ages. The first age is the time of creation, when the gods are born and Krynn is formed. The Age of Dreams, the second age, is marked by the rapid growth of the world's first great civilizations and the appearance of myriad new races. This era is also marked by three great wars between dragons and their minions. Following the Third Dragon War, in the Age of Might, the Cataclysm obliterates the great empire of Istar and changes almost the entire surface of Krynn. A 300-year depression follows this event, in what is called the Age of Despair. This period also marks the War of the Lance. When Dragonlance was first introduced to Dungeons & Dragons, events such as the Lost Wars happened during The Age of Despair. Later Age of Mortals novels and game supplements took Krynn into the Fifth Age (the Age of Mortals).

=== Dragonlances ===
Dragonlances are rare and not commonly traded. There are lesser dragonlances, which are made when only one of the artifacts is used to create them, and greater dragonlances, which are made when both artifacts are used to make them. Greater dragonlances are blessed with the power of Good, unlike lesser dragonlances.

There are two sizes of dragonlance. The smaller footman's dragonlance is around eight feet long and functions as a polearm, while the larger mounted dragonlance is around sixteen feet long and most commonly used when mounted on a dragon.

=== Characters ===
The Heroes of the Lance: from left Raistlin, Caramon, Tanis, Tasslehoff, Flint, Goldmoon, Riverwind, Sturm, Tika, and Laurana. Tracy Hickman keeps this Larry Elmore painting on the wall in his office.

The Heroes of the Lance are the protagonists of the Chronicles trilogy, the first series of Dragonlance books. They were created by Weis and Hickman, then fleshed out as player characters in gaming sessions of Dungeons & Dragons at Hickman's apartment. One player at this initial gaming session was game designer Terry Phillips, who was playing as Raistlin. According to Hickman in the foreword to The Soulforge, "[we] were just settling in to the game when I turned to my good friend Terry Phillips and asked what his character was doing. Terry spoke...and the world of Krynn was forever changed. His rasping voice, his sarcasm and bitterness all masking an arrogance and power that never needed to be stated suddenly were real. Everyone in the room was both transfixed and terrified. To this day Margaret [Weis] swears that Terry wore the black robes to the party that night."

In a "Traveling Road Show" put on to publicize the novels, the Heroes of the Lance were played by various people. Authors Gary and Janet Pack played the half-elf Tanis Half-Elven and the kender Tasslehoff Burrfoot, respectively. Author Douglas Niles played the dwarf Flint Fireforge. TSR employee Harold Johnson played the Solamnic knight Sturm Brightblade. The rest of the Heroes are the barbarians Goldmoon and Riverwind, elf Laurana Kanan, and humans Caramon Majere (Raistlin's brother) and Tika Waylan. Weis played Fizban the Fabulous.

In the beginning, Margaret Weis had problems depicting Tanis Half-Elven in the novels. Tracy Hickman finally told her that "he's James T. Kirk of the Starship Enterprise". After that explanation, Margaret had no more difficulty writing about Tanis. Other noteworthy antagonists, and sometimes protagonists, are the Death Knight Lord Soth and Kitiara Uth Matar, the half-sister of Raistlin and Caramon, and leader of one of the Dragonarmies of Ansalon. According to Hickman, Lord Soth is the most unpredictable character to write about: "Every time that character made an appearance in one of our books he would try to run off with the story".

=== Locations ===
The world of Dragonlance is set on the planet of Krynn, with most of the action taking place on the continent of Ansalon. Some of the key countries and areas on Ansalon are the Plains of Dust, Solamnia with its great metropolis, Palanthas, the Blood Sea Isles, the Empire of Ergoth, Istar, and Sancrist, the elven kingdom of Silvanesti, as well as the dwarven realm of Thorbardin. Important cities and towns and other locations include Solace (location of the Inn of the Last Home, and Sad Town), the High Clerist's Tower, Palanthas, Kendermore, Port Balifor (location of the Pig and Whistle Tavern), and the various Towers of High Sorcery.

=== Races ===
Like in many Dungeons & Dragons campaign settings, the fictional world of the Dragonlance campaign is shaped by the division by race, with white humans as the central focus, but also including elves, goblins, and many others. With the species in many cases clearly assigned to "good" and "evil", some critics have suggested that the setting had the potential to raise racist expectations. The authors take an active stance against racist ideology and ensure that a "fascistic genocidal campaign to wipe-out species that are considered 'impure'" would have catastrophic consequences. In contrast, the authors emphasize the need for tolerance and cooperation between the races.

== Reception ==
Dragonlance is one of the most popular shared worlds, worlds in which writers other than those that created them place adventures. The first Dragonlance trilogy, Chronicles, launched the Dungeons & Dragons line of novels, with many of its characters spun off into other novels. Along with Forgotten Realms, Dragonlance is TSR's most popular series of novels. According to The 1990s by Marc Oxoby, what is most notable about the series is that "what may at one time been considered disposable, escapist literature" found "unprecedented popularity" in the 1990s. All of the Dragonlance novels remained in print during the decade, turning Weis and Hickman into literary stars and boosting sales of their non-Dragonlance novels. Although the series was initially published in paperback, its success led to hardcover printings. The hardcover version of Dragons of Summer Flame had an "impressive" first printing of 200,000 books. Every Dragonlance novel by Weis and Hickman since 1995 has been released in hardcover, and some previous novels have been re-released in hardcover collector's editions. Dragonlance made TSR one of the most successful publishers of science fiction and fantasy in the 1990s.

By 2008, there were more than 190 novels in the Dragonlance franchise. Weis and Hickman's Dragonlance novels have made over twenty bestseller lists, with sales in excess of 22 million. The pair's novels have been translated into German, Japanese, Danish, Dutch, Finnish, Spanish, French, Italian, Hebrew, Portuguese, Greek and Turkish and have sold well in the United States, Britain, and Australia.

Not all critics have praised Dragonlance and its creators. According to author Stephen Hunt, Wendy Bradley of Interzone magazine does not think highly of their work. Hunt feels that it is unusual for authors to receive such loathing among "fantasy's literary mafia", saying that "behind every critic's scorn laden insult, there lays [sic] that unsaid thought at the end: 'But I could have written that!'" Visions of Wonder, edited by David G. Hartwell and Milton T. Wolf, and published by the Science Fiction Research Association, argues that Dragonlance is published under the "omnivore theory" of publishing. In this theory, the readership is made up of teenagers, and completely replaces itself every three to five years. This allows publishers to release subpar novels and still reach a small yet profitable audience.

== General and cited sources ==
- Hickman, Tracy; Weis, Margaret; Chambers, Jamie (2004). War Of The Lance. Lake Geneva, Wisconsin: Sovereign Press. ISBN 193156714X.
- Wolf, Nadine (2010). Religious Concepts in Fantasy Literature. GRIN Verlag. ISBN 978-3640661428.
