= Find Your Fate =

Gamebooks featuring licensed characters

Cover of the first volume, first edition (1984); painting by David B. Mattingly

Find Your Fate is a series of gamebooks published by Ballantine Books featuring licensed characters including Indiana Jones, James Bond, and Morgan Swift. They were written and published between 1984 and 1987 by authors including R. L. Stine, Rose Estes, and Richard Wenk to compete with the popular Choose Your Own Adventure series published by Bantam Books, featuring a similar branching storyline which depended on choices made by the reader.

== Licenses ==
Several media franchises were licensed by Ballantine for the Find Your Fate and Find Your Fate Junior books, including:

- Doctor Who (6 books), published in the UK as Make Your Own Adventure with Doctor Who
- G.I. Joe (20 books)
- Golden Girl (3 books; Junior)
- Indiana Jones (11 books)
- James Bond (4 books)
- Jem (6 books)
- Morgan Swift (2 books)
- Tales from the Crypt (1 book)
- The Three Investigators (4 books)
- ThunderCats (2 books)
- Transformers (9 books; Junior)

== Books ==
Find Your Fate books
No.	Title	Year	Author	Illustrator	ISBN	Notes
1	Indiana Jones and the Curse of Horror Island	1984	R. L. Stine	David B. Mattingly	0-345-31665-7	
2	Indiana Jones and the Lost Treasure of Sheba	1984	Rose Estes	David B. Mattingly	0-345-31664-9	
3	Indiana Jones and the Giants of the Silver Tower	1984	R. L. Stine	David B. Mattingly	0-345-31715-7	
4	Indiana Jones and the Eye of the Fates	1984	Richard Wenk	David B. Mattingly	0-345-31716-5	
5	Indiana Jones and the Cup of the Vampire	1984	Andrew Helfer	David B. Mattingly	0-345-31905-2	
6	Indiana Jones and the Legion of Death	1984	Richard Wenk	David B. Mattingly	0-345-31904-4	
7	Indiana Jones and the Cult of the Mummy's Crypt	1985	R. L. Stine	David B. Mattingly	0-345-32305-X	
8	Indiana Jones and the Dragon of Vengeance	1985	Megan Stine H. William Stine	David B. Mattingly	0-345-32320-3	
9	Indiana Jones and the Gold of Genghis Khan	1985	Ellen Weiss	David B. Mattingly	0-345-32409-9	
10	Morgan Swift and the Kidnapped Goddess	1985	Sara Hughes	Ann Meisel	0-345-32367-X	
11	James Bond in Win, Place, or Die	1985	R. L. Stine	Cliff Spohn	0-345-32404-8	Tie-in with A View to a Kill.
12	James Bond in Strike It Deadly	1985	Barbara Siegel Scott Siegel	Cliff Spohn	0-345-32405-6	
13	James Bond in Programmed for Danger	1985	Jean M. Favors	Cliff Spohn	0-345-32456-0	
14	James Bond in Barracuda Run	1985	Steven Otfinoski	Cliff Spohn	0-345-32468-4	
15	Morgan Swift and the Treasure of Crocodile Key	1985	Sara Hughes	Ann Meisel	0-345-32672-5	
16	Indiana Jones and the Ape Slaves of Howling Island	1987	R. L. Stine	Barclay Shaw	0-345-33882-0	
17	Indiana Jones and the Mask of the Elephant	1987	Megan Stine H. William Stine	Barclay Shaw	0-345-32320-3	

Find Your Fate G.I. Joe books
No.	Title	Year	Author	Illustrator	ISBN	Notes
1	Operation: Star Raider	1985	Eric Affabee	David Henderson	0-345-32665-2	
2	Operation: Dragon Fire	1985	William Sno	David Henderson	0-345-32666-0	
3	Operation: Terror Trap	1985	H. William Stine Megan Stine	David Henderson	0-345-32667-9	Sometimes numbered as #4
4	Operation: Robot Assassin	1985	G.V. Macrae	David Henderson	0-345-32668-7	
5	The Everglades Swamp Terror	1986	Eric Affabee	David Henderson	0-345-32986-4	
6	Operation: Death Stone	1986	Barbara Siegel Scott Siegel	David Henderson	0-345-32936-8	
7	Operation: Deadly Decoy	1986	R. L. Stine	David Henderson	0-345-32937-6	
8	Operation: Death-Ray	1986	Megan Stine H. William Stine	David Henderson	0-345-32938-4	
9	Operation: Mindbender	1986	R. L. Stine	David Henderson	0-345-33786-7	
10	Operation: Night Flight	1986	William Sno	David Henderson	0-345-33787-5	
11	Operation: Weapons Disaster	1986	James M. Ward	David Henderson	0-345-33788-3	
12	Operation: Jungle Doom	1986	Lynn Beach	David Henderson	0-345-33789-1	
13	Operation: Snow Job	1987	Barbara Siegel Scott Siegel	David Henderson	0-345-33790-5	
14	Operation: Thunderbolt	1987	K.C. Edwards	David Henderson	0-345-33791-3	
15	Operation: Time Machine	1987	Lynn Beach	David Henderson	0-345-34063-9	
16	Operation: Poison Dart	1987	Megan Stine H. William Stine	David Henderson	0-345-34064-7	
17	Operation: Sink or Swim	1987	Barbara Siegel Scott Siegel	David Henderson	0-345-34065-5	
18	Operation: Killer Comet	1987	S.M. Ballard	David Henderson	0-345-34066-3	
19	Operation: Tiger Strike	1987	William Sno	David Henderson	0-345-34067-1	
20	Serpentor and the Mummy Warrior	1987	R. L. Stine	David Henderson	0-345-34069-8	

Find Your Fate Junior Transformers books
No.	Title	Year	Author	Illustrator	ISBN	Notes
1	Dinobots Strike Back	1985	Casey Todd	William Schmidt	0-345-32669-5	
2	Battle Drive	1985	Barbara Siegel Scott Siegel	William Schmidt	0-345-32670-9	
3	Attack of the Insecticons	1985	Lynn Beach	William Schmidt	0-345-32671-7	
4	Earthquake	1986	Ann Matthews	William Schmidt	0-345-33071-4	
5	Desert Flight	1986	Jim Razzi	William Schmidt	0-345-33072-2	
6	Decepticon Poison	1986	Judith Bauer Stamper	William Schmidt	0-345-33073-0	
7	Autobot Alert!	1986	Judith Bauer Stamper	William Schmidt	0-345-33388-8	
8	Project Brain Drain	1986	Barbara Siegel Scott Siegel	William Schmidt	0-345-33389-6	
9	The Invisibility Factor	1986	Josepha Sherman	William Schmidt	0-345-33391-8	

Find Your Fate Random House books
No.	Title	Franchise	Genre	Year	Author	Illustrator	ISBN	Notes
RH1	The Case of the Weeping Coffin	The Three Investigators	Mystery	1985	Megan Stine H. Wiliam Stine	John Hulsey	0-394-86725-4	
RH2	The Case of the Dancing Dinosaur	The Three Investigators	Mystery	1985	Rose Estes	Vincente	0-394-86431-X	
RH3	The Ghost Warrior	ThunderCats	Fantasy	1985	Megan Stine H. Wiliam Stine	Esteban Maroto	0-394-87419-6	
RH4	The Snowmen of Hook Mountain	ThunderCats	Fantasy	1985	Megan Stine H. Wiliam Stine	Martin Sauri	0-394-87420-X	
RH5	The Trail of Death	—	Thriller	1985	Rose Estes	Robert Adragna	0-394-86432-8	
RH6	The Turkish Tattoo	—	Thriller	1986	Rose Estes	Toby Gowing	0-394-86434-4	
RH7	The Case of the House of Horrors	The Three Investigators	Mystery	1986	Megan Stine H. Wiliam Stine	Aristides Ruiz	0-394-88226-1	
RH8	The Case of the Savage Statue	The Three Investigators	Mystery	1986	M. V. Carey	Tom Leonard	0-394-88225-3	

Find Your Fate Junior Golden Girl books
No.	Title	Year	Author	Illustrator	ISBN	Notes
1	Golden Girl and the Vanishing Unicorn	1986	R. L. Stine	Ken Barr	0-345-32860-4	
2	Golden Girl in the Land of Dreams	1986	Alice Storey	Ken Barr	0-345-32861-2	
3	Golden Girl and the Crystal of Doom	1986	Josepha Sherman	Ken Barr	0-345-32862-0	

Find Your Fate Doctor Who books
No.	Title	Year	Author	Illustrator	ISBN	Notes
1	Search for the Doctor	1986	David Martin	Gail Bennett	0-345-33224-5	
2	Crisis in Space	1986	Michael Holt	Gail Bennett	0-345-33225-3	
3	Garden of Evil	1986	David Martin	Gail Bennett	0-345-33226-1	
4	Mission to Venus	1986	William Emms	Gail Bennett	0-345-33229-6	
5	Invasion of the Ormazoids	1986	Philip Martin	Gail Bennett	0-345-33231-8	
6	Race Against Time	1986	Pip and Jane Baker	Gail Bennett	0-345-33228-8	

Find Your Fate Jem books
No.	Title	Year	Author	Illustrator	ISBN	Notes
1	Jewels in the Dark	1986	Rusty Hallock	—	0-345-33792-1	
2	The Video Caper	1986	Jean Waricha	—	0-345-33794-8	
3	The Secret of Rainbow Island	1986	Judith Bauer Stamper	—	0-345-33795-6	
4	Double Trouble	—	Rusty Hallock	—	unpublished	
5	Haunted Video	—	Judith Bauer Stamper	—	unpublished	
6	Dynamite Date	—	Jean Waricha	—	unpublished	

Find Your (Unfortunate) Fate Tales from the Crypt book
No.	Title	Year	Author	Illustrator	ISBN	Notes
1	Name Your Nightmare	1995	James Lowder	—	0-679-87444-5	
