= Firstborn (disambiguation) =

The firstborn is the eldest child born in a family.

Firstborn may also refer to:

== Literature ==
- First Born (comics), a supervillain in DC Comics
- Firstborn (Clarke and Baxter novel), 2007 novel by Arthur C. Clarke and Stephen Baxter
- Firstborn (Thompson and Carter novel), 1991 novel by Paul B. Thompson and Tonya C. Cook
- The First Born, a play by Francis Powers staged on Broadway in 1897

== Film and television ==
- Firstborn (1984 film), starring Teri Garr and Peter Weller
- First Born (2007 film), starring Elisabeth Shur
- 1st Born, a 2019 American-Iranian comedy film
- First Born (TV serial), British TV show, 1988
- "Firstborn" (Star Trek: The Next Generation), TV episode of Star Trek: The Next Generation
- The First Born (1921 film), starring Sessue Hayakawa
- The First Born (1928 film), starring Miles Mander

== Music ==
- First Born (Eyedea & Abilities album), 2001
- First Born (The Plot in You album), 2011

== Religion ==
- Firstborn (Judaism), bechor in rabbinical Judaism
- FIrstborn Laestadianism, a subgroup of the Pietistic Lutheran revival movement

== See also ==
- Primogeniture, the firstborn child inherits parents' property
