= Ben Hecht =

American writer, director, and producer (1894–1964)

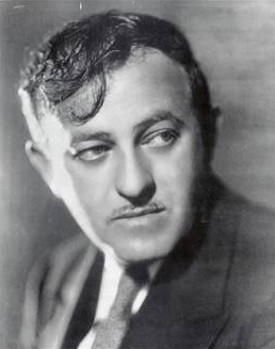
- Hecht in 1945
- Born: February 28, 1894; New York City, U.S.
- Died: April 18, 1964 (aged 70); New York City, U.S.
- Occupations: Screenwriter; director; producer; novelist; playwright; journalist
- Years active: 1916–1964
- Style: Comedy, newspapers, gangster
- Spouse(s): Marie Armstrong (m. 1915; div. 1925) Rose Caylor (m. 1925)
- Children: 2

Ben Hecht (/hɛkt/; February 28, 1894 – April 18, 1964) was an American screenwriter, director, producer, playwright, journalist, and novelist. A journalist in his youth, he went on to write 35 books and some of the most enjoyed screenplays and plays in America. He received screen credits, alone or in collaboration, for the stories or screenplays of some seventy films, including six Academy Award nominations and two wins.

After graduating from high school in 1910, Hecht ran away to Chicago, where, in his own words, he "haunted streets, whorehouses, police stations, courtrooms, theater stages, jails, saloons, slums, madhouses, fires, murders, riots, banquet halls, and bookshops." In the 1910s and 1920s, Hecht became a noted journalist, foreign correspondent, and literary figure. In the late 1920s, his co-authored, reporter-themed play, The Front Page, became a Broadway hit.

The Dictionary of Literary Biography – American Screenwriters calls him "one of the most successful screenwriters in the history of motion pictures". Hecht received the first Academy Award for Best Story for Underworld (1927). Many of the screenplays he worked on are now considered classics. He also provided story ideas for such films as Stagecoach (1939). Film historian Richard Corliss called him "the Hollywood screenwriter", someone who "personified Hollywood itself". In 1940, he wrote, produced, and directed Angels Over Broadway, which was nominated for Best Screenplay.

Hecht became an active Zionist after meeting Peter Bergson, who came to the United States near the start of World War II. Motivated by what became the Holocaust Hecht wrote articles and plays, such as We Will Never Die in 1943 and A Flag is Born in 1946. Thereafter, he wrote many screenplays anonymously to avoid a British boycott of his work in the late 1940s and early 1950s. The boycott was a response to Hecht's active support of paramilitary action against British Mandate for Palestine forces, during which time a Zionist force's supply ship to Palestine was named the S.S. Ben Hecht.

In 1954, Hecht published his highly regarded autobiography, A Child of the Century. According to it, he did not hold screenwriting (in contrast to journalism) in high esteem, and never spent more than eight weeks on a script. In 1983, 19 years after his death, Ben Hecht was posthumously inducted into the American Theater Hall of Fame.

== Early years ==
Hecht was born in New York City on February 28, 1894, the son of Belarusian-Jewish immigrants Joseph Hecht, a worker in the garment industry, and his wife Sarah (née Swernofsky). The couple was from Minsk, Russian Empire, and had married in 1892.

The family moved to Racine, Wisconsin, where Ben attended high school. For his bar mitzvah, his parents bought him four crates full of the works of Shakespeare, Dickens and Twain. When Hecht was in his early teens, he would spend the summers with an uncle in Chicago. On the road much of the time, his father did not have much effect on Hecht's childhood, and his mother was busy managing a store in downtown Racine. Film author Scott Siegal wrote, "He was considered a child prodigy at age ten, seemingly on his way to a career as a concert violinist, but two years later was performing as a circus acrobat".

After graduating from Racine High School in 1910, Hecht attended the University of Wisconsin for three days before leaving for Chicago at the age of 16 or 17. He lived with relatives and started a career in journalism. He won a job with the Chicago Daily Journal after writing a profane poem for publisher John C. Eastman to entertain guests at a party. By age seventeen Hecht was a full-time reporter, first with the Daily Journal, and later with the Chicago Daily News. In the aftermath of World War I, Hecht was sent to cover Berlin for the Daily News. While there, he also wrote his first and most successful novel, Erik Dorn (1921). It was a sensational debut for Hecht as a serious writer.

The 1969 movie, Gaily, Gaily, directed by Norman Jewison and starring Beau Bridges as "Ben Harvey", was based on Hecht's life during his early years working as a reporter in Chicago. The film was nominated for three Oscars. The story was taken from a portion of his autobiography, A Child of the Century. It was also from his 1963 book Gaily, Gaily.

== Writing career ==
=== Journalist ===
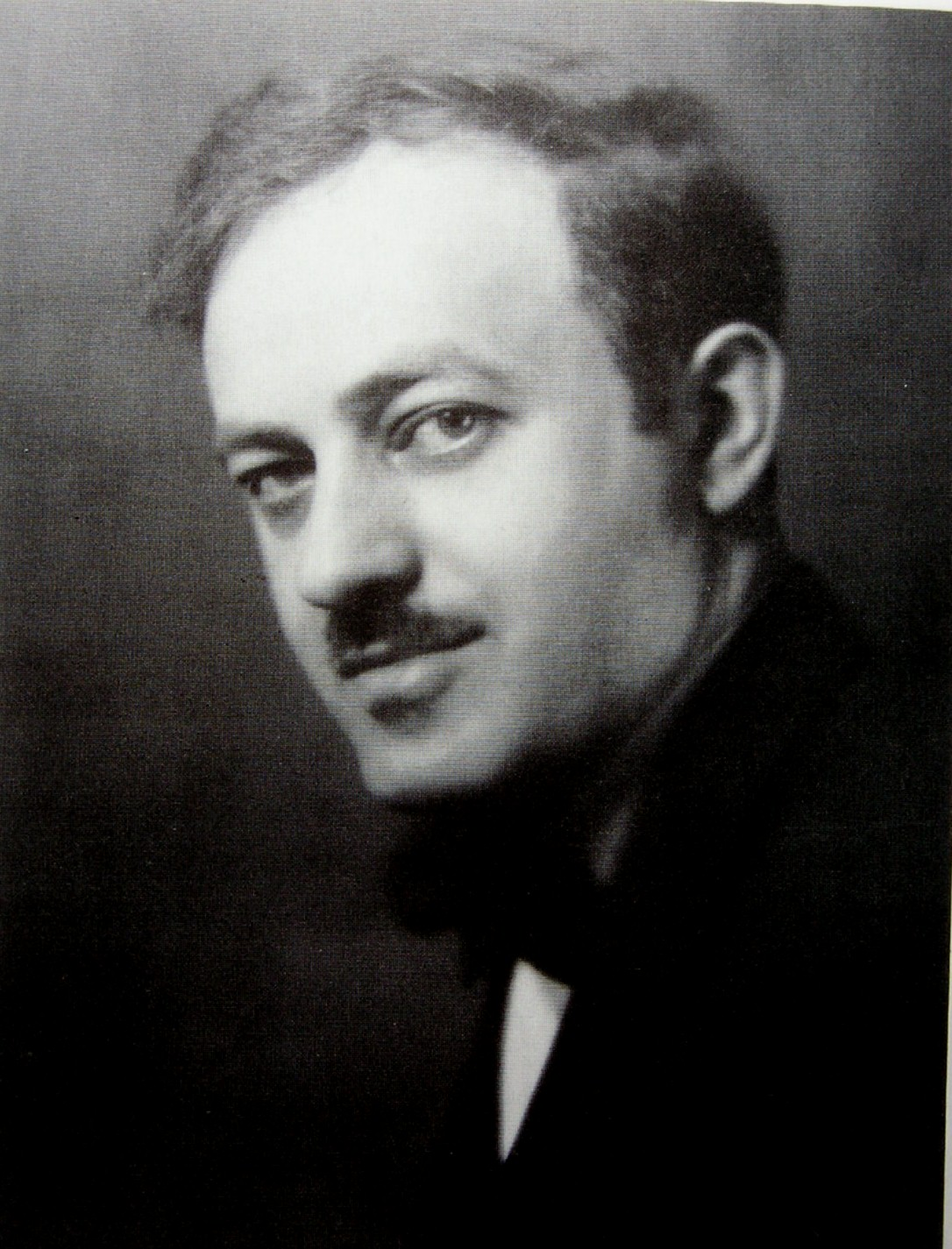
Hecht in 1919

From 1918 to 1919, Hecht served as war correspondent in Berlin for the Chicago Daily News. According to Barbara and Scott Siegel, "Besides being a war reporter, he was noted for being a tough crime reporter while also becoming known in Chicago literary circles".

In 1921, Hecht inaugurated a Daily News column, One Thousand and One Afternoons in Chicago. While it lasted, the column was enormously influential. His editor, Henry Justin Smith, later said it represented a new concept in journalism:

the idea that just under the edge of the news as commonly understood, the news often flatly unimaginatively told, lay life; that in this urban life there dwelt the stuff of literature, not hidden in remote places, either, but walking the downtown streets, peering from the windows of sky scrapers, sunning itself in parks and boulevards. He was going to be its interpreter. His was to be the lens throwing city life into new colors, his the microscope revealing its contortions in life and death.

While at the Chicago Daily News, Hecht famously broke the 1921 "Ragged Stranger Murder Case" story, about the murder of war hero Carl Wanderer's wife, which led to Wanderer's trial and execution. In Chicago, he also met and befriended Maxwell Bodenheim, an American poet and novelist, later known as the King of Greenwich Village Bohemians, and with whom he became a lifelong friend.

After concluding One Thousand and One Afternoons, Hecht went on to produce novels, plays, screenplays, and memoirs, but for him, none of these eclipsed his early success in finding the stuff of literature in city life. Recalling that period, Hecht wrote, "I haunted streets, whorehouses, police stations, courtrooms, theater stages, jails, saloons, slums, madhouses, fires, murders, riots, banquet halls, and bookshops. I ran everywhere in the city like a fly buzzing in the works of a clock, tasted more than any fit belly could hold, learned not to sleep, and buried myself in a tick-tock of whirling hours that still echo in me".

=== Novelist and short-story writer ===
Besides working as reporter in Chicago, Hecht also contributed short stories to literary magazines, including his friend, Margaret C. Anderson's, Little Review. His reporting on revolutionary movements from Berlin after World War I, his first novel, Erik Dorn (1921) drawn from that experience, and his daily column 1001 Afternoons in Chicago, later collected into a book, enhanced his reputation in the literary scene. After leaving the News in 1923, he started his own newspaper, The Chicago Literary Times.

According to biographer Eddy Applegate, "Hecht read voraciously the works of Gautier, Baudelaire, Mallarmé, and Verlaine, and developed a style that was extraordinary and imaginative. The use of metaphor, imagery, and vivid phrases made his writing distinct ... again and again Hecht showed an uncanny ability to picture the strange jumble of events in strokes as vivid and touching as the brushmarks of a novelist".

"Ben Hecht was the enfant terrible of American letters in the first half of the twentieth century", wrote author Sanford Sternlicht in 2004. "If Hecht was consistently opposed to anything, it was to censorship of literature, art, and film by either the government or self-appointed guardians of public morality". He adds, "Even though he never attended college, Hecht became a successful novelist, playwright, journalist, and screenwriter. His star has sunk below the horizon now, but in his own lifetime Hecht became one of the most famous American literary and entertainment figures".

Eventually Hecht became associated with the writers Sherwood Anderson, Theodore Dreiser, Maxwell Bodenheim, Carl Sandburg, and Pascal Covici. He knew Margaret Anderson, and contributed to her Little Review, the magazine of the Chicago "literary renaissance", and to Smart Set.

A Child of the Century

In 1954, Hecht published his autobiography, A Child of the Century, which, according to literary critic Robert Schmuhl, "received such extensive critical acclaim that his literary reputation improved markedly during the last decade of his life ... Hecht's vibrant and candid memoir of more than six hundred pages restored him to the stature of a serious and significant American writer". Novelist Saul Bellow reviewed the book for The New York Times: "His manners are not always nice, but then nice manners do not always make interesting autobiographies, and this autobiography has the merit of being intensely interesting ... If he is occasionally slick, he is also independent, forthright, and original. Among the pussycats who write of social issues today, he roars like an old-fashioned lion." In 2011, Richard Corliss, announced the Time editorial board named Hecht's autobiography to the Time 100 best non-fiction books list (books published since the founding of the magazine in 1923).

New Yorker film critic David Denby begins a discussion of Hecht's screenwriting by recounting a long story from his autobiography. He then asks, "How many of these details are true? It's impossible to say, but truth, in this case, may not be the point. As Norman Mailer noted in 1973, Hecht 'was never a writer to tell the truth when a concoction could put life in his prose.'" Denby calls this Hecht's "gift for confabulated anecdote". Near the end of the article, Denby returns to A Child of the Century, "that vast compendium of period evocation, juiced anecdotes, and dubious philosophy".

Ghostwriting Marilyn Monroe's biography

Besides working on novels and short stories, he has been credited with ghostwriting books, including Marilyn Monroe's autobiography My Story. "The reprint of Marilyn Monroe's memoir, My Story, in 2000, by Cooper Square Press, correctly credits Hecht as an author, ending a period of almost fifty years in which Hecht's role was denied ... Hecht himself, however, kept denying it publicly".

According to her biographer, Sarah Churchwell, Monroe was "persuaded to capitalize on her newfound celebrity by beginning an autobiography. It was born out of a collaboration with journalist and screenwriter Ben Hecht, hired as a ghostwriter". Churchwell adds that the facts in her story were highly selective. "Hecht reported to his editor during the interviews that he was sometimes sure Marilyn was fabricating. He explained, 'When I say lying, I mean she isn't telling the truth. I don't think so much that she is trying to deceive me as that she is a fantasizer.'"

=== Playwright ===
Beginning with a series of one-acts in 1914, he began writing plays. His first full-length play was The Egotist, and it was produced in New York in 1922. While living in Chicago, he met fellow reporter Charles MacArthur and together they moved to New York to collaborate on their Chicago-crime-reporter themed play, The Front Page. It was widely acclaimed and had a successful run on Broadway of 281 performances, beginning August 1928. In 1931, it was turned into a successful film, which was nominated for three Oscars.

=== Screenwriter ===
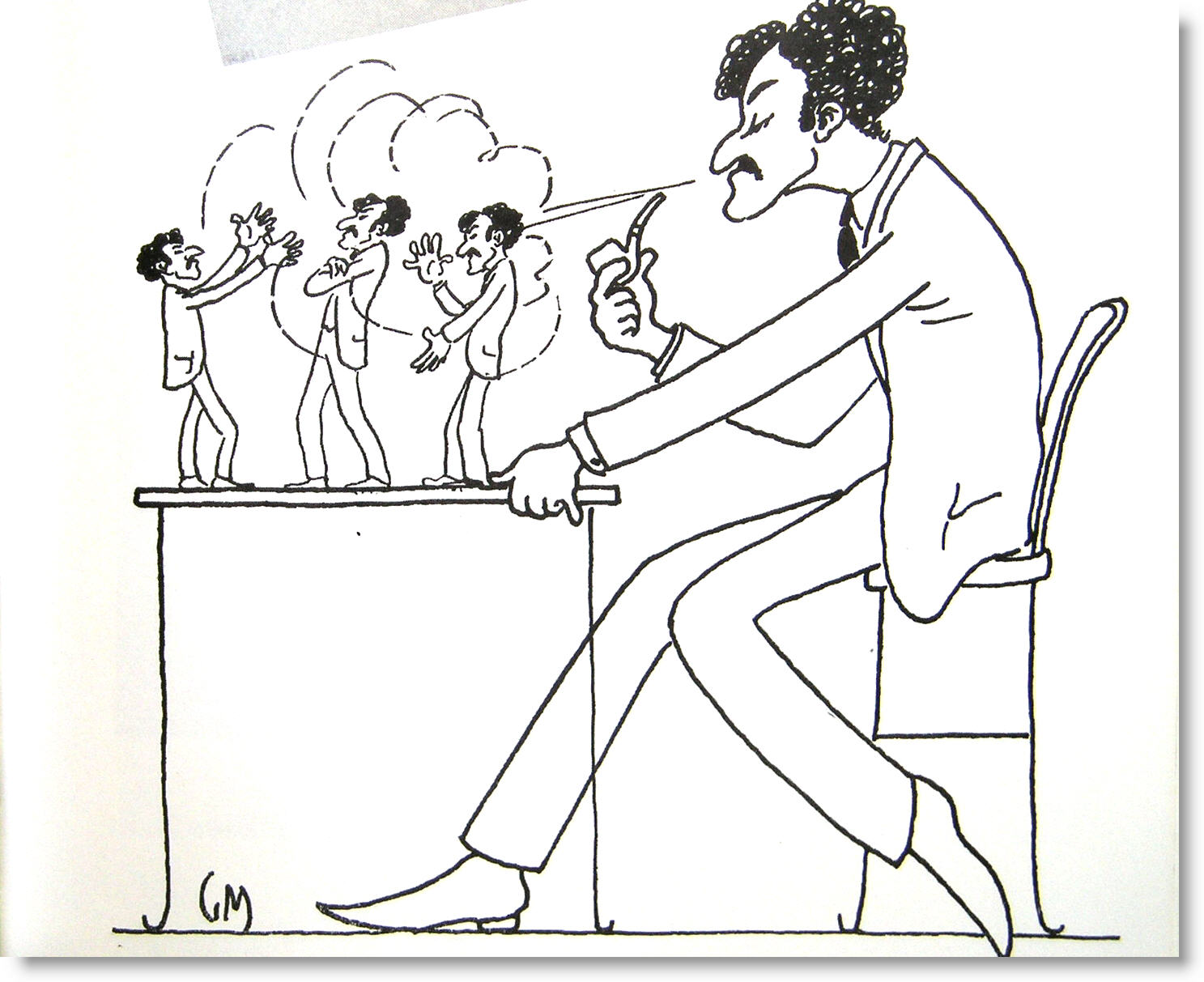
Caricature of Ben Hecht in 1923, drawn by fellow Chicago reporter (and later screenwriter) Gene Markey

Film historian Richard Corliss writes, "Ben Hecht was the Hollywood screenwriter ... [and] it can be said without too much exaggeration that Hecht personifies Hollywood itself." Movie columnist Pauline Kael says, "between them, Hecht and Jules Furthman wrote most of the best American talkies". Eddie Muller stated that "Ben Hecht's fingerprints are all over some of Hollywood's greatest movies, including early prototypes of what would become film noir." His movie career can be defined by about twenty credited screenplays he wrote for Hawks, Hitchcock, Hathaway, Lubitsch, Wellman, Sternberg, and himself. He wrote many of those with his two regular collaborators, Charles MacArthur and Charles Lederer.

While living in New York in 1926, he received a telegram from screenwriter friend Herman J. Mankiewicz, who had recently moved to Los Angeles. "Will you accept three hundred per week to work for Paramount Pictures. All expenses paid. The three hundred is peanuts. Millions are to be grabbed out here, and your only competition is idiots", it read. "Don't let this get around." As a writer in need of money, he traveled to Hollywood as Mankiewicz suggested. In the film The Front Page, when the sheriff asks who threw a bucket out the window, Walter Catlett's character replies, "Judge Mankiewicz threw it," a nod to Hecht's friend.

Working in Hollywood

He arrived in Los Angeles and began his career at the beginning of the sound era by writing the story for Josef von Sternberg's gangster movie Underworld in 1927. For that first screenplay and story, he won an Academy Award for Best Original Screenplay in Hollywood's first Academy award ceremony. Soon afterward, he became the "most prolific and highest paid screenwriter in Hollywood".

Hecht spent from two to twelve weeks in Hollywood each year, "during which he earned enough money (his record was $100,000 in one month, for two screenplays) to live on for the rest of the year in New York, where he did what he considered his serious writing", writes film historian Carol Easton. Nonetheless, later in his career, "he was a writer who liked to think that his genius had been stifled by Hollywood and by its dreadful habit of giving him so much money". He wrote that "there is something about the way they (films) are made and the way they disappear that gives you ... the feeling that you are mysteriously wasting your time—and not using your real talents."

Yet his income was as much a result of his skill as a writer as well as his early jobs with newspapers. As film historians Mast and Kawin wrote, "The newspaper reporters often seemed like gangsters who had accidentally ended up behind a typewriter rather than a tommy gun; they talked and acted as rough as the crooks their assignments forced them to cover ... It is no accident that Ben Hecht, the greatest screenwriter of rapid-fire, flavorful tough talk, as well as a major comic playwright, wrote gangster pictures, prison pictures, and newspaper pictures."

Hecht became one of Hollywood's most prolific screenwriters, able to write a full screenplay in two to eight weeks. According to Samuel Goldwyn biographer, Carol Easton, in 1931, with his writing partner Charles MacArthur, he "knocked out The Unholy Garden in twelve hours. Hecht subsequently received a fan letter from producer Arthur Hornblow, Jr.:

After reading your magnificent script, Mr. Goldwyn and I both wish to go on record with the statement that if The Unholy Garden isn't the finest motion picture Samuel Goldwyn has ever produced, the fault will be entirely ours. You have done your part superbly.

It was produced exactly as written, and 'became one of the biggest, yet funniest, bombs ever made by a studio'."

Censorship, profit, and art

Despite his monetary success, however, Hecht always kept Hollywood at arms' length. According to film historian Gregory Black, "he did not consider his work for the movies serious art; it was more a means of replenishing his bank account. When his work was finished, he retreated to New York."

At least part of the reason for this was due to the industry's system of censorship. Black writes, "as Mankiewicz, Selznick, and Hecht knew all too well, much of the blame for the failure of the movies to deal more frankly and honestly with life, lay with a rigid censorship imposed on the industry ... [and] on the content of films during its golden era of studio production." Because the costs of production and distribution were so high, the primary "goal of the studios was profit, not art ... [and] fearful of losing any segment of their audiences, the studios either carefully avoided controversial topics or presented them in a way that evaded larger issues", thereby creating only "harmless entertainment".

According to historian David Thomson, "to their own minds, Herman Mankiewicz and Ben Hecht both died morose and frustrated. Neither of them had written the great books they believed possible."

with Howard Hawks

In an interview with director Howard Hawks, with whom Hecht worked on many films, Scott Breivold elicited comments on the way they often worked:

Breivold. Could you explain how the day-to-day writing goes on a script? Hawks. Well, when Hecht and MacArthur and I used to work on a script, we'd sit in a room and work for two hours and then we'd play backgammon for an hour. Then we'd start again and one of us would be one character and one would be another character. We'd read our lines of dialogue and the whole idea was to try to stump the other people, to see if they could think of something crazier than you could.

with David O. Selznick

According to film historian Virginia Wexman,

David Selznick had a flair for the dramatic, and no one knew that better than Ben Hecht. The two collaborated on some of Hollywood's biggest hits – movies like Gone With the Wind and Notorious and Duel in the Sun – and often enough, the making of those films was as rife with conflict as the films themselves

Nothing Sacred is probably the "most famous of all the Carole Lombard films next to My Man Godfrey", wrote movie historian James Harvey. And it impressed people at the time with its evident ambition "and Selznick determined to make the classiest of all screwball comedies, turned to Lombard as a necessity, but also to Ben Hecht, nearly the hottest screenwriter in Hollywood at the time, especially for comedy. ... it was also the first screwball comedy to lay apparent claim to larger satiric meanings, to make scathing observations about American life and society."

In an interview with Irene Selznick, ex-wife of producer David O. Selznick, she discussed the other leading screenwriters of that time:

They all aspired to be Ben. The resourcefulness of his mind, his vitality were so enormous. His knowledge. His talent and ambition. He could tear through things, and he tore through life. They'd see this prodigious output of Ben's, and they'd think, "Oh, hell, I'm a bum." I think it must have been devastating. Ben did it to MacArthur, who died in time to save his reputation. And I'd hate to have been Herman [Mankiewicz], caught between Kaufman and Hecht.

with Ernst Lubitsch

According to James Harvey, Ernst Lubitsch felt uneasy in the world of playwright Noël Coward.

"If Coward could write his play for three particular actors, he reasoned to an interviewer, why couldn't it be rewritten for three others? It was at this point ... that he turned to Ben Hecht ... to work with him on the screenplay for Design for Living." It was the only Lubitsch-Hecht collaboration. Harvey adds, "Though Lubitsch must have been reassured by Hecht's taking the job. No writer in Hollywood had better credentials in the tough, slangy, specifically American style that Lubitsch wanted to impart to the Coward play. And together, they transformed it."

=== Styles of writing ===
According to Siegel, "The talkie era put writers like Hecht at a premium because they could write dialogue in the quirky, idiosyncratic style of the common man. Hecht, in particular, was wonderful with slang, and he peppered his films with the argot of the streets. He also had a lively sense of humor and an uncanny ability to ground even the most outrageous stories successfully with credible, fast-paced plots." Hecht, his friend Budd Schulberg wrote many years ago, "seemed the personification of the writer at the top of his game, the top of his world, not gnawing at doubting himself as great writers were said to do, but with every word and every gesture indicating the animal pleasure he took in writing well".

"Movies", Hecht was to recall, "were seldom written. In 1927, they were yelled into existence in conferences that kept going in saloons, brothels, and all-night poker games. Movie sets roared with arguments and organ music."

He was best known for two specific and contrasting types of film: crime thrillers and screwball comedies. Among crime thrillers, Hecht was responsible for such films as The Unholy Night (1929), the classic Scarface (1932), and Hitchcock's Notorious. Among his comedies, there were The Front Page, which led to many remakes, Noël Coward's Design for Living (1933), Twentieth Century, Nothing Sacred, and Howard Hawks's Monkey Business (1952).

Film historian Richard Corliss wrote, "it is his crisp, frenetic, sensational prose and dialogue style that elevates his work above that of the dozens of other reporters who streamed west to cover and exploit Hollywood's biggest 'story': the talkie revolution."

=== Notable screenplays ===
Underworld (1927)

Underworld was the story of a petty hoodlum with political pull; it was based on a real Chicago gangster Hecht knew. "The film began the gangster film genre that became popular in the early 1930s.". It and Scarface were "the alpha and omega of Hollywood's first gangster craze". In it, he "manages both to congratulate journalism for its importance and to chastise it for its chicanery, by underlining the newspapers' complicity in promoting the underworld image".

Like so many of his films, Underworld and Scarface are "stories" that ace-reporter Hecht loved to cover, as much for the larger-than-life qualities of his headliners as for the enormity of their crimes. Love-hate ... fascination-revulsion ... exposé-glorification ... these are the polarities that make Hecht's best films deliciously ambiguous.

Hecht's introduction, which is nothing if not moody and Sandburgian, describes "A great city in the dead of night – streets lonely, moon-flooded – buildings empty as the cliff-dwellings of a forgotten age."

Hecht was noted for confronting producers and directors when he wasn't satisfied with the way they used his scripts. For this film, at one point he demanded that its director, Josef von Sternberg, remove his name from the credits since Sternberg unilaterally changed one scene. Afterward, however, he relented and took credit for the film's story, which went on to win the Academy Award for Best Original Screenplay – the first year the awards were presented.

The Front Page (1931)

After contributing to the original stories for a number of films, he worked without credit on the first film version of his original 1928 play The Front Page. It was produced by Howard Hughes and directed by Lewis Milestone in 1931. James Harvey writes,

it is Hecht and MacArthur's Chicago ... that counts most deeply in the imagination of Hollywood. And their play, the first of the great newspaper comedies, did more to define the tone and style, the look and the sound of Hollywood comedy than any other work of its time.

Of the original play, theater producer and writer Jed Harris writes,

here is a play which reflects miraculously the real as well as the literary personalities of the playwrights. Every line of it glows with a demoniacal humor, sordid, insolent, and mischievous to the point of downright perversity, in which one instantly recognizes the heroic comic spirit of its authors ... Both Hecht and MacArthur owe their literary origins to the newspapers of Chicago. Famous crime reporters, their talents were first cradled in the recounting of great exploits in arson, rape, murder, gang war, and municipal politics. Out of a welter of jailbreaks, hangings, floods, and whore-house raidings, they have gathered the rich, savory characters who disport themselves on the stage to Times Square Theatre.

Eddie Muller observed that "Hecht and MacArthur's ribald rat-a-tat dialogue ... instantly created a new American archetype—the fast-talking, hard-drinking newshound who'll do anything for a scoop."

Scarface (1932)

After ushering in the beginning of the gangster films with Underworld, his next film became one of the best films of that genre. Scarface was directed by Howard Hawks, with "Hecht the wordsmith and Hawks the engineer", who became "one of the few directors with whom Hecht enjoyed working". It starred Paul Muni playing the role of an Al Capone-like gangster. "Scarface's all-but-suffocating vitality is a kind of cinematic version of tabloid prose at its best."

The story of how Scarface came to be written represents Hecht's writing style in those days. Film historian Max Wilk interviewed Leyland Hayward, an independent literary agent, who, in 1931, managed to convince Hecht that a young oil tycoon in Texas named Howard Hughes wanted him to write the screenplay to his first book. Hayward wrote about that period:

So I went back to Hughes, and told him I'd been able to persuade Hecht to do his script; I told him Ben's terms, – $1,000 per day – and Howard didn't blink an eye. He nodded, and said, 'Okay-it's a deal. But you tell Hecht I want a real tough shoot-'em-up script that'll knock the audience out of its seats, okay?'

"So Ben went to work", added Hayward. Hayward was to receive 10% of Hecht's fees as his commission. "He was a hell of a fast writer – sometimes too fast. I didn't even know how fast he could go ... At the end of the first day, I went back to Ben's house. There he was, typing away ... I said, 'Ben – please slow down.' Over the next few days, 'while watching the accumulated pages of Hecht's script growing higher and higher, 'I couldn't slow the guy down!', sighed Hayward, who only made his commission for each day Hecht worked.

I came by his home the next day ... 'I've got an idea. I'm going to finish this damn thing tomorrow', Ben told me. 'Ben—for God's sake!', I said. 'Can't you slow down a little? Hughes isn't interested in you setting some sort of a speed record for writing!'

But it was as if young Hayward had set out to flag down an army tank. Nothing stopped Hecht. On the night of the ninth day, Hayward arrived with his daily payment from Hughes, to find Hecht lounging in a chair, enjoying a highball.

Hecht waved at his stack of manuscript. 'Done', he announced. 'Finished the damn thing'.

Nine thousand dollars – for the screenplay of Scarface? sighed Hayward. ... Hughes was tickled with Ben's script; he showed it to Howard Hawks. Hawks loved it, and then they picked up this wonderful young actor from New York, Paul Muni, to play the lead. The picture went out and cleaned up – made a bundle for Hughes ... And if old Ben really outsmarted himself on that one ... he didn't care. He was on to something else. Ben was always on to something else."

Twentieth Century (1934)

For his next film, Twentieth Century, he wrote the screenplay in collaboration with Charles MacArthur as an adaptation of their original play from 1932. It was directed by Howard Hawks, and starred John Barrymore and Carole Lombard. It is a comedy about a Broadway producer who was losing his leading lady to the seductive Hollywood film industry, and will do anything to win her back.

It is "a fast-paced, witty film that contains the rapid-fire dialogue for which Hecht became famous. It is one of the first, and finest, of the screwball comedies of the 1930s."

Viva Villa! (1934)

This was the story about Mexican rebel, Pancho Villa, who takes to the hills after killing an overseer in revenge for his father's death. It was directed by Howard Hawks and starred Wallace Beery. Although the movie took liberties with the facts, it became a great success, and Hecht received an Academy Award nomination for his screenplay adaptation.

In a letter from the film's producer, David O. Selznick, to studio head Louis B. Mayer, Selznick discussed the need for a script rewrite:

I have arranged with Ben Hecht to do the final script of Viva Villa! ... On the quality, we are protected not merely by Hecht's ability, but by the clause that the work must be to my satisfaction. It may seem like a short space of time for a man to do a complete new script, but Hecht is famous for his speed, and did the entire job on Scarface in eleven days.

Barbary Coast (1935)

Barbary Coast was also directed by Howard Hawks and starred Miriam Hopkins and Edward G. Robinson. The film takes place in late nineteenth century San Francisco with Hopkins playing the role of a dance-hall girl up against Robinson, who runs the town.

The Scoundrel (1935)

Hecht and Macarthur left Hollywood and went back to New York where they wrote produced and co-directed "The Scoundrel" marking the American film debut of Noël Coward. Reminiscent of Molnar's "Liliom", the movie won the Academy Award for Best Original Story.

Nothing Sacred (1938)

Nothing Sacred became Hecht's first project after he and Charles MacArthur closed their failing film company, which they started in 1934. The film was adapted from his play, Hazel Flagg, and starred Carole Lombard as a small-town girl diagnosed with radium poisoning. "A reporter makes her case a cause for his newspaper." The story "allowed Hecht to work with one of his favorite themes, hypocrisy (especially among journalists); he took the themes of lying, decadence, and immorality, and made them into a sophisticated screwball comedy".

Gunga Din (1939)

Gunga Din was co-written with Charles MacArthur, and became "one of Hollywood's greatest action-adventure films". The screenplay was based on the poem by Rudyard Kipling, directed by George Stevens and starred Cary Grant and Douglas Fairbanks, Jr. In 1999, the film was deemed "culturally significant" by the United States Library of Congress.

Wuthering Heights (1939)

After working without credit on Gone with the Wind in 1939, he co-wrote (with Charles MacArthur) an adaptation of Emily Brontë's novel, Wuthering Heights. Although the screenplay was cut off at the story's half-way point, as it was considered too long, it was nominated for an Academy Award.

It's a Wonderful World (1939)

Movie historian James Harvey notes that in some respects It's a Wonderful World is an even more accomplished film – the comedy counterpart to the supremely assured and high-spirited work Van Dyke had accomplished with San Francisco (1936). "Ben Hecht, another speed specialist, wrote the screenplay (from a story by Hecht and Herman Mankiewicz); it's in his Front Page vein, with admixtures of It Happened One Night and Bringing Up Baby, as well as surprising adumbrations of the nineteen-forties private-eye film."

Angels Over Broadway (1940)

Angels Over Broadway was one of only two movies he directed, produced, and wrote originally for film, the other was Specter of the Rose (1946). Angels Over Broadway was considered "one of his most personal works". It starred Douglas Fairbanks, Jr. and Rita Hayworth and was nominated for an Academy Award. "The dialogue as well as the script's descriptive passages are chock full of brittle Hechtian similes that sparkle on the page, but turn leaden when delivered. Hecht was an endlessly articulate raconteur. In his novels and memoirs, articulation dominates".

In the script, he experimented with "reflections of life – as if a ghost were drifting in the rain". These "reflections" of sidewalks, bridges, glass, and neon make the film a visual prototype of the nineteen-forties film noir.

Alfred Hitchcock's Spellbound (1945) and Notorious (1946)

For Alfred Hitchcock he wrote a number of his best psycho-dramas and received his final Academy Award nomination for Notorious. He also worked without credit on Hitchcock's next two films, The Paradine Case (1947) and Rope (1948). Spellbound, the first time Hitchcock worked with Hecht, is notable for being one of the first Hollywood movies to deal seriously with the subject of psychoanalysis.

Monkey Business (1952)

In 1947, he teamed up with Charles Lederer, and co-wrote three films: Her Husband's Affairs, Kiss of Death, and Ride the Pink Horse. In 1950, he co-wrote The Thing without credit. They again teamed up to write the 1952 screwball comedy, Monkey Business, which became Hecht's last true success as a screenwriter.

==== Uncredited films ====
Among the better-known films he helped write without being credited are Gone with the Wind, The Shop Around the Corner, Foreign Correspondent, His Girl Friday (the second film version of his play The Front Page), The Sun Also Rises, Mutiny on the Bounty, Casino Royale (1967), and The Greatest Show on Earth. According to Edward White, Hecht's last minute script rewrite for Gone with the Wind (Hecht had never read the novel), likely saved it from box office disaster, lending credence to Hecht's nickname as the "Shakespeare of Hollywood", even though Hecht saw it as an example of how bad Hollywood's movies really are.

Often, the only evidence of Hecht's involvement in a movie screenplay has come from letters.

The following are snippets of letters discussing The Sun Also Rises, based on the novel by Ernest Hemingway:

Letter by David O. Selznick to Hecht, December 19, 1956:

My present feeling is that eighty percent of the script is eighty per cent right, and that twenty per cent of it is eighty per cent wrong. That's pretty damn good, considering the time we spent on it, even though it was twice as long as you normally spend. So let's really try to do a job that will be ... something that we can be proud of for many years to come ...

Letter by Selznick to John Huston, April 3, 1957:

It is certainly not demeaning your talent to say that I don't think there is anybody alive who can come in on a job at the last minute and revise, without serious danger, work to which two old hands like Ben and myself have devoted many, many months of most careful work and devoted effort ... it is also true that I have never seen Ben or anyone else bring to a job more thorough analysis, more willingness to rewrite, than he has.

The following letter discusses Portrait of Jennie (1948):

Letter by Selznick to Hecht, November 24, 1948:

Dear Ben: Very many thanks in advance for coming to the rescue again ... the audience was enchanted ... and it set the mood beautifully for the picture ... It needs the type of cinematic forward journalese of which you are the only master I know ... In any event, I shall be eagerly awaiting your redraft, which can take an entirely different form ... either actual or Hechtian creations

Gone with the Wind (1939)

For original screenplay writer Sidney Howard, film historian Joanne Yeck writes,

reducing the intricacies of Gone with the Wind's epic dimensions was a herculean task ... and Howard's first submission was far too long, and would have required at least six hours of film; ... [producer] Selznick wanted Howard to remain on the set to make revisions ... but Howard refused to leave New England, [and] as a result, revisions were handled by a host of local writers, including Ben Hecht

Producer David O. Selznick replaced the film's director three weeks into filming and then had the script rewritten. He sought out director Victor Fleming, who, at the time, was directing The Wizard of Oz. Fleming was dissatisfied with the script, so Selznick brought in famed writer Ben Hecht to rewrite the entire screenplay within five days.

Hecht was not credited, however, for his contribution, and Sidney Howard received the Academy Award for Best Screenplay.

In a letter from Selznick to film editor O'Shea [October 19, 1939], Selznick discussed how the writing credits should appear, taking into consideration that Sidney Howard had died a few months earlier after a farm-tractor accident at his home in Massachusetts:

To Mr. O'Shea: Some time ago, it was my intention to have, in addition to the Sidney Howard credit on Gone With the Wind, a list of contributing writers. I would rather now abandon this idea, first because, while it is true that Sidney Howard did only a portion of the script ... [but] because I don't want to deprive Sidney Howard, and more particularly his widow, of any of the glory that may be attendant upon his last job.

In a letter [September 25, 1939] from Selznick to Hecht, regarding writing introductory sequences and titles, which were used to set the scene and condense the narrative throughout the movie, Selznick wrote,

Dear Ben: There are only seven titles needed for Gone With the Wind and I am certain you could bat them out in a few minutes, especially since a few of them can be based on titles you wrote while you were here. Will you do these for me in accordance with your promise? ... Very anxious to get picture into laboratory at once and would appreciate it if you could tackle them immediately upon their receipt

His Girl Friday (1940)

"His Girl Friday remains not just the fastest-talking romantic comedy ever made, but a very tricky inquiry into love's need for a chase (or a dream) and the sharpest pointer to uncertain gender roles."

The D.C. Examiner writes,

Director Howard Hawks' 1940 classic "His Girl Friday" is not just one of the funniest screwball comedies ever made, it is also one of the finest film adaptations of a stage play. "Hawks took Ben Hecht and Charles MacArthur's Broadway hit "The Front Page", the best play about newspapers ever written, and, by changing the gender of a major character, turned it into a romantic comedy. The new script was by Hecht (uncredited) and Charles Lederer.

Casino Royale (1967)

Hecht wrote the first screenplay for Ian Fleming's first novel, Casino Royale. Although the final screenplay and film was made into a comedy spoof, Hecht's version was written as a straight Bond adventure, states spy novelist Jeremy Duns, who recently discovered the original lost scripts. According to Duns, Hecht's version included elements hard to imagine in a film adaptation, adding that "these drafts are a master-class in thriller-writing, from the man who arguably perfected the form with Notorious." Hecht wrote that he has "never had more fun writing a movie", and felt the James Bond character was cinema's first "gentleman superman" in a long time, as opposed to Hammett and Chandler's "roughneck supermen".

Hecht died few days before the final screenplay was announced to the press.

Duns compares Hecht's unpublished screenplay with the final rewritten film:

All the pages in Hecht's papers are gripping, but the material from April 1964 is phenomenal, and it's easy to imagine it as the basis for a classic Bond adventure. Hecht's treatment of the romance element is powerful and convincing, even with the throwaway ending, but there is also a distinctly adult feel to the story. It has all the excitement and glamour you would expect from a Bond film, but is more suspenseful, and the violence is brutal rather than cartoonish.

== Personal life ==
Hecht married Marie Armstrong (1892–1956), a gentile, in 1915, when he was 21, and they had a daughter, Edwina (1916–1991), who would grow up to be an actress. He later met Rose Caylor, a writer, and together they left Chicago (and his family) in 1924, moving to New York. He was divorced from Armstrong in 1925. He married Caylor that same year, and they remained married until Hecht's death in 1964.

On July 30, 1943, Ben and Rose had a daughter, Jenny Hecht, who became an actress at the age of 8. She died of a drug overdose on March 25, 1971, at the age of 27, shortly after completing her third movie appearance. A play about Jenny's brief life, The Screenwriter's Daughter by Larry Mollin, was staged in London in October 2015.

=== Activism ===
==== Civil rights ====
According to Hecht historian Florice Whyte Kovan, he became active in promoting civil rights early in his career.

in the early 1920s, Hecht organized campaigns against the Ku Klux Klan, whose lynchings of minorities, primarily blacks, terrorized the American South and North ... Artists and writers joined the effort, blending civil rights into the arts and literary scene ...

Hecht wrote enough stories about black-white dynamics to form a small collection, including To Bert Williams, a richly symbolic obituary to the eminent vaudevillian, the thought-provoking The Miracle ... In the same period, circa May–June 1923, Hecht ... collaborated on a musical with Dave Payton (Peyton), jazz pianist and music critic for the black newspaper the Chicago Defender ... He broke taboos by publishing a regular column, Black-belt Shadows, about Chicago and broader AfroAmerica by young William Moore – with the then-daring editorial note: "This column is conducted by a Negro journalist". A factor in his willingness to work with blacks on occasion was his first playwriting experience: his collaborator was a young black student.

Hecht film stories featuring black characters included Hallelujah, I'm a Bum, co-starring Edgar Conner as Al Jolson's sidekick in a politically savvy, rhymed dialogue over Richard Rodgers music. Jolson, a noted blackface performer and star of The Jazz Singer, was also active in promoting racial equality on the Broadway stage.

Hecht's most important race film historically was the Frank Capra message film The Negro Soldier, a feature-length tribute shown to the armed forces and civilians during World War II.

==== World War II ====
Hecht was among a number of signers of a formal statement, issued in July 1941, calling for the "utmost material assistance by our government to England, the Soviet Union, and China". Among those who signed were former Nobel Prize winners in science and other people eminent in education, literature, and the arts. It advocated

the protection of civil liberties and the rights of labor, ... the elimination of all forms of racial and religious discrimination from our public and private life ... [and] the worldwide defense of human liberty ... There can be no victory over Hitlerism abroad if democracy is destroyed at home.

Later that year, he had his first large-scale musical collaboration with symphonic composer Ferde Grofe on their patriotic cantata, Uncle Sam Stands Up.

==== Jewishness ====
Hecht claimed that he had never experienced anti-Semitism in his life, and claimed to have had little to do with Judaism, but "was drawn back to the Lower East Side late in life and lived for a while on Henry Street, where he could absorb the energy and social consciousness of the ghetto", wrote author Sanford Sternlicht. In 1931, he published a novel, A Jew in Love, for which he was called a "self-hating Jew", and which has been analysed as a product of a generation of Jewish writers seeking to escape their parents' immigrant past.

His indifference to Jewish issues changed when he met Peter Bergson, who was drumming up American assistance for the Zionist group Irgun. Hecht wrote in his book, Perfidy, that he used to be a scriptwriter until his meeting with Bergson, when he accidentally bumped into history: that is, the burning need to do anything possible to save the doomed Jews of Europe (paraphrase from Perfidy). As Hecht relates it in A Child of the Century, he didn't feel particularly Jewish in his daily life until Bergson shook him out of his assimilated complacency: Bergson invited Hecht to ask three close friends whether, in their opinion, Hecht was an American or a Jew. All three replied that he was a Jew. (This is incorrect; in his book, A Child of the Century, Hecht says that he used that line to convince David Selznick to sponsor a mass meeting at the Hollywood canteen.)

Like many stories Hecht told about his life, that tale may be apocryphal, but after meeting Bergson, Hecht quickly became a member of his inner circle and dedicated himself to some goals of the group, particularly the rescue of Europe's Jews.

Hecht "took on a ten-year commitment to publicize the atrocities befalling his own religious minority, the Jews of Europe, and the quest for survivors to find a permanent home in the Middle East". In 1943, during the midst of the Holocaust, he predicted, in a widely published article in Reader's Digest magazine,

Of these 6,000,000 Jews [of Europe], almost a third have already been massacred by Germans, Romanians, and Hungarians, and the most conservative of scorekeepers estimate that before the war ends, at least another third will have been done to death.

Also in 1943, "out of frustration over American policy, and outrage at Hollywood's fear of offending its European markets", he organized and wrote a pageant, We Will Never Die, which was produced by Billy Rose and Ernst Lubitsch, with the help of composer Kurt Weill and staging by Moss Hart. The pageant was performed at Madison Square Garden for two shows in front of 40,000 people in March 1943. It then traveled nationwide, including a performance at the Hollywood Bowl. Hecht was disappointed nonetheless. As Weill noted afterward, "The pageant has accomplished nothing. Actually, all we have done is make a lot of Jews cry, which is not a unique accomplishment."

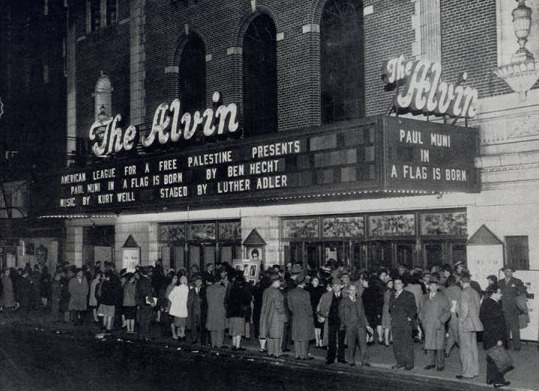
New York City opening of A Flag is Born at the Alvin Playhouse

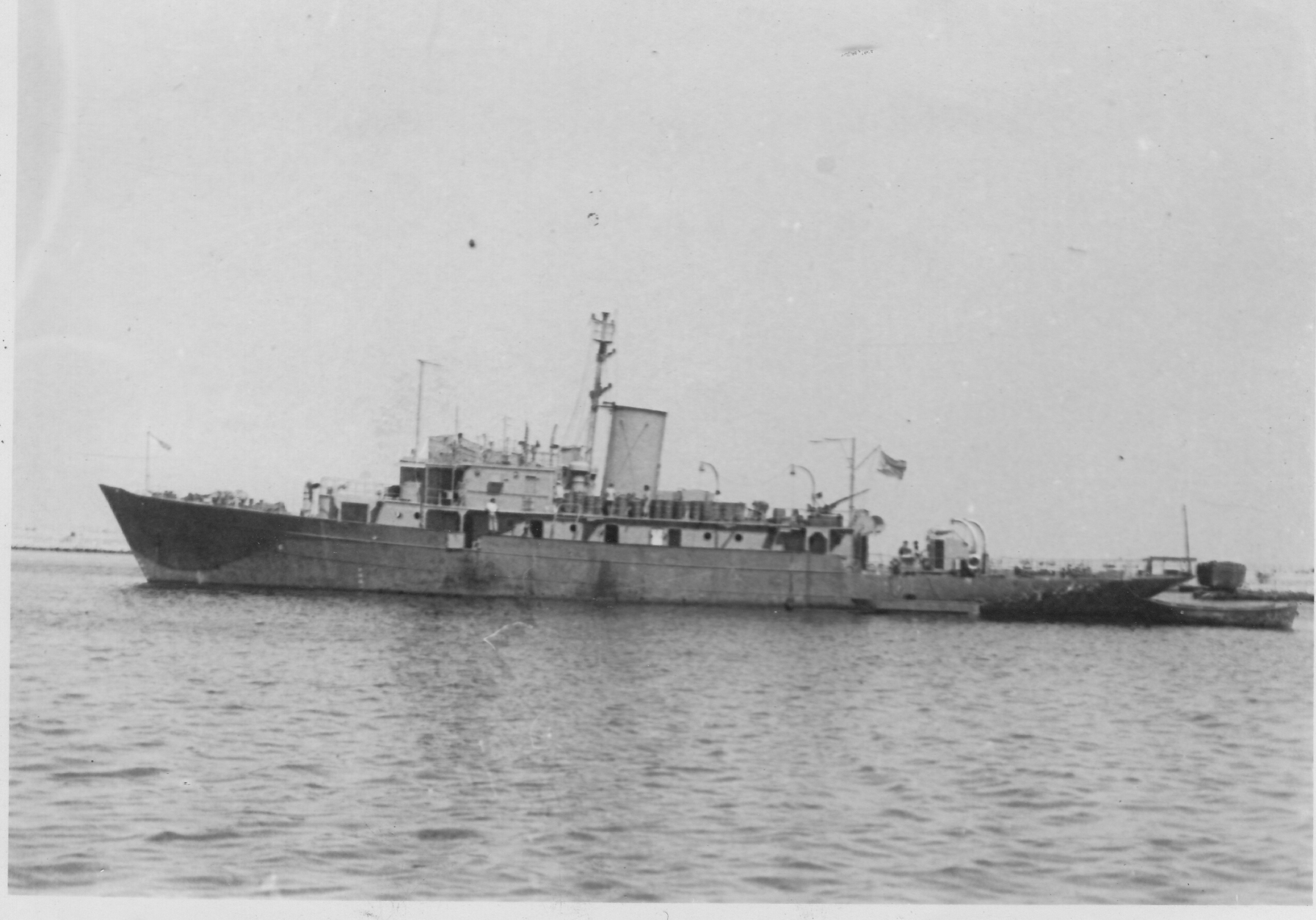
MS Ben Hecht

Following the war, Hecht openly supported the Jewish insurgency in Palestine, a campaign of violence being waged by underground Zionist groups (the Haganah, Irgun, and Lehi) in Palestine. Hecht was a member of the Bergson Group, an Irgun front group in the United States run by Peter Bergson, which was active in raising money for the Irgun's activities and disseminating Irgun propaganda.

Hecht wrote the script for the Bergson Group's production of A Flag is Born, which opened on September 5, 1946, at the Alvin Playhouse in New York City. The play, which compared the Zionist underground's campaign in Palestine to the American Revolution, was intended to increase public support for the Zionist cause in the United States. The play starred Marlon Brando and Paul Muni during its various productions. The proceeds from the play were used to purchase a ship that was renamed the MS Ben Hecht, which carried 900 Holocaust survivors to Palestine in March 1947. The Royal Navy captured the ship after it docked, and 600 of its passengers were detained as illegal immigrants and sent to the Cyprus internment camps. The SS Ben Hecht later became the flagship of the Israeli Navy. The crew was imprisoned by the British authorities in Acre Prison, and assisted in the preparations for the Acre Prison break.

Hecht's most controversial action during this period was writing an open letter to the Jewish insurgents in May 1947 which openly praised underground violence against the British. It included the highly controversial passage:

Every time you blow up a British arsenal, or wreck a British jail, or send a British railroad train sky high, or rob a British bank, or let go with your guns and bombs at the British betrayers and invaders of your homeland, the Jews of America make a little holiday in their hearts.

Six months after the establishment of Israel, the Bergson Group was dissolved, followed by a dinner in New York City where former Irgun commander Menachem Begin appeared, saying,

I believe that my people, liberated and re-assembled in its country, will contribute its full share toward the progress of all mankind ... [and predicted] that all of Palestine eventually would be free, and that peace and brotherhood would prevail among Arabs and Jews alike.

Thanks to his fundraising, speeches, and jawboning, Sternlicht writes,

"Ben Hecht did more to help Jewish refugees from the Holocaust, and to ensure the survival of the nascent state of Israel, than any other American Jew in the twentieth century". As much as anything, it was the abiding love of his Jewish parents and Rose Hecht that motivated the writer to become arguably "the most effective propagandist the Jewish state ever had. In 1964, at Hecht's funeral service at Temple Rodeph Shalom in New York City, among the eulogists was Menachem Begin."

In October 1948, the Cinematograph Exhibitors' Association, a trade union representing about 4,700 British film theaters, announced a ban on all films in which Hecht had a role. This was a result of "his intemperate utterances on the Palestine problem", according to one source. As a result, filmmakers, concerned with jeopardizing the British market, became more reluctant to hire Hecht. Hecht cut his fee in half and wrote screenplays under pseudonyms or completely anonymously to evade the boycott, which was lifted in 1952.

== Death ==
Hecht died of a heart attack at his home on April 18, 1964, aged 70.

== Academy Award nominations ==
Year (Note: Indicates the year of the ceremony.)	Category	Work	Result
1927/28	Best Writing (Original Story)	Underworld	Won
1934	Best Adaptation	Viva Villa!	Nominated
1935	Best Original Story	The Scoundrel	Won
1939	Best Screenplay	Wuthering Heights	Nominated
1940	Best Original Screenplay	Angels Over Broadway	Nominated
1946	Best Original Screenplay	Notorious	Nominated

== Works ==
=== Screenplays ===
- Casino Royale (1967) (uncredited)
- Circus World
- 7 Faces of Dr. Lao (uncredited)
- Cleopatra (1963) (uncredited)
- Billy Rose's Jumbo
- Mutiny on the Bounty (1962) (uncredited)
- Walk on the Wild Side (uncredited)
- North to Alaska (uncredited)
- John Paul Jones (uncredited)
- The Gun Runners (uncredited)
- Queen of Outer Space
- Legend of the Lost
- The Sun Also Rises (1957)
- A Farewell to Arms (1957)
- Miracle in the Rain
- The Iron Petticoat
- The Hunchback of Notre Dame (1956) (uncredited)
- Trapeze (1956) (uncredited)
- The Court-Martial of Billy Mitchell (uncredited)
- The Indian Fighter
- The Man with the Golden Arm (1955) (uncredited)
- Guys and Dolls (uncredited)
- Living It Up (based on his play Hazel Flagg)
- Ulysses (1955)
- Light's Diamond Jubilee (television)
- Terminal Station (1953) (uncredited)
- Angel Face (1952) (uncredited)
- Hans Christian Andersen (uncredited)
- Monkey Business (1952)
- Actors and Sin (1952) (also directed and produced)
- The Wild Heart (1952) (uncredited)
- The Thing from Another World (uncredited)
- The Secret of Convict Lake (uncredited)
- Strangers on a Train (1951) (uncredited)
- September Affair (uncredited)
- Where the Sidewalk Ends (1950)
- Edge of Doom (uncredited)
- Perfect Strangers (1950)
- Love Happy (uncredited)
- The Inspector General (uncredited)
- Whirlpool (1950)
- Roseanna McCoy (uncredited)
- Big Jack (uncredited)
- Portrait of Jennie (uncredited)
- Cry of the City (uncredited)
- Rope (1948) (uncredited)
- The Miracle of the Bells
- Dishonored Lady (uncredited)
- Her Husband's Affairs
- The Paradine Case (1947) (uncredited)
- Ride the Pink Horse (1947)
- Kiss of Death (1947)
- Duel in the Sun (1946) (uncredited)
- Notorious (1946)
- A Flag is Born
- Specter of the Rose (1946) (also directed and produced)
- Gilda (uncredited) (1946)
- Cornered (1945) (uncredited)
- Spellbound (1945)
- Watchtower Over Tomorrow (1945 OWI film)
- Lifeboat (1944) (uncredited)
- The Outlaw (1943) (uncredited)
- China Girl (1942)
- Journey into Fear (1943) (uncredited)
- The Black Swan (1942)
- Ten Gentlemen from West Point (uncredited)
- Roxie Hart (uncredited)
- Lydia
- The Mad Doctor (1941) (uncredited)
- Comrade X
- Second Chorus (uncredited)
- Angels Over Broadway (1940) (also directed and produced)
- Foreign Correspondent (1940) (final scene-uncredited)
- The Shop Around the Corner (1940) (uncredited)
- His Girl Friday (1940)
- I Take This Woman (1940) (uncredited)
- Gone with the Wind (1939) (uncredited)
- At the Circus (uncredited)
- Lady of the Tropics
- It's a Wonderful World (1939)
- Wuthering Heights (1939)
- Let Freedom Ring
- Stagecoach (1939) (uncredited)
- Gunga Din (1939)
- Angels with Dirty Faces (1938) (uncredited)
- The Goldwyn Follies
- Nothing Sacred (1937)
- The Hurricane (1937) (uncredited)
- The Prisoner of Zenda (1937) (uncredited)
- Woman Chases Man (uncredited)
- King of Gamblers (uncredited)
- A Star Is Born (1937) (uncredited)
- Soak the Rich (also directed)
- The Scoundrel (1935) (also directed)
- Spring Tonic
- Barbary Coast
- Once in a Blue Moon (1935) (also directed)
- The Florentine Dagger
- The President Vanishes (uncredited)
- Crime Without Passion (1934) (also directed)
- Shoot the Works
- Twentieth Century (1934) (uncredited)
- Upperworld
- Viva Villa! (1934)
- Riptide (1934) (uncredited)
- Queen Christina (1933) (uncredited)
- Design for Living (1933)
- Turn Back the Clock
- Topaze (1933)
- Hallelujah, I'm a Bum (1933)
- Back Street (1932) (uncredited)
- Rasputin and the Empress (1932) (uncredited)
- Million Dollar Legs (1932) (uncredited)
- Scarface (1932)
- The Beast of the City (1932) (uncredited)
- The Unholy Garden (1931)
- The Sin of Madelon Claudet (1931) (uncredited)
- Homicide Squad (1931) (uncredited)
- Quick Millions (1931) (uncredited)
- The Front Page (1931) (uncredited)
- Le Spectre vert
- Roadhouse Nights (1930)
- Street of Chance (1930) (uncredited)
- The Unholy Night (1929)
- The Great Gabbo (1929)
- The Big Noise (1928)
- The American Beauty (1916) (uncredited)
- Underworld (1927)
- The New Klondike (1926) (uncredited)

=== Books ===
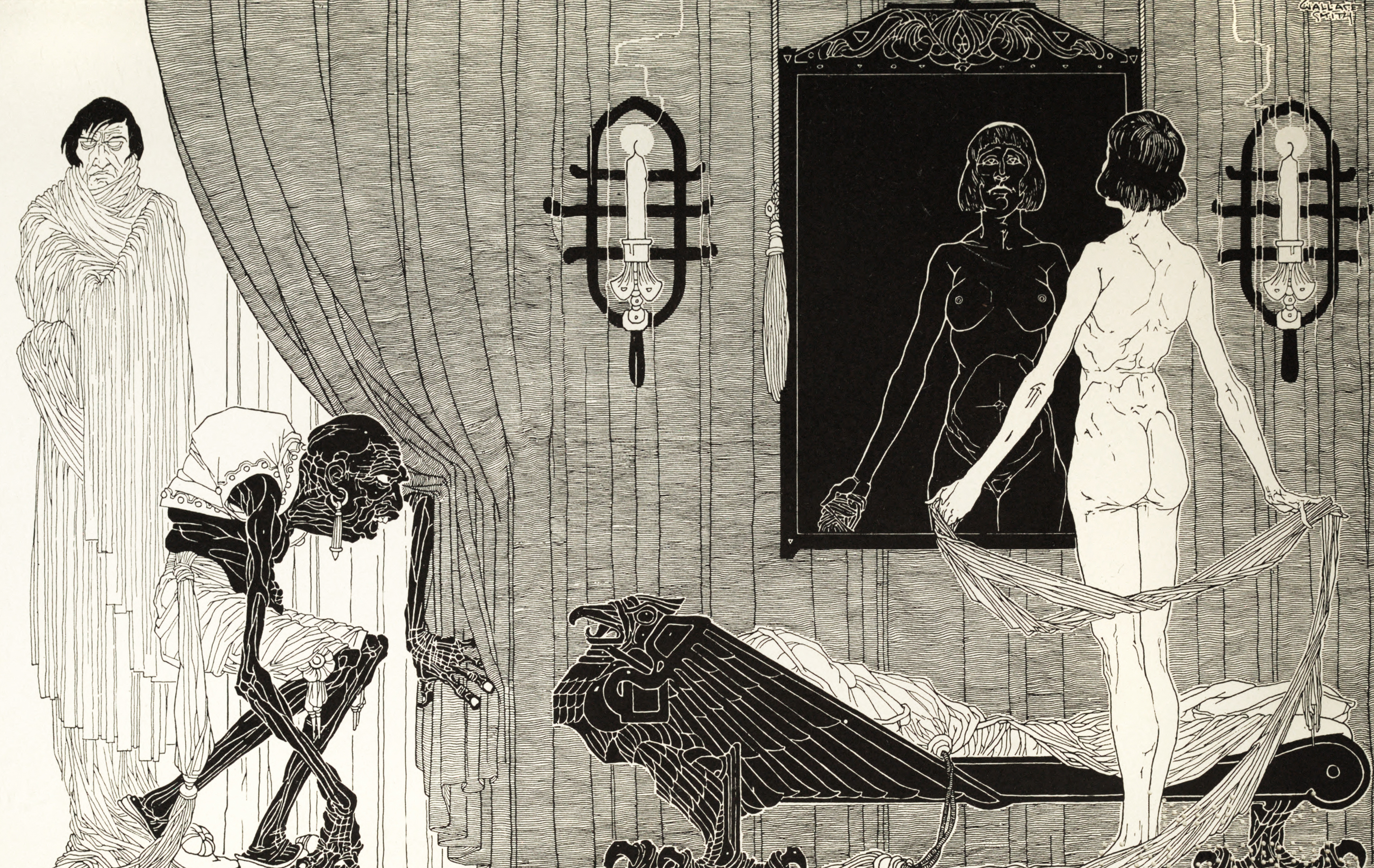
Fantazius Mallare, (1922) Wallace Smith (illustrator)

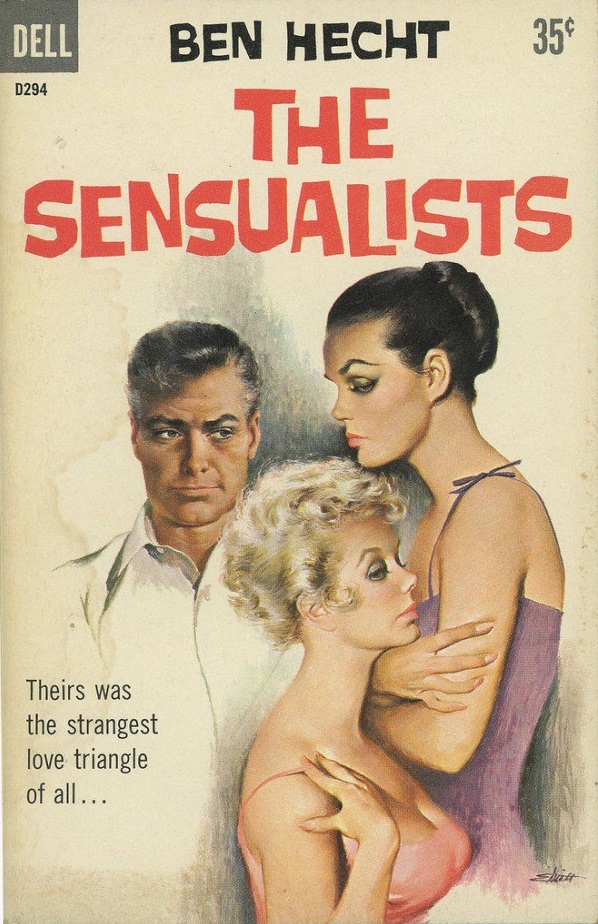
The Sensualists (1959) Freeman Elliott (illustrator)

- Erik Dorn (1921).
- Hecht, Ben (1922). A Thousand and One Afternoons in Chicago. Chicago: McGee/Covici.
- Gargoyles (New York: Boni & Liveright, 1922)
- Fantazius Mallare : a mysterious oath (Chicago: Covici-McGee, 1922)
- The Florentine dagger : a novel for amateur detectives (New York: Boni & Liveright, 1923)
- Kingdom of Evil, 211pp., Pascal Covici (1924)
- Humpty Dumpty, 383 pp., Boni & Liveright (1924)
- Broken Necks, Containing More 1001 Afternoons, 344pp., Pascal Covici (1926)
- Count Bruga, 319 pp., Boni & Liveright (1926)
- A Jew in Love, 341 pp., Covici, Friede (1931)
- The Champion from Far Away (1931)
- Actor's Blood (1936)
- The Book of Miracles, 465 pp., Viking Press (1939)
- 1001 Afternoons in New York (The Viking Press, 1941.)
- Miracle in the Rain (1943)
- A Guide for the Bedevilled, 276 pages, Charles Scribner's Sons (1944); reissued by Milah Press in 1999
- I Hate Actors! (New York: Crown Publishers, 1944)
- The Collected Stories of Ben Hecht, 524 pp., Crown (1945)
- The Cat That Jumped Out of the Story, John C. Winston Company (1947)
- Cutie – A Warm Mamma, 77 pp., Boar's Head Books (1952) (co-authored with Maxwell Bodenheim)
- A Child of the Century 672 pp. Plume (1954) (May 30, 1985) ISBN
- Charlie: The Improbable Life and Times of Charles MacArthur, 242 pp., Harper (1957)
- The Sensualists (1959)
- A Treasury of Ben Hecht: Collected Stories and Other Writings (1959, anthology)
- Perfidy (with critical supplements), 281 pp. (plus 29 pp.), Julian Messner (1962); reissued by Milah Press in 1997; about the 1954–1955 Kastner trial in Jerusalem
- Gaily, Gaily, Signet (1963) (November 1, 1969) ISBN
- Concerning a Woman of Sin, 222 pp., Mayflower (1964)
- Letters from Bohemia (Garden City, NY: Doubleday & Co, 1964)
- Hecht, Ben; Monroe, Marilyn (1974). My story. New York: Stein and Day.

=== Plays ===
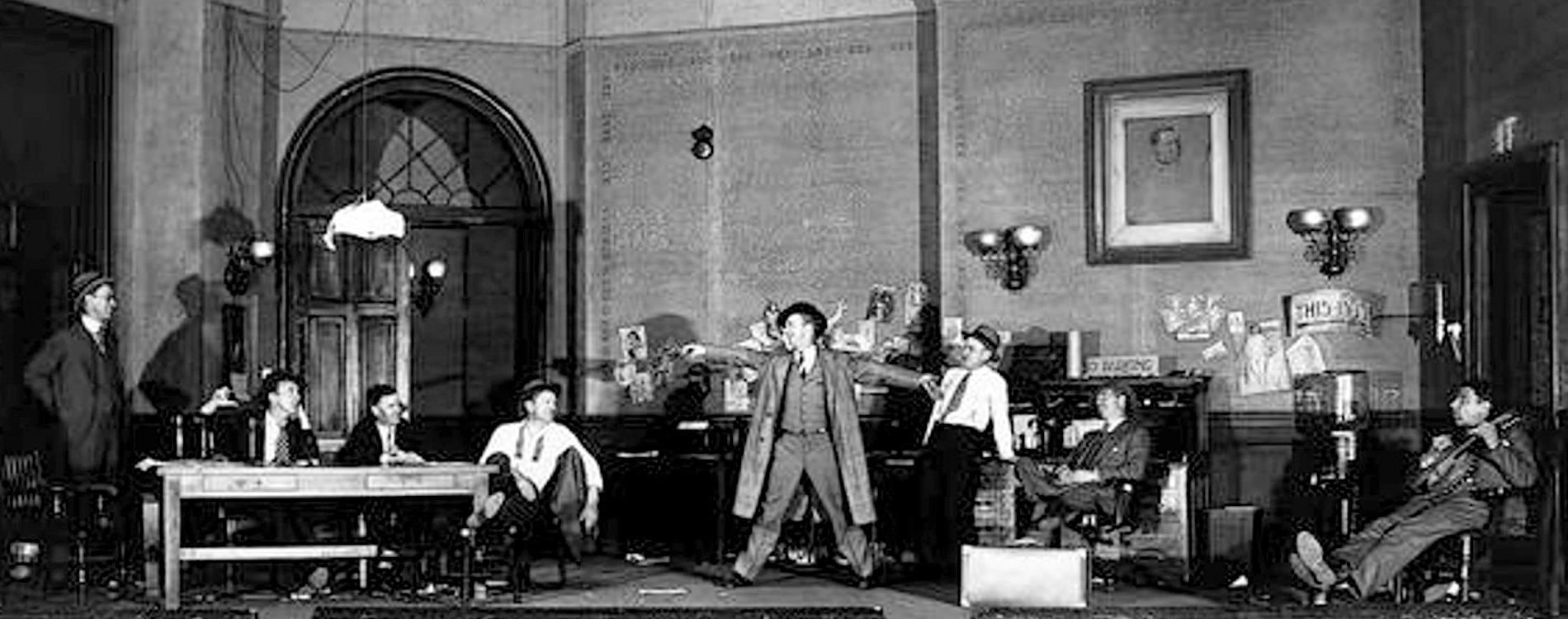
The Front Page (1928)

- The Hero of Santa Maria (1916) [co-written with Kenneth Sawyer Goodman]
- The Egotist (1922)
- The Stork (1925)
- The Front Page (1928)
- The Great Magoo (1932)
- Twentieth Century (1932)
- Jumbo (1935)
- To Quito and Back (1937)
- Ladies and Gentlemen (1939)
- Lily of the Valley (1942)
- Seven Lively Arts (1944)
- Swan Song (1946)
- A Flag Is Born (1946)
- Winkelberg (1958)

=== Essays and reporting ===
- Hecht, Ben (April 18, 1925). "The sacred white cow". The New Yorker. Vol. 1, no. 9. p. 8.
- — (June 6, 1925). "The bean bag corner". The New Yorker. Vol. 1, no. 16. p. 17.
- — (June 13, 1925). "The man who is just-folks". The New Yorker. Vol. 1, no. 17. p. 8.
- Literature and the bastinado

=== Musical contributions ===
- In 1937, lyricist Hecht collaborated with composer Louis Armstrong on "Red Cap", a song about the hard life of a railway porter. That summer, Louis Armstrong and his Orchestra recorded it for Decca Records, as did Erskine Hawkins's Orchestra for Vocalion. This may be Ben Hecht's only "popular" song.
- Uncle Sam Stands Up (1941) Hecht contributed the lyrics and poetry to this patriotic cantata for baritone solo, chorus, and orchestra composed by Ferde Grofe, written during the height of World War II.
- We Will Never Die (1943) a pageant he composed with Kurt Weill, with staging by Moss Hart, written partly because of Hecht's consternation with American foreign policy in Europe concerning the Holocaust and Hollywood's fear of offending the European (Axis) market
