= Preludes (Dragonlance series) =

Series of Dragonlance novels

Preludes is a series of novels comprising two trilogies set in the Dragonlance world of the Dungeons & Dragons fantasy role-playing game.

== Darkness and Light ==
Darkness and Light
- First edition
- Author: Paul B. Thompson & Tonya R. Carter
- Cover artist: Jeff Easley
- Publisher: TSR, Inc.
- Publication date: 28 September 1989
- Media type: Print (Paperback)
- Pages: 377
- ISBN: 0-88038-722-X
- OCLC: 19829030
- LC Class: CPB Box no. 1733 vol. 8

Darkness and Light, written by Paul B. Thompson and Tonya R. Carter, is the first volume in the Preludes series. This novel details the travels of Kitiara and Sturm before the beginning of Dragonlance Chronicles, as they seek to find news of Sturm's father, and eventually admit their attraction for each other.

== Kendermore ==
Kendermore
- First edition
- Author: Mary Kirchoff
- Cover artist: Jeff Easley
- Publisher: TSR, Inc.
- Publication date: November 30, 1989
- Media type: Print (Paperback)
- Pages: 346 pp
- ISBN: 0-88038-754-8
- OCLC: 51949936
- LC Class: CPB Box no. 2270 vol. 8

Kendermore, written by Mary Kirchoff, is the second novel in the Preludes series. In this novel, Tasslehoff Burrfoot is charged with violating the kender laws of prearranged marriage, and forced to return to Kendermore due to the imprisonment of his Uncle Trapspringer.

In the book, it is said that Flint Fireforge is a mountain dwarf. However, Flint is a hill dwarf who hates the mountain dwarves.

Denzil is described as a half-orc, while orcs do not exist in the Dragonlance continuity.

The novel mentions the remains of a werewolf. Lycanthropes do not exist on Krynn.

=== Reviews ===
- Review by Scott Winnett (1989) in Locus, #345 October 1989

== Brothers Majere ==
Brothers Majere
- Author: Kevin Stein
- Cover artist: Jeff Easley
- Publisher: TSR, Inc.
- Publication date: 14 January 1990
- Media type: Print (Paperback)
- Pages: 349 (paperback edition)
- ISBN: 0-88038-776-9 (paperback edition)
- OCLC: 20957164
- Dewey Decimal: 813.54
- LC Class: PS3569.T3714 B7 1989

Brothers Majere, written by Kevin Stein, is the third volume in the original Preludes series. This novel explores the love/hate relationship between the brothers Caramon and Raistlin as developed in the Chronicles and Legends trilogies. Raistlin is unable to forgive Caramon for allowing his ailing mother to die, or forgive himself for his inability to save her with his magic. Raistlin agrees to pursue their mother's last wish, but he is unaware that they are pawns in a power struggle between the gods.

=== Reception ===
John C. Bunnell reviewed Brothers Majere for Dragon magazine, calling it "narrowly the best of the Dragonlance Preludes", and noted that part of the success of the Dragonlance line "has been a product of its carefully stylized atmosphere; Stein captures the mood more accurately than have some recent writers."

== Riverwind the Plainsman ==
Riverwind the Plainsman
- Author: Paul B. Thompson & Tonya R. Carter
- Cover artist: Clyde Caldwell
- Publisher: TSR, Inc.
- Publication date: 31 March 1990
- Media type: Print (Paperback)
- Pages: 313 pp (paperback edition)
- ISBN: 0-88038-909-5 (paperback edition)
- OCLC: 21566927

Riverwind the Plainsman was written by Paul B. Thompson and Tonya R. Carter. It is the first volume in the Preludes II series, and the fourth volume in the overall Preludes series. This novel relates the courting quest of Riverwind for the hand Goldmoon. Riverwind, who had fallen out of favor with Goldmoon's father, chief of the Que-Shu tribe, because of Riverwind's belief in the old gods. Riverwind is given the task of discovering proof of the existence of his gods and return with irrefutable evidence.

== Flint the King ==
Flint the King
- Author: Mary Kirchoff & Douglas Niles
- Cover artist: Clyde Caldwell
- Publisher: TSR, Inc.
- Publication date: May 1990
- Media type: Print (Paperback)
- Pages: 308 (paperback edition)
- ISBN: 0-88038-911-7 (paperback edition)

Flint The King was written by Mary Kirchoff and Douglas Niles. It is the second volume in the Preludes II series, and the fifth volume in the overall Preludes series.

The main character is Flint Fireforge, hill dwarf and future War of the Lance hero. In the novel, he returns to his old hometown, Hillhome, where he uncovers a murder mystery that involves a member of his own family.

Flint the King was the first collaborative writing effort for authors Mary Kirchoff and Doug Niles, with Niles stating: "It doesn't mean that you do only half the work [...] Each of us did more than write half a book, but I think we came up with a better story because of it." According to Kirchoff, "we assumed that our strengths and weaknesses would offset each other. Doug does great battles and magic, and my strengths tend to be characters and dialogue, and that's worked out very nicely."

According to Kirchoff, "The first time I tried to make Flint talk, he just sat there with his lips moving. I paced around the house and drank another cup of coffee, but I just couldn't make words come out of his mouth." Her editor suggested she assign some famous personality the role of Flint, and she ended up choosing Wilfred Brimley and Yosemite Sam.

== Tanis: The Shadow Years ==
Tanis: The Shadow Years
- Author: Barbara Siegel & Scott Siegel
- Cover artist: Clyde Caldwell
- Publisher: TSR, Inc.
- Publication date: November 1990
- Media type: Print (Paperback)
- Pages: 320 (paperback edition)
- ISBN: 978-0-88038-913-6 (paperback edition)

Tanis: The Shadow Years was written by Barbara Siegel and Scott Siegel. It is the third volume in the Preludes II series, and the sixth volume in the overall Preludes series. In this novel, Tanis journeys into the memory of an old mage as his dying request, to search for the lost love of the old man and give her a chance to live on.
