= Suzanne Levine =

Suzanne Levine may refer to:

- Suzanne Levine (podiatrist), American podiatrist and foot surgeon
- Suzanne Jill Levine, American writer, poet, literary translator and scholar
- Suzanne Braun Levine, American author and editor

== See also ==
- Suzan G. LeVine, American businesswoman and diplomat
