= Kathryn Lance =

American writer (1943–2022)

- Born: November 26, 1943; El Paso, Texas, U.S.
- Died: January 29, 2022 (aged 78)
- Education: University of Arizona
- Occupation: Writer
- Writing career
- Pen name: Lynn Beach
- Genre: Young adult fiction

Kathryn Lance (November 26, 1943 – January 29, 2022) was an American writer in many fields of fiction and non-fiction under her own name and various pseudonyms, as well as being the ghostwriter for numerous books purportedly written by other people. She had written dozens of young adult novels in the science-fiction, mystery, and horror genres, many of them in series as by Lynn Beach. She had also written magazine articles and stories for both adults and children. Her topics included diet, sports, fitness, sexuality, and biotechnology, in both corporate publications and such national periodicals as Family Circle, Parade, Self, Town & Country, Ladies Home Journal, and Writer's Digest.

== Biography ==
Kathryn Lance was born in November 26, 1943, in El Paso, Texas. After growing up in Tucson, Arizona, Lance received degrees from the University of Arizona, including a master's in Russian. Moving to New York City in 1970, she initially wrote hundreds of scripts for the television soap operas Another World, Somerset, All My Children, and One Life to Live through 1973, then worked for Scholastic Magazines as associate editor until 1976. While there, she created and wrote The Halls of Haywood High, a successful teenage soap opera published biweekly in Senior Scholastic Magazine. In 1976 she published her first book, Running for Health and Beauty, which sold 500,000 copies in all editions. The first mass-market book about running, it is considered to have helped start the fitness boom.

She then turned to freelancing full-time, writing dozens of books, both fiction and nonfiction. Her first science-fiction novel for adults, Pandora’s Genes, was named to the Locus magazine Recommended list for 1986 and was chosen Best New Science Fiction of 1985 by Romantic Times.

Lance returned to Tucson in 1989, where she lived with her husband and four cats. In addition to writing, she had also taught novel-writing and other writing courses. Semi-retired in 2009, she wrote fiction and was a docent at Tohono Chul Park, leading nature walks. She was also a member of the Science Fiction Writers of America and the Authors Guild, and previously a board member of the American Society of Journalists and Authors.

== Bibliography ==
=== Adult nonfiction books ===
- Running for Health and Beauty. Bobbs-Merrill, 1977; Bantam, 1978.
- Getting Strong. Bobbs-Merrill, 1978; Bantam, 1979. First mass-market book on weight training for women. More than 150,000 sold.
- A Woman's Guide to Spectator Sports. A & W, 1980. Alternate selection of Book of the Month Club.
- Total Sexual Fitness for Women, in collaboration with Maria Agardy. Rawson, Wade, 1981.
- Sportsbeauty. Avon, 1984.
- The Setpoint Diet, as by Dr. Gilbert Leveille (ghostwritten). Ballantine, 1985. New York Times Sunday paperback best-seller list for six weeks; over 400,000 printed.
- Low-Impact Aerobics, Crown, 1988.
- The Princeton Plan, as by Edwin Heleniak, M.D. and Barbara Aston, M.S. (ghostwritten). St. Martins, 1990.
- The Body Code, by Jay Cooper with Kathryn Lance. Pocket, 1999. Alternate Selection of Book of the Month Club.
- The Botox Book, by Everett M. Lautin, M.D., and Suzanne M. Levine, D.P.M., and Kathryn Lance. M. Evans, 2002.
- You Don’t Need Plastic Surgery, by Everett M. Lautin, M.D., and Suzanne M. Levine, D.P.M. and Kathryn Lance, M. Evans, 2003.
- Heart and Soul: A Psychological and Spiritual Guide to Preventing and Healing Heart Disease, as by Bruno Cortis, M.D., (ghostwritten). Villard, 1995; Pocket, 1996.
- Unlocking the Animal Mind, by Franklin D. McMillan, D.V.M., with Kathryn Lance. Rodale, 2004.

=== Adult fiction ===
- "Barbara Ann,” short story based on her sister’s death, in Story: Yearbook of Discovery, 1968.
- "Welcome to Valhalla," short story by Kathryn Lance and Jack McDevitt, Asimov’s Science Fiction, December, 2008.
  - Anthologized in Cryptic: The Best Short Fiction of Jack McDevitt, Subterranean Press, 2009.
- Pandora's Genes. Questar, 1985. Winner, Best New Science Fiction Novel 1985, Romantic Times; Locus magazine Recommended List, 1986.
  - Smashwords and Kindle editions, 2011.
- Pandora's Children. Questar, 1986.
  - Smashwords and Kindle editions, 2011.
- The Ptorrigan Lode, novella, Smashwords and Kindle, 2011.

=== Young Adult and/or juvenile nonfiction ===
- As written by Lynn Beach: Dozens of articles and booklets on science, health, nutrition, consumerism, technology, space exploration, lifestyles, in national and regional publications.

=== Young Adult and/or juvenile fiction ===
- Going to See Grassy Ella, Lothrop, Lee & Shepard, May, 1993. Named Recommended Book for Reluctant Young Readers 1994 by Young Adult Library Services Association of the American Library Association
  - German edition 1995.
  - Smashwords and Kindle editions, 2011.

==== As written by Lynn Beach ====
- "Phantom Valley", a Young Adult paranormal mystery series comprising
  - The Evil One, Minstrel Books (Pocket), NYC, 1991
  - The Dark, Minstrel Books (Pocket), NYC, 1991
  - Scream of the Cat, Minstrel Books (Pocket), NYC, 1992
  - Stranger in the Mirror, Minstrel Books (Pocket), NYC, 1992
  - The Spell, Minstrel Books (Pocket), NYC, 1992
  - The Headless Ghost, Minstrel Books (Pocket), NYC, 1992
  - Dead Man’s Secret, Minstrel Books (Pocket), NYC, 1992
  - In the Mummy’s Tomb, Minstrel Books (Pocket), NYC, 1992
  - Curse of the Claw, Minstrel Books (Pocket), NYC, 1993

==== Others, under various names ====
- Seven books in the "Give Yourself Goosebumps" series, Scholastic, 1995—1999
- Twelve ghost-written Young Adult series novels for a single publisher, 1990–98
- Night of the Werecat, in the "R.L. Stine's Ghosts of Fear Street" series, Minstrel Books (Pocket), 1997 and 1998.
- Caution: Aliens at Work, in the "R.L. Stine's Ghosts of Fear Street" series, Minstrel Books (Pocket), 1997 and 1998.
- Secrets of the Lost Island, Scholastic, NYC, 1985
- The Haunted Castle of Ravencurse, Avon, NYC, 1985
- Attack of the Insecticons, Ballantine, NYC, 1985
- Conquest of the Time Master, Avon, NYC, 1986
- Invasion from Darkland, Avon, NYC, 1986
- Operation Jungle Doom, Random House, NYC, 1987
- Operation Time Machine, Random House, NYC, 1987
- Invisibility Island, Parachute Press, NYC, 1988
