= Fingers at the Window =

1942 film by Charles Lederer

- Directed by: Charles Lederer
- Screenplay by: Rose Caylor; Lawrence Bachmann
- Story by: Rose Caylor
- Produced by: Irving Starr
- Starring: Lew Ayres; Laraine Day; Basil Rathbone
- Cinematography: Charles Lawton Jr. Harry Stradling Sr.
- Edited by: George Boemler
- Music by: Bronislau Kaper
- Production company: Metro-Goldwyn-Mayer
- Distributed by: Metro-Goldwyn-Mayer
- Release date: 22 April 1942
- Running time: 80 minutes
- Country: United States
- Language: English
- Budget: $320,000
- Box office: $548,000

Fingers at the Window is a 1942 mystery film directed by Charles Lederer and released by Metro-Goldwyn-Mayer.

== Plot ==
An axe murderer in Chicago has killed six victims. The police, led by Inspector Gallagher, have arrested a different man for each crime. All are impervious to interrogation, and all are diagnosed by the county psychiatrist, Dr. Cromwall, as being in a state of paranoid schizophrenia.

Walking home late one night, Edwina Brown is about to become the seventh victim when Oliver Duffy intervenes and scares off her assailant.

Oliver, an unemployed actor, escorts Edwina home but fears the attacker will try again. His vigilance leads to the arrest of Fred Bixley, the proprietor of a bird shop. Bixley is as uncommunicative as the others.

The police put Edwina in a hotel for the night. Oliver notices the fire axe has been removed from the hallway, and he chases a man down the stairs and outside, but loses him.

Oliver believes that Edwina is withholding information that would explain why she is being targeted. He is certain that behind the murders there is a mastermind whom Edwina somehow knows.

Inspector Gallagher observes that all of the murderers' surnames begin with B, but he is not interested in hearing about the axeman or in Oliver's mastermind theory. The prisoner Bixley reacts oddly when he sees Edwina with Dr. Cromwall—he flings a handful of unintelligible scribbled notes at her. She gives one to Oliver as a souvenir, and when he realizes that it is mirror writing, he reads, "Help Fred Bixley Ridgely Clinic."

To investigate the Ridgely Clinic, Oliver gains entry by posing as a psychopath. He discovers that the murderers have been drawn from a file of discharged incurables, and concludes they were selected by a psychiatrist who incited them to murder.

Oliver escapes from the clinic and takes Edwina to a meeting of the Psychiatric Society. She does not recognize any of the doctors, but Dr. Santelle is absent so they visit his home. Santelle avoids meeting them by having his assistant take his place, and follows them to the L train, where he pushes Oliver onto the track before disappearing into the crowd.

Oliver survives but requires hospitalization. Edwina tells him what she has been holding back: she was engaged while living in Paris but her fiancé, Caesar Ferrari, disappeared.

While Oliver rests, Edwina is waiting in another room when she sees Caesar Ferrari walk by. A nurse insists that it was Dr. Santelle, who returned from Paris a few months ago. Edwina follows him, unaware that he has injected Oliver with a deadly dose of insulin. Oliver is saved by alert medical staff and telephones the police because he has figured out that Dr. Santelle is the mastermind of the murders. But Dr. Immelman, the director of the Ridgely Clinic, was taken in by Oliver's performance there and has convinced the police that Oliver is a psychopath and responsible for the murders.

Edwina follows Caesar to his house. He reveals that he is impersonating his former employer Dr. Santelle in order to steal the fortune that the man inherited shortly before dying in Paris. Santelle worked in Europe for thirty years and nobody in Chicago knows what he looked like. The six axe murder victims were people who knew Caesar in Paris. Edwina is the last person in Chicago who can identify Caesar as an impostor.

Edwina tries to escape but Caesar knocks her out and hides her in a closet as the police arrive, looking for Oliver. Believing him to be a homicidal maniac, they arrest Oliver when he shows up, and ignore his accusations against Dr. Santelle. But when Dr. Cromwall notices one of Bixley's notes—that could only have been left by Edwina—he wants to search the house. Caesar/Santelle panics and tries to flee but is shot dead.

Oliver finds Edwina and they intend to get married immediately.

== Cast ==
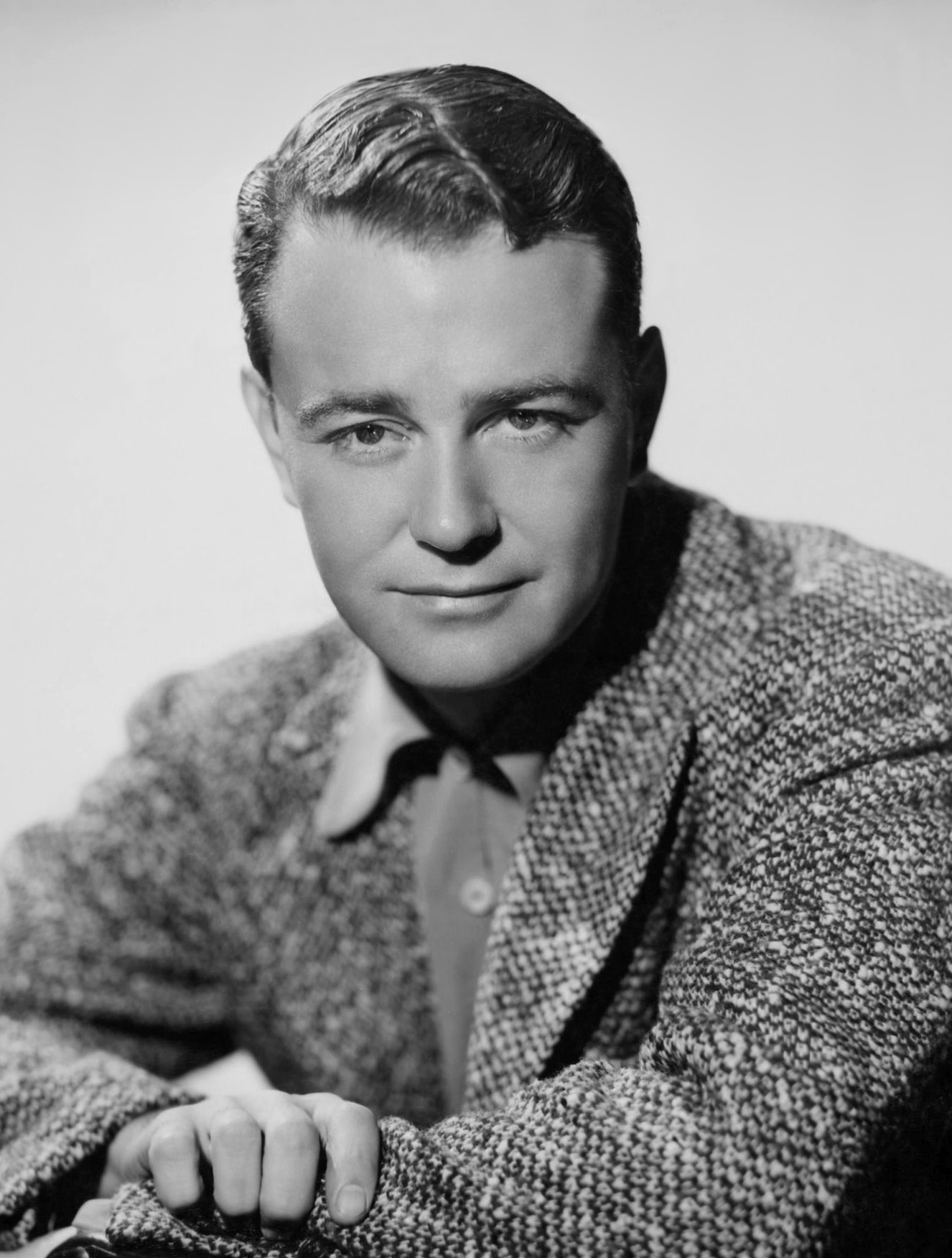
Lew Ayres plays Oliver Duffy, who protects Edwina from would-be assassins.

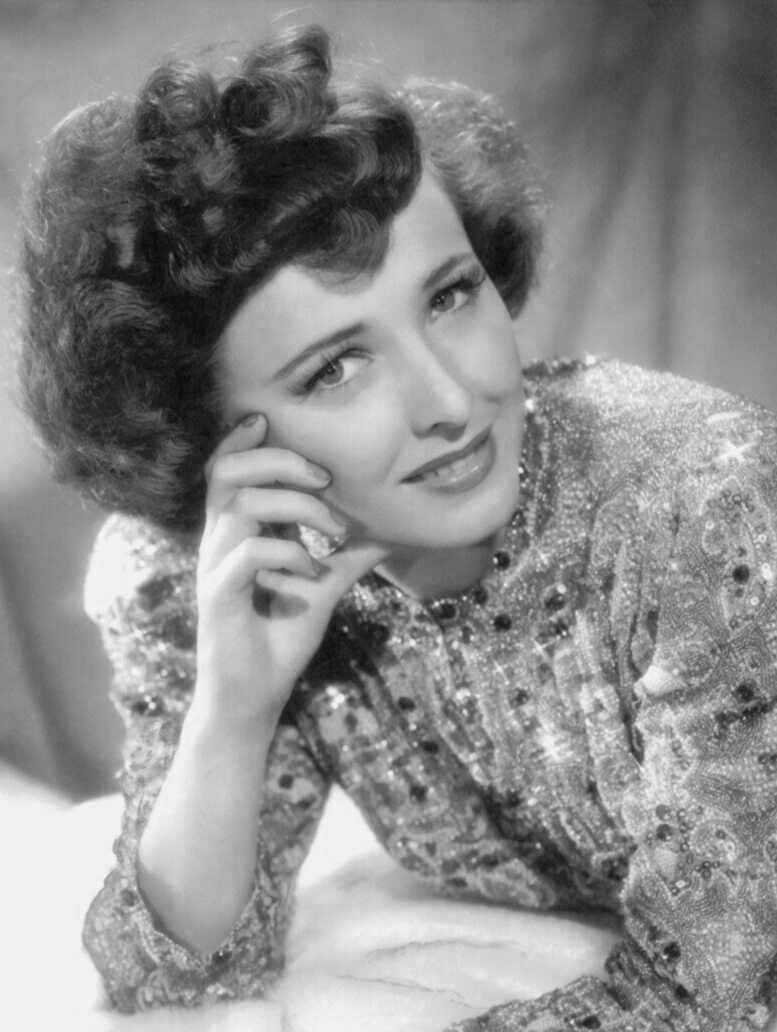
Laraine Day plays Edwina Brown, target of a determined killer.

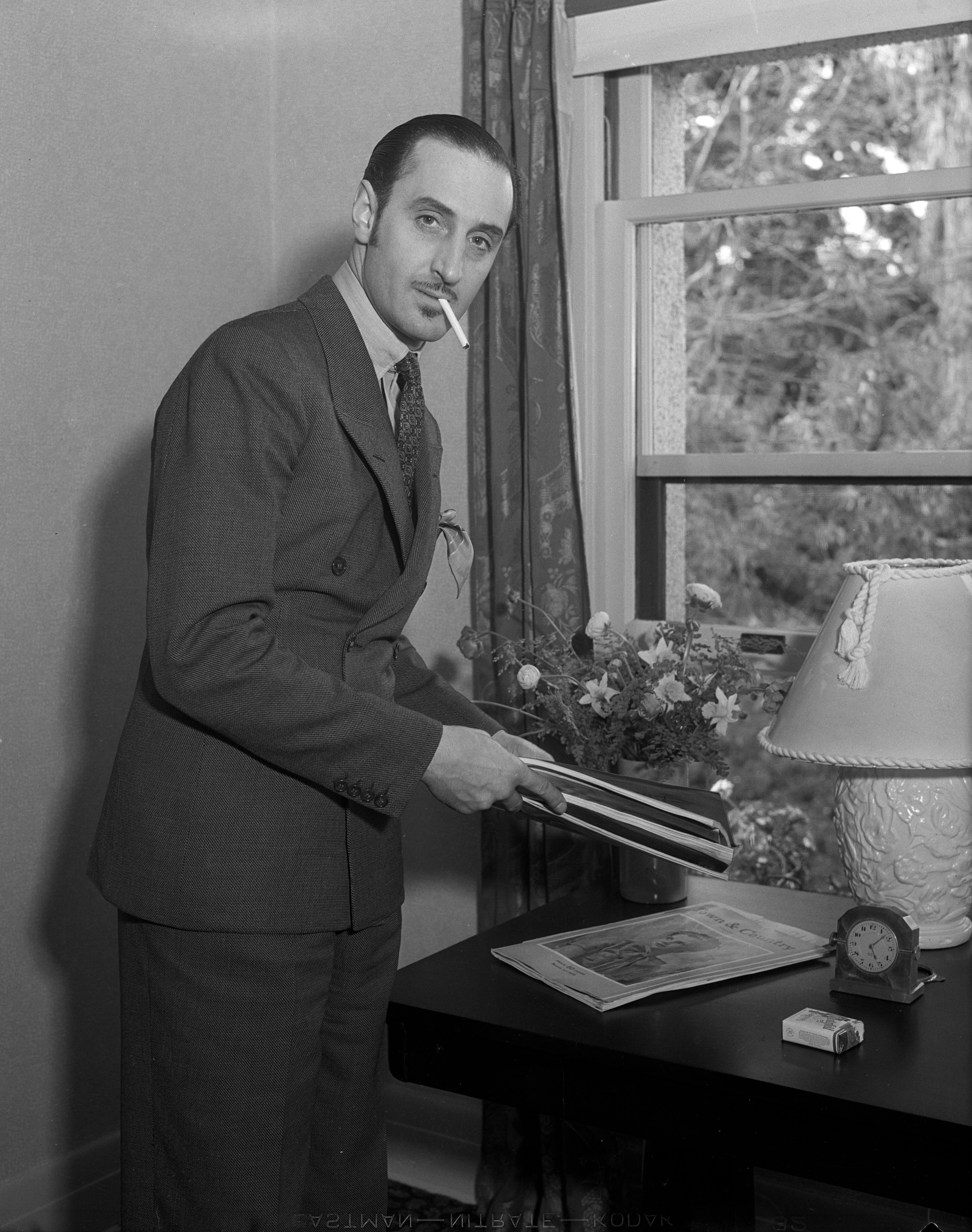
Basil Rathbone plays Dr. Santelle/Caesar who intends to kill anyone who knows his true identity.

- Lew Ayres as Oliver Duffy
- Laraine Day as Edwina Brown
- Basil Rathbone as Dr. H. Santelle
- Walter Kingsford as Dr. Cromwall
- Miles Mander as Dr. Kurt Immelman
- Charles D. Brown as Inspector Gallagher
- Cliff Clark as Lt. Allison
- James Flavin as Lt. Schaeffer
- Russell Gleason as Ogilvie
- William Tannen as Devlan
- Mark Daniels as Haguey
- Bert Roach as Krum
- Russell Hicks as Dr. Chandley
- Charles Wagenheim as Fred Bixley, the birdman
- Robert Homans as Officer O'Garrity
- Byron Foulger as hotel axeman (uncredited)

== Reception ==
=== Box office ===
The film made $288,000 in the US and Canada and $260,000 elsewhere, making a profit of $29,000.

=== Critical ===
The New York Times wrote, "this intended 'chiller' is decidedly soft and lukewarm," whereas Leonard Maltin called it an "Entertaining mystery".

Leslie Halliwell, in the 7th. Edition of his famous Film Guide, mistakenly mis-described Basil Rathbone's character as a "Stage magician" who "Hypnotises lunatics". He called it "Slow- starting"; a film which "Never achieves top gear", on page 347.
