= Rose Caylor =

American screenwriter and playwright

- Born: Rose Libman; 15 March 1898; Vilna, Russian Empire
- Died: March 1979 (aged 80–81); Nyack, New York, U.S.
- Education: The University of Chicago
- Occupation(s): Screenwriter, playwright, journalist, actress
- Spouse: Ben Hecht (m. 1925; died 1964)
- Children: Jenny Hecht

Rose Caylor (born Rose Libman, 15 March 1898 – March 1979) was a Russian-American screenwriter, playwright, actress, and journalist known for her work in the U.S. in the 1920s through the 1940s. She was married to filmmaker and journalist Ben Hecht.

== Biography ==
Rose was born into a Jewish family in Vilna, in what was then the Russian Empire. Her father, Morris Libman, emigrated to the U.S. in 1907, and Rose and her mother and sister followed the next year, settling in Chicago, Illinois.

Rose attended the University of Chicago and afterward began working at The Chicago Daily News, where she met her future husband, writer Ben Hecht. The pair moved to New York together in 1924, and married in 1925 after his divorce from his first wife was finalized. They had one daughter, actress Jenny Hecht.

Over the course of her career as a writer, she wrote a number of original stage plays and novels; she also authored the 1942 film noir Fingers at the Window. She appears to have worked on several films with her husband that she didn't receive credits on. She also translated plays from Russian into English for Broadway productions. During World War II, she went to work on the assembly line at an aviation plant.

Ben Hecht died in 1964, and Jenny Hecht died of an accidental drug overdose in 1971. Rose was living in Nyack, New York, where she died in March 1979.

== Selected works ==
Screenplays:

- Fingers at the Window (1942)
- Once in a Blue Moon (1936) (uncredited)
- Spring Tonic (1935) (uncredited)

Stage plays:

- Man-Eating Tiger
- All He Ever Loved
- Lentil

Novels:

- The Journey
- The Balcony
