= A Warrior's Journey =

2003 fantasy novel

- Cover of the first edition
- Author: Paul B. Thompson, Tonya C. Cook
- Language: English
- Series: Ergoth trilogy
- Genre: Fantasy novel
- Publication date: 2003
- Publication place: United States
- Media type: Print
- ISBN: 0-7869-2965-0

A Warrior's Journey is a fantasy novel by Paul B. Thompson and Tonya C. Cook, set in the world of Dragonlance, and based on the Dungeons & Dragons role-playing game. It is the first novel in the "Ergoth" trilogy. It was published in paperback in May 2003.

== Plot summary ==
A Warrior's Journey is a novel in which a young peasant boy deals with the chaos caused by the struggle between two rival empires.

== Reception ==
Critic Don D'Ammassa wrote that despite there being "nothing out of the ordinary", A Warrior's Journey is "a good story and won't disappoint most readers."
