= Spring Tonic =

1935 film by Clyde Bruckman

- Directed by: Clyde Bruckman
- Screenplay by: H.W. Hanemann; Patterson McNutt; Howard Irving Young
- Based on: The Man-Eating Tiger, a 1927 play by Ben Hecht and Rose Caylor
- Produced by: Robert Kane
- Starring: Lew Ayres; Claire Trevor; Walter Woolf King; Jack Haley; ZaSu Pitts; Tala Birell
- Cinematography: L. William O'Connell
- Production company: Fox Film Corporation
- Distributed by: Fox Film Corporation
- Release date: April 19, 1935
- Running time: 58 minutes
- Country: United States
- Language: English

Spring Tonic is a 1935 American comedy film adapted from the 1927 play The Man-Eating Tiger by Ben Hecht and Rose Caylor. It was directed by Clyde Bruckman and stars Lew Ayres, Claire Trevor, Walter Woolf King, Jack Haley, ZaSu Pitts and Tala Birell. It was released on April 19, 1935, by Fox Film Corporation.

== Cast ==
- Lew Ayres as Caleb Enix
- Claire Trevor as Bertha 'Betty' Ingals
- Walter Woolf King as José
- Jack Haley as Sykes
- ZaSu Pitts as Maggie Conklin
- Tala Birell as Lola
- Sig Ruman as Matt Conklin
- Frank Mitchell as Griffin Nasher
- Jack Durant as Cambridge Nasher
- Herbert Mundin as Thompson
- Henry Kolker as Mr. Enix
- Laura Treadwell as Mrs. Enix
- Douglas Wood as Mr. Ingalls
- Helen Freeman as Mrs. Ingalls
- George Chandler as Taxi Driver
