= The Dargonesti =

1995 novel by Paul B. Thompson and Tonya C. Cook

- First edition cover
- Author: Paul B. Thompson & Tonya C. Cook
- Cover artist: Larry Elmore
- Language: English
- Series: Lost Histories, Dragonlance
- Genre: Fantasy novel
- Publisher: Wizards of the Coast
- Publication date: October 1995
- Publication place: United States
- Media type: Print (Paperback)
- Pages: 303 pp
- ISBN: 0-7869-0182-9
- OCLC: 59625520
- Preceded by: The Irda
- Followed by: Land of the Minotaurs

The Dargonesti is a fantasy novel set in the Dragonlance campaign series and is part of the Lost Histories.

== Plot introduction ==
The Dargonesti is set in the underwater city of Urione, of the Dargonesti.

== Plot summary ==
The book begins with a Qualinesti princess, Vixa, and some forces sent on the Evenstar to rescue an elven ambassador escaping from the advancing Ergothian army. A white wall of fog appears, and tows their ship away for an entire night. The fog clears to reveal a sandy island, which they learn is nine hundred leagues away from their previous location. The island is also unlisted on any maps. They explore the island, and see figures that wear green enamel armor and braided eelweed, who attempt to kidnap one of the exploration party. The exploration party attacks the figures, at which point the figures run away. They follow them into a cave, which collapses as soon as they are in it. While in the cave, they realize they landed on a kraken, and went into its blowhole. They cause the kraken so much pain that it to releases them while underwater. Unable to swim, they begin to drown.

Luckily they are rescued by Dargonesti elves, known as the green enameled figures. The four that survived are taken to a hollow volcano on the outskirts of Urione, a Dargonesti city, which is full of air and houses other captives. They meet Garnath and others there, and learn that the Dargonesti forces them to build walls to help defend against the chilkit, gigantic lobsters that are the enemies of the Dargonesti. Vixa meets Coryphene, as well as the Queen of the Dargonesti in Urione, Uriona. Vixa is told by Coryphene never to look at the queen, and to be obedient. She learns that Uriona wants to become rule of the Silvanesti, and appears mad. She chafes at being obedient, so she tries to catch a glimpse of Uriona. She sees Uriona reflected by the floor, and then Uriona's green eyes flash, causing her to become unconscious. As a punishment for being disobedient, she is sent to the volcano. While building a wall, the foursome are attacked by the chilkit. They are forced to fight with nothing but their bare hands, and fortunately they survive. However, many others didn't. After working for a while, one morning the Dargonesti don't arrive to escort them to work, and they can soon hear there is fighting going on outside. The dwarves had stored many jars of gnomefire, otherwise known as Greek fire, which was made from the minerals inside the volcano. Chilkit begin to enter the volcano, and the water level also begins to rise. The captives use the gnomefire on the chilkit. However, one manages to corner Vixa, but she is luckily saved by Garnath. Unfortunately, Garnath is killed while saving her. The water level is now very high, and the gnomefire used up the remaining oxygen in the volcano, so the captives are forced to swim out of the volcano, but they have no air shells to breathe through, and Vixa becomes unconscious after swimming outside.

She is rescued by Naxos, who takes her to the surface. However, they cannot get back to Urione, because they have no air shells, and Vixa can't hold her breath for that long. Naxos decides to make her one of the sea brothers, allowing her to shape change into a dolphin at will. They swim back to Urione, however she conceals her ability so that Naxos won't get into trouble. She meets up with the rest of the captives in a barracks where they are held. Gundabyr agrees to show the Dargonesti how to use gnomefire so that they can destroy the chilkit, in exchange for freedom. However, Uriona secretly tells Coryphene that the captives must not be allowed to live. Since the captives are now heroes for saving the city from the chilkit, captives are showered with gifts, and can leave the barracks. However, none come back. Vixa soon realizes that the soldiers under Coryphene's orders are killing captives, so she decides to escape. Gundabyr is held prisoner in a guard room, so Vixa rescues him, then Vixa as a dolphin carries Gundabyr on her back, heading for Silvanesti. They attempt to warn the Silvanesti of an attack, but are considered mad and are held captive in an outlying fort. When the Dargonesti do come to attack the fort, the general sets them free to help fight. However, the Dargonesti brought a kraken, which quickly levels the fort. The two manage to escape and reach Silvanost to warn the Speaker of the Stars, Elendar.

With the help of Vixa and Gundabyr, the Silvanesti manage to defeat the Dargonesti, and hold Uriona, Coryphene and other Dargonesti elves captive. Elendar decides to marry Uriona, however, their sons will not be in line for the throne. Vixa tells Coryphene that Uriona is going to marry Elendar, and so Coryphene commits suicide, because he loved Uriona passionately, so followed all of her wishes and commands. However, Uriona always thought of him as a tool to help her achieve her dreams. Vixa and Gundabyr are given a griffin to ride to Thorbardin, where she drops Gundabyr off. Then, she rides back to Qualinesti, and is joyfully received by her parents, who thought her dead. They hold a feast in her honor, and her story is spread throughout the realm. Since their daughter can carry responsibility now, she is given command of the Wildrunners. She begins to feel a calling to return to the sea, so days later she abandons her post, writes a letter to her parents saying good bye, and goes to live underwater as Naxos's wife.

== Characters ==
- Vixa Ambrodel - A warrior princess of Qualinost.
- Garnath - A dwarf, also held captive by the Dargonesti.
- Gundabyr - Garnath's twin, also held captive.
- Coryphene - Protector of the city of Urione.
- Naxos - The leader of the sea brothers, who can turn into dolphins and help guard Urione.

== Reception ==
Jonathan Palmer reviewed The Dargonesti for Arcane magazine, rating it a 6 out of 10 overall. He cautioned that, "As a piece of literature, this hardly deserves your time", but felt that for players of Dungeons & Dragons he recommended that "there are numerous creatures and concepts of interest".
