= Rose Estes =

American novelist

Rose Estes is the author of many fantasy and science fiction books, including full-length novels and multiple choice gamebooks.

== Early life ==
Rose Estes began reading at the age of two, and as a child she was already imagining fantastic places. Before becoming a writer, she "put in time as a hippie, a student, a newspaper reporter, and an advertising copy writer." She has traveled extensively throughout the Americas. She has four children.

== Career ==
As an employee of Tactical Studies Rules (TSR), Rose Estes thought of the idea for the Endless Quest gamebook product line, and wrote the first four books in the series, starting with Dungeon of Dread (1982). The first four Endless Quest books, all released in January 1982, were on the Best Seller list for more than six months. TSR considered Endless Quest merely a fad, and moved to diversify the mainstream publishing it had begun; Estes and James M. Ward formed an education department for the company, but this failed because TSR did not hire any educational sales staff. Estes continued to contribute to Endless Quest, writing five additional books in the series through 1983. She wrote her first full-length novel, Children of the Dragon, in 1985.

After Gary Gygax left TSR, Estes wrote new novels in the "Greyhawk Adventures" series, beginning with Master Wolf (1987) and finishing with The Eyes Have It (1989). She continued to write for TSR by writing six volumes in a series of Greyhawk novels.

She contributed to other series, but continued to write books and start series of her own that, like Children of the Dragon, take place in a fantasy or science fiction world created by her own imagination. She also wrote the Golden Book Music Video Sing, Giggle and Grin.

In February 2026, Estes released a new interactive, Endless Quest-style novel, entitled Into Shadows Deep, published by Savage Realms Gamebooks / Savage Realms Press. It is the first book in her new interactive fiction series called Different: The Quest Continues.

== Books ==
=== Endless Quest ===
Books in the Endless Quest series:

- Dungeon of Dread (Endless Quest Book 1) (1982)
- Mountain of Mirrors (Endless Quest Book 2) (1982)
- Pillars of Pentegarn (Endless Quest Book 3) (1983)
- Return to Brookmere (Endless Quest Book 4) (1982)
- Revolt of the Dwarves (Endless Quest Book 5) (1983)
- Revenge of the Rainbow Dragons (Endless Quest Book 6) (1983)
- Hero of Washington Square (Endless Quest Book 7) (1983)
- Circus of Fear (Endless Quest Book 10)(1983)
- Dragon of Doom (Endless Quest Book 13) (1983)

Mountain of Mirrors was converted into an adventure for the computer game Neverwinter Nights.

=== Find Your Fate ===
The Find Your Fate series licensed famous media franchises:

- Indiana Jones and the Lost Treasure of Sheeba (1984)
- The Three Investigators — The Case of the Dancing Dinosaur (1985)
- The Trail of Death (1985)
- The Mystery of the Turkish Tattoo (1986)

=== Greyhawk Adventures ===
- Master Wolf (Greyhawk Adventures, Vol. 3) (1987)
- The Price of Power (Greyhawk Adventures, Vol. 4) (1987)
- The Demon Hand (Greyhawk Adventures, Vol. 5) (1988)
- The Name of the Game (Greyhawk Adventures, Vol. 6) (1988)
- Dragon in Amber (Greyhawk Adventure Series Vol. 7) (1988)
- The Eyes Have It (A Greyhawk Adventures Series Vol. 8) (1989)

Her novel The Eyes Have It uses the same cover artwork (a Keith Parkinson painting) as the first Endless Quest Crimson Crystal Adventures gamebook, Riddle of the Griffon by Susan Lawson. In most instances, The Eyes Have It is given no volume number. It is not directly identified as part of the Greyhawk Adventures series on most websites, nor in official Dungeons and Dragons publications.

=== Hunter ===
- The Hunter (1990)
- The Hunter: On Arena (1991)
- The Hunter: Victorious (1992)

=== Katherine Sinclair ===
- Troll Quest (1995)
- Troll Taken (1993)

=== Rune Sword Series ===
- Skryling's Blade (Rune Sword, No. 2) (1990) (with Tom Wham)
- The Stone of Time (Rune Sword, No. 6) (1992)

=== Saga of the Lost Lands ===
- Saga of the Lost Lands: Blood of the Tiger (Vol. 1) (1987)
- Saga of the Lost Lands: Brother to the Lion (Vol. 2) (1988)
- Saga of the Lost Lands: Spirit of the Hawk (Vol. 3) (1988)

=== Different: The Quest Continues ===
- Into Shadows Deep (2026)

=== Other books ===
- Children of the Dragon (1985)
- Elfwood (1992)
- Iron Dragons: Mountains and Madness (1993)
- The Case of the Dancing Dinosaur (1985)
- The Chow Chow Club, Inc. Celebrates 100 Years: 1906-2006 (2006)
- The West Highland White Terrier. Its History Through Word, Art and Vintage Photographs
- Vintage Photos of Terriers (2006)
