= Fire Brats =

Children's book series

Fire Brats is a series of children's books about two teenagers, Matt and Dani, who both survive post apocalyptic World War III. The books were written by Barbara Siegel, Scott Siegel and Barbara Steiner. The first book, The Burning Land, was published in 1987.

== Overview ==
Fire Brats is a series set in the aftermath of World War III. It follows the struggles of two teenagers, Matt and Dani, to escape a nuclear-bombed city and find a new life.

=== The Burning Land (1987) ===
Matt and Dani scarcely know one another when World War III happens. They meet each other in a theater basement, where they live on junk food and suffer a mild form of radiation sickness. When an earthquake destroys the building over their heads a month later, they dig their way out to find themselves threatened by a gang of escaped convicts. They escape to head for California, where Matt hopes to find the rest of his family still alive.

=== Survivors (1987) ===
Matt and Dani cross a huge river on a raft, and are taken in by a kindly old survivalist who teaches them various useful techniques and helps them destroy a pack of bandits.

=== Thunder Mountain (1987) ===
As a dust storm strikes, Matt and Dani struggle to survive. They eventually reach the shelter of Thunder Mountain, but it is not really the safe refuge they need.

=== Shockwave (1988) ===
As nuclear autumn persists, Matt and Dani foil a band of slave-trading bikers and save Denver from flooding caused by a lake which was formed by the bombing.

== Reception ==
One of the issues that has irked many readers of this series was that there was never any resolution. The first four books build up the characters, who are trying to get to California, have these characters face much adversity, and then leave them stranded with book four. The reason for there not being any fifth book is still unknown.

This series of books was very popular amongst adolescent readers, many of whom remember the series fondly, but still, all this time later, long to know the fate of Matt and Dani.
