= Paul B. Thompson (novelist) =

American novelist

Paul B. Thompson (born 1958) is a freelance writer and novelist. He has published twenty-nine books to date, many of which are novels set in the Dragonlance fictional universe. A number of these novels are co-authored with Tonya C. Cook.

== Career ==
Paul grew up in North Carolina, and was influenced by Greek mythology, The Arabian Nights, and writers such as L. Sprague de Camp, Alfred Bester, and Cordwainer Smith.

He graduated from the University of North Carolina in 1980 with a degree in history. While at UNC he met Tonya Cook through the student science fiction club, Chimera. He received his master's degree in 1983. In the period 1980–84 he wrote magazine articles and historical novels. When he found no market for historical novels he turned to fantasy and science fiction. He also began collaborating with Tonya Cook at that time.

From 1990 to 1994 he published Forbidden Lines, a semi-pro magazine of science fiction, horror, and speculative fiction.

Paul lives in Chapel Hill, North Carolina with his wife Elizabeth.

== Works ==
Books

- Sundipper, St. Martin's Press, 1987.
- Red Sands, TSR, 1988.
- Darkness and Light, TSR, 1989.
- Riverwind the Plainsman, TSR, 1990.
- Firstborn, TSR, 1991.
- The Qualinesti, TSR, 1991.
- Thorn and Needle, TSR, 1992.
- The Dargonesti, TSR, 1995.
- Nemesis, Wizards of the Coast, 2000.
- Bertrem's Guide to the Age of Mortals,(with Nancy Berberick & Stan Brown) - (WotC), 2000.
- Children of the Plains, Wizards of the Coast (WotC), 2000.
- Brother of the Dragon, WotC, 2001.
- Sister of the Sword, WotC, 2002.
- A Warrior's Journey, WotC, 2003.
- The Middle of Nowhere, WotC, 2003.
- The Wizard's Fate, WotC, 2004.
- A Hero's Justice, WotC, 2004.
- Sanctuary, WotC, 2005.
- Alliances, WotC, 2006.
- Destiny, WotC, 2007.
- Joan of Arc Warrior Saint of France, Enslow Publications, 2007.
- The Forest King, Wizards of the Coast, 2009.
- Liberty's Son (The Boston Tea Party) Enslow, 2009.
- Billy the Kid: It Was a Game of Two, Enslow, 2010.
- The Devil's Door, (The Salem Witchcraft Trials) Enslow, 2010.
- The Brightworking, Enslow, 2012.
- The Fortune Teller, Enslow, 2012.
- Battle for the Brightstone, Enslow, 2013.
- Lost Republic, Scarlet Voyage, 2014.

Plays

- "Forget-Me-Not," (with Tonya Carter Cook), 1987.

Television:

- Commentary for "Scary Tales" (Workaholic Productions), 3Net

cable network, 4 episodes (October–December 2011).

- Marked by the Mob, 3 episodes, 3Net cable network, January 2013.
- America: Facts Vs. Fiction, episode The New World, The Military Channel, August 2013.
- America: Facts Vs. Fiction, episode The Real West, American Heroes Channel, January 2017.
