= Angels Over Broadway =

1940 film by Ben Hecht, Lee Garmes

- Theatrical release poster
- Directed by: Ben Hecht; Lee Garmes (co-director)
- Written by: Ben Hecht
- Produced by: Ben Hecht; Douglas Fairbanks Jr. (assoc. producer)
- Starring: Douglas Fairbanks Jr. Rita Hayworth; Thomas Mitchell
- Cinematography: Lee Garmes
- Edited by: Gene Havlick
- Music by: George Antheil
- Production company: Columbia Pictures
- Distributed by: Columbia Pictures
- Release date: October 2, 1940
- Running time: 79 minutes
- Country: United States
- Language: English

Angels Over Broadway (also called Before I Die) is a 1940 American drama film noir starring Douglas Fairbanks Jr., Rita Hayworth, Thomas Mitchell and John Qualen. Ben Hecht, who co-directed (with cinematographer Lee Garmes), co-produced and wrote the screenplay, was nominated for an Oscar for Best Original Screenplay. It was produced and distributed by Columbia Pictures.

Fairbanks Jr. co-produced, helping persuade Harry Cohn of Columbia to finance. Cohn gave them Rita Hayworth, in her first leading role in an "A" picture. "Cohn couldn't figure out what the picture was about but neither could we," said Fairbanks Jr.

== Plot ==
Bill O'Brien is a New York con man in search of his next gullible victim. In a fancy nightclub, he finds Charles Engle, a guilt-ridden man on the brink of committing suicide after embezzling a large sum of money that he has spent on his high-maintenance wife. Charles seems like an unsophisticated out-of-towner visiting the city and Bill decides to try for his money. Bill is unaware that the desperate Charles only has until 6 AM to pay back the money before the crime is discovered.

One of the showgirls at the club, Nina Barona, is persuaded by Bill to help trick Charles into entering a poker game to win back the money. The game is arranged by a gangster named Dutch Enright. Another disillusioned man at the club, playwright Gene Gibbons, learns about Charles's misfortune from the suicide note he discovers in his coat, and wants to write the man a story with a happier ending. He tries to get a valuable brooch from his ex-girlfriend, to give to Charles so that he can get the money, but his plan fails because the brooch is a cheap copy. Instead he overhears Bill telling of his poker scam against Charles, and persuades Bill to change the plan so that Charles wins early and is allowed to escape from the game after that. A deal is made, that Bill gets whatever Charles wins over the $3,000 he needs. However, Gene passes out while waiting for the game to start, and when he wakes up he does not remember the deal he made and goes home to his wife. Bill discovers that Gene is gone, and Dutch finds out about Charles's planned escape and tries to stop him. Nina convinces Bill to do the right thing and help fend off Dutch's men when they try to get Charles and the money back.

Bill is changed by his discovery that behaving honorably has a positive effect on him; he falls in love with Nina, who returns his feelings.

== Cast ==
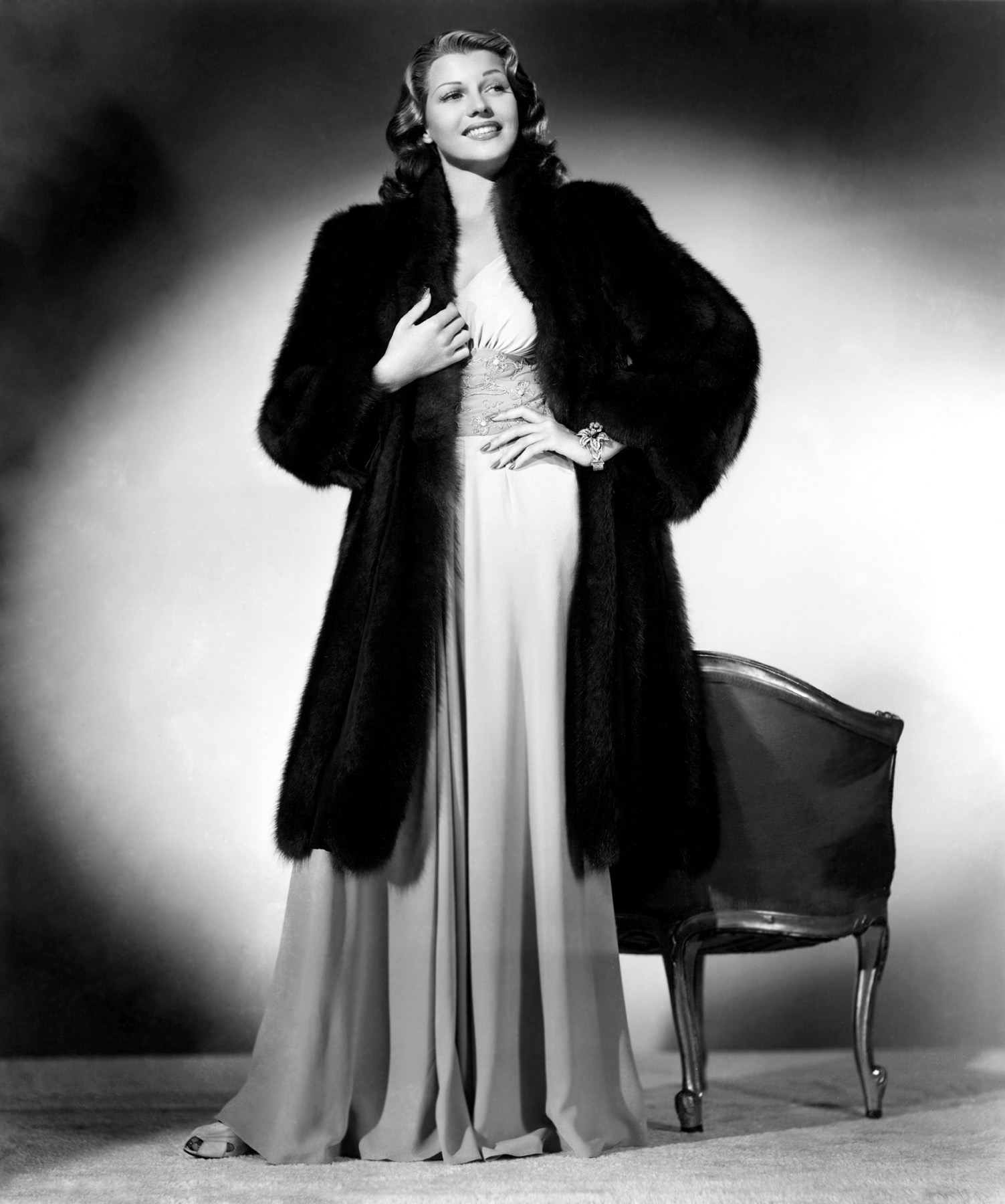
Rita Hayworth in Angels Over Broadway

- Douglas Fairbanks Jr. as Bill O'Brien
- Rita Hayworth as Nina Barona
- Thomas Mitchell as Gene Gibbons
- John Qualen as Charles Engle
- George Watts as Joseph Hopper
- Ralph Theodore as Dutch Enright
- Eddie Foster as Louie Artino
- Jack Roper as Eddie Burns
- Constance Worth as Sylvia Marbe

== Reception ==
On review aggregator website Rotten Tomatoes, the film holds an approval rating of 67%, based on 6 reviews, with an average rating of 6/10.

Time Out called the film "[a] characteristically slick (if moralizing) script by Hecht and fine camerawork from Garmes can't quite prevent tedium setting in as the excellent cast play a group of moral down-and-outs (embezzler, con-man, dancer, disillusioned playwright) who see the light and discover that life is worth living during a night's gambling in a New York café".

Variety praised the film as "synthetic tale of Broadway nightlife", adding that "[a]side from Thomas Mitchell, as a screwball playwright who sees a story in every individual, and who delights in plotting a finish, there's nothing much in the Hechtian tale".

Gil Jawetz of DVD Talk criticized the price for a film, since it was never restored for DVD viewing experience.
