= Firstborn (Thompson and Carter novel) =

1991 novel by Paul B. Thompson and Tonya R. Carter

Darkness and Light
- Cover of the first edition
- Author: Paul B. Thompson & Tonya R. Carter
- Language: English
- Series: Dragonlance: Elven Nations
- Genre: Fantasy novel
- Publisher: Wizards of the Coast
- Publication date: February 1991
- Publication place: United States
- Media type: Print (Paperback)
- ISBN: 1-56076-051-6
- Followed by: The Kinslayer Wars

Firstborn is a fantasy novel by Paul B. Thompson and Tonya R. Carter which is set in the world of the Dragonlance campaign setting and is the first volume in the Elven Nations series.

== Synopsis ==
Firstborn is a novel which takes place in the ancient elf city Silvanost, where Sithel rules all elves as Speaker of the Stars, and becomes a father to twin sons. A prophecy is made on that same night that "They both shall wear crowns" even though the Silvanesti can only have one ruler. The elder son Sithas is raised expecting to be heir to the throne, while the younger son Kith-Kanan is given the freedom of a second son. Sithas holds strong beliefs in favor of the purity of elven people and thus makes allies of the court aristocrats in Silvanost, while Kith-Kanan feels Silvanesti will require trade with outsiders to forge its future, such as the humans who live in Ergoth. When their father is killed during a hunt, Sithas takes over his position as Speaker of the Stars, while Kith-Kanan is required to swear fealty to him, while he questions the opposition Sithas has toward the humans.

== Plot summary ==
The leadership of the elves passes to Sithel, the son of the great and wise Silvanos, after the death of Silvanos. Sithel is a wise ruler, but his sons follow different paths; the elder twin, Sithas, follows the elven court while Kith-Kanan allies himself more with his Wildrunners and the humans of Ergoth.
