= Golden Girl and the Guardians of the Gemstones =

American toy line

Golden Girl and the Guardians of the Gemstones is a line of toys manufactured by Galoob in 1984-1985.

Galoob's toy line was focused on eleven 6" action figures with five points of articulation, bendable legs and rooted hair. The line consisted of five female heroes, Golden Girl, Saphire, Rubee, Onyx and Jade (The Guardians of the Gemstones) and four female villains, Dragon Queen, Vultura, Moth Lady and Wild One (The Forces of Evil). Additionally there were two male action figures included in the line, Prince Kroma (aligned with the heroines) and Ogra (aligned with the villains). Each figure included a cape, a comb, a diecast shield with a shiny gemstone embedded in it, a headpiece and a weapon.

An extensive fashion line was produced in conjunction with the action figure line. Three waves were released, and each wave contained an individual fashion for each of the nine female characters. Each wave had a specific theme: Evening Enchantment, a line of gowns; Festival Spirit, a line of shiny outfits; and Forest Fantasy, a line of rustic outfits.

Additional play elements were released including a castle playset for the heroines, The Palace of Gems. Golden Girl's unicorn Olympia, and Dragon Queen's steed Shadow were also produced. Both horses were available for purchase by themselves or in separate deluxe sets that included chariots (w/ the chariots matching each horse's color scheme). Four Dream Tents were produced for the action figures in limited numbers. A Collector's case to store the action figures was also released.

Galoob also licensed out play items separate from the action figure line including Find Your Own Fate books, activity books, storybooks, a sticker calendar, a stamp set, jigsaw puzzles and a board game. Additionally, a 3-D Colorforms playset was produced that included all 11 characters. The ethnicities of Vultura and Onyx were swapped in the Colorforms playset.

Non-playline items included a Golden Girl Halloween costume, a Thermos brand lunchbox, drinking cups and a sleeping bag. Wearable metallic brooches representing the five heroines (Golden Girl, Saphire, Rubee, Onyx and Jade) were also produced.

== Story ==
Golden Girl, Saphire, Rubee, Onyx and Jade are the Guardians of precious jewels called Gemstones, which make the Guardians strong and skillful so they can defend the Kingdom of Argonia from all enemies. One of these enemies, Dragon Queen, seeks to conquer Argonia with her band of evil warriors Vultura, Moth Lady and Wild One.

== Characters ==
=== The Guardians of the Gemstones ===
Each member of the Guardians of the Gemstones and Dragon Queen's Forces of Evil was produced in 6" action figure form. Each action figure had five points of articulation, including neck, shoulders, and hips as well as bendable legs. All figures had rooted hair, female and male, and included a comb. Accessories for each figure included a fabric cape, diecast metal shield, belt, weapon and headpiece. Each diecast shield has a shiny gemstone embedded in it representing the hero or villain it belonged to and could also be worn by the toy owner as a brooch.

- Golden Girl is the princess and the leader of the Gemstone Guardians. Golden Girl, along with her other Guardians, has a constant conflict with evil Dragon Queen. Even with the power from her Gemstone shield and the magical help from her steed, Olympia, she is always on guard against attack. Golden girl had a gold metallic two piece outfit. Her cape were gold and white and her boots and wrist gauntlets were gold. Golden Girl did not wear as much makeup as the other characters, and she only had gold earrings and pink lipstick. Golden Girl had golden blonde hair and a gold crown. Her shield was in the shape of a golden bird with a white gemstone in the center of it and her weapon was a silver sword. Golden Girl had a production variation in her cape: she was sometimes produced with a blue and gold cape similar to Saphire's.
- Saphire is the poweress of the Sea and Sky, and is the member of the Sea Folk of the Cluster Isles. Saphire has an ability to communicate with the creatures of the sea and the sky, and from them she receives a special strength to help win against the evil forces of the Dragon Queen. Saphire wore a blue one-shouldered bodice with golden accents. Her cape is blue and gold, and her boots and wrist gauntlets are dark blue with gold accents. Saphire's eye makeup was blue and white, her earrings were blue and her lipstick was pink. She had light blonde hair and a gold headband. Saphire's shield was white and gold, in the shape of a star with a blue gemstone in the center of it and her weapon was a bladed lance. Saphire had a few production variations in both hair and make up: her hair was produced in both light blonde or dark blonde, and her eye makeup had two variants (one much heavier than the other).
- Rubee is a fiery champion on the Lightning Bow and a red-headed expert archeress from the Fire Isle. Her weapons are a silver bow and flare-tipped arrows.
- Onyx is the challenger of the Sabered Sword from the Isle of Dunes. Her weapons are throwing stones that possess accuracy and return to her hand after being thrown and a saber with a serrated edge.
- Jade is a mystic of the Secret Jewels from the Ermaline Island. She uses a broadsword and possesses mystical insights.
- Prince Kroma is a brave and daring hero, who occasionally joins to the Guardians and his nemesis is Ogra.

=== Dragon Queen's Forces of Evil ===
- Dragon Queen lives on Storm Isle after being banished from Argonia. She uses dark magic and carries a samurai sword. She rides a black horse called Shadow.
- Vultura practices witchcraft and is armed with long, sharp claws.
- Moth Lady: Born from a cocoon, she has wings and carries a trident.
- Wild One is armed with knowledge of the wild and she carries a battle-axe.
- Ogra is the leader of the group known as the Barbarian Forces and occasionally joins Dragon Queen in fighting the Guardians.

== Unproduced concepts ==
Concept drawings of additional action figures, playsets and accessories exist.

=== The Guardians of the Gemstones ===
A very small quantity of the Dymondia figure was released in Europe. The figure appears to be a repaint of the Rubee figure rather than including any unique molding, which seems to indicate the Dymondia figures may have been prototypes that Galoob was using to sell Series 2 to retailers. The Dymondia figure was in a new blue Series 2 box as opposed to the pink Series 1 box design. None of the other Series 2 Guardians of the Gemstones characters are known to have been produced.

- Dymondia's bodice, gauntlets, skirt and boots were white with dark pink accents in a fanned shape. Instead of a cape, she had light pink wings, similar to those of a bird (as opposed to Moth Lady's insect-like wings). Dymondia's hair was white, and looks like it was designed to sparkle. She wore a golden headband with a diamond at the center near her forehead. Dymondia's diamond-shaped shield was white, dark pink and gold and contained a diamond gemstone. Her weapon was a white and gold staff, topped by a diamond.
- Coral's bodice and boots were white, with golden shells embellished on them. Her crown and wrist gauntlets were golden, and her crown had a golden netting that cascaded over her hair. Coral's hair was pink. She carried a white shield with red embellishments and a white and gold trident.
- Turquoise's bodice was white with blue details and white flowers. She wore a blue cape and her white boots have a tasseled fringe. Turquoise had black hair and wears a white crown with a flower design on it, as well as white hair ties on her pigtails. Turquoise's look seems to be inspired by a Native American motif. She carries a white shield with a blue gemstone and a white staff.
- Pearl's bodice, gauntlets and boots were white with embellishments of gold. She wore a dark pink skirt and sash over her bodice, along with a short cape that was dark pink and white. Pearl had blonde hair and wore a white butterfly shaped crown. Pearl carried a white shield and a white staff, both with gold embellishments.

=== The Forces of Evil ===
None of the Series 2 Forces of Evil characters are known to have been produced.

- Spidra had a webbed design on her green bodice, gauntlets and boots. Spidra's cape was a black weblike material and a red spider spanned across her bodice. Her eye makeup was green and white and she looked to have makeup or a tattoo on the right side of her face that spanned from her forehead down to her jawline. Spidra had fiery red hair and wore a green jeweled crown in the shape of a spiderweb. Her shield was green, with a red gemstone and she carried a sword.
- Centaura was a red centaur with black hair and a beard. His lower body was that of a horse, with a spiked tail and spiked hooves. He was to wear a black chestplate with silver markings. Centaura wore gauntlets, carried a shield and a black double-edged spear.
