= Scott Siegel =

American novelist

Scott Warren Siegel is an American writer of mostly young adult shared universe science-fiction and fantasy, generally with his wife Barbara Siegel. Many of their novels were published in the 1980s and 1990s. In later years, he and his wife turned to writing related to the theatre and film.

== Bibliography ==
=== Fiction ===
- Dark Forces (novel series):
  - The Companion (1983)
  - Beat the Devil (1983).
- Twistaplot: Ghost Riders of Goldspur (1985), with Barbara Siegel.
- Preludes (Dragonlance series): Tanis, the Shadow Years (1990) with Barbara Siegel
- Find Your Fate: James Bond in Strike it Deadly (1985) with Barbara Siegel
- G.I. Joe: Find Your Fate
  - 6 Operation: Death Stone (1986) with Barbara Siegel
  - 13 Operation: Snow Job (1987) with Barbara Siegel
  - 17 Operation: Sink or Swim (1987) with Barbara Siegel
- Fire Brats
  - 1 The Burning Land (1987) with Barbara Siegel
  - 2 Survivors (1987) with Barbara Siegel
  - 3 Thunder Mountain (1987) with Barbara Siegel
  - 4 Shockwave (1988) with Barbara Siegel
- Ghostworld
  - 1 Beyond Terror (1991) with Barbara Siegel
  - 2 Midnight Chill (1991) with Barbara Siegel
  - 3 Dark Fire (1992) with Barbara Siegel
  - 4 Cold Dread (1992) with Barbara Siegel
  - 5 Fatal Fear (1992) with Barbara Siegel
  - 6 Final Frenzy (1993) with Barbara Siegel
- Wizards, Warriors and You
  - 6 Revenge of the Falcon Knight (1985)
  - 12 The Scarlet Shield of Shalimar (1986) with Barbara Siegel
  - 18 Warrior Women of Weymouth (1986) with Barbara Siegel
- Star Trek: Phaser Fight (1986) with Barbara Siegel
- Junior Transformers: Battle Drive * (1985)
- Which Way Books: The Champion of TV Wrestling * (1986)

=== Shortfiction ===
- The Blood Sea Monster (1987) with Barbara Siegel
- The Storyteller (1987) with Barbara Siegel
- A Painter's Vision (1987) with Barbara Siegel

=== Anthologies ===
- Tales from Tethedril (1998)

=== Non fiction ===
- The Winona Ryder Scrapbook (1997) with Barbara Siegel
- Introduction (Tales from Tethedril) (1998)
- The Encyclopedia of Hollywood (1990)
