= Steven Otfinoski =

Author and playwright from Connecticut, United States

- Born: January 11, 1949 (age 77); Queens, New York
- Education: Boston University
- Occupations: Writer, playwright
- Children: 2

Steven Otfinoski is an author and playwright from Connecticut. Most of his books are aimed at young readers. He has written well in excess of 100 books. He is also the author of African Americans in the Performing Arts (A to Z of African Americans). Two music-related books he wrote were The Golden Age of Rock Instrumentals and The Golden Age of Novelty Songs. He has written books about people such as Nelson Mandela: the fight against apartheid, and Oprah Winfrey: television star.

== Background ==
Oftinoski is a married father of four who lives in Connecticut with his family. He graduated from Antioch College in Yellow Springs, Ohio and attended Boston University. He has written over 100 books for young readers. FRom 1972 to 1973 he was a news reporter for The Hartford Times. From 1974 to 1975, he was editor for Read magazine. From 1975 onwards he has been a freelance writer. From 1992 onwards he has been with the traveling theater company, History Alive, which brings history alive for American students, with student participation after the play.

== Written works ==
In his book The Golden Age of Rock Instrumentals, he says that Surf music with its stage behavior, its untamed nature was the precursor to garage, punk and grunge. He has also written a book about surfing, Extreme Surfing which was published in 2012.

=== Children's books ===
His book Coin Collecting for Kids was published in 2000. A later publication, The Child Labor Reform Movement: An Interactive History Adventure is aimed at 9 and 10 year olds.

== Plays ==
In December 2014 15th through to the 21st, his play Stratford Characters, a story about local historical figures was running at Square One Theater in Connecticut. Along with other productions, it received critical praise in mid 2015. A short play he wrote was run acted out at the Berkshire Playwrights Lab festival, held in late January 2017. His short play All You Can Eat which was one of six short plays inspired by the theme of food will take place in Stratford late March.
