= Kevin Stein =

American poet

Kevin Stein (born January 1, 1954, in Anderson, Indiana) is a poet and professor of English at the Bradley University in Peoria, Illinois. The fourth poet laureate of the State of Illinois, he held the post from 2003 to 2017. He started teaching at Bradley University in 1984, and then became the Caterpillar Professor of English and the Coordinator of the Creative Writing Program.

== Biography ==
He received his Ph.D. in American literature and an M.A. in creative writing from Indiana University. Shortly after, he went to Bradley University (1984), where he has been a poet and professor of English at the Bradley University in Peoria, Illinois and currently has the title of the Caterpillar Professor of English and is the coordinator of the Creative Writing Program.

In December 2003, he was named the Illinois Poet Laureate. He stepped down from the role in December 2017.

== Awards ==
- Order of Lincoln (State's highest honor), 2017

== Works ==
- Wrestling Li Po for the Remote (Fifth Star Press, 2013)
- Sufficiency of the Actual (University of Illinois Press, 2009)
- American Ghost Roses (University of Illinois Press, 2005)
- Chance Ransom (University of Illinois Press, 2000)
- Bruised Paradise (University of Illinois Press, 1996)
- A Circus of Want (University of Missouri Press)
- The Figure Our Bodies Make (St. Louis Poetry Center, 1988)
- A Field of Wings (Illinois Writers, Inc., 1986)
- Poetry’s Afterlife: Verse in the Digital Age (University of Michigan Press, 2010)
- Private Poets, Worldly Acts
- James Wright: The Poetry of a Grown Man (Ohio University Press, 1989)
