= Suzanne Levine (podiatrist) =

Suzanne M. Levine
- Born: 28 June 1951 (age 75); New York City, New York, U.S.
- Education: Doctor of Podiatric Medicine
- Alma mater: Columbia University, New York College of Podiatric Medicine
- Occupations: Podiatric Physician and Foot Surgeon
- Organization: Institute Beauté
- Known for: Inventing aesthetic podiatric treatment; My Feet Are Killing Me! (book)
- Website: institutebeaute.com/dr-suzanne-levine

Suzanne M. Levine, DPM, PC, is an American clinical podiatrist and a foot surgeon at the NewYork–Presbyterian Hospital, Lenox Hill Hospital and The Center for Specialty Care in New York City, New York, United States. She is best known for her book My Feet Are Killing Me!, and for her contributions to several notable newspapers, magazines and TV shows. Levine practices at her New York City podiatry clinic and medical-spa, Institute Beauté.

== Career ==
Levine contributes regularly as a foot care expert on NBC's The Today Show and WNBC's Today in New York. She has also featured on The Dr. Oz Show, The Doctors (2008), The Oprah Winfrey Show, Entertainment Tonight, Extra, ABC 20/20, The View, Nightline, and Good Morning America. She is credited for inventing the tootsie technique and has participated in a medical mission in Cambodia where she donated one thousand pair of shoes to a local village.

== Publications ==
In addition to her medical practice, Levine is the author of My Feet Are Killing Me!, 50 Ways To Ease Foot Pain, Your Feet Don't Have To Hurt, The Botox Book, and You Don't Need Plastic Surgery with Everett Lautin. Her books have featured on The Couch of CBS 2 New York in a segment called "Beautiful Feet Solutions."
