= Trampas Whiteman =

American writer

Trampas Whiteman is an American writer.

== Early life and education ==
Trampas Whiteman grew up in the rural town of Odessa, Missouri. After graduating high school, he attended Central Missouri State University where he gained a Bachelor of Science in broadcasting and film.

== Game design and comic books ==
Whiteman is the founder of the Whitestone Council, the fan organization behind the Dragonlance Nexus. Since the founding of the council, Trampas has worked with Sovereign Press/Margaret Weis Productions as a designer on the Dragonlance sourcebooks for 3rd edition, including Holy Orders of the Stars, Knightly Orders of Ansalon, and Races of Ansalon. He has contributed to many other Dragonlance sourcebooks, functioning as a compiler and contributor for Lost Leaves from the Inn of the Last Home. Trampas also has credits in Bastion Press' Pale Designs sourcebook, as well as Whitesilver Publishing's Elves sourcebook for Sovereign Stone.

Trampas also wrote the script adaptation for The Legend of Huma comic book series, from issues #3–5 (Dabel Brothers) and #6 (Devil's Due Publishing).

== Podcasting ==
Whiteman once worked on The Signal, the fan podcast for Firefly and Serenity, writing and reading the "Gaming in the 'Verse" section. He has since moved on to co-create the Dragonlance Canticle and SciFi Smackdown podcasts.

== Bibliography ==
Whiteman has contributed to the following works:

- Weis, Margaret; Chambers, Jamie; Coyle, Christopher (2003). Age of Mortals. Sovereign Press. ISBN 1-931567-10-7.
- Banks, Cam; La Roché, Andre (2004). Bestiary of Krynn. Sovereign Press. ISBN 1-931567-13-1.
- Weis, Margaret; Don Perrin; Jamie Chambers; Christopher Coyle (2003). Dragonlance Campaign Setting. Wizards of the Coast. ISBN 0-7869-3086-1.
- Pierson, Chris; Banks, Cam; Everette, Sean; Whiteman, Trampas (2005). Holy Orders of the Stars. Sovereign Press. ISBN 1-931567-15-8.
- Everette, Sean; Whiteman, Trampas; Valentine, Clark; Harsch, Nicole (2006). Knightly Orders of Ansalon. Sovereign Press. ISBN 1-931567-37-9.
- Weis, Margaret; Hickman, Tracy; Jamie Chambers (2004). War of the Lance. Sovereign Press. ISBN 1-931567-14-X.
- Knaak, Richard; Whiteman, Trampas; Jordan, Sean J. (2004). Legend of Huma #3. Devil's Due/Dabel Brothers.
- Knaak, Richard; Whiteman, Trampas; Jordan, Sean J. (2004). Legend of Huma #4. Devil's Due/Dabel Brothers.
- Knaak, Richard; Whiteman, Trampas; Jordan, Sean J. (2004). Legend of Huma #5. Devil's Due/Dabel Brothers.
- Knaak, Richard; Whiteman, Trampas; Jordan, Sean J. (2005). Legend of Huma #6. Devil's Due/Dabel Brothers.
