= Love and War (Dragonlance) =

1987 anthology of fantasy stories

- The cover of the first edition of Love and War
- Author: Margaret Weis and Tracy Hickman
- Cover artist: Larry Elmore
- Language: English
- Series: Dragonlance
- Genre: Fantasy novel
- Publisher: Wizards of the Coast
- Publication date: November, 1987 (mass market paperback)
- Publication place: United States
- Media type: Print (Paperback)
- Pages: 368 pp
- ISBN: 0-88038-519-7
- OCLC: 17280418
- Dewey Decimal: 813/.0876/08354 19
- LC Class: PS648.F3 L68 1987
- Preceded by: Kender, Gully Dwarves, and Gnomes

Love and War is an anthology of fantasy stories published by TSR, Inc. in 1987. It was published under the Dragonlance brand name and is set in that brand's fictional world of Krynn. It is the ninth Dragonlance novel to be published, and the third book in the "Dragonlance Tales" series, all three books of which are anthologies of stories set in the Dragonlance milieu. The other two books in this series are The Magic of Krynn and Kender, Gully Dwarves, and Gnomes. Unlike the Dragonlance novels published up until that point, the Tales books do not exclusively follow one group of characters, but instead range across the entire scope of the setting.

== Plot introduction ==
The book is a compilation of 10 short stories from various authors taking place in the fictional world of Krynn:

1. "A Good Knight's Tale" by Harold Bakst. Told by a Knight of Solamnia, this is a tale that of a selfish father, Aron, who is overprotective over his daughter, Petal, which ultimately leads to a broken heart.
2. "A Painter's Vision" by Barbara Siegel and Scott Siegel. When a passionate artist Seron dies in an accidental fire, his widow Kyra finds the strength to carry on his memory through a painting. Kyra carries on a strange relationship with a dragon named Tosch, who had befriended her husband before he died.
3. "Hunting Destiny" by Nick O'Donohoe. This is the tale of the undead who haunt Darken Wood, in another of Donohoe's interpretation of an event that took place in the novel Dragons of Autumn Twilight.
4. "Hide and Go Seek" by Nancy Varian Berberick. Starts with a captive boy named Keli who is captured by a man named Tigo and a goblin named Staag. No sooner is Tasslehoff Burrfoot captured. They are later rescued by The Companions.
5. "By the Measure" by Richard A. Knaak.
6. "The Exiles" by Paul B. Thompson and Tonya C. Cook. It is the story of Sturm Brightblade's childhood as he and his mother are captured by a ship with guards from an island called Kernaffi.
7. "Heart of Goldmoon" by Laura Hickman and Kate Novak.
8. "Raistlin's Daughter" by Margaret Weis and Dezra Despain. The mysterious tale of the legend of a daughter fathered by the mage Raistlin Majere. This tale is also reprinted in the novel The Second Generation.
9. "Silver and Steel" by Kevin Randle.
10. "From the Yearning for War and the War's Ending" by Michael Williams.
