= Dragonlance Nexus =

The Dragonlance Nexus
- Website type: Fan website
- Available in: English
- Owner: Trampas Whiteman (formerly owned by Matt Haag)
- Creators: Numerous fan contributors, with some parts written by published Dragonlance authors.
- Website: dragonlancenexus.com
- Commercial: No
- Registration: No
- Launched: January 2001; 25 years ago
- Current status: Online

The Dragonlance Nexus is a Dragonlance fansite that was created in 1996 as "Dragon Realm". The site was overhauled and a new name was given to it as the "Dragonlance Nexus". Beginning on November 28, 2005, the site began publishing articles written by established authors starting with an article on Jaymes Markham by the author Douglas Niles. Other authors have contributed to the Lexicon, such as Nancy Varian Berberick, Mary H. Herbert, Kevin T. Stein, and more recently Jean Rabe. Some of the articles found in the site have been published in the Dragonlance Campaign Setting by Sovereign Press.

== Origins ==
The Dragonlance Nexus traces its origins past 1996, but its current form was launched in January 2001.

The origin of the Nexus begins with a small site called "the Dragon's Realm." The site was started in the summer of 1996 as an experiment by long-time staff member Matt Haag aka Paladin to learn HTML and to talk about some of the AD&D Gold Box videogames he was playing at the time.

In late 1996, the Dragon's Realm joined the Forgotten Realms Webring. Paladin started one of the first Dragonlance Webrings to highlight his favorite campaign world. Unfortunately, the Dragon's Realm didn't really fit the Dragonlance mold, so a new site called "The Lost Citadel" was created. Both sites existed in the same 1 MB directory on GeoCities. (To put that in perspective, the current version of the Nexus is over 90 times larger.) The Lost Citadel was invited to join an exclusive Dragonlance Webring called the 'Top 5% of Kender Sites,' run by the Sean MacDonald (aka Kipper Snifferdoo), keeper of the Kencyclopedia website.

The Lost Citadel continued to expand to cover other areas of Dragonlance material, beyond its traditional magic focus. Eventually, the site was spun off into a new site called "The World of Krynn," which went online in November 1997. The following month, the products and Fifth Age sections were added by Paladin, and the site moved off of GeoCities to a dedicated web host. Late the following year, the site's back end was upgraded to support the then-popular Netscape Communicator 4.0 to simplify some of the site's maintenance.

== Dragonlance.com era ==
The World of Krynn was continually expanded and updated, and outgrew several web hosts between December 1997 and August 1999. In addition, the first of several incarnations of the message boards were put online; around this time, other volunteer staff were added to help out with the message boards and some of the site's content.

However, the major change happened in 1999, when Paladin acquired the Dragonlance.com domain name from the previous owner in August 1999. At this point, The World of Krynn disappeared and became simply "Dragonlance.com." With the move to Dragonlance.com, the site's mission changed as well: instead of publishing a repository of background information, the main focus of the site became more fan-centric, posting artwork, fiction, poetry and music created by the fans, while keeping all of the reference material and product information.

In January 2000, the sheer amount of content prompted Paladin to move much of it into a database, which allowed volunteer staff the ability to directly update and add new content. In June of that year, the site was redesigned once again to make the information easier to understand, and new staff members were brought in to help with the growing amount of content.

With that, the pre-history of the Nexus ends and its story begins.

== Nexus era ==
The origins of the Nexus date back to January 2001, when a flurry of events were happening at once. Jim Butler, who was an employee of Wizards of the Coast at the time, announced that Wizards of the Coast would no longer publish Dragonlance gaming materials in December 2000. With the backing of famed Dragonlance author Tracy Hickman, a group of fans on the Dragonlance-L mailing list volunteered to create a new Dragonlance site that would take over where Wizards left off, updating Dragonlance to the Dungeons & Dragons 3rd Edition rules. This group came to be known as the Whitestone Council.

Under the guidance of Tracy Hickman, and with feedback from fans from across the world, the Whitestone Council created the Dragonlance Nexus, which was launched in mid January 2001. As previously noted, the key focus of the Dragonlance Nexus was to create a set of Dungeons and Dragons 3rd Edition rules for Dragonlance, which would be the foundation upon which the future of Dragonlance gaming. This online product was called Dragonlance Adventures 3rd Edition, or DLA3e for short.

Work continued on the project, and the Nexus expanded to include recipes, artwork, news, and many other features over the course of the next year. However, in March 2002, the Dragonlance gaming line was licensed to Sovereign Press. Beginning in April, the Whitestone Council soon found itself working with Sovereign Press on a new sourcebook, the Dragonlance Campaign Setting (or DLCS for short). Materials from DLA3e were incorporated into the DLCS, and the Whitestone Council continues to serve as an advisory board for future projects Sovereign Press projects to this day.

Later that summer, the Nexus partnered with Dragonlance.com to expand the reach of its content. Many of the Nexus's fan gaming rules were hosted on Dragonlance.com; in return, the extensive reference material from Dragonlance.com was added to the Nexus in a sharing agreement set up between the two sites.

This arrangement continued until June 2003, when the two sites were formally merged into the current Nexus site, and the Dragonlance.com domain name was transferred to Sovereign Press to promote the d20 Dragonlance gaming line.

Today, the Dragonlance Nexus, along with the Whitestone Council, serve as an advisory board to Sovereign Press, and review each product that Sovereign Press releases to check for continuity errors. The site also has well over 15,000 articles of fan artwork, gaming rules, articles, music, recipes, and many other items related to the Dragonlance setting.

To further expand to meet the needs of the fans, the Dragonlance Lexicon was launched on September 16, 2005, with high anticipation. Not only was the Lexicon built for the fans, but also it was to assist authors in being able to find information on what they were going to write about. Following the launch of the Lexicon the very first author submission was by Douglas Niles on his character Jaymes Markham, with other authors such as Nancy Varian Berberick, Mary H. Herbert, and Kevin Stein all submitting articles.

Following the launch of the Lexicon came the launch of the new Palanthas Herald on October 20, 2005. This was created to allow fans to create adventure ideas in the settings of the city of Palanthas. This would also assist Game Masters in quickly getting ideas on how to run a campaign.

== New site address ==
On April 24, 2006, Trampas and Matt made the decision to change the address of the site from www.dl3e.com (Dragonlance 3rd Edition) to www.dlnexus.com. This was a move because the new address would better reflect the broader mission of the Nexus than just dealing in 3rd edition D&D. With the inclusion of the Herald and the Lexicon, and the possible change to 4th edition D&D, the site needed to better reflect what it did. The old site address will still be retained though.

== Dragonlance Canticle ==
On March 7, 2007, launch of the Dragonlance Canticle podcast site and Episode 0, a first of its kind for Dragonlance fans. Six days later, Episode 1 was launched and even had the guest voices of Tracy and Laura Hickman. The plan use of the podcast is to allow for round table discussions, author interviews, book discussion, trivia, and just general information on the Dragonlance world, and was hosted by Trampas Whiteman. In 2010, Tristan Zimmerman became the host.

== Reception ==
The site won the gold ENnie for best fan site on August 16, 2007, at Gen Con.

== Additional sources ==
- Dragonlance Nexus History
- Tracy Hickman's Website
- Wizard's DoDD Book
- Wizard's DLCS
- The Kencyclopedia
- Dragons Landing Podcast Alpha 66
