= Don Perrin =

Canadian writer

- Born: October 1, 1964 (age 61); Iserlohn, Germany
- Occupation: Novelist
- Spouse: Margaret Weis (divorced) Kathryn Plamback
- Website: donperrin.com

Don Perrin (born 1 October 1964) is a Canadian writer and former military officer.

== Early life and education ==
Born in Iserlohn, Germany, Perrin grew up in Kingston, ON, Canada, McMasterville, QC, Canada, Bromley, Kent, England, and Ottawa, ON, Canada. Perrin served in the Canadian Corps of Electrical and Mechanical Engineers, in the Canadian Department of National Defence. He holds a Bachelor of Science in Mathematics and Physics from the Royal Military College of Canada in 1987.

== Career ==
Don Perrin was Vice President of Operations with Mag Force 7, Inc. He wrote a series of novels in the Mag Force 7 series, with the first hitting the shelf in April 1995. He has three successful collectible game designs to his credit with Star of the Guardians Collectible Trading Card Game and Wing Commander Collectible Trading Card Game, and the Star Trek: the Card Game. Perrin has also designed role playing products for Imperium Games's Traveller RPG Universe. For the fourth edition of Traveller (also called Marc Miller's Traveller or T4) published by Imperium in 1996, each of the designers worked on separate portions of the rules, with Perrin writing rules for starships. Perrin then worked on the game Zero (1997) for Archangel Entertainment. Perrin is also a contributor to the Dragonlance novel series.

Perrin and Lester Smith designed the Sovereign Stone RPG (1998) based on the trilogy of Sovereign Stone books, and Margaret Weis formed the company Sovereign Press with herself as CEO to publish the RPG. Perrin announced on April 17, 2001, that Sovereign Press would replace its original game system for Sovereign Stone with a line based on the d20 System. To support the setting, Weis and Perrin wrote a short story titled "Shadamehr and the Old Wives Tale" which was published in Dragon #264 (October, 1999). Wizards of the Coast licensed the Dragonlance setting to Sovereign Press as the result of an agreement in 2002 to be used for role-playing publication; Weis and Perrin wrote the Dragonlance Campaign Setting (2003), with Jamie Chambers and Christopher Coyle, which Wizards of the Coast published, and afterwards allowed Sovereign Press to further expand on the material in that book by publishing supplements making use of the d20 license. Perrin left Sovereign Press in 2004, and Weis then formed the new company Margaret Weis Productions.

Perrin acted as an advisor for Margaret Weis on the final Star of the Guardians novel, Ghost Legion (in which he also appears as a character). The couple co-authored the Mag Force 7 novels.

Don Perrin, Michael Cosentino, and Kathryn Plamback purchased the two US wargaming magazines, "The Courier" and "MWAN", and combined them into the Historical Miniature Gamer Magazine in 2005. This magazine won the Nonfiction Publication of the Year Award at the 32nd Annual Origins Awards. The magazine offered articles on wargaming/wargames (of widely varied periods), tips on painting, building hints, scenarios, reviews of wargaming books, rules, miniatures and a monthly column by Howard Whitehouse. In 2007, James Manto was brought in as editor-in-chief to help with the organization and structure of the articles. Taking advantage of Perrin's QPOD (Quality Printing on Demand) in-house printing (where small numbers of books, rules, and supplements can be printed inexpensively), the magazine underwent a complete overhaul to an easy-to-hold quarterly magazine. The magazine was closed in 2008.

== Personal life ==
Perrin was married to Margaret Weis, though they are now divorced. Perrin married Kathryn Plamback in Las Vegas, Nevada, in 2016. He lives in Las Vegas, Nevada.

== Bibliography ==
=== Mag Force 7 series ===
- The Knights of the Black Earth (1995), ISBN 0-451-45425-1
- Robot Blues (1996), ISBN 0-451-45581-9
- Hung Out (1998), ISBN 0-451-45618-1

=== Dragonlance universe ===
- Theros Ironfeld (1996), ISBN 0-7869-0481-X
- The Doom Brigade (1996), ISBN 0-7869-0526-3
- Brothers in Arms (1999), ISBN 0-7869-1429-7
- Draconian Measures (2000), ISBN 0-7869-1678-8
- Bertrem's Guide to the War of Souls Volume Two (1 November 2002), Wizards of the Coast, ISBN 0-7869-2816-6, with Steven T. Brown and Mary H. Herbert

=== Warcraft universe ===
- Lord of the Clans (1 October 2001), ISBN 0-7434-2690-8

=== Short works ===
- "First Dragon Army Bridge Building Company" (in Dragons of Krynn)
- "Island of the Brutes" (in The History of Dragonlance)
- "War Diary of Lord Ariaken" (in Dragons of Summer Flame)

=== Tabletop RPG books ===
- Dragonlance Campaign Setting (1 August 2003), Wizards of the Coast, ISBN 0-7869-3086-1
- Starships: Traveller (1996), Imperium Games, ISBN 1-57828-301-9
- Sovereign Stone Game System (July 2000), Sovereign Press, ISBN 0-9658422-7-4, with Lester Smith
