= Land of the Minotaurs =

1996 novel by Richard A. Knaak

- Cover of the first edition
- Language: English
- Genre: Fantasy
- Published: 1996
- Publication place: United States
- Media type: Print (Paperback)
- ISBN: 0-7869-0472-0

Land of the Minotaurs is a fantasy novel by American writer Richard A. Knaak, set in the world of Dragonlance, and based on the Dungeons & Dragons role-playing game. It is the fourth novel in the "Lost Histories" series. It was published in paperback in January 1996. It continues the story of Kaz the Minotaur from The Legend of Huma, Kaz the Minotaur, and the short story "Kaz and the Dragon's Children" from The Dragons of Krynn.

== Plot summary ==
Land of the Minotaurs is a novel in which the minotaur empire is in decline, and a group of minotaurs living in a small encampment are trying to preserve their way of life, the spirit of which has been corrupted by the ruling minotaurs who dominate the capital city.

== Reception ==
Tim Smith reviewed Land of the Minotaurs for Arcane magazine, rating it a 2 out of 10 overall. According to Smith, "Apparently this is a New York Times bestseller; apparently the author has a good track record; apparently minotaurs can happily survive outside of Greek legend. And apparently we still have to put up with pot boilers like this that aim to flesh out the ethos of the Dragonlance world." Smith suggested: "This should have a small logo with a piece of ancient hemp-rope and a dollar sign somewhere. You're better off sticking with your own imagination, which will far outshine anything you can find here. TSR must do much more to support their games than knock out this old, forumulaic, badly crafted pap."
