= Kender, Gully Dwarves, and Gnomes =

1987 anthology of fantasy stories

- Kender, Gully Dwarves, and Gnomes book cover
- Author: Margaret Weis and Tracy Hickman
- Cover artist: Larry Elmore
- Language: English
- Series: Tales, Dragonlance
- Genre: Fantasy novel
- Publisher: TSR, Inc. (original edition) / Wizards of the Coast (current)
- Publication date: August, 1987 (mass market paperback)
- Publication place: United States
- Media type: Print (Paperback)
- Pages: 364 pp
- ISBN: 0-88038-382-8
- OCLC: 16852500
- Preceded by: The Magic of Krynn
- Followed by: Love and War

Kender, Gully Dwarves, and Gnomes is an anthology of fantasy stories published by TSR, Inc. in 1987. It was published under the Dragonlance brand name and is set in that brand's fictional world of Krynn. It is the eighth Dragonlance novel to be published, and the second book in the "Dragonlance Tales" series, all three books of which are anthologies of stories set in the Dragonlance milieu. The other two books in this series are The Magic of Krynn and Love and War. Unlike the Dragonlance novels published up until that point, the Tales books do not exclusively follow one group of characters, but instead range across the entire scope of the setting.

== Plot introduction ==
The book is a compilation of 10 short stories from various authors taking place in the fictional world of Krynn:

1. "Snowsong" by Nancy Varian Berberick. This tale tells the story of an early adventure of the Companions. Tanis Half-Elven and Sturm Brightblade are caught in a blizzard and their only hope of being rescued lies in the kender, Tasslehoff Burrfoot.
2. "The Wizard's Spectacles" by Morris Simon.
3. "The Storyteller" by Barbara Siegel and Scott Siegel.
4. "A Shaggy Dog's Tail" by Danny Peary. This story tells the tale of an abusive soldier's hunt for escaped prisoners, and his encounter along the way with a solicitous witch.
5. "Lord Toede's Disastrous Hunt" by Harold Bakst. This is the story of the (first) demise and death of the Dragon Highlord, Fewmaster Toede.
6. "Definitions of Honor" by Richard A. Knaak. This is a tale of a young Knight of Solamnia, Torbin, who rides to the rescue of a village against a minotaur.
7. "Hearth Cat and Winter Wren" by Nancy Varian Berberick. This is another tale of an early adventure of the Companions. A young Raistlin Majere uses his magic to help his friends against an evil wizard.
8. "'Wanna Bet?'" by Margaret Weis and Tracy Hickman. This is the tale of Caramon Majere's three sons: Palin, Tanin, and Sturm Majere who accidentally find themselves in an adventure to recover the Graygem of Gargath after losing a bet with a mysterious dwarf named Dougan Redhammer. This tale is also reprinted in the novel, The Second Generation.
9. "Into the Heart of the Story" by Michael Williams. A gnome, Virum, tells his version of authorship of the songs involved about the heroes of the War of the Lance.
10. "Dagger-Flight" by Nick O'Donohoe. A tale told from the viewpoint of a dagger involved in the novel, Dragons of Autumn Twilight.

== Reception ==
Kender, Gully Dwarves, and Gnomes reached 15 on the New York Times bestseller list on September 13, 1987.
