= The Magic of Krynn =

1987 collection of short stories

- The Magic of Krynn book cover
- Author: Margaret Weis and Tracy Hickman
- Cover artist: Larry Elmore
- Language: English
- Series: Tales, Dragonlance
- Genre: Fantasy novel
- Publisher: Wizards of the Coast
- Publication date: April, 1987 (mass market paperback)
- Publication place: United States
- Media type: Print (Paperback)
- Pages: 352 pp
- ISBN: 0-88038-454-9
- OCLC: 15727154
- Followed by: Kender, Gully Dwarves, and Gnomes

The Magic of Krynn is a New York Times bestseller fantasy novel released in April 1987. It is a collection of short stories written about the various characters set in the Dragonlance campaign series. This novel is the first of a trilogy of the Tales series.

== Plot introduction ==
The book is a compilation of 10 short stories from various authors taking place in the fictional world of Krynn:

1. "Riverwind and the Crystal Staff" by Michael Williams. The tale is a narrative poem that describes the search for the Blue Crystal Staff by Riverwind.
2. "The Blood Sea Monster" by Barbara Siegel and Scott Siegel. This is a tale written in first person perspective by an elf named Duder Basillart, who in the spring of 352 AC, lives in a small fishing village off the coast of the Blood Sea of Istar. While running from a baker named Thick-Neck Nick after stealing a loaf of bread, Duder meets an old human fisherman, Six-Finger Fiske, who recruits the elf to catch the legendary Blood Sea Monster.
3. "A Stone's Throw Away" by Roger E. Moore. This tale is about the adventure of the kender, Tasslehoff Burrfoot, using a teleporting ring that he had found during a murder committed in Solace. The story takes place in a citadel of an evil human magus.
4. "Dreams of Darkness, Dreams of Light" by Warren B. Smith.
5. "Love and Ale" by Nick O'Donohoe.
6. "Wayward Children" by Richard A. Knaak. This tale involves a group of Draconian soldiers who stumble into a mysterious village inhabited by older elves.
7. "The Test of the Twins" by Margaret Weis. This is the tale of Raistlin Majere taking the infamous "Test" at Tower of High Sorcery in Wayreth. The short story was published in a 1984 Dragon magazine as the very first Dragonlance tale.
8. "Harvests" by Nancy Varian Berberick. This is the tale of a young Tanis Half-Elven and Flint Fireforge, who in the autumn of 329 AC, enter a forest and befriend a female human named Riana. Her traveling companions, Karel and Daryn, have been taken by an evil mage named Gadar. Tanis and Flint agree to journey with her to rescue them. On their way, they are attacked by four phantoms controlled by Gadar. After a short fight, they are able to defeat the phantoms by using fire. Gadar wants Tanis to come to him so the mage could use his life essence to sustain him, so Gadar has another phantom take Tanis to his castle. Tanis, however, is rescued by Flint when the dwarf bursts in while the mage is casting the spell for Tanis's life essence. Tanis tackles Gadar, and soon discovers Gadar's young son who looks to be between 12–13 years old, but was much, much older. The boy asks Tanis for permission to die, and Tanis grants it holding the boy until he passes away.
9. "Finding the Faith" by Mary Kirchoff.
10. "The Legacy" by Margaret Weis and Tracy Hickman. This is the tale of Palin Majere, the mage son of Caramon, who takes the Test in the Tower of High Sorcery while the conclave believe that the mage's uncle, Raistlin, is still alive and is trying to steal Palin's body to return to the world. This tale is also retold in the novel, The Second Generation.

== Reception ==
Magic of Krynn was on the New York Times best seller list from April 26, 1987 to June 7, 1987.
