= Age of Mortals: Dragonlance Campaign Setting Companion =

Dungeons & Dragons role-playing game accessory

- Cover
- Authors: Margaret Weis, Jamie Chambers and Christopher Coyle
- Genre: Role-playing game
- Publisher: Sovereign Press
- Publication date: 2003
- Pages: 224
- ISBN: 978-1931567107

Age of Mortals is an accessory for the Dungeons & Dragons fantasy role-playing game that describes the Dragonlance setting in the fictional time period of The Age of Mortals.

== Contents ==
Age of Mortals is a supplement to the Dragonlance Campaign Setting, which it was published just after. It describes regions of Ansalon that the campaign setting book does not cover, and gives game rules for new races such as the Tarmak and classes such as the mystic.

== Reviews ==
- Backstab #46
- Fictional Reality (Issue 14 - Dec 2003)
- Legions Realm Monthly (Issue 14 - Nov 2003)
