= The Dragons of Krynn =

1994 collection of fantasy short stories

- Cover of the first edition
- Editors: Margaret Weis; Tracy Hickman
- Language: English
- Series: Dragons Anthologies
- Genre: Fantasy
- Published: 1994
- Publication place: United States
- Media type: Print (Paperback)

The Dragons of Krynn is a collection of fantasy short stories, released in March 1994. It includes stories written about the mightiest creatures of Krynn, the dragons. It is the first of a trilogy of the Anthologies series.

== Plot introduction ==
The book is a compilation of 10 short stories from various authors taking place in the fictional world of Krynn:

1. "Seven Hymns of the Dragon" by Michael Williams. The tale is a narrative poem.
2. "The Final Touch" by Michael and Teri Williams. This is a tale written about the druidess L'Indasha who found an egg of a dragon.
3. "Night of Falling Stars" by Nancy Varian Berberick.
4. "Honor Is All" by Mickey Zucker Reichert.
5. "Easy Pickings" by Douglas Niles.
6. "A Dragon to the Core" by Roger E. Moore.
7. "Dragon Breath" by Nick O'Donohoe.
8. "Fool's Gold" by Jeff Grubb.
9. "Scourge of the Wicked Kendragon" by Janet Pack.
10. "And Baby Makes Three" by Amy Stout.
11. "The First Dragonarmy Bridging Company" by Don Perrin.
12. "The Middle of Nowhere" by Dan Harnden.
13. "Kaz and the Dragon's Children" by Richard A. Knaak.
14. "Into the Light" by Linda P. Baker.
15. "The Best" by Margaret Weis.This is a tale written in first person perspective by man who hire a couple of best adventures, everyone of them in his skill, to kill a dragon.
16. "The Hunt" by Kevin Stein.

== Reviews ==
- Kliatt
