= Kaz the Minotaur =

1990 novel by Richard A. Knaak

- Cover of the first edition
- Author: Richard A. Knaak
- Language: English
- Genre: Fantasy
- Published: 1990
- Publication place: United States
- Media type: Print (Paperback)
- ISBN: 0-7869-3231-7

Kaz the Minotaur is a fantasy novel by American writer Richard A. Knaak, set in the world of Dragonlance, and based on the Dungeons & Dragons role-playing game. It is the first novel in the "Heroes II" series. It was published in paperback in July 1990.

Kaz the Minotaur first appeared in The Legend of Huma. His story is continued in the short story "Kaz and the Dragon's Children" from The Dragons of Krynn and in Land of the Minotaurs.

== Plot summary ==
Kaz the Minotaur is a novel that tells the story of Kaz the minotaur.

== Reviews ==
- Magia i Miecz #59 (November 1998) (Polish)
