= Stormblade =

Stormblade may refer to:

- Stormblade (album), an album by Demoniac
- Stormblade (novel), the second novel in the Heroes trilogy of the Dragonlance novels
- Stormblade (spell), a storm spell in the online game of Wizard101
- Stormblades, an on-rails action game published by Kiloo
