= Son of the Dragon =

Son of the Dragon or variation may refer to:

- Son of the Dragon (audio drama) 2007 audio play featuring the Fifth Doctor
- Son of the Dragon (film) 2008 Hallmark Movie channel telefilm based on "The Thief of Bagdad"
- The Dragon's Son (2004 novel) by Margaret Weis, part of the Dragonvarld trilogy
- The Sons of the Dragon (2017 novella) George R.R. Martin story set in A Song of Ice and Fire (Game of Thrones)

== See also ==
- Nine sons of the dragon, some dragon sons of the Dragon King in Chinese mythology
- Descendants of the Dragon
- Dragon Sun (2001 novel) a story set in the world of Sid Meier's Alpha Centauri
- Sundragon (Pamela Douglas) a Marvel Comics superhero from the Marvel Universe
- Dracula (disambiguation), "Dracula" means 'son of the dragon' in Wallachian Romanian
