= Draconian Measures =

2000 novel by Don Perrin and Margaret Weis

- Draconian Measures book cover
- Authors: Don Perrin; Margaret Weis
- Cover artist: Daniel Horne
- Language: English
- Series: Kang's Regiment/The Chaos War
- Genre: Fantasy
- Publisher: Wizards of the Coast
- Publication date: 2000 (mass market paperback)
- Publication place: United States
- Media type: Print (Paperback)
- Pages: 350+8 (Brief History of Draconians)
- ISBN: 0-7869-1678-8
- OCLC: 45415307
- Preceded by: The Doom Brigade

Draconian Measures is a fantasy novel by American writers Don Perrin and Margaret Weis, based in the Dragonlance fictional fantasy campaign setting, and is the second book of the Kang's Regiment series, or The Chaos War series. It was published in 2000 by Wizards of the Coast.

== Characters ==
- Kang - The Bozak commander of the all-draconian engineering unit the First Dragonarmy Engineers during the War of the Lance.
- Slith - A Sivak who is the second-in-command, as well as Kang's best friend, adviser, and confidant.
- Granak - A giant Sivak who is the standard bearer.
- Gloth - A Bozak troop subcommander in charge of First Squadron. He has served with Kang and Slith since early in the War of the Lance.
- Cresel - A Baaz draconian placed in charge of the female draconians.
- Huzzad - A female Knight of Takhsis who is Kang's friend.
- Maranta - General Maranta, the arrogant Aurak commander of a fort of Draconians that Kang and his unit encounter while fleeing from a pursuing goblin army.
- Fonrar - A female Bozak draconian who is a child, but the leader of the twenty female draconians.
- Thesik - A female Aurak that is Fonrar's best friend.
- Hanra and Shanra - Two female sivak sisters.
- Riel - a female Baaz draconian who speaks for the other female Baaz

== Summary ==
The book begins with Kang and his force of draconians preparing to ambush an army of goblins which are trying to destroy Kang's force because they have females. After springing the ambush, they find out that the goblins were aware of the ambush, and turned the ambush around on the draconians. Hobgoblins quickly appear, and so Kang tells his main force to retreat, while signaling a support force to cover.

Meanwhile, on a hill a short distance away, the guarded female draconians notice that Kang's force is retreating, and becoming suspicious, they question the male draconians that are guarding them; however, realizing that they are being given an excuse, Fonrar sends in a sivak, Shanra, disguised as a male to discover the truth, since the female sivaks had an ability to blend in with their surroundings.

Later, after Shanra returns, Fonrar and Thesik learn that the Bozaks saw flashes of light in a nearby canyon. Knowing that the males would not believe them, Fonrar and Thesik set out to learn more. After getting closer to the light, Fonrar accidentally trips, which causes the mysterious shapes that caused the light to question them. They are faced with answering, or getting attacked within five seconds, and so, Thesik and Fonrar jump onto a boulder to announce their presence. The moonlight shines off of Thesik's scales, revealing her as an Aurak to the draconians that were the mysterious shapes.

Back at the base, the hobgoblins attack, quickly overwhelming Kang's force. Kang and Slith prepare to make a bold stand when suddenly the hobgoblins retreat in a wild melee. Then, Kang hears giggles behind him, and turning around, sees Thesik, Fonrar, and the sivak sisters, Shanra and Hanra. The females announce that they brought reinforcements, salute (while giggling) him, and introduce Prokel, the subcommander of the Ninth Infantry.

After introductions, Prokel leads Kang and his forces to a "fort", a ramshackle mess, evidenced by the collapsing guard towers. They meet the commander of the fort, General Maranta. Slith recalls a situation during the war against the elves when Slith kills a "pointy-eared female", then "does a dance" as the pointy-ear for the benefit of the troops. Maranta was surveying the camp at that time, and orders the pointy-eared female to be put under arrest. After learning it was Slith, he was given latrine duty for a month. Thankfully, Maranta does not remember any of that. Maranta calls of the commanders into the Bastion, a gigantic extremely well fortified building at the heart of the fort, and then introduces Kang to the rest of the commanders. Noticing that Kang had an Aurak in his forces, he asks why Kang is in command. Kang then reveals the females, creating an enemy out of Maranta because Kang received the "glory" from Takhisis.

Life in the fort continues, until Maranta discovers that the goblin horde did not give up, and are gathering outside the fort to prepare for a siege. Obviously, this strains the relationship between Kang and Maranta. The females are forced to spend their lives within a wooden house, supposedly to protect them from other draconians, and so, begin to get bored. They decide to begin drills to prepare themselves to fight, and so the females ambush a draconian to get a requisition allowing them to get twenty swords from the quartermaster. At this time, Maranta decides to examine the females, and so when Cresel announces to the females that a visitor is coming, the females place a "water barrel drop", intending that it drops on Gloth's head. Unfortunately, when Maranta enters, the water barrel falls on him instead.

Kang is sent to a nearby fort of Knights of Takhisis to ask for help. He learns that the Knights of Takhisis are actually paying the goblins to kill the draconians with the help of an informer, a female knight that he had met before, Huzzad. Huzzad is discovered by the Knights, and so is forced to escape with Kang. They return to the fort, where Maranta wants to torture Huzzad. Kang refuses to give her over, causing Maranta to tell Kang that he can have her for personal uses. Huzzad becomes a friend to the females, and learns about their secret abilities, like Kapak spit, which is like a healing salve, unlike the male Kapaks' poisonous spit. She also manages to persuade Kang to allow the females to parade and march with the males, forcing Kang to rethink whether the females still need to be "babied" anymore.

The siege continues, with the draconians unable to break out. Kang and his forces begins to build an explosive fake dragon that can fly to scare the goblins, but by then is not welcomed by Maranta anymore. About this time, Kang begins to notice that his draconians are disappearing. Events reach a climax when the goblins attack the fort, causing Kang to admit that the females should be treated just like the rest of the males, and so, with the females, and Huzzad, enters the Bastion to search for Slith, one of the missing draconians. He finds out that Maranta has the Heart of Dracart, a magical orb that duplicates draconians by splitting the draconian's soul into hundreds of parts, or hundred of "new" draconians. Discovering that Maranta intends to do this to Slith, he and the females manage to kill Maranta. They attempt to leave the Bastion, but Maranta's personal guards attempts to stop them, with a crossbowman managing to fatally wound Huzzad. The females then become berserker-like by the death of their friend and kill almost all of the guards. Then, after finally exiting the bastion, they find that the goblins have breached the fort. Kang gives the command to release the fake dragon, and Thesik casts an illusion on the dragon to look like a real gold dragon. The dragon flies over the wall, but Kang realizes that the fuse for the explosives have gone out. He crushes the Heart of Dracart in his hand, mangling his hand, but gaining enough magical power to cast a fireball, which causes the dragon to explode, destroying part of the goblin army and the hobgoblin general.

After the siege, Kang and the females conduct a funeral for Huzzad, and with the other draconian troops, heads to Teyr to establish their own draconian city. Kang also retires from being the commander for personal reasons, and the fact that he can not fight well with his mangled hand anymore. He becomes the Governor of Teyr. The author also hints that Kang has fallen in love with Fonrar.

Granak and several other characters from the alter-egos of users on a Dragonlance internet newsgroup.

== See also ==
- Draconian (Dragonlance)
- The Doom Brigade
