= Dragonmaster =

Dragonmaster or Dragon master may refer to:

== People ==
- Kazuo Sakurada (born 1948), who wrestled as "The Dragonmaster"

=== Characters ===
- Richard Dragon, Kung-Fu Master (comics) fictional character, also called "Master Dragon"
- Dragonmaster, a class of fictional character from RPG videogame series Lunar
- Po (Kung Fu Panda) or Dragon Master, a character in Kung Fu Panda

== Literature ==
- "The Dragon Masters" (1962 novella), science fiction work by Jack Vance
- Master of Dragons (2005 novel), fantasy novel by Margaret Weiss
- The Dragonmaster, a novel written by Richard Brightfield
- Dragonmaster Trilogy, a novel trilogy by Chris Bunch

== Games ==
- Dragon Master (1994 videogame), a 1994 fighting arcade game
- Dragonmaster (card game), a variant of Barbu

== See also ==
- Mistress of Dragons (2003 novel), fantasy novel by Margaret Weiss
- Mother of Dragons, Daenerys Targaryen, from "A Song of Ice and Fire" by George R.R. Martin
- Dragon Mother, Longmu (龙母; 龍母), mythological woman who fostered five dragons
- Lord Toruk the Dragonfather, RPG fictional character from Warmachine and Iron Kingdoms
