= The Doom Brigade =

1996 novel by Margaret Weis and Don Perrin

- The Doom Brigade book cover
- Authors: Margaret Weis; Don Perrin
- Cover artist: Larry Elmore
- Language: English
- Series: Kang's Regiment/The Chaos War
- Genre: Fantasy
- Publisher: Wizards of the Coast
- Publication date: November 1996
- Publication place: United States
- Media type: Print (Paperback and Hardback)
- Pages: 344
- ISBN: 0-7869-0785-1
- Followed by: Draconian Measures

The Doom Brigade is a fantasy novel by American writers Margaret Weis and Don Perrin, published by Wizards of the Coast. It is the first book in the Kang's Regiment series/The Chaos War series of the Dragonlance novels, followed by Draconian Measures.

== Plot summary ==
The Doom Brigade chronicles the former First Dragonarmy Engineering Regiment's quest to recover the first female draconians on Krynn after the War of the Lance.

The brigade has left the dragonarmies in search for a new life, and led by Commander Kang, a Bozak, and Subcommander Slith, they have set up a small town in the valleys below the Kharolis Mountains. Unfortunately, their neighbors are hill dwarves in the town of Celebundin, who are not very receptive to the idea of Draconian neighbours.

For the last twenty five years, raids have occurred every couple of weeks, whether the draconians are short on dwarf spirits, or the dwarves are short on other supplies. However, they have grown to respect each other, and so have made a silent pact to only use blunt weapons, so that the victim is only knocked out or stunned.

While en route to raiding the dwarves one day, one of Kang's scouts reports a pair of red dragons on the horizon. Kang, curious, leads his troops to a pass on the outskirts of the Plains of Dust, where he meets Talon Leader Huzzud. Huzzud, a Knight of the Lily, is a talon leader for the Fifth Dragonarmy, which is led by General Ariakan. She proposes that Kang and his regiment join their army to retake Ansalon, but Kang decides to inspect their camp first.

After inspecting the armies' camp and speaking to their commander, Kang realizes that this force does not consist of untamed goblins like in the previous war, but a well-trained and deadly force of knights. He realizes that since draconians cannot breed, it would be better to die fighting then to just slowly fade away. On that note, he signs himself and his regiment up.

Soon after, they are called to assist the dragonarmy in the conquering of Qualinost. Once they arrive, they are ordered to report for latrine duty. Disgusted, Kang's regiment revolts, and returns to their town. On their return, however, they find their village in flames. They slaughter any dwarves that they can find in their village, and nail their bodies to posts.

Meanwhile, four dwarves who regularly make trips to search for riches, Pestle, Mortar, Auger and Selquist discover a map leading to the lost treasures of Neraka while raiding Thorbardin through a secret passage.

Plotting revenge, Kang orders a small group of five draconians, including himself and Slith, to enter the dwarven town to find out who burned down their village. Slith and the other three shape shift into dwarven guards, while Kang turns invisible. However, when the dwarves discover one of the draconians, the five beat a hasty retreat. Slith managed to steal a book with the map secreted within it from Selquist before they retreated; however, Selquist now pursues the draconians. After he catches Kang, he drives a knife into Kang's leg, temporarily crippling him. The dwarf and the draconians squabble over the book, ending up with the dwarf regaining the book, but the draconians keeping the cover, which has the map hidden inside it. The draconians retreat into their camp, unbeknownst to the fact they have the map to the Nerakan treasures.

A few days later, Selquist appears at the draconian camp, begging Kang to remove a curse which he believes has been put on him. Kang does so after being told that the map leads to unhatched draconian females. Knowing that "rescuing" the females is the only way to continue their own race, Kang and twenty-four other draconians set out to retrieve the eggs. Unfortunately, the four dwarves decide to destroy the eggs and steal the treasure. Joined by a retinue from Moorthane, the dwarven war chief, and twenty guards, the dwarves set out.

For many days and nights, Kang's regiment follow the dwarves. Just before entering Thorbardin, however, Kang is visited by Huzzud, who warns him that the Dark Queen wishes him to complete some great task before he gains the eggs. Unable to be told more, Kang leaves Huzzud.

After traveling for a long while in the tunnels of Thorbardin, the dwarves stumble upon a grell. Grells are large, green octopus-like creatures that float above the ground who live underground. Unfortunately, this one has a wand of The Dark Queen. After a long battle, the draconians join in, slaying the grell and taking the wand. Later, just before reaching their goal, they stumble on a lair of rock and molten lava. Out of the lava rises a massive fire dragon, made out of chaos, which if unstopped, would destroy all of Krynn. Kang realizes that this was the grand test that he had been assigned, and orders his regiment back. Kang almost dies battling the dragon, until he uses the wand to create water to cool himself and solidify the creature. He then creates mud to bury it, gaining himself and his regiment precious time; unfortunately, there's actually an entire nest. While the draconians (who join Kang) are battling the dragons, the dwarves move into the treasure room. After losing a good number of men to the dragons, Kang realizes the only way to defeat them. He orders his regiment back, and commands the wand to cause the stalagmites from the roof to fall into the nest. The wand obeys, and Kang rushes for the exit. He barely makes it, but weak and injured, he falls unconscious. After waking, he discovers he's trapped, until he hears Slith's voice through the rocks. Heartened, the draconians dig through the rocks to rescue Kang. It is then they realize that they are only 100 odd meters away from the eggs.

After realizing this, they rush forward, only to find the dwarves about to kill the young. After negotiating, they reach an agreement. Kang's regiment shows the dwarves the way out of Thorbardin and the draconians keep the young and move out of the valley. The novel ends with Selquist, too injured carry his treasure, bargaining with Gloth ( a draconian subcommander ), over a map to an abandoned city just south of Nordmaar.
