= Star of the Guardians (collectible card game) =

Collectible card game

Card back to the CCG game

Star of the Guardians is a collectible card game based on the Star of the Guardians novel series, and was published by Mag Force 7 in 1995.

== Gameplay ==
Star of the Guardians is a science fiction collectible card game.

== Reception ==
M. Craig Stockwell reviewed Star of the Guardians for Pyramid magazine and stated that "In the ever-burgeoning field of trading card games, consumers have developed higher standards by which to judge new products. Mag Force 7's premiere offering, Star of the Guardians, earns high marks in most every category."

== Reviews ==
- Dragon #218
