= The Inheritance (novel) =

2001 novel by Nancy Varian Berberick

- The Inheritance book cover
- Author: Nancy Varian Berberick
- Cover artist: Bradley Williams
- Language: English
- Series: Dragonlance
- Genre: Fantasy novel
- Publisher: Wizards of the Coast
- Publication date: May, 2001 (mass market paperback)
- Publication place: United States
- Media type: Print (Paperback)
- Pages: 308 pp
- ISBN: 0-7869-1861-6
- OCLC: 46851603

The Inheritance is a fantasy novel, set in the Dragonlance campaign setting of the Dungeons & Dragons fantasy role-playing game. It is part of the Classics series.

== Plot introduction ==
The setting is Qualinost, Pax Tharkas, and the borderlands between Qualinost and Thobardin.

== Plot summary ==
The book begins with Elansa Sungold going to the border to heal a group of trees with her Blue Phoenix, a magical artifact passed down since the Age of Dreams to woodshapers in her family. The Blue Phoenix is a symbol of Habbakuk, and the artifact may be a holy artifact of Habbakuk. She is guarded by twenty elves. When they reach further into the forest, they are ambushed by goblins, which were hired by human brigands. Elansa is taken for ransom, and one of the guards who were sent to take care of her by her husband, Prince Kethrenan, is mutilated and sent back to Qualinost, the elve's homeland, to inform them of the ransom demand, two cartloads full of the best weapons that the elves have. Elansa is taken to one of the bandits secret hideouts, and is guarded by Char, the dwarf. Brand, the leader of the bandits, also takes Elansa's Blue Phoenix from her. In the hands of a human, it didn't pulse with magic at all, so humans would think it's just a pretty shaped gem. Brand kills the son of Gnash, a hobgoblin, who was sent to assist the ambush, making him an enemy of the goblins. They run from the goblins into many different secret hideouts, then hole up in one for the winter.

In the sprain, Brand's demand for two wagons full of weapons has been acknowledged. Prince Kethrenan, and his cousin, a female warrior, drive the wagons, while other warriors hide in the woods. Their plan is to slaughter the bandits when they come to take the weapons, however, their plans are foiled when goblins, this time enemies of both, appear. Brand and his band get away with Elansa and the two wagons, leaving the elves to "mop up" the goblins. Brand stores the weapons in caches all over the stone lands, so that they won't be discovered. A goblin "turncoat" decides to help the elves, and with his help the locate all of the weapon caches. The weapons that can't be recovered due to transportation issues are destroyed. By plotting the caches on a map, the elves discover an arrow pointing to Pax Tharkas, perhaps the last safe house for the brigands, so the elves head to Pax Tharkas. Brand and his band know that they are being hunted, but not by whom, so they decide to go to the abandoned Pax Tharkas as a safe haven.

During this time, Char becomes almost a friend of Elansa's. Many of the men in the group of bandits want Elansa, so Brand gives her a choice between him and them. He was just doing this to protect her, but she didn't know that. Elansa chooses Brand. The goblins amass an army and also head to Pax Tharkas, following Brand. Brand and his followers arrive in Pax Tharkas, and a couple of goblins manage to rouse the undead guarding Kith-Kanan. While Elansa is trying to help the Bandits to destroy the undead, one of the bandits tries to rape her, but Char saves her. Elansa uses her Blue Phoenix to destroy the undead, but she faints from the strain afterwards. The elves and goblins fight outside Pax Tharkas, and the elves destroy the goblins. Prince Kethrenan's cousin is killed. Prince Kethrenan comes in to rescue Elansa, but Elansa wants him to spare Brand. He refuses, kills Brand, and at the same time Leyerlain Starwing kills Kethrenan by throwing a dagger into his neck. At this point, Elansa realizes that she grew to love Brand. Elansa runs away with Char, before the elves come to investigate. She's pregnant with Brand's child, and Char convinces her to claim that she was raped to protect herself and the child, even though Brand grew, almost, to be her lover. She returns to Qualinesti. The child is known as Tanis Half-Elven.

== Characters ==
- Brand - A human mercenary fallen on hard times who leads a band of other bandits.
- Elansa Sungold - An elven woodshaper with a magical artifact, the Blue Phoenix, who is the wife of Prince Kethrenan.
- Prince Kethrenan - Elansa's husband.
- Gnash - A hobgoblin with a wizard's fireball staff who is an enemy of Brand.
- Char - A mountain dwarf who is a member of Brand's band, and a friend to Elansa.
- Leyerlain Starwing - A dark elf who is a member of Brand's band.
