= The Lioness (novel) =

2002 novel by Nancy Varian Berberick

- First edition cover
- Author: Nancy Varian Berberick
- Language: English
- Series: Dragonlance: The Age of Mortals
- Genre: Fantasy novel
- Publisher: Wizards of the Coast
- Publication date: June 1, 2002
- Publication place: United States
- Media type: Print (Paperback)
- Pages: 320 pp
- ISBN: 0-7869-2752-6
- OCLC: 50296355
- LC Class: CPB Box no. 2067 vol. 11
- Preceded by: Conundrum
- Followed by: Dark Thane

The Lioness is the second fantasy novel in The Age of Mortals series set in the Dragonlance Dungeons & Dragons world. It was written by Nancy Varian Berberick.

== Plot introduction ==
The evil green dragon Beryl oppresses the kingdom of Qualinesti with the aid of her Dark Knights. A resistance leader, a mysterious Kagonesti woman who is known as 'The Lioness' arises to battle her.

== Reception ==
In a positive review, critic Don D'Ammassa wrote that it is a "nicely paced and generally satisfying adventure story".
