= The Knights of the Black Earth =

The Knights of the Black Earth is a 1995 novel written by Don Perrin and Margaret Weis.

== Plot summary ==
The Knights of the Black Earth is a novel in which cyborg mercenary Xris is gunning for revenge. Betrayed by his former friend Dalin Rowan—who sold out to an alien race and caused an ambush that killed a colleague and left Xris critically wounded—he is determined to settle the score. Rowan, who underwent a sex change to stay hidden, becomes the target of Xris and his squad, though their mission is complicated by the intervention of the sinister Knights of the Black Earth.

== Reception ==
Paul Pettengale reviewed The Knights of the Black Earth for Arcane magazine, rating it a 6 out of 10 overall, and stated that "The occasionally decent writing and the many cliff-hangers keep you reading, even though you know that the ending is predictable (which it isn’t) and the characters cardboard cutouts at best. If you indulge, expect to be entertained, though rarely impressed."

== Reviews ==
- Kirkus
- Review by Paul Beardsley (1995) in SFX, #4
- Review by Moshe Feder (1995) in Asimov's Science Fiction, December 1995
- Review by Alan Fraser (1996) in Vector 190
