= Jeff Crook =

American writer

Jeff Crook is an American novelist, author, and former technical writer for the United States Postal Service.

== Works ==
Jeff Crook's first Dragonlance novel, The Rose and the Skull, was published in March 1999. His other novels for the Dragonlance setting include The Thieves' Guild (2000), Conundrum (2001), and Dark Thane (2003). One of Crook's stories was also included in the 2000 Dragonlance anthology, Rebels and Tyrants. His story, "The Fractal," appeared in Relics and Omens, his poetry in "The Final Word," and his AD&D adventures in Dungeon Magazine. He was later the editor of Campaigns, the newsletter for the Southern Realms region of the RPGA. He has also had short stories published in the anthology The Search for Magic: Tales from the War of Souls (2001), and co-authored Bertrem's Guide to the War of Souls, Volume One (2001).

Crook also wrote short stories for the Sovereign Stone world setting.

Crook co-designed the Dungeons & Dragons sourcebook, Champions of Ruin, published in 2005 for the Forgotten Realms setting.

Crook also wrote a paranormal murder mystery set in Memphis, Tennessee called The Sleeping and the Dead, which centers on the life of a former police detective named Jackie Lyons who has the ability to see the dead.
