= Nancy Varian Berberick =

American fantasy author

- Born: July 23, 1951 (age 75)
- Occupation: Fantasy novelist
- Writing career
- Genre: fantasy

Nancy Varian Berberick (born July 23, 1951) is an American fantasy author who has written 12 novels, mainly for the Dragonlance series of Dungeons & Dragons novels as well as a number of short stories.

== Bibliography ==
=== Dragonlance ===
==== Novels ====
- Berberick, Nancy Varian (April 1988). Stormblade. United States: Wizards of the Coast. ISBN 0-7869-3149-3.
- Berberick, Nancy Varian; Linda P. Baker (October 1998). Tears of the Night Sky. United States: Wizards of the Coast. ISBN 0-7869-1185-9.
- Berberick, Nancy Varian (January 2000). Dalamar the Dark. United States: Wizards of the Coast. ISBN 0-7869-1565-X.
- Berberick, Nancy Varian; Stan Brown; Thompson, Paul B. (October 2000). Bertrem's Guide to the Age of Mortals. United States: Wizards of the Coast. ISBN 0-7869-1437-8.
- Berberick, Nancy Varian; Crook, Jeff; Grubber, John; Herbert, Mary (September 2001). Bertrem's Guide to the War of Souls, Volume One. United States: Wizards of the Coast. ISBN 0-7869-1882-9.
- Berberick, Nancy Varian (May 2001). The Inheritance. United States: Wizards of the Coast. ISBN 0-7869-1861-6.
- Berberick, Nancy Varian (August 2002). The Lioness. United States: Wizards of the Coast. ISBN 0-7869-1949-3.
- Berberick, Nancy Varian (June 2004). Prisoner of Haven. United States: Wizards of the Coast. ISBN 0-7869-3327-5.

==== Short stories ====
- Berberick, Nancy Varian (February 2005). "Harvests". The Magic of Krynn. United States: Wizards of the Coast. ISBN 0-7869-3593-6.
- Berberick, Nancy Varian (April 2005). "Hearth Cat and Winter Wren". Kender, Gully Dwarves, and Gnomes. United States: Wizards of the Coast. ISBN 0-7869-3634-7.
- Berberick, Nancy Varian (April 2005). "Snowsong". Kender, Gully Dwarves, and Gnomes. United States: Wizards of the Coast. ISBN 0-7869-3634-7.
- Berberick, Nancy Varian (June 2005). "Hide and Go Seek". Love and War. United States: Wizards of the Coast. ISBN 0-7869-3770-X.

=== Non-Dragonlance ===
- Berberick, Nancy Varian (May 1989). The Jewels of Elvish. United States: Wizards of the Coast. ISBN 0-88038-726-2.
- Berberick, Nancy Varian (September 1990). A Child of Elvish. United States: Wildside Press. ISBN 1-58715-174-X.
- Berberick, Nancy Varian (March 1991). Shadow of the Seventh Moon. United States: Ace Books. ISBN 0-441-76055-4.
- Berberick, Nancy Varian (February 1994). The Panther's Hoard. United States: Ace Books. ISBN 0-441-00009-6.
