= Dalamar the Dark =

Fantasy novel by Nancy Varian Berberick

- Cover of the first edition
- Author: Nancy Varian Berberick
- Language: English
- Genre: Fantasy novel
- Published: 2000
- Publication place: United States
- Media type: Print (Paperback)
- ISBN: 0-7869-1565-X

Dalamar the Dark is a fantasy novel by Nancy Varian Berberick, set in the world of Dragonlance, and based on the Dungeons & Dragons role-playing game. It is the second novel in the "Dragonlance Classics" series. It was published in paperback in January 2000.

== Plot summary ==
Dalamar the Dark is a novel that tells the story of Dalamar the elf wizard.
