= Warcraft: The Sunwell Trilogy =

2005–2007 manga series

- Cover of Warcraft: The Sunwell Trilogy, volume 1
- Genre: Fantasy
- Author: Richard Knaak
- Illustrator: Kim Jae-hwan
- Publisher: Zvaigzne ABC (Latvia); Madman Entertainment (Australia and New Zealand); Tokyopop (North America); Algoritam (Croatia); ArtLine (Bulgaria); Delta Vision (Hungary); J-POP Manga (Italy); Comix-ART (Russia); Kasen Comics (Poland); Doğan Egmont (Turkey) Edições Asa (Portugal)
- Original run: 2005–2007
- Volumes: 3

Warcraft: The Sunwell Trilogy is a three-volume original English-language manga written by Richard Knaak, illustrated by Kim Jae-hwan, and published by Tokyopop. The series is based on Blizzard Entertainment's Warcraft universe and follows the adventures of Kalec, a blue dragon who takes the form of a human to investigate a mysterious power, and Anveena, a beautiful young maiden with an enchanting secret.

== Story ==
The series opens with the history of World of Warcraft. A short introduction into the shaping of the universe up to the events leading to the rise of Arthas as the Lich King.

=== Dragon Hunt ===
During the unsteady stalemate between the living and the undead, a young blue dragon flies over what remains of southern Lordaeron. Kalecgos, the blue dragon, is shot down by Harkyn Grymstone, a dragon hunter driven by hatred towards the dragon who killed his family. Before Harkyn and his party find the wounded dragon, Kalec transforms into a human and is saved by Anveena, a young maiden who saw the event.

But the hunter's tracking skills and magical items easily led them to the farm of Anveena's parents. Kalec and Anveena try to escape through a tunnel but are spotted by one of Harkyn's henchmen. Kalec returns to his true form and takes to the skies in an attempt to flee together with Anveena, but he is hit again and crashes into a lake. The hunter pursues the dragon, but the magical artefact steers them north instead of towards the lake.

Anveena finds Kalec again on the shore in human form. After resting they return to Anveena's home. When they see smoke coming from the house they rush over to help but find they are much too late. They suddenly find themselves under attack by undead abominations and ghouls led by Dar'khan, and elven mage and undead commander. Dar'khan surprises them and binds their magics with special neck collars.

Dar'khan tells of his betrayal of his fellow High Elves and his search for the Sunwell. Before Dar'khan can harm them, Kalec and Anveena are saved by Tyrygosa, another blue dragon. Tyri had come to protect her future mate.

In the ruins of her house, Anveena finds a mystic egg. It almost instantly hatches revealing an unknown type of dragon hatchling. Anveena senses the hatchling's name is Raac (or because that is what sound it made). To remove the binds from Kalec and Anveena all four of them travel to Tarren Mill. Tyri disguises herself as an Elf when they arrive at the town. They search for Borel, an old friend of Anveena's parents, but without luck. The magical bind has overexerted Kalec and they decide to rest at the inn. When Kalec wakes up he finds himself looking down the barrel of Harkyn's gun. Before she can help, Tyri is subdued by a magical net. Anveena escapes hoping to find help and runs into Jorad Mace, a human Paladin. He advises against returning to Tarren Mill because the Dwarven hunter is not the only opponent interested in Anveena and her friends.

The hunters and their prey suddenly find themselves surrounded by the Scourge. Dar'khan makes his presence known and informed Harkyn he was hired to keep the dragons away. The Lich King foresaw the blue dragons' curiosity about the faint Sunwell energies and had Dar'khan mislead Harkyn into killing any dragon who would come close. Anveena returns before the dragons can be harmed offering to help in exchange for their lives. Dar'khan senses the power of the Sunwell in Raac and offers a trade. When Kalec objects, Dar'khan orders the dragon to be killed. Realizing that he has been tricked, Harkyn takes his gun to Dar'khan instead. While the hunters and Kalec fight Dar'khan and his undead, Jorad frees Tyri who swiftly burns the enemy to cinders. The next morning the entire group decides to head for Aerie Peak in search for Borel and Loggi, a Dwarven smith and a cousin of Harkyn's. Harkyn told them the magical neck-rings looked like Dwarven work, and Loggi might be able to remove them.

=== Shadows of Ice ===
In the next book in the series, it tells of the story of the group's adventures in the Alterac Mountains.

At first, Tyri is flying Jorad Mace, Kalec, and Anveena to Aerie Peak, where Loggi Grymstone is, but are attacked and grounded by an undead FrostWyrm somewhere in the Alterac Mountains. Anveena comes to in a small room inside a castle, where she meets the global adventurer Trag Highmountain, a Tauren, who helps her recover. Anveena immediately tries to leave to find her comrades, but Trag convinces her to stay after explaining there are Undead in the mountains led by Ichor, an undead commander. She then meets Baron Valimar Mordis, a friend of Trag's, even though the Baron is a rebel Undead. Still, he looks very much like a human besides several scars, including a missing eye. The Baron explains that he was an enemy of Ichor and was trying to find a way to combat him. He then tells his story, explaining he was the lord of a distant kingdom that was ravaged by the undead. He was then raised from death and forced to join the undead ranks. He eventually broke away from them, and Trag, who had previously come to the kingdom as a messenger, found him and helped him recover. After he finishes, he tricks her into giving him some unknown power stored inside her. To do this, he uses an Orb of Ner'zhul, a powerful undead artifact, to use her to raise an army of his own. While being entranced by the Orb, he tells of his true intentions; his goal was to use her all along to raise his army to destroy both the undead and the living, even Trag. He also reveals he controls the Frost Wyrm, not Ichor, and he had planned this the minute they had entered Alterac.

Meanwhile, Kalec finds himself with Raac in a crevasse, so he finds a cave to stay in. Inside the cave, he finds a Dwarven team digging away ice from a giant elephant-like monster. Some dwarves knock him out and bind him, and Trag takes him away to the castle as a prisoner, but promises to secretly help. To try to stop the Baron, Trag disrupts the spell he is casting by telling of a massive army heading his way. After the Baron leaves, Trag wakes Anveena and directs her to Kalec. Later, the Baron learns Trag was lying and attacks him, knocking him out.

When Jorad wakes up, he is trapped in a block of ice. Powered by a mysterious voice, he breaks free and then frees Tyri, also trapped. Some undead led by Ichor find them and capture them when they get out of the cave they were in. While taken prisoner, they find Loggi Grymstone in the undead group. He explains that he and some other dwarves came there to obtain resources needed to fight against the undead, but instead found the Baron Mordis, whom they worked for with promises of defeating the undead in Alterac. Tyri and Jorad then tell him why they are in the mountains. While being imprisoned, Loggi signals some other dwarves that the undead are near. The dwarves then counterattack, and are joined by Anveena and Kalec, but the Baron spots them from the castle and sends the FrostWyrm against them. Tyri transforms into a dragon and combats the Wyrm, but the Baron begins his spell, once again entrancing Anveena and raising his new army. The spell is then stopped when Trag overpowers the Baron and stops the spell, which destroys the FrostWyrm. The massive Wyrm skeleton crashes on the castle, presumably killing both of them. On the ground, Tyri, Jorad, and the dwarves achieve victory, but Dar'khan shows up, eviscerates Loggi, and kidnaps Anveena in front of their eyes, ending the book.

=== Ghostlands ===
In the final book of the series, Dar'khan flies Anveena over to the ruins of Quel'thalas (the elven homeland), and the four heroes try to stop him. A band of exiled elves led by Lor'themar, a former ranger-captain, try to reclaim Quel'thalas by ambushing lone groups of undead. Meanwhile, Kalecgos, Tyrygosa, Jorad Mace and their juvenile dragon Raac are trying to find out what is going on. Along the way, they are ambushed by a felhound, a large, vicious, magic-eating monster. They are initially unable to stop it, but a distant figure lets out a horrid screech that temporarily stops the Felhound's magic, allowing Kalec to finish it off. They are then confronted by Lor'themar's group, and they band together to try to stop Dar'khan. Meanwhile, Dar'khan takes Anveena to the former sight of SunwelI the source of elven magic, which was destroyed by the undead. Along the way, he explains why he is taking her there, but in his monologue, Anveena slips off. She is then confronted by a mysterious cloaked figure, who tries to tell her that she was the essence of the Sunwell itself. Anveena doesn't believe him, and soon Dar'khan finds her again. Dar'khan then finds the figure that stopped the Felhound, who proves to be Sylvanas Windrunner, former general of elven forces. She tries to kill him, blaming him for the destruction of her homeland, but he tricks her and takes her prisoner. He then goes to the former site of the Sunwell where he prepares to cast his spell on Anveena, but Lor'themar and his elves attack. They are driven back, but delay him momentarily. Kalec, Tyri, and Jorad then arrive and try to stop Dar'khan. He restrains Kalec with the magical neck collar he put around him in the first book. Tyri is delayed by a massive dragon controlled by Dar'khan, and the hopes of victory look bleak. Raac frees the dragon from Dar'khan's control and they all manage to stop Dar'khan. After he is defeated, the giant dragon is transformed into the cloaked figure Anveena spoke to earlier. He is revealed as Borel, whose real name is Korialstrasz, the consort of Alexstrasza the Life-Binder. At the end, Tyri flies Jorad to confront Arthas, Lord of the Undead Scourge, and Anveena stays in Quel'thalas with Kalec and Lor'themar to hide her power.

== See also ==
- Warcraft universe
