= Dark Thane =

2003 novel by Jeff Crook

- First edition cover
- Author: Jeff Crook
- Cover artist: Matt Stawicki
- Language: English
- Series: Dragonlance: The Age of Mortals
- Genre: Fantasy
- Publisher: Wizards of the Coast
- Publication date: November 2003
- Publication place: United States
- Media type: Print (Paperback)
- Pages: 320 pp
- ISBN: 0-7869-2941-3
- OCLC: 53309742
- LC Class: CPB Box no. 2280 vol. 8
- Preceded by: The Lioness (2002)
- Followed by: Prisoner of Haven (2004)

Dark Thane is a fantasy novel in the setting of Dragonlance, based on the campaign setting for the Dungeons & Dragons fantasy role-playing game. It was written by Jeff Crook. It is volume three of the six volume book series The Age of Mortals. It is set in the year 422 AC (After Cataclysm), also known as 39 SC (Second Cataclysm).

== Plot introduction ==
After a series of ugly battles and incidents, the dwarven community becomes increasingly isolationist in its city under the mountains. Unfortunately dark magic, backstabbings, betrayal and power grabs threaten to destroy the already destabilized dwarf society.

=== Explanation of the novel's title ===
A Thane is a ruler of a dwarven faction.

== Characters in "Dark Thane" ==
- Tarn Bellowgranite
- Mog Bonecutter
- Crystal Heathstone
- Zen
- Ferro Dunskull
- Glint Ettinhammer
- Tor Bellowgranite

== Release details ==
- 2003, USA. Wizards of the Coast, (ISBN 0-7869-2941-3), Pub date November 2003, Paperback
