= Prisoner of Haven =

2004 novel by Nancy Varian Berberick

- First edition cover
- Author: Nancy Varian Berberick
- Cover artist: Matt Stawicki
- Language: English
- Series: The Age of Mortals
- Genre: Fantasy novel
- Publisher: Wizards of the Coast
- Publication date: June 1, 2004
- Publication place: United States
- Media type: Print (Paperback)
- Pages: 320 pp
- ISBN: 0-7869-3327-5
- OCLC: 55531240
- LC Class: CPB Box no. 2280 vol. 9
- Preceded by: Dark Thane (2003)
- Followed by: Wizards' Conclave (2004)

Prisoner of Haven is a fantasy novel set in the world of Dragonlance. It was written by Nancy Varian Berberick, published in 2004. It is volume four of the six volume book series The Age of Mortals. It is set in the year 421 AC (After Cataclysm), also known as 38 SC (Second Cataclysm).

== Plot summary ==
The book follows the adventures of sisters-in-law Dezra and Usha Majere as they are trapped in the Krynn city of Haven by a Dark Knight of Neraka and his army. The story takes place during the War of Souls.

== Characters in "Prisoner of Haven" ==
- Usha Majere
- Dezra Majere
- The Qui'thonas

== Release details ==
2004, USA, Wizards of the Coast ISBN 0-7869-3327-5, Pub date 1 June 2004, Paperback

== Reception ==
In a positive review, critic Don D'Ammassa praised the novel's "unusually strongly drawn characters."

== Reviews ==
- SF Site
