= List of Diablo novels =

The popularity of the Diablo video game series led to several novels published that are set in Diablo's shared universe.

== Novels ==
=== Demonsbane ===
Demonsbane (2000, ISBN 0743418999) is an e-novella written by Robert B. Marks. It appears in print in the Diablo Archive (2008, ISBN 9781416576990).

In the book, Siggard, the only survivor of the battle of Blackmarch, unable to remember the battle's final hours—is driven to avenge those slain by the army of darkness. As he hunts the demonic army, Siggard pieces together the truth of that terrible battle...and finds his nightmare is just beginning.

Demonsbane was a book published in the spirit of the "e-book revolution." However, the market for e-books was quite small at the time and despite months of advertising on battle.net, sales were in the hundreds rather than the projected thousands.

Before being written, it was decided that Demonsbane should set the tone for the series, and help establish Sanctuary not only as a living and breathing game world, but also as a living and breathing world in literature. As such, Marks did a lot of world building using flavour quotes at the beginning of each chapter.

=== Legacy of Blood ===
Legacy of Blood (2001, ISBN 067104155X, reissue 2017, ISBN 9781945683015), the first novel based on Diablo by Blizzard Entertainment. The book was written by Richard A. Knaak. Legacy of Blood is intended for mature readers. It uses the same image as the cover of the Diablo II game box. It was collected in the Diablo Archive in 2008.

The book is written about a group of three men who stumble upon enchanted armor of unfathomable, immense powers that they have no clue about. The armor ends up belonging to a past warlord named Bartuc, who was the most brutal of all men to walk the earth, painting his armor each morning with the blood from the battle from his deceased foes. He was a Sorcerer who could control demons and used them to his own power to take over cities and countries in order to fiercely reign over the entire earth. He was eventually killed during an enormous battle by multiple people including his own brother Horazon. The armor was hidden away in a dark dungeon protected with dark magical powers where it sat dormant secretly calling to the main character, Norrec. Norrec was among the three tomb raiders when the armor was discovered. The three men were caught in a dire situation causing Norrec to put on the armor and reawaken the power of legions of demons and hell itself. His life would be forever changed...and one would question whether for the better or not.

=== The Black Road ===
The Black Road (2002, ISBN 0743426916, reissue 2018, ISBN 9781945683121) is a novel by Mel Odom. It was collected in the Diablo Archive in 2008.

=== The Kingdom of Shadow ===
The Kingdom of Shadow (2002, ISBN 0743426924, reissue 2018, ISBN 9781945683169) is a novel by Richard A. Knaak. It was collected in the Diablo Archive in 2008.

=== Moon of the Spider ===
Moon of the Spider (2006, ISBN 0743471326, reissue 2023, ISBN 9781956916171) is the third novel set in the Diablo universe written by Richard A. Knaak.

Driven by nightmares to the ruins of a mysterious tomb, Lord Aldric Jitan hopes to awaken a terrible evil that has slept since the fall of Tristram. Drawn by the growing darkness in the land, the enigmatic Necromancer Zayl, stumbles upon Jitan's plot—unaware that one of his own brethren has set these dire events in motion. Now, as the celestial Moon of the Spider rises, the nefarious demon, Astrogha, prepares to unleash his minions upon the world of Sanctuary.

=== The Sin War ===
The Sin War is a trilogy of novel series set in Blizzard Entertainment's Diablo universe, written by Richard A. Knaak. It tells the story of Uldyssian as he is drawn into the battle between the Temple of the Triune, run by the Primus under Lucion; the Son of Mephisto and the Cathedral of Light run by the rebel angel Inarius. Uldyssian feels that both sides are corrupt and wants nothing to do with either of them. When he is accused of murdering one of their missionaries, he flees his home town of Seram as he begins to discover his own strange powers. He decides to teach others how to use it, and gathers many followers to him, but the Temple and the Cathedral want his powers for their own and will stop at nothing to get them.

- Birthright (2006, ISBN 0743471229, reissue 2019, ISBN 9781945683473)
- Scales of the Serpent (2007, ISBN 0743471237, reissue 2019, ISBN 9781945683596)
- The Veiled Prophet (2007, ISBN 0743471245, reissue 2020, ISBN 9781950366125)

This trilogy was done as a collaboration between Knaak and Chris Metzen (Blizzard), so it is considered canon material in the Diablo universe.

=== The Order ===
The Order (2012, ISBN 9781416550785, paperback 2013, ISBN 9781451645651, reissue 2021, ISBN 9781950366514) is a novel by Nate Kenyon.

=== Heroes Rise, Darkness Falls ===
Heroes Rise, Darkness Falls (2012, ISBN 9781416550907) is an anthology by Micky Neilson, James Waugh, Cameron Dayton, Matt Burns, Michael Chu, and Erik Sabol.

=== Storm of Light ===
Storm of Light (2014, ISBN 9781416550808) is a novel by Nate Kenyon.

=== Morbed ===
Morbed (2014, ISBN 9781476789460) is an e-novella by Micky Neilson.

=== Tales from the Horadric Library ===
Tales from the Horadric Library (2022, ISBN 9781803361659) is an anthology by Justin Parker, Matthew J. Kirby, Tamsyn Muir, Courtney Alameda, Adam Foshko, Barry Lyga, Delilah S. Dawson, and Catherynne M. Valente.

=== Shadows of Sanctuary ===
Shadows of Sanctuary (2025, ISBN 9781835414415) is an anthology by Alma Katsu, Jonathan Maberry, Z Brewer, Ryan Quinn, and Carly Anne West.

=== The Lost Horadrim ===
The Lost Horadrim (2026, ISBN 9780425284896) is a novel by Matthew J. Kirby.

== Books and comic books ==
=== Tales of Sanctuary ===
Tales of Sanctuary (2001, ISBN 156971682X) is a comic book by Francisco Ruiz Velasco, Dave Land, and Phil Amara, published by Dark Horse Comics.

=== Book of Cain ===
Book of Cain (2011, ISBN 9781608870639, paperback 2016, ISBN 9781608878024) is a book with text by Flint Dille and art direction by Glenn Rane, Doug Gregory, and Jeremy Cranford. It was the first product based on Diablo III by Blizzard Entertainment.

During the 2011 San Diego Comic-Con, Blizzard Entertainment senior vice-president of Creative Design Chris Metzen revealed further details about Book of Cain.

=== Sword of Justice ===
Sword of Justice (2012, reissue 2021, ISBN 9781950366446) is a comic book series by Aaron Williams and Joseph Lacroix, originally published by DC Comics.

=== Book of Tyrael ===
Book of Tyrael (2013, ISBN 9781608872794, paperback 2016, ISBN 9781608878031) is a book by Matt Burns and Doug Alexander.

=== Book of Adria ===
Book of Adria (2018, ISBN 9781945683206) is a book by Robert Brooks and Matt Burns.

=== Book of Lorath ===
Book of Lorath (2023, ISBN 9781956916140) is a book by Matthew J. Kirby.

=== Legends of the Barbarian: Bul-Kathos ===
Legends of the Barbarian: Bul-Kathos (2023, ISBN 9781950366965) is a graphic novel by John Arcudi and Geraldo Borges.

=== Horadric Vault: The Complete Collection ===
Horadric Vault: The Complete Collection (2023, ISBN 9781956916409) is a collection of Book of Cain, Book of Tyrael, Book of Adria, and Book of Lorath.

=== Legends of the Necromancer: Rathma ===
Legends of the Necromancer: Rathma (2024, ISBN 9781956916270) is a graphic novel by Fred Kennedy and Adam Gorham.

=== Book of Prava ===
Book of Prava (2024, ISBN 9781956916522) is a book by Matthew J. Kirby.

=== Diablo: Dawn of Hatred ===
Diablo: Dawn of Hatred (2026, ISBN 9781785865893) is a graphic novel by Cullen Bunn and Daniele Serra.
