= Wing Commander Collectible Trading Card Game =

Collectible card game

Wing Commander: Collectible Card Game
- Kilrathi card back to the Wing Commander CCG.
- Designers: Jeff Grubb and Don Perrin
- Publishers: Mag Force 7
- Players: 2
- Playing time: approx 10 min.
- Chance: Some
- Skills: Card playing arithmetics

The Wing Commander Collectible Trading Card Game is a collectible card game based on the Wing Commander video games by Chris Roberts, published by Mag Force 7.

== Development ==
Wing Commander Collectible Trading Card Game was designed by Don Perrin.

== Reviews ==
- Inquest Gamer #9
- The Duelist #8
