= Sovereign Press =

Sovereign Press, Incorporated was a publisher and distributor of role-playing games based in Lake Geneva, Wisconsin. It was founded in 1998 by Margaret Weis and Don Perrin and is one of two companies that Weis owns.

== Games produced ==
Sovereign Press released the Sovereign Stone role-playing game, based on the Sovereign Stone novels, by Larry Elmore and Don Perrin and had the license from Wizards of the Coast to release new Dragonlance role-playing products. The publishing of fiction set in the Dragonlance milieu is still handled by Wizards of the Coast.

Products produced for Dragonlance were:

- Age of Mortals: Dragonlance Campaign Setting Companion
- Dragonlance Dungeon Master's Screen
- Key of Destiny: Dragonlance Age of Mortals Campaign, Vol. I
- Bestiary of Krynn
- Towers of High Sorcery: A Dragonlance d20 System Supplement
- War of the Lance: Dragonlance Campaign Setting Supplement
- Tasslehoff's Map Pouch: The Age of Mortals
- Spectre of Sorrows: Age of Mortals Campaign, Volume II
- Holy Orders of the Stars
- Dragonlance Starter Pack
- Legends of the Twins: Dragonlance Campaign Setting Companion
- Tasslehoff's Map Pouch: The War of the Lance
- Knightly Orders of Ansalon
- Dragons of Autumn: War of the Lance Chronicles, Volume I
- Price of Courage: Age of Mortals Campaign, Volume III
- Bestiary of Krynn (Revised)
- Tasslehoff's Map Pouch: Legends
- Races of Ansalon
- Dragons of Krynn
- Dragons of Winter: War of the Lance Chronicles, Volume II
- Lost Leaves From the Inn of the Last Home
- Dragons of Spring: War of the Lance Chronicles, Vol. 3

Under the Sovereign Stone imprint, Sovereign Press produced ten books and all save one were using the d20 system.

== After the founding of Margaret Weis Productions ==
In 2004, after Margaret Weis and Don Perrin divorced, Margaret Weis founded Margaret Weis Productions which used the Sovereign Stone system as the basis for the Cortex System and the Serenity RPG. The Sovereign Stone website was deleted at the end of July 2004. In early 2008 the rights to Dragonlance reverted to Wizards of the Coast with the final book in the line, Dragons of Spring, being produced in January 2008. The Sovereign Press website closed down at the end of 2008 with dragonlance.com not being updated after June 2009 and being taken down in early 2011.
