= The Legend of Huma =

1988 fantasy novel

- Cover of the first edition
- Author: Richard A. Knaak
- Cover artist: Jeff Easley
- Language: English
- Series: Dragonlance Heroes
- Genre: Fantasy
- Publisher: TSR, Inc.
- Publication date: 1988
- Publication place: United States
- Media type: Print (Paperback)
- Pages: 384
- ISBN: 0-88038-548-0
- OCLC: 17937960
- Dewey Decimal: 813/.54 19
- LC Class: PS3561.N25 L4 1988
- Followed by: Kaz the Minotaur

The Legend of Huma is a fantasy novel by American writer Richard A. Knaak, the first in the Heroes Sextet of Dragonlance novels. It was based on characters and settings from Margaret Weis and Tracy Hickman's Dragonlance Chronicles series. Published in 1988, it was the first Dragonlance book not dealing with the original companions.

== Plot summary ==
The book narrates the adventures of Huma Dragonbane, a Knight of the Crown, his meeting with Kaz the Minotaur, the discovering of the dragonlances, and the defeat of Takhisis during the Third Dragon Wars.

Huma and the rest of his unit patrol through a desolate village. Huma's commander, Rennard, orders the investigation of the nearby woods due to a rumor of goblin activity. During the ensuing confrontation Huma is separated from his unit. While searching for his comrades he comes across goblins tormenting a captive, the minotaur Kaz. After saving Kaz, Huma strikes up an unlikely friendship with the minotaur and later with a silver dragon before being reunited with the Knights.

Once back at headquarters, they encounter a battle between the forces of Paladine and the forces of Takhisis. Huma is struck in the battle and loses consciousness. He awakens in an infirmary being tended by a woman who introduces herself as Gwyneth. Huma is appointed captain of the watch, and encounters his old friend, Magius, a powerful magic user.

Magius tells Huma to trust him, but has to leave while Huma returns to the knights' encampment. The knights are engulfed in a battle with the forces of Takhisis and Huma and Kaz are thrown into a magical darkness. Magius leads Huma and Kaz through the battle to his Citadel, but later prevents them from leaving. Magius tells Huma that he is a renegade mage that took the test in the Tower of High Sorcery.

The Citadel is discovered by Galan Dracos and comes under attack by the forces of Takhisis. Magius tells Huma that a mountain represented by a tapestry in the Citadel is important and that Huma should journey into Ergoth toward this mountain. Huma and Kaz flee the Citadel.

Huma and Kaz are separated. Huma fights off dreadwolves and warriors and becomes lost in the forests of Ergoth. He is helped by an Ergothian commander who brings him to the Ergothian camp. The Ergothians tell Huma that the lands around Ergoth have been ravaged by the plague. While the camp is traveling Huma comes upon a ruins of a town and is captured by servants of Morgion. The Ergothians rescue Huma who then encounters Magius, and the two escape into the night.

Magius and Huma come across the knight Bouron who is attached to an outpost of the Knights of Solamnia. Bouron and his commander Taggin welcome Huma. Taggin captures Kaz and puts him on trial. Taggin releases Kaz to Huma and allows Huma to continue on his journey to the mountains accompanied by a retinue of knights.

Magius, Kaz and Huma traverse the paths in the mountains and Huma is separated from the others. Huma is led to a temple built into the side of the mountain and encounters Gwyneth. Gwyneth tells Huma that he will face challenges before he can claim the prize that he has come for. Huma enters the mountain and faces Wyrmfather, an ancient, serpentine dragon. Huma hides in Wyrmfather's treasure room, discovering an evil magical sword called the Sword of Tears. Huma kills Wyrmfather with the Sword of Tears and is teleported through a magical mirror in the treasure room to Solamnia.

Huma returns to Vingaard Keep to find that the head of the Knights, Grand Master Trake, has died. Huma is to attend a meeting that will determine whether Bennett, Trake's nephew, or Lord Oswald, the High Warrior and Huma's mentor, will become the next Grand Master. During the meeting Rennard tells everyone that Oswald has become mysteriously ill. At night Huma discovers the guards near Lord Oswald have been put into a magical sleep, then encounters Rennard dressed as a servant of Morgion, trying to poison Lord Oswald. Huma and Rennard fight, but Rennard escapes. Lord Oswald thanks Huma for his help and sends him back to the mountains of Ergoth. Huma encounters Rennard inciting villagers to violence. The two fight until Rennard is mortally wounded. Huma is then teleported back to Wyrmfather's treasure room.

Huma finds the Sword of Tears, lying among the treasure. He takes it with him and looks for an exit from the mountain. Huma encounters Gilean, a grey-clad mystic, who tells him to leave the sword behind. Huma struggles for control as the sword tries to dominate his mind; he eventually prevails, discarding the sword. Huma is granted access to the workshop of Duncan Ironweaver.

Duncan tells Huma that he is the creator of the Dragonlance and allows him to pass into a room where Huma has a vision of the knightly, benevolent god Paladine, on a platinum dragon. Paladine hands Huma the Dragonlance.

Huma exits the chamber and finds Gwyneth, who tells him that Kaz and Magius are nearby. Huma finds Kaz and Magius and with the help of a silver dragon that Gwyneth sent for, they are able to prepare the lances for transport to Vingaard Keep.

En route to Vingaard the group is attacked by Crynus and Char. Huma and the silver dragon kill Char, and Crynus is defeated with the help of Kaz and the silver dragon. Warriors of Takhisis attempt to steal the lances, but are prevented from doing so by Kaz. Magius is captured and taken back to Galan Dracos.

Huma rejoins the knights to find that there are many Dragonlances already there. He finds Duncan Ironweaver, who tells him he had many. Many good dragons show up and are fitted with the new lances, and go into battle against the evil dragons of Takhisis.

== Background ==
Author Richard Knaak wrote The Legend of Huma so that it followed the Dungeons & Dragons game rules. According to the Guide to Literary Masters & Their Works, "Knaak's novel proved to be more successful than the game." The novel is a prequel to the original Dragonlance trilogy, Chronicles by Weis and Hickman, and is based on the legend mentioned in those books of the first person to discover the mythical Dragonlances. Knaak said that an overarching theme of his books is "one should never give up."

This novel introduces the character of Kaz the minotaur. The novel expands on elements from earlier short stories, and makes an effort to treat minotaurs as characters rather than monsters.

== Reception ==
On May 22, 1988, The Legend of Huma became a New York Times Best Seller.

In the Io9 series revisiting older Dungeons & Dragons novels, Rob Bricken commented that "The Legend of Huma rolls an 8 on the ol' 1d20, although as I type that I wonder if I'm overvaluing it a little because the back half seemed so good compared to the first part."

The Legend of Huma appeared on the 2024 Game Rant "31 Best Dungeons & Dragons Novels, Ranked" list at #8.

== Reviews ==
- Magia i Miecz #29 (May 1996) (Polish)
