= Stormblade (novel) =

1988 novel by Nancy Varian Berberick

- Cover of the first edition
- Author: Nancy Varian Berberick
- Language: English
- Genre: Fantasy novel
- Publisher: TSR, Inc.
- Publication date: 1988
- Publication place: United States
- Media type: Print (Paperback)

Stormblade is the second novel in the Heroes trilogy of the Dragonlance novels. It was written in 1988 by Nancy Varian Berberick who also wrote many short Dragonlance stories for Dragon magazine.

== Synopsis ==
Stormblade is a novel that tells a part of the history of the Dragonlance world.

== Plot summary ==
Stormblade is a novel that chronicles Stanach the dwarf's quest to retrieve the powerful Stormblade. Stormblade is a kingsword: a blade intended to break the deadlock among the council of thanes and bring a new king to Thorbardin. This blade is stolen, but when it turns up, one dwarf is brave enough to go after it.

Stanach was an orphan who grew up like any other dwarf but was lucky enough to be taught the basics of smithing. Without the blade, his teacher becomes depressed, and eventually mad. Stanach sets out to find the blade for his teacher and to restore it.

Firstly, he meets Lavim, a kender. Together they travel, eventually being joined by the human Kelida and the elf ranger Tyorl. After many wrong turns, fights, and misfortunes, they make it back to Thorbardin, where the Theiwar thane is attempting to murder Hornfel, the Hylar thane to gain power over the thanes so he can rule.

After a long fight, the Theiwar thane is killed and Stormblade is restored to its rightful place. Tyorl is mortally wounded in the fight. As a mark of honor, they allow him to be buried in the Garden of Thanes (a great honor for dwarves, and even moreso for an elf).

== See also ==
- List of Dragonlance novels
