= Star of the Guardians =

Series of four novels by Margaret Weis

Star of the Guardians is a series of four science fiction and space opera novels written by Margaret Weis without assistance from usual co-author Tracy Hickman. The original trilogy, The Lost King, King's Test, and King's Sacrifice, concerns Dion's adventures and eventual rise to the throne. A few years later, Margaret Weis realized that, while Dion had achieved his goals, the main characters of the series - the sundered lovers Sagan and Maigrey - had not achieved peace, and penned the fourth book, Ghost Legion.

She has since completed a trilogy of spin-offs concerning the mercenary team Mag Force 7 introduced in King's Sacrifice. Based originally on The Magnificent Seven, the team developed a much more varied membership just in time to star in their own novels: The Knights of the Black Earth, Robot Blues, and Hung Out. Weis and Don Perrin released a collectible card game under the name Mag Force 7.

== The Lost King ==
The Lost King
- Author: Margaret Weis
- Language: English
- Series: Star of the Guardians
- Genre: Science fiction
- Publisher: Bantam Spectra
- Publication date: 1990
- Publication place: United States
- Media type: Print
- Pages: 458 (paperback)
- ISBN: 0-553-28600-5
- OCLC: 22338178
- Preceded by: none
- Followed by: King's Test

Seventeen-year-old Dion Starfire has lived on a backwater planet, Syrac 7, with Platus Morianna for his entire life, but that life is about to turn upside down as Sagan has finally found them. Platus contacts Mendaharin "Tusk" Tusca, the son of an old friend, and pays him to take Dion off-planet. Platus himself stays behind and buys time with his life. Tusk and Dion travel to the planet Vangelis to seek the advice of General John Dixter. Sagan, for his part, manages to track down Maigrey Morianna who has also been off-radar for seventeen years. The fact that they were once lovers does not stop him from arresting her as a monarchist and sending her to trial. Sagan then travels to Vangelis to help put down the rebellion (i.e., Dixter's forces). Dion goes voluntarily to the Warlord's flagship, where Sagan and Maigrey informed him of his true heritage. The novel is punctuated by an attack from the Corasians, an alien race bent on conquering our galaxy.

== King's Test ==
King's Test
- Author: Margaret Weis
- Language: English
- Series: Star of the Guardians
- Genre: Science fiction
- Publisher: Bantam Spectra
- Publication date: 1991
- Publication place: United States
- Media type: Print
- Pages: (paperback)
- ISBN: 0-553-28907-1
- Preceded by: The Lost King
- Followed by: King's Sacrifice

Though Dixter's mercenaries fought honorably beside Sagan's forces to repel the Corasians, Sagan orders them killed at the end of The Lost King; at the beginning of King's Test, which picks up moments after, Dion sallies out to save his friends. He flees with Tusk and Nola (Tusk's new girlfriend), though Dixter was captured. Maigrey leaves as well, traveling to the nauseous planet of Laskar, where a weapons magnate named Snaga Ohme has been building a new weapon. This space-rotation bomb, designed by Sagan and intended for his purchase, could theoretically destroy the entire universe. Maigrey buys it by selling her soul, in the form of her starjewel, only to realize that said jewel is the bomb's arming key. Meanwhile, Dion, Tusk and Nola travel to Laskar as well, called by a distress call ostensibly from Maigrey, but actually sent by Abdiel, leader and only remaining member of the Order of the Black Lightning. These mind-seizers, as they are informally called, use their Blood Royal telepathy and nanobiotic machines to take control of their followers' minds. Finally, Sagan arrives as well, having learned that Dion is now in the grip of the most manipulative man alive. The action culminates in a weapons exhibition at Ohme's, where Maigrey retrieves her starjewel, Dion publicly declares himself king and Sagan swears his fealty to him, Dion attempts to kill Sagan on Abdiel's advice, and Sagan is forced to cede the bomb to his new king. Abdiel, for his part, escapes.

== King's Sacrifice ==
King's Sacrifice
- Author: Margaret Weis
- Language: English
- Series: Star of the Guardians
- Genre: Science fiction
- Publisher: Bantam Spectra
- Publication date: 1991
- Publication place: United States
- Media type: Print
- Pages: 520 (paperback)
- ISBN: 0-553-29360-5
- Preceded by: King's Test
- Followed by: Ghost Legion

This novel is set six months after the previous one. There is no sign of Abdiel—except in the reflection of a water glass standing on the desk of Galactic President Peter Robes. It seems that Abdiel was actually the man who orchestrated the Revolution. Dion is now a public celebrity, but has not managed to take any concrete steps towards establishing his rule. Sagan returns home to the monastery of the Order of Adamant, where he was born (his father had only one lapse in his life, but it clearly bore fruit), as Sagan the Elder lies on his death bed. It turns out to be a trap orchestrated by Abdiel, however. Abdiel takes Sagan to the Corasian galaxy, where he plans on—and will succeed at—prying the secrets of the space-rotation bomb from Sagan's head and selling them to the Corasians. Maigrey organizes a rescue mission, while Dion sojourns on the home planet of one of his staunchest supporters, Bear Olefsky, a trip that doubles as Nola's and Tusk's honeymoon. There he meets Kamil Olefsky, Bear's daughter, and they fall in love. Shortly thereafter, however, he is forced to pledge his hand to the daughter of one of his other allies so that Maigrey's rescue attempt will succeed. Maigrey collects her supporters, including Brother Daniel, a member of Sagan's order, and Xris and his Mag Force 7 team. With Dion's eventual backup, she succeeds in rescuing Sagan and slaying Abdiel—but at the cost of several lives, including her own. Sagan, fulfilling a prophecy, is forced to kill her with his own hand to prevent Abdiel's final blow from driving her insane. The planetoid is then destroyed; Sagan disappears, presumed lost.

The novel closes with Dion's coronation. He welcomes John Dixter into the government as the Lord of Admiralty; says good-bye to Tusk and Nola, the only friends he's ever had; prepares to meet his fiancee for the first time and marry her moments after; and welcomes Archbishop Fideles—Brother Daniel—as the new head of the galactic clergy. At the abbey of the Order of Adamant, monks and lay people watch the ceremony with joy, including a new member, Brother Paenitens.

== Ghost Legion ==
Ghost Legion
- Author: Margaret Weis
- Language: English
- Series: Star of the Guardians
- Genre: Science fiction
- Publisher: Bantam Spectra
- Publication date: 1993
- Publication place: United States
- Media type: Print
- Pages: 534 (paperback)
- ISBN: 0-553-56331-9
- Preceded by: King's Sacrifice
- Followed by: none

Dion, twenty-two years old, has been king of the galaxy for two years. His marriage to his wife Astarte has always been loveless, but recent desperation has caused him to open an illicit affair with Kamil. Xris is contacted by Dixter and asked to investigate an alarming development: something has stolen the space-rotation bomb—and literally walked through walls to do it. Tusk, for his part, is having trouble with his interplanetary taxi service, and is approached—or rather hijacked—by recruiters for a new mercenary army called the Ghost Legion. Maigrey, pacing the celestial halls of heaven, chafes with her inability to influence the mortal plane, and eventually breaks Divine Law to help move things along. When Dion develops a sudden sexual interest in Astarte, she realizes concurrently that he must be having an affair, and also that she herself is pregnant. Archbishop Fideles (formerly Brother Daniel) discovers a troubling secret: that Amodius Starfire, Dion's uncle and former ruler of the galaxy, may have had an incestuous heir. Brother Paenitens sheds his cassock for his former life as Derek Sagan and informs Dion of this threat. Sagan then flies to the last known location of explorer Garth Pantha, who took the child off of Amodius's hands. There he finds a planet, Vallombrosa, shielded from conventional sensors by life forms made of dark matter. On it, Pantha and Amodius's son, Flaim Starfire, await, and to them Sagan swears his allegiance. Finally, Astarte leaves Dion and returns to her mother DiLuna on the planet Ceres.

When DiLuna discovers Dion's affair, she sends assassins to kill Kamil, and Astarte hires Xris to help her protect her rival. The two retreat to Ceres, where Astarte is high priestess and can guarantee Kamil diplomatic immunity, to work out some compromise over Dion. They are attacked by members of the Ghost Legion (including the people who hijacked Tusk) and kidnapped from the temple, despite the best efforts of Xris, Raoul, the Little One, Brother Daniel and Kamil herself. Tusk, in the meanwhile, receives the scare of his life when Sagan, disguised as "Lazarus Banquo," forces him to join the Ghost Legion. Tusk's first task is to bring Dion to Vallombrosa, where the cousins finally meet. Flaim has the space-rotation bomb, and he wants Dion to renounce his kingship. When Dion refuses, Flaim sets him up: he has allied with the Corasians, and Dion will heroically die fighting them off. Flaim's machinations drive a rift between Dion and Kamil, and his revelation of Astarte's pregnancy also bring the couple together on friendly terms for the first time. Sagan creates a series of double-crosses and brings Flaim's machinations to their knees: Tusk, after Sagan sets the situation up, convinces Flaim's mercenaries to leave his service; Astarte is smuggled off by royalists; Dion, Tusk and Kamil escape; and with Maigrey's help, Sagan gives his life to keep Flaim busy while the space-rotation bomb, finally truly armed, ticks its way towards destruction. The dark-matter creatures contain the blast, preventing it from consuming the entire galaxy, but Sagan, Flaim, Pantha and Vallombrosa are gone. Triumphant, the King and Queen return to their thrones; Kamil returns to college, ready to make her own way through the galaxy; Tusk is offered a commission by Dion and Dixter; and Sagan and Maigrey reunite in the afterlife, never again to part, even should all hell bar their way.

== Additional media ==
In addition to the books, Star of the Guardians has been made into a collectible card game by the same name. The game was released by Mag Force 7 in April 1995.

== Mag Force 7 members ==
Xris Cyborg - formerly a Federal agent, Xris (pronounced 'Chris') was brutally wounded when an investigation into a criminal organization, the Hung, turned out to be an ambush. He left the hospital 65% cyborg, walked out on his wife, and formed a mercenary team, "Xris's Commandos," during which time he came to the attention of a number of the galaxy's more prominent military officers—Warlord Derek Sagan, General (and later Lord of Admiralty) John Dixter, and the Lady Maigrey Morianna, who hired him for an invasion of Corasian space (a feat never before attempted due to its suicidal nature). Xris was one of the few survivors of that raid, and (due to its almost total reorganization) his group was eventually renamed Mag Force 7.

Harry Luck - Mag Force 7's premiere pilot, Harry is well-intentioned but oafish and rather slow on the uptake. He is the only member of Mag Force 7 to have also been in Xris's Commandos and is intensely loyal to its leader. Very little is known about his history and personal life, which in some ways suits the character quite well. He is often regarded as dumber than a post, as there are several jibes in the series referring to injuries sustained to his rear end as possibly damaging his intelligence. Actually his intelligence was damaged from one too many stun blasts to the head.

Raoul de Beausoleil - Hailing from the planet of Adonis, where beauty is prized above all else, Raoul is known primarily for the size of his wardrobe, his well-maintained hair, nails and physique, and constant use of make-up. Formerly an employee of weapons magnate and fellow Adonian Snaga Ohme, he found himself drifting after his employer's demise and signed on to the Lady Maigrey's rescue mission. He has been with Xris ever since. Raoul is a Loti, a recreational drug user who maintains a constant euphoria, although no one from Mag Force 7 has ever seen Raoul use any type of drugs. Xris harbors an idea that Raoul is perfectly drug-free and is silently laughing at everyone being fooled by his clever act. He is also one of the most clever and deadly poisoners in the galaxy; his favorite trick is to hide poison in his lip gloss, creating a kiss that is truly to die for. He is also a notoriously bad shot with any form of projectile weaponry.

The Little One - a diminutive and enigmatic figure, approximately the height of a small child, constantly swaddled in an oversize raincoat and battered fedora, from under which peer two bright eyes. The Little One (no known gender) is a formidable telepath, and hangs out with Raoul because his drug-induced bliss is soothing. Raoul also acts as its mouthpiece, as The Little One cannot (or at least does not) talk. The Little One's only known armament is a blowgun with poisoned darts; its main talent is to keep Raoul focused and provide the team with telepathic reconnaissance. The Little One is eventually revealed to be a Tongan, a member of an extremely reclusive race, and becomes the first recorded example of that species in medical history. Xris made that discovery after finding him in a pool of blood in a hotel bathroom, thinking him almost dead. Dr. Quong revealed that the injuries were mild and he looked that way normally.

Darlene Mohini - formerly Dalin Rowan, Xris's fellow Fed. After the botched investigation on TISor 13, in which Xris became a cyborg, Rowan realized that he was under the eyes of the Hung. He faked his own death and changed his gender, becoming Major Darlene Mohini of the Royal Navy, a signal-intelligence and electronic countermeasures officer on a distant star base. Xris thought she had set him up and hunted her down, only to get the shock of his life; the two eventually reconciled their differences, especially after Mohini was instrumental in foiling a plot to assassinate His Royal Majesty Dion Starfire. It is unknown whether Mohini was officially invited to join Mag Force 7, nor if she accepted, but she remained active in the group's endeavors for some time to come. In the second book of the series, Robot Blues Xris refers to her as a member of Mag Force 7, in the beginning as well as the end.

== Minor Members ==
Dr. Bill Quong - Dr. Quong is the team's medical expert. Although reason dictates he could gain more golden eagles (Currency) by opening a private practice, all his attempts to do this have thus failed. The main reason being he tends to refer to people as machines, due to his degree in engineering, and logic in the simple fact that humans are but biological machines. As such, he proves to be a great asset to Xris, keeping both his cyborg and human components in shape. He is also adept at the use of firearms. He also has an odd fascination with The Little One, often poking and prodding him in order to write more on his paper about the Tongans.

Tycho - Tycho is the team's sniper and money manager. He is from a humanoid race often referred to as "Chameleons" due to their ability to change color to suit their backgrounds. As such they are completely nude most of the time, a fact many people take a moment to get used to. They are also quite slender, to the point it makes hitting one from range difficult. They are much like reptiles in the fact that they are taller than humans and have elongated limbs. They are also unable to learn human speech, and no human is ever seen in the series as being able to understand their language. As such, Tycho requires the use of a translator, which either is highly defective, or his race has some highly imaginative sayings, such as "All for one, and damn the torpedoes!". There are two Tychos in the series. The first, a sniper and vegetarian, is killed by a grenade in the second book of the series. Earlier in the book, Tycho remarks that he doesn't much mind dying, as his life insurance payout would be massive and tax free to his family. The second Tycho, his younger brother (one of 11 capable of taking his place), joins the team after his brother's death, and as part of a tradition, assumes Tycho's name, and all of his unfinished contracts. The second Tycho is a Demolitions expert, as well as another expert in money management ("It runs in the family"). He prefers chocolate to all other foodstuff. As a note, Xris thought that Tycho was indistinguishable from his brothers and sister, mother and father, and every single one of his race.

Jamil The team's military expert, and the obligatory wise cracking individual of military background. Jamil is a black male of a moderate build. He is apparently very handsome as he is quite the womanizer, having 2 wives, somewhat legally, as well as many one time flings throughout the galaxy. Whereas Harry is slow to catch on, Jamil is quick like a whip, although many times what he says is heavily ladled with sarcasm. As it is, anything that was or is used by the military, Jamil can give specifications as well as use, minus heavily passworded computers. Jamil often takes his shots where he can get them. When impersonating a superior officer to Xris (Jamil was a Colonel, Xris was a Captain) he used this time to take pot shots at Xris by ordering him around, making him do such things as moving baggage.
