= The Second Generation =

Book by Margaret Weis and Tracy Hickman

- Cover of the first edition.
- Authors: Margaret Weis; Tracy Hickman
- Illustrator: Ned Dameron
- Cover artist: Larry Elmore
- Language: English
- Series: Dragonlance
- Genre: Fantasy
- Publisher: TSR
- Publication date: February 1994
- Publication place: United States
- Media type: Print
- Pages: 306
- ISBN: 1-56076-822-3
- OCLC: 49246883
- LC Class: CPB Box no. 2217 vol. 7

The Second Generation is a collection of five novellas in the fantasy genre by Margaret Weis and Tracy Hickman. It is part of the Dragonlance series.

== Plot introduction ==
This book is in fact five novellas by Margaret Weis and Tracy Hickman. They relate the stories of the children of the Heroes of the Lance. The first, Kitiara's Son, relates the story of Steel Brightblade. The second, The Legacy, is about Palin Majere, Caramon Majere's son. The third, Wanna Bet?, is an adventure of Palin and his two brothers Tanin and Sturm. The fourth, Raistlin's Daughter, tells a myth of Raistlin Majere's daughter. The fifth, The Sacrifice, is about Gilthas, Tanis Half-Elven's son.

Three of the novellas (The Legacy, Wanna Bet?, and Raistlin's Daughter) were first printed in the Dragonlance Tales trilogy.

=== Explanation of the novel's title ===
"The Second Generation" refers to the nature of the stories, being that they are the "Second Generation" of heroes, the children of the Heroes of the Lance.

== Plot summary ==
Kitiara's Son is the story of Steel Brightblade, the child of Kitiara uth Matar and Sturm Brightblade. It begins with a woman named Sara Dunstan, the adoptive mother of Steel, going to Caramon Majere and telling him the tale. He tells her how Kitiara, on her northern journey with Sturm, seduced him and became pregnant with his child. She then found herself with Sara, who cared for her during the pregnancy. When the child was born, she kept him and Kitiara left. Sara and Steel moved to Palanthas, a large city, where it became apparent that Steel had a warrior spirit. He was contacted by Ariakan to join the Knights of Takhisis, and he accepted, going with Ariakan to train. She tells him that he will soon make the oath to become a Knight, and Caramon goes with her to help stop Steel. They go and get Tanis, an old friend of Caramon's, to help. Riding a blue dragon, they go to Storm's Keep, the fortress of the Knights, and take Steel from it. They go into the High Clerist's Tower, a bastion of the Knights of Solamnia, to Sturm's tomb. There, the Starjewel, an elven relic of Sturm's, goes to Steel and the sword Brightblade is given to him. The body then disappears. They escape the Tower, but Steel decides to go back to the Keep to swear the oath. Steel then swears the oath and becomes a Knight of Takhisis.

The Legacy relates the tale of Palin Majere, the son of Caramon and the nephew of Raistlin Majere, as he takes his Test of Magic. In the Tower of High Sorcery, the mages tell Caramon that they believe Raistlin intends to steal Palin's body to return to the world. Caramon and Palin go with Dalamar to the Tower of High Sorcery at Palanthas, where they go to laboratory where Raistlin had worked his magic. The door will not open for Dalamar, but Palin can go in. His Test begins. He believes he goes into the Abyss and rescues Raistlin, and then back in the world Raistlin tries to allow Takhisis into the world. Palin tries to close the Portal and Raistlin attacks him, though he in fact survives as it was all part of the Test. Having passed, Palin is allowed out. Raistlin stays in the room and, in a monologue, reveals that when Dalamar tried to summon his illusion Raistlin actually appeared, though not by Dalamar's power but by his own choice. Raistlin says he has paid his final debt and gives the Staff of Magius to Palin, then goes back to his sleep. Palin is made a true mage, and leaves for home.

Wanna Bet? is the story of Tanin, Sturm, and Palin Majere as they adventure to recover the Graygem of Gargath. They meet a dwarf named Dougan Redhammer, who they make a bet with that they can outdrink. They all get drunk and pass out, and awake on a gnome ship bound for the isle that holds the Graygem. They get to an island and begin a journey to find it. Dougan makes a bet with a local chief for much of their possessions, and loses. They press on to the Castle, and inside find a group of adoring women. They pass these, and go on to find Lord Gargath, the possessor of the Graygem, who is constantly shapeshifting thanks to the chaotic magic of it. Dougan, who is revealed to be the god Reorx, makes a bet with Gargath that Palin can throw his hammer into the air and it will never fall. The hammer strikes the Graygem and its magical powers return it to its forger, Reorx, and Reorx also reclaims the hammer. Everyone parts ways, and the Graygem is later seen in Dragons of Summer Flame. As well Reorx loses the Greygem in a bet, which was the reason he lost it in the first place.

Raistlin's Daughter is a myth about the daughter of the mage, Raistlin. In it, Raistlin and Caramon are at an inn and an Irda woman, incredibly beautiful, is magically afflicted and cursed to make love to Raistlin. Raistlin is likewise afflicted, and he decides to leave into the snowy weather. While in a cave, the Irda comes to him and they make love, lifting the curse. She magically erases his memory afterwards. The Irda goes back to the inn and has the child, dying in the process. More Irda come and reclaim the child afterward.

The Sacrifice is the story of Gilthas, the weak son of Tanis Half-Elven and Laurana. It begins with two elves meeting with Dalamar the Dark, a black-robed mage, gaining his help to trap Gilthas in Qualinesti that he might become a puppet ruler of the elves. The scene goes to Gilthas, the protected and weak youth, who is rebellious against his parents. He receives a letter from a Qualinesti Senator, Rashas, to meet him in an inn, and Gilthas runs off to do so. Tanis goes after him and discovers signs that make him believe that Gilthas was ambushed, though it is in fact not true. Dalamar appears to him and Tanis is knocked out. Gilthas's fate is revealed; he was met by Rashas, who rode a griffin, and taken to Qualinost, capital of the elves. There, he is taken to a room where the elven Queen Alhana Starbreeze resides against her will. Rashas goes to make preparation for Gilthas's coronation, and Gilthas is forced to stay in the city. Dalamar reveals to Tanis that Gilthas is to be made king of the Qualinesti, and they begin to make plans. Gilthas is told he will be crowned the next day. Dalamar reveals to Tanis that what has transpired has destroyed the chance for a massive alliance as was planned, thanks to Rashas. Alhana's servant Samar comes to rescue them, but Rashas arrives in time to stop it. Samar is arrested, and Gilthas and Alhana are separated. Gilthas tells Rashas he will not swear the oath to become King, but Rashas threatens to kill Alhana if he doesn't; Gilthas agrees. Tanis and Dalamar, aided by magic, go to try to stop the coronation, and when Tanis commands Gilthas to take off the medallion that allows him to be King, Gilthas refuses and swears to become Speaker. Dalamar and Tanis rescue Alhana, and after Dalamar escapes the pair of them are exiled from Qualinesti. Tanis is sent to the border where he meets Dalamar and discovers Alhana has already gone on with Samar. Gilthas appears to say good-bye to his father, and after he does so returns to Qualinesti. Tanis and Dalamar then depart.

== Characters in The Second Generation ==
- Steel Brightblade, dark knight, son of Kitiara.
- Caramon Majere, twin brother of Raistlin Majere. Appears as a secondary character in several stories.
- Tanis Half-Elven, same as Caramon appears as a secondary character in several stories, also father of Gilthas.
- Palin Majere, white-robed mage, son of Caramon.
- Tanin and Sturm Majere, Knights of Solamnia, are sons of Caramon. They journey with their brother Palin.
- Raistlin Majere, a powerful yet physically frail, he is a ruthless wizard. Appears in several stories.
- Gilthas, son of Tanis, made Speaker of the Sun, or ruler of elves.
- Dalamar the Dark, evil dark elf who tries to aid Tanis in rescuing Gilthas.

== Reception ==
A reviewer from Publishers Weekly commented that "poor grammar, weak imagery and rickety old plots dressed up as Matters of Import doom this series of novellas [...] Action focuses on uninspired tales of Caramon Majere's son Palin's quest to be a wizard and political unrest among the Elves, which threatens the possibility of hegemony. There's hardly any suspense since contrivances make it clear that the eventual victory will be by authorial fiat. Descriptions are repeated three or four times, often within paragraphs of each other--and little of it deserves close attention. For Dragon Lance game players, there is, of course, an appendix with game statistics and the like".
