= Sovereign Stone =

2000–03 novel trilogy by Margaret Weis and Tracy Hickman

- Well of Darkness (2000); Guardians of the Lost (2001); Journey into the Void (2003)
- Author: Margaret Weis and Tracy Hickman
- Cover artist: Larry Elmore
- Country: United States
- Language: English
- Genre: Fantasy, Role-playing game
- Publisher: HarperCollins
- Published: 2000 – 2003
- Media type: Print
- No. of books: 3

The Sovereign Stone series is a trilogy of fantasy novels: Well of Darkness (2000), Guardians of the Lost (2001), and Journey into the Void (2003), set in the same universe of the Sovereign Stone role-playing game. Both the books and the game were primarily written by Margaret Weis and Tracy Hickman.

== Premise ==
The first book is set during the reign of King Tamaros of Vinnengael, the most powerful Human kingdom. Tamaros is the father of Prince Helmos and his younger half-brother Prince Dagnarus. The next two novels are set approximately 200 years later and follow Dagnarus in his bid to take over the world, as well as the story of his allies and opponents.

There are four races on the main continent, Loerem, with two further races appearing in the second and third books, one from a distant world. The main four races are primarily dedicated to one of the four elements: the Humans are associated with earth/stone, the Elves with air/wind, the Orks with Water/the Sea, and the Dwarves with fire. The fifth race, the Taan, are associated with the void. The sixth race, the Pecwae, rely on earth magic drawn from stones, such as turquoise. Each race's magic-users draw power primarily from their element, as well as occasionally from outside their racial element.

Each races have their own god(s). The Humans worship a pantheon always referred to as a group, "the gods", rather than individually. The Orks worship the gods who live in their holy mountain and follow the signs read by their shamans. The Elves worship the Father and Mother, and the Dwarves worship the Wolf. The Taan also have a pantheon of gods, but separate them as individuals with power over various events. The Pecwae refer to simply the gods, similar to humans. It is not made clear in the books if all the gods are one group or separate groups, but all the races were given the Sovereign Stone by their gods through the King of Vinnengael.

The gods had originally rewarded King Tamaros for his faith by giving him the power to create Dominion Lords, a group of holy warriors who were to promote peace and understanding among the four main races. As strife continued, the King went to the gods and asked them for something to help create peace among the races. They gave him the Sovereign Stone which could be split into four portions, each representing one of the four elements. The King gave one portion to each of the races so that they could create their own Dominion Lords. A fifth portion of the Stone that was unseen, save by the young Prince Dagnarus, was the Void. As a balance to the Sovereign Stone, a Void follower was able to accept the Dagger of the Vrykyl from the Void itself, which has similar powers to create the antithesis of the Dominion Lords.

== Races ==
=== Humans ===
Humans are in tune with the magic of earth, a power which is controlled through the church. While once a unified race in the nation of Vinnengael, they have become divided into varying nations and ethnic groups by war and time, with different cultures, practices, and alliances.

=== Orks ===
Orks are excellent seafarers, connected to the magic of the water. They are master engineers and are dedicated to the reading of omens. The authors have commented that they wanted the Orks in this world to be more than "the usual cannon-fodder", and made several changes to the average fantasy orc.

=== Dwarves ===
Dwarves are associated with the element of fire. They are master horsemen, living as nomads on the great plains. Any dwarf who is unable to ride with the tribe or is convicted of a crime is sentenced to be "the Unhorsed" and condemned to live in one of the three "Cities of the Unhorsed". The dwarf god is "the Wolf", and they believe that if they lead a good life their soul is reborn in the body of a wolf, to run in the pack of their god.

=== Elves ===
Elves segregate themselves from the rest of the world. They are ruled by the Divine, a religious authority, who is aided by the Shield of the Divine in all military matters, though with frequent power struggles between the Shield and the Divine. There are 12 noble houses of elves of which everyone is either a member or a follower, as well as an exiled house that appears in the second and third books. Elves practice a form of ancestor worship, and live in very dense multi-generational family homes.

=== Pecwae ===
A race of wee-folk, Pecwae are skilled earth mages and always live near a Human tribe called the Trevenici, with whom they have a symbiotic relationship. The Pecwae are weak and preyed upon by other races, and the Trevenici protect them, in exchange for magical aid and healing.

=== Taan ===
The Taan are a beast-like race, who worship the Lord of the Void, Dagnarus. They embed gemstones believed to possess powerful magic in their hides. Taan are unable to speak the human language 'Elderspeak' and humans are unable to speak the Taan language. Instead, the Taan rely on half-Taan to speak both languages.

== Sources ==
- Weis, Margaret. Hickman, Tracy. Well of Darkness (Sovereign Stone, Book 1) Elmore's (2000). ASIN B000JZKG6Y
- Weis, Margaret. Hickman, Tracy. Guardians of the Lost (Sovereign Stone, Book 2) Elmore's (2001). ISBN 978-0-06-105179-1
- Weis, Margaret. Hickman, Tracy. Journey into the Void (Sovereign Stone, Book 3) Elmore's (2002). ASIN B0002X7W0G
- Perrin, Don. Smith, Lester. Sovereign Stone, Game System Sovereign Press (1999). ISBN 0-9658422-3-1
