= Sovereign Stone (role-playing game) =

Tabletop fantasy role-playing game

Sovereign Stone is a role-playing game that was originally produced by Sovereign Press, Inc and published by Corsair Publishing, based on the Sovereign Stone novels. The game was written by Don Perrin and Lester W. Smith.

== Reception ==
Scott Haring reviewed the Sovereign Stone role-playing game for Pyramid.
