= Dragonvarld =

Novel trilogy by Margaret Weis

- Mistress Of Dragons, The Dragon's Son, Master Of Dragons
- Author: Margaret Weis
- Country: United States
- Language: English
- Genre: Fantasy
- Publisher: Tor Books
- Published: 2003 - 2005
- Media type: Print (Hardback, Paperback)

Dragonvarld is a trilogy of fantasy novels by Margaret Weis. Within the series, this also refers to the setting; the word Dragonvarld is said to be the Dragon name for Earth ("Dragon World"). It resembles Earth of the Late Middle Ages or the early Renaissance, complete with a church bent on witch hunts and demon hunts. The trilogy describes a world in which humans believe that they are the rulers of the world, while the co-existing dragons know that they themselves are the true masters.

== Series synopsis ==
=== Mistress Of Dragons ===
Dragons have made a pact against dealing with the human world, organizing their own Parliament to rule themselves and their interactions with humans. A renegade dragon named Maristara has gone and taken over the valley of Seth, a human realm. She eludes dragon law and justice by keeping out other dragons with magic and by using humans who she has trained in dragon magic. She is a black dragon and therefore one of the oldest, strongest and most powerful of all dragons.

A young green dragon named Braun, a grandchild of Maristara, brings startling evidence to Parliament that his father, who had tried to coax Maristara out of her valley, has died. His death was previously thought to be an accident, though Braun has learned he was murdered by another dragon in league with Maristara. Draconas, the walker, is a dragon in human form by dint of powerful illusion magics. Upon hearing this at the Dragon Parliament he decides to complete a task: find the Mistress of Dragons, the ruler of Seth, and from her find the whereabouts of Maristara and give the dragons the opportunity to bring her to justice. With Braun and the human King Edward of Idlyswylde to help get through Maristara's barrier, he sets out to adventure.

=== The Dragon's Son ===
At the end of book one, the almost-cult leader Melisande dies after giving birth to twin sons. Each son has a different father, one (Marcus) being the illegitimate son of Edward, King of Idlyswylde, and the other (Vengeance) being the son of the dragon Grald, who had taken over a human body. Each son is capable of using dragon magic, but only Vengeance has the scaled legs and clawed feet of a dragon. Occasionally helped by the walker Draconas, each of the two sons are unaware of each other's existence and are warned to avoid using magic in order to avoid detection. Meanwhile, an internal struggle in the Parliament of Dragons has the potential to bring destruction to dragon and mortals alike.

=== Master of Dragons ===
Master of Dragons picks up where The Dragon's Son left off; Marcus and Evelina are escaping Dragonkeep down the river while Ven remains in the city to heal and deal with Grald. Draconas must also hide since he now knows that Anora is the traitor of the Dragon Parliament. He trolls the city in the guise of an innocent while gathering information to assist Ven and Marcus in bringing down the unholy trio of dragon traitors. Marcus is kept busy evading Evelina's plots while Ven finds more siblings - Grald's children from his own dragon-magic bearing women. He had been keeping the magically powerful and sane children segregated from the general population of Dragonkeep while training them into a powerful army the likes of which Dragonvarld has never seen before. After what he felt was his 'success' with engendering Ven, Grald starting making more half-breed children and teaching them about dragon superiority. His intentions are to make Ven his next human host and Marcus has to help Ven fight him off in a battle that kills Grald. Ven leads his half-dragon siblings to refuge in Seth while Draconas attempts to have the dragon Parliament band together to stop Anora and Maristara. He fails and Parliament dissolves in disarray. Maristara leads the army of Dragonkeep against Idlyswylde while Anora infiltrates Ramsgate-on-Aston (the capital city) to destroy the new cannons. She had taken the form of Marcus' betrothed Lady Izabelle which set Evelina to jealous plotting, and snared Marcus' mind and magic to keep him from interfering. Dragon fights dragon to attack and defend the humans. Maristara and Anora die in their separate battles when Seth's warriors and priestesses ride to the rescue. Evelina is rewarded for her plots with banishment to a distant convent while Marcus and Ven start building their lives anew.

== Reception ==
Reception to the Dragonvarld series has been positive, with Publishers Weekly praising the trilogy and FantasyMagazine stating that the series was "full of intrigue". The SF Site reviewed Mistress of Dragons, stating that while the book used a "familiar fantasy template", the book employed "an expertly paced narrative". Sfcrowsnest positively reviewed Master of Dragons, citing the battle scenes as a highlight but writing that the character of Evelina was "just damn annoying at times". Kirkus Reviews panned the third entry to the trilogy, calling it "a paint-by-numbers fantasy whose soap-opera characterizations, laughable dialogue and execrable prose will have judicious readers rolling their eyes."

== Publication history ==
- Mistress Of Dragons (2003), by Margaret Weis, (ISBN 0-7653-4390-8)
- The Dragon's Son (2004), by Margaret Weis, (ISBN 0-7653-4391-6)
- Master Of Dragons (2005), by Margaret Weis, (ISBN 0-7653-0470-8)
