= Dragonlance Campaign Setting =

Accessory for the Dragonlance campaign

- Cover of the first edition
- Genre: Role-playing games
- Published: 2003 (Wizards of the Coast)

Dragonlance Campaign Setting is an accessory for the Dragonlance campaign setting, for the 3.5 edition of the Dungeons & Dragons fantasy role-playing game.

== Contents ==
The Dragonlance Campaign Setting hardcover updated the Dragonlance setting for the 3.5 edition.

== Publication history ==
Dragonlance Campaign Setting was designed by Margaret Weis, Don Perrin, Jamie Chambers, and Christopher Coyle. Weis explained that the designers "wanted to begin with the beginning, which was Tracy [Hickman]'s original vision for Dragonlance. That made me the "keeper of the flame" when questions arose. I also worked with the book department editors and the other Dragonlance authors to incorporate their visions into the original. Tracy always said that Krynn was real to those who entered it and that we all saw the same things, just from different perspectives."

== Reviews ==
- Dragão Brasil
- Dragão Brasil
- Black Gate #7
- Backstab #48 (as "Univers")
- Realms of Fantasy
