= Richard A. Knaak =

American fantasy author

- Born: Richard Allen Knaak; May 28, 1961 (age 65); Chicago, Illinois, U.S.
- Education: University of Illinois at Urbana-Champaign
- Writing career
- Genre: Fantasy
- Notable works: Dragonlance series Dragonrealm series Diablo novels Warcraft novels
- Website: www.richardaknaak.com

Richard Allen Knaak (born May 28, 1961) is the author of Dragonlance novels, Dragonrealm, six novels for Blizzard Entertainment's Diablo series, and ten works in the Warcraft universe. He has also written five non-series fantasy books.

== Early life and education ==
Richard Allen Knaak was born May 28, 1961, in Chicago, Illinois, to James Richard Knaak and Anna Maria (Trappen) Knaak. He attended the University of Illinois at Urbana-Champaign, studying chemistry at first, and subsequently rhetoric, and earned a bachelor's degree in 1984. He worked as a warehouseman, resume writer, and office clerk before becoming a full-time freelance writer in 1988.

== Career ==
After reading Andre Norton's Storm over Warlock, he became a fan of fantasy and science fiction. He eventually sold his first short story in 1986, and it was published in 1987. His Dragonlance titles include The Legend of Huma, Reavers of the Blood Sea, Kaz the Minotaur, Land of the Minotaurs, and The Citadel, along with short stories in various anthologies. He also wrote the ten-volume Dragonrealm series, and the first Dragonrealm story, "Firedrake," helped him get his first Dragonlance project. He has also written several stand-alone volumes, including the contemporary fantasies Frostwing, King of the Grey, and Dutchman, plus the heroic adventure The Janus Mask. He has also worked on novels based in the worlds of the computer games Warcraft and Diablo.

Knaak lists Roger Zelazny, Edgar Rice Burroughs, and Edgar Allan Poe as major influences, and has even listed a few of his favorite fellow authors, those being Robert E. Howard, Glen Cook, L. Sprague de Camp, Lawrence Watt-Evans, Harry Turtledove, Jennifer Roberson, Laurell K. Hamilton, Harry Harrison, and Robert Sawyer.

== Bibliography ==
=== Dragonlance ===
1. Series
  1. The Legend of Huma (1988), ISBN 0-88038-548-0
  2. Kaz the Minotaur (1990), ISBN 0-88038-910-9
  3. Land of the Minotaurs (1996), ISBN 0-7869-0472-0
  4. Reavers of the Blood Sea (1999), ISBN 0-7869-1345-2
  5. The Citadel (2000), ISBN 0-7869-1683-4
2. Minotaur Wars
  1. Night of Blood (2003), ISBN 0-7869-2938-3
  2. Tides of Blood (2004), ISBN 0-7869-3251-1
  3. Empire of Blood (2005), ISBN 0-7869-3733-5
3. Ogre Titans
  1. The Black Talon (2007)
  2. The Fire Rose (2008)
  3. The Gargoyle King (2009)

=== Dragonrealm ===
  1. Firedrake (1989), ISBN 0-445-20940-2
  2. Ice Dragon (1989), ISBN 0-445-20942-9
  3. Wolfhelm (1990), ISBN 0-445-20966-6
  4. Shadow Steed (1990), ISBN 0-445-20967-4
  5. The Crystal Dragon (1993), ISBN 0-446-36432-0
  6. Dragon Crown (1994), ISBN 0-446-36464-9
  7. The Horse King (1997), ISBN 0-446-60353-8
  8. Shade (2012)
1. Origins
  1. The Shrouded Realm (1991), ISBN 0-446-36138-0
  2. Children of the Drake (1991), ISBN 0-446-36153-4
  3. Dragon Tome (1992), ISBN 0-446-36252-2
2. The Turning War
  1. Dragon Masters (2013)
  2. The Gryphon Mage (2014)
  3. The Horned Blade (2015)
3. PDF Series
  1. Past Dancer (2002)
  2. Dragon Master (2002)
  3. Skins (2003)
  4. A Wolf in the Fold (2003)
  5. Storm Lord (2003)
  6. The Still Lands (2004)
  7. Game of Ghosts (2012)

=== Diablo ===
1. Diablo series
  1. Legacy of Blood (2001), ISBN 0-671-04155-X
  2. The Kingdom of Shadow (2002), ISBN 0-7434-2692-4
  3. Moon of the Spider (2006), ISBN 0-7434-7132-6
2. The Sin War series
  1. Birthright (2006)
  2. Scales of the Serpent (2007)
  3. The Veiled Prophet (2007)

=== Warcraft ===
1. Day/Night of the Dragon
  1. Day of the Dragon (2001), ISBN 0-671-04152-5
  2. Night of the Dragon (2008), ISBN 0-7434-7137-7
2. War of the Ancients
  1. The Well of Eternity (2004), ISBN 0-7434-7119-9
  2. The Demon Soul (2004), ISBN 0-7434-7120-2
  3. The Sundering (2005), ISBN 0-7434-7121-0
3. Sunwell Trilogy
  1. Dragon Hunt (2005), ISBN 1-59532-712-6
  2. Shadows of Ice (2006), ISBN 1-59532-713-4
  3. Ghostland (2007), ISBN 1-59532-714-2
4. Shadow Wing
  1. The Dragons of Outland (2008), ISBN 1-42781-026-5
  2. Nexus Point (2011), ISBN 1-42781-449-X
5. Independent Books
  1. "Stormrage" (2010), ISBN 1-4165-5087-9
  2. "Wolfheart" (2011), ISBN 1-4516-0575-7
6. Dawn of the Aspects
  1. Part 1 (Feb 2013)
  2. Part 2 (Mar 2013)
  3. Part 3 (Apr 2013)
  4. Part 4 (May 2013)
  5. Part 5 (Jun 2013)

=== Age of Conan ===
1. The God in the Moon (2006), ISBN 0-441-01422-4
2. The Eye of Charon (2006), ISBN 0-441-01445-3
3. The Silent Enemy (2006), ISBN 0-441-01452-6

=== Pathfinder Tales ===
1. Reaper's Eye (2016), ISBN 978-0-7653-8436-2

=== Independent ===
1. King of the Grey (1993), ISBN 0-446-36463-0
2. Frostwing (1995), ISBN 0-446-60149-7
3. The Janus Mask (1995), ISBN 0-446-60150-0
4. Dutchman (1996), ISBN 0-446-60151-9
5. Ruby Flames (1999), ISBN 0-671-03266-6
6. Beastmaster:Myth (2009)
7. Dragon Mound: Book One of the Knight In Shadow Trilogy (2011)
8. Black City Saint (2016)
9. Black City Demon (2017)
10. Rex Draconis (2018)
