= Margaret Weis =

American fantasy novelist (born 1948)

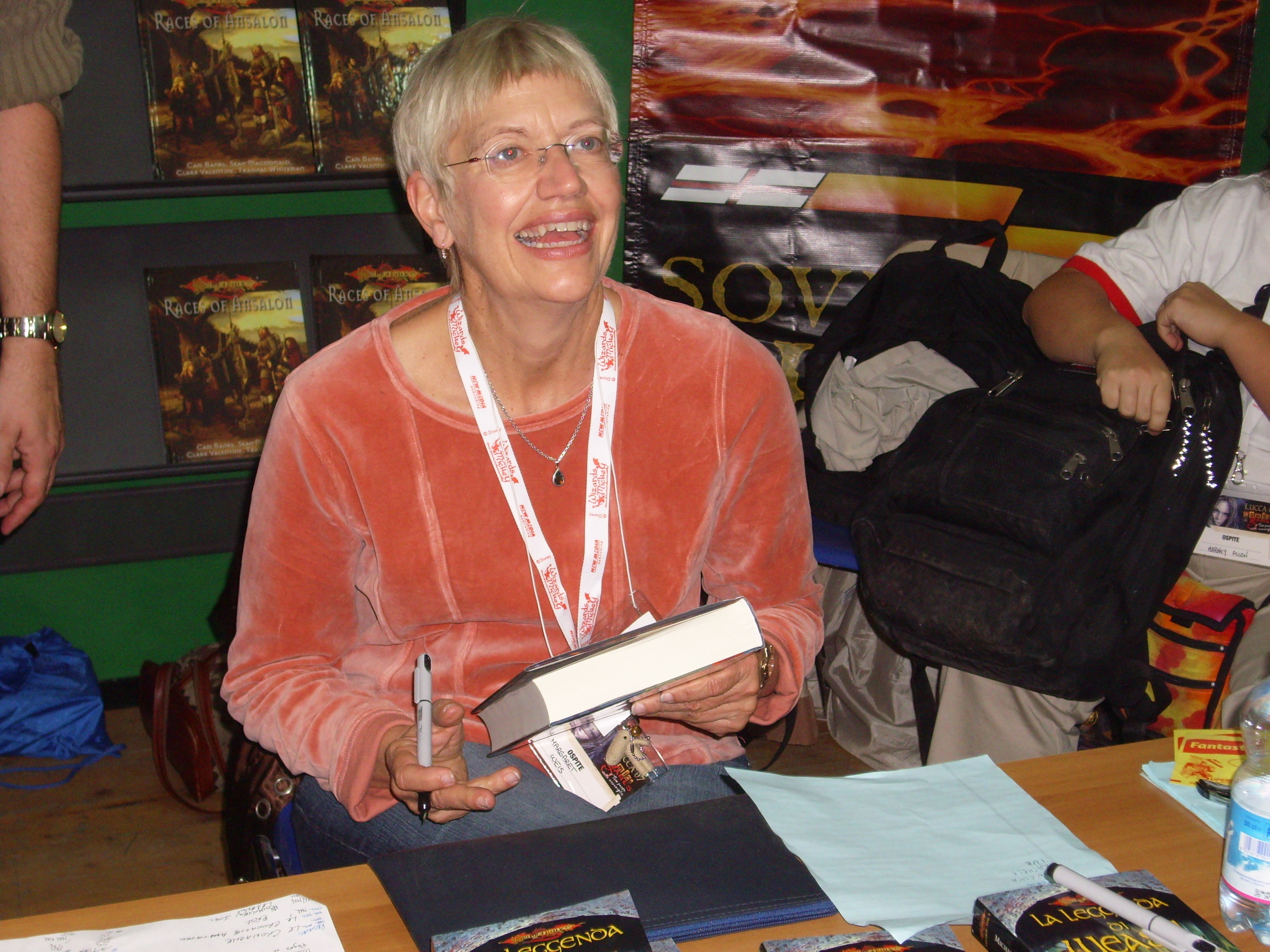
- Margaret Weis at the Lucca Comics & Games convention in 2007
- Born: March 16, 1948 (age 78); Independence, Missouri, U.S.
- Education: University of Missouri (BA)
- Occupation: Novelist
- Spouses: Robert William Baldwin (1970–1982); Donald Bayne Stewart Perrin (1996–2003)
- Children: 2
- Writing career
- Period: 1984–present
- Genres: Fantasy, science fiction
- Website: margaretweis.com

Margaret Edith Weis (/waɪs/; born March 16, 1948) is an American fantasy and science fiction author of dozens of novels and short stories. At TSR, Inc., she teamed with Tracy Hickman to create the Dragonlance role-playing game (RPG) world. She is founding CEO and owner of Sovereign Press, Inc and Margaret Weis Productions, licensing several popular television and movie franchises to make RPG series in addition to their own.

In 1999, Pyramid magazine named Weis one of The Millennium's Most Influential Persons, saying she and Hickman are "basically responsible for the entire gaming fiction genre". In 2002, she was inducted into the Origins Hall of Fame in part for Dragonlance.

== Early life ==
Margaret Weis was born on March 16, 1948, in Independence, Missouri, where she was raised. She discovered heroic fantasy fiction while studying at the University of Missouri (MU). She said, "I read Tolkien when it made its first big sweep in the colleges back in 1966. A girlfriend of mine gave me a copy of the books while I was in summer school at MU. I literally couldn't put them down! I never found any other fantasy I liked, and just never read any fantasy after Tolkien." She conscientiously avoided buying unauthorized publications of his work, and she related the wars in his fictional world to those in the real world of the 1960s.

She graduated from the University of Missouri in 1970 with a Bachelor of Arts in creative writing and literature.

== Career ==
Weis recalled, "Of course, my mother knew I was going to starve with such a worthless degree", so her mother got her a job as a proofreader at a small publishing company in neighboring Kansas City, Missouri. There, she ascended to editor, learned all about the book industry, and found an agent—crediting the job as an unusually good start for an author. She started writing for the low-paying juvenile book market by appealing to librarians with her high-quality, well-researched books. From 1972 to 1983 she worked for Herald Publishing House as advertising director and subsequently as director of Independence Press, Herald Publishing's trade division from 1981 to 1983.

Weis's first book is a biography of the outlaws Frank and Jesse James, because Frank had been buried in a cemetery near her childhood school in Independence. In the late 1970s and early 1980s, she wrote children's books about computer graphics, robots, the history of Thanksgiving, and an adventure book at a second-grade reading level for prisoners with low literacy levels.

=== TSR and Dragonlance ===
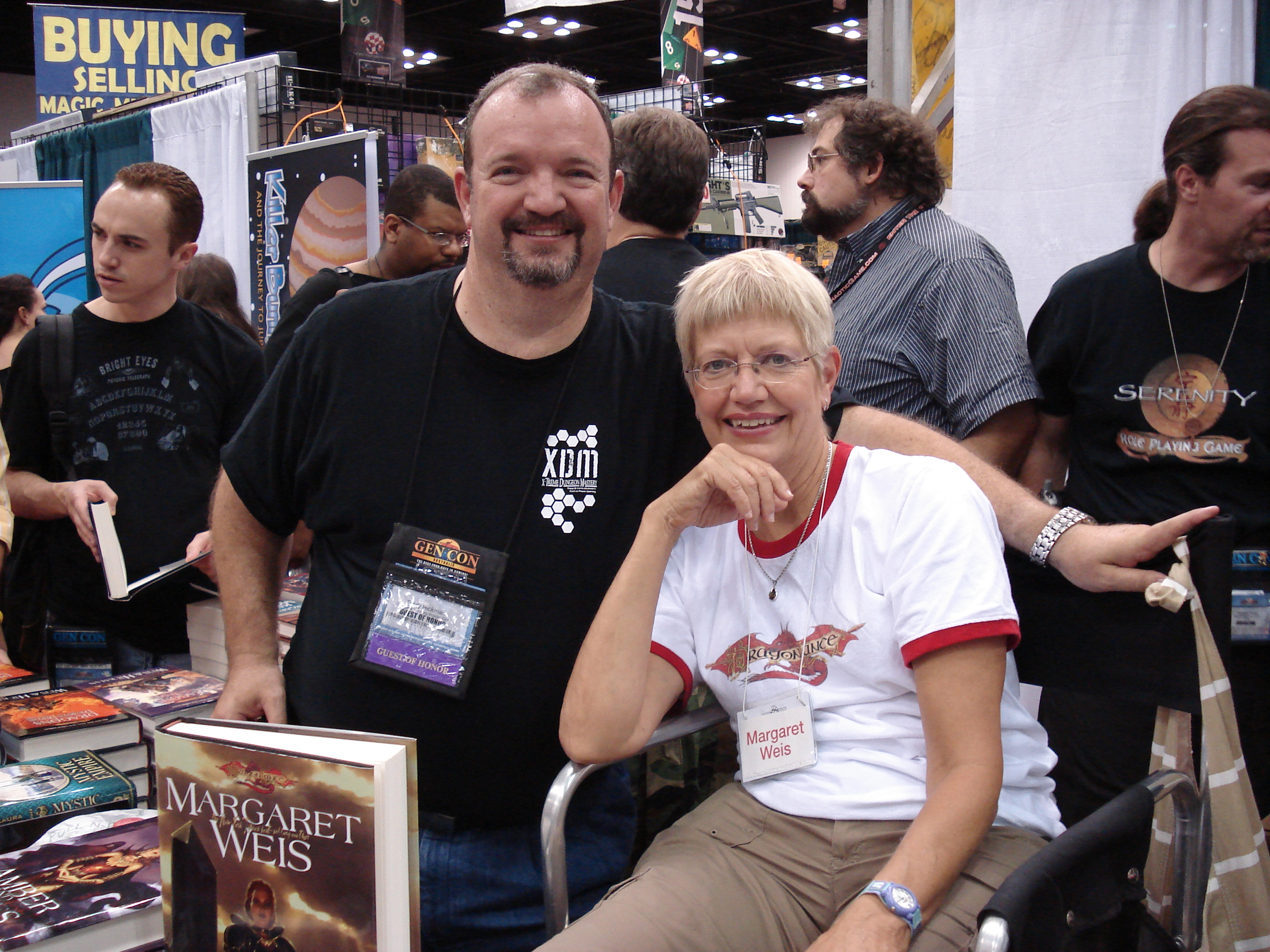
Margaret Weis (seated) with Tracy Hickman at Gen Con Indy 2008

In 1983, Weis applied for a job as a game editor at TSR, Inc. that she saw advertised in Publishers Weekly. TSR turned her down for that position, but hired her as a book editor. She stayed in the book division, leaving the company as an independent author in 1986.

One of her first assignments at TSR was to help coordinate, in a chance meeting with TSR colleague Tracy Hickman, Project Overlord, which was to include a novel and three AD&D modules. Weis and Hickman plotted the novel and hired an author to flesh out story ideas but who lacked grasp of the characters or plots. Having "lived with those characters for months" and threatened by deadline, the two saved the project. She said, "By that time, [Hickman] and I were so into the project that we felt we had to write it." Project Overlord soon became known as Dragonlance. With 4 million sales of the first book in the US and UK, it grew into a trilogy of novels, called the Dragonlance Chronicles, and 15 linked modules. Jean Black, managing editor of TSR's book department, selected Weis and Hickman to write the series. She said, "To my mind, what made the project so successful was that everyone was involved in it, excited about it, and believed in it."

After two years of development, TSR released the game module Dragons of Despair in March 1984 and the novel Dragons of Autumn Twilight in November 1984. TSR had doubts about the finished novel's sales potential, and attempted to order 30,000 copies before ordering the minimum print run of 50,000. The novel's success prompted TSR to publish more copies to meet demand. The novel was written after the completion of the first Dragonlance game modules. Weis and Hickman found this constraining and made the novel too episodic, so they reversed the process for the next books and completed the novels before the related modules were written.

Weis and Hickman also authored the Dragonlance Legends trilogy, published in 1986. Their Dragonlance products included novels, game supplements, short stories, art books, and calendars.

The two started moonlighting as book authors, for four hours each evening and through every weekend. Several successful books afforded them to quit TSR and begin writing full-time in 1986.

=== Entrepreneur ===
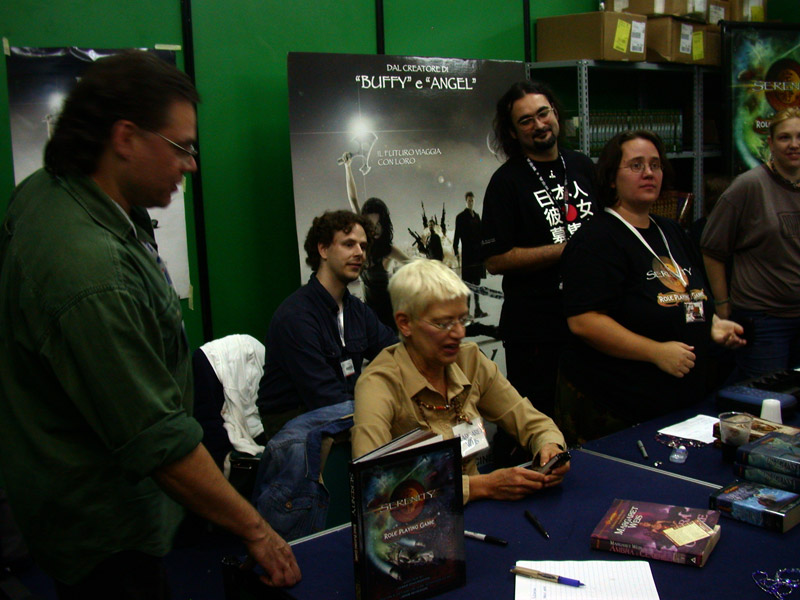
Margaret Weis at the Lucca convention in October 2005.

Having left TSR in 1986, Weis and Hickman continued as a writing team. According to the Kansas City Star profile of major local authors "transformed" by pioneering fantasy author J. R. R. Tolkien, the duo sought to recapture the reality-grounded and humanized experience of Tolkien literature but without copying or emulating it, so a reader could imagine meeting their original magical characters in a real place like a bus stop and conversing using pronounceable names. She attributed their writing partnership's longevity to specialization, where Hickman was the world builder and storyteller who defines "when the moon rises and which way the winds blow", and she brought characters and substance. He then untangled her unsolvable situations. Weis and Hickman wrote the Darksword trilogy (1986–87) and the seven-book Deathgate Cycle (1988–94) for Bantam Books.

Weis's daily workflow consisted of five hours of writing on the computer, starting at 7:30 a.m., even on holidays, often rewriting anything that had surpassed five hours the previous day, and then thinking about the book through the afternoon. She wrote plot ideas and dialogue scraps upon napkins and envelopes until she got a portable computer, and got nervous if unable to work. She said, "I'd love to do mysteries but I don't have the head for them". She mentally, happily, inhabited her own fictional worlds; and upon completion, suffered "a real depression" due to abandoning characters that seemed realer than most people. Her only vacations consisted of hosting fantasy and science fiction conventions worldwide and befriending her fans.

Weis wrote the space opera Star of the Guardians novels, which she calls her favorite series that she has written. She published a game based on Mag Force 7 from 1994 to 1996. In the late 1990s, Larry Elmore brought his fantasy world of Loerem to Weis and Hickman, which they wrote as the Sovereign Stone novel trilogy, published by Del Rey. From 2003 to 2005, Weis completed the Dragonvarld trilogy for Tor.

In 1999, Pyramid magazine named Weis one of The Millennium's Most Influential Persons "at least in the realm of adventure gaming", and said she and Hickman are "basically responsible for the entire gaming fiction genre". Weis was inducted into the Origins Hall of Fame in 2002, recognized in part for "one game line turned literary sensation: Dragonlance".

==== Publishing companies ====
In addition to her writing career, Weis was the owner and chief officer of two publishing companies. She formed the company Sovereign Press, with herself as CEO, to publish the Sovereign Stone role-playing game written by her husband Don Perrin with Lester Smith. To support the setting, Weis and Perrin wrote the short story "Shadamehr and the Old Wives Tale" that was published in Dragon #264 (October 1999). Perrin left Sovereign Press in 2004 and Weis founded Margaret Weis Productions. It published an RPG line based on several licenses, including Serenity and Battlestar Galactica, and Ed Greenwood's new solo venture into roleplaying, Castlemourn.

Weis has served on the board of directors of Mag Force 7, Inc., the developer of the Star of the Guardians and Wing Commander Collectible Trading Card Game (CCGs).

=== Returns to Dragonlance ===
Weis and Hickman returned to Dragonlance in 1995 with Dragons of Summer Flame. Her next project was a solo novel called The Soulforge, based on her favorite character from the trilogy, the dark wizard Raistlin. Wizards of the Coast published a new trilogy of Dragonlance novels by Weis and Hickman called War of Souls, beginning with Dragons of a Fallen Sun (2000).

Wizards of the Coast licensed Dragonlance to Sovereign Press in 2002 to produce role-playing game materials for the setting; Weis and Perrin, with Jamie Chambers and Christopher Coyle, wrote Dragonlance Campaign Setting (2003) which Wizards of the Coast published. Sovereign Press was then able to supplement that book additional using material produced under the d20 license. The license expired in 2007. Between 2004 and 2008, Weis wrote a solo novel trilogy titled The Dark Disciple; the first novel, Amber and Ashes, was published in August 2004. During this period, Weis also co-authored with Hickman The Lost Chronicles trilogy starting with Dragons of the Dwarven Depths in July 2006. There was a fifteen-year hiatus between novels about the Companions before Dragons of the Dwarven Depths was released. After the original Chronicles novels were completed in 1991, the co-authors had a lot of material about them remaining, but moved on to writing about new characters. In 2004, Weis told Hickman she wanted to return to the main protagonists of the Dragonlance world. When the pair contacted their editors, they enthusiastically agreed.

In October 2020, Weis and Tracy Hickman filed suit against Wizards of the Coast for breaching a license for a new Dragonlance novel trilogy. Boing Boing reported that "according to the lawsuit, Weis and Hickman agreed with Wizards of the Coast to produce the new novels in 2017, capping off the series and giving fans a final sendoff. But the company pulled the plug in August 2020". The authors see the new trilogy as "the capstone to their life's work". In December 2020, Weis and Hickman filed to voluntarily dismiss without prejudice their lawsuit, and "the filing noted that Wizards of the Coast had not formally answered their lawsuit, nor had they filed for a summary judgement". Weis and Hickman's publishing agent affirmed a few weeks later that a new trilogy of Dragonlance novels was again in development. The first novel of the new series, Dragonlance: Dragons of Deceit, was released on August 2, 2022.

== Personal life ==
Weis met her future husband in high school, married after college, and had two children. The mentality of a professional writer strained those relationships. After publication of her first book and ten years of marriage, they divorced due to that stress and to different personalities.

In 1983, she moved to the resort city of Lake Geneva, Wisconsin, to work for TSR, living in a house converted from a barn. She said she always avoided reading fantasy books since Tolkien to avoid influencing her work, but favored classics like Charles Dickens, Jane Austen, and Sherlock Holmes in any spare time. She often played games at her co-owned store, Game Guild. She cooked for relaxation, and collected cookbooks in her travels, such as recipes of drinks from Dickens books.

In 1993, Weis was diagnosed with breast cancer and underwent successful chemotherapy. She stayed busy writing The Seventh Gate during treatment.

In 1996, Weis married writer/game designer Don Perrin; the two later divorced.
