= Dragonlance: The New Adventures =

- The cover of Temple of the Dragonslayer
- Temple of the Dragonslayer, The Dying Kingdom, The Dragon Well, Return of the Sorceress, Dragon Sword, Dragon Day, Dragon Knight, Dragon Spell
- Author: Stan Brown, Amie Rose Rotruck, Jeff Sampson, Rebecca Shelley, Ree Soesbee, Stephen D. Sullivan, Tim Waggoner, Dan Willis, Christina Woods
- Illustrator: Dennis Kauth (cartography); Vinod Rams (cover and interior art)
- Country: United States
- Language: English
- Genre: Young adult, Fantasy novels
- Publisher: Wizards of the Coast
- Published: July 2004 - January 2010
- Media type: Print (hardcover and paperback)

Dragonlance: The New Adventures is a series of young adult novels based on the long-running adult fantasy book series, Dragonlance. The series is published by Mirrorstone Books, the young reader imprint of Wizards of the Coast. Launched in July 2004 with the release of its first two books, Dragonlance: The New Adventures continues to release new books on a bimonthly schedule.

The series begins in the summer after the events of the Dragonlance Chronicles trilogy by Margaret Weis and Tracy Hickman. Written by a recurring group of authors and featuring all new characters created specifically for The New Adventures, the series begins when a young girl named Nearra wakes up on a forest path with no idea how she got there, and no memory of who she is. She is soon joined by several new friends who plan to unravel the mystery behind her missing memories. Together these new companions begin a journey across the lands of Krynn that will test them to their limits as they deal with the trials of growing up in a harsh world filled with mystical beasts and power hungry villains.

The first eight books of the series begin and finish the first story arc for the series. After the eighth volume, the series introduced several trilogies that focus on one or a few of the original cast of characters as they set out on separate adventures. With the five trilogies finished, the Dragon Codices give previously minor characters a time to shine in ten different volumes detailing adventures with the various colored dragons of Krynn.

== Books ==
=== Spellbinder and Dragon Quartets ===
The series begins following the end of Dragonlance Chronicles. These two quartets take place from Summer 353 AC through Spring 355 AC.

- Awakening with no memory of who she is, a seemingly normal peasant girl named Nearra finds herself lost in the woods with no clue how she came to arrive there. She soon befriends several other young adventurers, who vow to help her solve the mystery of her lost memories. As the books unravel, Nearra discovers not all of her friends are who they at first appear to be as she learns that she has been drawn into the intricate plans of a black-robed wizard named Maddoc, who intends to release an ancient power that now makes its home in Nearra herself.
  1. Temple of the Dragonslayer (July 2004)
  2. The Dying Kingdom (July 2004)
  3. The Dragon Well (September 2004)
  4. Return of the Sorceress (November 2004)
  5. Dragon Sword (January 2005)
  6. Dragon Day (March 2005)
  7. Dragon Knight (May 2005)
  8. Dragon Spell (July 2005)

=== Trinistyr Trilogy ===
This trilogy's story begins after the end of the Spellbinder & Dragon Quartets and takes place at the same time as the Elidor Trilogy, from Spring 355 AC through the beginning of Fall 355 AC.

- Reunited with her sister, Nearra is tasked with breaking a curse placed on an ancient holy relic called the Trinistyr, a curse that has kept her family from using magic for centuries. With Davyn, her sister, and new friends by her side, Nearra must travel the lands of Krynn and relive the tortures inflicted upon ancient wizards by a long dead ancestor, while a pair of elf mages and a 400-year-old dark cleric stalk her at every turn.
  1. Wizard's Curse (September 2005)
  2. Wizard's Betrayal (January 2006)
  3. Wizard's Return (May 2006)

=== Elidor Trilogy ===
This trilogy's story begins after the end of the Spellbinder & Dragon Quartets. and takes place at the same time as the Trinsityr Trilogy, from Spring 355 AC through the beginning of Fall 355 AC.

- After becoming an unwitting experiment to dark magic, elf thief Elidor becomes the target of an undead king who wants an enchanted crown that now sits upon the elf's brow. With Catriona, Sindri, and new companions by his side, Elidor must head to the homes he spent years running from to protect his family and friends from the undead king intent on destroy everything and everyone Elidor has ever loved.
  1. Crown of Thieves (November 2005)
  2. The Crystal Chalice (March 2006)
  3. City of Fortune (July 2006)

=== A Practical Guide to Dragons ===
This book was written by Sindri Suncatcher during his six-month stay at Cairngorn Keep, after the events of the Elidor Trilogy and before the beginning of his new adventures in the Suncatcher Trilogy.

- Sindri Suncatcher details his vast (and questionable) knowledge of the dragons of Krynn in this hardcover, illustrated encyclopedia written for his family back in his hometown of Weavewillow, near Kendermore. (October 2006)

=== Suncatcher Trilogy ===
This trilogy's story begins after the end of both the Trinistyr Trilogy and the Elidor Trilogy. It takes place at the same time as the Goodlund Trilogy and the Elements Trilogy, during 356 AC.

- Inexplicable kender wizard Sindri Suncatcher must discover the secrets behind his powers before dark forces can hunt down and destroy him.
  1. The Wayward Wizard (September 2006)
  2. The Ebony Eye (March 2007)
  3. The Stolen Sun (September 2007)

=== Goodlund Trilogy ===
This trilogy's story begins after the end of both the Trinistyr Trilogy and the Elidor Trilogy. It takes place at the same time as the Suncatcher Trilogy and the Elements Trilogy, during 356 AC

- Failed knight Catriona Goodlund returns to her homeland to find everything she's ever loved destroyed. Now, she must battle to discover the truth behind the destruction.
  1. Warrior's Heart (November 2006)
  2. Warrior's Blood (May 2007)
  3. Warrior's Bones (November 2007)

=== Elements Trilogy ===
This trilogy's story begins after the end of both the Trinistyr Trilogy and the Elidor Trilogy. It takes place at the same time as the Suncatcher Trilogy and the Goodlund Trilogy, during 356 AC

- Nearra and her sister, Jirah, head to Palanthas so that Nearra can take her wizard's test and become a full-fledged white-robed mage. But nothing goes smoothly when Nearra's test takes she, her sister, and new friends across the world as they try to stop a centuries-old evil plot.
  1. Pillar of Flame (January 2007)
  2. Queen of the Sea (July 2007)
  3. Tempest's Vow (April 2008)

=== The Dragon Codices ===
These A Practical Guide to Dragons adventures take place after the Suncatcher, Goodlund and Elements trilogies, around 356 and 357 AC.

- R.D. Henham, a scribe in the Great Library of Palanthas, has decided to tell ten tales of the ten different color dragons of Krynn, inspired by Sindri Suncatcher's A Practical Guide to Dragons. As Sindri travels the world and sends notes to Palanthas on the dragon tales he's uncovered, R.D. Henham and his fellow scribes set about turning Sindri's notes on the dragons and those who encounter them into adventurous hardcover books for the entire world to read.
  1. Red Dragon Codex (January 2008)
  2. Bronze Dragon Codex (July 2008)
  3. Black Dragon Codex (October 2008)
  4. Brass Dragon Codex (February 2009)
  5. Green Dragon Codex (June 2009)
  6. Silver Dragon Codex (September 2009)
  7. Gold Dragon Codex (January 2010)

== Creators ==
=== Authors ===
- Stan Brown
  1. Dragon Quartet, Vol. 6: Dragon Day
- Amie Rose Rotruck
  1. Bronze Dragon Codex as R.D. Henham
- Rebecca Shelley
  1. Red Dragon Codex as R.D. Henham
  2. Brass Dragon Codex as R.D. Henham
- Jeff Sampson
  1. Dragon Quartet, Vol. 8: Dragon Spell
  2. Trinistyr Trilogy, Vol. 2: Wizard's Betrayal
  3. Suncatcher Trilogy, Vol. 1: The Wayward Wizard
  4. Suncatcher Trilogy, Vol. 2: The Ebony Eye
  5. Suncatcher Trilogy, Vol. 3: The Stolen Sun
- Ree Soesbee
  1. Dragon Quartet, Vol. 5: Dragon Sword
  2. Elidor Trilogy, Vol. 1: Crown of Thieves
  3. Elidor Trilogy, Vol. 2: The Crystal Chalice
  4. Elidor Trilogy, Vol. 3: City of Fortune
  5. Elements Trilogy, Vol. 1: Pillar of Flame
  6. Elements Trilogy, Vol. 2: Queen of the Sea
  7. Elements Trilogy, Vol. 3: Tempest's Vow
  8. Black Dragon Codex as R.D. Henham
- Stephen D. Sullivan
  1. Spellbinder Quartet, Vol. 2: The Dying Kingdom
  2. Goodlund Trilogy, Vol. 1: Warrior's Heart
  3. Goodlund Trilogy, Vol. 2: Warrior's Blood
  4. Goodlund Trilogy, Vol. 3: Warrior's Bones
- Tim Waggoner
  1. Spellbinder Quartet, Vol. 1: Temple of the Dragonslayer
  2. Spellbinder Quartet, Vol. 4: Return of the Sorceress
- Dan Willis
  1. Spellbinder Quartet, Vol. 3: The Dragon Well
  2. Dragon Quartet, Vol. 7: Dragon Knight
  3. Trinistyr Trilogy, Vol. 3: Wizard's Return
- Christina Woods
  1. Trinistyr Trilogy, Vol. 1: Wizard's Curse

=== Illustrators ===
- Dennis Kauth (cartography)
- Vinod Rams (cover and interior art)

== Characters ==
=== Main characters ===
Nearra
Nearra begins the series as a 15-year-old peasant girl. Her life is perfectly normal until she goes to work for the black-robed wizard Maddock, a wizard who has chosen her to be the host for the soul of the long-dead evil sorceress Asvoria. She makes many friends in the effort to restore her lost memory, and they will do anything to expel Asvoria from her body and bring Nearra back, especially Davyn. She later gains her memory and soul back and becomes an aspiring mage.
Featured in the Spellbinder & Dragon Quartets , the Trinistyr Trilogy, and the Elements Trilogy.

Davyn
Davyn is a ranger and the adopted son of the wizard Maddoc. Though the 15-year-old was working with his father in his quest to unleash Asvoria's soul, Davyn soon discovers secrets about himself that will change his destiny forever.
Featured in the Spellbinder & Dragon Quartets , the Trinistyr Trilogy , and the Suncatcher Trilogy.

Elidor
Elidor is a charming half-silvanesti, half-kagonesti elf. Shunned by his elitist noble family for being less than "pure" Elidor set out on his own, only to be roped into Nearra's quest—a quest leading him back to places he never expected to go. He died when Asvoria was released, but through Maddoc's intervention he was brought back to life once more.
Featured in the Spellbinder & Dragon Quartets and the Elidor Trilogy.

Catriona
Catriona is a natural born fighter who was squired to her aunt in training to be a knight. Cast out of the Solamnic Knight at age 17 for failing to save her aunt from death at the hand of some rogues, she set out on a journey to redeem herself in both her eyes and the eyes of the Knights. It's not long before she meets Nearra, a girl under a dark spell who needs her help. She vows to aid Nearra in restoring her memory, but this vow conflicts with her vow to keep Sindri safe. In Dying Kingdom, Catriona meets a handsome prince by the name of Alric Arngrim, later falling in love with him. During Dragon Sword, Catriona swears herself to Maddoc. Later on in the series, however, it is shown that she once more distrusts Maddoc and the purity of his intentions toward her companions.
Featured in the Spellbinder & Dragon Quartets, the Elidor Trilogy, and the Goodlund Trilogy.

Sindri Suncatcher
Sindri, like all kender, is small, endlessly energized, and dangerously curious. Unlike most kender, Sindri thinks he is destined to be a great wizard, even though kender are not supposed to be capable of magic. Though he begins the series as an untrained and slightly delusional "wizard," he and his friends soon find his impossible destiny may not be so impossible after all. His magic comes from the spirit of a dragon he meets in the forests near Set-Ai's village.
Featured in the Spellbinder & Dragon Quartets, the Elidor Trilogy, and the Suncatcher Trilogy.

=== Other main characters ===
Maddoc
Maddoc is the black-robed wizard that set in motion the events that brought all of the characters together. Willing to do anything—and use anyone—in his quest to learn more about magic, he was at first seen as a villain. Later, he became an ally to the heroes—though how long that will last remains to be seen ... He takes Sindri as an apprentice and tries to teach him magic.
Featured in the Spellbinder & Dragon Quartets , the" Elidor Trilogy ", and the Suncatcher Trilogy.

Jirah
Jirah is the overlooked younger sister of Nearra. Told by their father that she was destined to be the one to break their family curse and become a great wizard, she was devastated to learn that it was in fact Nearra who held this destiny. Though at first determined to steal this destiny from her sister, Jirah now works to discover who she is meant to be while escaping the shadow cast by her older sister.
Featured in the Dragon Quartet , the Trinistyr Trilogy , and the Elements Trilogy.

Rina
Rinalasha Lelaynar is Elidor's younger sister. Despite being fully Silvanesti and being raised to despise her half-breed older brother, she took it upon herself to seek him out and learn who he truly was before passing judgment. Instead, she found herself traveling with Davyn, and the two have since become inseparable. When she discovers Elidor is dead, she takes it upon herself to avenge his death and kill the one who 'murdered' him.
Featured in the Dragon Quartet , and the Elidor Trilogy , and the Trinistyr Trilogy , and the Suncatcher Trilogy.

Rohawn
Rohawn, originally a squire to the knight, Corrigan, a brilliant strategist, but upon losing his knight to an evil power mad elf wizard, Gieden, Rohawn continues his training under Catriona. He meets Rina, and starts to like her more and more, but doesn't admit it before she leaves the group. Rohawn uses the famous Scotsman blade the Claymore.
Featured in the Elidor Trilogy , and the Goodlund Trilogry.

Kaja and Kelethe
The twin sisters are from Elidor's town, and join the fight to keep Elidor from dying, again. Originally on Elidor's side, Kaja, a priestess, betrays him to get revenge on the Northern Star, and rejoins the group. Kelethe, a bard wielding a rapier, stays with the group, and helps them until the shocking ending of the Elidor Trilogy.
Featured in the Elidor Trilogy.

Oddvar
Maddoc's number one man, well dwarf, he chases Maddoc's stepson, Davyn, until, he leaves to work odd jobs before enlisted in Davyn's party to lead them to the Dragon Knight.
Featured in the Spellbinders Quartet , and the Dragon Knight.

Goblin Man
Maddoc's old friend, also a black mage, but of a lesser stat, he too helped in the study of Asvoria, but more on her shape shifter Ophion. While trying to become a shape shifter, he underwent many failing experiments with goblins, finally giving up he remained in solitude as the goblin man, keeping little contact with Maddoc.
Featured in the Dragon Spell , and the Suncatcher Trilogy.

Icefire
A singing captain mage, who has links to past wizards, and a power mad elf after godhood. He will help Nearra, in her quest to restore power to the Trinistyr. But not without many quarrels with Davyn.
Featured in the Trinystyr Trilogy.

Bem and Tu
Icefire's first and second mates, they are also brother and sister, the strong and capable fighter, Bem is always ready for pirates, or any other obstacle they meet on the ocean. Tu, a strong willed, and beautiful warrior, captains the ship through most of the Trinistyr Trilogy.
Featured in the Trinystyr Trilogy.

Raedon
A copper dragon who fights with an evil dragon named Slean, and helps Nearra and the group reach the holy temple of stars, also fights Asvoria, before his soul is shattered by Asvoria's shape shifter, and body possessed by Asvoria.
Featured in the spellbinders , and the Dragon Quartet.

Slean
An evil green dragon, who causes the group many troubles, during their journey to the holy temple of stars. This green dragon breathes deadly chlorine gas.
Featured in the Spellbinders Quartet.

Vael
Elidor's love, who is the only champion of Elidor's home town. She fights alongside Elidor, before being poisoned by an evil lich elf mage.
Featured in the Dragon Sword , and the Elidor Trilogy.

Set-ai
An age old warrior, he trains Davyn and the group how to fight better. He teaches Elidor how to barely use a bow, Catriona to use dragonclaws, and Davyn to become a better shot and leader. In a later book his left arm is amputated in order for him to stay alive.
Featured in the Dragon Well , and the Dragon Knight .

Keene Waverider
Like most kender he is charming, sly, and in his mind totally innocent. He is great friends with Icefire and rides boats with him. He loves adventures (like most kender in their Wanderlust stage). Keene becomes even closer with Jirah and shows her just how much he cares.
Featured in the Trinystyr Tilogy.

Koi Fearbreaker
This kender is different and yet the same. She realizes that the kender lack of fear is what kills most kender. She wants to be able to be afraid. She has battled a dragon, stolen from it after waking it up, and gets upset when she isn't scared. Nearra and company try to help her out. She is engaged to Sindri.
Featured in the Elements Trilogy.

Erikoff
He is an orange robed mage who is devoted to Catriona and her gang or friends. He isn't a great and famous mage...yet... He has the power of fire. What this mage doesn't know is that he is part of an evil plot.
Featured in the Goodlund Tilogy.

Tayt
A young girl who originally did not possess magic. She gained her magical ability from an artifact that grants the user magic. However, without the necklace, the user would be unable to perform any magic. Tayt, had to start over with a gift of magic from a dragon.
Featured in the Suncatcher Trilogy.

Alric
The heir to the ghost city Arngrim. On their journey, Nearra, Dayvn, Elidor Catriona, and Sindri are invited into the city by Alric. Catriona finds herself captivated by the young prince's charms, as he is by her. Sadly, Alric is lost in a magical vortex while trying to save the companions (but particularly Catriona's) lives.
Featured in The Dying City.

== Background ==
Author Tim Waggoner said that Wizards of the Coast wanted to start a new young adult series of books in the Dragonlance world, but did not know any authors who wrote that genre. They selected him because he had previously written young adult short stories. Waggoner was given significant creative control, and designed most of the overarching story for the series.
