= Return of the Sorceress =

2004 novel by Tim Waggoner

- Cover of the first edition
- Author: Tim Waggoner
- Cover artist: Vinod Rams
- Language: English
- Genre: Fantasy novel
- Published: 2004
- Publication place: United States
- Media type: Print
- ISBN: 0-7869-3385-2

Return of the Sorceress is a fantasy novel by Tim Waggoner published in November 2004, and set in the world of Dragonlance, and based on the Dungeons & Dragons role-playing game. It is the fourth novel set in the "New Adventures" series.

== Premise ==
Nearra and her friends plan to confront the wizard Maddoc.
