= Ethnos =

Ethnos (Greek: ἔθνος, lit. 'nation') may refer to:

- Ethnicity, the common characteristics of a group of people
- Ethnos (newspaper), a Greek newspaper
- Ethnos (game), a board game by CMON Limited
