= Emily Webb =

Emily Webb may refer to:

- Emily Webb, character in the 1938 play Our Town by Thornton Wilder and adaptations:
  - Our Town (1940 film)
  - Our Town (Producers' Showcase), 1955
  - Our Town (2003 film)
  - Our Town (opera), 2006
- Emily Webb, character in the 2011 book Vesper (novel)

== See also ==
- Emily (disambiguation)
- Webb (disambiguation)
