= CMON Limited =

Chinese miniatures and board game company

- Company type: Public Corporation
- Traded as: SEHK: 1792
- ISIN: KYG223911093
- Industry: Miniature wargaming and Board game publisher
- Founded: 2001; 25 years ago
- Headquarters: Singapore
- Key people: Chern Ann Ng (CEO), David Doust (co-founder)
- Revenue: US$17 million (2015)
- Subsidiaries: CMON Inc
- Website: www.cmon.com

CMON Limited, formerly known as CoolMiniOrNot is a publicly listed miniatures and board game publisher, trading on the Hong Kong Stock Exchange. It also operates a miniatures related site coolminiornot.com that features user submitted images of their painted models for voting.

== History ==
CoolMiniOrNot was founded as a community site for posting images of painted miniatures, inspired by Hot or Not style dating sites.

It later began publishing board games and miniature games, notable titles include Super Dungeon Explore in 2011 and Zombicide in 2012.

Some of its games are critically acclaimed, with three games (Xenoshyft, Rum and Bones and Blood Rage) making The Dice Tower's top 10 games of 2015.

On December 2, 2016, CMON Limited began publicly trading on the GEM board of the Hong Kong Stock Exchange.

CMON published Ethnos in 2017.

== Crowdsourcing activity ==
CoolMiniOrNot had used Kickstarter with relative success occupying several places in the Most Funded Tabletop Games category. The total amount raised through Kickstarter was $108,628,027. In 2024, the company moved its crowdsourcing platform exclusively to the Gamefound platform.

== Kickstarter Campaigns ==
| Total USD | Project name | % funded | Backers | Closing date |
|---|---|---|---|---|
| 781,597 | Zombicide | 3,907 | 5,258 | 2012-05-06 |
| 951,254 | Sedition Wars: Battle for Alabaster | 4,756 | 4,278 | 2012-06-30 |
| 909,537 | Relic Knights | 4,547 | 3,459 | 2012-09-09 |
| 116,938 | Guilds of Cadwallon | 2,338 | 2,955 | 2012-12-22 |
| 582,316 | Rivet Wars | 2,329 | 2,464 | 2013-02-04 |
| 2,225,018 | Zombicide: Season 2 | 9,020 | 8,844 | 2013-03-31 |
| 356,752 | Kaosball | 1,896 | 1,427 | 2013-06-30 |
| 718,152 | Wrath of Kings | 1,435 | 3,756 | 2013-09-15 |
| 774,222 | Arcadia Quest | 1,548 | 4,885 | 2014-03-16 |
| 66,703 | Dogs of War | 266 | 1,139 | 2014-05-10 |
| 242,832 | XenoShyft Onslaught | 971 | 3,367 | 2014-06-19 |
| 2,849,064 | Zombicide: Season 3 | 2,849 | 12,011 | 2014-07-28 |
| 101,351 | The World of Smog | 405 | 1,770 | 2014-11-09 |
| 739,513 | Rum & Bones | 1,479 | 4,417 | 2014-12-29 |
| 905,682 | Blood Rage | 1811 | 9,825 | 2015-03-18 |
| 567,350 | B-Sieged: Sons of the Abyss | 1,134 | 4,744 | 2015-05-25 |
| 4,078,954 | Zombicide: Black Plague | 3,263 | 20,913 | 2015-07-06 |
| 1,464,489 | The Others: 7 sins | 1,464 | 10,136 | 2015-10-06 |
| 1,710,714 | Arcadia Quest:Inferno | 1,710 | 9,991 | 2015-12-08 |
| 383,407 | XenoShyft: Dreadmire | 1,278 | 4,398 | 2016-01-31 |
| 1,010,959 | Masmorra: Dungeons of Arcadia | 1,684 | 10,862 | 2016-03-08 |
| 917,864 | Rum & Bones: Second Tide | 1,147 | 5,794 | 2016-04-28 |
| 3,560,643 | Massive Darkness | 1,780 | 22,361 | 2016-07-07 |
| 1,174,130 | The World of SMOG: Rise of Moloch | 1,677 | 7,892 | 2017-02-03 |
| 4,228,060 | Rising Sun | 1,409 | 31,262 | 2017-04-04 |
| 5,004,614 | Zombicide: Green Horde | 1,668 | 27,236 | 2017-06-27 |
| 1,690,466 | A Song of Ice and Fire: Tabletop Miniatures Game | 563 | 9,040 | 2017-08-15 |
| 1,469,489 | HATE | 734 | 10,227 | 2018-02-07 |
| 3,352,208 | Zombicide: Invader | 1,340 | 18,486 | 2018-05-03 |
| 316,018 | Arcadia Quest: Riders | 1,053 | 5,272 | 2018-05-25 |
| 2,412,286 | Cthulhu: Death May Die | 1,206 | 15,831 | 2018-07-24 |
| 935,956 | Starcadia Quest | 468 | 6,503 | 2018-09-11 |
| 634,782 | Project: Elite | 635 | 5,367 | 2018-11-12 |
| 4,013,731 | Bloodborne: The Board Game | 2,007 | 23,986 | 2019-05-14 |
| 1,492,714 | Trudvang: Legends | 746 | 11,808 | 2019-07-15 |
| 3,410,084 | Zombicide: 2nd Edition | 1,363 | 21,735 | 2019-11-06 |
| 430,154 | Night of the Living Dead: A Zombicide Game | 2,150 | 6,318 | 2019-12-18 |
| 2,866,358 | Marvel United | 1,910 | 21,291 | 2020-03-05 |
| 3,320,196 | Ankh | 1,107 | 23,386 | 2020-05-05 |
| 3,813,274 | Massive Darkness 2: Hellscape | 1,270 | 21,763 | 2020-08-26 |
| 3,310,872 | Zombicide: Undead or Alive | 2,207 | 21,160 | 2021-03-11 |
| 5,988,089 | Marvel United: X-Men | 1,995 | 25,404 | 2021-05-05 |
| 2,046,517 | Masters of the Universe: The Board Game - Clash For Eternia | 1,023 | 8,166 | 2021-10-01 |
| 9,032,583 | Marvel Zombies - A Zombicide Game | 1,807 | 28,974 | 2022-02-03 |
| 886,783 | Cyberpunk 2077: Gangs of Night City - The Board Game | 887 | 6,345 | 2022-07-06 |
| 1,334,501 | Dune: War for Arrakis | 1,335 | 11,449 | 2022-09-22 |
| 3,426,673 | Cthulhu: Death May Die - Fear of the Unknown | 1,713 | 21,337 | 2022-11-09 |
| 4,787,626 | Marvel United: Multiverse | 2,394 | 20,886 | 2023-02-08 |
| 3,839,614 | Zombicide: White Death | 1,920 | 19,303 | 2023-04-26 |
| 669,976 | Mordred | 670 | 5,687 | 2023-07-27 |
| 2,564,789 | DCeased | 855 | 12,787 | 2023-12-01 |

== Gamefound Campaigns ==
| Total USD | Project name | % funded | Backers | Closing date |
|---|---|---|---|---|
| 1,886,510 | A Song of Ice & Fire: Tactics - A Tabletop Miniatures Skirmish Game | 629 | 6,406 | 2024-02-22 |
| 832,945 | God of War: The Board Game | 555 | 4,388 | 2024-05-02 |
| 339,743 | Degenesis: Clan Wars | 340 | 1,232 | 2024-06-07 |
| 4,478,990 | DC Super Heroes United | 2,239 | 14,040 | 2024-07-31 |
| 3,756,395 | Massive Darkness: Dungeons of Shadowreach | 1,142 | 10,598 | 2025-02-22 |
| 3,912,410 | Cthulhu: Death May Die - Forbidden Reaches | 1,304 | 13,152 | 2025-04-14 |

== Other activity ==
=== Tabletopgamingnews.com ===
CoolMiniOrNot acquired Tabletopgamingnews.com in 2011 and currently operates it.

=== Ravage USA ===
CoolMiniOrNot publishes the English language edition of Ravage magazine.

=== Crystal Brush painting competition ===
The company also organizes an annual miniature figure painting competition with a cash purse of $10,000, $2,000 and $1,000 for the overall winners. The competition has guest judges which account for 50% of the total score, with a 12-hour Internet vote making up the remaining 50%.
