= Zombicide =

Board game

- Zombicide logo
- Designers: Raphaël Guiton; Jean-Baptiste Lullien; Nicolas Raoult
- Illustrators: Nicolas Fructus; Édouard Guiton; Mathieu Harlaut; Eric Nouhaut
- Publishers: Asmodee; Asterion Press; Black Monk; CoolMiniOrNot; Edge Entertainment; Galápagos Jogos; Guillotine Games; Hobby World
- Publication: 2012
- Players: 1 to 6
- Setup time: approx. 5 minutes
- Playing time: A game lasts for 20 minutes (beginner board) to 3 hours (expert board).
- Chance: Dice rolling
- Skills: strategic thinking

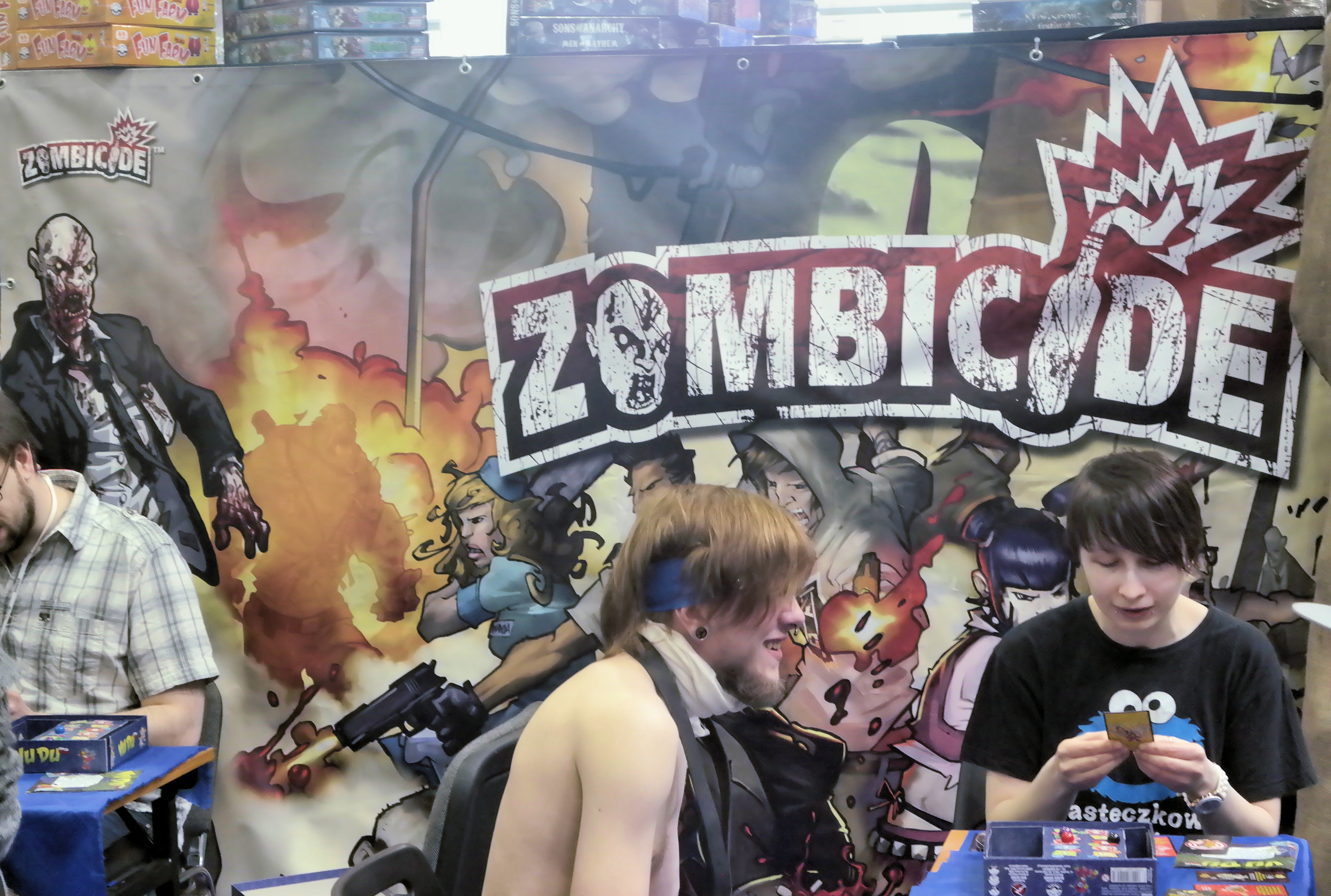
Zombicide at Pyrkon, Poznań 2015

Zombicide, is a collaborative adventure board game with a modern zombie theme, created by Guillotine Games. It was launched on Kickstarter by publisher CoolMiniOrNot and raised $781,597 from 5,258 backers.

In the game, each player controls from one (for 6 players) to four (solo game) "survivors", human beings in a zombie-infested town. In fact, "survivors" hastily change to "hunters" to smash zombies through and through. However, the team must keep the balance between survival and slaughter: as the zombicide's going on, the "danger level" is going up and infected are growing in numbers.

== Gameplay ==
Each player in the game represents one or more survivors in a zombie apocalypse. Their goal is to complete the scenario objects dictated by their particular mission before being overrun by zombies. The game board represents a zombie-infested town, with large square tiles, laid according to the mission selected.

Before the beginning of the game, a mission is chosen. The playing area is built with board tiles and features (icons representing buildings, doors and objectives) according to the selected mission. Each players chooses one or more survivors to play and everyone places their survivors on the starting area of the board.

A deck of zombie cards, which will be used to spawn zombies, is placed on the side of the board. The game starts after the group decides who will be the first player. In the game, time flows in “turns”, and each turn is composed of three “phases”.

In the first phase, the survivors perform their actions. They can move, attack and interact with inventory items. During their phase, players can trade items, move, kill zombies or perform other tasks to help their objective. They can also discuss strategies to triumph over the zombies. Also each survivor starts the game with a different zombie-fighting special ability. These special abilities grow as the survivor gains experience from defeating zombies and completing objectives during the game. After the first survivor completes their actions, the turn passes to the next survivor.

After each survivor has completed a turn of actions, the second phase begins. This "zombies phase" is completed by moving and attacking survivors with all the zombies on the board. These moves and attacks are programmed by the game mechanics, and are therefore completely predictable.

Finally comes the end phase, when tokens are managed, a new first players is determined, and another turn begins.

Throughout the game, survivors may collect better items and gain experience to help them kill more zombies and accomplish their mission.

If the players are able to complete all objectives, they are winners and may proceed to the following scenario. If, on the other hand, the zombies kill all survivors, the game is lost.

== Development ==
Zombicide was funded on Kickstarter, with the subsequent franchise funding $34,505,398 combined on Kickstarter as of 2 February 2022.

== Products ==
The game has been expanded to several settings and spin-off games. All settings and spin-off games feature significantly different mechanics. The game is designed for every product for each setting/spin-off game to be easily mixed, but not to be mixed across settings/spin-offs. Below is a list of all released content for each of the settings and spin-off games, sorted by their SKU.

=== Modern Zombicide ===
SKU	Title	Release	Type	Includes	Notes
GUG001	Zombicide	2012	Core Game	6 survivors, 65 zombies	
GUG002	Nick the Bad Cop	2012	Figure Pack	1 survivor	
GUG003	El Cholo	2012	Figure Pack	1 survivor	
GUG004	Dave the Geek	2012	Figure Pack	1 survivor	
GUG005	9 Double Sided Game Tiles	2012	Accessory	9 game tiles	
GUG006					
GUG007	Survivors & Zombivors #1	2012	Figure Pack	3 survivors	
GUG008	Claudia the Rebel	2012	Figure Pack	1 survivor	
GUG009	Ivy the Hitgirl	2012	Figure Pack	1 survivor	
GUG010	Eva the Artist	2012	Figure Pack	1 survivor	
GUG011	Marvin the Bodyguard	2012	Figure Pack	1 survivor	
GUG012					
GUG013	Box of Zombies Set #1: Walk of the Dead	2013	Figure Pack	24 zombies	
GUG014	Toxic City Mall	2013	Expansion	4 survivors, 29 zombies	
GUG015	Box of Zombies Set #2: Toxic Crowd	2013	Figure Pack	24 zombies	
GUG016	Prison Outbreak	2013	Core Game	6 survivors, 78 zombies	
GUG017	Box of Zombies Set #3: Angry Zombies	2013	Figure Pack	24 zombies	
GUG018	Box of Zombies Set #4: Walk of the Dead 2	2013	Figure Pack	24 zombies	
GUG019	Box of Zombies Set #5: Zombie Dogz	2013	Figure Pack	20 zombies	
GUG020	Box of Dogs Set #6: Dog Companions	2013	Figure Pack	6 companions	
GUG021	9 Prison Outbreak Game Tiles	2013	Accessory	9 game tiles	
GUG022	4 Toxic City Mall Game Tiles	2013	Accessory	4 game tiles	
GUG023	Special Guest: Kevin Walker	2013	Figure Pack	2 survivors	
GUG024	Special Guest: Adrian Smith	2013	Figure Pack	2 survivors	
GUG025	Special Guest: Karl Kopinski	2013	Figure Pack	2 survivors	
GUG026	Dakota the Convict	2013	Figure Pack	1 survivor	
GUG027	Lea the Teenager	2013	Figure Pack	1 survivor	
GUG028	Adriana the Shopgirl	2013	Figure Pack	1 survivor	
GUG029	Rick the Stunt Man	2013	Figure Pack	1 survivor	
GUG030	Fred the Trader	2013	Figure Pack	1 survivor	
GUG031	Will the Game Designer	2013	Figure Pack	1 survivor	
GUG032	Survivors & Zombivors #2	2013	Figure Pack	5 survivors	
GUG033	Skull Trackers	2013	Accessory	10 experience trackers	
GUG034	Orange Dice	2013	Accessory	6 orange dice	
GUG035	Red Dice	2013	Accessory	6 red dice	
GUG036	Gaming Night #1: Cars, Food or Guns	2014	Game Night Kit	1 survivor	
GUG037	Helen the Federal Agent	2013	Figure Pack	1 survivor	
GUG038	Moustache Pack	2013	Figure Pack	3 survivors	
GUG039	Gaming Night #2: Black Friday	2014	Game Night Kit	1 survivor	
GUG040	Alyana Heska aka Elena	2014	Figure Pack	1 survivor	
GUG041	Kyoko the Free Spirit	2014	Figure Pack	1 survivor	Included in GUG036
GUG042	Survivors & Zombivors #3	2013	Figure Pack	6 survivors	
GUG043	Union Worker #42 aka Charles	2014	Figure Pack	1 survivor	
GUG044	Gaming Night #3: Zombie Trap	2014	Game Night Kit	1 survivor	
GUG045	Gaming Night #4: Tric & Trac	2014	Game Night Kit	1 survivor	
GUG046	Ross the Manager	2013	Figure Pack	1 survivor	
GUG047	Compendium #1	2014	Accessory	1 scenario book	
GUG048	Rue Morgue	2015	Core Game	12 survivors, 80 zombies	
GUG049	Thiago the Prince	2014	Figure Pack	1 survivor	Included in GUG039
GUG050	Bill the Prison Director	2014	Figure Pack	1 survivor	Included in GUG044
GUG051					
GUG052	Red Storage Box	2015	Accessory	1 storage box	
GUG053	Blue Storage Box	2015	Accessory	1 storage box	
GUG054	Green Storage Box	2015	Accessory	1 storage box	
GUG055	Angry Neighbors	2015	Expansion	4 survivors, 8 companions, 18 zombies	
GUG056	Box of Zombies Set #7: Lost Zombivors	2015	Figure Pack	12 zombivors	
GUG057	Team Building Deck	2015	Accessory	114 team building cards	Included in GUG-KS03
GUG058	Yellow Dice	2015	Accessory	6 yellow dice	Included in GUG-KS03
GUG059	Special Guest: Miguel Coimbra	2015	Figure Pack	2 survivors	
GUG060	Special Guest: Paolo Parente	2015	Figure Pack	2 survivors	
GUG061	Special Guest: Lucio Parrillo	2015	Figure Pack	2 survivors	
GUG062	Special Guest: Edouard Guiton	2015	Figure Pack	2 survivors	
GUG063	Box of Zombies Set #8: Murder of Crowz	2015	Figure Pack	15 zombies	
GUG064	9 Rue Morgue Game Tiles	2015	Accessory	9 game tiles	
GUG065	3 Angry Neighbors Game Tiles	2015	Accessory	3 game tiles	
GUG066	3D Pack	2015	Accessory	69 doors, 2 barricades	
GUG067	Plastic Token Pack	2015	Accessory	74 plastic tokens	
GUG068	Box of Zombies Set #9: VIP#1 Very Infected People	2015	Figure Pack	20 zombies	
GUG069	Box of Zombies Set #10: VIP#2 Very Infected People	2015	Figure Pack	20 zombies	
GUG070	Ultimate Survivors #1	2015	Figure Pack	6 survivors	
GUG071	Brown Dice	2015	Accessory	6 brown dice	Included in GUG-KS03
GUG072	Special Guest: John Kovalic	2015	Figure Pack	4 survivors	
GUG073	Moustache Pack #2	2015	Figure Pack	3 survivors	
GUG074	Patrick the Hipster	2015	Figure Pack	1 survivor	
GUG075	Oksana the Stunt Woman	2015	Figure Pack	1 survivor	
GUG076	Benny the Children's Performer	2015	Figure Pack	1 survivor	
GUG077	Nikki the Gator Wrangler	2015	Figure Pack	1 survivor	
GUG078	Curro the Bookmaker	2015	Figure Pack	1 survivor	
GUG079	Kris the Repo Man	2015	Figure Pack	1 survivor	
GUG080	Miss Trish the Kindergarten Teacher	2015	Figure Pack	1 survivor	
GUG081	Audrey the Bookworm	2015	Figure Pack	1 survivor	Included in GUG-KS03
GUG082					
GUG083					
GUG084					
GUG085					
GUG086	White Dice	2012	Accessory	6 white dice	
GUG087	Black Dice	2012	Accessory	6 black dice	Included in GUG-KS01
GUG088	Glow in the Dark Dice	2012	Accessory	6 glow in the dark dice	Included in GUG-KS01
GUG089	Gaming Night #5: Bluehand Protocol	2015	Game Night Kit	2 survivors	
GUG090	Ultimate Survivors #2	2016	Figure Pack	8 survivors	
GUG091	Compendium #2	2016	Accessory	1 scenario book	
GUG-KS01	Abomination Pack	2012	Stretch Goals Pack	31 zombies	
GUG-KS02	Fugitive Pack	2013	Stretch Goals Pack	31 zombies	
GUG-KS03	Infected Pack	2015	Stretch Goals Pack	9 survivors, 54 zombies	
TMNT PACK-1	Teenage Mutant Ninja Turtles Pack #1	2019	Figure Pack	4 survivors	
TMNT PACK-2	Teenage Mutant Ninja Turtles Pack #2	2019	Figure Pack	4 survivors	
ZCD-KS13	Comic Book Extras: Day One	2021	Figure Pack	8 survivors	
	M134 Gatling	2016	Promo Card	1 equipment card	
	Ghostbusters Pack #1	2022	Figure Pack	2 survivors, 1 companion, 1 zombie	
	Ghostbusters Pack #2	2022	Figure Pack	2 survivors, 2 zombies	
	Ghostbusters Pack #3	2022	Figure Pack	1 zombie	

=== Fantasy Zombicide ===
SKU	Title	Release	Type	Includes	Notes
GUF001	Black Plague	2016	Core Game	6 survivors, 65 zombies	
GUF002	Wulfsburg	2016	Expansion	4 survivors, 22 zombies	
GUF003	NPC 1: Notorious Plagued Characters	2016	Figure Pack	20 zombies	
GUF004	NPC 2: Notorious Plagued Characters	2016	Figure Pack	20 zombies	
GUF005	Hero Box 1	2016	Figure Pack	5 survivors	
GUF006	Special Guest: Paul Bonner	2016	Figure Pack	4 survivors	
GUF007	Special Guest: Carl Critchlow	2016	Figure Pack	3 survivors, 1 zombie	
GUF008	Special Guest: Karl Kopinski	2016	Figure Pack	4 survivors	
GUF009	Special Guest: Stefan Kopinski	2016	Figure Pack	4 survivors	
GUF010	Special Guest: Naïade	2016	Figure Pack	4 survivors	
GUF011	Special Guest: Edouard Guiton	2016	Figure Pack	4 survivors	
GUF012	Special Guest: Marc Simonetti	2016	Figure Pack	4 survivors	
GUF013	Special Guest: Paolo Parente	2016	Figure Pack	4 survivors	
GUF014	Special Guest: Jovem Nerd	2016	Figure Pack	4 survivors	
GUF015	Special Guest: Adrian Smith	2016	Figure Pack	4 survivors	
GUF016	Special Guest: John Howe	2016	Figure Pack	4 survivors	
GUF017	Special Guest: Neal Adams	2016	Figure Pack	4 survivors	
GUF018	Special Guest: Gipi	2016	Figure Pack	4 survivors	
GUF019	Zombie Bosses: Abomination Pack	2016	Figure Pack	3 zombies	
GUF020	Deadeye Walkers	2016	Figure Pack	21 zombies	
GUF021	Benson	2016	Figure Pack	1 survivor	
GUF022	Homer	2016	Figure Pack	1 survivor	
GUF023					
GUF024	Bone Dice	2016	Accessory	6 bone dice	
GUF025	Red Dice	2016	Accessory	6 red dice	
GUF026	Dice Bag	2016	Accessory	1 dice bag	Included in GUF-KS01
GUF027	Folding Dice Tower	2016	Accessory	1 dice tower	Included in GUF-KS01
GUF028	11 Game Tiles From Black Plague and Wulfsburg	2016	Accessory	11 game tiles	
GUF029	Deck Holder Set	2016	Accessory	4 deck holders	
GUF030	Counter Base Pack	2016	Accessory	27 counter bases	
GUF031	Plastic Token Pack	2016	Accessory	62 plastic tokens	
GUF032	3D Doors	2016	Accessory	27 doors	
GUF033	Murder of Crowz	2016	Figure Pack	15 zombies	
GUF034	Green Horde	2018	Core Game	6 survivors, 65 zombies, 1 siege engine	
GUF035	No Rest for the Wicked	2018	Expansion	33 zombies, 1 dragon, 1 siege engine	
GUF036	Friends and Foes	2018	Expansion	4 survivors, 6 familiars, 19 zombies	
GUF037	Special Guest: Adrian Smith 2	2018	Figure Pack	3 zombies	
GUF038	Special Guest: Paul Bonner 2	2018	Figure Pack	3 zombies	
GUF039	Special Guest: Sean A. Murray	2018	Figure Pack	3 survivors, 1 zombie	
GUF040	Massive Darkness / Green Horde Crossover Kit	2018	Crossover Kit		Massive Darkness cards only
GUF041	14 Game Tiles From Green Horde and Friends and Foes	2018	Accessory	14 game tiles	
GUF042	White Death	2024	Core Game	6 survivors, 12 guards, 65 zombies	
GUF043	Eternal Empire	2024	Expansion	6 survivors, 9 zombies, 3 stautes	
GUF044	Teenage Mutant Ninja Turtles: Zombicide Timecrash	2024	Expansion	7 survivors, 15 foot ninjas, 1 zombie	
GUF045	Divine Beasts	2024	Figure Pack	4 zombies	
GUF046	Climbers & Terrorcotta Walkers	2024	Figure Pack	30 zombies	
GUF047	Crossfire Pack	2024	Figure Pack	15 zombies, 12 guards	
GUF048	Extra Tiles Pack	2024	Accessory	13 game tiles	
GUF-KS01	Huntsman Pack	2016	Stretch Goals Pack	17 survivors, 31 zombies	
GUF-KS02	Knight Pack	2016	Stretch Goals Pack	6 survivors, 3 zombies	
GUF-KS03	Grom and Thalia	2016	Figure Pack	2 survivors	
GUF-KS04	Grin and Scowl	2016	Figure Pack	1 survivor, 1 zombie	Included in GUF-KS02
GUF-KS05	Abominarat and Dr. Stormcrow	2016	Figure Pack	1 survivor, 1 zombie	Included in GUF-KS02
GUF-KS06	Troy and Evil Troy	2016	Figure Pack	2 survivors	Included in GUF-KS01
GUF-KS07	Chauncey and Beauregard	2016	Figure Pack	2 survivors	Included in GUF-KS02
GUF-KS08	Gilbert and Mortimer	2016	Figure Pack	2 survivors	Included in GUF-KS01
GUF-KS09	Bob and Montalban	2016	Figure Pack	2 survivors	Included in GUF-KS01
GUF-KS10	Black Dice	2016	Accessory	6 black dice	Included in GUF-KS01
GUF-KS11	Horde Box	2018	Stretch Goals Pack	31 survivors, 31 zombies, 1 dragon, 1 siege engine	
GUF-KS12	Ultimate Survivors	2018	Figure Pack	6 survivors	
GUF-KS13	Rat King & Swamp Troll	2018	Figure Pack	6 zombie rats, 2 zombies	
GUF-KS14	Green Dice	2018	Accessory	6 green dice	
GUF-KS15	Liam	2018	Figure Pack	1 survivor	
GUF-KS16	North the Halfling	2018	Figure Pack	1 survivor	
GUF-KS17	Fatty Bursters	2018	Figure Pack	4 zombies	
GUF-KS18	3D Plastic Obstacles	2018	Accessory	6 barriers, 6 hedges	
GUF-KS19	3D Plastic Hedges	2018	Accessory	14 hedges	
GUF-KS20	Frozen Fortress	2024	Stretch Goals Pack	69 survivors, 29 zombies	
GUF-KS21	Virtues of Bushido	2024	Figure Pack	7 survivors	
GUF-KS22	Celestial Knights	2024	Figure Pack	5 survivors, 1 guard	
GUF-KS23	Warlords of the Rising Sun	2024	Figure Pack	8 survivors, 1 necromancer	
GUF-KS24	Warlords of the Middle Kingdom	2024	Figure Pack	8 survivors, 2 zombies	
GUF-KS25	Berserker Walkers	2024	Figure Pack	12 zombies	
GUF-KS26	Frost Dice	2024	Accessory	6 dice	
GUF-KS27	Jade Dice	2024	Accessory	6 dice	
GUF-KS33	Usagi Yojimbo	2024	Figure Pack	1 survivor	
GUF-OP01	Game Night Kit 1	2017	Game Night Kit	1 survivor	
GUF-PR01	Erik Summoner	2017	Figure Pack	1 zombie	
GUF-PR02	Willow	2017	Figure Pack	1 survivor	
GUF-PR03					
GUF-PR04					
GUF-PR05					
GUF-PR06	Thundercats Pack #1	2022	Figure Pack	4 survivors	
GUF-PR07	Thundercats Pack #2	2022	Figure Pack	5 survivors	
GUF-PR08	Thundercats Pack #3	2022	Figure Pack	2 zombies	
GUF-PR09	Comic Book Extras: Road to Hell	2024	Figure Pack	12 survivors, 3 zombies	
GUF-PR10	La Compagnia Della Forca	2023	Figure Pack	13 survivors	
ZCD-PR13	Iron Maiden Pack #1	2023	Figure Pack	3 survivors/zombies	
ZCD-PR14	Iron Maiden Pack #2	2023	Figure Pack	2 survivors/zombies	
ZCD-PR15	Iron Maiden Pack #3	2023	Figure Pack	2 zombies	
	B-Sieged / Black Plague Crossover Kit	2016	Accessory	8 survivor ID cards	
	Ice Blast	2016	Promo Card	1 equipment card	
	Massive Darkness / Black Plague Crossover Kit	2017	Accessory	21 survivor ID cards	
GUF-KS	3D Battlements	2024	Accessory	15 battlements	
GUF-KS	Massive Darkness 2 / White Death Crossover Kit	2024	Accessory	28 survivor ID cards, 28 zombie cards	
GUF-KS	Plastic Token Pack	2024	Accessory	101 plastic tokens	

=== Sci-Fi Zombicide ===
SKU	Title	Release	Type	Includes	Notes
ZCS001	Invader	2019	Core Game	6 survivors, 64 xenos, 2 machines	
ZCS002	Black Ops	2019	Expansion	6 survivors, 2 machines, 1 xeno	
ZCS003	Dark Side	2019	Core Game	6 survivors, 64 driller, 2 machines	
ZCS004	Survivors of the Galaxy	2019	Figure Pack	4 survivors, 1 xeno	Included in ZCD-KS01
ZCS005	Invader Tiles Set	2019	Accessory	12 game tiles	
ZCS006	Plastic Token Pack	2019	Accessory	91 plastic tokens	
ZCS007	3D Doors	2019	Accessory	11 doors	
ZCS008	Deck Holder Set	2019	Accessory	4 deck holders	
ZCS-KS01	Civilian Extras	2019	Stretch Goals Pack	37 survivors, 48 xenos	
ZCS-KS02	Soldier Extras	2019	Stretch Goals Pack	4 survivors, 10 xenos	
ZCS-KS03	Dark Side Extras	2019	Stretch Goals Pack	23 xenos, 3 scientists	
ZCS-KS04	Orphans Gang Survivor Pack	2019	Figure Pack	6 survivors	
ZCS-KS05	Kabuki Gang Survivor Pack	2019	Figure Pack	6 survivors	
ZCS-KS06	Plague Gang Survivor Pack	2019	Figure Pack	5 survivors	
ZCS-KS07	Orange Dice	2019	Accessory	6 orange dice	
ZCS-KS08	Blue Dice	2019	Accessory	6 blue dice	
ZCS-KS09	Counter Base Set	2019	Accessory	48 counter bases	
ZCS-KS10	Promo Xenos Pack	2019	Figure Pack	30 xenos	
ZCS-KS11					
ZCS-KS12	Comic Book Extras: Dead Contact	2021	Figure Pack	6 survivors, 1 xeno	
ZCS-PR01	Sister Eva Dean	2019	Figure Pack	1 survivor	
ZCD-PR13	Iron Maiden Pack #1	2023	Figure Pack	2 survivors/zombies	
ZCD-PR14	Iron Maiden Pack #2	2023	Figure Pack	2 survivors/zombies	
	Alone / Zombicide: Invader Crossover Kit	2019	Accessory	4 survivor ID cards	
	Project: Elite / Zombicide: Invader Crossover Kit	2020	Accessory	6 survivor ID cards, 18 xeno cards	
	Comic Book Extras: Playing Prometheus	2024	Figure Pack	5 survivors, 2 xenos, 1 machine	
	Comic Book Extras: Run the Citadel	2024	Figure Pack	5 survivors, 1 xeno, 1 machine	

=== Night of the Living Dead ===
SKU	Title	Release	Type	Includes
NLD001	Night of the Living Dead	2020	Core Game	6 survivors, 54 ghouls
NLD-KS01	Dead of Night	2020	Stretch Goals Pack	4 survivors, 2 ghouls

=== Modern Zombicide, 2nd Edition ===
SKU	Title	Release	Type	Includes	Notes
ZCD001	Zombicide: 2nd Edition	2021	Core Game	12 survivors, 76 zombies	
ZCD002	Washington Z.C.	2021	Expansion	6 survivors, 2 companions	
ZCD003	Fort Hendrix	2021	Expansion	6 survivors, 6 zombies, 1 companion	
ZCD004	Urban Legends: Abomination Pack	2021	Figure Pack	4 zombies	
ZCD005	Chronicles Survivors	2021	Figure Pack	12 survivors	
ZCD006	Travel Zombicide	2021	Core Game	6 survivors, 73 zombies	
ZCD007	Tiles Set: 9 Double-Sided Game Tiles	2021	Accessory	9 game tiles	
ZCD008	Extra Players Upgrade Set	2021	Accessory		
ZCD009	Zombies & Companions Upgrade Kit	2021	Conversion Kit	118 zombie, 14 equipment, and 3 abomination upgraded cards	Included in ZCD014
ZCD010	Special Black & White Dice	2021	Accessory	6 black dice, 6 white dice	
ZCD011	All-Out Dice Pack	2021	Accessory	6 all-out dice	
ZCD012	Zombie Soldiers Set	2021	Figure Pack	6 zombies	
ZCD013	Rio Z Janeiro	2023	Expansion	6 survivors, 6 zombies	
ZCD014	Complete Upgrade Kit	2022	Conversion Kit	118 zombie, 70 ID, 14 equipment, and 3 abomination upgraded cards	Included in ZCD009 & ZCD-KS01
ZCD-KS01	Reboot Box	2021	Stretch Goals Pack	39 survivors, 40 zombies, 124 ID upgraded cards	
ZCD-KS02	Presidential Box: Survivor Pack	2021	Figure Pack	6 survivors	
ZCD-KS03	Gabriel	2021	Figure Pack	1 survivor	
ZCD-KS04	Danny Trejo: Badass Survivor & Zombie Set	2021	Figure Pack	1 survivor, 2 zombies	
ZCD-KS05	Nico	2021	Figure Pack	1 survivor	
ZCD-KS06	Nostalgic Box	2021	Conversion Kit	124 ID, 40 zombie, and 6 equipment upgraded cards	Included in ZCD001 & ZCD-KS01
ZCD-KS07	3D Car Set	2021	Accessory	2 plastic cars	
ZCD-KS08	Silver Metal Dice	2021	Accessory	6 silver metal dice	
ZCD-KS09	Golden Metal Dice	2021	Accessory	6 golden metal dice	
ZCD-KS10	Full Metal Dice Set	2021	Accessory	6 golden metal dice, 6 silver metal dice	
ZCD-KS11	Daily Zombie Spawn Set	2021	Figure Pack	31 zombies	Included in ZCD-KS01
ZCD-KS12					
ZCD-KS13	Comic Book Extras: Day One	2021	Figure Pack	8 survivors	
ZCD-PR02	Supernatural: Join the Hunt Pack #1	2023	Figure Pack	2 survivors, 2 zombies	
ZCD-PR03	Supernatural: Join the Hunt Pack #2	2023	Figure Pack	3 survivors, 1 zombie	
ZCD-PR04	Supernatural: Join the Hunt Pack #3	2023	Figure Pack	2 survivors, 1 zombie	
ZCD-PR05	Dark Nights Metal Pack #1	2023	Figure Pack	1 survivor, 5 zombies	
ZCD-PR06	Dark Nights Metal Pack #2	2023	Figure Pack	2 survivors/zombies	
ZCD-PR07	Dark Nights Metal Pack #3	2023	Figure Pack	2 survivors/zombies	
ZCD-PR08	Dark Nights Metal Pack #4	2023	Figure Pack	2 survivors/zombies	
ZCD-PR09	Dark Nights Metal Pack #5	2023	Figure Pack	1 zombie	
ZCD-PR10	The Boys Pack #1: The Seven	2023	Figure Pack	7 survivors	
ZCD-PR11	The Boys Pack #2: The Boys	2023	Figure Pack	6 survivors, 1 companion	
ZCD-PR12	The Boys Pack #3: Supe Abominations	2023	Figure Pack	1 zombie	
ZCD-PR13	Iron Maiden Pack #1	2023	Figure Pack	5 survivors/zombies	
ZCD-PR14	Iron Maiden Pack #2	2023	Figure Pack	4 survivors/zombies	
ZCD-PR15	Iron Maiden Pack #3	2023	Figure Pack	2 zombies	
ZCD-PR16	Iron Maiden: Original Eddie	2023	Figure Pack	1 survivor/zombie	
TMNT PACK-1	Teenage Mutant Ninja Turtles Pack #1	2019	Figure Pack	4 survivors	
TMNT PACK-2	Teenage Mutant Ninja Turtles Pack #2	2019	Figure Pack	4 survivors	
	Exploding Dice	2022	Promo Card	1 equipment card	
	Event Pin	2023	Promo Card	1 equipment card	
	Ghostbusters Pack #1	2022	Figure Pack	2 survivors, 1 companion, 1 zombie	
	Ghostbusters Pack #2	2022	Figure Pack	2 survivors, 2 zombies	
	Ghostbusters Pack #3: Stay Puft Abomination	2022	Figure Pack	1 zombie	
	Comic Book Extras: Dead In the Water	2024	Figure Pack	8 survivors, 4 zombies	
ZCD-PR218	Monty Python's Flying Circus	2024	Figure Pack	6 survivors, 15 zombies	
	Monty Python's Flying Circus: Gumby Pack	2024	Figure Pack	6 survivors/companions/zombies	

=== Western Zombicide ===
SKU	Title	Release	Type	Includes
ZCW001	Undead or Alive	2022	Core Game	14 survivors, 73 zombies, 1 gatling gun
ZCW002	Gears & Guns	2022	Expansion	10 survivors, 1 zombie
ZCW003	Running Wild	2022	Figure Pack	6 survivors, 1 zombie
ZCW-KS01	Dead West	2022	Stretch Goals Pack	51 survivors, 28 zombies
ZCW-KS02	Steampunk Extras	2022	Stretch Goals Pack	9 survivors
ZCW-KS03	Sister Temperance	2022	Figure Pack	1 survivor
ZCW-KS04	Deadstock Abomination Pack	2022	Figure Pack	4 zombies
ZCW-KS05	Long-Dead Walkers	2022	Figure Pack	15 zombies
ZCW-KS06	Special Guest: Paolo Parente	2022	Figure Pack	9 survivors
ZCW-KS07	Abominape vs Crocosaur	2022	Figure Pack	2 zombies
ZCW-KS08	Lone Horse Pack	2022	Figure Pack	6 horses
ZCW-KS09	Special Wooden Dice	2022	Accessory	6 wooden dice
ZCW-KS10	Metal Steam Dice Pack	2022	Accessory	6 metal steam dice
ZCW-KS11	Extra Players Upgrade Pack	2022	Accessory	
ZCW-KS12	Western Tile Set	2022	Accessory	18 game tiles
ZCD-PR13	Iron Maiden Pack #1	2023	Figure Pack	3 survivors/zombies
ZCD-PR14	Iron Maiden Pack #2	2023	Figure Pack	3 survivors/zombies
ZCD-PR15	Iron Maiden Pack #3	2023	Figure Pack	2 zombies
	Duck-Footed Pistol	2022	Promo Card	1 equipment card

=== Marvel Zombies ===
SKU	Title	Release	Type	Includes
MZB001	Heroes' Resistance	2022	Core Game	6 super heroes, 6 zombie heroes, 6 bystanders, 50 zombie standees
MZB002	Marvel Zombies	2022	Core Game	6 super heroes, 6 zombie heroes, 12 bystanders, 63 SHIELD agents
MZB003	X-Men Resistance	2023	Core Game	6 super heroes, 6 zombie heroes, 12 bystanders, 63 zombies
MZB004	Fantastic 4: Under Siege	2023	Expansion	5 super heroes, 7 zombie heroes, 2 bystanders
MZB005	Hydra Resurrection	2023	Expansion	6 super heroes, 6 zombie heroes, 2 bystanders, 14 Hydra troopers, 1 enemy
MZB006	Clash of the Sinister Six	2023	Expansion	8 super heroes, 8 zombie heroes, 2 bystanders
MZB007	Guardians of the Galaxy	2023	Figure Pack	7 super heroes, 5 zombie heroes, 2 bystanders, 1 enemy
MZB008	Extra Dice	2023	Accessory	6 dice
MZB-KS01	Promos	2023	Stretch Goals Pack	46 super heroes, 27 zombie heroes, 9 bystanders
MZB-KS02	Galactus the Devourer	2023	Expansion	1 super hero, 1 zombie hero, 1 enemy
MZB-KS03	Artist's Special Edition Set	2023	Figure Pack	6 super heroes
MZB-KS04	Plastic Tokens	2023	Accessory	66 plastic tokens
MZB-KS05	Tiles Set	2023	Accessory	32 game tiles
MZB-KS06	Sentinel Strike	2023	Expansion	1 super hero, 1 zombie hero, 3 enemies
MZB-KS07	Extra Hydra Troops	2023	Figure Pack	14 Hydra troopers

=== DCeased ===
	DCeased	2025	Core Game	6 super heroes, 6 zombie heroes, 63 horde zombies, 8 bystanders
	Arkham Asylum	2025	Expansion	7 super heroes, 7 zombie heroes, 6 horde zombies, 4 bystanders
	Gotham Knights	2025	Expansion	7 super heroes, 5 zombie heroes, 14 horde zombies, 6 bystanders
	Green Lantern Corpse	2025	Expansion	7 super heroes, 3 zombie heroes
KS	Mother Box	2025	Stretch Goals Pack	36 super heroes, 20 zombie heroes, 10 bystanders
KS	Extra Horde Zombies	2025	Figure Pack	15 horde zombies
KS	Justice Dice Set	2025	Accessories	6 dice
KS	Life Equation Set	2025	Figure Set	3 super heroes, 1 bystander
KS	Shadowpact	2025	Expansion	6 super heroes, 1 horde zombie, 2 bystanders
KS	Tiles Set	2025	Accessories	21 map tiles
KS	Undead Gods	2025	Expansion	6 super heroes, 5 zombie heroes, 14 horde zombies
KS	Unkillables	2025	Expansion	7 super heroes, 4 zombie heroes, 2 bystanders

== Reception ==
TechRaptor stated "The game is fun and challenging if you like cooperative games". An entry from The Encyclopedia of Science Fiction commented on the "complex gameplay" and difficulty. The writer Esther MacCallum-Stewart also praised the digital application that "greatly aids gameplay".

== Awards ==
2013
As d'Or - Jeu de l'Année - Nominee
Golden Geek Best Thematic Board Game - Nominee
Le Lys Passioné - Finalist
Ludo Award Best Board Game Editor's Choice - Winner
Ludo Award Best Board Game Popular - Winner
Tric Trac - Finalist

== Tie-in Fiction ==
Several media tie-in novels of the game were published by Aconyte Books. The first novel based on the game was Last Resort by Josh Reynolds, followed by Planet Havoc by Tim Waggoner and Age of the Undead by C.L. Werner.
