= Temple of the Dragonslayer =

2004 fantasy novel by Tim Waggoner

Cover art by Vinod Rams, 2004

Temple of the Dragonslayer (ISBN 0-7869-3321-6) is a young adult fantasy novel by Tim Waggoner published by in July 2004 by Mirrorstone Books. The novel, the first in the Dragonlance: The New Adventures series, is set in the fantasy role-playing game world of Dragonlance used in Dungeons & Dragons.

== Plot summary ==
Awakening with no memory of who she is, a seemingly normal peasant girl named Nearra finds herself lost in the woods with no clue how she came to arrive there. She soon befriends several other young adventurers, who vow to help her solve the mystery of her lost memories, and why someone apparently wants her dead. She decides to travel to an ancient temple, hoping the clerics there can restore her memory.

== Publication history ==
The Dragonlance setting was first published by TSR in 1984. In 2001, Wizards of the Coast (WotC) licensed Sovereign Press to publish further Dragonlance game materials. This began with the newly revised Dragonlance Campaign Setting in 2003, which used the new Dungeons & Dragons 3rd Edition rules. Marketing support for this new setting included a series of eight novels titled Dragonlance: The New Adventures published by Mirrorstone Books, WotC's young adult imprint, between July 2004 and July 2005.

The first novel in the series was Temple of the Dragonslayer by Tim Waggoner, published in 2004, with interior and cover art by Vinod Rams.

== Reception ==
The review site Into the Nebula found the novel's plot "simplistic", and that "the characters are interesting but lack a motivational depth". The reviewer concluded that although the novel ticked the usual boxes of fantasy literature, it did not have the same "real heart and charm" of the original War of the Lance novels that had been published twenty years before.
