= Vinod Rams =

American artist

- Known for: Fantasy art

Vinod Rams is an American artist whose work has appeared in role-playing games.

== Early life and education ==
Vinod Rams attended the College for Creative Studies in Detroit, Michigan. He did product design at the Franklin Mint in Philadelphia, Pennsylvania.

== Career ==
Vinod Rams did freelance fantasy art for Wizards of the Coast before working at Raven Software in Madison, Wisconsin. He did the cover and interior art for Dragonlance: The New Adventures. He was an illustrator for various supplements to the Star Wars Roleplaying Game, including Geonosis and the Outer Rim Worlds, Galactic Campaign Guide, Ultimate Adversaries, and Jedi Academy Training Manual.

His work also includes the illustrations for the 2004 children's book Temple of the Dragon-slayer, with text by Tim Waggoner. In 2013, he created the cover art for the role-playing game Edara: A Steampunk Renaissance.

Rams is married to fellow artist Emily Fiegenschuh.
