= Vesper (novel) =

2011 young adult novel by Jeff Sampson

Vesper: A Deviants Novel
- Cover of Vesper
- Author: Jeff Sampson
- Cover artist: Ali Smith
- Language: English
- Series: Deviants series
- Genre: Young adult, paranormal, science fiction, mystery
- Publisher: Balzer + Bray / HarperCollins
- Publication date: January 25, 2011
- Publication place: United States
- Media type: Print (Hardcover) e-Book
- Pages: 304 (Hardcover)
- ISBN: 978-0-06-199276-6
- Followed by: Havoc: A Deviants Novel

Vesper is a young adult paranormal novel by Jeff Sampson, published by Balzer + Bray, an imprint of HarperCollins Children's Books, in January 2011. It is the first book in the Deviants series.

== Plot ==
Vesper follows the character of Emily Webb, a geeky girl that is more likely to stay at home and watch old horror films than go to parties. Unbeknownst to her, she's been sneaking out to go to parties and thrill seek when Emily thought she was asleep. She first takes notice of her nocturnal activities when one of her classmates that shares her name has been found murdered. Despite her attempts to prevent herself from going out, Emily's other self keeps going out and getting wilder with each passing night. This other Emily is not only wilder, but stronger and faster than her normal self. As Emily tries to figure out what's going on with her, she discovers that she's not the only person that's changing as well.

== Characters ==
- Emily Webb: The main character, a geeky girl who loves to read and watch horror movies.
- Emily Cooke: A classmate of Emily Webb that was rich, popular, pretty, and artistic before she was murdered.
- Megan Reed: Emily Webb's best friend. Due to her being tricked by one of the popular girls, she's bitter towards the popular crowd.
- Dawn Michaels: Emily Webb's pretty older stepsister.
- Jared Miller: An attractive police deputy who is also the drummer in Lucas’ band. E
- Patrick Kelly: A mysterious new student at Carver high that Emily finds herself drawn to.
- F. Savage: The only known name of Emily's interviewer in the interspersed Vesper Company interrogations.

== Reception ==
Critical reception for Vesper has been positive, with Booklist calling it "smart and good-humored". Kirkus Reviews wrote that the book was "intriguing", praising Emily's personality. The School Library Journal praised Sampson's first person narrative, citing Emily's "transformation into a confident young woman" as one of the strong points of the novel. Publishers Weekly stated that the book's " cliffhanger ending should leave readers eager for the next book".
