= Jeff Sampson =

American writer

- Born: July 15, 1982 (age 44); Nuremberg, Germany
- Occupations: Young Adult and children's author
- Writing career
- Genres: Fantasy, Science fiction, Young adult fiction, Children's literature
- Website: www.jeffsampsonbooks.com

Jeff Sampson is a young adult and children's author. He was born on a U.S. military base in Nuremberg, Germany on July 15, 1982. He started writing professionally at age eighteen. His first books were packaged series fiction. When Sampson was twenty-two, he had his first novel published as part of the Dragonlance series of fantasy novels. He since went on to write many original young adult and children's series, including Monster Slayers under the pen name Lukas Ritter for Wizards of the Coast; Deviants for Balzer + Bray, an imprint of HarperCollins Children’s Books; and The Last Dogs under the pen name Christopher Holt for Little, Brown Books for Young Readers. Jeff Sampson lives in Seattle, Washington in the United States.

== Bibliography ==
The Last Dogs: (as Christopher Holt)

- The Vanishing (September 2012)
- Dark Waters (June 2013)
- The Long Road (November 2013)
- Journey's End (June 2014)

=== Deviants ===
- Vesper (January 2011)
- Havoc (January 2012)
- Ravage (January 2013)

=== Monster Slayers ===
(as Lukas Ritter)

- Monster Slayers (May 2010)
- Monster Slayers: Unleashed (May 2011)
- Monster Slayers: Training Day (Short story, Wizards of the Coast website, April 2010)

=== Dragonlance: The New Adventures ===
- Dragon Quartet, Vol. 8: Dragon Spell (July 2005)
- Trinistyr Trilogy, Vol. 2: Wizard's Betrayal (January 2006)
- Suncatcher Trilogy, Vol. 1: The Wayward Wizard (September 2006)
- Suncatcher Trilogy, Vol. 2: The Ebony Eye (March 2007)
- Suncatcher Trilogy, Vol. 3: The Stolen Sun (September 2007)
