= Ethnos (game) =

Ethnos is a 2017 board game published by CMON Limited.

== Gameplay ==
Ethnos is a game in which players recruit fantastical tribes and strategically form matching bands of allies to dominate regions over multiple ages, earning the most glory to claim victory.

== Reviews ==
- Black Gate
- Rebel Times #133
