= Tim Waggoner =

American novelist

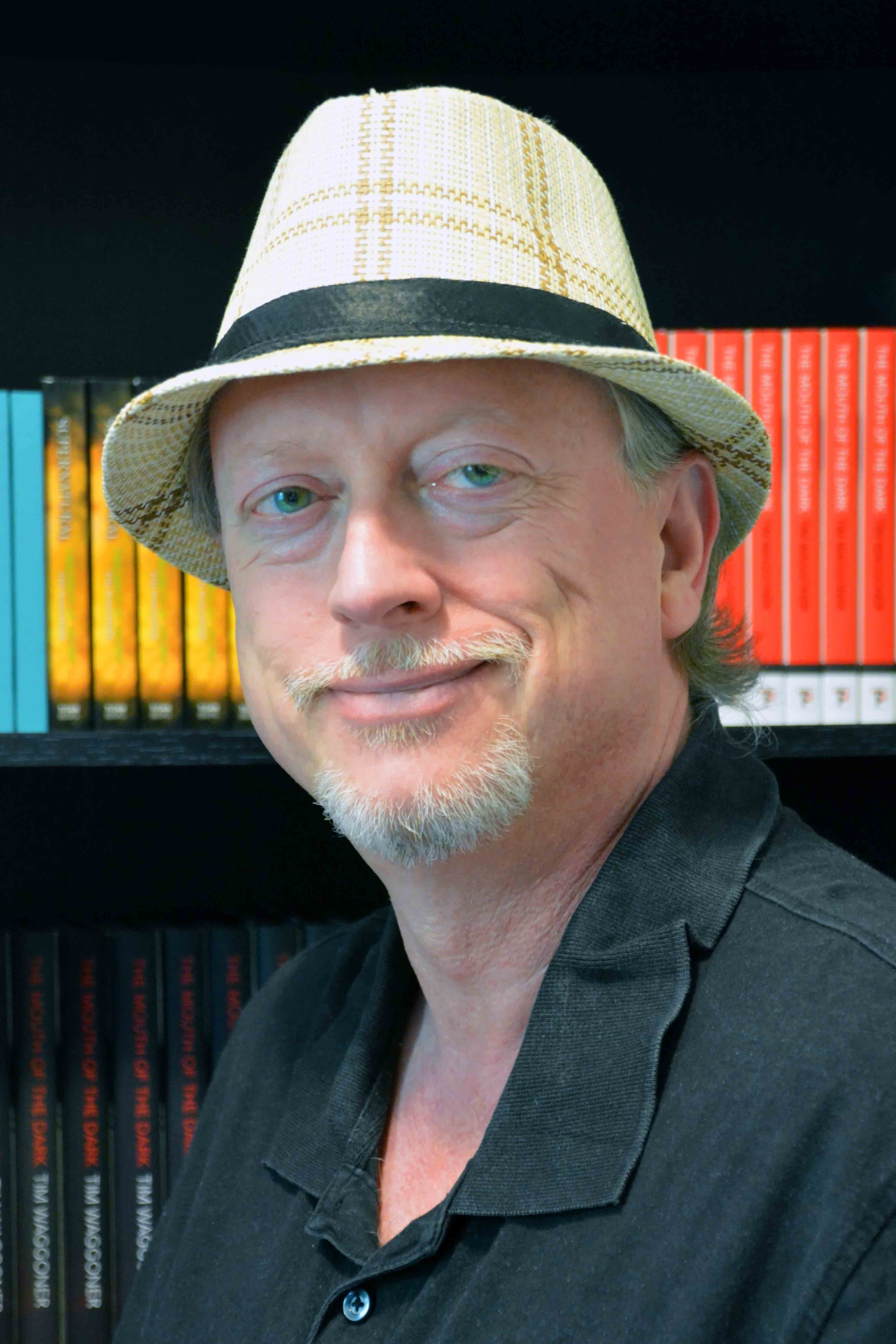
Waggoner in 2019

Tim Waggoner is an American author of novels and short stories in the fantasy, horror, and thriller genres.

== Education ==
Waggoner graduated from Wright State University in 1989 with a Master of Arts in English with a Creative Writing Concentration. He holds BS ed. and MA degrees from Wright State University.

== Career ==
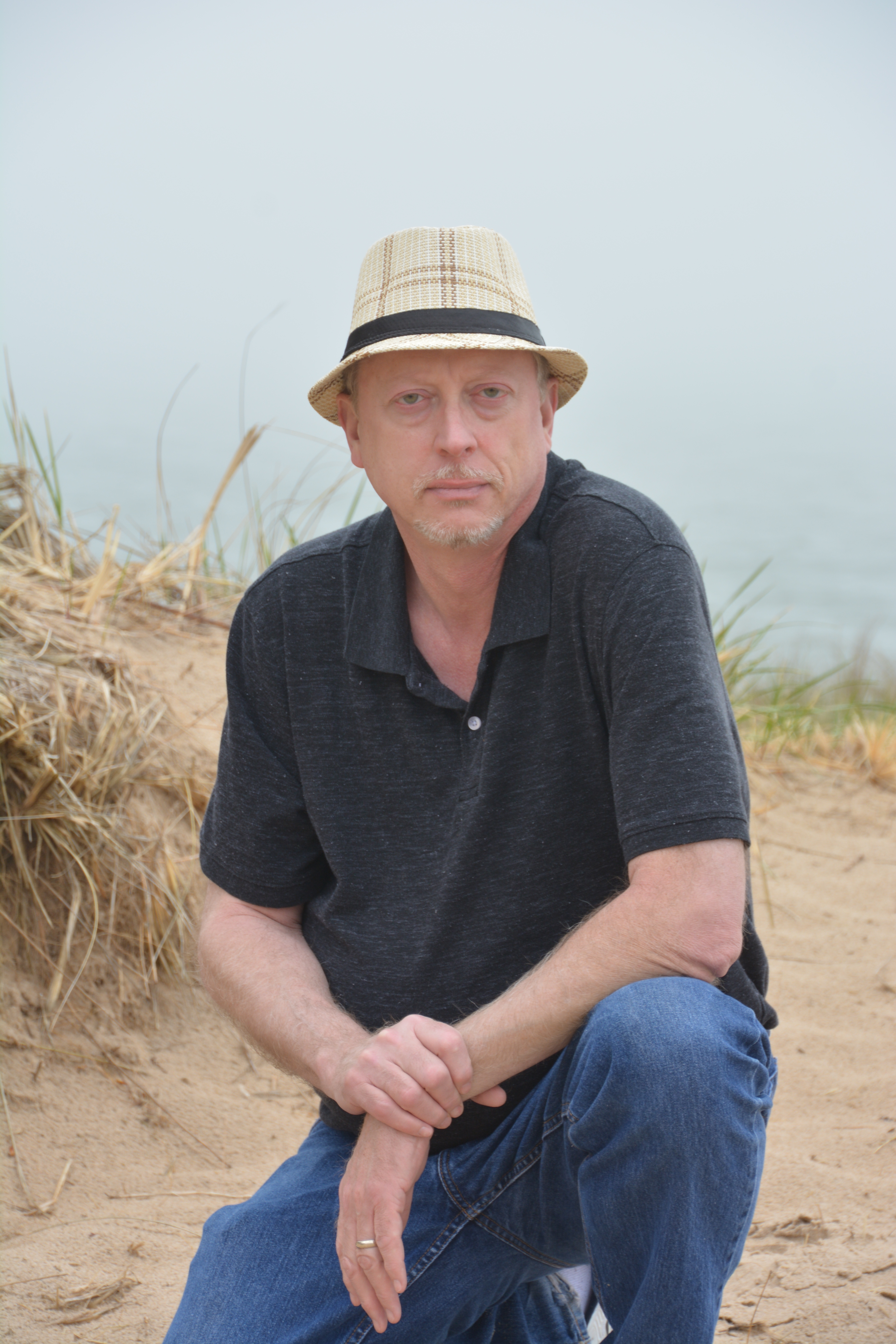
Waggoner in 2018

Waggoner has written and published novels for both adult and young readers, including Temple of the Dragonslayer and Return of the Sorceress (both for Wizards of the Coast), Dark Ages: Gangrel and Exalted: A Shadow Over Heaven's Eye (both White Wolf), Nekropolis (Five Star), and Defender: Hyperswarm (I-Books).

He is also the author of the short story collection All Too Surreal (Prime Books). He has published numerous short stories in the fantasy and horror genres, and his articles on writing have appeared in Writer's Digest, Writers' Journal, New Writer's Magazine, Ohio Writer, Speculations, and Teaching English in the Two-Year College.

He has also written the Nekropolis series of urban fantasies and the Ghost Trackers series written in collaboration with Jason Hawes and Grant Wilson of the Ghost Hunters television show. His books for writers include The Art of Writing Genre Fiction, written in collaboration with Michael Knost, and Writing in the Dark, a guide to writing horror and dark fantasy fiction.

A number of his stories have received honorable mentions in various editions of The Year's Best Fantasy and Horror. He won first place in the 1998 Authorlink! New Author Awards Competition and was a finalist for the Darrell Award for Best MidSouth Short Story in 1999.

His novella The Men Upstairs was nominated for the 2011 Shirley Jackson Award, and his short story "How to be a Horror Writer" was nominated for the 2018 Shirley Jackson Award. His novella The Winter Box won the 2016 Bram Stoker Award for Best Long Fiction.

His how-to-write-horror book Writing in the Dark won the 2020 Bram Stoker Award for Best Non-Fiction, and his article "Speaking of Horror" won the 2020 Bram Stoker Award for Best Short Non-Fiction. His adaptation of Terrifier 2 won the 2025 Scribe Award for Best Adapted Novel.

== Teaching ==
He serves as a professor of English and teaches composition and creative writing at Sinclair Community College in Dayton, Ohio. Waggoner also taught creative writing for many years at Seton Hill University, Pennsylvania, in an innovative low-residency Master of Fine Arts degree program in Writing Popular Fiction.

== Personal life ==
Waggoner grew up in the Dayton, Ohio, area.

In addition to writing fiction, Waggoner has worked as a newspaper reporter, magazine editor, and copy editor. He has two daughters from a previous marriage.

== Bibliography ==
=== Standalone novels ===
- Dying for It (2001)
- The Harmony Society (2003)
- Necropolis (2004) (Rewritten as Nekropolis in 2009)
- Like Death (2005)
- Pandora Drive (2006)
- Darkness Wakes (2006)
- Cross County (2008)
- Last of the Lycans (2010)
- Beneath the Bones (2012) [Re-issue of Cross County]
- The Way of All Flesh (2014)
- Eat the Night (2016)
- Teeth of the Sea (2017)
- The Mouth of the Dark (2018)
- Blood Island (2019)
- They Kill (2019)
- The Forever House (2020)
- Your Turn to Suffer (2021)
- We Will Rise (2022)
- A Hunter Called Night (May 9, 2023)
- Lord of the Feast (April 16, 2024)

=== Series ===
==== Ghost Trackers ====
- Ghost Trackers with Jason Hawes and Grant Wilson (2011)
- Ghost Town with Jason Hawes and Grant Wilson (2012)

==== Godfire ====
- Orchard of Dreams (2006)
- Heart's Wound (2006)

==== Nekropolis ====
- Nekropolis (2009)
- Dead Streets (2010)
- Dark War (2011)
- The Nekropolis Archives (2012) (Omnibus edition of above novels and the short stories "Disarmed and Dangerous," "The Midnight Watch," and "Zombie Interrupted")

==== Shadow Watch ====
- Night Terrors (2014)
- Dream Stalkers (2014)

==== Custodians of the Cosmos ====
- The Atrocity Engine (April 30, 2024)
- The Book of Madness (July 30, 2024)
- The Desolation War (October 2024)

=== Collections ===
- All Too Surreal (2002)
- Broken Shadows (2009)
- Bone Whispers (2013)
- Cemetery Dance Select: Tim Waggoner (2017)
- Dark And Distant Voices (2017)
- Love, Death, and Madness (2018)
- A Little Aqua Book of Marine Tales (2019)
- Old Monsters Never Die: A Story Collection (May 24, 2024)

=== Media tie-ins ===
- Defender: Hyperswarm (2004), after the Defender video game
- Gangrel (2004), from the Dark Ages: Vampire role-playing game
- A Nightmare on Elm Street: Protégé (2005), after the A Nightmare on Elm Street films
- Exalted 5: A Shadow Over Heaven's Eye (2005), after the Exalted role-playing game
- Stargate SG-1: Valhalla (2009), after the Stargate SG-1 television series
- Lady Ruin (2010), from the Eberron Dungeons and Dragons role-playing game campaign setting
- Grimm: The Killing Time (2014), after the Grimm television series
- Alien: Prototype (2019), after the Alien franchise
- Zombicide Invader: Planet Havoc (2022), from the Zombicide board game

==== The Blade of the Flame ====
From the Eberron Dungeons and Dragons role-playing game campaign setting

- Thieves of Blood (2006)
- Forge of the Mind Slayers (2007)
- Sea of Death (2008)

==== Dragonlance: the New Adventures ====
Set in the Dragonlance shared universe.

- Temple of the Dragonslayer (2004)
- Return of the Sorceress (2004)

==== Supernatural ====
After the Supernatural television series.

- Supernatural: Carved in Flesh (2013)
- Supernatural: The Roads Not Taken (2013)
- Supernatural: Mythmaker (2016)
- The Men of Letters Bestiary: Winchester Family Edition (2017)
- Supernatural: Children of Anubis (2019)

=== Film and TV series novelizations ===
- XXX: Return of Xander Cage - The Official Movie Novelization (January 24, 2017), novelization of XXX: Return of Xander Cage
- Resident Evil: The Final Chapter (2017), novelization of the film of the same name
- Kingsman: the Golden Circle (2017), novelization of the film of the same name
- Halloween Kills (2021), novelization of the slasher film
- Terrifier 2: The Official Movie Novelization (2024), novelization of Terrifier 2
- Damien Leone's Terrifier 3: The Novelization (2025), novelization of Terrifier 3
- Crystal Lake (2026), novelization of Crystal Lake television series

==== X series ====
Novelizations of the X film series

- X: The Official Novelization (2024)
- Pearl: The Official Novelization (2024)
- MaXXXine: The Official Novelization (2025)

=== Books on Writing ===
- The Art of Writing Genre Fiction (2018), with Michael Knost
- Writing in the Dark (2020)
- Writing in the Dark: The Workbook (2022)
- Let Me Tell You a Story (Writing in the Dark) (October 5, 2023)
- Just Add Writer (2025)

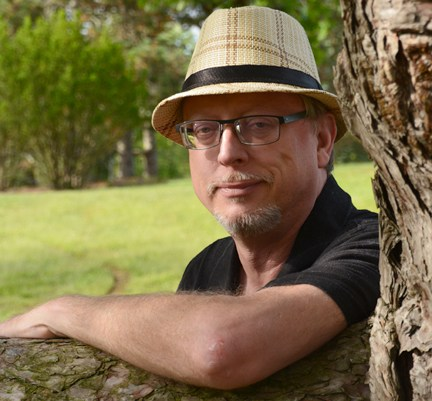
Waggoner in 2019
